= 2015–16 NK Rudar Velenje season =

Rudar Velenje
2015–16 season
- President: Mitja Kamenik
- Head Coach: Ramiz Smajlović
- Stadium: Ob Jezeru City Stadium
- Slovenian League: 7th
- Slovenian Cup: Quarter-finals
- Top goalscorer: League: Mate Eterović (7); All: Mate Eterović (7)
- Highest home attendance: 3,000 (vs Olimpija)
- Lowest home attendance: 350 (vs Krka)
- Average home league attendance: 1,028
Home colours	Away colours	Third colours
- All statistics correct as of 24 May 2016.

The 2015–16 season is Rudar's 21st season in the Slovenian PrvaLiga, Slovenian top division, since the league was created.

== Players ==
As of 1 March 2016

Note: Flags indicate national team as defined under FIFA eligibility rules; some limited exceptions apply. Players may hold more than one non-FIFA nationality.

No.	Pos.	Nation	Player
1	GK	(Slovenia) SVN	Matic Čretnik
4	DF	(Slovenia) SVN	David Kašnik
6	MF	(Slovenia) SVN	Anže Pišek
7	MF	(Slovenia) SVN	Amer Krcič
8	MF	(Slovenia) SVN	Damjan Trifkovič
9	FW	(Slovenia) SVN	Luka Prašnikar
10	MF	(Slovenia) SVN	Leon Črnčič
11	FW	(Slovenia) SVN	Mitja Lotrič
12	MF	(Croatia) CRO	Stjepan Babić
13	GK	(Slovenia) SVN	Matej Radan
14	FW	(Slovenia) SVN	Milan Kocić
17	DF	(Austria) AUT	Erman Bevab
19	MF	(Slovenia) SVN	Klemen Bolha

No.	Pos.	Nation	Player
20	MF	(Slovenia) SVN	Denis Grbić
21	MF	(Slovenia) SVN	Nikola Tolimir
23	MF	(Palestine) PLE	Jaka Ihbeisheh
25	MF	(Croatia) CRO	Marin Bratić
26	DF	(Slovenia) SVN	Elvedin Džinić
28	MF	(Bosnia and Herzegovina) BIH	Safet Gavranović
29	DF	(Croatia) CRO	Ivan Knezović (captain)
31	DF	(Slovenia) SVN	Senad Jahić
32	FW	(Croatia) CRO	Mate Eterović
33	MF	(Croatia) CRO	Mario Babić
37	DF	(Slovenia) SVN	Gašper Kurež
45	FW	(Croatia) CRO	Damir Grgić

Source:NK Rudar Velenje

== Competitions ==
=== Overall ===
Competition	Started round	Current position / round	Final position / round	First match	Last match
PrvaLiga	—	—	7th	19 July 2015	21 May 2016
Cup	First round	—	Quarter-finals	19 August 2015	28 October 2015

Updated to match played 24 May 2016
Source: Competitions

=== Overview ===
Competition	Record							
Competition	Pld	W	D	L	GF	GA	GD	Win %
PrvaLiga	36	11	8	17	34	52	−18	30.56
Cup	4	3	0	1	11	5	+6	75.00
Total	40	14	8	18	45	57	−12	35.00

Last updated: 24 May 2016
Source: Competitions

=== PrvaLiga ===
==== League table ====
Pos	Team	Pld	W	D	L	GF	GA	GD	Pts	Qualification or relegation
5	Celje	36	11	12	13	32	46	−14	45	
6	Krško	36	10	11	15	24	48	−24	41 (Note: Krško ahead of Rudar Velenje on head-to-head record: Rudar–Krško 1–1, Krško–Rudar 0–0, Rudar–Krško 0–1, Krško–Rudar 1–1.)	
7	Rudar Velenje	36	11	8	17	34	52	−18	41	
8	Koper	36	11	7	18	40	54	−14	40 (Note: Koper ahead of Zavrč on head-to-head record: Zavrč–Koper 1–0, Koper–Zavrč 3–1, Zavrč–Koper 1–3, Koper–Zavrč 1–0.)	
9	Zavrč (R)	36	9	13	14	32	41	−9	40	Qualification for the relegation play-offs

Source: Slovenian PrvaLiga (in Slovene), Soccerway
Rules for classification: 1) Points; 2) Head-to-head points; 3) Head-to-head goal difference; 4) Head-to-head goals scored; 5) Goal difference; 6) Goals scored.
(R) Relegated

==== Results summary ====
Overall								Home						Away					
Pld	W	D	L	GF	GA	GD	Pts	W	D	L	GF	GA	GD	W	D	L	GF	GA	GD
36	11	8	17	34	52	−18	41	6	4	8	15	18	−3	5	4	9	19	34	−15

Last updated: 24 May 2016.
Source: Competitive matches

==== Results by round ====
Round	1	2	3	4	5	6	7	8	9	10	11	12	13	14	15	16	17	18	19	20	21	22	23	24	25	26	27	28	29	30	31	32	33	34	35	36
Ground	H	A	H	A	H	A	H	A	H	A	H	A	H	A	H	A	H	A	A	H	A	H	A	H	A	H	A	H	A	H	A	H	A	H	A	A
Result	L	L	L	W	D	D	D	L	W	D	W	L	D	D	W	L	L	L	D	L	W	L	L	W	L	L	W	W	W	W	L	D	L	W	L	L
Position	9	10	10	9	8	8	8	9	6	6	6	6	6	6	6	6	6	7	7	7	7	9	9	8	9	9	8	6	6	6	6	6	8	5	6	7

Updated to match(es) played on 24 May 2016. Source: Competitive matches
A = Away; H = Home; W = Win; D = Draw; L = Loss

==== Matches ====
Win Draw Loss

18 July 2015 1	Rudar	0 – 1	Krka	Velenje
18:30 CEST (UTC+02:00)	Eterović (yellow card) 26'; Jahić (yellow card) 34'; Kašnik (yellow card) 89'; Knezović (yellow card) 90+3'	Report (in Slovene)	Perić 43', (yellow card) 70'; Welbeck (yellow card) 70'; Kastrevec (yellow card) 80'	Stadium: Ob Jezeru City Stadium; Attendance: 1,050; Referee: Dejan Balažič

24 July 2015 2	Gorica	2 – 1	Rudar	Nova Gorica
18:00 CEST (UTC+02:00)	Jogan (yellow card) 22'; Martinović 42'; Džuzdanović 69'; Širok (yellow card) 75'	Report (in Slovene)	Knezović (yellow card) 65'; Prašnikar 71'; S.Babić (yellow card) 75'	Stadium: Nova Gorica Sports Park; Attendance: 350; Referee: Roberto Ponis

1 August 2015 3	Rudar	1 – 3	Zavrč	Velenje
18:30 CEST (UTC+02:00)	Jahić (yellow card) 21'; Prašnikar 44'	Report (in Slovene)	Polić 3', (yellow card) 41'; Glavica 23', 86'; Antić (yellow card) 59'; Rogač (yellow card) 62'	Stadium: Ob Jezeru City Stadium; Attendance: 400; Referee: Andrej Žnidaršič

8 August 2015 4	Domžale	0 – 2	Rudar	Domžale
18:30 CEST (UTC+02:00)	Horić (yellow card) 60' (yellow-red card) 75'	Report (in Slovene)	Bolha (yellow card) 6'; Prašnikar 25'; Jahić (yellow card) 26'; Ihbeisheh (yellow card) 70'; Kašnik (yellow card) 73'; Krcič 83'	Stadium: Domžale Sports Park; Attendance: 450; Referee: Damir Skomina

12 August 2015 5	Rudar	1 – 1	Krško	Velenje
17:30 CEST (UTC+02:00)	Prašnikar 12'; Knezović (yellow card) 39' (yellow-red card) 45'; S.Babić (yellow card) 45' (yellow-red card) 45'; Radan (yellow card) 45'; M.Babić (yellow card) 59'; Ihbeisheh (yellow card) 71'	Report (in Slovene)	Đukić 33'; Jurečič (yellow card) 36'; Petric (yellow card) 90+2'	Stadium: Ob Jezeru City Stadium; Attendance: 1,000; Referee: Alen Borošak

15 August 2015 6	Koper	1 – 1	Rudar	Koper
20:15 CEST (UTC+02:00)	Palčič 47'; Šimurina (yellow card) 55'; Guberac (yellow card) 63'; Štromajer (yellow card) 90'	Report (in Slovene)	Kašnik 20'; Bolha (yellow card) 42'; Tolimir (yellow card) 52'; Kašnik (yellow card) 70'; Žitko (yellow card) 90+7'	Stadium: Bonifika Stadium; Attendance: 400; Referee: Mitja Žganec

22 August 2015 7	Rudar	0 – 0	Maribor	Velenje
17:45 CEST (UTC+02:00)	Trifković (yellow card) 48'; M.Babić (yellow card) 85'; S.Babić (yellow card) 90'	Report (in Slovene)	Arghus (yellow card) 13'; Vršič (yellow card) 90+1'	Stadium: Ob Jezeru City Stadium; Attendance: 2,600; Referee: Matej Jug

30 August 2015 8	Olimpija	5 – 0	Rudar	Ljubljana
17:45 CEST (UTC+02:00)	Kelhar 32'; Šporar 52', 78', 89'; Kronaveter (yellow card) 55'; Djermanović 86'	Report (in Slovene)	Ihbeisheh (yellow card) 23'; S.Babić (yellow card) 26'; Kašnik (yellow card) 36'; Kocić (yellow card) 66'; Jahić (yellow card) 68'; Knezović (yellow card) 73'	Stadium: Stadium Stožice; Attendance: 4,000; Referee: Nejc Kajtazović

12 September 2015 9	Rudar	4 – 0	Celje	Velenje
20:15 CEST (UTC+02:00)	Knezović 43', (yellow card) 68'; Bolha (yellow card) 61'; S.Babić 67' (pen.); Krcič 75'; Kocić 89'	Report (in Slovene)	Firer (yellow card) 29'; Miškić (yellow card) 35'; Soria Alonso (yellow card) 66'	Stadium: Ob Jezeru City Stadium; Attendance: 1,000; Referee: Slavko Vinčić

19 September 2015 10	Krka	0 – 0	Rudar	Novo Mesto
16:00 CEST (UTC+02:00)	Gliha (yellow card) 54'; Kastrevec (yellow card) 59'; Vučkić (yellow card) 74'; Welbeck (yellow card) 85'	Report (in Slovene)	Trifković (yellow card) 66'; M.Babić (yellow card) 85'	Stadium: Portoval; Attendance: 300; Referee: Matej Jug

23 September 2015 11	Rudar	1 – 0	Gorica	Velenje
16:00 CEST (UTC+02:00)	Kašnik (yellow card) 13'; M.Babić 24'; Kocić (yellow card) 58'	Report (in Slovene)	Johnson (yellow card) 41'	Stadium: Ob Jezeru City Stadium; Attendance: 650; Referee: Mitja Žganec

26 September 2015 12	Zavrč	3 – 2	Rudar	Zavrč
19:00 CEST (UTC+02:00)	Batrović (yellow card) 63'; Cvek 68'; Pihler 79', 90'; Petrović (yellow card) 90'	Report (in Slovene)	Knezović (yellow card) 43', (goal) 57'; Prašnikar (yellow card) 78'; Kašnik (yellow card) 78'; Trifkovič 84', (yellow card) 33' (yellow-red card) 89'; Kocić (yellow card) 90+2'; S.Babić (yellow card) 90+2'; M.Babić (yellow card) 90+4'	Stadium: Zavrč Sports Park; Attendance: 650; Referee: Roberto Ponis

3 October 2015 13	Rudar	0 – 0	Domžale	Velenje
17:00 CEST (UTC+02:00)	Žitko (yellow card) 89'; Črnčič (yellow card) 90+2'	Report (in Slovene)		Stadium: Ob Jezeru City Stadium; Attendance: 800; Referee: Damir Skomina

17 October 2015 14	Krško	0 – 0	Rudar	Krško
17:00 CET (UTC+01:00)	Perkovič (yellow card) 55'	Report (in Slovene)	Grgić (yellow card) 38'; Kašnik (yellow card) 51'; Bolha (yellow card) 70'	Stadium: Matija Gubec Stadium; Attendance: 1,000; Referee: Mitja Žganec

24 October 2015 15	Rudar	1 – 0	Koper	Velenje
17:00 CET (UTC+01:00)	Kocić (yellow card) 44'; Žitko (yellow card) 81'; Džinić 87'; Radan (yellow card) 90+3'	Report (in Slovene)	Šme (yellow card) 39'; Tomić (yellow card) 65'; Guberac (yellow card) 78'; Lotrič (yellow card) 81'; Ivančić (yellow card) 85'	Stadium: Ob Jezeru City Stadium; Attendance: 750; Referee: Dejan Balažič

31 October 2015 16	Maribor	7 – 1	Rudar	Maribor
17:45 CET (UTC+01:00)	Ibraimi 3'; Bajde 30'; Tavares 37', 38'; Filipović 45'; Sallalich 50'; Viler (yellow card) 62'; Mendy 89'	Report (in Slovene)	Trifkovič 2'; S.Babić (yellow card) 22'; Grgić (yellow card) 43'; Žitko (yellow card) 63'	Stadium: Ljudski vrt Attendance: 3,000; Referee: Damir Skomina

7 November 2015 17	Rudar	1 – 3	Olimpija	Velenje
17:45 CET (UTC+01:00)	Kašnik (yellow card) 18'; Eterović 20'; Džinić (yellow card) 42'; Črnčič (yellow card) 90+3'	Report (in Slovene)	Šporar 12', 41'; Brljak (yellow card) 26'; Ontivero 46'; Mimoun (yellow card) 80'	Stadium: Ob Jezeru City Stadium; Attendance: 1,500; Referee: Andrej Žnidaršič

22 November 2015 18	Celje	1 – 0	Rudar	Celje
17:30 CET (UTC+01:00)	Vidmajer (yellow card) 26'; Klemenčič 33'; Firer (yellow card) 51'; Kous (yellow card) 60'; Spremo (yellow card) 70'; Pajač (yellow card) 83'	Report (in Slovene)	Tolimir (yellow card) 59'; Kašnik (yellow card); S.Babić (yellow card) 83'	Stadium: Arena Petrol; Attendance: 450; Referee: Matej Jug

28 November 2015 19	Rudar	1 – 1	Krka	Velenje
15:30 CET (UTC+01:00)	Eterović 15' (pen.); Črnčič (yellow card) 30'; Žitko (yellow card) 45'	Report (in Slovene)	Collins (yellow card) 14'; Vučkić (yellow card) 25'; Welbeck 31' (pen.); Marotti (yellow card) 52'; Potokar (yellow card) 56'; Mojstrovič (yellow card) 59'; Mitrović (red card) 88'	Stadium: Ob Jezeru City Stadium; Attendance: 350; Referee: Alen Borošak

2 December 2015 20	Gorica	1 – 0	Rudar	Nova Gorica
13:00 CET (UTC+01:00)	Mevlja (yellow card) 32'; Johnson (yellow card) 67'; Eleke 86'; Celcer (yellow card) 88'	Report (in Slovene)	M.Babić (yellow card) 11'; S.Babić (yellow card) 62'	Stadium: Nova Gorica Sports Park; Attendance: 300; Referee: Nejc Kajtazović

5 December 2015 21	Rudar	1 – 0	Zavrč	Velenje
15:30 CET (UTC+01:00)	Kašnik 23', (yellow card) 25'; Kocić (yellow card) 31'; Eterović (yellow card) 78'	Report (in Slovene)	Tahiraj (yellow card) 35'; Pihler (yellow card) 75'; Rogač (yellow card) 84'; Petrović (yellow card) 88'	Stadium: Ob Jezeru City Stadium; Attendance: 500; Referee: Darjan Kovačič

12 December 2015 22	Domžale	4 – 0	Rudar	Domžale
15:00 CET (UTC+01:00)	Čenic 36'; Skubic 45' (pen.); Mance 57'; Zec 59'	Report (in Slovene)	Črnčič (yellow card) 11'; Radan (yellow card) 45'	Stadium: Domžale Sports Park; Attendance: 400; Referee: Davor Drečnik

27 February 2016 23	Rudar	0 – 1	Krško	Velenje
15:00 CET (UTC+01:00)	Tolimir (yellow card) 56'; Eterović (yellow card) 71'	Report (in Slovene)	Štefanac (yellow card) 26' (yellow-red card) 57'; Volarič 63'; Žinko (yellow card) 89'	Stadium: Ob Jezeru City Stadium; Attendance: 800; Referee: Dejan Balažič

5 March 2016 24	Koper	0 – 1	Rudar	Koper
17:00 CET (UTC+01:00)	Štulac (yellow card) 87'	Report (in Slovene)	Bolha 23'; Kašnik (red card) 68'	Stadium: Bonifika Stadium; Attendance: 1,000; Referee: Miran Bukovec

12 March 2016 25	Rudar	0 – 3	Maribor	Velenje
16:55 CET (UTC+01:00)	Ihbeisheh (yellow card) 15' (yellow-red card) 29'; S.Babić (yellow card) 58'; Črnčič (yellow card) 79'; Džinić (red card) 86'	Report (in Slovene)	Dervišević 33'; Bajde 56', 72'	Stadium: Ob Jezeru City Stadium; Attendance: 1,500; Referee: Mitja Žganec

20 March 2016 26	Olimpija	5 – 0	Rudar	Ljubljana
14:55 CET (UTC+01:00)	Kronaveter 24', 62' (pen.); Wobay 49'; Čale (yellow card) 53'; Mitrović (yellow card) 87'; Knezović 88' (o.g.); Alves 90'	Report (in Slovene)	Bolha (yellow card) 8' (yellow-red card) 61'; Radan (yellow card) 62'; S.Babić (yellow card) 70'	Stadium: Stadium Stožice; Attendance: 2,500; Referee: Roberto Ponis

2 April 2016 27	Rudar	2 – 0	Celje	Velenje
19:00 CEST (UTC+02:00)	Eterović 28' (pen.), 81' (pen.); Tolimir (yellow card) 41'; Džinić (yellow card) 69'	Report (in Slovene)	Krajcer (yellow card) 27'; Miškić (yellow card) 29'; Klemenčič (yellow card) 54'; Vrhovec (red card) 80'; Čirjak (yellow card) 82'	Stadium: Ob Jezeru City Stadium; Attendance: 500; Referee: Nejc Kajtazović

6 April 2016 28	Krka	1 – 5	Rudar	Novo Mesto
16:00 CEST (UTC+02:00)	Welbeck (yellow card) 36'; Fuček 74'	Report (in Slovene)	Črnčič 8'; Eterović 30'; Pišek 33'; Džinić 44'; S.Babić (yellow card) 45'; Kašnik (yellow card) 74'; Grbić 89'	Stadium: Portoval; Attendance: 100; Referee: Matej Jug

9 April 2016 29	Rudar	1 – 0	Gorica	Velenje
19:00 CEST (UTC+02:00)	Jahić 41', (yellow card) 50'; Črnčič (yellow card) 90+2'	Report (in Slovene)	Burgič (yellow card) 44'; Mevlja (yellow card) 89'	Stadium: Ob Jezeru City Stadium; Attendance: 600; Referee: Slavko Vinčić

17 April 2016 30	Zavrč	0 – 2	Rudar	Zavrč
19:00 CEST (UTC+02:00)	Shtanenko (yellow card) 18' (yellow-red card) 90'	Report (in Slovene)	Eterović 52', (yellow card) 52'; Jahić (yellow card) 55'; Krcić 73'; Črnčič (yellow card) 76'	Stadium: Zavrč Sports Park; Attendance: 600; Referee: Alen Borošak

23 April 2016 31	Rudar	1 – 2	Domžale	Velenje
19:00 CEST (UTC+02:00)	S.Babić 75'; Lotrič (yellow card) 80'	Report (in Slovene)	Repas 41'; Husmani (yellow card) 58'; Mance 88'	Stadium: Ob Jezeru City Stadium; Attendance: 900; Referee: Damir Skomina

27 April 2016 32	Krško	1 – 1	Rudar	Krško
18:00 CEST (UTC+02:00)	Vuklišević (yellow card) 15', (goal) 90+6'; Gregov (yellow card) 31'; Pušaver (yellow card) 62'	Report (in Slovene)	Eterović (yellow card) 11', (goal) 32'; Trifkovič (yellow card) 13'; S.Babić (yellow card) 35'	Stadium: Matija Gubec Stadium; Attendance: 1,300; Referee: Dragoslav Perić

7 May 2016 33	Rudar	0 – 2	Koper	Velenje
17:00 CEST (UTC+02:00)	Jahić (yellow card) 60'	Report (in Slovene)	Valencia 10'; Štulac 36'; Radujko (yellow card) 82'; Jefthon (yellow card) 90+3'	Stadium: Ob Jezeru City Stadium; Attendance: 600; Referee: Dejan Balažič

11 May 2016 34	Maribor	2 – 3	Rudar Velenje	Maribor
16:00 CEST (UTC+02:00)	Sallalich 44'; Mendy 78'; Tavares (yellow card) 80'; Defendi (yellow card) 90+2'	Report (in Slovene)	Bolha (yellow card) 11'; Knezović 65'; Črnčič 83'; Tolimir (yellow card) 89', (goal) 90+4'	Stadium: Ljudski vrt Attendance: 4,000; Referee: Roberto Ponis

14 May 2016 35	Rudar	0 – 1	Olimpija	Velenje
16:55 CEST (UTC+02:00)	Eterović (yellow card) 18'; Kašnik (yellow card) 78' (yellow-red card) 90+3'; Črnčič (yellow card) 83'; Knezović (yellow card) 83' (yellow-red card) 90+5'; Čretnik (yellow card) 88'; Lotrič (yellow card) 90+4'	Report (in Slovene)	Fink (yellow card) 24'; Matić (yellow card) 67'; Kronaveter 90+4' (pen.)	Stadium: Ob Jezeru City Stadium; Attendance: 3,000; Referee: Nejc Kajtazović

21 May 2016 36	Celje	1 – 0	Rudar	Celje
16:55 CEST (UTC+02:00)	Pišek 73'; Bašić (yellow card) 89'	Report (in Slovene)	Grgić (yellow card) 84'	Stadium: Arena Petrol; Attendance: 650; Referee: Slavko Vinčić

=== Cup ===
Win Draw Loss

==== First round ====
19 August 2015 First round	Pesnica	0 – 7	Rudar Velenje	Pesnica
16:00 CEST	Ujič (yellow card) 13'	Report (in Slovene)	Jahić (yellow card) 14'; Kašnik 17'; Kocić 50', 54' (pen.), 56', 71'; Krcić 70', 77'	Stadium: Pesnica Sports Park; Attendance: 250; Referee: Dejan Vivod

==== Round of 16 ====
16 September 2015 Round of 16	Rudar Velenje	3 – 2	Krka	Velenje
18:00 CEST	Knezović 37'; Babić 42'; Ihbeisheh 56'; Grgić (yellow card) 71'; Tolimir (yellow card) 83'; Kocić (yellow card) 90+3'	Report (in Slovene)	Novinić 4' (pen.); Dangubić 15'; Ejup (yellow card) 57'; Aniekan (yellow card) 73'; Kastrevec (yellow card) 75'	Stadium: Ob Jezeru City Stadium; Attendance: 600; Referee: Miran Bukovec

==== Quarter-finals ====
21 October 2015 First leg	Rudar Velenje	1 – 0	Maribor	Velenje
18:00 CEST	Tolimir (yellow card) 39'; Jahić 80'; Črnčič (yellow card) 90+2'; Eterović (yellow card) 90+3'	Report (in Slovene)	Kabha (yellow card) 23'; Mertelj (yellow card) 32'; Janža (yellow card) 37'; Sallalich (yellow card) 76'; Gigli (yellow card) 87'	Stadium: Ob Jezeru; Attendance: 1,100; Referee: Roman Glažar

28 October 2015 Second leg	Maribor	3 – 0 (3–1 agg.)	Rudar Velenje	Maribor
18:00 CET	Filipović (yellow card) 40'; Kabha 60'; Vršič (yellow card) 61', (goal) 76'; Tavares 86'	Report (in Slovene)	Grgić (yellow card) 45'; Jahić (yellow card) 59'	Stadium: Ljudski vrt Attendance: 3,500; Referee: Mitja Žganec

== Statistics ==
=== Squad statistics ===
As of matches played 21 May 2016.

No.	Pos.	Player	Total				PrvaLiga				Cup			
No.	Pos.	Player		Goal	Yellow card	Red card		Goal	Yellow card	Red card		Goal	Yellow card	Red card
1	GK	(Slovenia) Matic Čretnik	2	0	1	0	2	0	1	0	0	0	0	0
4	DF	(Slovenia) David Kašnik	32	3	12	2	28	2	12	2	4	1	0	0
6	MF	(Slovenia) Anže Pišek	17	1	0	0	16	1	0	0	1	0	0	0
7	MF	(Slovenia) Amer Krcič	24	5	0	0	21	3	0	0	3	2	0	0
8	MF	(Slovenia) Damjan Trifkovič	36	2	4	1	33	2	4	1	3	0	0	0
9	FW	(Slovenia) Luka Prašnikar	32	4	2	0	29	4	2	0	3	0	0	0
10	MF	(Slovenia) Leon Črnčič	24	2	10	0	22	2	9	0	2	0	1	0
11	FW	(Slovenia) Mitja Lotrič	7	0	1	0	7	0	1	0	0	0	0	0
12	MF	(Croatia) Stjepan Babić	31	2	12	1	28	2	12	1	3	0	0	0
13	GK	(Slovenia) Matej Radan	38	0	4	0	34	0	4	0	4	0	0	0
14	FW	(Slovenia) Milan Kocić	27	5	6	0	25	1	5	0	2	4	1	0
17	DF	(Austria) Erman Bevab	2	0	0	0	2	0	0	0	0	0	0	0
19	GK	(Slovenia) Klemen Bolha	34	1	6	1	31	1	6	1	3	0	0	0
20	MF	(Slovenia) Denis Grbić	15	1	0	0	14	1	0	0	1	0	0	0
21	MF	(Slovenia) Nikola Tolimir	33	1	7	0	30	1	5	0	3	0	2	0
23	MF	(Palestine) Jaka Ihbeisheh	27	1	4	1	26	0	4	1	1	1	0	0
25	MF	(Croatia) Marin Bratić	0	0	0	0	0	0	0	0	0	0	0	0
26	DF	(Slovenia) Elvedin Džinić	25	2	2	1	23	2	2	1	2	0	0	0
28	MF	(Bosnia and Herzegovina) Safet Gavranović	0	0	0	0	0	0	0	0	0	0	0	0
29	DF	(Croatia) Ivan Knezović	24	4	7	2	22	3	7	2	2	1	0	0
31	DF	(Slovenia) Senad Jahić	25	2	9	0	22	1	7	0	3	1	2	0
32	FW	(Croatia) Mate Eterović	25	7	7	0	23	7	6	0	2	0	1	0
33	MF	(Croatia) Mario Babić	38	2	5	0	34	1	5	0	4	1	0	0
37	DF	(Slovenia) Gašper Kurež	1	0	0	0	0	0	0	0	1	0	0	0
45	FW	(Croatia) Damir Grgić	18	0	6	0	15	0	4	0	3	0	2	0
Players who left the club in Summer/Winter transfer window or on loan
–	DF	(Slovenia) Matic Žitko	16	0	5	0	12	0	5	0	4	0	0	0
–	DF	(Slovenia) Rusmin Dedić	1	0	0	0	1	0	0	0	0	0	0	0
–	DF	(Slovenia) Tilen Lešnik	1	0	0	0	1	0	0	0	0	0	0	0
–	MF	(Slovenia) Nejc Plesec	2	0	0	0	1	0	0	0	1	0	0	0
Own goals			–	0	–	–	–	0	–	–	–	0	–	–
TOTALS			–	45	110	9	–	34	101	9	–	11	9	0

=== Goalscorers ===
As of matches played 21 May 2016.

Rank	No.	Pos.	Player	PrvaLiga	Cup	Total
1	32	FW	(Croatia) Mate Eterović	7	0	7
2	7	MF	(Slovenia) Amer Krcič	3	2	5
2	14	FW	(Slovenia) Milan Kocić	1	4	5
4	9	FW	(Slovenia) Luka Prašnikar	4	0	4
4	29	DF	(Croatia) Ivan Knezović	3	1	4
6	4	DF	(Slovenia) David Kašnik	2	1	3
7	8	MF	(Slovenia) Damjan Trifkovič	2	0	2
7	10	MF	(Slovenia) Leon Črnčič	2	0	2
7	12	MF	(Croatia) Stjepan Babić	2	0	2
7	26	DF	(Slovenia) Elvedin Džinić	2	0	2
7	31	MF	(Slovenia) Senad Jahić	1	1	2
7	33	MF	(Croatia) Mario Babić	1	1	2
13	4	MF	(Slovenia) Anže Pišek	1	0	1
13	19	MF	(Slovenia) Klemen Bolha	1	0	1
13	21	MF	(Croatia) Nikola Tolimir	1	0	1
13	20	MF	(Croatia) Denis Grbić	1	0	1
13	23	MF	(Palestine) Jaka Ihbeisheh	0	1	1
Own goals				0	0	0
TOTALS				34	11	45

== See also ==
- 2015–16 Slovenian PrvaLiga
- 2015–16 Slovenian Football Cup
