= 2015–16 NK Maribor season =

NK Maribor
2015–16 season
- President: Drago Cotar
- Head Coach: Ante Šimundža (until 17 August 2015); Saša Gajser (caretaker); Krunoslav Jurčić (29 August 2015 – 29 February 2016); Darko Milanič (from 2 March 2016)
- Stadium: Ljudski vrt
- Slovenian League: Runners-up
- Slovenian Cup: Winners
- Slovenian Supercup: Runners-up
- Champions League: Second qualifying round
- Top goalscorer: League: Jean-Philippe Mendy (17); All: Jean-Philippe Mendy (18)
- Highest home attendance: 12,160 vs Olimpija (5 March 2016)
- Lowest home attendance: 2,000 vs Gorica (25 November 2015) and vs Krško (5 December 2015)
- Average home league attendance: 4,259
Home colours	Away colours

The 2015–16 season was the 56th season in the history of NK Maribor, and their 25th consecutive season in the Slovenian PrvaLiga since the league establishment in 1991. The team participated in the Slovenian PrvaLiga, Slovenian Football Cup, and UEFA Champions League. The season covers the period from 1 June 2015 to 31 May 2016.

== Supercup ==
5 July 2015 Final	Koper	0–0 (3–2 p)	Maribor	Koper
20:00 CET	Galešić (yellow card) 23'; Krivičić (yellow card) 72'	Report	N'Diaye (yellow card) 23'; Kabha (yellow card) 57'; Mertelj (yellow card) 69'; Stojanović (yellow card) 82'	Stadium: Bonifika Stadium; Attendance: 2,500; Referee: Dejan Balažič
	Penalties
	Hadžić (penalty scored); Lotrič (penalty missed); Črnigoj (penalty scored); Krivičić (penalty missed); Galešić (penalty missed); Palčič (penalty scored)		Volaš (penalty scored); Tavares (penalty scored); Vršič (penalty missed); Ibraimi (penalty missed); Mertelj (penalty missed); Rajčević (penalty missed)

Colour key: Green = Maribor win; Yellow = draw; Red = opponents win.

== Slovenian League ==
=== Standings ===
Pos	Team	Pld	W	D	L	GF	GA	GD	Pts	Qualification or relegation
1	Olimpija Ljubljana (C)	36	22	8	6	75	25	+50	74	Qualification for the Champions League second qualifying round
2	Maribor	36	19	11	6	78	37	+41	68	Qualification for the Europa League second qualifying round (Note: Maribor qualified for the Europa League second qualifying round by winning the 2015–16 Slovenian Cup.)
3	Domžale	36	14	13	9	46	31	+15	55	Qualification for the Europa League first qualifying round
4	Gorica	36	15	7	14	48	49	−1	52	Qualification for the Europa League first qualifying round
5	Celje	36	11	12	13	32	46	−14	45	

Source: Slovenian PrvaLiga (in Slovene), Soccerway
Rules for classification: 1) Points; 2) Head-to-head points; 3) Head-to-head goal difference; 4) Head-to-head goals scored; 5) Goal difference; 6) Goals scored.
(C) Champions

==== Results summary ====
Overall								Home						Away					
Pld	W	D	L	GF	GA	GD	Pts	W	D	L	GF	GA	GD	W	D	L	GF	GA	GD
36	19	11	6	78	37	+41	68	8	6	4	43	25	+18	11	5	2	35	12	+23

Last updated: 21 May 2016.

==== Results by round ====
Round	1	2	3	4	5	6	7	8	9	10	11	12	13	14	15	16	17	18	19	20	21	22	23	24	25	26	27	28	29	30	31	32	33	34	35	36
Ground	H	A	H	A	H	H	A	H	A	A	H	A	H	A	A	H	A	H	H	A	H	A	H	H	A	H	A	A	H	A	H	A	A	H	A	H
Result	D	W	W	L	W	L	D	D	W	L	D	W	W	W	D	W	W	W	D	D	W	W	L	D	W	W	W	D	W	W	D	D	W	L	W	L
Position	5	4	1	2	3	3	3	4	4	4	5	5	3	4	4	2	2	2	2	2	2	2	2	2	2	2	2	2	2	2	2	2	2	2	2	2

Updated to match(es) played on 21 May 2016. Source: PrvaLiga website
A = Away; H = Home; W = Win; D = Draw; L = Loss

=== Matches ===
17 July 2015 1	Maribor	1–1	Zavrč	Maribor
20:15 CEST	Filipović (yellow card) 35'; Zahović 39'	Report	Matjašič 10'	Stadium: Ljudski vrt Attendance: 3,000; Referee: Bojan Mertik

25 July 2015 2	Domžale	0–1	Maribor	Domžale
20:15 CEST	Horić (yellow card) 33'; Zec (yellow card) 36'; S. Vuk (yellow card) 90+2'	Report	Tavares 23'; Mertelj (yellow card) 88'; Šuler (yellow card) 90+2'; Stojanović (yellow card) 90+4'	Stadium: Domžale Sports Park; Attendance: 2,200; Referee: Nejc Kajtazović

1 August 2015 3	Maribor	4–1	Krško	Maribor
18:30 CEST	Mendy 6'; Vršič 14'; Gigli (yellow card) 22'; Ibraimi 46', 68'; Filipović (yellow card) 80'	Report	Poljanec 60'; Petric (yellow card) 72'	Stadium: Ljudski vrt Attendance: 4,000; Referee: Mitja Žganec

7 August 2015 4	Koper	2–1	Maribor	Koper
20:15 CEST	Štromajer 49'; Guberac (yellow card) 71'; Galešić 86'; Simčič (yellow card) 90+2'	Report	Bajde (yellow card) 36'; Vršič 47'; Viler (yellow card) 48'; Kabha (yellow card) 74'	Stadium: Bonifika; Attendance: 800; Referee: Dejan Balažič

12 August 2015 5	Maribor	1–0	Celje	Maribor
19:15 CEST	Tavares 68'; Filipović (yellow card) 82'; Tavares (yellow card) 85'	Report	Pišek (yellow card) 67'; Klemenčič (yellow card) 89'	Stadium: Ljudski vrt Attendance: 3,500; Referee: Davor Drečnik

16 August 2015 6	Maribor	0–3	Olimpija	Maribor
20:15 CEST	Šuler (yellow card) 40'; Gigli (yellow card) 74' (red card) 77'	Report	Henty 5' 27'; Kronaveter (yellow card) 29'; Fink (yellow card) 43'; Kapun (yellow card) 46'; Matić (yellow card) 65'; Kelhar (yellow card) 80'; Šporar 90+1'	Stadium: Ljudski vrt Attendance: 10,000; Referee: Damir Skomina

22 August 2015 7	Rudar Velenje	0–0	Maribor	Velenje
17:45 CEST	Trifkovič (yellow card) 48'; M. Babić (yellow card) 85'; S. Babić (yellow card) 90'	Report	Arghus (yellow card) 13'; Vršič (yellow card) 90+1'	Stadium: Ob Jezeru; Attendance: 2,600; Referee: Matej Jug

29 August 2015 8	Maribor	2–2	Krka	Maribor
17:45 CEST	Mendy (yellow card) 20' (goal) 43'; Janža (yellow card) 45'; Mertelj (yellow card) 53'; Ibraimi 61' (f.k.); Handanović (yellow card) 82'	Report	Welbeck 8'; Marotti (yellow card) 35'; Mojstrovič (yellow card) 60'; Dežmar (yellow card) 73'; Bogdan (yellow card) 80'; Vučkić 85'; Bogdan (red card) 90'	Stadium: Ljudski vrt Attendance: 2,500; Referee: Dragoslav Perić

12 September 2015 9	Gorica	1–4	Maribor	Nova Gorica
17:45 CEST	Burgič 6' (yellow card) 51'	Report	Mendy 12'; Tavares 25'; Stojanović (yellow card) 51'; Mendy 57'; Bohar 77'	Stadium: Nova Gorica Sports Park; Attendance: 1,800; Referee: Damir Skomina

19 September 2015 10	Zavrč	2–1	Maribor	Zavrč
19:00 CEST	Šuler 37' (o.g.); Datković (yellow card) 49'; Bajza (yellow card) 70'; Kabha 86' (o.g.)	Report	Mendy (yellow card) 22'; Stojanović (yellow card) 72'; Bohar 76'	Stadium: Zavrč Sports Park; Attendance: 2,200; Referee: Rade Obrenović

23 September 2015 11	Maribor	1–1	Domžale	Maribor
18:00 CEST	Mertelj (yellow card) 30'; Filipović (yellow card) 45'; Tavares 49'	Report	Majer (yellow card) 9'; Vuk 58'; Vetrih (yellow card) 73'	Stadium: Ljudski vrt Attendance: 4,500; Referee: Matej Jug

27 September 2015 12	Krško	1–3	Maribor	Krško
17:45 CEST	Štefanac 6'	Report	Stojanović (yellow card) 5'; Tavares (yellow card) 33'; Šuler 38' (yellow card) 57'; Vršič 71'; Kabha (yellow card) 74'; Bajde 90+4' (yellow card) 90+4'	Stadium: Matija Gubec; Attendance: 1,900; Referee: Andrej Žnidaršič

3 October 2015 13	Maribor	4–0	Koper	Maribor
17:45 CEST	Vršič 39' (yellow card) 58'; Tavares 59'; Ibraimi 61'; Kabha (yellow card) 71'; Tavares 76'	Report	Ivančić (yellow card) 45'; Štulac (yellow card) 55'	Stadium: Ljudski vrt Attendance: 3,500; Referee: Nejc Kajtazović

17 October 2015 14	Celje	1–3	Maribor	Celje
17:45 CEST	Klemenčič (yellow card) 52'; Kous (yellow card) 59'; Đurković 70'	Report	Viler (yellow card) 28'; Ibraimi 50'; Tavares 53' (pen.); Vršič (yellow card) 67'; Sallalich 71'	Stadium: Arena Petrol; Attendance: 2,500; Referee: Nejc Kajtazović

21 November 2015 15	Olimpija	2–2	Maribor	Ljubljana
20:15 CET	Šporar 26'; Alves (yellow card) 53'; Šporar (yellow card) 67'; Klinar (yellow card) 68'; Šporar 90+2'	Report	Bajde 7'; Stojanović 21'; Ibraimi (yellow card) 42'; Gigli (yellow card) 49'; Stojanović (yellow card) 55' (red card) 65'; Mendy (yellow card) 67'; Mejač (yellow card) 70'	Stadium: Stožice; Attendance: 13,500; Referee: Davor Drečnik

31 October 2015 16	Maribor	7–1	Rudar Velenje	Maribor
17:45 CET	Ibraimi 3'; Bajde 30'; Tavares 37' 38'; Filipović 45'; Sallalich 50'; Viler (yellow card) 62'; Mendy 89'	Report	Trifković 2'; S. Babić (yellow card) 22'; Grgić (yellow card) 43'; Žitko (yellow card) 63'	Stadium: Ljudski vrt Attendance: 3,000; Referee: Damir Skomina

8 November 2015 17	Krka	0–2	Maribor	Novo Mesto
14:00 CET	Fuček (yellow card) 82'	Report	Mertelj (yellow card) 20'; Bajde (yellow card) 58'; Tavares 61'; Handanović (yellow card) 64'; Filipović (yellow card) 69'; Tavares (yellow card) 74'; Bajde 83'	Stadium: Portoval; Attendance: 500; Referee: Vojko Goričan

25 November 2015 18	Maribor	4–2	Gorica	Maribor
17:30 CET	ibraimi 21'; Sallalich 42'; Filipović (yellow card) 46'; Jogan 50' (o.g.); Bajde 61'	Report	Kotnik (yellow card) 37'; Eleke 46'; Arčon 90+2'	Stadium: Ljudski vrt Attendance: 2,000; Referee: Dejan Balažič

28 November 2015 19	Maribor	3–3	Zavrč	Maribor
17:30 CET	Ibraimi 17'; Mendy 62'; Kabha 69'	Report	Batrović (yellow card) 10'; Glavica 36' (yellow card) 43'; Riera 54' (pen.); Batrović 55'; Cvek (yellow card) 79'; Pihler (yellow card) 89'	Stadium: Ljudski vrt Attendance: 2,500; Referee: Mitja Žganec

2 December 2015 20	Domžale	0–0	Maribor	Domžale
18:00 CET	Mance (yellow card) 47'; Dobrovoljc (yellow card) 66'; Vetrih (yellow card) 72'	Report	Šuler (yellow card) 19'; Tavares (yellow card) 79'; Filipović (yellow card) 84'	Stadium: Domžale Sports Park; Attendance: 2,100; Referee: Andrej Žnidaršič

5 December 2015 21	Maribor	6–0	Krško	Maribor
17:30 CET	Mendy 7', 21'; Gigli (yellow card) 16'; Bajde 27', 57', 58'; Mendy 69'	Report	Pavič (yellow card) 44'; Sikošek (yellow card) 55'; Volarič (yellow card) 63'; Jakolić (yellow card) 77'	Stadium: Ljudski vrt Attendance: 2,000; Referee: Nejc Kajtazović

13 December 2015 22	Koper	0–5	Maribor	Koper
17:30 CET		Report	Bajde 16'; Ibraimi 31'; Sallalich 34'; Ibraimi 43'; Mendy 90'	Stadium: Bonifika; Attendance: 1,000; Referee: Dejan Balažič

27 February 2016 23	Maribor	0–1	Celje	Maribor
16:55 CET	Defendi (yellow card) 44'; Šuler (yellow card) 52'; Bajde (yellow card) 71'; Filipović (yellow card) 90+3'	Report	Hadžić (yellow card) 32'; Pajač (yellow card) 38' (red card) 57'; Kotnik (yellow card) 90+1'; Spremo 90+2'; Vrhovec (yellow card) 90+3'	Stadium: Ljudski vrt Attendance: 6,000; Referee: Damir Skomina

5 March 2016 24	Maribor	0–0	Olimpija	Maribor
20:15 CET	Viler (yellow card) 28'; Novaković (yellow card) 30'; Janković (yellow card) 78'; Šuler (yellow card) 87'	Report	Matić (yellow card) 17'; Kelhar (yellow card) 30'; Eleke (yellow card) 34'; Mitrović (yellow card) 77'; Fink (yellow card) 84'	Stadium: Ljudski vrt Attendance: 12,160; Referee: Matej Jug

12 March 2016 25	Rudar Velenje	0–3	Maribor	Velenje
16:55 CET	Ihbeisheh (yellow card) 15' (red card) 29'; S. Babić (yellow card) 58'; Črnčič (yellow card) 79'; Džinić (red card) 86'	Report	Dervišević 33'; Bajde 56' 72'	Stadium: Ob Jezeru; Attendance: 1,500; Referee: Mitja Žganec

19 March 2016 26	Maribor	2–1	Krka	Maribor
14:55 CET	Ibraimi (yellow card) 13'; Vršič 43' (red card) 53'; Tavares 77'; Novaković (yellow card) 85'	Report	Kostanjšek 9'; Potokar (yellow card) 36'; Bogdan (yellow card) 90+3'	Stadium: Ljudski vrt Attendance: 3,000; Referee: Roman Glažar

2 April 2016 27	Gorica	0–2	Maribor	Nova Gorica
16:55 CEST	Nunič (yellow card) 86'; Kolenc (yellow card) 88'	Report	Mendy 59' 70'	Stadium: Nova Gorica Sports Park; Attendance: 1,200; Referee: Dejan Balažič

6 April 2016 28	Zavrč	0–0	Maribor	Zavrč
18:00 CEST	Shtanenko (yellow card) 42'; Rogač (yellow card) 59'; Kokorović (yellow card) 89'	Report	Kabha (yellow card) 38'; Viler (yellow card) 67'	Stadium: Zavrč Sports Park; Attendance: 1,500; Referee: Bojan Mertik

9 April 2016 29	Maribor	2–1	Domžale	Maribor
16:55 CEST	Novaković 22'; Defendi 58'; Handanović (yellow card) 90+6'; Defendi (yellow card) 90+6'	Report	Alvir (yellow card) 84'; Mance 89'; Majer (yellow card) 90+1'; Zec (yellow card) 90+6'	Stadium: Ljudski vrt Attendance: 3,500; Referee: Matej Jug

17 April 2016 30	Krško	1–3	Maribor	Krško
16:55 CEST	Žinko 27' (pen.); Đurković (yellow card) 67'	Report	Novaković 22'; Tavares (red card) 27'; Mertelj (yellow card) 63'; Mendy 66', 80'; Janković (yellow card) 83'	Stadium: Matija Gubec; Attendance: 2,400; Referee: Rade Obrenović

24 April 2016 31	Maribor	2–2	Koper	Maribor
16:55 CEST	Janković (yellow card) 26'; Novaković 41' (pen.) 87'	Report	Štromajer (yellow card) 33' (goal) 71'; Andrejašič 76' (yellow card) 76'; Tomić (yellow card) 78'; Radujko (yellow card) 90+1'	Stadium: Ljudski vrt Attendance: 5,000; Referee: Miran Bukovec

30 April 2016 32	Celje	0–0	Maribor	Celje
16:55 CEST	Miškić (yellow card) 48'	Report	Sallalich (yellow card) 45'; Tavares (yellow card) 73'; Filipović (yellow card) 77' (red card) 90+2'; Novaković (yellow card) 90+2'	Stadium: Arena Petrol; Attendance: 4,100; Referee: Matej Jug

7 May 2016 33	Olimpija	1–2	Maribor	Ljubljana
20:15 CEST	Kronaveter 19'; Zarifović (yellow card) 33'; Mitrović (yellow card) 45'; Fink (yellow card) 51'; Kelhar (yellow card) 80'; Alves (yellow card) 88'	Report	Dervišević (yellow card) 9'; Mertelj (yellow card) 51'; Novaković 80' (pen.); Tavares 90+3'	Stadium: Stožice; Attendance: 14,000; Referee: Damir Skomina

11 May 2016 34	Maribor	2–3	Rudar Velenje	Maribor
16:00 CEST	Sallalich 44'; Mendy 78'; Tavares (yellow card) 80'; Defendi (yellow card) 90+2'	Report	Bolha (yellow card) 11'; Knezović 65'; Črnčič 83'; Tolimir (yellow card) 89' (goal) 90+4'	Stadium: Ljudski vrt Attendance: 4,000; Referee: Roberto Ponis

14 May 2016 35	Krka	1–3	Maribor	Novo Mesto
16:55 CEST	Boccaccini (yellow card) 21'; Fuček 33' (yellow card) 57'; Brkljača (yellow card) 68'; Perić (yellow card) 74'	Report	Mendy 29' 39'; Mertelj (yellow card) 64'; Dervišević 90+2'	Stadium: Portoval; Attendance: 700; Referee: Miran Bukovec

21 May 2016 36	Maribor	2–3	Gorica	Maribor
16:55 CEST	Bajde 9' (yellow card) 30' (goal) 38'	Report	Burgič 14'; Kotnik 82'; Osuji 87'; Škarabot (yellow card) 90+2'	Stadium: Ljudski vrt Attendance: 2,500; Referee: Rade Obrenović

Colour key: Green = Maribor win; Yellow = draw; Red = opponents win.

Notes

1. The match was originally scheduled on 24 October 2015, however, it was postponed to a later date due to the European migrant crisis.
2. The match was originally scheduled on 21 November 2015, however, the Football Association of Slovenia decided this day to be used for the postponed fixture between Olimpija Ljubljana and Maribor, which effectively postponed the match between Maribor and Gorica to 25 November 2015.

== Slovenian Cup ==
16 September 2015 Round of 16	Tolmin	0–3	Maribor	Tolmin
16:00 CEST	Kanalec (yellow card) 30'	Report	Volaš 47'; Dervišević 51'; Vujčić (yellow card) 65'; Vokić (yellow card) 68'; Bajde 73'; Filipović (red card) 88'	Stadium: Brajda Sports Park; Attendance: 1,300; Referee: Dragoslav Perić

21 October 2015 Quarter-finals 1st leg	Rudar Velenje	1–0	Maribor	Velenje
18:00 CEST	Tolimir (yellow card) 39'; Jahić 80'; Črnčič (yellow card) 90+2'; Eterović (yellow card) 90+3'	Report	Kabha (yellow card) 23'; Mertelj (yellow card) 32'; Janža (yellow card) 37'; Sallalich (yellow card) 76'; Gigli (yellow card) 87'	Stadium: Ob Jezeru; Attendance: 1,100; Referee: Roman Glažar

28 October 2015 Quarter-finals 2nd leg	Maribor	3–0 (3–1 agg.)	Rudar Velenje	Maribor
18:00 CET	Filipović (yellow card) 40'; Kabha 60'; Vršič (yellow card) 61' (goal) 76'; Tavares 86'	Report	Grgić (yellow card) 45'; Jahić (yellow card) 59'	Stadium: Ljudski vrt Attendance: 3,500; Referee: Mitja Žganec

14 April 2016 Semi-finals 1st leg	Zavrč	2–1	Maribor	Zavrč
18:00 CEST	Golubar 11'; Pihler (yellow card) 23'; Kokorović (yellow card) 32'; Matjašič 43'	Report	Bajde (yellow card) 57' (goal) 71'; Tavares (yellow card) 90+2'	Stadium: Sports Park; Attendance: 1,800; Referee: Dejan Balažič

20 April 2016 Semi-finals 2nd leg	Maribor	5–1 (a.e.t.) (6–3 agg.)	Zavrč	Maribor
18:00 CEST	Mendy 30'; Novaković (yellow card) 34'; Defendi (yellow card) 58'; Sallalich 72'; Viler (yellow card) 76'; Mendy (yellow card) 90'; Sallalich 91'; Novaković 102' 105'	Report	Golubar (yellow card) 23'; Handanović 43' (o.g.); Mužek (yellow card) 45'; Jakšić (yellow card) 49'; Miketić (yellow card) 53' (red card) 75'; Matjašič (yellow card) 75'	Stadium: Ljudski vrt Attendance: 3,000; Referee: Nejc Kajtazović

25 May 2016 Final	Celje	2–2 (a.e.t.) (6–7 p)	Maribor	Koper
20:30 CEST	Podlogar 19'; Vrhovec (yellow card) 87'; Podlogar 111'	Report	Kabha 7'; Vršič 107'	Stadium: Bonifika; Attendance: 2,500; Referee: Matej Jug
	Penalties
	Hadžić (penalty scored); Miškić (penalty scored); Vidmajer (penalty scored); Sousa (penalty missed); Vrhovec (penalty scored); Kous (penalty scored); Travner (penalty scored); Pungaršek (penalty missed)		Filipović (penalty missed); Vršič (penalty scored); Janković (penalty scored); Tavares (penalty scored); Novaković (penalty scored); Kabha (penalty scored); Viler (penalty scored); Mertelj (penalty scored)

Colour key: Green = Maribor win; Yellow = draw; Red = opponents win.

== UEFA Champions League ==
=== Second qualifying round ===
14 July 2015 First leg	Maribor (Slovenia)	1–0	(Kazakhstan) Astana	Maribor, Slovenia
20:30 CET	Šuler 5'; Kabha (yellow card) 29'; Stojanović (yellow card) 82'; Zahović (yellow card) 86'	Report; Report	Ilić (yellow card) 8'; Zhukov (yellow card) 78'	Stadium: Ljudski vrt Attendance: 10,458; Referee: Carlos del Cerro Grande (Spain)

22 July 2015 Second leg	Astana (Kazakhstan)	3–1 (3–2 agg.)	(Slovenia) Maribor	Astana, Kazakhstan
16:00 CET	Dzholchiev 12'; Cañas 43' (yellow card) 55'; Twumasi 58'; Cañas (red card) 67'	Report; Report	Rajčević 39'; Mertelj (yellow card) 57'; Viler (yellow card) 72'; Bohar (yellow card) 75'; Šuler (yellow card) 82'	Stadium: Astana Arena; Attendance: 23,650; Referee: Adrien Jacottet (Switzerland)

Colour key: Green = Maribor win; Yellow = draw; Red = opponents win.

== Friendlies ==
20 June 2015 1	Radgona	0–12	Maribor	Gornja Radgona, Slovenia
17:00 CEST		Report	Mendy 1'; Tavares 22' 31'; Sallallich 36'; Mendy 42'; Volaš 47'; Pörš 49' (o.g.); Vuklišević 54'; Sovec 60' (o.g.); Volaš 66' 71' 73'	Stadium: TŠC Trate; Attendance: 1,000; Referee: Darjan Kovačič

24 June 2015 2	Maribor (Slovenia)	0–3	(Romania) Astra Giurgiu	Beltinci, Slovenia
17:30 CEST		Report	Budescu 27' 52' 60'	Stadium: Beltinci Sports Park; Attendance: 300; Referee: Andrej Tratnjek

27 June 2015 3	Sturm Graz (Austria)	5–2	(Slovenia) Maribor	Gralla, Austria
17:00 CEST	Tadić 25' 40' (pen.); Avdijaj 53'; Horvath 60' 86'	Report	Šuler 45+1'; Mendy 63'	Stadium: Sportanlage Gralla; Attendance: 1,950; Referee: Andreas Kollegger (Austria)

30 June 2015 4	Maribor (Slovenia)	2–0	(Slovakia) Ružomberok	Bakovci, Slovenia
17:00 CEST	Tavares 79'; Mendy 86'	Report		Stadium: ŠRC Bakovci; Attendance: 100; Referee: Sašo Habjanič

1 July 2015 5	Maribor (Slovenia)	4–1	(Serbia) Rad	Rogoza, Slovenia
17:30 CEST	Volaš 21' 34'; Hotić 87'; Volaš 90+3' (pen.)	Report	Ljujić 62' (pen.)	Stadium: Rogoza Sports Park; Attendance: 200; Referee: Alen Borošak

8 July 2015 6	Maribor (Slovenia)	2–2	(Russia) Kuban Krasnodar	Maribor, Slovenia
19:00 CEST	Volaš 47'; Ibraimi 72'	Report	Bukiya 57' (f.k.); Melgarejo 58'	Stadium: Ljudski vrt Attendance: 1,500; Referee: Tadej Mežnar

29 July 2015 7	Maribor (Slovenia)	0–0	(Croatia) Hrvatski Dragovoljac	Rogoza, Slovenia
18:00 CEST		Report		Stadium: Rogoza Sports Park; Attendance: 150; Referee: Tadej Mežnar

10 October 2015 8	Maribor (Slovenia)	2–0	(Croatia) Slaven Belupo	Maribor, Slovenia
15:00 CEST	Celar 62'; Volaš 66'; Janža (yellow card) 88'	Report		Stadium: Ljudski vrt Referee: Armando Šorli

20 January 2016 9	Maribor (Slovenia)	2–2	(Hungary) ZTE	Moravske Toplice, Slovenia
14:30 CET	Rahmanović 2'; Tavares 18'	Report	Daru 36' 79'	Stadium: Hotel Vivat Football Resort; Attendance: 30; Referee: Andrej Tratnjek

23 January 2016 10	Maribor (Slovenia)	3–1	(Croatia) Zagreb	Maribor, Slovenia
16:00 CET	Ibraimi 20'; Bajde 23'; Ibraimi 26'	Report	Boban 84'	Stadium: Ljudski vrt Attendance: 0 Referee: Tadej Mežnar

27 January 2016 11	Maribor (Slovenia)	2–2	(Hungary) Videoton	Maribor, Slovenia
15:00 CET	Mendy 27'; Šme (red card) 42'; Tavares 64'	Report	Feczesin 48'; Kovács 52' (pen.)	Stadium: Ljudski vrt Attendance: 0 Referee: Alen Borošak

2 February 2016 12	Maribor (Slovenia)	4–1	(Austria) Kapfenberger SV	Maribor, Slovenia
16:00 CET	Vršič 21' 29'; Tavares 40' (pen.); Kabha 65'	Report	Son 76'	Stadium: Ljudski vrt Attendance: 0 Referee: Tadej Mežnar

8 February 2016 13	Maribor (Slovenia)	3–1	(Bosnia and Herzegovina) Sarajevo	Belek, Turkey
18:00 CET	Tavares 2' 43'; Mendy 71'	Report	Duljević 27' (pen.)	Stadium: Susesi Sport Center; Referee: Hayri Kivanc (Turkey)

9 February 2016 14	Maribor (Slovenia)	1–0	(Slovakia) Trenčín	Belek, Turkey
18:00 CET	Tavares 90'	Report		Stadium: Gloria Sports Arena; Referee: Sevket Simsek (Turkey)

12 February 2016 15	Maribor (Slovenia)	0–1	(Denmark) Esbjerg	Belek, Turkey
18:00 CET		Report	Jørgensen 7'	Stadium: Susesi Sport Center; Referee: Ibrahim Karakaya (Turkey)

15 February 2016 16	Maribor (Slovenia)	0–2	(Kazakhstan) Astana	Belek, Turkey
16:00 CET		Report	Muzhikov 12'; Despotović 24'	Stadium: Susesi Sport Center; Referee: Vadim Panchenko (Belarus)

18 February 2016 17	Maribor (Slovenia)	0–2	(Ukraine) Dnipro Dnipropetrovsk	Belek, Turkey
16:00 CET		Report	Léo Matos 6'; Ruiz 82'	Stadium: Susesi Sport Center; Referee: Dumitru Muntean (Moldova)

19 February 2016 18	Maribor (Slovenia)	2–1	(Ukraine) Zorya Luhansk	Belek, Turkey
16:00 CET	Mendy 39'; Mujčić 59'	Report	Karavayev 24'	Stadium: Susesi Sport Center; Referee: Robertas Valikonis (Lithuania)

Colour key: Green = Maribor win; Yellow = draw; Red = opponents win.

== Squad statistics ==
=== Key ===
Players

- No. = Shirt number
- Pos. = Playing position
- GK = Goalkeeper
- DF = Defender
- MF = Midfielder
- FW = Forward

Nationality

- = Albania
- = Bosnia and Herzegovina
- = Brazil
- = France
- = Italy
- = Israel
- (North Macedonia) = Macedonia
- = Montenegro
- = Senegal
- = Slovenia

Competitions

- = Appearances
- = Goals
- = Yellow card
- (red card) = Red card

Designations

- ‡ The player was selected in the official 2015–16 Slovenian PrvaLiga team of the season
- # The player was the top scorer in the respective competition

=== Appearances and goals ===
Correct as of 25 May 2016, match v. Celje. Flags indicate national team as has been defined under FIFA eligibility rules. Players may hold more than one non-FIFA nationality. The players squad numbers, playing positions, nationalities and statistics are based solely on match reports in Matches sections above and the official website of NK Maribor and the Slovenian PrvaLiga. Only the players, which made at least one appearance for the first team, are listed.

List of Maribor players, who represented the team during the 2015–16 season, and displaying their statistics during that timeframe
No.	Pos.	Name		Goal		Goal		Goal		Goal		Goal
No.	Pos.	Name	League		Cup		Supercup		Champions League		Total	
1	GK	(Slovenia) Aljaž Cotman	1	0	—	—	—	—	—	—	1	0
2	DF	(Slovenia) Adis Hodžić	1	0	—	—	—	—	—	—	1	0
3	DF	(Slovenia) Erik Janža	11	0	3	0	—	—	—	—	14	0
4	DF	(Slovenia) Marko Šuler	25	1	2	0	1	0	2	1	30	2
5	MF	(Slovenia) Željko Filipović	30	1	5	0	—	—	2	0	37	1
6	MF	(Senegal) Welle N'Diaye	—	—	—	—	1	0	—	—	1	0
7	MF	(Slovenia) Aleš Mejač	4	0	1	0	—	—	—	—	5	0
7	MF	(Bosnia and Herzegovina) Amar Rahmanović	7	0	1	0	—	—	—	—	8	0
8	MF	(Israel) Sintayehu Sallalich	25	5	4	2	—	—	—	—	29	7
9	FW	(Brazil) Marcos Tavares	33	12	4	1	1	0	2	0	40	13
10	MF	(North Macedonia) Agim Ibraimi	27	10	1	0	1	0	2	0	31	10
11	FW	(Slovenia) Milivoje Novaković	11	5	3	2	—	—	—	—	14	7
11	FW	(Slovenia) Luka Zahović	3	1	—	—	1	0	1	0	5	1
13	DF	(Italy) Abel Gigli	12	0	1	0	—	—	—	—	13	0
14	FW	(France) Jean-Philippe Mendy ‡	33	17 #	4	1	—	—	1	0	38	18
17	FW	(Slovenia) Dalibor Volaš	4	0	2	1	1	0	1	0	8	1
18	MF	(Slovenia) Sandi Ogrinec	1	0	—	—	—	—	—	—	1	0
20	FW	(Slovenia) Gregor Bajde	27	13	5	2	—	—	—	—	32	15
21	MF	(Slovenia) Amir Dervišević	9	2	3	1	—	—	—	—	12	3
22	MF	(Slovenia) Dare Vršič	28	5	5	2	1	0	2	0	36	7
23	MF	(Slovenia) Dino Hotić	4	0	1	0	—	—	—	—	5	0
24	MF	(Israel) Marwan Kabha	30	1	4	2	1	0	2	0	37	3
26	DF	(Slovenia) Aleksander Rajčević	2	0	—	—	1	0	2	1	5	1
28	DF	(Slovenia) Mitja Viler	26	0	3	0	1	0	2	0	32	0
30	MF	(Albania) Valon Ahmedi	1	0	1	0	—	—	—	—	2	0
30	DF	(Slovenia) Petar Stojanović	11	1	2	0	1	0	2	0	16	1
31	MF	(Slovenia) Daniel Vujčić	5	0	1	0	—	—	—	—	6	0
33	GK	(Slovenia) Jasmin Handanović	35	0	6	0	1	0	2	0	44	0
35	DF	(Brazil) Rodrigo Defendi	10	1	3	0	—	—	—	—	13	1
39	MF	(Slovenia) Damjan Bohar	28	2	5	0	—	—	2	0	35	2
44	DF	(Brazil) Arghus	1	0	—	—	—	—	—	—	1	0
44	DF	(Slovenia) Denis Šme	10	0	3	0	—	—	—	—	13	0
70	MF	(Slovenia) Aleš Mertelj	30	0	6	0	1	0	2	0	39	0
72	MF	(Slovenia) Dejan Vokić	—	—	1	0	—	—	—	—	1	0
95	MF	(Montenegro) Marko Janković	10	0	4	0	—	—	—	—	14	0
99	FW	(Slovenia) Žan Celar	1	0	—	—	—	—	—	—	1	0
Own goals			—	1	—	0	—	0	—	0	—	1
Totals			—	78	—	14	—	0	—	2	—	94

=== Discipline ===
Correct as of 25 May 2016, match v. Celje. Flags indicate national team as has been defined under FIFA eligibility rules. Players may hold more than one non-FIFA nationality. The players squad numbers, playing positions, nationalities and statistics are based solely on match reports in Matches sections above and the official website of NK Maribor and the Slovenian PrvaLiga. If a player received two yellow cards in a match and was subsequently sent off the numbers count as two yellow cards, one red card.

List of Maribor players, who represented the team during the 2015–16 season, and displaying their statistics during that timeframe
No.	Pos.	Name	Yellow card	Red card	Yellow card	Red card	Yellow card	Red card	Yellow card	Red card	Yellow card	Red card
No.	Pos.	Name	League		Cup		Supercup		Champions League		Total	
3	DF	(Slovenia) Erik Janža	1	0	1	0	—	—	—	—	2	0
4	DF	(Slovenia) Marko Šuler	6	0	0	0	0	0	1	0	7	0
5	MF	(Slovenia) Željko Filipović	10	1	1	1	—	—	0	0	11	2
6	MF	(Senegal) Welle N'Diaye	—	—	—	—	1	0	—	—	1	0
7	DF	(Slovenia) Aleš Mejač	1	0	0	0	—	—	—	—	1	0
8	MF	(Israel) Sintayehu Sallalich	1	0	1	0	—	—	—	—	2	0
9	FW	(Brazil) Marcos Tavares	6	1	1	0	0	0	0	0	7	1
10	MF	(North Macedonia) Agim Ibraimi	2	0	0	0	0	0	0	0	2	0
11	FW	(Slovenia) Milivoje Novaković	3	0	1	0	—	—	—	—	4	0
11	FW	(Slovenia) Luka Zahović	0	0	—	—	0	0	1	0	1	0
13	DF	(Italy) Abel Gigli	5	1	1	0	—	—	—	—	6	1
14	FW	(France) Jean-Philippe Mendy ‡	3	0	1	0	—	—	—	0	4	0
20	FW	(Slovenia) Gregor Bajde	5	0	1	0	—	—	—	—	6	0
21	MF	(Slovenia) Amir Dervišević	1	0	0	0	—	—	—	—	1	0
22	MF	(Slovenia) Dare Vršič	3	1	1	0	0	0	0	0	4	1
24	MF	(Israel) Marwan Kabha	4	0	1	0	1	0	1	0	7	0
28	DF	(Slovenia) Mitja Viler	5	0	1	0	0	0	1	0	7	0
30	DF	(Slovenia) Petar Stojanović	6	1	0	0	1	0	1	0	8	1
31	MF	(Slovenia) Daniel Vujčić	0	0	1	0	—	—	—	—	1	0
33	GK	(Slovenia) Jasmin Handanović	3	0	0	0	0	0	0	0	3	0
35	DF	(Brazil) Rodrigo Defendi	3	0	1	0	—	—	—	—	4	0
39	MF	(Slovenia) Damjan Bohar	0	0	0	0	—	—	1	0	1	0
44	DF	(Brazil) Arghus	1	0	—	—	—	—	—	—	1	0
70	MF	(Slovenia) Aleš Mertelj	7	0	1	0	1	0	1	0	10	0
72	MF	(Slovenia) Dejan Vokić	0	0	1	0	—	—	—	—	1	0
95	MF	(Montenegro) Marko Janković	3	0	0	0	—	—	—	—	3	0
Totals			79	5	15	1	4	0	7	0	105	6

=== Foreign players ===
Below is the list of foreign players who have made appearances for the club during the 2015–16 season. Players primary citizenship is listed first.

EU Nationals

- (France) Jean-Philippe Mendy
- (Italy) Abel Gigli

EU Nationals (Dual citizenship)

- (Albania) (Italy) Valon Ahmedi
- (Brazil) (Italy) Arghus
- (Brazil) (Italy) Rodrigo Defendi
- (Brazil) (Slovenia) Marcos Tavares
- (North Macedonia) (Slovenia) Agim Ibraimi

Non-EU Nationals

- (Bosnia and Herzegovina) Amar Rahmanović
- (Israel) Marwan Kabha
- (Israel) Sintayehu Sallalich
- (Montenegro) Marko Janković
- (Senegal) Welle N'Diaye

== Transfers and loans ==
=== In ===
No.	Pos.	Nat.	Name	Age	EU	Moving from	Type	Transfer window	Ends	Transfer fee	Source
24	MF	(Israel)	Marwan Kabha	24	Non-EU	(Israel) Maccabi Petah Tikva	Transfer	Summer	2018	Free	
—	DF	(Slovenia)	Adis Hodžić	16	EU	(Slovenia) Olimpija Ljubljana	Transfer	Summer		Youth transfer	
13	DF	(Italy)	Abel Gigli	24	EU	(Italy) Parma	Transfer	Summer	2017	Free	
—	DF	(Slovenia)	Medin Bajrami	17	EU	(Slovenia) Domžale	Transfer	Summer	2018	Youth transfer	
—	MF	(Slovenia)	Sandi Ogrinec	17	EU	(Slovenia) Bravo	Transfer	Summer		Youth transfer	
—	MF	(Slovenia)	Juš Štusej	15	EU	(Slovenia) Celje	Transfer	Summer		Youth transfer	
—	FW	(Slovenia)	Aljoša Matko	15	EU	(Slovenia) Krka	Transfer	Summer		Youth transfer	
—	MF	(Slovenia)	Juš Štusej	15	EU	(Slovenia) Celje	Transfer	Summer		Youth transfer	
20	FW	(Slovenia)	Gregor Bajde	21	EU	(Slovenia) Celje	Transfer	Summer	2018	Undisclosed transfer fee, alleged to be between €300,000 and €500,000	
29	DF	(Slovenia)	Matej Palčič	22	EU	(Slovenia) Koper	Transfer	Winter	2019	Free	
7	MF	(Bosnia and Herzegovina)	Amar Rahmanović	21	Non-EU	(Slovenia) Koper	Transfer	Winter	2019	Free	
44	DF	(Slovenia)	Denis Šme	21	EU	(Slovenia) Koper	Transfer	Winter	2019	Free	
30	MF	(Albania)	Valon Ahmedi	21	EU	(Slovenia) Celje	Transfer	Winter	2019	Free	
35	DF	(Brazil)	Rodrigo Defendi	29	EU	(China) Shijiazhuang	Transfer	Winter	2017	Free	
—	MF	(Slovenia)	Rok Horvat	18	EU	(Slovenia) Domžale	Transfer	Winter		Free	
11	FW	(Slovenia)	Milivoje Novaković	36	EU	(Japan) Nagoya Grampus	Transfer	Winter	2017	Free	

=== Out ===
No.	Pos.	Nat.	Name	Age	EU	Moving to	Type	Transfer window	Transfer fee	Source
27	FW	(Slovenia)	Alen Ploj	23	EU	(Slovakia) Zlaté Moravce	Transfer	Summer	Free	
11	FW	(Slovenia)	Luka Zahović	19	EU	(Netherlands) Heerenveen	Transfer	Summer	Undisclosed transfer fee, alleged to be around €700,000	
44	DF	(Brazil)	Arghus	27	EU	(Portugal) Braga	Transfer	Summer	Undisclosed transfer fee, alleged to be around €200,000	
30	DF	(Slovenia)	Petar Stojanović	20	EU	(Croatia) Dinamo Zagreb	Transfer	Winter	Undisclosed transfer fee, alleged to be around €2 million + add-ons	
17	FW	(Slovenia)	Dalibor Volaš	28	EU	(Malaysia) Pahang	Transfer	Winter	Free	
13	DF	(Italy)	Abel Gigli	25	EU	Contract terminated	Transfer	Winter	Free	

=== Loans in ===
No.	Pos.	Nat.	Name	Age	EU	Moving from	Type	Transfer window	Ends	Transfer fee	Source
95	MF	(Montenegro)	Marko Janković	20	Non-EU	(Greece) Olympiacos	Loan	Summer	2016	—	

=== Loans out ===
No.	Pos.	Nat.	Name	Age	EU	Moving to	Type	Transfer window	Transfer fee	Source
—	DF	(Slovenia)	Damjan Marjanović	19	EU	(Slovenia) Krka	Loan	Summer	—	
23	MF	(Slovenia)	Dino Hotić	20	EU	(Slovenia) Krško	Loan	Winter	—	
16	DF	(Slovenia)	Damjan Vuklišević	20	EU	(Slovenia) Krško	Loan	Winter	—	
45	DF	(Slovenia)	Robert Pušaver	20	EU	(Slovenia) Krško	Loan	Winter	—	
97	MF	(Slovenia)	Martin Kramarič	18	EU	(Slovenia) Krško	Loan	Winter	—	
—	FW	(Bosnia and Herzegovina)	Anel Hajrić	19	EU	(Slovenia) Zarica Kranj	Loan	Winter	—	
—	DF	(Montenegro)	Luka Uskoković	19	Non-EU	(Slovenia) Zarica Kranj	Loan	Winter	—	
31	MF	(Slovenia)	Daniel Vujčić	20	EU	(Slovenia) Zarica Kranj	Loan	Winter	—	
36	DF	(Slovenia)	Žiga Živko	20	EU	(Slovenia) Veržej	Loan	Winter	—	
—	FW	(Slovenia)	Bian Paul Šauperl	20	EU	(Slovenia) Veržej	Loan	Winter	—	
7	DF	(Slovenia)	Aleš Mejač	32	EU	(Croatia) Rijeka	Loan	Winter	—	

== See also ==
- List of NK Maribor seasons
