= 2016–17 NK Rudar Velenje season =

NK Rudar Velenje
2016–17 season
- President: Gašper Škarja
- Stadium: Ob Jezeru City Stadium
- Slovenian League: 7th
- Slovenian Cup: Quarter-finals
- Average home league attendance: 761
Home colours	Away colours

The 2016–17 season will be Rudar's 22nd season in the Slovenian PrvaLiga, Slovenian top division, since the league was created. Rudar will be compete in PrvaLiga and Cup.

== Players ==
As of 29 June 2016

Note: Flags indicate national team as defined under FIFA eligibility rules; some limited exceptions apply. Players may hold more than one non-FIFA nationality.

No.	Pos.	Nation	Player
1	GK	(Slovenia) SVN	Matic Čretnik
4	DF	(Slovenia) SVN	David Kašnik
6	MF	(Slovenia) SVN	Anže Pišek
7	MF	(Slovenia) SVN	Amer Krcič
8	MF	(Slovenia) SVN	Damjan Trifkovič (captain)
9	FW	(Slovenia) SVN	Luka Prašnikar
10	MF	(Slovenia) SVN	Leon Črnčič
11	FW	(Slovenia) SVN	Mitja Lotrič
12	MF	(Croatia) CRO	Stjepan Babić
13	GK	(Slovenia) SVN	Matej Radan
14	FW	(Slovenia) SVN	Milan Kocić
17	DF	(Austria) AUT	Erman Bevab
19	MF	(Slovenia) SVN	Klemen Bolha

No.	Pos.	Nation	Player
20	MF	(Slovenia) SVN	Denis Grbić
21	MF	(Slovenia) SVN	Nikola Tolimir
23	MF	(Palestine) PLE	Jaka Ihbeisheh
25	MF	(Croatia) CRO	Marin Bratić
26	DF	(Slovenia) SVN	Elvedin Džinić
31	DF	(Slovenia) SVN	Senad Jahić
32	FW	(Croatia) CRO	Mate Eterović
33	MF	(Croatia) CRO	Mario Babić
37	DF	(Slovenia) SVN	Gašper Kurež
45	FW	(Croatia) CRO	Damir Grgić
—	GK	(Serbia) SRB	Borivoje Ristić
—	DF	(Croatia) CRO	Mateo Mužek
—	MF	(Ukraine) UKR	Ilya Markovskyi
—	FW	(Slovenia) SVN	Nejc Plesec

Source:NK Rudar Velenje

== Pre-season and friendlies ==
=== Summer ===
17 June 2016 1	Rudar Velenje (Slovenia)	0 – 0	(Serbia) Vojvodina	Velenje
18:00 CEST (UTC+02:00)		Report (in Slovene)		Stadium: Ob Jezeru City Stadium

25 June 2016 2	Wolfsberger AC (Austria)	2 – 0	(Slovenia) Rudar Velenje	Bad Kleinkirchheim, Austria
16:00 CEST (UTC+02:00)	Nutz 2'; Tschernegg 19'	Report (in Slovene)

29 June 2016 3	Rudar Velenje (Slovenia)	2 – 1	(Russia) Dynamo Moscow II	Dravograd
18:00 CEST (UTC+02:00)	Lotrič 27'; Grgić 60'	Report (in Slovene)		Stadium: Dravograd Sports Park

30 June 2016 4	Rudar Velenje (Slovenia)	0 – 2	(Romania) CFR Cluj	Slovenj Gradec
18:00 CEST (UTC+02:00)	Petrucci 39' (pen.); Vitor 63'	Report (in Slovene)		Stadium: Slovenj Gradec Sports Park

3 July 2016 5	Spartak Moscow (Russia)	v	(Slovenia) Rudar Velenje	Beljak, Austria
18:00 CEST (UTC+02:00)		[Report (in Slovene)]

6 July 2016 6	Rudar Velenje (Slovenia)	v	(Bosnia and Herzegovina) Željezničar	Velenje
--:-- CEST (UTC+02:00)		[Report (in Slovene)]		Stadium: Ob Jezeru City Stadium

13 July 2016 7	Rudar Velenje (Slovenia)	v	(Serbia) Voždovac	Velenje
--:-- CEST (UTC+02:00)		[Report (in Slovene)]		Stadium: Ob Jezeru City Stadium

27 July 2016 8	Rudar Velenje (Slovenia)	v	(Israel) Hapoel	Velenje
--:-- CEST (UTC+02:00)		[Report (in Slovene)]		Stadium: Ob Jezeru City Stadium

== Competitions ==
=== Overall ===
Competition	Started round	Final position / round	First match	Last match
PrvaLiga	Pre-season		16 July 2016	27 May 2017
Cup	First round		17 August 2016	

Source: Competitions

=== Overview ===
Competition	Record							
Competition	G	W	D	L	GF	GA	GD	Win %
PrvaLiga	0	0	0	0	0	0	+0	—
Cup	0	0	0	0	0	0	+0	—
Total	0	0	0	0	0	0	+0	—

Source: Competitions

=== PrvaLiga ===
==== League table ====
Pos	Team	Pld	W	D	L	GF	GA	GD	Pts	Qualification or relegation
5	Celje	36	15	10	11	48	39	+9	55	
6	Koper (R)	36	12	14	10	43	40	+3	50	Relegation to fourth tier (Note: Koper did not get a competition licence and was thus relegated to the fourth division.)
7	Rudar Velenje	36	10	11	15	49	53	−4	41	
8	Krško	36	8	15	13	39	50	−11	39	
9	Aluminij	36	9	11	16	38	52	−14	38	

Source: PrvaLiga (in Slovene), Soccerway
Rules for classification: 1) Points; 2) Head-to-head points; 3) Head-to-head goal difference; 4) Head-to-head away goals scored; 5) Goal difference; 6) Goals scored; 7) Away goals scored; 8) Fairplay ranking; 9) Draw.
(R) Relegated

==== Results summary ====
Overall								Home						Away					
Pld	W	D	L	GF	GA	GD	Pts	W	D	L	GF	GA	GD	W	D	L	GF	GA	GD
0	0	0	0	0	0	0	0	0	0	0	0	0	0	0	0	0	0	0	0

Source: Competitive matches

==== Results by round ====
Round	1	2	3	4	5	6	7	8	9	10	11	12	13	14	15	16	17	18	19	20	21	22	23	24	25	26	27	28	29	30	31	32	33	34	35	36
Ground	H																																			
Result																																				
Position																																				

Source: Competitive matches
A = Away; H = Home; W = Win; D = Draw; L = Loss

==== Matches ====
Win Draw Loss

16 July 2016 1	Rudar Velenje	v	Krško	Velenje
--:-- CEST (UTC+02:00)		[Report (in Slovene)]		Stadium: Ob Jezeru City Stadium

=== Cup ===
==== First round ====
Win Draw Loss

17 August 2016 First round	Lenart	v	Rudar Velenje	Lenart
--:-- CEST (UTC+02:00)		[Report (in Slovene)]		Stadium: ŠRC Polena

== Statistics ==
=== Squad statistics ===
No.	Pos.	Player	Total			PrvaLiga			Cup		
No.	Pos.	Player	Goal	Yellow card	Red card	Goal	Yellow card	Red card	Goal	Yellow card	Red card

== See also ==
- 2016–17 Slovenian PrvaLiga
- 2016–17 Slovenian Football Cup
