= 2015–16 NK Olimpija Ljubljana season =

NK Olimpija Ljubljana
2015–16 season
- President: Milan Mandarić
- Head Coach: Rodolfo Vanoli
- Stadium: Stožice Stadium
- Slovenian League: 1st
- Slovenian Cup: Quarter-finals
- Top goalscorer: League: Andraž Šporar (17) & Rok Kronaveter (17); All: Andraž Šporar (17) & Rok Kronaveter (17)
- Highest home attendance: 14,000 (vs Maribor)
- Lowest home attendance: 1,000 (vs Krka)
- Average home league attendance: 4,350
Home colours	Away colours

The 2015–16 season is Olimpija's 7th season in the Slovenian PrvaLiga, Slovenian top division, since the league was created.

== Players ==
As of 1 March 2016.

Note: Flags indicate national team as defined under FIFA eligibility rules; some limited exceptions apply. Players may hold more than one non-FIFA nationality.

No.	Pos.	Nation	Player
1	GK	SLO	Aleksander Šeliga
2	DF	SLO	Denis Klinar
3	DF	SLO	Sandi Ćoralić
4	DF	SLO	Dejan Kelhar
6	MF	SLO	Miha Zajc
7	MF	SLO	Rok Kronaveter
8	MF	SLO	Darijan Matić (captain)
9	FW	NGR	Blessing Eleke
10	FW	SRB	Miroslav Radović
11	FW	SLE	Julius Wobay
13	GK	SLO	Rok Vodišek
16	MF	POR	Ricardo Alves
17	DF	SLO	Matic Fink

No.	Pos.	Nation	Player
19	DF	SLO	Aljaž Krefl
20	DF	SLO	Antonio Delamea Mlinar
21	GK	SLO	Darko Brljak
23	MF	SLO	Nik Kapun
24	DF	SLO	Kenan Bajrić
25	DF	CRO	Hrvoje Čale
27	DF	SLO	Aris Zarifović
29	MF	SLO	Rok Baskera
32	DF	SLO	Nemanja Mitrović
41	GK	SLO	Nejc Vidmar
92	FW	FRA	Martin Mimoun
99	FW	BRA	Danilo Mariotto dos Santos

Source:NK Olimpija

== Competitions ==
=== PrvaLiga ===
==== League table ====
Pos	Team	Pld	W	D	L	GF	GA	GD	Pts	Qualification or relegation
1	Olimpija Ljubljana (C)	36	22	8	6	75	25	+50	74	Qualification for the Champions League second qualifying round
2	Maribor	36	19	11	6	78	37	+41	68	Qualification for the Europa League second qualifying round (Note: Maribor qualified for the Europa League second qualifying round by winning the 2015–16 Slovenian Cup.)
3	Domžale	36	14	13	9	46	31	+15	55	Qualification for the Europa League first qualifying round
4	Gorica	36	15	7	14	48	49	−1	52	Qualification for the Europa League first qualifying round
5	Celje	36	11	12	13	32	46	−14	45	

Source: Slovenian PrvaLiga (in Slovene), Soccerway
Rules for classification: 1) Points; 2) Head-to-head points; 3) Head-to-head goal difference; 4) Head-to-head goals scored; 5) Goal difference; 6) Goals scored.
(C) Champions

==== Results summary ====
Overall								Home						Away					
Pld	W	D	L	GF	GA	GD	Pts	W	D	L	GF	GA	GD	W	D	L	GF	GA	GD
36	22	8	6	75	25	+50	74	9	4	5	41	15	+26	13	4	1	34	10	+24

Last updated: 10 April 2016.
Source: Competitive matches

==== Results by round ====
Round	1	2	3	4	5	6	7	8	9	10	11	12	13	14	15	16	17	18	19	20	21	22	23	24	25	26	27	28	29	30	31	32	33	34	35	36
Ground	H	A	H	A	H	A	H	H	A	A	H	A	H	A	A	A	H	H	H	A	H	A	H	A	H	H	A	A	H	A	H	A	H	A	A	H
Result	W	D	L	W	W	W	W	W	W	W	L	D	W	W	W	W	D	W	L	W	D	L	W	D	D	W	W	D	D	W	L	W	L	W	W	W
Position	1	2	6	3	2	2	1	1	1	1	1	1	1	1	1	1	1	1	1	1	1	1	1	1	1	1	1	1	1	1	1	1	1	1	1	1

Updated to match(es) played on 10 April 2016. Source: Competitive matches
A = Away; H = Home; W = Win; D = Draw; L = Loss

==== Matches ====
Win Draw Loss

18 July 2015 1	Olimpija	4 – 1	Gorica	Ljubljana
20:15 CEST (UTC+02:00)	Kapun 18'; Kronaveter 25', 68'; Krefl (yellow card) 38'; Henty (yellow card) 52'; Šporar 89'	Report (in Slovene)	Arčon 45'; Martinovič (yellow card) 46'	Stadium: Stožice Stadium; Attendance: 2,000; Referee: Davor Drečnik

24 July 2015 2	Zavrč	0 – 0	Olimpija	Zavrč
20:15 CEST (UTC+02:00)	Polić (yellow card) 23'; Matjašič (yellow card) 35'; Cvek (yellow card) 47'; Novoselec (yellow card) 73'	Report (in Slovene)	Kapun (yellow card) 50'	Stadium: Zavrč Sports Park; Attendance: 900; Referee: Miran Bukovec

1 August 2015 3	Olimpija	0 – 2	Domžale	Ljubljana
20:15 CEST (UTC+02:00)	Kronaveter (yellow card) 16' (yellow-red card) 60'; Fink (yellow card) 27' (yellow-red card) 30'; Šporar (yellow card) 30'	Report (in Slovene)	Trajkovski 16'; Šišić (yellow card) 35'; Husmani (yellow card) 71'; Mance 85'	Stadium: Stožice Stadium; Attendance: 2,000; Referee: Matej Jug

8 August 2015 4	Krško	0 – 2	Olimpija	Krško
20:15 CEST (UTC+02:00)	Volarič (yellow card) 19'; Petric (yellow card) 40'; Drnovšek (yellow card) 74'	Report (in Slovene)	Barjrić (yellow card) 17'; Alves Coelho Silva (yellow card) 33', (goal) 38'; Matič (yellow card) 34'; Šporar 63'; Henty (yellow card) 70'	Stadium: Matija Gubec Stadium; Attendance: 2,400; Referee: Roman Glažar

12 August 2015 5	Olimpija	4 – 1	Koper	Ljubljana
17:30 CEST (UTC+02:00)	Djermanović (yellow card) 14', (goal) 25'; Kronaveter 40'; Henty 50', 73'	Report (in Slovene)	Rahmanović (yellow card) 11', (goal) 32'; Guberac (yellow card) 35'; Ivančić (yellow card) 45'	Stadium: Stožice Stadium; Attendance: 1,500; Referee: Bojan Mertik

16 August 2015 6	Maribor	0 – 3	Olimpija	Maribor
20:15 CEST (UTC+02:00)	Šuler (yellow card) 40'; Gigli (yellow card) 74', (red card) 77'	Report (in Slovene)	Henty 5', 27'; Kronaveter (yellow card) 29'; Fink (yellow card) 43'; Kapun (yellow card) 46'; Matić (yellow card) 65'; Kelhar (yellow card) 80'; Šporar 90+1'	Stadium: Ljudski vrt Attendance: 10,000; Referee: Damir Skomina

23 August 2015 7	Olimpija	6 – 0	Celje	Ljubljana
17:45 CEST (UTC+02:00)	Kronaveter 9' 37'; Kelhar 70'; Ricardo Alves 76'; Šporar 78'; Djermanović 89'	Report (in Slovene)	Miškić (yellow card) 52'; Vidmajer (yellow card) 83'; Travner (yellow card) 89'	Stadium: Stožice Stadium; Attendance: 3,500; Referee: Roberto Ponis

30 August 2015 8	Olimpija	5 – 0	Rudar	Ljubljana
17:45 CEST (UTC+02:00)	Kelhar 32'; Šporar 52', 78', 89'; Kronaveter (yellow card) 55'; Djermanović 86'	Report (in Slovene)	Ihbeisheh (yellow card) 23'; S.Babić (yellow card) 26'; Kašnik (yellow card) 36'; Kocić (yellow card) 66'; Jahić (yellow card) 68'; Knezović (yellow card) 73'	Stadium: Stadium Stožice; Attendance: 4,000; Referee: Nejc Kajtazović

11 September 2015 9	Krka	1 – 3	Olimpija	Novo Mesto
17:00 CEST (UTC+02:00)	Fuček (yellow card) 59'; Kastrevec 83'	Report (in Slovene)	Henty 53', (yellow card) 74'; Matić (yellow card) 57'; Bajrić (yellow card) 75'; Zajc 79', 86'	Stadium: Portoval; Attendance: 750; Referee: Bojan Mertik

19 September 2015 10	Gorica	0 – 3	Olimipja	Nova Gorica
17:45 CEST (UTC+02:00)	Jogan (yellow card) 44'	Report (in Slovene)	Kronaveter 45' (pen.), 89'; Bajrić (yellow card) 58'; Kapun 79'	Stadium: Nova Gorica Sports Park; Attendance: 1,800; Referee: Nejc Kajtazović

23 September 2015 11	Olimpija	0 – 2	Zavrč	Ljubljana
18:00 CEST (UTC+02:00)	Mitrović (yellow card) 67'	Report (in Slovene)	Batrović 12'; Matjašič 17', (yellow card) 45'; Zorko (yellow card) 57'; Bajza (yellow card) 70'	Stadium: Stožice Stadium; Attendance: 3,000; Referee: Damir Skomina

26 September 2015 12	Domžale	1 – 1	Olimpija	Domžale
17:45 CEST (UTC+02:00)	Zec 66'; Dobrovoljc (yellow card) 69'; Majer (yellow card) 74'	Report (in Slovene)	Šporar 38', (yellow card) 69'; Mitrović (yellow card) 69' (red card); Kapun (yellow card) 78'; Fink (yellow card) 80'; Bajrić (yellow card) 83'; Alves Coelho Silva (yellow card) 88'	Stadium: Domžale Sports Park; Attendance: 2,600; Referee: Mitja Žganec

4 October 2015 13	Olimpija	5 – 0	Krško	Ljubljana
17:45 CEST (UTC+02:00)	Kelhar (yellow card) 5'; Ontivero 14', 54'; Kapun 39', 68'; Klinar (yellow card) 75'; Šporar 87' (pen.)	Report (in Slovene)	Štefanac (yellow card) 46'; Volarič (yellow card) 72'; Perkovič (yellow card) 87'	Stadium: Stožice Stadium; Attendance: 2,000; Referee: Slavko Vinčić

18 October 2015 14	Koper	1 – 2	Olimpija	Koper
17:45 CEST (UTC+02:00)	Rahmanović (yellow card) 8'; Galešić (yellow card) 34'; Ivančić 46'; Šme (yellow card) 61'	Report (in Slovene)	Henty 19', 62'; Fink (yellow card) 26' (yellow-red card) 90+4'; Baskera (yellow card) 90+5'	Stadium: Bonifika Stadium; Attendance: 1,600; Referee: Miran Bukovec

21 November 2015 15	Olimpija	2 – 2	Maribor	Ljubljana
20:15 CET (UTC+01:00)	Šporar 26', 90+2', (yellow card) 67'; Alves (yellow card) 53'; Klinar (yellow card) 68'	Report (in Slovene)	Bajde 7'; Stojanović 21', (yellow card) 55' (yellow-red card) 65'; Ibraimi (yellow card) 42'; Gigli (yellow card) 49'; Mendy (yellow card) 67'; Mejač (yellow card) 70'	Stadium: Stožice; Attendance: 13,500; Referee: Davor Drečnik

31 October 2015 16	Celje	0 – 4	Olimpija	Celje
15:30 CET (UTC+01:00)	Ramón Soria (yellow card) 29'; Klapan (yellow card) 55'; Osman Ali (yellow card) 66'	Report (in Slovene)	Šporar 15', 22', 45+1', 86'; Henty (yellow card) 54'; Matić (yellow card) 87'	Stadium: Arena Petrol; Attendance: 1,250; Referee: Nejc Kajtazović

7 November 2015 17	Rudar	1 – 3	Olimpija	Velenje
17:45 CET (UTC+01:00)	Kašnik (yellow card) 18'; Eterović 20'; Džinić (yellow card) 42'; Črnčič (yellow card) 90+3'	Report (in Slovene)	Šporar 12', 41'; Brljak (yellow card) 26'; Ontivero 46'; Mimoun (yellow card) 80'	Stadium: Ob Jezeru City Stadium; Attendance: 1,500; Referee: Andrej Žnidaršič

25 November 2015 18	Olimpija	3 – 1	Krka	Ljubljana
17:30 CET (UTC+01:00)	Bogdan 20' (o.g.); Kronaveter 52', 78'; Kapun (yellow card) 80'	Report (in Slovene)	Welbeck (yellow card) 30'; Perić (yellow card) 68'; Kelhar 77' (o.g.)	Stadium: Stožice Stadium; Attendance: 1,000; Referee: Roberto Ponis

29 November 2015 19	Olimpija	0 – 2	Gorica	Ljubljana
17:30 CET (UTC+01:00)	Kronaveter (yellow card) 35'	Report (in Slovene)	Džuzdanović 27'; Cvijanović (yellow card) 59' (goal) 90'; Širok (yellow card) 83'	Stadium: Stožice Stadium; Attendance: 1,200; Referee: Damir Skomina

2 December 2015 20	Zavrč	1 – 2	Olimpija	Zavrč
CET (UTC+01:00)	Golubar 5', (yellow card) 68'; Tahiraj (yellow card) 9'; Glavina (yellow card) 18'; Kokorović (yellow card) 49'	Report (in Slovene)	Ontivero 22'; Čale (yellow card) 24'; Zajc (yellow card) 33'; Henty 64'	Stadium: Zavrč Sports Park; Attendance: 750; Referee: Slavko Vinčić

6 December 2015 21	Olimpija	0 – 0	Domžale	Ljubljana
17:30 CET (UTC+01:00)	Henty (yellow card) 45'; Fink (yellow card) 62'; Klinar (yellow card) 72'; Kelhar (yellow card) 82'	Report (in Slovene)	Črnic (yellow card) 28'; Balkovec (yellow card) 40'	Stadium: Stožice Stadium; Attendance: 1,500; Referee: Dejan Balažič

12 December 2015 22	Krško	2 – 1	Olimpija	Krško
17:30 CET (UTC+01:00)	Poljanec (red card) 32'; Perković (yellow card) 45'; Čeh (yellow card) 51'; Volarič 70'; Žinko 74' (pen.)	Report (in Slovene)	Kronaveter 8'; Ontivero (yellow card) 20'; Kelhar (yellow card) 68'; Klinar (yellow card) 73'	Stadium: Matija Gubec Stadium; Attendance: 700; Referee: Matej Jug

28 February 2016 23	Olimpija	2 – 0	Koper	Ljubljana
16:55 CET (UTC+01:00)	Zajc 34' (yellow card) 76'; Radović 70'; Čale (yellow card) 74'	Report (in Slovene)	Štromajer (yellow card) 60'; Memolla (yellow card) 77'	Stadium: Stožice Stadium; Attendance: 2,500; Referee: Nejc Kajtazović

5 March 2016 24	Maribor	0 – 0	Olimpija	Maribor
20:15 CET (UTC+01:00)	Viler (yellow card) 28'; Novaković (yellow card) 30'; Janković (yellow card) 78'; Šuler (yellow card) 87'	Report (in Slovene)	Matić (yellow card) 17'; Kelhar (yellow card) 30'; Eleke (yellow card) 34'; Mitrović (yellow card) 77'; Fink (yellow card) 84'	Stadium: Ljudski vrt Attendance: 12,160; Referee: Matej Jug

13 March 2016 25	Olimpija	0 – 0	Celje	Ljubljana
16:55 CET (UTC+01:00)	Mitrović (yellow card) 17'	Report (in Slovene)	Pajač (yellow card) 20'; Vrhovec (yellow card) 29'; Čirjak (yellow card) 81'	Stadium: Stožice Stadium; Attendance: 2,000; Referee: Dragoslav Perič

20 March 2016 26	Olimpija	5 – 0	Rudar	Ljubljana
14:55 CET (UTC+01:00)	Kronaveter 24', 62' (pen.); Wobay 49'; Čale (yellow card) 53'; Mitrović (yellow card) 87'; Knezović 88' (o.g.); Alves 90'	Report (in Slovene)	Bolha (yellow card) 8' (yellow-red card) 61'; Radan (yellow card) 62'; S.Babić (yellow card) 70'	Stadium: Stadium Stožice; Attendance: 2,500; Referee: Roberto Ponis

2 April 2016 27	Krka	0 – 2	Olimpija	Novo Mesto
15:00 CEST (UTC+02:00)	Marotti (yellow card) 41'	Report (in Slovene)	Matić (yellow card) 18'; Radović 21'; Eleke 59'	Stadium: Portoval; Attendance: 500; Referee: Andrej Žnidaršič

6 April 2016 28	Gorica	1 – 1	Olimipja	Nova Gorica
16:00 CEST (UTC+02:00)	Kavčič (yellow card) 50'; Kotnik 80'; Kapić (yellow card) 82'; Gregorič (yellow card) 84'; Martinovič (yellow card) 89'	Report (in Slovene)	Kronaveter 40' (pen.); Fink (yellow card) 54'; Zajc (yellow card) 76'	Stadium: Nova Gorica Sports Park; Attendance: 1,300; Referee: Damir Skomina

10 April 2016 29	Olimpija	1 – 1	Zavrč	Ljubljana
16:55 CEST (UTC+02:00)	Matić (yellow card) 36'; Fink (yellow card) 42'; Kapun (yellow card) 65'; Eleke 90+3'	Report (in Slovene)	Agboyi (yellow card) 9'; Šeliga 68' (o.g.); Filipović (yellow card) 85'	Stadium: Stožice Stadium; Attendance: 3,000; Referee: Miran Bukovec

16 April 2016 30	Domžale	0 – 1	Olimpija	Domžale
16:55 CEST (UTC+02:00)	Vetrih (yellow card) 19'; Zec (yellow card) 28'; Horić (yellow card) 89'	Report (in Slovene)	Mitrović (yellow card) 66'; Kronaveter 69'	Stadium: Domžale Sports Park; Attendance: 2,500; Referee: Dejan Balažič

23 April 2016 31	Olimpija	0 – 1	Krško	Ljubljana
16:55 CEST (UTC+02:00)	Zajc (yellow card) 3'; Čale (yellow card) 45'; Bajrić (yellow card) 89'; Vidmar (yellow card) 90+3'	Report (in Slovene)	Volarič (yellow card) 31'; Vuklišević (yellow card) 33'; Čeh (yellow card) 36'; Kramarič 61'; Jakolić (yellow card) 90+2'	Stadium: Stožice Stadium; Attendance: 2,500; Referee: Matej Jug

1 May 2016 32	Koper	1 – 2	Olimpija	Koper
17:00 CEST (UTC+02:00)	Andrejašič (yellow card) 15'; Štromajer 36'	Report (in Slovene)	Wobay 54'; Klinar 67', (yellow card) 88'; Vidmar (yellow card) 89'	Stadium: Bonifika Stadium; Attendance: 2,700; Referee: Andrej Žnidaršič

7 May 2016 33	Olimpija	1 – 2	Maribor	Ljubljana
20:15 CEST (UTC+02:00)	Kronaveter 19'; Zarifović (yellow card) 33'; Mitrović (yellow card) 45'; Fink (yellow card) 51'; Kelhar (yellow card) 80'; Alves (yellow card) 88'	Report (in Slovene)	Dervišević (yellow card) 9'; Mertelj (yellow card) 51'; Novaković 80' (pen.); Tavares 90+3'	Stadium: Stožice; Attendance: 14,000; Referee: Damir Skomina

11 May 2016 34	Celje	1 – 3	Olimpija	Celje
16:00 CEST (UTC+02:00)	Čirjak 21'; Pajač (yellow card) 89'	Report (in Slovene)	Bajrić 3'; Zajc 20'; Kronaveter 47'; Klinar (yellow card) 66'	Stadium: Arena Petrol; Attendance: 3,200; Referee: Dragoslav Perić

14 May 2016 35	Rudar	0 – 1	Olimpija	Velenje
16:55 CEST (UTC+02:00)	Eterović (yellow card) 18'; Kašnik (yellow card) 78' (yellow-red card) 90+3'; Črnčič (yellow card) 83'; Knezović (yellow card) 83' (yellow-red card) 90+5'; Čretnik (yellow card) 88'; Lotrič (yellow card) 90+4'	Report (in Slovene)	Fink (yellow card) 24'; Matić (yellow card) 67'; Kronaveter 90+4' (pen.)	Stadium: Ob Jezeru City Stadium; Attendance: 3,000; Referee: Nejc Kajtazović

21 May 2016 36	Olimpija	3 – 0	Krka	Ljubljana
16:55 CEST (UTC+02:00)	Zajc 23'; Klinar (yellow card) 37'; Eleke 44'; Delamea Mlinar 87'	Report (in Slovene)	Ejup (yellow card) 28'; Dežmar (yellow card) 39'	Stadium: Stožice Stadium; Attendance: 13,000; Referee: Andrej Žnidaršič

=== Cup ===
==== First round ====
19 August 2015 1	Rogaška	W.O.	Olimpija	Rogaška Slatina
16:00 CEST (UTC+02:00)		Report (in Slovene)		Stadium: City Stadium

==== Round of 16 ====
15 September 2015 2	Ivančna Gorica	1 – 3	Olimpija	Ivančna Gorica
16:00 CEST (UTC+02:00)	Kovačević (yellow card) 47'; Asić (yellow card) 59'; Šajn 64'; Voje (yellow card) 74'	Report (in Slovene)	Mariotto dos Santos 7'; Henty 66'; Djermanović 81'; Mimoun (yellow card) 83'	Stadium: Ivančna Gorica Stadium; Attendance: 750; Referee: Marko Podgoršek

==== Quarter-finals ====
21 October 2015 First leg	Olimpija	2 – 2	Celje	Ljubljana
17:30 CEST (UTC+02:00)	Mitrović 32', 68'; Henty (yellow card) 64'	Report (in Slovene)	Firer 26'; Pajač 36', (yellow card) 56'; Vidmajer (yellow card) 41'; Soria (yellow card) 56'; Osman Ali (yellow card) 89'	Stadium: Stožice; Attendance: 700; Referee: Andrej Žnidaršič

28 October 2015 Second leg	Celje	3 – 1 (5 – 3 agg.)	Olimpija	Celje
17:30 CET (UTC+01:00)	Kous (yellow card) 19' (yellow-red card) 37'; Firer 23', (yellow card) 37'; Spremo 33', (yellow card) 59'; Mitrović 79' (o.g.)	Report (in Slovene)	Henty 88'; Mitrović (yellow card) 83'	Stadium: Arena Petrol; Attendance: 1,100; Referee: Roberto Ponis

== See also ==
- 2015–16 Slovenian PrvaLiga
- 2015–16 Slovenian Football Cup
