= Son Won-gil =

South Korean footballer (born 1999)

Personal information
- Date of birth: 1 January 1999 (age 27)
- Position: Midfielder

Youth career
- FC Seoul
- 2014–2015: Kapfenberger SV
- 2016–2017: Buckswood Football Academy

Senior career*
| Years | Team | Apps | (Gls) |
| 2015–2016 | Kapfenberger SV II | 6 | (0) |
| 2015–2016 | Kapfenberger SV | 3 | (0) |
| 2018–2019 | Seoul Nowon United | | |
| 2019 | Pocheon Citizen | | |
| 2020 | Seoul Nowon United | 4 | (1) |
| 2020 | Stadl-Paura | | |

International career
| 2013 | South Korea U14 | 2 | (0) |
- * Club domestic league appearances and goals

- Son Won-gil
- Hangul: 손원길
- RR: Son Wongil
- MR: Son Wŏn'gil

Son Won-gil (Korean: 손원길; born 1 January 1999) is a South Korean former footballer.
