= Daniel Vujčić =

Slovenian footballer (born 1995)

Personal information
- Full name: Daniel Vujčić
- Date of birth: 12 April 1995 (age 31)
- Place of birth: Slovenia
- Height: 1.77 m (5 ft 10 in)
- Position: Midfielder

Team information
- Current team: SV Treffen
- Number: 15

Youth career
- –2011: Bravo
- 2011–2014: Maribor

Senior career*
Years	Team	Apps	(Gls)
2014–2017	Maribor	8	(0)
2014–2017	→ Maribor B	43	(3)
2016	→ Zarica Kranj (loan)	11	(0)
2017	Triglav Kranj	2	(0)
2018	Krka	15	(2)
2019	SC Kalsdorf	27	(1)
2020	SV Strass	0	(0)
2020-2021	FC Großklein	18	(4)
2022	GASV Pölfing-Brunn	13	(1)
2022-2023	SV Wernberg	21	(8)
2023-	SV Treffen	10	(1)

International career
2010	Slovenia U16	2	(0)
2011–2012	Slovenia U17	16	(1)
2012–2013	Slovenia U18	8	(0)
- * Club domestic league appearances and goals as of 9 February 2024

Daniel Vujčić (born 12 April 1995) is a Slovenian footballer who plays as a midfielder for Austrian 5th-tier side SV Treffen.

== Club career ==
He made his professional debut in the Slovenian PrvaLiga for Maribor on 16 May 2015 in a game against Domžale.
