= Mirza Mujčić =

Swedish footballer

Personal information
- Date of birth: 7 April 1994 (age 32)
- Place of birth: Kungälv, Sweden
- Height: 1.90 m (6 ft 3 in)
- Position: Centre-back

Team information
- Current team: NSÍ Runavík
- Number: 4

Youth career
- IK Kongahälla
- GAIS

Senior career*
Years	Team	Apps	(Gls)
2012–2014	GAIS	36	(0)
2015	Utsiktens BK	14	(0)
2015	→ FK Mjølner (loan)	9	(0)
2016–2017	Notodden FK	16	(1)
2017	Víkingur Ólafsvík	5	(0)
2017	Lysekloster IL	10	(1)
2018	Brattvåg IL	13	(1)
2019	Lysekloster IL	0	(0)
2019	Olimpija Ljubljana	7	(0)
2020–2022	Schaffhausen	55	(6)
2022–2024	Neuchâtel Xamax	11	(0)
2024–	NSÍ Runavík	9	(0)

International career
2011–2013	Sweden U19	16	(1)
- * Club domestic league appearances and goals as of 27 October 2024

Mirza Mujčić (born 7 April 1994) is a Swedish professional footballer who plays as a centre-back for Faroe Islands club NSÍ Runavík.

== Career ==
=== Schaffhausen ===
In the beginning of January 2020, Mujčić joined Swiss Challenge League club FC Schaffhausen on a deal for the rest of the season.

=== Xamax ===
On 15 May 2022, Mujčić signed a two-year contract with Neuchâtel Xamax.
