= Denis Grbić =

Slovenian footballer

Personal information
- Full name: Denis Grbić
- Date of birth: 15 March 1986 (age 40)
- Place of birth: Velenje, SFR Yugoslavia
- Height: 1.78 m (5 ft 10 in)
- Position: Striker

Team information
- Current team: SV Oftering
- Number: 10

Youth career
- 1993–2005: Rudar Velenje

Senior career*
Years	Team	Apps	(Gls)
2005–2011	Rudar Velenje	188	(32)
2010–2012	Istra	12	(3)
2012–2015	Zalaegerszeg	62	(13)
2015–2017	Rudar Velenje	24	(1)
2017–2022	SV Oftering	53	(27)
2022–2023	SV Waizenkirchen	19	(6)
2023–	SV Oftering	6	(3)
- * Club domestic league appearances and goals as of 28 October 2023

Denis Grbić (born 15 March 1986) is a Slovenian footballer who plays as a striker for Austrian lower league side Oftering.
