= Luka Prašnikar =

Slovenian footballer

Personal information
- Full name: Luka Prašnikar
- Date of birth: 11 June 1987 (age 39)
- Place of birth: Šmartno ob Paki, SFR Yugoslavia
- Position: Centre forward

Team information
- Current team: SC Kappel
- Number: 24

Youth career
- –2005: Šmartno ob Paki
- 2005–2006: Rudar Velenje

Senior career*
Years	Team	Apps	(Gls)
2005	Šmartno ob Paki	6	(0)
2006–2007	Primorje	9	(0)
2006–2007	→ Dob (loan)	26	(14)
2008–2010	Rudar Velenje	34	(7)
2010–2011	Olimpija Ljubljana	19	(2)
2011	Nafta Lendava	11	(0)
2011–2012	Šmartno 1928	23	(5)
2012–2013	Dob	36	(12)
2014	SV Wildon	15	(7)
2014	ATSV Wolfsberg	13	(1)
2015	Aluminij	10	(1)
2015–2016	Rudar Velenje	29	(4)
2017–2018	SV Eberstein	30	(17)
2019	Šmartno 1928	2	(0)
2020-	SC Kappel	70	(54)
- * Club domestic league appearances and goals as of 3 January 2024

Luka Prašnikar (born 11 June 1987) is a Slovenian footballer who plays as a forward.

== Personal life ==
He is a son of Bojan Prašnikar, a retired footballer and former manager of the Slovenia national football team.
