= Andraž Šporar =

Slovenian footballer (born 1994)

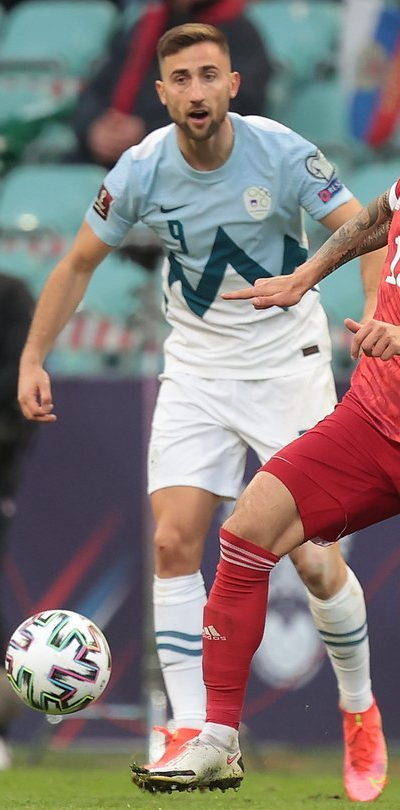
- Šporar with Slovenia in 2021

Personal information
- Date of birth: 27 February 1994 (age 32)
- Place of birth: Ljubljana, Slovenia
- Height: 1.86 m (6 ft 1 in)
- Position: Forward

Team information
- Current team: Slovan Bratislava
- Number: 99

Youth career
- 2000–2005: Olimpija
- 2005–2009: MNK Ljubljana
- 2009–2011: Interblock

Senior career*
Years	Team	Apps	(Gls)
2011–2012	Interblock	21	(10)
2012–2015	Olimpija Ljubljana	95	(46)
2016–2018	Basel	19	(1)
2017–2018	→ Arminia Bielefeld (loan)	9	(2)
2018–2020	Slovan Bratislava	53	(44)
2020–2022	Sporting CP	29	(9)
2021	→ Braga (loan)	16	(3)
2021–2022	→ Middlesbrough (loan)	35	(8)
2022–2025	Panathinaikos	63	(20)
2025	Alanyaspor	12	(3)
2025–	Slovan Bratislava	21	(17)

International career^{‡}
2012	Slovenia U19 (Note: Official competitive UEFA matches only; friendly matches are not included.)	6	(0)
2012	Slovenia U20	1	(1)
2013–2016	Slovenia U21	19	(7)
2016–	Slovenia	70	(13)
- * Club domestic league appearances and goals as of 7 November 2026 ‡ National team caps and goals as of 16 November 2026

Andraž Šporar (born 27 February 1994) is a Slovenian professional footballer who plays as a forward for Slovak First League club Slovan Bratislava and the Slovenia national team.

== Club career ==
=== Olimpija Ljubljana ===
In June 2012, Šporar transferred from Interblock to Olimpija Ljubljana. In the 2015–16 Slovenian PrvaLiga season, Šporar was named a team captain. During the first half of the club's season, he played 18 PrvaLiga games and scored 17 goals.

=== Basel ===
On 8 December 2015, Basel announced that Šporar had signed a four-and-a-half-year contract up until the end of June 2020. He joined Basel's first team for their 2015–16 season under head coach Urs Fischer. After playing in four friendly games, he made his Swiss Super League debut on 14 February 2016 in a 4–0 away win against Grasshopper Club. Just a few days later, on 18 February, Šporar got injured during warm-up before the away match against Saint-Étienne. The torn tendon required surgery and this kept Šporar out for the rest of the season. At the end of the season his team won the 2015–16 Swiss Super League championship.

Šporar scored his first goal for Basel on 15 April 2017 in a 4–0 away victory over Lausanne-Sport. At the end of the 2016–17 Super League season, Šporar won the championship for the second time. For the club this was the eighth title in a row and their 20th championship title in total. They also won the 2016–17 Swiss Cup, defeating Sion 3–0 in the final.

Despite this success, Šporar decided to leave the club. He played a total of 26 competitive games for Basel, and scored one goal.

==== Arminia Bielefeld (loan) ====
On 25 June 2017, Šporar joined 2. Bundesliga side Arminia Bielefeld on loan for the 2017–18 season.

=== Slovan Bratislava ===
Šporar joined the Slovak First League side Slovan Bratislava in January 2018 for a reported fee of €600,000. In his first season, he won the 2017–18 Slovak Cup. In the 2018–19 season, Slovan won the league title, and Šporar became the league's top scorer with 29 goals, equaling the record for the number of goals scored in a season in the Slovak First League.

=== Sporting ===
On 23 January 2020, Šporar transferred to Sporting CP on a five-year contract for a transfer fee of €6 million, making him the most expensive player in the history of the Slovak Super Liga. With bonuses, the total transfer fee may eventually rise above €7 million.

==== Braga (loan) ====
On 1 February 2021, Šporar joined Braga on loan for the remainder of the 2020–21 season.

==== Middlesbrough (loan) ====
In August 2021, he joined English side Middlesbrough on loan. He scored his first goal for the club in a 2–0 win against Nottingham Forest on 15 September 2021.

=== Panathinaikos ===
On 27 July 2022, Šporar signed a four-year contract with Super League Greece side Panathinaikos for a reported transfer fee of over €3 million.

== International career ==
In November 2016, Šporar received his first call-up to the Slovenia senior squad for the matches against Malta and Poland. He debuted against the former, replacing Milivoje Novaković late in the second half.

On 7 September 2023, Šporar scored two goals against Northern Ireland, becoming the tenth player in the Slovenia national team's history to reach double digits of international goals.

In June 2024, Šporar was included in the 26-man Slovenian squad for UEFA Euro 2024, his first major international tournament.

== Personal life ==
Andraž Šporar is the son of Olimpija's former captain Miha Šporar. In the past, Šporar has stated his ambition to earn a move to Liverpool, which is his favourite club. Liverpool followed the player in 2015, but in the end there was no transfer.

== Career statistics ==
=== Club ===
As of match played 7 November 2026

Appearances and goals by club, season and competition
Club	Season	League			National cup (Note: Includes Slovenian Cup, Swiss Cup, DFB-Pokal, Slovak Cup, Taça de Portugal, FA Cup, Greek Cup, Turkish Cup)		League cup (Note: Includes Taça da Liga)		Continental		Other		Total	
Club	Season	Division	Apps	Goals	Apps	Goals	Apps	Goals	Apps	Goals	Apps	Goals	Apps	Goals
Interblock	2011–12	Slovenian Second League	21	10	3	1	—		—		—		24	11
Olimpija Ljubljana	2012–13	Slovenian PrvaLiga	28	11	2	0	—		4 (Note: Appearances in UEFA Europa League)	0	1 (Note: Appearances in Slovenian Supercup)	0	35	11
Olimpija Ljubljana	2013–14	Slovenian PrvaLiga	17	5	3	3	—		2	1	1	0	23	9
Olimpija Ljubljana	2014–15	Slovenian PrvaLiga	32	13	2	0	—		—		—		34	13
Olimpija Ljubljana	2015–16	Slovenian PrvaLiga	18	17	2	0	—		—		—		20	17
Olimpija Ljubljana	Total		95	46	9	3	0	0	6	1	2	0	112	50
Basel	2015–16	Swiss Super League	1	0	0	0	—		0	0	—		1	0
Basel	2016–17	Swiss Super League	18	1	3	0	—		4 (Note: Appearances in UEFA Champions League)	0	—		25	1
Basel	Total		19	1	3	0	0	0	4	0	0	0	26	1
Arminia Bielefeld (loan)	2017–18	2. Bundesliga	9	2	1	0	—		—		—		10	2
Slovan Bratislava	2017–18	Slovak First League	12	3	4	3	—		0	0	—		16	6
Slovan Bratislava	2018–19	Slovak First League	30	29	0	0	—		6	5	—		36	34
Slovan Bratislava	2019–20	Slovak First League	11	12	1	1	—		14 (Note: Two appearances and one goal in UEFA Champions League, twelve appearances and six goals in UEFA Europa League)	7	—		26	20
Slovan Bratislava	Total		53	44	5	4	0	0	20	12	0	0	78	60
Sporting CP	2019–20	Primeira Liga	16	6	0	0	0	0	2	1	—		18	7
Sporting CP	2020–21	Primeira Liga	13	3	3	0	2	1	2	0	—		20	4
Sporting CP	Total		29	9	3	0	2	1	4	1	0	0	38	11
Braga (loan)	2020–21	Primeira Liga	16	3	3	0	0	0	2	0	—		21	3
Middlesbrough (loan)	2021–22	Championship	35	8	2	0	0	0	—		—		37	8
Panathinaikos	2022–23	Super League Greece	32	11	3	2	—		2 (Note: Appearances in UEFA Conference League)	1	—		37	14
Panathinaikos	2023–24	Super League Greece	27	8	4	1	—		12 (Note: Six appearances and three goals in UEFA Champions League, six appearances and one goal in UEFA Europa League)	4	—		43	13
Panathinaikos	2024–25	Super League Greece	4	1	0	0	—		5 (Note: Two appearances in UEFA Europa League, three appearances in UEFA Conference League)	0	—		9	1
Panathinaikos	Total		63	20	7	3	0	0	19	5	0	0	89	28
Alanyaspor	2024–25	Süper Lig	10	3	1	0	—		—		—		11	3
Alanyaspor	2025–26	Süper Lig	2	0	0	0	—		—		—		2	0
Alanyaspor	Total		12	3	1	0	—		—		—		13	3
Slovan Bratislava	2025–26	Slovak First League	13	12	1	0	—		3	0	—		17	12
Slovan Bratislava	2026–27	Slovak First League	8	5	0	0	—		6	2	—		14	7
Slovan Bratislava	Total		21	17	1	0	—		9	2	—		31	19
Career total			373	163	38	11	2	1	64	21	2	0	479	196

=== International ===
Scores and results list Slovenia's goal tally first, score column indicates score after each Šporar goal.

List of international goals scored by Andraž Šporar
No.	Date	Venue	Opponent	Score	Result	Competition
1	21 March 2019	Sammy Ofer Stadium, Haifa, Israel	Israel	1–0	1–1	UEFA Euro 2020 qualification
2	6 September 2019	Stožice Stadium, Ljubljana, Slovenia	Poland	2–0	2–0	UEFA Euro 2020 qualification
3	4 June 2021	Bonifika Stadium, Koper, Slovenia	Gibraltar	1–0	6–0	Friendly
4	4 June 2021	Bonifika Stadium, Koper, Slovenia	Gibraltar	3–0	6–0	Friendly
5	8 October 2021	National Stadium, Ta' Qali, Malta	Malta	2–0	4–0	2022 FIFA World Cup qualification
6	24 September 2022	Stožice Stadium, Ljubljana, Slovenia	Norway	1–1	2–1	2022–23 UEFA Nations League B
7	17 November 2022	Cluj Arena, Cluj-Napoca, Romania	Romania	2–0	2–1	Friendly
8	19 June 2023	Stožice Stadium, Ljubljana, Slovenia	Denmark	1–0	1–1	UEFA Euro 2024 qualification
9	7 September 2023	Stožice Stadium, Ljubljana, Slovenia	Northern Ireland	1–0	4–2	UEFA Euro 2024 qualification
10	7 September 2023	Stožice Stadium, Ljubljana, Slovenia	Northern Ireland	4–2	4–2	UEFA Euro 2024 qualification
11	21 March 2024	National Stadium, Ta' Qali, Malta	Malta	1–0	2–2	Friendly
12	8 June 2024	Stožice Stadium, Ljubljana, Slovenia	Bulgaria	1–1	1–1	Friendly
13	7 June 2026	Stadion Varteks, Varaždin, Croatia	Croatia	1–1	1–2	Friendly

== Honours ==
Basel

- Swiss Super League: 2015–16, 2016–17
- Swiss Cup: 2016–17

Slovan Bratislava

- Slovak First League: 2018–19, 2025–26
- Slovak Cup: 2017–18

Sporting CP

- Primeira Liga: 2020–21
- Taça da Liga: 2020–21

Braga

- Taça de Portugal: 2020–21

Panathinaikos

- Greek Cup: 2023–24

Individual

- Slovenian PrvaLiga Top Scorer: 2015–16
- Slovak First League Top Scorer: 2018–19, 2019–20
- Slovak First League Player of the Year: 2018–19
- Slovak First League Player of the Month: November/December 2018, May 2019, November/December 2019
- Slovak First League Goal of the Month: October 2019
- Slovak First League Team of the Season: 2018–19, 2019–20, 2025–26
- Super League Greece Player of the Month: August 2022
