= Darko Brljak =

Slovenian football goalkeeper

Personal information
- Full name: Darko Brljak
- Date of birth: 23 December 1984 (age 41)
- Place of birth: Ljubljana, SFR Yugoslavia
- Height: 1.95 m (6 ft 5 in)
- Position: Goalkeeper

Youth career
- –2003: Dob

Senior career*
Years	Team	Apps	(Gls)
2003–2006	Dob	51	(0)
2006–2011	Domžale	52	(0)
2011–2012	Gorica	15	(0)
2012–2013	Eger	14	(0)
2013	Radomlje	10	(0)
2014–2015	Flota Świnoujście	34	(0)
2015–2016	Olimpija Ljubljana	17	(0)
2017	Bravo		
- * Club domestic league appearances and goals

Darko Brljak (born 23 December 1984) is a Slovenian former professional footballer who played as a goalkeeper.

Brljak joined Gorica from Domžale in summer 2011. After a spell at Olimpija Ljubljana, he agreed terms with NK Bravo in February 2017.

== Honours ==
Domžale

- Slovenian PrvaLiga: 2006–07, 2007–08
- Slovenian Supercup: 2007

Olimpija Ljubljana

- Slovenian PrvaLiga: 2015–16
