= Amer Krcić =

Slovenian footballer

Personal information
- Full name: Amer Krcić
- Date of birth: 23 May 1989 (age 37)
- Place of birth: Kranj, SFR Yugoslavia
- Height: 1.75 m (5 ft 9 in)
- Position: Midfielder

Team information
- Current team: DSG Sele Zell
- Number: 10

Youth career
- 1995–1997: Triglav Kranj
- 1997–2006: Triglav Kranj
- 2006–2007: Sava Kranj
- 2007–2008: Domžale

Senior career*
Years	Team	Apps	(Gls)
2009–2012	Domžale	57	(4)
2008–2009	→ Zarica Kranj (loan)	6	(1)
2009–2010	→ Dob (loan)	14	(11)
2012–2013	Dob	22	(13)
2013–2014	Krka	10	(1)
2014–2015	Dob	24	(11)
2015–2017	Rudar Velenje	26	(3)
2017	Radomlje	7	(0)
2017–2019	SAK Klagenfurt	69	(4)
2020	Klagenfurter AC 1909	0	(0)
2020–2021	SAK Klagenfurt	13	(0)
2022	SV Donau Klagenfurt	26	(7)
2023-	DSG Sele Zell	24	(2)

International career
2009	Slovenia U20	1	(0)
- * Club domestic league appearances and goals as of 9 December 2023

Amer Krcić (born 23 May 1989) is a Slovenian football midfielder who plays for DSG Sele Zell.

== Honours ==
Domžale

- Slovenian Championship: 2007–08
- Slovenian Cup: 2010–11
