= Matic Žitko =

Slovenian footballer

Personal information
- Date of birth: 21 February 1990 (age 36)
- Place of birth: SFR Yugoslavia
- Height: 1.83 m (6 ft 0 in)
- Position: Centre-back

Youth career
- –2005: Olimpija
- 2005–2007: Svoboda
- 2008–2009: Interblock

Senior career*
Years	Team	Apps	(Gls)
2009–2012	Interblock	42	(0)
2009	→ Ivančna Gorica (loan)	1	(0)
2012–2015	Celje	75	(1)
2015	Rudar Velenje	12	(0)
2016–2019	Olimpia Grudziądz	74	(1)
2019–2020	Chojniczanka Chojnice	4	(0)

International career
2008	Slovenia U18	2	(0)
2009	Slovenia U19	2	(0)
- * Club domestic league appearances and goals

Matic Žitko (born 21 February 1990) is a Slovenian former professional footballer who played as a centre-back.
