= Martin Mimoun =

French footballer (born 1992)

Personal information
- Full name: Martin Michel Mimoun
- Date of birth: 11 June 1992 (age 34)
- Place of birth: Compiègne, France
- Height: 1.76 m (5 ft 9 in)
- Position: Midfielder

Youth career
- 2005-2008: INF Clairefontaine
- 2008–2010: Paris Saint-Germain

Senior career*
Years	Team	Apps	(Gls)
2010–2015	Laval	25	(2)
2013	→ US Quevilly (loan)	19	(3)
2015–2016	Olimpija Ljubljana	25	(0)
2016–2017	US Créteil	26	(9)
2017	Bastia	0	(0)
2017–2018	Paris FC	8	(1)
2017–2018	→ Paris FC II	6	(0)
2018	Politehnica Iași	5	(0)
2019	Virton	4	(1)
2019–2020	Les Herbiers	16	(1)
2020	Villefranche	4	(0)
- * Club domestic league appearances and goals as of 13:02, 1 February 2023 (UTC)

Martin Michel Mimoun (born 11 June 1992) is a French-Moroccan professional footballer who plays as a midfielder.

== Career ==
Martin started his football career at INF Clairefontaine before he proceeded to Paris Saint-Germain Academy in 2008.

In 2010, Mimoun signed for French club Laval and went on to make 25 league appearances for the club.

=== Olimpija Ljubljana ===
On 7 July 2015, Mimoun secured a three-year footballing contract with Slovenian side Olimpija Ljubljana on a free transfer. He left the club only a year later, when he terminated his contract on 9 August 2016.

=== Virton ===
In February 2019, he moved to Virton.

== Personal life ==
Mimoun is the grandson of the former football coach Michel Le Millinaire. His father, Nordine Mimoun, is a Moroccan born in Algeria. He holds Algerian and Moroccan nationalities and also was a footballer. Martin Mimoun holds French and Moroccan nationalities.

== Honours ==
Olimpija Ljubljana

- Slovenian PrvaLiga: 2015–16
