= Nik Kapun =

Slovenian footballer

Personal information
- Date of birth: 9 January 1994 (age 32)
- Place of birth: Ljubljana, Slovenia
- Height: 1.84 m (6 ft 0 in)
- Position: Midfielder

Team information
- Current team: Krka

Youth career
- –2011: Factor / Interblock
- 2011–2013: Olimpija Ljubljana

Senior career*
Years	Team	Apps	(Gls)
2013–2022	Olimpija Ljubljana	165	(13)
2022–2023	Liepāja	18	(0)
2023	Brinje Grosuplje	9	(0)
2024–	Krka	0	(0)

International career
2014–2016	Slovenia U21	12	(0)
- * Club domestic league appearances and goals as of 23 January 2024

Nik Kapun (born 9 January 1994) is a Slovenian footballer who plays as a midfielder for Krka.

== International career ==
Kapun received his first call-up to the senior Slovenia squad for the UEFA Euro 2016 qualifiers against Switzerland and Estonia in September 2015.

== Honours ==
Olimpija Ljubljana

- Slovenian PrvaLiga: 2015–16, 2017–18
- Slovenian Cup: 2017–18, 2018–19, 2020–21
