= Nikola Tolimir =

Slovenian footballer (born 1989)

Personal information
- Full name: Nikola Tolimir
- Date of birth: 1 April 1989 (age 37)
- Place of birth: Slovenj Gradec, SFR Yugoslavia
- Height: 1.87 m (6 ft 1 1/2 in)
- Position: Midfielder

Team information
- Current team: SVG Bleiburg
- Number: 6

Youth career
- 2000–2008: Rudar Velenje

Senior career*
Years	Team	Apps	(Gls)
2007–2012	Rudar Velenje	134	(11)
2012–2013	Ceahlăul Piatra Neamț	8	(1)
2013	EN Paralimni	2	(0)
2014–2017	Rudar Velenje	55	(2)
2017	Annabichler SV	16	(0)
2018–	SVG Bleiburg	152	(11)

International career
2008–2010	Slovenia U20	8	(1)
2009–2010	Slovenia U21	12	(0)
- * Club domestic league appearances and goals as of 3 February 2024

Nikola Tolimir (born 1 April 1989 in Slovenj Gradec) is a Slovenian football midfielder, who plays for Austrian 4th-tier side SVG Bleiburg.
