= Ivan Knezović =

Croatian footballer

Personal information
- Full name: Ivan Knezović
- Date of birth: 25 September 1982 (age 44)
- Place of birth: Split, SFR Yugoslavia
- Height: 1.89 m (6 ft 2 in)
- Position: Defender

Youth career
- Omiš

Senior career*
Years	Team	Apps	(Gls)
1999–2002	Hajduk Split	0	(0)
2002–2003	Solin		
2003–2004	Sloboda Tuzla	1	(0)
2004–2005	Omiš		
2005–2006	Koper	30	(4)
2006–2009	Domžale	79	(4)
2009–2010	Solin	21	(1)
2010–2013	Domžale	68	(8)
2013–2016	Rudar Velenje	81	(5)
- * Club domestic league appearances and goals as of 31 May 2016

Ivan Knezović (born 25 September 1982 in Split) is a retired Croatian football defender.

== Honours ==
- Slovenian PrvaLiga: 2006–07, 2007–08
- Slovenian Supercup: 2007
