= David Kašnik =

Slovenian footballer (born 1987)

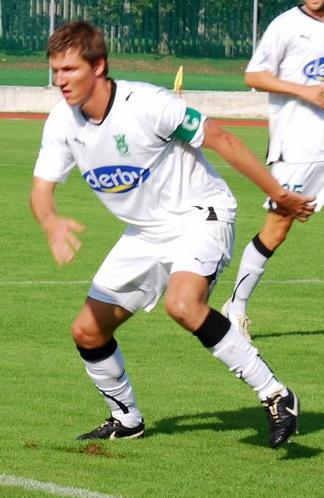
- Kašnik playing for Olimpija

Personal information
- Date of birth: 16 January 1987 (age 39)
- Place of birth: Slovenj Gradec, SFR Yugoslavia
- Height: 1.85 m (6 ft 1 in)
- Position: Defender

Team information
- Current team: GSV St. Martin/Sulmtal

Youth career
- Dravograd

Senior career*
Years	Team	Apps	(Gls)
–2008	Dravograd	17	(1)
2008–2012	Olimpija Ljubljana	83	(3)
2011	→ Sheffield Wednesday (loan)	0	(0)
2012	Aluminij	14	(0)
2013–2021	Rudar Velenje	162	(9)
2021	Fužinar	15	(2)
2022–2025	USV Wies	75	(18)
2025–	GSV St. Martin/Sulmtal	23	(7)
- * Club domestic league appearances and goals as of 7 July 2026

David Kašnik (born 16 January 1987) is a Slovenian footballer who plays as a defender for Austrian side GSV St. Martin/Sulmtal.

== Club career ==
Kašnik started his career with Dravograd. When he was 14 years old, a serious knee injury prevented him from playing football for a year and a half. He fully recovered and moved to Olimpija Ljubljana after an initial trial, and signed a contract in August 2008.

He rarely played in his first season when Olimpija won the Slovenian second division title. During the summer of 2009 the majority of the experienced players left the club and Kašnik found himself in the first team.

Kašnik signed on loan for English side Sheffield Wednesday of EFL League One in August 2011. He left the club at the end of 2011 without having played for the side.
