= Mario Babić =

Croatian footballer

Personal information
- Date of birth: 3 July 1992 (age 34)
- Place of birth: Zagreb, Croatia
- Height: 1.77 m (5 ft 9 1/2 in)
- Position: Midfielder

Team information
- Current team: Kustošija
- Number: 13

Youth career
- –2007: Dinamo Zagreb
- 2007–2010: Zagreb
- 2010–2011: Dinamo Zagreb

Senior career*
Years	Team	Apps	(Gls)
2011–2013	Dinamo Zagreb	0	(0)
2011–2013	→ Sesvete (loan)	55	(9)
2013–2014	Istra 1961	9	(1)
2014–2016	Rudar Velenje	71	(4)
2016–2018	Tubize	36	(2)
2018–2019	Široki Brijeg	22	(1)
2019–2021	Tabor Sežana	42	(7)
2021	Sambenedettese	6	(0)
2021	Sesvete	10	(0)
2022–	Kustošija	45	(3)

International career
2007	Croatia U15	3	(1)
2008	Croatia U16	5	(0)
2008–2009	Croatia U17	4	(0)
2009–2010	Croatia U18	8	(2)
2009–2011	Croatia U19	17	(2)
2011–2013	Croatia U20	8	(0)
- * Club domestic league appearances and goals as of 19 June 2023

Mario Babić (born 3 July 1992) is a Croatian footballer who currently plays for second tier Kustošija.

== Club career ==
On 24 February 2021, he joined Sambenedettese in Italian Serie C. On 14 July 2021, his contract with Sambenedettese was terminated by mutual consent.

== Cinema ==
In 2018, he was tricked in the Belgian film Mon Ket. In this movie, filmed with a hidden camera, he is invited to a birthday party for the son of the protagonist.
