= Milan Kocić =

Slovenian footballer (born 1990)

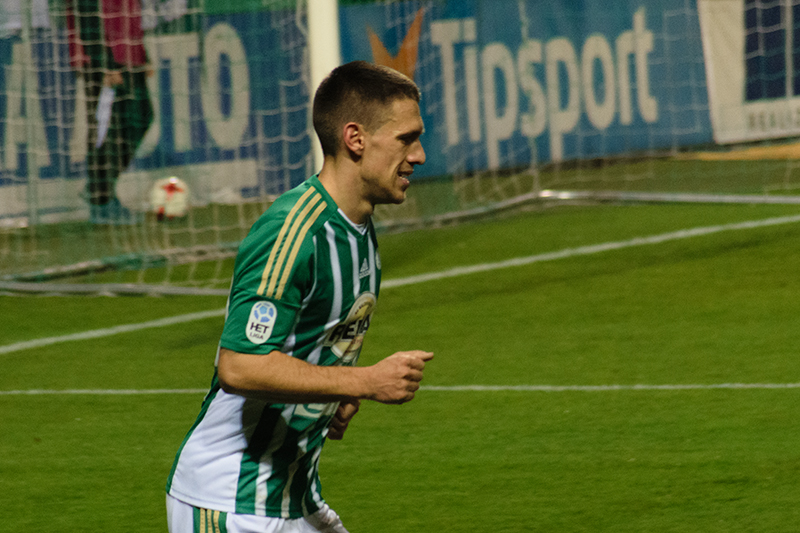
- Kocić with Bohemians 1905 in 2017

Personal information
- Date of birth: 16 February 1990 (age 36)
- Height: 1.77 m (5 ft 10 in)
- Positions: Left-back; midfielder

Team information
- Current team: Brian Lignano

Youth career
- –2006: Tabor Sežana
- 2006–2009: Chievo
- 2009–2010: Gorica

Senior career*
Years	Team	Apps	(Gls)
2010–2013	Triestina		
2013	Shumen	9	(3)
2013	TSV Hartberg	16	(2)
2014–2016	Rudar Velenje	70	(2)
2016–2017	Aluminij	32	(0)
2017–2018	Bohemians	26	(0)
2018–2019	Panionios	13	(0)
2019–2021	Voluntari	21	(0)
2021–2022	Chindia Târgoviște	25	(0)
2022	Tabor Sežana	13	(1)
2022–2024	Clivense		
2024–	Brian Lignano	33	(1)
- * Club domestic league appearances and goals as of 12 April 2025

Milan Kocić (born 16 February 1990) is a Slovenian footballer who plays as a defender for Italian Serie D club Brian Lignano.

== Club career ==
Kocić had a spell at Austrian second-tier side TSV Hartberg in 2013. He joined Clivense in December 2022.
