= Damjan Trifković =

Slovenian footballer (born 1987)

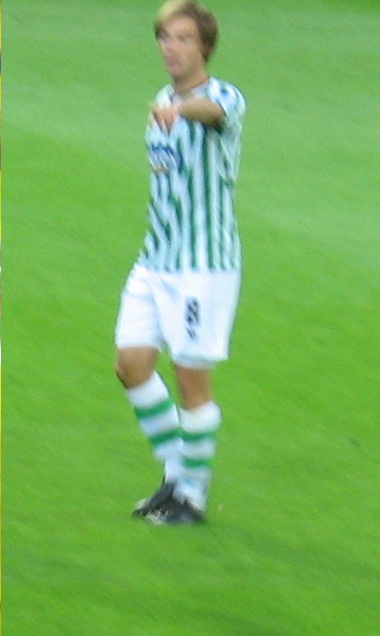

Personal information
- Full name: Damjan Trifković
- Date of birth: 22 July 1987 (age 39)
- Place of birth: Slovenj Gradec, SFR Yugoslavia
- Height: 1.81 m (5 ft 11 1/2 in)
- Position: Attacking midfielder

Youth career
- –2005: Rudar Velenje

Senior career*
Years	Team	Apps	(Gls)
2006–2012	Rudar Velenje	181	(26)
2012–2014	Olimpija Ljubljana	56	(6)
2014–2020	Rudar Velenje	171	(11)
Total		408	(43)

International career
2008	Slovenia U21	3	(0)
- * Club domestic league appearances and goals

Damjan Trifković (born 22 July 1987) is a Slovenian retired footballer who played as a midfielder.
