= Damir Grgić =

Slovenian basketball coach

Damir Grgić is a Slovenian basketball coach who managed the Slovenian national team at the 2017, 2019, and 2021 Eurobasket.
