= Matej Radan =

Slovenian football goalkeeper (born 1990)

Personal information
- Date of birth: 13 May 1990 (age 36)
- Place of birth: Maribor, SFR Yugoslavia
- Height: 1.89 m (6 ft 2 in)
- Position: Goalkeeper

Team information
- Current team: TuS Heiligenkreuz
- Number: 1

Youth career
- –2009: Maribor
- 2006: → Železničar Maribor (loan)

Senior career*
Years	Team	Apps	(Gls)
2009–2013	Maribor	24	(0)
2010	→ Malečnik (loan)	11	(0)
2010	→ Mura 05 (loan)	8	(0)
2013	→ Dravinja (loan)	9	(0)
2013–2021	Rudar Velenje	106	(0)
2021–2022	SV Allerheiligen II	11	(0)
2022–2023	Jurovski Dol	6	(1)
2023–	TuS Heiligenkreuz	5	(0)

International career
2007	Slovenia U17		
2009	Slovenia U19		
2010–2011	Slovenia U21		
- * Club domestic league appearances and goals as of 19 July 2024

Matej Radan (born 13 May 1990) is a Slovenian footballer who plays as a goalkeeper for TuS Heiligenkreuz.

== Honours ==
Maribor

- Slovenian Championship: 2010–11, 2011–12, 2012–13
- Slovenian Cup: 2009–10, 2011–12, 2012–13
- Slovenian Supercup: 2012
