= Senad Jahić =

Slovenian footballer

Personal information
- Full name: Senad Jahić
- Date of birth: 13 May 1987 (age 39)
- Place of birth: SFR Yugoslavia
- Position: Right-back

Team information
- Current team: ASKÖ St. Michael ob Bleiburg
- Number: 13

Youth career
- –2006: Rudar Velenje

Senior career*
Years	Team	Apps	(Gls)
2006–2009	Rudar Velenje	31	(3)
2008	→ Šmartno 1928 (loan)	8	(0)
2008	→ Krško (loan)	9	(0)
2009	→ Šmartno 1928 (loan)	10	(1)
2009	Šentjur	9	(0)
2010–2012	Šmartno 1928	50	(5)
2012–2017	Rudar Velenje	111	(4)
2017	Annabichler SV	15	(1)
2018	USV Grenzland	24	(16)
2019–2020	SVG Bleiburg	26	(2)
2020-	ASKÖ St. Michael ob Bleiburg	59	(5)
- * Club domestic league appearances and goals as of 3 November 2023

Senad Jahić (born 13 May 1987) is a Slovenian football defender.
