= Ob Jezeru City Stadium =

Multi-use stadium in Velenje, Slovenia

Ob Jezeru
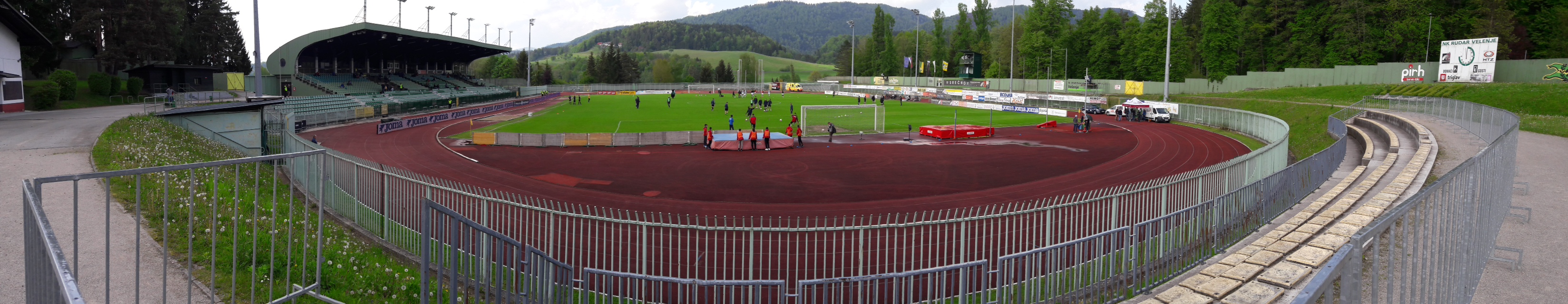
- Ob Jezeru City Stadium in 2017
- Interactive map of Ob Jezeru
- Full name: Mestni stadion Ob jezeru
- Location: Velenje, Slovenia
- Coordinates: 46°22′22″N 15°6′15″E
- Owner: City Municipality of Velenje
- Operator: Športno rekreacijski zavod Rdeča dvorana
- Capacity: 1,864

Construction
- Built: 1955
- Renovated: 1992, 1998, 2010

Tenant
- NK Rudar Velenje

Ob Jezeru City Stadium (Slovene: Mestni stadion Ob jezeru; literally 'Lakeside City Stadium') is a multi-use stadium in Velenje, Slovenia. It is used mostly for football matches and is the home ground of NK Rudar Velenje. The stadium is also used for athletics. Built in 1955, it was renovated in 1992 when a covered grandstand was built. In 1998, the stadium received floodlights. It has a capacity for 1,864 spectators.

== See also ==
- List of football stadiums in Slovenia
