= Klemen Bolha =

Slovenian football midfielder

Personal information
- Full name: Klemen Bolha
- Date of birth: 19 March 1993 (age 33)
- Place of birth: Slovenia
- Height: 1.73 m (5 ft 8 in)
- Position: Midfielder

Youth career
- Šmartno 1928
- 2011–2012: Rudar Velenje

Senior career*
Years	Team	Apps	(Gls)
2009	Šmartno 1928	4	(1)
2011	Šmartno 1928	1	(0)
2012–2019	Rudar Velenje	153	(8)
2012–2014	→ Šmartno 1928 (loan)	48	(7)
2019–2020	Žalgiris	21	(0)
2021–2022	Aluminij	47	(1)
2022–2023	Napredak	24	(0)
- * Club domestic league appearances and goals as of 2025

Klemen Bolha (born 19 March 1993) is a Slovenian professional footballer.

== Club career ==
Bolha joined Aluminij in January 2021 after a two-year spell at Lithuanian giants Žalgiris.

He left Serbian top tier-side Napredak in summer 2023 after only one season at the club.
