= Mate Eterović =

Croatian footballer (born 1984)

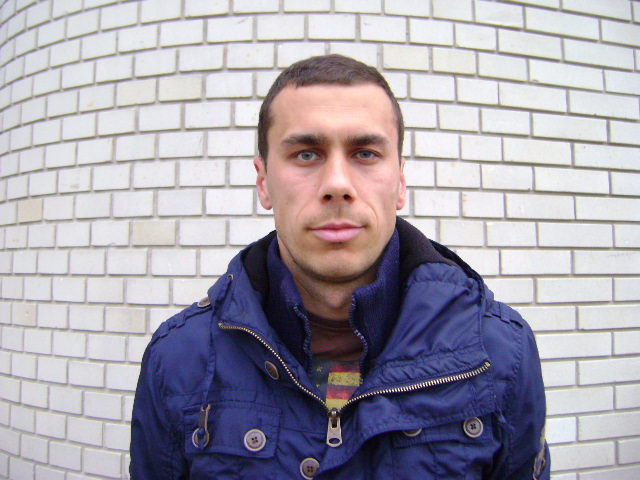

Personal information
- Full name: Mate Eterović
- Date of birth: 13 July 1984 (age 42)
- Place of birth: Split, SFR Yugoslavia
- Height: 1.83 m (6 ft 0 in)
- Position: Forward

Youth career
- 1994–1999: Hajduk Split
- 1999–2003: Dinamo Zagreb

Senior career*
Years	Team	Apps	(Gls)
2003–2004	Solin	4	(1)
2004	Jadran Supetar	4	(1)
2004–2005	GOŠK Adriachem	18	(10)
2005–2006	Maribor	8	(1)
2006	Aluminij	11	(2)
2006–2008	Nafta Lendava	53	(16)
2008	Debreceni II	2	(0)
2009	Solin	15	(1)
2009–2010	Kalamata	25	(4)
2010–2011	Postira Sardi	22	(39)
2011–2012	Mura 05	45	(15)
2013–2014	Rudar Velenje	51	(26)
2014	Paykan	11	(1)
2015–2016	Domžale	8	(0)
2015–2016	→ Rudar Velenje (loan)	33	(7)
2017–2021	Postira Sardi	86	(34)
Total		396	(158)
- * Club domestic league appearances and goals as of 20 December 2016

Mate Eterović (born 13 July 1984) is a Croatian retired footballer who last played for Postira Sardi.

== Club career ==
Eterović began his career with Solin in the Croatian Druga HNL. He moved abroad to play for Maribor and Nafta Lendava in the Slovenian PrvaLiga and Debreceni II in the Hungarian NB II before returning to Solin in 2008. Before joining Mura 05, he played for Postira-Sardi in the 4. HNL. He joined club in 2010 and soon he became league top scorer. He scored six goals in record win of 13–1 against Slaven Gruda. He managed to score 39 goals in 22 games. On 29 May 2011 Mate played for a selection of football players from the island of Brač. They played a friendly match against the Croatia national football team. Eterović scored the only goal for his team from a penalty in a 1–8 defeat. He joined Slovenian club ND Mura 05 on 24 June 2011. Eterović scored his first goal for Mura 05 on 17 October 2011 in 1–0 win over Celje.
