= Jaka Ihbeisheh =

Palestinian footballer

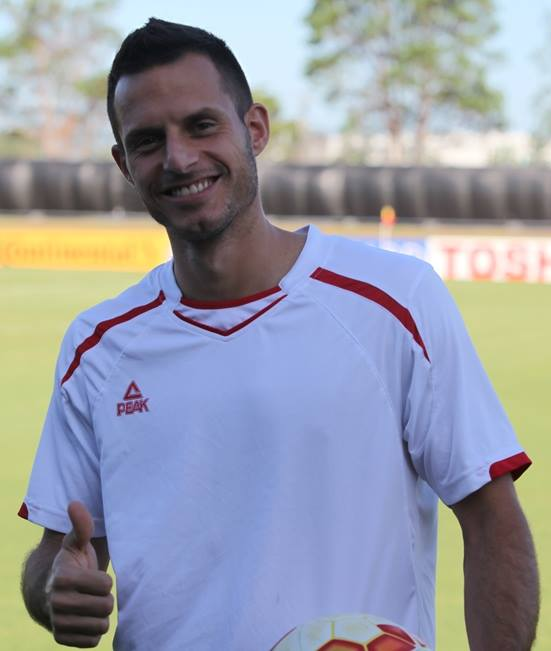

Personal information
- Full name: Jaka Fayed Allah Patrik Ihbeisheh
- Date of birth: 29 August 1986 (age 40)
- Place of birth: Ljubljana, SFR Yugoslavia
- Height: 1.72 m (5 ft 7 1/2 in)
- Positions: Midfielder; full-back

Youth career
- Komenda
- –2005: Factor

Senior career*
Years	Team	Apps	(Gls)
2003–2006	Factor	32	(1)
2006	→ Slovan (loan)	10	(2)
2006	→ Svoboda Ljubljana (loan)	4	(4)
2007	Slovan	16	(12)
2008	Krka	12	(4)
2008–2009	Aluminij	12	(3)
2009	Krško	11	(6)
2009–2011	Primorje	57	(8)
2011–2012	Rudar Velenje	4	(0)
2012–2013	Domžale	17	(2)
2013–2015	Krka	58	(3)
2015–2016	Rudar Velenje	26	(0)
2016–2017	Al Shamal		
2017	BEC Tero Sasana	8	(0)
2018	SV Stegersbach	11	(2)
2018	Krka	3	(0)
2018–2020	Bravo	35	(2)
2020–2021	Radomlje	31	(2)
Total		347	(51)

International career
2014–2018	Palestine	17	(3)
- * Club domestic league appearances and goals

Jaka Ihbeisheh (Arabic: ياكا حبيشة; born 29 August 1986) is a retired footballer. Born in Slovenia, he represented Palestine internationally.

== International career ==
In 2014, Ihbeisheh made his debut for the Palestinian national team. He was included in the Palestinian squad for the 2015 AFC Asian Cup and scored the nation's first ever Asian Cup goal, which was also his first international goal, during a 5–1 defeat against Jordan in the group stage.

== Personal life ==
Ihbeisheh was born in Ljubljana to a Palestinian father and Slovenian mother and grew up in Slovenia. After his family separated when he was three years old, he only reconnected with his father, in Ramallah, 18 years later through Facebook.

== Career statistics ==
=== International ===
Scores and results list Palestine's goal tally first, score column indicates score after each Ihbeisheh goal.

List of international goals scored by Jaka Ihbeisheh
No.	Date	Venue	Opponent	Score	Result	Competition
1	16 January 2015	Melbourne Rectangular Stadium, Melbourne, Australia	Jordan	1–5	1–5	2015 AFC Asian Cup
2	12 November 2015	Amman International Stadium, Amman, Jordan	Malaysia	6–0	6–0	2018 FIFA World Cup qualification
3	29 March 2016	Dora International Stadium, Hebron, Palestine	Timor-Leste	1–0	7–0	2018 FIFA World Cup qualification
