= Leon Črnčič =

Slovenian footballer

Personal information
- Date of birth: 2 March 1990 (age 36)
- Height: 1.85 m (6 ft 1 in)
- Position: Midfielder

Team information
- Current team: Jurovski Dol

Youth career
- –2002: Lenart
- 2002–2007: Jarenina
- 2007–2008: Maribor
- 2008–2009: Aluminij
- 2009–2010: Atalanta Primavera

Senior career*
Years	Team	Apps	(Gls)
2008–2009	Aluminij	9	(0)
2010–2011	Leicester City	0	(0)
2011–2021	Rudar Velenje	246	(20)
2021–2022	SV Wildon	21	(1)
2022–	Jurovski Dol		

International career
2007	Slovenia U17	2	(0)
2009	Slovenia U19	5	(0)
2010	Slovenia U20	1	(0)
2009–2012	Slovenia U21	14	(1)
- * Club domestic league appearances and goals

Leon Črnčič (born 2 March 1990) is a Slovenian football midfielder who plays for Jurovski Dol.

== Club career ==
Črnčič was under contract at English side Leicester City and also had a spell with Austrian fourth-tier outfit SV Wildon.
