= Elvedin Džinić =

Slovenian footballer (born 1985)

Personal information
- Full name: Elvedin Džinić
- Date of birth: 25 August 1985 (age 41)
- Place of birth: Maribor, SFR Yugoslavia
- Height: 1.86 m (6 ft 1 in)
- Position: Centre-back

Youth career
- Železničar Maribor
- –2004: Maribor

Senior career*
Years	Team	Apps	(Gls)
2002–2011	Maribor	140	(16)
2004	→ Železničar Maribor (loan)	9	(0)
2004–2005	→ Dravinja (loan)	19	(1)
2011–2013	Charleroi	65	(4)
2013	Botev Plovdiv	10	(0)
2014	Zagłębie Lubin	13	(0)
2014–2016	Rudar Velenje	49	(7)
2016–2019	Celje	74	(8)
2019–2020	Rudar Velenje	20	(0)
2021–2023	SV Strass	41	(8)

International career
2006	Slovenia U21	1	(0)
- * Club domestic league appearances and goals as of 7 October 2023

Elvedin Džinić (born 25 August 1985) is a Slovenian former professional footballer who played as a centre-back.

== Club career ==
In 2005, he signed his first professional contract with NK Maribor. He played for the club between 2005 and 2010 and made a total of 140 appearances and scored 16 goals in the Slovenian PrvaLiga. In the 2009–10 season, he was voted by the fans as the most distinguished Maribor player.

On 10 January 2011, Džinić signed a contract with Belgian club Charleroi after refusing to renew his contract with Maribor, which would expire on 31 May 2011.

On 25 June 2013, Džinić signed a two-year contract with Botev Plovdiv in Bulgaria.

== International career ==
Džinić was a member of the Slovenia national under-21 team, making one official appearance in September 2006. He was part of the senior squad at the 2010 FIFA World Cup. However, he was never capped for the national team.

== Honours ==
Maribor

- Slovenian PrvaLiga: 2008–09
- Slovenian Cup: 2009–10
- Slovenian Supercup: 2009
