= 2015–16 FC Koper season =

FC Koper
2015–16 season
- President: Valter Valenčič
- Head Coach: Milan Obradović
- Stadium: Bonifika Stadium
- Slovenian League: 8th
- Slovenian Cup: Quarter-finals
- Europa League: 2nd qualifying round
- Top goalscorer: League: Jaka Štromajer (8); All: Jaka Štromajer (8)
- Highest home attendance: 2,700 (vs Olimpija)
- Lowest home attendance: 200 (vs Krka and Domžale)
- Average home league attendance: 758
Home colours	Away colours	Third colours
- All statistics correct as of 8 June 2016.

The 2015–16 season was Koper's 22nd season in the Slovenian PrvaLiga, Slovenian top division, since the league was created. Koper competed in the PrvaLiga, Cup and Europa League. The season for the club began on 2 July 2015 and ended on 21 May 2016.

== Players ==
As of 1 March 2016

Note: Flags indicate national team as defined under FIFA eligibility rules; some limited exceptions apply. Players may hold more than one non-FIFA nationality.

No.	Pos.	Nation	Player
2	DF	SLO	Jan Andrejašič
3	DF	BRA	Jefthon
4	DF	CRO	Toni Datković
5	DF	FRA	David Situ
6	MF	CRO	Jakov Biljan
7	MF	ESP	Ruben Belima
8	MF	SLO	Leo Štulac
9	FW	BIH	Zlatan Muslimović
10	MF	ESP	Joel Valencia
11	MF	ESP	Albert Riera
12	GK	SLO	David Adam
14	MF	SRB	Boris Živanović
17	MF	SLO	Dalibor Radujko
19	MF	CRO	Luka Leko

No.	Pos.	Nation	Player
20	FW	SUI	Fabian Lokaj
22	MF	SLO	Patrik Posavac
25	DF	CRO	Antonio Pavić
26	DF	ALB	Hysen Memolla
28	MF	SLO	Haris Dedić
30	FW	SLO	Jaka Štromajer
32	DF	CRO	Ivor Horvat
35	GK	CRO	Vjekoslav Tomić
39	MF	CRO	Ivan Blatančić
44	DF	CRO	Luka Batur
79	FW	MLI	Mademba Djibril Cisse
87	GK	CRO	Kristijan Kahlina
88	MF	ESP	Jonathan Ñiguez
99	FW	CRO	Marin Jurina

Source:FC Koper

== Competitions ==
=== Overall ===
Competition	Started round	Final position / round	First match	Last match
PrvaLiga	—	8th	19 July 2015	21 May 2016
Cup	Round of 16	Quarter-finals	15 September 2015	4 November 2015
Slovenian Supercup	Final	Winners	5 July 2015	5 July 2015
UEFA Europa League	First qualifying round	Second qualifying round	2 July 2015	23 July 2015

Updated to match played 25 May 2016
Source: Competitions

=== Overview ===
Competition	Record							
Competition	Pld	W	D	L	GF	GA	GD	Win %
PrvaLiga	36	11	7	18	40	54	−14	30.56
Supercup	1	0	1	0	0	0	+0	0.00
Cup	3	2	0	1	5	2	+3	66.67
Europa League	4	2	1	1	7	8	−1	50.00
Total	44	15	9	20	52	64	−12	34.09

Last updated: 25 May 2016
Source: Competitions

=== Supercup ===
5 July 2015 Final	Koper	0 – 0 (3 – 2 p)	Maribor	Koper, Slovenia
20:00 CET (UTC+01:00)	Galešić (yellow card) 23'; Krivičić (yellow card) 72'	Report (in Slovene)	N'Diaye (yellow card) 23'; Kabha (yellow card) 57'; Mertelj (yellow card) 69'; Stojanović (yellow card) 82'	Stadium: Bonifika Stadium; Attendance: 2,200; Referee: Dejan Balažič
	Penalties
	Hadžić (penalty scored); Lotrič (penalty missed); Črnigoj (penalty scored); Krivičić (penalty missed); Galešić (penalty missed); Palčič (penalty scored)		(penalty scored) Volaš; (penalty scored) Tavares; (penalty missed) Vršič; (penalty missed) Ibraimi; (penalty missed) Mertelj; (penalty missed) Rajčević

=== PrvaLiga ===
==== League table ====
Pos	Team	Pld	W	D	L	GF	GA	GD	Pts	Qualification or relegation
6	Krško	36	10	11	15	24	48	−24	41 (Note: Krško ahead of Rudar Velenje on head-to-head record: Rudar–Krško 1–1, Krško–Rudar 0–0, Rudar–Krško 0–1, Krško–Rudar 1–1.)	
7	Rudar Velenje	36	11	8	17	34	52	−18	41	
8	Koper	36	11	7	18	40	54	−14	40 (Note: Koper ahead of Zavrč on head-to-head record: Zavrč–Koper 1–0, Koper–Zavrč 3–1, Zavrč–Koper 1–3, Koper–Zavrč 1–0.)	
9	Zavrč (R)	36	9	13	14	32	41	−9	40	Qualification for the relegation play-offs
10	Krka (R)	36	8	10	18	30	56	−26	34	Relegation to Slovenian Second League

Source: Slovenian PrvaLiga (in Slovene), Soccerway
Rules for classification: 1) Points; 2) Head-to-head points; 3) Head-to-head goal difference; 4) Head-to-head goals scored; 5) Goal difference; 6) Goals scored.
(R) Relegated

==== Results summary ====
Overall								Home						Away					
Pld	W	D	L	GF	GA	GD	Pts	W	D	L	GF	GA	GD	W	D	L	GF	GA	GD
36	11	7	18	40	54	−14	40	4	4	10	21	29	−8	7	3	8	19	25	−6

Last updated: 25 May 2016.
Source: Competitive matches

==== Results by round ====
Round	1	2	3	4	5	6	7	8	9	10	11	12	13	14	15	16	17	18	19	20	21	22	23	24	25	26	27	28	29	30	31	32	33	34	35	36
Ground	H	A	H	H	A	H	A	H	A	A	H	A	A	H	A	H	A	H	H	A	H	H	A	H	A	H	A	A	H	A	A	H	A	H	A	H
Result	L	L	D	W	L	D	W	L	L	L	W	D	L	L	L	D	W	W	L	W	L	L	L	L	W	D	W	D	L	L	D	L	W	L	W	W
Position	7	9	9	8	9	10	5	7	8	9	8	8	8	8	8	8	8	6	6	6	6	7	8	9	8	8	8	8	9	9	9	9	9	9	9	8

Updated to match(es) played on 25 May 2016. Source: Competitive matches
A = Away; H = Home; W = Win; D = Draw; L = Loss

==== Matches ====
Win Draw Loss

19 July 2015 1	Koper	2 – 3	Domžale	Koper
20:15 CEST (UTC+02:00)	Rahmanović (yellow card) 19', (goal) 66'; Mršić (yellow card) 23' (yellow-red card) 41'; Štromajer (yellow card) 38', (goal) 64'; Štulac (yellow card) 45'; Radujko (yellow card) 90+3'; Ivančić (yellow card) 90+3'	Report (in Slovene)	Horvat (yellow card) 20'; Majer 28'; Skubic 35'; Juninho 53', (yellow card) 89'; Zec (yellow card) 76'	Stadium: Bonifika Stadium; Attendance: 450; Referee: Dragoslav Perić

26 July 2015 2	Krško	1 – 0	Koper	Krško
18:30 CEST (UTC+02:00)	Štefanac (yellow card) 27'; Poljanec 32'	Report (in Slovene)	Rahmanović (yellow card) 35'; Galešić (yellow card) 36'; Štromajer (yellow card) 90+2'	Stadium: Matija Gubec Stadium; Attendance: 1,700; Referee: Slavko Vinčić

2 August 2015 3	Koper	1 – 1	Celje	Koper
20:15 CEST (UTC+02:00)	Guberac (yellow card) 10'; Halilović 11'; Rahmanović (yellow card) 26'; Šme (red card) 78'	Report (in Slovene)	Firer 25'; Ahmedi (yellow card) 46'; Soria Alonso (yellow card) 63'; Travner (yellow card) 77'	Stadium: Bonifika Stadium; Attendance: 400; Referee: Asmir Sagrković

7 August 2015 4	Koper	2 – 1	Maribor	Koper
20:15 CEST (UTC+02:00)	Štromajer 49'; Guberac (yellow card) 71'; Galešić 86'; Simčič (yellow card) 90+2'	Report (in Slovene)	Bajde (yellow card) 36'; Vršič 47'; Viler (yellow card) 48'; Kabha (yellow card) 74'	Stadium: Bonifika Stadium; Attendance: 800; Referee: Dejan Balažič

12 August 2015 5	Olimpija	4 – 1	Koper	Ljubljana
17:30 CEST (UTC+02:00)	Djermanović (yellow card) 14', (goal) 25'; Kronaveter 40'; Henty 50', 73'	Report (in Slovene)	Rahmanović (yellow card) 11', (goal) 32'; Guberac (yellow card) 35'; Ivančić (yellow card) 45'	Stadium: Stožice Stadium; Attendance: 1,500; Referee: Bojan Mertik

15 August 2015 6	Koper	1 – 1	Rudar	Koper
20:15 CEST (UTC+02:00)	Palčič 47'; Šimurina (yellow card) 55'; Guberac (yellow card) 63'; Štromajer (yellow card) 90'	Report (in Slovene)	Kašnik 20', (yellow card) 70'; Bolha (yellow card) 42'; Tolimir (yellow card) 52'; Matic Žitko (yellow card) 90+7'	Stadium: Bonifika Stadium; Attendance: 400; Referee: Mitja Žganec

23 August 2015 7	Krka	2 – 4	Koper	Novo Mesto
17:00 CEST (UTC+02:00)	Ejup (yellow card) 16'; Kastrevec (yellow card) 39'; Fuček 70', 79' (pen.)	Report (in Slovene)	Hadžić (yellow card) 26' (yellow-red card) 78'; Črnigoj (yellow card) 43'; Šme (yellow card) 55'; Štromajer 63', 82'; Halilović 75'; Ivančić 90+1'	Stadium: Portoval; Attendance: 500; Referee: Rade Obrenović

29 August 2015 8	Koper	1 – 3	Gorica	Koper
20:15 CEST (UTC+02:00)	Simčič; Rahmanović (yellow card) 33'; Šme (yellow card) 72'; Ivančić (yellow card) 87'	Report (in Slovene)	Humar (yellow card) 22'; Burgić (yellow card) 27', (goal) 61'; Eleke 32', 84', (yellow card) 74'; Džuzdanović (yellow card) 72'	Stadium: Bonifika Stadium; Attendance: 900; Referee: Slavko Vinčić

11 September 2015 9	Zavrč	1 – 0	Koper	Zavrč
20:15 CEST (UTC+02:00)	Zorko 4'; Datković (yellow card) 36'; Rogač (yellow card) 67'; Batrović (yellow card) 73'; Kokorović (yellow card) 90'; Muslimović (yellow card) 90+3'	Report (in Slovene)	Tomas del Toro (yellow card) 56'; Ivančić (yellow card) 69'; Galešić (yellow card) 79'	Stadium: Zavrč Sports Park; Attendance: 350; Referee: Dragoslav Perić

20 September 2015 10	Domžale	1 – 0	Koper	Domžale
17:45 CEST (UTC+02:00)	Skubic (yellow card) 10'; Horić (yellow card) 21'; Črnic 43'; Morel (yellow card) 52'	Report (in Slovene)	Tomić (yellow card) 44'	Stadium: Domžale Sports Park; Attendance: 850; Referee: Slavko Vinčić

23 September 2015 11	Koper	4 – 0	Krško	Koper
20:00 CEST (UTC+02:00)	Ivančić 10', (yellow card) 31'; Tomas Del Toro (yellow card) 50'; Rahmanović 55' (pen.); Štulac 79'; Vekić 90+3'; Radujko (yellow card) 30+3'	Report (in Slovene)	Jakolić (yellow card) 36'; Perković (yellow card) 89'	Stadium: Bonifika Stadium; Attendance: 300; Referee: Rade Obrenović

26 September 2015 12	Celje	1 – 1	Koper	Celje
16:00 CEST (UTC+02:00)	Vrhovec (yellow card) 52'; Krajcer (yellow card) 61'; Đurković 90+3', (yellow card) 90+3'	Report (in Slovene)	Štulac 33'; Halilović (yellow card) 38'; Rahmanović (yellow card) 42'	Stadium: Arena Petrol; Attendance: 650; Referee: Roman Glažar

3 October 2015 13	Mribor	4 – 0	Koper	Maribor
17:45 CEST (UTC+02:00)	Vršič 39', (yellow card) 58'; Tavares 59', 76'; Ibraimi 61'; Kabha (yellow card) 71'	Report (in Slovene)	Ivančić (yellow card) 45'; Štulac (yellow card) 55'	Stadium: Ljudski vrt Attendance: 3,500; Referee: Nejc Kajtazović

18 October 2015 14	Koper	1 – 2	Olimpija	Koper
17:45 CEST (UTC+02:00)	Rahmanović (yellow card) 8'; Galešić (yellow card) 34'; Ivančić 46'; Šme (yellow card) 61'	Report (in Slovene)	Henty 19', 62'; Fink (yellow card) 26' (yellow-red card) 90+4'; Baskera (yellow card) 90+5'	Stadium: Bonifika Stadium; Attendance: 1,600; Referee: Miran Bukovec

24 October 2015 15	Rudar	1 – 0	Koper	Velenje
17:00 CET (UTC+01:00)	Kocić (yellow card) 44'; Žitko (yellow card) 81'; Džinić 87'; Radan (yellow card) 90+3'	Report (in Slovene)	Šme (yellow card) 39'; Tomić (yellow card) 65'; Guberac (yellow card) 78'; Lotrič (yellow card) 81'; Ivančić (yellow card) 85'	Stadium: Ob Jezeru City Stadium; Attendance: 750; Referee: Dejan Balažič

31 October 2015 16	Koper	0 – 0	Krka	Koper
20:00 CET (UTC+01:00)	Pavić (yellow card) 4'; Hadžić (yellow card) 16'; Rahmanović (yellow card) 75'	Report (in Slovene)	Perić (yellow card) 14'; Mojstrović (yellow card) 36'; Marotti (yellow card) 73'	Stadium: Bonifika Stadium; Attendance: 200; Referee: Mitja Žganec

8 November 2015 17	Gorica	1 – 2	Koper	Nova Gorica
17:45 CET (UTC+01:00)	Eleke 25'; Celcer (yellow card) 62'	Report (in Slovene)	Memolla 19', (yellow card) 88'; Pavić (yellow card) 66'; Šimurina (yellow card) 79'; Štromajer 90+2'	Stadium: Nova Gorica Sports Park; Attendance: 550; Referee: Dragoslav Perić

21 November 2015 18	Koper	3 – 1	Zavrč	Koper
16:00 CET (UTC+01:00)	Vekić 4'; Pavić (yellow card) 25'; Andrejašič (yellow card) 27'; S.Dedić (yellow card) 58'; Štulac 59', 82'; Radujko (yellow card) 62'; Hadžić (yellow card) 89'	Report (in Slovene)	Riera (yellow card) 38'; Golubar 67'; Datković (yellow card) 68'; Petrović (yellow card) 88'	Stadium: Bonifika Stadium; Attendance: 300; Referee: Miran Bukovec

28 November 2015 19	Koper	0 – 2	Domžale	Koper
20:00 CET (UTC+01:00)	Vekić (yellow card) 69'	Report (in Slovene)	Požeg 3'; Horić (yellow card) 7'; Morel 39'; Balkovec (yellow card) 72'	Stadium: Bonifika Stadium; Attendance: 200; Referee: Matej Jug

2 December 2015 20	Krško	0 – 1	Koper	Krško
16:00 CET (UTC+01:00)	Volarič (yellow card) 41'	Report (in Slovene)	Štromajer 4'; Gal (yellow card) 5'; Anđelković (yellow card) 43'; Kahlina (yellow card) 88'	Stadium: Matija Gubec Stadium; Attendance: 600; Referee: Vojko Goričan

5 December 2015 21	Koper	1 – 2	Celje	Koper
20:00 CET (UTC+01:00)	Memolla 39'; Posavac (yellow card) 63' (yellow-red card)	Report (in Slovene)	Đurković (yellow card) 6'; Osman Ali (yellow card) 13'; Kous (red card) 38'; Travner (yellow card) 63'; Spremo 69'; Omoregie 72'; Ramón Soria (yellow card) 78'	Stadium: Bonifika Stadium; Attendance: 300; Referee: Slavko Vinčić

13 December 2015 22	Koper	0 – 5	Maribor	Koper
17:30 CET (UTC+01:00)		Report (in Slovene)	Bajde 16'; Ibraimi 31', 43'; Sallalich 34'; Mendy 90'	Stadium: Bonifika Stadium; Attendance: 1,000; Referee: Dejan Balažič

28 February 2016 23	Olimpija	2 – 0	Koper	Ljubljana
16:55 CET (UTC+01:00)	Zajc 34' (yellow card) 76'; Radović 70'; Čale (yellow card) 74'	Report (in Slovene)	Štromajer (yellow card) 60'; Memolla (yellow card) 77'	Stadium: Stožice Stadium; Attendance: 2,500; Referee: Nejc Kajtazović

5 March 2016 24	Koper	0 – 1	Rudar	Koper
17:00 CET (UTC+01:00)	Štulac (yellow card) 87'	Report (in Slovene)	Bolha 23'; Kašnik (red card) 68'	Stadium: Bonifika Stadium; Attendance: 700; Referee: Miran Bukovec

13 March 2016 25	Krka	0 – 1	Koper	Novo Mesto
15:00 CET (UTC+01:00)	Perić (yellow card) 56'; Vučkić (yellow card) 58'; Bogdan (yellow card) 62'; Ejup (yellow card) 90+3'; Fuček (yellow card) 90+4'	Report (in Slovene)	Pavić (yellow card) 18'; Valencia (yellow card) 74'; Lokaj 78'; Tomić (yellow card) 80'	Stadium: Portoval; Attendance: 200; Referee: Slavko Vinčić

18 March 2016 26	Koper	1 – 1	Gorica	Koper
17:00 CET (UTC+01:00)	Biljan (yellow card) 14'; Jurina (yellow card) 43', (goal) 90+4'; Batur (yellow card) 44'	Report (in Slovene)	Celcer (yellow card) 34'; Burgič (yellow card) 44'; Gregorič 53'; Kapić (yellow card) 66'	Stadium: Bonifika Stadium; Attendance: 1,000; Referee: Nejc Kajtazović

3 April 2016 27	Zavrč	1 – 3	Koper	Zavrč
16:55 CEST (UTC+02:00)	Glavica (yellow card) 44'; Antić (yellow card) 47'; Tahiraj (yellow card) 65', (goal) 81'; Agboyi (yellow card) 70'	Report (in Slovene)	Datković 19', 26'; Belima (yellow card) 39', (goal) 59'; Pavić (yellow card) 46'; Jurina (yellow card) 57'; Batur (yellow card) 65' (yellow-red card) 76'	Stadium: Zavrč Sports Park; Attendance: 400; Referee: Matej Jug

6 April 2016 28	Domžale	1 – 1	Koper	Domžale
18:00 CEST (UTC+02:00)	Blažič (yellow card) 44'; Alvir (yellow card) 55'; Dobrovoljc 60'; Husmani (yellow card) 89'	Report (in Slovene)	Belima (yellow card) 43', (goal) 67'; Ñíguez (yellow card) 56'; Andrejašič (yellow card) 72'; Štualc (yellow card) 89'	Stadium: Domžale Sports Park; Attendance: 600; Referee: Slavko Vinčić

10 April 2016 29	Koper	0 – 1	Krško	Koper
19:00 CEST (UTC+02:00)	Jefthon (yellow card) 42'; Ñíguez (yellow card) 70'; Belima (yellow card) 78'; Jurina (yellow card) 83'; Lokaj (yellow card) 86'	Report (in Slovene)	Hotić 35'; Sikošek (yellow card) 39'; Pušaver (yellow card) 77'; Vuklišević (yellow card) 79'; Gregov (yellow card) 84'; Drnovšek (yellow card) 85'	Stadium: Bonifika Stadium; Attendance: 800; Referee: Mitja Žganec

16 April 2016 30	Celje	3 – 0	Koper	Celje
15:00 CEST (UTC+02:00)	Podlogar 36'; Omoregie 40'; Vrhovec (yellow card) 71'; Pišek 81'	Report (in Slovene)	Jurina (yellow card) 22' (yellow-red card) 27'	Stadium: Arena Petrol; Attendance: 920; Referee: Roman Glažar

24 April 2016 31	Maribor	2 – 2	Koper	Maribor
16:55 CEST	Janković (yellow card) 26'; Novaković 41' (pen.), 87'	Report (in Slovene)	Štromajer (yellow card) 33', (goal) 71'; Andrejašič 76', (yellow card) 76'; Tomić (yellow card) 78'; Radujko (yellow card) 90+1'	Stadium: Ljudski vrt Attendance: 5,000; Referee: Miran Bukovec

1 May 2016 32	Koper	1 – 2	Olimpija	Koper
17:00 CEST (UTC+02:00)	Andrejašič (yellow card) 15'; Štromajer 36'	Report (in Slovene)	Wobay 54'; Klinar 67', (yellow card) 88'; Vidmar (yellow card) 89'	Stadium: Bonifika Stadium; Attendance: 2,700; Referee: Andrej Žnidaršič

7 May 2016 33	Rudar	0 – 2	Koper	Velenje
17:00 CEST (UTC+02:00)	Jahić (yellow card) 60'	Report (in Slovene)	Valencia 10'; Štulac 36'; Radujko (yellow card) 82'; Jefthon (yellow card) 90+3'	Stadium: Ob Jezeru City Stadium; Attendance: 600; Referee: Dejan Balažič

11 May 2016 34	Koper	2 – 3	Krka	Koper
19:00 CEST (UTC+02:00)	Datković 45'; Jurina 57', (red card) 90+5'; Jefthon (yellow card) 76'; Batur (yellow card) 90+3'	Report (in Slovene)	Majcen 29', 51'; Boccaccini 77'; Mojstrović (yellow card) 90+5'	Stadium: Bonifika Stadium; Attendance: 600; Referee: Matej Jug

14 May 2016 35	Gorica	0 – 1	Koper	Nova Gorica
16:55 CEST (UTC+02:00)	Boben (yellow card) 44'	Report (in Slovene)	Horvat 34'; Biljan (yellow card) 79'; Tomić (yellow card) 90+4'	Stadium: Nova Gorica Sports Park; Attendance: 600; Referee: Bojan Mertik

21 May 2016 36	Koper	1 – 0	Zavrč	Koper
16:55 CEST (UTC+02:00)	Datković (yellow card) 33'; Štulac 38'; Biljan (yellow card) 72'; Štromajer (yellow card) 77'; Tomić (yellow card) 82'	Report (in Slovene)	Jakšić (yellow card) 24' (yellow-red card) 37'; Antić (yellow card) 37'; Karamatić (yellow card) 45'; Agboyi (yellow card) 77'	Stadium: Bonifika Stadium; Attendance: 700; Referee: Dejan Balažič

=== Cup ===
==== Round of 16 ====
15 September 2015 Round of 16	Zarica	0 – 3	Koper	Kranj
16:00 CEST	Križaj (yellow card) 22'; Frelih (yellow card) 38'; Kotnik (yellow card) 69'	Report (in Slovene)	Rahmanović (yellow card) 5', (goal) 48'; Andrejašič (yellow card) 70'; Posavac 78', 84'	Stadium: Zarica Sports Park; Attendance: 200; Referee: Dejan Balažič

==== Quarter-finals ====
28 October 2015 First leg	Domžale	0 – 1	Koper	Domžale
18:00 CEST	Husmani (yellow card) 37'; Horvat (yellow card) 57'	Report (in Slovene)	Memolla (yellow card) 19'; Galešić (yellow card) 33'; Guberac (yellow card) 55'; Štromajer (yellow card) 84'; Rahmanović 89'	Stadium: Domžale Sports Park; Attendance: 650; Referee: Davor Drečnik

4 November 2015 Second leg	Koper	1 – 2 (2 – 2 (a.) agg.)	Domžale	Koper
18:00 CET	Ivančić 47'; Lotrič (yellow card) 60'; Guberac (yellow card) 72'; Kahlina (yellow card) 90'	Report (in Slovene)	Črnic 3'; Morel (yellow card) 66', (goal) 90+2'; Horić (yellow card) 70'; Skubic (yellow card) 72'; Majer (yellow card) 79'	Stadium: Bonifika; Attendance: 250; Referee: Nejc Kajtazović

=== UEFA Europa League ===
==== First qualifying round ====
2 July 2015 First leg	Víkingur Reykjavík (Iceland)	0 – 1	(Slovenia) Koper	Reykjavík
21:15	Tasković (yellow card) 60'; Kristinsson (yellow card) 71'	Report	Pučko 77'	Stadium: Víkingsvöllur; Attendance: 1,010; Referee: Andrew Dallas (Scotland)

9 July 2015 Second leg	Koper (Slovenia)	2 – 2 (3 – 2 agg.)	(Iceland) Víkingur Reykjavík	Koper
20:30	Ivančić (yellow card) 6'; Pučko 18'; Palčič 61'	Report	Snorrason (yellow card) 13'; Tasković (yellow card) 16'; Gudmundsson (yellow card) 19'; Kristinsson 51', 76'; Toft (yellow card) 86'	Stadium: Bonifika Stadium; Attendance: 1,500; Referee: István Kovács (Romania)

==== Second qualifying round ====
16 July 2015 First leg	Koper (Slovenia)	3 – 2	(Croatia) Hajduk Split	Koper
19:00	Halilović 7'; Rahmanović 17', 41', (yellow card) 55'; Pučko (yellow card) 79'; Šme (yellow card) 90+1'	Report	Roguljić (yellow card) 27'; Milović 29'; Balić (yellow card) 45'; Nižić 90'	Stadium: Bonifika Stadium; Attendance: 2,592; Referee: Bartosz Frankowski (Poland)

23 July 2015 Second leg	Hajduk Split (Croatia)	4 – 1 (6 – 4 agg.)	(Slovenia) Koper	Split
19:00	Kiš 2'; Nižić (yellow card) 12'; Jefferson 40', (yellow card) 67'; Kiš (yellow card) 55'; Caktaš 62'; Maglica 69'	Report	Tomić (yellow card) 42'; Palčič 45+2'; Šme (yellow card) 59'; Halilović (yellow card) 80'; Ivančić (yellow card) 89'	Stadium: Stadion Poljud; Attendance: 22,800; Referee: Marco Fritz (Germany)

== Statistics ==
=== Squad statistics ===
As of matches played 21 May 2016.

No.	Pos.	Player	Total				PrvaLiga				Cup				Supercup				Europa League			
No.	Pos.	Player		Goal	Yellow card	Red card		Goal	Yellow card	Red card		Goal	Yellow card	Red card		Goal	Yellow card	Red card		Goal	Yellow card	Red card
2	DF	(Slovenia) Jan Andrejašič	26	1	5	0	23	1	4	0	3	0	1	0	0	0	0	0	0	0	0	0
3	DF	(Brazil) Jefton	7	0	3	0	7	0	3	0	0	0	0	0	0	0	0	0	0	0	0	0
4	DF	(Croatia) Toni Datković	14	3	1	0	14	3	1	0	0	0	0	0	0	0	0	0	0	0	0	0
5	DF	(France) Davi Situ	3	0	0	0	3	0	0	0	0	0	0	0	0	0	0	0	0	0	0	0
6	MF	(Croatia) Jakov Biljan	7	0	3	0	7	0	3	0	0	0	0	0	0	0	0	0	0	0	0	0
7	MF	(Spain) Rubén Belima	10	2	3	0	10	2	3	0	0	0	0	0	0	0	0	0	0	0	0	0
8	MF	(Slovenia) Leo Štulac	32	6	4	0	29	6	4	0	3	0	0	0	0	0	0	0	0	0	0	0
9	MF	(Bosnia and Herzegovina) Zlatan Muslimović	8	0	0	0	8	0	0	0	0	0	0	0	0	0	0	0	0	0	0	0
10	FW	(Spain) Joel Valencia	13	1	1	0	13	1	1	0	0	0	0	0	0	0	0	0	0	0	0	0
11	FW	(Spain) Albert Riera	1	0	0	0	1	0	0	0	0	0	0	0	0	0	0	0	0	0	0	0
12	MF	(Slovenia) David Adam	0	0	0	0	0	0	0	0	0	0	0	0	0	0	0	0	0	0	0	0
14	GK	(Hungary) Boris Zsivanovics	4	0	0	0	4	0	0	0	0	0	0	0	0	0	0	0	0	0	0	0
17	MF	(Slovenia) Dalibor Radujko	21	0	5	0	19	0	5	0	0	0	0	0	1	0	0	0	1	0	0	0
19	MF	(Croatia) Luka Leko	3	0	0	0	3	0	0	0	0	0	0	0	0	0	0	0	0	0	0	0
20	MF	(Switzerland) Fabian Lokaj	9	1	1	0	9	1	1	0	0	0	0	0	0	0	0	0	0	0	0	0
22	FW	(Slovenia) Patrik Posavac	21	2	1	1	18	0	1	1	3	2	0	0	0	0	0	0	0	0	0	0
25	MF	(Croatia) Antonio Pavić	26	0	5	0	23	0	5	0	3	0	0	0	0	0	0	0	0	0	0	0
26	DF	(Albania) Hysen Memolla	20	2	3	0	17	2	2	0	3	0	1	0	0	0	0	0	0	0	0	0
28	MF	(Slovenia) Haris Dedić	7	0	0	0	7	0	0	0	0	0	0	0	0	0	0	0	0	0	0	0
30	FW	(Slovenia) Jaka Štromajer	39	8	7	0	34	8	6	0	3	0	1	0	0	0	0	0	2	0	0	0
32	DF	(Croatia) Ivor Horvat	11	1	0	0	11	1	0	0	0	0	0	0	0	0	0	0	0	0	0	0
35	GK	(Croatia) Vjekoslav Tomić	12	0	4	0	12	0	4	0	0	0	0	0	0	0	0	0	0	0	0	0
39	MF	(Croatia) Ivan Blatančić	2	0	0	0	2	0	0	0	0	0	0	0	0	0	0	0	0	0	0	0
44	CRO	(Croatia) Luka Batur	10	0	3	1	10	0	3	1	0	0	0	0	0	0	0	0	0	0	0	0
79	FW	(Mali) Mademba Djibril Cisse	2	0	0	0	2	0	0	0	0	0	0	0	0	0	0	0	0	0	0	0
87	GK	(Croatia) Kristijan Kahlina	14	0	2	0	11	0	1	0	3	0	1	0	0	0	0	0	0	0	0	0
88	MF	(Spain) Jonathan Ñiguez	5	0	2	0	5	0	2	0	0	0	0	0	0	0	0	0	0	0	0	0
99	FW	(Croatia) Marin Jurina	10	2	4	2	10	2	4	2	0	0	0	0	0	0	0	0	0	0	0	0
U19	FW	(Slovenia) Žiga Kljun	2	0	0	0	2	0	0	0	0	0	0	0	0	0	0	0	0	0	0	0
U19	DF	(Slovenia) Aleksander Maslić	2	0	0	0	2	0	0	0	0	0	0	0	0	0	0	0	0	0	0	0
U19	MF	(Slovenia) Rok Požrl	2	0	0	0	2	0	0	0	0	0	0	0	0	0	0	0	0	0	0	0
Players who left the club in Summer/Winter transfer window or on loan
–	MF	(Slovenia) Nik Mršič	1	0	1	1	1	0	1	1	0	0	0	0	0	0	0	0	0	0	0	0
–	MF	(Slovenia) Domen Črnigoj	12	0	1	0	7	0	1	0	0	0	0	0	1	0	0	0	4	0	0	0
–	MF	(The Gambia) Tijan Jaiteh	2	0	0	0	2	0	0	0	0	0	0	0	0	0	0	0	0	0	0	0
–	GK	(Slovenia) Vasja Simčič	18	0	2	0	13	0	2	0	0	0	0	0	1	0	0	0	4	0	0	0
–	MF	(Croatia) Drago Gabrić	5	0	0	0	5	0	0	0	0	0	0	0	0	0	0	0	0	0	0	0
–	MF	(Slovenia) Matej Pučko	7	2	1	0	3	0	0	0	0	0	0	0	1	0	0	0	3	2	1	0
–	MF	(Croatia) Mislav Anđelković	5	0	1	0	5	0	1	0	0	0	0	0	0	0	0	0	0	0	0	0
–	MF	(Slovenia) Matej Palčič	9	3	0	0	4	1	0	0	0	0	0	0	1	0	0	0	4	2	0	0
–	MF	(Croatia) Ante Tomić	18	0	3	0	14	0	2	0	1	0	0	0	0	0	0	0	3	0	1	0
–	DF	(Slovenia) Damir Hadžić	23	0	3	1	15	0	3	1	3	0	0	0	1	0	0	0	4	0	0	0
–	DF	(Croatia) Ivan Šimurina	4	0	2	0	3	0	2	0	1	0	0	0	0	0	0	0	0	0	0	0
–	MF	(Slovenia) Marko Krivičić	10	0	1	0	7	0	0	0	0	0	0	0	1	0	1	0	2	0	0	0
–	DF	(Slovenia) Denis Halilović	13	3	2	0	9	2	1	0	0	0	0	0	1	0	0	0	3	1	1	0
–	MF	(Slovenia) Davor Škerjanc	6	0	0	0	5	0	0	0	1	0	0	0	0	0	0	0	0	0	0	0
–	MF	(Bosnia and Herzegovina) Goran Galešić	13	1	5	0	7	1	3	0	1	0	1	0	1	0	1	0	4	0	0	0
–	FW	(Slovenia) Luka Vekić	13	2	1	0	10	2	1	0	2	0	0	0	0	0	0	0	1	0	0	0
–	FW	(Slovenia) Mitja Lotrič	10	0	3	0	7	0	2	0	1	0	1	0	1	0	0	0	1	0	0	0
–	MF	(Croatia) Josip Ivančić	22	5	8	0	14	4	6	0	3	1	0	0	1	0	0	0	4	0	2	0
–	MF	(Bosnia and Herzegovina) Amar Rahmanović	20	7	10	0	15	3	8	0	2	2	1	0	0	0	0	0	3	2	1	0
–	MF	(Slovenia) Ivica Guberac	16	0	7	0	9	0	5	0	2	0	2	0	1	0	0	0	4	0	0	0
–	DF	(Spain) Cristian Tomas Del Toro	6	0	2	0	5	0	2	0	1	0	0	0	0	0	0	0	0	0	0	0
–	DF	(Croatia) Igor Gal	3	0	1	0	3	0	1	0	0	0	0	0	0	0	0	0	0	0	0	0
–	DF	(Croatia) Sven Dedić	5	0	1	0	5	0	1	0	0	0	0	0	0	0	0	0	0	0	0	0
–	DF	(Slovenia) Denis Šme	20	0	6	1	12	0	4	1	3	0	0	0	1	0	0	0	4	0	2	0
Own goals			–	0	–	–	–	0	–	–	–	0	–	–	–	0	–	–	–	0	–	–
TOTALS			–	52	118	7	–	40	99	7	–	5	9	0	–	0	2	0	7	8	0	0

=== Goalscorers ===
As of matches played 21 May 2016.

Rank	No.	Pos.	Player	PrvaLiga	Cup	Supercup	Europa League	Total
1	30	FW	(Slovenia) Jaka Štromajer	8	0	0	0	8
2	–	MF	(Bosnia and Herzegovina) Amar Rahmanović	3	3	0	2	7
3	8	MF	(Slovenia) Leo Štulac	6	0	0	0	6
4	–	MF	(Croatia) Josip Ivančić	4	1	0	0	5
5	4	DF	(Croatia) Toni Datković	3	0	0	0	3
5	–	MF	(Slovenia) Matej Palčič	1	0	0	2	3
5	–	DF	(Slovenia) Denis Halilović	2	0	0	1	3
8	7	MF	(Spain) Rubén Belima	2	0	0	0	2
8	26	DF	(Albania) Hysen Memolla	2	0	0	0	2
8	99	FW	(Croatia) Marin Jurina	2	0	0	0	2
8	–	FW	(Slovenia) Luka Vekić	2	0	0	0	2
8	22	FW	(Slovenia) Patrik Posavac	0	2	0	0	2
8	–	MF	(Slovenia) Matej Pučko	0	0	0	2	2
14	–	MF	(Bosnia and Herzegovina) Goran Galešić	1	0	0	0	1
14	32	DF	(Croatia) Ivor Horvat	1	0	0	0	1
14	20	MF	(Switzerland) Fabian Lokaj	1	0	0	0	1
14	10	FW	(Spain) Joel Valencia	1	0	0	0	1
14	2	DF	(Slovenia) Jan Andrejašič	1	0	0	0	1
Own goals				0	0	0	0	0
TOTALS				40	5	0	7	52

== See also ==
- 2015–16 Slovenian PrvaLiga
- 2015–16 Slovenian Football Cup
- 2015 Slovenian Supercup
- 2015–16 UEFA Europa League
