= 2015 Slovenian Football Cup final =

- Event: 2014–15 Slovenian Football Cup
Koper	Celje
2	0
- Date: 20 May 2015
- Venue: Bonifika Stadium, Koper
- Referee: Slavko Vinčić
- Attendance: 3,000

The 2015 Slovenian Football Cup final was the final match of the 2014–15 Slovenian Football Cup to decide the winner of the 24th edition of the Slovenian Football Cup, Slovenia's top knockout tournament. The match was played at Bonifika Stadium in Koper on 20 May 2015 and was won by Koper, who defeated Celje with the score 2–0. This was the third cup title for Koper.

== Background ==
The final was played between Koper and Celje, both competing in the Slovenian PrvaLiga. This was the second time that Koper and Celje met in the cup final, having faced each other in the final during the 2005–06 cup edition, where Koper won their first cup title after the penalty shootout. Celje previously competed in seven finals, but managed to win only once, when they defeated Gorica in the 2004–05 cup edition.

== Road to the final ==
Note: In all results below, the score of the finalist is given first.

Koper				Round	Celje			
Opponent	Result			Knockout phase	Opponent	Result		
N/A	N/A			First round	Dob	6–1 (A)		
Tabor Sežana	1–0 (A)			Round of 16	Zarica Kranj	2–1 (A)		
Opponent	Agg.	1st leg	2nd leg	Knockout phase	Opponent	Agg.	1st leg	2nd leg
Gorica	5–4	1–3 (A)	4–1 (H) (a.e.t.)	Quarter-finals	Zavrč	5–3	3–2 (A)	2–1 (H)
Domžale	2–1	1–0 (H)	1–1 (A)	Semi-finals	Maribor	3–2	3–2 (A)	0–0 (H)

== Match details ==
20 May 2015
20:30 CEST

Koper	2–0	Celje
Halilović 6'; Štromajer 87'	Report

Bonifika, Koper
Attendance: 3,000
Referee: Slavko Vinčić

Koper	Celje

GK	83	(Slovenia) Vasja Simčič	(yellow card) 83'
DF	16	(Slovenia) Denis Halilović	(yellow card) 79'
DF	27	(Slovenia) Damir Hadžić	(yellow card) 48'
DF	29	(Slovenia) Matej Palčič	(yellow card) 60' (yellow-red card) 85'
MF	28	(Bosnia and Herzegovina) Amar Rahmanović	(substituted off) 84'
MF	10	(Slovenia) Marko Krivičić	(yellow card) 63'
DF	70	(Slovenia) Denis Šme
MF	20	(Slovenia) Domen Črnigoj	(yellow card) 13'
MF	7	(Slovenia) Ivica Guberac	(yellow card) 27'
MF	14	(Bosnia and Herzegovina) Goran Galešić	(substituted off) 88'
FW	10	(Slovenia) Mitja Lotrič	(substituted off) 65'
Substitutes:
GK	1	(Slovenia) Ermin Hasić
DF	5	(Slovenia) Miha Blažič
MF	99	(North Macedonia) Dejan Peševski
DF	3	(Slovenia) Miha Gregorič	(substituted in) 88'
FW	49	(Slovenia) Matej Pučko	(substituted in) 65' (yellow card) 89'
MF	22	(Slovenia) Patrik Posavac
FW	30	(Slovenia) Jaka Štromajer	(substituted in) 84'
Manager:
(Italy) Rodolfo Vanoli

GK	1	(Bosnia and Herzegovina) Amel Mujčinović
DF	20	(Slovenia) Marko Jakolić
DF	6	(Slovenia) Tilen Klemenčič
DF	27	(Spain) Ramon Soria	(yellow card) 59'
MF	19	(Croatia) Danijel Miškić	(yellow card) 59'
MF	8	(Croatia) Igor Jugović	(yellow card) 69' (substituted off) 73'
MF	7	(Slovenia) Benjamin Verbič	(yellow card) 79'
DF	30	(Slovenia) Tadej Vidmajer
MF	13	(Slovenia) Jon Šporn	(substituted off) 46'
FW	9	(Slovenia) Gregor Bajde	(substituted off) 46'
FW	11	(Nigeria) Sunny Omoregie
Substitutes:
GK	31	(Slovenia) Metod Jurhar
DF	24	(Slovenia) Matic Žitko
MF	18	(Slovenia) Sebastjan Gobec
MF	25	(Japan) Yuto Kubo
FW	21	(Czech Republic) Jiri Jeslinek	(substituted in) 73'
FW	33	(Croatia) Ivan Lendrić	(substituted in) 46'
MF	10	(Albania) Valon Ahmedi	(substituted in) 46'
Manager:
(Slovenia) Simon Rožman

Assistant referees:
Tadej Friš
Uroš Benc
Fourth official:
Bojan Šinkovec
Delegate:
Alojz Kovačič

2014–15 Slovenian Cup
Winners
Koper
3rd title

== See also ==
- 2014–15 Slovenian Cup
- 2014–15 Slovenian PrvaLiga
- 2015 Slovenian Supercup
