= 2016–17 FC Koper season =

FC Koper
2016–17 season
- President: Valter Valenčič
- Head Coach: Milan Obradović
- Stadium: Bonifika Stadium
- Slovenian League: 8th
- Slovenian Cup: First round
- Average home league attendance: 786
Home colours	Away colours	Third colours

The 2016–17 season is Koper's 23rd season in the Slovenian PrvaLiga, Slovenian top division, since the league was created. Koper compete in Slovenian PrvaLiga and Slovenian Football Cup.

== Players ==
As of 17 July 2016

Note: Flags indicate national team as defined under FIFA eligibility rules; some limited exceptions apply. Players may hold more than one non-FIFA nationality.

No.	Pos.	Nation	Player
1	GK	CRO	Marijan Antolović
2	DF	SLO	Jan Andrejašič
3	DF	BRA	Jefthon
4	DF	CRO	Toni Datković
5	DF	FRA	Darnel Situ
6	MF	CRO	Jakov Biljan
7	MF	GEQ	Rubén Belima
9	FW	NED	Joël Tshibamba
10	MF	ECU	Joel Valencia
12	GK	SLO	David Adam
13	FW	BIH	Zlatan Muslimović
15	DF	SLO	Haris Dedić
17	MF	BIH	Senijad Ibričić
20	FW	SLO	Žan Bračko

No.	Pos.	Nation	Player
21	MF	SLO	Matej Pučko
22	MF	SLO	Patrik Posavac
23	MF	SLO	Marko Krivičič
25	MF	ARG	Leandro Nicolas Teijo
26	DF	CRO	Šime Gregov
30	FW	SLO	Jaka Štromajer
32	DF	CRO	Ivor Horvat
39	MF	CRO	Ivan Blatančić
45	DF	SLO	Matic Paljk
52	FW	SLO	Luka Vekić
83	GK	SLO	Vasja Simčič
88	FW	BIH	Adnan Ahmetović
94	DF	SLO	Gregor Sikošek
99	FW	BIH	Marin Jurina

Source:FC Koper

== Competitions ==
=== Overall ===
Competition	Started round	Final position / round	First match	Last match
PrvaLiga	Pre-season		16 July 2016	27 May 2017
Cup	First round		17 August 2016	

Source: Competitions

=== Overview ===
Competition	Record							
Competition	G	W	D	L	GF	GA	GD	Win %
PrvaLiga	0	0	0	0	0	0	+0	—
Cup	0	0	0	0	0	0	+0	—
Total	0	0	0	0	0	0	+0	—

Source: Competitions

=== PrvaLiga ===
==== League table ====
Pos	Team	Pld	W	D	L	GF	GA	GD	Pts	Qualification or relegation
4	Domžale	36	16	8	12	63	45	+18	56	Qualification for the Europa League first qualifying round (Note: Domžale qualified for Europa League first qualifying round by winning the 2016–17 Slovenian Football Cup.)
5	Celje	36	15	10	11	48	39	+9	55	
6	Koper (R)	36	12	14	10	43	40	+3	50	Relegation to fourth tier (Note: Koper did not get a competition licence and was thus relegated to the fourth division.)
7	Rudar Velenje	36	10	11	15	49	53	−4	41	
8	Krško	36	8	15	13	39	50	−11	39	

Source: PrvaLiga (in Slovene), Soccerway
Rules for classification: 1) Points; 2) Head-to-head points; 3) Head-to-head goal difference; 4) Head-to-head away goals scored; 5) Goal difference; 6) Goals scored; 7) Away goals scored; 8) Fairplay ranking; 9) Draw.
(R) Relegated

==== Results summary ====
Overall								Home						Away					
Pld	W	D	L	GF	GA	GD	Pts	W	D	L	GF	GA	GD	W	D	L	GF	GA	GD
0	0	0	0	0	0	0	0	0	0	0	0	0	0	0	0	0	0	0	0

Source: Competitive matches

==== Results by round ====
Round	1	2	3	4	5	6	7	8	9	10	11	12	13	14	15	16	17	18	19	20	21	22	23	24	25	26	27	28	29	30	31	32	33	34	35	36
Ground																																				
Result																																				
Position																																				

Source: Competitive matches
A = Away; H = Home; W = Win; D = Draw; L = Loss

==== Matches ====
Win Draw Loss Fixtures

1	v
--:-- CEST (UTC+02:00)	[Report (in Slovene)]

=== Cup ===
==== First round ====
Win Draw Loss Fixtures

17 August 2016 First round	Šmarje pri Jelšah	v	Koper
--:-- CEST (UTC+02:00)		[Report (in Slovene)]

== Statistics ==
=== Squad statistics ===
No.	Pos.	Player	Total			PrvaLiga			Cup		
No.	Pos.	Player	Goal	Yellow card	Red card	Goal	Yellow card	Red card	Goal	Yellow card	Red card

== See also ==
- 2016–17 Slovenian PrvaLiga
- 2016–17 Slovenian Football Cup
