= 2017–18 Slovenian Football Cup =

Tournament details
- Country: Slovenia
- Teams: 27

Final positions
- Champions: Olimpija Ljubljana (1st title)
- Runners-up: Aluminij

Tournament statistics
- Matches played: 32
- Goals scored: 108 (3.38 per match)
- Attendance: 30,174 (943 per match)
- Top goal scorer: Leon Benko (five goals)

The 2017–18 Slovenian Football Cup was the 27th edition of the Slovenian Football Cup, Slovenia's football knockout competition.

== Competition format ==
Round	Draw date	Fixtures	Clubs	Format details
First round	22 June 2017	12	24 → 12	18 clubs that have qualified through MNZ Regional Cups + 6 clubs from the 2016–17 PrvaLiga that didn't qualify for UEFA competitions entered at this stage and were drawn into 12 pairs. Teams that have qualified from the same regional cup could not be drawn against each other. The twelve winners were decided over one leg, with extra time and penalties if scores were level. Lower level teams were the hosts. If both teams from a pair were from the same level, the home team was determined by the draw.
Round of 16	18 August 2017	8	12+4 → 8	12 first round winners were joined by four 2016–17 PrvaLiga teams that qualified for UEFA competitions, and were drawn into 8 pairs. Teams that have qualified from the same regional cup could not be drawn against each other. The eight winners were decided over one leg, with extra time and penalties if scores were level. Lower level teams were the hosts. If both teams from a pair were from the same level, the home team was determined by the draw.
Quarter-finals	21 September 2017	4	8 → 4	8 teams were drawn into 4 pairs. The four winners were decided over two legs on home and away basis with away goals rule being used. In case of a tie, extra time and penalties were used.
Semi-finals	18 December 2017	2	4 → 2	4 teams were drawn into 2 pairs. The two winners were decided over two legs on home and away basis with away goals rule being used. In case of a tie, extra time and penalties were used.
Final	N/A	1	2 → 1	Winner was decided in a single game, played at Stožice Stadium in Ljubljana. Extra time and penalties would be used if the scores would be level. The winners should have qualified for the 2018–19 UEFA Europa League first qualifying round. However, since the cup winners, Olimpija Ljubljana, qualified for the 2018–19 UEFA Champions League as the Slovenian league champions, the spot from the cup was vacated and given to the fourth-placed team in the 2017–18 Slovenian PrvaLiga, Rudar Velenje.

== Qualified teams ==
=== 2016–17 Slovenian PrvaLiga members ===
- Aluminij
- Celje
- Domžale
- Gorica
- Koper
- Krško
- Maribor
- Olimpija
- Radomlje
- Rudar Velenje

=== Qualified through MNZ Regional Cups ===
- 2016–17 MNZ Celje Cup: Šampion and Šoštanj (withdrew)
- 2016–17 MNZ Koper Cup: Jadran Dekani and Tabor Sežana
- 2016–17 MNZG-Kranj Cup: Triglav Kranj and Zarica Kranj
- 2016–17 MNZ Lendava Cup: Hotiza and Nafta
- 2016–17 MNZ Ljubljana Cup: Krka and Ilirija
- 2016–17 MNZ Maribor Cup: Akumulator Mežica and Korotan Prevalje
- 2016–17 MNZ Murska Sobota Cup: Beltinci and Mura
- 2016–17 MNZ Nova Gorica Cup: Tolmin and Brda
- 2016–17 MNZ Ptuj Cup: Videm and Drava Ptuj

== First round ==
Šoštanj withdrew before the competition began; Triglav Kranj received a bye.

15 August 2017	Hotiza	1–2	Krka	Hotiza
16:00 CEST	Biro 61' (pen.)	Report	Kambič 46'; Wilson 55'	Stadium: Hotiza Sports Park; Attendance: 300; Referee: Dejan Vivod

15 August 2017	Beltinci	0–3	Aluminij	Beltinci
16:00 CEST		Report	Mesec 60', 88'; Nunić 79'	Stadium: Beltinci Sports Park; Attendance: 400; Referee: Bojan Tkalčič

15 August 2017	Šampion	0–0 (a.e.t.) (5–3 p)	Tolmin	Celje
16:00 CEST		Report		Stadium: Olimp; Attendance: 100; Referee: Blaž Kos
	Penalties
	Torra (penalty scored); Pirtovšek (penalty scored); Gojzdnik (penalty scored); Karabegovič (penalty scored); Korošec (penalty scored)		(penalty scored) Zornik; (penalty scored) Sokanović; (penalty scored) Dowlin

16 August 2017	Ilirija 1911	0–0 (a.e.t.) (0–3 p)	Krško	Ljubljana
16:00 CEST		Report		Stadium: Ilirija Sports Park; Attendance: 200; Referee: Marko Podgoršek
	Penalties
			(penalty scored) Škrbić; (penalty scored) Ejup; (penalty scored) Nakić

16 August 2017	Akumulator Mežica	1–4	Jadran Dekani	Mežica
16:00 CEST	Hutmajer 85'	Report	Rupnik 29'; Fortuna 59'; Petrovčič 79', 86'	Stadium: Mežica Field; Attendance: 100; Referee: Asmir Sagrković

16 August 2017	Videm	1–6	Radomlje	Videm pri Ptuju
16:00 CEST	Božak 85'	Report	Cerar 22'; Hajrić 55', 78'; Kovjenić 61'; Trdin 64'; Nuhanović 67'	Stadium: Videm Sports Park; Attendance: 200; Referee: David Šmajc

16 August 2017	Mura	5–2	Zarica Kranj	Murska Sobota
16:00 CEST	Karničnik 9'; Maroša 15' (pen.), 47', 59'; Bobičanec 68'	Report	Ahačič 2'; Žurga 62' (pen.)	Stadium: Fazanerija; Attendance: 450; Referee: Vojko Goričan

16 August 2017	Tabor Sežana	3–1	Rudar Velenje	Sežana
16:00 CEST	Duspara 19'; Sever 87'; Pavić 90+4'	Report	Radić 37'	Stadium: Rajko Štolfa; Attendance: 160; Referee: Andraž Stojanoski

16 August 2017	Drava Ptuj	2–1	Brda	Ptuj
16:00 CEST	Golob 26'; Marcius 45' (pen.)	Report	Ferjančič 90'	Stadium: Ptuj City Stadium; Attendance: 150; Referee: Alen Borošak

16 August 2017	Nafta 1903	1–2	Celje	Lendava
18:00 CEST	Osmanaj 84'	Report	Šušnjara 17'; Požeg Vančas 44'	Stadium: Lendava Sports Park; Attendance: 280; Referee: Marko Lacković

16 August 2017	Koper	3–0	Korotan Prevalje	Koper
18:00 CEST	Jerman 44'; Popovič 90'; Klarić 90+2'	Report		Stadium: Bonifika; Attendance: 450; Referee: Iztok Gornjak

== Round of 16 ==
5 September 2017	Tabor Sežana	0–3	Maribor	Sežana
16:00 CEST		Report	Rajčević 34'; Mešanović 78', 90'	Stadium: Rajko Štolfa Stadium; Attendance: 1,300; Referee: Roman Glažar

6 September 2017	Krka	3–2 (a.e.t.)	Krško	Novo Mesto
16:00 CEST	Slunjski 31'; Kambič 50', 119'	Report	Mujan 60'; Škrbić 83'	Stadium: Portoval; Attendance: 200; Referee: Damir Skomina

6 September 2017	Koper	1–4	Triglav Kranj	Koper
18:00 CEST	Tomić 7'	Report	Križaj 17'; Poplatnik 73'; Udovič 84'; Majcen 87'	Stadium: Bonifika; Attendance: 300; Referee: Alen Borošak

19 September 2017	Jadran Dekani	0–7	Aluminij	Dekani
16:00 CEST		Report	Krajnc 3'; Bartulovič 31', 68'; Muminović 34'; Škoflek 76', 90'; Podgoršek 87' (o.g.)	Stadium: Dekani Sports Park; Attendance: 60; Referee: Nejc Kajtazović

19 September 2017	Radomlje	1–6	Olimpija Ljubljana	Domžale
20:00 CEST	Hajrić 85'	Report	Boateng 24'; Benko 26', 32', 61'; Miškić 75'; Savić 89'	Stadium: Domžale Sports Park; Attendance: 200; Referee: Andrej Žnidaršič

20 September 2017	Drava Ptuj	0–3	Celje	Ptuj
13:00 CEST		Report	Križan 36', 42'; Lupeta 78'	Stadium: Ptuj City Stadium; Attendance: 300; Referee: Bojan Mertik

20 September 2017	Mura	3–1	Domžale	Murska Sobota
15:00 CEST	Bobičanec 33', 43'; Kous 38'	Report	Hebaj 15'	Stadium: Fazanerija; Attendance: 600; Referee: Slavko Vinčić

20 September 2017	Šampion	0–3	Gorica	Celje
16:00 CEST		Report	Marinič 74'; Edafe 84', 87'	Stadium: Olimp; Attendance: 150; Referee: Dragoslav Perić

== Quarter-finals ==
=== First leg ===
17 October 2017	Triglav Kranj	0–1	Gorica	Kranj
15:00 CEST		Report	Osuji 76'	Stadium: Stanko Mlakar Stadium; Attendance: 250; Referee: Darjan Kovačič

17 October 2017	Celje	4–0	Mura	Celje
17:15 CEST	Šušnjara 22', 47'; Dangubić 24', 50'	Report		Stadium: Stadion Z'dežele; Attendance: 500; Referee: Bojan Tkalčič

18 October 2017	Aluminij	0–0	Krka	Kidričevo
18:00 CEST		Report		Stadium: Aluminij Sports Park; Attendance: 100; Referee: Miran Bukovec

11 November 2017	Olimpija Ljubljana	3–0	Maribor	Ljubljana
17:15 CET	Issah 11'; Kapun 35', 90+3'	Report		Stadium: Stožice Stadium; Attendance: 7,000; Referee: Roberto Ponis

=== Second leg ===
24 October 2017	Mura	0–1 (0–5 agg.)	Celje	Murska Sobota
14:00 CEST		Report	Kesić 56'	Stadium: Fazanerija City Stadium; Attendance: 200; Referee: Dejan Balažič

25 October 2017	Krka	0–3 (0–3 agg.)	Aluminij	Novo Mesto
14:00 CEST		Report	Mesec 5'; Škoflek 41'; Mensah 72'	Stadium: Portoval; Attendance: 100; Referee: Dragoslav Perić

25 October 2017	Gorica	1–0 (2–0 agg.)	Triglav Kranj	Nova Gorica
17:15 CEST	Škarabot 78'	Report		Stadium: Nova Gorica Sports Park; Attendance: 400; Referee: Vojko Goričan

29 November 2017	Maribor	1–1 (1–4 agg.)	Olimpija Ljubljana	Maribor
20:15 CET	Bajde 15'	Report	Kronaveter 44'	Stadium: Ljudski vrt Attendance: 3,000; Referee: Dragoslav Perić

== Semi-finals ==
=== First leg ===
3 April 2018	Gorica	1–2	Aluminij	Nova Gorica
17:15 CEST	Marinič 69'	Report	Mensah 53', 64'	Stadium: Nova Gorica Sports Park; Attendance: 300; Referee: Dejan Balažič

4 April 2018	Olimpija Ljubljana	2–1	Celje	Ljubljana
18:00 CEST	Čanađija 50'; Issah 90'	Report	Vizinger 2'	Stadium: Stožice Stadium; Attendance: 1,000; Referee: Slavko Vinčić

=== Second leg ===
11 April 2018	Celje	0–1 (1–3 agg.)	Olimpija Ljubljana	Celje
17:15 CEST		Report	Zarifović 42'	Stadium: Stadion Z'dežele; Attendance: 2,370; Referee: Nejc Kajtazović

12 April 2018	Aluminij	2–2 (4–3 agg.)	Gorica	Kidričevo
17:15 CEST	Nunić 8'; Zeba 90+1' (pen.)	Report	Burgić 24'; Osuji 48'	Stadium: Aluminij Sports Park; Attendance: 250; Referee: Bojan Mertik

== Final ==
30 May 2018
20:15 CEST

Aluminij	1–6	Olimpija Ljubljana
Tahiraj 49'	Report	Benko 18', 58'; Kronaveter 36'; Alves 65'; Brkić 80'; Issah 85'

Stožice Stadium, Ljubljana
Attendance: 8,804
Referee: Andrej Žnidaršič
