= Joel Valencia =

Ecuadorian footballer (born 1994)

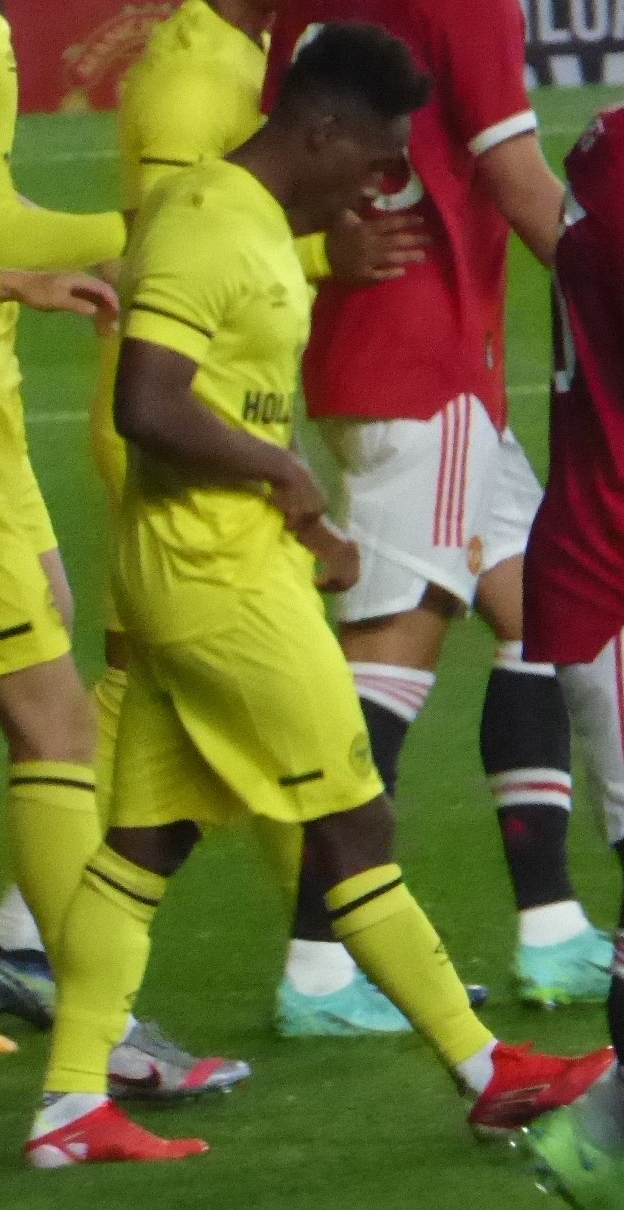
- Valencia while with Brentford in July 2021.

Personal information
- Full name: César Joel Valencia Castillo
- Date of birth: 16 November 1994 (age 31)
- Place of birth: Quinindé, Ecuador
- Height: 1.64 m (5 ft 5 in)
- Position: Winger

Team information
- Current team: Partyzant Leszno
- Number: 88

Youth career
- 2005–2013: Zaragoza

Senior career*
Years	Team	Apps	(Gls)
2011–2014	Zaragoza B	34	(0)
2011	Zaragoza	1	(0)
2014	→ Málaga B (loan)	14	(1)
2014–2015	Logroñés	50	(1)
2016–2017	Koper	26	(1)
2017–2019	Piast Gliwice	59	(9)
2019–2023	Brentford	19	(1)
2020–2021	→ Legia Warsaw (loan)	8	(0)
2022	→ Alcorcón (loan)	18	(0)
2022–2023	→ De Graafschap (loan)	18	(0)
2023–2025	Zagłębie Sosnowiec	56	(3)
2025–2026	Znicz Pruszków	3	(0)
2025–2026	Znicz Pruszków II	2	(1)
2026–	Partyzant Leszno	15	(0)

International career
2011	Spain U17	1	(0)
2011	Ecuador U17	3	(0)
- * Club domestic league appearances and goals as of 14:08, 9 August 2026 (UTC)

César Joel Valencia Castillo (born 16 November 1994) is an Ecuadorian footballer who plays as a winger for Liga okręgowa club Partyzant Leszno.

Valencia is a product of the Real Zaragoza academy and later played in Slovenia and Poland, rising to prominence in the latter country with Piast Gliwice. Following four years in England with Brentford, during which he predominantly played away on loan, he returned to Poland in 2023, where he played for Zagłębie Sosnowiec and Znicz Pruszków until his retirement from professional football in 2026. Valencia was capped by Spain and Ecuador at U17 level.

== Club career ==
=== Spain ===
A winger, Valencia joined the Real Zaragoza academy in 2005, at age 11. By 2011, he had progressed into the club's reserve team and was called into the first team squad on three occasions during the 2011–12 season. Valencia made his only senior appearance for the club as a substitute for Pablo Barrera late in a 6–0 La Liga defeat to Real Madrid on 28 August 2011. He spent much of the following three years in the reserve team and on loan at Málaga B, before departing La Romareda to join Segunda División B club Logroñés in August 2014. He remained with Logroñés until January 2016 and made 54 appearances for the club, scoring one goal.

=== Slovenia and Poland ===
On 27 January 2016, Valencia moved to Slovenia to join PrvaLiga club Koper. He made 28 appearances and scored two goals during 18 months at the Bonifika Stadium, before departing to join Polish Ekstraklasa club Piast Gliwice in August 2017, one a one-year contract, with a three-year option. Valencia was a part of the club's 2018–19 Ekstraklasa-winning team and his exploits were recognised with the Ekstraklasa and Polish Union of Footballers Player of the Year awards and a place in the Polish Union of Footballers Team of the Year. By the time of his departure in late July 2019, he had made 65 appearances and scored 9 goals for the club.

=== Brentford ===
On 31 July 2019, Valencia moved to England to join Championship club Brentford on a four-year contract for an undisclosed fee, reported to be £1.8 million. Despite making 23 appearances and scoring one goal, he struggled to adapt to the pace of English football during the 2019–20 season. Valencia's 24th and final Brentford appearance came as a late substitute in the opening match of the 2020–21 season.

Valencia played much of the remaining three years of his contract away on loan and Brentford's promotion to the Premier League at the end of the 2020–21 season pushed him further down the pecking order. He played for Polish Ekstraklasa club Legia Warsaw, Spanish Segunda División club AD Alcorcón and Dutch Eerste Divisie club De Graafschap. Valencia suffered a plethora of injury problems and made a combined 51 appearances for the three clubs.

=== Return to Poland ===
On 14 July 2023, Valencia returned to Poland to sign a two-year contract with I liga club Zagłębie Sosnowiec on a free transfer. He made 26 appearances and scored one goal during the 2023–24 season, which culminated in relegation to the II liga. Valencia made 32 appearances and scored two goals during a mid-table 2024–25 season. He suffered a lung contusion during the final match of the season, on which he underwent surgery. Valencia was released when his contract expired and he made 58 appearances and scored one goal during his two seasons with the club.

In September 2025, Valencia began training with I liga club Znicz Pruszków. He was announced as the club's player on 3 October and signed an undisclosed-length contract on a free transfer. Valencia made just three appearances prior to the termination of his contract by mutual consent on 14 January 2026.

In March 2026, Valencia announced his retirement from professional football and transferred to Liga okręgowa club Partyzant Leszno. He made 14 appearances during the remainder of a mid-table 2025–26 season.

== International career ==
Valencia was capped by Spain and Ecuador at U17 level. He was a part of Ecuador's 2011 FIFA U17 World Cup squad and made three appearances at the tournament.

== Personal life ==
Valencia was born in Quinindé, Esmeraldas, Ecuador and moved to Spain in 2002, at age 8. He has a Spanish passport. Valencia's partner, actress Paulina Chapko, gave birth to their child in July 2022.

== Career statistics ==
As of match played 7 August 2026

Appearances and goals by club, season and competition
Club	Season	League			National cup (Note: Includes Copa del Rey, Slovenian Cup, Polish Cup, FA Cup, KNVB Cup)		League cup (Note: Includes EFL Cup)		Europe		Other		Total	
Club	Season	Division	Apps	Goals	Apps	Goals	Apps	Goals	Apps	Goals	Apps	Goals	Apps	Goals
Zaragoza	2011–12	La Liga	1	0	0	0	—		—		—		1	0
Zaragoza B	2011–12	Segunda División B Group 3	19	0	—		—		—		—		19	0
Zaragoza B	2012–13	Segunda División B Group 2	14	0	—		—		—		—		14	0
Zaragoza B	2013–14	Tercera División Group 17	1	0	—		—		—		—		1	0
Zaragoza B	Total		34	0	—		—		—		—		34	0
Málaga B (loan)	2013–14	Tercera División Group 9	14	1	—		—		—		4 (Note: Appearances in Tercera División play-offs)	0	18	1
Logroñés	2014–15	Segunda División B Group 1	33	1	0	0	—		—		2 (Note: Appearances in Segunda División B promotion play-offs)	0	35	1
Logroñés	2015–16	Segunda División B Group 1	17	0	2	0	—		—		—		19	0
Logroñés	Total		50	1	2	0	—		—		2	0	54	1
Koper	2015–16	Slovenian PrvaLiga	13	1	0	0	—		—		—		13	1
Koper	2016–17	Slovenian PrvaLiga	13	0	2	1	—		—		—		15	1
Koper	Total		26	1	2	1	—		—		—		28	2
Piast Gliwice	2017–18	Ekstraklasa	25	3	1	0	—		—		—		26	3
Piast Gliwice	2018–19	Ekstraklasa	33	6	1	0	—		—		—		34	6
Piast Gliwice	2019–20	Ekstraklasa	1	0	—		—		3 (Note: Two appearances in UEFA Champions League, one appearance in UEFA Europa League)	0	1 (Note: Appearance in Polish Super Cup)	0	5	0
Piast Gliwice	Total		59	9	2	0	—		3	0	1	0	65	9
Brentford	2019–20	Championship	19	1	2	0	1	0	—		1 (Note: Appearances in Championship play-offs)	0	23	1
Brentford	2020–21	Championship	0	0	0	0	1	0	—		—		1	0
Brentford	Total		19	1	2	0	2	0	—		1	0	24	1
Legia Warsaw (loan)	2020–21	Ekstraklasa	8	0	1	0	—		2 (Note: Appearances in Europa League)	0	1	0	12	0
AD Alcorcón (loan)	2021–22	Segunda División	18	0	—		—		—		—		18	0
De Graafschap (loan)	2022–23	Eerste Divisie	18	0	3	0	—		—		—		21	0
Zagłębie Sosnowiec	2023–24	I liga	25	1	1	0	—		—		—		26	1
Zagłębie Sosnowiec	2024–25	II liga	31	2	1	0	—		—		—		32	2
Zagłębie Sosnowiec	Total		56	3	2	0	—		—		—		58	3
Znicz Pruszków	2025–26	I liga	3	0	0	0	—		—		—		3	0
Znicz Pruszków II	2025–26	V liga Masovia Group 2	2	1	—		—		—		—		2	1
Partyzant Leszno	2025–26	Liga okręgowa Warsaw Group 2	14	0	—		—		—		—		14	0
Partyzant Leszno	2026–27	Liga okręgowa Warsaw Group 2	1	0	—		—		—		—		1	0
Partyzant Leszno	Total		15	0	—		—		—		—		15	3
Career total			323	17	14	1	2	0	5	0	9	0	353	18

== Honours ==
Piast Gliwice

- Ekstraklasa: 2018–19

Individual

- Ekstraklasa Player of the Year: 2018–19
- Ekstraklasa Midfielder of the Year: 2018–19
- Polish Union of Footballers Player of the Year: 2018–19
- Polish Union of Footballers Team of the Year: 2018–19
