= Rodolfo Vanoli =

Italian footballer and manager

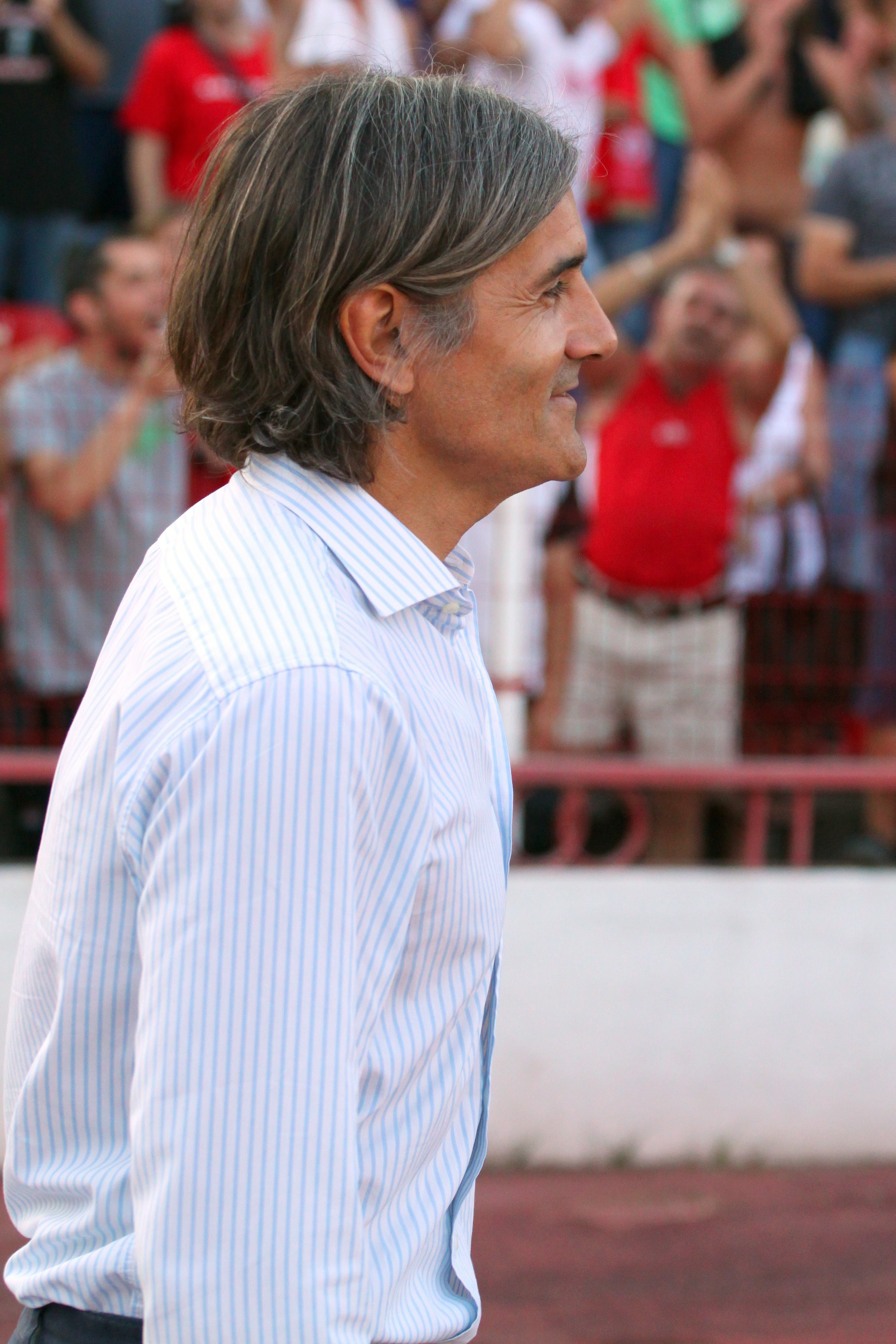
- Vanoli in 2012

Personal information
- Date of birth: 11 January 1963 (age 63)
- Place of birth: Gavirate, Italy
- Position: Defender

Team information
- Current team: Salernitana Women (head coach)

Youth career
- Varese

Senior career*
Years	Team	Apps	(Gls)
1981–1982	Varese	0	(0)
1982–1983	Solbiatese	25	(1)
1983–1984	Pro Patria	9	(0)
1984–1989	Lecce	165	(4)
1989–1992	Udinese	72	(0)
1992–1995	SPAL	49	(2)
1995–1996	Saronno	20	(0)
1996–1997	Como	5	(0)
1997–1998	Solbiatese	12	(0)
1998–1999	Canobbiese	19	(5)
1999–2000	Chiasso	15	(3)

Managerial career
- 2001–2004: Mendrisio-Stabio
- 2005: Lugano
- 2005–2006: Bellinzona
- 2010: Colligiana
- 2011: Pordenone
- 2012–2014: Koper
- 2015: Koper
- 2016: Olimpija Ljubljana
- 2019: Bisceglie
- 2021: Koper
- 2022: Dinamo Tirana
- 2024–2025: Samgurali
- 2025–: Salernitana Women
- * Club domestic league appearances and goals

Rodolfo Vanoli (born 11 January 1963) is an Italian professional football manager and former player, currently in charge of Women's football club Salernitana, playing in the Serie C league.

== Playing career ==
Vanoli, a defender, started his career with Varese. He then went on to play football professionally, making his Serie A debut in 1985 with Lecce. In 1989, he joined Udinese, playing Serie A and Serie B with the Friuliani. He retired in 2000 after a single season with Swiss club Chiasso.

== Managerial career ==
Vanoli started his career as a coach in Switzerland. In 2010, he returned to Italy and took charge at Colligiana. He moved to Pordenone in 2011. Vanoli worked in Slovenia as a manager of Koper and Olimpija Ljubljana.

In 2019, he was appointed head coach of Serie C club Bisceglie, eventually saving them from relegation and being confirmed for the 2019–20 season. He was dismissed on 2 October 2019 due to poor results.

In February 2021, Vanoli returned to Koper and signed a contract for the remainder of the 2020–21 season.

He successively worked in 2022 as the head coach of Albanian club Dinamo Tirana and, from 2024 to 2025, in Georgia with Samgurali.

On 16 August 2025, Vanoli took his first role in charge of a women's football club, becoming the manager of Serie C club Salernitana Women.

== Personal life ==
He has a younger brother, Paolo, who is also a former footballer and current coach.

== Honours ==
=== Manager ===
Koper

- Slovenian Cup: 2014–15
- Slovenian Supercup: 2015

Olimpija Ljubljana

- Slovenian PrvaLiga: 2015–16
