= Seferović =

Seferović (Bosnian pronunciation: [sěferoʋitɕ, sefěː-]) is a Bosnian surname. Seferović surname is made of Turkish word "sefer" that means war or expedition. Seferović in Bosnian Means "son of Sefer", so the suffix "ović" is denoting a descendant, in this case the descendants of Sefer were the Seferovići, which would mean that the progenitor of Seferović was a certain Sefer. Sefer was most probably a soldier. Also, there is two villages in Bosnia that are called Seferovići. Notable people with the surname include:

- Haris Seferovic (born 1992), Swiss footballer
- Matic Seferović (born 1986), Slovenian footballer
- Sead Seferović (born 1970), Bosnian footballer
