= Denis Šme =

Slovenian footballer

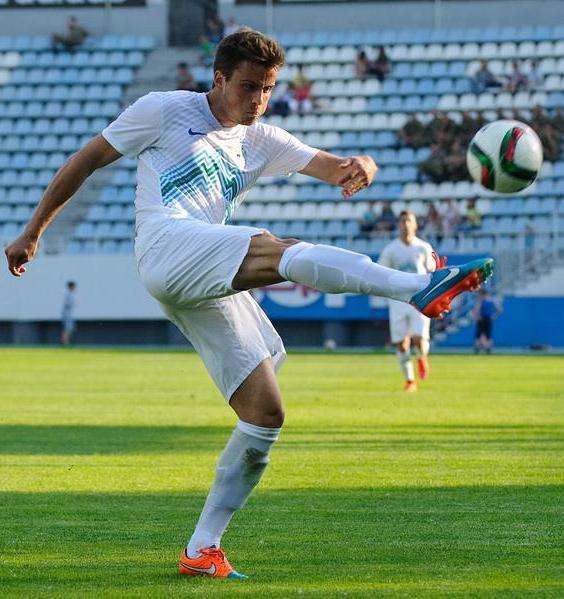
- Šme with Slovenia U21 in 2015

Personal information
- Date of birth: 22 March 1994 (age 32)
- Place of birth: Slovenj Gradec, Slovenia
- Height: 1.84 m (6 ft 0 in)
- Position: Defender

Team information
- Current team: WSG Radenthein
- Number: 5

Youth career
- –2010: Rudar Velenje
- 2011: Chievo
- 2011–2012: Koper

Senior career*
Years	Team	Apps	(Gls)
2012–2015	Koper	58	(0)
2014	→ Jadran Dekani (loan)	1	(0)
2016–2019	Maribor	26	(0)
2018	→ Aluminij (loan)	14	(0)
2019–2022	Olimpija Ljubljana	20	(0)
2022	DSV Leoben	0	(0)
2022–2023	FC Hermagor	23	(2)
2023–	WSG Radenthein	10	(0)

International career
2009–2010	Slovenia U16	3	(0)
2010	Slovenia U17	5	(0)
2011–2012	Slovenia U18	13	(0)
2012	Slovenia U19	7	(0)
2014–2016	Slovenia U21	12	(0)
- * Club domestic league appearances and goals as of 16 January 2024

Denis Šme (born 22 March 1994) is a Slovenian footballer who plays as a defender for Austrian club WSG Radenthein.

== Honours ==
Koper

- Slovenian Cup: 2014–15
- Slovenian Supercup: 2015

Maribor

- Slovenian Championship: 2016–17
- Slovenian Cup: 2015–16

Olimpija Ljubljana

- Slovenian Cup: 2020–21
