= Vasja Simčič =

Slovenian footballer

Personal information
- Full name: Vasja Simčič
- Date of birth: 1 July 1983 (age 43)
- Place of birth: Kanal, SFR Yugoslavia
- Height: 1.82 m (5 ft 11 1/2 in)
- Position: Goalkeeper

Youth career
- Bilje
- Brda
- –2002: Gorica

Senior career*
| Years | Team | Apps | (Gls) |
| 2002–2014 | Gorica | 192 | (0) |
| 2002 | → Izola (loan) | 1 | (0) |
| 2003–2004 | → Brda (loan) | 16 | (0) |
| 2014 | → Koper (loan) | 16 | (0) |
| 2014–2016 | Koper | 40 | (0) |
| 2016 | → Tolmin (loan) | 11 | (0) |
| 2019-2020 | Tabor Sežana | 1 | (0) |

International career
| 2004–2005 | Slovenia U21 | 7 | (0) |
- * Club domestic league appearances and goals as of 19 January 2024

Vasja Simčič (born 1 July 1983) is a Slovenian retired football goalkeeper.

== Honours ==
Gorica

- Slovenian PrvaLiga: 2003–04, 2004–05, 2005–06

Koper

- Slovenian Cup: 2014–15
- Slovenian Supercup: 2015
