= Goran Galešić =

Bosnian footballer (born 1989)

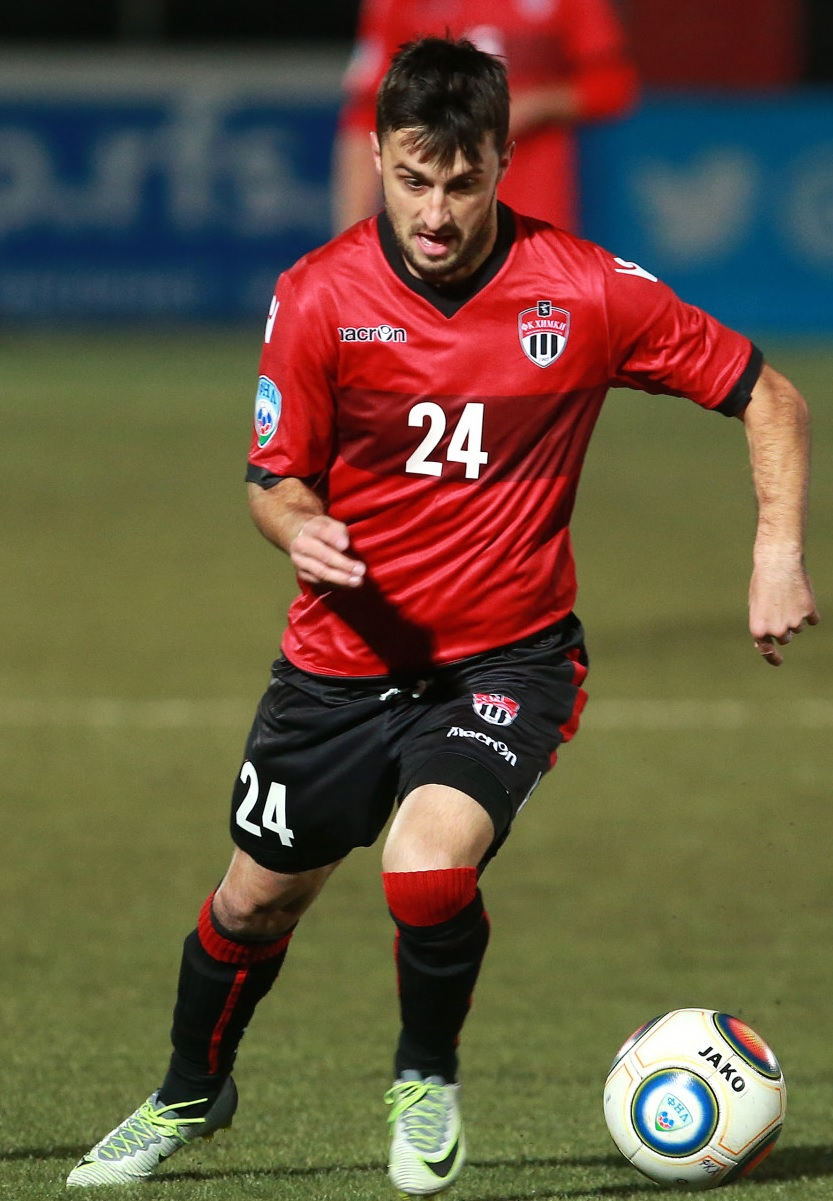
- Galešić playing for Khimki in 2016

Personal information
- Date of birth: 11 March 1989 (age 37)
- Place of birth: Banja Luka, SFR Yugoslavia
- Height: 1.75 m (5 ft 9 in)
- Position: Midfielder

Team information
- Current team: Goražde
- Number: 2

Youth career
- –2007: Borac Banja Luka
- 2007–2008: Gorica

Senior career*
Years	Team	Apps	(Gls)
–2007	Borac Banja Luka		
2007–2012	Gorica	104	(23)
2012	Beerschot	12	(0)
2013	Koper	13	(3)
2013	Hajduk Split	0	(0)
2013–2014	Koper	29	(10)
2014	Botev Plovdiv	5	(0)
2015	Koper	14	(2)
2016	Sheriff Tiraspol	10	(1)
2016	Khimki	8	(0)
2017	Celje	3	(0)
2017	Borac Banja Luka	17	(3)
2018	Krupa	11	(0)
2018–2019	Floriana	3	(0)
2019–2020	Koper	15	(4)
2020	Zvijezda 09	1	(0)
2020–	Goražde	9	(1)

International career
2007	Bosnia and Herzegovina U18		
2007	Bosnia and Herzegovina U19		
2009–2010	Bosnia and Herzegovina U21 (Note: Official UEFA competitive matches only.)	7	(0)
- * Club domestic league appearances and goals as of 14 November 2020

Goran Galešić (born 11 March 1989) is a Bosnian professional footballer who plays as a midfielder for First League of FBiH club Goražde.

== Club career ==
Galešić started his career at Borac Banja Luka. In 2007, he joined Slovenian club Gorica, where he stayed until the summer of 2010, when his contract with the club expired. In June 2010 it was reported by the media that Galešić has signed a three-year contract with Serbian team Partizan. However, in September 2010 Galešić returned to Gorica after negotiations failed with Partizan. Galešić signed a two-year contract with possible extension for another year.

In 2012, he signed a one-year contract with Beerschot and played in several matches, before being released in December of the same year.

In June 2013 he signed a contract with Hajduk Split but three weeks later, in July 2013, his contract was mutually terminated after continuous racial abuse from a small, radical minority of Hajduk's fans.

=== Botev Plovdiv ===
Galešić signed a two-year contract with Botev Plovdiv on 22 August 2014. He made an unofficial debut for his new team during the friendly game with Rakovski. Galešić scored two goals as Botev Plovdiv won the game 6–5.

Galešić made a debut for Botev Plovdiv in A Grupa on 12 September 2014. He was brought on as a substitute during the second half in the match against Ludogorets Razgrad. He played well and was involved in the goal scored by his team but it was not enough because his team had conceived two goals before his appearance on the field and Botev Plovdiv lost the game 2–1. At the end of 2014 Goran Galešić became a free agent after a mutual termination of his contract with Botev Plovdiv.

=== Sheriff Tiraspol ===
On 29 May 2016, Galešić scored the goal to win the Divizia Națională with Sheriff Tiraspol.

=== Celje ===
He signed for Celje in the Slovenian PrvaLiga on 21 January 2017.

== International career ==
Galešić was capped for Bosnia and Herzegovina at under-18, under-19, and under-U21 levels.

== Honours ==
Koper

- Slovenian Cup: 2014–15
- Slovenian Supercup: 2015

Sheriff Tiraspol

- Divizia Națională: 2015–16
