= Matej Palčič =

Slovenian footballer

Personal information
- Date of birth: 21 June 1993 (age 33)
- Place of birth: Koper, Slovenia
- Height: 1.81 m (5 ft 11 in)
- Position: Right-back

Youth career
- Jadran Dekani
- 2008–2011: Koper

Senior career*
Years	Team	Apps	(Gls)
2011–2015	Koper	95	(8)
2016–2018	Maribor	24	(0)
2016	Maribor B	1	(0)
2018–2019	Wisła Kraków	20	(2)
2019–2020	Sheriff Tiraspol	2	(0)
2020–2024	Koper	106	(4)
Total		248	(14)

International career
2010	Slovenia U18	4	(0)
2011–2012	Slovenia U19	16	(1)
2013	Slovenia U20	1	(0)
2013–2014	Slovenia U21	10	(0)
2017	Slovenia	1	(0)
- * Club domestic league appearances and goals

Matej Palčič (born 21 June 1993) is a former Slovenian professional footballer who played as a defender.

Palčič was capped once by Slovenia, in a June 2017 World Cup qualification match against Malta.

== Honours ==
Koper

- Slovenian Cup: 2014–15, 2021–22
- Slovenian Supercup: 2015

Maribor

- Slovenian PrvaLiga: 2016–17

Sheriff Tiraspol

- Moldovan Super Liga: 2019
