= Josip Ivančić =

Croatian footballer

Personal information
- Date of birth: 29 March 1991 (age 35)
- Place of birth: Zagreb, Croatia
- Height: 1.93 m (6 ft 4 in)
- Position: Striker

Team information
- Current team: Francavilla
- Number: 91

Youth career
- 2002–2006: Croatia Sesvete
- 2007: Radnik Sesvete
- 2007–2010: Croatia Sesvete

Senior career*
Years	Team	Apps	(Gls)
2010–2011	Croatia Sesvete	18	(4)
2011–2014	Zadar	92	(17)
2014–2016	Rijeka	12	(1)
2014	→ Rijeka II	5	(3)
2015	→ Koper (loan)	14	(4)
2016–2017	Sheriff Tiraspol	21	(5)
2017–2018	Hapoel Ashkelon	29	(5)
2018	Hapoel Haifa	15	(0)
2018	Ashdod	11	(2)
2019	Atyrau	7	(1)
2019–2020	Chindia Târgoviște	20	(2)
2020–2021	Zrinjski Mostar	19	(5)
2021	Sabah	7	(2)
2022	Hanoi	5	(0)
2023	Lampang	13	(1)
2023–2024	Zvijezda 09	10	(1)
2024–	Francavilla	6	(0)
- * Club domestic league appearances and goals as of 17 November 2024

Josip Ivančić (born 29 March 1991) is a Croatian professional footballer who plays as a striker for Italian Serie D club Francavilla.

== Club career ==
Ivančić started his football career in his hometown Sesvete, debuting for Croatia Sesvete in the 2010–11 2. HNL season. In July 2011, he moved to Zadar in Croatia's 1. HNL where he played until August 2014 when he was transferred to Rijeka.

In January 2016, Ivančić was transferred to Moldovan Divizia Națională club Sheriff Tiraspol, leaving the club in January of the following year. After Sheriff, he spent his time in Israel playing for Hapoel Ashkelon, Hapoel Haifa and Ashdod. After Israel, Ivančić played for Kazakhstan Premier League club Atyrau and Romanian club Chindia Târgoviște.

On 24 August 2020, he signed a two-year contract with Bosnian Premier League club Zrinjski Mostar. Three days later, on 27 August, Ivančić made his official debut and scored his first goal for Zrinjski in a game against Differdange 03 in the 2020–21 UEFA Europa League first qualifying round. He decided to leave the club in April 2021, near the end of the 2020–21 season.

On 4 January 2022, he signed a two-year contract with V.League 1 club Hanoi.

On 10 September 2023, Ivančić signed with FK Zvijezda 09.

== Honours ==
Koper

- Slovenian Supercup: 2015

Sheriff Tiraspol

- Divizia Națională: 2015–16
- Moldovan Super Cup: 2016

Hapoel Haifa

- Israel State Cup: 2017–18
