= Jan Andrejašič =

Slovenian footballer (born 1995)

Personal information
- Date of birth: 16 September 1995 (age 31)
- Height: 1.83 m (6 ft 0 in)
- Position: Full-back

Team information
- Current team: Izola

Youth career
- –2009: Jadran Dekani
- 2009–2010: Koper
- 2010–2011: Jadran Dekani
- 2011–2014: Koper

Senior career*
Years	Team	Apps	(Gls)
2013–2017	Koper	50	(3)
2014	→ Jadran Dekani (loan)	9	(1)
2017–2019	Celje	24	(1)
2019–2022	Olimpija Ljubljana	62	(0)
2022–2023	Gorica	12	(0)
2023	Rogaška	9	(0)
2024–	Izola	1	(0)

International career
2013	Slovenia U19	4	(0)
2016	Slovenia U21	2	(0)
- * Club domestic league appearances and goals as of 18 August 2024

Jan Andrejašič (born 16 September 1995) is a Slovenian footballer who plays as a full-back for Izola.

== Club career ==
Andrejašič joined Olimpija Ljubljana from Celje in February 2019. He broke his pelvis in October 2022, after having just moved to Gorica.
