= Leon Sever =

Slovenian footballer

Personal information
- Date of birth: 9 April 1998 (age 28)
- Place of birth: Brussels, Belgium
- Height: 1.75 m (5 ft 9 in)
- Position: Attacking midfielder

Team information
- Current team: Tabor Sežana

Youth career
- –2014: Izola
- 2015–2017: Koper

Senior career*
Years	Team	Apps	(Gls)
2016–2017	Koper	2	(0)
2017–2021	Tabor Sežana	125	(21)
2021	Manisa	0	(0)
2021–2022	Bravo	16	(0)
2022–2023	Radomlje	24	(0)
2023–2024	Jadran Dekani	14	(4)
2024–2025	Hapoel Nof HaGalil	33	(3)
2025–	Tabor Sežana	0	(0)

International career
2016	Slovenia U18	2	(0)
2019	Slovenia U21	4	(0)
- * Club domestic league appearances and goals as of 15 June 2025

Leon Sever (born 9 April 1998) is a Slovenian footballer who plays as a midfielder for Tabor Sežana.

== Career ==
Born in Brussels, Belgium, Sever started his career in Slovenia at the age of four with Izola. At the age of 13, he joined the youth academy of Italian side Triestina, but soon left after the club went bankrupt and returned to Izola. In the middle of the 2014–15 season, Sever transferred to Koper.

In 2017, he signed for Tabor Sežana in the Slovenian second division.
