= Jakov Biljan =

Croatian footballer

Personal information
- Date of birth: 2 August 1995 (age 31)
- Place of birth: Zagreb, Croatia
- Height: 1.78 m (5 ft 10 in)
- Position: Midfielder

Team information
- Current team: Vukovar 1991
- Number: 6

Youth career
- Dinamo Zagreb

Senior career*
Years	Team	Apps	(Gls)
2014–2016	Dinamo Zagreb	0	(0)
2014–2015	→ Lokomotiva (loan)	4	(0)
2016	→ Koper (loan)	19	(0)
2015–2019	Dinamo Zagreb II	10	(0)
2019	Jelgava	22	(1)
2020–	Vukovar 1991	124	(6)

International career
2011	Croatia U17	3	(0)
2013	Croatia U19	3	(1)
- * Club domestic league appearances and goals as of 15 June 2026

Jakov Biljan (born 2 August 1995) is a Croatian football midfielder who plays for Vukovar 1991. (Note: Jakov Biljan at WorldFootball.net)
