= Jaka Štromajer =

Slovenian footballer (born 1983)

Personal information
- Date of birth: 27 July 1983 (age 43)
- Place of birth: Domžale, SR Slovenia, SFR Yugoslavia
- Height: 1.85 m (6 ft 1 in)
- Positions: Forward; winger

Team information
- Current team: Korte (head coach)

Youth career
- Zarica Kranj
- –2001: Triglav Kranj

Senior career*
Years	Team	Apps	(Gls)
2000–2001	Triglav Kranj	13	(3)
2001–2002	Domžale	23	(5)
2002–2004	Koper	26	(2)
2002–2003	→ Portorož Piran (loan)	10	(8)
2004–2005	Celje	28	(1)
2005–2006	Drava Ptuj	16	(3)
2006–2007	Triglav Kranj	26	(7)
2007–2011	Pandurii Târgu Jiu	99	(13)
2008–2009	→ CSM Râmnicu Vâlcea (loan)	24	(10)
2012–2013	Oțelul Galați	45	(2)
2014–2017	Koper	93	(21)
2017	→ Ankaran (loan)	10	(5)
2017	Kras Repen	10	(1)
2018–2019	Koper	45	(28)
2020	Radomlje	1	(0)
2020–2022	Izola	28	(16)
Total		497	(125)

International career
1999	Slovenia U16		
2000–2001	Slovenia U17		
2001	Slovenia U18		
2001	Slovenia U19		
2001–2003	Slovenia U20		
2002–2005	Slovenia U21		

Managerial career
- 2022–2023: Koper (assistant)
- 2023–2026: Izola (U19)
- 2026–: Korte
- * Club domestic league appearances and goals

Jaka Štromajer (born 27 July 1983) is a Slovenian former professional footballer who played as a forward.

== Honours ==
Koper

- Slovenian Cup: 2014–15
- Slovenian Supercup: 2015
