= 2014–15 Slovenian Football Cup =

Tournament details
- Country: Slovenia
- Teams: 28

Final positions
- Champions: Koper (3rd title)
- Runners-up: Celje

Tournament statistics
- Matches played: 33
- Goals scored: 111 (3.36 per match)
- Attendance: 23,890 (724 per match)
- Top goal scorer(s): Sunny Omoregie (6 goals)

The 2014–15 Slovenian Football Cup was the 24th season of the Slovenian Football Cup, Slovenia's football knockout competition. Gorica were the defending champions, having won their third cup title in the 2013–14 edition.

== Qualified clubs ==
=== 2013–14 Slovenian PrvaLiga members ===
- Celje
- Domžale
- Gorica
- Koper
- Krka
- Maribor
- Olimpija
- Rudar Velenje
- Triglav Kranj
- Zavrč

=== Qualified through MNZ Regional Cups ===
- MNZ Celje: Šmarje pri Jelšah, Šmartno 1928
- MNZ Koper: Jadran Dekani, Tabor Sežana
- MNZG-Kranj: Kranj, Šenčur
- MNZ Lendava: Odranci, Nafta 1903
- MNZ Ljubljana: Dob, Radomlje
- MNZ Maribor: Korotan Prevalje, Lenart
- MNZ Murska Sobota: Tromejnik, Veržej
- MNZ Nova Gorica: Adria, Brda
- MNZ Ptuj: Drava Ptuj, Aluminij

== First round ==
Slovenian PrvaLiga clubs Gorica, Koper, Maribor and Rudar Velenje joined the competition in the second round (round of 16).

19 August 2014	Tabor Sežana	2–0	Aluminij	Sežana
16:00 CEST	Barut 9'; Stančič 78' (pen.)	Report		Stadium: Rajko Štolfa Stadium; Attendance: 60; Referee: Rade Obrenović

20 August 2014	Tromejnik	0–4	Olimpija	Kuzma
16:00 CEST		Report	Valenčič 7'; Đurković 65'; Zarifović 81'; Omladič 87'	Stadium: Kuzma Football Stadium; Attendance: 550; Referee: Alen Borošak

20 August 2014	Dob	1–6	Celje	Dob
16:00 CEST	Bilali 29' (o.g.)	Report	Omoregie 10'; Gobec 48' (pen.); Djermanović 68'; Miškić 79'; Žurej 84'; Češnjevar 90' (o.g.)	Stadium: Sports Park; Attendance: 300; Referee: Nejc Kajtazović

20 August 2014	Odranci	0–4	Kranj	Odranci
16:00 CEST		Report	Pirc 11'; Šujica 12', 37'; Božičić 74'	Stadium: ŠRC Odranci; Attendance: 180; Referee: Peter Mertelj

20 August 2014	Nafta 1903	0–1 (a.e.t.)	Šenčur	Lendava
16:00 CEST		Report	Ljubijankić 120'	Stadium: Lendava Sports Park; Attendance: 150; Referee: Tadej Mežnar

20 August 2014	Drava Ptuj	2–3 (a.e.t.)	Veržej	Ptuj
16:00 CEST	Panikvar 45' (pen.); Lavrinc 54'	Report	Vinkovič 59', 78'; Mauko 98'	Stadium: Ptuj City Stadium; Attendance: 100; Referee: Marko Lacković

20 August 2014	Šmarje pri Jelšah	2–4	Krka	Šmarje pri Jelšah
16:00 CEST	Firšt 7'; Mauher 15'	Report	Ejup 37'; Fuček 48'; Kastrevec 77'; Šaban 80'	Stadium: Sports Park; Attendance: 150; Referee: Miran Bukovec

20 August 2014	Lenart	0–5	Triglav Kranj	Lenart v Slovenskih Goricah
16:00 CEST		Report	M. Poplatnik 37', 66'; Gerić 51'; Zupančič 73'; Krempl 80' (o.g.)	Stadium: ŠRC Polena; Attendance: 500; Referee: Asmir Sagrković

20 August 2014	Šmartno 1928	0–5	Domžale	Šmartno ob Paki
16:00 CEST		Report	Ožbolt 33'; Parker 41', 61'; Aneff 61'; Korun 83'	Stadium: Šmartno Stadium; Attendance: 300; Referee: Dragoslav Perić

20 August 2014	Jadran Dekani	0–2	Zavrč	Dekani
16:00 CEST		Report	Datković 2'; Antolek 72'	Stadium: Dekani Sports Park; Attendance: 200; Referee: Marko Podgoršek

20 August 2014	Adria	1–6	Radomlje	Miren
17:00 CEST	Baša 81'	Report	Jakovljević 12'; Zorc 26'; Seferović 51'; Vrhunc 72', 83' (pen.); Smrtnik 78'	Stadium: Pri Štantu Stadium; Attendance: 100; Referee: Roberto Ponis

20 August 2014	Korotan Prevalje	2–0 (a.e.t.)	Brda	Prevalje
18:00 CEST	Janet 95'; Marinković 107'	Report		Stadium: Stadion na Prevaljah; Attendance: 400; Referee: Iztok Gornjak

== Round of 16 ==
16 September 2014	Kranj	1–2	Celje	Kranj
16:00 CEST	Robnik 28'	Report	Omoregie 55', 57'	Stadium: Stanko Mlakar; Attendance: 350; Referee: Davor Drečnik

16 September 2014	Korotan Prevalje	0–4	Olimpija	Prevalje
18:00 CEST		Report	Valenčič 9'; Vukčević 58', 64'; Đurković 67'	Stadium: Stadion na Prevaljah; Attendance: 850; Referee: Nejc Kajtazović

17 September 2014	Šenčur	0–2	Zavrč	Šenčur
17:00 CEST		Report	Cvek 65'; Antolek 75'	Stadium: Šenčur Sports Park; Attendance: 100; Referee: Alen Borošak

17 September 2014	Tabor Sežana	0–1	Koper	Sežana
16:00 CEST		Report	Štromajer 80'	Stadium: Rajko Štolfa Stadium; Attendance: 150; Referee: Andrej Žnidaršič

17 September 2014	Rudar Velenje	0–1	Krka	Velenje
17:00 CEST		Report	Fuček 78'	Stadium: Ob Jezeru; Attendance: 200; Referee: Marko Podgoršek

17 September 2014	Triglav Kranj	3–3 (a.e.t.) (3–4 p)	Domžale	Kranj
16:00 CEST	M. Poplatnik 69'; Djukić 81'; Pihler 115'	Report	Aneff 26'; Husmani 64'; Korun 94'	Stadium: Stanko Mlakar; Attendance: 200; Referee: Bojan Mertik
	Penalties
	Šmit (penalty scored); M. Poplatnik (penalty scored); Pihler (penalty missed); Poljanec (penalty scored); A. Poplatnik (penalty missed)		(penalty scored) Korun; (penalty scored) Morel; (penalty scored) Jelar; (penalty missed) Ožbolt; (penalty scored) Skubic

8 October 2014	Veržej	0–2	Gorica	Veržej
15:00 CEST		Report	Džuzdanović 26'; Majcen 87'	Stadium: Čistina Stadium; Attendance: 150; Referee: Asmir Sagrković

28 October 2014	Maribor	1–0	Radomlje	Maribor
20:00 CET	Zahović 25'	Report		Stadium: Ljudski vrt Attendance: 2,000; Referee: Roman Glažar

Notes

1. The match between Veržej and Gorica was postponed and rescheduled to a later date due to waterlogged pitch.
2. The match between Maribor and Radomlje was postponed and rescheduled to a later date due to Maribor's UEFA campaign.

== Quarter-finals ==
=== First leg ===
22 October 2014	Zavrč	2–3	Celje	Ptuj
15:00 CEST	Datković 43'; Matjašič 78'	Report	Žurej 17'; Ahmedi 56'; Omoregie 75'	Stadium: Ptuj City Stadium; Attendance: 150; Referee: Bojan Mertik

22 October 2014	Gorica	3–1	Koper	Nova Gorica
17:00 CEST	Majcen 37'; Napoli 47'; Innocenti 56'	Report	Lotrič 63'	Stadium: Nova Gorica Sports Park; Attendance: 250; Referee: Rade Obrenović

22 October 2014	Domžale	0–1	Olimpija	Domžale
18:00 CEST		Report	Zarifović 34'	Stadium: Domžale Sports Park; Attendance: 900; Referee: Nejc Kajtazović

19 November 2014	Krka	1–2	Maribor	Novo Mesto
14:00 CET	Fuček 24'	Report	Mendy 35'; Mejač 65'	Stadium: Portoval; Attendance: 300; Referee: Asmir Sagrković

=== Second leg ===
28 October 2014	Olimpija	1–3 (2–3 agg.)	Domžale	Ljubljana
18:00 CET	Burgić 82'	Report	Korun 8'; Maksimović 18'; Zec 41'	Stadium: Stožice; Attendance: 2,000; Referee: Davor Drečnik

29 October 2014	Koper	4–1 (a.e.t.) (5–4 agg.)	Gorica	Koper
17:30 CET	Štromajer 30'; Gregorič 57'; Štulac 90+2'; Pučko 98'	Report	Henty 45' (pen.)	Stadium: Bonifika; Attendance: 400; Referee: Slavko Vinčić

29 October 2014	Celje	2–1 (5–3 agg.)	Zavrč	Celje
18:00 CET	Verbič 47'; Omoregie 70'	Report	Matjašič 39'	Stadium: Arena Petrol; Attendance: 400; Referee: Matej Jug

3 December 2014	Maribor	4–2 (6–3 agg.)	Krka	Maribor
17:30 CET	Bohar 23', 68'; Zahović 66'; Biton 72'	Report	Kastrevec 4'; Fuček 63'	Stadium: Ljudski vrt Attendance: 1,200; Referee: Dejan Balažič

Notes

3. Due to the renovation of the Zavrč Sports Park, during the first part of the 2014–15 season, Zavrč played their home matches at the Ptuj City Stadium in Ptuj, roughly 20 kilometres from Zavrč.
4. The quarter-final matches between NK Maribor and NK Krka were postponed and rescheduled to a later date, as during the original first and second leg schedule (e.g. 22 October 2014 and 29 October 2019) the opponent of Krka was not established, due to Maribor's UEFA campaign.

== Semi-finals ==
=== First leg ===
14 April 2015	Koper	1–0	Domžale	Koper
17:00 CEST	Guberac 5'	Report		Stadium: Bonifika; Attendance: 500; Referee: Andrej Žnidaršič

15 April 2015	Maribor	2–3	Celje	Maribor
17:00 CEST	Tavares 53'; Volaš 66'	Report	Omoregie 11'; Vrhovec 88'; Lendrić 90+3'	Stadium: Ljudski vrt Attendance: 3,000; Referee: Dejan Balažič

=== Second leg ===
21 April 2015	Celje	0–0 (3–2 agg.)	Maribor	Celje
17:00 CEST		Report		Stadium: Arena Petrol; Attendance: 3,800; Referee: Mitja Žganec

22 April 2015	Domžale	1–1 (1–2 agg.)	Koper	Domžale
17:00 CEST	Črnic 69'	Report	Halilović 61'	Stadium: Domžale Sports Park; Attendance: 1,000; Referee: Matej Jug

== Final ==
20 May 2015
20:30 CEST

Koper	2–0	Celje
Halilović 6'; Štromajer 87'	Report

Bonifika, Koper
Attendance: 3,000
Referee: Slavko Vinčić
