= Fabian Lokaj =

Albanian footballer

Personal information
- Date of birth: 23 August 1996 (age 30)
- Place of birth: Bern, Switzerland
- Height: 1.85 m (6 ft 1 in)
- Position: Forward

Team information
- Current team: FC Muri-Gümligen

Youth career
- –2012: Young Boys
- 2012–2013: Thun

Senior career*
Years	Team	Apps	(Gls)
2013–2015	Thun II	29	(9)
2015–2016	FC Köniz	0	(0)
2016	Koper	9	(1)
2016–2017	Poli Timișoara	0	(0)
2017	Chiasso	6	(0)
2017	Gaz Metan Mediaș	5	(0)
2018	Schwarz-Weiß Rehden	11	(3)
2018	VfL Oldenburg	12	(1)
2019–2021	FC Köniz	18	(1)
2021	FC Prishtina Bern		
2021–2023	FC Muri-Gümligen		
2019–	FC Köniz		
2019–	FC Muri-Gümligen	15	(8)

International career
2011–2012	Albania U17	6	(1)
2014	Albania U19	3	(0)
- * Club domestic league appearances and goals as of 16:07, 5 February 2020 (UTC)

Fabian Lokaj (born 23 August 1996) is a professional footballer who plays as a forward for FC Muri-Gümligen. Born in Switzerland, he has represented Albania internationally at youth level.

== Club career ==
Ahead of the 2019–20 season, Lokaj returned to FC Köniz.

== International career ==
Lokaj received his first Albania under-17 call-up by manager Džemal Mustedanagić for a friendly tournament developed in August 2012 in Romania.
