= Dalibor Radujko =

Slovenian footballer

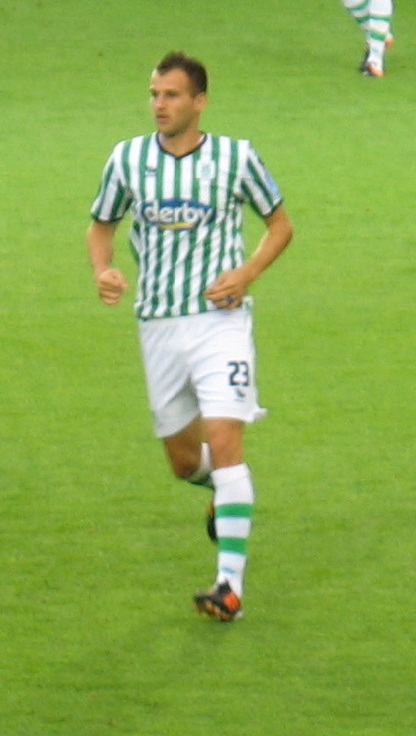
- Radujko with Olimpija Ljubljana in 2012

Personal information
- Date of birth: 17 June 1985 (age 41)
- Place of birth: Koper, SFR Yugoslavia
- Height: 1.85 m (6 ft 1 in)
- Position: Midfielder

Youth career
- Koper

Senior career*
| Years | Team | Apps | (Gls) |
| 2004–2010 | Koper | 64 | (14) |
| 2005 | → Portorož Piran (loan) | 3 | (0) |
| 2005–2009 | → Bonifika (loan) | 69 | (15) |
| 2010–2012 | Olimpija Ljubljana | 56 | (7) |
| 2012–2015 | Rudar Velenje | 91 | (11) |
| 2015–2016 | Koper | 19 | (0) |
| 2016 | Monopoli | 1 | (0) |
| 2017 | Vigontina San Paolo | 16 | (2) |
| 2017–2018 | Kras Repen | 28 | (1) |
| 2018 | SK Kühnsdorf | 15 | (18) |
| 2018–2022 | Kras Repen | 47 | (4) |
| 2021 | → Cjarlins Muzane (loan) | 4 | (0) |
| 2022–2023 | SC Kriens | 2 | (0) |
- * Club domestic league appearances and goals as of 5 January 2024

Dalibor Radujko (born 17 June 1985) is a Slovenian footballer who most recently played as a midfielder for Swiss club SC Kriens.

== Club career ==
Radujko made his Olimpija Ljubljana debut in September 2010. He joined SC Kriens from Italian side Kras Repen in 2022.

== Honours ==
Koper

- Slovenian PrvaLiga: 2009–10
