= Mitja Lotrič =

Slovenian footballer

Personal information
- Date of birth: 3 September 1994 (age 32)
- Place of birth: Slovenia
- Height: 1.68 m (5 ft 6 in)
- Position: Attacking midfielder

Team information
- Current team: FC Hermagor
- Number: 11

Youth career
- 2004–2007: Puconci
- 2007–2012: Mura 05

Senior career*
Years	Team	Apps	(Gls)
2010–2012	Mura 05	44	(4)
2012–2016	Koper	74	(14)
2013	→ Jadran Dekani (loan)	2	(0)
2016–2017	Rudar Velenje	33	(3)
2017	Pafos	4	(0)
2018–2020	Celje	78	(28)
2020–2022	Würzburger Kickers	24	(2)
2021–2022	→ Mura (loan)	21	(3)
2022	Bnei Sakhnin	0	(0)
2023	SV Allerheiligen	8	(1)
2023–	FC Hermagor	0	(0)

International career
2009–2010	Slovenia U16	3	(0)
2010	Slovenia U17	7	(1)
2011	Slovenia U18	4	(0)
2011–2012	Slovenia U19	10	(2)
2012	Slovenia U20	1	(0)
2014–2016	Slovenia U21	6	(3)
2017	Slovenia B	1	(0)
- * Club domestic league appearances and goals as of 15 December 2023

Mitja Lotrič (born 3 September 1994) is a Slovenian footballer who plays as a midfielder for FC Hermagor.

== Honours ==
Koper

- Slovenian Football Cup: 2014–15
- Slovenian Supercup: 2015

Celje

- Slovenian PrvaLiga: 2019–20

Individual

- Slovenian PrvaLiga Player of the Year: 2019–20
- Slovenian PrvaLiga Team of the Year: 2019–20
