= Matej Pučko =

Slovenian footballer

Personal information
- Date of birth: 6 October 1993 (age 33)
- Place of birth: Murska Sobota, Slovenia
- Height: 1.76 m (5 ft 9 in)
- Position: Winger

Team information
- Current team: TuS Heiligenkreuz
- Number: 10

Youth career
- Veržej
- –2008: Mura 05
- 2008–2010: Aluminij

Senior career*
Years	Team	Apps	(Gls)
2010–2011	Aluminij	22	(5)
2011–2017	Koper	168	(28)
2015–2016	→ Osasuna (loan)	33	(4)
2017–2018	Oviedo	5	(0)
2018–2020	Korona Kielce	57	(6)
2019	Korona Kielce II	2	(2)
2020–2021	Tuzlaspor	34	(5)
2021–2022	Bandırmaspor	19	(1)
2023–	TuS Heiligenkreuz	35	(8)

International career
2008	Slovenia U15	1	(0)
2009	Slovenia U16	2	(0)
2010	Slovenia U18	2	(0)
2011–2012	Slovenia U19	15	(3)
2011–2013	Slovenia U20	3	(0)
2013–2014	Slovenia U21	13	(2)
2017	Slovenia B	2	(0)
- * Club domestic league appearances and goals as of 6 October 2024

Matej Pučko (born 6 October 1993) is a Slovenian professional footballer who plays as a winger for Austrian club TuS Heiligenkreuz.

== Honours ==
Koper

- Slovenian Cup: 2014–15
- Slovenian Supercup: 2015
