= Nejc Križaj =

Slovenian footballer

Personal information
- Full name: Nejc Križaj
- Date of birth: 26 September 1989 (age 37)
- Position: Midfielder

Youth career
- 2003–2008: Britof

Senior career*
Years	Team	Apps	(Gls)
2008–2009	Triglav Kranj	2	(0)
2008–2009	→ Sava Kranj (loan)	23	(4)
2009–2010	Zarica Kranj	22	(2)
2010–2013	Šenčur	34	(3)
2013–2015	Triglav Kranj	37	(4)
2015–2016	Kranj	16	(2)
2016–2019	Triglav Kranj	29	(5)
2019–2020	Bled	10	(0)
2020–2021	Sava Kranj	4	(0)
- * Club domestic league appearances and goals as of 10 December 2023

Nejc Križaj (born 26 September 1989) is a Slovenian retired football midfielder who last played for Sava Kranj.
