= Jefthon =

Brazilian footballer

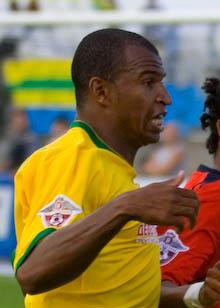
- Jefthon in Kuban Krasnodar colours

Personal information
- Full name: Jefthon Ferreira de Sena
- Date of birth: 3 January 1982 (age 44)
- Place of birth: Itabuna, Brazil
- Height: 1.82 m (5 ft 11 1/2 in)
- Position: Defender

Youth career
- –2001: PSTC

Senior career*
Years	Team	Apps	(Gls)
2001	Paraná Clube		
2002–2003	SFC Opava	24	(2)
2003–2004	Posušje		
2004–2007	Kuban Krasnodar	49	(0)
2005	→ Amur Blagoveschensk (loan)	12	(1)
2006	→ Spartak Nalchik (loan)	13	(0)
2008–2009	Rubin Kazan	2	(0)
2009–2011	Zagreb	40	(2)
2011–2012	Široki Brijeg	10	(0)
2013	Alagoinhas	4	(0)
2014	Itabuna	5	(0)
2015	Inter Zaprešić	22	(0)
2016	Koper	9	(0)
2017	Mladost Luka	5	(0)
- * Club domestic league appearances and goals

Jefthon Ferreira de Sena (born 3 January 1982), known as just Jefthon, is a Brazilian former football defender.

== Career ==
A left-back, Jefthon has previously played for SFC Opava, Posušje, Kuban Krasnodar, Amur Blagoveschensk, Spartak Nalchik. He signed for the Croatian club Zagreb in September 2009 and played in the 2009–10 and 2010–11 seasons in the Prva HNL. In summer 2011 he moved to Široki Brijeg playing in the Bosnian Premier League, where he played for a season before returning to Brazil. Back in his home country he played for Alagoinhas Atlético Clube before moving on to Itabuna.
