= Enis Đurković =

Slovenian footballer

Personal information
- Date of birth: 24 May 1989 (age 37)
- Place of birth: Kranj, SFR Yugoslavia
- Height: 1.85 m (6 ft 1 in)
- Position: Forward

Team information
- Current team: SC Reichenau/Falkert
- Number: 10

Youth career
- Zarica Kranj
- –2006: Triglav Kranj
- 2006–2007: Sava Kranj
- 2007–2008: Triglav Kranj

Senior career*
Years	Team	Apps	(Gls)
2008–2013	Triglav Kranj	66	(16)
2008–2009	→ Sava Kranj (loan)	23	(12)
2009–2010	→ Lesce (loan)	16	(4)
2010–2011	→ Zarica Kranj (loan)	20	(8)
2013–2015	Olimpija Ljubljana	17	(2)
2015	→ Radomlje (loan)	14	(2)
2015	→ Celje (loan)	14	(2)
2016	Krško	13	(2)
2016–2017	Triglav Kranj	18	(5)
2017–2018	Pandurii Târgu Jiu	10	(0)
2018	SAK Klagenfurt	13	(8)
2018	SK Kühnsdorf	15	(20)
2019	GSC Liebenfels	27	(16)
2020-	SC Reichenau/Falkert	54	(47)
- * Club domestic league appearances and goals as of 30 September 2023

Enis Đurković (born 24 May 1989) is a Slovenian professional footballer who plays as a forward for Austrian side SC Reichenau/Falkert.

== Club career ==
Đurković started his career with Zarica Kranj from his hometown. As a youngster he moved to another Kranj-based team, Triglav Kranj. In 2012–13, he won the best striker award in the Slovenian PrvaLiga alongside Nikola Nikezić and Marcos Tavares. In summer 2013 it was announced that Đurković signed a contract with Olimpija Ljubljana. In January 2015, Đurković signed a loan deal with Radomlje until the end of the 2014–15 season.
