= Ivor Horvat =

Croatian footballer

Personal information
- Date of birth: 19 August 1991 (age 35)
- Place of birth: Zagreb, Croatia
- Height: 1.81 m (5 ft 11 1/2 in)
- Position: Right back

Team information
- Current team: ASK Köflach
- Number: 25

Youth career
- –2009: Dinamo Zagreb

Senior career*
Years	Team	Apps	(Gls)
2010–2011	Lokomotiva	27	(0)
2012–2015	Istra 1961	24	(1)
2015	Lučko	18	(1)
2016–2017	Koper	33	(1)
2017–2018	Puskás Akadémia	1	(0)
2017–2018	→ Csákvári (loan)	19	(0)
2019	Radomlje	13	(1)
2019–2020	Tabor Sežana	18	(0)
2020–2021	Horn	11	(0)
2021	Vukovar'91		
2021	Varaždin	1	(0)
2022	Jarun	4	(0)
2022-	ASK Köflach	1	(0)
2025-	Global MMK	2	(1)

International career
2005	Croatia U14	2	(0)
2006–2007	Croatia U16	12	(1)
2008	Croatia U17	5	(0)
2009	Croatia U18	4	(0)
2009–2010	Croatia U19	9	(0)
2010	Croatia U20	1	(0)
2013	Croatia U21	1	(0)
- * Club domestic league appearances and goals as of 30 July 2022

Ivor Horvat (born 19 August 1991) is a Croatian football right back who plays for Austrian club ASK Köflach.

== Club career ==
On 10 August 2020, he signed with Austrian club SV Horn.
