= Matic Seferović =

Slovenian footballer

Personal information
- Full name: Matic Seferović
- Date of birth: 22 December 1986 (age 39)
- Place of birth: Ljubljana, SFR Yugoslavia
- Height: 1.78 m (5 ft 10 in)
- Position: Midfielder

Youth career
- 2004-2005: Domžale

Senior career*
Years	Team	Apps	(Gls)
2005–2007	Ihan	44	(6)
2007–2008	Livar	0	(0)
2008–2009	Radomlje	47	(10)
2010–2011	Domžale	23	(0)
2011–2014	Radomlje	85	(14)
2017–2018	Ihan		
- * Club domestic league appearances and goals

Matic Seferović (born 22 December 1986) is a football midfielder from Slovenia.
