= Marko Krivičić =

Slovenian footballer (born 1996)

Personal information
- Date of birth: 1 February 1996 (age 30)
- Place of birth: Slovenia
- Position: Midfielder

Team information
- Current team: Flamurtari

Senior career*
Years	Team	Apps	(Gls)
2014–2017	Koper	35	(0)
2016	→ Bologna (loan)	0	(0)
2017–2018	Dekani	21	(5)
2018–2022	Tabor Sežana	93	(9)
2022–2023	Erzeni	33	(0)
2023–	Flamurtari	24	(0)
- * Club domestic league appearances and goals

Marko Krivičić (born 1 February 1996) is a Slovenian footballer who played as a midfielder for Flamurtari.

== Early life ==
He was born in 1996 in Slovenia. He is a native of Koper, Slovenia.

== Career ==
He started his career with Slovenian side Koper. He helped the club win the 2015 Slovenian Football Cup. In 2016, he was sent on loan to Italian Serie A side Bologna. In 2017, he signed for Slovenian side Dekani. In 2018, he signed for Slovenian side Tabor Sežana. In 2022, he signed for Albanian side Erzeni. In 2023, he signed for Albanian side Flamurtari.

== Style of play ==
He mainly operates as a midfielder. He was described as "can also adapt well as a central defender".
