= Rubén Belima =

Equatoguinean footballer (born 1992)

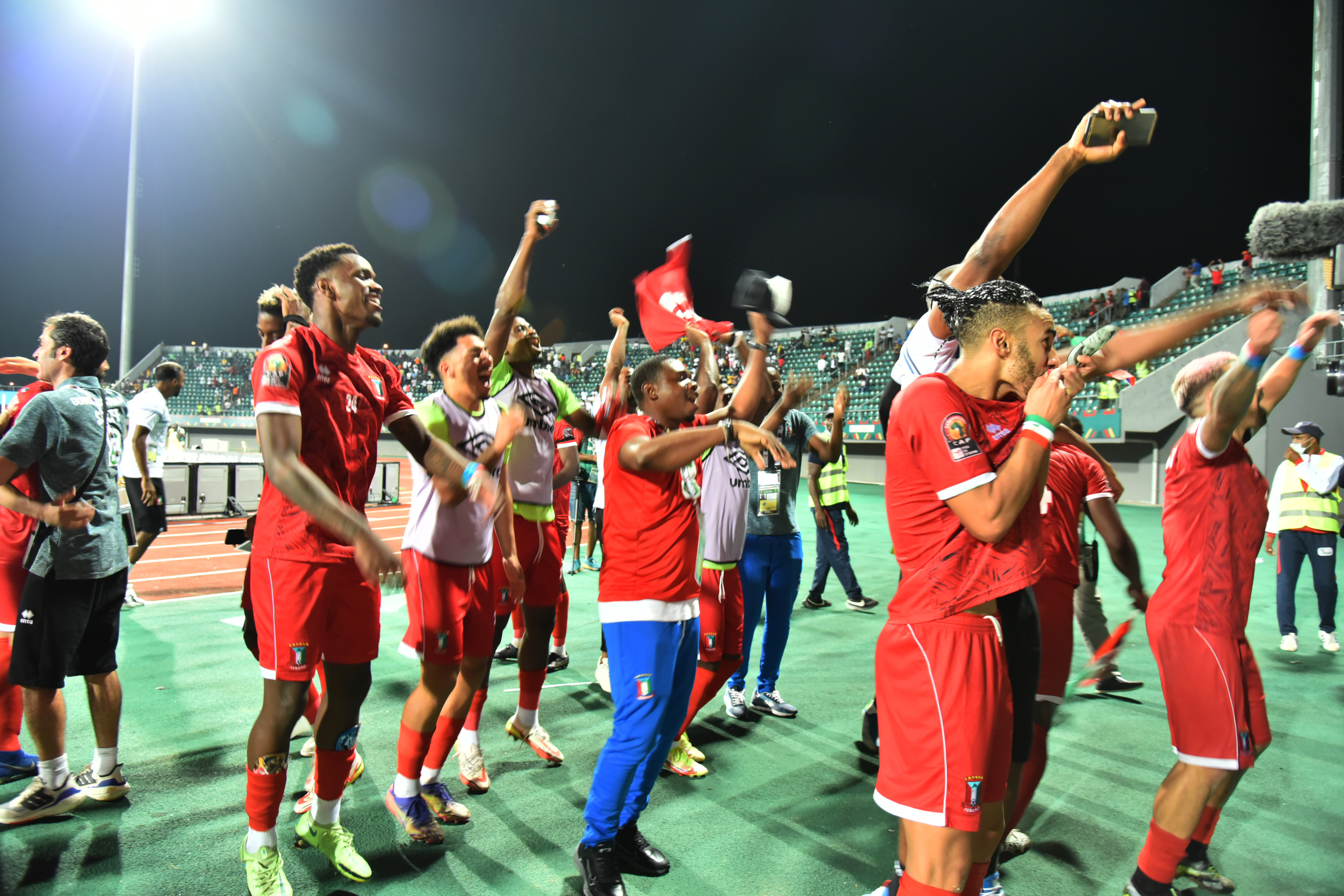
- Belima with Equatorial Guinea in 2022

Personal information
- Full name: Rubén Belima Rodríguez
- Date of birth: 11 February 1992 (age 34)
- Place of birth: Móstoles, Spain
- Height: 1.77 m (5 ft 10 in)
- Position: Left winger

Youth career
- 1999–2010: Torrevieja
- 2010–2011: Real Madrid

Senior career*
Years	Team	Apps	(Gls)
2009–2010	Torrevieja	8	(0)
2011–2013	Real Madrid C	47	(5)
2013–2015	Real Madrid B	3	(0)
2016–2017	Koper	33	(6)
2017–2018	Leixões	20	(3)
2018	Domžale	5	(0)
2019	Estoril	22	(1)
2021	SD Logroñés	3	(0)
2021–2022	Hércules	6	(0)
2022	Móstoles URJC	4	(0)
2022	Rio Maior	6	(0)
2023	Torrellano	3	(0)
Total		160	(15)

International career^{‡}
2013–2022	Equatorial Guinea	30	(0)
- * Club domestic league appearances and goals as of 7 October 2023. ‡ National team caps and goals as of 6 June 2022

Rubén Belima Rodríguez (born 11 February 1992) is a former professional footballer who played as a left winger. Born in Spain to an Equatoguinean father, he capped for the Equatorial Guinea national team.

== Club career ==
Belima was born in Móstoles, Community of Madrid, Spain. He began his career with FC Torrevieja before joining the youth ranks of Real Madrid, and making his way into their C-team. He made his professional debut with the reserve team in Segunda División on 4 May 2014, as an 85th-minute substitute for Burgui in a 1–1 home draw with fellow strugglers Real Jaén CF.

After 18 months in Slovenia with FC Koper, Belima returned to the Iberian Peninsula on 31 July 2017, signing for Leixões S.C. of Portugal's LigaPro for one year with the option of a second. He scored four times in 24 games for the club from Matosinhos – including the only one of a home victory over F.C. Paços de Ferreira in the Taça da Liga groups on 20 September – before making the journey back to the previous country to NK Domžale.

On 28 January 2019 Belima was back in Portugal's second tier, with G.D. Estoril Praia. He scored once in the remainder of the season, albeit in the 4–2 loss at Penafiel that ended the team's hope of promotion to the Primeira Liga.

== International career ==
Belima made his international debut for Equatorial Guinea on 16 November 2013 in a friendly against his birth country Spain in Malabo; he was a last-minute substitute for Juvenal Edjogo Owono in the 2–1 loss. The game was however stricken from the FIFA records as the host team had not given sufficient notice that the referee would be a compatriot.

Equatorial Guinea were given the hosting rights to the 2015 Africa Cup of Nations when Morocco withdrew due to the Ebola virus epidemic, and Belima was named in their squad. He was a substitute in the opening match against the Congo and the quarter-final, before starting the semi-final and play-off as the team came fourth.
