= Denis Halilović =

Slovenian footballer

Personal information
- Date of birth: 2 March 1986 (age 40)
- Place of birth: Slovenj Gradec, SFR Yugoslavia
- Height: 1.88 m (6 ft 2 in)
- Position: Centre-back

Youth career
- Šoštanj
- –2004: Rudar Velenje

Senior career*
Years	Team	Apps	(Gls)
2003–2006	Rudar Velenje	53	(6)
2006–2008	Celje	26	(2)
2008–2009	Drava Ptuj	18	(2)
2009–2011	Saturn Moskovskaya Oblast	9	(2)
2010–2011	→ Willem II (loan)	16	(1)
2011	CSKA Sofia	2	(0)
2012–2013	Domžale	23	(2)
2013–2015	Koper	56	(4)
2016	Yokohama FC	6	(0)
2016–2017	Domžale	11	(2)
2018	Austria Klagenfurt	12	(0)
2018–2019	Fužinar	25	(1)
2019–2020	Šmartno 1928	9	(4)

International career
2004–2007	Slovenia U20	3	(0)
2006	Slovenia U21	1	(0)
- * Club domestic league appearances and goals

Denis Halilović (born 2 March 1986) is a Slovenian retired footballer who played as a centre-back.
