= Leo Ejup =

Slovenian footballer

Personal information
- Date of birth: 9 September 1994 (age 32)
- Place of birth: Novo Mesto, Slovenia
- Position: Centre-back

Team information
- Current team: SAK Klagenfurt
- Number: 22

Youth career
- –2013: Krka

Senior career*
Years	Team	Apps	(Gls)
2013–2016	Krka	54	(5)
2013	→ Bela Krajina (loan)	9	(0)
2016–2019	Olimpija Ljubljana	0	(0)
2017	→ Radomlje (loan)	9	(0)
2017–2018	→ Krško (loan)	27	(4)
2018–2019	→ Krško (loan)	9	(0)
2019–2020	Rudar Velenje	4	(1)
2020–2023	Krka	59	(1)
2023–	SAK Klagenfurt	11	(1)

International career
2015–2016	Slovenia U21	11	(0)
- * Club domestic league appearances and goals as of 7 October 2023

Leo Ejup (born 9 September 1994) is a Slovenian footballer who plays as a defender for SAK Klagenfurt.
