= Miha Gregorič =

Slovenian footballer

Personal information
- Full name: Miha Gregorič
- Date of birth: 22 August 1989 (age 37)
- Place of birth: Šempeter pri Gorici, SFR Yugoslavia
- Position: Defender

Team information
- Current team: ASD Azzurra Premariacco 1963

Youth career
- Gorica

Senior career*
Years	Team	Apps	(Gls)
2008–2013	Gorica	81	(2)
2008–2009	→ Brda (loan)	25	(1)
2013–2015	Koper	46	(2)
2015–2018	Gorica	70	(3)
2018–2019	Fidelis Andria	23	(0)
2019–2020	Cjarlins Muzane	0	(0)
2020-2022	Gemonese 1919		
2021	→ Pro Gorizia (loan)	6	(0)
2022-2023	Pro Gorizia		
2023-	Azzurra Premariacco		(1)

International career
2007	Slovenia U18	7	(0)
- * Club domestic league appearances and goals as of 20:03, 20 November 2019 (UTC)

Miha Gregorič (born 22 August 1989) is a Slovenian footballer who plays for ASD Azzurra Premariacco 1963.

== Career ==
In September 2018, Gregorič moved abroad and joined Italian club Fidelis Andria. In July 2019, he joined another Serie D club, ASD Cjarlins Muzane. He then had spells with other Italian lower league sides.
