= Ivica Guberac =

Slovenian footballer

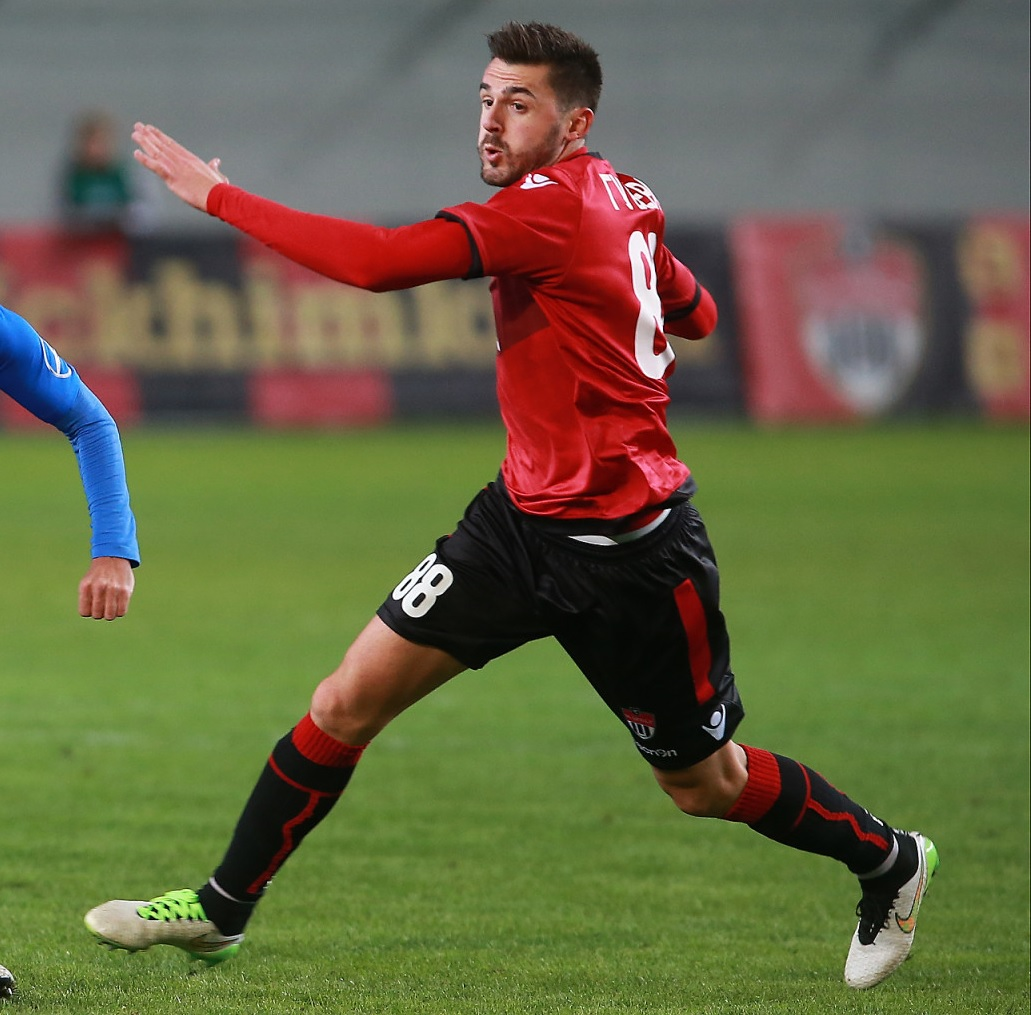
- Guberac with Khimki in 2016

Personal information
- Date of birth: 5 July 1988 (age 38)
- Place of birth: Koper, SFR Yugoslavia
- Height: 1.83 m (6 ft 0 in)
- Position: Midfielder

Youth career
- –2007: Koper

Senior career*
Years	Team	Apps	(Gls)
2005–2007	Koper	4	(2)
2007	→ Jadran Dekani (loan)	1	(0)
2007	Primorje	10	(0)
2008	Cagliari	0	(0)
2008–2015	Koper	179	(14)
2016	Aris Limassol	10	(0)
2016	Khimki	8	(0)
2017	Borac Banja Luka	13	(0)
2018–2019	Floriana	2	(0)
2019–2022	Koper	64	(13)
Total		291	(29)

International career
2008	Slovenia U20	1	(0)

Managerial career
- 2025: Koper (interim)
- * Club domestic league appearances and goals

Ivica Guberac (born 5 July 1988) is a Slovenian retired footballer who played as a midfielder.
