= Patrik Posavac =

Slovenian footballer

Personal information
- Full name: Patrik Posavac
- Date of birth: 14 March 1995 (age 31)
- Place of birth: Slovenia
- Position: Midfielder

Youth career
- –2014: Koper

Senior career*
Years	Team	Apps	(Gls)
2014–2017	Koper	33	(0)
2014	→ Jadran Dekani (loan)	12	(2)
- * Club domestic league appearances and goals as of 1 June 2017

Patrik Posavac (born 14 March 1995) is a football player from Slovenia who plays as a midfielder.
