= 2015 Slovenian Supercup =

- Event: 2015 Slovenian Supercup
| Koper | Maribor |
| 0 | 0 |
- Koper won 3–2 on penalties
- Date: 5 July 2015
- Venue: Bonifika Stadium, Koper, Slovenia
- Referee: Dejan Balažič
- Attendance: 2,500

The 2015 Slovenian Supercup, known as Superpokal Telekom Slovenije 2015 due to sponsorship reasons, was the eleventh edition of the Slovenian Supercup, an annual football match contested by the winners of the previous season's Slovenian PrvaLiga and Slovenian Cup competitions. The match was played on 5 July 2015 at the Bonifika Stadium in Koper between the 2014–15 Slovenian Cup winners Koper and the 2014–15 Slovenian PrvaLiga winners Maribor.

== Match details ==
5 July 2015
20:00 CEST

| Koper | 0–0 | Maribor |
|---|---|---|
| | Report |
Penalties
| Hadžić (penalty scored); Lotrič (penalty missed); Črnigoj (penalty scored); Krivičić (penalty missed); Galešić (penalty missed); Palčič (penalty scored) | 3–2 | (penalty scored) Volaš; (penalty scored) Tavares; (penalty missed) Vršič; (penalty missed) Ibraimi; (penalty missed) Mertelj; (penalty missed) Rajčević |

Bonifika Stadium, Koper
Attendance: 2,500
Referee: Dejan Balažič

| Koper | Maribor |

Slovenian Supercup
2015 Winners
Koper
2nd title

== See also ==
- 2015–16 Slovenian PrvaLiga
- 2015–16 Slovenian Cup
