= Bonifika Stadium =

Football stadium in Koper, Slovenia

Bonifika
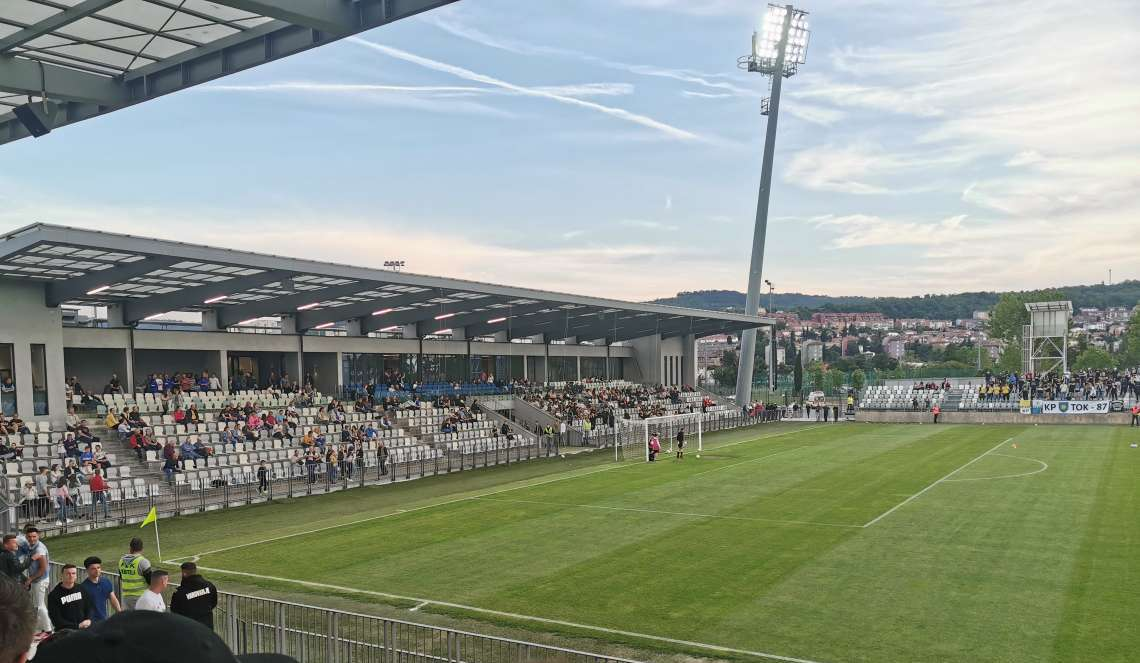
- Bonifika in 2019
- Interactive map of Bonifika
- Full name: Nogometni stadion Bonifika
- Location: Koper, Slovenia
- Coordinates: 45°32′32″N 13°43′49″E
- Owner: Municipality of Koper
- Operator: Sport Koper
- Capacity: 4,047
- Record attendance: 10,500 (Koper–Olimpija, 22 March 1987)
- Field size: 105 by 68 metres (115 by 74 yards)

Construction
- Built: 1948
- Renovated: 1962, 1996, 2010
- Expanded: 1985, 1986
- Cost: €9 million (2010 reconstruction)

Tenants
- Koper (1948–present); Ankaran (2017, 2019)

Bonifika Stadium (Slovene: Stadion Bonifika) is a multi-purpose stadium in Koper, Slovenia. It is used mostly for football matches and is the home ground of FC Koper. The stadium is part of Bonifika sports complex, together with a smaller athletics stadium, indoor hall and an indoor swimming pool. The stadium was built in 1948 and got its name from the city area where it is situated. In 2010 the stadium underwent a major reconstruction and its current capacity is 4,047 seats.

== National team matches ==
Date	Competition	Slovenia vs.	Result	Attendance
28 February 2001	Friendly	Uruguay	0–2	4,000
17 November 2010	Friendly	Georgia	1–2	4,100
29 February 2012	Friendly	Scotland	1–1	3,983
23 March 2016	Friendly	Macedonia	1–0	3,000
4 June 2021	Friendly	Gibraltar	6–0	1,035

== Other events ==
- A concert of the Canadian rock singer Bryan Adams – 7 July 1996.

== See also ==
- List of football stadiums in Slovenia
