= Slovenian Football Cup =

- Founded: 1991; 35 years ago
- Region: Slovenia
- Qualifier for: UEFA Europa League
- Current champions: Aluminij (1st title)
- Most championships: Maribor (9 titles)
- Website: nzs.si
- 2026–27 Slovenian Football Cup

The Slovenian Football Cup (Slovene: Pokal Nogometne zveze Slovenije, pronounced [pɔˈkáːl nɔɡɔˈméːtnɛ ˈzʋéːzɛ slɔˈʋèːnijɛ]) is the top knockout tournament of Slovenian football and the second most important football competition in Slovenia after the Slovenian PrvaLiga championship. The cup was established in 1991 following the breakup of Yugoslavia. Since 2020, it has been known as Pokal Pivovarna Union after its headline sponsor, the Union Brewery. Between 2004 and 2012, the competition was named Pokal Hervis due to sponsorship reasons.

As of 2026, a total of 19 clubs have reached the cup final, with 13 of them winning the title; the most successful side in the history of the competition is Maribor, who have triumphed 9 times in their 15 cup final appearances. They are followed by Olimpija (1945), Koper, and Olimpija (2005), who won four titles each. Primorje hold the record for most appearances in the final without winning the title, finishing as runners-up in three consecutive finals between 1996 and 1998. Aluminij, Nafta 1903, Gorica and Brinje Grosuplje are the only clubs from outside the top flight which managed to reach the cup final, having finished as runners-up in 2002, 2020, 2024 and 2026, respectively.

Aluminij are the current champions, having beaten Brinje Grosuplje 1–0 in the 2026 final for their first title.

== Format ==
Until 2021, the Slovenian Cup was contested by a total of 28 clubs: 18 lower league sides that qualified via regional cups organised by the Intercommunal Football Associations, and 10 teams that competed in the Slovenian PrvaLiga the previous season. In the first round proper, 18 lower league clubs were joined by the six lower placed top flight clubs. The twelve winners were then joined by the best four top flight clubs who automatically entered the second round proper. The games were played in a single leg knock-out format until the quarter-finals and semi-finals, when home and away matches were played and the aggregate score was taken into account.

From the 2022–23 season onwards, the number of teams in the first round has increased from 24 to 120, and any registered team in the country can participate in the preliminary rounds. Four teams that represent Slovenia in UEFA competitions joins the competition in the second round. Only one match is played in all rounds, with extra time and penalty shoot-out if necessary. The draw is no longer delegated with seeded and unseeded teams. Up to and including the round of 32, if two clubs from different leagues are drawn as opponents, the lower league team automatically plays at home, unless it decides not to.

Since 2005, the final is held as a single-legged match, although it was a two-legged affair in the period between 1994 and 2004.

== List of finals ==
Key

	Match won after extra time
	Match decided by a penalty shoot-out after extra time
	Match decided on aggregate score in a two-legged tie
Italic	Team from outside the top flight

Season	Winners	Score	Runners-up	Venue	Attendance
1991–92	Maribor	0–0 (a.e.t.) (4–3 pen.)	Olimpija	Bežigrad	2,000
1992–93	Olimpija	2–1	Celje	Skalna Klet	2,500
1993–94	Maribor	3–2 (agg.)	Mura	Two-legged final	
1994–95	Mura	2–1 (agg.)	Celje	Two-legged final	
1995–96	Olimpija	2–1 (agg.)	Primorje	Two-legged final	
1996–97	Maribor	3–0 (agg.)	Primorje	Two-legged final	
1997–98	Rudar Velenje	4–2 (agg.)	Primorje	Two-legged final	
1998–99	Maribor	5–2 (agg.)	Olimpija	Two-legged final	
1999–2000	Olimpija	3–2 (agg.)	Korotan Prevalje	Two-legged final	
2000–01	Gorica	4–3 (agg.)	Olimpija	Two-legged final	
2001–02	Gorica	6–1 (agg.)	Aluminij	Two-legged final	
2002–03	Olimpija	3–3 (agg.) (a)	Celje	Two-legged final	
2003–04	Maribor	7–4 (agg.)	Dravograd	Two-legged final	
2004–05	Celje	1–0	Gorica	Arena Petrol	3,800
2005–06	Koper	1–1 (a.e.t.) (5–3 pen.)	Celje	Arena Petrol	3,200
2006–07	Koper	1–0	Maribor	Arena Petrol	3,500
2007–08	Interblock	2–1	Maribor	Arena Petrol	5,400
2008–09	Interblock	2–1	Koper	Ljudski vrt	2,500
2009–10	Maribor	3–2 (a.e.t.)	Domžale	Ljudski vrt	6,000
2010–11	Domžale	4–3	Maribor	Stožice	6,000
2011–12	Maribor	2–2 (a.e.t.) (3–2 pen.)	Celje	Stožice	4,132
2012–13	Maribor	1–0	Celje	Bonifika	1,500
2013–14	Gorica	2–0	Maribor	Bonifika	3,500
2014–15	Koper	2–0	Celje	Bonifika	3,000
2015–16	Maribor	2–2 (a.e.t.) (7–6 pen.)	Celje	Bonifika	2,500
2016–17	Domžale	1–0	Olimpija Ljubljana	Bonifika	3,230
2017–18	Olimpija Ljubljana	6–1	Aluminij	Stožice	8,804
2018–19	Olimpija Ljubljana	2–1	Maribor	Stadion Z'dežele	8,623
2019–20	Mura	2–0	Nafta 1903	NNC Brdo	200
2020–21	Olimpija Ljubljana	2–1	Celje	Bonifika	1,200
2021–22	Koper	3–1	Bravo	Stadion Z'dežele	3,200
2022–23	Olimpija Ljubljana	2–1 (a.e.t.)	Maribor	Stadion Z'dežele	9,217
2023–24	Rogaška	1–1 (a.e.t.) (6–5 pen.)	Gorica	Stožice	4,042
2024–25	Celje	4–0	Koper	Stožice	6,108
2025–26	Aluminij	1–0	Brinje Grosuplje	Stadion Z'dežele	3,892

== List of winners ==
Teams shown in italics are no longer in existence.

Club	Winners	Last final won	Runners-up	Last final lost
Maribor	9	2016	6	2023
Olimpija (Note: The original Olimpija went bankrupt and folded in 2005. In the same year, NK Bežigrad was founded. In 2008, the club renamed as Olimpija Ljubljana. Legally, the original and the new club are two separate entities.)	4	2003	3	2001
Koper	4	2022	2	2025
Olimpija Ljubljana	4	2023	1	2017
Gorica	3	2014	2	2024
Celje	2	2025	9	2021
Domžale	2	2017	1	2010
Interblock	2	2009	0	—
Aluminij	1	2026	2	2018
NK Mura (Note: The original Mura went bankrupt and folded in 2005. Legally, the original and the new club are two separate entities.)	1	1995	1	1994
Rudar Velenje	1	1998	0	—
NŠ Mura	1	2020	0	—
Rogaška	1	2024	0	—
Primorje	0	—	3	1998
Korotan Prevalje	0	—	1	2000
Dravograd	0	—	1	2004
Nafta 1903	0	—	1	2020
Bravo	0	—	1	2022
Brinje Grosuplje	0	—	1	2026
