= 2013–14 NK Olimpija Ljubljana season =

Olimpija
2013–14 season
- President: Izet Rastoder
- Head Coach: Andrej Razdrh (until 21 October 2013); Milorad Kosanović (21 October 2013 – 30 April 2014); Darko Karapetrovič (since 30 April 2014)
- Home stadium: Stožice Stadium
- PrvaLiga: 7th
- Cup: Semi-finals
- Supercup: Runners-up
- Europa League: 2nd qualifying round
- Top goalscorer: League: Omladič (10); All: Omladič (10)
- Highest home attendance: 5,000 (v. Maribor); 2 March 2014
- Lowest home attendance: 0 (v. Triglav); 29 March 2014
- Average home league attendance: 922
| Home colours | Away colours |

The 2013–14 season was Olimpija's fifth season in the PrvaLiga and ninth season after the dissolution of the old NK Olimpija. Olimpija participated in the PrvaLiga, Slovenian Cup, Slovenian Supercup and the Europa League.

== Transfers ==
In:

Note: Flags indicate national team as defined under FIFA eligibility rules; some limited exceptions apply. Players may hold more than one non-FIFA nationality.

| No. | Pos. | Nation | Player |
|---|---|---|---|
| 2 | MF | SRB | Miroljub Kostić (free agent) |
| 4 | MF | CMR | Junior Etémé Mbatama (from Sochaux B) |
| 7 | FW | BRA | Franklin Vicente (from Celje) |
| 9 | FW | SVN | Enis Đurković (from Triglav Kranj) |
| 13 | DF | SVN | Milan Anđelković (from free agent) |
| 13 | DF | SVN | Matija Škarabot (from Rijeka) |
| 15 | MF | MNE | Marko Vukčević (from Budućnost) |
| 18 | FW | MNE | Nikola Nikezić (free agent) |
| 19 | MF | SVN | Marko Zalaznik (from Radomlje) |
| 25 | DF | CRO | Davor Bagarić (from Koper) |
| 27 | DF | SVN | Tadej Apatič (free agent) |
| 27 | FW | SVN | Aleksandar Rodić (from Chengdu Blades) |
| 34 | MF | SVN | Aleksandar Radosavljević (free agent) |
| 40 | MF | BIH | Zajko Zeba (from Split) |
| – | FW | SVN | Luka Gajič (from Interblock) |

Out: Note: Flags indicate national team as defined under FIFA eligibility rules; some limited exceptions apply. Players may hold more than one non-FIFA nationality.

| No. | Pos. | Nation | Player |
|---|---|---|---|
| 2 | DF | SVN | Denis Lidjan |
| 3 | DF | SVN | Mitja Kovačević (to Aluminij) |
| 4 | DF | SVN | Dejan Gerić (to Kamnik) |
| 4 | MF | CMR | Junior Etémé Mbatama (Contract terminated in 2014) |
| 7 | FW | BRA | Franklin Vicente (to Celje) (Loaned out in 2013) |
| 7 | FW | BRA | Franklin Vicente (Contract terminated in 2014) |
| 13 | DF | SVN | Milan Anđelković (to Ethnikos Achna) |
| 15 | FW | SVN | Adnan Bešić (loan to Krka) |
| 18 | FW | MNE | Nikola Nikezić |
| 19 | MF | SRB | Đorđe Ivelja |
| 25 | DF | CRO | Davor Bagarić |
| 25 | MF | SVN | Anej Lovrečič (to Vaslui) |
| 26 | MF | SVN | Aleksander Topić (loan to Ivančna Gorica) |
| 27 | DF | SVN | Tadej Apatič (to Slavia Sofia) |
| 27 | FW | SVN | Marko Nunič |
| 28 | MF | SVN | Tim Čeh (loan to Bela Krajina) |
| 33 | DF | SVN | Erik Salkić |
| 34 | MF | SVN | Aleksandar Radosavljević |
| 40 | MF | BIH | Zajko Zeba |
| – | FW | SVN | Adnan Bešić (to SVG Bleiburg) |
| – | – | SVN | Aleksander Djenić (loan to Ivančna Gorica) |

== Competitions ==
=== Overall ===
| Competition | Started round | Final result | First match | Last match |
|---|---|---|---|---|
| Slovenian PrvaLiga | – | 7th | 13 July 2013 | 25 May 2014 |
| Slovenian Cup | Round of 16 | Semi-finals | 18 September 2013 | 2 April 2014 |
| Slovenian Supercup | Final | Runners-up | 7 July 2013 | 7 July 2013 |
| UEFA Europa League | QR2 | QR2 | 18 July 2013 | 25 July 2013 |

=== Supercup ===
| 7 July 2013 Final | Maribor | 3–0 | Olimpija | Celje |
| 20:00 CET | Tavares 25'; Mezga 45+1'; Cvijanović 63'; Mejač (yellow card) 85' | Report (in Slovene) | | Stadium: Arena Petrol; Attendance: 1,800; Referee: Darko Čeferin, Slovenia |

=== League ===
==== Standings ====
| Pos | Team | Pld | W | D | L | GF | GA | GD | Pts | Qualification or relegation |
|---|---|---|---|---|---|---|---|---|---|---|
| 5 | Zavrč | 36 | 16 | 5 | 15 | 58 | 63 | −5 | 53 | |
| 6 | Domžale | 36 | 10 | 15 | 11 | 47 | 36 | +11 | 45 | |
| 7 | Olimpija | 36 | 12 | 6 | 18 | 38 | 56 | −18 | 42 | |
| 8 | Celje | 36 | 10 | 7 | 19 | 30 | 58 | −28 | 37 | |
| 9 | Krka | 36 | 8 | 7 | 21 | 31 | 64 | −33 | 31 | Relegation play-offs cancelled |

Source: Slovenian PrvaLiga (in Slovene)
Rules for classification: 1) points; 2) goal difference; 3) number of goals scored.

==== Results summary and by round ====
| Overall | | | | | | | | Home | | | | | | Away | | | | | |
| Pld | W | D | L | GF | GA | GD | Pts | W | D | L | GF | GA | GD | W | D | L | GF | GA | GD |
|---|---|---|---|---|---|---|---|---|---|---|---|---|---|---|---|---|---|---|---|
| 36 | 12 | 6 | 18 | 38 | 56 | −18 | 42 | 7 | 3 | 8 | 22 | 25 | −3 | 5 | 3 | 10 | 16 | 31 | −15 |

| Round | 1 | 2 | 3 | 4 | 5 | 6 | 7 | 8 | 9 | 10 | 11 | 12 | 13 | 14 | 15 | 16 | 17 | 18 | 19 | 20 | 21 | 22 | 23 | 24 | 25 | 26 | 27 | 28 | 29 | 30 | 31 | 32 | 33 | 34 | 35 | 36 |
|---|---|---|---|---|---|---|---|---|---|---|---|---|---|---|---|---|---|---|---|---|---|---|---|---|---|---|---|---|---|---|---|---|---|---|---|---|
| Ground | H | A | H | H | A | H | A | H | A | A | H | A | A | H | A | H | A | H | H | A | H | H | A | H | A | H | A | A | H | A | A | H | A | H | A | H |
| Result | L | D | W | L | W | W | L | L | L | W | W | L | L | L | L | D | W | W | L | W | L | W | D | D | D | D | L | L | W | L | L | L | L | L | W | W |
| Position | 8 | 8 | 5 | 7 | 5 | 4 | 6 | 6 | 6 | 6 | 6 | 7 | 7 | 7 | 8 | 8 | 8 | 6 | 6 | 6 | 7 | 7 | 7 | 7 | 7 | 7 | 7 | 7 | 7 | 7 | 7 | 7 | 7 | 7 | 7 | 7 |

Updated to match(es) played on 25 May 2014. Source: Slovenian PrvaLiga (in Slovene)
A = Away; H = Home; W = Win; D = Draw; L = Loss

==== Matches ====
| 13 July 2013 1 | Olimpija | 1–2 | Rudar | Ljubljana |
| 20:00 CET | Trifković 15'; Ivelja (yellow card) 68'; Delamea Mlinar (yellow card) 90+4' | Report (in Slovene) | Kašnik 12'; Rotman (yellow card) 18'; Stjepanović (yellow card) 32'; Eterović 64' (pen.); Radujko (yellow card) 67'; Podlogar (yellow card) 86'; Jeseničnik (yellow card) 90+4'; Bubalović (yellow card) 90+4' | Stadium: Stožice; Attendance: 1,090; Referee: Roman Glažar |

| 21 July 2013 2 | Koper | 1–1 | Olimpija | Koper |
| 18:00 CET | Galešić (yellow card) 37'; Lotrič 54'; Čovilo (yellow card) 47'; Mavrič (yellow card) 54'; Krajnc (yellow card) 78'; Reja (yellow card) 90+3' | Report (in Slovene) | Etémé 34'; Trifković (yellow card) 38'; Omladič (yellow card) 65' | Stadium: Bonifika; Attendance: 800; Referee: Slavko Vinčić |

| 28 July 2013 3 | Olimpija | 5–0 | Krka | Ljubljana |
| 20:30 CET | Delamea Mlinar 7'; Omladič 19', (yellow card) 45'; Trifković 37'; Đurković 57'; Šporar 75' | Report (in Slovene) | Bešić (yellow card) 33'; Ihbeisheh (yellow card) 54'; Vučkić (yellow card) 79' | Stadium: Stožice; Attendance: 400; Referee: Matej Jug |

| 2 March 2014 4 | Olimpija | 0–3 | Maribor | Ljubljana |
| 15:00 CET | | Report (in Slovene) | Bohar 34'; Milec (yellow card) 36'; Fajić 78'; Mendy (yellow card) 70', (goal) 90+4' | Stadium: Stožice; Attendance: 5,000; Referee: Damir Skomina |

| 10 August 2013 5 | Celje | 2–3 | Olimpija | Celje |
| 17:30 CET | Gobec (yellow card) 24'; Bajde (yellow card) 60'; Jugović 74' (pen.); Verbič 87', (yellow card) 88' | Report (in Slovene) | Omladič 24' (pen.); Šporar 49'; Zeba 58', (yellow card) 89'; Bajrić (yellow card) 63'; Mitrović (yellow card) 76'; Ivelja (yellow card) 79' | Stadium: Arena Petrol; Attendance: 750; Referee: Darko Čeferin |

| 18 August 2013 6 | Olimpija | 3–1 | Triglav | Ljubljana |
| 20:30 CET | Valenčič 3'; Jović 14'; Zarifović 31'; Zeba (yellow card) 77'; Kapun (yellow card) 90' | Report (in Slovene) | Kongnyuy 60'; Bukara (yellow card) 61' | Stadium: Stožice; Attendance: 500; Referee: Miran Bukovec |

| 24 August 2013 7 | Gorica | 4–1 | Olimpija | Nova Gorica |
| 18:30 CET | Lapadula 16', (yellow card) 56'; Vetrih 30'; Coda 36'; Favalli (yellow card) 53'; Bazzoffia 82' | Report (in Slovene) | Omladič 39' (pen.); Trifković (yellow card) 59'; Jović (yellow card) 81' | Stadium: Sports Park; Attendance: 700; Referee: Bojan Mertik |

| 31 August 2013 8 | Olimpija | 0–3 | Domžale | Ljubljana |
| 17:30 CET | Bajrić (yellow card) 51'; Trifković (yellow card) 54'; Jović (yellow card) 63'; Fink (yellow card) 68'; Kapun (yellow card) 76'; Zarifović (yellow card) 79' | Report (in Slovene) | Vuk 1'; Husmani (yellow card) 17'; Đurković 22' (o.g.); Parker 45' | Stadium: Stožice; Attendance: 300; Referee: Matej Jug |

| 13 September 2013 9 | Zavrč | 2–1 | Olimpija | Zavrč |
| 20:00 CET | Benko 26'; Golubar 50'; Kurbus (yellow card) 60' | Report (in Slovene) | Fink (yellow card) 29'; Šporar 36'; Trifković (yellow card) 73'; Mitrović (yellow card) 74' | Stadium: Sports Park; Attendance: 1,000; Referee: Darko Čeferin |

| 21 September 2013 10 | Rudar | 1–2 | Olimpija | Velenje |
| 17:30 CET | Radujko 43'; Firer (yellow card) 67' | Report (in Slovene) | Omladič 55' (pen.), (yellow card) 89'; Šporar (yellow card) 73', (goal) 84'; Nikezić (yellow card) 85' | Stadium: Ob Jezeru; Attendance: 750; Referee: Damir Skomina |

| 25 September 2013 11 | Olimpija | 1–0 | Koper | Ljubljana |
| 19:00 CET | Omladič 13' (pen.); Kapun (yellow card) 40'; Nikezić (yellow card) 44'; Etémé (yellow card) 52'; Zorc (yellow card) 77'; Delamea Mlinar (yellow card) 90+1' | Report (in Slovene) | Gregorič (red card) 12'; Guberac (yellow card) 45'; Čovilo (yellow card) 67' | Stadium: Stožice; Attendance: 300; Referee: Dragoslav Perić |

| 28 September 2013 12 | Krka | 1–0 | Olimpija | Novo mesto |
| 16:00 CET | Ihbeisheh 28'; Košnik (yellow card) 53'; Ivanković (yellow card) 90+1'; Obradović (yellow card) 90+2' | Report (in Slovene) | Ivelja (yellow card) 73' | Stadium: Portoval; Attendance: 400; Referee: Slavko Vinčić |

| 6 October 2013 13 | Maribor | 2–0 | Olimpija | Maribor |
| 17:00 CET | Mendy 21', (yellow card) 36'; Rajčević (yellow card) 23'; Viler (yellow card) 63'; Bohar 66' | Report (in Slovene) | Fink (yellow card) 17'; Šporar (yellow card) 49'; Jović (yellow card) 53' | Stadium: Ljudski vrt Attendance: 6,500; Referee: Darko Čeferin |

| 19 October 2013 14 | Olimpija | 0–2 | Celje | Ljubljana |
| 20:05 CET | Radosavljević (yellow card) 57'; Valenčič (yellow card) 77'; Nikezić (yellow card) 84' | Report (in Slovene) | Bajde (yellow card) 31'; Jugović (yellow card) 40'; Jovanović (yellow card) 43'; Vrhovec 70'; Verbič (yellow card) 8', (goal) 85' | Stadium: Stožice; Attendance: 3,000; Referee: Matej Jug |

| 26 October 2013 15 | Triglav | 1–0 | Olimpija | Kranj |
| 15:00 CET | Nukić (yellow card) 26'; Kongnyuy 45'; Djukić (yellow card) 47' | Report (in Slovene) | Radosavljević (yellow card) 50'; Džafić (yellow card) 62'; Mitrović (yellow card) 70'; Apatič (yellow card) 72' | Stadium: Stanko Mlakar Stadium; Attendance: 500; Referee: Vojko Goričan |

| 2 November 2013 16 | Olimpija | 2–2 | Gorica | Ljubljana |
| 17:30 CET | Anđelkovič 55'; Vukčević (yellow card) 69'; Šporar 77' | Report (in Slovene) | Gigli (yellow card) 9'; Coda 47'; Živec (yellow card) 50'; Lapadula 82' | Stadium: Stožice; Attendance: 400; Referee: Damir Skomina |

| 9 November 2013 17 | Domžale | 1–2 | Olimpija | Domžale |
| 17:30 CET | Jelar 16'; Požeg Vancaš (yellow card) 38'; Zec (yellow card) 60'; Vuk (yellow card) 82' | Report (in Slovene) | Delamea Mlinar (yellow card) 34'; Omladič 56'; Etémé (yellow card) 70'; Vukčević 72'; Zarifović (yellow card) 85'; Šeliga (yellow card) 86'; Djermanović (yellow card) 90+1' | Stadium: Sports Park; Attendance: 400; Referee: Davor Drečnik |

| 23 November 2013 18 | Olimpija | 3–2 | Zavrč | Ljubljana |
| 17:00 CET | Djermanović 13', 17'; Ivelja (yellow card) 15'; Mitrović (yellow card) 26'; Omladič 70'; Etémé (yellow card) 85'; Šeliga (yellow card) 90+3' | (in Slovene) | Fink 35' (o.g.); Kokol (yellow card) 72'; Benko 82' | Stadium: Stožice; Attendance: 350; Referee: Bojan Mertik |

| 1 December 2013 19 | Olimpija | 0–3 | Rudar | Ljubljana |
| 16:15 CET | Radosavljević (yellow card) 45'; Etémé (yellow card) 55'; Omladič (yellow card) 90+2' | Report (in Slovene) | Eterović 18', 32'; Firer (yellow card) 60'; Podlogar 87' | Stadium: Stožice; Attendance: 400; Referee: Darko Čeferin |

| 8 December 2013 20 | Koper | 0–1 | Olimpija | Koper |
| 17:00 CET | Galešić (yellow card) 64'; Črnigoj (yellow card) 72' | Report (in Slovene) | Čeh (yellow card) 69'; Vukčević (yellow card) 82'; Anđelković 90+3' | Stadium: Bonifika; Attendance: 800; Referee: Vojko Goričan |

| 8 March 2014 21 | Olimpija | 0–1 | Krka | Ljubljana |
| 15:00 CET | Jović (yellow card) 60'; Delamea Mlinar (yellow card) 68'; Djermanović (yellow card) 85'; Omladič (yellow card) 86'; Škarabot (yellow card) 90+3'; Rodić (yellow card) 90+3' | Report (in Slovene) | Buden (yellow card) 45'; Ranić (yellow card) 55'; Marošević (yellow card) 62'; Zeljković (yellow card) 70'; Perić 90+2', (yellow card) 90+2' | Stadium: Stožice; Attendance: 50; Referee: Bojan Mertik |

| 15 March 2014 22 | Olimpija | 2–0 | Maribor | Ljubljana |
| 20:00 CET | Rodić 2', (yellow card) 35'; Fink (yellow card) 35'; Trifković 45'; Vukčević (yellow card) 50'; Djermanović (yellow card) 77, 82' (yellow-red card) | Report (in Slovene) | Arghus (yellow card) 53'; Cvijanović (yellow card) 88'; Filipović (yellow card) 90' | Stadium: Stožice; Attendance: 100; Referee: Matej Jug |

| 22 March 2014 23 | Celje | 0–0 | Olimpija | Celje |
| 15:00 CET | Korošec (yellow card) 76'; Ploj (yellow card) 86' | Report (in Slovene) | Jović (yellow card) 49'; Rodić (yellow card) 56'; Etémé (yellow card) 57' | Stadium: Arena Petrol; Attendance: 950; Referee: Slavko Vinčić |

| 29 March 2014 24 | Olimpija | 1–1 | Triglav | Ljubljana |
| 15:00 CET | Rodić 10', (yellow card) 79'; Fink (yellow card) 78' | Report (in Slovene) | Kongnyuy 19'; Djukić (yellow card) 29'; Šturm (yellow card) 51' | Stadium: Stožice; Attendance: 0 Referee: Roman Glažar |

| 5 April 2014 25 | Gorica | 0–0 | Olimpija | Nova Gorica |
| 20:05 CET | Modolo (yellow card) 35'; Lapadula (yellow card) 55' | Report (in Slovene) | Kapun (yellow card) 85' | Stadium: Sports Park; Attendance: 600; Referee: Miran Bukovec |

| 12 April 2014 26 | Olimpija | 0–0 | Domžale | Ljubljana |
| 16:30 CET | Kostić (yellow card) 25'; Bajrić (yellow card) 90+4' | Report (in Slovene) | Janža (yellow card) 22'; Zec (yellow card) 33'; Horić (yellow card) 53'; Dobrovoljc (yellow card) 84' | Stadium: Stožice; Attendance: 300; Referee: Vojko Goričan |

| 16 April 2014 27 | Zavrč | 3–1 | Olimpija | Zavrč |
| 19:30 CET | Težak (yellow card) 5, 79' (yellow-red card); Dugolin 24'; Smrekar 42', 89' | Report (in Slovene) | Omladič 26'; Kapun (yellow card) 53'; Kostić (yellow card) 73'; Škarabot (yellow card) 82' | Stadium: Sports Park; Attendance: 700; Referee: Slavko Vinčić |

| 19 April 2014 28 | Rudar | 4–0 | Olimpija | Velenje |
| 20:05 CET | Eterović 45', 70'; Radujko 55'; Podlogar 72'; Rošer (yellow card) 86' | Report (in Slovene) | Fink (yellow card) 17'; Jović (yellow card) 68'; Bajrić (red card) 80'; Djermanović (yellow card) 88' | Stadium: Ob Jezeru; Attendance: 500; Referee: Matej Jug |

| 23 April 2014 29 | Olimpija | 1–0 | Koper | Ljubljana |
| 17:30 CET | Jović 17'; Kapun (yellow card) 22'; Kostić (yellow card) 35'; Mitrović (yellow card) 57' | Report (in Slovene) | Palčič (yellow card) 35'; Žibert (yellow card) 50'; Halilović (yellow card) 77' | Stadium: Stožice; Attendance: 450; Referee: Davor Drečnik |

| 27 April 2014 30 | Krka | 1–0 | Olimpija | Novo mesto |
| 16:30 CET | Ihbeisheh (yellow card) 31'; Zeljković 52' (pen.); Dežmar (yellow card) 61'; Buden (yellow card) 71' | Report (in Slovene) | Djermanović (yellow card) 43'; Fink (red card) 50'; Škarabot (yellow card) 58' | Stadium: Portoval; Attendance: 200; Referee: Andrej Žnidaršič |

| 3 May 2014 31 | Maribor | 2–0 | Olimpija | Maribor |
| 20:05 CET | Djermanović 5' (o.g.); Cvijanović 66' (pen.) | Report (in Slovene) | Zarifović (red card) 65'; Džafić (yellow card) 72' | Stadium: Ljudski vrt Attendance: 5,500; Referee: Damir Skomina |

| 7 May 2014 32 | Olimpija | 0–1 | Celje | Ljubljana |
| 17:00 CET | Mitrović (yellow card) 12'; Vukčević (yellow card) 34'; Jović (yellow card) 68' | Report (in Slovene) | Rajsel (yellow card) 46'; Verbič 63' (pen.), (yellow card) 87'; Vrhovec (yellow card) 65'; Žitko (yellow card) 90' | Stadium: Stožice; Attendance: 250; Referee: Slavko Vinčić |

| 10 May 2014 33 | Triglav | 5–2 | Olimpija | Kranj |
| 17:00 CET | Palibrk 8', 46'; Udovič 42'; Redžić 45', 88', (yellow card) 62' | Report (in Slovene) | Valenčič 35'; Corn 77'; Mitrović (yellow card) 62' | Stadium: Stanko Mlakar Stadium; Attendance: 550; Referee: Roberto Ponis |

| 13 May 2014 34 | Olimpija | 0–2 | Gorica | Ljubljana |
| 18:00 CET | Rodić (yellow card) 78' | Report (in Slovene) | Coda 18', 59'; Berardocco (yellow card) 40'; Vetrih (yellow card) 54' | Stadium: Stožice; Attendance: 200; Referee: Vojko Goričan |

| 17 May 2014 35 | Domžale | 1–2 | Olimpija | Domžale |
| 17:00 CET | Šišić 61', (yellow card) 61, 82' (yellow-red card); Horić (yellow card) 70'; Dobrovoljc (yellow card) 87' | Report (in Slovene) | Jović (yellow card) 13'; Omladič 27'; Vukčević 90+1' | Stadium: Sports Park; Attendance: 600; Referee: Nejc Kajtazović |

| 25 May 2014 36 | Olimpija | 3–2 | Zavrč | Ljubljana |
| 17:00 CET | Vukčević 13'; Valenčič 28'; Omladič 31', (yellow card) 90+1'; Jović (yellow card) 52'; Fink (yellow card) 79'; Šeliga (yellow card) 85' | Report (in Slovene) | Sambolec (yellow card) 9'; Kurbus 62'; Kokol (yellow card) 67'; Kelenc 68' | Stadium: Stožice; Attendance: 300; Referee: Bojan Mertik |

Notes

1. The matches were played behind closed doors.

=== Cup ===
==== Round of 16 ====
| 18 September 2013 Round of 16 | Ankaran Hrvatini | 0–5 | Olimpija | Ankaran |
| 16:00 CET | Ousman (yellow card) 15'; Klun (yellow card) 48' | Report (in Slovene) | Nikezić 22', 73', (yellow card) 37'; Baskera (yellow card) 44'; Šporar 65', 78'; Vukćević 84' | Stadium: ŠRC Katarina; Attendance: 200; Referee: Andrej Žnidaršič |

==== Quarter-finals ====
| 23 October 2013 First leg | Olimpija | 2–0 | Domžale | Ljubljana |
| 17:00 CET | Baskera 22'; Šporar 37' (pen.); Ivelja (yellow card) 70' | Report (in Slovene) | Skubic (yellow card) 37'; Majer (yellow card) 54' | Stadium: Stožice; Attendance: 500; Referee: Roberto Ponis |

| 6 November 2013 Second leg | Domžale | 1–0 (1–2 agg.) | Olimpija | Domžale |
| 17:30 CET | Jelar (yellow card) 17'; Korun (yellow card) 40'; Husmani 51' | Report (in Slovene) | Omladič (yellow card) 5'; Etémé (yellow card) 67' | Stadium: Sports Park; Attendance: 600; Referee: Dejan Balažič |

==== Semi-finals ====
| 26 March 2014 First leg | Maribor | 1–0 | Olimpija | Maribor |
| 20:05 CET | Cvijanović 23'; Mendy (yellow card) 77'; Stojanović (yellow card) 84' | Report (in Slovene) | Trifković (yellow card) 22' | Stadium: Ljudski vrt Attendance: 7,000; Referee: Dragoslav Perić |

| 2 April 2014 Second leg | Olimpija | 1–1 (1–2 agg.) | Maribor | Ljubljana |
| 17:30 CET | Trifković (yellow card) 35'; Šuler 45' (o.g.); Rodić (yellow card) 63'; Kapun (yellow card) 90' | Report (in Slovene) | Mejač (yellow card) 45'; Fajić 54', (yellow card) 72' | Stadium: Stožice; Attendance: 4,000; Referee: Matej Jug |

=== Europa League ===
==== Second qualifying round ====
| 18 July 2013 First leg | Olimpija (Slovenia) | 3–1 | (Slovakia) Žilina | Ljubljana, Slovenia |
| 20:45 CET | Šporar 19'; Đurković 26'; Ivelja 90+3' | Report; Report (in Slovene) | Škvarka 82' | Stadium: Stožice Stadium; Attendance: 1,500; Referee: Kristo Tohver (Estonia) |

| 25 July 2013 Second leg | Žilina (Slovakia) | 2–0 (3–3 (a) agg.) | (Slovenia) Olimpija | Žilina, Slovakia |
| 17:30 CET | Paur 38', 55' | Report Report (in Slovene) | | Stadium: Štadión pod Dubňom; Attendance: 4,137; Referee: Jakob Kehlet (Denmark) |

== Season friendlies ==
| 15 June 2013 1 | Ivančna Gorica | 0 – 5 | Olimpija | Ivančna Gorica, Slovenia |
| 18:15 CET | | Report (in Slovene) | Đurković 30'; Zarifović 35'; Vicente 62'; Bešić 69', 72' | Stadium: Ivančna Gorica Stadium |

| 22 June 2013 2 | Olimpija (Slovenia) | 0 – 4 | (Croatia) Rijeka | Kranjska Gora, Slovenia |
| 18:55 CET | | Report (in Slovene) | Knežević 14'; Benko 29'; Kvržić 67'; Alispahić 81' | Stadium: Sports Park; Attendance: 200; Referee: David Šmajc |

| 25 June 2013 3 | Olimpija (Slovenia) | 1 – 2 | (Croatia) Dinamo | Ptuj, Slovenia |
| 18:00 CET | Šporar 72' | Report (in Slovene) | Junior 27'; Krstanović 88' (pen.) | Stadium: Ptuj City Stadium; Referee: Roman Glažar |

| 30 June 2013 4 | Olimpija (Slovenia) | 0 – 4 | (Ukraine) Metalurh | Bad Tatzmannsdorf, Austria |
| 18:00 CET | | Report (in Slovene) | Baranovskyi 4'; Dimitrov 66'; Daniel 72' (pen.), 76' | Stadium: Municipal; Attendance: 200 |

| 18 January 2014 5 | Olimpija | 1 – 1 | Jezero Medvode | Slovenia |
| 13:00 CET | Djermanović | | Janežič |

| 26 January 2014 6 | Olimpija | 6 – 0 | Ivančna Gorica | Ljubljana, Slovenia |
| | Djermanović; Zalaznik, Valenčič, | | | Stadium: Kodeljevo Sports Park (artificial turf) |

| 2 February 2014 7 | Olimpija (Slovenia) | 1 – 1 | (Croatia) Opatija | Umag, Croatia |
| 15:00 CET | Zalaznik | | | Stadium: City Stadium |

| 5 February 2014 8 | Olimpija (Slovenia) | 1 – 2 | (Serbia) Voždovac | Umag, Croatia |
| | Mitrović | | | Stadium: City Stadium |

| 14 February 2014 9 | Olimpija (Slovenia) | 1 – 0 | (Hungary) Gyirmót | Umag, Croatia |
| | Šporar | | | Stadium: City Stadium |

| 19 February 2014 10 | Radomlje | 1 – 0 | Olimpija | Radomlje, Slovenia |
| | Stojiljković | | | Stadium: Sports Park |

| 23 February 2014 11 | Olimpija | 2 – 1 | Dob | Ljubljana, Slovenia |
| 13:00 CET | Etémé; Delamea | | Leskovar | Stadium: Kodeljevo Sports Park (artificial turf) |

== See also ==
- 2013 Slovenian Supercup
- 2013–14 Slovenian PrvaLiga
- 2013–14 Slovenian Cup
- 2013–14 UEFA Europa League
