= 2012–13 Slovenian Football Cup =

Tournament details
- Country: Slovenia
- Teams: 28

Final positions
- Champions: Maribor (8th title)
- Runners-up: Celje

Tournament statistics
- Matches played: 31
- Goals scored: 93 (3 per match)
- Attendance: 23,320 (752 per match)
- Top goal scorer(s): Dejan Mezga; Marcos Tavares; Dejan Žigon (4 goals each)

The 2012–13 Slovenian Football Cup was the 22nd season of the Slovenian Football Cup, Slovenia's football knockout competition.

== Qualified clubs ==
=== 2011–12 Slovenian PrvaLiga members ===
- Celje
- Domžale
- Gorica
- Koper
- Maribor
- Mura 05
- Olimpija
- Rudar Velenje
- Triglav Kranj
- Nafta (dissolved following the 2011–12 season)

=== Qualified through MNZ Regional Cups ===
Winners and runners-up of the regional MNZ cups.

- MNZ Ljubljana: Bela Krajina, Kamnik
- MNZ Maribor: Pesnica, Dravograd
- MNZ Celje: Dravinja, Šmarje pri Jelšah
- MNZ Koper: Cerknica, Ankaran Hrvatini
- MNZ Nova Gorica: Tolmin, Brda
- MNZ Murska Sobota: Tromejnik, Šalovci
- MNZ Lendava: Odranci, Turnišče
- MNZG-Kranj: Jesenice, Šenčur
- MNZ Ptuj: Aluminij, Zavrč

== First round ==
Maribor, Celje, Olimpija, Mura 05 and Tolmin joined the competition in the second round (round of 16).

21 August 2012	Jesenice	(w/o)^{1}	Zavrč	Jesenice

21 August 2012	Šalovci	1–6	Gorica	Šalovci
17:00 CEST	Škerlak 7'	Report	Jakovljević 15'; Žigon 20', 64', 87'; N'Diaye 68'; Dornik 83'	Stadium: Sports Park; Attendance: 300; Referee: Roman Glažar

22 August 2012	Pesnica	1–2	Domžale	Pesnica
17:00 CEST	Muršič 74'	Report	Husmani 70'; Papež 80'	Stadium: Pesnica Stadium; Attendance: 400; Referee: Vojko Goričan

22 August 2012	Brda	1–1 (a.e.t.) (7–6 p)	Šenčur	Dobrovo
17:00 CEST	Pavič 73'	Report	Križaj 57'	Stadium: Vipolže Stadium; Attendance: 70; Referee: Asmir Sagrković
	Penalties
	Popovič (penalty scored); Črnigoj (penalty scored); Pintol (penalty scored); Pavič (penalty scored); Čermelj (penalty scored); Blaško (penalty scored); Mehanović (penalty scored)		(penalty scored) Stjepanović; (penalty scored) Ajdovec; (penalty scored) Brezarič; (penalty scored) Bunderla; (penalty scored) Kotnik; (penalty scored) Kern; (penalty missed) Frantar

22 August 2012	Dravograd	1–3	Rudar Velenje	Dravograd
17:00 CEST	Gluhovič 74' (pen.)	Report	Bratanović 27' (pen.); Bizjak 63', 81'	Stadium: Sports Centre; Attendance: 300; Referee: Bojan Mertik

22 August 2012	Tromejnik	0–2	Koper	Kuzma
17:00 CEST		Report	Čadikovski 30'; Majcen 55'	Stadium: Kuzma Football Stadium; Attendance: 250; Referee: Gregor Gostenčnik

22 August 2012	Šmarje pri Jelšah	2–4	Aluminij	Šmarje pri Jelšah
17:00 CEST	Oparenović 16'; Debelak 56'	Report	Vraničar 17'; Bešić 53'; Rešek 73'; Kmetec 90'	Stadium: Sports Park; Attendance: 200; Referee: Boris Tošeski

22 August 2012	Odranci	3–2	Bela Krajina	Odranci
17:00 CEST	Tompa 32'; Graj 61'; Lunder 69' (o.g.)	Report	Ćehić 43'; Pejić 71' (pen.)	Stadium: ŠRC Odranci; Attendance: 150; Referee: Alen Borošak

22 August 2012	Turnišče	0–8	Ankaran Hrvatini	Turnišče
17:00 CEST		Report	Horvat 14' (o.g.); Šestić 39'; Šahinović 44', 64', 85' (pen.); Valenčič 70', 77', 88'	Stadium: Turnišče Stadium; Attendance: 250; Referee: Emir Huselja

22 August 2012	Kamnik	1–3	Dravinja	Kamnik
17:00 CEST	Žeželj 66' (pen.)	Report	Černec 83'; Kotnik 62'; Žurej 90'	Stadium: Stadion Prijateljstva; Attendance: 100; Referee: Darjan Kovačič

22 August 2012	Cerknica	0–3	Triglav Kranj	Cerknica
17:00 CEST		Report	Jelar 45'; Stojnić 58'; Kongnyuy 87'	Stadium: Cerknica Stadium; Attendance: 300; Referee: Rade Obrenović

Notes

- Note 1: Zavrč qualified to the next round automatically, after Jesenice withdrew from the 2012–13 Cup edition.

== Round of 16 ==
The draw for the second round (round of 16) took place in Ljubljana at the headquarters of the Football Association of Slovenia on 3 September 2012.

19 September 2012	Mura 05	0–3	Olimpija	Murska Sobota
16:00 CEST		Report	Jović 58', 90' (pen.); Nikezić 83'	Stadium: Fazanerija; Attendance: 1,200; Referee: Darko Čeferin

19 September 2012	Tolmin	1–4 (a.e.t.)	Gorica	Tolmin
16:00 CEST	Kravanja 65'	Report	N'Diaye 47'; Praprotnik 99'; Celcer 115'; Jogan 119' (pen.)	Stadium: Brajda Sports Park; Attendance: 350; Referee: Roberto Ponis

19 September 2012	Dravinja	2–1	Domžale	Slovenske Konjice
16:00 CEST	Kotnik 17', 57'	Report	Knezović 71'	Stadium: Dobrava Stadium; Attendance: 100; Referee: Miran Bukovec

19 September 2012	Aluminij	1–1 (a.e.t.) (4–3 p)	Rudar Velenje	Kidričevo
16:00 CEST	Topolovec 51'	Report	Bratanović 85'	Stadium: Sports Park; Attendance: 200; Referee: Mitja Žganec
	Penalties
	Kmetec (penalty scored); Bingo (penalty scored); Topolovec (penalty scored); Kurež (penalty missed); Drevenšek (penalty scored)		(penalty scored) Jeseničnik; (penalty scored) Rotman; (penalty missed) Rošer; (penalty scored) Bratanović; (penalty missed) Radujko

19 September 2012	Brda	0–3	Celje	Brda
16:00 CEST		Report	Moćić 38'; Močivnik 47'; Žurej 66'	Stadium: Vipolže Stadium; Attendance: 100; Referee: Boris Tošeski

19 September 2012	Odranci	0–2 (a.e.t.)	Triglav Kranj	Odranci
16:00 CEST		Report	Poplatnik 114'; Jelar 116'	Stadium: ŠRC Odranci; Attendance: 150; Referee: Roman Glažar

19 September 2012	Ankaran Hrvatini	0–3	Koper	Ankaran
17:00 CEST		Report	Wellington Teixeira 35', 79'; Majcen 38'	Stadium: ŠRC Katarina; Attendance: 250; Referee: Davor Drečnik

31 October 2012^{2}	Zavrč	0–2	Maribor	Zavrč
19:00 CET		Report	Berić 26'; Mezga 31'	Stadium: Sports Park; Attendance: 2,000; Referee: Vojko Goričan

Notes

- Note 2: The match between Zavrč and Maribor was rescheduled from 19 September to 31 October, as Maribor played their first match of the 2012–13 UEFA Europa League on 20 September.

== Quarter-finals ==
The draw for the third round (quarter-finals) took place in Ljubljana at the headquarters of the Football Association of Slovenia on 8 October 2012. The quarter-final pairs were drawn together by footballer Tim Matavž, with each team playing one match at home and one away. At the time of the draw only seven quarter-finalist were known, as the round of 16 match between Zavrč and Maribor was rescheduled from 19 September to 31 October. However, the draw was possible because the teams were not seeded. The date of the quarter-finals match between Olimpija Ljubljana and Maribor was announced by the Football Association of Slovenia on 12 December 2012.

=== First leg ===
24 October 2012	Aluminij	1–2	Gorica	Kidričevo
15:00 CEST	Režonja 52'	Report	Žigon 2'; Vetrih 44'	Stadium: Sports Park; Attendance: 150; Referee: Davor Drečnik

24 October 2012	Triglav Kranj	0–1	Koper	Kranj
15:00 CEST		Report	Brečević 74'	Stadium: Stanko Mlakar Stadium; Attendance: 200; Referee: Dejan Balažič

24 October 2012	Celje	2–0	Dravinja	Celje
17:00 CEST	Verbič 2', 90+1'	Report		Stadium: Arena Petrol; Attendance: 400; Referee: Miran Bukovec

27 February 2013^{3}	Olimpija	1–3	Maribor	Ljubljana
18:30 CET	Omladič 61'	Report	Mezga 69', 87'; Rajčević 90+1'	Stadium: Stožice; Attendance: 4,000; Referee: Damir Skomina

Notes

- Note 3: The first leg of the quarter-finals match between Olimpija Ljubljana and Maribor was originally scheduled on 23 February 2013. However, after starting on schedule, the match was suspended in the 24th minute due to heavy snowfall. The match was then rescheduled for 27 February 2013, the date originally intended for the second leg match in Maribor.

=== Second leg ===
31 October 2012	Gorica	0–2 (2–3 agg.)	Aluminij	Nova Gorica
14:00 CET		Report	Jeleč 82'; Kurež 89'	Stadium: Sports Park; Attendance: 200; Referee: Dejan Balažič

31 October 2012	Koper	0–2 (a.e.t.) (1–2 agg.)	Triglav Kranj	Koper
18:00 CET		Report	Zolić 90+3'; Jelar 115'	Stadium: Bonifika; Attendance: 500; Referee: Slavko Vinčić

21 November 2012^{4}	Dravinja	0–1 (0–3 agg.)	Celje	Slovenske Konjice
13:00 CET		Report	Medved 48'	Stadium: Slovenske Konjice Sports Centre; Attendance: 100; Referee: Andrej Žnidaršič

6 March 2013^{5}	Maribor	0–1 (3–2 agg.)	Olimpija	Maribor
17:00 CET		Report	Valenčič 5'	Stadium: Ljudski vrt Attendance: 5,000; Referee: Matej Jug

Notes

- Note 4: The match between Dravinja and Celje was postponed from 31 October 2012 to 21 November 2012, due to bad conditions (flooded pitch).
- Note 5: The second leg of the quarter-finals match between Maribor and Olimpija Ljubljana was originally scheduled on 27 February 2013. However, the match was then rescheduled to 6 March 2013, due to the cancellation of the first leg match.

== Semi-finals ==
The draw for the fourth round (semi-finals) took place in Ljubljana at the headquarters of the Football Association of Slovenia on 8 March 2013. The semi-final pairs were drawn together by Slovenia national football team manager Srečko Katanec, with each team playing one match at home and one away. The semi-final consists of three Styrian clubs (Aluminij Kidričevo, Celje, Maribor) and Triglav Kranj. The 2012–13 Cup edition is Maribor's tenth successive season, where they have qualified at least to a semi-final stage of the competition. The 2011–12 Slovenian Football Cup final was played between Celje and Maribor.

=== First leg ===
1 May 2013^{6}	Triglav Kranj	2–2	Maribor	Kranj
17:00 CEST	Bubanja 14'; Đurković 76'	Report	Mezga 8'; Tavares 90'	Stadium: Stanko Mlakar Stadium; Attendance: 800; Referee: Davor Drečnik

1 May 2013^{6}	Aluminij	1–1	Celje	Kidričevo
17:00 CEST	Petek 66'	Report	Verbič 41'	Stadium: Sports Park; Attendance: 300; Referee: Miran Bukovec

Notes

- Note 6: The first leg of the semi-finals were rescheduled from 10 April 2013 to 1 May 2013, due to rescheduling of the matches in the Slovenian PrvaLiga.

=== Second leg ===
8 May 2013^{7}	Maribor	3–0 (5–2 agg.)	Triglav Kranj	Maribor
20:00 CEST	Tavares 50', 73', 77'	Report		Stadium: Ljudski vrt Attendance: 2,000; Referee: Vojko Goričan

8 May 2013^{7}	Celje	0–0 (1a–1 agg.)	Aluminij	Celje
18:00 CEST		Report		Stadium: Arena Petrol; Attendance: 1,500; Referee: Matej Jug

Notes

- Note 7: The second leg of the semi-finals were rescheduled from 17 April 2013 to 8 May 2013, due to rescheduling of the matches in the Slovenian PrvaLiga.

== Final ==
29 May 2013
20:45 CEST

Maribor	1–0	Celje
Ibraimi 44'	Report

Bonifika, Koper
Attendance: 1,500
Referee: Matej Jug
