= 2015–16 NK Domžale season =

NK Domžale
2015–16 season
- President: Stane Oražem
- Head Coach: Luka Elsner
- Stadium: Domžale Sports Park
- Slovenian League: 3rd
- Slovenian Cup: Semi-finals
- Europa League: 1st qualifying round
- Top goalscorer: League: Antonio Mance (11); All: Antonio Mance (11)
- Highest home attendance: 2,600 (vs Olimpija)
- Lowest home attendance: 300 (vs Zavrč)
- Average home league attendance: 1,003
Home colours	Away colours
- All statistics correct as of 8 June 2016.

The 2015–16 season was Domžale's 18th season in the Slovenian PrvaLiga, the Slovenian top division, since the league was created. Domžale competed in the PrvaLiga, Cup and Europa League. The season for the club began on 2 July 2015 and ended on 21 May 2016.

== Players ==
As of 1 March 2016

Note: Flags indicate national team as defined under FIFA eligibility rules; some limited exceptions apply. Players may hold more than one non-FIFA nationality.

No.	Pos.	Nation	Player
1	GK	SLO	Dejan Milić
2	DF	ESP	Álvaro Brachi
4	MF	SLO	Amedej Vetrih
5	DF	SLO	Darko Zec (captain)
6	DF	BIH	Kenan Horić
7	MF	AZE	Samir Masimov
8	MF	BRA	Juninho
9	MF	SRB	Filip Janković
10	FW	SLO	Slobodan Vuk
11	MF	SLO	Matic Črnic
12	GK	SLO	Adnan Golubovič
13	MF	SLO	Žan Žužek
14	DF	SLO	Dominik Ivkič
15	MF	SLO	Jan Repas
18	FW	GER	Senad Jarović

No.	Pos.	Nation	Player
20	MF	BIH	Aladin Šišić
21	MF	SLO	Ernest Grvala
22	GK	BIH	Ajdin Mulalić
23	MF	ARG	Lucas Mario Horvat
24	DF	SLO	Dejan Trajkovski
25	DF	SLO	Miha Blažič
27	DF	SLO	Gaber Dobrovoljc
29	DF	SLO	Jure Balkovec
31	FW	SLO	Gaber Petric
35	GK	FRA	Axel Maraval
37	MF	SLO	Žan Majer
77	MF	CRO	Marko Alvir
90	MF	MKD	Zeni Husmani
95	FW	CRO	Antonio Mance

Source:NK Domžale

== Competitions ==
=== Overall ===
Competition	Started round	Final position / round	First match	Last match
PrvaLiga	—	3rd	19 July 2015	21 May 2016
Cup	Round of 16	Semi-finals	9 September 2015	20 April 2016
UEFA Europa League	First qualifying round	First qualifying round	2 July 2015	9 July 2015

Updated to match played 8 June 2016
Source: Competitions

=== Overview ===
Competition	Record							
Competition	G	W	D	L	GF	GA	GD	Win %
PrvaLiga	36	14	13	9	46	31	+15	38.89
Cup	5	2	0	3	5	5	+0	40.00
Europa League	2	0	1	1	0	1	−1	0.00
Total	43	16	14	13	51	37	+14	37.21

Updated to match played 8 June 2016
Source: Competitions

=== PrvaLiga ===
==== League table ====
Pos	Team	Pld	W	D	L	GF	GA	GD	Pts	Qualification or relegation
1	Olimpija Ljubljana (C)	36	22	8	6	75	25	+50	74	Qualification for the Champions League second qualifying round
2	Maribor	36	19	11	6	78	37	+41	68	Qualification for the Europa League second qualifying round (Note: Maribor qualified for the Europa League second qualifying round by winning the 2015–16 Slovenian Cup.)
3	Domžale	36	14	13	9	46	31	+15	55	Qualification for the Europa League first qualifying round
4	Gorica	36	15	7	14	48	49	−1	52	Qualification for the Europa League first qualifying round
5	Celje	36	11	12	13	32	46	−14	45	

Source: Slovenian PrvaLiga (in Slovene), Soccerway
Rules for classification: 1) Points; 2) Head-to-head points; 3) Head-to-head goal difference; 4) Head-to-head goals scored; 5) Goal difference; 6) Goals scored.
(C) Champions

==== Results summary ====
Overall								Home						Away					
Pld	W	D	L	GF	GA	GD	Pts	W	D	L	GF	GA	GD	W	D	L	GF	GA	GD
36	14	13	9	46	31	+15	55	4	7	7	20	20	0	10	6	2	26	11	+15

Last updated: 8 June 2016.
Source: Competitive matches

==== Results by round ====
Round	1	2	3	4	5	6	7	8	9	10	11	12	13	14	15	16	17	18	19	20	21	22	23	24	25	26	27	28	29	30	31	32	33	34	35	36
Ground	A	H	A	H	A	H	A	A	H	H	A	H	A	H	A	H	H	A	A	H	A	H	A	H	A	A	H	H	A	H	A	H	A	H	H	A
Result	W	L	W	L	W	L	D	W	W	W	D	D	D	W	W	L	D	D	W	D	D	W	L	D	W	W	L	D	L	L	W	D	W	D	L	D
Position	2	5	2	5	4	4	4	3	3	3	3	3	4	3	2	3	3	3	3	3	3	3	3	3	3	3	3	3	3	3	3	3	3	3	3	3

Updated to match(es) played on 8 June 2016. Source: Competitive matches
A = Away; H = Home; W = Win; D = Draw; L = Loss

==== Matches ====
Win Draw Loss

19 July 2015 1	Koper	2–3	Domžale	Koper
20:15 CEST (UTC+02:00)	Mršič (yellow card) 23' (yellow-red card) 41'; Štromajer (yellow card) 38', (goal) 64'; Rahmanović (yellow card) 19', (goal) 66'; Štulac (yellow card) 45'; Radujko (yellow card) 90+3'; Ivančić (yellow card) 90+3'	Report (in Slovene)	Horvat (yellow card) 20'; Majer 28'; Skubic 35'; Júnior 53', (yellow card) 89'; Zec (yellow card) 76'	Stadium: Bonifika Stadium; Attendance: 450; Referee: Dragoslav Perić

25 July 2015 2	Domžale	0–1	Maribor	Domžale
20:15 CEST (UTC+02:00)	Horić (yellow card) 33'; Zec (yellow card) 36'; Vuk (yellow card) 90+2'	Report (in Slovene)	Tavares 23'; Mertelj (yellow card) 88'; Šuler (yellow card) 90+2'; Stojanović (yellow card) 90+4'	Stadium: Domžale Sports Park; Attendance: 2,200; Referee: Nejc Kajtazović

1 August 2015 3	Olimpija	0–2	Domžale	Ljubljana
20:15 CEST (UTC+02:00)	Kronaveter (yellow card) 16' (yellow-red card) 60'; Fink (yellow card) 27' (yellow-red card) 30'; Šporar (yellow card) 30'	Report (in Slovene)	Trajkovski 16'; Šišić (yellow card) 35'; Husmani (yellow card) 71'; Mance 85'	Stadium: Stožice Stadium; Attendance: 2,000; Referee: Matej Jug

8 August 2015 4	Domžale	0–2	Rudar	Domžale
18:30 CEST (UTC+02:00)	Horić (yellow card) 60' (yellow-red card) 75'	Report (in Slovene)	Bolha (yellow card) 6'; Prašnikar 25'; Jahić (yellow card) 26'; Ihbeisheh (yellow card) 70'; Kašnik (yellow card) 73'; Krcič 83'	Stadium: Domžale Sports Park; Attendance: 450; Referee: Damir Skomina

12 August 2015 5	Krka	0–4	Domžale	Novo Mesto
17:30 CEST (UTC+02:00)		Report (in Slovene)	Trajkovski (yellow card) 21'; Podlogar 29'; Horvat (yellow card) 42'; Črnic 45', 58'; Majer (yellow card) 52'; Dobrovoljc (yellow card) 79'; Mance 90+3'	Stadium: Portoval; Attendance: 500; Referee: Roberto Ponis

15 August 2015 6	Domžale	2–3	Gorica	Domžale
20:15 CEST (UTC+02:00)	Morel 25'; Črnic (yellow card) 41'; Horić (yellow card) 50'; Mance 58'	Report (in Slovene)	Eleke 5', 56'; Džuzdanović (yellow card) 23'; Humar (yellow card) 76'; Škarabot (yellow card) 87'; Širok 87'	Stadium: Domžale Sports Park; Attendance: 1,100; Referee: Andrej Žnidaršič

21 August 2015 7	Zavrč	0–0	Domžale	Zavrč
19:00 CEST (UTC+02:00)	Glavica (yellow card) 45'; Kokorović (yellow card) 72'; Pihler (yellow card) 75'	Report (in Slovene)	Podlogar (yellow card) 59'	Stadium: Zavrč Sports Park; Attendance: 700; Referee: Miran Bukovec

29 August 2015 8	Celje	0–3	Domžale	Celje
20:15 CEST (UTC+02:00)	Vidmajer (yellow card) 41'	Report (in Slovene)	Husmani 30', (yellow card) 48'; Vetrih (yellow card) 44'; Šišić 64'; Trajskovski (yellow card) 74'; Dobrovoljc 83'	Stadium: Arena Petrol; Attendance: 900; Referee: Damir Skomina

13 September 2015 9	Domžale	2–0	Krško	Domžale
17:45 CEST (UTC+02:00)	Vuk 13', 63'; Morel (yellow card) 26'; Vetrih (yellow card) 67'	Report (in Slovene)	Jurečič (yellow card) 10'; Petranić (yellow card) 64'	Stadium: Domžale Sports Park; Attendance: 800; Referee: Nejc Kajtazović

20 September 2015 10	Domžale	1–0	Koper	Domžale
17:45 CEST (UTC+02:00)	Skubic (yellow card) 10'; Horić (yellow card) 21'; Črnic 43'; Morel (yellow card) 52'	Report (in Slovene)	Tomić (yellow card) 44'	Stadium: Domžale Sports Park; Attendance: 850; Referee: Slavko Vinčić

23 September 2015 11	Maribor	1–1	Domžale	Maribor
18:00 CEST (UTC+02:00)	Mertelj (yellow card) 30'; Filipović (yellow card) 45'; Tavares 49'	Report (in Slovene)	Majer (yellow card) 9'; Vuk 58'; Vetrih (yellow card) 73'	Stadium: Ljudski vrt Attendance: 4,500; Referee: Matej Jug

26 September 2015 12	Domžale	1–1	Olimpija	Domžale
17:45 CEST (UTC+02:00)	Zec 66'; Dobrovoljc (yellow card) 69'; Majer (yellow card) 74'	Report (in Slovene)	Šporar 38', (yellow card) 69'; Mitrović (yellow card) 69' (red card); Kapun (yellow card) 78'; Fink (yellow card) 80'; Bajrić (yellow card) 83'; Alves Coelho Silva (yellow card) 88'	Stadium: Domžale Sports Park; Attendance: 2,600; Referee: Mitja Žganec

3 October 2015 13	Rudar	0–0	Domžale	Velenje
17:00 CEST (UTC+02:00)	Žitko (yellow card) 89'; Črnčič (yellow card) 90+2'	Report (in Slovene)		Stadium: Ob Jezeru City Stadium; Attendance: 800; Referee: Damir Skomina

17 October 2015 14	Domžale	3–0	Krka	Domžale
20:00 CEST (UTC+02:00)	Skubic (yellow card) 16'; Vuk (yellow card) 23', (goal) 61'; Horvat 34', 50'; Črnic (yellow card) 41'	Report (in Slovene)	Fuček (yellow card) 37'; Gliha (yellow card) 53' (red card)	Stadium: Domžale Sports Park; Attendance: 650; Referee: Roberto Ponis

25 October 2015 15	Gorica	0–1	Domžale	Nova Gorica
17:45 CET (UTC+01:00)	Burgič (yellow card) 35'; Škarabot (yellow card) 61'; Širok (yellow card) 69'	Report (in Slovene)	Blažič 83'; Črnic (yellow card) 87'	Stadium: Nova Gorica Sports Park; Attendance: 600; Referee: Slavko Vinčić

31 October 2015 16	Domžale	0–1	Zavrč	Domžale
15:30 CET (UTC+01:00)	Dobrovoljc (yellow card) 47' (yellow-red card) 70'	Report (in Slovene)	Cvek (yellow card) 27'; Kokorović (yellow card) 40'; Riera (yellow card) 42'; Muslimović 90+1'; Batrović (yellow card) 90+3'	Stadium: Domžale Sports Park; Attendance: 400; Referee: Bojan Mertik

8 November 2015 17	Domžale	2–2	Celje	Domžale
15:30 CET (UTC+01:00)	Mance 75'; Vuk (yellow card) 65', (goal) 90+3'; Horić (yellow card) 80'; Zec (yellow card) 84'	Report (in Slovene)	Pajač 14', 78', (yellow card) 84'; Vrhovec (yellow card) 44'	Stadium: Domžale Sports Park; Attendance: 650; Referee: Damir Skomina

25 November 2015 18	Krško	1–1	Domžale	Krško
17:30 CET (UTC+01:00)	Čeh 61'; Volarič (yellow card) 64'; Urbanč (yellow card) 69'; Petranić (yellow card) 81'; Sikošek (yellow card) 69'	Report (in Slovene)	Mance (yellow card) 45'; Zec (yellow card) 51'; Črnic (yellow card) 75' (goal) 90'	Stadium: Matija Gubec Stadium; Attendance: 600; Referee: Dragoslav Perić

28 November 2015 19	Koper	0–2	Domžale	Koper
20:00 CET (UTC+01:00)	Vekić (yellow card) 69'	Report (in Slovene)	Požeg 3'; Horić (yellow card) 7'; Morel 39'; Balkovec (yellow card) 72'	Stadium: Bonifika Stadium; Attendance: 250; Referee: Matej Jug

2 December 2015 20	Domžale	0–0	Maribor	Domžale
18:00 CET (UTC+01:00)	Mance (yellow card) 47'; Dobrovoljc (yellow card) 66'; Vetrih (yellow card) 72'	Report (in Slovene)	Šuler (yellow card) 19'; Tavares (yellow card) 79'; Filipović (yellow card) 84'	Stadium: Domžale Sports Park; Attendance: 2,100; Referee: Andrej Žnidaršič

6 December 2015 21	Olimpija	0–0	Domžale	Ljubljana
17:30 CET (UTC+01:00)	Henty (yellow card) 45'; Fink (yellow card) 62'; Klinar (yellow card) 72'; Kelhar (yellow card) 82'	Report (in Slovene)	Črnic (yellow card) 28'; Balkovec (yellow card) 40'	Stadium: Stožice Stadium; Attendance: 1,500; Referee: Dejan Balažič

12 December 2015 22	Domžale	4–0	Rudar Velenje	Domžale
15:00 CET (UTC+01:00)	Črnic 35'; Skubic 45' (pen.); Mance 57'; Zec 59'	Report (in Slovene)	Črnčič (yellow card) 11'; Radan (yellow card) 45'	Stadium: Domžale Sports Park; Attendance: 500; Referee: Davor Drečnik

28 February 2016 23	Krka	3–1	Domžale	Novo Mesto
15:00 CET (UTC+01:00)	Kostanjšek 17'; Vučkić (yellow card) 54'; Fuček 68' (pen.) 75'; Bogdan (yellow card) 79'	Report (in Slovene)	Horić (yellow card) 65'; Trajkovski (yellow card) 73'; Jarović 80'	Stadium: Portoval; Attendance: 500; Referee: Matej Jug

6 March 2016 24	Domžale	1–1	Gorica	Domžale
16:55 CET (UTC+01:00)	Trajkovski (yellow card) 26'; Črnic 51'; Zec (yellow card) 90'	Report (in Slovene)	Johnson (yellow card) 17'; Humar 59'; Boben (yellow card) 89'	Stadium: Domžale Sports Park; Attendance: 700; Referee: Bojan Mertik

12 March 2016 25	Zavrč	0–1	Domžale	Zavrč
19:00 CET (UTC+01:00)	Tahiraj (yellow card) 59'; Mužek (yellow card) 78'	Report (in Slovene)	Mance 15'; Jarović (yellow card) 44'; Júnior (yellow card) 79'; Dobrovoljc (yellow card) 82'	Stadium: Zavrč Sports Park; Attendance: 500; Referee: Damir Skomina

19 March 2016 26	Celje	1–2	Domžale	Celje
15:00 CET (UTC+01:00)	Érico Sousa 25'; Čirjak (yellow card) 66'; Miškić (yellow card) 82'	Report (in Slovene)	Črnic 66' (pen.); Balkovec 83'; Vetrih (yellow card) 85'	Stadium: Arena Petrol; Attendance: 900; Referee: Slavko Vinčić

2 April 2016 27	Domžale	2–3	Krško	Domžale
19:00 CEST (UTC+02:00)	Alvir (yellow card) 23', (goal) 77'; Dobrovoljc (yellow card) 50'; Mance 83'	Report (in Slovene)	Poljanec 41', 48'; Volarič 65', (yellow card) 79'; Jakolič (yellow card) 71'	Stadium: Domžale Sports Park; Attendance: 750; Referee: Alen Borošak

6 April 2016 28	Domžale	1–1	Koper	Domžale
18:00 CEST (UTC+02:00)	Blažič (yellow card) 44'; Alvir (yellow card) 55'; Dobrovoljc 60'; Husmani (yellow card) 89'	Report (in Slovene)	Belima (yellow card) 43', (goal) 67'; Ñíguez (yellow card) 56'; Andrejašič (yellow card) 72'; Štualc (yellow card) 89'	Stadium: Domžale Sports Park; Attendance: 600; Referee: Slavko Vinčić

9 April 2016 29	Maribor	2–1	Domžale	Maribor
16:55 CEST (UTC+02:00)	Novaković 22'; Defendi 58', (yellow card) 90+6'; Handanović (yellow card) 90+6'	Report (in Slovene)	Alvir (yellow card) 84'; Mance 89'; Majer (yellow card) 90+1'; Zec (yellow card) 90+6'	Stadium: Ljudski vrt Attendance: 3,500; Referee: Matej Jug

16 April 2016 30	Domžale	0–1	Olimpija	Domžale
16:55 CEST (UTC+02:00)	Vetrih (yellow card) 19'; Zec (yellow card) 28'; Horić (yellow card) 89'	Report (in Slovene)	Mitrović (yellow card) 66'; Kronaveter 69'	Stadium: Domžale Sports Park; Attendance: 2,500; Referee: Dejan Balažič

23 April 2016 31	Rudar	1–2	Domžale	Velenje
19:00 CEST (UTC+02:00)	S.Babić 75'; Lotrič (yellow card) 80'	Report (in Slovene)	Repas 41'; Husmani (yellow card) 58'; Mance 88'	Stadium: Ob Jezeru City Stadium; Attendance: 900; Referee: Damir Skomina

30 April 2016 32	Domžale	1–1	Krka	Domžale
19:00 CEST (UTC+02:00)	Šišić (yellow card) 14'; Horvat (yellow card) 53'; Mance 77'	Report (in Slovene)	Majcen (yellow card) 47'; Marotti (yellow card) 50'; Brkljača (yellow card) 84' (yellow-red card)	Stadium: Domžale Sports Park; Attendance: 350; Referee: Vojko Goričan

8 May 2016 33	Gorica	0–2	Domžale	Nova Gorica
16:55 CEST (UTC+02:00)	Humar (yellow card) 24'	Report (in Slovene)	Črnic 44'; Mance 69'	Stadium: Nova Gorica Sports Park; Attendance: 500; Referee: Slavko Vinčić

11 May 2016 34	Domžale	0–0	Zavrč	Domžale
19:00 CEST (UTC+02:00)	Trajkovski (yellow card) 53'; Črnic (yellow card) 60'; Mance (yellow card) 74'	Report (in Slovene)	Kokorović (yellow card) 60'	Stadium: Domžale Sports Park; Attendance: 300; Referee: Asmir Sagrković

14 May 2016 35	Domžale	0–3	Celje	Domžale
16:55 CEST (UTC+02:00)	Samir Masimov (red card) 47'	Report (in Slovene)	Miškić (yellow card) 38'; Podlogar 44', 45'; Pajač (yellow card) 69'; Vidmajer (yellow card) 74'; Čirjak	Stadium: Domžale Sports Park; Attendance: 400; Referee: Roman Glažar

21 May 2016 36	Krško	0–0	Domžale	Krško
16:55 CEST (UTC+02:00)	Gregov (yellow card) 68'	Report (in Slovene)	Grvala (yellow card) 19'; Balkovec (yellow card) 56'	Stadium: Matija Gubec Stadium; Attendance: 1,200; Referee: Matej Jug

=== Cup ===
==== Round of 16 ====
Win Draw Loss

16 September 2015 Round of 16	Ilirija	1–3	Domžale	Ljubljana
16:00 CEST (UTC+02:00)	Hvastija (yellow card) 20'; Urtelj 72'; Vasiljević (yellow card) 79'; Gazibegović (yellow card) 84'	Report (in Slovene)	Požeg Vancaš 39'; Dobrovoljc 60'; Šišić 73'	Stadium: Ilirija Sports Park; Attendance: 645; Referee: Rade Obrenović

==== Quarter-finals ====
28 October 2015 First leg	Domžale	0–1	Koper	Domžale
18:00 CEST (UTC+02:00)	Husmani (yellow card) 37'; Horvat (yellow card) 57'	Report (in Slovene)	Memolla (yellow card) 19'; Galešić (yellow card) 33'; Guberac (yellow card) 55'; Štromajer (yellow card) 84'; Rahmanović 89'	Stadium: Domžale Sports Park; Attendance: 650; Referee: Davor Drečnik

4 November 2015 Second leg	Koper	1–2 (2–2 (a.) agg.)	Domžale	Koper
18:00 CET (UTC+01:00)	Ivančić 47'; Lotrič (yellow card) 60'; Guberac (yellow card) 72'; Kahlina (yellow card) 90'	Report (in Slovene)	Črnic 3'; Morel (yellow card) 66', (goal) 90+2'; Horić (yellow card) 70'; Skubic (yellow card) 72'; Majer (yellow card) 79'	Stadium: Bonifika; Attendance: 250; Referee: Nejc Kajtazović

==== Semi-finals ====
13 April 2016 First leg	Celje	1–0	Domžale	Celje
18:00 CET (UTC+01:00)	Pajač (yellow card) 42'; Travner (yellow card) 52'; Omoregie 55'; Podlogar (yellow card) 57'; Vidmajer (yellow card) 64'; Blaž Vrhovec (yellow card) 80'	Report (in Slovene)	Črnic (yellow card) 17'	Stadium: Arena Petrol; Attendance: 900; Referee: Andrej Žnidaršič

20 April 2016 Second leg	Domžale	0–1 (0–2 agg.)	Celje	Domžale
17:30 CET (UTC+01:00)	Brachi (red card) 32'; Blažič (yellow card) 66'; Jarović (yellow card) 77'	Report (in Slovene)	Omoregie 6'; Spremo (yellow card) 20'; Miškić (yellow card) 73'	Stadium: Sports Park; Attendance: 800; Referee: Roberto Ponis

=== UEFA Europa League ===
==== First qualifying round ====
Win Draw Loss

2 July 2015 First leg	Domžale (Slovenia)	0–1	(Serbia) Čukarički	Domžale, Slovenia
20:00 CET (UTC+01:00)	Horić (yellow card) 42'; Dobrovoljc (yellow card) 47' (red card); Korun (yellow card) 82'; Zec (yellow card) 90+2'	Report	Matić 43' (pen.); Ostojić (yellow card) 57'; D.Srnić (yellow card) 63'	Stadium: Domžale Sports Park; Attendance: 1,200; Referee: Bart Vertenten (Belgium)

9 July 2015 Second leg	Čukarički (Serbia)	0–0 (1–0 agg.)	(Slovenia) Domžale	Belgrade, Serbia
20:30 CET (UTC+01:00)	D.Srnić (yellow card) 11'; S.Srnić (yellow card) 45'; Matić (yellow card) 63'; Janković (yellow card) 67'; Stojiljković (yellow card) 90+3'	Report	Horvat (yellow card) 36'; Morel (yellow card) 45'; Trajkovski (yellow card) 45+2'; Požeg Vancaš (yellow card) 52'; Grvala (yellow card) 65'; Korun (yellow card) 44' (yellow-red card) 90+5'	Stadium: Stadion Čukarički; Attendance: 1,800; Referee: Nikola Popov (Bulgaria)

== Statistics ==
=== Squad statistics ===
As of matches played 21 May 2016.

No.	Pos.	Player	Total				PrvaLiga				Cup				Europa League			
No.	Pos.	Player		Goal	Yellow card	Red card		Goal	Yellow card	Red card		Goal	Yellow card	Red card		Goal	Yellow card	Red card
1	GK	(Slovenia) Dejan Milić	0	0	0	0	0	0	0	0	0	0	0	0	0	0	0	0
2	DF	(Spain) Álvaro Brachi	7	0	0	1	6	0	0	0	1	0	0	0	0	0	0	0
4	MF	(Slovenia) Amedej Vetrih	25	0	7	0	25	0	7	0	0	0	0	0	0	0	0	0
5	DF	(Slovenia) Darko Zec	26	2	9	0	22	2	8	0	3	0	0	1	0	1	0	0
6	DF	(Bosnia and Herzegovina) Kenan Horić	36	0	9	1	30	0	7	1	4	0	1	0	2	0	1	0
7	MF	(Azerbaijan) Samir Masimov	6	0	0	1	5	0	0	1	1	0	0	0	0	0	0	0
8	MF	(Brazil) Juninho	29	1	2	0	25	1	2	0	3	0	0	0	1	0	0	0
9	MF	(Serbia) Filip Janković	2	0	0	0	2	0	0	0	0	0	0	0	0	0	0	0
10	FW	(Slovenia) Slobodan Vuk	20	5	3	0	17	5	3	0	1	0	0	0	2	0	0	0
11	MF	(Slovenia) Matic Črnic	21	9	7	0	28	8	6	0	3	1	1	0	0	0	0	0
12	GK	(Slovenia) Adnan Golubovič	3	0	0	0	1	0	0	0	2	0	0	0	0	0	0	0
13	MF	(Slovenia) Žan Žužek	3	0	0	0	3	0	0	0	0	0	0	0	0	0	0	0
14	DF	(Slovenia) Dominik Ivčič	1	0	0	0	1	0	0	0	0	0	0	0	0	0	0	0
15	DF	(Slovenia) Jan Repas	9	1	0	0	8	1	0	0	1	0	0	0	0	0	0	0
18	FW	(Germany) Senad Jarović	8	1	2	0	6	1	1	0	2	0	1	0	0	0	0	0
20	MF	(Bosnia and Herzegovina) Aladin Šišić	25	2	2	0	21	1	2	0	3	1	0	0	1	0	0	0
21	MF	(Slovenia) Ernest Grvala	8	0	2	0	7	0	1	0	0	0	0	0	1	0	1	0
22	GK	(Bosnia and Herzegovina) Ajdin Mulalić	0	0	0	0	0	0	0	0	0	0	0	0	0	0	0	0
23	MF	(Argentina) Lucas Mario Horvat	29	2	5	0	23	2	3	0	4	0	1	0	2	0	1	0
24	DF	(Slovenia) Dejan Trajkovski	34	1	6	0	28	1	5	0	4	0	0	0	2	0	1	0
25	DF	(Slovenia) Miha Blažič	19	1	2	0	15	1	1	0	4	0	1	0	0	0	0	0
27	DF	(Slovenia) Gaber Dobrovoljc	36	3	6	2	32	2	6	1	3	1	0	0	1	0	0	1
29	DF	(Slovenia) Jure Balkovec	14	1	3	0	11	1	3	0	3	0	0	0	0	0	0	0
31	FW	(Slovenia) Gaber Petric	0	0	0	0	0	0	0	0	0	0	0	0	0	0	0	0
35	GK	(France) Axel Maraval	15	0	0	0	13	0	0	0	2	0	0	0	0	0	0	0
37	MF	(Slovenia) Žan Majer	35	1	5	0	29	1	4	0	4	0	1	0	2	0	0	0
77	MF	(Croatia) Marko Alvir	14	1	3	0	12	1	3	0	2	0	0	0	0	0	0	0
90	MF	(North Macedonia) Zeni Husmani	19	1	5	0	15	1	4	0	3	0	1	0	1	0	0	0
95	FW	(Croatia) Antonio Mance	36	11	3	0	31	11	3	0	5	0	0	0	0	0	0	0
Players who left the club in Summer/Winter transfer window or on loan
–	GK	(Slovenia) Nejc Vidmar	26	0	0	0	22	0	0	0	2	0	0	0	2	0	0	0
–	DF	(Slovenia) Uroš Korun	2	0	2	1	0	0	0	0	0	0	0	0	2	0	2	1
–	MF	(France) Benjamin Morel	20	3	4	0	16	2	2	0	2	1	1	0	2	0	1	0
–	DF	(Slovenia) Žiga Kous	1	0	0	0	0	0	0	0	0	0	0	0	1	0	0	0
–	FW	(Senegal) Ousseynou Ndiaye	3	0	0	0	1	0	0	0	2	0	0	0	0	0	0	0
–	DF	(Slovenia) Nejc Skubic	26	2	3	0	22	2	2	0	3	0	1	0	1	0	0	0
–	MF	(Slovenia) Rudi Požeg Vancaš	10	2	1	0	7	1	0	1	1	0	0	2	1	0	0	0
–	DF	(Slovenia) Žan Kumer	1	0	0	0	1	0	0	0	0	0	0	0	0	0	0	0
–	FW	(Slovenia) Matej Podlogar	16	1	1	0	13	1	1	0	1	0	0	0	2	0	0	0
Own goals			–	0	–	–	–	0	–	–	–	–	0	–	–	0	–	–
TOTALS			–	51	92	6	–	46	74	3	–	5	9	1	–	0	9	2

=== Goalscorers ===
As of matches played 21 May 2016.

Rank	No.	Pos.	Player	PrvaLiga	Cup	Europa League	Total
1	95	FW	(Croatia) Antonio Mance	11	0	0	11
2	11	MF	(Slovenia) Matic Črnic	8	1	0	9
3	10	FW	(Slovenia) Slobodan Vuk	5	0	0	5
4	–	MF	(France) Benjamin Morel	2	1	0	3
4	27	DF	(Slovenia) Gaber Dobrovoljc	2	1	0	3
6	23	MF	(Argentina) Lucas Mario Horvat	2	0	0	2
6	5	DF	(Slovenia) Darko Zec	2	0	0	2
6	–	DF	(Slovenia) Nejc Skubic	2	0	0	2
6	–	MF	(Slovenia) Rudi Požeg Vancaš	1	1	0	2
6	20	MF	(Bosnia and Herzegovina) Aladin Šišić	1	1	0	2
11	90	MF	(North Macedonia) Zeni Husmani	1	0	0	1
11	8	MF	(Brazil) Juninho	1	0	0	1
11	–	FW	(Slovenia) Matej Podlogar	1	0	0	1
11	25	DF	(Slovenia) Miha Blažič	1	0	0	1
11	24	DF	(Slovenia) Dejan Trajkovski	1	0	0	1
11	37	MF	(Slovenia) Žan Majer	1	0	0	1
11	77	MF	(Croatia) Marko Alvir	1	0	0	1
11	29	DF	(Slovenia) Jure Balkovec	1	0	0	1
11	18	FW	(Germany) Senad Jarović	1	0	0	1
11	15	MF	(Slovenia) Jan Repas	1	0	0	1
Own goals				0	0	0	0
TOTALS				46	5	0	51

== See also ==
- 2015–16 Slovenian PrvaLiga
- 2015–16 Slovenian Football Cup
- 2015–16 UEFA Europa League
