= Jelar =

Jelar is a Slovenian surname. Notable people with the surname include:

- Anže Jelar (born 1991), Slovenian footballer
- Žiga Jelar (born 1997), Slovenian ski jumper

== See also ==
- Jelar Formation, geological formation in Croatia
