= Zorc =

Zorc is a surname. Notable people with the surname include:

- Anže Zorc (born 1994), Slovenian footballer
- Dieter Zorc (1939–2007), German footballer, father of Michael
- Michael Zorc (born 1962), German footballer and executive
- R. David Zorc (born 1943), American linguist
