= Adnan Golubović =

Slovenian footballer

Personal information
- Date of birth: 22 July 1995 (age 31)
- Place of birth: Ljubljana, Slovenia
- Height: 1.86 m (6 ft 1 in)
- Position: Goalkeeper

Team information
- Current team: Ballkani
- Number: 25

Youth career
- 2006–2008: Bravo
- 2008–2012: Interblock
- 2010: → Dob (loan)
- 2012: Olimpija Ljubljana
- 2013–2014: Interblock

Senior career*
Years	Team	Apps	(Gls)
2014–2015	Triglav Kranj	20	(0)
2015–2017	Domžale	11	(0)
2017–2018	Matera	30	(0)
2018	Catanzaro	4	(0)
2019–2020	Vis Pesaro	5	(0)
2020	→ Sloboda Tuzla (loan)	2	(0)
2020–2021	Sloboda Tuzla	28	(0)
2021–2023	Koper	59	(0)
2023–2025	Dinamo București	58	(0)
2025–	Ballkani	5	(0)

International career
2011–2012	Slovenia U17	4	(0)
2012–2013	Slovenia U18	5	(0)
2013	Slovenia U19	1	(0)
- * Club domestic league appearances and goals as of 22 June 2026

Adnan Golubović (born 22 July 1995) is a Slovenian professional footballer who plays as a goalkeeper for Superleague club Ballkani.

== Club career ==
Golubović made his Slovenian PrvaLiga debut for Domžale on 21 May 2016 in a game against Krško. On 6 November 2018, he was released from his Catanzaro contract by mutual consent. On 2 July 2019, he then signed with Serie C club Vis Pesaro for one year, with the club holding an option to extend the contract for another year.

On 11 January 2020, Golubović was loaned out to Bosnian Premier League club Sloboda Tuzla. In July 2020, he joined the club on a permanent contract. In May 2021, Golubović left Sloboda.

Before the start of the 2023–24 season, Golubović moved to Romanian Liga I club Dinamo București. He started the season as the first-choice goalkeeper, and recorded his first clean sheet on 14 August in a 1–0 victory against FC Botoșani.

== Career statistics ==
As of match played 14 August 2025.

Appearances and goals by club, season and competition
Club	Season	League			National cup (Note: Includes Slovenian Cup, Coppa Italia, Cupa României)		Continental		Other		Total	
Club	Season	Division	Apps	Goals	Apps	Goals	Apps	Goals	Apps	Goals	Apps	Goals
Triglav Kranj	2014–15	Slovenian Second League	20	0	2	0	—		—		22	0
Domžale	2015–16	Slovenian PrvaLiga	1	0	2	0	0	0	—		3	0
Domžale	2016–17	Slovenian PrvaLiga	10	0	0	0	2 (Note: Appearance in UEFA Europa League)	0	—		12	0
Domžale	Total		11	0	2	0	2	0	—		15	0
Matera	2017–18	Serie C	30	0	1	0	—		—		31	0
Catanzaro	2018–19	Serie C	4	0	—		—		—		4	0
Vis Pesaro	2019–20	Serie C	5	0	—		—		—		5	0
Sloboda Tuzla	2019–20	Bosnian Premier League	2	0	—		—		—		2	0
Sloboda Tuzla	2020–21	Bosnian Premier League	28	0	0	0	—		—		28	0
Sloboda Tuzla	Total		30	0	0	0	—		—		30	0
Koper	2021–22	Slovenian PrvaLiga	23	0	0	0	—		—		23	0
Koper	2022–23	Slovenian PrvaLiga	36	0	2	0	2 (Note: Appearances in UEFA Conference League)	0	—		40	0
Koper	Total		59	0	2	0	2	0	—		63	0
Dinamo București	2023–24	Liga I	39	0	3	0	—		2 (Note: Appearance in Liga I promotion/relegation play-offs)	0	44	0
Dinamo București	2024–25	Liga I	19	0	2	0	—		—		21	0
Dinamo București	Total		58	0	5	0	—		2	0	65	0
Ballkani	2025–26	Football Superleague of Kosovo	0	0	0	0	3	0	—		3	0
Career total			217	0	12	0	7	0	2	0	238	0

== Honours ==
Domžale

- Slovenian Cup: 2016–17

Koper

- Slovenian Cup: 2021–22
