= Zajko Zeba =

Bosnian footballer (born 1983)

Personal information
- Date of birth: 22 May 1983 (age 43)
- Place of birth: Sarajevo, SFR Yugoslavia
- Height: 1.75 m (5 ft 9 in)
- Position: Attacking midfielder

Youth career
- 2000–2002: Željezničar

Senior career*
Years	Team	Apps	(Gls)
2002–2003	Olimpik		
2003–2004	Brotnjo	14	(2)
2004	→ Željezničar (loan)	14	(3)
2004–2005	Zrinjski Mostar	22	(6)
2005–2006	Maribor	43	(10)
2007–2009	KAMAZ Naberezhnye Chelny	83	(21)
2010	Alania Vladikavkaz	0	(0)
2010–2012	Željezničar	68	(20)
2012–2013	RNK Split	4	(0)
2013	Olimpija Ljubljana	8	(1)
2014	Olimpik	9	(1)
2014–2015	Shkëndija	17	(2)
2015–2016	Sloboda Tuzla	49	(16)
2016–2018	Željezničar	29	(5)
2019–2020	Olimpik	37	(8)
2020–2021	Igman Konjic	13	(2)
Total		410	(97)

International career
2005–2007	Bosnia and Herzegovina	5	(0)

Managerial career
- 2018: Željezničar (assistant)
- * Club domestic league appearances and goals

Zajko Zeba (born 22 May 1983) is a Bosnian former professional footballer. He was part of the Bosnia and Herzegovina national team from 2005 to 2007.

During late 2018, Zeba also worked as a manager, holding the role of assistant manager at Željezničar and then as the club's youth team coach, after which he came out of retirement.

== Club career ==
Born in Sarajevo, Zeba started his career at hometown club Željezničar. He played for the youth sides, but never got an opportunity to play for the first team, so he moved to Olimpik. His performances produced interest from stronger teams in Bosnia and Herzegovina and resulted in a transfer to Brotnjo. In 2004, Željezničar officials brought Zeba back to his childhood club on loan, but after only several months, as a result of new disagreements, he signed a contract with Zrinjski Mostar.

His first foreign club was Slovenian PrvaLiga club Maribor. Then, he went to the Russian Football National League where he played for KAMAZ Naberezhnye Chelny. After a short period in Alania Vladikavkaz, Zeba came back to Željezničar, the club in which he had started his football career. In his third spell with Željezničar, Zeba won one league title, two cups and was named the 2011–12 Bosnian Premier League Player of the Season. In December 2012, he left Željezničar and went to RNK Split.

After coming back to Bosnia in early 2015, and signing with Sloboda Tuzla, he became the team captain the following season, and helped the team in winning the autumn part of the 2015–16 Bosnian Premier League season. At the end of the season, Zeba was named as the best player of the 2015–16 season in the Bosnian Premier League. In November 2016, he returned to Željezničar but he couldn't play for the club until 2017. In 2018, he won the Bosnian Cup with Željezničar and shortly after he retired at the age of 34.

On 20 December 2018, Zeba came out of retirement and for the third time in his career signed with Olimpik. He scored his first goal after coming back to Olimpik on 9 March 2019, in a 1–0 away win against Igman Konjic. On 26 May 2020, the 2019–20 First League of FBiH season ended abruptly due to the ongoing COVID-19 pandemic in Bosnia and Herzegovina and, by default, Zeba with Olimpik were crowned league champions and got promoted back to the Bosnian Premier League. He terminated his contract with the club on 22 September 2020.

One day after leaving Olimpik, on 23 September, Zeba signed with Igman Konjic. He made his debut only four days later, on 27 September, in a league match against Vis Simm-Bau. Zeba scored his first for Igman in a league game against Zvijezda Gradačac on 24 October 2020.

== International career ==
Zeba made his debut for Bosnia and Herzegovina in an August 2005 friendly game away against Estonia and has earned a total of 5 caps, scoring no goals. His final international was a September 2007 European Championship qualification against Moldova.

== Managerial career ==
=== Željezničar ===
In June 2018, after announcing his retirement, Zeba was appointed as an assistant manager at Željezničar. On 29 October 2018, after a string of poor results, it was announced that Zeba was dismissed of his position of assistant, while a month later, on 21 November, was named as a coach of the youth selections at the club.

In December 2018, Zeba left Željezničar after coming out of retirement and signing with Olimpik.

== Career statistics ==
=== Club ===
Appearances and goals by club, season and competition
Club	Season	League	League		Cup		Continental		Other		Total	
Club	Season	League	Apps	Goals	Apps	Goals	Apps	Goals	Apps	Goals	Apps	Goals
Brotnjo	2003–04	Bosnian Premier League	14	2	1	0	—		—		15	2
Željezničar	2003–04	Bosnian Premier League	14	3	0	0	—		—		14	3
Zrinjski Mostar	2004–05	Bosnian Premier League	22	6	5	1	—		—		27	7
Maribor	2005–06	Slovenian PrvaLiga	26	4	2	0	—		—		28	4
Maribor	2006–07	Slovenian PrvaLiga	17	6	2	0	7	3	—		26	9
Maribor	Total		43	10	4	0	7	3	—		54	13
KAMAZ Naberezhnye Chelny	2007	Russian Football National League	33	12	0	0	—		—		33	12
KAMAZ Naberezhnye Chelny	2008	Russian Football National League	25	6	0	0	—		—		25	6
KAMAZ Naberezhnye Chelny	2009	Russian Football National League	25	3	1	0	—		—		26	3
KAMAZ Naberezhnye Chelny	Total		83	21	1	0	—		—		84	21
Alania Vladikavkaz	2010	Russian Premier League	0	0	0	0	—		—		0	0
Željezničar	2010–11	Bosnian Premier League	27	11	4	6	2	0	—		33	17
Željezničar	2011–12	Bosnian Premier League	29	7	6	1	4	0	—		39	8
Željezničar	2012–13	Bosnian Premier League	12	2	1	0	2	0	—		15	2
Željezničar	Total		68	20	11	7	8	0	—		87	27
RNK Split	2012–13	1. HNL	4	0	—		—		—		4	0
Olimpija Ljubljana	2013–14	Slovenian PrvaLiga	8	1	0	0	2	0	1 (Note: Appearance in Slovenian Supercup)	0	11	1
Olimpik	2013–14	Bosnian Premier League	9	1	2	0	—		—		11	1
Shkëndija	2014–15	Macedonian First Football League	17	2	0	0	0	0	—		17	2
Sloboda Tuzla	2014–15	Bosnian Premier League	14	6	—		—		—		14	6
Sloboda Tuzla	2015–16	Bosnian Premier League	27	10	5	1	—		—		32	11
Sloboda Tuzla	2016–17	Bosnian Premier League	8	0	0	0	2	0	—		10	0
Sloboda Tuzla	Total		49	16	5	1	2	0	—		56	17
Željezničar	2016–17	Bosnian Premier League	13	2	4	0	—		—		17	2
Željezničar	2017–18	Bosnian Premier League	16	3	1	0	4	0	—		21	3
Željezničar	Total		29	5	5	0	4	0	—		38	5
Olimpik	2018–19	First League of FBiH	15	1	—		—		—		15	1
Olimpik	2019–20	First League of FBiH	16	7	2	1	—		—		18	8
Olimpik	2020–21	Bosnian Premier League	6	0	0	0	—		—		6	0
Olimpik	Total		37	8	2	1	—		—		39	9
Igman Konjic	2020–21	First League of FBiH	13	2	1	0	—		—		14	1
Career total			410	97	37	10	23	3	1	0	471	110

=== International ===
Appearances and goals by national team and year
National team	Year	Apps	Goals
Bosnia and Herzegovina
Bosnia and Herzegovina	2005	1	0
Bosnia and Herzegovina	2007	4	0
Total		5	0

== Honours ==
Zrinjski Mostar

- Bosnian Premier League: 2004–05

Željezničar

- Bosnian Premier League: 2011–12
- Bosnian Cup: 2010–11, 2011–12, 2017–18

Olimpik

- First League of FBiH: 2019–20

Individual

- Bosnian Premier League Player of the Season: 2011–12, 2015–16
