= Elvis Džafić =

Slovenian footballer

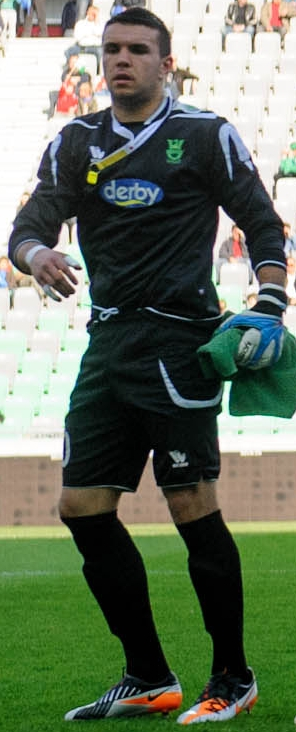
- Džafić warming up for Olimpija Ljubljana in 2012

Personal information
- Date of birth: 19 December 1990 (age 35)
- Place of birth: Ljubljana, SFR Yugoslavia
- Height: 1.90 m (6 ft 3 in)
- Position: Goalkeeper

Youth career
- –2009: Svoboda Ljubljana

Senior career*
Years	Team	Apps	(Gls)
2007–2010	Svoboda Ljubljana	16	(0)
2010–2014	Olimpija Ljubljana	64	(0)
2010–2011	→ Svoboda Ljubljana (loan)	21	(0)
2015–2018	Triglav Kranj	80	(0)
2018–2021	Sarajevo	4	(0)
2021–2023	Ilirija 1911	31	(0)

International career
2012	Slovenia U21	2	(0)
- * Club domestic league appearances and goals as of 7 July 2023

Elvis Džafić (born 19 December 1990) is a Slovenian professional footballer who plays as a goalkeeper.

Besides Slovenia, he has also played in Bosnia and Herzegovina.

== Club career ==
=== Early career ===
Džafić started off his career at hometown club Svoboda Ljubljana where he played for the youth team and later on for the seniors as well.

=== Olimpija Ljubljana ===
In 2010, Džafić signed with Slovenian PrvaLiga club Olimpija Ljubljana. He made 64 league appearances for Olimpija in the span of four seasons, the most being in the 2011–12 season making 33 league appearances. He left Olimpija in 2014.

=== Triglav ===
After leaving Olimpija, Džafić signed with Triglav Kranj, who back then played in the Slovenian Second League. He won the 2016–17 Slovenian Second League with Triglav and gained promotion to the 2017–18 Slovenian PrvaLiga.

He made 80 league appearances for Triglav, being a first team regular for the whole time. He left Triglav in 2018.

=== Sarajevo ===
On 17 August 2018, Džafić signed a contract with Bosnian Premier League club Sarajevo. He made his official debut for Sarajevo on 19 September 2018 in a 1–0 away win in the first round of the 2018–19 Bosnian Cup against Velež Mostar.

In the 2018–19 season, Džafić won the double with Sarajevo after winning both the Bosnian Cup and the Premier League. He made his first league appearance for Sarajevo in a 2–1 away league win against Velež Mostar on 23 November 2019.

Džafić won his second league title with the club on 1 June 2020, though after the 2019–20 Bosnian Premier League season was ended abruptly due to the COVID-19 pandemic in Bosnia and Herzegovina and after which Sarajevo were by default crowned league champions for a second consecutive time.

On 17 June 2020, he extended his contract with Sarajevo until June 2021. Džafić left Sarajevo after his contract with the club expired in June 2021.

== International career ==
Džafić made two appearances for the Slovenian under-21 team in 2012.

== Personal life ==
Džafić's family is from Bosnia and Herzegovina. His father is from Bosanski Novi and his mother is from Ključ.

== Career statistics ==
=== Club ===
As of match played 21 October 2020.

Appearances and goals by club, season and competition
Club	Season	League			National cup		Continental		Other		Total	
Club	Season	Division	Apps	Goals	Apps	Goals	Apps	Goals	Apps	Goals	Apps	Goals
Svoboda	2007–08	MNZ Ljubljana	4	0	—		—		—		4	0
Svoboda	2009–10	MNZ Ljubljana	12	0	—		—		—		12	0
Svoboda	Total		16	0	0	0	0	0	0	0	16	0
Olimpija	2010–11	Slovenian PrvaLiga	0	0	0	0	0	0	—		0	0
Olimpija	2011–12	Slovenian PrvaLiga	33	0	0	0	6 (Note: Appearance(s) in UEFA Europa League)	0	—		39	0
Olimpija	2012–13	Slovenian PrvaLiga	19	0	1	0	3	0	1 (Note: Appearance(s) in Slovenian Supercup)	0	24	0
Olimpija	2013–14	Slovenian PrvaLiga	12	0	3	0	2	0	1	0	18	0
Olimpija	Total		64	0	4	0	11	0	2	0	81	0
Triglav Kranj	2015–16	Slovenian Second League	23	0	1	0	—		—		24	0
Triglav Kranj	2016–17	Slovenian Second League	25	0	1	0	—		—		26	0
Triglav Kranj	2017–18	Slovenian PrvaLiga	32	0	3	0	—		2 (Note: Appearance(s) in Slovenian PrvaLiga relegation play-offs)	0	37	0
Triglav Kranj	Total		80	0	5	0	0	0	2	0	87	0
Sarajevo	2018–19	Bosnian Premier League	0	0	2	0	—		—		2	0
Sarajevo	2019–20	Bosnian Premier League	2	0	0	0	—		—		2	0
Sarajevo	2020–21	Bosnian Premier League	2	0	2	0	0	0	—		4	0
Sarajevo	Total		4	0	4	0	0	0	0	0	8	0
Career total			164	0	13	0	11	0	4	0	192	0

== Honours ==
Triglav Kranj

- Slovenian Second League: 2016–17

Sarajevo

- Bosnian Premier League: 2018–19, 2019–20
- Bosnian Cup: 2018–19, 2020–21
