= Fuad Gazibegović =

Slovenian footballer

Personal information
- Full name: Fuad Gazibegović
- Date of birth: 27 October 1982 (age 44)
- Place of birth: Ljubljana, SFR Yugoslavia
- Height: 1.85 m (6 ft 1 in)
- Positions: Midfielder; defender

Youth career
- 1988–2000: Slovan

Senior career*
Years	Team	Apps	(Gls)
2000–2003	Slovan	31	(0)
2003	Dravograd	0	(0)
2003–2004	Zarica	15	(0)
2004–2008	Livar	109	(1)
2009–2010	Zvijezda Gradačac	33	(0)
2010–2011	Krško	20	(2)
2011	Hermagor	16	(0)
2012	Zarica		
2012	Slovan	9	(3)
2013	Keflavík	5	(0)
2014–2015	Jezero Medvode	8	(1)
2015–2017	Ilirija	27	(1)
2018	SV Dellach/Gail	1	(0)
- * Club domestic league appearances and goals as of 21 October 2023

Fuad Gazibegović (born 27 October 1982) is a Slovenian retired footballer of Bosniak descent, who played as a midfielder or defender. He played for nine clubs in Bosnia, Slovenia, Austria and Iceland.
