= Anto Pejić =

Croatian footballer

Personal information
- Date of birth: 21 February 1989 (age 37)
- Place of birth: SFR Yugoslavia
- Position: Striker

Senior career*
Years	Team	Apps	(Gls)
-2009	Umag		
2009-2010	Olimpija Ljubljana	2	(0)
-2011	Pomorac Kostrena		
2011-2014	Bela Krajina	61	(18)
2014-2015	Teteks	2	(0)
2015	SHB Danang	8	(1)
2015	Hammerfest	10	(2)
2016	Eiger	14	(7)
2016	Leiknir Fáskrúðsfjörður	6	(0)
2016-2017	Nehaj		
2017	Posavina Frankfurt	1	(1)
2018	Nehaj		
2018-2019	Pathachakra FC		
2019-2020	Krk		
2020-2021	Halubjan		
2022	Vinodol		
2022-	Halubjan		
- * Club domestic league appearances and goals

Anto Pejić (born 21 February 1989 in Croatia) is a Croatian footballer.

== Career ==
In 2009/10, Pejić made 2 appearances for NK Olimpija Ljubljana in the Slovenian top flight.

In 2011, he signed for Slovenian second division side NK Bela Krajina, scoring 8 goals in his first 13 games.

After playing in Macedonia with FK Teteks and Vietnam with SHB Da Nang, he played in the Norwegian fourth division before joining Icelandic second division club Ungmennafélagið Leiknir midway through 2016. From there, Pejić played in the Croatian lower leagues with NK Nehaj as well as the German amateur leagues with Posavina Frankfurt.

In 2018, he signed for Indian state league outfit Pathachakra after more investment was being put into the league. Back in Croatia, he left Halubjan Viškovo for Vinodol in February 2022.
