= Jelar Formation =

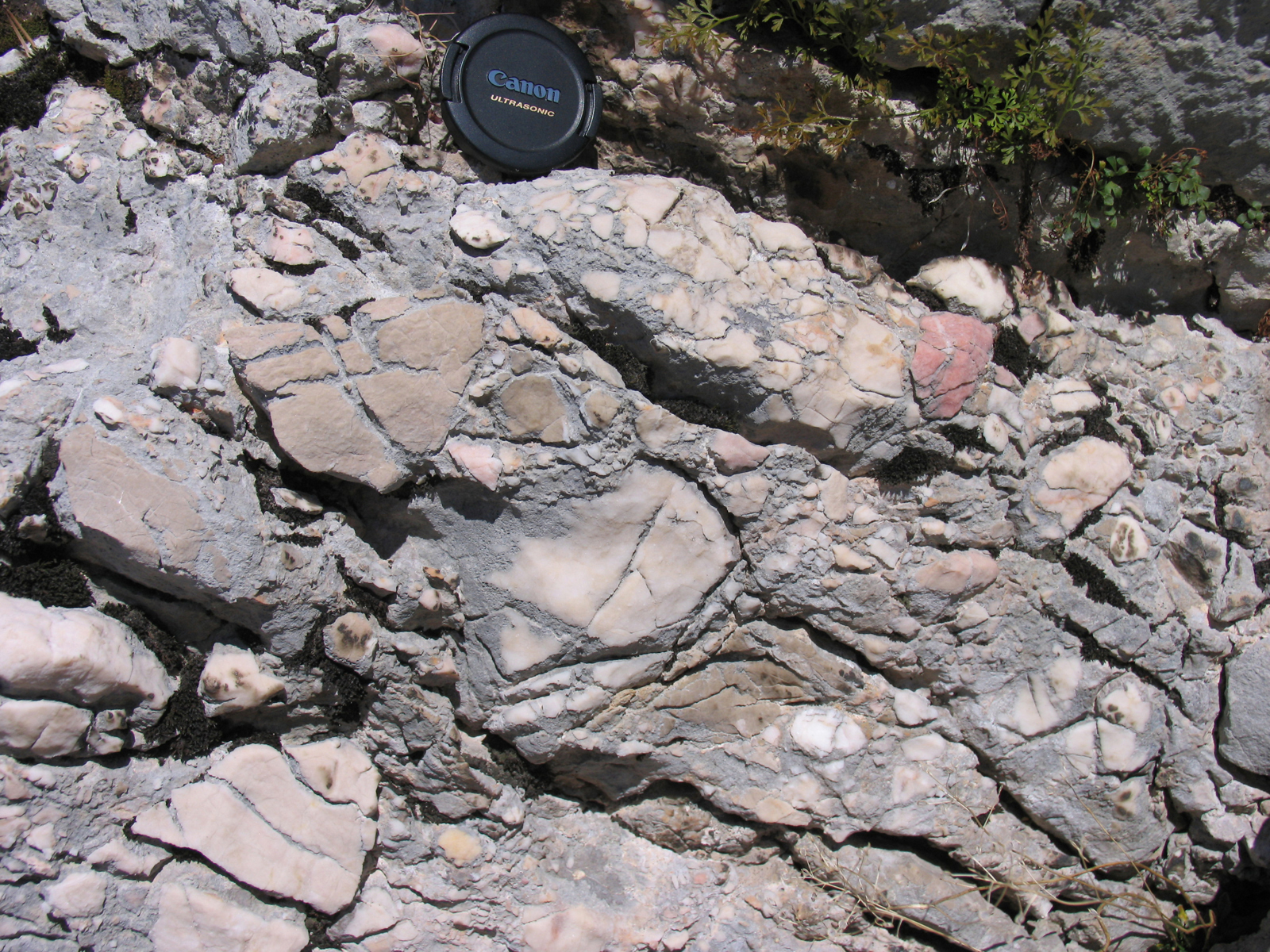
- Type: Geological formation

Lithology
- Primary: Breccia

Location
- Country: Croatia

The Jelar Formation or Jelar breccia is a stratigraphic unit in Croatia. It is a coarse-grained carbonate-breccia of Paleogene age. The breccia was deposited syntectonically during the development of the Dinaride Thrust Belt. The clasts are Mesozoic in age.
