= Jurica Jeleč =

Croatian footballer

Personal information
- Date of birth: 14 November 1986 (age 39)
- Place of birth: Sisak, SFR Yugoslavia
- Height: 1.88 m (6 ft 2 in)
- Position: Forward

Senior career*
Years	Team	Apps	(Gls)
2006–2007	Lokomotiva Zagreb		(16)
2007–2008	Vrapče		
2008	Travnik	5	(0)
2008–2009	Vrapče		
2009–2011	Lučko		
2011	Vrapče	10	(2)
2012	Travnik	11	(1)
2012–2013	Aluminij	15	(3)
2013	Zelina	7	(0)
2014	Bistra	16	(2)
2015	Hrvatski Dragovoljac	6	(0)
2015–2016	Brežice 1919		
- * Club domestic league appearances and goals

Jurica Jeleč (born 14 November 1986) is a Croatian former professional footballer who played as a forward.
