= Mitja Kovačević =

Slovenian footballer

Personal information
- Full name: Mitja Kovačević
- Date of birth: 12 April 1991 (age 35)
- Place of birth: Ljubljana, SFR Yugoslavia
- Position: Defender

Youth career
- 1998–2004: Olimpija
- 2005–2010: Olimpija Ljubljana

Senior career*
Years	Team	Apps	(Gls)
2010–2013	Olimpija Ljubljana	13	(0)
2012	→ Radomlje (loan)	9	(0)
2013–2014	Aluminij	10	(0)
2014–2018	Ivančna Gorica	60	(4)
- * Club domestic league appearances and goals as of 8 December 2023

Mitja Kovačević (born 12 April 1991 in Ljubljana) is a Slovenian footballer who plays as a defender.

Kovačević made his debut for Olimpija at 14 November 2010 against Domžale. On 22 January 2011, he signed a four-year deal with Olimpija.
