= Robi Jakovljević =

Slovenian footballer

Personal information
- Full name: Robi Jakovljević
- Date of birth: 7 May 1993 (age 33)
- Place of birth: Slovenia
- Height: 1.77 m (5 ft 10 in)
- Position: Defender

Youth career
- –2008: Rudar Trbovlje
- 2008–2012: Gorica

Senior career*
Years	Team	Apps	(Gls)
2012–2014	Gorica	12	(0)
2012–2014	→ Brda (loan)	32	(1)
2014–2021	Radomlje	129	(7)
2015	→ Radomlje B	3	(1)

International career
2011–2012	Slovenia U19	11	(0)
- * Club domestic league appearances and goals as of 1 January 2017

Robi Jakovljević (born 7 May 1993) is a Slovenian footballer who most recently played for Radomlje in the Slovenian PrvaLiga.
