= Dejan Djermanović =

Slovenian footballer (born 1988)

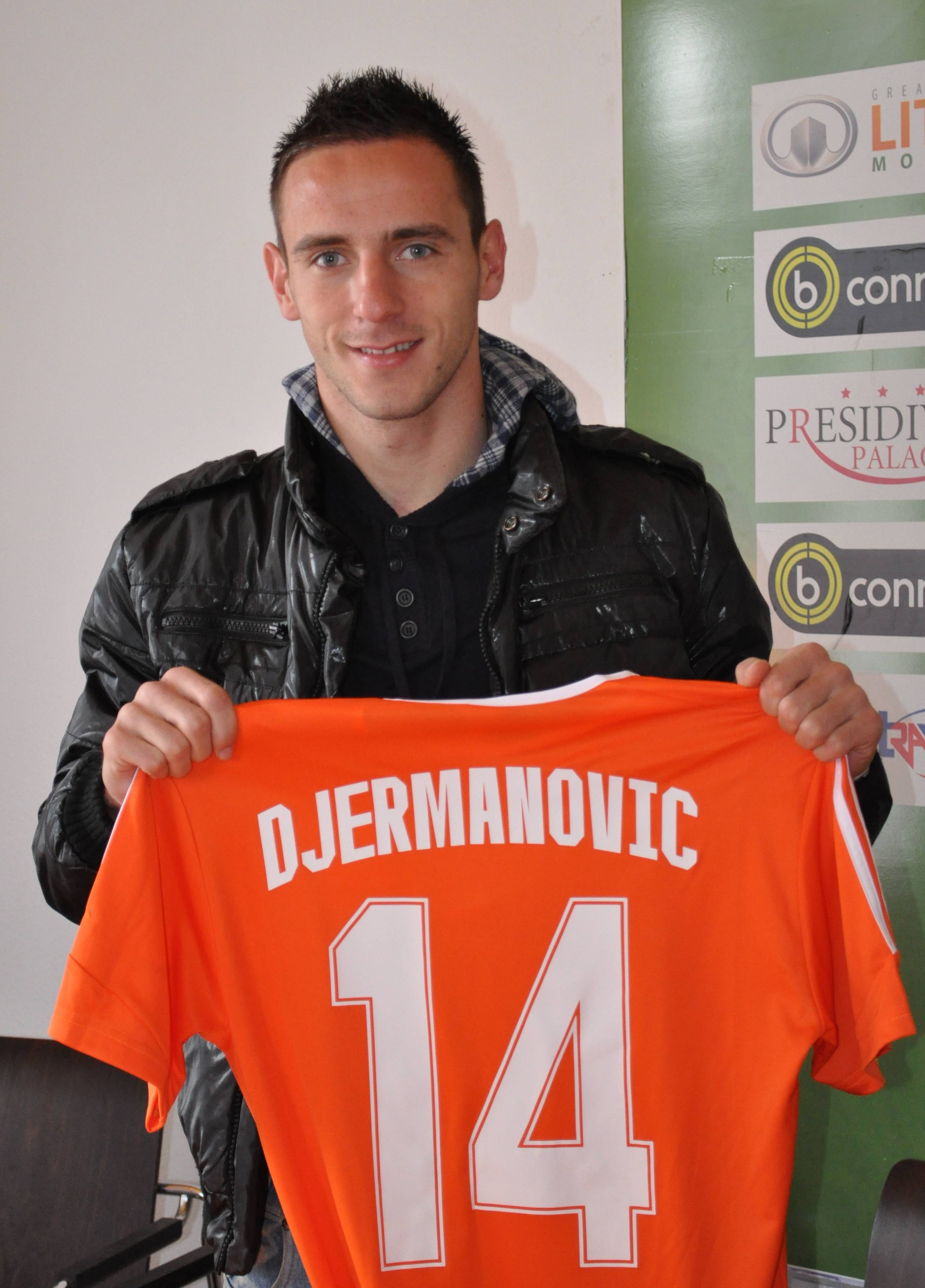

Personal information
- Date of birth: 17 June 1988 (age 38)
- Place of birth: Ljubljana, SFR Yugoslavia
- Height: 1.87 m (6 ft 2 in)
- Position: Forward

Team information
- Current team: Vrhnika

Youth career
- –2002: Domžale
- 2003–2005: Olimpija
- 2005–2007: Svoboda Ljubljana

Senior career*
Years	Team	Apps	(Gls)
2006–2007	Svoboda Ljubljana	8	(2)
2009	Slavija Sarajevo	12	(0)
2010	Krško	12	(5)
2010	Rudar Velenje	18	(8)
2011	Litex Lovech	21	(5)
2012–2015	Olimpija Ljubljana	38	(10)
2014	→ Celje (loan)	10	(0)
2015	→ Voždovac (loan)	7	(0)
2016	Željezničar Sarajevo	9	(1)
2016	Zhetysu	12	(5)
2017	Miedź Legnica	4	(0)
2017	Miedź Legnica II	2	(0)
2017–2018	Stal Mielec	25	(7)
2018–2019	Paide Linnameeskond	9	(4)
2019	Al-Nasr		
2019–2020	Koper	8	(3)
2020–2024	Ilirija 1911	86	(39)
2024	Rudar Velenje	25	(6)
2025–	Vrhnika	1	(1)
- * Club domestic league appearances and goals as of 16 March 2025

Dejan Djermanović (born 17 June 1988) is a Slovenian footballer who plays as a forward for Vrhnika.

== Career ==
Djermanović played for Slavija Sarajevo in Bosnia and Herzegovina and for Krško and Rudar Velenje in Slovenia, before signing with Bulgarian side Litex Lovech in January 2011. In early 2012, Djermanović returned to Slovenia and signed with Olimpija Ljubljana, where he scored a hat-trick on his debut against Nafta Lendava.

In the 2014–15 season he played the first half of the season on loan at another Slovenian top-flight side, Celje, and in January 2015 Olimpija agreed to loan him to the Serbian SuperLiga side Voždovac.

On 6 July 2016, Zhetysu announced that they had signed Djermanović.

On 2 February 2017, he joined the Polish second division team Miedź Legnica.

== Honours ==
Litex Lovech

- Bulgarian A PFG: 2010–11
