= Alen Krajnc =

Slovenian footballer (born 1995)

Personal information
- Date of birth: 1 July 1995 (age 31)
- Place of birth: Slovenia
- Height: 1.80 m (5 ft 11 in)
- Positions: Winger; full-back

Youth career
- –2011: Drava Ptuj
- 2011–2012: Aluminij
- 2012–2013: Koper

Senior career*
Years	Team	Apps	(Gls)
2013–2015	Koper	3	(0)
2014	→ Jadran Dekani (loan)	6	(3)
2016	Drava Ptuj	8	(0)
2016	Zavrč	8	(2)
2017–2021	Aluminij	97	(11)
2021–2022	Rogaška	14	(10)
2022–2023	Gorica	41	(6)
2023–2024	Velež Mostar	5	(1)

International career
2011	Slovenia U17	2	(0)
2013	Slovenia U18	2	(0)
2013	Slovenia U19	2	(0)
- * Club domestic league appearances and goals

Alen Krajnc (born 1 July 1995) is a Slovenian footballer.
