= Jaka Corn =

Slovenian footballer

Personal information
- Full name: Jaka Corn
- Date of birth: 14 April 1995 (age 31)
- Place of birth: Slovenia
- Position: Midfielder

Team information
- Current team: FC Hermagor
- Number: 17

Youth career
- –2014: Olimpija Ljubljana

Senior career*
Years	Team	Apps	(Gls)
2014	Olimpija Ljubljana	6	(1)
2015	Šenčur	9	(1)
2015–2017	Bravo	44	(35)
2017–2021	Ilirija 1911	76	(14)
2021–2022	FC Lendorf	32	(1)
2022–2023	Villach	28	(7)
2023–	FC Hermagor	3	(2)

International career
2012–2013	Slovenia U18	13	(1)
2013	Slovenia U19	2	(0)
- * Club domestic league appearances and goals as of 24 August 2023

Jaka Corn (born 14 April 1995) is a football midfielder from Slovenia. His current club is FC Hermagor.

== Club career ==
Corn has played in the Austrian lower leagues since 2021.
