= Marko Zalaznik =

Slovenian footballer (1994–2023)

Personal information
- Date of birth: 7 October 1994
- Date of death: 15 May 2023 (aged 28)
- Position: Winger

Youth career
- –2012: Radomlje

Senior career*
Years	Team	Apps	(Gls)
2012–2014	Radomlje	43	(15)
2014	Olimpija Ljubljana	2	(0)
2014	Vir	3	(0)
Total		48	(15)

International career
2012	Slovenia U19	5	(0)
- * Club domestic league appearances and goals

Marko Zalaznik (7 October 1994 – 15 May 2023) was a Slovenian footballer who played as a winger.
