= Vinko Buden =

Croatian footballer

Personal information
- Date of birth: 18 January 1986 (age 40)
- Place of birth: Zagreb, SFR Yugoslavia
- Height: 1.84 m (6 ft 1/2 in)
- Position: Defender

Team information
- Current team: Stupnik

Youth career
- Zagreb

Senior career*
Years	Team	Apps	(Gls)
2004–2007	Lučko	115	
2007–2008	Vinogradar	18	(0)
2008–2009	Inter Zaprešić	29	(0)
2010	Kastrioti	14	(0)
2010	Baltika Kaliningrad	11	(0)
2011–2013	Lučko	40	(1)
2013	Ethnikos Achna	6	(0)
2013	Lučko	16	(0)
2014	Krka	15	(1)
2015	Ceahlăul Piatra Neamț	11	(1)
2016-2017	Top Kerestinec		
2018-	Stupnik		
- * Club domestic league appearances and goals as of 25 February 2018

Vinko Buden (born 18 January 1986 in Zagreb) is a Croatian footballer who plays for NK Stupnik as a defender.

== Club career ==
A central defender, Vinko Buden started his senior career with Lučko in the 2004–2005 season. In June 2007 he moved to Druga HNL club Vinogradar, where he played one season. After a very good season in the second division, he had the attention of several clubs from the Prva HNL and decided to sign a contract with Inter Zaprešić. In June 2008 he moved to Inter Zaprešić, where he played one and a half seasons. In January 2010, he joined Albanian Kastrioti Krujë. From his first game for Kastrioti Krujë he was turning attention on himself with his style and courage. Six months later, he received an offer from Russia Baltika Kaliningrad and did not doubt for even a second - the decision was to go to Russia. After eight months at the club, in which Buden appeared in 11 matches, problems started. Problems with papers made him unemployed for four months. In June 2011 he returned in his first senior football club Lučko, now playing in the Croatian premier league. Vinko stayed for one and a half seasons. In January 2013, he looked for a new international club and signed a contract with Cypriot premier division club Achna, seeking to help them to stay in the elite rank.
