= Đorđe Ivelja =

Serbian footballer

Personal information
- Full name: Đorđe Ivelja
- Date of birth: 30 June 1984 (age 42)
- Place of birth: Bačka Palanka, SFR Yugoslavia
- Height: 1.75 m (5 ft 9 in)
- Position: Central midfielder

Youth career
- Bačka Palanka

Senior career*
Years	Team	Apps	(Gls)
2000–2001	Bačka Palanka	45	(32)
2001–2008	OFK Beograd	82	(2)
2003	→ Veternik (loan)	15	(5)
2004	→ ČSK Čelarevo (loan)	3	(2)
2004	→ Mladi Radnik (loan)	11	(1)
2005–2006	→ Mačva Šabac (loan)	46	(13)
2009	Rapid București	11	(0)
2010	Nasaf Qarshi	7	(0)
2011–2013	Olimpija Ljubljana	50	(2)
2014	Javor Ivanjica	23	(3)
2015	Bačka Palanka	12	(3)
2015–2016	Napredak Kruševac	26	(2)
2016	Zemun	11	(0)
2017	Montana	7	(0)
2017	Pajde Möhlin	3	(0)
2018	Kolubara	0	(0)
2019–2021	Hercegovac Gajdobra		
2021–2022	Sinđelić Beograd		

International career
2003	Serbia and Montenegro U19	1	(0)
2006–2007	Serbia U21	4	(0)
Medal record
Silver medal – second place	UEFA Under-21 Championship	2007
- * Club domestic league appearances and goals as of 23 June 2017

Đorđe Ivelja (Serbian Cyrillic: Ђорђе Ивеља; also transliterated Djordje Ivelja; born 30 June 1984) is a Serbian retired footballer who played as a midfielder.

== Club career ==
Ivelja made his First League of FR Yugoslavia debut with OFK Beograd in 2001, aged 17. He spent seven years there, including several loan spells with lower-tier clubs. In early 2009, Ivelja moved to Romanian side Rapid București. He made 11 league appearances for the club, before leaving at the end of the year.

On 12 January 2017, Ivelja joined Bulgarian First League side Montana, signing a short-term contract. He left the club in June. In the summer of 2017, Ivelja joined Swiss club NK Pajde Möhlin.

== International career ==
Ivelja represented Serbia at the 2007 UEFA European Under-21 Championship, winning the silver medal.

== Statistics ==
Club	Season	League	
Club	Season	Apps	Goals
OFK Beograd	2001–02	6	1
OFK Beograd	2002–03	9	1
OFK Beograd	2003–04	8	0
OFK Beograd	2004–05	0	0
OFK Beograd	2005–06	10	0
OFK Beograd	2006–07	26	0
OFK Beograd	2007–08	23	0
OFK Beograd	Total	82	2

== Honours ==
Napredak Kruševac

- Serbian First League: 2015–16
