= Kenan Bajrić =

Slovenian footballer (born 1994)

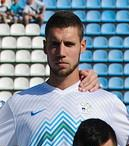
- Bajrić with Slovenia U21 in 2015

Personal information
- Date of birth: 20 December 1994 (age 31)
- Place of birth: Ljubljana, Slovenia
- Height: 1.89 m (6 ft 2 in)
- Position: Centre-back

Team information
- Current team: Slovan Bratislava
- Number: 12

Youth career
- –2011: Interblock
- 2011–2013: Olimpija Ljubljana

Senior career*
Years	Team	Apps	(Gls)
2012–2017	Olimpija Ljubljana	114	(6)
2018–	Slovan Bratislava	177	(10)
2021–2023	→ Pafos (loan)	70	(0)

International career^{‡}
2012	Slovenia U18	1	(0)
2015–2016	Slovenia U21	12	(0)
2020–	Slovenia	5	(0)
- * Club domestic league appearances and goals as of 31 October 2026 ‡ National team caps and goals as of 13 October 2024

Kenan Bajrić (born 20 December 1994) is a Slovenian professional footballer who plays as a defender for Slovan Bratislava.

== Club career ==
After seven seasons with his hometown club Olimpija Ljubljana, Bajrić moved abroad and joined Slovak powerhouse Slovan Bratislava in January 2018. In summer 2021, he was loaned to Cypriot club Pafos.

== International career ==
On 11 November 2020, Bajrić debuted for the Slovenia senior team in a friendly match against Azerbaijan.

== Career statistics ==
=== Club ===
As of match played 31 October 2026

Appearances and goals by club, season and competition
Club	Season	League			National cup (Note: Includes Slovenian Cup, Slovak Cup, Cypriot Cup)		Continental		Other		Total	
Club	Season	Division	Apps	Goals	Apps	Goals	Apps	Goals	Apps	Goals	Apps	Goals
Olimpija Ljubljana	2011–12	Slovenian PrvaLiga	2	0	—		—		—		2	0
Olimpija Ljubljana	2012–13	Slovenian PrvaLiga	2	0	—		—		—		2	0
Olimpija Ljubljana	2013–14	Slovenian PrvaLiga	14	0	1	0	—		1 (Note: Appearance in Slovenian Supercup)	0	16	0
Olimpija Ljubljana	2014–15	Slovenian PrvaLiga	33	2	3	0	—		—		36	2
Olimpija Ljubljana	2015–16	Slovenian PrvaLiga	21	1	3	0	—		—		24	1
Olimpija Ljubljana	2016–17	Slovenian PrvaLiga	24	0	6	0	2 (Note: Appearances in UEFA Champions League)	0	—		32	0
Olimpija Ljubljana	2017–18	Slovenian PrvaLiga	18	3	3	0	1 (Note: Appearances in UEFA Europa League)	0	—		22	3
Olimpija Ljubljana	Total		114	6	16	0	3	0	1	0	134	6
Slovan Bratislava	2017–18	Slovak First Football League	13	0	3	0	—		—		16	0
Slovan Bratislava	2018–19	Slovak First Football League	31	1	1	0	6	0	—		38	1
Slovan Bratislava	2019–20	Slovak First Football League	17	3	5	0	10 (Note: Two appearances in UEFA Champions League, eight appearances in UEFA Europa League)	0	—		32	3
Slovan Bratislava	2020–21	Slovak First Football League	26	2	6	1	1	0	—		33	3
Slovan Bratislava	2023–24	Slovak First Football League	27	0	2	0	16 (Note: Six appearances in UEFA Champions League, two appearances in UEFA Europa League, eight appearances in UEFA Europa Conference League)	0	—		45	0
Slovan Bratislava	2024–25	Slovak First Football League	27	2	4	0	16	0	—		47	2
Slovan Bratislava	2025–26	Slovak First Football League	27	0	2	0	12 (Note: Four appearances in UEFA Champions League, two appearances in UEFA Europa League, six appearances in UEFA Conference League)	0	—		41	0
Slovan Bratislava	2026–27	Slovak First Football League	9	2	0	0	9	0	—		18	2
Slovan Bratislava	Total		177	10	23	1	69	0	—		269	11
Pafos (loan)	2021–22	Cypriot First Division	30	0	2	0	—		—		32	0
Pafos (loan)	2022–23	Cypriot First Division	35	0	3	0	—		—		38	0
Pafos (loan)	Total		65	0	5	0	—		—		70	0
Career total			356	16	44	1	73	0	1	0	474	17

=== International ===
As of match played 13 October 2024

Appearances and goals by national team and year
National team	Year	Apps	Goals
Slovenia	2020	2	0
Slovenia	2021	2	0
Slovenia	2022	0	0
Slovenia	2023	0	0
Slovenia	2024	1	0
Total		5	0

== Honours ==
Olimpija Ljubljana

- Slovenian First League: 2015–16

Slovan Bratislava

- Slovak First League: 2018–19, 2019–20, 2020–21, 2023–24, 2024–25
- Slovak Cup: 2017–18, 2019–20, 2020–21
