= Milan Anđelković =

Slovenian footballer (born 1981)

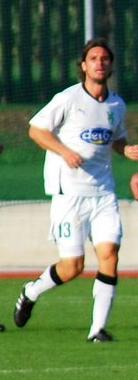

Personal information
- Date of birth: 1 September 1981 (age 45)
- Place of birth: Ljubljana, SFR Yugoslavia
- Height: 1.93 m (6 ft 4 in)
- Position: Centre-back

Team information
- Current team: Koper (manager)

Youth career
- Slovan

Senior career*
Years	Team	Apps	(Gls)
2001–2005	Ljubljana	87	(4)
2005–2006	Bela Krajina	34	(1)
2006–2007	Interblock	17	(0)
2007	Fervorosa Hakusan Ishikawa	10	(0)
2007–2008	Bela Krajina	18	(2)
2008–2010	Celje	66	(5)
2010–2012	Olimpija Ljubljana	49	(4)
2012–2013	Nocerina	10	(1)
2013	Olimpija Ljubljana	12	(2)
2014	Ethnikos Achna	18	(1)
2014	Olimpia Grudziądz	7	(0)
2015	Alpe Adria	14	(2)
2015–2016	Triestina	26	(2)
2016–2017	Radomlje	13	(0)

International career
2001	Slovenia U20	1	(0)
2002–2003	Slovenia U21	2	(0)

Managerial career
- 2022–2026: Primorje
- 2026–: Koper
- * Club domestic league appearances and goals

Milan Anđelković (born 1 September 1981) is a Slovenian former professional footballer who played as a defender. He is the current manager of Slovenian PrvaLiga club Koper.

In addition to his native Slovenia, Anđelković has played in Japan, Italy, Cyprus, Poland and Austria.
