= Franklin Vicente =

Brazilian footballer (born 1989)

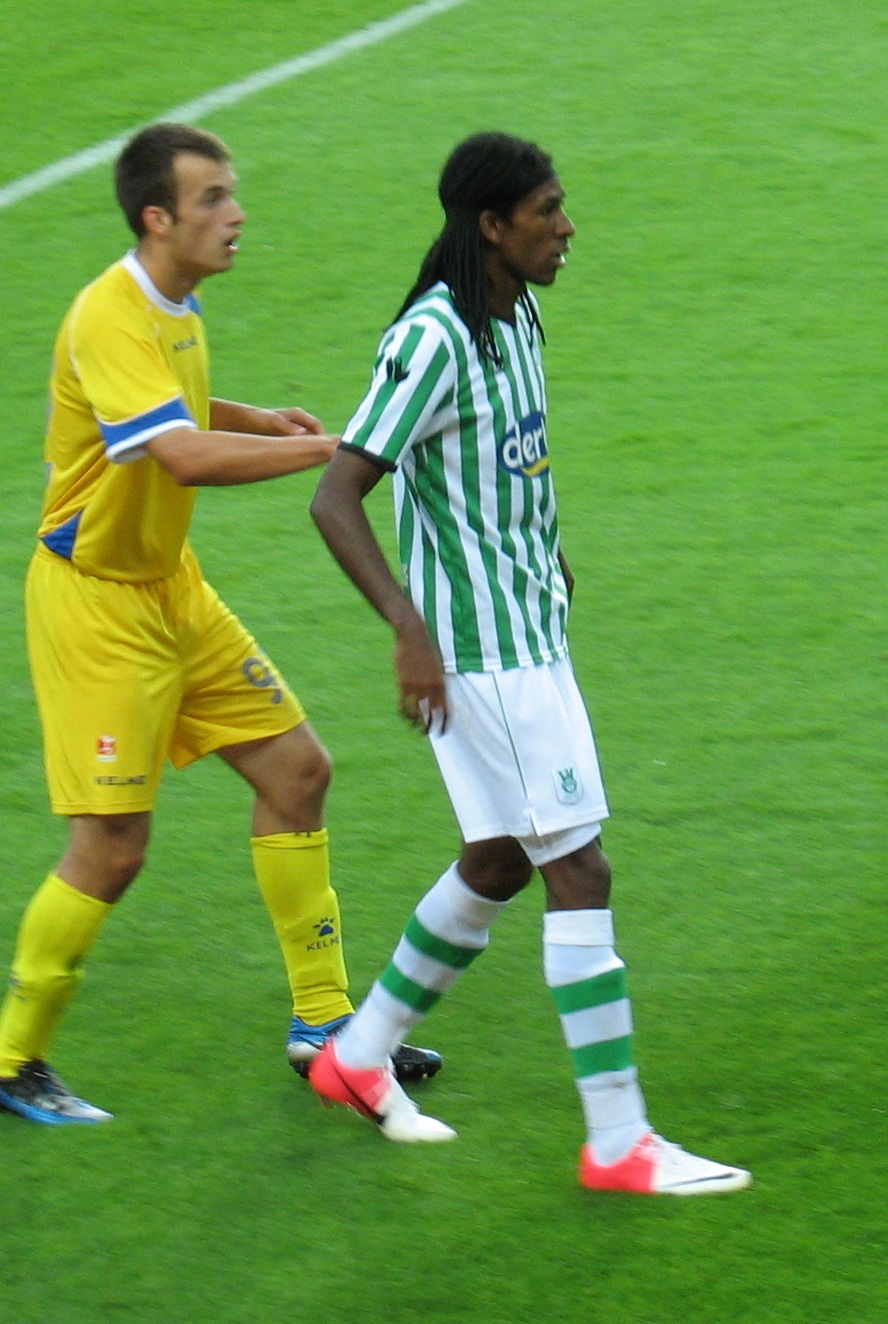

Personal information
- Full name: Franklin William Vicente
- Date of birth: 12 June 1989 (age 37)
- Place of birth: São Paulo, Brazil
- Height: 1.80 m (5 ft 11 in)
- Position: Striker

Team information
- Current team: Bangkok
- Number: 9

Senior career*
Years	Team	Apps	(Gls)
2007–2010	Figueirense FC		
2009	→ São Bento (loan)		
2009	→ Botafogo-DF (loan)		
2010	→ Tombense (loan)		
2010–2012	Gorica	45	(7)
2012–2014	Olimpija Ljubljana	30	(4)
2013	→ Celje (loan)	9	(0)
2016–	Uberlândia	3	(0)
- * Club domestic league appearances and goals as of 30 March 2014

Franklin William Vicente (born 12 June 1989 in São Paulo) is a Brazilian footballer who plays as a striker. Vicente played for a number of Brazilian football clubs before coming to Slovenia. In 2010, he signed for Gorica. He made 45 appearances and scored 7 goals in the Slovenian PrvaLiga. In 2012, he signed for Olimpija.
