= Junior Etémé Mbatama =

Cameroonian footballer

Junior Etémé
Personal information
- Full name: Junior Etémé Mbatama
- Place of birth: Douala, Cameroon
- Position: Midfielder

Team information
- Current team: Seraing

Senior career*
Years	Team	Apps	(Gls)
2010–2013	Sochaux II	37	(1)
2013–2014	Olimpija Ljubljana	19	(1)
2016–	Seraing	12	(0)

International career
- Cameroon U17
- * Club domestic league appearances and goals as of 20 February 2017

Junior Etémé Mbatama (born 21 November 1992) is a Cameroonian footballer, who plays as a midfielder.
