= Gregor Režonja =

Slovenian footballer

Personal information
- Date of birth: 15 January 1981 (age 45)
- Place of birth: Ljubljana, SFR Yugoslavia
- Position: Midfielder

Senior career*
Years	Team	Apps	(Gls)
–2003	Grosuplje		
2003–2005	Ljubljana	47	(5)
2005	Svoboda	2	(1)
2005–2007	Panetolikos	19	(5)
2008–2009	Celje	7	(0)
2009	Bela Krajina	6	(0)
2010–2012	Aluminij	68	(19)
2013	Krka	5	(0)
2013	USV Wies		
2014	SD Marjeta		
2015	SV Suddendorf-Samern	6	(0)
- * Club domestic league appearances and goals as of 18 April 2013

Gregor Režonja (born 15 January 1981) is a Slovenian retired footballer who played as a midfielder.
