= Ernest Grvala =

Slovenian footballer

Personal information
- Date of birth: 11 October 1996 (age 30)
- Place of birth: Jesenice, Slovenia
- Height: 1.78 m (5 ft 10 in)
- Position: Attacking midfielder

Team information
- Current team: TWL Elektra
- Number: 10

Youth career
- 2002–2008: Jesenice
- 2008–2014: Triglav Kranj
- 2014–2015: Domžale

Senior career*
Years	Team	Apps	(Gls)
2013–2014	Triglav Kranj	6	(1)
2014–2017	Domžale	9	(0)
2015–2016	→ Radomlje (loan)	5	(0)
2016–2017	→ Dob (loan)	25	(6)
2017–2018	Radomlje	22	(10)
2018	GOŠK Gabela	3	(0)
2019	Arda Kardzhali	3	(0)
2019–2020	Triglav Kranj	1	(0)
2020	SAK Klagenfurt	0	(0)
2020	SC Pinkafeld	8	(2)
2021	Blau-Weiss Großweikersdorf	9	(0)
2022–2025	SV Sankt Margarethen	107	(47)
2026–	TWL Elektra	13	(0)

International career
2011–2012	Slovenia U16	8	(0)
2014	Slovenia U19	4	(0)
- * Club domestic league appearances and goals as of 28 June 2026

Ernest Grvala (born 11 October 1996) is a Slovenian footballer who plays as an attacking midfielder for Austrian club TWL Elektra.
