= Kenan Horić =

Bosnian footballer

Personal information
- Date of birth: 13 September 1990 (age 36)
- Place of birth: Zenica, SFR Yugoslavia
- Height: 1.90 m (6 ft 3 in)
- Position: Centre-back

Team information
- Current team: Čelik Zenica
- Number: 4

Youth career
- –2010: Čelik Zenica

Senior career*
Years	Team	Apps	(Gls)
2009–2014	Čelik Zenica	88	(2)
2014–2016	Domžale	73	(1)
2016–2019	Antalyaspor	9	(0)
2017–2018	→ Pafos (loan)	22	(0)
2019	Mladost Doboj Kakanj	24	(1)
2020	Čelik Zenica	1	(0)
2020–2021	Kukësi	7	(0)
2021	Olimpik	12	(1)
2021–2023	Posušje	37	(1)
2023–	Čelik Zenica	63	(5)
- * Club domestic league appearances and goals as of 31 October 2026

Kenan Horić (born 13 September 1990) is a Bosnian professional footballer who plays as a centre-back for Bosnian Premier League club Čelik Zenica.

== Career statistics ==
=== Club ===
As of match played 31 October 2026

Appearances and goals by club, season and competition
Club	Season	League			National cup (Note: Includes Bosnian Cup, Slovenian Cup, Turkish Cup, Albanian Cup)		Continental		Total	
Club	Season	Division	Apps	Goals	Apps	Goals	Apps	Goals	Apps	Goals
Čelik Zenica	2009–10	Bosnian Premier League	5	0	–		–		5	0
Čelik Zenica	2010–11	Bosnian Premier League	15	0	4	0	–		19	0
Čelik Zenica	2011–12	Bosnian Premier League	25	1	0	0	–		25	1
Čelik Zenica	2012–13	Bosnian Premier League	27	1	2	0	–		29	1
Čelik Zenica	2013–14	Bosnian Premier League	16	0	3	1	–		19	1
Čelik Zenica	Total		88	2	9	1	–		97	3
Domžale	2013–14	Slovenian PrvaLiga	14	0	–		–		14	0
Domžale	2014–15	Slovenian PrvaLiga	29	1	4	0	–		33	1
Domžale	2015–16	Slovenian PrvaLiga	30	0	4	0	2 (Note: Appearances in UEFA Europa League)	0	36	0
Domžale	2016–17	Slovenian PrvaLiga	0	0	–		6	1	6	1
Domžale	Total		73	1	8	0	8	1	89	2
Antalyaspor	2016–17	Süper Lig	9	0	1	0	–		10	0
Pafos (loan)	2017–18	Cypriot First Division	22	0	–		–		22	0
Mladost Doboj Kakanj	2018–19	Bosnian Premier League	10	0	–		–		10	0
Mladost Doboj Kakanj	2019–20	Bosnian Premier League	14	1	1	0	–		15	1
Mladost Doboj Kakanj	Total		24	1	1	0	–		25	1
Čelik Zenica	2019–20	Bosnian Premier League	1	0	–		–		1	0
Kukësi	2020–21	Kategoria Superiore	7	0	1	0	2	0	10	0
Olimpik	2020–21	Bosnian Premier League	12	1	–		–		12	1
Posušje	2021–22	Bosnian Premier League	15	0	–		–		15	0
Posušje	2022–23	Bosnian Premier League	22	1	2	0	–		24	1
Posušje	Total		37	1	2	0	–		39	1
Čelik Zenica	2023–24	First League of the FBiH	12	1	1	0	–		13	1
Čelik Zenica	2024–25	First League of the FBiH	18	4	3	0	–		21	4
Čelik Zenica	2025–26	First League of the FBiH	23	0	1	0	–		24	0
Čelik Zenica	2026–27	Bosnian Premier League	10	0	0	0	–		10	0
Čelik Zenica	Total		63	5	5	0	–		68	5
Career total			336	11	27	1	10	1	373	13
