= Nikola Nikezić =

Montenegrin footballer

Personal information
- Full name: Nikola Nikezić
- Date of birth: 13 June 1981 (age 45)
- Place of birth: Titograd, SR Montenegro, SFR Yugoslavia
- Height: 1.89 m (6 ft 2 1/2 in)
- Position: Forward

Senior career*
Years	Team	Apps	(Gls)
2000–2002	Budućnost Podgorica	46	(0)
2002	→ Bokelj (loan)	15	(1)
2002–2004	Sutjeska Nikšić	73	(25)
2005–2006	Domžale	24	(10)
2006–2007	Gorica	30	(22)
2007–2009	Le Havre	46	(14)
2010	Kuban Krasnodar	32	(4)
2012–2013	Olimpija Ljubljana	43	(18)
2014	Chainat Hornbill	16	(4)
Total		325	(98)

International career^{‡}
2001	FR Yugoslavia U21	2	(0)
2003	Serbia and Montenegro U21	1	(0)
2004	Serbia and Montenegro U23	2	(0)
2007	Montenegro	1	(0)
- * Club domestic league appearances and goals as of 26 October 2013 ‡ National team caps and goals as of 8 October 2008

Nikola Nikezić (Cyrillic: Никола Никезић, pronounced [nǐkola nǐkezit͡ɕ]; born 13 June 1981) is a Montenegrin former professional footballer.

== Club career ==
He also played for Domžale and Gorica in the Slovenian PrvaLiga and FK Budućnost Podgorica and FK Sutjeska Nikšić in the First League of Serbia and Montenegro. On 15 March 2010 Nikezic ended his experience with Le Havre AC, the striker decided to quit the French team and signed a deal with the Russian side FC Kuban Krasnodar. His contract with Kuban was supposed to run until November 2011. However, in early 2011, FC Kuban decided they want to buy different players in his position and tried to force him to dissolve the contract by mutual consent. When he refused, he was beaten up by unknown persons, allegedly with ties to the Russian mafia, at the club office to force him to sign the contract dissolution papers. After being beaten for 20 minutes, by two armed men, he did sign the paperwork. He filed a complaint with FIFA president Sepp Blatter couple of days after the incident, with attached photos of bruises sustained during the beating. Eventually FIFPro (International Federation of Professional Footballers), with the assistance of Russian Football Union, forced the club to pay Nikezić a compensation of 180,000 euros.

== International career ==
He was part of the Serbia and Montenegro squad at the 2004 Summer Olympics, that exited in the first round, finishing fourth in Group C behind gold-medal winners Argentina, Australia and Tunisia. He made his senior debut for Montenegro as a late substitute in an October 2007 friendly match against Estonia. It remained his sole international appearance.
