= Adnan Bešić =

Slovenian footballer

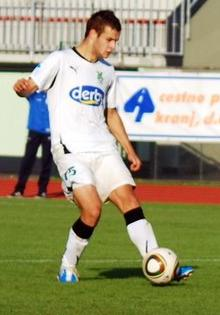

Personal information
- Full name: Adnan Bešić
- Date of birth: 28 March 1991 (age 35)
- Place of birth: Postojna, SFR Yugoslavia
- Height: 1.85 m (6 ft 1 in)
- Position: Striker

Team information
- Current team: SVG Bleiburg
- Number: 9

Youth career
- 1998–2006: Cerknica
- 2006–2008: Domžale

Senior career*
Years	Team	Apps	(Gls)
2008–2010	Domžale	7	(1)
2010–2013	Olimpija Ljubljana	62	(10)
2012	→ Aluminij (loan)	13	(1)
2013	→ Krka (loan)	16	(1)
2014–	SVG Bleiburg	233	(114)

International career
2006–2007	Slovenia U16	6	(1)
2007–2008	Slovenia U17	9	(4)
2009	Slovenia U19	2	(1)
2010–2011	Slovenia U21	2	(0)
- * Club domestic league appearances and goals as of 4 August 2023

Adnan Bešić (born 28 March 1991) is a Slovenian footballer who plays for Kärntner Liga side SVG Bleiburg.
