= Matic Fink =

Slovenian footballer

Personal information
- Date of birth: 27 February 1990 (age 36)
- Place of birth: Ljubljana, SFR Yugoslavia
- Height: 1.75 m (5 ft 9 in)
- Position: Full-back

Team information
- Current team: Ilirija 1911

Youth career
- –2004: Olimpija
- 2004: Domžale
- 2005–2009: Factor / Interblock

Senior career*
Years	Team	Apps	(Gls)
2009–2011	Interblock	41	(6)
2011–2016	Olimpija Ljubljana	118	(2)
2016–2019	Çaykur Rizespor	15	(0)
2017–2018	→ Cracovia (loan)	20	(2)
2019	Boluspor	10	(0)
2019–2020	Domžale	14	(1)
2020–2022	Olimpija Ljubljana	26	(0)
2024–	Ilirija 1911	0	(0)

International career
2007	Slovenia U17	3	(0)
2009	Slovenia U19	6	(1)
2010	Slovenia U20	1	(0)
2010–2012	Slovenia U21	6	(1)
- * Club domestic league appearances and goals as of 16 February 2024

Matic Fink (born 27 February 1990) is a Slovenian footballer who plays as a defender for Ilirija 1911.

== Honours ==
Olimpija Ljubljana

- Slovenian PrvaLiga: 2015–16
- Slovenian Cup: 2020–21
