= Dinnyuy Kongnyuy =

Cameroonian footballer

Personal information
- Full name: Dinnyuy Kongnyuy
- Date of birth: 24 January 1988 (age 38)
- Place of birth: Kadji, Cameroon
- Height: 1.88 m (6 ft 2 in)
- Position: Attacking midfielder

Team information
- Current team: Ivančna Gorica

Youth career
- –2008: Kadji Sports Academy

Senior career*
Years	Team	Apps	(Gls)
2008	Domžale	0	(0)
2009	Celje	1	(0)
2010	Interblock	3	(0)
2010–2012	Bravo		
2011–2012	→ Črnuče (loan)	23	(12)
2012–2014	Triglav Kranj	41	(3)
2014–2015	Ivančna Gorica	20	(7)
2015–?	Komenda		
2023-	Ivančna Gorica		
- * Club domestic league appearances and goals as of 31 August 2015

Dinnyuy Kongnyuy (born 24 January 1988 in Kadji, Jakiri Kumbo province) is a professional Cameroonian footballer who plays for Ivančna Gorica.

== Career ==
Kongnyuy began his career in Kadji Sports Academy and joined Domžale in July 2008, where he did not play any matches and left the club. On 8 January 2009 he moved to Celje. In the summer of 2012, he joined Slovenian top flight side Triglav Kranj.
