= Boban Jović =

Slovenian footballer

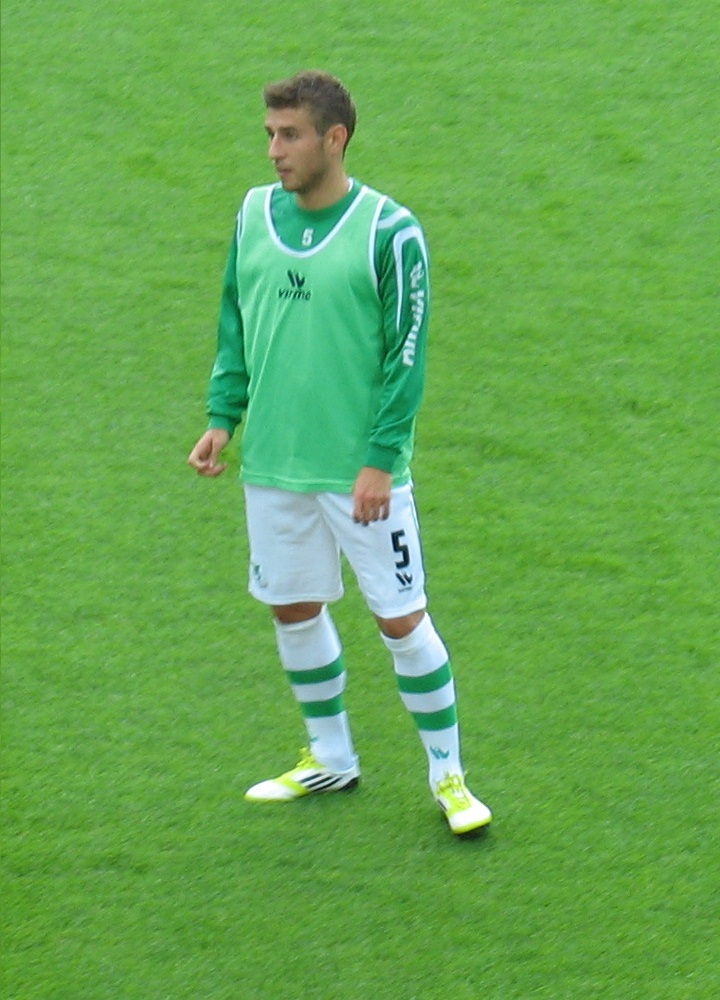

Personal information
- Date of birth: 25 June 1991 (age 35)
- Place of birth: Celje, Slovenia
- Height: 1.78 m (5 ft 10 in)
- Position: Right-back

Youth career
- Šampion
- –2009: Aluminij
- 2009–2010: Olimpija Ljubljana

Senior career*
Years	Team	Apps	(Gls)
2009	Aluminij	11	(1)
2009–2015	Olimpija Ljubljana	150	(10)
2015–2017	Wisła Kraków	61	(1)
2017–2019	Bursaspor	6	(0)
2017–2018	→ Śląsk Wrocław (loan)	3	(0)
Total		231	(12)

International career
2006–2007	Slovenia U16	7	(0)
2007–2008	Slovenia U17	10	(0)
2009	Slovenia U19	4	(0)
2010–2012	Slovenia U21	13	(0)
2016	Slovenia	4	(0)
- * Club domestic league appearances and goals

Boban Jović (born 25 June 1991) is a Slovenian former professional footballer who played as a right-back.

== Club career ==
Jović started playing football at his local club Šampion, but moved to Aluminij in his teens. Even though he was playing in Slovenian second division, he was part of the under-19 national team, which qualified for the 2009 European Championship.

After the tournament, Jović moved to Olimpija Ljubljana and played 16 games in the 2009–10 season, mainly as a defensive midfielder. He became an indispensable member of the team during the next season, playing 30 games and starting to make the right back position his own.

On 8 August 2017 he was loaned from Bursaspor to Śląsk Wrocław.

In November 2019, Jović announced his retirement from professional football.

== International career ==
Jović made his senior debut for Slovenia on 30 May 2016 in a goalless draw against Sweden.
