= Uroš Rošer =

Slovenian footballer

Personal information
- Date of birth: 27 June 1986 (age 40)
- Place of birth: SFR Yugoslavia
- Height: 1.72 m (5 ft 8 in)
- Position: Midfielder

Team information
- Current team: SV Eitweg
- Number: 6

Senior career*
Years	Team	Apps	(Gls)
–2008	Rudar Velenje	17	(0)
2008–2011	Dravinja	51	(7)
2011–2014	Rudar Velenje	75	(4)
2015	SAK Klagenfurt	13	(0)
2015	SK Kühnsdorf	16	(0)
2016-2019	ASKÖ St.Michael/Bleiburg	103	(10)
2020-	SV Eitweg	76	(8)
- * Club domestic league appearances and goals as of 12 January 2024

Uroš Rošer (born 27 June 1986) is a Slovenian football midfielder who plays for SV Eitweg.
