= Anže Zorc =

Slovenian footballer

Personal information
- Full name: Anže Zorc
- Date of birth: 6 February 1994 (age 32)
- Place of birth: Kranj, Slovenia
- Position: Midfielder

Team information
- Current team: USC Schäffern
- Number: 5

Youth career
- 1999–2002: Šmartno
- 2002–2008: Interblock
- 2008–2013: Olimpija Ljubljana

Senior career*
Years	Team	Apps	(Gls)
2011–2016	Olimpija Ljubljana	31	(3)
2014–2016	→ Radomlje (loan)	33	(3)
2016	Radomlje	9	(0)
2016–2017	Deutschlandsberger SC	23	(0)
2017–2018	Bravo	25	(3)
2018–2019	SC Loipersdorf	24	(3)
2019–	USC Schäffern	79	(11)

International career
2011–2012	Slovenia U18	10	(0)
2012	Slovenia U19	5	(0)
- * Club domestic league appearances and goals as of 16 February 2024

Anže Zorc (born 6 February 1994) is a football midfielder from Slovenia. He plays for USC Schäffern in Austria's 5th tier.
