= Zeni Husmani =

Macedonian footballer (born 1990)

Personal information
- Date of birth: 28 November 1990 (age 35)
- Place of birth: Čegrane, SR Macedonia, Yugoslavia
- Height: 1.74 m (5 ft 9 in)
- Position: Midfielder

Youth career
- –2005: Dinara Knin
- 2005–2009: Šibenik

Senior career*
Years	Team	Apps	(Gls)
2008–2012	Šibenik	76	(0)
2012–2018	Domžale	139	(7)
2018–2019	Giresunspor	12	(0)
2019	Shkëndija	9	(0)
2020–2024	Domžale	111	(5)
2024–2025	Gostivar	28	(0)
2025–	Tritium Calcio 1908		

International career
2011–2012	Macedonia U21		
- * Club domestic league appearances and goals as of 1 June 2025

Zeni Husmani (Macedonian: Зени Хусмани; born 28 November 1990) is a Macedonian footballer who plays as a midfielder.

== Biography ==
Husmani was born in Čegrane (present day North Macedonia) and moved to Croatia after his father accepted a job in Knin when Husmani was seven years old, together with his mother, brother and sister.

== Honours ==
Domžale

- Slovenian Cup: 2016–17
