= Anže Jelar =

Slovenian footballer

Personal information
- Date of birth: 18 August 1991 (age 35)
- Place of birth: Kranj, Slovenia
- Height: 1.81 m (5 ft 11 in)
- Position: Forward

Team information
- Current team: DSG Sele Zell
- Number: 9

Youth career
- Britof
- Kranj
- Triglav Kranj

Senior career*
| Years | Team | Apps | (Gls) |
| 2008–2013 | Triglav Kranj | 104 | (12) |
| 2013–2015 | Domžale | 34 | (1) |
| 2015–2016 | SC Pinkafeld | 30 | (8) |
| 2016–2017 | ASK Rotenturm | 43 | (43) |
| 2018–2019 | ATUS Ferlach | 38 | (14) |
| 2019– | DSG Sele Zell | 101 | (74) |

International career
| 2009 | Slovenia U19 | 2 | (0) |
| 2011 | Slovenia U21 | 1 | (0) |
- * Club domestic league appearances and goals as of 3 November 2023

Anže Jelar (born 18 August 1991) is a Slovenian footballer who plays as a forward for DSG Sele Zell.
