= Amedej Vetrih =

Slovenian footballer

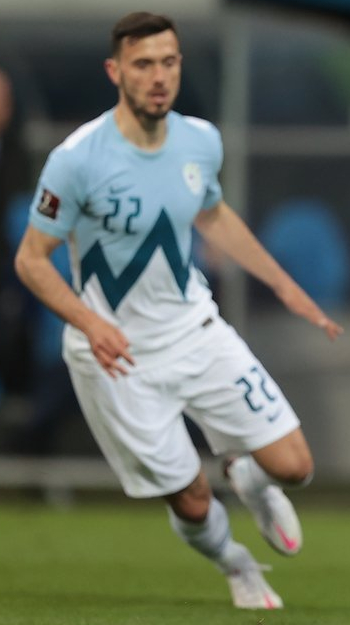
- Vetrih with Slovenia in 2021

Personal information
- Date of birth: 16 September 1990 (age 36)
- Place of birth: Vitovlje, SFR Yugoslavia
- Height: 1.81 m (5 ft 11 in)
- Position: Midfielder

Youth career
- –2009: Gorica

Senior career*
Years	Team	Apps	(Gls)
2008–2014	Gorica	79	(6)
2009–2010	→ Brda (loan)	11	(3)
2014–2015	Parma	0	(0)
2014–2015	→ Gorica (loan)	31	(5)
2015–2019	Domžale	94	(14)
2019–2020	Çaykur Rizespor	26	(0)
2020–2022	Gaziantep	41	(1)
Total		282	(29)

International career
2009	Slovenia U19	1	(0)
2017–2019	Slovenia B	3	(0)
2017–2021	Slovenia	13	(0)
- * Club domestic league appearances and goals

Amedej Vetrih (born 16 September 1990) is a Slovenian retired professional footballer who played as a midfielder.

== Club career ==
Vetrih was signed by Italian club Parma in a two-year deal in summer 2014 from Gorica. He immediately returned to Nova Gorica in a temporary deal.

On 25 June 2015, Vetrih became a free agent after the bankruptcy of Parma.

In summer 2015, Vetrih joined Domžale on a two-year deal.

== International career ==
Vetrih made his debut for Slovenia on 1 September 2017 in a World Cup qualification match against Slovakia and earned a total of 13 caps, scoring no goals. His final international game was in March 2021 against Russia.
