= List of Slovenian football transfers summer 2016 =

This is a list of Slovenian football transfers for the summer in 2016–17. Only moves from Slovenian PrvaLiga are listed.

The summer transfer window began in June/July 2016. The window closed in August/September 2016.

== Slovenian PrvaLiga ==
=== Aluminij ===
In:

Out:

Pos.	Name	Moving from	Type	Transfer fee	Ref.
GK	(Slovenia) Martin Cvetič	Paloma	Loan return	Free	
DF	(Slovenia) David Lonzarić	Drava Ptuj	Loan return	Free	
DF	(Serbia) Nemanja Jakšić	Zavrč	Transfer	Free	
FW	(Slovenia) Blaž Kramer	Šampion	Transfer	Free	
DF	(Croatia) Josip Zeba	(Croatia) Segesta	Transfer	Free	
DF	(Slovenia) Marko Roškar	Drava Ptuj	Transfer	Free	
FW	(Croatia) Toni Petrović	(Croatia) Međimurje	Transfer	Free	
DF	(Slovenia) Žan Florjanc	Maribor	Transfer	Free	
MF	(Albania) Francesco Tahiraj	Zavrč	Transfer	Free	
GK	(Slovenia) Tadej Ponudič	Maribor	Loan	Free	
DF	(Slovenia) Tim Vorše	Maribor	Loan	Free	
MF	(Slovenia) Milan Kocić	Free agent	Transfer	Free	

Pos.	Name	Moving to	Type	Transfer fee	Source
DF	(Slovenia) Sandi Čeh	Free agent	Transfer	Free	
DF	(Slovenia) Denis Topolovec	Free agent	Transfer	Free	
DF	(Slovenia) David Lonzarić	Zavrč	Transfer	Free	
FW	(Slovenia) Mitja Križan	Free agent	Transfer	Free	
FW	(Slovenia) Denis Vezjak	Dravinja	Loan	Free	
FW	(Slovenia) Robert Kurež	Mura	Transfer	Free	

=== Celje ===
In:

Out:

Pos.	Name	Moving from	Type	Transfer fee	Ref.
FW	(Slovenia) Blaž Zbičajnik	Dravinja	Loan return	Free	
MF	(Slovenia) Žiga Rožej	Dravograd	Loan return	Free	
DF	(Slovenia) Matic Mlakar	Šenčur	Loan return	Free	
FW	(Bosnia and Herzegovina) Irfan Hadžić	(Belgium) Royal Antwerp	Transfer	Free	
MF	(Croatia) Marin Glavaš	(Armenia) Ararat Yerevan	Transfer	Free	
FW	(Slovenia) Mitja Križan	Aluminij	Transfer	Free	
MF	(Slovenia) Tim Obrez	Ivančna Gorica	Transfer	Free	
MF	(Slovenia) Anej Lovrečič	Free agent	Transfer	Free	
DF	(Slovenia) Elvedin Džinić	Rudar Velenje	Transfer	Free	
MF	(Bosnia and Herzegovina) Amar Rahmanović	Maribor	Transfer	Free	
FW	(Slovenia) Dalibor Volaš	(Albania) Partizani Tirana	Transfer	Free	
GK	(Slovenia) Matjaž Rozman	(Croatia) Slaven Belupo	Transfer	Free	
MF	(Slovenia) Goran Cvijanović	(Kuwait) Al-Arabi SC	Transfer	Free	

Pos.	Name	Moving to	Type	Transfer fee	Source
MF	(Croatia) Marko Pajač	(Italy) Cagliari	End of contract	Free	
DF	(Slovenia) Marko Krajcer	Free agent	End of contract	Free	
MF	(Croatia) Mario Brlečić	Free agent	End of contract	Free	
GK	(Bosnia and Herzegovina) Amel Mujčinović	Retired	End of contract	Free	
MF	(Slovenia) Blaž Vrhovec	Maribor	Transfer	Undisclosed	
FW	(Nigeria) Sunny Omoregie	Maribor	Transfer	Undisclosed	
MF	(Croatia) Danijel Miškić	Olimpija Ljubljana	Transfer	Undisclosed	
	(Slovenia) Aleksander Močić	Drava Ptuj	Transfer	Free	
FW	(Bosnia and Herzegovina) Adnan Bašić	Drava Ptuj	Loan	Free	
	(Slovenia) Rok Romih	Drava Ptuj	Transfer	Free	
MF	(Slovenia) Nace Ermenc	Šmartno 1928	Loan	Free	
DF	(Slovenia) Žan Zupanc Terglav	Šmarje pri Jelšah	Transfer	Free	
MF	(Slovenia) Žiga Rožej	(Austria) SV Allerheiligen	Transfer	Free	
FW	(Croatia) Tim Kolar	Mura	Transfer	Free	
MF	(Slovenia) Gašper Hribernik	Drava Ptuj	Loan	Free	
MF	(Slovenia) Matic Leskovar	Drava Ptuj	Loan	Free	
GK	(Slovenia) Filip Lojen	Šmarje pri Jelšah	Loan	Free	
	(Slovenia) Liridon Nitaj	Šmarje pri Jelšah	Loan	Free	
MF	(Portugal) Érico Sousa	Free agent	Contract terminated	Free	
MF	(Serbia) Milan Spremo	Free agent	Contract terminated	Free	

=== Domžale ===
In:

Out:

Pos.	Name	Moving from	Type	Transfer fee	Ref.
DF	(Slovenia) Matic Zupanc	Radomlje	Loan return	Free	
DF	(Slovenia) Gal Primc	Radomlje	Loan return	Free	
FW	(Slovenia) Anže Iglič	Radomlje	Loan return	Free	
GK	(Slovenia) Žiga Frelih	Krško	Loan	Free	
DF	(Slovenia) Žan Kumer	Radomlje	Loan return	Free	
MF	(Slovenia) Ernest Grvala	Radomlje	Loan return	Free	
MF	(Slovenia) Luka Šušnjara	(Italy) Atalanta	Loan return	Free	
MF	(Slovenia) Luka Žinko	Krško	Transfer	Free	
MF	(Slovenia) Luka Volarič	Krško	Transfer	Free	
MF	(France) Benjamin Morel	(Bulgaria) Beroe	Transfer	Free	
DF	(Slovenia) Matija Širok	(Poland) Jagiellonia	Transfer	Free	
FW	(Slovenia) Elvis Bratanović	(Czech Republic) Teplice	Loan	Free	
MF	(Nigeria) Joel Osikel	(Nigeria) Young Eleven FC	Transfer	Undisclosed	
DF	(Slovenia) Denis Halilović	(Japan) Yokohama F.C.	Transfer	Free	
MF	(Montenegro) Veljko Batrović	Free agent	Transfer	Free	
MF	(Slovenia) Jure Matjašič	Zavrč	Transfer	Free	
MF	(Cameroon) Kombi Mandjang	(Cameroon) Union Douala	Transfer	Free	

Pos.	Name	Moving to	Type	Transfer fee	Source
DF	(Slovenia) Darko Zec	Rudar Velenje	Transfer	Free	
MF	(Slovenia) Ernest Grvala	Dob	Loan	Free	
MF	(Slovenia) Luka Šušnjara	Dob	Loan	Free	
DF	(Slovenia) Matic Zupanc	Dob	Transfer	Free	
MF	(Slovenia) Žiga Jurečič	Krško	Loan	Free	
DF	(Slovenia) Jon Gorenc Stanković	(Germany) Borussia Dortmund	Transfer	Undisclosed, alleged to be around €350,000	
MF	(Slovenia) Maj Rorič	(Italy) Inter Milan	Transfer		
DF	(Slovenia) Žan Kumer	Radomlje	Transfer	Free	
DF	(Slovenia) Gal Primc	Radomlje	Transfer	Free	
GK	(Slovenia) Anže Malnar	Rudar Velenje	Transfer	Free	
FW	(Slovenia) Dario Kolobarić	(Austria) Red Bull Salzburg	Transfer	Undisclosed	
DF	(Slovenia) Dejan Trajkovski	(Netherlands) FC Twente	Loan	Free	
DF	(Bosnia and Herzegovina) Kenan Horić	(Turkey) Antalyaspor	Transfer	Undisclosed, alleged to be around €500,000	
MF	(Bosnia and Herzegovina) Aladin Šišić	(Bosnia and Herzegovina) Mladost Doboj	Transfer	Free	
MF	(Slovenia) Matic Črnic	(Croatia) Rijeka	Transfer	Undisclosed	
MF	(Serbia) Filip Janković	Free agent	Transfer	Free	
MF	(France) Benjamin Morel	Free agent	Transfer	Free	

=== Gorica ===
In:

Out:

Pos.	Name	Moving from	Type	Transfer fee	Ref.
DF	(North Macedonia) Goran Terziev	Brda	Loan return	Free	
MF	(Slovenia) Aljaž Kanalec	Tolmin	Loan return	Free	
FW	(United States) Sachem Wilson	Adria	Transfer	Free	
MF	(Slovenia) Rok Grudina	Brda	Transfer	Free	
MF	(Italy) Gianluca Franciosi	(Italy) Este	Transfer	Free	
MF	(Slovenia) Dejan Žigon	(Poland) Olimpia Grudziądz	Transfer	Free	
FW	(Slovenia) Mark Gulič	Koper	Transfer	Free	
MF	(Slovenia) Nejc Praprotnik	Free agent	Transfer	Free	

Pos.	Name	Moving to	Type	Transfer fee	Source
FW	(Slovenia) Marko Nunić	Free agent	Contract termination	Free	
MF	(Slovenia) Dino Martinović	Free agent	End of contract	Free	
DF	(Slovenia) Nejc Mevlja	Free agent	Contract termination	Free	
MF	(Nigeria) Marshal Johnson	Free agent	Contract termination	Free	
FW	(United States) Sachem Wilson	Adria	Loan	Free	
MF	(Slovenia) Anže Kuraj	Brda	Transfer	Free	
FW	(Slovenia) Mark Gulič	Adria	Loan	Free	
MF	(Slovenia) Matija Kompara	Brda	Loan	Free	
DF	(Slovenia) Matija Kavčič	Brda	Loan	Free	
DF	(North Macedonia) Goran Terziev	Brda	Loan	Free	
MF	(Slovenia) Leon Marinič	Brda	Loan	Free	
FW	(Slovenia) Grega Debenjak	Brda	Loan	Free	
DF	(Slovenia) Žiga Tobijas	Bilje	Transfer	Free	
MF	(Slovenia) Tine Hlede	Radomlje	Transfer	Free	
MF	(Slovenia) Aljaž Kanalec	Tolmin	Transfer	Free	
GK	(Slovenia) Jure Lipičar	Bilje	Loan	Free	
MF	(Slovenia) Nejc Praprotnik	Ajdovščina	Loan	Free	

=== Koper ===
In:

Out:

Pos.	Name	Moving from	Type	Transfer fee	Ref.
GK	(Slovenia) Vasja Simčič	Tolmin	Loan return	Free	
MF	(Slovenia) Marko Krivičić	(Italy) Bologna	Loan return	Free	
DF	(Slovenia) Matic Reja	Ankaran	Loan return	Free	
MF	(Slovenia) Nik Mršić	Ankaran	Loan return	Free	
MF	(Slovenia) Žan Nikolič	Ankaran	Loan return	Free	
DF	(Slovenia) Timotej Mate	Ankaran	Loan return	Free	
MF	(Slovenia) Matej Pučko	(Spain) Osasuna	Loan return	Free	
MF	(Slovenia) Robi Obrstar	Dekani	Loan return	Free	
FW	(Slovenia) Luka Vekić	Ankaran	Loan return	Free	
DF	(Slovenia) Matic Paljk	(Italy) Spezia	Transfer	Free	
MF	(Bosnia and Herzegovina) Senijad Ibričić	(Iran) Sepahan	Transfer	Free	
DF	(Croatia) Šime Gregov	Krško	Transfer	Free	
FW	(Netherlands) Joël Tshibamba	Free agent	Transfer	Free	
MF	(Argentina) Leandro Teijo	Free agent	Transfer	Free	
GK	(Croatia) Marijan Antolović	(Israel) Hapoel Haifa	Transfer	Free	
FW	(Slovenia) Žan Bračko	(Austria) USV Siebing	Transfer	Free	
DF	(Slovenia) Gregor Sikošek	Krško	Transfer	Free	
MF	(Croatia) Jakov Biljan	(Croatia) Dinamo Zagreb	Transfer	Free	
MF	(Ghana) Courage Pekuson	(United Arab Emirates) Al Nasr SC	Transfer	Undisclosed	
MF	(Croatia) Ed Kevin Kokorović	Zavrč	Transfer	Free	
FW	(South Korea) Park In-hyeok	(Germany) TSG 1899 Hoffenheim	Loan	Free	
MF	(Panama) Ricardo Ávila	(Panama) Chorrillo	Loan	Free	
DF	(Croatia) Danijel Pranjić	Free agent	Transfer	Free	

Pos.	Name	Moving to	Type	Transfer fee	Source
FW	(Mali) Mademba Djibril Cissé	Free agent	Mutual agreement	Free	
GK	(Croatia) Kristijan Kahlina	Free agent	Contract termination	Free	
MF	(Croatia) Luka Leko	Free agent	Mutual agreement	Free	
MF	(Spain) Jonathan Ñíguez	(Spain) Alcoyano	Mutual agreement	Free	
DF	(Croatia) Antonio Pavić	Free agent	Mutual agreement	Free	
DF	(Slovenia) Matic Reja	Dekani	Transfer	Free	
GK	(Croatia) Vjekoslav Tomić	(Turkey) Şanlıurfaspor	End of contract	Free	
MF	(Croatia) Jakov Biljan	(Croatia) Dinamo Zagreb	End of loan	Free	
DF	(Albania) Hysen Memolla	(Italy) Hellas Verona	End of loan	Free	
MF	(Slovenia) Leo Štulac	(Italy) Venezia	Transfer	Free	
MF	(Serbia) Boris Živanović	Free agent	Transfer	Free	
FW	(Albania) Fabian Lokaj	Free agent	Transfer	Free	
MF	(Spain) Albert Riera	Free agent	Contract termination	Free	
MF	(Slovenia) Nik Mršič	(Austria) Deutschlandsberger SC	Transfer		
DF	(Croatia) Luka Batur	Free agent	Transfer	Free	
FW	(Slovenia) Mark Gulič	Adria	Transfer	Free	
MF	(Slovenia) Dalibor Radujko	(Italy) Monopoli 1966	Transfer	Free	
DF	(Slovenia) Timotej Mate	Ankaran	Transfer	Free	
FW	(Netherlands) Joël Tshibamba	Free agent	Contract termination	Free	
MF	(Slovenia) Žan Nikolič	Izola	Transfer	Free	
FW	(Slovenia) Žan Bračko	Free agent	Transfer	Free	

=== Krško ===
In:

Out:

Pos.	Name	Moving from	Type	Transfer fee	Ref.
DF	(Croatia) Tin Martić	(Croatia) Samobor	Loan return		
MF	(Slovenia) Marko Felja	Brežice	Loan return		
FW	(Slovenia) David Bučar	Brežice	Loan return		
FW	(Croatia) Filip Dangubić	(Croatia) Rijeka	Loan	Free	
FW	(Slovenia) Martin Kramarič	Maribor	Loan	Free	
MF	(Serbia) Ranko Moravac	Maribor	Loan	Free	
MF	(Slovenia) Dejan Vokić	Maribor	Loan	Free	
DF	(Slovenia) Damjan Vuklišević	Maribor	Loan	Free	
MF	(Slovenia) Luka Pavič	Krka	Transfer	Free	
MF	(Slovenia) Žiga Jurečič	Domžale	Loan	Free	
DF	(Slovenia) Klemen Šturm	Triglav Kranj	Transfer	Free	
FW	(Ghana) Ibrahim Mensah	Bravo	Transfer	Free	
DF	(Croatia) Marko Dušak	(Croatia) Vinogradar	Transfer	Free	
	(Slovenia) Vid Vrstovšek	Brežice	Loan	Free	
MF	(Slovenia) Nermin Haljeta	Šampion	Transfer	Free	
GK	(Slovenia) Žiga Frelih	Bravo	Transfer	Free	
MF	(Slovenia) Rok Baskera	Olimpija	Transfer	Free	
FW	(Slovenia) Roy Rudonja	Tolmin	Transfer	Free	
MF	(Slovenia) Tim Čeh	Olimpija	Loan	Free	
MF	(Bosnia and Herzegovina) Damir Sadiković	(Bosnia and Herzegovina) Željezničar	Loan	Free	
DF	(Slovenia) Robert Pušaver	Maribor	Loan	Free	
	(Slovenia) Alen Žibert	Brežice	Transfer	Free	
DF	(Slovenia) Marko Krajcer	Free agent	Transfer	Free	
FW	(Serbia) Miljan Škrbić	(Switzerland) FC Staad	Transfer	Free	
DF	(Ghana) Ebenezer Nunoo		Transfer	Free	

Pos.	Name	Moving to	Type	Transfer fee	Source
MF	(Slovenia) Dino Hotić	Maribor	End of loan	Free	
DF	(Slovenia) Robert Pušaver	Maribor	End of loan	Free	
DF	(Slovenia) Damjan Vuklišević	Maribor	End of loan	Free	
MF	(Slovenia) Luka Pavič	Krka	End of loan	Free	
MF	(Slovenia) Tim Čeh	Olimpija	End of loan	Free	
MF	(Slovenia) Luka Žinko	Domžale	Transfer	Free	
MF	(Slovenia) Luka Volarič	Domžale	Transfer	Free	
DF	(Croatia) Šime Gregov	Koper	Transfer	Free	
FW	(Slovenia) Enis Đurković	Free agent	Mutual agreement	Free	
DF	(Slovenia) Marko Jakolić	Free agent	Mutual agreement	Free	
FW	(Slovenia) David Poljanec	(Cyprus) Karmiotissa	Mutual agreement	Free	
DF	(Slovenia) Luka Hudopisk	Šampion	Transfer	Free	
DF	(Slovenia) Nik Vodeb	Zagorje	Loan	Free	
MF	(Slovenia) Jure Babnik	Brežice	Loan	Free	
MF	(Slovenia) David Božič	Brežice	Loan	Free	
MF	(Slovenia) Stanislav Turk	Brežice	Loan	Free	
DF	(Slovenia) Kadir Delić	Brežice	Loan	Free	
MF	(Slovenia) Igor Blažinčič	Brežice	Loan	Free	
DF	(Croatia) Tin Martić	Brežice	Loan	Free	
GK	(Slovenia) Žiga Frelih	Domžale	Loan	Free	
MF	(Slovenia) Marko Felja	Brežice	Loan	Free	
MF	(Slovenia) Klemen Slivšek	Free agent	Mutual agreement	Free	
DF	(Slovenia) Jure Petric	Free agent	Mutual agreement	Free	
DF	(Slovenia) Gregor Sikošek	Koper	Transfer	Free	
DF	(Croatia) Marko Perković	(Iceland) Víkingur Reykjavík	Transfer	Free	
MF	(Croatia) Luka Štefanac	(Poland) Pogoń Siedlce	Transfer	Free	

=== Maribor ===
In:

Out:

Pos.	Name	Moving from	Type	Transfer fee	Ref.
MF	(Slovenia) Dino Hotić	Krško	Loan return	Free	
DF	(Slovenia) Robert Pušaver	Krško	Loan return	Free	
FW	(Bosnia and Herzegovina) Anel Hajrić	Zarica Kranj	Loan return	Free	
DF	(Slovenia) Damjan Vuklišević	Krško	Loan return	Free	
DF	(Slovenia) Renaldo Vidovič	Veržej	Loan	Free	
FW	(Slovenia) Martin Kramarič	Krško	Loan return	Free	
DF	(Montenegro) Luka Uskoković	Zarica	Loan return	Free	
MF	(Slovenia) Chris Cener	(Austria) Rapid Wien	Transfer	Undisclosed	
FW	(Serbia) Zoran Baljak	(Serbia) Dinamo Vranje	Transfer	Free	
DF	(Slovenia) Žiga Živko	Veržej	Loan return	Free	
DF	(Slovenia) Damjan Marjanović	Krka	Loan return	Free	
DF	(Slovenia) Aleš Mejač	(Croatia) Rijeka	Loan return	Free	
MF	(Slovenia) Aleks Pihler	Zavrč	Transfer	Free	
MF	(Slovenia) Blaž Vrhovec	Celje	Transfer	Undisclosed	
FW	(Nigeria) Sunny Omoregie	Celje	Transfer	Undisclosed	
MF	(Croatia) Dejan Mezga	(Cyprus) Apollon Limassol	Transfer	Free	
FW	(Slovenia) Luka Zahović	(Netherlands) Heerenveen	Loan	Undisclosed	

Pos.	Name	Moving to	Type	Transfer fee	Source
MF	(Senegal) Welle N'Diaye	Free agent	End of contract	Free	
MF	(Montenegro) Marko Janković	(Greece) Olympiacos	End of loan	Free	
MF	(North Macedonia) Agim Ibraimi	(Kazakhstan) Astana	Transfer	Free	
MF	(Slovenia) Željko Filipović	(Belgium) Mechelen	Transfer	Undisclosed, alleged to be around €500,000	
FW	(France) Jean-Philippe Mendy	(China) Shijiazhuang	Transfer	Undisclosed, alleged to be around €2 million	
FW	(Slovenia) Martin Kramarič	Krško	Loan	Free	
MF	(Serbia) Ranko Moravac	Krško	Loan	Free	
MF	(Slovenia) Dejan Vokić	Krško	Loan	Free	
DF	(Slovenia) Damjan Vuklišević	Krško	Loan	Free	
DF	(Slovenia) Žan Florjanc	Aluminij	Transfer	Free	
GK	(Slovenia) Tadej Ponudič	Aluminij	Loan	Free	
DF	(Slovenia) Tim Vorše	Aluminij	Loan	Free	
DF	(Slovenia) Robert Pušaver	Krško	Loan	Free	
GK	(Slovenia) Tadej Trajkovski	Drava Ptuj	Loan	Free	
DF	(Slovenia) Luka Javornik	Dobrovce	Loan	Free	
MF	(Croatia) Sven Dodlek	Rudar Velenje	Transfer	Free	
MF	(Slovenia) Vid Bjedov Kobe	Zarica Kranj	Loan	Free	
FW	(Slovenia) Gregor Bajde	(Italy) Novara	Loan	Free	
MF	(Bosnia and Herzegovina) Amar Rahmanović	Celje	Transfer	Free	

=== Olimpija ===
In:

Out:

Pos.	Name	Moving from	Type	Transfer fee	Ref.
GK	(Slovenia) Rok Vodišek	Šenčur	Loan return	Free	
FW	(Slovenia) Luka Gajič	Radomlje	Loan return	Free	
MF	(Montenegro) Marko Vukčević	(Serbia) Vojvodina	Loan return	Free	
FW	(Slovenia) Tim Čeh	Krško	Loan return	Free	
DF	(Slovenia) Leo Ejup	Krka	Transfer	Free	
FW	(Slovenia) Etien Velikonja	(Wales) Cardiff City	Transfer	Free	
MF	(Slovenia) Andraž Kirm	(Cyprus) Omonia	Transfer	Free	
DF	(Serbia) Đorđe Crnomarković	(Serbia) Javor Ivanjica	Transfer	Free	
MF	(Croatia) Danijel Miškić	Celje	Transfer	Undisclosed	
FW	(Croatia) Leon Benko	(Bosnia and Herzegovina) Sarajevo	Transfer	Undisclosed	
MF	(Bosnia and Herzegovina) Anes Vazda	(Bosnia and Herzegovina) Sarajevo	Transfer	Free	
FW	(North Macedonia) Dorian Babunski	Free agent	Transfer	Free	

Pos.	Name	Moving to	Type	Transfer fee	Source
MF	(Serbia) Miroslav Radović	(Serbia) Partizan	Mutual agreement	Free	
DF	(Croatia) Hrvoje Čale	Free agent	Mutual agreement	Free	
GK	(Slovenia) Aljaž Ivačič	Radomlje	Transfer	Free	
MF	(Slovenia) Rok Baskera	Free agent	Mutual agreement	Free	
DF	(Slovenia) Matic Fink	(Turkey) Çaykur Rizespor	Mutual agreement	Free	
FW	(Slovenia) Boris Vidović	Ivančna Gorica	Loan	Free	
MF	(Slovenia) David Tijanić	Krka	Loan	Free	
FW	(Slovenia) Luka Gajič	Radomlje	Loan	Free	
	(Slovenia) Anže Cankar	Triglav Kranj	Loan	Free	
MF	(France) Martin Mimoun	Free agent	Mutual agreement	Free	
DF	(Slovenia) Adnan Hajdarević	Zarica Kranj	Loan	Free	
FW	(Slovenia) Niko Adamič	Bravo	Loan	Free	
MF	(Slovenia) Tim Čeh	Krško	Loan	Free	
DF	(Slovenia) Marko Čančar	Bravo	Loan	Free	
FW	(Slovenia) Semin Omerović	Šmartno 1928	Loan	Free	
MF	(Slovenia) Adis Ajkić	Ivančna Gorica	Loan	Free	
	(Slovenia) Adnan Abdić	Ivančna Gorica	Loan	Free	
FW	(Slovenia) Ervin Kaltak	Bravo	Loan	Free	
GK	(Slovenia) Aljon Kerec	Bravo	Loan	Free	

=== Radomlje ===
In:

Out:

Pos.	Name	Moving from	Type	Transfer fee	Ref.
FW	(Slovenia) Marko Nunić	Gorica	Transfer	Free	
GK	(Slovenia) Aljaž Ivačič	Olimpija	Transfer	Free	
DF	(Slovenia) Milan Anđelković	(Italy) Triestina	Transfer	Free	
MF	(Slovenia) Domen Jugovar	Triglav Kranj	Transfer	Free	
FW	(Slovenia) Luka Gajič	Olimpija	Loan	Free	
MF	(Slovenia) Tine Hlede	Gorica	Transfer	Free	
MF	(Japan) Jumpei Tsakamoto	(Japan) Identy Mirai	Transfer	Free	
MF	(Serbia) Filip Janković	Free agent	Transfer	Free	

Pos.	Name	Moving to	Type	Transfer fee	Source
FW	(Slovenia) Luka Gajič	Olimpija	End of loan	Free	
DF	(Slovenia) Gal Primc	Domžale	End of loan	Free	
DF	(Slovenia) Matic Zupanc	Domžale	End of loan	Free	
FW	(Slovenia) Anže Iglič	Domžale	End of loan	Free	
DF	(Slovenia) Žan Kumer	Domžale	End of loan	Free	
MF	(Slovenia) Ernest Grvala	Domžale	End of loan	Free	

=== Rudar ===
In:

Out:

Pos.	Name	Moving from	Type	Transfer fee	Ref.
GK	(Serbia) Borivoje Ristić	(Serbia) Radnik Surdulica	Transfer	Free	
DF	(Croatia) Mateo Mužek	Zavrč	Transfer	Free	
MF	(Slovenia) Nejc Plesec	Dravograd	Loan return	Free	
FW	(Croatia) Bojan Vručina	(Greece) Trikala	Transfer	Free	
DF	(France) Jean-Claude Billong	(Portugal) Leixões	Transfer	Free	
DF	(Slovenia) Darko Zec	Domžale	Transfer	Free	
FW	(Croatia) Dominik Glavina	(Croatia) Inter Zaprešić	Transfer	Free	
FW	(Cameroon) John Mary	(Serbia) Vojvodina	Transfer	Free	
GK	(Slovenia) Anže Malnar	Domžale	Transfer	Free	
MF	(Croatia) Sven Dodlek	Maribor	Transfer	Free	
FW	(Slovenia) Davor Bokalić	Bravo	Transfer	Free	

Pos.	Name	Moving to	Type	Transfer fee	Source
DF	(Croatia) Ivan Knezović	Retired	End of contract	Free	
MF	(Slovenia) Safet Gavranović	Free agent	Mutual termination	Free	
DF	(North Macedonia) Bogdan Velinovski	Free agent	Mutual termination	Free	
GK	(Slovenia) Matic Čretnik	Dob	Transfer	Free	
MF	(Palestine) Jaka Ihbeisheh	Free agent	Mutual termination	Free	
DF	(Croatia) Marin Bratić	Free agent	Mutual termination	Free	
MF	(Slovenia) Damjan Trifković	Free agent	Mutual termination	Free	
MF	(Slovenia) Milan Kocić	Free agent	Mutual termination	Free	
DF	(Slovenia) Gašper Kurež	Drava Ptuj	Transfer	Free	
MF	(Slovenia) Nejc Plesec	Korotan	Transfer	Free	
DF	(Slovenia) Elvedin Džinić	Celje	Transfer	Free	
DF	(Austria) Erman Bevab	(Austria) SC Kalsdorf	Transfer	Free	
MF	(Croatia) Mario Babić	(Belgium) Tubize	Transfer	Free	
