= 2015–16 NK Krško season =

NK Krško
2015–16 season
- President: Boštjan Blažinčič
- Head Coach: Tomaž Petrovič
- Stadium: Matija Gubec Stadium
- Slovenian League: 6th
- Top goalscorer: League: Luka Volarič (4) & David Poljanec (4); All: Luka Volarič (4) & David Poljanec (4)
- Highest home attendance: 2,400 (vs Olimpija and Maribor)
- Lowest home attendance: 550 (vs Celje)
- Average home league attendance: 1,292
Home colours	Away colours	Third colours
- All statistics correct as of 25 May 2016.

The 2015–16 season was Krško's 1st season in the Slovenian PrvaLiga, Slovenian top division.

== Players ==
As of 1 March 2016.

Note: Flags indicate national team as defined under FIFA eligibility rules; some limited exceptions apply. Players may hold more than one non-FIFA nationality.

No.	Pos.	Nation	Player
1	GK	SLO	Marko Zalokar
3	DF	SLO	Aleš Kožar
4	DF	SLO	Jure Petric
6	DF	SLO	Jure Špiler
7	MF	SLO	Luka Volarič
8	MF	SLO	Žiga Jurečič
9	FW	SLO	David Poljanec
10	MF	SLO	Klemen Slivšek
12	DF	SLO	Gregor Sikošek
13	GK	SLO	Jan Račič
15	MF	SLO	Dejan Urbanč
16	DF	SLO	Damjan Vuklišević
17	MF	CRO	Luka Štefanac
19	MF	SLO	Miha Drnovšek (captain)

No.	Pos.	Nation	Player
20	MF	SLO	Luka Pavič
22	DF	CRO	Marko Perković
23	MF	SLO	Igor Blažinčič
26	DF	CRO	Šime Gregov
28	FW	SLO	Tim Čeh
30	DF	SLO	Marko Jakolić
33	FW	SLO	Dejan Rusič
45	DF	SLO	Robert Pušaver
70	MF	SLO	Luka Žinko
89	FW	SLO	Enis Đurković
90	FW	CRO	Petar Petranić
97	MF	SLO	Martin Kramarič
98	MF	SLO	Dino Hotič
99	MF	SLO	Benjamin Levak

Source:NK Krško

== Competitions ==
=== Overall ===
Competition	Started round	Current position / round	Final position / round	First match	Last match
PrvaLiga	—	—	6th	19 July 2015	21 May 2016

Updated to match played 25 May 2016
Source: Competitions

=== Overview ===
Competition	Record							
Competition	G	W	D	L	GF	GA	GD	Win %
PrvaLiga	36	10	11	15	24	48	−24	27.78
Total	36	10	11	15	24	48	−24	27.78

Updated to match played 25 May 2016
Source: Competitions

=== League table ===
Pos	Team	Pld	W	D	L	GF	GA	GD	Pts	Qualification or relegation
4	Gorica	36	15	7	14	48	49	−1	52	Qualification for the Europa League first qualifying round
5	Celje	36	11	12	13	32	46	−14	45	
6	Krško	36	10	11	15	24	48	−24	41 (Note: Krško ahead of Rudar Velenje on head-to-head record: Rudar–Krško 1–1, Krško–Rudar 0–0, Rudar–Krško 0–1, Krško–Rudar 1–1.)	
7	Rudar Velenje	36	11	8	17	34	52	−18	41	
8	Koper	36	11	7	18	40	54	−14	40 (Note: Koper ahead of Zavrč on head-to-head record: Zavrč–Koper 1–0, Koper–Zavrč 3–1, Zavrč–Koper 1–3, Koper–Zavrč 1–0.)	

Source: Slovenian PrvaLiga (in Slovene), Soccerway
Rules for classification: 1) Points; 2) Head-to-head points; 3) Head-to-head goal difference; 4) Head-to-head goals scored; 5) Goal difference; 6) Goals scored.

=== Results summary ===
Overall								Home						Away					
Pld	W	D	L	GF	GA	GD	Pts	W	D	L	GF	GA	GD	W	D	L	GF	GA	GD
36	10	11	15	24	48	−24	41	5	6	7	12	16	−4	5	5	8	12	32	−20

Last updated: 25 May 2016.
Source: Competitive matches

=== Results by round ===
Round	1	2	3	4	5	6	7	8	9	10	11	12	13	14	15	16	17	18	19	20	21	22	23	24	25	26	27	28	29	30	31	32	33	34	35	36
Ground	H	H	A	H	A	H	A	H	A	A	A	H	A	H	A	H	A	H	H	H	A	H	A	H	A	H	A	A	A	H	A	H	A	H	A	H
Result	W	W	L	L	D	D	L	L	L	D	L	L	L	D	L	W	D	D	D	L	L	W	W	W	L	L	W	W	W	L	W	D	D	L	D	D
Position	4	1	4	6	6	6	7	8	9	8	9	9	9	9	10	9	9	10	10	10	10	10	10	9	10	10	9	7	7	7	7	7	6	8	8	6

Updated to match(es) played on 25 May 2016. Source: Competitive matches
A = Away; H = Home; W = Win; D = Draw; L = Loss

==== Matches ====
Win Draw Loss

19 July 2015 1	Krško	1 – 0	Celje	Krško
18:30 CEST (UTC+02:00)	Rujovič 39' (pen.); Đukić (yellow card) 56'	Report (in Slovene)	Travner (yellow card) 26' (yellow-red card) 60'; Vrhovec (yellow card) 37' (yellow-red card) 90'; Mujčinović (yellow card) 41'; Ahmedi (yellow card) 61'; Firer (yellow card) 77'	Stadium: Matija Gubec Stadium; Attendance: 1,600; Referee: Matej Jug

26 July 2015 2	Krško	1 – 0	Koper	Krško
18:30 CEST (UTC+02:00)	Štefanac (yellow card) 27'; Poljanec 32'	Report (in Slovene)	Rahmanović (yellow card) 35'; Galešić (yellow card) 36'; Štromajer (yellow card) 90+2'	Stadium: Matija Gubec Stadium; Attendance: 1,700; Referee: Slavko Vinčić

1 August 2015 3	Maribor	4 – 1	Krško	Maribor
18:30 CEST (UTC+02:00)	Mendy 6'; Vršič 14'; Gigli (yellow card) 22'; Ibraimi 46', 68'; Filipović (yellow card) 80'	Report (in Slovene)	Poljanec 60'; Petric (yellow card) 72'	Stadium: Ljudski vrt Attendance: 4,000; Referee: Mitja Žganec

8 August 2015 4	Krško	0 – 2	Olimpija	Krško
20:15 CEST (UTC+02:00)	Volarič (yellow card) 19'; Petric (yellow card) 40'; Drnovšek (yellow card) 74'	Report (in Slovene)	Barjrić (yellow card) 17'; Alves Coelho Silva (yellow card) 33', (goal) 38'; Matič (yellow card) 34'; Šporar 63'; Henty (yellow card) 70'	Stadium: Matija Gubec Stadium; Attendance: 2,400; Referee: Roman Glažar

12 August 2015 5	Rudar	1 – 1	Krško	Velenje
17:30 CEST (UTC+02:00)	Prašnikar 12'; Knezović (yellow card) 39' (yellow-red card) 45'; S.Babić (yellow card) 45' (yellow-red card) 45'; Radan (yellow card) 45'; M.Babić (yellow card) 59'; Ihbeisheh (yellow card) 71'	Report (in Slovene)	Đukić 33'; Jurečič (yellow card) 36'; Petric (yellow card) 90+2'	Stadium: Ob Jezeru City Stadium; Attendance: 1,000; Referee: Alen Borošak

15 August 2015 6	Krško	0 – 0	Krka	Krško
17:45 CEST (UTC+02:00)	Đukić (yellow card) 45'	Report (in Slovene)	Novinić (yellow card) 20'; Kastrevec (yellow card) 27'; Ejup (yellow card) 79'; Collins (yellow card) 86'	Stadium: Matija Gubec Stadium; Attendance: 1,550; Referee: Slavko Vinčić

23 August 2015 7	Gorica	3 – 1	Krško	Nova Gorica
17:00 CEST (UTC+02:00)	Nunič 17', 28', (yellow card) 20' (yellow-red card) 62'; Džuzdanović 70'	Report (in Slovene)	Urbanč 60' (pen.); Volarič (yellow card) 70'	Stadium: Nova Gorica Sports Park; Attendance: 900; Referee: Asmir Sagrković

29 August 2015 8	Krško	0 – 1	Zavrč	Krško
20:15 CEST (UTC+02:00)	Drnovšek (yellow card) 34'; Đukić (yellow card) 38'	Report (in Slovene)	Pihler (yellow card) 66'; Kokorović (yellow card) 69', (goal) 76'	Stadium: Matija Gubec Stadium; Attendance: 1,500; Referee: Matej Jug

13 September 2015 9	Domžale	2 – 0	Krško	Domžale
17:45 CEST (UTC+02:00)	Vuk 13', 63'; Morel (yellow card) 26'; Vetrih (yellow card) 67'	Report (in Slovene)	Jurečič (yellow card) 10'; Petranić (yellow card) 64'	Stadium: Domžale Sports Park; Attendance: 800; Referee: Nejc Kajtazović

18 September 2015 10	Celje	0 – 0	Krško	Celje
18:00 CEST (UTC+02:00)	Miškić (yellow card) 58'; Spremo (yellow card) 64'	Report (in Slovene)	Drnovšek (yellow card) 90'	Stadium: Arena Petrol; Attendance: 600; Referee: Dejan Balažič

23 September 2015 11	Koper	4 – 0	Krško	Koper
20:00 CEST (UTC+02:00)	Ivančić 10', (yellow card) 31'; Tomas Del Toro (yellow card) 50'; Rahmanović 55' (pen.); Štulac 79'; Vekič 90+3'; Radujko (yellow card) 30+3'	Report (in Slovene)	Jakolić (yellow card) 36'; Perkovič (yellow card) 89'	Stadium: Bonifika Stadium; Attendance: 300; Referee: Rade Obrenović

27 September 2015 12	Krško	1 – 3	Maribor	Krško
17:45 CEST (UTC+02:00)	Štefanac 6'	Report (in Slovene)	Stojanović (yellow card) 5'; Tavares (yellow card) 33'; Šuler 38', (yellow card) 57'; Vršič 71'; Kabha (yellow card) 74'; Bajde 90+4', (yellow card) 90+4'	Stadium: Matija Gubec Stadium; Attendance: 1,900; Referee: Andrej Žnidaršič

4 October 2015 13	Olimpija	5 – 0	Krško	Ljubljana
17:45 CEST (UTC+02:00)	Kelhar (yellow card) 5'; Ontivero 14', 54'; Kapun 39', 68'; Klinar (yellow card) 75'; Šporar 87' (pen.)	Report (in Slovene)	Štefanac (yellow card) 46'; Volarič (yellow card) 72'; Perkovič (yellow card) 87'	Stadium: Stožice Stadium; Attendance: 2,000; Referee: Slavko Vinčić

17 October 2015 14	Krško	0 – 0	Rudar	Krško
20:00 CEST (UTC+02:00)	Perkovič (yellow card) 55'	Report (in Slovene)	Grgić (yellow card) 38'; Kašnik (yellow card) 51'; Bolha (yellow card) 70'	Stadium: Matija Gubec Stadium; Attendance: 1,000; Referee: Mitja Žganec

25 October 2015 15	Krka	2 – 0	Krško	Novo Mesto
14:00 CET (UTC+01:00)	Dangubič 16', (yellow card) 64'; Welbeck (yellow card) 71'; Novinić 90+3'	Report (in Slovene)	Perkovič (yellow card) 7'; Žinko (yellow card) 46'; Jurečič (yellow card) 78'	Stadium: Portoval; Attendance: 600; Referee: Damir Skomina

30 October 2015 16	Krško	1 – 0	Gorica	Krško
19:00 CET (UTC+01:00)	Štefanac 17'; Jakolić (yellow card) 66'; Petranić (yellow card) 81'; Drnovšek (yellow card) 90+3'; Blažinčič (yellow card) 90+4'	Report (in Slovene)	Eleke (yellow card) 70'	Stadium: Matija Gubec Stadium; Attendance: 900; Referee: Andrej Žnidaršič

6 November 2015 17	Zavrč	1 – 1	Krško	Zavrč
18:00 CET (UTC+01:00)		Report (in Slovene)		Stadium: Zavrč Sports Park; Attendance: 550; Referee: Rade Obrenović

25 November 2015 18	Krško	1 – 1	Domžale	Krško
17:30 CET (UTC+01:00)	Čeh 61'; Volarič (yellow card) 64'; Urbanč (yellow card) 69'; Petranić (yellow card) 81'; Sikošek (yellow card) 69'	Report (in Slovene)	Mance (yellow card) 45'; Zec (yellow card) 51'; Črnic (yellow card) 75' (goal) 90'	Stadium: Matija Gubec Stadium; Attendance: 600; Referee: Dragoslav Perič

28 November 2015 19	Krško	0 – 0	Celje	Krško
15:30 CET (UTC+01:00)	Čeh (yellow card) 20'; Jurečič (yellow card) 59'	Report (in Slovene)	Kous (yellow card) 32'; Vidmajer (yellow card) 79'	Stadium: Matija Gubec Stadium; Attendance: 550; Referee: Roman Glažar

2 December 2015 20	Krško	0 – 1	Koper	Krško
16:00 CET (UTC+01:00)	Volarič (yellow card) 41'	Report (in Slovene)	Štromajer 4'; Gal (yellow card) 5'; Anđelković (yellow card) 43'; Kahlina (yellow card) 88'	Stadium: Matija Gubec Stadium; Attendance: 600; Referee: Vojko Goričan

5 December 2015 21	Maribor	6 – 0	Krško	Maribor
17:30 CET (UTC+01:00)	Mendy 7', 21', 69'; Gigli (yellow card) 16'; Bajde 27', 57', 58'	Report (in Slovene)	Pavič (yellow card) 44'; Sikošek (yellow card) 55'; Volarič (yellow card) 63'; Jakolić (yellow card) 77'	Stadium: Ljudski vrt Attendance: 2,000; Referee: Nejc Kajtazović

12 December 2015 22	Krško	2 – 1	Olimpija	Krško
17:30 CET (UTC+01:00)	Poljanec (red card) 32'; Perković (yellow card) 45'; Čeh (yellow card) 51'; Volarič 70'; Žinko 74' (pen.)	Report (in Slovene)	Kronaveter 8'; Ontivero (yellow card) 20'; Kelhar (yellow card) 68'; Klinar (yellow card) 73'	Stadium: Matija Gubec Stadium; Attendance: 700; Referee: Matej Jug

27 February 2016 23	Rudar	0 – 1	Krško	Velenje
15:00 CET (UTC+01:00)	Tolimir (yellow card) 56'; Eterović (yellow card) 71'	Report (in Slovene)	Štefanac (yellow card) 26' (yellow-red card) 57'; Volarič 63'; Žinko (yellow card) 89'	Stadium: Ob Jezeru City Stadium; Attendance: 800; Referee: Dejan Balažič

6 March 2016 24	Krško	3 – 0	Krka	Krško
15:00 CET (UTC+01:00)	Volarič 30'; Urbanč 48'; Đurković 63' (yellow card) 84'; Žinko (yellow card) 70'; Gregov (yellow card) 77'	Report (in Slovene)	Gliha (yellow card) 28'; Kostanjšek (yellow card) 47'; Ejup (yellow card) 58'	Stadium: Matija Gubec Stadium; Attendance: 1,250; Referee: Damir Skomina

12 March 2016 25	Gorica	1 – 0	Krško	Nova Gorica
15:00 CET (UTC+01:00)	Jogan (yellow card) 24'; Arčon (yellow card) 26'; Johnson (yellow card) 33'; Burgič 65'	Report (in Slovene)	Čeh (yellow card) 57'	Stadium: Nova Gorica Sports Park; Attendance: 450; Referee: Andrej Žnidaršič

19 March 2016 26	Krško	0 – 1	Zavrč	Krško
19:00 CET (UTC+01:00)	Sikošek (yellow card) 44'; Gregov (yellow card) 72'; Petric (yellow card) 74'	Report (in Slovene)	Cvek 16'; Golubar (yellow card) 22'; Kokorović (yellow card) 33'; Ranilović (yellow card) 70'; Tuđan (yellow card) 89'	Stadium: Matija Gubec Stadium; Attendance: 1,100; Referee: Dragoslav Perić

2 April 2016 27	Domžale	2 – 3	Krško	Domžale
19:00 CEST (UTC+02:00)	Alvir (yellow card) 23', (goal) 77'; Dobrovoljc (yellow card) 50'; Mance 83'	Report (in Slovene)	Poljanec 41', 48'; Volarič 65', (yellow card) 79'; Jakolić (yellow card) 71'	Stadium: Domžale Sports Park; Attendance: 750; Referee: Alen Borošak

6 April 2016 28	Celje	0 – 1	Krško	Celje
17:00 CEST (UTC+02:00)	Čirjak (red card) 52'; Klemenčič (yellow card) 57'; Esteves de Sousa (yellow card) 64'; Kous (yellow card) 82'	Report (in Slovene)	Đurković 35'; Štefanac (red card) 52'; Pušaver (yellow card) 79'; Hotić (yellow card) 90+4'	Stadium: Arena Petrol; Attendance: 750; Referee: Dejan Balažič

10 April 2016 29	Koper	0 – 1	Krško	Koper
19:00 CEST (UTC+02:00)	Jefthon (yellow card) 42'; Ñíguez (yellow card) 70'; Belima (yellow card) 78'; Jurina (yellow card) 83'; Lokaj (yellow card) 86'	Report (in Slovene)	Hotić 35'; Sikošek (yellow card) 39'; Pušaver (yellow card) 77'; Vuklišević (yellow card) 79'; Gregov (yellow card) 84'; Drnovšek (yellow card) 85'	Stadium: Bonifika Stadium; Attendance: 800; Referee: Mitja Žganec

17 April 2016 30	Krško	1 – 3	Maribor	Krško
16:55 CEST	Žinko 27' (pen.); Đurković (yellow card) 67'	Report (in Slovene)	Novaković 22'; Tavares (red card) 27'; Mertelj (yellow card) 63'; Mendy 66', 80'; Janković (yellow card) 83'	Stadium: Matija Gubec; Attendance: 2,400; Referee: Rade Obrenović

23 April 2016 31	Olimpija	0 – 1	Krško	Ljubljana
16:55 CEST (UTC+02:00)	Zajc (yellow card) 3'; Čale (yellow card) 45'; Bajrić (yellow card) 89'; Vidmar (yellow card) 90+3'	Report (in Slovene)	Volarič (yellow card) 31'; Vuklišević (yellow card) 33'; Čeh (yellow card) 36'; Kramarič 61'; Jakolić (yellow card) 90+2'	Stadium: Stožice Stadium; Attendance: 2,500; Referee: Matej Jug

27 April 2016 32	Krško	1 – 1	Rudar	Krško
18:00 CEST (UTC+02:00)	Vuklišević (yellow card) 15', (goal) 90+6'; Gregov (yellow card) 31'; Pušaver (yellow card) 62'	Report (in Slovene)	Eterović (yellow card) 11', (goal) 32'; Trifkovič (yellow card) 13'; S.Babić (yellow card) 35'	Stadium: Matija Gubec Stadium; Attendance: 1,300; Referee: Dragoslav Perić

7 May 2016 33	Krka	0 – 0	Krško	Novo Mesto
17:00 CEST (UTC+02:00)	Vučkič (yellow card) 41'; Kostanjšek (yellow card) 67'; Potokar (yellow card) 90+3'	Report (in Slovene)	Sikošek (yellow card) 29'; Drnovšek (yellow card) 89'	Stadium: Portoval; Attendance: 600; Referee: Nejc Kajtazović

11 May 2016 34	Krško	0 – 2	Gorica	Krško
18:00 CEST (UTC+02:00)	Volarič (yellow card) 53'; Sikošek (yellow card) 59'	Report (in Slovene)	Kotnik 11'; Celcer (yellow card) 30'; Jogan (yellow card) 53'; Boben (yellow card) 89'	Stadium: Matija Gubec Stadium; Attendance: 1,000; Referee: Damir Skomina

14 May 2016 35	Zavrč	1 – 1	Krško	Zavrč
16:55 CEST (UTC+02:00)	Gregov (yellow card) 30', (goal) 45'; Kramarič (yellow card) 32'	Report (in Slovene)	Golubar (yellow card) 36', (goal) 85'; Mužek (yellow card) 54'; Tahiraj (yellow card) 64'; Jakšić (yellow card) 81'; Rogač (yellow card) 83'	Stadium: Zavrč Sports Park; Attendance: 250; Referee: Slavko Vinčić

21 May 2016 36	Krško	0 – 0	Domžale	Krško
16:55 CEST (UTC+02:00)	Gregov (yellow card) 68'	Report (in Slovene)	Grvala (yellow card) 19'; Balkovec (yellow card) 56'	Stadium: Matija Gubec Stadium; Attendance: 1,200; Referee: Matej Jug

== Statistics ==
=== Squad statistics ===
As of matches played 21 May 2016.

No.	Pos.	Player	Total				PrvaLiga			
No.	Pos.	Player		Goal	Yellow card	Red card		Goal	Yellow card	Red card
1	GK	(Slovenia) Marko Zalokar	36	0	1	0	36	0	1	0
3	DF	(Slovenia) Aleš Kožar	7	0	0	0	7	0	0	0
4	DF	(Slovenia) Jure Petric	25	0	4	1	25	0	4	1
6	DF	(Slovenia) Jure Špiler	6	0	0	0	6	0	0	0
7	MF	(Slovenia) Luka Volarič	32	4	9	0	32	4	9	0
8	MF	(Slovenia) Žiga Jurečič	18	0	4	0	18	0	4	0
9	FW	(Slovenia) David Poljanec	32	4	0	1	32	4	0	1
10	MF	(Slovenia) Klemen Slivšek	12	0	0	0	12	0	0	0
12	DF	(Slovenia) Gregor Sikošek	32	0	7	0	32	0	7	0
13	GK	(Slovenia) Jan Račič	0	0	0	0	0	0	0	0
15	MF	(Slovenia) Dejan Urbanč	30	2	1	0	30	2	1	0
16	DF	(Slovenia) Damjan Vuklišević	9	1	3	0	9	1	3	0
17	MF	(Croatia) Luka Štefanac	25	2	3	2	25	2	3	2
19	MF	(Slovenia) Miha Drnovšek	24	0	6	0	24	0	6	0
20	MF	(Slovenia) Luka Pavič	14	0	1	0	14	0	1	0
22	DF	(Croatia) Marko Perković	13	0	5	0	13	0	5	0
23	MF	(Slovenia) Igor Blažinčič	6	0	1	0	6	0	1	0
26	DF	(Croatia) Šime Gregov	13	1	5	0	13	1	5	0
28	FW	(Slovenia) Tim Čeh	28	2	6	0	28	2	6	0
30	DF	(Slovenia) Marko Jakolić	21	0	5	0	21	0	5	0
33	FW	(Slovenia) Dejan Rusič	1	0	0	0	1	0	0	0
45	DF	(Slovenia) Robert Pušaver	12	0	3	0	12	0	3	0
70	MF	(Slovenia) Luka Žinko	22	2	3	0	22	2	3	0
89	FW	(Slovenia) Enis Đurković	12	2	2	0	12	2	2	0
90	FW	(Croatia) Petar Petranić	13	0	3	0	13	0	3	0
97	MF	(Slovenia) Martin Kramarič	6	1	1	0	6	1	1	0
98	MF	(Slovenia) Dino Hotić	13	1	1	0	13	1	1	0
99	MF	(Slovenia) Benjamin Levak	0	0	0	0	0	0	0	0
Players who left the club in Summer/Winter transfer window or on loan
–	DF	(Slovenia) Bojan Đukić	8	1	3	0	8	1	3	0
–	MF	(England) Rhema Obed	8	0	0	0	8	0	0	0
–	MF	(Slovenia) Marko Felja	1	0	0	0	1	0	0	0
–	DF	(Slovenia) Tin Martič	0	0	0	0	0	0	0	0
–	MF	(Slovenia) Enis Rujović	8	1	0	0	8	1	0	0
–	FW	(Slovenia) Slaviša Dvorančič	0	0	0	0	0	0	0	0
–	MF	(Slovenia) David Bučar	11	0	0	0	11	0	0	0
–	DF	(Slovenia) Jože Barkovič	1	0	0	0	1	0	0	0
Own goals			–	0	–	–	–	0	–	–
TOTALS			–	24	77	4	–	24	77	4

=== Goalscorers ===
As of matches played 21 May 2016.

Rank	No.	Pos.	Player	PrvaLiga	Total
1	7	MF	(Slovenia) Luka Volarič	4	4
1	9	FW	(Slovenia) David Poljanec	4	4
3	15	MF	(Slovenia) Dejan Urbanč	2	2
3	17	MF	(Croatia) Luka Štefanac	2	2
3	28	FW	(Slovenia) Tim Čeh	2	2
3	70	MF	(Slovenia) Luka Žinko	2	2
3	89	FW	(Slovenia) Enis Đurković	2	2
8	16	DF	(Slovenia) Damjan Vuklišević	1	1
8	26	DF	(Croatia) Šime Gregov	1	1
8	97	MF	(Slovenia) Martin Kramarič	1	1
8	98	MF	(Slovenia) Dino Hotić	1	1
8	–	DF	(Slovenia) Bojan Đukić	1	1
8	–	MF	(Slovenia) Enis Rujović	1	1
Own goals				0	0
TOTALS				24	24

== See also ==
- 2015–16 Slovenian PrvaLiga
