= 2015–16 NK Zavrč season =

Zavrč
2015–16 season
- President: Silvo Šterbal
- Head Coach: Slavko Matić
- Stadium: Zavrč Sports Park
- Slovenian League: 9th
- Slovenian Cup: Semi-finals
- Top goalscorer: League: Veljko Batrović (6); All: Veljko Batrović (9)
- Highest home attendance: 2,200 (vs Maribor)
- Lowest home attendance: 250 (vs Krško and Celje)
- Average home league attendance: 653
- All statistics correct as of 26 June 2016.

The 2015–16 season was Zavrč's 3rd season in the Slovenian PrvaLiga, the top Slovenian division, since the league was created.

== Players ==
As of 1 March 2016

Note: Flags indicate national team as defined under FIFA eligibility rules; some limited exceptions apply. Players may hold more than one non-FIFA nationality.

No.	Pos.	Nation	Player
1	GK	SLO	Marko Ranilovič
2	DF	CRO	Valerio Puškadija
3	DF	CRO	Tin Karamatič
4	DF	CRO	Lovro Cvek (captain)
5	DF	CRO	Davor Rogač
6	DF	CRO	Ivan Ptiček
7	MF	CRO	Josip Golubar
9	FW	SLO	Luka Šalamun
10	MF	CRO	Dejan Glavica
11	MF	SLO	Jure Matjašič
12	GK	CRO	Matija Kovačić
13	DF	CRO	Sebastijan Antić
14	MF	NGR	Ovbokha Agboyi
15	FW	CRO	Ante Solomun
17	FW	SLO	Rok Zorko

No.	Pos.	Nation	Player
19	MF	CRO	Dean Tišma
20	DF	CRO	Mateo Mužek
21	DF	SRB	Nemanja Jakšić
23	MF	SLO	Aleks Pihler
25	GK	CRO	Luka Domjan
28	MF	CRO	Patrik Tuđan
33	MF	UKR	Petro Namuilyk
35	DF	CRO	Josip Filipović
44	DF	UKR	Stanislav Shtanenko
55	DF	SRB	Matija Miketić
73	MF	ITA	Francesco Tahiraj
89	MF	SLO	Timotej Dodlek
91	FW	SVK	Filip Duriš
94	MF	MNE	Veljko Batrović
99	MF	CRO	Ed Kevin Kokorović

Source:NK Zavrč

== Competitions ==
=== PrvaLiga ===
==== League table ====
Pos	Team	Pld	W	D	L	GF	GA	GD	Pts	Qualification or relegation
6	Krško	36	10	11	15	24	48	−24	41 (Note: Krško ahead of Rudar Velenje on head-to-head record: Rudar–Krško 1–1, Krško–Rudar 0–0, Rudar–Krško 0–1, Krško–Rudar 1–1.)	
7	Rudar Velenje	36	11	8	17	34	52	−18	41	
8	Koper	36	11	7	18	40	54	−14	40 (Note: Koper ahead of Zavrč on head-to-head record: Zavrč–Koper 1–0, Koper–Zavrč 3–1, Zavrč–Koper 1–3, Koper–Zavrč 1–0.)	
9	Zavrč (R)	36	9	13	14	32	41	−9	40	Qualification for the relegation play-offs
10	Krka (R)	36	8	10	18	30	56	−26	34	Relegation to Slovenian Second League

Source: Slovenian PrvaLiga (in Slovene), Soccerway
Rules for classification: 1) Points; 2) Head-to-head points; 3) Head-to-head goal difference; 4) Head-to-head goals scored; 5) Goal difference; 6) Goals scored.
(R) Relegated

==== Results summary ====
Overall								Home						Away					
Pld	W	D	L	GF	GA	GD	Pts	W	D	L	GF	GA	GD	W	D	L	GF	GA	GD
36	9	13	14	32	41	−9	40	4	6	8	14	20	−6	5	7	6	18	21	−3

Last updated: 21 May 2016.
Source: Competitive matches

==== Results by round ====
Round	1	2	3	4	5	6	7	8	9	10	11	12	13	14	15	16	17	18	19	20	21	22	23	24	25	26	27	28	29	30	31	32	33	34	35	36
Ground	A	H	A	H	A	A	H	A	H	H	A	H	A	H	H	A	H	A	A	H	A	H	A	A	H	A	H	H	A	H	A	H	H	A	H	A
Result	D	D	W	L	L	L	D	W	W	W	W	W	D	L	L	W	D	L	D	L	L	W	D	D	L	W	L	D	D	L	L	D	L	D	D	L
Position	6	7	5	7	7	9	9	7	7	5	5	5	5	5	6	5	5	7	7	7	7	5	7	7	8	8	9	9	9	9	9	9	9	9	9	9

Source: Competitive matches
A = Away; H = Home; W = Win; D = Draw; L = Loss

==== Matches ====
Win Draw Loss

17 July 2015 1	Maribor	1 – 1	Zavrč	Maribor
20:15 CEST (UTC+02:00)	Filipović (yellow card) 35'; Zahović 39'	Report (in Slovene)	Matjašič 10'	Stadium: Ljudski vrt Attendance: 3,000; Referee: Bojan Mertik

24 July 2015 2	Zavrč	0 – 0	Olimpija	Zavrč
20:15 CEST (UTC+02:00)	Polić (yellow card) 23'; Matjašič (yellow card) 35'; Cvek (yellow card) 47'; Novoselec (yellow card) 73'	Report (in Slovene)	Kapun (yellow card) 50'	Stadium: Zavrč Sports Park; Attendance: 900; Referee: Miran Bukovec

1 August 2015 3	Rudar	1 – 3	Zavrč	Velenje
18:30 CEST (UTC+02:00)	Jahić (yellow card) 21'; Prašnikar 44'	Report (in Slovene)	Polić 3', (yellow card) 41'; Glavica 23', 86'; Antić (yellow card) 59'; Rogač (yellow card) 62'	Stadium: Ob Jezeru City Stadium; Attendance: 400; Referee: Andrej Žnidaršič

7 August 2015 4	Zavrč	0 – 1	Krka	Zavrč
18:30 CEST (UTC+02:00)	Novoselec (yellow card) 16'; Cvek (yellow card) 56'	Report (in Slovene)	Welbeck (yellow card) 68'; Ejup 76'	Stadium: Zavrč Sports Park; Attendance: 300; Referee: Mitja Žganec

11 August 2015 5	Gorica	3 – 0	Zavrč	Nova Gorica
17:30 CEST (UTC+02:00)	Kolenc (yellow card) 17'; Eleke 69', 78', (yellow card) 81'; Jogan 85'	Report	Datković (yellow card) 74'	Stadium: Nova Gorica Sports Park; Attendance: 550; Referee: Marko Podgoršek

17 August 2015 6	Celje	2 – 1	Zvarč	Celje
20:15 CEST (UTC+02:00)	Težak (yellow card) 16'; Miškić (yellow card) 35'; Klapan (yellow card) 63'; Vrhovec 64', (yellow card) 74'; Omoregie 85'	Report (in Slovene)	Glavica (yellow card) 15'; Antić (yellow card) 48'; Matjašič (yellow card) 61'; Pihler 62'	Stadium: Arena Petrol; Attendance: 1,050; Referee: Dragoslav Perić

21 August 2015 7	Zavrč	0 – 0	Domžale	Zavrč
19:00 CEST (UTC+02:00)	Glavica (yellow card) 45'; Kokorović (yellow card) 72'; Pihler (yellow card) 75'	Report (in Slovene)	Podlogar (yellow card) 59'	Stadium: Zavrč Sports Park; Attendance: 700; Referee: Miran Bukovec

29 August 2015 8	Krško	0 – 1	Zavrč	Krško
20:15 CEST (UTC+02:00)	Drnovšek (yellow card) 34'; Đukić (yellow card) 38'	Report (in Slovene)	Pihler (yellow card) 66'; Kokorović (yellow card) 69', (goal) 76'	Stadium: Matija Gubec Stadium; Attendance: 1,500; Referee: Matej Jug

11 September 2015 9	Zavrč	1 – 0	Koper	Zavrč
20:15 CEST (UTC+02:00)	Zorko 4'; Datković (yellow card) 36'; Rogač (yellow card) 67'; Batrović (yellow card) 73'; Kokorović (yellow card) 90'; Muslimović (yellow card) 90+3'	Report (in Slovene)	Tomas del Toro (yellow card) 56'; Ivančić (yellow card) 69'; Galešić (yellow card) 79'	Stadium: Zavrč Sports Park; Attendance: 350; Referee: Dragoslav Perić

19 September 2015 10	Zavrč	2 – 1	Maribor	Zavrč
19:00 CEST (UTC+02:00)	Šuler 37' (o.g.); Datković (yellow card) 49'; Bajza (yellow card) 70'; Kabha 86' (o.g.)	Report (in Slovene)	Mendy (yellow card) 22'; Stojanović (yellow card) 72'; Bohar 76'	Stadium: Zavrč Sports Park; Attendance: 2,200; Referee: Rade Obrenović

23 September 2015 11	Olimpija	0 – 2	Zavrč	Ljubljana
18:00 CEST (UTC+02:00)	Mitrović (yellow card) 67'	Report (in Slovene)	Batrović 12'; Matjašič 17', (yellow card) 45'; Zorko (yellow card) 57'; Bajza (yellow card) 70'	Stadium: Stožice Stadium; Attendance: 3,000; Referee: Damir Skomina

26 September 2015 12	Zavrč	3 – 2	Rudar	Zavrč
19:00 CEST (UTC+02:00)	Batrović (yellow card) 63'; Cvek 68'; Pihler 79', 90'; Petrović (yellow card) 90'	Report (in Slovene)	Knezović (yellow card) 43', (goal) 57'; Prašnikar (yellow card) 78'; Kašnik (yellow card) 78'; Trifkovič 84', (yellow card) 33' (yellow-red card) 89'; Kocić (yellow card) 90+2'; S.Babić (yellow card) 90+2'; M.Babić (yellow card) 90+4'	Stadium: Zavrč Sports Park; Attendance: 650; Referee: Roberto Ponis

4 October 2015 13	Krka	1 – 1	Zavrč	Novo Mesto
16:00 CEST (UTC+02:00)	Perić 34'; Marotti (yellow card) 40'	Report (in Slovene)	Batrović 51'	Stadium: Portoval; Attendance: 400; Referee: Matej Jug

16 October 2015 14	Zavrč	1 – 2	Gorica	Zavrč
19:00 CEST (UTC+02:00)	Batrović 66'	Report (in Slovene)	Burgič 11'; Eleke 32'; Džuzdanović (yellow card) 38'; Kavčič (yellow card) 64'; Škarabot (yellow card) 81'; Martinović (yellow card) 88'	Stadium: Zavrč Sports Park; Attendance: 700; Referee: Dejan Balažič

24 October 2015 15	Zavrč	0 – 1	Celje	Zavrč
17:00 CET (UTC+01:00)	Rogač (yellow card) 3'; Pihler (yellow card) 8'; Muslimović (yellow card) 54'; Petrović (yellow card) 62'; Zorko (yellow card) 85'	Report (in Slovene)	Miškić (yellow card) 11'; Klemenčič (yellow card) 28'; Pajač 32'; Krajcer (red card) 86'	Stadium: Zavrč Sports Park; Attendance: 300; Referee: Mitja Žganec

31 October 2015 16	Domžale	0 – 1	Zavrč	Domžale
15:30 CET (UTC+01:00)	Dobrovoljc (yellow card) 47' (yellow-red card) 70'	Report (in Slovene)	Cvek (yellow card) 27'; Kokorović (yellow card) 40'; Riera (yellow card) 42'; Muslimović 90+1'; Batrović (yellow card) 90+3'	Stadium: Domžale Sports Park; Attendance: 400; Referee: Bojan Mertik

6 November 2015 17	Zavrč	1 – 1	Krško	Zavrč
18:00 CET (UTC+01:00)		Report (in Slovene)		Stadium: Zavrč Sports Park; Attendance: 550; Referee: Rade Obrenović

21 November 2015 18	Koper	3 – 1	Zavrč	Koper
16:00 CET (UTC+01:00)	Vekić 4'; Pavić (yellow card) 25'; Andrejašič (yellow card) 27'; S.Dedić (yellow card) 58'; Štulac 59', 82'; Radujko (yellow card) 62'; Hadžić (yellow card) 89'	Report (in Slovene)	Riera (yellow card) 38'; Golubar 67'; Datković (yellow card) 68'; Petrović (yellow card) 88'	Stadium: Bonifika Stadium; Attendance: 300; Referee: Miran Bukovec

28 November 2015 19	Maribor	3 – 3	Zavrč	Maribor
17:30 CET (UTC+01:00)	Ibraimi 17'; Mendy 62'; Kabha 69'	Report (in Slovene)	Batrović (yellow card) 10', (goal) 55'; Glavica 36', (yellow card) 43'; Riera 54' (pen.) Cvek (yellow card) 79'; Pihler (yellow card) 89'	Stadium: Ljudski vrt Attendance: 2,500; Referee: Mitja Žganec

2 December 2015 20	Zavrč	1 – 2	Olimpija	Zavrč
CET (UTC+01:00)	Golubar 5', (yellow card) 68'; Tahiraj (yellow card) 9'; Glavina (yellow card) 18'; Kokorović (yellow card) 49'	Report (in Slovene)	Ontivero 22'; Čale (yellow card) 24'; Zajc (yellow card) 33'; Henty 64'	Stadium: Zavrč Sports Park; Attendance: 750; Referee: Slavko Vinčić

5 December 2015 21	Rudar	1 – 0	Zavrč	Velenje
15:30 CET (UTC+01:00)	Kašnik 23', (yellow card) 25'; Kocić (yellow card) 31'; Eterović (yellow card) 78'	Report (in Slovene)	Tahiraj (yellow card) 35'; Pihler (yellow card) 75'; Rogač (yellow card) 84'; Petrović (yellow card) 88'	Stadium: Ob Jezeru City Stadium; Attendance: 500; Referee: Darjan Kovačič

11 December 2015 22	Zavrč	2 – 1	Krka	Zavrč
18:00 CET (UTC+01:00)	Pihler (yellow card) 71'; Vučkić 76' (o.g.); Tahiraj 85'	Report (in Slovene)	Mojstrović 5'; Vučkić (yellow card) 26'	Stadium: Zavrč Sports Park; Attendance: 550; Referee: Damir Skomina

27 February 2016 23	Gorica	2 – 2	Zavrč	Nova Gorica
15:00 CET (UTC+01:00)	Osuji 19'; Burgić (yellow card) 35'; Jogan (yellow card) 36'; Celcer (red card) 43'; Nunič 76'	Report (in Slovene)	Batrović 22', 36' (pen.); Tahiraj (yellow card) 43'; Kokorović (yellow card) 81'	Stadium: Nova Gorica Sports Park; Attendance: 350; Referee: Vojko Goričan

5 March 2016 24	Celje	0 – 0	Zavrč	Celje
15:00 CET (UTC+01:00)	Hadžić (yellow card) 21'	Report (in Slovene)	Rogač (yellow card) 24'; Filipović (yellow card) 47'	Stadium: Arena Petrol; Attendance: 900; Referee: Rade Obrenović

12 March 2016 25	Zavrč	0 – 1	Domžale	Zavrč
19:00 CET (UTC+01:00)	Tahiraj (yellow card) 59'; Mužek (yellow card) 78'	Report (in Slovene)	Mance 15'; Jarović (yellow card) 44'; Júnior (yellow card) 79'; Dobrovoljc (yellow card) 82'	Stadium: Zavrč Sports Park; Attendance: 500; Referee: Damir Skomina

19 March 2016 26	Krško	0 – 1	Zavrč	Krško
19:00 CET (UTC+01:00)	Sikošek (yellow card) 44'; Gregov (yellow card) 72'; Petric (yellow card) 74'	Report (in Slovene)	Cvek 16'; Golubar (yellow card) 22'; Kokorović (yellow card) 33'; Ranilović (yellow card) 70'; Tuđan (yellow card) 89'	Stadium: Matija Gubec Stadium; Attendance: 1,100; Referee: Dragoslav Perić

3 April 2016 27	Zavrč	1 – 3	Koper	Zavrč
16:55 CEST (UTC+02:00)	Glavica (yellow card) 44'; Antić (yellow card) 47'; Tahiraj (yellow card) 65', (goal) 81'; Agboyi (yellow card) 70'	Report (in Slovene)	Datković 19', 26'; Belima (yellow card) 39', (goal) 59'; Pavić (yellow card) 46'; Jurina (yellow card) 57'; Batur (yellow card) 65' (yellow-red card) 76'	Stadium: Zavrč Sports Park; Attendance: 400; Referee: Matej Jug

6 April 2016 28	Zavrč	0 – 0	Maribor	Zavrč
18:00 CEST (UTC+02:00)	Shtanenko (yellow card) 42'; Rogač (yellow card) 59'; Kokorović (yellow card) 89'	Report (in Slovene)	Kabha (yellow card) 38'; Viler (yellow card) 67'	Stadium: Zavrč Sports Park; Attendance: 1,500; Referee: Bojan Mertik

10 April 2016 29	Olimpija	1 – 1	Zavrč	Ljubljana
16:55 CEST (UTC+02:00)	Matić (yellow card) 36'; Fink (yellow card) 42'; Kapun (yellow card) 65'; Eleke 90+3'	Report (in Slovene)	Agboyi (yellow card) 9'; Šeliga 68' (o.g.); Filipović (yellow card) 85'	Stadium: Stožice Stadium; Attendance: 3,000; Referee: Miran Bukovec

17 April 2016 30	Zavrč	0 – 2	Rudar	Zavrč
19:00 CEST (UTC+02:00)	Shtanenko (yellow card) 18' (yellow-red card) 90'	Report (in Slovene)	Eterović 52', (yellow card) 52'; Jahić (yellow card) 55'; Krcić 73'; Črnčič (yellow card) 76'	Stadium: Zavrč Sports Park; Attendance: 600; Referee: Alen Borošak

24 April 2016 31	Krka	2 – 0	Zavrč	Novo Mesto
15:00 CEST (UTC+02:00)	Welbeck (yellow card) 44'; Dangubić (yellow card) 64', (goal) 73'; Boccaccini 75'	Report (in Slovene)	Mužek (yellow card) 34'; Antić (yellow card) 53'; Golubar (yellow card) 62'	Stadium: Portoval; Attendance: 250; Referee: Rade Obrenović

29 April 2016 32	Zavrč	1 – 1	Gorica	Zavrč
19:00 CEST (UTC+02:00)	Golubar 31'; Jakšić (yellow card) 36'; Karamatić (yellow card) 90+3'	Report (in Slovene)	Kapić (yellow card) 29', (goal) 57'	Stadium: Zavrč Sports Park; Attendance: 300; Referee: Roberto Ponis

7 May 2016 33	Zavrč	0 – 1	Celje	Zavrč
19:00 CEST (UTC+02:00)	Jakšić (yellow card) 13'; Tahiraj (yellow card) 75'; Agboyi (yellow card) 81'	Report (in Slovene)	Hadžić 63'; Podlogar (yellow card) 89'	Stadium: Zavrč Sports Park; Attendance: 250; Referee: Bojan Mertik

11 May 2016 34	Domžale	0 – 0	Zavrč	Domžale
19:00 CEST (UTC+02:00)	Trajkovski (yellow card) 53'; Črnic (yellow card) 60'; Mance (yellow card) 74'	Report (in Slovene)	Kokorović (yellow card) 60'	Stadium: Domžale Sports Park; Attendance: 300; Referee: Asmir Sagrković

14 May 2016 35	Zavrč	1 – 1	Krško	Zavrč
16:55 CEST (UTC+02:00)	Gregov (yellow card) 30', (goal) 45'; Kramarič (yellow card) 32'	Report (in Slovene)	Golubar (yellow card) 36', (goal) 85'; Mužek (yellow card) 54'; Tahiraj (yellow card) 64'; Jakšić (yellow card) 81'; Rogač (yellow card) 83'	Stadium: Zavrč Sports Park; Attendance: 250; Referee: Slavko Vinčić

21 May 2016 36	Koper	1 – 0	Zavrč	Koper
16:55 CEST (UTC+02:00)	Datković (yellow card) 33'; Štulac 38'; Biljan (yellow card) 72'; Štromajer (yellow card) 77'; Tomić (yellow card) 82'	Report (in Slovene)	Jakšić (yellow card) 24' (yellow-red card) 37'; Antić (yellow card) 37'; Karamatić (yellow card) 45'; Agboyi (yellow card) 77'	Stadium: Bonifika Stadium; Attendance: 700; Referee: Dejan Balažič

=== PrvaLiga play-off ===
==== First leg ====
29 May 2016 1	Zavrč	3–2	Aluminij	Zavrč
20:00 CEST (UTC+02:00)	Pihler 42', (yellow card) 70'; Kokorović (yellow card) 13', (goal) 44'; Tišma (yellow card) 84', (goal) 86'	Report (in Slovene)	Bizjak 14' (pen.); Kurež 24'	Stadium: Sports Park; Attendance: 600; Referee: Roberto Ponis

==== Second leg ====
2 June 2016 2	Aluminij	1 – 1 (3 – 4 agg.)	Zavrč	Kidričevo
17:00 CEST (UTC+02:00)	Topolovec (yellow card) 18'; Bizjak 56' (pen.); Čeh (yellow card) 69'	Report (in Slovene)	Miketić (yellow card) 29'; Pihler 58'; Kokorović (yellow card) 61'; Mužek (yellow card) 65'	Stadium: Sports Park; Attendance: 1,000; Referee: Dragoslav Perić

Note: Zavrč won the play-off fixture against Aluminij Kidričevo with the score 4–3 on aggregate but the club was unsuccessful in obtaining a licence to play in the top division for the next season, due to financial reasons.

=== Cup ===
==== First round ====
Win Draw Loss

19 August 2015 1	Šampion	0 – 2	Zavrč	Celje, Slovenia
16:00 CEST (UTC+02:00)	Gračner (yellow card) 77'	Report (in Slovene)	Tuđan 37'; Matjašič 68'	Stadium: Olimp; Attendance: 80; Referee: Štefan Fekonja

==== Round of 16 ====
16 September 2015 2	Veržej	0 – 4	Zavrč	Veržej, Slovenia
16:00 CEST (UTC+02:00)	Lukač (yellow card) 20'; Srnec (yellow card) 32'; Duh (yellow card) 56'; Vinkovič (yellow card) 89'	Report (in Slovene)	Tahiraj (yellow card) 53'; Polić 56' (pen.), 87'; Mužek (yellow card) 63'; Novoselec (yellow card) 70'; Pihler 75'; Muslimović (yellow card) 76'; Glavica 88'	Stadium: Čistina Stadium; Attendance: 200; Referee: Alen Borošak

==== Quarter-finals ====
21 October 2015 First leg	Zavrč	1 – 1	Drava Ptuj	Zavrč, Slovenia
18:00 CEST (UTC+02:00)	Kokorović (yellow card) 5'; Batrović 37' (yellow card) 40'; Muslimović (yellow card) 44'	Report (in Slovene)	Ajlec (yellow card) 38'; Čeh (yellow card) 48'; Šalamun 57', (yellow card) 80'; Tisaj (yellow card) 69'	Stadium: Zavrč Sports Park; Attendance: 600; Referee: Darjan Kovačič

28 October 2015 Second leg	Drava Ptuj	0 – 3 (1 – 4 agg.)	Zavrč	Ptuj, Slovenia
14:00 CET (UTC+01:00)	Krajnc (yellow card) 44'; Čeh (yellow card) 77'	Report (in Slovene)	Datković (yellow card) 17'; Pihler (yellow card) 25' (yellow-red card); Batrović 41' 77'; Tahiraj (yellow card) 64'; Riera 68'	Stadium: Ptuj City Stadium; Attendance: 600; Referee: Slavko Vinčić

==== Semi-finals ====
14 April 2016 First leg	Zavrč	2 – 1	Maribor	Zavrč
18:00 CET (UTC+01:00)	Golubar 11'; Pihler (yellow card) 23'; Kokorović (yellow card) 32'; Matjašič 43'	Report (in Slovene)	Bajde (yellow card) 57', (goal) 71'; Tavares (yellow card) 90+2'	Stadium: Sports Park; Attendance: 1,800; Referee: Dejan Balažič

20 April 2016 Second leg	Maribor	5 – 1 (a.e.t.) (6 – 3 agg.)	Zavrč	Maribor
18:00 CET (UTC+01:00)	Mendy 30', (yellow card) 90'; Novaković (yellow card) 34', (goal) 102', 105'; Defendi (yellow card) 58'; Sallalich 72', 91'; Viler (yellow card) 76'	Report (in Slovene)	Golubar (yellow card) 23'; Handanović 43' (o.g.); Mužek (yellow card) 45'; Jakšić (yellow card) 49'; Miketić (yellow card) 53', (red card) 75'; Matjašič (yellow card) 75'	Stadium: Ljudski vrt Attendance: 3,000; Referee: Nejc Kajtazović

== See also ==
- 2015–16 Slovenian PrvaLiga
- 2015–16 Slovenian Football Cup
