= Urbanc =

Urbanc is a surname. Notable people with the surname include:

- Dejan Urbanč (born 1984), Slovenian footballer
- Rok Urbanc (born 1985), Slovenian ski jumper
