= Stefan Petrović =

Stefan Petrović may refer to:

- Stefan Petrović (footballer, born 1990), Serbian footballer
- Stefan Petrović (footballer, born 1993), Austrian footballer
