= Serdar Gözübüyük =

Dutch football referee

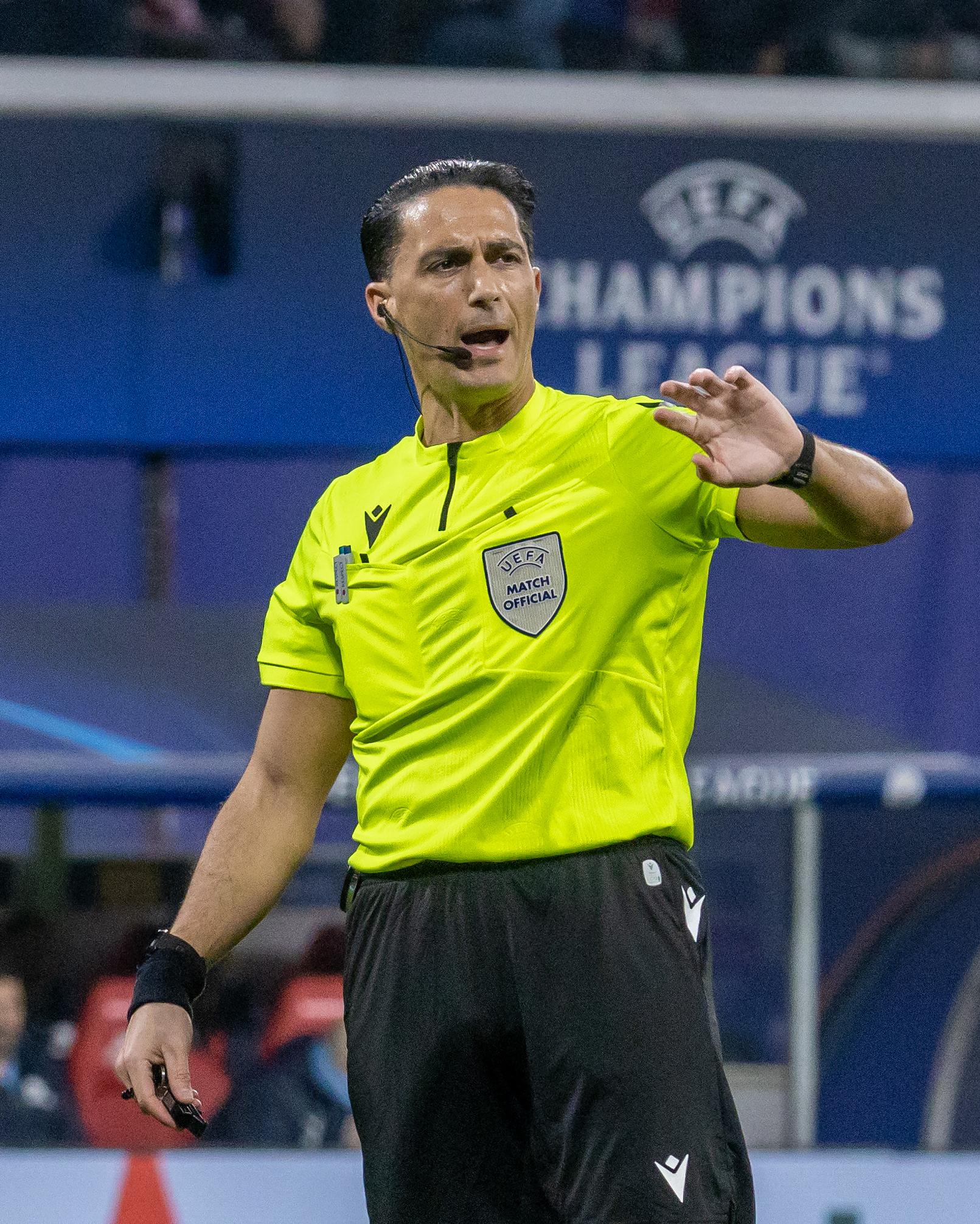
- Gözübüyük refereeing in 2023
- Full name: Serdar Gözübüyük
- Born: 29 October 1985 (age 40); Haarlem, Netherlands

Domestic
Years	League	Role
2010–	Eredivisie	Referee

International
Years	League	Role
2012–	FIFA listed	Referee

Serdar Gözübüyük (born 29 October 1985) is a Dutch football referee. He has officiated in 2014 FIFA World Cup qualifiers, beginning with the match between Malta and Italy on 26 March 2013.

He is a FIFA referee, and since 2022, is ranked as a UEFA elite category referee.

== Personal life ==
Gözübüyük is of Turkish origin.
