= José María Sánchez Martínez =

Spanish football referee

- Born: 3 October 1983 (age 43); Lorca, Spain
- Other occupation: Economist

Domestic
| Years | League | Role |
| 2005–2010 | Tercera División | Referee |
| 2010–2011 | Segunda División B | Referee |
| 2011–2015 | Segunda División | Referee |
| 2015– | La Liga | Referee |

International
| Years | League | Role |
| 2017– | FIFA listed | Referee |

José María Sánchez Martínez (born 3 October 1983) is a Spanish football referee who officiates in La Liga. He is a FIFA referee, and is ranked as a UEFA elite category referee.

== Refereeing career ==
Sánchez began officiating in 2000. He refereed in the La Liga Segunda División B for the 2010–11 season, before moving up to Segunda División in the following season. After four years, he was promoted to officiate in La Liga, the top division in Spain. He officiated his first match on 29 August 2015, a 0–0 draw between Real Sociedad and Sporting Gijón. In 2017, he officiated the second leg of the 2017 Supercopa de España between Real Madrid and Barcelona, which finished as a 2–0 win for Madrid.

In 2017, Sánchez became a FIFA listed referee. He officiated his first European club match on 13 July 2017, a Europa League second qualifying round match between Trenčín and Bnei Yehuda. On 22 March 2019, he officiated his first senior international match, a friendly between Argentina and Venezuela.

On 2 May 2019, Sánchez was selected as one of the video assistant referee officials for the 2019 FIFA Women's World Cup in France.

On 15 April 2025, Sánchez officiated a UEFA Champions League quarter-final match between Aston Villa and Paris Saint Germain.

== Personal life ==
Sánchez was born in Lorca, Murcia. He is an economist and works as a bank employee.

== See also ==
- List of football referees
