= Alejandro Hernández Hernández =

Spanish football referee

Alejandro Hernández
- Full name: Alejandro José Hernández Hernández
- Born: 10 November 1982 (age 44); Arrecife, Spain

Domestic
Years	League	Role
2012–	La Liga	Referee

International
Years	League	Role
2014–	FIFA listed	Referee

Alejandro José Hernández Hernández (born 10 November 1982) is a Spanish football referee.

He has been a full international referee for FIFA since 2014. He is widely regarded as one of Spain's greatest referees in contemporary football, having been voted as the best by the Spanish FA's technical committee in 2017. He is presently ranked as a UEFA elite category referee.
