= Ovbokha Agboyi =

Nigerian footballer (born 1994)

Personal information
- Full name: Ovbokha Agboyi
- Date of birth: 14 December 1994 (age 31)
- Place of birth: Abuja, Nigeria
- Height: 1.77 m (5 ft 10 in)
- Position: Defensive midfielder

Senior career*
Years	Team	Apps	(Gls)
2012–2013	Abuja F.C.		
2013–2014	Bayelsa United		
2014	Enugu Rangers		
2014–2015	Skënderbeu	0	(0)
2014–2015	→ Elbasani (loan)	24	(2)
2015–2016	Zavrč	11	(0)
2017–2021	Bravo	116	(13)

International career
2013	Nigeria U20	8	(0)
- * Club domestic league appearances and goals as of 1 September 2021

Ovbokha Agboyi (born 14 December 1994) is a Nigerian footballer who plays as a midfielder. He was a member of Nigeria U20 at the 2013 FIFA U-20 World Cup, where he played in all four games.
