= Tin Martić =

Croatian footballer

Personal information
- Full name: Tin Martić
- Date of birth: 27 March 1996 (age 30)
- Place of birth: Zagreb, Croatia
- Height: 1.86 m (6 ft 1 in)
- Position: Centre-back

Youth career
- Rudeš
- 2014: Krško Posavje

Senior career*
Years	Team	Apps	(Gls)
2015–2016	Krško Posavje	23	(0)
2016	Samobor	10	(0)
2016–2017	Brežice 1919	19	(0)
2017–2018	Krka	28	(0)
2018–2019	Drava Ptuj	24	(1)
2019–2021	Brežice 1919	34	(6)
2021–2024	Aluminij	83	(9)
2024–2025	Semen Padang	30	(3)
- * Club domestic league appearances and goals as of 24 May 2025

Tin Martić (born 27 March 1996) is a Croatian professional footballer who plays as a centre-back.

== Club career ==
Born in Zagreb, Croatia, at a young age, he began his career abroad by joining Slovenian club Rudeš and Krško Posavje. And in 2016, he decided to return to his homeland and joined Samobor.

Then, he returned to Slovenia and played for a number of clubs in the second tier of the Slovenian league, namely Brežice 1919, Krka, Drava Ptuj, back to Brezice 1919 and Aluminij.

=== NK Aluminij ===
He was signed for NK Aluminij and played in Slovenian Second League in 2021–22 season. Martić made his league debut on 17 July 2021 as a substitute in a 0–0 draw over FC Koper. He scored his first league goal for the club on 22 May 2022 in a 2–2 draw against NK Tabor Sežana at Aluminij Sports Park. Martić finished the season with only one goal in 25 games.

In the following season, on 7 October 2022, he scored his first goal of the 2022–23 season, in a 4–1 win against NK Dekani.

=== Semen Padang ===
On 9 July 2024, Martić decided to Asia and signed a one-year contract with Liga 1 club Semen Padang.
