= Sachem Wilson =

American soccer player

Personal information
- Full name: Theodore Develan Wilson III
- Date of birth: 24 October 1994 (age 32)
- Place of birth: United States
- Position: Striker

Senior career*
Years	Team	Apps	(Gls)
- Torch FC
2015-2017	ND Adria Miren	37	(33)
2016	ND Gorica	2	(0)
2017-2018	NK Krka	21	(8)
2019–2020	Carrick Rangers	3	(1)
2020-	Knattspyrnufélag Fjallabyggðar	7	(4)
- * Club domestic league appearances and goals

Sachem Wilson (born 24 October 1994 in the United States) is an American soccer player.
