= Rade Obrenović =

Slovenian football referee

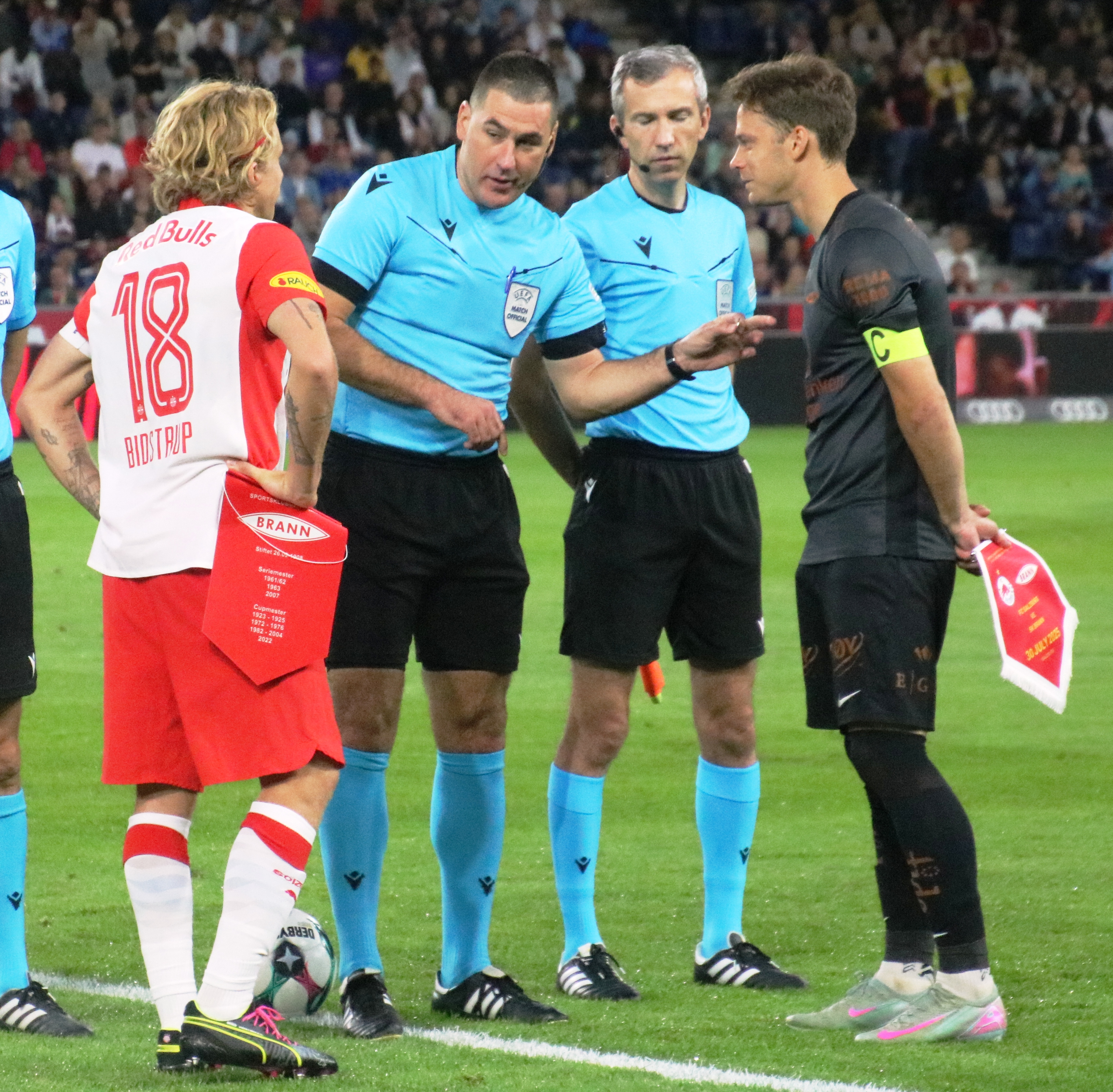
- Obrenović in 2025 (in the middle)
- Born: 28 August 1990 (age 36); Ljubljana, Slovenia

Rade Obrenović (born 28 August 1990) is a Slovenian football referee who officiates in the Slovenian PrvaLiga and in international competitions under the auspices of UEFA and FIFA. He has been on the FIFA International Referees List since 2017. Since January 2026, he is a UEFA elite category referee.

== Refereeing career ==
Obrenović began his senior refereeing career in the Slovenian second division (Druga Liga) on 5 April 2013. He was first listed as a FIFA referee in 2017, which made him eligible to officiate international matches and UEFA club competition fixtures. Two months after joining the international list, he refereed his first UEFA match in March 2017 in qualifying for the UEFA European Under-17 Championship.

Since then, he has taken charge of fixtures in continental club tournaments including the UEFA Europa Conference League, UEFA Europa League and UEFA Champions League. He has also officiated UEFA Nations League matches; for example, he was appointed referee for the Denmark vs Spain match in the 2024–25 Nations League season.

In April 2024, Obrenović was selected as part of the officiating teams for UEFA Euro 2024 in Germany, serving as a fourth official or assistant referee on the reserve list.

On 12 December 2025, the UEFA Referees Committee announced Obrenović’s promotion from First Category to the elite category of UEFA referees, effective from 1 January 2026.
