= Stanislav Shtanenko =

Ukrainian football player

Personal information
- Full name: Stanislav Nikolaevich Shtanenko
- Date of birth: 5 February 1996 (age 30)
- Place of birth: Ukraine
- Height: 1.76 m (5 ft 9 in)
- Position: Defender

Youth career
- –2012: UFK Lviv
- 2012–2014: Karpaty Lviv

Senior career*
Years	Team	Apps	(Gls)
2014–2016	Karpaty Lviv	0	(0)
2016	NK Zavrč	4	(0)
2016	Zirka Kropyvnytskyi	0	(0)
2017–2018	Unia Turza Śląska	7	(0)
2018	Skala Stryi	6	(0)
2018–2019	Podillya Khmelnytskyi	7	(0)
2019	Sluch	6	(3)
2019–2020	Niva	9	(0)
2020	Unia Turza Śląska		

International career
2013	Ukraine U17	7	(0)
- * Club domestic league appearances and goals

Stanislav Shtanenko (born 5 February 1996) is a Ukrainian former professional footballer who played as a defender.

== Career ==
Shtanenko started his senior career with Karpaty Lviv. In 2016, he signed for NK Zavrč in the Slovenian PrvaLiga, where he made four appearances and scored zero goals. After that, he played for Zirka Kropyvnytskyi, Unia Turza Śląska, Skala Stryi, Podillya Khmelnytskyi, Sluch, and Niva, before retiring after a short second spell with Unia.
