= Matic Reja =

Slovenian footballer (born 1995)

Personal information
- Date of birth: 21 September 1995 (age 31)
- Place of birth: Izola, Slovenia
- Position: Left-back

Youth career
- –2009: Izola
- 2009–2013: Koper

Senior career*
Years	Team	Apps	(Gls)
2013–2016	Koper	7	(0)
2014	→ Jadran Dekani (loan)	12	(2)
2015–2016	→ Ankaran Hrvatini (loan)	35	(6)
2016	Jadran Dekani	14	(4)
2017–2018	SV Dellach/Gail	35	(5)

International career
2012–2013	Slovenia U18	13	(0)
2013	Slovenia U19	3	(0)
- * Club domestic league appearances and goals as of 30 June 2018

Matic Reja (born 21 September 1995) is a Slovenian footballer who played for Jadran Dekani.
