= Davor Rogač =

Croatian footballer (born 1988)

Personal information
- Full name: Davor Rogač
- Date of birth: 15 May 1990 (age 36)
- Place of birth: Supetar, SFR Yugoslavia
- Height: 1.89 m (6 ft 2 in)
- Position: Centre back

Team information
- Current team: SK Fürstenfeld
- Number: 6

Youth career
- Jadran Supetar
- 2000–2005: Hrvatski Dragovoljac
- 2005–2009: Dinamo Zagreb

Senior career*
Years	Team	Apps	(Gls)
2009–2013	Lučko	79	(0)
2013–2014	Inter Zaprešić	29	(4)
2014–2015	Lučko	27	(0)
2015–2016	Zavrč	30	(0)
2016–2017	THOI Lakatamia	21	(1)
2017–2019	Ethnikos Achna	48	(3)
2019–2020	Lučko		
2020	TUS Bad Waltersdorf	0	(0)
2020–2021	Bratstvo Kunovec		
2021–	SK Fürstenfeld	39	(2)

International career
2006	Croatia U16	5	(0)
2006	Croatia U17	6	(1)
- * Club domestic league appearances and goals as of 9 December 2022

Davor Rogač (born 29 March 1988) is a Croatian professional footballer who plays as a centre back for SK Fürstenfeld in Austria.

== Club career ==
Originally from Supetar on the island of Brač, Rogač started training football at the local Jadran Supetar before moving to Zagreb with his parents, initially joining NK Hrvatski Dragovoljac and subsequently moving through the ranks of GNK Dinamo Zagreb, becoming a youth international in the process.

Not signing a professional contract with the club, he played four seasons with NK Lučko, achieving promotion to Prva HNL in 2011, followed by an immediate relegation after. In 2013 he moved on to NK Inter Zaprešić, also playing in Druga HNL, but returned to Lučko for the subsequent season. In 2015, he moved abroad, to Zavrč in Slovenia, staying a season playing at the club in the local top tier, before it was relegated.

After a season-long hiatus, Rogač joined Ethnikos Achna FC on Cyprus for the 2017–2018 season. On 7 August 2019, Rogač returned to NK Lučko. In February 2020, Rogač joined Austrian club TUS Bad Waltersdorf. However, due to the cancellation of all football in Austria because of the COVID-19 pandemic, he only played a few unofficial games for the club, before returning to Croatia in August 2020, where he joined NK Bratstvo Kunovec. He left the club in July 2021 and then joined SK Fürstenfeld.

== International career ==
Rogač represented Croatia on U–16 and U–17 levels in 2006.
