= Marko Jakolić =

Slovenian footballer

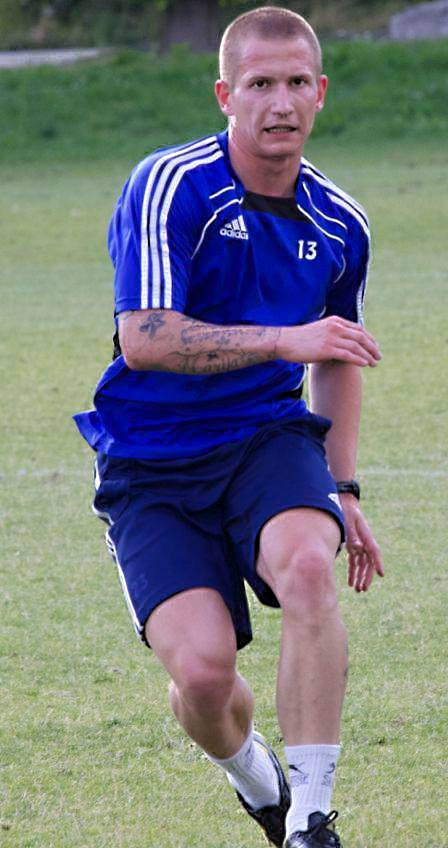

Personal information
- Full name: Marko Jakolić
- Date of birth: 16 April 1991 (age 35)
- Place of birth: Brežice, SFR Yugoslavia
- Height: 1.74 m (5 ft 9 in)
- Position: Right-back

Team information
- Current team: FC Varen-Leukerbad
- Number: 13

Youth career
- 1998–2008: Brežice
- 2009–2010: Krka

Senior career*
Years	Team	Apps	(Gls)
2009–2010	Krka	7	(0)
2010–2011	Krško	20	(1)
2011–2012	Ivančna Gorica		
2012–2013	Krško	22	(4)
2013	FC Grenchen	2	(0)
2013–2014	Krško	21	(3)
2014–2015	Celje	25	(0)
2015–2016	Krško	22	(0)
2016	Brežice 1919	13	(1)
2017	Montana	9	(0)
2017–2018	Krško	24	(0)
2018	Brežice 1919	4	(1)
2019	Krka	12	(1)
2019–2020	Krško		
2022–2023	FC Visp		
202?–	FC Varen-Leukerbad		
- * Club domestic league appearances and goals as of 2 September 2019

Marko Jakolić (born 16 April 1991) is a Slovenian football defender who plays for FC Varen-Leukerbad

== Career ==
On 23 December 2016, Jakolić signed a one-year contract with Bulgarian First League club Montana. He left in June 2017 due to a relegation clause in his contract.

Jakolić joined Swiss side FC Visp from in February 2022.
