= David Poljanec =

Slovenian footballer

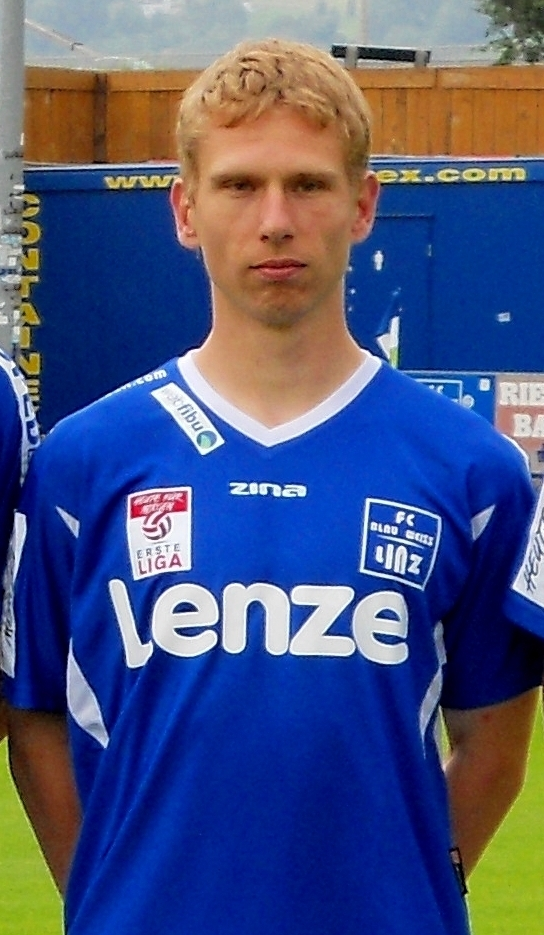

Personal information
- Full name: David Poljanec
- Date of birth: 27 November 1986 (age 39)
- Place of birth: Maribor, SFR Yugoslavia
- Height: 1.81 m (5 ft 11 1/2 in)
- Position: Striker

Team information
- Current team: WSC Hertha Wels
- Number: 10

Youth career
- Bistrica

Senior career*
Years	Team	Apps	(Gls)
2004–2006	Bistrica		
2006–2007	FC St.Nikolai/Sausal		
2007–2011	SV Gleinstätten	89	(56)
2011–2012	Blau-Weiß Linz	27	(19)
2012	SC Paderborn 07	1	(0)
2013	Blau-Weiß Linz	14	(1)
2013	Austria Klagenfurt	16	(7)
2014	Maccabi Ahi Nazareth	15	(4)
2014	Radnički Kragujevac	7	(0)
2015	Kapfenberger SV	11	(1)
2015–2016	Krško	31	(4)
2016–2017	Karmiotissa	32	(8)
2017	Aris Limassol	2	(0)
2017–2018	Nea Salamina	26	(2)
2018–2019	Stadl-Paura	29	(11)
2019–2020	WSC Hertha Wels	14	(6)
2020–2022	SV Gmundner Milch	26	(11)
2022–	FC St.Nikolai/Sausal	29	(20)
- * Club domestic league appearances and goals as of 2 January 2024

David Poljanec (born 27 November 1986) is a Slovenian football forward. He plays in Austria for WSC Hertha Wels in the Austrian Regionalliga Central.

== Career ==
He played for Bistrica, FC St. Nikolai im Sausal, SV Gleinstätten, FC Blau-Weiß Linz and SK Austria Klagenfurt in Austria, SC Paderborn 07 in the German 2. Bundesliga, and Israeli side Maccabi Ahi Nazareth in the Liga Leumit. After playing with FK Radnički 1923 in the first half of the 2014–15 Serbian SuperLiga, during the winter break he returned to Austria and signed with Kapfenberger SV playing in the Austrian Football First League.
