= Stefan Petrović (footballer, born 1993) =

Austrian footballer

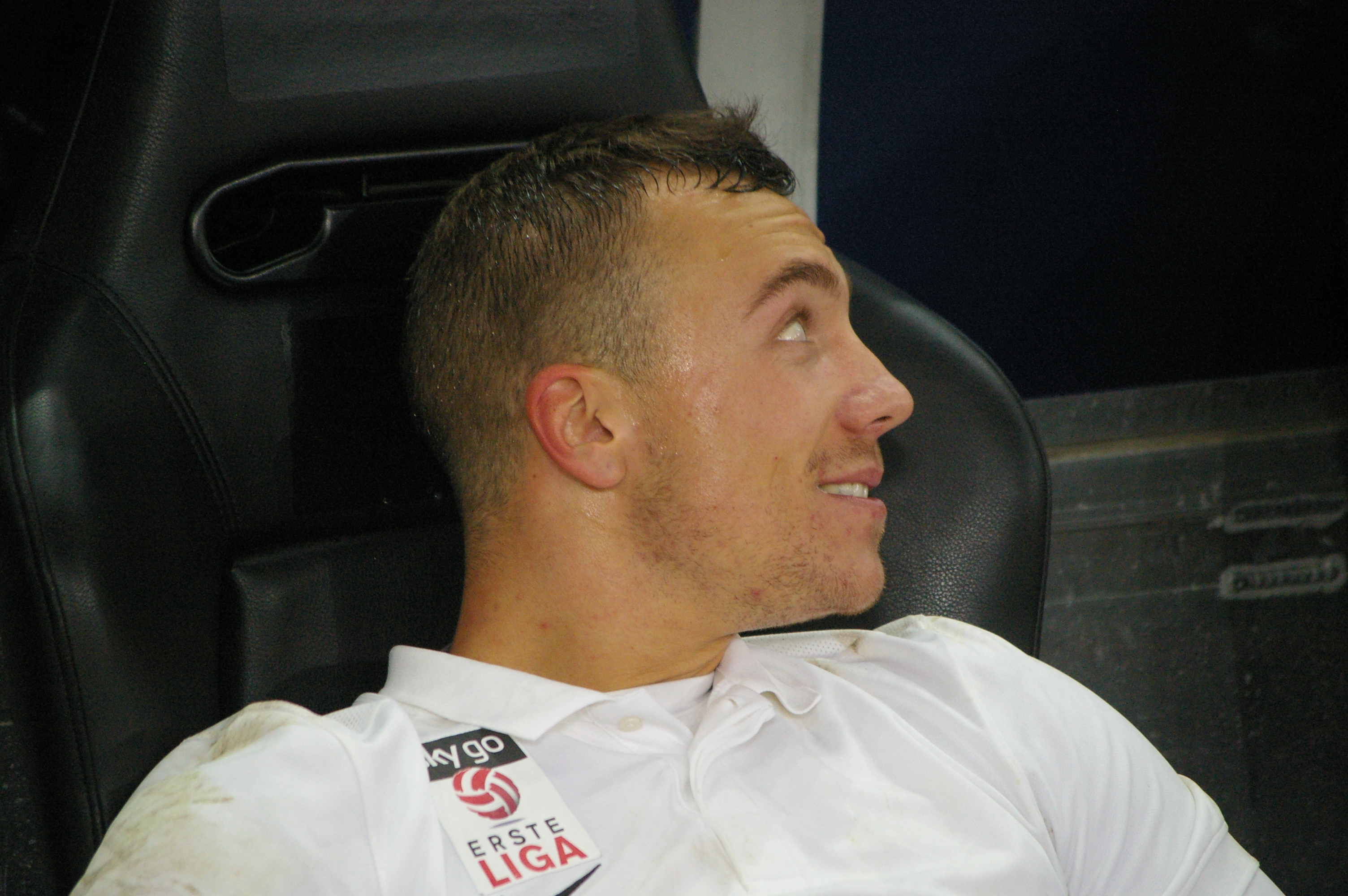

Personal information
- Date of birth: 8 September 1993 (age 33)
- Place of birth: Austria
- Height: 1.75 m (5 ft 9 in)
- Position: Midfielder

Team information
- Current team: SV Gablitz
- Number: 11

Youth career
- 2000–2002: KSV Ankerbrot
- 2002–2004: 1. Simmeringer SC
- 2004–2009: Rapid Wien
- 2009–2012: Hertha BSC

Senior career*
Years	Team	Apps	(Gls)
2012–2013	Hertha BSC II	14	(0)
2013–2013	Wiener Neustädter	0	(0)
2013	→ FC Pasching (loan)	4	(0)
2013–2014	FC Pasching	12	(1)
2014–2015	FC Liefering	5	(0)
2015–2016	Zavrč	10	(0)
2016–2018	ASK Ebreichsdorf	34	(2)
2019–2020	ASV Spratzern	27	(5)
2021–	SV Gablitz	24	(2)

International career
2008	Austria U-16	2	(0)
2009–2010	Austria U-17	5	(0)
2010	Austria U-18	1	(0)
2011–2012	Austria U-19	10	(0)
- * Club domestic league appearances and goals as of 19:56, 12 March 2023 (UTC)

Stefan Petrović (born 8 September 1993) is an Austrian footballer who plays for SV Gablitz. He was part of the FC Pasching squad that won the 2012–13 Austrian Cup.

== Honours ==
Pasching

- Austrian Cup: 2012–13
