= Veljko Batrović =

Montenegrin footballer

Personal information
- Full name: Veljko Batrović
- Date of birth: 5 March 1994 (age 32)
- Place of birth: Podgorica, FR Yugoslavia
- Height: 1.77 m (5 ft 9 1/2 in)
- Position: Attacking midfielder

Youth career
- 2008–2010: Bubamara
- 2010: Partizan
- 2011: Mogren

Senior career*
Years	Team	Apps	(Gls)
2010–2011	Zeta	1	(0)
2012–2015	Widzew Łódź	58	(4)
2015–2016	Zavrč	25	(6)
2016–2017	Domžale	10	(0)
2017	Krško	4	(0)
2018–2019	Etar Veliko Tarnovo	46	(11)
2019–2020	Radnički Niš	7	(1)
2020	Septemvri Sofia	1	(0)
2020–2021	Panachaiki	26	(8)
2021	Olympiacos Volos	7	(1)
2022	Asteras Vlachioti	12	(2)
2022–2023	Iraklis Larissa	8	(0)
2023	Anagennisi Karditsa	14	(1)
2023–2024	Budućnost	5	(2)
2024	Sutjeska Nikšić	16	(2)
2024–2025	Mornar	25	(2)

International career
2013–2016	Montenegro U21	2	(0)
- * Club domestic league appearances and goals as of 1 June 2025

Veljko Batrović (Serbian Cyrillic: Вељко Батровић, born 5 March 1994) is a Montenegrin professional footballer who most recently played as an attacking midfielder for Montenegrin First League club Mornar.

== Club career ==
Born in Podgorica, son of a former Partizan player Zoran Batrović, he went through many youth football systems including local FK Bubamara Revita, FK Partizan and FK Mogren before making his professional debut with FK Zeta in the 2010–11 Montenegrin First League.

=== Widzew Łódź ===
On January 28, 2012, he signed a three-and-a-half-year contract with Widzew Łódź in Poland. On 8 April 2013, he scored his first goal of his professional career against Polonia Warsaw.

=== Etar ===
On 17 January 2018, Batrović joined the Bulgarian First League team Etar Veliko Tarnovo.

=== Septemvri Sofia ===
Batrović signed a one-and-a-half-year contract with Bulgarian Second League team Septemvri Sofia in February 2020.

== International career ==
Batrović made his debut for Montenegro U21 on 10 September 2013, in a 3–2 win against Romania.
