= Tim Čeh =

Slovenian footballer

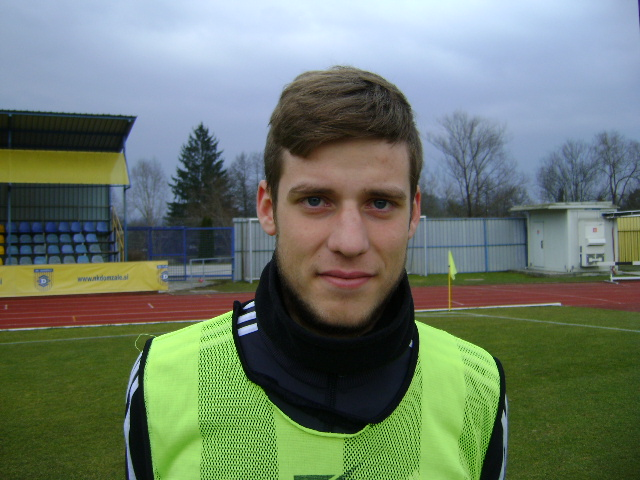
- Čeh in 2015

Personal information
- Date of birth: 13 March 1994 (age 32)
- Place of birth: Ljubljana, Slovenia
- Position: Winger

Team information
- Current team: SC Launsdorf
- Number: 20

Youth career
- Grazer AK
- –2013: Olimpija Ljubljana

Senior career*
Years	Team	Apps	(Gls)
2013–2015	Olimpija Ljubljana	6	(0)
2013	→ Bela Krajina (loan)	10	(0)
2014–2015	→ Krško (loan)	17	(3)
2015–2017	Krško	47	(2)
2017	Krka	7	(1)
2017–2018	Dob	23	(1)
2018–2019	St. Peter/Au	4	(0)
2019	TuS Greinbach	13	(2)
2019–2020	SV Dobl	12	(0)
2020–2021	Annabichler SV	8	(2)
2021–	SC Launsdorf	21	(4)

International career
2009	Slovenia U16		
2010	Slovenia U17		
2011–2012	Slovenia U18		
- * Club domestic league appearances and goals as of 20 March 2023

Tim Čeh (born 13 March 1994) is a Slovenian footballer who plays as a winger for Austrian club SC Launsdorf. He is a son of former Slovenian national player and captain Aleš Čeh.

== Honours ==
Krško

- Slovenian Second League: 2014–15
