= Dejan Urbanč =

Slovenian footballer

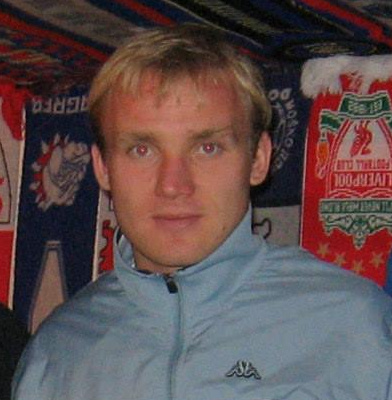

Personal information
- Full name: Dejan Urbanč
- Date of birth: 13 April 1984 (age 42)
- Place of birth: Brežice, SFR Yugoslavia
- Height: 1.78 m (5 ft 10 in)
- Position: Midfielder

Youth career
- 1992–1999: Krško
- 1999–2002: Celje

Senior career*
Years	Team	Apps	(Gls)
2002–2010	Celje	128	(3)
2003–2004	→ Krško (loan)	47	(3)
2005	→ Olimpija (loan)	14	(0)
2010–2017	Krško	133	(23)
2018	Brežice 1919	28	(1)
Total		350	(30)

International career
2000–2001	Slovenia U16	12	(1)
2001	Slovenia U17	11	(1)
2004–2005	Slovenia U20	7	(1)
2004–2006	Slovenia U21	15	(0)
- * Club domestic league appearances and goals

Dejan Urbanč (born 13 April 1984) is a retired Slovenian footballer who played as a midfielder.
