= Marko Perković (footballer) =

Croatian footballer

Personal information
- Date of birth: 30 August 1991 (age 35)
- Place of birth: Slavonski Brod, Croatia
- Height: 1.89 m (6 ft 2 in)
- Position: Defender

Team information
- Current team: NK Zagreb

Youth career
- 2010–2011: Slavonski Brod
- 2011–2012: Marsonia

Senior career*
| Years | Team | Apps | (Gls) |
| 2012–2013 | Torhout | 23 | (1) |
| 2013–2014 | Cibalia | 36 | (3) |
| 2014–2015 | Radomlje | 13 | (0) |
| 2015–2016 | Krško | 13 | (0) |
| 2016–2017 | Vikingur Reykjavik | 8 | (0) |
| 2017–2018 | RNK Split | 9 | (0) |
| 2018–2019 | Široki Brijeg | 18 | (0) |
| 2019–2020 | Brežice 1919 | 7 | (2) |
| 2020–2021 | Olimpija Ljubljana | 13 | (0) |
| 2021–2022 | MTK Budapest | 20 | (0) |
| 2022 | → MTK Budapest II | 7 | (0) |
| 2024 | Rohrbach/Lafn. | 10 | (3) |
| 2024– | NK Zagreb | | |
- * Club domestic league appearances and goals as of 8 November 2024

Marko Perković (born 30 August 1991) is a Croatian footballer who plays for Croatian side NK Zagreb as a defender.

== Career statistics ==
=== Club ===
As of 24 October 2021

Appearances and goals by club, season and competition
| Club | Season | League | | National cup | | Continental | | Total | |
| Club | Season | Apps | Goals | Apps | Goals | Apps | Goals | Apps | Goals |
|---|---|---|---|---|---|---|---|---|---|
Torhout
| Torhout | 2012–13 | 23 | 1 | 0 | 0 | — | — | 23 | 1 |
Cibalia
| Cibalia | 2013–14 | 22 | 1 | 1 | 0 | — | — | 23 | 1 |
| Cibalia | 2014–15 | 14 | 2 | 1 | 1 | — | — | 15 | 3 |
| Cibalia | Total | 36 | 3 | 2 | 1 | 0 | 0 | 38 | 4 |
Radomlje
| Radomlje | 2014–15 | 13 | 0 | 0 | 0 | — | — | 13 | 0 |
Krško
| Krško | 2014–15 | 13 | 0 | 0 | 0 | — | — | 13 | 0 |
Vikingur Reykjavik
| Vikingur Reykjavik | 2016 | 8 | 0 | 0 | 0 | — | — | 8 | 0 |
RNK Split
| RNK Split | 2016–17 | 9 | 0 | 0 | 0 | — | — | 9 | 0 |
Široki Brijeg
| Široki Brijeg | 2017–18 | 6 | 0 | 0 | 0 | — | — | 6 | 0 |
| Široki Brijeg | 2018–19 | 12 | 0 | 0 | 0 | 0 | 0 | 12 | 0 |
| Široki Brijeg | Total | 18 | 0 | 0 | 0 | 0 | 0 | 18 | 0 |
Brežice 1919
| Brežice 1919 | 2019–20 | 7 | 2 | 0 | 0 | — | — | 7 | 2 |
Olimpija Ljubljana
| Olimpija Ljubljana | 2020–21 | 13 | 0 | 1 | 0 | 0 | 0 | 14 | 0 |
MTK Budapest
| MTK Budapest | 2020–21 | 13 | 0 | 3 | 0 | — | — | 16 | 0 |
| MTK Budapest | 2021–22 | 5 | 0 | 1 | 0 | — | — | 6 | 0 |
| MTK Budapest | Total | 18 | 0 | 4 | 0 | 0 | 0 | 22 | 0 |
| Career total | | 158 | 6 | 7 | 1 | 0 | 0 | 165 | 7 |
