= Ed Kokorović =

German footballer

Personal information
- Full name: Kevin Ed Kokorović
- Date of birth: 4 January 1995 (age 31)
- Place of birth: Ludwigsburg, Germany
- Height: 1.87 m (6 ft 1 1/2 in)
- Position: Midfielder

Team information
- Current team: Cres

Youth career
- –2009: Klana
- 2009–2015: Rijeka

Senior career*
Years	Team	Apps	(Gls)
2014–2015	Rijeka	0	(0)
2014	→ Pomorac (loan)	8	(0)
2014–2015	→ Rijeka II	19	(3)
2015–2016	Zavrč	26	(1)
2016–2017	Koper	24	(1)
2017–2018	Istra 1961	13	(0)
2018	Académico Viseu	5	(0)
2019	Znojmo	0	(0)
2019	Lafnitz	1	(0)
2019	Lynx	12	(2)
2020	Slavoj Vyšehrad	12	(2)
2020–2021	Orijent 1919	14	(0)
2021-	Cres		
- * Club domestic league appearances and goals as of 24 September 2022 (UTC)

Ed Kevin Kokorović (born 4 January 1995) is a German-born, Croatian footballer who plays as a midfielder for Cres.

== Club career ==
On mid January 2019, Kokorović joined 1. SC Znojmo in the Czech National Football League. But about one month later, he regret, and instead joined SV Lafnitz in Austria. In August 2019 he joined Lynx, making his debut on 12 August against Mons Calpe.

== Career statistics ==
=== Club ===
As of 9 January 2019.

Club	Season	League			Cup		Continental		Other		Total	
Club	Season	Division	Apps	Goals	Apps	Goals	Apps	Goals	Apps	Goals	Apps	Goals
Rijeka	2013–14	Prva HNL	0	0	0	0	0	0	0	0	0	0
Rijeka	2014–15	Prva HNL	0	0	0	0	0	0	0	0	0	0
Rijeka	Total		0	0	0	0	0	0	0	0	0	0
Pomorac (loan)	2013–14	2. HNL	8	0	0	0	–		0	0	8	0
Zavrč	2015–16	Slovenian PrvaLiga	26	1	4 (Note: Appearances in the Slovenian Cup)	0	–		2 (Note: Appearances in the PrvaLiga play-off)	1	32	2
Koper	2016–17	Slovenian PrvaLiga	24	1	0	0	–		0	0	24	1
Istra 1961	2017–18	Prva HNL	13	0	1 (Note: Appearances in the Croatian Cup)	0	–		0	0	14	0
Académico Viseu	2018–19	LigaPro	5	0	0	0	–		0	0	5	0
Career total			76	2	5	0	0	0	2	1	83	3
