= UEFA elite referee category =

Highest classification for UEFA football referees

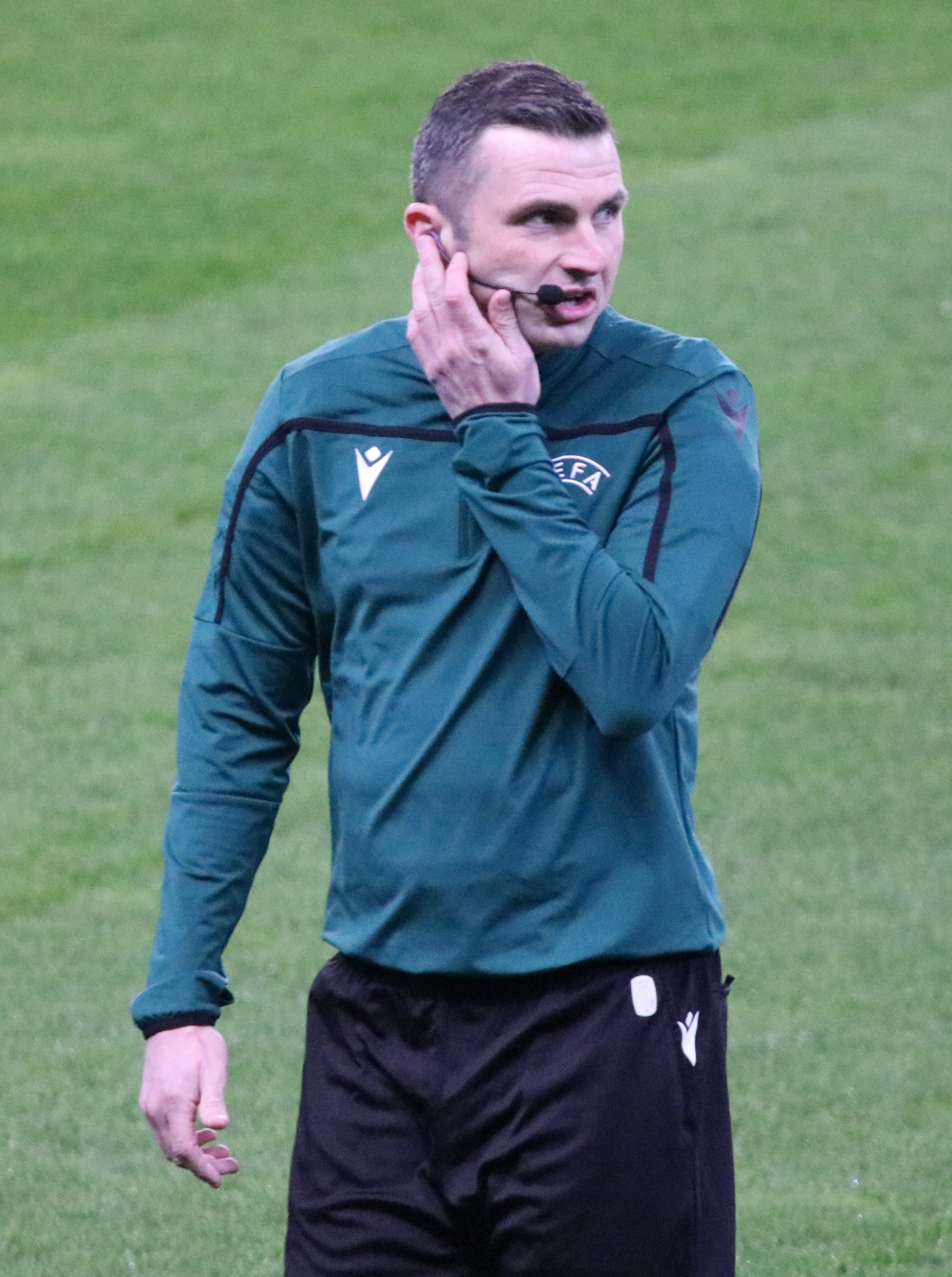
Michael Oliver

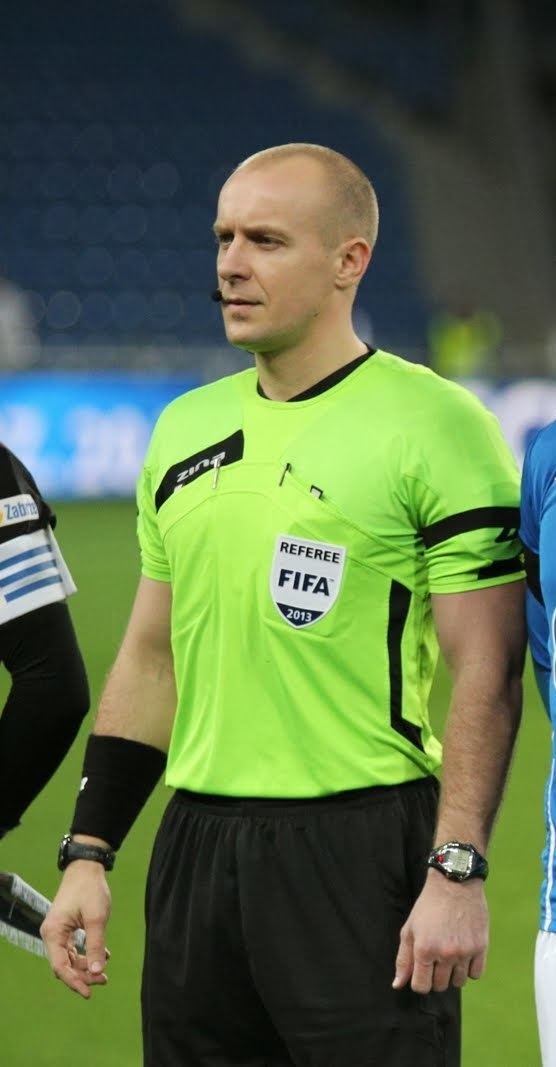
Szymon Marciniak

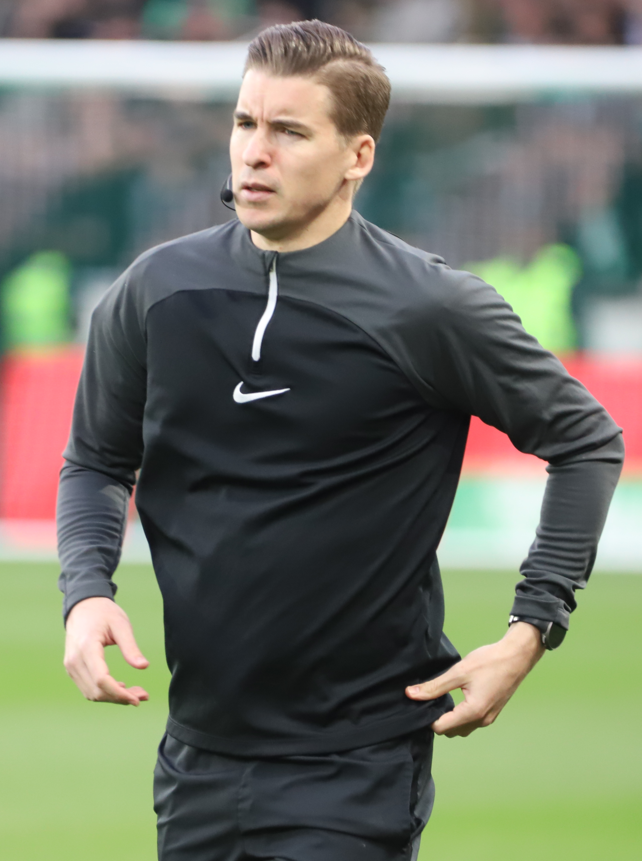
François Letexier

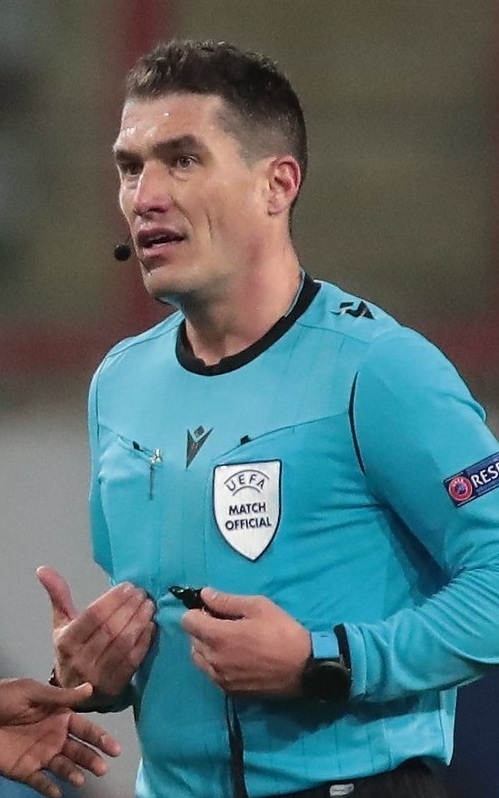
István Kovács

UEFA elite referee category is a referee category which represents the top classification of football referees in Europe. It belongs to the Union of European Football Associations (UEFA) and actually includes the most experienced referees in the global football.

Referees in this category are eligible to officiate the most important matches in UEFA club and international competitions, including the UEFA Champions League and UEFA European Championship.

== Overview ==
UEFA operates a hierarchical referee classification system designed to assess officials based on performance, experience, physical fitness, and consistency. This elite category represents the top tier of this system and consists of a limited number of highly experienced football referees from UEFA member associations who have demonstrated sustained excellence at both domestic and international level.

Referees in the elite category are normally appointed to officiate:

- UEFA Champions League knockout-stage matches.
- UEFA Europa League and UEFA Conference League decisive fixtures.
- UEFA national team competitions, including the UEFA European Championship.

Match appointments are made by the UEFA Referees Committee following assessments by referee observers and performance analysis.

== Selection criteria ==
Promotion to the UEFA elite referee category is based on several factors, including:

- Consistently high performance evaluations in UEFA competitions
- Experience in top domestic leagues
- Physical fitness and technical competence
- Ability to manage high-pressure and high-profile matches

Referees are reviewed annually and may be promoted to or removed from the elite category depending on performance assessments.
