= 2013–14 NK Zavrč season =

Zavrč's debut in Slovenian top division

Zavrč
2013–14 season
- President: Silvo Šterbal
- Head Coach: Viktor Trenevski; Željko Orehovac
- Home stadium: Zavrč Sports Park
- Slovenian League: 5th
- Slovenian Cup: Round of 16
- Top goalscorer: League: Smrekar (nine); All: Kresinger (11)
- Highest home attendance: 2,200 (v. Maribor); 22 September 2013
- Lowest home attendance: 500 (v. Triglav); 28 September 2013; 500 (v. Domžale); 7 May 2014
- Average home league attendance: 747
Home colours	Away colours

The 2013–14 season was Zavrč's first season in the Slovenian PrvaLiga, Slovenian top division.

== Competitions ==
=== League ===
==== Standings ====
Pos	Team	Pld	W	D	L	GF	GA	GD	Pts	Qualification or relegation
3	Rudar	36	18	9	9	55	33	+22	63	Qualification to Europa League first qualifying round
4	Gorica	36	16	10	10	60	32	+28	58	Qualification to Europa League second qualifying round
5	Zavrč	36	16	5	15	58	63	−5	53	
6	Domžale	36	10	15	11	47	36	+11	45	
7	Olimpija	36	12	6	18	38	56	−18	42	

Source: Slovenian PrvaLiga (in Slovene)
Rules for classification: 1) points; 2) goal difference; 3) number of goals scored.

==== Matches ====
12 July 2013 1	Maribor	2–1	Zavrč	Maribor
20:00 CET	Bohar 52'; Milec (yellow card) 64'; Mezga (yellow card) 79'; Fajić 89'	Report (in Slovene)	Golubar 2'; Brlečić (yellow card) 66'; Kelenc (yellow card) 78'	Stadium: Ljudski vrt Attendance: 4,500; Referee: Matej Jug

20 July 2013 2	Zavrč	2–1	Celje	Zavrč
20:00 CET	Kelenc 51'; Kurbus (yellow card) 55'; Brlečić 80'	Report (in Slovene)	Kolman 28', (yellow card) 43'; Jugović (yellow card) 40'; Bajde (yellow card) 50'	Stadium: Sports Park; Attendance: 800; Referee: Roberto Ponis

28 July 2013 3	Triglav Kranj	1–2	Zavrč	Kranj
18:00 CET	Zolić (yellow card) 12'; Klemenčič (yellow card) 22, 61' (red card); Stjepanović (yellow card) 72'; Nukić 87'	Report (in Slovene)	S. Čeh 35', (yellow card) 49'; Golubar (yellow card) 42'; Fuček 76'; Kouter (yellow card) 86'; Murko (yellow card) 90'	Stadium: Stanko Mlakar Stadium; Attendance: 700; Referee: Slavko Vinčić

2 August 2013 4	Zavrč	0–2	Gorica	Zavrč
20:00 CET	Kurbus (yellow card) 25'; Kelenc (yellow card) 89'	Report (in Slovene)	N'Diaye 26'; Coda 46'; Živec (yellow card) 51'	Stadium: Sports Park; Attendance: 700; Referee: Darko Čeferin

10 August 2013 5	Domžale	1–1	Zavrč	Domžale
20:30 CET	Vidmar (yellow card) 24'; Božović (yellow card) 68'; Dobrovoljc 77', (yellow card) 90+3'; Zec (yellow card) 79'	Report (in Slovene)	A. Čeh 30' (pen.); S. Čeh (yellow card) 86'	Stadium: Sports Park; Attendance: 300; Referee: Matej Jug

17 August 2013 6	Krka	3–4	Zavrč	Novo mesto
17:30 CET	Marošević 27' (pen.), 60', 72'; Ihbeisheh (yellow card) 44'; Vučkić (yellow card) 56'	Report (in Slovene)	Kresinger 4'; Kokol (yellow card) 26', (goal) 48'; Matjašič 30', 45'; Golubar (yellow card) 33'	Stadium: Portoval; Attendance: 400; Referee: Mitja Žganec

24 August 2013 7	Zavrč	2–1	Rudar Velenje	Zavrč
20:00 CET	Šafarić 7'; Brlečić (yellow card) 37'; Kresinger 42'; Kurbus (yellow card) 51, 58' (yellow-red card); Kokol (yellow card) 87'	Report (in Slovene)	Črnčič 73'; Klinar (yellow card) 90+1'	Stadium: Sports Park; Attendance: 700; Referee: Roberto Ponis

31 August 2013 8	Koper	1–1	Zavrč	Koper
20:00 CET	Pučko (yellow card) 16'; Čovilo 25'; Halilović (yellow card) 40, 71' (yellow-red card)	Report (in Slovene)	Šafarić (yellow card) 60'; Kokol 62'; Murko (yellow card) 76'; Fuček (yellow card) 90'	Stadium: Bonifika; Attendance: 450; Referee: Mitja Žganec

13 September 2013 9	Zavrč	2–1	Olimpija	Zavrč
20:00 CET	Benko 26'; Golubar 50'; Kurbus (yellow card) 60'	Report (in Slovene)	Fink (yellow card) 29'; Šporar 36'; Trifković (yellow card) 73'; Mitrović (yellow card) 74'	Stadium: Sports Park; Attendance: 1,000; Referee: Darko Čeferin

22 September 2013 10	Zavrč	1–0	Maribor	Zavrč
19:00 CET	Murko 16'; Dugolin (yellow card) 90'	Report (in Slovene)	Rajčević (yellow card) 15'; Ceppelini (yellow card) 63'; Milec (yellow card) 90+4'; Trajkovski (yellow card) 90+4'	Stadium: Zavrč Sports Park; Attendance: 2,200; Referee: Matej Jug

25 September 2013 11	Celje	2–1	Zavrč	Cejle
17:00 CET	Jugović 42'; Žurej 78'	Report (in Slovene)	Kresinger (yellow card) 21'; Šafarić 24' (pen.); Kurbus (yellow card) 29'	Stadium: Arena Petrol; Attendance: 570; Referee: Sašo Habjanič

28 September 2013 12	Zavrč	2–1	Triglav Kranj	Zavrč
19:00 CET	Kresinger 12', (yellow card) 80'; Murko (yellow card) 38'; Kokol (yellow card) 74'; Fuček 86'	Report (in Slovene)	Krcič (yellow card) 35'; Bubanja 89'	Stadium: Sports Park; Attendance: 500; Referee: Damir Skomina

5 October 2013 13	Gorica	4–0	Zavrč	Nova Gorica
18:00 CET	Coda 22'; Misuraca 29'; Kurbus 36' (og.); N'Diaye (yellow card) 45'; Lapadula 60' (pen.)	Report (in Slovene)	Matjašič (yellow card) 51'; Murko (yellow card) 54'	Stadium: Nova Gorica Sports Park; Attendance: 600; Referee: Slavko Vinčić

18 October 2013 14	Zavrč	2–2	Domžale	Zavrč
19:00 CET	Sambolec 5'; Kokol 42', (yellow card) 59'; A. Čeh (yellow card) 90+2'	Report (in Slovene)	Korun 8', (yellow card) 38'; Požeg Vancaš (yellow card) 18'; Vuk 34'; Majer (yellow card) 44'; Skubic (yellow card) 52'; Parker (yellow card) 84'; Husmani (yellow card) 85'	Stadium: Zavrč Sports Park; Attendance: 600; Referee: Nejc Kajtazović

25 October 2013 15	Zavrč	3–0	Krka	Zavrč
19:00 CET	Benko 17', 44'; Kresinger 20'	Report (in Slovene)	Ihbeisheh (yellow card) 40'	Stadium: Zavrč Sports Park; Attendance: 550; Referee: Matej Jug

3 November 2013 16	Rudar Velenje	3–0	Zavrč	Velenje
17:00 CET	Črnčič (yellow card) 19', (goal) 35'; Podlogar (yellow card) 73'; Klinar 90'; Rotman 90+3'	Report (in Slovene)	Sreš (yellow card) 75'; Kokol (yellow card) 89'	Stadium: Ob Jezeru; Attendance: 850; Referee: Slavko Vinčić

8 November 2013 17	Zavrč	1–0	Koper	Zavrč
18:00 CET	A. Čeh (yellow card) 26, 45' (yellow-red card); Kresinger 41'; Kurbus (yellow card) 57'	Report (in Slovene)	Žibert (yellow card) 43'; Guberac (yellow card) 80'; Galešić (yellow card) 86'	Stadium: Sports Park; Attendance: 750; Referee: Mitja Žganec

23 November 2013 18	Olimpija	3–2	Zavrč	Ljubljana
17:00 CET	Djermanović 13', 17'; Ivelja (yellow card) 15'; Mitrović (yellow card) 26'; Omladič 70'; Etémé (yellow card) 85'; Šeliga (yellow card) 90+3'	(in Slovene)	Fink 35' (o.g.); Kokol (yellow card) 72'; Benko 82'	Stadium: Stožice; Attendance: 350; Referee: Bojan Mertik

1 December 2013 19	Maribor	3–4	Zavrč	Maribor
14:30 CET	Vuklišević (yellow card) 20, 43' (yellow-red card); Viler 31'; Fajić 45'; Črnic (yellow card) 55'; Tavares 90+3'	Report (in Slovene)	Kokol 2', (yellow card) 71'; Roj (yellow card) 30'; Kresinger 48'; Golubar (red card) 60'; Kurbus (yellow card) 64'; Kelenc 77'; Šafarić (yellow card) 86'; Matjašič 90'	Stadium: Ljudski vrt Attendance: 2,000; Referee: Damir Skomina

6 December 2013 20	Zavrč	3–0	Celje	Zavrč
17:00 CET	Kresinger 16'; Mihelič 53'; Matjašič (yellow card) 71'; Fuček 80'	Report (in Slovene)	Centrih (yellow card) 76'; Verbič (yellow card) 77'	Stadium: Sports Park; Attendance: 700; Referee: Tadej Mežnar

9 March 2014 21	Triglav Kranj	3–1	Zavrč	Kranj
15:00 CET	Majcen 3'; Poplatnik 8'; Diallo (yellow card) 21'; Djukić (yellow card) 45'; Krcič (yellow card) 55'; Šmit (yellow card) 61'; Šturm (yellow card) 62'; Redžić 71'; Grvala (yellow card) 78, 83' (yellow-red card)	Report (in Slovene)	Kelenc 43'; Murko (yellow card) 70'	Stadium: Stanko Mlakar Stadium; Attendance: 750; Referee: Matej Jug

14 March 2014 22	Zavrč	1–3	Gorica	Zavrč
18:00 CET	Kokol (yellow card) 73'; Kelenc 90+2'	Report (in Slovene)	Coda 12'; Boniperti 26'; Vicente (yellow card) 65'; Lapadula 84'	Stadium: Sports Park; Attendance: 600; Referee: Dragoslav Perić

22 March 2014 23	Domžale	3–0	Zavrč	Domžale
16:30 CET	Živec 14'; Korun (yellow card) 31'; Dobrovoljc (yellow card) 56'; Husmani 72'; Majer (yellow card) 52', (goal) 81'	Report (in Slovene)	Kresinger (yellow card) 61'	Stadium: Sports Park; Attendance: 800; Referee: Damir Skomina

30 March 2014 24	Krka	2–1	Zavrč	Novo mesto
16:00 CET	Kastrevec (yellow card) 69'; Kramar 84', (yellow card) 84'; Buden 89'	Report (in Slovene)	Kokol 13'; Sambolec (yellow card) 27'; S. Čeh (yellow card) 53'; Težak (yellow card) 82'; Matjašič (yellow card) 88'	Stadium: Portoval; Attendance: 400; Referee: Vojko Goričan

5 April 2014 25	Zavrč	1–1	Rudar Velenje	Zavrč
19:00 CET	Smrekar 33'; Golubar (yellow card) 42'; Kokol (red card) 89'	Report (in Slovene)	Klinar (yellow card) 12'; Eterović (yellow card) 35', (goal) 45'; Črnčič (yellow card) 45'; Rotman (yellow card) 62'; Bubalović (yellow card) 66'; Krefl (yellow card) 79'; Rozman (yellow card) 89'	Stadium: Sports Park; Attendance: 650; Referee: Nejc Kajtazović

12 April 2014 26	Koper	2–1	Zavrč	Koper
16:30 CET	Lotrič (yellow card) 22'; Štromajer 27', (yellow card) 45'; Hadžič (yellow card) 76'; Guberac (yellow card) 81'; Črnigoj 85', (yellow card) 86'	Report (in Slovene)	Dugolin (yellow card) 39'; Fuček 77'; Kelenc (yellow card) 86'	Stadium: Bonifika; Attendance: 400; Referee: Dragoslav Perić

16 April 2014 27	Zavrč	3–1	Olimpija	Zavrč
19:30 CET	Težak (yellow card) 5, 79' (yellow-red card); Dugolin 24'; Smrekar 42', 89'	Report (in Slovene)	Omladič 26'; Kapun (yellow card) 53'; Kostić (yellow card) 73'; Škarabot (yellow card) 82'	Stadium: Sports Park; Attendance: 700; Referee: Slavko Vinčić

19 April 2014 28	Zavrč	0–4	Maribor	Zavrč
19:30 CET	Fuček (yellow card) 16'	Report (in Slovene)	Fajić 18', (yellow card) 44'; Mendy (yellow card) 35', (goal) 54'; Milec (yellow card) 45'; Arghus 49'; Vršič 87'	Stadium: Sports Park; Attendance: 1,500; Referee: Davor Drečnik

23 April 2014 29	Celje	0–3	Zavrč	Celje
17:30 CET	Vrhovec (yellow card) 29'; Gobec (yellow card) 57'; Žurej (yellow card) 58'; Žagar-Knez (yellow card) 69'	Report (in Slovene)	Kokol 29'; Smrekar 37', 46'	Stadium: Arena Petrol; Attendance: 570; Referee: Matej Jug

26 April 2014 30	Zavrč	5–1	Triglav Kranj	Zavrč
20:00 CET	Golubar 44', 65'; Smrekar 69', 86', 89', (yellow card) 83'; S. Čeh (yellow card) 80'	Report (in Slovene)	Klemenčič (yellow card) 27'; Diallo (yellow card) 41'; Poljanec (yellow card) 43'; Udovič (yellow card) 67'; Grvala (yellow card) 77', (goal) 84'	Stadium: Sports Park; Attendance: 650; Referee: Dejan Balažič

3 May 2014 31	Gorica	4–0	Zavrč	Nova Gorica
18:00 CET	Boniperti 9', 26', (yellow card) 65'; Misuraca 63'; Danilevičius 69'; Modolo (yellow card) 76'	Report (in Slovene)	Murko (yellow card) 68, 88' (red card); Kurbus (yellow card) 83'	Stadium: Sports Park; Attendance: 250; Referee: Tadej Mežnar

7 May 2014 32	Zavrč	0–0	Domžale	Zavrč
20:00 CET		Report (in Slovene)	Majer (yellow card) 74'; Janža (yellow card) 85'	Stadium: Sports Park; Attendance: 500; Referee: Matej Jug

10 May 2014 33	Zavrč	2–1	Krka	Zavrč
20:00 CET	Smrekar 45'; Sambolec (yellow card) 49'; Dugolin (yellow card) 70'; A. Čeh (yellow card) 75'; Matjašič 87'	Report (in Slovene)	Dežmar (yellow card) 32', (goal) 82'	Stadium: Sports Park; Attendance: 550; Referee: Rade Obrenović

13 May 2014 34	Rudar Velenje	2–3	Zavrč	Velenje
18:00 CET	Bubalović (yellow card) 44'; Eterović 67' (pen.), 93'; Dedić (yellow card) 82'	Report (in Slovene)	Golubar 10'; Kokol (yellow card) 24'; Sambolec 31'; Matjašič (yellow card) 36'; Kresinger (yellow card) 62'; Kelenc 83' (pen.)	Stadium: Ob Jezeru; Attendance: 630; Referee: Marko Podgoršek

17 May 2014 35	Zavrč	1–2	Koper	Zavrč
17:00 CET	Roškar (yellow card) 13'; Golubar (yellow card) 50'; Fuček (yellow card) 57'; Sambolec 60'; Dugolin (yellow card) 69'; Smrekar (yellow card) 74'	Report (in Slovene)	Štromajer 40', 70'; Blažič (yellow card) 71'; Črnigoj (yellow card) 74'	Stadium: Sports Park; Attendance: 600; Referee: Matej Jug

25 May 2014 36	Olimpija	3–2	Zavrč	Ljubljana
17:00 CET	Vukčević 13'; Valenčič 28'; Omladič 31', (yellow card) 90+1'; Jović (yellow card) 52'; Fink (yellow card) 79'; Šeliga (yellow card) 85'	Report (in Slovene)	Sambolec (yellow card) 9'; Kurbus 62'; Kokol (yellow card) 67'; Kelenc 68'	Stadium: Stožice; Attendance: 300; Referee: Bojan Mertik

=== Cup ===
==== First round ====
21 August 2013 First round	Bled	0–8	Zavrč	Bled
16:00 CET		Report (in Slovene)	Dugolin 2'; Kresinger 41', 50', 62', 80'; Fuček 71', 90+1' (pen.); Kokol 88'	Stadium: Bled Sports Centre; Attendance: 200; Referee: Dejan Balažič

==== Round of 16 ====
18 September 2013 Round of 16	Celje	4–0	Zavrč	Celje
17:00 CET	Jugović 18'; Zajc (yellow card) 21'; Gobec (yellow card) 29', (goal) 70'; Čadikovski 39'; Žurej 41', (yellow card) 55'; Vrhovec (yellow card) 65'; Plesec (yellow card) 75'	Report (in Slovene)	Majer (yellow card) 9', (red card) 40'; Sambolec (yellow card) 36'; Roj (yellow card) 69'	Stadium: Arena Petrol; Attendance: 500; Referee: Davor Drečnik

== Transfers ==
=== In ===
Player	From/last
Rene Mihelič	Nacional
Aleš Majer	Maribor
Rok Roj	Volendam
Tilen Lešnik	Maribor
Dino Kresinger	Western Sydney Wanderers FC
Dejan Kurbus	Mura 05
Nikola Šafarić	Kaposvári Rákóczi FC
Mario Brlečić	Split
Josip Fuček	Split
Matija Kovačić	Slaven Belupo
Luka Bešenič	Podravina
Matija Smrekar	Maribor
Arpad Vaš	Aluminij
Marko Rog	Varaždin
Karlo Težak	Gorica
Dominik Božak	Vidm

=== Out ===
Player	To
Uroš Gabrovec	Gerečja vas
Rok Letonja	Aluminij
Denis Kuserbanj	Podvinci
Rok Roj	Taraz
Rene Mihelič	Debrecen
Jože Benko	Jennersdorf
Aleš Majer	Free transfer
Leon Sreš	Beltinci
Nino Kouter	Free transfer

== Top goalscorers ==
Player	Goals
Dino Kresinger	11
Matija Smrekar	9
Miha Kokol	7
Josip Fuček	6
Doris Kelenc	6
Josip Golubar	5
Jože Benko	4
Jure Matjašič	4
Boris Sambolec	3

== See also ==
- 2013–14 Slovenian PrvaLiga
- 2013–14 Slovenian Cup
