= 2012–13 NK Maribor season =

NK Maribor
2012–13 season
- President: Drago Cotar
- Head Coach: Darko Milanič
- Stadium: Ljudski vrt
- Slovenian League: Winners
- Slovenian Cup: Winners
- Slovenian Supercup: Winners
- Champions League: Play-off round
- Europa League: Group stage
- Top goalscorer: League: Marcos Tavares (17); All: Marcos Tavares (26)
- Highest home attendance: 12,420 vs Dinamo (28 August 2012)
- Lowest home attendance: 900 vs Domžale (16 March 2013)
- Average home league attendance: 2,833
| Home colours | Away colours |

The 2012–13 season was the 53rd season in the history of NK Maribor and the club's 22nd consecutive season in the Slovenian PrvaLiga since the league establishment in 1991. The team participated in the Slovenian PrvaLiga, Slovenian Football Cup, UEFA Champions League, and UEFA Europa League. The season covers the period from 1 June 2012 to 31 May 2013. Darko Milanič was a head coach of the club.

== Supercup ==
The 2012 Slovenian Supercup was the eighth edition of the Slovenian Supercup, an annual football match contested by the winners of the previous season's Slovenian PrvaLiga and Slovenian Cup competitions. However, Maribor has won the double during the 2011–12 season, having finished first in the 2011–12 Slovenian PrvaLiga and 2011–12 Slovenian Football Cup. As a consequence and according to the rules of the Football Association of Slovenia, they played the 2012 Supercup against the runners-up of the PrvaLiga, Olimpija. This was the first major domestic cup final of Olimpija, since the club was established in 2005. Maribor won the match 2–1 and secured their second supercup title.

| 8 July 2012 Final | Olimpija | 1–2 | Maribor | Maribor |
| 20:00 CET | Ivelja 50'; Radujko (yellow card) 59'; Trifković (yellow card) 62'; Jović (yellow card) 89' | Report (in Slovene) | Filipović 27'; Mertelj (yellow card) 35' (yellow card) 90' (red card); Ibraimi 78' | Stadium: Ljudski vrt Attendance: 4,150; Referee: Damir Skomina |

Colour key: Green = Maribor win; Yellow = draw; Red = opponents win.

== Slovenian League ==
=== Standings ===
| Pos | Team | Pld | W | D | L | GF | GA | GD | Pts | Qualification or relegation |
|---|---|---|---|---|---|---|---|---|---|---|
| 1 | Maribor (C) | 36 | 24 | 6 | 6 | 80 | 35 | +45 | 78 | Qualification to Champions League second qualifying round |
| 2 | Olimpija | 36 | 21 | 7 | 8 | 73 | 35 | +38 | 70 | Qualification to Europa League second qualifying round |
| 3 | Domžale | 36 | 17 | 9 | 10 | 42 | 34 | +8 | 60 | Qualification to Europa League first qualifying round |
| 4 | Koper | 36 | 14 | 13 | 9 | 52 | 42 | +10 | 55 | |
| 5 | Celje | 36 | 12 | 13 | 11 | 39 | 39 | 0 | 49 | Qualification to Europa League first qualifying round (Note: Maribor won the 2012–13 Slovenian Football Cup, so the cup-winner spot in 2013–14 UEFA Europa League second qualifying round passed to the 2nd-placed Olimpija Ljubljana, and Celje took the first qualifying round spot as cup runners-up.) |

Source: Slovenian PrvaLiga (in Slovene)
Rules for classification: 1) points; 2) goal difference; 3) number of goals scored.
(C) Champions

==== Results summary ====
| Overall | | | | | | | | Home | | | | | | Away | | | | | |
| Pld | W | D | L | GF | GA | GD | Pts | W | D | L | GF | GA | GD | W | D | L | GF | GA | GD |
|---|---|---|---|---|---|---|---|---|---|---|---|---|---|---|---|---|---|---|---|
| 36 | 24 | 6 | 6 | 80 | 35 | +45 | 78 | 14 | 2 | 2 | 42 | 14 | +28 | 10 | 4 | 4 | 38 | 21 | +17 |

Last updated: 26 May 2013.

==== Results by round ====
| Round | 1 | 2 | 3 | 4 | 5 | 6 | 7 | 8 | 9 | 10 | 11 | 12 | 13 | 14 | 15 | 16 | 17 | 18 | 19 | 20 | 21 | 22 | 23 | 24 | 25 | 26 | 27 | 28 | 29 | 30 | 31 | 32 | 33 | 34 | 35 | 36 |
|---|---|---|---|---|---|---|---|---|---|---|---|---|---|---|---|---|---|---|---|---|---|---|---|---|---|---|---|---|---|---|---|---|---|---|---|---|
| Ground | A | H | A | H | A | H | A | H | A | H | A | H | A | H | A | H | A | H | A | H | A | H | A | H | A | H | A | H | A | H | A | H | A | H | A | H |
| Result | W | D | W | W | D | W | W | W | W | W | W | W | L | W | D | L | W | W | W | W | W | W | D | L | L | W | W | W | L | W | W | W | D | W | L | D |
| Position | 2 | 3 | 1 | 1 | 1 | 1 | 1 | 1 | 1 | 1 | 1 | 1 | 1 | 1 | 1 | 1 | 1 | 1 | 1 | 1 | 1 | 1 | 1 | 1 | 1 | 1 | 1 | 1 | 1 | 1 | 1 | 1 | 1 | 1 | 1 | 1 |

Updated to match(es) played on 26 May 2013. Source: PrvaLiga website
A = Away; H = Home; W = Win; D = Draw; L = Loss

=== Matches ===
| 14 July 2012 1 | Gorica | 1–3 | Maribor | Nova Gorica |
| 18:00 CET | Žigon 67' | Report | Mezga 23', 54'; Handanović (yellow card) 38'; Rajčević (yellow card) 46'; Vetrih 65' (o.g.) | Stadium: Sports Park; Attendance: 600; Referee: Dejan Balažič |

| 21 July 2012 2 | Maribor | 0–0 | Koper | Maribor |
| 20:00 CET | Filipović (yellow card) 38'; Komazec (yellow card) 44' | Report | Palčič (yellow card) 7' (yellow card) 56' (red card); Bagarić (yellow card) 90+2' | Stadium: Ljudski vrt Attendance: 1,500; Referee: Matej Jug |

| 29 July 2012 3 | Mura 05 | 1–3 | Maribor | Murska Sobota |
| 18:00 CET | Sreš (yellow card) 40'; Kouter (yellow card) 45'; Fajić 84' (yellow card) 85'; Majer (yellow card) 87' | Report | Vidović 23'; Ploj 49'; Komazec 72' | Stadium: Fazanerija; Attendance: 2,400; Referee: Darko Čeferin |

| 4 August 2012 4 | Maribor | 1–0 | Triglav Kranj | Maribor |
| 20:00 CET | Tavares 86' (pen.) | Report | Roškar (yellow card) 86' | Stadium: Ljudski vrt Attendance: 1,300; Referee: Vojko Goričan |

| 11 August 2012 5 | Olimpija | 0–0 | Maribor | Ljubljana |
| 20:30 CET | Sarasola (yellow card) 12'; Božič (yellow card) 25'; Sretenović (yellow card) 39' | Report | Filipović (yellow card) 33'; Arghus (red card) 45+1'; Tavares (yellow card) 71' | Stadium: Stožice; Attendance: 5,500; Referee: Matej Jug |

| 18 August 2012 6 | Maribor | 2–1 | Domžale | Maribor |
| 20:00 CET | Mezga (yellow card) 33'; Tavares 40' 87'; Milec (yellow card) 52'; Potokar (yellow card) 68' | Report | Osmanaj (yellow card) 54'; Husmani (yellow card) 55'; Zec (yellow card) 61'; Knezović 74' | Stadium: Ljudski vrt Attendance: 1,500; Referee: Andrej Žnidaršič |

| 25 August 2012 7 | Celje | 0–2 | Maribor | Celje |
| 20:00 CET | | Report | Lesjak (yellow card) 29'; Ploj 31'; Črnic 73' | Stadium: Arena Petrol; Attendance: 2,500; Referee: Roberto Ponis |

| 1 September 2012 8 | Maribor | 4–0 | Rudar Velenje | Maribor |
| 20:00 CET | Berić 15'; Cvijanović 34'; Tavares 83'; Ploj 90' | Report | Stjepanović (yellow card) 65' | Stadium: Ljudski vrt Attendance: 1,000; Referee: Boris Tošeski |

| 15 September 2012 9 | Aluminij | 1–5 | Maribor | Kidričevo |
| 16:00 CET | Drevenšek (yellow card) 5' (goal) 34' (pen.); Bešić (yellow card) 30'; Kožar (yellow card) 88' | Report | Rajčević 15'; Berić 18'; Milec (yellow card) 22'; Cvijanović 65' 80'; Filipović (yellow card) 72'; Ploj 84' | Stadium: Sports Park; Attendance: 2,000; Referee: Damir Skomina |

| 23 September 2012 10 | Maribor | 4–0 | Gorica | Maribor |
| 19:00 CET | Ploj 11' (yellow card) 31'; Berić 14', 60'; Vidović 69' | Report | Vetrih (yellow card) 68' | Stadium: Ljudski vrt Attendance: 2,000; Referee: Dragoslav Perić |

| 26 September 2012 11 | Koper | 2–3 | Maribor | Koper |
| 20:00 CET | Bubalo (yellow card) 24'; Đukić (yellow card) 34'; Čadikovski 37'; Žibert 68'; Majcen (yellow card) 77'; Blažič (yellow card) 83' | Report | Cvijanović 19'; Mejač 41'; Tavares 43'; Trajkovski (yellow card) 77' | Stadium: Bonifika; Attendance: 2,000; Referee: Dejan Balažič |

| 30 September 2012 12 | Maribor | 1–0 | Mura 05 | Maribor |
| 18:00 CET | Cvijanović 8'; Trajkovski (yellow card) 37'; Arghus (yellow card) 45' | Report | Eterović (yellow card) 45'; Boakye (yellow card) 74'; Kramar (yellow card) 76'; Bohar (yellow card) 87' | Stadium: Ljudski vrt Attendance: 3,000; Referee: Matej Jug |

| 7 October 2012 13 | Triglav Kranj | 1–0 | Maribor | Kranj |
| 15:00 CET | Poplatnik 9' | Report | Mejač (yellow card) 12'; Rajčević (yellow card) 15'; Arghus (red card) 44'; Lesjak (yellow card) 87' | Stadium: Stanko Mlakar Stadium; Attendance: 1,000; Referee: Andrej Tratnjek |

| 20 October 2012 14 | Maribor | 1–0 | Olimpija | Maribor |
| 20:00 CET | Tavares 89' (pen.) (yellow card) 90' | Report | Zarifović (red card) 28' | Stadium: Ljudski vrt Attendance: 9,000; Referee: Damir Skomina |

| 28 November 2012^{15} 15 | Domžale | 2–2 | Maribor | Domžale |
| 18:00 CET | Ihbeisheh 61', 68'; Korun (yellow card) 39' | Report | Berić 23' (yellow card) 51'; Tavares 67' | Stadium: Sports Park; Attendance: 1,100; Referee: Dragoslav Perić |

| 3 November 2012 16 | Maribor | 1–2 | Celje | Maribor |
| 18:00 CET | Mezga 25' (pen.); Filipović (yellow card) 58'; Milec (yellow card) 86'; Rajčević (yellow card) 88' | Report | Bajde 11'; Verbič (yellow card) 12'; Gobec (yellow card) 15'; Krajcer (yellow card) 18' (goal) 88'; Vrhovec (yellow card) 72' | Stadium: Ljudski vrt Attendance: 1,500; Referee: Andrej Tratnjek |

| 13 March 2013^{17} 17 | Rudar Velenje | 0–3 | Maribor | Velenje |
| 17:00 CET | Firer (yellow card) 7' | Report | Fajić 11'; Berić 86'; Bubalović 90+2' (o.g.) | Stadium: Ob Jezeru; Attendance: 800; Referee: Bojan Mertik |

| 11 November 2012 18 | Maribor | 2–1 | Aluminij | Maribor |
| 16:00 CET | Ploj 10'; Komazec 43' | Report | Kašnik (yellow card) 54'; Bingo 90+3' | Stadium: Ljudski vrt Attendance: 1,000; Referee: Dragoslav Perić |

| 17 November 2012 19 | Gorica | 1–6 | Maribor | Nova Gorica |
| 14:00 CET | Širok 41' | Report | Cvijanović 12'; Mezga (yellow card) 16'; Mertelj (yellow card) 56'; Ibraimi 65', 84'; Tavares 66' 68', 89' | Stadium: Sports Park; Attendance: 350; Referee: Miran Bukovec |

| 25 November 2012 20 | Maribor | 3–0 | Koper | Maribor |
| 16:00 CET | Ibraimi 9', 90+3'; Rajčević (yellow card) 45'; Komazec 65' | Report | Đukić (yellow card) 68'; Hadžić (yellow card) 88' | Stadium: Ljudski vrt Attendance: 1,500; Referee: Darko Čeferin |

| 2 December 2012 21 | Mura 05 | 1–2 | Maribor | Murska Sobota |
| 13:00 CET | Eterović (yellow card) 38'; Bohar 78'; Aborah (yellow card) 80'; Janža (yellow card) 90+2' | Report | Mezga 74'; Cvijanović 76'; Mejač (yellow card) 79'; Komazec (yellow card) 80' (yellow-red card) 90'; Handanović (yellow card) 84' | Stadium: Fazanerija; Attendance: 700; Referee: Damir Skomina |

| 2 March 2013 22 | Maribor | 4–1 | Triglav Kranj | Maribor |
| 18:30 CET | Berić 5'; Cvijanović 30'; Tavares 39'; Milec 49'; Mertelj (yellow card) 55'; Hotić (yellow card) 66' | Report | Đurković 60'; Klemenčič (yellow card) 75'; Zolić (yellow card) 85' | Stadium: Ljudski vrt Attendance: 1,800; Referee: Dejan Balažič |

| 10 March 2013 23 | Olimpija | 1–1 | Maribor | Ljubljana |
| 17:00 CET | Jović (yellow card) 40'; Zarifović (yellow card) 57'; Nikezić 58'; Trifković (yellow card) 70'; Božič (yellow card) 90+1' | Report | Fajić 22'; Mertelj (yellow card) 42'; Arghus (yellow card) 44'; Handanović (red card) 70'; Ibraimi (yellow card) 70' | Stadium: Stožice; Attendance: 2,000; Referee: Darko Čeferin |

| 16 March 2013 24 | Maribor | 1–3 | Domžale | Maribor |
| 20:00 CET | Fajić (yellow card) 62' (goal) 74'; Rajčević (yellow card) 69' | Report | Vuk 3' 14'; Balkovec 20' (yellow card) 40'; Vidmar (yellow card) 85'; Knezović (yellow card) 90+2' | Stadium: Ljudski vrt Attendance: 900; Referee: Roberto Ponis |

| 17 April 2013^{25} 25 | Celje | 2–1 | Maribor | Celje |
| 20:30 CET | Žurej 2'; Vidmajer (yellow card) 21'; Srdić 26'; Tomažič Šeruga (yellow card) 59'; Gobec (yellow card) 62' | Report | Filipović (yellow card) 37'; Berić 42'; Fajić (yellow card) 85' | Stadium: Arena Petrol; Attendance: 450; Referee: Davor Drečnik |

| 30 March 2013 26 | Maribor | 3–1 | Rudar Velenje | Maribor |
| 17:30 CET | Mezga 6'; Milec (yellow card) 25'; Tavares 65'; Berić 77' | Report | Berko (yellow card) 69'; Podlogar (yellow card) 80' (goal) 86' | Stadium: Ljudski vrt Attendance: 1,200; Referee: Damir Skomina |

| 6 April 2013 27 | Aluminij | 1–2 | Maribor | Kidričevo |
| 16:00 CET | Kurež 44'; Topolovec (yellow card) 67'; Hodžurda (yellow card) 90+1'; Jeleč (yellow card) 90+2' | Report | Fajić 20'; Potokar (yellow card) 54' (yellow card) 73' (red card); Cvijanović 90+3' | Stadium: Sports Park; Attendance: 700; Referee: Dragoslav Perić |

| 13 April 2013 28 | Maribor | 2–1 | Gorica | Maribor |
| 17:30 CET | Milec 14'; Fajić (yellow card) 25'; Arghus 31'; Ibraimi (red card) 55'; Viler (yellow card) 69' | Report | Mbida (yellow card) 74'; Širok (yellow card) 75'; Bremec 85' | Stadium: Ljudski vrt Attendance: 2,400; Referee: Andrej Žnidaršič |

| 20 April 2013 29 | Koper | 2–1 | Maribor | Koper |
| 20:00 CET | Galešić (yellow card) 12' (goal) 44'; Čovilo 54'; Mavrič (yellow card) 71'; Bradaschia (yellow card) 73'; Nenezič (yellow card) 90+4' | Report | Tavares 40'; Berić (yellow card) 66'; Potokar (yellow card) 88' | Stadium: Bonifika; Attendance: 1,000; Referee: Miran Bukovec |

| 27 April 2013 30 | Maribor | 4–0 | Mura 05 | Maribor |
| 20:00 CET | Ibraimi 6', 22'; Cvijanović 52'; Filipović (yellow card) 55'; Milec (yellow card) 82'; Berić 90' | Report | Barbič (yellow card) 67'; Šimić (yellow card) 75'; Vinko (yellow card) 78'; Rep (yellow card) 89' | Stadium: Ljudski vrt Attendance: 3,500; Referee: Matej Jug |

| 4 May 2013 31 | Triglav Kranj | 1–2 | Maribor | Kranj |
| 17:00 CET | Jelar (yellow card) 10'; Stojnić (yellow card) 16'; Poplatnik 53'; Šmit (yellow card) 71' | Report | Potokar (yellow card) 38'; Mezga 45'; Arghus (yellow card) 74'; Berić 90+1'; Smrekar (yellow card) 90+2' | Stadium: Stanko Mlakar Stadium; Attendance: 550; Referee: Roberto Ponis |

| 11 May 2013 32 | Maribor | 2–1 | Olimpija | Maribor |
| 20:00 CET | Filipović (yellow card) 20'; Cvijanović 33'; Berić (yellow card) 65' (goal) 73'; Tavares (yellow card) 69'; Mezga (yellow card) 89'; Handanović (yellow card) 90+3' | Report | Delamea Mlinar (yellow card) 20'; Lovrečič 45'; Fink (yellow card) 46' (yellow card) 65' (red card); Omladič (yellow card) 58' | Stadium: Ljudski vrt Attendance: 9,000; Referee: Damir Skomina |

| 14 May 2013 33 | Domžale | 1–1 | Maribor | Domžale |
| 18:00 CET | Knezović (yellow card) 48'; Vuk 63' | Report | Mertelj 82' | Stadium: Sports Park; Attendance: 1,200; Referee: Bojan Mertik |

| 18 May 2013 34 | Maribor | 5–1 | Celje | Maribor |
| 17:30 CET | Mezga 12'; Potokar (yellow card) 19'; Tavares 43', 47', 64'; Cvijanović 60' | Report | Žurej (yellow card) 58'; Bajić 69'; Vrhovec (yellow card) 87' | Stadium: Ljudski vrt Attendance: 1,400; Referee: Dragoslav Perić |

| 22 May 2013 35 | Rudar Velenje | 3–1 | Maribor | Velenje |
| 17:30 CET | Kašnik 21'; Firer 55'; Stjepanović (yellow card) 58'; Jahič (yellow card) 59'; Eterović 77'; Črnčič (yellow card) 90+1' | Report | Dedić 18' (o.g.) | Stadium: Ob Jezeru; Attendance: 800; Referee: Nejc Kajtazović |

| 26 May 2013 36 | Maribor | 2–2 | Aluminij | Maribor |
| 17:30 CET | Berić (yellow card) 20' (goal) 24'; Tavares 85' | Report | Rešek 27' (yellow card) 37'; Kurež 73' | Stadium: Ljudski vrt Attendance: 7,500; Referee: Miran Bukovec |

Colour key: Green = Maribor win; Yellow = draw; Red = opponents win.

Notes

- Note 1: The match was postponed to a later date due to bad pitch conditions.
- Note 2: The match was postponed to a later date due to Maribor's UEFA Europa League campaign.
- Note 3: All matches of the 25th round were postponed by one week due to snowfall. The match between Celje and Maribor was originally scheduled for 2 April 2013, but was postponed and rescheduled for 17 April 2013, once again due to snowfall.

== Slovenian Cup ==
| 31 October 2012^{1} Round of 16 | Zavrč | 0–2 | Maribor | Zavrč |
| 19:00 CET | Dugolin (yellow card) 36'; Murko (yellow card) 69'; A. Čeh (yellow card) 69' | Report | Berić 26'; Mezga 31'; Mejač (yellow card) 88'; Filipović (yellow card) 90+2' | Stadium: Zavrč Sports Park; Attendance: 2,000; Referee: Vojko Goričan |

| 27 February 2013^{2} Quarter-finals 1st leg | Olimpija | 1–3 | Maribor | Ljubljana |
| 18:30 CET | Valenčič (yellow card) 57'; Omladič 61'; Delamea Mlinar (yellow card) 71'; Džafić (red card) 83' | Report | Potokar (yellow card) 57'; Milec (yellow card) 65'; Mezga 69', 87' (pen.); Rajčević 90+1' | Stadium: Stožice; Attendance: 4,000; Referee: Damir Skomina |

| 6 March 2013 Quarter-finals 2nd leg | Maribor | 0–1 (3–2 agg.) | Olimpija | Maribor |
| 17:00 CET | Mezga (yellow card) 35'; Viler (yellow card) 80'; Tavares (yellow card) 90+1' | Report | Valenčič 5'; Kapun (yellow card) 69'; Omladič (yellow card) 72'; Baskera (yellow card) 83'; Kovačević (yellow card) 87' | Stadium: Ljudski vrt Attendance: 5,000; Referee: Matej Jug |

| 1 May 2013^{3} Semi-finals 1st leg | Triglav Kranj | 2–2 | Maribor | Kranj |
| 17:00 CET | Bubanja 14'; Šturm (yellow card) 39'; Đurković 76' | Report | Mezga 8'; Ibraimi (yellow card) 60'; Mertelj (yellow card) 65'; Tavares 90' | Stadium: Stanko Mlakar Stadium; Attendance: 800; Referee: Davor Drečnik |

| 8 May 2013^{4} Semi-finals 2nd leg | Maribor | 3–0 (5–2 agg.) | Triglav Kranj | Maribor |
| 20:00 CET | Tavares 50', 73', 77' | Report | Šturm (yellow card) 20'; Jelar (yellow card) 77' | Stadium: Ljudski vrt Attendance: 2,000; Referee: Vojko Goričan |

| 29 May 2013 Final | Maribor | 1–0 | Celje | Koper |
| 20:45 CET | Ibraimi 44' | Report | Vrhovec (yellow card) 29'; Verbič (yellow card) 82'; Plesec (yellow card) 86' | Stadium: Bonifika; Attendance: 1,500; Referee: Matej Jug |

Colour key: Green = Maribor win; Yellow = draw; Red = opponents win.

Notes

- Note 1: The match between Zavrč and Maribor was rescheduled from 19 September to 31 October 2012, as Maribor played their first match of the 2012–13 UEFA Europa League on 20 September.
- Note 2: The first leg of the quarter-final match between Olimpija and Maribor was originally scheduled on 23 February 2013. However, after starting on schedule, the match was suspended in the 24th minute due to heavy snowfall. The match was then rescheduled for 27 February, the date originally intended for the second leg match in Maribor.
- Note 3: The first leg of the semi-final was rescheduled from 10 April to 1 May 2013 due to rescheduling of the matches in the Slovenian PrvaLiga.
- Note 4: The second leg of the semi-final was rescheduled from 17 April to 8 May 2013 due to rescheduling of the matches in the Slovenian PrvaLiga.

== European campaign ==
=== UEFA Champions League ===
Qualified as the 2012–13 Slovenian PrvaLiga champions, Maribor started their European campaign in the second qualifying round of the 2012–13 UEFA Champions League against Bosnian Premier League champions Željezničar. This was the first meeting in UEFA competitions between Maribor and a team from Bosnia and Herzegovina. The first leg was played at Ljudski vrt, the home of Maribor. The match started poorly for the home side as shortly after the missed scoring opportunity from Agim Ibraimi, Maribor soon found themselves a goal behind when Eldin Adilović scored the opener in the 15th minute. Maribor then took control and tried to score an equalizer before half time, however, they were unsuccessful and the score was 1–0, in favour of the Bosnian side, at the 45 minute mark. Maribor dominated during the second half and was able to capitalize on their chances. Berić scored the first goal for the home side in the 47th minute, with Dejan Mezga adding the second one in the 67th, from penalty. Berić, who was man of the match, scored his second goal in the 76th minute, giving his side a 3–1 lead. He did not stop there as in the 90th minute he assisted team captain Marcos Tavares, who scored his first goal of the season, for the final score 4–1. The second leg was played a week later in Sarajevo and was followed by over 500 Maribor supporters. Željezničar plays their home matches at Grbavica Stadium, however, their stadium did not meet UEFA stadia criteria and they were forced to play at Asim Ferhatović Hase Olympic stadium. The home side needed a three goals victory to progress to the next round and had couple of chances to score early in the match, including a disallowed goal from Adilović who was in offside position. Their plans for an early lead were shattered, however, when Ibraimi scored from a long range effort in the 20th minute, which was the only goal during the first half. Second half started poorly for the Bosnians when Čolić received his second booking and was subsequently sent off. Željezničar bounced back in the 59th minute when Josip Kvesić scored an equalizer. However, soon afterwards the nervous home players received two red cards in a matter of minutes and had to finish the match with only eight players. Maribor then prevailed, took the ball possession and finished the match with the goal from Tavares, for the final score of the match 2–1, and 6–2 aggregate.

The match between Maribor and Dudelange attracted a crowd of 12,025.

In the third qualifying round, Maribor faced Dudelange from Luxembourg, a team which made a big upset by eliminating Austrian champions Salzburg. This was the second year in a row for Maribor to face Dudelange. During the 2011–12 season Maribor played against them in the second qualifying round of the 2011–12 UEFA Champions League and was successful with two victories and the score 5–1 aggregate. The first match against the Luxembourg champions was played on 1 August 2012 at Ljudski vrt. Being fully aware that a two-legged victory over Dudelange secures, at least, the UEFA Europa League group stages, Maribor players started their home match strong and quickly took the lead with a free kick goal by Mezga. Another free kick goal followed in the 38th minute when Mezga left the ball to Tavares who scored with a strong shot to the lower left corner, for the half-time score 2–0. It took only two minutes of the second half for the home players to score the third goal, when Mezga scored another long range effort from outside of the penalty box. In the 77th minute Berić continued his good form, having scored his third goal in as many 2012–13 UEFA qualifying matches. This goal was not the last, however, as Aurélien Joachim took advantage of a mistake from Aleksander Rajčević and scored in the 92nd minute for the final score of 4–1. One week later, Maribor again proved too strong for the Luxembourg champions and won 1–0, with the goal by Aleš Mertelj in the 79th minute. Similarly to the 2011–12 season, Maribor again secured two victories over Dudelange with an aggregate score of 5–1.

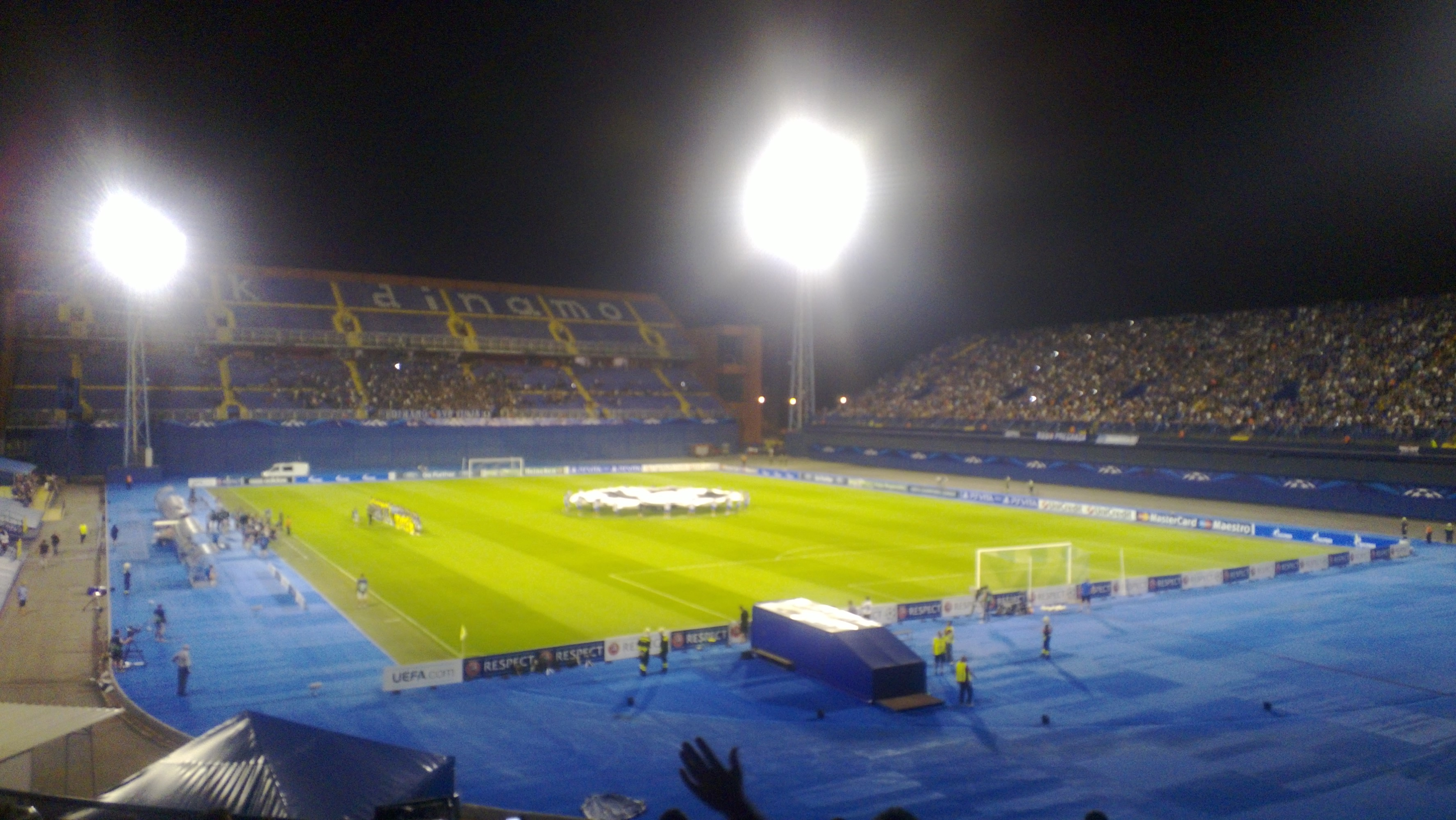
Dinamo Zagreb and Maribor moments before the start of the match on 22 August 2012

For the play-off round of the UEFA Champions League, Maribor was drawn against Croatian champions Dinamo Zagreb. This was the second time the two clubs have met in the UEFA competitions, having faced each other during the 2003–04 UEFA Champions League qualifying stages, when Dinamo secured a close 2–1 aggregate victory. The first leg was played at Stadion Maksimir in front of 20,135 spectators, over 1,000 of which were Maribor supporters, a record for the most fans gathered on Maribor's away matches at the time. Dinamo were the favorites and took an early lead with a goal by Duje Čop. Dinamo continued to play well and had couple of more chances, but it was Maribor who scored the second goal, from an own goal scored by Dinamo's captain Milan Badelj. Both teams had chances to take the lead in the second half, and in the 74th minute, Dinamo regained the lead with a goal from Badelj. Shortly afterwards, Maribor's Berić had a good chance to equalize, but was unsuccessful. Right at the end, Sammir had a chance to increase the lead for the home team, however, his free-kick attempt narrowly missed the target. The second leg match in Maribor was attended by 12,420 spectators, the highest of the 2012–13 season. Dinamo, however, proved again to be too strong and after taking another early lead, they comfortably held the result until the end, with couple of good chances to increase the lead. Dinamo thus won 3–1 on aggregate and advanced to the Champions league group stages for the second successive season. Despite the defeat, Maribor made it to the group stage of the UEFA Europa League.

==== Second qualifying round ====
| 18 July 2012 First leg | Maribor (Slovenia) | 4–1 | (Bosnia and Herzegovina) Željezničar Sarajevo | Maribor, Slovenia |
| 20:00 CET | Berić 47', 76'; Mezga 67' (pen.); Rajčević (yellow card) 90'; Tavares 90+2' | Report; Report (in Slovene) | Adilović 15' (yellow card) 55'; Svraka (yellow card) 18'; Kerla (yellow card) 37'; Bogičević (yellow card) 67'; Jamak (yellow card) 69' | Stadium: Ljudski vrt Attendance: 10,000; Referee: Thorsten Kinhöfer (Germany |

| 24 July 2012 Second leg | Željezničar Sarajevo (Bosnia and Herzegovina) | 1–2 (2–6 agg.) | (Slovenia) Maribor | Sarajevo, Bosnia and Herzegovina |
| 21:00 CET | Čolić (yellow card) 2' (yellow card) 53' (red card); Bešlija (yellow card) 14'; Zolotić (yellow card) 39'; Adilović (yellow card) 54'; Kvesić 59'; Stanić (red card) 61'; Svraka (yellow card) 63' (yellow card) 64' (red card); Bekrić (yellow card) 65' | Report; Report (in Slovene) | Ibraimi 20'; Potokar (yellow card) 52'; Tavares 86' | Stadium: Asim Ferhatović Hase^{2} Attendance: 8,000; Referee: Danny Makkelie (Netherlands) |

Colour key: Green = Maribor win; Yellow = draw; Red = opponents win.

==== Third qualifying round ====
| 1 August 2012 First leg | Maribor (Slovenia) | 4–1 | (Luxembourg) Dudelange | Maribor, Slovenia |
| 20:00 CET | Mezga 13', 47'; Tavares 38'; Rajčević (yellow card) 63'; Berić 77' | Report; Report (in Slovene) | Steinmetz (yellow card) 26'; Hug (yellow card) 79'; Da Mota (yellow card) 80'; Melisse (yellow card) 83'; Joachim 90+2' | Stadium: Ljudski vrt Attendance: 12,025; Referee: Aleksei Nikolaev (Russia) |

| 8 August 2012 Second leg | Dudelange (Luxembourg) | 0–1 (1–5 agg.) | (Slovenia) Maribor | Dudelange, Luxembourg |
| 17:00 CET | Tournut (yellow card) 39'; Steinmetz (yellow card) 71' | Report; Report (in Slovene) | Mezga (yellow card) 37'; Mertelj 79'; Potokar (yellow card) 90' | Stadium: Stade Jos Nosbaum; Attendance: 1,300; Referee: Duarte Gomes (Portugal) |

Colour key: Green = Maribor win; Yellow = draw; Red = opponents win.

==== Play-off round ====
| 22 August 2012 First leg | Dinamo Zagreb (Croatia) | 2–1 | (Slovenia) Maribor | Zagreb, Croatia |
| 20:45 CET | Čop 10'; Ademi (yellow card) 18'; Vida (yellow card) 28'; Leko (yellow card) 38'; Badelj 74' (yellow card) 75'; Šimunić (yellow card) 80' | Report; Report (in Slovene) | Mertelj (yellow card) 31'; Badelj 39' (o.g.) | Stadium: Maksimir; Attendance: 20,135; Referee: Cüneyt Çakır (Turkey) |

| 28 August 2012 Second leg | Maribor (Slovenia) | 0–1 (1–3 agg.) | (Croatia) Dinamo Zagreb | Maribor, Slovenia |
| 20:45 CET | Handanović (yellow card) 13'; Arghus (red card) 84'; Tavares (yellow card) 84' | Report; Report (in Slovene) | Tonel 12'; Ademi (yellow card) 16'; Badelj (yellow card) 36'; Vida (yellow card) 71' | Stadium: Ljudski vrt Attendance: 12,420; Referee: David Fernández Borbalán (Spain) |

Colour key: Green = Maribor win; Yellow = draw; Red = opponents win.

Notes

- Note 1: Željezničar played their home match at Asim Ferhatović Hase Stadium in Sarajevo, as their own Grbavica Stadium did not meet UEFA criteria.

=== UEFA Europa League ===
Lazio and Maribor at Stadio Olimpico on 4 October 2012

Tottenham and Maribor at White Hart Lane on 8 November 2012

==== Group J ====
| 20 September 2012 1 | Maribor (Slovenia) | 3–0 | (Greece) Panathinaikos | Maribor, Slovenia |
| 21:05 CET | Berić 25' (yellow card) 90'; Ibraimi 62' (yellow card) 63'; Tavares 88' (pen.) | Report; Report (in Slovene) | Vitolo (yellow card) 75'; Spyropoulos (yellow card) 84' (yellow card) 90+3' (red card); Velázquez (yellow card) 87' | Stadium: Ljudski vrt Attendance: 10,000; Referee: Alan Kelly (Ireland) |

| 4 October 2012 2 | Lazio (Italy) | 1–0 | (Slovenia) Maribor | Rome, Italy |
| 19:00 CET | Cana (yellow card) 54'; Ederson 62' | Report; Report (in Slovene) | Marcos Tavares (yellow card) 45+1'; Vidović (red card) 76' | Stadium: Olimpico; Attendance: 10,000; Referee: Szymon Marciniak (Poland) |

| 25 October 2012 3 | Maribor (Slovenia) | 1–1 | (England) Tottenham | Maribor, Slovenia |
| 19:00 CET | Berić 42'; Mezga (yellow card) 48' | Report; Report (in Slovene) | Sigurðsson 58'; Naughton (yellow card) 73' | Stadium: Ljudski vrt Attendance: 12,049; Referee: Sergei Karasev (Russia) |

| 8 November 2012 4 | Tottenham (England) | 3–1 | (Slovenia) Maribor | London, England |
| 21:05 CET | Defoe 22', 49', 77'; Bale (yellow card) 53'; Carroll (yellow card) 76' | Report; Report (in Slovene) | Mejač (yellow card) 38'; Berić 40' | Stadium: White Hart Lane; Attendance: 27,089; Referee: Antti Munukka (Finland) |

| 22 November 2012 5 | Panathinaikos (Greece) | 1–0 | (Slovenia) Maribor | Athens, Greece |
| 19:00 CET | Vitolo 67' (pen.) | Report; Report (in Slovene) | Mejač (yellow card) 42' (yellow card) 45' (red card); Mertelj (yellow card) 52'; Arghus (yellow card) 54' | Stadium: OAKA; Attendance: 9,390; Referee: Laurent Duhamel France |

| 6 December 2012 6 | Maribor (Slovenia) | 1–4 | (Italy) Lazio | Maribor, Slovenia |
| 21:05 CET | Filipović (yellow card) 37'; Tavares 84' | Report; Report (in Slovene) | Kozák 16' (yellow card) 22'; Radu 32'; Floccari 38', 51'; Cavanda (yellow card) 65'; Ciani (yellow card) 88' | Stadium: Ljudski vrt Attendance: 11,500; Referee: István Vad (Hungary) |

Colour key: Green = Maribor win; Yellow = draw; Red = opponents win.

| Pos | Team | Pld | W | D | L | GF | GA | GD | Pts | Qualification |
|---|---|---|---|---|---|---|---|---|---|---|
| 1 | (Italy) Lazio | 6 | 3 | 3 | 0 | 9 | 2 | +7 | 12 | Advance to knockout phase |
| 2 | (England) Tottenham Hotspur | 6 | 2 | 4 | 0 | 8 | 4 | +4 | 10 | Advance to knockout phase |
| 3 | (Greece) Panathinaikos | 6 | 1 | 2 | 3 | 4 | 11 | −7 | 5 | |
| 4 | (Slovenia) Maribor | 6 | 1 | 1 | 4 | 6 | 10 | −4 | 4 | |

Source: Soccerway

== Friendlies ==
| 16 June 2012 1 | Jesenice | 0–4 | Maribor | Jesenice, Slovenia |
| 17:30 CET | | Report (in Slovene) | Rep 8'; Tavares 37'; Cvijanović 56'; Črnic 76' | Stadium: Podmežakla Stadium |

| 17 June 2012 2 | Rudar Trbovlje | 1–5 | Maribor | Trbovlje, Slovenia |
| 20:00 CET | Milošević 24' | Report (in Slovene) | Lesjak 21'; Mezga 35' (pen.); Dodlek 54'; Črnic 74'; Velikonja 89' | Stadium: Rudar Stadium |

| 19 June 2012 3 | Maribor (Slovenia) | 6–3 | (Bosnia and Herzegovina) Sarajevo | Rogoza, Slovenia |
| 18:30 CET | Velikonja 14'; Črnic 30'; Tavares 40'; Berić 68'; Kek 71'; Ibraimi 82' | Report (in Slovene) | Husejinović 19'; Karamatić 24'; Čomor 74' (pen.) | Stadium: Sports Park; Attendance: 400; Referee: Silvester Tkalčič (Slovenia) |

| 21 June 2012 4 | Maribor (Slovenia) | 1–0 | (Azerbaijan) Inter Baku | Maribor, Slovenia |
| 19:00 CET | Rep 53' | Report (in Slovene) | | Stadium: Ljudski vrt Attendance: 500; Referee: Tadej Mežnar (Slovenia) |

| 23 June 2012 5 | Mura 05 | 0–0 | Maribor | Odranci, Slovenia |
| 18:15 CET | | Report (in Slovene) | | Stadium: ŠRC Odranci; Referee: Bojan Mertik |

| 24 June 2012 6 | Arsenal Kyiv (Ukraine) | 2–2 | (Slovenia) Maribor | Odranci, Slovenia |
| 18:30 CET | Stargorodskiy 13'; Kobakhidze 43' | Report (in Slovene) | Cvijanović 8' 39' | Stadium: ŠRC Odranci; Referee: Bojan Mertik (Slovenia) |

| 27 June 2012 7 | Illichivets Mariupol (Ukraine) | 2–1 | (Slovenia) Maribor | Serdica (Rogašovci), Slovenia |
| 18:00 CET | Kozhanov 6'; Fedotov 39' | Report (in Slovene) | Tavares 57' |

| 28 June 2012 8 | Tišina | 0–9 | Maribor | Tišina, Slovenia |
| 18:00 CET | | Report (in Slovene) | Moravac 12'; Komazec 26' 31' 59'; Ploj 38' 44' 54'; Vidović 70'; Berić 87' |

| 29 June 2012 9 | Metalist Kharkiv (Ukraine) | 1–0 | (Slovenia) Maribor | Ilz, Austria |
| 18:00 CET | Cristaldo 28' (pen.) | Report (in Slovene) |

| 2 July 2012 10 | Zavrč | 1–1 | Maribor | Zavrč, Slovenia |
| 20:00 CET | A. Čeh 14' | Report (in Slovene) | Komazec 71' | Stadium: Zavrč Sports Park |

| 4 July 2012 11 | Maribor (Slovenia) | 1–1 | (Russia) Lokomotiv Moscow | Maribor, Slovenia |
| 20:00 CET | Tavares 13' | Report (in Slovene) | Glushakov 38' | Stadium: Ljudski vrt Attendance: 700; Referee: Tadej Mežnar (Slovenia) |

| 10 July 2012 12 | Śląsk Wrocław (Poland) | 0–1 | (Slovenia) Maribor | Čakovec, Croatia |
| 18:30 CET | | Report (in Slovene) | Berić 57' |

| 11 September 2012 13 | Veržej | 0–6 | Maribor | Veržej, Slovenia |
| 17:00 CET | | (in Slovene) | Mezga 7' 37'; Cvijanović 43'; Komazec 56'; Črnic 61'; Milec 90' | Stadium: Čistina Stadium |

| 13 October 2012 14 | Cerkvenjak | 1–14 | Maribor | Cerkvenjak, Slovenia |
| 15:00 CET | Zorman 43' | (in Slovene) | Ploj 13'; Komazec 19' 25' 38'; Mezga 21' 36' (pen.); Smrekar 48' 79'; Hotić 51'; Šauperl 55' 56'; Milec 68'; Rep 83'; Arghus 88' | Stadium: Sports and Recreation Center; Attendance: 1,000 |

| 22 January 2013 15 | Maribor (Slovenia) | 1–1 | (Austria) Mattersburg | Stegersbach, Austria |
| 14:30 CET | Smrekar 70' | Report (in Slovene) | Klemen 41' | Referee: Grlec (Slovenia) |

| 26 January 2013 16 | Maribor (Slovenia) | 2–1 | (Hungary) Pécsi | Lendava, Slovenia |
| 14:30 CET | Ibraimi (pen.), 5'; Berić 27' | Report (in Slovene) | Wittredi (pen.), 77' | Referee: Grlic (Slovenia) |

| 29 January 2013 17 | Maribor | 10–0 | Odranci | Lendava, Slovenia |
| | Filipović 20'; Tavares 25'; Mertelj 28'; Smrekar 32'; Moravac 44'; Milec 45'; Berić 53'; Mevlja 59'; Fajić 79'; Hozjan (og.), 81' | Report (in Slovene) | | Referee: Tratnjek |

| 31 January 2013 18 | Maribor (Slovenia) | 3–1 | (Hungary) Kaposvári | Moravske Toplice, Slovenia |
| | Ibraimi (pen.), 20'; Tavares 50' 70' | Report (in Slovene) | Haruna 73' | Referee: Grilc (Slovenia) |

| 5 February 2013 19 | Maribor (Slovenia) | 0–2 | (Austria) Admira Wacker | Belek, Turkey |
| 14:00 CET | | Report (in Slovene) | Mikuš 14'; Ouédraogo 85' | Stadium: Susesi Sport Center |

| 9 February 2013 20 | Maribor (Slovenia) | 3–1 | (Romania) Petrolul Ploiești | Belek, Turkey |
| 10:00 CET | Mezga (pen.), 62' 68'; Smrekar 72' | Report (in Slovene) | Bokila 69' | Stadium: Susesi Sport Center |

| 10 February 2013 21 | Maribor (Slovenia) | 0–0 | (China) Jiangsu | Belek, Turkey |
| 14:00 CET | | Report (in Slovene) | | Stadium: Susesi Sport Center |

| 12 February 2013 22 | Maribor (Slovenia) | 0–1 | (Bulgaria) Litex Lovech | Belek, Turkey |
| 14:00 CET | | Report (in Slovene) | Milanov (pen.), 61' | Stadium: Susesi Sport Center |

| 13 February 2013 23 | Maribor (Slovenia) | 2–0 | (Ukraine) Karpaty Lviv | Belek, Turkey |
| 16:30 CET | Mezga 52'; Berić 75' | Report (in Slovene) | | Stadium: Susesi Sport Center |

| 15 February 2013 24 | Maribor (Slovenia) | 3–2 | (Czech Republic) Baumit Jablonec | Belek, Turkey |
| 14:00 CET | Cvijanović 50'; Berić 82'; Potokar 90' | Report (in Slovene) | Rossi Silva 8'; Třešňák 72' | Stadium: Susesi Sport Center |

| 20 March 2013 25 | Maribor | 6–1 | Maribor Academy | Maribor, Slovenia |
| | Smrekar 8'; Fajić 12'; Tavares 35'; Lesjak 84'; Berić 85' 90' | Report (in Slovene) | Konjić 74' | Stadium: Ljudski vrt (training pitch) |

Colour key: Green = Maribor win; Yellow = draw; Red = opponents win.

== Squad statistics ==
=== Key ===
Players

- No. = Shirt number
- Pos. = Playing position
- GK = Goalkeeper
- DF = Defender
- MF = Midfielder
- FW = Forward

Nationality

- = Bosnia and Herzegovina
- = Brazil
- = Croatia
- (North Macedonia) = Macedonia
- = Serbia
- = Slovenia

Competitions

- Apps = Appearances
- = Yellow card
- (red card) = Red card

Key
| † | The player was selected in the official 2012–13 Slovenian PrvaLiga team of the season and was chosen as the league's MVP |
| ‡ | The player was selected in the official 2012–13 Slovenian PrvaLiga team of the season |
| # | The player was the top scorer in the respective competition |

=== Appearances and goals ===
Correct as of 29 May 2013, end of the 2012–13 season. Flags indicate national team as has been defined under FIFA eligibility rules. Players may hold more than one non-FIFA nationality. The players squad numbers, playing positions, nationalities and statistics are based solely on match reports in Matches sections above and the official website of NK Maribor and the Slovenian PrvaLiga. Only the players, which made at least one appearance for the first team, are listed.

List of Maribor players, who represented the team during the 2012–13 season, and displaying their statistics during that timeframe
| No. | Pos. | Name | Apps | Goals | Apps | Goals | Apps | Goals | Apps | Goals | Apps | Goals | Apps | Goals |
| No. | Pos. | Name | League | | Cup | | Supercup | | Champions League | | Europa League | | Total | |
|---|---|---|---|---|---|---|---|---|---|---|---|---|---|---|
| 4 | DF | (Slovenia) Jovan Vidović | 9 | 2 | 1 | 0 | — | — | — | — | 2 | 0 | 12 | 2 |
| 5 | MF | (Slovenia) Željko Filipović | 26 | 0 | 6 | 0 | 1 | 1 # | 6 | 0 | 6 | 0 | 45 | 1 |
| 6 | DF | (Slovenia) Martin Milec ‡ | 25 | 2 | 5 | 0 | — | — | 1 | 0 | 5 | 0 | 36 | 2 |
| 7 | DF | (Slovenia) Aleš Mejač ‡ | 18 | 1 | 2 | 0 | 1 | 0 | 6 | 0 | 5 | 0 | 32 | 1 |
| 8 | MF | (Croatia) Dejan Mezga^{[C]} | 28 | 7 | 6 | 4 # | 1 | 0 | 6 | 3 | 5 | 0 | 46 | 14 |
| 9 | FW | (Brazil) Marcos Tavares ‡ | 29 | 17 # | 6 | 4 # | 1 | 0 | 6 | 3 | 6 | 2 | 48 | 26 |
| 10 | MF | (North Macedonia) Agim Ibraimi † | 25 | 6 | 6 | 1 | 1 | 1 # | 6 | 1 | 6 | 1 | 44 | 10 |
| 11 | FW | (Slovenia) Etien Velikonja | 2 | 0 | — | — | 1 | 0 | 1 | 0 | — | — | 4 | 0 |
| 11 | FW | (Slovenia) Luka Zahovič | 1 | 0 | — | — | — | — | — | — | — | — | 1 | 0 |
| 12 | GK | (Slovenia) Marko Pridigar | 3 | 0 | — | — | — | — | — | — | — | — | 3 | 0 |
| 14 | FW | (Slovenia) Bian Paul Šauperl | 1 | 0 | — | — | — | — | — | — | — | — | 1 | 0 |
| 17 | FW | (Croatia) Matija Smrekar | 10 | 0 | 4 | 0 | — | — | — | — | — | — | 14 | 0 |
| 20 | MF | (Slovenia) Goran Cvijanović ‡ | 32 | 12 | 6 | 0 | 1 | 0 | 6 | 0 | 6 | 0 | 51 | 12 |
| 21 | FW | (Serbia) Nikola Komazec | 13 | 3 | 1 | 0 | — | — | 4 | 0 | 3 | 0 | 21 | 3 |
| 22 | DF | (Slovenia) Nejc Potokar | 23 | 0 | 4 | 0 | 1 | 0 | 4 | 0 | 3 | 0 | 35 | 0 |
| 23 | MF | (Slovenia) Dino Hotić | 3 | 0 | — | — | — | — | — | — | — | — | 3 | 0 |
| 24 | DF | (Slovenia) Dejan Trajkovski | 11 | 0 | — | — | 1 | 0 | 3 | 0 | 1 | 0 | 16 | 0 |
| 25 | MF | (Serbia) Ranko Moravac | 4 | 0 | — | — | — | — | — | — | — | — | 4 | 0 |
| 26 | DF | (Slovenia) Aleksander Rajčević ‡ | 23 | 1 | 3 | 1 | 1 | 0 | 6 | 0 | 6 | 0 | 39 | 2 |
| 27 | FW | (Slovenia) Alen Ploj | 14 | 6 | — | — | — | — | — | — | — | — | 14 | 6 |
| 28 | DF | (Slovenia) Mitja Viler | 21 | 0 | 5 | 0 | — | — | — | — | 1 | 0 | 27 | 0 |
| 29 | MF | (Slovenia) Timotej Dodlek | 19 | 0 | 2 | 0 | — | — | 1 | 0 | 4 | 0 | 26 | 0 |
| 30 | MF | (Slovenia) Petar Stojanović | 2 | 0 | — | — | — | — | — | — | — | — | 2 | 0 |
| 31 | MF | (Croatia) Zoran Lesjak | 6 | 0 | — | — | — | — | 2 | 0 | — | — | 8 | 0 |
| 32 | FW | (Slovenia) Robert Berić | 33 | 13 | 5 | 1 | 1 | 0 | 6 | 3 | 6 | 3 | 51 | 20 |
| 33 | GK | (Slovenia) Jasmin Handanović | 33 | 0 | 6 | 0 | 1 | 0 | 6 | 0 | 6 | 0 | 52 | 0 |
| 35 | DF | (Slovenia) Mitja Rešek | 1 | 0 | — | — | — | — | — | — | — | — | 1 | 0 |
| 44 | DF | (Brazil) Arghus^{[D]} | 14 | 1 | 3 | 0 | — | — | 6 | 0 | 4 | 0 | 27 | 1 |
| 45 | DF | (Slovenia) Nejc Mevlja | 11 | 0 | 2 | 0 | — | — | — | — | — | — | 13 | 0 |
| 55 | FW | (Slovenia) Rajko Rep | 4 | 0 | — | — | 1 | 0 | — | — | — | — | 5 | 0 |
| 70 | MF | (Slovenia) Aleš Mertelj | 27 | 1 | 6 | 0 | 1 | 0 | 6 | 1 | 6 | 0 | 46 | 2 |
| 71 | FW | (Bosnia and Herzegovina) Nusmir Fajić | 8 | 4 | — | — | — | — | — | — | — | — | 8 | 4 |
| 92 | MF | (Slovenia) Matic Črnic | 12 | 1 | — | — | — | — | — | — | 1 | 0 | 13 | 1 |

=== Discipline ===
Correct as of 29 May 2013, end of the 2012–13 season. Flags indicate national team as has been defined under FIFA eligibility rules. Players may hold more than one non-FIFA nationality. The players squad numbers, playing positions, nationalities and statistics are based solely on match reports in Matches sections above and the official website of NK Maribor and the Slovenian PrvaLiga. If a player received two yellow cards in a match and was subsequently sent off the numbers count as two yellow cards, one red card.

List of Maribor players, who represented the team during the 2012–13 season, and displaying their statistics during that timeframe
| No. | Pos. | Name | Booked | Sent off (straight red) | Booked | Sent off (straight red) | Booked | Sent off (straight red) | Booked | Sent off (straight red) | Booked | Sent off (straight red) | Booked | Sent off (straight red) |
| No. | Pos. | Name | League | | Cup | | Supercup | | Champions League | | Europa League | | Total | |
|---|---|---|---|---|---|---|---|---|---|---|---|---|---|---|
| 4 | DF | (Slovenia) Jovan Vidović | 0 | 0 | 0 | 0 | — | — | 0 | 0 | 0 | 1 | 0 | 1 |
| 5 | MF | (Slovenia) Željko Filipović | 7 | 0 | 1 | 0 | 0 | 0 | 0 | 0 | 1 | 0 | 9 | 0 |
| 6 | DF | (Slovenia) Martin Milec ‡ | 5 | 0 | 1 | 0 | — | — | 0 | 0 | 0 | 0 | 6 | 0 |
| 7 | DF | (Slovenia) Aleš Mejač ‡ | 2 | 0 | 1 | 0 | 0 | 0 | 0 | 0 | 3 | 1 | 6 | 1 |
| 8 | MF | (Croatia) Dejan Mezga^{[C]} | 3 | 0 | 1 | 0 | 0 | 0 | 1 | 0 | 1 | 0 | 6 | 0 |
| 9 | FW | (Brazil) Marcos Tavares ‡ | 3 | 0 | 1 | 0 | 0 | 0 | 0 | 0 | 1 | 0 | 5 | 0 |
| 10 | MF | (North Macedonia) Agim Ibraimi † | 1 | 1 | 1 | 0 | 0 | 0 | 0 | 0 | 1 | 0 | 3 | 1 |
| 11 | FW | (Slovenia) Etien Velikonja | 0 | 0 | — | — | 0 | 0 | 0 | 0 | — | — | 0 | 0 |
| 11 | FW | (Slovenia) Luka Zahovič | 0 | 0 | — | — | — | — | — | — | — | — | 0 | 0 |
| 12 | GK | (Slovenia) Marko Pridigar | 0 | 0 | — | — | — | — | — | — | — | — | 0 | 0 |
| 14 | FW | (Slovenia) Bian Paul Šauperl | 0 | 0 | — | — | — | — | — | — | — | — | 0 | 0 |
| 17 | FW | (Croatia) Matija Smrekar | 1 | 0 | 0 | 0 | — | — | — | — | — | — | 1 | 0 |
| 20 | MF | (Slovenia) Goran Cvijanović | 0 | 0 | 0 | 0 | 0 | 0 | 0 | 0 | 0 | 0 | 0 | 0 |
| 21 | FW | (Serbia) Nikola Komazec | 3 | 1 | 0 | 0 | — | — | 0 | 0 | 0 | 0 | 3 | 1 |
| 22 | DF | (Slovenia) Nejc Potokar | 6 | 1 | 1 | 0 | 0 | 0 | 2 | 0 | 0 | 0 | 9 | 1 |
| 23 | MF | (Slovenia) Dino Hotić | 1 | 0 | — | — | — | — | — | — | — | — | 1 | 0 |
| 24 | DF | (Slovenia) Dejan Trajkovski | 2 | 0 | — | — | 0 | 0 | 0 | 0 | — | — | 2 | 0 |
| 25 | MF | (Serbia) Ranko Moravac | 0 | 0 | — | — | — | — | — | — | — | — | 0 | 0 |
| 26 | DF | (Slovenia) Aleksander Rajčević ‡ | 5 | 0 | 0 | 0 | 0 | 0 | 2 | 0 | 0 | 0 | 7 | 0 |
| 27 | FW | (Slovenia) Alen Ploj | 1 | 0 | — | — | — | — | — | — | — | — | 1 | 0 |
| 28 | DF | (Slovenia) Mitja Viler | 1 | 0 | 1 | 0 | — | — | — | — | 0 | 0 | 2 | 0 |
| 31 | MF | (Croatia) Zoran Lesjak | 2 | 0 | — | — | — | — | 0 | 0 | — | — | 2 | 0 |
| 32 | FW | (Slovenia) Robert Berić | 4 | 0 | 0 | 0 | 0 | 0 | 0 | 0 | 1 | 0 | 5 | 0 |
| 33 | GK | (Slovenia) Jasmin Handanović | 3 | 1 | 0 | 0 | 0 | 0 | 1 | 0 | 0 | 0 | 4 | 1 |
| 44 | DF | (Brazil) Arghus^{[D]} | 3 | 2 | — | — | — | — | 0 | 1 | 1 | 0 | 4 | 3 |
| 45 | DF | (Slovenia) Nejc Mevlja | 0 | 0 | 0 | 0 | — | — | — | — | — | — | 0 | 0 |
| 55 | FW | (Slovenia) Rajko Rep | 0 | 0 | — | — | 0 | 0 | — | — | — | — | 0 | 0 |
| 70 | MF | (Slovenia) Aleš Mertelj | 3 | 0 | 1 | 0 | 2 | 1 | 1 | 0 | 1 | 0 | 8 | 1 |
| 71 | FW | (Bosnia and Herzegovina) Nusmir Fajić | 3 | 0 | — | — | — | — | — | — | — | — | 3 | 0 |
| 92 | MF | (Slovenia) Matic Črnic | 0 | 0 | — | — | — | — | — | — | 0 | 0 | 0 | 0 |

== Transfers and loans ==
=== Summer transfer window ===
| Transfer | Position | Name | From / last | To | Note |
|---|---|---|---|---|---|
| Loan out | DF | (Slovenia) Aleš Majer | Maribor | Mura 05 | Loaned out until 1 June 2013 |
| Transfer in | FW | (Serbia) Nikola Komazec | Petrolul Ploiești | Maribor | Free agent |
| Transfer out | MF | (Brazil) Gabriel | Maribor | Valletta | Free agent |
| Transfer out | FW | (Slovenia) Etien Velikonja | Maribor | Cardiff City | Undisclosed transfer fee, alleged to be around €2 million |
| Loan out | DF | (Slovenia) Mitja Rešek | Maribor | Aluminij | Loaned out until 1 June 2013 |
| Transfer out | DF | (Slovenia) Dejan Kurbus | Maribor | Mura 05 | Free transfer |
| Transfer out | MF | (Slovenia) Aleks Pihler | Maribor | Domžale | Free transfer |
| Loan out | DF | (Slovenia) Matjaž Kek | Maribor | Šenčur | Loaned out until January 2013 |
| Loan out | GK | (Slovenia) Dragan Topić | Maribor | Šenčur | Loaned out |
| Transfer in | DF | (Slovenia) Nejc Mevlja | Gorica | Maribor | Free transfer |

=== Winter transfer window ===
| Transfer | Position | Name | From / last | To | Note |
|---|---|---|---|---|---|
| Transfer in | FW | (Bosnia and Herzegovina) Nusmir Fajić | Mura 05 | Maribor | Undisclosed transfer fee, alleged to be around €30,000 |
| Transfer in | FW | (Croatia) Matija Smrekar | Charleroi | Maribor | Free agent |
| Loan out | MF | (Slovenia) Matic Črnic | Maribor | Aluminij | Loaned out until June 2013 |
| Loan out | DF | (Slovenia) Matjaž Kek | Maribor | Dravinja | Loaned out until June 2013 |
| Loan out | FW | (Slovenia) Alen Ploj | Maribor | Mura 05 | Loaned out until June 2013 |
| Loan out | MF | (Slovenia) Rajko Rep | Maribor | Mura 05 | Loaned out until June 2013 |
| Loan out | GK | (Slovenia) Matej Radan | Maribor | Dravinja | Loaned out until June 2013 |
| Transfer out | FW | (Serbia) Nikola Komazec | Maribor | Suphanburi | Transferred out |

== Footnotes ==
- ^{A} Knockout matches which were decided on penalty kicks are listed as a draw.
- ^{B} Olimpija was officially selected as the home team during the 2012 Slovenian Supercup, with a draw. The Slovenian Supercup is, however, traditionally played at the stadium of the previous year league champions and the 2012 final was played at the Ljudski vrt stadium in Maribor, the home of NK Maribor. Thus, the match is listed as being played at home.
- ^{C} Mezga holds a dual citizenship of Croatia and Slovenia.
- ^{D} Arghus holds a dual citizenship of Brazil and Italy.

== See also ==
- List of NK Maribor seasons
