= 2013–14 Slovenian Football Cup =

Tournament details
- Country: Slovenia
- Teams: 27

Final positions
- Champions: Gorica (3rd title)
- Runners-up: Maribor

Tournament statistics
- Matches played: 32
- Goals scored: 118 (3.69 per match)
- Attendance: 24,610 (769 per match)
- Top goal scorer(s): Elvis Bratanović; Mate Eterović; Dino Kresinger; Matej Podlogar (4 goals each)

The 2013–14 Slovenian Football Cup was the 23rd season of the Slovenian Football Cup, Slovenia's football knockout competition.

== Qualified clubs ==
=== 2012–13 Slovenian PrvaLiga members ===
- Aluminij
- Celje
- Domžale
- Gorica
- Koper
- Maribor
- Olimpija
- Rudar Velenje
- Triglav Kranj
- Mura 05 (did not enter, dissolved following the 2012–13 season)

=== Qualified through MNZ Regional Cups ===
- MNZ Ljubljana: Krka, Radomlje
- MNZ Maribor: Dravograd, Dobrovce
- MNZ Celje: Šmartno 1928, Dravinja
- MNZ Koper: Jadran Dekani, Ankaran
- MNZ Nova Gorica: Tolmin, Brda
- MNZ Murska Sobota: Slatina, Veržej
- MNZ Lendava: Odranci, Turnišče
- MNZG-Kranj: Šenčur, Bled
- MNZ Ptuj: Drava Ptuj, Zavrč

== First round ==
Maribor, Celje, Olimpija, Domžale and Drava Ptuj joined the competition in the second round (round of 16).

20 August 2013	Slatina	0–2	Gorica	Radenci
16:00 CEST		Report	Vanzo 63'; Danilevičius 80'	Stadium: ŠRC Slatina; Attendance: 350; Referee: Darjan Kovačič

21 August 2013	Bled	0–8	Zavrč	Bled
16:00 CEST		Report	Dugolin 2'; Kresinger 41', 50', 62', 80'; Fuček 71', 90+1' (pen.); Kokol 88'	Stadium: Bled Sports Centre; Attendance: 200; Referee: Dejan Balažič

21 August 2013	Turnišče	0–7	Aluminij	Turnišče
16:00 CEST		Report	Kurež 6', 13', 58'; Bloudek 26'; Horvat 34'; Lonzarić 49'; Pečovnik 65'	Stadium: Turnišče Stadium; Attendance: 150; Referee: Tadej Mežnar

21 August 2013	Krka	3–0	Koper	Novo Mesto
16:00 CEST	Marošević 5', 77'; Košnik 13'	Report		Stadium: Portoval; Attendance: 250; Referee: Darko Čeferin

21 August 2013	Dravograd	2–1	Tolmin	Dravograd
16:00 CEST	Stefanović 15'; Gluhovič 36' (pen.)	Report	Zornik 8'	Stadium: Dravograd Sports Centre; Attendance: 150; Referee: Štefan Fekonja

21 August 2013	Jadran Dekani	2–3	Šenčur	Dekani
16:00 CEST	Stepančič 35'; Bržan 73'	Report	Dolžan 5'; Kotnik 11'; Nunić 57'	Stadium: Dekani Sports Park; Attendance: 100; Referee: Davor Drečnik

21 August 2013	Dravinja	1–3	Radomlje	Slovenske Konjice
16:00 CEST	Štante 72'	Report	Snoj 6' (pen.); Zukić 14'; Hren 25' (o.g.)	Stadium: Dobrava Stadium; Attendance: 50; Referee: Roberto Ponis

21 August 2013	Odranci	0–2	Šmartno 1928	Odranci
16:00 CEST		Report	Vindiš 64'; Kolenc 82'	Stadium: ŠRC Odranci; Attendance: 200; Referee: Roman Glažar

21 August 2013	Veržej	4–2	Triglav Kranj	Veržej
16:00 CEST	Mauko 9'; Karnet 15' (pen.); Ropoša 76'; Slana 90'	Report	Nukić 44', 60'	Stadium: Čistina Stadium; Attendance: 250; Referee: Rade Obrenović

21 August 2013	Dobrovce	0–9	Rudar Velenje	Dobrovce
16:00 CEST		Report	Eterović 13', 21'; Bratanović 30'; Firer 52', 86'; Črnčič 64'; Kašnik 76'; Krefl 84'; Podlogar 88'	Stadium: Dobrovce Sports Park; Attendance: 400; Referee: Andrej Žnidaršič

21 August 2013	Brda	1–2 (a.e.t.)	Ankaran	Vipolže
16:00 CEST	Džuzdanović 116' (pen.)	Report	Valenčič 92'; Šahinović 110'	Stadium: Vipolže Stadium; Attendance: 80; Referee: Asmir Sagrković

== Round of 16 ==
18 September 2013	Dravograd	0–4	Gorica	Dravograd
16:00 CEST		Report	Vuković 8' (o.g.); Danilevičius 19'; Bazzoffia 31'; Nabernik 80' (o.g.)	Stadium: Dravograd Sports Centre; Attendance: 300; Referee: Vojko Goričan

18 September 2013	Šenčur	2–1	Veržej	Šenčur
17:00 CEST	Kotnik 32'; Pavlin 89'	Report	Vinkovič 40'	Stadium: Sports Park; Attendance: 150; Referee: Roman Glažar

18 September 2013	Ankaran	0–5	Olimpija	Ankaran
16:00 CEST		Report	Nikezić 22', 73'; Šporar 65', 78'; Vukćević 84'	Stadium: ŠRC Katarina; Attendance: 200; Referee: Andrej Žnidaršič

18 September 2013	Drava Ptuj	0–4	Domžale	Ptuj
16:00 CEST		Report	Vuk 2', 55'; Parker 15'; Kous 45'	Stadium: City Stadium; Attendance: 300; Referee: Miran Bukovec

18 September 2013	Celje	4–0	Zavrč	Celje
17:00 CEST	Jugović 18'; Gobec 70'; Čadikovski 39'; Žurej 41'	Report		Stadium: Arena Petrol; Attendance: 500; Referee: Davor Drečnik

18 September 2013	Šmartno 1928	1–2	Aluminij	Šmartno ob Paki
16:00 CEST	Kolenc 35'	Report	Vaš 4'; Bingo 26'	Stadium: Šmartno Stadium; Attendance: 120; Referee: Bojan Mertik

18 September 2013	Rudar Velenje	4–0	Krka	Velenje
17:00 CEST	Bratanović 21', 64'; Podlogar 69'; Rotman 76'	Report		Stadium: Ob Jezeru; Attendance: 300; Referee: Dejan Balažič

30 October 2013	Radomlje	1–4	Maribor	Domžale
18:00 CET	Zavrl 54'	Report	Cvijanović 29'; Mendy 70', 87', 90'	Stadium: Sports Park; Attendance: 1,500; Referee: Nejc Kajtazović

Notes

1. The match between Radomlje and Maribor was postponed and rescheduled to a later date, as Maribor played their first match of the 2013–14 UEFA Europa League on 19 September 2013.

== Quarter-finals ==
=== First leg ===
23 October 2013	Rudar Velenje	4–0	Celje	Velenje
17:00 CEST	Bratanović 24'; Eterović 42', 49'; Rotman 86'	Report		Stadium: Ob Jezeru; Attendance: 500; Referee: Davor Drečnik

23 October 2013	Aluminij	0–1	Gorica	Kidričevo
15:00 CEST		Report	Danilevičius 57'	Stadium: Sports Park; Attendance: 100; Referee: Andrej Žnidaršič

23 October 2013	Olimpija	2–0	Domžale	Ljubljana
17:00 CEST	Baskera 22'; Šporar 37' (pen.)	Report		Stadium: Stožice; Attendance: 500; Referee: Roberto Ponis

13 November 2013	Šenčur	2–5	Maribor	Šenčur
18:00 CET	Pavlin 70' (pen.); Nunić 87'	Report	Milec 20' (pen.), 30'; Mezga 56'; Stojanović 67'; Fajić 89'	Stadium: Sports Park; Attendance: 800; Referee: Sašo Habjanič

=== Second leg ===
30 October 2013	Gorica	3–1 (4–1 agg.)	Aluminij	Nova Gorica
18:00 CET	N'Diaye 8'; Lapadula 28', 45'	Report	Jovanović 20'	Stadium: Sports Park; Attendance: 250; Referee: Asmir Sagrković

30 October 2013	Celje	1–3 (1–7 agg.)	Rudar Velenje	Celje
16:30 CET	Zajc 56'	Report	Radujko 71', 89'; Rotman 75'	Stadium: Arena Petrol; Attendance: 250; Referee: Darko Čeferin

6 November 2013	Domžale	1–0 (1–2 agg.)	Olimpija	Domžale
17:30 CET	Husmani 51'	Report		Stadium: Sports Park; Attendance: 600; Referee: Dejan Balažič

4 December 2013	Maribor	1–1 (6–3 agg.)	Šenčur	Maribor
17:00 CET	Zahovič 35'	Report	Dolžan 54'	Stadium: Ljudski vrt Attendance: 700; Referee: Mitja Žganec

Notes

2. The quarter-final matches between Šenčur and Maribor were postponed and rescheduled to a later date, as during the original first and second leg schedule (e.g. 23 October 2013 and 30 October 2013) the opponent of Šenčur was not established, as Maribor played their Round of 16 match against Radomlje on 30 October 2013.
3. The second leg match of the quarter-final between Domžale and Olimpija was originally scheduled on 30 October 2013. However, because Domžale Sports Park, the home of Domžale, hosted a Round of 16 match between Radomlje and Maribor on the same day, the second leg quarter-final match between Domžale and Olimpija was postponed to 6 November 2013.

== Semi-finals ==
=== First leg ===
26 March 2014	Rudar Velenje	0–1	Gorica	Velenje
18:00 CET		Report	Misuraca 90+2'	Stadium: Ob Jezeru; Attendance: 500; Referee: Davor Drečnik

26 March 2014	Maribor	1–0	Olimpija	Maribor
20:05 CET	Cvijanović 23'	Report		Stadium: Ljudski vrt Attendance: 7,000; Referee: Dragoslav Perić

=== Second leg ===
2 April 2014	Gorica	2–1 (3–1 agg.)	Rudar Velenje	Nova Gorica
15:00 CEST	Lapadula 29'; Misuraca 86' (pen.)	Report	Podlogar 62'	Stadium: Sports Park; Attendance: 360; Referee: Bojan Mertik

2 April 2014	Olimpija	1–1 (1–2 agg.)	Maribor	Ljubljana
17:30 CEST	Šuler 45' (o.g.)	Report	Fajić 54'	Stadium: Stožice; Attendance: 4,000; Referee: Matej Jug

== Final ==
21 May 2014
20:30 CEST

Maribor	0–2	Gorica
	Report	Finocchio 78', 85'

Bonifika, Koper
Attendance: 3,500
Referee: Damir Skomina
