= Kokol =

Kokol is a Slovene surname. Notable people with the surname include:

- Miha Kokol (born 1989), Slovene footballer
- Vladimir Kokol (born 1972), Slovene footballer
