= David Zink =

Austrian footballer

Personal information
- Date of birth: 13 November 1991 (age 34)
- Position: Midfielder

Team information
- Current team: SC Kalsdorf
- Number: 34

Youth career
- 1998–2007: SU Naintsch

Senior career*
Years	Team	Apps	(Gls)
2007–2008	SU Naintsch		
2008–2015	SV Anger	84	(6)
2015–2016	USV Allerheiligen	29	(4)
2016–2018	TSV Hartberg	35	(9)
2018–2019	SC Kalsdorf	3	(2)
2019	SV Krottendorf		
2019–	SC Kalsdorf	3	(0)
- * Club domestic league appearances and goals as of 11 October 2019

David Zink (born 13 November 1991) is an Austrian football player. He plays for SC Kalsdorf in Austrian Regionalliga.

== Club career ==
He made his Austrian Football First League debut for TSV Hartberg on 28 July 2017 in a game against Floridsdorfer AC.
