= Doris Kelenc =

Slovenian footballer

Personal information
- Full name: Doris Kelenc
- Date of birth: 8 February 1986 (age 40)
- Place of birth: Ptuj, SFR Yugoslavia
- Height: 1.79 m (5 ft 10 in)
- Position: Midfielder

Team information
- Current team: SV Strass
- Number: 7

Youth career
- –2005: Aluminij

Senior career*
Years	Team	Apps	(Gls)
2003–2005	Aluminij	48	(14)
2005–2010	Drava Ptuj	155	(15)
2010–2011	Rudar Velenje	19	(2)
2011–2012	Koper	8	(0)
2012–2015	Zavrč	89	(21)
2015–2018	USV Allerheiligen	88	(24)
2018–2020	SV Wildon	51	(10)
2021–2022	SV Gralla	25	(3)
2022–	SV Strass	37	(6)

International career
2006	Slovenia U20	4	(0)
2006–2008	Slovenia U21	6	(0)
- * Club domestic league appearances and goals as of 10 November 2023

Doris Kelenc (born 8 February 1986) is a Slovenian football midfielder who plays for Austrian side SV Strass. He had also played for USV Allerheiligen.
