= Sandi Čeh =

Slovenian footballer

Personal information
- Full name: Sandi Čeh
- Date of birth: 6 April 1983 (age 43)
- Place of birth: Ptuj, SFR Yugoslavia
- Position: Left-back

Team information
- Current team: USV Deutsch Goritz
- Number: 13

Youth career
- Aluminij

Senior career*
Years	Team	Apps	(Gls)
2002–2007	Aluminij	88	(5)
2002–2004	→ Stojnci (loan)	26	(9)
2007–2008	Zavrč	24	(2)
2012–2014	Zavrč	55	(2)
2015–2016	Aluminij	32	(1)
2016–	USV Deutsch Goritz	143	(13)
- * Club domestic league appearances and goals as of 18 August 2023

Sandi Čeh (born 6 April 1983) is a Slovenian football defender who plays for USV Deutsch Goritz.
