= Jože Benko =

Slovenian footballer

Personal information
- Date of birth: 23 March 1980 (age 46)
- Place of birth: Murska Sobota, SFR Yugoslavia
- Height: 1.83 m (6 ft 0 in)
- Position: Striker

Youth career
- Mura
- Križevci

Senior career*
Years	Team	Apps	(Gls)
1998–2003	Mura	21	(1)
2001	→ Beltinci (loan)	11	(3)
2002	→ Dravograd (loan)	7	(1)
2003–2004	Križevci	26	(16)
2004–2007	Nafta Lendava	72	(29)
2007–2008	Iraklis	5	(0)
2008–2009	Domžale	43	(18)
2009–2010	AEK Larnaca	11	(3)
2010	→ Nafta Lendava (loan)	13	(3)
2010–2011	Nafta Lendava	18	(11)
2011–2012	Wuhan Zall	3	(0)
2012	Lombard Pápa	15	(2)
2013–2014	Zavrč	27	(16)
2014–2016	Jennersdorf	65	(36)
2016	Minihof/Liebau	11	(13)

International career
1998	Slovenia U18	2	(0)
2000	Slovenia U20	1	(0)
- * Club domestic league appearances and goals as of 26 September 2016

Jože Benko (born 23 March 1980) is a Slovenian retired football striker who last played for Austrian side Minihof/Liebau.

== Club career ==
During his career he has played for top clubs from Prekmurje, Mura and Nafta Lendava. He has also played for Domžale in the Slovenian league.
