= Dominik Božak =

Croatian footballer

Personal information
- Full name: Dominik Božak
- Date of birth: 30 April 1991 (age 35)
- Place of birth: Varaždin, SFR Yugoslavia
- Position: Forward

Team information
- Current team: Bednja

Senior career*
Years	Team	Apps	(Gls)
2010–2011	SK Unterschützen	25	(14)
2011–2013	Ivančica		
2013–2014	Videm		
2014	Zavrč	2	(0)
2014–2015	Videm	14	(17)
2016–2017	UFC Markt Allhau	4	(3)
2017–2018	Videm	46	(31)
2019–2021	Ivančica		
2021-	Bednja		
- * Club domestic league appearances and goals as of 26 June 2019

Dominik Božak (born 30 April 1991) is a Croatian football forward who plays for Bednja.

== Club career ==
He has two different spells in the Austrian lower leagues with SK Unterschützen and UFC Markt Allhau.
