= Josip Golubar =

Croatian footballer

Personal information
- Full name: Josip Golubar
- Date of birth: 4 March 1985 (age 41)
- Place of birth: Krkanec, SFR Yugoslavia
- Height: 1.87 m (6 ft 2 in)
- Position: Midfielder

Team information
- Current team: Podravina

Youth career
- Varteks

Senior career*
| Years | Team | Apps | (Gls) |
| –2005 | Nedeljanec | | |
| 2005–2006 | Sankt Michael | | |
| 2008 | Neuberg | 10 | (1) |
| 2008–2009 | Stegersbach | 15 | (5) |
| 2009–2012 | Varaždin | 66 | (5) |
| 2012 | RNK Split | 11 | (0) |
| 2012–2014 | Zavrč | 56 | (18) |
| 2014–2015 | Olimpija Ljubljana | 8 | (0) |
| 2015–2016 | Zavrč | 17 | (4) |
| 2016–2017 | Varaždin | 17 | (9) |
| 2017 | Lučko | 7 | (2) |
| 2017–2019 | Varaždin | 41 | (7) |
| 2019 | Valour FC | 3 | (0) |
| 2020 | SV Neuberg | 1 | (0) |
| 2020– | Varteks | | |
| 2021- | Podravina | | |
- * Club domestic league appearances and goals as of 19:27, 6 October 2020 (UTC)

Josip Golubar (born 4 March 1985) is a Croatian footballer who plays as a midfielder for NK Podravina.

== Career ==
=== Early career ===
Golubar played at youth level with hometown club Varteks (later renamed Varaždin). He spent much of his early senior career in the Austrian Landesliga.

=== Stegersbach ===
In 2008, Golubar signed with Austrian Regionalliga club SV Stegersbach. He made 15 appearances that season, scoring five goals.

=== Varaždin ===
In 2009, Golubar returned to Croatia and signed with First League side Varaždin, near his home town.

On 14 July 2011, Golubar made his European debut in the Europa League second qualifying round against Moldovan side Iskra-Stal. He went on to make four Europa League appearances that season, scoring one goal.

=== RNK Split ===
In winter 2012, Golubar signed with RNK Split.

=== Zavrč ===
In the summer 2012, Golubar signed with Slovenian Second League side Zavrč. In his first season in Slovenia, he made 24 appearances and scored 13 goals, tying Amer Krcić for top scorer in the league. Zavrč won the league that season and earned promotion to the PrvaLiga.

In the 2013–14 PrvaLiga, Golubar made 32 appearances for Zavrč, scoring five goals, and helping the club to a fifth-place finish, missing out on a Europa League spot by five points.

=== Olimpija Ljubljana ===
In the summer 2014, Golubar signed with Olimpija Ljubljana. He would make a total of thirteen league appearances for Olimpija before leaving the club in September 2015.

=== Second spell at Zavrč ===
Shortly after leaving Olimpija, Golubar returned to Zavrč for a second spell, making 17 league appearances and scoring four goals that season.

=== Second spell at Varaždin ===
In summer 2015, Golubar returned to Croatia and signed with Varaždin for a second spell, this time in the Third League.

=== Lučko ===
Midway through the 2016–17 season, Golubar left Varaždin to sign with Croatian Second League club Lučko. Over the remainder of the season, he made seven league appearances and scored two goals.

=== Third spell at Varaždin ===
After Varaždin earned promotion to the Croatian Second League, Golubar re-signed again on 6 July 2017. In the 2017–18 season he made 29 league appearances, scoring four goals, and scored the lone goal in Varažin's 1–2 Croatian Football Cup loss to Cibalia. He helped Varaždin to a second-place finish in the Croatian Second Football League, earning a spot in the promotion playoff against Istra 1961, which they lost 3–2 on aggregate.

On 23 January 2019, Golubar and Varaždin agreed to the mutual termination of his contract so that he could pursue opportunities abroad.

=== Valour FC ===
On 14 February 2019, Golubar signed with new Canadian Premier League side Valour FC. Golubar only got to play in three games for Valour during the 2019 Canadian Premier League season due to sustaining a season ending injury early on. On 29 November 2019, the club announced that Golubar would not be returning for the 2020 season.

=== Return to Neuberg ===
On 21 January 2020, Golubar signed with his former club SV Neuberg, now playing in the Burgenland 2. Liga Süd of the Austrian 2. Landesliga.

=== Varteks ===
Varteks

== Honours ==
Zavrč

- Slovenian Second League: 2012–13

Individual

- Slovenian Second League top scorer: 2012–13
