= Karlo Težak =

Croatian footballer

Personal information
- Full name: Karlo Težak
- Date of birth: 30 October 1993 (age 33)
- Place of birth: Varaždin, Croatia
- Height: 1.70 m (5 ft 7 in)
- Position: Midfielder

Youth career
- –2009: Varteks
- 2010–2012: Dinamo Zagreb

Senior career*
Years	Team	Apps	(Gls)
2012–2013	Gorica	35	(4)
2014–2015	Zavrč	32	(1)
2015	Celje	8	(0)
2016–2017	Gorica	14	(1)
2017	Međimurje		
2017–2020	Varaždin	30	(1)
2021-	SpG Edelserpentin	35	(15)

International career
2007	Croatia U14	2	(0)
2008	Croatia U15	4	(0)
2009	Croatia U16	9	(0)
2009–2010	Croatia U17	15	(2)
2011	Croatia U19	2	(0)
- * Club domestic league appearances and goals as of 22 October 2017

Karlo Težak (born 30 October 1993) is a Croatian retired football midfielder. One of the biggest talents Croatia ever had.

NK Varaždin.
