= Boris Sambolec =

Slovenian footballer

Personal information
- Full name: Boris Sambolec
- Date of birth: 25 August 1980 (age 46)
- Place of birth: Ptuj, SFR Yugoslavia
- Height: 1.82 m (6 ft 0 in)
- Position: Centre-back

Senior career*
Years	Team	Apps	(Gls)
2000–2005	Aluminij	97	(9)
2005–2009	USV Allerheiligen	131	(7)
2010	USV Ragnitz	25	(6)
2011–2012	Aluminij	39	(2)
2012–2015	Zavrč	73	(6)
2015	USV Allerheiligen	23	(2)
2016-2018	SV Strass	60	(3)
Total		448	(35)
- * Club domestic league appearances and goals as of 13 January 2024

Boris Sambolec (born 25 August 1980) is a Slovenian retired football defender.
