= Arpad Vaš =

Slovenian footballer (born 1989)

Personal information
- Date of birth: 31 July 1989 (age 37)
- Place of birth: Lendava, SFR Yugoslavia
- Height: 1.67 m (5 ft 6 in)
- Position: Midfielder

Team information
- Current team: Rudar Mursko Središće

Youth career
- –2007: Nafta Lendava

Senior career*
Years	Team	Apps	(Gls)
2006–2012	Nafta Lendava	71	(5)
2009	→ Veržej (loan)	7	(0)
2009–2010	→ Čarda (loan)	22	(10)
2012–2013	Mura 05	30	(1)
2013	Aluminij	13	(1)
2014	Zavrč	2	(0)
2014–2016	Veržej	50	(17)
2016–2018	Mura	48	(19)
2018–2019	Nafta 1903	22	(1)
2020–	Rudar Mursko Središće		

International career
2007	Slovenia U18	3	(0)
- * Club domestic league appearances and goals as of 23 June 2022

Arpad Vaš (Hungarian: Vass Árpád; born 31 July 1989) is a Slovenian footballer who plays as a midfielder for Rudar Mursko Središće in Croatia.

== Career statistics ==
Domestic league matches only.

Season	Club	Division	Apps	Goals
2005–06	Nafta Lendava	First League	2	0
2007–08	Nafta Lendava	First League	8	1
2008–09	Nafta Lendava	First League	9	1
2008–09	Veržej	Third League	7	0
2009–10	Nafta Lendava	First League	3	0
2009–10	Čarda	Third League	22	10
2010–11	Nafta Lendava	First League	30	1
2011–12	Nafta Lendava	First League	19	2
2012–13	Mura 05	First League	30	1
2013–14	Aluminij	Second League	13	1
2013–14	Zavrč	First League	2	0
2014–15	Veržej	Second League	25	8
2015–16	Veržej	Second League	25	9
2016–17	Mura	Third League	26	14
2017–18	Mura	Second League	22	5
2018–19	Nafta 1903	Second League	22	1
