= Cejle =

- Municipality
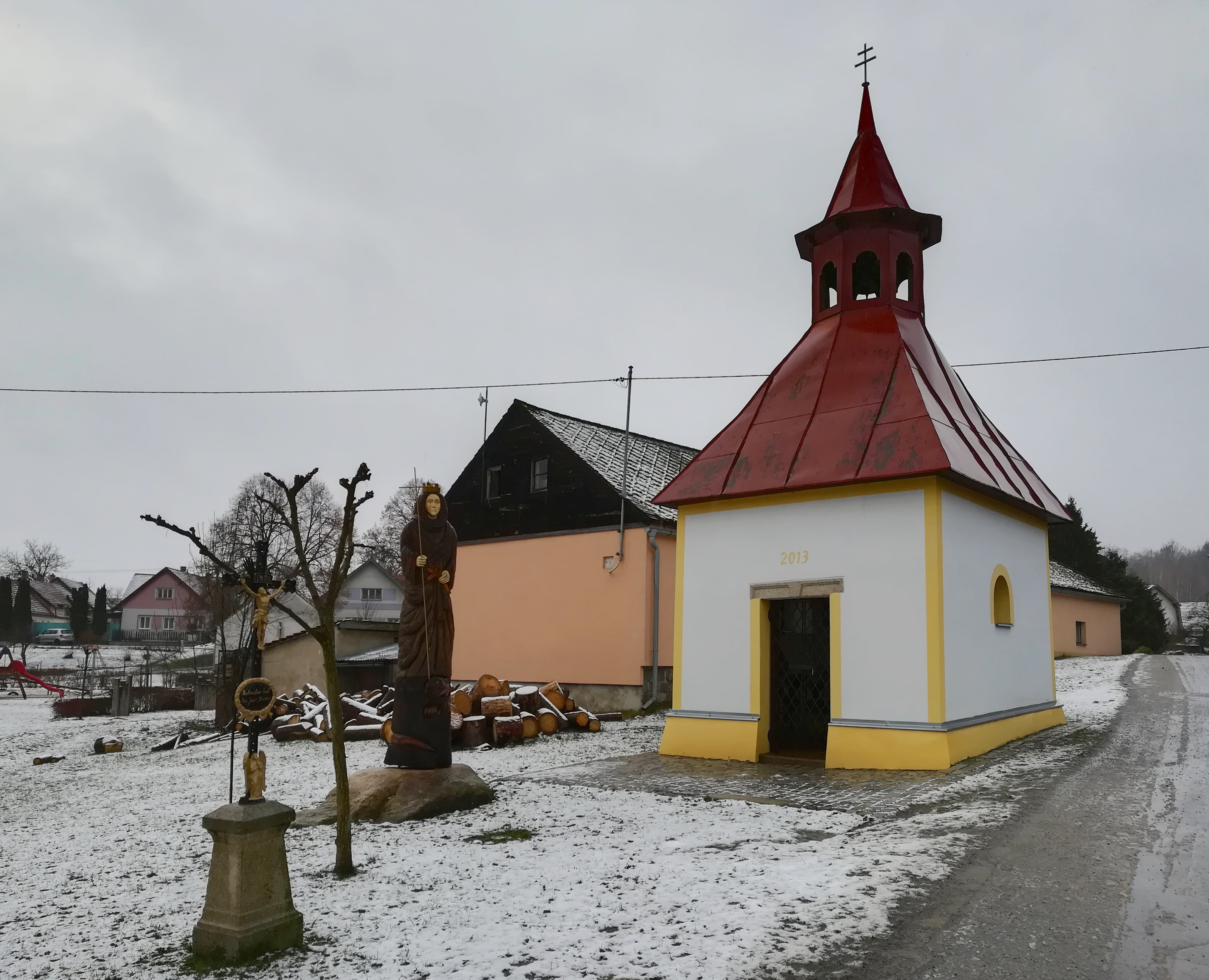
- Chapel of Saint Margaret the Virgin

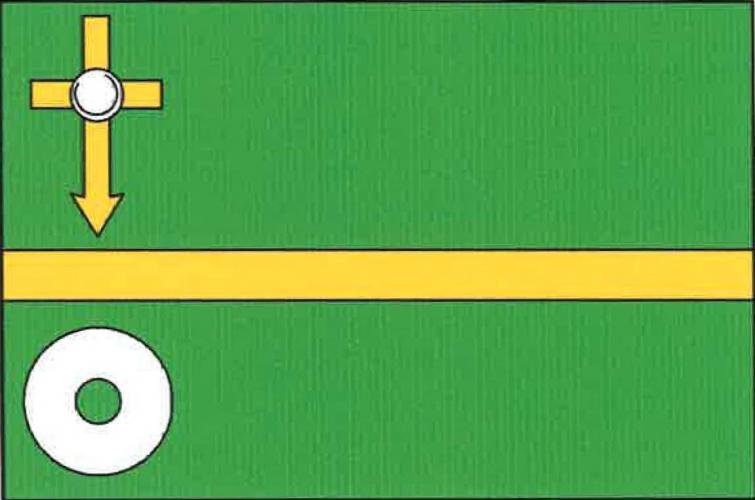
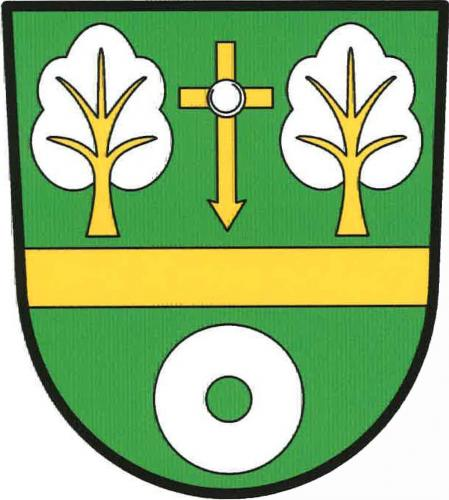
- Flag Coat of arms

- Location in the Czech Republic
- Coordinates: 49°22′10″N 15°28′22″E
- Country: Czech Republic
- Region: Vysočina
- District: Jihlava
- First mentioned: 1360

Area
  - Total: 12.69 km^{2} (4.90 sq mi)
- Elevation: 546 m (1,791 ft)

Population (2026-01-01)
  - Total: 519
  - Density: 40.9/km^{2} (106/sq mi)
- Time zone: UTC+1 (CET)
  - Summer (DST): UTC+2 (CEST)
- Postal code: 588 51
- Website: www.cejle.cz

Cejle (Czech pronunciation: [ˈtsɛjlɛ]) is a municipality and village in Jihlava District in the Vysočina Region of the Czech Republic. It has about 500 inhabitants.

Cejle lies approximately 9 kilometres (6 mi) south-west of Jihlava and 111 km (69 mi) south-east of Prague.

== Administrative division ==
Cejle consists of two municipal parts (in brackets population according to the 2021 census):

- Cejle (489)
- Hutě (27)

== Demographics ==
Historical population
Year	Pop.	±%
1869	670	—
1880	656	−2.1%
1890	651	−0.8%
1900	688	+5.7%
1910	646	−6.1%
1921	670	+3.7%
1930	678	+1.2%
1950	485	−28.5%
1961	478	−1.4%
1970	405	−15.3%
1980	407	+0.5%
1991	379	−6.9%
2001	393	+3.7%
2011	442	+12.5%
2021	516	+16.7%
Source: Censuses
