= Dejan Kurbus =

Slovenian footballer (born 1993)

Personal information
- Date of birth: 16 January 1993 (age 33)
- Place of birth: Slovenia
- Position: Centre-back

Team information
- Current team: USV Gabersdorf
- Number: 20

Youth career
- –2008: Veržej
- 2008–2012: Maribor

Senior career*
| Years | Team | Apps | (Gls) |
| 2012–2013 | Mura 05 | 15 | (1) |
| 2013–2014 | Zavrč | 27 | (1) |
| 2014–2015 | Zamora | 25 | (0) |
| 2015–2016 | Sestao River | 27 | (1) |
| 2016–2017 | USV Allerheiligen | 15 | (1) |
| 2017–2019 | Mura | 17 | (1) |
| 2019– | USV Gabersdorf | 101 | (10) |

International career
| 2011 | Slovenia U19 | 1 | (0) |
- * Club domestic league appearances and goals as of 12 June 2024

Dejan Kurbus (born 16 January 1993) is a Slovenian footballer who plays as a central defender for USV Gabersdorf.
