= Josip Fuček =

Croatian footballer

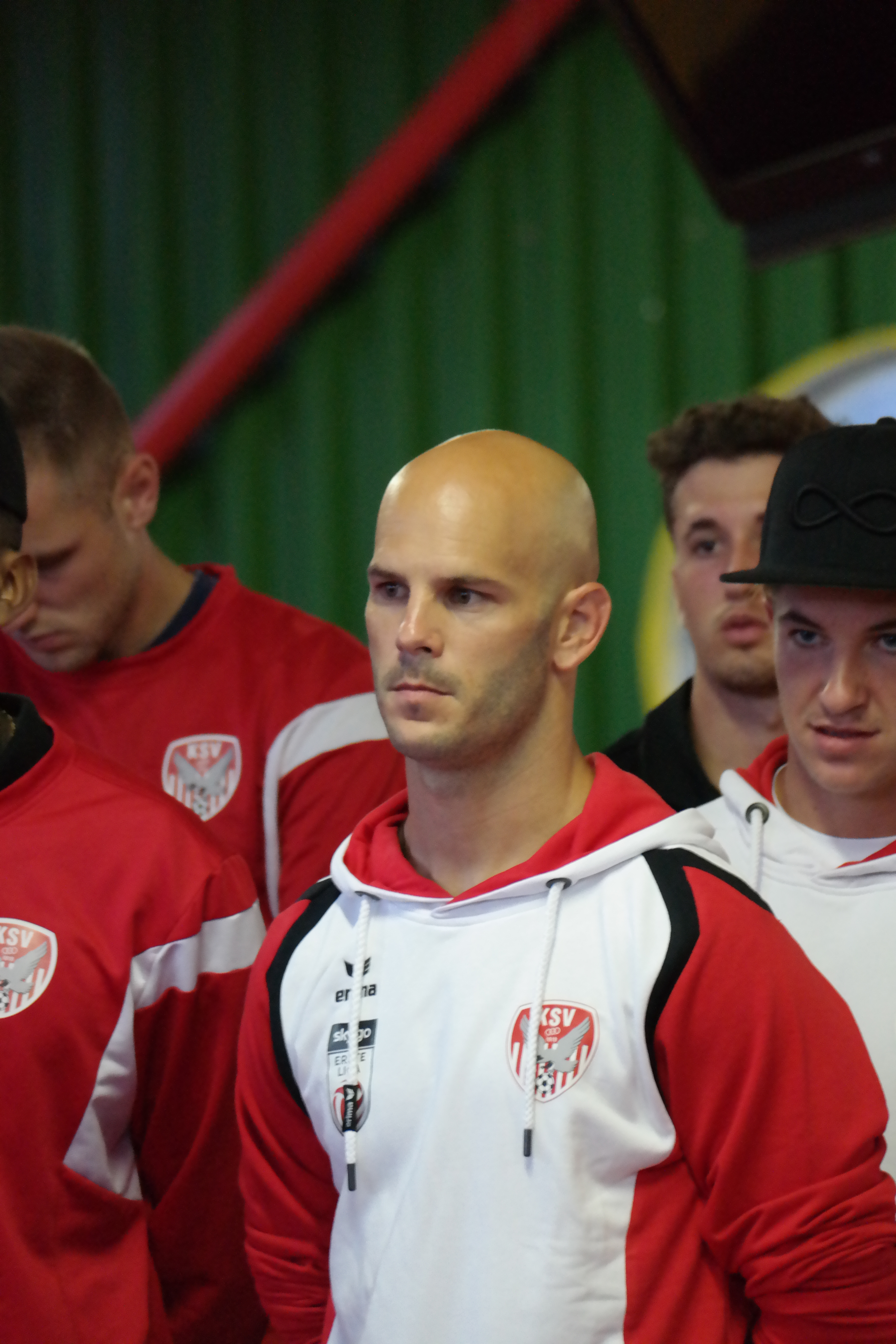

Personal information
- Full name: Josip Fuček
- Date of birth: 26 February 1985 (age 41)
- Place of birth: Zagreb, SFR Yugoslavia
- Height: 1.77 m (5 ft 10 in)
- Position: Forward

Team information
- Current team: NK Sesvetski Kraljevec
- Number: 7

Senior career*
Years	Team	Apps	(Gls)
–2005	Zagreb		
2005–2006	Istra 1961	9	(1)
2006	Samobor		
2006–2007	Croatia Sesvete		
2007	Suhopolje		
2008–2011	Lučko	16	(3)
2012	Hartberg	13	(1)
2012–2013	Zelina	10	(3)
2013	RNK Split	2	(0)
2013–2014	Zavrč	29	(4)
2014–2016	Krka	65	(12)
2016	Vikingur Reykjavik	7	(1)
2017	Poli Timișoara	15	(1)
2017–2018	Kapfenberger SV	8	(0)
2018	SV Neuberg	7	(4)
2019	USV Mettersdorf	15	(7)
2019	Jarun Zagreb		
2020	SAK Klagenfurt	0	(0)
2020–	NK Sesvetski Kraljevec		

International career
2001	Croatia U16	4	(0)
2001	Croatia U17	1	(0)
- * Club domestic league appearances and goals as of 19:23, 10 February 2021 (UTC)

Josip Fuček (born 26 February 1985) is a Croatian football forward.

== Club career ==
In August 2019, Fuček returned to Croatia and joined NK Jarun Zagreb. He left the club at the end of the year. In 2016, he had a spell with Iceland club Vikingur Reykjavik.

In January 2020, he moved to Austria again and joined SAK Klagenfurt. However, he only played a few friendly games for the club and no official games due to the COVID-19 pandemic. In August 2020, Fuček joined NK Sesvetski Kraljevec.
