= Matija Smrekar =

Croatian footballer (born 1989)

Personal information
- Date of birth: 8 April 1989 (age 37)
- Place of birth: Zabok, SR Croatia, SFR Yugoslavia
- Height: 1.85 m (6 ft 1 in)
- Position: Forward

Team information
- Current team: Mladost Zabok
- Number: 9

Youth career
- Zagorec Krapina
- Varteks

Senior career*
Years	Team	Apps	(Gls)
2006–2010	Varteks	69	(16)
2010–2011	Sedan	13	(2)
2012	Charleroi	22	(2)
2013	Maribor	10	(0)
2014	Zavrč	19	(10)
2015	Pandurii	1	(0)
2016	Birkirkara	8	(5)
2016–2023	Zagorec Krapina	186	(146)
2023–	Mladost Zabok	11	(18)

International career
2005	Croatia U16	3	(0)
2005	Croatia U17	9	(2)
2005–2007	Croatia U18	5	(1)
2006–2008	Croatia U19	10	(1)
2008–2009	Croatia U20	5	(0)
2008–2009	Croatia U21	4	(2)
- * Club domestic league appearances and goals as of 6 November 2023

Matija Smrekar (born 8 April 1989) is a Croatian footballer who plays as a forward for Mladost Zabok.

In the 2007–08 season, Smrekar won the Croatian under-19 league with the junior team of Varteks, and was one of the best players throughout the season.

== Career ==
Smrekar made his senior debut in the Croatian First League with Varteks on 14 April 2007 against Osijek in an eventual 1–0 defeat.

== Honours ==
Maribor

- Slovenian PrvaLiga: 2012–13
- Slovenian Football Cup: 2012–13
