= Peter Murko =

Slovenian footballer

Personal information
- Full name: Peter Murko
- Date of birth: 3 May 1984 (age 42)
- Place of birth: Maribor, SFR Yugoslavia
- Position: Centre-back

Youth career
- 2000-2002: Aluminij

Senior career*
Years	Team	Apps	(Gls)
2002-2004	Aluminij		
2005	Dravinja		
2005–2007	Zavrč	43	(1)
2009	MU Šentjur	13	(0)
2009	UFC Fehring	29	(0)
2010–2014	Zavrč	83	(4)
2014	SV Wildon	11	(0)
2015	Drava Ptuj	4	(0)
2015	Ac Linden Leibnitz	12	(0)
2016	TuS Paldau	4	(0)
2016	Zavrč	5	(0)
2017-2020	SD Starse		
- * Club domestic league appearances and goals as of 26 May 2014

Peter Murko (born 3 May 1984) is a Slovenian retired football defender who last played for SD Starse
