= Lamin Diallo =

Slovenian footballer

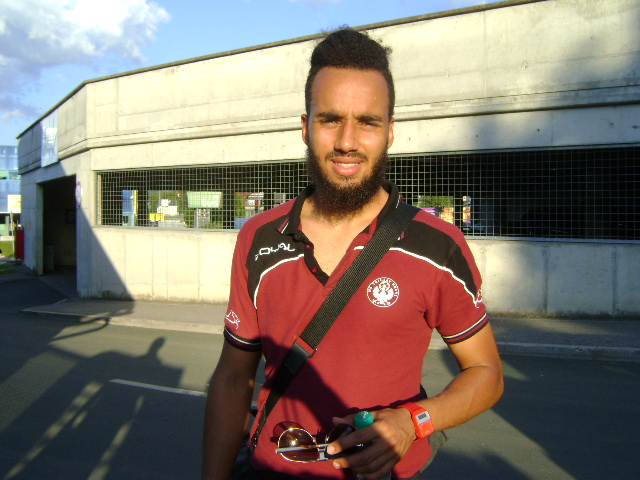

Personal information
- Full name: Lamin Diallo
- Date of birth: 31 August 1991 (age 35)
- Place of birth: Ljubljana, Slovenia
- Height: 1.86 m (6 ft 1 in)
- Position: Defender

Youth career
- 2000–2005: Slovan
- 2005–2007: Domžale
- 2007–2009: Treviso
- 2009–2010: Chievo

Senior career*
Years	Team	Apps	(Gls)
2011–2013	Domžale	11	(1)
2012	→ Triglav Kranj (loan)	13	(0)
2013–2014	Triglav Kranj	31	(5)
2014–2015	Krka	6	(0)
2016	Šenčur	9	(0)
2016–2018	Ilirija 1911	37	(4)
2018–2019	Mladost Doboj Kakanj	15	(0)
2019	Trikala	12	(0)
2020	Egaleo	1	(0)
2020	Iraklis Psachna		
2021	Spittal/Drau	0	(0)

International career
2009	Slovenia U19	2	(0)
- * Club domestic league appearances and goals as of 18 August 2020

Lamin Diallo (born 31 August 1991) is a professional football defender who last played for Spittal/Drau.

== International career ==
Born in Slovenia to a Guinean father and Slovene mother, Diallo was a youth international for Slovenia. He was called up to the Guinea national football team for a pair of friendlies in November 2017.
