= Aleš Čeh (footballer, born 1980) =

Slovenian footballer

Personal information
- Date of birth: 22 July 1980 (age 46)
- Place of birth: Ptuj, SFR Yugoslavia
- Height: 1.76 m (5 ft 9 in)
- Position: Midfielder

Senior career*
Years	Team	Apps	(Gls)
2000–2003	Aluminij	80	(29)
2003–2004	Maribor	3	(0)
2004–2006	Drava Ptuj	52	(8)
2007–2008	Nafta Lendava	75	(8)
2009	Drava Ptuj	17	(6)
2009–2010	Nafta Lendava	42	(5)
2011	Drava Ptuj	11	(1)
2011–2014	Zavrč	53	(13)
2014–2015	SV Ilz	12	(4)
2015–2016	Drava Ptuj	32	(8)
2019	Podvinci	10	(1)

International career
1997	Slovenia U17	2	(1)
1998	Slovenia U18	7	(1)
2000	Slovenia U20	2	(0)

Managerial career
- Podvinci
- 2022: Drava Ptuj
- 2023–: Podvinci
- * Club domestic league appearances and goals

Aleš Čeh (born 22 July 1980) is a retired Slovenian footballer who played as a midfielder.

He had a short stint abroad with Austrian side SV Ilz.
