= Gianvito Misuraca =

Italian footballer (born 1990)

Personal information
- Full name: Gianvito Misuraca
- Date of birth: 2 April 1990 (age 36)
- Place of birth: Palermo, Italy
- Height: 1.80 m (5 ft 11 in)
- Position: Striker

Team information
- Current team: Giulianova
- Number: 26

Youth career
- 2000–2005: Tieffe Parmonval
- 2005–2009: Palermo

Senior career*
Years	Team	Apps	(Gls)
2009–2013	Vicenza	60	(5)
2012	→ Grosseto (loan)	6	(0)
2013–2015	Parma	0	(0)
2013–2014	→ Gorica (loan)	30	(8)
2014–2015	→ Pisa (loan)	31	(3)
2015–2016	Bassano	31	(6)
2016–2023	Pordenone	148	(7)
2022	→ Bari (loan)	5	(0)
2022–2023	→ Fermana (loan)	35	(2)
2023–2024	Fermana	35	(4)
2024–2025	L'Aquila	31	(1)
2025–2026	Trodica		
2026–	Giulianova	7	(3)

International career
2009–2010	Italy U20	10	(1)
2011–2012	Italy U21 B	2	(0)
2010–2011	Italy U21	8	(0)
- * Club domestic league appearances and goals as of 1 March 2026

Gianvito Misuraca (born 2 April 1990) is an Italian professional footballer who plays as a striker for Serie D club Giulianova.

== Club career ==
He is a product of Palermo youth academy. In 2009, he was sent to Serie B club Vicenza in a co-ownership deal for €240,000. Co-currently, Palermo signed 50% of the registration rights of Nicola Rigoni for €990,000, On 15 November 2009, he made his debut in Serie B in a match against Ancona. He concluded his first professional season with 15 appearances. In June 2010, the co-ownerships were renewed. In June 2012, Vicenza acquired Misuraca outright for free.

In 2013, he was signed by Parma. On 1 August Misuraca, Berardocco, Checcucci, Favalli, Gigli, Vanin and Vicente were signed by Slovenian club ND Gorica on temporary deals from Parma.

On 23 July 2014, Misuraca was signed by Pisa.

In September 2015, he moved to Bassano; the following year he was bought from Pordenone.

On 31 January 2022, Misuraca joined Bari on loan. On 1 September 2022, Misuraca moved on a new loan to Fermana.

On 27 July 2023, Misuraca returned to Fermana on a permanent basis.

== International career ==
He was part of the Italy U20 squad at the 2009 FIFA U-20 World Cup. On 17 November 2010 he made his debut with the Italy U21 in a friendly game against Turkey. He participated in the 2011 Toulon Tournament with the U21. Misuraca played twice in the tournament. During the 2011–12 season, he was capped twice for the Italy under-21 Serie B representative team.

== Honours ==
Gorica

- Slovenian Football Cup: 2013–14

Bari

- Serie C: 2021–22 (Group C)
