= Dino Kresinger =

Croatian footballer (born 1982)

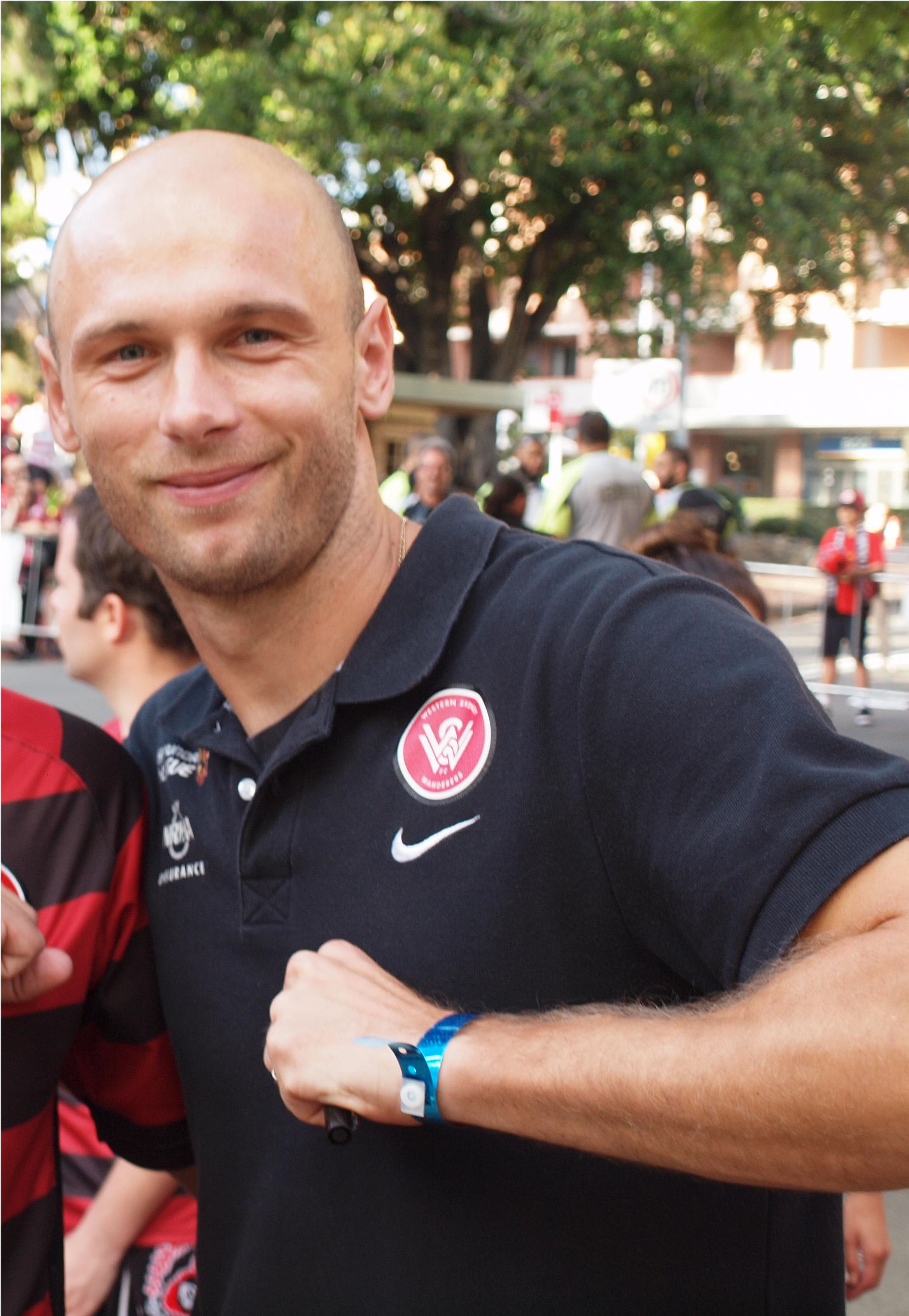
- Kresinger in 2013

Personal information
- Full name: Dino Kresinger
- Date of birth: 20 March 1982 (age 44)
- Place of birth: Čakovec, SR Croatia, Yugoslavia
- Height: 1.88 m (6 ft 2 in)
- Position: Forward

Team information
- Current team: Obreš
- Number: 11

Senior career*
Years	Team	Apps	(Gls)
2001–2004	Varteks	4	(0)
2004–2007	Međimurje	88	(26)
2007	Cibalia	8	(2)
2007–2009	Slaven Belupo	54	(6)
2009–2012	Cibalia	68	(21)
2012–2013	Western Sydney Wanderers	25	(2)
2013–2015	Zavrč	44	(12)
2015–2016	Široki Brijeg	20	(4)
2016–2017	Varaždin	6	(5)
2017–2019	SC Stainz	48	(17)
2019–2020	SV Kaindorf	12	(2)
2020–	Obreš		

International career
1998–2000	Croatia U17	4	(0)
2003	Croatia U20	1	(0)
- * Club domestic league appearances and goals as of 16 December 2019

Dino Kresinger (born 20 March 1982 in Čakovec) is a Croatian football striker who currently plays for Croatian lower league club NK Obreš Sveti Ilija

== Club career ==
=== Early career ===
Kresinger was born in the Croatian city of Čakovec and started his professional career in the nearby city of Varaždin, at NK Varteks. In the three years he spent with the 1. HNL club, he made just four appearances. This led him to move to the newly promoted NK Međimurje, a side from Čakovec, the city of his birth. In his time at Međimurje, Dino scored an impressive 26 goals in 88 appearances. In January 2007, Dino moved to another Croatian first division side in HNK Cibalia. He spent just five months with Cibalia, scoring twice in six appearances. He then moved to NK Slaven Belupo. In his first season at Slaven Belupo, he managed five assists in 28 league games, mostly playing in the number 10 role. In his second season at the club, he managed six goals and two assists in 32 appearances. He then returned to HNK Cibalia for the 2009/10 season. In the next three season at Cibalia, Dino managed 21 goals in 68 appearances.

=== Western Sydney Wanderers ===
On 13 August 2012, it was announced that Kresinger had signed with A-League club Western Sydney Wanderers. An experienced campaigner in the Croatian league, Kresinger had spent the last 11 seasons plying his trade making over 200 appearances for five different clubs. He was brought into the squad to add a level of experience to the newly founded team as well as strength and aggression to the forward line. On 21 December 2012, Kresinger scored his first goal in the regular season for the Wanderers from a well worked header in the 6–1 thumping of Adelaide United at the Parramatta Stadium.

Throughout the season Kresinger made a name for himself in the A-League through his strength, creating space for other team-mates and ability to retain possession he created many chances and goals for the Wanderers. He saved his best for last as his second goal in the 2013 A-League season came through a back-heel flick against Brisbane Roar in the semi-final and secured his team's place in the Grand Final against competition favourites Central Coast Mariners.

Kresinger, along with Tarek Elrich, Joey Gibbs, and Rocky Visconte, were released by the Wanderers at the conclusion of the 2012–13 season.

=== Zavrč ===
On 31 July 2013, it was announced that Kresinger had signed with top flight Slovenian club Zavrč. In his first season in Slovenia, Dino managed 7 goals and 4 assists in 26 appearances in all competitions.

He had spells with two Austrian lower league clubs before he ended his career.

== International career ==
A talented junior, Kresinger represented Croatia at both Under-17 and Under-20 levels.
