= Marko Roškar =

Slovenian footballer

Personal information
- Full name: Marko Roškar
- Date of birth: 21 October 1992 (age 34)
- Place of birth: Ptuj, Slovenia
- Height: 1.82 m (6 ft 0 in)
- Position: Centre-back

Youth career
- –2011: Drava Ptuj

Senior career*
Years	Team	Apps	(Gls)
2009–2011	Drava Ptuj	23	(0)
2011–2012	Interblock	19	(0)
2012–2013	Triglav Kranj	18	(0)
2013–2014	Zavrč	40	(0)
2015–2016	Drava Ptuj	29	(1)
2016	Aluminij	1	(0)
2016–2017	Drava Ptuj	22	(0)
2017–2018	Bravo	16	(0)

International career
2010	Slovenia U19	5	(0)
2011–2013	Slovenia U20	9	(0)
2013	Slovenia U21	1	(0)
- * Club domestic league appearances and goals as of 19 June 2019

Marko Roškar (born 21 October 1992) is a Slovenian football defender.
