= Josip Marošević =

Croatian footballer

Personal information
- Full name: Josip Marošević
- Date of birth: 13 July 1987 (age 39)
- Place of birth: Vareš SFR Yugoslavia
- Height: 1.87 m (6 ft 2 in)
- Position: Forward

Team information
- Current team: Križevci

Senior career*
Years	Team	Apps	(Gls)
–2007	Koprivnica		
2007–2008	Víkingur Ólafsvík	21	(9)
2009	Križevci		
2009	Víkingur Ólafsvík	7	(6)
2009–2011	Gorica	12	(3)
2011–2012	Zelina	29	(28)
2012–2013	Hrvatski Dragovoljac	24	(9)
2013–2014	Krka	22	(5)
2014	Rudeš	10	(2)
2015	UFC Markt Allhau	3	(0)
2015–2016	Zelina		
2016	Maksimir		
2016–2017	TuS Greinbach	19	(20)
2017	SC Kemeten	12	(13)
2017-	Križevci		
- * Club domestic league appearances and goals as of 26 September 2016

Josip Marošević (born 13 July 1987) is a Croatian football forward.

== Club career ==
Marošević had a spell in Iceland with second tier-outfit Víkingur Ólafsvík and played in the Austrian lower leagues.
