= Andrej Dugolin =

Slovenian footballer

Personal information
- Date of birth: 19 September 1986 (age 40)
- Place of birth: Ptuj, SFR Yugoslavia
- Position: Midfielder

Team information
- Current team: FC Bad Radkersburg
- Number: 8

Youth career
- –2005: Aluminij

Senior career*
Years	Team	Apps	(Gls)
2005–2009	Aluminij	90	(10)
2009–2010	Olimpija Ljubljana	20	(0)
2010–2011	Drava Ptuj	20	(3)
2011	Stojnci		
2012–2014	Zavrč	57	(3)
2015–2018	St. Anna/Aigen	96	(10)
2018–2019	UFC Bad Radkersburg-Laafeld	15	(1)
2019–2020	SVU Sturm Klöch	13	(1)
2020–	FC Bad Radkersburg	63	(19)
- * Club domestic league appearances and goals as of 30 September 2023

Andrej Dugolin (born 19 September 1986) is a Slovenian footballer who plays as a midfielder for FC Bad Radkersburg. His first club was Aluminij.

== Career ==
Dugolin has been playing in the Austrian lower leagues since 2015.
