= Igor Jugović =

Croatian footballer

Personal information
- Full name: Igor Jugović
- Date of birth: 23 January 1989 (age 37)
- Place of birth: Zagreb, SR Croatia, SFR Yugoslavia
- Height: 1.78 m (5 ft 10 in)
- Position: Midfielder

Team information
- Current team: Opatija
- Number: 4

Youth career
- –2008: Zagreb

Senior career*
Years	Team	Apps	(Gls)
2008–2012	Zagreb	77	(0)
2012	Irtysh Pavlodar	2	(0)
2012	Istra 1961	15	(1)
2013	Slaven Belupo	8	(0)
2013–2015	Celje	45	(3)
2015–2016	Sheriff Tiraspol	5	(0)
2016–2018	Fjölnir	63	(3)
2019	Hrvatski Dragovoljac	12	(1)
2019–2021	Kustošija	24	(1)
2021–2022	Jarun	27	(5)
2023–	Opatija		

International career
	Croatia U16	3	(0)
	Croatia U17	11	(0)
	Croatia U18	9	(1)
2007–2008	Croatia U19	9	(0)
- * Club domestic league appearances and goals as of 10 September 2022

Igor Jugović (born 23 January 1989) is a Croatian football midfielder who plays for NK Opatija in the Croatian Second Football League.

== Club career ==
Jugović left Istra 1961 after only half a year in January 2013 and moved to Celje in Slovenia after another half year-spell at Slaven Belupo. He later played three years for Icelandic top tier-side Fjölnir.
