= Christian Bubalović =

Austrian footballer (born 1991)

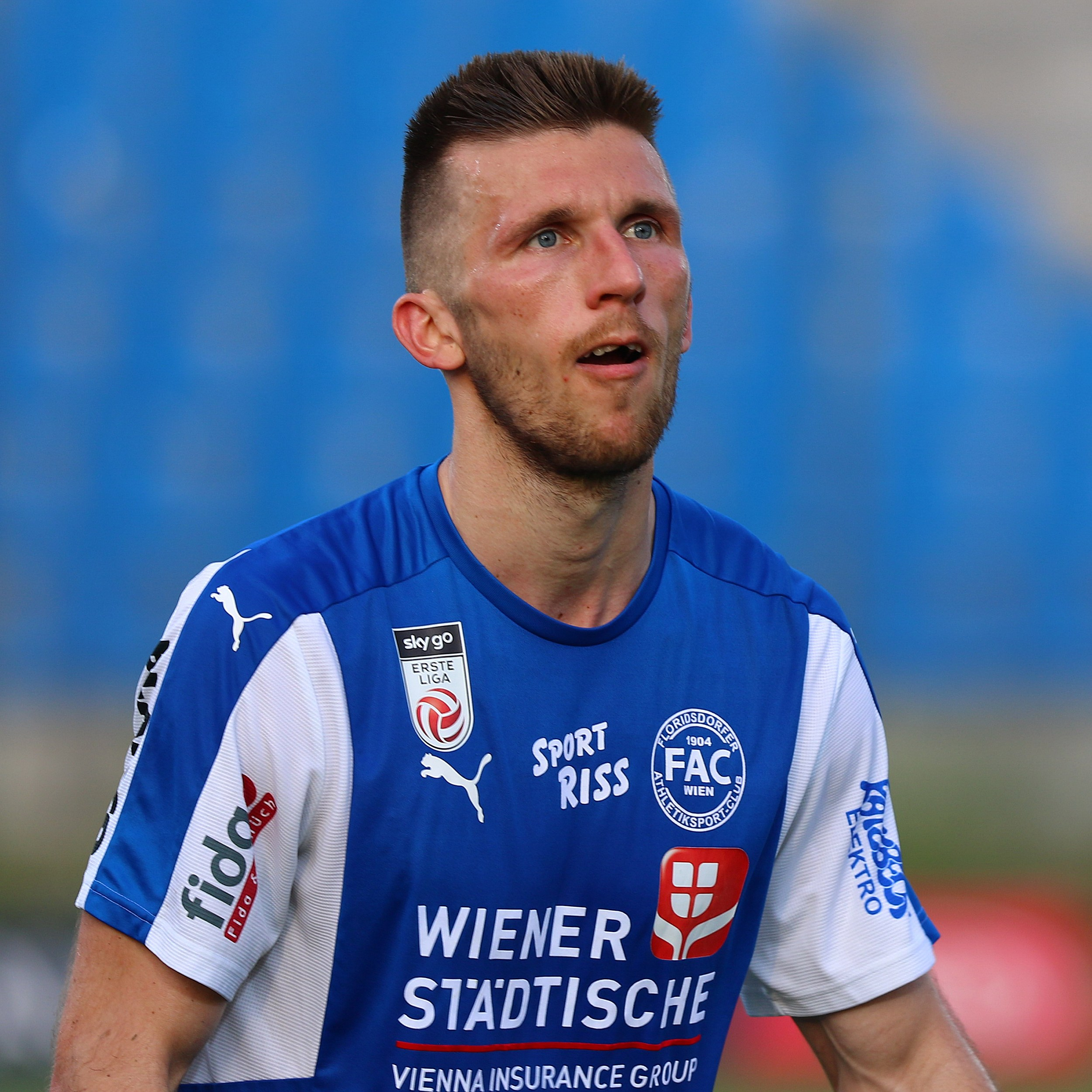

Personal information
- Full name: Christian Bubalović
- Date of birth: 9 August 1991 (age 35)
- Place of birth: Vienna, Austria
- Height: 1.91 m (6 ft 3 in)
- Position: Centre-back

Team information
- Current team: SC-ESV Parndorf 1919
- Number: 37

Youth career
- 1999–2002: SV Wienerberg
- 2002–2006: Rapid Wien
- 2006–2007: 1. Simmeringer SC
- 2007–2008: Admira Wacker
- 2008–2010: Energie Cottbus

Senior career*
Years	Team	Apps	(Gls)
2010–2012	Energie Cottbus II	48	(2)
2012–2014	Rudar Velenje	50	(4)
2014–2016	Kapfenberger SV	50	(4)
2016–2017	Birkirkara	36	(4)
2017–2025	Floridsdorfer AC	189	(18)
2025–	SC-ESV Parndorf 1919	30	(2)

International career
	Austria U19	2	(0)
- * Club domestic league appearances and goals as of 28 June 2026

Christian Bubalović (born 9 August 1991) is an Austrian professional footballer who plays as a centre-back for SC-ESV Parndorf 1919. He holds both the Austrian and Croatian citizenship.
