= Miha Kokol =

Slovenian footballer

Personal information
- Full name: Miha Kokol
- Date of birth: 23 November 1989 (age 36)
- Place of birth: Maribor, SFR Yugoslavia
- Height: 1.83 m (6 ft 0 in)
- Position: Left-back

Team information
- Current team: FV St. Andrä/Höch
- Number: 17

Youth career
- –2008: Maribor

Senior career*
Years	Team	Apps	(Gls)
2008–2010	Maribor	3	(0)
2009	→ Bela Krajina (loan)	11	(2)
2010	→ Malečnik (loan)	8	(5)
2010	Nafta Lendava	6	(1)
2011	Drava Ptuj	10	(5)
2011	Aluminij	12	(4)
2012–2014	Zavrč	50	(8)
2014	Gorica	2	(0)
2015	Koper	3	(0)
2015–2016	TUS St. Veit/Vogau	22	(4)
2016–2019	USV Deutsch Goritz	71	(36)
2019–2021	SVU Weinburg	23	(17)
2021–2022	SVU RB Tieschen	25	(18)
2022–	FV St. Andrä/Höch	32	(53)

International career
2007	Slovenia U18	8	(3)
2007	Slovenia U19	5	(1)
- * Club domestic league appearances and goals as of 18 November 2023

Miha Kokol (born 23 November 1989) is a Slovenian football defender who plays for Austrian lower league side FV St. Andrä/Höch.
