= Darko Čeferin =

Slovenian football referee (born 1968)

- Born: 7 November 1968 (age 57); Kranj, SR Slovenia, SFR Yugoslavia

Domestic
Years	League	Role

International
Years	League	Role
2000–2012	FIFA listed	Referee

Darko Čeferin (born 7 November 1968) is a Slovenian former football referee serving as head of the Referee commission for the Football Association of Bosnia and Herzegovina since 2025. He was active as a referee internationally between 2000 and 2013, when he was no longer included on the FIFA list for Slovenia.

Čeferin served as a referee in the 2002, 2006, and 2010 World Cup qualifiers. He also officiated in qualifying matches for UEFA Euro 2004, 2008 and 2012.
