= Andraž Žurej =

Slovenian footballer

Personal information
- Full name: Andraž Žurej
- Date of birth: 17 May 1993 (age 33)
- Place of birth: Slovenia
- Position: Forward

Team information
- Current team: WSV Frantschach
- Number: 9

Youth career
- –2009: Aluminij
- 2008–2009: → Dravinja (loan)
- 2009–2012: Celje

Senior career*
Years	Team	Apps	(Gls)
2012–2015	Celje	69	(6)
2012	→ Dravinja (loan)	11	(5)
2015	Austria Klagenfurt	1	(0)
2015	ASK Köflach	13	(3)
2016–2019	SK St. Andrä	92	(51)
2019	SC St. Stefan	16	(9)
2020–2022	Dravinja	15	(3)
2023-	WSV Frantschach	16	(2)

International career
2013	Slovenia U20	1	(1)
2014	Slovenia U21	1	(0)
- * Club domestic league appearances and goals as of 16 February 2024

Andraž Žurej (born 17 May 1993) is a Slovenian football forward who plays for WSV Frantschach.
