= Nusmir Fajić =

Bosnian footballer

Personal information
- Date of birth: 12 January 1987 (age 39)
- Place of birth: Bosanska Krupa, SFR Yugoslavia
- Height: 1.91 m (6 ft 3 in)
- Position: Centre-forward

Team information
- Current team: Sloga Bosanska Otoka
- Number: 11

Senior career*
Years	Team	Apps	(Gls)
2005–2008	Zvijezda Gradačac		
2008–2009	Rudar Prijedor		
2009–2011	Travnik	42	(16)
2011–2012	Mura 05	49	(25)
2013–2014	Maribor	43	(20)
2015	Dinamo Minsk	8	(1)
2015	Vitez	6	(1)
2016	Xinjiang Tianshan Leopard	21	(9)
2017	Universitatea Craiova	5	(0)
2017–2018	Krupa	19	(7)
2018–2020	Velež Mostar	47	(32)
2020	Jedinstvo Bihać	12	(3)
2021–2022	Bjelovar	20	(14)
2022–	Sloga Bosanska Otoka		
- * Club domestic league appearances and goals as of 19 May 2022

Nusmir Fajić (born 12 January 1987) is a Bosnian professional footballer who plays as a centre-forward for Bjelovar.

== Honours ==
Maribor

- Slovenian PrvaLiga: 2012–13, 2013–14
- Slovenian Cup: 2012–13
- Slovenian Supercup: 2013, 2014

Velež Mostar

- First League of FBiH: 2018–19
