= Sebastjan Gobec =

Slovenian footballer (born 1979)

Personal information
- Date of birth: 6 December 1979 (age 46)
- Place of birth: Celje, SFR Yugoslavia
- Position: Midfielder

Youth career
- Celje

Senior career*
Years	Team	Apps	(Gls)
1996–2007	Celje	294	(21)
2008	Sint-Truiden	12	(1)
2008–2015	Celje	194	(16)
Total		500	(38)

International career
1995	Slovenia U16	2	(1)
1997	Slovenia U18	4	(0)
1998	Slovenia U20	3	(0)
1999–2001	Slovenia U21	15	(1)
2005–2006	Slovenia	2	(0)
2006	Slovenia B	1	(1)
- * Club domestic league appearances and goals

Sebastjan Gobec (born 6 December 1979) is a retired Slovenian footballer who played as a defender. He is the all-time most capped player in the Slovenian PrvaLiga with 488 appearances.

== Club career ==
Gobec started his career at Celje's youth sides. He made his first team debut on 2 March 1997 in a league match against Primorje. In the following two seasons, he established himself as a first team regular. In December 2007, Gobec left Celje after ten seasons and signed with Sint-Truiden. He played twelve matches and scored one goal in the Belgian First Division, before returning to Celje in June 2008.

== International career ==
Gobec played two matches for the Slovenia national team. He made his international debut on 9 February 2005 in a friendly against the Czech Republic.

== Honours ==
Celje

- Slovenian Cup: 2004–05
