= NK Zavrč =

Zavrč
- Full name: Nogometni klub Zavrč
- Nicknames: Beli (The Whites); Haložani
- Founded: 1969; 57 years ago (as ŠD Bratstvo Zavrč)
- Dissolved: 2016; 10 years ago
- Ground: Zavrč Sports Park
- Capacity: 962
Home colours	Away colours

Nogometni klub Zavrč or simply NK Zavrč was a Slovenian football club from Zavrč. The club was founded in 1969 and ceased operations in 2016 due to financial difficulties. The same year, it was refounded as DNŠ Zavrč and started at the bottom of the football pyramid.

== History ==
The club was founded in 1969 under the name ŠD Bratstvo Zavrč. During the 2016–17 season, Zavrč was dissolved due to financial difficulties. In 2016, a new club was founded under the name DNŠ Zavrč. Legally, the two clubs' records and honours are kept separate by the Football Association of Slovenia.

Between 2008–09 and 2012–13, Zavrč earned five consecutive promotions from the sixth division to the Slovenian PrvaLiga, the top level of Slovenian football.

== Stadium ==
Zavrč Sports Park, also known as Zavrč Stadium, is located in Zavrč. The stadium received floodlights in May 2012. However, the floodlights were removed in 2017 and sold to Aluminij due to financial problems of the club. In 2013 the stadium was completely renovated with the old stand demolished and a new main stand constructed, which opened in 2015. The stand has a seating capacity of 962.

== Honours ==
- Slovenian Second League
  - Winners: 2012–13
- Slovenian Third League
  - Winners: 2004–05, 2006–07, 2011–12
- Slovenian Fourth Division
  - Winners: 2003–04, 2010–11
- Slovenian Fifth Division
  - Winners: 2001–02, 2009–10
- Slovenian Sixth Division
  - Winners: 2008–09
- MNZ Ptuj Cup
  - Winners: 2003–04, 2005–06, 2007–08, 2010–11, 2011–12, 2012–13

== League history since 1991 ==
Season	League	Position
1991–98	No competitions entered	
1998–99	MNZ Ptuj 2. Class (level 5)	8th
1999–2000	MNZ Ptuj 2. Class (level 5)	8th
2000–01	MNZ Ptuj 2. Class (level 5)	10th
2001–02	MNZ Ptuj 2. Class (level 5)	1st
2002–03	MNZ Ptuj 1. Class (level 4)	4th
2003–04	MNZ Ptuj 1. Class (level 4)	1st
2004–05	3. SNL – East	1st (Note: Declined promotion to the Slovenian Second League.)
2005–06	3. SNL – East	6th
2006–07	3. SNL – East	1st
2007–08	2. SNL	7th (Note: Withdrew from the league after the season.)
2008–09	MNZ Ptuj 2. Class (level 6)	1st
2009–10	MNZ Ptuj 1. Class (level 5)	1st
2010–11	Styrian League (level 4)	1st
2011–12	3. SNL – East	1st
2012–13	2. SNL	1st
2013–14	1. SNL	5th
2014–15	1. SNL	5th
2015–16	1. SNL	9th (Note: Won the relegation play-offs, but did not obtain a licence for the 1. SNL.)
2016–17	2. SNL	10th (Note: Withdrew from the league after 12 rounds.)
