= 2013–14 NK Maribor season =

NK Maribor
2013–14 season
- President: Drago Cotar
- Head Coach: Ante Čačić; Ante Šimundža
- Stadium: Ljudski vrt
- Slovenian League: Winners
- Slovenian Cup: Runners-up
- Slovenian Supercup: Winners
- Champions League: Play-off round
- Europa League: Round of 32
- Top goalscorer: League: Nusmir Fajić (16); All: Nusmir Fajić (19)
- Highest home attendance: 12,700 vs Sevilla (20 February 2014)
- Lowest home attendance: 700 vs Šenčur (4 December 2013)
- Average home league attendance: 3,089
Home colours	Away colours

The 2013–14 season was the 54th season in the history of NK Maribor and the club's 23rd consecutive season in the Slovenian PrvaLiga since the league establishment in 1991. The team participated in the Slovenian PrvaLiga, Slovenian Football Cup, UEFA Champions League, and UEFA Europa League. The season covers the period from 1 June 2013 to 31 May 2014.

After winning the Slovenian version of the treble (league, cup and supercup) during the previous season, Maribor came close to repeating this achievement during the 2013–14 season, however, they were denied on 21 May 2014 when they were defeated by Gorica in the Slovenian Cup final. However, the club was not without success as they have managed to win the Slovenian Supercup for the third time in their history and were crowned PrvaLiga champions for the fourth consecutive time and twelfth time overall. The Supercup title was won under the leadership of Croatian manager Ante Čačić, who was replaced by former player Ante Šimundža early in the season. In UEFA competitions, Maribor qualified for the UEFA Europa League group stage for the third successive season and, after winning seven points in a group with Rubin Kazan, Zulte Waregem and Wigan Athletic, they qualified for the knockout phase, becoming the first Slovenian club to do so. In the round of 32, Maribor faced Sevilla and were defeated with the score 4–3 on aggregate. The Spanish side went out to win the competition a few months later.

Bosnian striker Nusmir Fajić was the club's top scorer during the season with 19 goals, 16 of which were scored in the Slovenian PrvaLiga. Club captain Marcos Tavares made history in the second part of the season when he became Maribor's all-time top goalscorer, surpassing the previous record by Branko Horjak (117 goals). He has also surpassed the joint-record previously held by Ante Šimundža and Kliton Bozgo, who both scored 78 league goals for the club. During the season, Maribor maintained an average home league attendance of 3,089. In addition, Maribor were the only PrvaLiga team that had an average league attendance of over 1,000 spectators.

== Season overview ==
Before the start of the 2013–14 season, Croatian manager Ante Čačić replaced Darko Milanič as the head coach at the club. Milanič, who has decided to accept an offer from Austrian Sturm Graz, has won a total of nine domestic trophies with Maribor, between 2008 and 2013, more than any other coach in the club's history. Weeks after the departure of Milanič, Sturm acquired Maribor's forward Robert Berić in a transfer reportedly worth one million euros.

The 2012–13 season was one of the most successful seasons in history of the club as Maribor won the domestic version of the treble, having won the league, cup and supercup titles. In addition, Maribor has qualified to the UEFA Europa League for the second successive year, where they have won four points in a group with Lazio, Panathinaikos and Tottenham.

The start of the 2013–14 season saw Maribor competing in their fifth successive Slovenian Supercup, which was played against the Slovenian PrvaLiga runners-up Olimpija. Although the previous Supercup editions were traditionally played at the venue of the league champions, this was not the case for the 2013 Slovenian Supercup edition, as the Football Association of Slovenia decided for a neutral venue in Celje. Nevertheless, Maribor prevailed and won the final 3–0, securing their third Slovenian Supercup title.

Under Čačić's leadership, the club did particularly well in the Slovenian PrvaLiga, maintaining a perfect score during the first six league rounds. During the 2013–14 UEFA Champions League qualifiers the team did not fare so well, managing only one win in six matches, however, Maribor did qualify for the group stage of the 2013–14 UEFA Europa League for the third successive season after they have eliminated Cypriot club APOEL (1–1 on aggregate). On 19 September 2013, the team played their first match in the group stage of the UEFA Europa League and was defeated by the Russian side Rubin Kazan. This was followed by the first league defeat against Zavrč three days later. In the following week, Maribor played at home against Rudar Velenje and away against Koper and managed to get only a point against the side from Velenje. A day after their 2–1 defeat in Koper, the club announced the termination of Čačić's contract. He was replaced by Ante Šimundža, who was an assistant manager at Maribor between 2008 and 2011 and has spent a total of 10 seasons at the club as a player in the 1990s.

With Šimundža at the helm the club continued with poor form in the top division, suffering two defeats in the first four matches with the new coach, however, they eventually won five out of eight matches, which ensured them a top place finish after the first part of the season, maintaining a two-point lead ahead of Koper. The club also managed to qualify into the semi-final of the Slovenian Cup after they have knocked out two second division teams, Radomlje and Šenčur. Maribor's biggest success, however, came in the UEFA Europa League where they have won seven points in the remaining five matches and finished on second place in their group, qualifying to the UEFA Europa League knockout phase for the first time in the club's history, becoming the first Slovenian club to play European football in the second part of the season. In the Round of 32 they played in a two-legged tie against the Spanish side Sevilla and lost by an aggregate score of 4–3.

However, the UEFA Europa League elimination did not affect the team in domestic competition as Maribor managed to win 12 out of 17 league matches in the second part of the season, losing only two in the process. The club eventually won their 12th league title, with eight point lead ahead of Koper. Things were looking bright for the team in the Slovenian Cup as well, when Maribor defeated Olimpija in the semi-final and reached the final for the fifth successive season. In the Cup final, which was played at a neutral venue in Koper, Maribor faced Gorica and were defeated with the score 2–0. The season was marked by Marcos Tavares who set two goalscoring records. He has become the club's all-time leading goalscorer when he passed Branko Horjak's 117 goals in official competitions. In addition, he has also passed a joint record previously held by Ante Šimundža and Kliton Bozgo (78) for the most goals scored for the club in the Slovenian PrvaLiga. The final match of the season was played on 25 May 2014 against Domžale and was marked by the farewell of Dejan Mezga who has spent eight seasons with the club and whose contract was due to expire at the end of the season.

== Supercup ==
7 July 2013 Final	Maribor	3–0	Olimpija	Celje
20:00 CET	Tavares 25'; Mezga 45+1'; Cvijanović 63'; Mejač (yellow card) 85'	Report (in Slovene)		Stadium: Arena Petrol; Attendance: 1,800; Referee: Darko Čeferin

Colour key: Green = Maribor win; Yellow = draw; Red = opponents win.

== Slovenian League ==
=== Standings ===
Pos	Team	Pld	W	D	L	GF	GA	GD	Pts	Qualification or relegation
1	Maribor (C)	36	24	5	7	78	31	+47	77	Qualification to Champions League second qualifying round
2	Koper	36	21	6	9	52	36	+16	69	Qualification to Europa League first qualifying round
3	Rudar	36	18	9	9	55	33	+22	63	Qualification to Europa League first qualifying round
4	Gorica	36	16	10	10	60	32	+28	58	Qualification to Europa League second qualifying round
5	Zavrč	36	16	5	15	58	63	−5	53	

Source: Slovenian PrvaLiga (in Slovene)
Rules for classification: 1) points; 2) goal difference; 3) number of goals scored.
(C) Champions

==== Results summary ====
Overall								Home						Away					
Pld	W	D	L	GF	GA	GD	Pts	W	D	L	GF	GA	GD	W	D	L	GF	GA	GD
36	24	5	7	78	31	+47	77	10	5	3	42	22	+20	14	0	4	36	9	+27

Last updated: 25 May 2014.

==== Results by round ====
Round	1	2	3	4	5	6	7	8	9	10	11	12	13	14	15	16	17	18	19	20	21	22	23	24	25	26	27	28	29	30	31	32	33	34	35	36
Ground	H	A	H	A	H	H	A	H	A	A	H	A	H	A	A	H	A	H	H	A	H	A	H	H	A	H	A	A	H	A	H	A	A	H	A	H
Result	W	W	W	W	W	W	W	D	W	L	D	L	W	W	L	L	W	W	L	W	D	L	W	D	W	W	W	W	L	W	W	W	W	W	W	D
Position	2	1	1	1	1	1	1	1	1	1	1	1	1	1	1	1	1	1	1	1	1	1	1	1	1	1	1	1	1	1	1	1	1	1	1	1

Updated to match(es) played on 25 May 2014. Source: PrvaLiga website
A = Away; H = Home; W = Win; D = Draw; L = Loss

=== Matches ===
12 July 2013 1	Maribor	2–1	Zavrč	Maribor
20:00 CET	Bohar 52'; Milec (yellow card) 64'; Mezga (yellow card) 79'; Fajić 89'	Report	Golubar 2'; Brlečić (yellow card) 66'; Kelenc (yellow card) 78'	Stadium: Ljudski vrt Attendance: 4,500; Referee: Matej Jug

20 July 2013 2	Rudar Velenje	0–3	Maribor	Velenje
19:00 CET	Rotman (yellow card) 44'; Knezović (yellow card) 73'	Report	Tavares 7'; Mertelj (yellow card) 34'; Fajić 44'; Mejač (yellow card) 73'; Arghus (yellow card) 75'; Mendy 78'	Stadium: Ob Jezeru; Attendance: 2,000; Referee: Dejan Balažič

27 July 2013 3	Maribor	6–1	Koper	Maribor
17:30 CET	Mendy 3'; Bohar 40'; Črnic 47', 56'; Ibraimi 73' (pen.), 87'	Report	Reja (yellow card) 25'; Guberac 76' (f. k.)	Stadium: Ljudski vrt Attendance: 2,500; Referee: Dragoslav Perić

2 March 2014 4	Olimpija	0–3	Maribor	Ljubljana
15:00 CET		Report	Bohar 34'; Milec (yellow card) 36'; Fajić 78'; Mendy (yellow card) 70' (goal) 90+4'	Stadium: Stožice; Attendance: 5,000; Referee: Damir Skomina

10 August 2013 5	Maribor	3–0	Krka	Maribor
20:00 CET	Mendy 42'; Dervišević 58'; Mevlja (yellow card) 70' (red card) 90+3'; Fajić 84'	Report		Stadium: Ljudski vrt Attendance: 2,800; Referee: Dejan Balažič

16 August 2013 6	Maribor	5–1	Celje	Maribor
20:00 CET	Tavares 5', 6'; Mertelj 24'; Bohar 49'; Mendy 70'	Report	Verbič (yellow card) 51'; Čadikovski 58'; Žitko (yellow card) 67'; Kolman (yellow card) 78'	Stadium: Ljudski vrt Attendance: 2,200; Referee: Damir Skomina

24 August 2013 7	Triglav Kranj	0–1	Maribor	Kranj
17:00 CET	Pokorn (yellow card) 68'; Stjepanović (yellow card) 82'	Report	Fajić 56'	Stadium: Stanko Mlakar Stadium; Attendance: 800; Referee: Matej Jug

31 August 2013 8	Maribor	1–1	Gorica	Maribor
18:30 CET	Tavares 27'	Report	Vetrih (yellow card) 52'; Lapadula 82'	Stadium: Ljudski vrt Attendance: 1,500; Referee: Davor Drečnik

14 September 2013 9	Domžale	0–1	Maribor	Domžale
17:30 CET	Banović (yellow card) 88'; Vidmar (yellow card) 90+2'	Report	Mendy 10'; Arghus (yellow card) 45'	Stadium: Sports Park; Attendance: 1,000; Referee: Bojan Mertik

22 September 2013 10	Zavrč	1–0	Maribor	Zavrč
19:00 CET	Murko 16'; Dugolin (yellow card) 90'	Report	Rajčević (yellow card) 15'; Ceppelini (yellow card) 63'; Milec (yellow card) 90+4'; Trajkovski (yellow card) 90+4'	Stadium: Zavrč Sports Park; Attendance: 2,200; Referee: Matej Jug

25 September 2013 11	Maribor	1–1	Rudar Velenje	Maribor
19:30 CET	Mendy (yellow card) 41' (goal) 50'	Report	Firer 21'; Klinar (yellow card) 35'; Kašnik (yellow card) 41'; Rozman (yellow card) 59'; Jeseničnik (yellow card) 83'	Stadium: Ljudski vrt Attendance: 1,200; Referee: Roberto Ponis

28 September 2013 12	Koper	2–1	Maribor	Koper
20:30 CET	Lotrič 14'; Žibert 27' (yellow card) 90+1'; Ivetić (yellow card) 66'; Halilović (yellow card) 69'; Šme (yellow card) 79'	Report	Dodlek (yellow card) 59'; Mendy (yellow card) 69'; Trajkovski (yellow card) 81'; Filipović (yellow card) 83'; Tavares 90'; Arghus (yellow card) 90+5'	Stadium: Bonifika; Attendance: 1,000; Referee: Vojko Goričan

6 October 2013 13	Maribor	2–0	Olimpija	Maribor
17:00 CET	Mendy 21' (yellow card) 36'; Rajčević (yellow card) 23'; Viler (yellow card) 63'; Bohar 66'	Report	Fink (yellow card) 17'; Šporar (yellow card) 49'; Jović (yellow card) 53'	Stadium: Ljudski vrt Attendance: 6,500; Referee: Darko Čeferin

19 October 2013 14	Krka	0–5	Maribor	Novo Mesto
15:00 CET	Mbognou (yellow card) 60'; Kastrevec (yellow card) 87'	Report	Arghus (yellow card) 5'; Milec (yellow card) 28' (goal) 40', 45'; Filipović (yellow card) 53'; Tavares 58'; Mendy 72'; Mezga 90'	Stadium: Portoval; Attendance: 700; Referee: Damir Skomina

27 October 2013 15	Celje	1–0	Maribor	Celje
15:00 CET	Žurej 90+3'	Report	Milec (yellow card) 31'; Fajić (yellow card) 50'; Vuklišević (yellow card) 75'; Rajčević (yellow card) 79'	Stadium: Arena Petrol; Attendance: 1,300; Referee: Mitja Žganec

3 November 2013 16	Maribor	1–2	Triglav Kranj	Maribor
17:00 CET	Tavares 38'; Mertelj (yellow card) 45'; Arghus (yellow card) 47'; Filipović (yellow card) 90+1'	Report	Pokorn (yellow card) 22'; Arghus 35' (o.g.); Šmit (yellow card) 66'; Curanović (yellow card) 89'; Redžić 90+1'	Stadium: Ljudski vrt Attendance: 1,500; Referee: Bojan Mertik

10 November 2013 17	Gorica	1–2	Maribor	Nova Gorica
17:00 CET	Favalli (yellow card) 12'; Živec 33'; Vicente (yellow card) 71'	Report	Črnic (yellow card) 38'; Tavares 39' (yellow card) 90+9'; Bohar 83'; Viler (yellow card) 89'	Stadium: Sports Park; Attendance: 830; Referee: Dragoslav Perić

23 November 2013 18	Maribor	5–3	Domžale	Maribor
17:00 CET	Arghus 4'; Fajić 38'; Mezga 41' (yellow card) 49'; Bohar 77'; Črnic 85'	Report	Majer 12'; Parker 22'; Janža 50'; Korun (yellow card) 62'	Stadium: Ljudski vrt Attendance: 900; Referee: Roberto Ponis

1 December 2013 19	Maribor	3–4	Zavrč	Maribor
14:30 CET	Vuklišević (yellow card) 20' (yellow card) 43' (red card); Viler 31'; Fajić 45'; Črnic (yellow card) 55'; Tavares 90+3'	Report	Kokol 2' (yellow card) 71'; Roj (yellow card) 30'; Kresinger 48'; Golubar (red card) 60'; Kurbus (yellow card) 64'; Kelenc 77'; Šafarić (yellow card) 86'; Matjašič 90'	Stadium: Ljudski vrt Attendance: 2,000; Referee: Damir Skomina

7 December 2013 20	Rudar Velenje	0–1	Maribor	Velenje
17:30 CET	Rotman (yellow card) 28'; Podlogar (yellow card) 87'	Report	Fajić (yellow card) 67'; Mezga 73'; Viler (yellow card) 75'	Stadium: Ob Jezeru; Attendance: 1,200; Referee: Dejan Balažič

8 March 2014 21	Maribor	2–2	Koper	Maribor
16:00 CET	Fajić (yellow card) 59' (goal) 65'; Arghus (yellow card) 87'; Cvijanović 90+1'; Zahović (yellow card) 90+1'	Report	Štromajer 25'; Žibert (yellow card) 76'; Šme (yellow card) 86'; Pučko 89'	Stadium: Ljudski vrt Attendance: 5,000; Referee: Miran Bukovec

15 March 2014 22	Olimpija	2–0	Maribor	Ljubljana
20:00 CET	Rodić 2' (yellow card) 35'; Fink (yellow card) 35'; Trifković 45'; Vukčević (yellow card) 50'; Djermanović (yellow card) 77' (yellow card) 82' (red card)	Report	Arghus (yellow card) 53'; Cvijanović (yellow card) 88'; Filipović (yellow card) 90'	Stadium: Stožice; Attendance: 100; Referee: Matej Jug

22 March 2014 23	Maribor	3–1	Krka	Maribor
18:00 CET	Cvijanović 47' (yellow card) 75'; Mendy 80'; Mezga (yellow card) 81'; Tavares 90+1'	Report	Kastrevec 44'; Zeljković (yellow card) 85'	Stadium: Ljudski vrt Attendance: 2,500; Referee: Roberto Ponis

29 March 2014 24	Maribor	2–2	Celje	Maribor
16:30 CET	Mezga 11'; Fajić 33' (yellow card) 43'; Filipović (yellow card) 44'; Arghus (yellow card) 78'	Report	Gobec 32' (pen.); Bilali (yellow card) 52'; Rajsel 61'	Stadium: Ljudski vrt Attendance: 2,000; Referee: Damir Skomina

5 April 2014 25	Triglav Kranj	0–2	Maribor	Kranj
16:00 CET	Peternel (yellow card) 68'	Report	Mendy 39'; Cvijanović 61' (pen.)	Stadium: Stanko Mlakar Stadium; Attendance: 800; Referee: Dejan Balažič

12 April 2014 26	Maribor	2–0	Gorica	Maribor
20:05 CET	Mendy (yellow card) 30'; Mertelj (yellow card) 37'; Cvijanović (yellow card) 40' (goal) 41', 60' (pen.); Filipović (yellow card) 75'	Report	Modolo (red card) 59'; Mastriani (yellow card) 88'; Berardocco (yellow card) 89'; Bazzoffia (red card) 90+3'	Stadium: Ljudski vrt Attendance: 3,000; Referee: Mitja Žganec

16 April 2014 27	Domžale	1–2	Maribor	Domžale
19:00 CET	Zec (yellow card) 4'; Živec 78'; Ožbolt (yellow card) 83'	Report	Mendy 24'; Šuler (yellow card) 55'; Viler 80'	Stadium: Sports Park; Attendance: 1,100; Referee: Damir Skomina

19 April 2014 28	Zavrč	0–4	Maribor	Zavrč
19:30 CET	Fuček (yellow card) 16'	Report	Fajić 18' (yellow card) 44'; Mendy (yellow card) 35' (goal) 54'; Milec (yellow card) 45'; Arghus 49'; Vršič 87'	Stadium: Sports Park; Attendance: 1,500; Referee: Davor Drečnik

23 April 2014 29	Maribor	0–2	Rudar Velenje	Maribor
17:30 CET	Viler (yellow card) 61'	Report	Podlogar (yellow card) 9' (goal) 18'; Stjepanović (yellow card) 36'; Eterović (yellow card) 58'; Klinar 70'; Rozman (yellow card) 90+1'	Stadium: Ljudski vrt Attendance: 2,000; Referee: Dragoslav Perić

26 April 2014 30	Koper	0–1	Maribor	Koper
20:05 CET	Galešić (yellow card) 52'; Halilović (yellow card) 84'; Čovilo (yellow card) 84'; Hadžič (yellow card) 90+2'	Report	Tavares 44' (yellow card) 60'	Stadium: Bonifika; Attendance: 2,500; Referee: Matej Jug

3 May 2014 31	Maribor	2–0	Olimpija	Maribor
20:05 CET	Djermanović 5' (o.g.); Cvijanović 66' (pen.)	Report	Zarifović (red card) 65'; Džafić (yellow card) 72'	Stadium: Ljudski vrt Attendance: 5,500; Referee: Damir Skomina

7 May 2014 32	Krka	0–4	Maribor	Novo Mesto
17:00 CET		Report	Filipović (yellow card) 41'; Fajić (yellow card) 42' (goal) 50', 86'; Tavares 46', 60'	Stadium: Portoval; Attendance: 400; Referee: Vojko Goričan

10 May 2014 33	Celje	0–4	Maribor	Celje
16:30 CET	Kolman (yellow card) 13'; Korošec (yellow card) 45'	Report	Mendy 7'; Milec 27'; Fajić 50', 77'; Črnic (yellow card) 84'	Stadium: Arena Petrol; Attendance: 1,350; Referee: Miran Bukovec

13 May 2014 34	Maribor	2–1	Triglav Kranj	Maribor
20:00 CET	Fajić 18' 43'; Arghus (yellow card) 29' (red card) 51'	Report	Redžić 31'; Palibrk (yellow card) 80'	Stadium: Ljudski vrt Attendance: 4,000; Referee: Asmir Sagrković

17 May 2014 35	Gorica	1–2	Maribor	Nova Gorica
17:00 CET	Bationo (yellow card) 31'; Favalli (yellow card) 38'; Lapadula 51'	Report	Tavares (yellow card) 43'; Živko 84'; Stojanović 87'	Stadium: Sports Park; Attendance: 400; Referee: Mitja Žganec

25 May 2014 36	Maribor	0–0	Domžale	Maribor
17:00 CET	Arghus (yellow card) 90+1'	Report	Dobrovoljc (yellow card) 73'; Gorenc Stanković (yellow card) 85'; Horić (yellow card) 87'	Stadium: Ljudski vrt Attendance: 6,000; Referee: Andrej Žnidaršič

Colour key: Green = Maribor win; Yellow = draw; Red = opponents win.

Notes

1. The match between Olimpija and Maribor was originally scheduled on 3 August 2013, but was postponed and rescheduled to a later date, as both teams were unsatisfied with the original kick-off time and were also, at the time, still competing in the UEFA club competitions (e.g. UEFA Champions League and UEFA Europa League).
2. The match was played behind closed doors, due to punishment issued by the Football Association of Slovenia.

== Slovenian Cup ==
30 October 2013 Round of 16	Radomlje	1–4	Maribor	Domžale
18:00CET	Barukčič (yellow card) 16'; Lidjan (yellow card) 33'; Snoj (yellow card) 40'; Zavrl 54'	Report (in Slovene)	Vuklišević (yellow card) 21'; Cvijanović 29'; Filipović (yellow card) 55'; Mendy 70' 87' 90'	Stadium: Sports Park; Attendance: 1,500; Referee: Nejc Kajtazović

13 November 2013 Quarter-finals 1st leg	Šenčur	2–5	Maribor	Šenčur
18:00 CET	Kotnik (yellow card) 22'; Tabot (yellow card) 29'; Košnik (yellow card) 44'; Ajdovec (yellow card) 59'; Pavlin 70' (pen.); Dolžan (yellow card) 74'; Nunić 87'	Report (in Slovene)	Milec 20' (pen.) 30'; Bohar (yellow card) 28'; Trajkovski (yellow card) 44'; Mezga 56'; Stojanović 67' (yellow card) 78'; Fajić 89'	Stadium: Šenčur Sports Park; Attendance: 800; Referee: Sašo Habjanič

4 December 2013 Quarter-finals 2nd leg	Maribor	1–1 (6–3 agg.)	Šenčur	Maribor
17:00 CET	Zahović 35'	Report (in Slovene)	Jerković (yellow card) 33'; Dolžan 54'	Stadium: Ljudski vrt Attendance: 700; Referee: Mitja Žganec

26 March 2014 Semi-finals 1st leg	Maribor	1–0	Olimpija	Maribor
20:05 CET	Cvijanović 23'; Mendy (yellow card) 77'; Stojanović (yellow card) 84'	Report (in Slovene)	Trifković (yellow card) 22'	Stadium: Ljudski vrt Attendance: 7,000; Referee: Dragoslav Perić

2 April 2014 Semi-finals 2nd leg	Olimpija	1–1 (1–2 agg.)	Maribor	Ljubljana
17:30 CET	Trifković (yellow card) 35'; Šuler 45' (o.g.); Rodić (yellow card) 63'; Kapun (yellow card) 90'	Report (in Slovene)	Mejač (yellow card) 45'; Fajić 54' (yellow card) 72'	Stadium: Stožice; Attendance: 4,000; Referee: Matej Jug

21 May 2014 Final	Maribor	0–2	Gorica	Koper
20:30 CET	Fajić (yellow card) 44'	Report (in Slovene)	Gigli (yellow card) 59'; Berardocco (yellow card) 68'; Finocchio 78', 85' (yellow card) 90+3'	Stadium: Bonifika; Attendance: 3,500; Referee: Damir Skomina

Colour key: Green = Maribor win; Yellow = draw; Red = opponents win.

Notes

3. The match between Radomlje and Maribor was originally scheduled on 18 September 2013, but was postponed and rescheduled to a later date, as Maribor played their first match of the 2013–14 UEFA Europa League on 19 September 2013.
4. The quarter-final matches between Šenčur and Maribor were postponed and rescheduled to a later date, as during the original first and second leg schedule (e.g. 23 October 2013 and 30 October 2013) the opponent of Šenčur was not established, as Maribor played their Round of 16 match against Radomolje on 30 October 2013.

== European campaign ==
=== UEFA Champions League ===
==== Second qualifying round ====
16 July 2013 First leg	Birkirkara (Malta)	0–0	(Slovenia) Maribor	Ta' Qali, Malta
19:30 CET	Camenzuli (yellow card) 54'; Sciberras (yellow card) 79'; Fenech (yellow card) 80'	Report; Report (in Slovene)	Filipović (yellow card) 88'	Stadium: Ta' Qali National Stadium; Attendance: 1,419; Referee: Radu Petrescu (Romania)

24 July 2013 Second leg	Maribor (Slovenia)	2–0 (2–0 agg.)	(Malta) Birkirkara	Maribor, Slovenia
20:00 CET	Cvijanović 28' (f. k.); Viler 47'; Tavares (yellow card) 50'	Report; Report (in Slovene)	Muscat (yellow card) 44'; Haber (yellow card) 50'	Stadium: Ljudski vrt Attendance: 9,036; Referee: Andris Treimanis (Latvia)

Colour key: Green = Maribor win; Yellow = draw; Red = opponents win.

==== Third qualifying round ====
31 July 2013 First leg	APOEL (Cyprus)	1–1	(Slovenia) Maribor	Nicosia, Cyprus
19:00 CET	Gonçalves 21' (yellow card) 82'; Oliviera (yellow card) 68'; Manduca (yellow card) 78'; Budimir (yellow card) 90+3'	Report; Report (in Slovene)	Filipović (yellow card) 55'; Tavares 64'; Handanović (yellow card) 89'	Stadium: GSP Stadium; Attendance: 17,387; Referee: Serhiy Boyko (Ukraine)

6 August 2013 Second leg	Maribor (Slovenia)	0–0 (1–1 (a) agg.)	(Cyprus) APOEL	Maribor, Slovenia
20:00 CET	Filipović (yellow card) 68'; Bohar (yellow card) 90'	Report; Report (in Slovene)	Alexandrou (yellow card) 56'; Gonçalves (red card) 86'; Morais (yellow card) 89'; Oliviera (yellow card) 90+1'	Stadium: Ljudski vrt Attendance: 12,100; Referee: Aleksei Kulbakov (Belarus)

Colour key: Green = Maribor win; Yellow = draw; Red = opponents win.

==== Play-off round ====
20 August 2013 First leg	Viktoria Plzeň (Czech Republic)	3–1	(Slovenia) Maribor	Plzeň, Czech Republic
20:45 CET	Čišovský 8'; Darida 58'; Hořava (yellow card) 75'; Ďuriš (yellow card) 80' (goal) 89'	Report; Report (in Slovene)	Cvijanović (yellow card) 34'; Mejač 66'	Stadium: Doosan Arena; Attendance: 11,158; Referee: Olegário Benquerença (Portugal)

28 August 2013 Second leg	Maribor (Slovenia)	0–1 (1–4 agg.)	(Czech Republic) Viktoria Plzeň	Maribor, Slovenia
20:45 CET	Viler (yellow card) 29'; Filipović (yellow card) 74'; Milec (yellow card) 89'	Report; Report (in Slovene)	Tecl 3'; Kolář (yellow card) 90'	Stadium: Ljudski vrt Attendance: 12,306; Referee: Felix Brych (Germany)

Colour key: Green = Maribor win; Yellow = draw; Red = opponents win.

=== UEFA Europa League ===
==== Group D ====
Pos	Team	Pld	W	D	L	GF	GA	GD	Pts	Qualification	RUB	MAR	ZUL	WIG
1	(Russia) Rubin Kazan	6	4	2	0	14	4	+10	14	Advance to knockout phase	—	1–1	4–0	1–0
2	(Slovenia) Maribor	6	2	1	3	9	12	−3	7 (Note: Tied on head-to-head points (3). Head-to-head goal difference: Maribor +1, Zulte Waregem −1.)	Advance to knockout phase	2–5	—	0–1	2–1
3	(Belgium) Zulte Waregem	6	2	1	3	4	10	−6	7		0–2	1–3	—	0–0
4	(England) Wigan Athletic	6	1	2	3	6	7	−1	5		1–1	3–1	1–2	—

Source: Soccerway
Notes:

19 September 2013 1	Maribor (Slovenia)	2–5	(Russia) Rubin Kazan	Maribor, Slovenia
19:00 CET	Mejač (yellow card) 13'; Milec 35' (yellow card) 64'; Fajić 73'	Report; Report (in Slovene)	Karadeniz 23'; Marcano 27'; Mubarak (yellow card) 42'; Navas (yellow card) 59'; Eremenko 69'; Kuzmin (yellow card) 74'; Rondón 90'; Ryazantsev 90+4'	Stadium: Ljudski vrt Attendance: 7,500; Referee: Pol van Boekel (Netherlands)

3 October 2013 2	Wigan Athletic (England)	3–1	(Slovenia) Maribor	Wigan, England
21:05 CET	Powell 22' 90+1'; Watson 34'	Report; Report (in Slovene)	Tavares 60'; Mendy (yellow card) 71'	Stadium: DW Stadium; Attendance: 12,753; Referee: Aleksandar Stavrev (Macedonia)

24 October 2013 3	Zulte Waregem (Belgium)	1–3	(Slovenia) Maribor	Bruges, Belgium
21:05 CET	De Fauw 12'; Habibou (yellow card) 51'	Report; Report (in Slovene)	Črnic 21'; Mertelj 34'; Mezga 49'; Milec (yellow card) 54' (yellow card) 57' (red card); Arghus (yellow card) 57'; Filipović (yellow card) 59'; Rajčević (yellow card) 84'	Stadium: Jan Breydel Stadium; Attendance: 5,023; Referee: Stephan Studer, Switzerland

7 November 2013 4	Maribor (Slovenia)	0–1	(Belgium) Zulte Waregem	Maribor, Slovenia
19:00 CET	Viler (yellow card) 29'	Report; Report (in Slovene)	Hazard 29' (pen.); Malanda (yellow card) 74'; Godeau (yellow card) 81'; Bossut (yellow card) 84'	Stadium: Ljudski vrt Attendance: 8,500; Referee: Libor Kovařík, Czech Republic

28 November 2013 5	Rubin Kazan (Russia)	1–1	(Slovenia) Maribor	Kazan, Russia
18:00 CET	Marcano (yellow card) 32'; Natcho 43' (yellow card) 54'; Kulik (yellow card) 76'	Report; Report (in Slovene)	Dervišević (yellow card) 36'; Črnic (yellow card) 78'; Mezga 86'	Stadium: Central Stadium; Attendance: 2,754; Referee: Ivan Kružliak (Slovakia)

12 December 2013 6	Maribor (Slovenia)	2–1	(England) Wigan Athletic	Maribor, Slovenia
19:00 CET	Arghus (yellow card) 40'; Mezga 43'; Tavares (yellow card) 54'; Filipović 59'; Mertelj (yellow card) 65' (red card) 74'; Viler (yellow card) 83'	Report; Report (in Slovene)	Espinoza (yellow card) 19'; McCann (yellow card) 20' (red card) 42'; Gómez 41' (pen.); Rogne (yellow card) 88'	Stadium: Ljudski vrt Attendance: 9,035; Referee: Szymon Marciniak, Poland

Colour key: Green = Maribor win; Yellow = draw; Red = opponents win.

Notes

5. Zulte Waregem played their home matches at Jan Breydel Stadium, Bruges instead of their regular stadium, Regenboogstadion, Waregem.

==== Round of 32 ====
20 February 2014 First leg	Maribor (Slovenia)	2–2	(Spain) Sevilla	Maribor, Slovenia
21:05 CET	Tavares 33'; Bohar (yellow card) 42'; Vršič 81'; Cvijanović (yellow card) 90+1'	Report; Report (in Slovene)	Pareja (yellow card) 44'; Gameiro 47'; Fazio (yellow card) 56' (goal) 72'; Carriço (yellow card) 62'	Stadium: Ljudski vrt Attendance: 12,700; Referee: István Vad (Hungary)

27 February 2014 Second leg	Sevilla (Spain)	2–1 (4–3 agg.)	(Slovenia) Maribor	Seville, Spain
19:00 CET	Reyes 42'; Gameiro 59'	Report; Report (in Slovene)	Mezga (yellow card) 49'; Cvijanović (yellow card) 69'; Filipović (yellow card) 85'; Vršič 90+2'	Stadium: Estadio Ramón Sánchez-Pizjuán; Attendance: 21,562; Referee: Luca Banti (Italy)

Colour key: Green = Maribor win; Yellow = draw; Red = opponents win.

== Friendlies ==
16 June 2013 1	Radlje	0–3	Maribor	Radlje ob Dravi, Slovenia
18:00 CET		Report	Ploj 18'; Kek 32'; Tavares 72'	Referee: Dejan Vivod

19 June 2013 2	Maribor (Slovenia)	3–1	(Bosnia and Herzegovina) Sarajevo	Rogoza, Slovenia
18:00 CET	Dervišević 54'; Tavares 56'; Ploj 73'	Report	Todorović 57'	Stadium: Sports Park; Attendance: 700; Referee: Samo Veselič (Slovenia)

23 June 2013 3	Maribor (Slovenia)	0–0	(Ukraine) Arsenal Kyiv	Beltinci, Slovenia
18:00 CET		Report		Stadium: Beltinci Sports Park; Referee: Bojan Mertik (Slovenia)

27 June 2013 4	Maribor (Slovenia)	1–1	(Romania) Petrolul Ploiești	Maribor, Slovenia
20:00 CET	Mezga 36' (pen.)	Report	Bokila 62' (pen.)	Stadium: Ljudski vrt Attendance: 600; Referee: Bojan Tkalčič (Slovenia)

30 June 2013 5	Maribor (Slovenia)	2–0	(Russia) Lokomotiv Moscow	Maribor, Slovenia
20:00 CET	Tavares 28'; Bohar 41'	Report		Stadium: Ljudski vrt Attendance: 1,200; Referee: Tadej Mežnar (Slovenia)

3 July 2013 6	Maribor (Slovenia)	0–7	(Germany) 1. FC Kaiserslautern	Straß in Steiermark, Austria
19:00 CET		Report	Azaouagh 15'; Wooten 24' 53'; Zoller 63' 73' 89'; Mockenhaupt 78'	Attendance: 1,000

10 September 2013 7	Gerečja vas	1–7	Maribor	Gerečja Vas, Slovenia
17:30 CET	Krajnc 50'	Report	Mendy 21', 43'; Cvijanović 25'; Fajić 55', 85'; Dodlek 63'; Ceppelini 89'	Stadium: Sports Park; Attendance: 400

15 January 2014 8	Kapfenberger SV (Austria)	3–4	(Slovenia) Maribor	Maria Lankowitz, Austria
16:00 CET	Felfernig 6'; Hirschhofer 28'; Osman Ali 39'	Report	Filipović 34'; Mendy 45'; Tavares 53'; Sirk 75'

18 January 2014 9	Maribor	2–1	Veržej	Cven, Slovenia
13:00 CET	Mendy 4'; Sirk 87'	Report	Zahovič 22'

21 January 2014 10	Maribor (Slovenia)	5–0	(Hungary) Haladás	Lendava, Slovenia
14:00 CET	Mezga 14'; Arghus 55'; Zahovič 66' 77'; Tavares 67'	Report		Stadium: Lendava Sports Park (artificial turf)

25 January 2014 11	Maribor	4–0	Beltinci	Lendava, Slovenia
15:00 CET	Mezga 4'; Šuler 39'; Moravac 73'; Fajić 77'	Report		Stadium: Lendava Sports Park (artificial turf)

28 January 2014 12	Maribor (Slovenia)	4–1	(Croatia) Slaven Belupo	Lendava, Slovenia
14:00 CET	Milec 4'; Fajić 10' 34'; Bohar 15'	Report	Rak 31'	Stadium: Lendava Sports Park (artificial turf)

30 January 2014 13	Maribor (Slovenia)	6–0	(Hungary) Ajka	Lendava, Slovenia
12:00 CET	Mendy 43'; Viler 61'; Tavares 69' 73'; Fajić 79' 87'	Report		Stadium: Lendava Sports Park (artificial turf)

4 February 2014 14	Maribor (Slovenia)	3–2	(South Korea) Gyeongnam FC	Belek, Turkey
14:00 CET	Vuklišević 13'; Fajić 61'; Bohar 87'	Report	Song 33'; Bosančić 63' (pen.)	Stadium: Susesi Sport Center

5 February 2014 15	Maribor (Slovenia)	1–3	(Romania) Vaslui	Belek, Turkey
14:00 CET	Črnic 90'	Report	Prahić 54'; Pătulea 68'; Sânmărtean 76'	Stadium: Susesi Sport Center

8 February 2014 16	Maribor (Slovenia)	4–1	(Bulgaria) Litex	Belek, Turkey
14:00 CET	Mendy 10'; Mezga 21'; Vršič 73'; Tavares 87'	Report	Tsvetanov 84'	Stadium: Susesi Sport Center

9 February 2014 17	Maribor (Slovenia)	3–0	(Georgia (country)) Dila Gori	Belek, Turkey
14:30 CET	Mertelj 29'; Zahovič 37'; Hotić 56'	Report		Stadium: Susesi Sport Center

11 February 2014 18	Maribor (Slovenia)	0–4	(Serbia) Partizan	Belek, Turkey
14:00 CET		Report	Škuletić 6', 74'; Mertelj 24' (o.g.); Malbašić 26'	Stadium: Susesi Sport Center

12 February 2014 19	Shakhtar Donetsk (Ukraine)	2–1	(Slovenia) Maribor	Aksu, Turkey
16:30 CET	Fred 27'; Douglas Costa 53'	Report	Tavares 37'	Stadium: Mardan Sports Complex; Referee: German Kravchenko (Russia)

Colour key: Green = Maribor win; Yellow = draw; Red = opponents win.

== Squad statistics ==
=== Key ===
Players

- No. = Shirt number
- Pos. = Playing position
- GK = Goalkeeper
- DF = Defender
- MF = Midfielder
- FW = Forward

Nationality

- = Bosnia and Herzegovina
- = Brazil
- = Croatia
- = France
- (North Macedonia) = Macedonia
- = Serbia
- = Slovenia
- = Uruguay

Competitions

- Apps = Appearances
- = Yellow card
- (red card) = Red card

Key
‡	The player was selected in the official 2013–14 Slovenian PrvaLiga team of the season
#	The player was the top scorer in the respective competition

=== Foreign players ===
Below is the list of foreign players who have made appearances for the club during the 2013–14 season. Players primary citizenship is listed first.

EU Nationals

- (Croatia) (Slovenia) Dejan Mezga
- (France) Jean-Philippe Mendy

EU Nationals (Dual citizenship)

- (Brazil) (Italy) Arghus
- (Brazil) (Slovenia) Marcos Tavares
- (Uruguay) (Italy) Pablo Ceppelini

Non-EU Nationals

- (Bosnia and Herzegovina) Nusmir Fajić
- (North Macedonia) Agim Ibraimi
- (Serbia) Ranko Moravac

=== Appearances and goals ===
Correct as of 25 May 2014, end of the 2013–14 season. Flags indicate national team as has been defined under FIFA eligibility rules. Players may hold more than one non-FIFA nationality. The players squad numbers, playing positions, nationalities and statistics are based solely on match reports in Matches sections above and the official website of NK Maribor and the Slovenian PrvaLiga. Only the players, which made at least one appearance for the first team, are listed.

List of Maribor players, who represented the team during the 2013–14 season, and displaying their statistics during that timeframe
No.	Pos.	Name	Apps	Goals	Apps	Goals	Apps	Goals	Apps	Goals	Apps	Goals	Apps	Goals
No.	Pos.	Name	League		Cup		Supercup		Champions League		Europa League		Total	
1	GK	(Slovenia) Aljaž Cotman	2	0	2	0	—	—	—	—	—	—	4	0
4	DF	(Slovenia) Marko Šuler	10	0	2	0	—	—	—	—	—	—	12	0
5	MF	(Slovenia) Željko Filipović	28	0	4	0	1	0	5	0	8	1	46	1
6	DF	(Slovenia) Martin Milec ‡	24	3	4	2	1	0	6	0	7	1	42	6
7	DF	(Slovenia) Aleš Mejač	15	0	3	0	1	0	5	1	2	0	26	1
8	MF	(Croatia) Dejan Mezga	15	4	3	1	1	1 #	2	0	7	3	28	9
9	FW	(Brazil) Marcos Tavares	34	13	5	0	1	1 #	6	1	6	2	52	17
10	MF	(North Macedonia) Agim Ibraimi	4	2	—	—	1	0	6	0	—	—	11	2
11	FW	(Slovenia) Luka Zahović	11	0	2	1	—	—	—	—	1	0	14	1
14	FW	(France) Jean-Philippe Mendy ‡	29	14	5	3	—	—	4	0	6	0	44	17
15	FW	(Slovenia) Rok Sirk	1	0	—	—	—	—	—	—	—	—	1	0
16	DF	(Slovenia) Damjan Vuklišević	3	0	2	0	—	—	—	—	—	—	5	0
17	FW	(Bosnia and Herzegovina) Nusmir Fajić	31	16	5	2	1	0	5	0	7	1	49	19
20	MF	(Slovenia) Goran Cvijanović	31	6	5	2	1	1 #	6	1	8	0	51	10
21	MF	(Slovenia) Amir Dervišević	16	1	5	0	—	—	2	0	5	0	28	1
22	DF	(Slovenia) Nejc Potokar	4	0	—	—	1	0	3	0	—	—	8	0
22	MF	(Slovenia) Dare Vršič^{[A]}	13	1	2	0	—	—	—	—	2	2	17	3
23	MF	(Slovenia) Dino Hotić	3	0	2	0	—	—	—	—	—	—	5	0
24	DF	(Slovenia) Dejan Trajkovski	8	0	2	0	—	—	—	—	1	0	11	0
25	MF	(Serbia) Ranko Moravac	4	0	2	0	—	—	—	—	2	0	8	0
26	DF	(Slovenia) Aleksander Rajčević ‡	30	0	3	0	1	0	6	0	8	0	48	0
27	FW	(Slovenia) Alen Ploj	1	0	—	—	—	—	—	—	—	—	1	0
28	DF	(Slovenia) Mitja Viler	25	2	1	0	—	—	5	1	7	0	38	3
29	MF	(Slovenia) Timotej Dodlek	8	0	—	—	—	—	—	—	—	—	8	0
30	MF	(Slovenia) Petar Stojanović	7	1	3	1	—	—	—	—	—	—	10	2
32	MF	(Uruguay) Pablo Ceppelini	3	0	—	—	—	—	—	—	—	—	3	0
33	GK	(Slovenia) Jasmin Handanović	33	0	5	0	1	0	6	0	8	0	53	0
36	DF	(Slovenia) Žiga Živko	2	1	—	—	—	—	—	—	—	—	2	1
39	MF	(Slovenia) Damjan Bohar	28	7	6	0	1	0	6	0	7	0	48	7
40	MF	(Slovenia) Sven Dodlek	1	0	—	—	—	—	—	—	—	—	1	0
44	DF	(Brazil) Arghus	20	2	4	0	1	0	5	0	8	0	38	2
45	DF	(Slovenia) Nejc Mevlja	2	0	1	0	—	—	—	—	—	—	3	0
70	MF	(Slovenia) Aleš Mertelj	33	1	4	0	1	0	4	0	7	1	49	2
92	MF	(Slovenia) Matic Črnic	21	3	1	0	—	—	—	—	5	1	27	4

=== Discipline ===
Correct as of 25 May 2014, end of the 2013–14 season. Flags indicate national team as has been defined under FIFA eligibility rules. Players may hold more than one non-FIFA nationality. The players squad numbers, playing positions, nationalities and statistics are based solely on match reports in Matches sections above and the official website of NK Maribor and the Slovenian PrvaLiga. If a player received two yellow cards in a match and was subsequently sent off the numbers count as two yellow cards, one red card.

List of Maribor players, who represented the team during the 2013–14 season, and displaying their statistics during that timeframe
No.	Pos.	Name	Yellow card	Red card	Yellow card	Red card	Yellow card	Red card	Yellow card	Red card	Yellow card	Red card	Yellow card	Red card
No.	Pos.	Name	League		Cup		Supercup		Champions League		Europa League		Total	
1	GK	(Slovenia) Aljaž Cotman	0	0	0	0	—	—	—	—	—	—	0	0
4	DF	(Slovenia) Marko Šuler	1	0	0	0	—	—	—	—	—	—	1	0
5	MF	(Slovenia) Željko Filipović	7	0	1	0	0	0	4	0	2	0	14	0
6	DF	(Slovenia) Martin Milec ‡	5	0	0	0	0	0	1	0	3	1	9	1
7	DF	(Slovenia) Aleš Mejač	1	0	1	0	1	0	0	0	1	0	4	0
8	MF	(Croatia) Dejan Mezga	3	0	0	0	0	0	0	0	1	0	4	0
9	FW	(Brazil) Marcos Tavares	3	0	0	0	0	0	1	0	1	0	5	0
10	MF	(North Macedonia) Agim Ibraimi	0	0	—	—	0	0	0	0	—	—	0	0
11	FW	(Slovenia) Luka Zahović	1^{[B]}	0	0	0	—	—	—	—	0	0	1	0
14	FW	(France) Jean-Philippe Mendy ‡	6	0	1	0	—	—	0	0	1	0	8	0
15	FW	(Slovenia) Rok Sirk	0	0	—	—	—	—	—	—	—	—	—	—
16	DF	(Slovenia) Damjan Vuklišević	3	1	1	0	—	—	—	—	—	—	4	1
17	FW	(Bosnia and Herzegovina) Nusmir Fajić	6	0	2	0	0	0	0	0	0	0	8	0
20	MF	(Slovenia) Goran Cvijanović	3	0	0	0	0	0	1	0	2	0	6	0
21	MF	(Slovenia) Amir Dervišević	0	0	0	0	—	—	0	0	1	0	1	0
22	DF	(Slovenia) Nejc Potokar	0	0	—	—	0	0	0	0	—	—	0	0
22	MF	(Slovenia) Dare Vršič^{[A]}	0	0	0	0	—	—	—	—	0	0	0	0
23	MF	(Slovenia) Dino Hotić	0	0	0	0	—	—	—	—	—	—	0	0
24	DF	(Slovenia) Dejan Trajkovski	2	0	1	0	—	—	—	—	0	0	3	0
25	MF	(Serbia) Ranko Moravac	0	0	0	0	—	—	—	—	0	0	0	0
26	DF	(Slovenia) Aleksander Rajčević ‡	3	0	0	0	0	0	0	0	1	0	4	0
27	FW	(Slovenia) Alen Ploj	0	0	—	—	—	—	—	—	—	—	0	0
28	DF	(Slovenia) Mitja Viler	4	0	0	0	—	—	1	0	2	0	7	0
29	MF	(Slovenia) Timotej Dodlek	1	0	—	—	—	—	—	—	—	—	1	0
30	MF	(Slovenia) Petar Stojanović	0	0	2	0	—	—	—	—	—	—	2	0
32	MF	(Uruguay) Pablo Ceppelini	1	0	—	—	—	—	—	—	—	—	1	0
33	GK	(Slovenia) Jasmin Handanović	0	0	0	0	0	0	1	0	0	0	1	0
36	DF	(Slovenia) Žiga Živko	1	0	—	—	—	—	—	—	—	—	1	0
39	MF	(Slovenia) Damjan Bohar	0	0	1	0	0	0	1	0	1	0	3	0
40	MF	(Slovenia) Sven Dodlek	1	0	—	—	—	—	—	—	—	—	1	0
44	DF	(Brazil) Arghus	11^{[C]}	1	0	0	0	0	0	0	2	0	13	1
45	DF	(Slovenia) Nejc Mevlja	2	1	0	0	—	—	—	—	—	—	2	1
70	MF	(Slovenia) Aleš Mertelj	3	0	0	0	0	0	0	0	2	1	5	1
92	MF	(Slovenia) Matic Črnic	3	0	0	0	—	—	—	—	1	0	4	0

== Transfers and loans ==
=== Manegerial changes ===
Transfer	Date	Name	From / Last	To	Note
Transfer out	4 June 2013	(Slovenia) Darko Milanič	Maribor	Sturm Graz	Released by the club
Transfer in	5 June 2013	(Croatia) Ante Čačić	Radnik Sesvete	Maribor	Released by the club
Transfer out	29 September 2013	(Croatia) Ante Čačić	Maribor	—	Released by the club
Transfer in	30 September 2013	(Slovenia) Ante Šimundža	Aluminij	Maribor	Released by the club.

=== Summer transfer window ===
Transfer	Position	Name	From / last	To	Note
Transfer out	DF	(Slovenia) Jovan Vidović	Maribor	Ravan Baku	Released by the club
Transfer out	FW	(Croatia) Matija Smrekar	Maribor	Free agent	Released by the club
Transfer out	MF	(Croatia) Zoran Lesjak	Maribor	Free agent	Released by the club
Transfer out	DF	(Slovenia) Tilen Lešnik	Maribor	Zavrč	Free transfer
Transfer out	MF	(Slovenia) Semir Spahić	Maribor	SV Wildon	Released by the club
Transfer out	DF	(Slovenia) Mitja Rešek	Maribor	Aluminij	Released by the club
Transfer out	DF	(Slovenia) Aleš Majer	Maribor	Zavrč	Released by the club
Transfer out	GK	(Slovenia) Matej Radan	Maribor	Rudar Velenje	Contract expired
Transfer in	MF	(Slovenia) Damjan Bohar	Mura 05	Maribor	Free transfer
Transfer in	MF	(Slovenia) Amir Dervišević	Krka	Maribor	Free transfer
Transfer in	FW	(France) Jean Philippe Mendy	Koper	Maribor	Free transfer
Transfer out	FW	(Slovenia) Robert Berić	Maribor	Sturm Graz	Undisclosed transfer fee, alleged to be around €1 million
Transfer out	MF	(Slovenia) Rajko Rep	Maribor	Free agent	Released by the club
Loan out	MF	(Slovenia) Petar Stojanović	Maribor	Veržej	Double registration
Loan out	MF	(Serbia) Ranko Moravac	Maribor	Veržej	Double registration
Loan out	MF	(Slovenia) Dino Hotić	Maribor	Veržej	Double registration
Loan out	FW	(Slovenia) Luka Zahović	Maribor	Veržej	Double registration
Loan out	DF	(Slovenia) Damjan Vuklišević	Maribor	Veržej	Double registration
Loan out	DF	(Slovenia) Žiga Živko	Maribor	Veržej	Double registration
Loan out	DF	(Slovenia) Matjaž Kek	Maribor	Veržej	Double registration
Loan out	FW	(Slovenia) Rok Sirk	Maribor	Malečnik	Double registration
Loan out	GK	(Slovenia) Dragan Topić	Maribor	Šenčur	Loaned out
Loan out	MF	(North Macedonia) Agim Ibraimi	Maribor	Cagliari	Loaned until June 2014 in exchange for €800,000 and Pablo Ceppelini heading the other way
Loan in	MF	(Uruguay) Pablo Ceppelini	Cagliari	Maribor	Loaned until June 2014
Transfer in	GK	(Slovenia) Aljaž Cotman	Wolverhampton	Maribor	Free transfer

=== Winter transfer window ===
Transfer	Position	Name	From / last	To	Note
Transfer in	DF	(Slovenia) Marko Šuler	Legia Warsaw	Maribor	Free transfer
Transfer out	DF	(Slovenia) Nejc Potokar	Maribor	AEL Limassol	Undisclosed transfer fee
Transfer out	DF	(Slovenia) Nejc Mevlja	Maribor	Free agent	Free transfer
Loan out	FW	(Slovenia) Alen Ploj	Maribor	Celje	Loaned until June 2014
Transfer in	MF	(Slovenia) Dare Vršič	Austria Wien	Maribor	Free transfer
Transfer out	MF	(Uruguay) Pablo Ceppelini	Maribor	Cagliari	Loan terminated on 27 March 2014

== Footnotes ==
- ^{A} After signing with Maribor, Dare Vršič selected the number 22 for his jersey, which was the number previously worn by Nejc Potokar who left the club during the winter break. However, because Potokar was registered for the UEFA competitions in the first part of the season, Vršič was unable to wear the number and was registered with the number two in the knockout phase of the 2013–14 UEFA Europa League.
- ^{B} During a league match between Maribor and Koper, played on 8 March 2014, Zahović received a yellow card in the first minute of the second half stoppage time, due to excessive goal celebration. At the time of the booking, Zahović was at the players bench, however, even though he did not actually play during the match, the yellow card is nevertheless counted towards the official statistics.
- ^{C} During a league match between Koper and Maribor, played on 28 September 2013, Arghus received a yellow card in the fifth minute of the second half stoppage time, due to protests. At the time of the booking, Arghus was at the players bench, however, even though he did not actually play during the match, the yellow card is nevertheless counted towards the official statistics.

== See also ==
- List of NK Maribor seasons
