= 2013 Slovenian Football Cup final =

2013 Slovenian Cup final
- The match took place at Bonifika Stadium.
- Event: 2012–13 Slovenian Football Cup
Maribor	Celje
1	0
- Date: 29 May 2013
- Venue: Bonifika, Koper
- Referee: Matej Jug
- Attendance: 1,500

The 2013 Slovenian Football Cup final was the final match of the 2012–13 Slovenian Football Cup, the 22nd edition of the Slovenian Football Cup, the top knockout tournament of Slovenian football and the second most important football competition in the country after the Slovenian PrvaLiga championship. The match was played on 29 May 2013 at Bonifika Stadium in Koper.

== Venue ==
The match was played at Bonifika Stadium, a 4,047 all-seater stadium in Koper, which replaced Arena Petrol, Ljudski vrt and Stožice Stadium, where the previous eight finals were held. In addition, this was the first Slovenian cup final held in the Slovene Riviera.

== Background ==
The final was played between the two Styrian teams, Maribor and Celje, both competing in the Slovenian PrvaLiga. This was the second time Maribor and Celje met in the cup final, having faced each other in the final during the 2011–12 edition, where Maribor won their seventh cup title after a penalty shoot-out. Celje previously competed in six finals, but managed to win only once, when they defeated Gorica in the 2004–05 edition.

== Road to the final ==
Note: In all results below, the score of the finalist is given first.

Maribor				Round	Celje			
Opponent	Result			Knockout phase	Opponent	Result		
N/A	N/A			First round	N/A	N/A		
Zavrč	2–0 (A)			Round of 16	Brda	3–0 (A)		
Opponent	Agg.	1st leg	2nd leg	Knockout phase	Opponent	Agg.	1st leg	2nd leg
Olimpija	3–2	3–1 (A)	0–1 (H)	Quarter-finals	Dravinja	3–0	2–0 (H)	1–0 (A)
Triglav Kranj	5–2	2–2 (A)	3–0 (H)	Semi-finals	Aluminij	1–1 (a)	1–1 (A)	0–0 (H)

== Match details ==
29 May 2013
20:45 CEST

Maribor	1–0	Celje
Ibraimi 44'	Report

Bonifika, Koper
Attendance: 1,500
Referee: Matej Jug

Maribor	Celje

Maribor:
GK	33	(Slovenia) Jasmin Handanović
RB	6	(Slovenia) Martin Milec
CB	22	(Slovenia) Nejc Potokar
CB	44	(Brazil) Arghus
LB	28	(Slovenia) Mitja Viler
RM	10	(North Macedonia) Agim Ibraimi
CM	70	(Slovenia) Aleš Mertelj
CM	20	(Slovenia) Goran Cvijanović	(substituted off) 79'
LM	8	(Croatia) Dejan Mezga
FW	9	(Brazil) Marcos Tavares (c)
FW	32	(Slovenia) Robert Berić
Substitutes:
GK	12	(Slovenia) Marko Pridigar
DF	24	(Slovenia) Dejan Trajkovski
DF	45	(Slovenia) Nejc Mevlja
MF	5	(Slovenia) Željko Filipović	(substituted in) 79'
MF	25	(Serbia) Ranko Moravac
MF	29	(Slovenia) Timotej Dodlek
FW	11	(Slovenia) Luka Zahović
Manager:
(Slovenia) Darko Milanič

Celje:
GK	12	(Slovenia) Matic Kotnik
RB	16	(Slovenia) Miha Korošec
CB	5	(Slovenia) Marko Krajcer
CB	24	(Slovenia) Matic Žitko
LB	18	(Slovenia) Sebastjan Gobec (c)
DM	4	(Slovenia) Blaž Vrhovec	(yellow card) 29'
DM	28	(Slovenia) Miha Zajc
CM	70	(Serbia) Alexander Srdić	(substituted off) 61'
CM	7	(Slovenia) Benjamin Verbič	(yellow card) 82'
CM	9	(Slovenia) Gregor Bajde	(substituted off) 76'
FW	29	(Slovenia) Andraž Žurej
Substitutes:
GK	1	(Slovenia) Amel Mujčinovič
DF	23	(Slovenia) Tadej Gaber
DF	30	(Slovenia) Tadej Vidmajer
MF	19	(Slovenia) Nejc Plesec	(substituted in) 61' (yellow card) 86'
MF	20	(Slovenia) Klemen Medved
MF	26	(Slovenia) David Tomažič Šeruga
FW	13	(Serbia) Aleksandar Bajić	(substituted in) 76'
Manager:
(Slovenia) Miloš Rus

Assistant referees:
Primož Arhar
Marko Stančin
Fourth official:
Darko Čeferin
Delegate:
Leopold Roglič

2012–13 Slovenian Cup winners
Maribor
8th title

== See also ==
- 2012–13 Slovenian Football Cup
- 2012–13 Slovenian PrvaLiga
- 2012 Slovenian Supercup
