= Dino Hotić =

Bosnian footballer (born 1995)

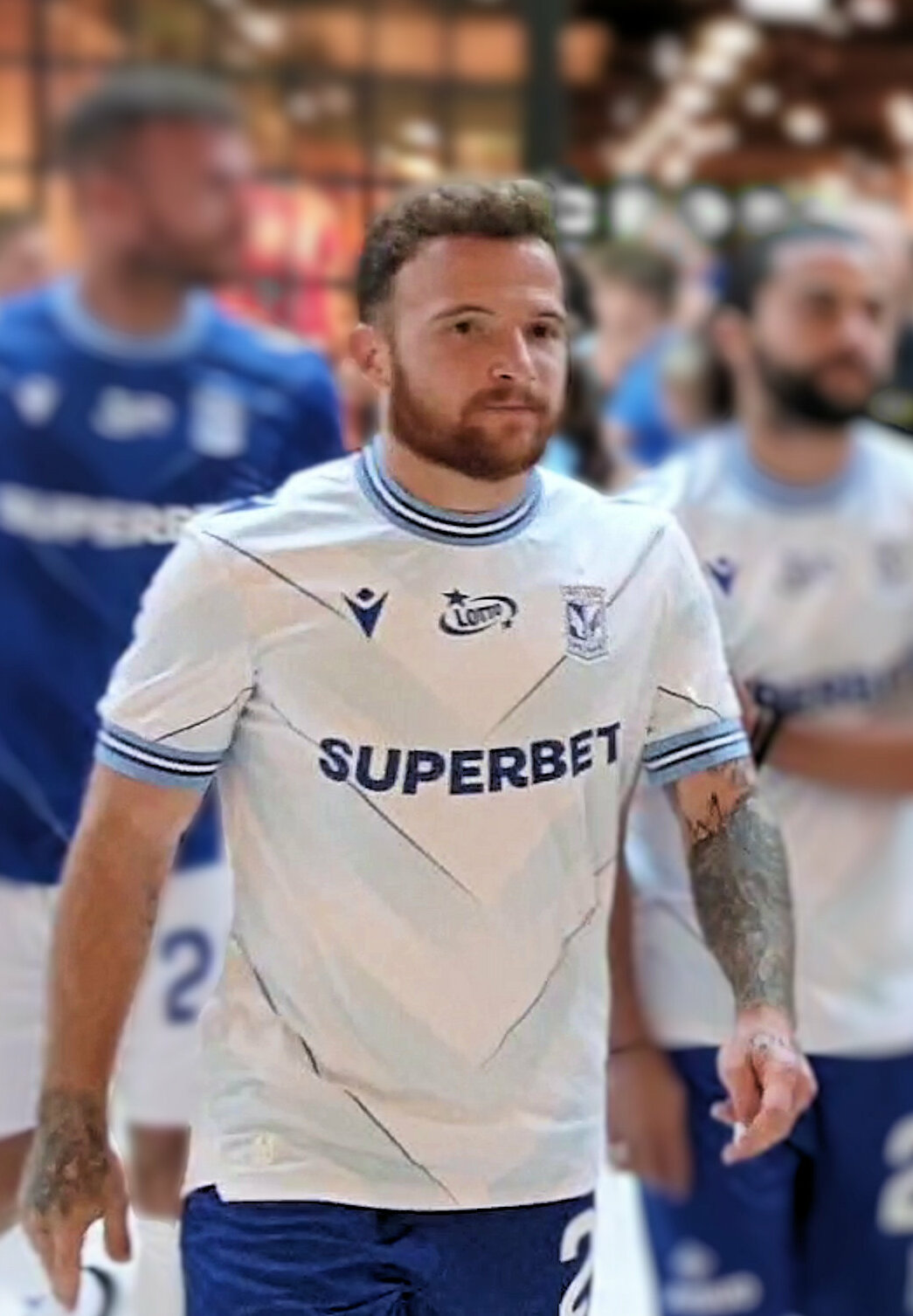
- Hotić with Lech Poznań in 2023

Personal information
- Date of birth: 26 July 1995 (age 31)
- Place of birth: Ljubljana, Slovenia
- Height: 1.68 m (5 ft 6 in)
- Positions: Attacking midfielder; winger

Team information
- Current team: Iğdır
- Number: 23

Youth career
- 2005–2008: Domžale
- 2008–2011: Bravo
- 2011–2013: Maribor

Senior career*
Years	Team	Apps	(Gls)
2013–2020	Maribor	120	(19)
2013–2014	→ Veržej (loan)	18	(9)
2014–2015	Maribor B	27	(4)
2016	→ Krško (loan)	13	(1)
2020–2023	Cercle Brugge	112	(17)
2023–2025	Lech Poznań	43	(5)
2025–2026	Ajman Club	14	(0)
2026	Bodrum	9	(5)
2026–	Iğdır	0	(0)

International career
2012	Slovenia U17 (Note: Official competitive UEFA matches only.)	3	(0)
2013	Slovenia U19	3	(0)
2014–2016	Slovenia U21	14	(4)
2019	Slovenia B	1	(0)
2019–2022	Bosnia and Herzegovina	4	(0)
- * Club domestic league appearances and goals as of 14 July 2026

Dino Hotić (Bosnian pronunciation: [dîːno xǒtitɕ]; born 26 July 1995) is a professional footballer who plays as an attacking midfielder for TFF 1. Lig club Iğdır. Born in Slovenia, he represented the Bosnia and Herzegovina national team internationally.

Hotić started his professional career at Maribor, who loaned him to Veržej in 2013 and to Krško in 2016. In 2020, he joined Cercle Brugge. Three years later, he moved to Polish club Lech Poznań.

A former Slovenian youth international, Hotić made his senior international debut for Bosnia and Herzegovina in 2019.

== Club career ==
=== Early career ===
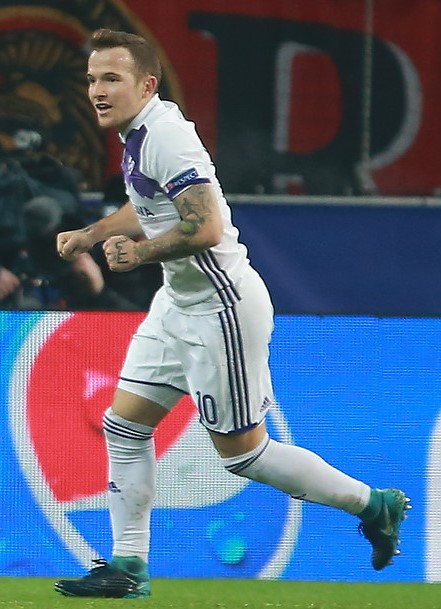
Hotić playing for Maribor in 2017

Hotić started playing football at local club Domžale and later at Bravo, before joining Maribor's youth academy in 2011.

In July 2013, he was sent on a season-long loan to Veržej. In January 2016, he was loaned to Krško until the end of season.

=== Cercle Brugge ===
In January 2020, Hotić was transferred to Belgian outfit Cercle Brugge for an undisclosed fee, reported to be around €1.2 million. He made his official debut for the team on 19 January against Antwerp. On 8 February, he scored his first goal for Cercle Brugge in a triumph over Mechelen.

=== Lech Poznań ===
On 12 July 2023, Hotić moved on a free transfer to Polish Ekstraklasa side Lech Poznań, signing a three-year deal. Marred by injuries throughout his first season in Poznań, he scored five times and provided one assist during Lech's title-winning 2024–25 campaign.

=== Ajman Club ===
On 16 June 2025, Hotić signed with Emirati club Ajman Club.

== International career ==
Despite representing Slovenia at all youth levels, Hotić decided to play for Bosnia and Herzegovina at senior level as his parents are of Bosnian descent from Ključ.

In October 2019, his request to change sports citizenship from Slovenian to Bosnian was approved by FIFA. Later that month, he received his first senior call-up, for the UEFA Euro 2020 qualifying matches against Italy and Liechtenstein. He debuted against the latter on 18 November.

== Career statistics ==
=== Club ===
As of match played 15 May 2026

Appearances and goals by club, season and competition
Club	Season	League			National cup (Note: Includes Slovenian Cup, Belgian Cup, Polish Cup, UAE President's Cup)		Other		Total	
Club	Season	Division	Apps	Goals	Apps	Goals	Apps	Goals	Apps	Goals
Maribor	2012–13	Slovenian PrvaLiga	3	0	0	0	0	0	3	0
Maribor	2013–14	Slovenian PrvaLiga	3	0	2	0	0	0	5	0
Maribor	2014–15	Slovenian PrvaLiga	4	0	1	0	0	0	5	0
Maribor	2015–16	Slovenian PrvaLiga	4	0	1	0	0	0	5	0
Maribor	2016–17	Slovenian PrvaLiga	28	2	3	1	3 (Note: Appearances in UEFA Europa League)	0	34	3
Maribor	2017–18	Slovenian PrvaLiga	30	4	2	0	10 (Note: Appearances in UEFA Champions League)	0	42	4
Maribor	2018–19	Slovenian PrvaLiga	29	9	5	1	5	0	39	10
Maribor	2019–20	Slovenian PrvaLiga	19	4	0	0	7 (Note: Six appearances and one goal in UEFA Champions League, one appearance in UEFA Europa League)	1	26	5
Maribor	Total		120	19	14	2	25	1	159	22
Veržej (loan)	2013–14	Slovenian Second League	18	9	0	0	—		18	9
Krško (loan)	2015–16	Slovenian PrvaLiga	13	1	—		—		13	1
Cercle Brugge	2019–20	Belgian First Division A	7	1	—		—		7	1
Cercle Brugge	2020–21	Belgian First Division A	32	4	2	1	—		34	5
Cercle Brugge	2021–22	Belgian First Division A	33	7	2	0	—		35	7
Cercle Brugge	2022–23	Belgian First Division A	40	5	2	0	—		42	5
Cercle Brugge	Total		112	17	6	1	0	0	118	18
Lech Poznań	2023–24	Ekstraklasa	16	0	2	0	4 (Note: Appearances in UEFA Europa Conference League)	1	22	1
Lech Poznań	2024–25	Ekstraklasa	27	5	0	0	—		27	5
Lech Poznań	Total		43	5	2	0	4	1	49	6
Ajman Club	2025–26	UAE Pro League	14	0	1	0	2 (Note: Appearances in UAE League Cup)	1	17	1
Bodrum	2025–26	TFF 1. Lig	9	5	0	0	3 (Note: Appearances in TFF 1. Lig promotion play-offs)	0	12	5
Career total			329	56	23	3	34	3	386	62

=== International ===
Appearances and goals by national team and year
National team	Year	Apps	Goals
Bosnia and Herzegovina
Bosnia and Herzegovina	2019	1	0
Bosnia and Herzegovina	2020	1	0
Bosnia and Herzegovina	2021	0	0
Bosnia and Herzegovina	2022	2	0
Total		4	0

== Honours ==
Maribor

- Slovenian PrvaLiga: 2012–13, 2013–14, 2014–15, 2016–17, 2018–19
- Slovenian Cup: 2012–13

Lech Poznań

- Ekstraklasa: 2024–25
