= Matic Črnic =

Slovenian footballer (born 1992)

Personal information
- Date of birth: 12 June 1992 (age 34)
- Place of birth: Maribor, Slovenia
- Height: 1.74 m (5 ft 9 in)
- Position: Winger

Team information
- Current team: Malečnik

Youth career
- –2011: Maribor

Senior career*
Years	Team	Apps	(Gls)
2009–2014	Maribor	55	(5)
2012	→ Dravinja (loan)	9	(2)
2013	→ Aluminij (loan)	14	(1)
2014	Maribor B	11	(7)
2015–2016	Domžale	44	(10)
2016–2018	Rijeka	28	(3)
2018–2020	Olimpija Ljubljana	19	(3)
2021	Gorica	2	(0)
2022	TUS Heiligenkreuz	13	(1)
2022–2023	SV Wildon	17	(3)
2023–2024	SV Rottenmann	12	(1)
2024	Roho		
2025–	Malečnik		

International career
2008–2009	Slovenia U17 (Note: Official competitive UEFA matches only.)	6	(0)
2009	Slovenia U19	3	(0)
2013–2014	Slovenia U21	10	(0)
2016	Slovenia	2	(0)
2019	Slovenia B	1	(0)
- * Club domestic league appearances and goals

Matic Črnic (born 12 June 1992) is a Slovenian footballer who plays as a midfielder for Malečnik.

== Club career ==
In August 2016, Črnic joined Rijeka in Croatia on a three-year deal. Following two years with the club, in June 2018, Črnic was signed by Olimpija Ljubljana.

== International career ==
Črnic made his debut for Slovenia in a March 2016 friendly match away against Northern Ireland, coming on as a 75th-minute substitute for Roman Bezjak.

== Honours ==
Maribor

- Slovenian Championship: 2008–09, 2010–11, 2011–12, 2013–14
- Slovenian Cup: 2009–10, 2011–12
- Slovenian Supercup: 2009, 2012, 2013, 2014

Rijeka

- Croatian Championship: 2016–17
- Croatian Cup: 2016–17

Olimpija Ljubljana

- Slovenian Cup: 2018–19
