= Damjan Vuklišević =

Slovenian footballer (born 1995)

Personal information
- Date of birth: 28 June 1995 (age 31)
- Height: 1.93 m (6 ft 4 in)
- Position: Defender

Team information
- Current team: Celje
- Number: 3

Youth career
- –2009: Slovan
- 2009–2011: Interblock
- 2011–2014: Maribor

Senior career*
Years	Team	Apps	(Gls)
2013–2017	Maribor	6	(0)
2013–2014	→ Veržej (loan)	12	(1)
2014–2015	Maribor B	30	(5)
2016–2017	→ Krško (loan)	38	(2)
2017–2018	Rudar Velenje	17	(0)
2018–2019	Slovan Liberec	11	(0)
2019–2022	Domžale	56	(7)
2022–	Celje	53	(6)

International career
2012	Slovenia U17 (Note: Official competitive UEFA matches only.)	2	(0)
2013	Slovenia U19	3	(0)
- * Club domestic league appearances and goals as of 26 March 2024

Damjan Vuklišević (born 28 June 1995) is a Slovenian footballer who plays as a defender for Slovenian PrvaLiga side Celje.

== Honours ==
Maribor

- Slovenian PrvaLiga: 2013–14, 2014–15
- Slovenian Supercup: 2013, 2014

Celje

- Slovenian PrvaLiga: 2023–24, 2025–26
