= Snoj =

Snoj is a surname of Slovene origin. Notable people with the surname include:

- Franc Snoj (1902-1962), Slovenian politician and economist
- Jože Snoj (1934–2021), Slovenian poet, novelist, journalist and essayist
- Luka Snoj (born 1990), Slovenian professional 3x3 basketball player
- Marko Snoj (born 1959), Slovenian Indo-Europeanist, Slavist, Albanologist, lexicographer, and etymologist
- Niko Snoj (born 1990), Slovenian footballer
- Ivan Snoj (1923-1994), Croatian handball coach and international referee
