= Alen Ploj =

Slovenian football forward (born 1992)

Personal information
- Date of birth: 30 June 1992 (age 34)
- Place of birth: Lenart, Slovenia
- Height: 1.83 m (6 ft 0 in)
- Position: Forward

Team information
- Current team: Lenart

Youth career
- Lenart
- –2007: Jarenina
- 2007–2011: Maribor

Senior career*
Years	Team	Apps	(Gls)
2011–2015	Maribor	17	(7)
2011–2012	→ Aluminij (loan)	23	(8)
2013	→ Mura 05 (loan)	15	(1)
2014	→ Celje (loan)	9	(0)
2014–2015	Maribor B	24	(20)
2015–2016	ViOn Zlaté Moravce	6	(1)
2016	Bełchatów	12	(4)
2016–2017	Bytovia Bytów	16	(3)
2017–2018	Wisła Puławy	28	(4)
2018–2020	Nafta 1903	45	(12)
2020–2021	SAK Klagenfurt	13	(7)
2021–2022	Rogaška	23	(7)
2022	Drava Ptuj	12	(1)
2022	FC Gamlitz	14	(2)
2023–	Lenart		

International career
2010	Slovenia U19 (Note: Official competitive UEFA matches only.)	3	(0)
2013	Slovenia U21	1	(0)
- * Club domestic league appearances and goals

Alen Ploj (born 30 June 1992) is a Slovenian footballer who plays as a forward for Lenart.

== Club career ==
Ploj started his career at local side Lenart, and later played youth football with Jarenina. In 2007, he joined Maribor, where he signed his first professional contract with the club in early 2011. Ploj made his debut in the Slovenian PrvaLiga on 16 March 2011 against Nafta Lendava. During that season he made another league appearance for the club, in the final round of the 2010–11 Slovenian PrvaLiga season against Domžale, when he also scored his first top division goal. In the 2011–12 season, Ploj was loaned to the Slovenian Second League side Aluminij. He scored a hat-trick for Aluminij in the fourth matchday of the Second League on 27 August 2011, in a 5–1 win over Dravinja.

== Personal life ==
Ploj is a native of Lenart, a small town in the northeastern Slovenia.

== Honours ==
Maribor

- Slovenian PrvaLiga: 2010–11, 2012–13, 2013–14
- Slovenian Supercup: 2012, 2013

Aluminij

- Slovenian Second League: 2011–12

Maribor B

- Slovenian Third League: 2014–15
