= 2014 Slovenian Football Cup final =

2014 Slovenian Cup final
- Bonifika Stadium
- Event: 2013–14 Slovenian Football Cup
Maribor	Gorica
0	2
- Date: 21 May 2014
- Venue: Bonifika, Koper
- Man of the Match: Francesco Finocchio (Gorica)
- Referee: Damir Skomina
- Attendance: 3,500
- Weather: Clear; 20 °C (68 °F)

The 2014 Slovenian Cup final was the final match of the 2013–14 Slovenian Cup, the 23rd edition of the Slovenian Football Cup, the top knockout tournament of Slovenian football and the second most important football competition in the country after the Slovenian PrvaLiga championship. The match was played on Wednesday, 21 May 2014 at the Bonifika Stadium in Koper, Slovenia and was won by Gorica who defeated Maribor with the score 2–0. This was the third cup title for the side from Nova Gorica and the first trophy they have won since the 2005–06 season when they were league champions.

== Venue ==
The match was played at the Bonifika Stadium, a 4,047 all-seater stadium in Koper, where the previous final was held. The stadium is part of Bonifika sports complex, together with a smaller athletics stadium, indoor hall and an indoor swimming pool. The stadium was originally built in 1947 and was completely renovated in 2010.

== Background ==
The final was played between Maribor and Gorica. Maribor were the defending champions, they have won the 2012–13 cup edition. In addition, Maribor is the most successful team in history of the competition, having won eight titles and were runners-up on three occasions. Gorica have won the title two times, the last time they were successful was in the 2001–02 season, and were runners-up during the 2004–05 season.

== Road to the final ==
Note: In all results below, the score of the finalist is given first.

Maribor				Round	Gorica			
Opponent	Result			Knockout phase	Opponent	Result		
N/A	N/A			First round	Slatina	2–0 (A)		
Radomlje	4–1 (A)			Round of 16	Dravograd	4–0 (A)		
Opponent	Agg.	1st leg	2nd leg	Knockout phase	Opponent	Agg.	1st leg	2nd leg
Šenčur	6–3	5–2 (A)	1–1 (H)	Quarter-finals	Aluminij	4–1	1–0 (A)	3–1 (H)
Olimpija	2–1	1–0 (H)	1–1 (A)	Semi-finals	Rudar Velenje	3–1	1–0 (A)	2–1 (H)

== Match details ==
21 May 2014
20:30 CEST

Maribor	0–2	Gorica
	Report	Finocchio 78', 85'

Bonifika, Koper
Attendance: 3,500
Referee: Damir Skomina

Maribor	Gorica

2013–14 Slovenian Cup
Winners
Gorica
3rd title

== See also ==
- 2013–14 Slovenian Cup
- 2013–14 Slovenian PrvaLiga
- 2013 Slovenian Supercup
