= Žiga Živko =

Slovenian footballer

Personal information
- Date of birth: 21 July 1995 (age 31)
- Place of birth: Slovenia
- Height: 1.89 m (6 ft 2 in)
- Position: Defender

Team information
- Current team: Lenart

Youth career
- –2011: Jarenina
- 2011–2014: Maribor

Senior career*
Years	Team	Apps	(Gls)
2014–2017	Maribor	3	(1)
2013–2014	→ Veržej (loan)	16	(1)
2014–2017	Maribor B	37	(7)
2016	→ Veržej (loan)	11	(0)
2017–2022	Nafta 1903	84	(3)
2020	→ Zalaegerszeg (loan)	4	(0)
2023–2024	TuS Rein	16	(1)
2023	TuS Rein II	1	(0)
2024–	Lenart	0	(0)

International career
2010	Slovenia U16	1	(0)
- * Club domestic league appearances and goals as of 25 January 2024

Žiga Živko (born 21 July 1995) is a Slovenian footballer who plays as a defender for Lenart.

== Honours ==
Maribor

- Slovenian Championship: 2013–14, 2014–15
- Slovenian Supercup: 2013, 2014
