= Aljaž Cotman =

Slovenian footballer (born 1994)

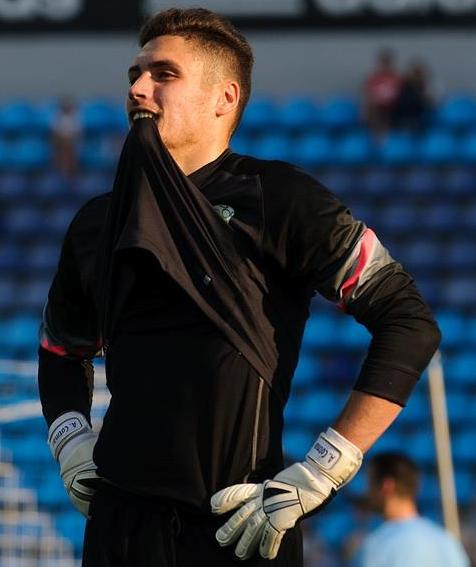

Personal information
- Date of birth: 26 April 1994 (age 32)
- Place of birth: Kranj, Slovenia
- Height: 1.93 m (6 ft 4 in)
- Position: Goalkeeper

Team information
- Current team: Velesovo Cerklje

Youth career
- Visoko
- Triglav Kranj
- 2010–2012: Wolverhampton Wanderers

Senior career*
Years	Team	Apps	(Gls)
2012–2013	Wolverhampton Wanderers	0	(0)
2013–2021	Maribor	6	(0)
2014–2017	Maribor B	49	(0)
2020–2021	→ Aluminij (loan)	0	(0)
2021–2022	Nafta 1903	12	(0)
2022–2025	SV Donau Klagenfurt	86	(0)
2026–	Velesovo Cerklje	0	(0)

International career
2010	Slovenia U17 (Note: Official competitive UEFA matches only.)	2	(0)
2012	Slovenia U19	3	(0)
2013–2015	Slovenia U21	5	(0)
- * Club domestic league appearances and goals as of 1 September 2026

Aljaž Cotman (born 26 April 1994) is a Slovenian footballer who plays as a goalkeeper for Velesovo Cerklje. He was a member of the Slovenia youth national selections.

== Club career ==
Cotman started his career in his hometown club Triglav from Kranj. He joined the youth ranks of English Premier League side Wolverhampton Wanderers in 2010, signing a professional deal in 2012. However, he did not make an appearance for the senior team before his contract expired and he returned to his homeland.

On 21 October 2013, he joined the Slovenian champions Maribor. He made his debut for the club in a cup match against Šenčur on 13 November 2013, where his team won 5–2. He made his league debut in the Slovenian PrvaLiga on 17 May 2014 in a match against Gorica.

== International career ==
Cotman was capped for Slovenia at all youth levels from under-15 to under-21.
