= Aleksander Rajčević =

Slovenian footballer

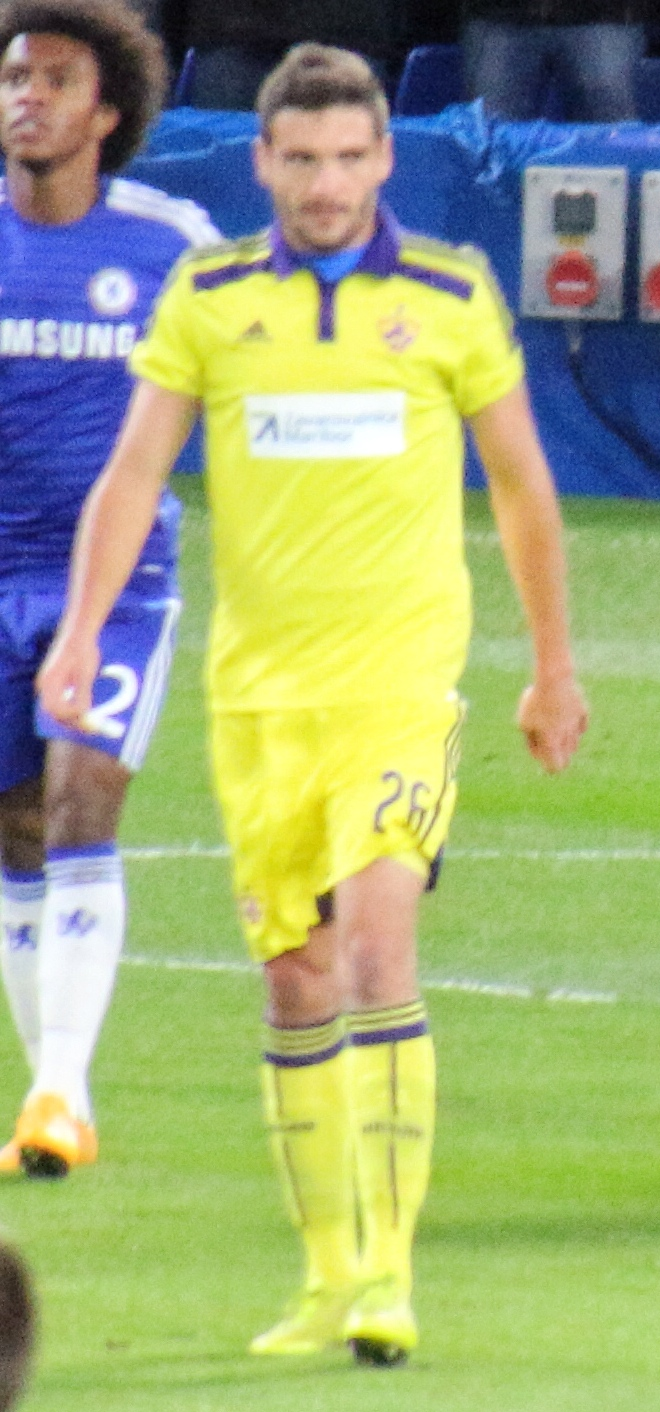
- Rajčević with Maribor in 2014

Personal information
- Date of birth: 17 November 1986 (age 39)
- Place of birth: Koper, SFR Yugoslavia
- Height: 1.85 m (6 ft 1 in)
- Position: Defender

Team information
- Current team: Kras Repen

Youth career
- –2005: Koper

Senior career*
Years	Team	Apps	(Gls)
2005–2010	Koper	114	(9)
2005	→ Izola (loan)	5	(0)
2005–2007	→ Bonifika (loan)	35	(5)
2010–2020	Maribor	205	(6)
2016	Maribor B	3	(1)
2020–2022	Koper	57	(1)
2023–	Kras Repen		

International career
2006	Slovenia U20	4	(0)
2006–2008	Slovenia U21	9	(0)
2013	Slovenia	1	(0)
- * Club domestic league appearances and goals as of 4 January 2023

Aleksander Rajčević (born 17 November 1986) is a Slovenian footballer who plays as a defender for Italian club Kras Repen.

In 2010, Rajčević was named in Slovenia's preliminary 30-man squad for the 2010 FIFA World Cup in South Africa, but failed to make it to the final 23. He was capped once by Slovenia, against Bosnia and Herzegovina in a friendly match in February 2013.

== Honours ==
Koper

- Slovenian PrvaLiga: 2009–10
- Slovenian Cup: 2005–06, 2006–07, 2021–22

Maribor

- Slovenian PrvaLiga: 2010–11, 2011–12, 2012–13, 2013–14, 2014–15, 2016–17, 2018–19
- Slovenian Cup: 2011–12, 2012–13, 2015–16
- Slovenian Supercup: 2012, 2013, 2014
