= Klemen Medved =

Slovenian football midfielder (born 1988)

Personal information
- Full name: Klemen Medved
- Date of birth: 10 November 1988 (age 37)
- Place of birth: SFR Yugoslavia
- Height: 1.78 m (5 ft 10 in)
- Positions: Midfielder; left-back

Youth career
- Dogoše
- –2007: Maribor

Senior career*
Years	Team	Apps	(Gls)
2006–2009	Maribor	12	(0)
2007–2008	→ Aluminij (loan)	22	(4)
2008–2009	→ Nafta Lendava (loan)	14	(0)
2009–2010	Drava Ptuj	23	(0)
2010–2013	Celje	88	(2)
2013	Krka	6	(0)
2014	Aluminij	10	(2)
2014–2015	USV Allerheiligen	11	(0)
2015–2020	SV Gralla	102	(11)

International career
2004	Slovenia U16	2	(0)
2004	Slovenia U17	3	(0)
2006	Slovenia U18	3	(0)
2006	Slovenia U19	4	(1)
2008–2009	Slovenia U20	6	(0)
2009	Slovenia U21	1	(0)
- * Club domestic league appearances and goals as of 1 October 2019

Klemen Medved (born 10 November 1988) is a Slovenian football midfielder who plays for SV Gralla.
