= Ante Čačić =

Croatian football manager

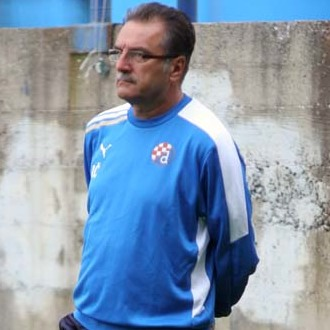
- Čačić as manager of Dinamo Zagreb in 2011

Personal information
- Date of birth: 29 September 1953 (age 73)
- Place of birth: Zagreb, PR Croatia, FPR Yugoslavia

Managerial career
- Years: Team
- 1986–1987: Prigorje Markuševec
- 1988–1989: TPK
- 1989–1992: Zadar
- 1992–1993: Dubrava
- 1993–1995: Inter Zaprešić
- 1994–1998: Croatia U21 (assistant)
- 1995–1996: Osijek
- 1996–1997: Zadar
- 1998: Slaven Belupo
- 1998–2000: Croatia Sesvete
- 2002–2003: Inter Zaprešić
- 2005–2006: Libya (assistant)
- 2005: Libya U23
- 2006–2007: Kamen Ingrad
- 2007: Inter Zaprešić
- 2011: Lokomotiva Zagreb
- 2011–2012: Dinamo Zagreb
- 2013: Radnik Sesvete
- 2013: Maribor
- 2014–2015: Slaven Belupo
- 2015: Lokomotiva Zagreb
- 2015–2017: Croatia
- 2019–2020: Pyramids FC
- 2022–2023: Dinamo Zagreb
Medal record
Libya
Mediterranean Games
Third place	2005 Almería	U20

Ante Čačić (Croatian pronunciation: [ǎːnte tʃâtʃitɕ]; born 29 September 1953) is a Croatian professional football manager who was most recently manager of Croatian Football League club Dinamo Zagreb.

Čačić graduated from the Faculty of Physical Education at the University of Zagreb. He was one of the first ten football coaches in Croatia to get the UEFA Pro Licence.

== Managerial career ==
During his career, Čačić successfully achieved promotion to the top division with Inter Zaprešić and Dubrava. He also managed Zadar, Osijek, Slaven Belupo, Kamen Ingrad, Croatia Sesvete and Lokomotiva Zagreb.

=== Inter Zaprešić ===
In the 2002–03 season, Čačić was at the helm of Inter Zaprešić in the south division in Druga HNL. In March 2003, he resigned after losing to the first-placed team Uljanik, leaving Inter at the second place in the table and five points behind the leaders. He was replaced with Ilija Lončarević, who achieved promotion to Prva HNL.

=== Libya ===
When Lončarević was appointed manager of the Libya national football team, he named Čačić as his assistant. During his time at Libya, he was chosen to lead their under-20 squad at the 2005 Mediterranean Games held in Spain. After losing to the hosts in the semi-finals, they won the bronze medal after defeating Morocco in the penalty shoot-out.

=== Kamen Ingrad ===
In June 2006, Čačić returned to Croatia and was appointed manager of Kamen Ingrad, but after only three months he terminated his contract.

=== Return to Inter Zaprešić ===
In October 2006, he again took over the helm of Inter Zaprešić after they sacked Srećko Bogdan. Čačić led Inter to the first place in the 2006–07 Druga HNL and the team was promoted to Prva HNL. After a disappointing start in the following season, he was sacked in August 2007.

=== Lokomotiva ===
In October 2011, Čačić was appointed manager of Lokomotiva Zagreb. They finished in the sixth place at the winter break, undefeated in four games led by Čačić.

=== Dinamo Zagreb ===
On 23 December 2011, it was announced that Čačić had signed a one-and-a-half-year contract with Dinamo Zagreb. He was sacked from Dinamo in November 2012.

=== Radnik Sesvete ===
Čačić was without assignment until April 2013 when he took over as manager of Radnik Sesvete.

=== Maribor ===
Čačić left Radnik Sesvete in early June 2013, when he accepted an offer from Slovenian champions Maribor.

=== Slaven Belupo ===
Čačić became manager of Slaven Belupo on 4 November 2014 and the club finished sixth in his only season at the helm of the club.

=== Return to Lokomotiva ===
Čačić again became manager of Lokomotiva on 3 June 2015 and was with the club for only three months before being selected as head coach of the Croatia national football team.

=== Croatia ===
==== Euro 2016: Qualifying and finals ====
Following the sacking of Niko Kovač, which was caused due to a poor run in the Euro 2016 qualifying, Ante Čačić was appointed as head coach of the Croatia national team. His appointment was very controversial and left fans of the national team in shock. Croatia finished second in their qualifying group, securing a place in the group stages of Euro 2016 in France. Croatia enjoyed a memorable group stage run, topping their group after beating European champions Spain by a scoreline of 2–1 on 21 June, despite key-player Luka Modrić not playing due to injury problems. However, Croatian fans had earlier sparked controversy during a match against the Czech Republic, which finished 2–2, when flares were lit at the near end of the match. After beating Spain, Croatia were tipped as one of the favorites to win the tournament, but they were knocked out by future winners Portugal in the round of sixteen.

Čačić was voted as the 7th Best National Team Coach by the International Federation of Football History & Statistics.

==== FIFA World Cup 2018: Qualifying and sacking ====
Čačić took Croatia to a strong start in their qualifying campaign, with Croatia leading their group and remaining undefeated. However, defeats to Iceland and Turkey, as well as a draw to Finland threatened their progression and caused a public outcry against Čačić, who was criticized for his poor team selection, decreasing player morale and losing support from players and fans. Čačić was also criticized by former Croatia head coach Miroslav Blažević.

He was sacked on 7 October 2017, with Zlatko Dalić being named as his successor.

=== Pyramids ===
On 27 December 2019, he was appointed manager of Egyptian club Pyramids FC. He led his team to reach the 2020 CAF Confederation Cup Final, which they lost 0–1 against RS Berkane. Later on, Pyramids decided to find a new coach, after they finished third in the 2019–20 Egyptian Premier League.

=== Return to Dinamo Zagreb ===
On 21 April 2022, Čačić became the manager of Dinamo Zagreb by the end of the 2021–22 season, in which he eventually led them to win their 23rd league title.

Čačić successfully guided Dinamo back into the Champions League group stages the following season, beating Shkupi, Ludogorets and Bodø/Glimt in the qualification rounds. Dinamo won their opening match in the group stage against Chelsea at the Maksimir, thanks to a goal from Mislav Oršić. Chelsea boss Thomas Tuchel was subsequently sacked the following day.

== Managerial statistics ==
As of match played 5 April 2023

Team	From	To	Record				
Team	From	To	G	W	D	L	Win %
Libya U23	23 June 2005	3 July 2005	5	1	2	2	20.00
Inter Zaprešić	28 October 2006	18 August 2007	5	0	1	4	0.00
Lokomotiva Zagreb	31 October 2011	23 December 2011	4	3	1	0	75.00
Dinamo Zagreb	23 December 2011	26 November 2012	54	32	12	10	59.26
Radnik Sesvete	14 April 2013	5 June 2013	7	3	1	3	42.86
Maribor	5 June 2013	29 September 2013	22	10	6	6	45.45
Slaven Belupo	4 November 2014	3 June 2015	22	9	6	7	40.91
Lokomotiva Zagreb	3 June 2015	21 September 2015	15	6	3	6	40.00
Croatia	21 September 2015	7 October 2017	25	15	6	4	60.00
Pyramids	26 December 2019	1 November 2020	36	23	5	8	63.89
Dinamo Zagreb	21 April 2022	5 April 2023	50	30	10	10	60.00
Total			245	132	53	60	53.88

== Honours ==
=== Manager ===
Dinamo Zagreb

- Croatian Football League: 2011–12, 2021–22
- Croatian Cup: 2011–12
- Croatian Supercup: 2022

Maribor

- Slovenian Supercup: 2013

Pyramids

- CAF Confederation Cup runners-up : 2019–20

Libya U20

- Mediterranean Games third place: 2005

Individual

- IFFHS World's 7th Best National Coach: 2016
