= Ranko Moravac =

Serbian footballer (born 1995)

Personal information
- Date of birth: 25 January 1995 (age 31)
- Place of birth: Novi Sad, FR Yugoslavia
- Height: 1.73 m (5 ft 8 in)
- Position: Midfielder

Youth career
- 2001–2008: Vojvodina
- 2008–2010: ČSK Čelarevo
- 2011–2014: Maribor

Senior career*
Years	Team	Apps	(Gls)
2013–2018	Maribor	8	(0)
2013	→ Veržej (loan)	3	(0)
2014–2017	Maribor B	28	(10)
2016	→ Krško (loan)	2	(0)
2018	→ Fužinar (loan)	13	(6)
2018–2019	Fužinar	19	(9)
2020	Fužinar	1	(0)
2020–2021	Jedinstvo Rumenka		
2021–2022	Jedinstvo Stara Pazova		

International career
- Serbia U16
- * Club domestic league appearances and goals

Ranko Moravac (Serbian Cyrillic: Ранко Моравац; born 25 January 1995) is a Serbian footballer who plays as a midfielder.

== Club career ==
Moravac came to Slovenia with his father in summer 2010, when he was on a trial with Maribor youth selections. He officially joined Maribor on 1 July 2011. However, being under the age of 18 and foreigner, he could not be registered for the club, thus he was unable to play in official matches. He trained with the first team and played a few friendlies until 25 January 2013, when he turned 18 and was finally registered for official competitions.

== International career ==
Moravac was capped for Serbia at under-16 level.

== Personal life ==
His younger brother, Ljubomir Moravac, is a former football goalkeeper. On 2 August 2016, Ljubomir was seriously injured in a traffic collision after returning from a training session and had to retire.

== Honours ==
Maribor

- Slovenian Championship: 2012–13, 2013–14, 2016–17
- Slovenian Cup: 2012–13
- Slovenian Supercup: 2013, 2014
