= Miroslav Cvijanović =

Slovenian footballer

Personal information
- Date of birth: 14 May 1985 (age 41)
- Place of birth: Nova Gorica, SFR Yugoslavia
- Height: 1.88 m (6 ft 2 in)
- Position: Centre-back

Youth career
- –2004: Bilje

Senior career*
Years	Team	Apps	(Gls)
2005–2009	Primorje	119	(3)
2004–2005	→ Bilje (loan)	8	(0)
2009–2011	Olimpija Ljubljana	51	(1)
2012–2013	Krka	40	(3)
2014–2015	Kras Repen	11	(0)

International career
2007	Slovenia U20	1	(0)
- * Club domestic league appearances and goals

Miroslav Cvijanović (born 14 May 1985) is a Slovenian retired footballer. He played for Primorje, Bilje, Olimpija Ljubljana, Krka, and Kras Repen.

== Personal life ==
He is a cousin of Goran Cvijanović, who is also a former footballer.
