= Blaž Božič =

Slovenian footballer

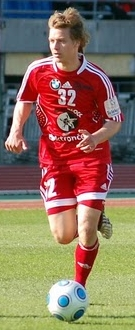

Personal information
- Full name: Blaž Božič
- Date of birth: 23 October 1990 (age 36)
- Place of birth: Ljubljana, SFR Yugoslavia
- Height: 1.80 m (5 ft 11 in)
- Position: Midfielder

Team information
- Current team: URC Thal/Assling
- Number: 20

Youth career
- –2005: Olimpija
- 2005–2007: Svoboda
- 2007–2008: Interblock

Senior career*
Years	Team	Apps	(Gls)
2008–2010	Interblock	44	(0)
2010–2015	Olimpija Ljubljana	70	(2)
2015–2016	SC Schwaz	6	(0)
2016	Šenčur	11	(0)
2016–2017	ASD Cordenons	15	(1)
2017–2018	Ilirija 1911	5	(0)
2018	SV Arnoldstein	15	(2)
2019	SF Rückersdorf	13	(1)
2019–	URC Thal/Assling	72	(1)

International career
2006–2007	Slovenia U17	6	(0)
2007–2008	Slovenia U20	6	(0)
2008–2009	Slovenia U19	5	(0)
2010	Slovenia U20	1	(0)
2010–2012	Slovenia U21	5	(0)
- * Club domestic league appearances and goals as of 11 August 2023

Blaž Božič (born 23 October 1990) is a Slovenian football midfielder who plays for Austrian side URC Thal/Assling.

He has played in the Austrian lower leagues since joining SV Arnoldstein in 2018.
