= Urban Žibert =

Slovenian footballer

Personal information
- Date of birth: 8 May 1992 (age 34)
- Place of birth: Ljubljana, Slovenia
- Height: 1.83 m (6 ft 0 in)
- Position: Midfielder

Team information
- Current team: Caronnese

Youth career
- –2009: Domžale
- 2009–2010: Celje
- 2010–2011: Portorož Piran
- 2011: → Triestina Berretti (loan)

Senior career*
Years	Team	Apps	(Gls)
2011–2015	Koper	77	(5)
2015	Reggina	12	(0)
2015–2016	Akragas	30	(5)
2016–2019	Juve Stabia	7	(0)
2017	→ Bassano Virtus (loan)	9	(0)
2017	→ Monopoli (loan)	11	(0)
2018	→ Akragas (loan)	13	(0)
2018–2019	→ Reggina (loan)	21	(0)
2019–2020	Reggina	11	(0)
2019–2020	→ Bisceglie (loan)	25	(0)
2020–2022	Mantova	49	(4)
2022	Vibonese	15	(0)
2023	USV Allerheiligen	14	(0)
2023-	Caronnese		

International career
2007	Slovenia U15	1	(0)
2008	Slovenia U16	5	(0)
2008–2009	Slovenia U17	5	(0)
2010	Slovenia U19	2	(0)
2011–2013	Slovenia U20	7	(0)
2011–2014	Slovenia U21	9	(0)
- * Club domestic league appearances and goals as of 24 April 2022

Urban Žibert (born 8 May 1992) is a Slovenian professional footballer who plays as a midfielder.

== Club career ==
On 19 July 2016 he became a new Juve Stabia player.

On 18 January 2017, Žibert was signed by Bassano on loan.

On 31 August 2017 he went to Monopoli on loan.

He returned to Reggina on loan for the 2018–19 season on 31 August 2018.

On 31 January 2019, Reggina acquired his rights on a permanent basis.

On 2 September 2019 he was loaned to Bisceglie.

On 27 August 2020 he became a new Mantova player.

On 31 January 2022, Žibert moved to Vibonese.
