= Igor Barukčič =

Slovenian footballer

Personal information
- Full name: Igor Barukčič
- Date of birth: 12 November 1990 (age 35)
- Place of birth: SFR Yugoslavia
- Position: Midfielder

Youth career
- Olimpija
- 2005–2009: Factor / Interblock

Senior career*
Years	Team	Apps	(Gls)
2009	Livar	13	(0)
2011	Krka	13	(2)
2011–2019	Radomlje	165	(23)
2015	→ Radomlje B	3	(1)
2020	Radomlje	0	(0)

International career
2006–2007	Slovenia U17	5	(0)
2007–2008	Slovenia U18	4	(0)
2009	Slovenia U19	1	(0)
- * Club domestic league appearances and goals as of 23 June 2019

Igor Barukčič (born 12 November 1990) is a football midfielder from Slovenia.
