= Rok Sirk =

Slovenian footballer (born 1993)

Personal information
- Date of birth: 10 September 1993 (age 33)
- Place of birth: Slovenia
- Height: 1.84 m (6 ft 0 in)
- Position: Forward

Team information
- Current team: Dravograd

Youth career
- –2008: Dravograd
- 2008–2012: Maribor

Senior career*
Years	Team	Apps	(Gls)
2014–2017	Maribor	1	(0)
2013–2014	→ Malečnik (loan)	18	(3)
2014–2017	Maribor B	66	(47)
2017–2019	Mura	62	(30)
2019–2021	Zagłębie Lubin	29	(2)
2021	→ Radomiak Radom (loan)	4	(0)
2021–2023	Maribor	40	(4)
2023–2024	SV Allerheiligen	12	(3)
2024	SC Kalsdorf	11	(2)
2024	Pöllauer SK	9	(1)
2025–	Dravograd		

International career
2008	Slovenia U15	2	(1)
2009	Slovenia U16	1	(0)
2010	Slovenia U18	3	(1)
2011	Slovenia U19	2	(0)
2019	Slovenia B	1	(0)
- * Club domestic league appearances and goals as of 10 January 2025

Rok Sirk (born 10 September 1993) is a Slovenian footballer who plays as a forward for Dravograd.

== Honours ==
Maribor

- Slovenian PrvaLiga: 2013–14, 2021–22

Mura

- Slovenian Second League: 2017–18

Radomiak Radom

- I liga: 2020–21
