= Miha Korošec =

Slovenian footballer

Personal information
- Full name: Miha Korošec
- Date of birth: 11 August 1991 (age 35)
- Place of birth: SFR Yugoslavia
- Position: Defender

Team information
- Current team: Šmarje pri Jelšah

Youth career
- –2010: Šampion

Senior career*
Years	Team	Apps	(Gls)
2009–2010	Šampion	21	(0)
2011–2012	Nafta Lendava	45	(1)
2012–2014	Celje	55	(0)
2012	→ Šampion (loan)	2	(0)
2014	Šampion	12	(2)
2015	Zavrč	10	(0)
2015–2019	Šampion	102	(29)
2020-	Šmarje pri Jelšah		

International career
2007–2008	Slovenia U17	9	(0)
2009	Slovenia U19	1	(0)
- * Club domestic league appearances and goals as of 16 July 2020

Miha Korošec (born 11 August 1991) is a Slovenian football player who plays for Šmarje pri Jelšah.
