= 2012 Slovenian Supercup =

- Event: 2012 Slovenian Supercup
Olimpija Ljubljana	Maribor
1	2
- Date: 8 July 2012
- Venue: Ljudski vrt, Maribor
- Referee: Damir Skomina
- Attendance: 4,150

The 2012 Slovenian Supercup was the eighth edition of the Slovenian Supercup, an annual football match contested by the winners of the previous season's Slovenian PrvaLiga and Slovenian Cup competitions. The match was played on 8 July 2012, in Ljudski vrt stadium between 2011–12 Slovenian PrvaLiga runners-up Olimpija Ljubljana and 2011–12 Slovenian PrvaLiga winners Maribor, as Maribor won both the Slovenian Cup and the Slovenian PrvaLiga in the previous season.

== Match details ==
8 July 2012
20:00 CEST

Olimpija Ljubljana	1–2	Maribor
Ivelja 50'	Report	Filipović 27'; Ibraimi 78'

Ljudski vrt, Maribor
Attendance: 4,150
Referee: Damir Skomina

Olimpija	Maribor

OLIMPIJA:
GK	30	(Slovenia) Elvis Džafić
CB	6	(Slovenia) Aris Zarifović
CB	26	(Serbia) Sreten Sretenović (c)
LB	33	(Slovenia) Erik Salkić	(substituted off) 83'
RM	23	(Slovenia) Dalibor Radujko	(yellow card) 59'
CM	5	(Slovenia) Boban Jović	(yellow card) 89'
CM	8	(Slovenia) Damjan Trifković	(yellow card) 62'
CM	25	(Slovenia) Anej Lovrečič
LM	19	(Serbia) Đorđe Ivelja	50' (substituted off) 66'
FW	9	(Slovenia) Davor Škerjanc	(substituted off) 46'
FW	10	(Slovenia) Andraž Šporar
Substitutes:
GK	1	(Slovenia) Aleksander Šeliga
DF	20	(Slovenia) Antonio Delamea
MF	21	(Slovenia) Nik Omladič	(substituted on) 66'
MF	16	(Slovenia) Blaž Božič
FW	11	(Slovenia) Filip Valenčič
FW	7	(Brazil) Franklin Vicente	(substituted on) 46'
FW	15	(Slovenia) Adnan Bešić	(substituted on) 83'
Manager:
(Slovenia) Ermin Šiljak

MARIBOR:
GK	33	(Slovenia) Jasmin Handanović
RB	7	(Slovenia) Aleš Mejač
CB	22	(Slovenia) Nejc Potokar
CB	26	(Slovenia) Aleksander Rajčević
LB	24	(Slovenia) Dejan Trajkovski
RM	10	(North Macedonia) Agim Ibraimi	78'
CM	5	(Slovenia) Željko Filipović	27'
CM	70	(Slovenia) Aleš Mertelj	(yellow card) 35' (yellow-red card) 90'
LM	20	(Slovenia) Goran Cvijanović	(substituted off) 70'
FW	11	(Slovenia) Etien Velikonja	(substituted off) 68'
FW	9	(Brazil) Marcos Tavares (c)	(substituted off) 89'
Substitutes:
GK	12	(Slovenia) Marko Pridigar
DF	44	(Brazil) Arghus
DF	35	(Slovenia) Mitja Rešek
MF	8	(Croatia) Dejan Mezga	(substituted on) 70'
MF	92	(Slovenia) Matic Črnic
MF	55	(Slovenia) Rajko Rep	(substituted on) 89'
FW	32	(Slovenia) Robert Berić	(substituted on) 68'
Manager:
(Slovenia) Darko Milanič

Man of the Match:
(Slovenia) Željko Filipović (Maribor)

Assistant referees:
Anton Šinkovec
Vinko Vozlič
Fourth official:
Roberto Ponis
Delegate:
Vlado Močnik

Slovenian Supercup
2012 Winners
Maribor
2nd title

== See also ==
- 2011–12 Slovenian PrvaLiga
- 2011–12 Slovenian Football Cup
- 2012–13 NK Maribor season
