= Arghus =

Brazilian footballer (born 1988)

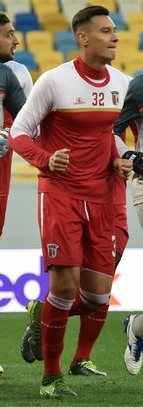

Personal information
- Full name: Arghus Soares Bordignon
- Date of birth: 19 January 1988 (age 38)
- Place of birth: Alegrete, Brazil
- Height: 1.89 m (6 ft 2 in)
- Position: Centre-back

Youth career
- 2000–2002: Grêmio
- 2005: Atlético Paranaense
- 2007: Juventude
- 2007: → Reggina (loan)

Senior career*
Years	Team	Apps	(Gls)
2009	Brasil de Pelotas	1	(0)
2009–2011	SE River Plate	4	(1)
2011–2015	Maribor	65	(7)
2015–2018	Braga	8	(0)
2016–2017	→ Excelsior (loan)	1	(0)
2017	→ Braga B	4	(1)
2018–2019	Panetolikos	29	(2)
2019–2020	Académica	15	(0)
2020–2021	Casa Pia	9	(0)
- * Club domestic league appearances and goals as of 22 May 2021

Arghus Soares Bordignon (born 19 January 1988), known as simply Arghus, is a Brazilian football centre-back.

== Club career ==
After a series of short spells with various Brazilian and European clubs, Arghus signed a three-year contract with Slovenian club Maribor in 2011. Between December 2011 and May 2012, Arghus was sidelined due to injury and returned on the football pitch in late May 2012 as a substitute in a match against Mura 05, scoring a goal just several minutes later.

On 4 August 2016, he signed for Excelsior on a one-year loan deal.

On 26 January 2018, Panetolikos officially announced their deal with Arghus, who was released from Braga for an undisclosed fee. He signed a contract until the summer of 2019. His first goal came on 25 February 2019, in a 1–0 home win against PAS Giannina. Two weeks later, he opened the score in a 5–0 home win against Panionios.

== Honours ==
Maribor

- Slovenian PrvaLiga (4): 2011–12, 2012–13, 2013–14, 2014–15
- Slovenian Cup (2): 2011–12, 2012–13
- Slovenian Supercup (3): 2012, 2013, 2014

Braga

- Taça de Portugal (1): 2015–16

== Personal life ==
Unlike many Brazilian men's footballers, who lived and played football on the streets, Arghus had a better life as a child, living in a small and quiet town. His mother was a Portuguese language professor and his father a policeman. He also has a younger brother who is involved in football. Arghus is multilingual, speaking three languages fluently: Portuguese, Spanish and Italian. He is married to a long-time girlfriend and childhood friend, Amanda. Arghus holds a dual citizenship of Brazil and Italy.

== External sources ==
- Arghus at Soccerway (archived)
- Arghus at PrvaLiga (in Slovene)
