= Luca Berardocco =

Italian footballer (born 1991)

Personal information
- Date of birth: 22 January 1991 (age 35)
- Place of birth: Pescara, Italy
- Height: 1.74 m (5 ft 9 in)
- Position: Midfielder

Team information
- Current team: Nola
- Number: 14

Youth career
- –2011: Pescara

Senior career*
Years	Team	Apps	(Gls)
2011–2013	Pescara	9	(0)
2011–2012	→ Pisa (loan)	16	(0)
2012	→ Viareggio (loan)	11	(2)
2013	→ FeralpiSalò (loan)	12	(2)
2013–2015	Parma	0	(0)
2013–2014	→ Gorica (loan)	21	(0)
2014–2015	→ Crotone (loan)	0	(0)
2015	→ Como (loan)	9	(0)
2015–2016	Carrarese	29	(1)
2016–2017	Sambenedettese	18	(2)
2017	Padova	9	(0)
2017–2020	Südtirol	85	(6)
2020–2022	Juve Stabia	53	(7)
2022	Carrarese	13	(0)
2022–2023	Juve Stabia	29	(1)
2023–2024	Giugliano	24	(0)
2024–2025	Matera	22	(0)
2025–	Nola	0	(0)
- * Club domestic league appearances and goals as of 11 February 2026

Luca Berardocco (born 22 January 1991) is an Italian footballer who plays as a midfielder for Serie D club Nola.

== Career ==
=== Pescara ===
Born in Pescara, Berardocco started his career at the hometown club. Berardocco made his Serie B debut in January 2011, the first season Pescara back first division from the third. Berardocco wore no.55 that season.

In July 2011, Pescara farmed Berardocco to Pisa. Pescara gifted half of the registration rights to Pisa for €500.

On 30 January 2012 Berardocco left for Viareggio in temporary deal. rejoining former Pescara teammate Bruno Martella.

He received a call-up to Italy Lega Pro representative team against Palestine Olympic (U23) team. However, he did not play. In June 2012 Berardocco returned to Pescara also for €500. Berardocco did not play any game in 2012–13 Serie A. On 30 January 2013 Berardocco was signed by FeralpiSalò.

In June 2013 it was reported that he requested to terminate the contract, which was made official on 2 July.

=== Parma ===
On 22 July 2013 Berardocco was signed by Parma F.C. on a free transfer; on 1 August he joined Slovenian club Nova Gorica in temporary deal along with Checcucci, Favalli, Gigli, Misuraca, Vanin and Vicente. The club had signed 9 players from Parma on 1 July. Berardocco made his debut on 2 August.

On 17 July 2014 he was signed by Serie B club Crotone on loan. On 30 January 2015 he was signed by Calcio Como.

=== Serie C clubs ===
In summer 2015 he was signed by Carrarese. On 9 July 2016 Berardocco was signed by Sambenedettese in a 1-year contract. On 5 January 2017 he was sold to fellow Lega Pro club Padova in a 1 1/2-year contract.

On 1 September 2020 he joined Juve Stabia.

On 14 January 2022, he returned to Carrarese.

On 10 August 2022, Berardocco rejoined Juve Stabia on a two-year contract.

On 25 August 2023, Berardocco moved to Giugliano on a one-year deal.
