= Denis Lidjan =

Slovenian footballer

Personal information
- Full name: Denis Lidjan
- Date of birth: 24 September 1993 (age 33)
- Place of birth: Ljubljana, Slovenia
- Position: Defender

Youth career
- –2010: Slovan
- 2010–2011: Interblock
- 2011–2012: Olimpija Ljubljana

Senior career*
Years	Team	Apps	(Gls)
2011–2013	Olimpija Ljubljana	3	(0)
2012	→ Triglav Kranj (loan)	0	(0)
2013–2018	Radomlje	85	(0)
2018–2020	Svoboda		

International career
2010	Slovenia U18	2	(0)
2011–2012	Slovenia U19	6	(0)
2012	Slovenia U20	1	(0)
- * Club domestic league appearances and goals as of 9 August 2018

Denis Lidjan (born 24 September 1993) is a Slovenian footballer.
