= Nejc Kolman =

Slovenian footballer

Personal information
- Full name: Nejc Kolman
- Date of birth: 26 February 1989 (age 37)
- Place of birth: Sempeter pri Gorici, SFR Yugoslavia
- Height: 1.82 m (6 ft 0 in)
- Position: Midfielder

Youth career
- –2008: Gorica

Senior career*
Years	Team	Apps	(Gls)
2008–2009	Tolmin	21	(4)
2009–2010	Nafta Lendava	17	(0)
2010–2011	Tolmin	19	(2)
2011	Primorje	14	(1)
2011	Racing de Ferrol	8	(0)
2011–2013	Compostela	37	(8)
2013	Shumen 2010	6	(0)
2013–2014	Celje	22	(1)
2014	Tolmin	3	(0)
2015	Heidelberg United	21	(1)
2016–2017	Moreland Zebras	44	(12)
2021-2023	Tolmin	61	(7)

International career
2007	Slovenia U18	2	(1)
2007	Slovenia U19	2	(0)
- * Club domestic league appearances and goals as of 4 October 2017

Nejc Kolman (born 26 February 1989) is a retired football player from Slovenia who played for Australian outfit Heidelberg United FC.

Playing professional football in Europe for 5 years, he also represented his country Slovenia, playing for youth national team of Slovenia (14 appearances, one goal) and played in qualifications for the European Championship. He has also five years older brother Saša Kolman who is former football player and now football manager in Australia.
