= Jasmin Handanović =

Slovenian footballer (born 1978)

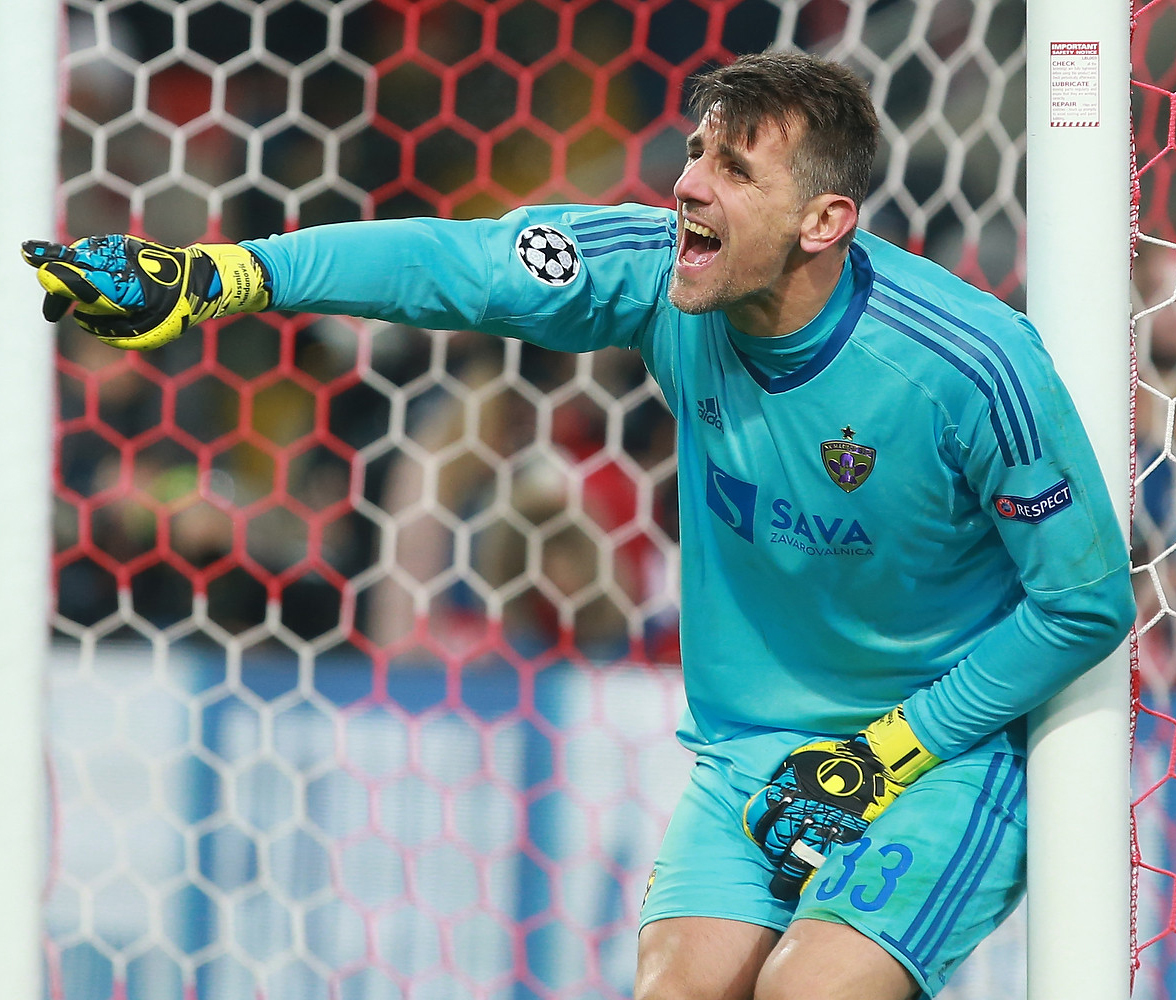
- Handanović with Maribor in 2017

Personal information
- Date of birth: 28 January 1978 (age 48)
- Place of birth: Ljubljana, SR Slovenia, SFR Yugoslavia
- Height: 1.96 m (6 ft 5 in)
- Position: Goalkeeper

Youth career
- 1993–1994: Svoboda Ljubljana
- 1994–1996: Olimpija

Senior career*
Years	Team	Apps	(Gls)
1994	Svoboda Ljubljana	0	(0)
1996–2001	Olimpija	11	(0)
2001	Grosuplje	3	(0)
2002	Triglav Kranj	8	(0)
2002–2003	Zagorje	30	(0)
2003–2004	Svoboda Ljubljana	26	(0)
2004	Olimpija	1	(0)
2005	Svoboda Ljubljana	15	(0)
2005–2007	Koper	66	(0)
2007–2010	Mantova	74	(0)
2010–2011	Empoli	26	(0)
2011–2021	Maribor	254	(0)
Total		514	(0)

International career
1995–1997	Slovenia U18	2	(0)
1997–1998	Slovenia U20	7	(0)
1999	Slovenia U21	1	(0)
2006	Slovenia B	2	(0)
2008–2012	Slovenia	8	(0)
- * Club domestic league appearances and goals

Jasmin Handanović (born 28 January 1978) is a Slovenian former professional footballer who played as a goalkeeper. He is the oldest player to ever play in the Slovenian PrvaLiga.

== Club career ==
In July 2010, Handanović was signed by Empoli, replacing Davide Bassi as the new first choice. However, he was then replaced by Alberto Pelagotti. In 2011, he signed for Maribor.

While playing for Maribor, on 5 November 2014, in a UEFA Champions League group match against Chelsea, he saved an 85th-minute penalty from Eden Hazard to ensure a 1–1 draw.

Handanović retired from professional football after the 2020–21 season. His jersey with the number 33 was retired by Maribor.

== International career ==
Handanović made his full international debut on 19 November 2008, in a 4–3 friendly defeat to Bosnia and Herzegovina. In his next international cap on 28 March 2009, he kept a clean sheet in a goalless World Cup qualifier against the Czech Republic. Handanović was one of three Slovenian goalkeepers chosen to go to the 2010 FIFA World Cup, but did not feature in any matches. He played his final game for the national team in September 2012 against Switzerland.

== Personal life ==
Jasmin is the cousin of Samir Handanović, who is also a professional goalkeeper.

== Honours ==
Olimpija

- Slovenian Cup: 1999–2000

Koper

- Slovenian Cup: 2005–06, 2006–07

Maribor

- Slovenian PrvaLiga: 2011–12, 2012–13, 2013–14, 2014–15, 2016–17, 2018–19
- Slovenian Cup: 2011–12, 2012–13, 2015–16
- Slovenian Supercup: 2012, 2013, 2014
