= Aleksandar Bajić =

Serbian footballer

Personal information
- Full name: Aleksandar Bajić
- Date of birth: 25 August 1987 (age 39)
- Place of birth: Belgrade, SFR Yugoslavia
- Height: 1.83 m (6 ft 0 in)
- Position: Striker

Senior career*
Years	Team	Apps	(Gls)
2005	Radnički Beograd	14	(5)
2006	Zrinjski Mostar	1	(0)
2006	Primorje	4	(1)
2008	Beograd	11	(4)
2008	SKA Rostov-on-Don	3	(0)
2009	Teleoptik	7	(1)
2010–2011	Radnički Obrenovac		
2011–2012	Beograd		
2012	Zalaegerszeg	2	(0)
2013	Celje	12	(2)
2015	Zlaté Moravce B	1	(0)
- * Club domestic league appearances and goals as of 19 January 2019

Aleksandar Bajić (Serbian Cyrillic: Александар Бајић; born 25 August 1987) is a retired Serbian professional footballer who played as a striker.

== Career ==
In his homeland, Bajić played for Radnički Beograd, Beograd (two spells), and Radnički Obrenovac in the Serbian League Belgrade, as well as for Teleoptik in the Serbian First League. He also spent several years abroad in Bosnia and Herzegovina, Slovenia, Russia, Hungary, and Slovakia. He retired in July 1 2020.
