= Dejan Trajkovski =

Slovenian footballer

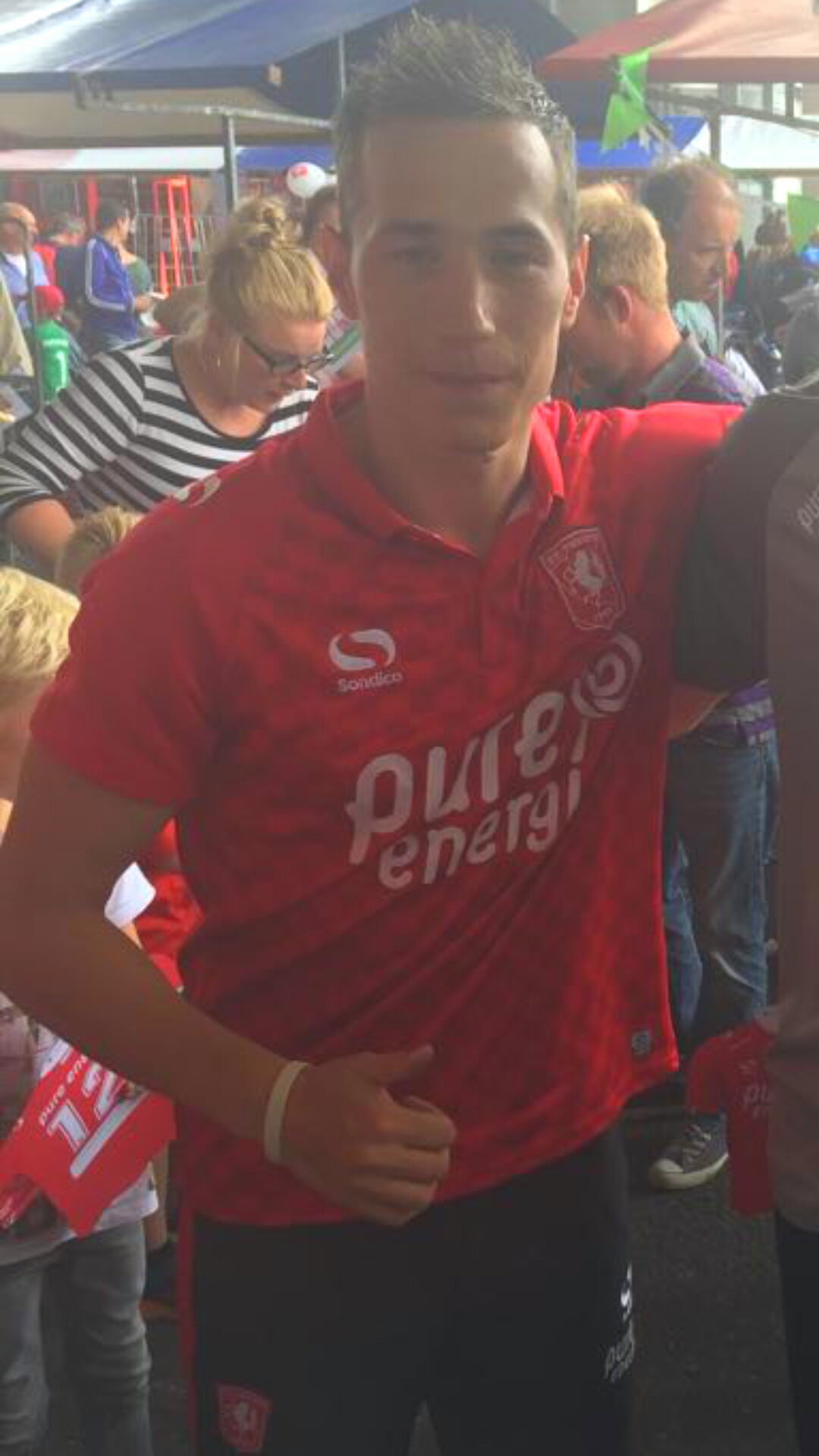

Personal information
- Date of birth: 14 April 1992 (age 34)
- Place of birth: Maribor, Slovenia
- Height: 1.75 m (5 ft 9 in)
- Position: Left-back

Team information
- Current team: Prishtina e Re
- Number: 92

Youth career
- Kovinar Maribor
- 2002–2011: Maribor

Senior career*
Years	Team	Apps	(Gls)
2011–2015	Maribor	35	(0)
2015–2017	Domžale	44	(1)
2016–2017	→ Twente (loan)	12	(0)
2017–2018	Twente	14	(0)
2017–2018	Jong FC Twente	5	(0)
2018–2019	Puskás Akadémia	26	(1)
2021	Spartak Trnava	15	(1)
2021	→ Petržalka (loan)	5	(0)
2022	Zrinjski Mostar	8	(0)
2022–2023	Vibonese	26	(1)
2024–2025	Džiugas	70	(3)
2026–	Prishtina e Re	16	(0)

International career
2011–2013	Slovenia U20	5	(0)
2011–2014	Slovenia U21	18	(0)
2016	Slovenia	1	(0)
- * Club domestic league appearances and goals as of 22 June 2026

Dejan Trajkovski (born 14 April 1992) is a Slovenian footballer who plays as a left-back for Kosovo Superleague club Prishtina e Re.

== Club career ==
Trajkovski signed with Spartak Trnava on 1 February 2021, after being without a club for a year and a half. However, he was released by Spartak in December of the same year.

== International career ==
Trajkovski received his first call-up to the senior Slovenia squad for the UEFA Euro 2016 qualifier against San Marino in October 2015. He made his debut for the team one year later, on 11 November 2016 against Malta.

== Personal life ==
He has a twin brother named Tadej who is also a footballer playing as a goalkeeper.

== Honours ==
Maribor

- Slovenian PrvaLiga: 2011–12, 2012–13, 2013–14
- Slovenian Cup: 2011–12, 2012–13
- Slovenian Supercup: 2012, 2013, 2014

Zrinjski Mostar

- Bosnian Premier League: 2021–22
