= Thierry Alain Mbognou =

Cameroonian footballer

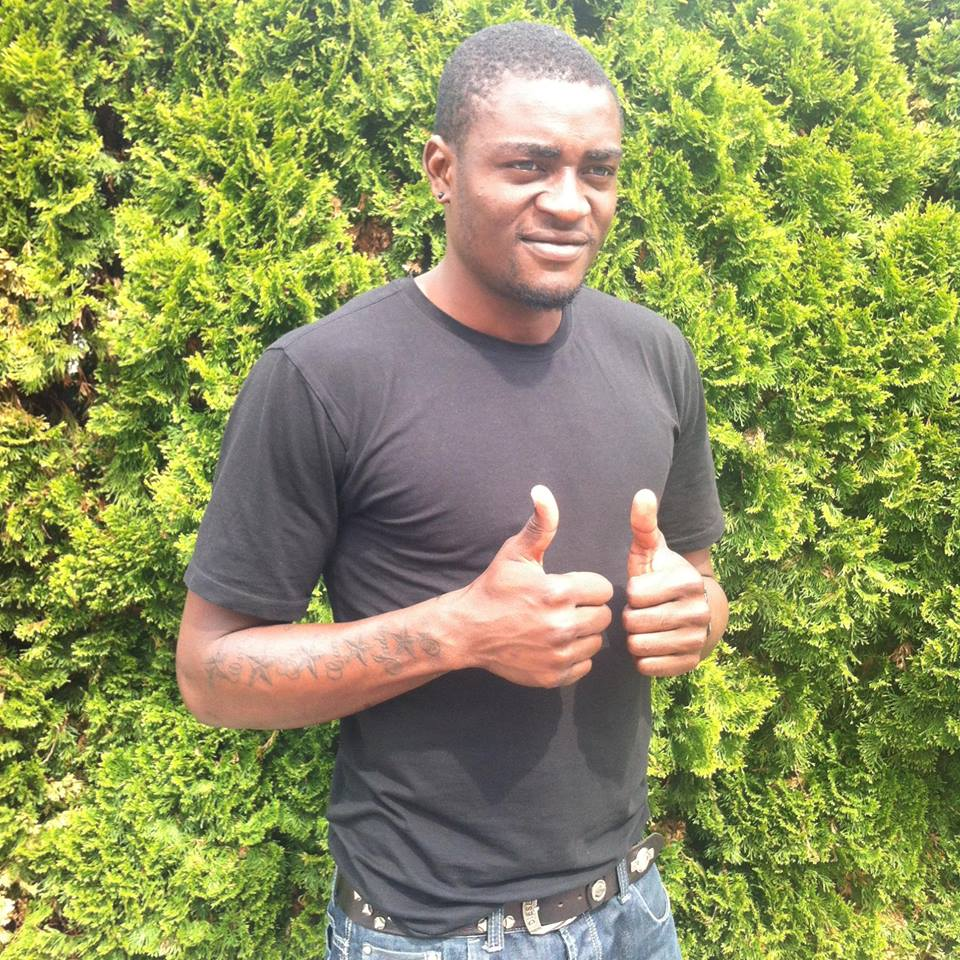
- Mbognou in April 2014

Personal information
- Full name: Thierry Alain Mbognou
- Date of birth: 30 November 1992 (age 33)
- Place of birth: Yaoundé, Cameroon
- Height: 1.88 m (6 ft 2 in)
- Position: Midfielder

Youth career
- 1998–2001: Canon-Sportif Young Boys Mfou

Senior career*
Years	Team	Apps	(Gls)
2011–2012	Schaan	12	(0)
2012–2013	Altach II	12	(0)
2013–2014	Krka	18	(0)
Total		42	(0)
- * Club domestic league appearances and goals as of 19 January 2015

Thierry Alain Mbognou (born 30 November 1992) is a Cameroonian footballer who plays as a midfielder for the Slovenian PrvaLiga club Krka. He previously played for Schaan in Liechtenstein and for Rheindorf Altach II in Austria.
