= Željko Filipović =

Slovenian footballer

Personal information
- Date of birth: 3 October 1988 (age 38)
- Place of birth: Ljubljana, SFR Yugoslavia
- Height: 1.94 m (6 ft 4 in)
- Position: Defensive midfielder

Youth career
- Domžale

Senior career*
Years	Team	Apps	(Gls)
2005–2006	Domžale	0	(0)
2006–2008	Bonifika	26	(2)
2008–2009	Olimpija Ljubljana	30	(1)
2009	Domžale	5	(0)
2010	Koper	4	(0)
2010–2016	Maribor	139	(1)
2016–2018	Mechelen	33	(1)
2018	Dynamo Brest	17	(0)
2019	Ittihad Tanger	0	(0)
2019	Atyrau	9	(0)
2019	Vojvodina	1	(0)

International career
2013–2014	Slovenia	4	(0)

Managerial career
- 2021: Svoboda Ljubljana
- * Club domestic league appearances and goals

Željko Filipović (born 3 October 1988) is a Slovenian retired professional footballer who played as a defensive midfielder.

== Club career ==
In 2018 Filipović played for Dynamo Brest in Belarus. He left the club in December 2018. On 6 February 2019, FC Atyrau announced the signing of Filipović. In June 2019 he announced in an interview that he had left the club. On 26 July 2019, Filipović signed a two-year deal with Serbian club Vojvodina.

== International career ==
Filipović made his debut for Slovenia in an August 2013 friendly match away against Finland.

== Honours ==
Koper

- Slovenian Supercup: 2010

Maribor

- Slovenian PrvaLiga: 2010–11, 2011–12, 2012–13, 2013–14, 2014–15
- Slovenian Cup: 2011–12, 2012–13, 2015–16
- Slovenian Supercup: 2012, 2013, 2014
