= Matej Peternel =

Slovenian footballer

Personal information
- Full name: Matej Peternel
- Date of birth: 22 August 1992 (age 34)
- Place of birth: Slovenia
- Position: Attacking midfielder

Team information
- Current team: Žiri
- Number: 8

Youth career
- –2012: Triglav Kranj

Senior career*
Years	Team	Apps	(Gls)
2010–2014	Triglav Kranj	15	(2)
2012	→ Zarica Kranj (loan)	19	(4)
2014–2015	Zarica Kranj	22	(2)
2018–	Žiri		
- * Club domestic league appearances and goals as of 25 May 2014

Matej Peternel (born 22 August 1992) is a Slovenian football midfielder who plays for Žiri.
