= Goran Cvijanović =

Slovenian footballer (born 1986)

Personal information
- Date of birth: 9 September 1986 (age 40)
- Place of birth: Šempeter pri Gorici, SFR Yugoslavia
- Height: 1.79 m (5 ft 10 in)
- Position: Midfielder

Team information
- Current team: Slovenia U17 (manager)

Youth career
- 1997–2005: Gorica

Senior career*
Years	Team	Apps	(Gls)
2005–2010	Gorica	102	(15)
2010–2014	Maribor	130	(31)
2014–2015	Rijeka	15	(1)
2015	Gorica	9	(1)
2016	Al-Arabi	13	(3)
2016–2017	Celje	23	(1)
2017–2018	Korona Kielce	29	(9)
2018–2019	Arka Gdynia	17	(0)
2020–2021	Gorica	31	(1)
Total		369	(62)

International career
2001	Slovenia U15	13	(0)
2006	Slovenia U20	1	(0)
2007–2008	Slovenia U21	7	(0)
2012–2014	Slovenia	4	(0)

Managerial career
- 2024: Slovenia U16
- 2024–2025: Slovenia U17
- 2025–2026: Slovenia U16
- 2026–: Slovenia U17
- * Club domestic league appearances and goals

Goran Cvijanović (born 9 September 1986) is a Slovenian professional football manager and former player who played as a midfielder.

== International career ==
Cvijanović made his debut for Slovenia in an October 2012 World Cup qualification match against Cyprus, coming on as a 84th-minute substitute for Josip Iličić.

== Personal life ==
Cvijanović spent his early years in Nova Gorica, and moved to Šempeter pri Gorici when he was seven years old. His cousin Miroslav Cvijanović is also a former footballer.

== Honours ==
Gorica

- Slovenian PrvaLiga: 2005–06

Maribor

- Slovenian PrvaLiga: 2010–11, 2011–12, 2012–13, 2013–14
- Slovenian Cup: 2011–12, 2012–13
- Slovenian Supercup: 2012, 2013

Arka Gdynia

- Polish Super Cup: 2018
