= Niko Snoj =

Slovenian footballer

Personal information
- Full name: Niko Snoj
- Date of birth: 13 July 1990 (age 36)
- Place of birth: SFR Yugoslavia
- Position: Midfielder

Youth career
- 2004-2005: Olimpija
- 2005-2009: Interblock

Senior career*
Years	Team	Apps	(Gls)
2009–2013	Radomlje	54	(5)
2013	Triglav Kranj	1	(0)
2013–2014	Radomlje	43	(4)
2015–2016	Ivančna Gorica	16	(4)
2017–2018	Tabor Sežana	10	(1)
- * Club domestic league appearances and goals as of 27 January 2024

Niko Snoj (born 13 July 1990) is a football midfielder from Slovenia.
