= Dejan Mezga =

Croatian footballer (born 1985)

Personal information
- Date of birth: 16 July 1985 (age 41)
- Place of birth: Čakovec, SR Croatia, Yugoslavia
- Height: 1.75 m (5 ft 9 in)
- Position: Midfielder

Youth career
- Sloboda Slakovec
- Venera PMP
- 2002–2004: Varteks

Senior career*
Years	Team	Apps	(Gls)
2000–2002	Sloga Čakovec		
2004–2007	Čakovec	73	(17)
2007–2014	Maribor	159	(39)
2014–2015	Hajduk Split	21	(3)
2015–2016	Apollon Limassol	25	(2)
2016–2017	Maribor	4	(0)
2017	Nacional	6	(1)
2017–2018	Inter Zaprešić	4	(0)
2018	Varaždin	2	(0)
2018–2021	Polet Sv. Martin na Muri	49	(40)
2021–2023	SV Übelbach	38	(13)
- * Club domestic league appearances and goals

Dejan Mezga (born 16 July 1985) is a former Croatian footballer who played as a midfielder.

During his career, he played for Čakovec, Maribor, Hajduk Split, Apollon Limassol, Nacional, Inter Zaprešić, Varaždin, Polet Sv. Martin na Muri, and SV Übelbach.

Mezga acquired Slovenian citizenship on 23 August 2012.

== Career ==
Coming from the village of Brezje, near Čakovec, in the region of Međimurje, Mezga went through the ranks of several lower-tier local clubs, debuting at the age of 15 for the seniors of NK Sloga Čakovec, before joining the under-17 team of NK Varteks. In his last season of eligibility for the under-19 team, he left the club, however, and joined the Croatian Second League side NK Čakovec, where he played for the next three years.

In 2007, Mezga joined Slovenian PrvaLiga side Maribor. He soon established himself in the first team and won his first league title with the team in 2009, and was also declared the most distinguished player of the season by the Maribor fans. Maribor went on to win four titles in the following five seasons, with Mezga featuring heavily in all campaigns, and was selected in the league's ideal eleven of the 2011–12 championship.

After his contract expired in the summer of 2014, Mezga joined Hajduk Split in his homeland. He briefly returned to Maribor in August 2016, before signing for Portuguese side Nacional in January 2017.
