= NK Maribor B =

Maribor B
- Full name: Nogometni klub Maribor B
- Nickname(s): Vijoličasti (The Purples)
- Founded: June 2014; 11 years ago
- Dissolved: June 2017; 8 years ago
- Ground: Tabor Sports Park
- Website: https://www.nkmaribor.com/
Home colours	Away colours

Nogometni klub Maribor "B" (English: Maribor B Football Club), commonly referred to as NK Maribor B or simply Maribor B, was an association football club based in the city of Maribor, Slovenia. Founded in 2014, NK Maribor B was the reserve team of NK Maribor. The team was dissolved following the 2016–17 season. Reserve teams in Slovenia play in the same league system as the senior teams, however, they cannot play in the same competition as their senior teams, and thus, Maribor B was ineligible to play in the Slovenian PrvaLiga or the Slovenian Cup.

== History ==
During their first two seasons, Maribor B was ineligible for promotion to the Slovenian Second League due to the rules of the Football Association of Slovenia which prevented reserve teams of the top division clubs to play in the Second League. This rule was lifted in June 2016. Only players between the age of 17 and 23 had the right to play for Maribor B, with the exception of members of the first team, who would become eligible to play for the reserve team in case of a lengthy injury.

Maribor B played their first match on 10 July 2014 on a neutral venue in Dokležovje, when they faced Bosnia and Herzegovina top division side Sloboda Tuzla in an international friendly match, which they lost 1–0. The team played their first official league match on 23 August 2014 against Mons Claudius in Rogatec and won 9–1. After six wins in the first six rounds, Maribor B suffered their first league defeat on 12 October 2014 when they were defeated 1–0 in an away match against Podvinci. The team finished their inaugural season as the winners of the North Group in the Slovenian Third League, however, they were unable to promote due to the rules of the Football Association of Slovenia.

== Season-by-season record ==
=== Key ===
Matches

- P = Matches played
- W = Matches won
- D = Matches drawn
- L = Matches lost
- F = Goals for
- A = Goals against
- Pts = Points won
- Pos = Final position

Competitions

- Div 3 = Slovenian Third League (North)
- — = Did not compete

Champions †	Runners-up ‡	Promoted ↑	Relegated ↓	Top scorer in the competition ♦

=== Domestic record ===
List of year ranges, representing seasons, and displaying the numbers and types of accomplishments of awards by the team and its players during those timeframes
Season	Division	P	W	D	L	F	A	Pts	Pos	Cup	Supercup	Competition	Result	Name	Goals
Season	League									Cup	Supercup	Other		Top scorer	
2014–15	Div 3	26	22	1	3	80	25	67	1st †	—	—	—	—	Alen Ploj	20
2015–16	Div 3	26	18	7	1	102	24	61	2nd ‡	—	—	—	—	Sven Dodlek	19
2016–17	Div 3	26	21	3	2	107	25	66	1st †	—	—	—	—	Anel Hajrić	33 ♦
