= Slovenia national under-17 football team =

National U-17 association football team

Slovenia Under-17
- Association: Football Association of Slovenia
- Confederation: UEFA (Europe)
- Head coach: Goran Cvijanović
- FIFA code: SVN
First colours	Second colours

European Championship
- Appearances: 4 (first in 2012)
- Best result: Group stage (2012, 2015, 2018, 2023)

The Slovenia national under-17 football team is the national under-17 football team of Slovenia and is governed by the Football Association of Slovenia. The team competes in the UEFA European Under-17 Championship, which is held annually. Their first appearance in a major tournament took place in 2012, when they qualified for the 2012 UEFA European Under-17 Championship as the host country.

== Competitive record ==
=== FIFA U-17 World Cup ===
Year	Round	Pld	W	D	L	F	A
(Japan) 1993	Did not qualify						
(Ecuador) 1995	Did not qualify						
(Egypt) 1997	Did not qualify						
(New Zealand) 1999	Did not qualify						
(Trinidad and Tobago) 2001	Did not qualify						
(Finland) 2003	Did not qualify						
(Peru) 2005	Did not qualify						
(South Korea) 2007	Did not qualify						
(Nigeria) 2009	Did not qualify						
(Mexico) 2011	Did not qualify						
(United Arab Emirates) 2013	Did not qualify						
(Chile) 2015	Did not qualify						
(India) 2017	Did not qualify						
(Brazil) 2019	Did not qualify						
(Indonesia) 2023	Did not qualify						
(Qatar) 2025	Did not qualify						
(Qatar) 2026	Did not qualify						
(Qatar) 2027	Did not qualify						

=== UEFA European Under-17 Championship ===
Year	Round	Pld	W	D	L	F	A
(Denmark) 2002	Did not qualify						
(Portugal) 2003	Did not qualify						
(France) 2004	Did not qualify						
(Italy) 2005	Did not qualify						
(Luxembourg) 2006	Did not qualify						
(Belgium) 2007	Did not qualify						
(Turkey) 2008	Did not qualify						
(Germany) 2009	Did not qualify						
(Liechtenstein) 2010	Did not qualify						
(Serbia) 2011	Did not qualify						
(Slovenia) 2012	Group stage	3	0	1	2	3	7
(Slovakia) 2013	Did not qualify						
(Malta) 2014	Did not qualify						
(Bulgaria) 2015	Group stage	3	0	0	3	0	3
(Azerbaijan) 2016	Did not qualify						
(Croatia) 2017	Did not qualify						
(England) 2018	Group stage	3	0	0	3	0	8
(Republic of Ireland) 2019	Did not qualify						
(Israel) 2022	Did not qualify						
(Hungary) 2023	Group stage	3	1	0	2	5	8
(Cyprus) 2024	Did not qualify						
(Albania) 2025	Did not qualify						
(Estonia) 2026	Did not qualify						
(Latvia) 2027	Did not qualify						
Total	Group stage	12	1	1	10	8	26
