= 2013 Slovenian Supercup =

- Event: 2013 Slovenian Supercup
Maribor	Olimpija Ljubljana
3	0
- Date: 7 July 2013
- Venue: Arena Petrol, Celje
- Referee: Darko Čeferin
- Attendance: 1,800

The 2013 Slovenian Supercup was the ninth edition of the Slovenian Supercup, an annual football match contested by the winners of the previous season's Slovenian PrvaLiga and Slovenian Cup competitions. The match was played on 7 July 2013 at the Arena Petrol stadium in Celje between the 2012–13 Slovenian PrvaLiga winners Maribor and the 2012–13 Slovenian PrvaLiga runners-up Olimpija Ljubljana, as Maribor won both the Slovenian Cup and the Slovenian PrvaLiga in the previous season.

== Match details ==
7 July 2013
20:00 CEST

Maribor	3–0	Olimpija Ljubljana
Tavares 25'; Mezga 45+1'; Cvijanović 63'	Report

Arena Petrol, Celje
Attendance: 1,800
Referee: Darko Čeferin

Maribor	Olimpija

Slovenian Supercup
2013 Winners
Maribor
3rd title

== See also ==
- 2012–13 Slovenian PrvaLiga
- 2012–13 Slovenian Football Cup
- 2013–14 NK Maribor season
