= 2015–16 NK Krka season =

NK Krka
2015–16 season
- President: Jože Berus
- Head Coach: Miloš Kostić
- Stadium: Portoval
- Slovenian League: 10th
- Slovenian Cup: Round of 16
- Top goalscorer: League: Josip Fuček (7); All: Josip Fuček (7)
- Highest home attendance: 800 (vs Olimpija)
- Lowest home attendance: 100 (vs Rudar)
- Average home league attendance: 442
Home colours	Away colours
- All statistics correct as of 25 May 2016.

The 2015–16 season is Krka's 5th season in the Slovenian PrvaLiga, Slovenian top division, since the league was created.

== Players ==
As of 1 March 2016

Note: Flags indicate national team as defined under FIFA eligibility rules; some limited exceptions apply. Players may hold more than one non-FIFA nationality.

No.	Pos.	Nation	Player
1	GK	SLO	Darko Marjanović
4	DF	CRO	Luka Bogdan
5	DF	SLO	Alen Vučkić
6	MF	CRO	Mario Brkljača
7	MF	CRO	Josip Fuček
8	DF	SLO	Erik Gliha
9	FW	CRO	Enes Novinić
10	MF	SLO	Denis Mojstrović
15	DF	SLO	Leo Ejup
16	MF	SLO	Miha Kostanjšek
17	DF	SLO	Danijel Dežmar (captain)
18	DF	CRO	Bruno Marotti
19	MF	SLO	Urban Kramar
20	MF	SLO	Matteo Boccaccini

No.	Pos.	Nation	Player
21	DF	NGR	Muhammed Kabiru
22	GK	SLO	Mateo Barukcic
24	MF	GHA	Nana Welbeck
25	FW	SLO	Grega Končar
27	FW	CRO	Marin Perić
30	FW	SRB	Mladen Mrakić
31	GK	SUI	Miodrag Mitrović
33	MF	NGR	Favour Aniekan
43	MF	SLO	Damjan Marjanović
44	MF	SLO	Jan Novak
55	MF	SLO	Matej Potokar
90	FW	CRO	Filip Dangubić
99	FW	SLO	Luka Majcen

Source: NK Krka

== Competitions ==
=== Overall ===
Competition	Started round	Current position / round	Final position / round	First match	Last match
PrvaLiga	—	—	10th	19 July 2015	21 May 2016
Cup	First round	—	Round of 16	19 August 2015	16 September 2015

Updated to match played 25 May 2016
Source: Competitions

=== Overview ===
Competition	Record							
Competition	Pld	W	D	L	GF	GA	GD	Win %
PrvaLiga	36	8	10	18	30	56	−26	22.22
Cup	2	1	0	1	5	4	+1	50.00
Total	38	9	10	19	35	60	−25	23.68

Last updated: 25 May 2016
Source: Competitions

=== League table ===
Pos	Team	Pld	W	D	L	GF	GA	GD	Pts	Qualification or relegation
6	Krško	36	10	11	15	24	48	−24	41 (Note: Krško ahead of Rudar Velenje on head-to-head record: Rudar–Krško 1–1, Krško–Rudar 0–0, Rudar–Krško 0–1, Krško–Rudar 1–1.)	
7	Rudar Velenje	36	11	8	17	34	52	−18	41	
8	Koper	36	11	7	18	40	54	−14	40 (Note: Koper ahead of Zavrč on head-to-head record: Zavrč–Koper 1–0, Koper–Zavrč 3–1, Zavrč–Koper 1–3, Koper–Zavrč 1–0.)	
9	Zavrč (R)	36	9	13	14	32	41	−9	40	Qualification for the relegation play-offs
10	Krka (R)	36	8	10	18	30	56	−26	34	Relegation to Slovenian Second League

Source: Slovenian PrvaLiga (in Slovene), Soccerway
Rules for classification: 1) Points; 2) Head-to-head points; 3) Head-to-head goal difference; 4) Head-to-head goals scored; 5) Goal difference; 6) Goals scored.
(R) Relegated

=== Results summary ===
Overall								Home						Away					
Pld	W	D	L	GF	GA	GD	Pts	W	D	L	GF	GA	GD	W	D	L	GF	GA	GD
36	8	10	18	30	56	−26	34	5	4	9	17	29	−12	3	6	9	13	27	−14

Last updated: 25 May 2016.
Source: Competitive matches

=== Results by round ===
Round	1	2	3	4	5	6	7	8	9	10	11	12	13	14	15	16	17	18	19	20	21	22	23	24	25	26	27	28	29	30	31	32	33	34	35	36
Ground	A	A	H	A	H	A	H	A	H	H	H	A	H	A	H	A	H	A	A	A	H	A	H	A	H	A	H	H	H	A	H	A	H	A	H	A
Result	W	D	L	W	L	D	L	D	L	D	W	L	D	L	W	D	L	L	D	L	W	L	W	L	L	L	L	L	D	L	W	D	D	W	L	L
Position	3	3	7	4	5	5	6	6	7	7	7	7	7	7	7	7	7	8	8	8	8	8	7	9	10	10	10	10	10	10	10	10	10	10	10	10

Source: Competitive matches
A = Away; H = Home; W = Win; D = Draw; L = Loss

==== Matches ====
Win Draw Loss

18 July 2015 1	Rudar	0 – 1	Krka	Velenje
18:30 CEST (UTC+02:00)	Eterović (yellow card) 26'; Jahić (yellow card) 34'; Kašnik (yellow card) 89'; Knezović (yellow card) 90+3'	Report (in Slovene)	Perić 43', (yellow card) 70'; Welbeck (yellow card) 70'; Kastrevec (yellow card) 80'	Stadium: Ob Jezeru City Stadium; Attendance: 1,050; Referee: Dejan Balažič

26 July 2015 2	Celje	1 – 1	Krka	Celje
20:15 CEST (UTC+02:00)	Mršić (yellow card) 80'; T.Klemenčič (yellow card) 84'; Vidmajer (red card) 86'; Firer 90+4'	Report (in Slovene)	Kastrevec (yellow card) 51'; Ejup (yellow card) 65'; Marotti (yellow card) 76'; Welbeck 87' (pen.); Collins (yellow card) 90+3'	Attendance: 700; Referee: Rade Obrenović

2 August 2015 3	Krka	1 – 2	Gorica	Novo Mesto
18:30 CEST (UTC+02:00)	Fuček 31'; Welbeck (yellow card) 33'; Collins (red card) 78'	Report (in Slovene)	Jogan (yellow card) 40'; Džuzdanović 42', (yellow card) 78'; Širok 54'; Arčon (yellow card) 66'; Martinović (yellow card) 74'	Stadium: Portoval; Attendance: 400; Referee: Damir Skomina

7 August 2015 4	Zavrč	0 – 1	Krka	Zavrč
18:30 CEST (UTC+02:00)	Novoselec (yellow card) 16'; Cvek (yellow card) 56'	Report (in Slovene)	Welbeck (yellow card) 68'; Ejup 76'	Stadium: Zavrč Sports Park; Attendance: 300; Referee: Mitja Žganec

12 August 2015 5	Krka	0 – 4	Domžale	Novo Mesto
17:30 CEST (UTC+02:00)		Report (in Slovene)	Trajkovski (yellow card) 21'; Podlogar 29'; Horvat (yellow card) 42'; Črnic 45', 58'; Majer (yellow card) 52'; Dobrovoljc (yellow card) 79'; Mance 90+3'	Stadium: Portoval; Attendance: 500; Referee: Roberto Ponis

15 August 2015 6	Krško	0 – 0	Krka	Krško
17:45 CEST (UTC+02:00)	Đukić (yellow card) 45'	Report (in Slovene)	Novinić (yellow card) 20'; Kastrevec (yellow card) 27'; Ejup (yellow card) 79'; Collins (yellow card) 86'	Stadium: Matija Gubec Stadium; Attendance: 1,550; Referee: Slavko Vinčić

23 August 2015 7	Krka	2 – 4	Koper	Novo Mesto
17:00 CEST (UTC+02:00)	Ejup (yellow card) 16'; Kastrevec (yellow card) 39'; Fuček 70', 79' (pen.)	Report (in Slovene)	Hadžić (yellow card) 26' (yellow-red card) 78'; Črnigoj (yellow card) 43'; Šme (yellow card) 55'; Štromajer 63', 82'; Halilović 75'; Ivančić 90+1'	Stadium: Portoval; Attendance: 500; Referee: Rade Obrenović

29 August 2015 8	Maribor	2 – 2	Krka	Maribor
17:45 CEST (UTC+02:00)	Mendy (yellow card) 20', (goal) 43'; Janža (yellow card) 45'; Mertelj (yellow card) 53'; Ibraimi 61'; Handanović (yellow card) 82'	Report (in Slovene)	Welbeck 8'; Marotti (yellow card) 35'; Mojstrović (yellow card) 60'; Dežmar (yellow card) 73'; Bogdan (yellow card) 80' (yellow-red card) 90'; Vučkić 85'	Stadium: Ljudski vrt Attendance: 2,500; Referee: Dragoslav Perić

11 September 2015 9	Krka	1 – 3	Olimpija	Novo Mesto
17:00 CEST (UTC+02:00)	Fuček (yellow card) 59'; Kastrevec 83'	Report (in Slovene)	Henty 53', (yellow card) 74'; Matić (yellow card) 57'; Bajrić (yellow card) 75'; Zajc 79', 86'	Stadium: Portoval; Attendance: 750; Referee: Bojan Mertik

19 September 2015 10	Krka	0 – 0	Rudar	Novo Mesto
16:00 CEST (UTC+02:00)	Gliha (yellow card) 54'; Kastrevec (yellow card) 59'; Vučkić (yellow card) 74'; Welbeck (yellow card) 85'	Report (in Slovene)	Trifković (yellow card) 66'; M.Babić (yellow card) 85'	Stadium: Portoval; Attendance: 300; Referee: Matej Jug

23 September 2015 11	Krka	1 – 0	Celje	Novo Mesto
16:00 CEST (UTC+02:00)	Dežmar (yellow card) 48'; Mojstrović (yellow card) 51'; Marotti (yellow card) 76'; Ejup (yellow card) 88'; Perić 90+4' (yellow card) 90+4'	Report (in Slovene)	Ahmedi (yellow card) 5'; Spremo (yellow card) 83'	Stadium: Portoval; Attendance: 300; Referee: Davor Drečnik

27 September 2015 12	Gorica	2 – 0	Krka	Nova Gorica
16:00 CEST (UTC+02:00)	Burgič 82'; Eleke 90+4', (yellow card) 90+4'	Report (in Slovene)	Bogdan (yellow card) 65'; Mitrović (red card) 65'; Gliha (yellow card) 73'	Stadium: Nova Gorica Sports Park; Attendance: 500; Referee: Slavko Vinčić

4 October 2015 13	Krka	1 – 1	Zavrč	Novo Mesto
16:00 CEST (UTC+02:00)	Perić 34'; Marotti (yellow card) 40'	Report (in Slovene)	Batrović 51'	Stadium: Portoval; Attendance: 400; Referee: Matej Jug

17 October 2015 14	Domžale	3 – 0	Krka	Domžale
20:00 CEST (UTC+02:00)	Skubic (yellow card) 16'; Vuk (yellow card) 23', (goal) 61'; Horvat 34', 50'; Črnic (yellow card) 41'	Report (in Slovene)	Fuček (yellow card) 37'; Gliha (yellow card) 53' (red card)	Stadium: Domžale Sports Park; Attendance: 650; Referee: Roberto Ponis

25 October 2015 15	Krka	2 – 0	Krško	Novo Mesto
14:00 CET (UTC+01:00)	Dangubić 16', (yellow card) 64'; Welbeck (yellow card) 71'; Novinić 90+3'	Report (in Slovene)	Perkovič (yellow card) 7'; Žinko (yellow card) 46'; Jurečič (yellow card) 78'	Stadium: Portoval; Attendance: 600; Referee: Damir Skomina

31 October 2015 16	Koper	0 – 0	Krka	Koper
20:00 CET (UTC+01:00)	Pavić (yellow card) 4'; Hadžić (yellow card) 16'; Rahmanović (yellow card) 75'	Report (in Slovene)	Perić (yellow card) 14'; Mojstrović (yellow card) 36'; Marotti (yellow card) 73'	Stadium: Bonifika Stadium; Attendance: 200; Referee: Mitja Žganec

8 November 2015 17	Krka	0 – 2	Maribor	Novo Mesto
14:00 CET (UTC+01:00)	Fuček (yellow card) 82'	Report (in Slovene)	Mertelj (yellow card) 20'; Bajde (yellow card) 58', (goal) 83'; Tavares 61', (yellow card) 74'; Handanović (yellow card) 64'; Filipović (yellow card) 69'	Stadium: Portoval; Attendance: 500; Referee: Vojko Goričan

25 November 2015 18	Olimpija	3 – 1	Krka	Ljubljana
17:30 CET (UTC+01:00)	Bogdan 20' (o.g.); Kronaveter 52', 78'; Kapun (yellow card) 80'	Report (in Slovene)	Welbeck (yellow card) 30'; Perić (yellow card) 68'; Kelhar 77' (o.g.)	Stadium: Stožice Stadium; Attendance: 1,000; Referee: Roberto Ponis

28 November 2015 19	Rudar	1 – 1	Krka	Velenje
15:30 CET (UTC+01:00)	Eterović 15' (pen.); Črnčič (yellow card) 30'; Žitko (yellow card) 45'	Report (in Slovene)	Collins (yellow card) 14'; Vučkić (yellow card) 25'; Welbeck 31' (pen.); Marotti (yellow card) 52'; Potokar (yellow card) 56'; Mojstrović (yellow card) 59'; Mitrović (red card) 88'	Stadium: Ob Jezeru City Stadium; Attendance: 350; Referee: Alen Borošak

2 December 2015 20	Celje	1 – 0	Krka	Celje
16:00 CET (UTC+01:00)	Firer (yellow card) 57'; Vrhovec (yellow card) 75'; Klemenčič 90+2'	Report (in Slovene)	Dangubić (yellow card) 56'; Kostanjšek (yellow card) 65'	Stadium: Arena Petrol; Attendance: 500; Referee: Davor Drečnik

6 December 2015 21	Krka	1 – 0	Gorica	Novo Mesto
13:00 CET (UTC+01:00)	Marotti (yellow card) 25'; Collins (yellow card) 37'; Ejup (yellow card) 47'; Kastrevec (yellow card) 75'; Gliha 86'	Report (in Slovene)	Arčon (yellow card) 13'; Johnson (yellow card) 40' (yellow-red card)	Stadium: Portoval; Attendance: 300; Referee: Mitja Žganec

11 December 2015 22	Zavrč	2 – 1	Krka	Zavrč
18:00 CET (UTC+01:00)	Pihler (yellow card) 71'; Vučkić 76' (o.g.); Tahiraj 85'	Report (in Slovene)	Mojstrović 5'; Vučkić (yellow card) 26'	Stadium: Zavrč Sports Park; Attendance: 550; Referee: Damir Skomina

28 February 2016 23	Krka	3 – 1	Domžale	Novo Mesto
15:00 CET (UTC+01:00)	Kostanjšek 17'; Vučkić (yellow card) 54'; Fuček 68' (pen.), 75'; Bogdan (yellow card) 79'	Report (in Slovene)	Horić (yellow card) 65'; Trajkovski (yellow card) 73'; Jarović 80'	Stadium: Portoval; Attendance: 500; Referee: Matej Jug

6 March 2016 24	Krško	3 – 0	Krka	Krško
15:00 CET (UTC+01:00)	Volarič 30'; Urbanč 48'; Đurković 63' (yellow card) 84'; Žinko (yellow card) 70'; Gregov (yellow card) 77'	Report (in Slovene)	Gliha (yellow card) 28'; Kostanjšek (yellow card) 47'; Ejup (yellow card) 58'	Stadium: Matija Gubec Stadium; Attendance: 1,250; Referee: Damir Skomina

13 March 2016 25	Krka	0 – 1	Koper	Novo Mesto
15:00 CET (UTC+01:00)	Perić (yellow card) 56'; Vučkić (yellow card) 58'; Bogdan (yellow card) 62'; Ejup (yellow card) 90+3'; Fuček (yellow card) 90+4'	Report (in Slovene)	Pavić (yellow card) 18'; Valencia (yellow card) 74'; Lokaj 78'; Tomić (yellow card) 80'	Stadium: Portoval; Attendance: 300; Referee: Slavko Vinčić

19 March 2016 26	Maribor	2 – 1	Krka	Maribor
14:55 CET (UTC+01:00)	Ibraimi (yellow card) 13'; Vršič 43', (red card) 53'; Tavares 77'; Novaković (yellow card) 85'	Report (in Slovene)	Kostanjšek 6'; Potokar (yellow card) 36'; Bogdan (yellow card) 90+3'	Stadium: Ljudski vrt Attendance: 2,800; Referee: Roman Glažar

2 April 2016 27	Krka	0 – 2	Olimpija	Novo Mesto
15:00 CEST (UTC+02:00)	Marotti (yellow card) 41'	Report (in Slovene)	Matić (yellow card) 18'; Radović 21'; Eleke 59'	Stadium: Portoval; Attendance: 500; Referee: Andrej Žnidaršič

6 April 2016 28	Krka	1 – 5	Rudar	Novo Mesto
16:00 CEST (UTC+02:00)	Welbeck (yellow card) 36'; Fuček 74'	Report (in Slovene)	Črnčič 8'; Eterović 30'; Pišek 33'; Džinić 44'; S.Babić (yellow card) 45'; Kašnik (yellow card) 74'; Grbić 89'	Stadium: Portoval; Attendance: 100; Referee: Matej Jug

10 April 2016 29	Krka	1 – 1	Celje	Novo Mesto
16:00 CEST (UTC+02:00)	Majcen (yellow card) 35'; Bogdan (yellow card) 52'; Vučkić 73'	Report (in Slovene)	Miškić (yellow card) 57'; Pišek (yellow card) 64'; Pajač 68'	Stadium: Portoval; Attendance: 400; Referee: Damir Skomina

16 April 2016 30	Gorica	1 – 0	Krka	Nova Gorica
19:00 CEST (UTC+02:00)	Mevlja (yellow card) 74'; Kapić (yellow card) 82'; Osuji 90+3'	Report (in Slovene)	Bocaccini (yellow card) 35'; Brkljača (yellow card) 37'; Kostanjšek (yellow card) 72'; Majcen (yellow card) 87'	Stadium: Nova Gorica Sports Park; Attendance: 400; Referee: Darjan Kovačič

24 April 2016 31	Krka	2 – 0	Zavrč	Novo Mesto
15:00 CEST (UTC+02:00)	Welbeck (yellow card) 44'; Dangubić (yellow card) 64', (goal) 73'; Boccaccini 75'	Report (in Slovene)	Mužek (yellow card) 34'; Antić (yellow card) 53'; Golubar (yellow card) 62'	Stadium: Portoval; Attendance: 250; Referee: Rade Obrenović

30 April 2016 32	Domžale	1 – 1	Krka	Domžale
19:00 CEST (UTC+02:00)	Šišić (yellow card) 14'; Horvat (yellow card) 53'; Mance 77'	Report (in Slovene)	Majcen (yellow card) 47'; Marotti (yellow card) 50'; Brkljača (yellow card) 84' (yellow-red card)	Stadium: Domžale Sports Park; Attendance: 350; Referee: Vojko Goričan

7 May 2016 33	Krka	0 – 0	Krško	Novo Mesto
17:00 CEST (UTC+02:00)	Vučkić (yellow card) 41'; Kostanjšek (yellow card) 67'; Potokar (yellow card) 90+3'	Report (in Slovene)	Sikošek (yellow card) 29'; Drnovšek (yellow card) 89'	Stadium: Portoval; Attendance: 600; Referee: Nejc Kajtazović

11 May 2016 34	Koper	2 – 3	Krka	Koper
19:00 CEST (UTC+02:00)	Datković 45'; Jurina 57', (red card) 90+5'; Jefthon (yellow card) 76'; Batur (yellow card) 90+3'	Report (in Slovene)	Majcen 29', 51'; Boccaccini 77'; Mojstrović (yellow card) 90+5'	Stadium: Bonifika Stadium; Attendance: 600; Referee: Matej Jug

14 May 2016 35	Krka	1 – 3	Maribor	Novo mesto
16:55 CEST (UTC+02:00)	Boccaccini (yellow card) 21'; Fuček 33', (yellow card) 57'; Brkljača (yellow card) 68'; Perić (yellow card) 74'	Report (in Slovene)	Mendy 29', 39'; Mertelj (yellow card) 64'; Dervišević 90+2'	Stadium: Portoval; Attendance: 700; Referee: Miran Bukovec

21 May 2016 36	Olimpija	3 – 0	Krka	Ljubljana
16:55 CEST (UTC+02:00)	Zajc 23'; Klinar (yellow card) 37'; Eleke 44'; Delamea Mlinar 87'	Report (in Slovene)	Ejup (yellow card) 28'; Dežmar (yellow card) 39'	Stadium: Stožice Stadium; Attendance: 13,000; Referee: Andrej Žnidaršič

=== Cup ===
==== First round ====
19 August 2015 First round	Fužinar	1 – 3	Krka	Ravne na Koroškem
16:00 CEST	Stojakovič (yellow card) 31'; Stočko 37'	Report (in Slovene)	Perić 25', 49'; Kauber (yellow card) 28'; Potokar 57'	Stadium: City Stadium; Attendance: 400; Referee: Iztok Gornjak

==== Round of 16 ====
16 September 2015 Round of 16	Rudar Velenje	3 – 2	Krka	Velenje
18:00 CEST	Knezović 37'; Babić 42'; Ihbeisheh 56'; Grgić (yellow card) 71'; Tolimir (yellow card) 83'; Kocić (yellow card) 90+3'	Report (in Slovene)	Novinić 4' (pen.); Dangubić 15'; Ejup (yellow card) 57'; Aniekan (yellow card) 73'; Kastrevec (yellow card) 75'	Stadium: Ob Jezeru City Stadium; Attendance: 600; Referee: Miran Bukovec

== Statistics ==
As of matches played 21 May 2016.

No.	Pos.	Player	Total				PrvaLiga				Cup			
No.	Pos.	Player		Goal	Yellow card	Red card		Goal	Yellow card	Red card		Goal	Yellow card	Red card
1	GK	(Slovenia) Darko Marjanović	0	0	0	0	0	0	0	0	0	0	0	0
4	DF	(Croatia) Luka Bogdan	25	0	6	1	25	0	6	1	0	0	0	0
5	DF	(Slovenia) Alen Vučkić	25	2	6	0	23	2	6	0	2	0	0	0
6	MF	(Croatia) Mario Brkljača	11	0	3	1	0	11	0	3	1	0	0	0
7	MF	(Croatia) Josip Fuček	33	7	5	0	33	7	5	0	0	0	0	0
8	DF	(Slovenia) Erik Gliha	17	1	3	1	15	1	3	1	2	0	0	0
9	FW	(Croatia) Enes Novinić	17	2	1	0	16	1	1	0	1	1	0	0
10	MF	(Slovenia) Denis Mojstrović	34	1	5	0	33	1	5	0	1	0	0	0
15	DF	(Slovenia) Leo Ejup	30	2	9	0	29	2	8	0	1	0	1	0
16	MF	(Slovenia) Miha Kostanjšek	21	2	4	0	21	2	4	0	0	0	0	0
17	DF	(Slovenia) Danijel Dežmar	21	0	3	0	20	0	3	0	1	0	0	0
18	DF	(Croatia) Bruno Marotti	34	0	9	0	33	0	9	0	1	0	0	0
19	MF	(Slovenia) Urban Kramar	9	0	0	0	7	0	0	0	2	0	0	0
20	DF	(Italy) Matteo Boccaccini	8	2	2	0	8	2	2	0	0	0	0	0
21	DF	(Nigeria) Muhammed Kabiru	3	0	0	0	3	0	0	0	0	0	0	0
22	GK	(Slovenia) Mateo Barukčič	6	0	0	0	4	0	0	0	2	0	0	0
23	MF	(Slovenia) Luka Kambič	1	0	0	0	1	0	0	0	0	0	0	0
24	MF	(Ghana) Nana Welbeck	36	3	8	0	34	3	8	0	2	0	0	0
25	FW	(Slovenia) Grega Končar	1	0	0	0	1	0	0	0	0	0	0	0
27	FW	(Croatia) Marin Perić	34	5	6	0	32	3	6	0	2	2	0	0
30	FW	(Serbia) Mladen Mrakić	0	0	0	0	0	0	0	0	0	0	0	0
31	GK	(Switzerland) Miodrag Mitrović	33	0	0	2	33	0	0	2	0	0	0	0
33	MF	(Nigeria) Favour Aniekan	12	0	1	0	11	0	0	0	1	0	1	0
43	MF	(Slovenia) Damjan Marjanović	12	0	0	0	11	0	0	0	1	0	0	0
44	FW	(Slovenia) Jan Novak	3	0	0	0	3	0	0	0	0	0	0	0
55	MF	(Slovenia) Matej Potokar	18	1	3	0	17	0	3	0	1	1	0	0
90	FW	(Croatia) Filip Dangubić	32	3	4	0	31	2	4	0	1	1	0	0
99	FW	(Slovenia) Luka Majcen	14	2	3	0	14	2	3	0	0	0	0	0
Players who left the club in Summer/Winter transfer window or on loan
–	FW	(Slovenia) Žiga Kastrevec	23	1	7	0	21	1	6	0	2	0	1	0
–	FW	(Estonia) Kevin Kauber	1	0	1	0	0	0	0	0	1	0	1	0
–	DF	(Nigeria) Jamilu Collins	14	0	4	1	13	0	4	1	1	0	0	0
–	MF	(Slovenia) Luka Cerar	1	0	0	0	0	0	0	0	1	0	0	0
–	DF	(Slovenia) Lamin Diallo	2	0	0	0	0	0	0	0	2	0	0	0
Own goals			–	1	–	–	–	0	–	–	–	0	–	–
TOTALS			–	35	93	6	–	30	89	6	–	5	4	0

=== Goalscorers ===
As of matches played 21 May 2016.

Rank	No.	Pos.	Player	PrvaLiga	Cup	Total
1	7	MF	(Croatia) Josip Fuček	7	0	7
2	27	FW	(Croatia) Marin Perić	3	2	5
3	24	MF	(Ghana) Nana Welbeck	3	0	3
3	90	FW	(Croatia) Filip Dangubić	2	1	3
5	5	DF	(Slovenia) Alen Vučkić	2	0	2
5	20	DF	(Italy) Matteo Boccaccini	2	0	2
5	15	DF	(Slovenia) Leo Ejup	2	0	2
5	16	MF	(Slovenia) Miha Kostanjšek	2	0	2
5	99	MF	(Slovenia) Luka Majcen	2	0	2
5	9	FW	(Croatia) Enes Novinić	1	1	2
11	8	DF	(Slovenia) Erik Gliha	1	0	1
11	10	MF	(Slovenia) Denis Mojstrović	1	0	1
11	–	MF	(Slovenia) Žiga Kastrevec	1	0	1
11	55	MF	(Slovenia) Matej Potokar	0	1	1
Own goals				1	0	1
TOTALS				30	5	35

== See also ==
- 2015–16 Slovenian PrvaLiga
- 2015–16 Slovenian Football Cup
