= 2015–16 ND Gorica season =

ND Gorica
2015–16 season
- President: Hari Arčon
- Head Coach: Miran Srebrnič
- Stadium: Nova Gorica Sports Park
- Slovenian League: 4th
- Slovenian Cup: First round
- Top goalscorer: League: Blessing Eleke (12); All: Blessing Eleke (12)
- Highest home attendance: 1,800 (vs Maribor and Olimpija)
- Lowest home attendance: 300 (vs Rudar and Krka)
- Average home league attendance: 731
Home colours	Away colours
- All statistics correct as of 25 May 2016.

The 2015–16 season was Gorica's 25th season in the Slovenian PrvaLiga, the Slovenian top division, since the league was created in 1991 with Gorica as one of the league's founding members. Gorica competed in the PrvaLiga and Cup. The season for the club began on 18 July 2015 and ended on 21 May 2016.

== Players ==
As of 1 March 2016

Note: Flags indicate national team as defined under FIFA eligibility rules; some limited exceptions apply. Players may hold more than one non-FIFA nationality.

No.	Pos.	Nation	Player
1	GK	SLO	Gregor Sorčan
3	DF	SLO	Uroš Celcer
4	DF	SLO	Matija Škarabot
6	DF	SLO	Miha Gregorič
7	MF	SLO	Andrej Kotnik
8	FW	BIH	Rifet Kapić
10	FW	SLO	Miran Burgič
11	FW	SLO	Sandi Arčon
14	MF	SLO	Jaka Kolenc
17	FW	NGR	Amarachi Osuji
22	GK	SLO	Jure Lipičar
23	DF	SLO	Tine Kavčič

No.	Pos.	Nation	Player
24	MF	SLO	Jan Humar
26	MF	SLO	Amel Džuzdanović
27	DF	SLO	Alen Jogan (captain)
29	DF	SLO	Jani Curk
30	FW	SLO	Leon Marinič
31	DF	SLO	Nejc Mevlja
33	FW	SLO	Marko Nunič
42	DF	SLO	Matija Boben
77	MF	SLO	Dino Martinovič
90	MF	NGR	Marshal Johnson
91	GK	SLO	Januš Štrukelj
96	FW	SLO	Tilen Nagode

Source:ND Gorica

== Competitions ==
=== Overall ===
Competition	Started round	Final position / round	First match	Last match
PrvaLiga	—	4th	19 July 2015	21 May 2016
Cup	First round	First round	19 August 2015	19 August 2015

Updated to match played 25 May 2016
Source: Competitions

=== Overview ===
Competition	Record							
Competition	Pld	W	D	L	GF	GA	GD	Win %
PrvaLiga	36	15	7	14	48	49	−1	41.67
Cup	1	0	0	1	0	1	−1	0.00
Total	37	15	7	15	48	50	−2	40.54

Last updated: 25 May 2016
Source: Competitions

=== PrvaLiga ===
==== League table ====
Pos	Team	Pld	W	D	L	GF	GA	GD	Pts	Qualification or relegation
2	Maribor	36	19	11	6	78	37	+41	68	Qualification for the Europa League second qualifying round (Note: Maribor qualified for the Europa League second qualifying round by winning the 2015–16 Slovenian Cup.)
3	Domžale	36	14	13	9	46	31	+15	55	Qualification for the Europa League first qualifying round
4	Gorica	36	15	7	14	48	49	−1	52	Qualification for the Europa League first qualifying round
5	Celje	36	11	12	13	32	46	−14	45	
6	Krško	36	10	11	15	24	48	−24	41 (Note: Krško ahead of Rudar Velenje on head-to-head record: Rudar–Krško 1–1, Krško–Rudar 0–0, Rudar–Krško 0–1, Krško–Rudar 1–1.)	

Source: Slovenian PrvaLiga (in Slovene), Soccerway
Rules for classification: 1) Points; 2) Head-to-head points; 3) Head-to-head goal difference; 4) Head-to-head goals scored; 5) Goal difference; 6) Goals scored.

==== Results summary ====
Overall								Home						Away					
Pld	W	D	L	GF	GA	GD	Pts	W	D	L	GF	GA	GD	W	D	L	GF	GA	GD
36	15	7	14	48	49	−1	52	7	3	8	20	23	−3	8	4	6	28	26	+2

Last updated: 25 May 2016.
Source: Competitive matches

==== Results by round ====
Round	1	2	3	4	5	6	7	8	9	10	11	12	13	14	15	16	17	18	19	20	21	22	23	24	25	26	27	28	29	30	31	32	33	34	35	36
Ground	A	H	A	A	H	A	H	A	H	H	A	H	H	A	H	A	H	A	A	H	A	A	H	A	H	A	H	H	A	H	H	A	H	A	H	A
Result	L	W	W	W	W	W	W	W	L	L	L	W	D	W	L	L	L	L	W	W	L	D	D	D	W	D	L	D	L	W	L	D	L	W	L	W
Position	10	6	3	1	1	1	1	1	2	2	2	2	2	2	3	4	4	4	4	4	4	4	4	4	4	4	4	4	4	4	4	4	4	4	4	4

Updated to match(es) played on 25 May 2016. Source: Competitive matches
A = Away; H = Home; W = Win; D = Draw; L = Loss

==== Matches ====
Win Draw Loss

18 July 2015 1	Olimpija	4–1	Gorica	Ljubljana
20:15 CEST (UTC+02:00)	Kapun 18'; Kronaveter 25', 68'; Krefl (yellow card) 38'; Henty (yellow card) 52'; Šporar 89'	Report (in Slovene)	Arčon 45'; Martinovič (yellow card) 46'	Stadium: Stožice Stadium; Attendance: 2,000; Referee: Davor Drečnik

24 July 2015 2	Gorica	2–1	Rudar	Nova Gorica
18:00 CEST (UTC+02:00)	Jogan (yellow card) 22'; Martinović 42'; Džuzdanović 69'; Širok (yellow card) 75'	Report (in Slovene)	Knezović (yellow card) 65'; Prašnikar 71'; S.Babić (yellow card) 75'	Stadium: Nova Gorica Sports Park; Attendance: 350; Referee: Roberto Ponis

2 August 2015 3	Krka	1–2	Gorica	Novo Mesto
18:30 CEST (UTC+02:00)	Fuček 31'; Welbeck (yellow card) 33'; Collins (red card) 78'	Report (in Slovene)	Jogan (yellow card) 40'; Džuzdanović 42', (yellow card) 78'; Širok 54'; Arčon (yellow card) 66'; Martinović (yellow card) 74'	Stadium: Portoval; Attendance: 400; Referee: Damir Skomina

7 August 2015 4	Celje	2–3	Gorica	Celje
18:30 CEST (UTC+02:00)	Esteves De Sousa 5'; M.Klemenčič (yellow card) 40'; Jogan 74' (o.g.)	Report (in Slovene)	Eleke 19', (yellow card) 53'; Širok (yellow card) 21'; Džuzdanović 69'; Arčon (yellow card) 77'; Nunič 90+2', (yellow card) 90+2'	Stadium: Arena Petrol; Attendance: 600; Referee: Slavko Vinčić

11 August 2015 5	Gorica	3–0	Zavrč	Nova Gorica
17:30 CEST (UTC+02:00)	Kolenc (yellow card) 17'; Eleke 69', 78', (yellow card) 81'; Jogan 85'	Report	Datković (yellow card) 74'	Stadium: Nova Gorica Sports Park; Attendance: 550; Referee: Marko Podgoršek

15 August 2015 6	Domžale	2–3	Gorica	Domžale
20:15 CEST (UTC+02:00)	Morel 25'; Črnic (yellow card) 41'; Horić (yellow card) 50'; Mance 58'	Report (in Slovene)	Eleke 5', 56'; Džuzdanović (yellow card) 23'; Humar (yellow card) 76'; Škarabot (yellow card) 87'; Širok 87'	Stadium: Domžale Sports Park; Attendance: 1,100; Referee: Andrej Žnidaršič

23 August 2015 7	Gorica	3–1	Krško	Nova Gorica
17:00 CEST (UTC+02:00)	Nunič 17', 28', (yellow card) 20' (yellow-red card) 62'; Džuzdanović 70'	Report (in Slovene)	Urbanč 60' (pen.); Volarič (yellow card) 70'	Stadium: Nova Gorica Sports Park; Attendance: 900; Referee: Asmir Sagrković

29 August 2015 8	Koper	1–3	Gorica	Koper
20:15 CEST (UTC+02:00)	Simčič (yellow card) 33'; Rahmanović (yellow card) 55'; Šme (yellow card) 72'; Ivančić 87'	Report (in Slovene)	Humar (yellow card) 22'; Eleke 32', 84', (yellow card) 74'; Burgič (yellow card) 27', (goal) 61'; Džuzdanović (yellow card) 72'	Stadium: Bonifika Stadium; Attendance: 900; Referee: Slavko Vinčić

20 September 2015 9	Gorica	1–4	Maribor	Nova Gorica
17:45 CEST (UTC+02:00)	Burgič 6', (yellow card) 51'	Report (in Slovene)	Mendy 12', 57'; Tavares 25'; Stojanović (yellow card) 53'; Bohar 77'	Stadium: Nova Gorica Sports Park; Attendance: 1,800; Referee: Damir Skomina

19 September 2015 10	Gorica	0–3	Olimipja	Nova Gorica
17:45 CEST (UTC+02:00)	Jogan (yellow card) 44'	Report (in Slovene)	Kronaveter 45' (pen.), 89'; Bajrić (yellow card) 58'; Kapun 79'	Stadium: Nova Gorica Sports Park; Attendance: 1,800; Referee: Nejc Kajtazović

23 September 2015 11	Rudar	1–0	Gorica	Velenje
16:00 CEST (UTC+02:00)	Kašnik (yellow card) 13'; M.Babić 24'; Kocić (yellow card) 58'	Report (in Slovene)	Johnson (yellow card) 41'	Stadium: Ob Jezeru City Stadium; Attendance: 650; Referee: Mitja Žganec

27 September 2015 12	Gorica	2–0	Krka	Nova Gorica
16:00 CEST (UTC+02:00)	Burgič 82'; Eleke 90+4', (yellow card) 90+4'	Report (in Slovene)	Bogdan (yellow card) 65'; Mitrović (red card) 65'; Gliha (yellow card) 73'	Stadium: Nova Gorica Sports Park; Attendance: 500; Referee: Slavko Vinčić

3 October 2015 13	Gorica	1–1	Celje	Nova Gorica
16:00 CEST (UTC+02:00)	Širok (yellow card) 37'; Celcer (yellow card) 90+2'; Jogan (red card) 90+2'; Škarabot 90+5'	Report (in Slovene)	Miškić 6'; Pajač (yellow card) 76'	Stadium: Nova Gorica Sports Park; Attendance: 560; Referee: Rade Obrenović

16 October 2015 14	Zavrč	1–2	Gorica	Zavrč
19:00 CEST (UTC+02:00)	Batrović 66'	Report (in Slovene)	Burgič 11'; Eleke 32'; Džuzdanović (yellow card) 38'; Kavčič (yellow card) 64'; Škarabot (yellow card) 81'; Martinović (yellow card) 88'	Stadium: Zavrč Sports Park; Attendance: 700; Referee: Dejan Balažič

25 October 2015 15	Gorica	0–1	Domžale	Nova Gorica
17:45 CET (UTC+01:00)	Burgič (yellow card) 35'; Škarabot (yellow card) 61'; Širok (yellow card) 69'	Report (in Slovene)	Miha Blažič 83'; Črnic (yellow card) 87'	Stadium: Nova Gorica Sports Park; Attendance: 600; Referee: Slavko Vinčić

30 October 2015 16	Krško	1–0	Gorica	Krško
19:00 CET (UTC+01:00)	Štefanac 17'; Jakolić (yellow card) 66'; Petranić (yellow card) 81'; Drnovšek (yellow card) 90+3'; Blažinčič (yellow card) 90+4'	Report (in Slovene)	Eleke (yellow card) 70'	Stadium: Matija Gubec Stadium; Attendance: 900; Referee: Andrej Žnidaršič

8 November 2015 17	Gorica	1–2	Koper	Nova Gorica
17:45 CET (UTC+01:00)	Eleke 25'; Celcer (yellow card) 62'	Report (in Slovene)	Memolla 19', (yellow card) 88'; Pavić (yellow card) 66'; Šimurina (yellow card) 79'; Štromajer 90+2'	Stadium: Nova Gorica Sports Park; Attendance: 550; Referee: Dragoslav Perić

25 November 2015 18	Maribor	4–2	Gorica	Maribor
17:30 CET (UTC+01:00)	Ibraimi 21'; Sallalich 41'; Filipović (yellow card) 46'; Jogan 50' (o.g.); Bajde 61'	Report (in Slovene)	Kotnik (yellow card) 37'; Eleke 46'; Arčon 90'	Stadium: Ljudski vrt Attendance: 2,000; Referee: Dejan Balažič

29 November 2015 19	Olimpija	0–2	Gorica	Ljubljana
17:30 CET (UTC+01:00)	Kronaveter (yellow card) 35'	Report (in Slovene)	Džuzdanović 27'; Cvijanović (yellow card) 59' (goal) 90'; Širok (yellow card) 83'	Stadium: Stožice Stadium; Attendance: 1,200; Referee: Damir Skomina

2 December 2015 20	Gorica	1–0	Rudar	Nova Gorica
13:00 CET (UTC+01:00)	Mevlja (yellow card) 32'; Johnson (yellow card) 67'; Eleke 86'; Celcer (yellow card) 88'	Report (in Slovene)	M.Babić (yellow card) 11'; S.Babić (yellow card) 62'	Stadium: Nova Gorica Sports Park; Attendance: 400; Referee: Nejc Kajtazović

6 December 2015 21	Krka	1–0	Gorica	Novo Mesto
13:00 CET (UTC+01:00)	Marotti (yellow card) 25'; Collins (yellow card) 37'; Ejup (yellow card) 47'; Kastrevec (yellow card) 75'; Gliha 86'	Report (in Slovene)	Arčon (yellow card) 13'; Johnson (yellow card) 40' (yellow-red card)	Stadium: Portoval; Attendance: 150; Referee: Mitja Žganec

12 December 2015 22	Gorica	2–2	Celje	Nova Gorica
15:00 CET (UTC+01:00)	Širok 48'; Jogan 74'	Report (in Slovene)	Firer 13', 67'; Osman Ali (yellow card) 41'; Esteves De Sousa (yellow card) 42'	Stadium: Nova Gorica Sports Park; Attendance: 620; Referee: Andrej Žnidaršič

27 February 2016 23	Gorica	2–2	Zavrč	Nova Gorica
15:00 CET (UTC+01:00)	Osuji 19'; Burgić (yellow card) 35'; Jogan (yellow card) 36'; Celcer (red card) 43'; Nunič 76'	Report (in Slovene)	Batrović 22', 36' (pen.); Tahiraj (yellow card) 43'; Kokorović (yellow card) 81'	Stadium: Nova Gorica Sports Park; Attendance: 350; Referee: Vojko Goričan

6 March 2016 24	Domžale	1–1	Gorica	Domžale
16:55 CET (UTC+01:00)	Trajkovski (yellow card) 26'; Črnic 51'; Zec (yellow card) 90'	Report (in Slovene)	Johnson (yellow card) 17'; Humar 59'; Boben (yellow card) 89'	Stadium: Domžale Sports Park; Attendance: 700; Referee: Bojan Mertik

12 March 2016 25	Gorica	1–0	Krško	Nova Gorica
15:00 CET (UTC+01:00)	Jogan (yellow card) 24'; Arčon (yellow card) 26'; Johnson (yellow card) 33'; Burgič 65'	Report (in Slovene)	Čeh (yellow card) 57'	Stadium: Nova Gorica Sports Park; Attendance: 450; Referee: Andrej Žnidaršič

18 March 2016 26	Koper	1–1	Gorica	Koper
17:00 CET (UTC+01:00)	Biljan (yellow card) 14'; Jurina (yellow card) 43', (goal) 90+4'; Batur (yellow card) 44'	Report (in Slovene)	Celcer (yellow card) 34'; Burgič (yellow card) 44'; Gregorič 53'; Kapić (yellow card) 66'	Stadium: Bonifika Stadium; Attendance: 1,000; Referee: Nejc Kajtazović

2 April 2016 27	Gorica	0–2	Maribor	Nova Gorica
16:55 CEST (UTC+02:00)	Nunič (yellow card) 86'; Kolenc (yellow card) 88'	Report (in Slovene)	Mendy 59', 70'	Stadium: Nova Gorica Sports Park; Attendance: 1,200; Referee: Dejan Balažič

6 April 2016 28	Gorica	1–1	Olimipja	Nova Gorica
16:00 CEST (UTC+02:00)	Kavčič (yellow card) 50'; Kotnik 80'; Kapić (yellow card) 82'; Gregorič (yellow card) 84'; Martinovič (yellow card) 89'	Report (in Slovene)	Kronaveter 40' (pen.); Fink (yellow card) 54'; Zajc (yellow card) 76'	Stadium: Nova Gorica Sports Park; Attendance: 1,300; Referee: Damir Skomina

9 April 2016 29	Rudar	1–0	Gorica	Velenje
19:00 CEST (UTC+02:00)	Jahić 41', (yellow card) 50'; Črnčič (yellow card) 90+2'	Report (in Slovene)	Burgič (yellow card) 44'; Mevlja (yellow card) 89'	Stadium: Ob Jezeru City Stadium; Attendance: 600; Referee: Slavko Vinčić

16 April 2016 30	Gorica	1–0	Krka	Nova Gorica
15:00 CEST (UTC+02:00)	Mevlja (yellow card) 74'; Kapić (yellow card) 82'; Osuji 90+3'	Report (in Slovene)	Bocaccini (yellow card) 35'; Brkljača (yellow card) 37'; Kostanjšek (yellow card) 72'; Majcen (yellow card) 87'	Stadium: Nova Gorica Sports Park; Attendance: 300; Referee: Darjan Kovačič

23 April 2016 31	Gorica	1–2	Celje	Nova Gorica
19:00 CEST (UTC+02:00)	Kavčič 40'; Curk (yellow card) 49'; Humar (yellow card) 83'	Report (in Slovene)	Podlogar 25', 62'; Kous (yellow card) 85'; Kotnik (yellow card) 90+3'	Stadium: Nova Gorica Sports Park; Attendance: 500; Referee: Mitja Žganec

29 April 2016 32	Zavrč	1–1	Gorica	Zavrč
19:00 CEST (UTC+02:00)	Golubar 31'; Jakšić (yellow card) 36'; Karamatić (yellow card) 90+3'	Report (in Slovene)	Kapić (yellow card) 29', (goal) 57'	Stadium: Zavrč Sports Park; Attendance: 300; Referee: Roberto Ponis

8 May 2016 33	Gorica	0–2	Domžale	Nova Gorica
16:55 CEST (UTC+02:00)	Humar (yellow card) 24'	Report (in Slovene)	Črnic 44'; Mance 69'	Stadium: Nova Gorica Sports Park; Attendance: 500; Referee: Slavko Vinčić

11 May 2016 34	Krško	0–2	Gorica	Krško
18:00 CEST (UTC+02:00)	Volarič (yellow card) 53'; Sikošek (yellow card) 59'	Report (in Slovene)	Kotnik 11'; Celcer (yellow card) 30'; Jogan (yellow card) 53'; Boben (yellow card) 89'	Stadium: Matija Gubec Stadium; Attendance: 1,000; Referee: Damir Skomina

14 May 2016 35	Gorica	0–1	Koper	Nova Gorica
16:55 CEST (UTC+02:00)	Boben (yellow card) 44'	Report (in Slovene)	Horvat 34'; Biljan (yellow card) 79'; Tomić (yellow card) 90+4'	Stadium: Nova Gorica Sports Park; Attendance: 600; Referee: Bojan Mertik

21 May 2016 36	Maribor	2–3	Gorica	Maribor
16:55 CEST (UTC+02:00)	Bajde 9', 38', (yellow card) 30'	Report (in Slovene)	Burgič 14'; Kotnik 82'; Osuji 87'; Škarabot (yellow card) 90+2'	Stadium: Ljudski vrt Attendance: 2,500; Referee: Rade Obrenović

=== Cup ===
==== First round ====
Win Draw Loss

19 August 2015 First round	Mura	1–0	Gorica	Murska Sobota
16:00 CEST	Toth 29', (yellow card) 57'; Slana (yellow card) 72'; Kisilak (yellow card) 89'	Report (in Slovene)	Eleke (yellow card) 55'	Stadium: Fazanerija City Stadium; Attendance: 800; Referee: Alen Borošak

== Statistics ==
=== Squad statistics ===
As of matches played 21 May 2016.

No.	Pos.	Player	Total				PrvaLiga				Cup			
No.	Pos.	Player		Goal	Yellow card	Red card		Goal	Yellow card	Red card		Goal	Yellow card	Red card
1	GK	(Slovenia) Gregor Sorčan	35	0	0	0	35	0	0	0	0	0	0	0
3	DF	(Slovenia) Uroš Celcer	32	0	6	1	31	0	6	1	1	0	0	0
4	DF	(Slovenia) Matija Škarabot	26	1	4	0	25	1	4	0	1	0	0	0
6	DF	(Slovenia) Miha Gregorič	14	1	1	0	13	1	1	0	1	0	0	0
7	MF	(Slovenia) Andrej Kotnik	18	3	1	0	18	3	1	0	0	0	0	0
8	FW	(Bosnia and Herzegovina) Rifet Kapić	12	1	4	0	12	1	4	0	0	0	0	0
10	FW	(Slovenia) Miran Burgič	33	6	6	0	32	6	6	0	1	0	0	0
11	FW	(Slovenia) Sandi Arčon	29	2	4	0	29	2	4	0	0	0	0	0
14	MF	(Slovenia) Jaka Kolenc	23	0	2	0	23	0	2	0	0	0	0	0
17	FW	(Nigeria) Bede Amarachi Osuji	14	3	0	0	13	3	0	0	1	0	0	0
22	GK	(Slovenia) Jure Lipičar	0	0	0	0	0	0	0	0	0	0	0	0
23	DF	(Slovenia) Tine Kavčič	27	1	2	0	26	1	2	0	1	0	0	0
24	MF	(Slovenia) Jan Humar	25	1	4	0	25	1	4	0	0	0	0	0
26	MF	(Slovenia) Amel Džuzdanović	20	5	4	0	19	5	4	0	1	0	0	0
27	DF	(Slovenia) Alen Jogan	27	2	6	1	26	2	6	1	1	0	0	0
29	DF	(Slovenia) Jani Curk	2	0	1	0	2	0	1	0	0	0	0	0
30	FW	(Slovenia) Leo Marinič	1	0	0	0	1	0	0	0	0	0	0	0
31	DF	(Slovenia) Nejc Mevlja	13	0	3	0	13	0	3	0	0	0	0	0
33	FW	(Slovenia) Marko Nunič	28	5	3	1	27	5	3	1	1	0	0	0
42	DF	(Slovenia) Matija Boben	9	0	3	0	9	0	3	0	0	0	0	0
77	MF	(Slovenia) Dino Martinovič	29	1	4	0	28	1	4	0	1	0	0	0
90	MF	(Nigeria) Marshal Johnson	20	0	5	1	19	0	5	1	1	0	0	0
91	GK	(Slovenia) Januš Štrukelj	3	0	0	0	2	0	0	0	1	0	0	0
96	FW	(Slovenia) Tilen Nagode	17	0	0	0	16	0	0	0	1	0	0	0
Players who left the club in Summer/Winter transfer window or on loan
–	MF	(Slovenia) Goran Cvijanovič	9	1	1	0	9	1	1	0	0	0	0	0
–	FW	(Nigeria) Blessing Eleke	20	12	6	0	19	12	5	0	1	0	1	0
–	DF	(Slovenia) Matija Širok	21	3	5	0	21	3	5	0	0	0	0	0
Own goals			–	0	–	–	–	0	–	–	–	0	–	–
TOTALS			–	48	75	4	–	48	74	4	–	0	1	0

=== Goalscorers ===
As of matches played 21 May 2016.

Rank	No.	Pos.	Player	PrvaLiga	Cup	Total
1	–	FW	(Nigeria) Blessing Eleke	12	0	12
2	10	FW	(Slovenia) Miran Burgič	6	0	6
3	26	MF	(Slovenia) Amel Džuzdanović	5	0	5
3	33	FW	(Slovenia) Marko Nunič	5	0	5
5	7	MF	(Slovenia) Andrej Kotnik	3	0	3
5	17	FW	(Nigeria) Bede Amarachi Osuji	3	0	3
5	–	DF	(Slovenia) Matija Širok	3	0	3
8	11	FW	(Slovenia) Sandi Arčon	2	0	2
8	27	DF	(Slovenia) Alen Jogan	2	0	2
10	4	DF	(Slovenia) Matija Škarabot	1	0	1
10	6	DF	(Slovenia) Miha Gregorič	1	0	1
10	8	FW	(Bosnia and Herzegovina) Rifet Kapić	1	0	1
10	23	DF	(Slovenia) Tine Kavčič	1	0	1
10	24	MF	(Slovenia) Jan Humar	1	0	1
10	77	MF	(Slovenia) Dino Martinovič	1	0	1
10	–	MF	(Slovenia) Goran Cvijanovič	1	0	1
Own goals				0	0	0
TOTALS				48	0	48

== See also ==
- 2015–16 Slovenian PrvaLiga
- 2015–16 Slovenian Football Cup
