= Daniele Bazzoffia =

Italian footballer (born 1988)

Personal information
- Full name: Daniele Bazzoffia
- Date of birth: 11 June 1988 (age 38)
- Place of birth: Assisi, Italy
- Height: 1.71 m (5 ft 7 in)
- Position: Forward

Team information
- Current team: Rivo Subasio

Youth career
- Perugia
- 2005–2007: Arezzo

Senior career*
| Years | Team | Apps | (Gls) |
| 2007–2010 | Arezzo | 5 | (0) |
| 2007–2008 | → Grosseto (loan) | 0 | (0) |
| 2008 | → Sansovino (loan) | 11 | (1) |
| 2008–2009 | → Gubbio (loan) | 30 | (3) |
| 2010–2012 | Gubbio | 46 | (5) |
| 2012–2014 | Parma | 0 | (0) |
| 2012–2013 | → Gubbio (loan) | 24 | (1) |
| 2013–2014 | → Gorica (loan) | 29 | (5) |
| 2015 | Cittadella | 8 | (0) |
| 2015 | Olhanense | 10 | (2) |
| 2016 | Pontedera | 16 | (0) |
| 2016–2018 | Pro Piacenza | 43 | (3) |
| 2018 | Gubbio | 7 | (0) |
| 2018–2019 | Prato | 25 | (2) |
| 2019–2024 | ASD Cannara | 0 | (0) |
| 2024- | Rivo Subasio | 0 | (0) |

International career
| 2005 | Italy U18 | 2 | (0) |
| 2007 | Italy U19 | 1 | (0) |
- * Club domestic league appearances and goals as of 2 October 2018

Daniele Bazzoffia (born 11 June 1988) is an Italian professional footballer who plays as a forward for Rivo Subasio.

== Career ==
=== Arezzo ===
Bazzoffia was a player for Perugia until the club was folded. He joined Arezzo. Arezzo relegated from the Serie B in 2007. In August 2007 Bazzoffia, Simone Bernicchi, Matteo Fasciani and Ernesto Terra were signed by Serie B club Grosseto in temporary deals. The club also signed Mirko Barbagli and Angelo Di Nardo outright in August; Walter Bressan in temporary deal in July. In January 2008, Bazzoffia and Bernicchi were moved to Sansovino.

Bazzoffia spent 2008–09 season with the fourth division club Gubbio. In 2009 Bazzoffia returned to Arezzo. The club folded in 2010.

=== Gubbio ===
Bazzoffia spent two seasons with Gubbio, winning promotion to Serie B in 2011. He signed a new two-year contract in March 2012. Gubbio relegated back to the third division in 2012.

=== Parma ===
On 2 August 2012, Bazzoffia moved to Parma on a permanent deal for undisclosed fee. On 31 August 2012, he moved back to Gubbio on loan, along with Francesco Pambianchi. Excluding Bazzoffia, Parma had paid a total of €1,143,000 to Gubbio in 2012–13 season, for signing Mário Rui (€595,000) as well as performance bonuses (Italian: premi di valorizzazione) for the loan of Alessio Manzoni (€205,000), Pietro Baccolo (€200,000) and Jacopo Galimberti (€143,000) to Gubbio.

On 1 July 2013, Bazzoffia was signed by Slovenian club Gorica along with Bright Addae, Uroš Celcer, Massimo Coda, Alex Cordaz, Sebestyén Ihrig-Farkas, Alen Jogan, Gianluca Lapadula, Floriano Vanzo and Fabio Lebran (Crotone/Parma). The deals were finalized on 3 July.

=== Olhanense ===
On 2 August 2014, Bazzoffia was signed by Portuguese side Olhanense, with Lucas Souza moved to opposite direction.

=== ASD Cannara ===
After having played for Prato since September 2017, Bazzoffia joined ASD Cannara ahead of the 2019/20 season.
