= Sebestyén Ihrig-Farkas =

Hungarian footballer (born 1994)

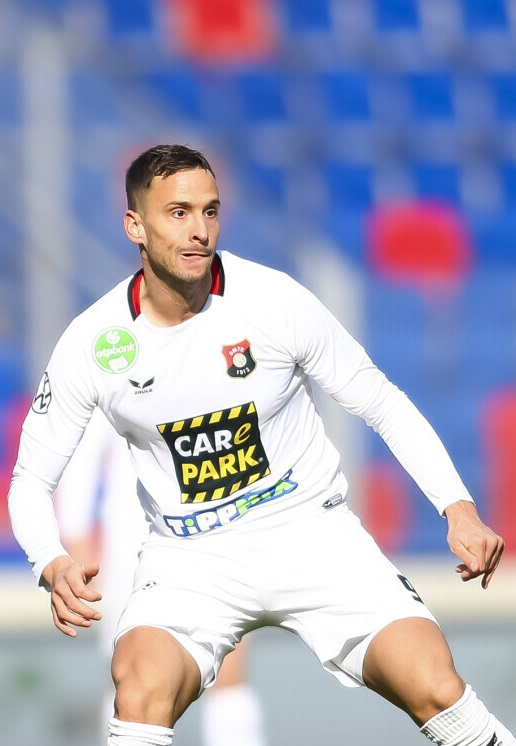
- Ihrig-Farkas playing for Budafok in 2021

Personal information
- Date of birth: 28 January 1994 (age 32)
- Place of birth: Budapest, Hungary
- Height: 1.88 m (6 ft 2 in)
- Position: Midfielder

Team information
- Current team: Honvéd
- Number: 9

Senior career*
Years	Team	Apps	(Gls)
2011–2012	Honvéd II	3	(0)
2012–2014	Parma	0	(0)
2013–2014	→ Gorica (loan)	3	(0)
2014–2016	Honvéd	6	(0)
2014–2016	→ Honvéd II	16	(5)
2016	Kozármisleny	13	(3)
2016–2017	Békéscsaba	7	(0)
2017–2022	Budafok	102	(18)
2022–2024	Vasas	31	(6)
2024	→ BVSC-Zugló (loan)	11	(3)
2024–	Honvéd	15	(3)
- * Club domestic league appearances and goals as of 20 January 2026

Sebestyén Ihrig-Farkas (born 28 January 1994) is a Hungarian professional footballer who plays as a midfielder for Nemzeti Bajnokság II club Honvéd.

== Biography ==
Born in Budapest, capital of Hungary, Ihrig-Farkas played 3 times for the second team of Honvéd in Nemzeti Bajnokság II. On 31 January 2012, Ihrig-Farkas moved to Italian club Parma in temporary deal. On 31 August 2012, he was signed outright. Ihrig-Farkas was a player of the reserve team for 1 1/2 seasons.

On 1 July 2013, Ihrig-Farkas was farmed to Gorica along with Bright Addae, Daniele Bazzoffia, Uroš Celcer, Massimo Coda, Alex Cordaz, Alen Jogan, Gianluca Lapadula, Floriano Vanzo and Fabio Lebran (Crotone/Parma). The deals were finalized on 3 July. During his stay he received a red card for injuring Matej Mavrič. In late January 2014 Ihrig-Farkas left the club.

On 30 January 2022, Ihrig-Farkas signed a 1.5-year contract with Vasas.

== Career statistics ==
As of 15 May 2021.

Appearances and goals by club, season and competition
Club	Season	League			Cup		Continental		Other		Total	
Club	Season	Division	Apps	Goals	Apps	Goals	Apps	Goals	Apps	Goals	Apps	Goals
Honvéd II	2011–12	Nemzeti Bajnokság II	3	0	—		—		—		3	0
Honvéd II	2014–15	Nemzeti Bajnokság III	9	2	—		—		—		9	2
Honvéd II	2015–16	Nemzeti Bajnokság III	7	3	—		—		—		7	3
Honvéd II	Total		19	5	0	0	0	0	0	0	19	5
Honvéd	2014–15	Nemzeti Bajnokság I	4	0	0	0	—		6	2	10	2
Honvéd	2015–16	Nemzeti Bajnokság I	2	0	2	1	—		—		4	1
Honvéd	Total		6	0	2	1	0	0	6	2	14	3
Kozármisleny	2015–16	Nemzeti Bajnokság III	13	3	1	0	—		—		14	3
Békéscsaba	2016–17	Nemzeti Bajnokság II	7	0	1	0	—		—		8	0
Budafok	2016–17	Nemzeti Bajnokság III	11	2	5	0	—		—		16	2
Budafok	2017–18	Nemzeti Bajnokság II	29	4	3	2	—		—		32	6
Budafok	2018–19	Nemzeti Bajnokság II	8	2	0	0	—		—		8	2
Budafok	2019–20	Nemzeti Bajnokság II	18	3	2	0	—		—		20	3
Budafok	2020–21	Nemzeti Bajnokság I	28	5	5	5	—		—		33	10
Budafok	Total		94	16	15	7	0	0	0	0	109	23
Career total			139	24	19	8	0	0	6	2	164	34
