= Gianluca Lapadula =

Footballer (born 1990)

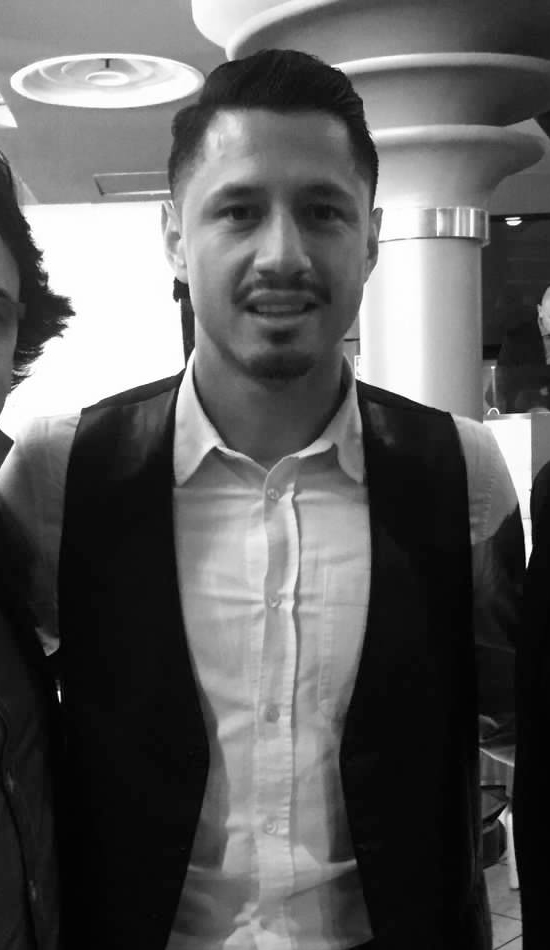
- Lapadula in 2016

Personal information
- Full name: Gianluca Lapadula Vargas
- Birth name: Gianluca Lapadula
- Date of birth: 7 February 1990 (age 36)
- Place of birth: Turin, Italy
- Height: 1.78 m (5 ft 10 in)
- Position: Striker

Team information
- Current team: Universitario de Deportes
- Number: 18

Youth career
- 1996–2004: Juventus
- 2004–2007: Collegno Paradiso
- 2006–2007: → Treviso (loan)

Senior career*
Years	Team	Apps	(Gls)
2007–2008	Pro Vercelli	4	(0)
2008–2009	Ivrea	18	(0)
2009–2012	Parma	0	(0)
2010–2011	→ Atletico Roma (loan)	0	(0)
2011	→ Ravenna (loan)	7	(1)
2011–2012	→ San Marino Calcio (loan)	35	(24)
2012–2013	Cesena	9	(0)
2013	→ Frosinone (loan)	6	(0)
2013–2015	Parma	0	(0)
2013–2014	→ Gorica (loan)	28	(11)
2014–2015	→ Teramo (loan)	38	(21)
2015–2016	Pescara	40	(27)
2016–2018	AC Milan	27	(8)
2017–2018	→ Genoa (loan)	28	(6)
2018–2020	Genoa	8	(1)
2019–2020	→ Lecce (loan)	25	(11)
2020–2022	Benevento	58	(19)
2022–2025	Cagliari	70	(24)
2025–2026	Spezia	31	(9)
2026–	Universitario	16	(9)

International career^{‡}
2017	Italy B	1	(3)
2020–	Peru	45	(11)
- * Club domestic league appearances and goals as of 22:31, 9 November 2026 (UTC) ‡ National team caps and goals as of 22:14, 13 November 2026 (UTC)

Gianluca Lapadula Vargas (born 7 February 1990) is a professional footballer who plays as a striker for Liga 1 club Universitario de Deportes. Born in Italy, he represents the Peru national team.

In a journeyman club career, Lapadula has made over 100 appearances in both Serie A and Serie B, representing Milan, Genoa, Lecce, Benevento and Cagliari in the former. He was the top scorer in Serie B for Pescara in 2015–16 and Cagliari in 2022–23.

Having previously been called up by Italy, Lapadula made his debut for Peru in 2020 and represented the country at the Copa América in 2021 and 2024, helping them to fourth place in the former.

== Early life ==
Lapadula was born in Turin in Piedmont, Italy on 7 February 1990, to an Italian father from Apulia, Gianfranco Lapadula, and a Peruvian mother, Blanca Aida Vargas Higinio. He has a brother named Davide, who was also a forward in the lower amateur leagues.

Lapadula is nicknamed Lapagol in Italy, and El Bambino in Peru.

== Club career ==
=== Early career ===
Lapadula began his career with Juventus before being released in 2004 because he was not doing well in his studies. After that he moved to Collegno Paradiso, then left on loan to Treviso in 2006. He returned to Piedmont for Serie C2 side Pro Vercelli on 31 August 2007. He played for the reserve team. In the 2008–09 season, he left for Lega Pro Seconda Divisione (ex–Serie C2) side Ivrea, and was selected to the Lega Pro 2nd Div. A representative team for Lega Pro Quadrangular Tournament and scored a goal against 2nd Div. C representative team in the third place match. Eventually, Group A finished third. In August 2009 he was signed by Parma and spent one season with their Primavera team. In July 2010, he left for Atletico Roma.

==== Loans to Atletico Roma and Cesena ====
Lapadula made his debut for Atletico Roma on 8 August 2010, in the Coppa Italia preliminary round, lost in extra time (2–1). In January 2011, he left for Ravenna. He concluded the 2011–12 season as the top-scorer in Group A with 24 goals.

On 15 June 2012, Lapadula joined Serie B club Cesena in co-ownership, signing a five-year contract. Lapadula failed to play regularly for Cesena, and on 8 January 2013, he was signed by Frosinone. In July 2013, the co-ownership between Cesena and Parma was resolved, and Lapadula returned to Parma.

==== Loans to Gorica and Teramo ====
Lapadula was loaned to Slovenian club ND Gorica on 1 July, along with Bright Addae, Daniele Bazzoffia, Uroš Celcer, Massimo Coda, Alex Cordaz, Sebestyén Ihrig-Farkas, Alen Jogan, Floriano Vanzo and Fabio Lebran. The deals were finalised on 12 July. He helped the club win the Slovenian Football Cup, scoring twice away to Aluminij in the second leg of the quarter-finals (3–1), and once more in a 2–1 home win over Rudar Velenje in the semi-finals.

In July 2014 he was loaned to Teramo, where he scored 21 goals and helped the club achieve promotion to Serie B, then cancelled in August 2015 by the final judgement of the Italian Football Federation, due to match-fixing on the part of the President of Teramo, Luciano Campitellii, in the penultimate round of the league in the match against Savona.

=== Pescara ===
After the bankruptcy of Parma, Lapadula was released on a free transfer, and in July 2015 he was signed by Pescara in Serie B on a four-year contract. In the 2015–16 season, he scored 30 goals in 43 appearances (including three goals in as many appearances in the playoffs), without scoring any penalties, earning the honour of top scorer in the Italian second division.

=== AC Milan ===
On 24 June 2016, Lapadula passed his medical test with AC Milan, who reportedly paid Pescara €9 million plus bonus for the transfer, while the player signed a five-year deal. His transfer drew comparisons with that of Gianni Comandini, who had also been signed by Milan as a "number 9" in 2000, primarily due to his goalscoring success in Serie B and without any prior Serie A experience. He made his debut for Milan on 27 August, coming on as an 86th-minute substitute for Suso during a 4–2 loss away against Napoli. He scored his first goal for Milan and in Serie A on 6 November in the 2–1 away victory against Palermo, three minutes after coming on as a substitute for Carlos Bacca. On 26 November, Lapadula scored his first brace in Serie A in a 4–1 away victory against Empoli. He finished the 2016–17 season with 8 goals in 27 games, two of which were scored from a penalty spot.

=== Genoa ===
On 18 July 2017, Lapadula moved to Genoa, on a one-season loan with an obligation to make the deal permanent. The total transfer fee was €13 million (€2 million loan + €11 million for outright) which was Genoa's most expensive signing of all-time.

Lapadula scored 6 goals in 28 games in the 2017–18 Serie A. The following season, he played only eight league games, scoring once in a 1–1 draw with SPAL on 28 April 2019.

On 12 July 2019, Lapadula was loaned to Serie A newcomers Lecce. He scored 11 goals in the 2019–20 Serie A season, including two on 9 February in a 3–2 win at fellow southerners Napoli.

=== Benevento ===
On 2 September 2020, Lapadula joined Benevento on a three-year contract, for a reported fee of €4 million. He missed only one game of the 2020–21 Serie A season and scored eight goals, but his team were relegated.

Lapadula scored a hat-trick on 21 September 2021 as Benevento defeated Cittadella 4–1. The team finished 7th and qualified for the play-offs, where he scored the only goal in the preliminary round away to Ascoli, repeating the feat at home to Pisa in the semi-final first leg.

=== Cagliari ===
On 26 July 2022, Lapadula joined Cagliari on a three-year contract. Arriving after the departure of João Pedro, he came for a reported transfer fee of €1.5 million on a salary of €1 million plus bonuses. With 21 goals in 36 games, he was the top scorer and Player of the Season in the 2022–23 Serie B. In the playoffs, he scored twice in the space of four first-half minutes in a 2–1 win in the preliminary round against Venezia, a late penalty in a 3–2 comeback win in the semi-finals against former club Parma, and an early goal in the eventual final win over Bari.

After a right-ankle injury in June 2023, Lapadula did not return until November.

=== Spezia ===
On 31 January 2025, Lapadula returned to the Italian second tier, joining Spezia on a free transfer.

== International career ==
Lapadula was eligible to play for Italy and Peru as a result of his family background. He had received a call-up by Peru for the Copa América Centenario but had not officially decided which international side to represent at the time. On 7 November 2016, he was called up to the Italy senior squad for the first time for a 2018 FIFA World Cup qualification match against Liechtenstein and a friendly match against Germany, replacing the injured Napoli forward Manolo Gabbiadini.

On 31 May 2017, Lapadula scored a hat-trick for the Italy B team in a friendly against San Marino.

On 30 October 2020, Lapadula was called-up by Ricardo Gareca to the Peru senior team for the first time, for 2022 FIFA World Cup qualification matches against Chile and Argentina. He made his debut on 13 November, as a 60th-minute substitute in a 2–0 loss away to Chile.

Lapadula scored his first senior international goal for Peru on 23 June 2021 in a 2–2 draw against Ecuador in the first round of the 2021 Copa América, later also assisting André Carrillo's goal. On 2 July, Lapadula scored once and contributed to Gustavo Gómez's own goal in a 3–3 draw against Paraguay in the quarter-finals of the competition, later also netting his nation's first penalty in the resulting 4–3 penalty shoot-out victory. On 9 July, he scored Peru's second goal in a 3–2 loss to Colombia in the third-place match of the tournament.

In qualification for the 2022 FIFA World Cup, Lapadula scored the opening goals of wins over Bolivia, Venezuela and Paraguay, though his team did not qualify.

== Style of play ==
"I'm a player who never gives up on a loose ball, always fighting even if the game seems lost. This is my character, it's never say die. – As I said before I am a full-on player."

— Lapadula being asked to describe his style of play in an interview with SoccerBible.

As a forward, Lapadula is a physically strong striker known for his work rate and temperament. His versatility allows him to play as a centre-forward or adapt to other roles, including second striker or winger on either flank, supported by his technical skills and ability to both score and assist goals. An accurate finisher, he has a strong left foot, and an eye for goal.

== Career statistics ==
=== Club ===
As of match played 19 September 2026

Appearances and goals by club, season and competition
Club	Season	League			National cup (Note: Includes Coppa Italia, Slovenian Cup)		Other		Total	
Club	Season	Division	Apps	Goals	Apps	Goals	Apps	Goals	Apps	Goals
Atletico Roma (loan)	2010–11	Serie C1	0	0	1	0	–		1	0
Ravenna (loan)	2010–11	Serie C1	7	1	0	0	–		7	1
San Marino (loan)	2011–12	Serie C2	35	24	0	0	–		35	24
Cesena	2012–13	Serie B	9	0	2	1	–		11	1
Frosinone (loan)	2012–13	Serie C1	6	0	0	0	–		6	0
Gorica (loan)	2013–14	1. SNL	28	11	4	3	–		32	14
Teramo (loan)	2014–15	Lega Pro	38	21	1	2	2	1	41	24
Pescara	2015–16	Serie B	40	27	2	0	4 (Note: Appearance(s) in Serie B promotion play-offs)	3	46	30
Milan	2016–17	Serie A	27	8	1	0	1 (Note: Appearance in Supercoppa Italiana)	0	29	8
Genoa (loan)	2017–18	Serie A	28	6	1	0	–		29	6
Genoa	2018–19	Serie A	8	1	1	1	–		9	2
Lecce (loan)	2019–20	Serie A	25	11	2	2	–		27	13
Benevento	2020–21	Serie A	37	8	0	0	–		37	8
Benevento	2021–22	Serie B	21	11	1	0	3	2	25	13
Benevento	Total		58	19	1	0	3	2	62	21
Cagliari	2022–23	Serie B	36	21	2	1	5	4	43	26
Cagliari	2023–24	Serie A	22	3	1	1	–		23	4
Cagliari	2024–25	Serie A	12	0	3	1	–		15	1
Cagliari	Total		70	24	6	3	5	4	81	31
Spezia	2024–25	Serie B	13	4	–		1	0	14	4
Spezia	2025–26	Serie B	17	5	1	1	–		18	6
Spezia	Total		30	9	1	1	1	0	32	10
Universitario	2026	Liga 1	10	6	–		–		10	6
Career total			419	168	23	13	16	10	458	191

=== International ===
As of match played 13 November 2026

Appearances and goals by national team and year
National team	Year	Apps	Goals
Peru	2020	2	0
Peru	2021	15	5
Peru	2022	7	3
Peru	2023	5	0
Peru	2024	11	1
Peru	2025	2	0
Peru	2026	3	2
Total		45	11

Scores and results list Peru's goal tally first, score column indicates score after each Lapadula goal.

List of international goals scored by Gianluca Lapadula
No.	Date	Venue	Opponent	Score	Result	Competition
1	23 June 2021	Estádio Olímpico Pedro Ludovico, Goiânia, Brazil	Ecuador	1–2	2–2	2021 Copa América
2	2 July 2021	Estádio Olímpico Pedro Ludovico, Goiânia, Brazil	Paraguay	2–1	3–3 (4–3 p)	2021 Copa América
3	9 July 2021	Estádio Nacional Mané Garrincha, Brasília, Brazil	Colombia	2–2	2–3	2021 Copa América
4	11 November 2021	Estadio Nacional, Lima, Peru	Bolivia	1–0	3–0	2022 FIFA World Cup qualification
5	16 November 2021	Estadio Olímpico de la UCV, Caracas, Venezuela	Venezuela	1–0	2–1	2022 FIFA World Cup qualification
6	29 March 2022	Estadio Nacional, Lima, Peru	Paraguay	1–0	2–0	2022 FIFA World Cup qualification
7	5 June 2022	RCDE Stadium, Barcelona, Spain	New Zealand	1–0	1–0	Friendly
8	27 September 2022	Audi Field, Washington, D.C., United States	El Salvador	2–1	4–1	Friendly
9	22 March 2024	Estadio Alejandro Villanueva, Lima, Peru	Nicaragua	2–0	2–0	Friendly
10	26 September 2026	Inter.co Stadium, Orlando, United States	United States	1–1	1–4	Friendly
11	13 November 2026	Estadio Alejandro Villanueva, Lima, Peru,	Bolivia	1–0	2–0	Friendly

== Honours ==
Gorica

- Slovenian Football Cup: 2013–14

Milan

- Supercoppa Italiana: 2016

Cagliari

- Serie B play-offs: 2023

Individual

- Lega Pro top scorer: 2014–15 (Group A, 24 goals)
- Serie B top scorer: 2015–16 (27 goals), 2022–23 (21 goals)
- Gran Galà Top 11 Serie B: 2015–16
- IFFHS Team of the Copa América: 2021
