= Floriano Vanzo =

Italian-Belgian footballer

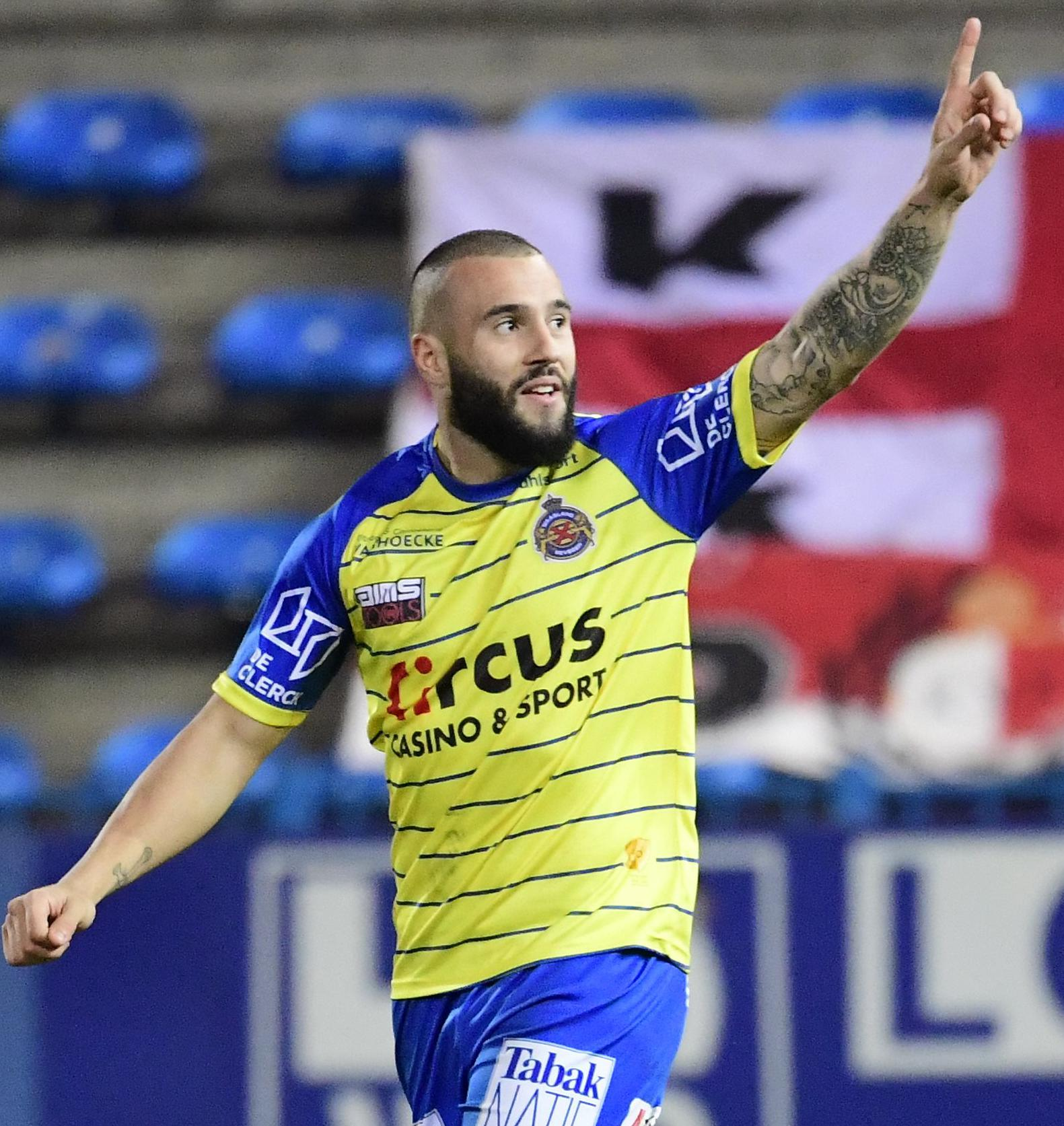
- Image of Floriano Vanzo

Personal information
- Date of birth: 28 April 1994 (age 32)
- Place of birth: La Louvière, Belgium
- Height: 1.80 m (5 ft 11 in)
- Position: Attacking midfielder

Youth career
- –2011: Tubize
- 2012–2013: Parma

Senior career*
| Years | Team | Apps | (Gls) |
| 2011–2012 | Tubize | 13 | (0) |
| 2012–2014 | Parma | 0 | (0) |
| 2013 | → Gorica (loan) | 4 | (0) |
| 2014 | Club Brugge | 0 | (0) |
| 2014 | Club NXT | | |
| 2015–2019 | Waasland-Beveren | 81 | (8) |
| 2019–2020 | Virton | 9 | (0) |
| 2020–2021 | Politehnica Iași | 33 | (0) |
| 2021 | Academica Clinceni | 9 | (0) |
| 2022 | Politehnica Iași | | |
| 2022–2024 | RAAL La Louvière | 47 | (1) |
| 2023–2024 | → Rochefort (loan) | 14 | (0) |

International career
| 2016 | Belgium U21 | 1 | (0) |
- * Club domestic league appearances and goals as of 7 February 2026

Floriano Vanzo (born 28 April 1994) is a Belgian professional footballer who plays as a midfielder.

== Club career ==
Vanzo signed a two-year contract with A.F.C. Tubize in 2011. He made his debut in 2011–12 Belgian Second Division.

In the summer of 2012 Vanzo was signed by Italian club Parma F.C. after an agreement between Tubize and Parma was formed in November 2012. His transfer was documented to Lega Serie A on 4 July 2012, but was completed six months later, on 18 January 2013.

Vanzo signed a two-year contract with the Italian side and made his debut for the reserve team on the next day. He was selected for the 32 man squad for the pre-season training of Parma's first team.

On 1 July 2013, Vanzo left the reserve team to join Slovenian club Gorica, along with Bright Addae, Daniele Bazzoffia, Uroš Celcer, Massimo Coda, Alex Cordaz, Sebestyén Ihrig-Farkas, Alen Jogan, Gianluca Lapadula and Fabio Lebran. The deals were finalized on 12 July. His loan contract with Gorica was terminated in late January.

On 8 January 2014, Vanzo returned to Belgium with Club Brugge. He was a test player for the reserve team. After a successful trial, the club later offered Vanzo a three-year deal.

On 22 January 2015, Vanzo was signed by Waasland-Beveren.

Vanzo joined hometown club RAAL La Louvière on 15 April 2022 after a stint in Romania where he played for Politehnica Iași and Academica Clinceni.

== Personal life ==
Vanzo was born in La Louvière, Belgium to Italian parents.
