= Massimo Coda =

Italian footballer (born 1988)

Personal information
- Date of birth: 10 November 1988 (age 38)
- Place of birth: Cava de' Tirreni, Italy
- Height: 1.84 m (6 ft 0 in)
- Position: Striker

Team information
- Current team: Catania

Youth career
- –2005: Cavese
- 2007: Treviso

Senior career*
Years	Team	Apps	(Gls)
2005	Cavese	2	(0)
2005–2007	Bellinzona	21	(0)
2006–2007	→ Cisco Roma (loan)	8	(0)
2007–2008	Treviso	0	(0)
2008	→ Crotone (loan)	2	(0)
2008–2010	Bologna	0	(0)
2008–2010	→ Cremonese (loan)	49	(16)
2010–2011	Cremonese	31	(8)
2011–2012	Bologna	0	(0)
2012	→ Siracusa (loan)	14	(2)
2012–2013	San Marino	32	(10)
2013–2015	Parma	18	(2)
2013–2014	→ Gorica (loan)	33	(18)
2015–2017	Salernitana	80	(31)
2017–2020	Benevento	87	(32)
2020–2022	Lecce	72	(42)
2022–2024	Genoa	31	(10)
2023–2024	→ Cremonese (loan)	35	(16)
2024–2026	Sampdoria	61	(17)
2026–	Catania	0	(0)
- * Club domestic league appearances and goals as of 13 May 2026

Massimo Coda (born 10 November 1988) is an Italian professional footballer who last played as a striker for Serie C Group C club Catania. He is the all-time top goalscorer in Serie B.

== Career ==
Coda started his career at Cavese. Aged 16, he signed for Swiss club Bellinzona. He then moved on loan to Cisco Roma, before Treviso made a permanent move for the player in July 2007, for €350,000.

=== Bologna ===
On 26 June 2008, Bologna signed Coda in a joint-ownership deal on a five-year contract (for €1.05 million, with Dino Fava returning to Treviso for €900,000 (i.e. €150,000 cash), (Note: Fava himself was signed by Bologna in cash-plus player deal: €200,000 plus Luca Tedeschi, tagged for €700,000)). He was immediately sent on loan to Cremonese. In June 2009, Bologna signed Coda outright, for €100,000, with Tedeschi also signed by Treviso outright, for €1,000. He remained in Cremona for two more seasons, with the club having purchased him in a co-ownership deal for €150,000 (the same amount of cash that Bologna paid in 2008), in June 2010. In June 2011, Coda returned to Bologna again for just €25,000, on a two-year contract. On 3 January 2012, he was loaned to Siracusa. On 31 August 2012, Coda left for San Marino Calcio on a free transfer.

=== Parma ===
In June 2013, he joined Parma for an undisclosed fee. On 1 July 2013, Coda was loaned to Slovenian club Gorica along with Bright Addae, Daniele Bazzoffia, Uroš Celcer, Alex Cordaz, Sebestyén Ihrig-Farkas, Alen Jogan, Gianluca Lapadula, Floriano Vanzo and Fabio Lebran (Crotone/Parma). The deals were finalized on 12 July. In the Slovenian PrvaLiga, he made 33 appearances and scored 18 goals, finishing the 2013–14 Slovenian PrvaLiga season second among the league's top goalscorers. After one season of playing in Slovenia, Coda returned to Parma and made his Serie A debut for the club during the 2014–15 season. On 21 September 2014, in a match against Chievo, he came on to the pitch as a substitute in the 63rd minute and finished the match with a goal and two assists, helping his side to a 3–2 away win. Coda was released by Parma in the summer of 2015, following the club's bankruptcy.

=== Salernitana ===
On 29 August 2015, he signed for Salernitana on a three-year contract.

=== Benevento ===
On 1 July 2017, Coda joined Serie A newcomers Benevento. He spent three seasons in Benevento, scoring 34 goals in 95 games.

=== Lecce ===
On 26 August 2020, Coda joined Lecce. He ended the 2020–21 Serie B season as the league's top scorer with 22 goals, becoming the first Lecce player to be crowned top scorer in Serie B and helping the club to reach the play-offs. In the following season he was the league's top scorer for a second time with 20 goals, helping Lecce to achieve promotion to Serie A.

=== Genoa ===
On 30 June 2022, Coda signed for Genoa.

On 27 August 2023, he returned on loan to Cremonese, with an option to buy.

=== Sampdoria ===
Coda signed for Sampdoria in the summer of 2024. In June 2025, he scored in the relegation playout against Salernitana, a match that was abandoned and subsequently forfeited after Salernitana fans rioted, with Sampdoria being awarded a 3–0 victory, thus avoiding relegation from Serie B. In February 2026 he became the all-time goalscorer in Serie B, surpassing the record of 135 previously held by Stefan Schwoch, after scoring against Südtirol. He left Sampdoria in July 2026.

== Career statistics ==
As of match played 6 April 2025

Appearances and goals by club, season and competition
Club	Season	League			National cup (Note: Includes Coppa Italia, Slovenian Cup)		Other		Total	
Club	Season	Division	Apps	Goals	Apps	Goals	Apps	Goals	Apps	Goals
Cavese	2004–05	Serie C2	2	0	0	0	—		2	0
Bellinzona	2005–06	Swiss Challenge League	21	0	2	0	—		23	0
Cisco Roma (loan)	2006–07	Serie C2	8	0	0	0	—		8	0
Treviso	2007–08	Serie B	0	0	0	0	—		0	0
Crotone (loan)	2007–08	Serie C1	2	0	—		2 (Note: Appearances in Serie C1 promotion play-offs)	0	4	0
Bologna	2008–09	Serie A	—		2	0	—		2	0
Cremonese (loan)	2008–09	Lega Pro Prima Divisione	20	6	0	0	—		20	6
Cremonese (loan)	2009–10	Lega Pro Prima Divisione	29	10	3	0	1 (Note: Appearances in Lega Pro Prima Divisione promotion play-offs)	0	33	10
Cremonese	2010–11	Lega Pro Prima Divisione	31	8	2	0	—		33	8
Cremonese	Total		80	24	5	0	1	0	86	24
Siracusa (loan)	2011–12	Lega Pro Prima Divisione	14	2	0	0	1	0	15	2
San Marino	2012–13	Lega Pro Prima Divisione	32	10	0	0	—		32	10
Gorica (loan)	2013–14	Slovenian PrvaLiga	33	18	3	0	—		36	18
Parma	2014–15	Serie A	18	2	0	0	—		18	2
Salernitana	2015–16	Serie B	40	15	1	0	2 (Note: Appearances in Serie B relegation play-outs)	2	43	17
Salernitana	2016–17	Serie B	40	16	2	0	—		42	16
Salernitana	Total		80	31	3	0	2	2	85	33
Benevento	2017–18	Serie A	24	4	1	0	—		25	4
Benevento	2018–19	Serie B	34	21	4	1	2 (Note: Appearances in Serie B promotion play-offs)	1	40	23
Benevento	2019–20	Serie B	29	7	1	0	—		30	7
Benevento	Total		87	32	6	1	2	1	95	34
Lecce	2020–21	Serie B	36	22	2	0	2	0	40	22
Lecce	2021–22	Serie B	36	20	2	2	—		38	22
Lecce	Total		72	42	4	2	2	0	78	44
Genoa	2022–23	Serie B	31	10	2	1	—		33	11
Genoa	2023–24	Serie A	0	0	1	0	—		1	0
Genoa	Total		31	10	3	1	—		34	11
Cremonese (loan)	2023–24	Serie B	35	16	2	1	4	1	41	18
Sampdoria	2024–25	Serie B	33	8	2	0	1	0	37	8
Sampdoria	2025–26	Serie B	28	9	1	0	0	0	29	9
Sampdoria	Total		61	17	3	0	1	0	65	17
Career total			576	204	33	5	15	4	624	213

== Honours ==
Gorica

- Slovenian Cup: 2013–14

Benevento

- Serie B: 2019–20

Lecce

- Serie B: 2021–22

Individual

- Slovenian PrvaLiga Best Player: 2013–14
- Serie B top scorer: 2020–21 (22 goals), 2021–22 (20 goals)
- Serie B Team of the Season: 2020–21
