= Alex Cordaz =

Italian footballer (born 1983)

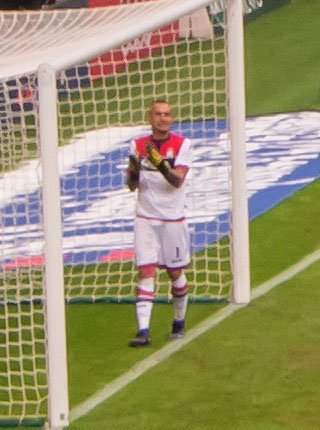
- Cordaz with Crotone in 2016

Personal information
- Full name: Alex Cordaz
- Date of birth: 1 January 1983 (age 43)
- Place of birth: Vittorio Veneto, Italy
- Height: 1.88 m (6 ft 2 in)
- Position: Goalkeeper

Team information
- Current team: Vigne

Youth career
- Inter Milan

Senior career*
Years	Team	Apps	(Gls)
2002–2006	Inter Milan	0	(0)
2002–2003	→ Spezia (loan)	1	(0)
2005	→ Spezia (loan)	5	(0)
2005–2006	→ Acireale (loan)	30	(0)
2006–2009	Treviso	19	(0)
2006	→ Pizzighettone (loan)	18	(0)
2009–2011	Lugano	56	(0)
2011–2013	Cittadella	80	(0)
2013–2015	Parma	0	(0)
2013–2014	→ ND Gorica (loan)	35	(0)
2015	→ Crotone (loan)	19	(0)
2015–2021	Crotone	220	(0)
2021–2023	Inter Milan	1	(0)
2024–2025	Vigne	0	(0)
Total		484	(0)
- * Club domestic league appearances and goals as of 23:10, 3 June 2023 (UTC)

Alex Cordaz (born 1 January 1983) is an Italian professional footballer who plays as a goalkeeper for Vigne.

== Career ==
=== Inter Milan ===
Cordaz started his career at Inter Milan. In the 2001–02 season, he was the regular selection ahead of Mathieu Moreau for first choice at Primavera Team (U20 team), where he won the championship.

When he turned 19, he was loaned out to Spezia of Serie C1. He played as the backup of Hugo Daniel Rubini.

In summer 2003, he returned to Inter as first team 3rd goalkeeper, while his ex-competitor Moreau was farmed out to Spezia. Cordaz made his first team debut against Juventus on 4 February 2004 in a Coppa Italia match which ended in a 2–2 draw.

He left for Spezia of Serie C1 again in January 2005. He won Coppa Italia Serie C along with Inter youth products Riccardo Meggiorini and Hernán Paolo Dellafiore, all of whom left on loan in January 2005.

He spent the 2005–06 season at Acireale of Serie C1 along with Devis Nossa and Fabrizio Biava. He was the first choice of the team, but missed the relegation playoff and Simone Deliperi played instead. Acireale were relegated after losing in the playoffs.

=== Treviso ===
On 31 August 2006, the last day of the transfer window, Cordaz was sold to newly relegated Treviso in a joint-ownership bid, for a peppercorn fee of €500. But he spent the first half of the season on loan at Pizzighettone of Serie C1. During the 2008–09 season Cordaz (€800,000 ca. January 2009) joined Treviso outright. January 2009 also saw the return of Gianluca Litteri (€50,000) and the signing of Samuele Longo and Mame Baba Thiam outright, which meant the deal involved little cash. Cordaz himself meant Inter had a financial income of €799,500 as the value of their retained half was increased from €500 to €800,000 in accounting.

=== Lugano ===
After Treviso disbanded due to financial issues, Cordaz found himself without a team, and later agreed for a move to Switzerland by joining Swiss Challenge League outfit FC Lugano on a free transfer.

=== Cittadella ===
On 5 July 2011, he returned to Serie B for Cittadella, replacing former Inter team-mate Simone Villanova.

=== Parma ===
In June 2013, Cordaz was signed by Parma on a free transfer. On 1 July 2013, he was farmed to Slovenian club ND Gorica along with Bright Addae, Daniele Bazzoffia, Uroš Celcer, Massimo Coda, Sebestyén Ihrig-Farkas, Alen Jogan, Gianluca Lapadula, Floriano Vanzo and Fabio Lebran (Crotone/Parma). The deals were finalized on 12 July.

In the first half of the 2014–15 season he failed to seek a new club, thus he became a backup keeper for Parma, despite wearing the no.1 shirt. On 9 January 2015, Cordaz left for Crotone, with Pavol Bajza returning to Parma. Cordaz also wore the number 84 shirt vacated by Bajza.

=== Crotone ===
On 8 July 2015, Cordaz signed a three-year contract with Crotone. During this spell he managed to keep 48 clean sheets and almost scoring from his own box. During the 2020–21 Serie A season, Crotone finished in second-last place in the league and suffered relegation, with Cordaz setting a record for most goals conceded in a single Serie A season (91 out of the team's 92 goals), since statistical data began to be collected from the 1994–95 Serie A season onwards).

=== Return to Inter Milan ===
On 25 June 2021, it was announced that Cordaz had signed a one-year contract with Inter Milan. On 23 June 2022, Cordaz signed a 1-year extension with Inter.

== Career statistics ==
Appearances and goals by club, season and competition
Club	Season	League	League		National Cup		Europe		Other		Total	
Club	Season	League	Apps	Goals	Apps	Goals	Apps	Goals	Apps	Goals	Apps	Goals
Inter Milan	2003–04	Serie A	0	0	1	0	0	0	—		1	0
Spezia (loan)	2002–03	Serie C1	1	0	1	0	—		—		2	0
Spezia (loan)	2004–05	Serie C1	5	0	—		—		—		5	0
Acireale (loan)	2005–06	Serie C1	30	0	0	0	—		0	0	30	0
Treviso	2006–07	Serie B	2	0	—		—		—		2	0
Treviso	2007–08	Serie B	2	0	0	0	—		—		2	0
Treviso	2008–09	Serie B	15	0	1	0	—		—		16	0
Treviso	Total		19	0	1	0	—		—		20	0
Pizzighettone (loan)	2006–07	Serie C1	18	0	—		—		—		18	0
Lugano	2009–10	Swiss Challenge League	27	0	0	0	—		2 (Note: Appearances in Swiss Challenge League Promotion Play-offs)	0	29	0
Lugano	2010–11	Swiss Challenge League	29	0	1	0	—		—		30	0
Lugano	Total		56	0	1	0	—		2	0	59	0
Cittadella	2011–12	Serie B	40	0	2	0	—		—		42	0
Cittadella	2012–13	Serie B	40	0	2	0	—		—		42	0
Cittadella	Total		80	0	4	0	—		—		84	0
Parma	2014–15	Serie A	0	0	—		—		—		0	0
Gorica (loan)	2013–14	Slovenian PrvaLiga	35	0	3	0	—		—		38	0
Crotone (loan)	2014–15	Serie B	19	0	—		—		—		19	0
Crotone	2015–16	Serie B	42	0	3	0	—		—		45	0
Crotone	2016–17	Serie A	36	0	1	0	—		—		37	0
Crotone	2017–18	Serie A	38	0	1	0	—		—		34	0
Crotone	2018–19	Serie B	32	0	2	0	—		—		34	0
Crotone	2019–20	Serie B	36	0	2	0	—		—		38	0
Crotone	2020–21	Serie A	36	0	0	0	—		—		36	0
Crotone	Total		220	0	9	0	—		—		229	0
Inter Milan	2021–22	Serie A	0	0	0	0	0	0	0	0	0	0
Inter Milan	2022–23	Serie A	1	0	0	0	0	0	0	0	1	0
Inter Milan	Total		1	0	0	0	0	0	0	0	1	0
Career total			484	0	20	0	0	0	2	0	506	0

== Honours ==
Inter Milan Primavera

- Campionato Nazionale Primavera: 2002

Spezia

- Coppa Italia Serie C: 2005

Inter Milan

- Coppa Italia: 2021–22, 2022–23
- Supercoppa Italiana: 2021, 2022
- UEFA Champions League runner-up: 2022–23
