= Fabio Lebran =

Italian footballer

Personal information
- Date of birth: 12 January 1987 (age 39)
- Place of birth: Camposampiero, Italy
- Height: 1.90 m (6 ft 3 in)
- Position: Centre back

Team information
- Current team: Treviso Academy

Youth career
- ?–2003: Montebelluna
- 2002–2003: → Parma (loan)
- 2003–2005: Parma

Senior career*
Years	Team	Apps	(Gls)
2005–2013	Parma	0	(0)
2005–2007	→ Carrarese (loan)	17	(0)
2007–2008	→ Carpenedolo (loan)	33	(0)
2008–2009	→ Venezia (loan)	28	(1)
2009–2010	→ Rimini (loan)	27	(1)
2010–2012	→ AlbinoLeffe (loan)	31	(1)
2012–2013	→ Perugia (loan)	12	(1)
2013–2015	Crotone	0	(0)
2013–2014	→ Gorica (loan)	1	(0)
2014	→ SPAL (loan)	13	(1)
2014–2015	→ Como (loan)	23	(0)
2015–2016	Savona	25	(0)
2016–2017	Campodarsego	24	(0)
2017–2019	Darfo Boario		
2019–	Treviso Academy	´	
- * Club domestic league appearances and goals

Fabio Lebran (born 12 January 1987) is an Italian professional footballer who plays as a centre back for Treviso Academy.

== Career ==
Born in Camposampiero, Veneto, Lebran started his career at Montebelluna. He then left for Emilia side Parma along with Filippo Mattiuzzo and Simone Pajaro. In summer 2005 he left for Serie C2 side Carrarese in co-ownership deal, where he played two seasons. He also earned a few call-up to Italy under-20 Lega Pro representative team for 2006–07 Mirop Cup (against Croatia U20 team), for training matches and a training match for 2006 Trofeo Dossena.

In June 2007, Parma bought back Lebran and he was loaned to Serie C2 side Carpenedolo. In summer 2008, he left for Lega Pro 1st Divisione (ex-Serie C1) side Venezia in another co-ownership deal. At Venice, Lebran was the regular starter and earned a call-up to Italy U21 Lega Pro team against England C team, which ended in 2–2 draw. He was bought back by Parma again in June 2009 and sold to 1st Divisione side Rimini in co-ownership deal few weeks later, for €75,000.

Few weeks before the bankrupt of Rimini, Parma bought him back on 25 June 2010, for €75,000. He was awarded no.23 shirt, call-up to the pre-season camp and played a club friendly for Gialloblu.

On 6 August 2010, he joined Serie B side AlbinoLeffe in co-ownership deal, for €150,000. The club relegated in 2012. In June 2012 Lebran returned to Parma for €200,000 in 2-year contract. On 12 July he was signed by Perugia of the third division.

=== Crotone ===
In June 2013 Lebran left for Crotone in new co-ownership deal, in three-year contract, with Massimo Loviso moved to opposite direction in co-ownership deal. Both 50% "card" of the players were valued €400,000. On 1 July 2013 Lebran left for Slovenian club ND Gorica. The paperwork was finalized on 19 July. Parma also loaned several players to Gorica on 1 July, namely: Bright Addae, Daniele Bazzoffia, Uroš Celcer, Massimo Coda, Alex Cordaz, Sebestyén Ihrig-Farkas, Alen Jogan, Gianluca Lapadula and Floriano Vanzo.

On 10 January 2014, Lebran was signed by SPAL.

On 18 June 2014, Loviso moved to Parma outright as well as Lebran to Crotone outright.

On 11 July 2014, Lebran was signed by Como.

=== Later career ===
After two years with Darfo Boario, Lebran left the club in the summer 2019. He remained without club until December 2019, where he joined Promozione club Treviso Academy.
