= Vučkić =

Vučkić is a surname. Notable people with the surname include:

- Alen Vučkić (born 1990), Slovenian footballer
- Haris Vučkić (born 1992), Slovenian footballer, brother of Alen
