= Štrukelj =

Štrukelj is a Slovene surname. Notable people with the surname include:

- Branimir Štrukelj (born 1957), Slovenian trade unionist and politician
- Januš Štrukelj (born 1991), Slovenian footballer
- Marjan Štrukelj (born 1964), Slovenian slalom canoeist
- Mark Tullio Strukelj (born 1962), Italian footballer
- Miha Štrukelj (born 1973), Slovenian artist
