= Vlado Badžim =

Slovenian footballer and manager (born 1964)

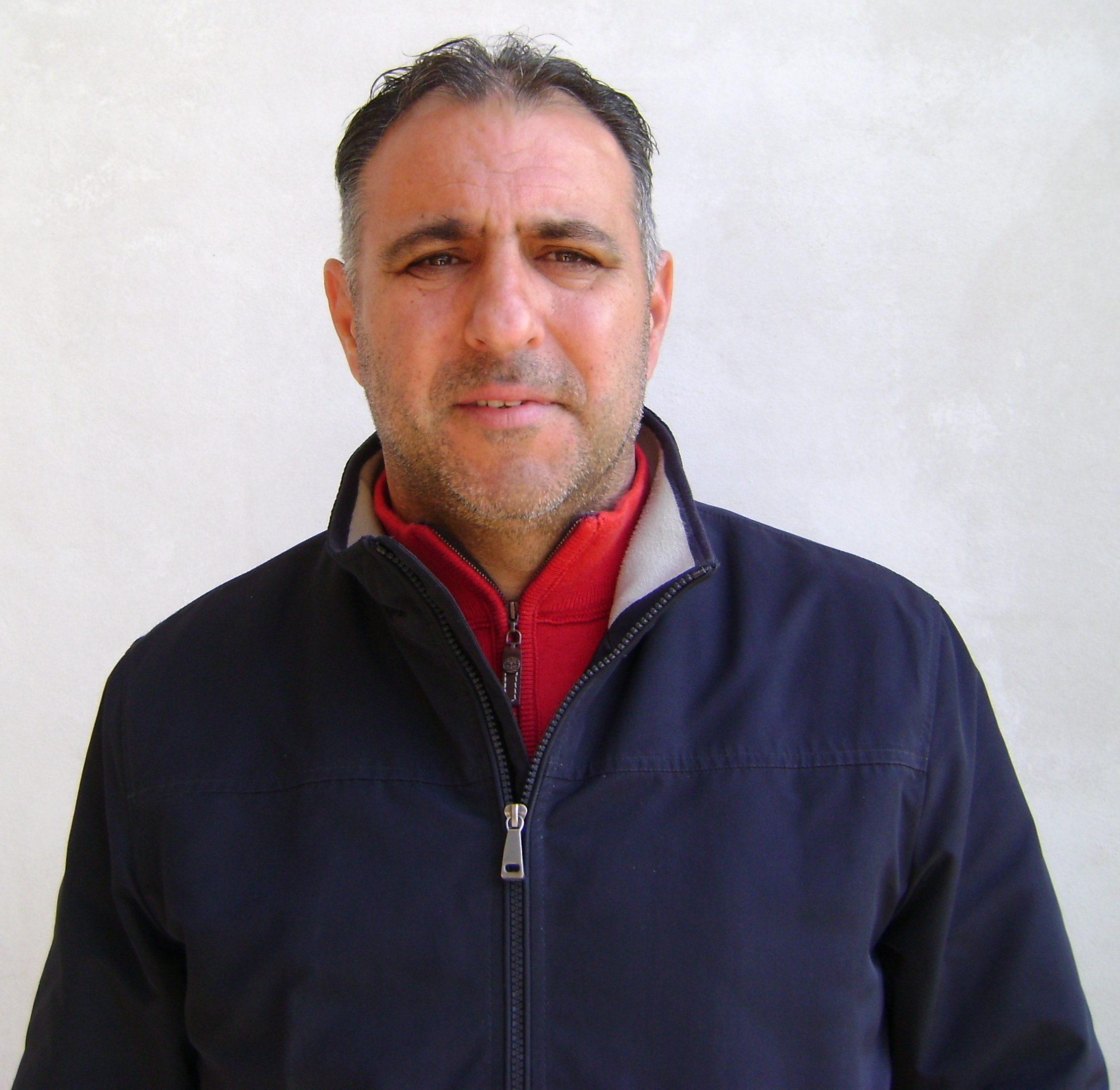

Personal information
- Date of birth: 21 October 1964 (age 62)
- Place of birth: Koper, SFR Yugoslavia

Team information
- Current team: Adria (head coach)

Senior career*
Years	Team	Apps	(Gls)
1982–1992	Koper		
1993–1994	Jadran Dekani	9	(2)

Managerial career
- 2001–2003: Jadran Hrpelje-Kozina
- 2004–2007: Bonifika
- 2007–2008: Koper
- 2008–2009: Domžale
- 2011: Koper
- 2011–2019: Ankaran
- 2019–2020: Brda
- 2021: Izola
- 2022–2025: Izola
- 2025–: Adria
- * Club domestic league appearances and goals

Vlado Badžim (born 21 October 1964) is a Slovenian football manager and former player.

He has managed Slovenian top tier-sides Koper and Domžale.

== Honours ==
=== Manager ===
Koper

- Slovenian Cup: 2006–07
