= Solomon Enow =

Cameroonian footballer

Personal information
- Date of birth: 18 March 1987 (age 39)
- Place of birth: Yaoundé, Cameroon
- Height: 1.82 m (6 ft 0 in)
- Position: Centre-back

Youth career
- Sampdoria

Senior career*
Years	Team	Apps	(Gls)
2005–2009	Sampdoria	0	(0)
2005–2006	→ Voghera (loan)	34	(2)
2007–2008	→ Gallipoli (loan)	3	(0)
2008	→ Castelnuovo (loan)	12	(0)
2008–2009	→ Legnano (loan)	26	(1)
2009–2012	Spezia	51	(0)
2012	→ Lecco (loan)	1	(0)
2012–2013	Parma	0	(0)
2012–2013	→ Unirea Dej (loan)		
2013–2015	Gorica	21	(0)
2015–2016	ASD Genova Calcio		
2016–2017	Civitanovese	9	(1)
2017–2018	Sangiustese	19	(0)
2018–2019	Castelfidardo	33	(0)
2019	Sangiustese VP		
2019–2021	Valdichienti Ponte		
Total		209	(4)
- * Club domestic league appearances and goals

Solomon "Daddy" Enow (born 18 March 1987) is a Cameroonian former professional footballer who plays as a centre back. He also holds Italian nationality.

== Career ==
Born in Yaoundé, capital of Cameroon, Enow moved to Italy at young age. Enow was a player for Voghera in 2004–05 and 2005–06 Serie D. He also played for the reserve team of Sampdoria from 2003 to January 2005 and 2006–07 season. In 2007 Enow left for Serie C1 club Gallipoli. On 26 January 2008 Enow moved to Serie C2 club Castelnuovo. In 2008, he was spotted by Legnano. Enow played 26 times in the first edition of Lega Pro Prima Divisione (ex-Serie C1).

=== Spezia ===
On 18 July 2009, Enow joined Spezia. Sampdoria gifted the fourth tier club half of the registration rights of Enow and Luca Calzolaio for €500 each. Enow signed a four-year contract. Spezia finished as the runner-up of 2009–10 Lega Pro Seconda Divisione. On 25 June 2010, Sampdoria gave up the remaining 50% registration rights of Calzolaio and Enow to Spezia for free. Enow played 1 1/2 seasons for Spezia in the third tier. On 31 January 2012, Enow left for Lecco. Lecco finished as the losing side of the relegation playoffs of 2011–12 Lega Pro Seconda Divisione, thus relegated to Serie D.

=== Parma ===
On 31 August 2012, Enow was signed by Parma F.C. for free. Spezia had signed Lorenzo Crisetig (Parma/Inter), Alessandro Iacobucci (Parma/Siena), Matteo Mandorlini (Brescia/Parma), Stefano Okaka, Mário Rui and Raffaele Schiavi in temporary deals from Parma for free. Enow was immediately left for Romanian club CFR Cluj, but soon left for Unirea Dej. He scored few goals for the Liga III club.

=== Gorica ===
In June 2013 Enow was sold to Slovenian club Gorica for €1 million. Uroš Celcer and Alen Jogan also joined Parma for undisclosed fee from Gorica.

Enow signed a three-year contract with Gorica. The paperwork was finalized on 17 July. He was released in summer 2015.
