= Alessandro Gozzi =

Italian footballer (born 1993)

Personal information
- Date of birth: 12 April 1993 (age 33)
- Place of birth: Pinerolo, Italy
- Height: 1.87 m (6 ft 1 1/2 in)
- Position: Goalkeeper

Youth career
- Pro Vercelli

Senior career*
Years	Team	Apps	(Gls)
2011–2012	Chieri	29	(0)
2012–2013	Savona	3	(0)
2013–2014	Parma	0	(0)
2013–2014	→ Zakynthos (loan)	0	(0)
2014	→ Gubbio (loan)	1	(0)
2014–2015	Savona	0	(0)
2016	Pinerolo	3	(0)
2017–2018	Como	3	(0)
2018–2019	Cuneo	1	(0)
- * Club domestic league appearances and goals as of 25 May 2019

Alessandro Gozzi (born 12 April 1993) is an Italian footballer.

== Biography ==
Born in Pinerolo, in the Province of Turin, Piedmont, Gozzi was a player for Pro Vercelli. He played in 2010–11 reserve league. In summer 2011 he left for Serie D club Chieri. In summer 2012 Gozzi joined the fourth division club Savona. On 28 August 2013 Gozzi was signed by Parma F.C. He immediately left for Greek club Zakynthos along with Mauro Cerquetani.

On 31 January 2014 Gozzi was signed by Gubbio along with Bright Addae.
