= Jan Novak (footballer, born 1997) =

Slovenian footballer

Personal information
- Full name: Jan Novak
- Date of birth: 4 October 1997 (age 29)
- Place of birth: Slovenia
- Height: 1.69 m (5 ft 7 in)
- Positions: Forward; winger

Team information
- Current team: NK Trebnje
- Number: 7

Youth career
- 2004–2014: Krka

Senior career*
Years	Team	Apps	(Gls)
2014–2017	Krka	19	(2)
2017–2018	Brentford	0	(0)
2018–2019	Krka	26	(5)
2019–2020	Drava Ptuj	18	(2)
2020–2021	Krka	3	(0)
2021–	NK Trebnje	97	(36)

International career
2014	Slovenia U18	4	(0)
- * Club domestic league appearances and goals as of 18:49, 1 September 2026 (UTC)

Jan Novak (born 4 October 1997) is a Slovenian professional footballer who as a forward for Ljubljana Regional League club NK Trebnje. He is a product of the NK Krka youth system and represented Slovenia at U18 level.

== Club career ==
=== NK Krka ===
A forward or winger, Novak began his career in his native Slovenia with NK Krka in 2004. He rose through the youth ranks to make his professional debut for the club at 16 years of age, with a late appearance as a substitute for Martin Kramarič in a 3–1 PrvaLiga defeat to NK Rudar Velenje on 23 August 2014. Despite scoring prolifically for the youth teams, it wasn't until after relegation to the Second League that Novak made a breakthrough into the first team, making 18 appearances and two goals during the first half of the 2016–17 season before departing the Portoval on 31 January 2017.

=== Brentford ===
During the 2016–17 pre-season, Novak travelled to England to join the B team at Championship club Brentford on trial. He was successful, but paperwork problems meant that he was unable to join the club until 31 January 2017, when he signed an 18-month contract for an undisclosed fee. Novak made 32 appearances and scored six goals before his release at the end of the 2017–18 season.

=== Return to Slovenia ===
On 22 August 2018, Novak returned to Slovenia to rejoin Second League club NK Krka on a one-year contract and made 27 appearances and scored five goals during the 2018–19 season. Upon the expiration of his contract on 1 July 2019, Novak joined Second League club NK Drava Ptuj on a free transfer. He made 19 appearances and scored two goals during the truncated 2019–20 season and transferred back to NK Krka on 7 August 2020. Novak made just five appearances and transferred to Ljubljana Regional League club NK Trebnje during the 2021–22 off-season. He made 103 appearances and scored 37 goals over the course of the 2021–22, 2022–23, 2023–24, 2024–25 and 2025–26 seasons.

== International career ==
Novak won four U18 caps for Slovenia in 2014.

== Career statistics ==
As of match played 26 August 2026

Appearances and goals by club, season and competition
Club	Season	League			National cup (Note: Includes Slovenian Cup)		Total	
Club	Season	Division	Apps	Goals	Apps	Goals	Apps	Goals
NK Krka	2014–15	Slovenian PrvaLiga	2	0	1	0	3	0
NK Krka	2015–16	Slovenian PrvaLiga	3	0	0	0	3	0
NK Krka	2016–17	Slovenian Second League	14	2	6	1	20	3
NK Krka	Total		19	2	7	1	26	3
NK Krka	2018–19	Slovenian Second League	26	5	1	0	27	5
NK Drava Ptuj	2019–20	Slovenian Second League	18	2	1	0	19	2
NK Krka	2020–21	Slovenian Second League	3	0	2	2	5	2
NK Trebnje	2021–22	Ljubljana Regional League	19	8	—		19	8
NK Trebnje	2022–23	Ljubljana Regional League	18	5	1	0	19	5
NK Trebnje	2023–24	Ljubljana Regional League	16	6	1	1	17	7
NK Trebnje	2024–25	Ljubljana Regional League	23	10	2	0	25	10
NK Trebnje	2025–26	Ljubljana Regional League	21	7	1	0	22	7
NK Trebnje	2026–27	Ljubljana Regional League	0	0	1	0	0	0
NK Trebnje	Total		97	36	6	1	103	37
Career total			162	45	15	3	171	47
