= Grega Sorčan =

Slovenian footballer (born 1996)

Personal information
- Date of birth: 5 March 1996 (age 30)
- Place of birth: Kranj, Slovenia
- Height: 1.88 m (6 ft 2 in)
- Position: Goalkeeper

Team information
- Current team: Unione Fincantieri Monfalcone

Youth career
- –2013: Triglav Kranj
- 2013–2015: Chievo

Senior career*
Years	Team	Apps	(Gls)
2013	Triglav Kranj	1	(0)
2013–2015	Chievo	0	(0)
2015–2019	Gorica	144	(0)
2019–2022	Domžale	26	(0)
2021	→ Gorica (loan)	3	(0)
2022–2023	Apollon Smyrnis	13	(0)
2023–2024	Zagłębie Sosnowiec	0	(0)
2024–2025	Triglav Kranj	42	(0)
2025–	Unione Fincantieri Monfalcone		

International career
2012–2013	Slovenia U17	8	(0)
2014	Slovenia U19	9	(0)
2015–2018	Slovenia U21	19	(0)
2017–2019	Slovenia B	2	(0)
- * Club domestic league appearances and goals as of 24 August 2025

Grega Sorčan (born 5 March 1996) is a Slovenian footballer who plays as a goalkeeper for Italian club Unione Fincantieri Monfalcone.

== Club career ==
Sorčan made his professional debut with Triglav Kranj in a 3–0 loss against Rudar Velenje on 3 August 2013. He briefly transferred to Chievo in the Italian Serie A, before returning to Gorica as a starting goalkeeper.

== International career ==
Sorčan was a youth international for Slovenia.
