= Alen Jogan =

Slovenian footballer

Personal information
- Date of birth: 24 August 1985 (age 41)
- Height: 1.84 m (6 ft 0 in)
- Position: Centre-back

Youth career
- Gorica
- Bilje

Senior career*
Years	Team	Apps	(Gls)
2002	Bilje	1	(0)
2002–2009	Gorica	56	(2)
2004–2006	→ Brda (loan)	40	(4)
2009–2010	Interblock	27	(0)
2010–2011	Buttrio		
2011–2013	Gorica	78	(2)
2013–2015	Parma	0	(0)
2013–2015	→ Gorica (loan)	47	(0)
2015–2019	Gorica	65	(2)
- * Club domestic league appearances and goals

Alen Jogan (born 24 August 1985) is a Slovenian retired footballer who played as a centre back.

== Club career ==
Jogan started his senior career at ND Bilje in the Slovenian Third League, playing one match in the 2002–03 season. After joining ND Gorica, he had played for the team in the 2006–07 UEFA Champions League qualifying rounds, and the 2007–08 UEFA Cup.

In 2009 Jogan signed for Interblock from Ljubljana. In 2010, he crossed the border to Italy for Buttrio of Friuli region. After half season with the club in Eccellenza (Italian sixth division), Jogan re-joined Gorica in January 2011, where he signed a three-and-a-half-year contract.

In June 2013, Jogan and Uroš Celcer joined Italian club Parma for undisclosed fees, with Solomon Enow moved to Slovenia for €1 million. On 1 July 2013, Jogan and Celcer returned to Gorica in temporary deals, along with eight Parma players, namely Bright Addae, Daniele Bazzoffia, Massimo Coda, Alex Cordaz, Sebestyén Ihrig-Farkas, Gianluca Lapadula, Floriano Vanzo and Fabio Lebran (Crotone/Parma). The paperwork was finalized on 19 July.

After the bankruptcy of Parma, Jogan was re-signed by Gorica.
