= Tine Kavčič =

Slovenian footballer (born 1994)

Personal information
- Date of birth: 16 February 1994 (age 32)
- Place of birth: Slovenia
- Height: 1.85 m (6 ft 1 in)
- Position: Defender

Team information
- Current team: Atletico Uri

Youth career
- –2013: Gorica

Senior career*
Years	Team	Apps	(Gls)
2013–2021	Gorica	169	(5)
2014	→ Brda (loan)	8	(0)
2021–2022	Gemonese		
2022	Opatija	25	(0)
2023	Virtus Bolzano	12	(2)
2023	SC Ritzing	8	(1)
2024–	Atletico Uri	0	(0)

International career
2016	Slovenia U21	5	(0)
- * Club domestic league appearances and goals as of 9 February 2024

Tine Kavčič (born 16 February 1994) is a Slovenian footballer who plays for Italian club Atletico Uri as a defender.
