= Marin Perić =

Croatian footballer

Personal information
- Full name: Marin Perić
- Date of birth: 17 October 1990 (age 36)
- Place of birth: Montreal, Quebec, Canada
- Positions: Winger; forward

Youth career
- –2005: Kraljevica
- 2005–2007: Krk

Senior career*
Years	Team	Apps	(Gls)
2007–2009	Krk		
2009–2010	Grobničan		
2010–2011	Pomorac Kostrena		
2011–2012	Payam Shiraz		
2012	Zavrč		
2013	Krk		
2013	Grobničan		
2014–2016	Krka	80	(11)
2016–2017	USV Allerheiligen	24	(5)
2017–2018	Zmaj Makarska		
2018–2019	Krško	16	(3)
2019	Krk		
- * Club domestic league appearances and goals as of 1 September 2019

Marin Perić (born 17 October 1990) is a Croatian footballer.

== Career ==
Perić had a spell with Austrian Regionalliga side Allerheiligen and returned to NK Krk in September 2019. However, he left the club again at the end of the year.
