= Danijel Dežmar =

Slovenian footballer

Personal information
- Full name: Danijel Dežmar
- Date of birth: 31 March 1988 (age 38)
- Place of birth: Novo Mesto, SFR Yugoslavia
- Height: 1.85 m (6 ft 1 in)
- Position: Defender

Team information
- Current team: NK Trbnje
- Number: 17

Youth career
- 1995–2007: Krka

Senior career*
Years	Team	Apps	(Gls)
2006–2008	Krka	28	(2)
2008–2010	Bela Krajina	60	(3)
2011	Primorje	8	(0)
2011–2012	Krško	24	(0)
2012–2018	Krka	136	(7)
2018	Ivančna Gorica	9	(1)
2018–2020	SK Kirchbach	41	(6)
2021-	NK Trebnje		
- * Club domestic league appearances and goals as of 6 July 2019

Danijel Dežmar (born 31 March 1988) is a Slovenian footballer who plays for NK Trbnje.
