= Matija Škarabot =

Slovenian footballer (born 1988)

Personal information
- Date of birth: 4 February 1988 (age 38)
- Place of birth: Nova Gorica, SFR Yugoslavia
- Height: 1.82 m (6 ft 0 in)
- Position: Left-back

Team information
- Current team: Gemonese Calcio

Youth career
- Adria
- –2007: Gorica

Senior career*
Years	Team	Apps	(Gls)
2007–2010	Gorica	47	(0)
2007–2008	→ Adria (loan)	17	(1)
2010–2013	Gent	23	(0)
2013–2014	Rijeka	17	(0)
2014–2015	Olimpija Ljubljana	16	(1)
2015–2018	Gorica	73	(2)
2019–2021	Primorje	38	(1)
2021–2022	Gemonese Calcio		
2022–2023	AS Pro Gorizia		
2023–	Gemonese Calcio		

International career
2008–2010	Slovenia U20	7	(0)
2009–2010	Slovenia U21	10	(0)
- * Club domestic league appearances and goals

Matija Škarabot (Slovene pronunciation: [maˈtija ˈʃkarabɔt]; born 4 February 1988) is a Slovenian footballer who plays for Italian club Gemonese Calcio as a left-back.

== International career ==
Škarabot made his first appearance for the Slovenia under-21 team on 11 February 2009, in a friendly match against Romania.

On 1 October 2010, Škarabot was summoned into a 23-man squad of the Slovenia national football team for the UEFA Euro 2012 qualifying matches against Faroe Islands and Estonia, held on 8 and 12 October 2010, respectively.

== Personal life ==
Škarabot was in a relationship with Strictly Come Dancing star Nadiya Bychkova until 2021, with whom he has a daughter called Mila.
