= Urban Kramar =

Slovenian footballer

Personal information
- Full name: Urban Kramar
- Date of birth: 3 October 1990 (age 36)
- Place of birth: Novo Mesto, SFR Yugoslavia
- Height: 1.82 m (6 ft 0 in)
- Position: Winger

Youth career
- –2009: Krka

Senior career*
Years	Team	Apps	(Gls)
2009–2017	Krka	135	(29)
- * Club domestic league appearances and goals

Urban Kramar (born 3 October 1990) is a Slovenian retired footballer who played as a winger.
