= Denis Mojstrovič =

Slovenian footballer (born 1986)

Personal information
- Date of birth: 17 October 1986 (age 40)
- Place of birth: Novo Mesto, SFR Yugoslavia
- Position: Midfielder

Youth career
- –2004: Krka

Senior career*
Years	Team	Apps	(Gls)
2004–2017	Krka		
2017–2018	Ivančna Gorica	13	(1)

Managerial career
- 2023: Krka
- * Club domestic league appearances and goals

Denis Mojstrovič (born 17 October 1986) is a Slovenian retired footballer who played as a midfielder.
