= Favour Aniekan =

Nigerian footballer

Personal information
- Date of birth: 10 April 1994 (age 32)
- Place of birth: Nigeria
- Position: Midfielder

Youth career
- –2016: AC Milan

Senior career*
Years	Team	Apps	(Gls)
2014	→ Dainava (loan)	13	(1)
2015–2016	→ Krka (loan)	20	(1)
2017	Brda	6	(0)
- RG Ticino
- * Club domestic league appearances and goals

Favour Aniekan (born 10 April 1994) is a Nigerian footballer who plays as a midfielder for RG Ticino.

== Career ==
Before the 2014 season, Aniekan was sent on loan to Dainava in Lithuania from the youth academy of AC Milan, one of Italy's most successful clubs.

In 2015, he was sent on loan to Krka in the Slovenian top flight.

In 2017, he signed for Slovenian second division side Brda, before joining RG Ticino in the Italian fifth division.
