= Nejc Mevlja =

Slovenian footballer (born 1990)

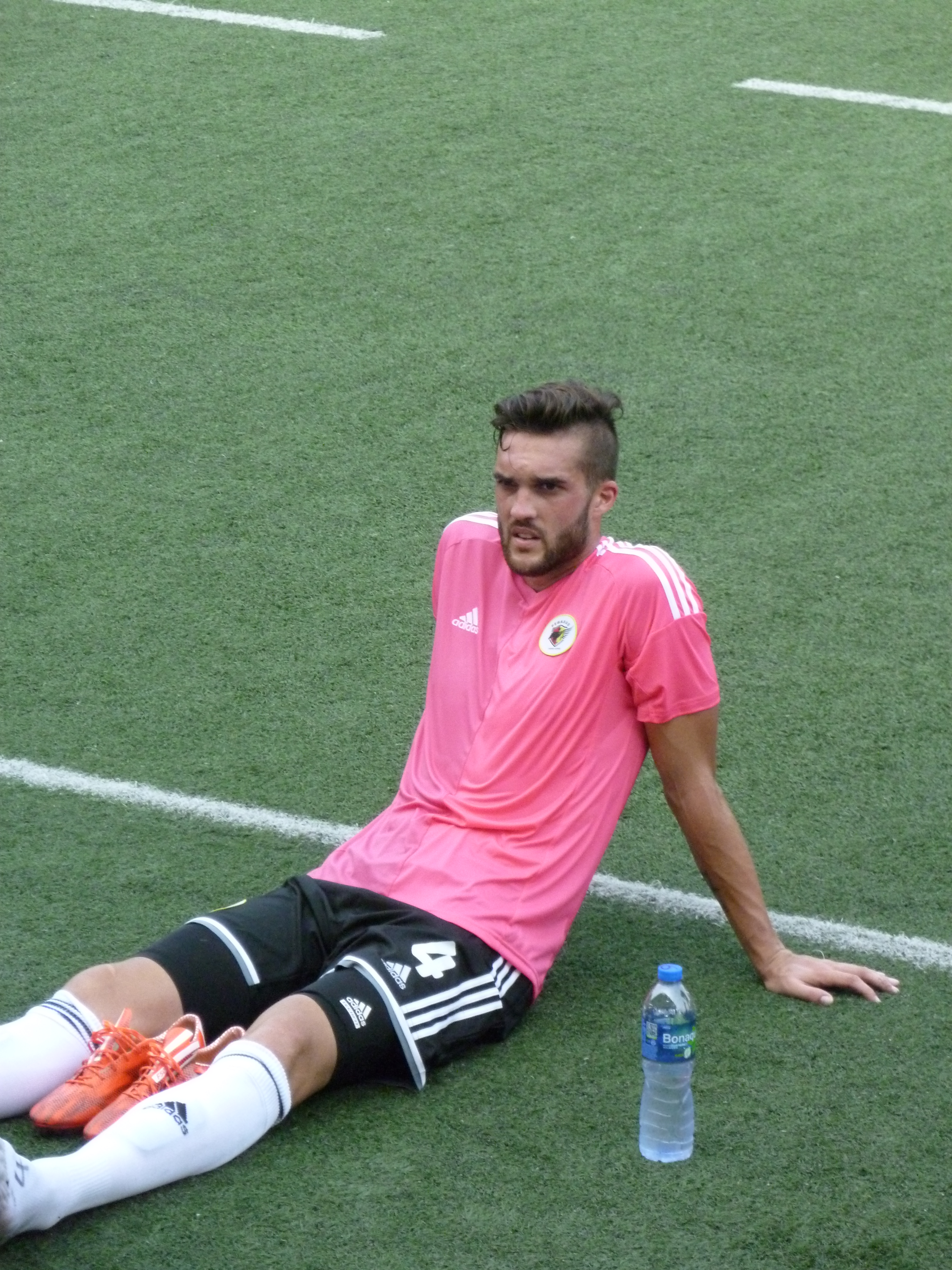
- Mevlja with Pegasus in 2015

Personal information
- Date of birth: 12 June 1990 (age 36)
- Place of birth: Ljubljana, SFR Yugoslavia
- Height: 1.89 m (6 ft 2 in)
- Position: Centre-back

Team information
- Current team: Corno Calcio

Youth career
- Železničar Divača
- Tabor Sežana
- –2009: Gorica

Senior career*
Years	Team	Apps	(Gls)
2008–2012	Gorica	47	(1)
2010	→ Brda (loan)	8	(0)
2012–2013	Maribor	13	(0)
2014	Livingston	13	(1)
2014	Pandurii Târgu Jiu	2	(0)
2015	Zrinjski Mostar	9	(1)
2015	Pegasus	0	(0)
2015–2016	Gorica	13	(0)
2016–2020	FC Schaffhausen	113	(2)
2020–2024	Gorica	99	(9)
2024	Gemonese 1919		
2024–	Corno Calcio		

International career
2009	Slovenia U19	5	(0)
2010–2011	Slovenia U21	9	(0)
- * Club domestic league appearances and goals as of 5 December 2024

Nejc Mevlja (born 12 June 1990) is a Slovenian footballer who plays as a centre-back for Italian club Corno Calcio.

== Career ==
In January 2012, Mevlja had a car accident while driving to the training ground of his club, Gorica. Due to the knee injuries he suffered in the accident, he could not play until the end of 2012. On 24 September 2012, he signed for Maribor as a free agent. He made his debut for Maribor half a year later, in March 2013, when he had fully recovered from his injury.

In January 2014, Mevlja joined Scottish Championship side Livingston until the end of the season. He established himself in the starting, making 13 appearances. He scored his only goal for the club in a 2–1 loss against Dumbarton on 29 March 2014. At the end of the season, Mevlja was released by the club.

== Personal life ==
He has a twin brother named Miha, who also played football professionally as a defender.

== Honours ==
Maribor

- Slovenian First League: 2012–13
- Slovenian Cup: 2012–13

Gorica

- Slovenian Second League: 2021–22
