= Januš Štrukelj =

Slovenian football (born 1991)

Personal information
- Full name: Januš Štrukelj
- Date of birth: 8 April 1991 (age 35)
- Place of birth: SFR Yugoslavia
- Height: 1.86 m (6 ft 1 in)
- Position: Goalkeeper

Youth career
- 2005–2010: Gorica

Senior career*
Years	Team	Apps	(Gls)
2010–2018	Gorica	10	(0)
2011–2012	→ Adria (loan)		
2013–2014	→ Brda (loan)	21	(0)
2015	→ Adria (loan)	9	(0)
2019-2020	Primorje	30	(0)
2021-2022	Adria	26	(0)
- * Club domestic league appearances and goals

Januš Štrukelj (born 8 April 1991) is a Slovenian retired footballer who played as a goalkeeper.
