= Erik Gliha =

Slovenian footballer (born 1997)

Personal information
- Date of birth: 13 February 1997 (age 29)
- Place of birth: Niort, France
- Height: 1.82 m (6 ft 0 in)
- Position: Left-back

Team information
- Current team: SV Rothenthurn
- Number: 31

Youth career
- –2012: Olimpija Ljubljana
- 2013–2014: Šampion
- 2015–2016: Krka

Senior career*
Years	Team	Apps	(Gls)
2013	Kamnik	12	(1)
2013–2014	Šampion	24	(1)
2014–2015	Veržej	18	(0)
2015–2016	Krka	18	(1)
2016–2017	Ankaran Hrvatini	31	(2)
2017–2018	Avellino	0	(0)
2018	Ankaran Hrvatini	16	(1)
2018–2019	Aluminij	16	(0)
2019–2020	Sint-Truiden	0	(0)
2020	Triglav Kranj	13	(0)
2020–2021	Rukh Lviv	10	(0)
2021–2022	Olimpija Ljubljana	1	(0)
2023	Villacher SV	9	(0)
2023–	SV Rothenthurn	12	(0)

International career
2014	Slovenia U18	4	(0)
2014	Slovenia U19	8	(0)
2017–2018	Slovenia U21	16	(1)
- * Club domestic league appearances and goals as of 20 October 2023

Erik Gliha (born 13 February 1997) is a Slovenian football player who plays as a defender for Austrian club SV Rothenthurn.

== Club career ==
Gliha made his Slovenian PrvaLiga debut for Krka on 7 August 2015 in a game against Zavrč.

== Personal life ==
He is the son of former Slovenian national team member Primož Gliha.
