= Žiga Kastrevec =

Slovenian footballer

Personal information
- Full name: Žiga Kastrevec
- Date of birth: 25 February 1994 (age 32)
- Place of birth: Novo Mesto, Slovenia
- Height: 1.82 m (6 ft 0 in)
- Position: Forward

Team information
- Current team: NK Trebnje
- Number: 77

Youth career
- –2013: Krka

Senior career*
Years	Team	Apps	(Gls)
2012–2016	Krka	81	(12)
2013–2014	→ Bela Krajina (loan)	10	(0)
2016	→ Getafe B (loan)	12	(4)
2016–2017	St. Andrews	30	(5)
2018–2022	Krka	99	(18)
2022-	NK Trebnje		

International career
2012	Slovenia U18	1	(0)
2015–2016	Slovenia U21	11	(3)
- * Club domestic league appearances and goals as of 23 July 2023

Žiga Kastrevec (born 25 February 1994) is a Slovenian footballer who plays for NK Trebnje. After his football career in Spain, Kastrevec finally left Krka to sign for St. Andrews FC in Malta.
