= Dino Martinović =

Slovenian footballer (born 1990)

Personal information
- Date of birth: 20 July 1990 (age 36)
- Place of birth: Karlovac, SFR Yugoslavia
- Height: 1.80 m (5 ft 11 in)
- Position: Attacking midfielder

Youth career
- 1996–2005: Krka
- 2005–2007: Dinamo Zagreb

Senior career*
Years	Team	Apps	(Gls)
2007	Krka	1	(0)
2007–2012	Gorica	38	(4)
2007–2008	→ Krka (loan)		
2010	→ Krško (loan)	2	(0)
2010	→ Bela Krajina (loan)	15	(6)
2011	→ Adria (loan)		
2012–2014	Verona	0	(0)
2012–2013	→ AlbinoLeffe (loan)	14	(1)
2013–2014	→ Paganese (loan)	17	(1)
2014	→ Lugano (loan)	5	(0)
2015–2016	Gorica	41	(2)
2017	Lokomotiv Plovdiv	32	(9)
2018	Zhetysu	4	(0)
2018	Vereya	8	(1)
2019–2020	Etar	14	(1)
2021–2022	ASD Forum Julii		
2022–2023	ASD Juventina		

International career
2007	Slovenia U17	1	(0)
- * Club domestic league appearances and goals as of 11 February 2026

Dino Martinović (born 20 July 1990) is a Slovenian professional footballer who plays as an attacking midfielder.

== Career ==
Born in Karlovac, Croatia (at that time part of SFR Yugoslavia), Martinović started his career at Krka's youth selections. Between 2005 and 2007, he was a member of youth teams at Croatian club Dinamo Zagreb.

=== Gorica ===
Martinović was signed by Gorica in August 2007, but was immediately loaned back to Krka. Martinović made his debut for Gorica in the 2009–10 Slovenian PrvaLiga. In January 2010 he was loaned to Krško. In August 2010 he was signed by Bela Krajina on a half-year loan. In July 2011 Martinović left for Adria. However, he returned to Gorica in the same transfer window.

Martinović played four games in the 2012–13 Slovenian PrvaLiga before he left the club in August 2012. He was in the starting eleven on 4 August 2012, in his last game for Gorica.

=== Verona ===
Martinović was signed by Serie B club Verona in August 2012.

On 31 August 2012, he signed for third division side AlbinoLeffe. On 22 August 2013, he signed for Paganese, also in the third division.

On 29 January 2014, Martinović joined the Swiss Challenge League side Lugano on a loan. In summer 2014 he was released by Verona.

=== Lokomotiv Plovdiv ===
On 12 January 2017, Martinović signed a one-and-a-half-year contract with Bulgarian club Lokomotiv Plovdiv.

In summer 2021 he joined Italian side Forum Julii only to leave for Juventina a year later.
