= Sandi Arčon =

Slovenian footballer

Personal information
- Date of birth: 6 January 1991 (age 35)
- Place of birth: Šempeter pri Gorici, SFR Yugoslavia
- Height: 1.84 m (6 ft 0 in)
- Position: Forward

Team information
- Current team: ASD Gemonese 1919

Youth career
- –2006: Bilje
- 2006–2010: Gorica

Senior career*
| Years | Team | Apps | (Gls) |
| 2010–2012 | Gorica | 77 | (10) |
| 2011 | → Adria (loan) | 2 | (6) |
| 2011–2012 | → Brda (loan) | 3 | (2) |
| 2012–2013 | Ashdod | 21 | (1) |
| 2013–2014 | Koper | 7 | (0) |
| 2014–2017 | Gorica | 69 | (8) |
| 2017–2018 | Górnik Zabrze | 12 | (0) |
| 2017–2018 | Górnik Zabrze II | 25 | (6) |
| 2018–2019 | ASD Gemonese 1919 | | (11) |
| 2019 | Campodarsego | 15 | (0) |
| 2020 | Polisportiva Tamai | 10 | (2) |
| 2020–2022 | ASD Gemonese 1919 | | (16) |
| 2022–2023 | Brian Lignano | | |
| 2023– | ASD Gemonese 1919 | | |

International career
| 2007–2008 | Slovenia U17 | 8 | (1) |
| 2010 | Slovenia U21 | 1 | (0) |
| 2017 | Slovenia B | 2 | (0) |
- * Club domestic league appearances and goals as of 6 January 2024

Sandi Arčon (born 6 January 1991) is a Slovenian professional footballer who plays for ASD Gemonese 1919 as a forward.

== Club career ==
Arčon played the majority of his career in Slovenia with Gorica.

After spells in Israel and Poland, he has spent several seasons in the Italian lower leagues.
