= Alen Vučkić =

Slovenian footballer

Personal information
- Full name: Alen Vučkić
- Date of birth: 1 February 1990 (age 36)
- Place of birth: Ljubljana, SFR Yugoslavia
- Height: 1.88 m (6 ft 2 in)
- Positions: Left-back; centre-back

Youth career
- –2009: Domžale

Senior career*
Years	Team	Apps	(Gls)
2008–2010	Domžale	9	(0)
2010–2012	Olimpija Ljubljana	17	(0)
2012–2016	Krka	87	(4)

International career^{‡}
2006–2007	Slovenia U17	3	(0)
2007	Slovenia U18	7	(0)
2007–2009	Slovenia U19	10	(0)
2009–2010	Slovenia U20	2	(0)
2009–2011	Slovenia U21	7	(1)
- * Club domestic league appearances and goals as of 1 July 2016 ‡ National team caps and goals as of 15 September 2012

Alen Vučkić (born 1 February 1990) is a Slovenian football defender.

== Club career ==
Vučkić began his career in Domžale. He can play as left back, central defender or as defensive midfielder.

In March 2010 he has signed a three-year contract with another Slovenian club, Olimpija.

== International career ==
Vučkić was a member of the Slovenia under-21 team, where he played alongside his younger brother Haris Vučkić.

== Personal life ==
He is the older brother of Haris Vučkić. They are of Bosnian descent.
