= Amel Džuzdanović =

Slovenian footballer

Personal information
- Date of birth: 26 August 1994 (age 32)
- Height: 1.70 m (5 ft 7 in)
- Position: Midfielder

Youth career
- –2013: Gorica

Senior career*
Years	Team	Apps	(Gls)
2013–2019	Gorica	74	(8)
2013–2014	→ Brda (loan)	23	(11)
2019	→ Primorje (loan)	12	(5)
2019–2022	Primorje	70	(21)

International career
2012	Slovenia U19	1	(0)
2015	Slovenia U21	1	(0)
- * Club domestic league appearances and goals

Amel Džuzdanović (born 26 August 1994) is a Slovenian retired footballer who played as a midfielder.
