= Bright Addae =

Ghanaian international footballer

Personal information
- Full name: Bright Christopher Addae
- Date of birth: 19 December 1992 (age 33)
- Place of birth: Wa, Ghana
- Height: 1.84 m (6 ft 0 in)
- Position: Midfielder

Team information
- Current team: Nardò
- Number: 90

Senior career*
Years	Team	Apps	(Gls)
2009–2010	Wa All Stars		
2010–2014	Parma	0	(0)
2011	→ Terrassa (loan)		
2012–2013	→ Crotone (loan)	12	(1)
2013–2014	→ Gorica (loan)	3	(0)
2014	→ Gubbio (loan)	11	(2)
2014–2019	Ascoli	155	(8)
2019–2020	Juve Stabia	28	(2)
2020–2021	Hermannstadt	29	(2)
2021	Lavello	6	(0)
2021–2022	Bitonto	18	(2)
2022	Cjarlins Muzane	11	(0)
2022–	Nardò	64	(7)

International career
2009	Ghana U20	3	(0)
2010	Ghana	1	(0)
- * Club domestic league appearances and goals as of 11 February 2026

Bright Christopher Addae (also spelled Addai; born 19 December 1992) is a Ghanaian professional footballer who plays as a midfielder for Italian Serie D club Nardò.

== Club career ==
=== Wa All Stars ===
Born in Wa, Addae began his career with Wa All Stars.

=== Parma and loan deals ===
In November 2009, it was announced that he would be moving to Italian club Parma in the summer of 2010, after signing a four-year contract. In January 2011, he was loaned to Spanish club Terrassa until the end of the 2010–11 season, as Parma ran out of non-EU registration quota for signing players from abroad. In August 2011 his contract was finally registered in Lega Serie A. Addae moved on loan to Crotone in July 2012.

He signed on loan for Slovenian club Gorica on 1 July 2013.

On 31 January 2014, he was signed by Gubbio along with Alessandro Gozzi.

=== Ascoli ===
On 17 July 2014, Addae was signed by Lega Pro club Ascoli in a definitive deal on a 2+1 year contract. Addae and the club confirmed the optional third year on 30 August 2015. On 2 May 2017, he signed a new two-year contract. Throughout his 5 years with the club, he played 155 league matches and scored 8 goals.

=== Juve Stadia ===
Ahead of the 2019–20 season, Addae joined Juve Stabia in Serie B on a two-year contract. He made his debut 25 August 2019, after playing the full 90 minutes in a 2–1 loss against Empoli. In his only season with the club, he played 28 league matches and scored 2 goals.

=== Hermannstadt ===
On 10 September 2020 he moved to Romania and signed with Hermannstadt.

== International career ==
Addae made three appearances at the 2009 FIFA U-20 World Cup (where Ghana won the final), and made his senior international debut for Ghana in 2010.

== Personal life ==
Addae started a foundation called the Bright Addae Foundation to support the needy, orphans, widows and widowers in Assin Fosu, a town in the Central Region of Ghana. The foundation has also supported The Ghana Skatesoccer Association.

== Honours ==
Ascoli Picchio F.C. 1898

- Lega Pro: 2014–15

ND Gorica

- Slovenian Football Cup: 2013–14

Ghana U20

- FIFA U-20 World Cup: 2009
