= Uroš Celcer =

Slovenian footballer

Personal information
- Full name: Uroš Celcer
- Date of birth: 7 April 1989 (age 37)
- Place of birth: SFR Yugoslavia
- Height: 1.82 m (6 ft 0 in)
- Position: Left-back

Youth career
- –2008: Maribor

Senior career*
| Years | Team | Apps | (Gls) |
| 2007–2008 | Maribor | 9 | (0) |
| 2008 | → Malečnik (loan) | 10 | (0) |
| 2009–2011 | Bela Krajina | 61 | (4) |
| 2011–2013 | Gorica | 43 | (1) |
| 2013–2014 | Parma | 0 | (0) |
| 2013–2014 | → Gorica (loan) | 3 | (0) |
| 2014 | Ross County | 5 | (0) |
| 2015–2019 | Gorica | 103 | (3) |
| 2019 | Brda | 17 | (5) |

International career
| 2006–2007 | Slovenia U18 | 5 | (1) |
| 2006–2007 | Slovenia U19 | 7 | (0) |
- * Club domestic league appearances and goals as of 31 August 2019

Uroš Celcer (born 7 April 1989) is a Slovenian professional footballer who most recently played for NK Brda as a defender.

== Club career ==
Celcer and Alen Jogan were signed by Parma in June 2013, with Solomon Enow moved to Gorica for €1 million. On 1 July 2013, Celcer and Jogan returned to Gorica in temporary deals. In summer 2014 Celcer left for Scottish club Ross County. He was released in November 2014.

In summer 2015, Celcer and Jogan were re-signed by Gorica on two-year contracts.
