= 2014–15 NK Maribor season =

NK Maribor
2014–15 season
- President: Drago Cotar
- Head Coach: Ante Šimundža
- Stadium: Ljudski vrt
- Slovenian League: Winners
- Slovenian Cup: Semi-final
- Slovenian Supercup: Winners
- Champions League: Group stage
- Top goalscorer: League: Marcos Tavares (17); All: Marcos Tavares (19)
- Highest home attendance: 12,646 vs Chelsea (5 November 2014)
- Lowest home attendance: 1,200 vs Krka (3 December 2014) and vs Radomlje (6 December 2014)
- Average home league attendance: 4,406
Home colours	Away colours

The 2014–15 season was Maribor's 55th season of football and the club's 24th consecutive season in the Slovenian PrvaLiga since the league establishment in 1991.

After the 2013–14 season when Maribor won the PrvaLiga and Supercup titles, the club continued with their dominance in domestic competitions during the 2014–15 season and has managed to add another two titles among club honours; they have won their 13th league and their fourth supercup title. Unlike the previous season, when Maribor were runners-up in the Slovenian Football Cup, this season Maribor was knocked out from the competition one round earlier when Celje defeated them 3–2 on aggregate during the semi-final of the 2014–15 Slovenian Football Cup. The club did particularly well in the UEFA competitions where they went undefeated during six matches of the 2014–15 UEFA Champions League qualifying campaign and, for the first time in 15 years, have managed to secure a spot among the elite 32 clubs in the competition proper. There the club was drawn into a group with Chelsea, Schalke, and Sporting, and has managed to draw each of them once, winning a total of three points in the process. For manager Ante Šimundža this was the second time he had a taste of the elite competition with Maribor, as he was the club's player during their 1999–2000 campaign.

Team captain Marcos Tavares was the club's top scorer during the season with 19 goals, 17 of which were scored in the Slovenian PrvaLiga where he was crowned the league's top scorer for the third time. The Brazilian made history in late August 2014 when he scored the winning goal during the second leg of the UEFA Champions League play-off round against Celtic. He has also entered a small group of six players who have scored more than 100 goals in the PrvaLiga. By the end of the 2014–15 season Tavares has netted 102 goals in 240 PrvaLiga appearances. During the course of the season Maribor maintained an average league attendance of 4,406 on its home matches. This was the first time in almost two decades that the club's home average league attendance exceeded 4,000 spectators per match.

== Supercup ==
13 August 2014 Final	Gorica	1–4	Maribor	Nova Gorica
20:15 CET	Modolo (yellow card) 2'; Simčič (yellow card) 18'; Širok (yellow card) 35'; Makinwa 65'; Modolo (yellow card) 77' (red card)	Report	Vuklišević 3'; Vršič 19' (pen.); Vuklišević (yellow card) 55'; Vršič 77' (pen.); Fajić 88'	Stadium: Sports Park; Attendance: 600; Referee: Mitja Žganec

Colour key: Green = Maribor win; Yellow = draw; Red = opponents win.

== Slovenian League ==
=== Standings ===
Pos	Team	Pld	W	D	L	GF	GA	GD	Pts	Qualification or relegation
1	Maribor (C)	36	24	7	5	74	32	+42	79	Qualification to Champions League second qualifying round
2	Celje	36	20	10	6	58	31	+27	70	Qualification to Europa League first qualifying round
3	Domžale	36	21	5	10	52	22	+30	68	Qualification to Europa League first qualifying round
4	Olimpija	36	17	10	9	55	32	+23	61	
5	Zavrč	36	15	4	17	38	52	−14	49	

Source: Slovenian PrvaLiga (in Slovene)
Rules for classification: 1) points; 2) points in head-to-head matches; 3) goal difference in head-to-head matches; 4) goals scored in head-to-head matches; 5) total goal difference; 6) total goals scored
(C) Champions

==== Results summary ====
Overall								Home						Away					
Pld	W	D	L	GF	GA	GD	Pts	W	D	L	GF	GA	GD	W	D	L	GF	GA	GD
36	24	7	5	74	32	+42	79	13	3	2	44	18	+26	11	4	3	30	14	+16

Last updated: 30 May 2015.

==== Results by round ====
Round	1	2	3	4	5	6	7	8	9	10	11	12	13	14	15	16	17	18	19	20	21	22	23	24	25	26	27	28	29	30	31	32	33	34	35	36
Ground	H	H	A	H	A	H	A	H	A	A	A	H	A	H	A	H	A	H	H	H	A	H	A	H	A	H	A	A	A	H	A	H	A	H	A	H
Result	W	W	D	W	L	W	L	W	W	W	D	D	W	L	W	L	W	W	W	W	W	W	W	W	D	D	W	L	W	W	D	W	W	W	W	D
Position	4	3	3	3	4	3	5	3	3	2	2	2	2	3	3	4	4	3	2	2	1	1	1	1	1	1	1	1	1	1	1	1	1	1	1	1

Updated to match(es) played on 30 May 2015. Source: PrvaLiga website
A = Away; H = Home; W = Win; D = Draw; L = Loss

=== Matches ===
19 July 2014 1	Maribor	1–0	Rudar Velenje	Maribor
20:05 CET	Dervišević (yellow card) 16'; Filipović (yellow card) 33'; Viler 71'	Report	Stjepanović (yellow card) 21'; Knezović (yellow card) 82'	Stadium: Ljudski vrt Attendance: 2,000; Referee: Matej Jug

26 July 2014 2	Maribor	3–2	Radomlje	Maribor
17:00 CET	N'Diaye (yellow card) 7'; Balkovec 21' (o.g.); Bohar (yellow card) 34'; Viler (yellow card) 40'; Zahović 85', 88'	Report	Zavrl 19'; Stoiljković 90+3'	Stadium: Ljudski vrt Attendance: 2,000; Referee: Nejc Kajtazović

8 April 2015 3	Olimpija	0–0	Maribor	Ljubljana
20:05 CET	Matić (yellow card) 12'; Bajrić (yellow card) 57'; Ivančić (yellow card) 89'	Report	N'Diaye (yellow card) 45'; Dervišević (yellow card) 70'; Arghus (yellow card) 76'; Vršič (yellow card) 90+1'	Stadium: Stožice; Attendance: 5,000; Referee: Damir Skomina

9 August 2014 4	Maribor	2–1	Gorica	Maribor
20:05 CET	Tavares 36'; Bohar 40'	Report	Makinwa 13'; Johnson (yellow card) 42'	Stadium: Ljudski vrt Attendance: 5,000; Referee: Roberto Ponis

16 August 2014 5	Celje	3–1	Maribor	Celje
17:00 CET	Klemenčič 3'; Omoregie 25'; Bajde 53'; Žitko (yellow card) 72'	Report	Filipović (yellow card) 7' (red card) 30'; Vrhovec 84' (o.g.)	Stadium: Arena Petrol; Attendance: 3,000; Referee: Damir Skomina

23 August 2014 6	Maribor	3–0	Zavrč	Maribor
20:00 CET	Bohar 8'; Zahović 14'; Mendy 75'	Report	Cvek (yellow card) 76'; Roškar (yellow card) 90+1'	Stadium: Ljudski vrt Attendance: 2,500; Referee: Rade Obrenović

30 August 2014 7	Domžale	2–0	Maribor	Domžale
20:05 CET	Šišić 5'; Parker (yellow card) 39'; Kous 64'	Report		Stadium: Sports Park; Attendance: 2,500; Referee: Matej Jug

13 September 2014 8	Maribor	2–0	Krka	Maribor
16:00 CET	Zahović 22' 38'; Arghus (yellow card) 76'	Report	Žižić (yellow card) 26'; Buden (yellow card) 46'; Šaban (yellow card) 90+2'	Stadium: Ljudski vrt Attendance: 1,800; Referee: Davor Drečnik

20 September 2014 9	Koper	1–2	Maribor	Koper
CET	Ivetić (yellow card) 25'; Žibert 34'; Štulac (yellow card) 61'	Report	Mertelj (yellow card) 30'; Dervišević 45' (f.k.); Rajčević (yellow card) 73' (red card) 76'; Tavares 77'; Mejač (yellow card) 88'; Arghus (yellow card) 90'	Stadium: Bonifika; Attendance: 900; Referee: Mitja Žganec

24 September 2014 10	Rudar Velenje	0–1	Maribor	Velenje
20:05 CET	Jahić (yellow card) 22'; Jelić (yellow card) 24'; Džinić (yellow card) 56'; Klinar (yellow card) 59'	Report	Tavares (yellow card) 36'; Ibraimi (yellow card) 42'; Arghus (yellow card) 64'; Tavares 90+3'	Stadium: Ob Jezeru; Attendance: 1,000; Referee: Bojan Mertik

27 September 2014 11	Radomlje	0–0	Maribor	Domžale
CET	Smrtnik (yellow card) 77'; Andrić (yellow card) 89'; Jakovljević (yellow card) 89'	Report	Vršič (yellow card) 22'; N'Diaye (yellow card) 30'; Mejač (yellow card) 44'; Mendy (yellow card) 59'	Stadium: Sports Park; Attendance: 1,000; Referee: Andrej Žnidaršič

4 October 2014 12	Maribor	3–3	Olimpija	Maribor
20:05 CET	Mendy 13'; Šuler 20' (yellow card) 23'; Mendy (yellow card) 44'; Tavares 90+1'	Report	Vukčević 4'; Šporar 11' (yellow card) 11'; Kapun (yellow card) 18' (goal) 41'	Stadium: Ljudski vrt Attendance: 10,000; Referee: Matej Jug

15 October 2014 13	Gorica	0–2	Maribor	Nova Gorica
CET	Modolo (yellow card) 3'; Johnson (yellow card) 45'; Modolo (red card) 72'	Report	Mertelj (yellow card) 15'; Zahović 44'; Vršič (yellow card) 55'; Zahović 58'; Arghus (yellow card) 86'	Stadium: Sports Park; Attendance: 650; Referee: Miran Bukovec

18 October 2014 14	Maribor	1–2	Celje	Maribor
20:05 CET	Filipović (yellow card) 12'; Viler (yellow card) 28'; Zahović 30'; Viler (red card) 37'; Stojanović (yellow card) 80'; Ibraimi (yellow card) 88'	Report	Rajčević 6' (o.g.); Omoregie 65'; Ahmedi (yellow card) 73'; Miškić (yellow card) 88'; Kotnik (yellow card) 90'	Stadium: Ljudski vrt Attendance: 4,500; Referee: Damir Skomina

25 October 2014 15	Zavrč	0–1	Maribor	Zavrč
CET	Cvek (yellow card) 13'; Antolek (yellow card) 45'; Matjašič (yellow card) 84'	Report	Filipović (yellow card) 8'; Ibraimi (yellow card) 41'; Tavares 70' (pen.); Zahović (yellow card) 82'	Stadium: Sports Park; Attendance: 1,100; Referee: Dejan Balažič

31 October 2014 16	Maribor	0–1	Domžale	Maribor
CET	Mertelj (yellow card) 35'; Viler (yellow card) 55'; Stojanović (yellow card) 89'; Zahović (red card) 90+2'; Mendy (yellow card) 90+5'	Report	Aneff 3'; Maksimović (yellow card) 40'; Morel (yellow card) 45'; Janža (yellow card) 47'	Stadium: Ljudski vrt Attendance: 4,000; Referee: Matej Jug

9 November 2014 17	Krka	1–3	Maribor	Novo Mesto
14:00 CET	Buden (yellow card) 52'; Palić 65' (pen.); Jurić (yellow card) 83'; Rašić (yellow card) 90+3'	Report	Tavares 31'; Sallalich 37'; Bohar (yellow card) 52'; Vršič (yellow card) 59'; Stojanović (yellow card) 63'; Mendy 78'	Stadium: Portoval; Attendance: 700; Referee: Rade Obrenović

22 November 2014 18	Maribor	4–0	Koper	Maribor
16:00 CET	Tavares 11'; Mendy 28'; Arghus 38'; Stojanović (yellow card) 55'; Biton 88'	Report	Lotrič (yellow card) 19'	Stadium: Ljudski vrt Attendance: 4,500; Referee: Nejc Kajtazović

29 November 2014 19	Maribor	3–2	Rudar Velenje	Maribor
14:00 CET	Tavares 23'; Zahović 26'; Tavares 72'; Biton (yellow card) 87'; Pušaver (yellow card) 90'	Report	Džinić (yellow card) 75'; Jelić 82' 90+3'	Stadium: Ljudski vrt Attendance: 1,800; Referee: Bojan Mertik

6 December 2014 20	Maribor	4–1	Radomlje	Maribor
16:00 CET	Bohar 24'; Tavares 26'; Sallalich 32'; Filipović (yellow card) 45'; Tavares (yellow card) 48'; Bohar 57'; Arghus (yellow card) 72'	Report	Zorc (yellow card) 20'; Centrih (yellow card) 44'; Vuk (yellow card) 53'; Zavrl 69'; Centrih (red card) 77'	Stadium: Ljudski vrt Attendance: 1,200; Referee: Miran Bukovec

4 March 2015 21	Olimpija	0–1	Maribor	Ljubljana
20:05 CET	Kapun (red card) 84'; Zajc (yellow card) 89'	Report	Stojanović (yellow card) 39'; N'Diaye 41'; Filipović (yellow card) 43'; Šuler (yellow card) 44'; Zahović (yellow card) 54'; N'Diaye (yellow card) 86'	Stadium: Stožice; Attendance: 6,500; Referee: Matej Jug

28 February 2015 22	Maribor	5–1	Gorica	Maribor
16:00 CET	Volaš 3' 43'; Bohar (yellow card) 57'; Zahović 81'; Mertelj (yellow card) 84'; Tavares 85'; Stojanović (yellow card) 90+2'; Volaš 90+3'	Report	Innocenti (yellow card) 11'; Džuzdanović (yellow card) 16'; Eleke (yellow card) 24' (goal) 30'; Taïder (yellow card) 83'	Stadium: Ljudski vrt Attendance: 4,000; Referee: Asmir Sagrković

7 March 2015 23	Celje	0–2	Maribor	Celje
14:15 CET	Soria (yellow card) 22'; Vidmajer (yellow card) 67'	Report	Mendy 45+1'; Viler (yellow card) 57'; N'Diaye 84'	Stadium: Arena Petrol; Attendance: 3,400; Referee: Nejc Kajtazović

14 March 2015 24	Maribor	2–1	Zavrč	Maribor
16:00 CET	Ibraimi 50' (pen.); Rajčević (yellow card) 52'; Tavares 77'	Report	Muminović 29'; Polić (yellow card) 77'; Petanjek (yellow card) 85'; Novoselec (yellow card) 86'	Stadium: Ljudski vrt Attendance: 4,000; Referee: Mitja Žganec

21 March 2015 25	Domžale	0–0	Maribor	Domžale
16:00 CET	Juninho (yellow card) 66'	Report	Stojanović (yellow card) 11'; Viler (yellow card) 25'; Šuler (yellow card) 64'	Stadium: Sports Park; Attendance: 2,500; Referee: Damir Skomina

4 April 2015 26	Maribor	2–2	Krka	Maribor
CET	Marko Šuler 22' (yellow card) 47'; Dervišević (yellow card) 51'; Sallalich (yellow card) 54'; Šuler (red card) 61'; Tavares 81'	Report	Kastrevec 48'; Mojstrovič (yellow card) 49'; Palić 52' (pen.); Ejup (yellow card) 66'; Mitrović (yellow card) 70'; Palić (yellow card) 83'	Stadium: Ljudski vrt Attendance: 2,000; Referee: Roman Glažar

11 April 2015 27	Koper	1–4	Maribor	Koper
CET	Tomić (yellow card) 9'; Adam (red card) 21'; Galešić (yellow card) 53'; Gregorič (yellow card) 54'; Blažič 90'	Report	Volaš 24' (pen.); Mertelj (yellow card) 27'; Bohar 29'; Stojanović (yellow card) 38'; Zahović 45'; Volaš 56' (pen.); Stojanović (red card) 64'; Bohar (yellow card) 82'	Stadium: Bonifika; Attendance: 1,000; Referee: Dejan Balažič

18 April 2015 28	Rudar Velenje	2–0	Maribor	Velenje
20:05 CET	Radujko (yellow card) 29'; Babić 45'; Klinar (yellow card) 47'; Stjepanović (yellow card) 57'; Knezović 71' (yellow card) 82'; Bolha (yellow card) 90+3'	Report	Arghus (yellow card) 33'; Dervišević (yellow card) 37'; Stojanović (yellow card) 41'; Rajčević (red card) 55'; Ibraimi (yellow card) 84'	Stadium: Ob Jezeru; Attendance: 1,100; Referee: Damir Skomina

24 April 2015 29	Radomlje	1–6	Maribor	Domžale
19:00 CET	Barukčič (yellow card) 31'; Vuk 66'	Report	Zahović 12'; Tavares 16'; Viler 26'; Hotić (yellow card) 75'; Volaš 80'; Tavares 86'; Volaš 90+1'	Stadium: Sports Park; Attendance: 500; Referee: Roberto Ponis

29 April 2015 30	Maribor	4–1	Olimpija	Maribor
17:00 CET	Bohar 8'; Mertelj (yellow card) 48'; Stojanović (yellow card) 61'; Bohar 75'; Vršič 77'; Rajčević 87'	Report	Bajrić 24'; Fink (yellow card) 39'; Vukčević (yellow card) 63'	Stadium: Ljudski vrt Attendance: 8,500; Referee: Nejc Kajtazović

2 May 2014 31	Gorica	1–1	Maribor	Nova Gorica
17:00 CET	Širok (red card) 16'; Pasqualini (yellow card) 37'; Johnson (yellow card) 47'; Napoli (yellow card) 65'; Eleke 74'; Sorčan (yellow card) 90+3'	Report	Mertelj 9'; Mendy (yellow card) 21'; Vršič (yellow card) 73'	Stadium: Sports Park; Attendance: 480; Referee: Dragoslav Perić

6 May 2015 32	Maribor	4–1	Celje	Maribor
17:00 CET	Šuler 16'; Stojanović (yellow card) 25'; Volaš 29'; Ibraimi 56' (f.k.); Volaš 90+1'	Report	Jeslínek (yellow card) 33'; Verbič (yellow card) 49'; Lendrić 53' (pen.); Gobec (yellow card) 61'; Bajde (yellow card) 81'	Stadium: Ljudski vrt Attendance: 6,000; Referee: Damir Skomina

9 May 2015 33	Zavrč	1–3	Maribor	Zavrč
20:00 CET	Novoselec (yellow card) 45'; Zorko 47'; Antić (yellow card) 85'; Težak (yellow card) 89'	Report	Mertelj (yellow card) 52'; Sallalich 55'; Volaš 60'; Tavares 79'; Zahović (yellow card) 90+3'	Stadium: Sports Park; Attendance: 1,000; Referee: Dejan Balažič

16 May 2015 34	Maribor	1–0	Domžale	Maribor
20:05 CET	Vujčić (yellow card) 47'; Volaš (yellow card) 56'; Stojanović (yellow card) 60'; Ibraimi (yellow card) 61'; Vujčić (red card) 63'; Tavares 73'; Šuler (yellow card) 87'	Report	Horić (yellow card) 18'; Črnic (yellow card) 84'	Stadium: Ljudski vrt Attendance: 7,500; Referee: Dragoslav Perić

23 May 2015 35	Krka	1–3	Maribor	Novo Mesto
17:00 CET	Kramar (yellow card) 38'; Welbeck (yellow card) 63'; Aniekan 84'; Ejup (yellow card) 86'	Report	Sallalich 37'; Mendy 45'; Arghus (yellow card) 54'; Mendy (yellow card) 58'; Rajčević (yellow card) 66'; Dervišević (yellow card) 74'; Sallalich 82'	Stadium: Portoval; Attendance: 300; Referee: Matej Jug

30 May 2015 36	Maribor	0–0	Koper	Maribor
17:00 CET	Mertelj (yellow card) 62'; Šuler (yellow card) 77'; Hotić (yellow card) 90'	Report	Rahmanović (yellow card) 3'; Hadžić (yellow card) 35'	Stadium: Ljudski vrt Attendance: 8,000; Referee: Roman Glažar

Colour key: Green = Maribor win; Yellow = draw; Red = opponents win.

Notes

1. The match between Olimpija and Maribor was originally scheduled on 2 August 2014, but was postponed and rescheduled to a later date, on the request of Olimpija which argued that, due to the summer holliday season, a match at a later date would attract more fans to the stands.
2. The second part of the season was scheduled to begin on 21 February 2015, however, the Football Association of Slovenia have postponed all matches of the 21st round due to "poor weather conditions". The round was rescheduled to 4 March 2015.

== Slovenian Cup ==
28 October 2014 Round of 16	Maribor	1–0	Radomlje	Maribor
20:00 CET	Zahović 25'; Rajčević (yellow card) 48'	Report	Bajalica (yellow card) 37'; Zavrl (yellow card) 42'; Centrih (yellow card) 71'; Lidjan (yellow card) 74'	Stadium: Ljudski vrt Attendance: 2,000; Referee: Roman Glažar

19 November 2014 Quarter-finals 1st leg	Krka	1–2	Maribor	Novo Mesto
14:00 CET	Dežmar (yellow card) 16'; Fuček 24'; Mitrović (red card) 31'; Kastrevec (yellow card) 56'; Žižić (yellow card) 64'; Palić (yellow card) 82'; Ejup (yellow card) 90+3'	Report	Mendy 35'; N'Diaye (yellow card) 38'; Šuler (yellow card) 56'; Sallalich (yellow card) 63'; Mejač 65'	Stadium: Portoval; Attendance: 300; Referee: Asmir Sagrković

3 December 2014 Quarter-finals 2nd leg	Maribor	4–2 (6–3 agg.)	Krka	Maribor
17:30 CET	Bohar 23'; Zahović 66'; Bohar 68'; Biton 72'	Report	Kastrevec 4'; Žugelj (yellow card) 16'; Fuček 63'	Stadium: Ljudski vrt Attendance: 1,200; Referee: Dejan Balažič

15 April 2015 Semi-finals 1st leg	Maribor	2–3	Celje	Maribor
17:00 CET	Tavares 53'; Janža (yellow card) 58'; Volaš 66'; Vršič (yellow card) 70'; Tavares (yellow card) 89'; Šuler (yellow card) 90'	Report	Omoregie 11'; Bajde (yellow card) 64'; Verbič (yellow card) 76'; Vrhovec 88'; Lendrić 90+3'	Stadium: Ljudski vrt Attendance: 3,000; Referee: Dejan Balažič

21 April 2015 Semi-finals 2nd leg	Celje	0–0 (3–2 agg.)	Maribor	Celje
17:00 CET	Miškić (yellow card) 43'; Šporn (yellow card) 55'; Omoregie (yellow card) 82'	Report	Arghus (yellow card) 9'; Dervišević (yellow card) 27'; Janža (yellow card) 29'; N'Diaye (yellow card) 43'	Stadium: Arena Petrol; Attendance: 3,800; Referee: Mitja Žganec

Colour key: Green = Maribor win; Yellow = draw; Red = opponents win.

Notes

3. The match between Maribor and Radomlje was originally scheduled on 17 September, however, the match was postponed and rescheduled to a later date due to Maribor's UEFA campaign.
4. The quarter-final matches between Krka and Maribor were postponed and rescheduled to a later date, as during the original first and second leg schedule (i.e. 22 October 2014 and 29 October 2014) the opponent of Krka was not established.

== UEFA Champions League ==
=== Second qualifying round ===
15 July 2014 First leg	Zrinjski Mostar (Bosnia and Herzegovina)	0–0	(Slovenia) Maribor	Mostar, Bosnia and Herzegovina
19:30 CET	Šćepanović (yellow card) 18'; Muminović (yellow card) 24' (yellow card) 90+1' (red card)	Report; Report	Tavares (yellow card) 84'	Stadium: Stadion pod Bijelim Brijegom; Attendance: 5,100; Referee: Carlos del Cerro Grande (Spain)

22 July 2014 Second leg	Maribor (Slovenia)	2–0 (2–0 agg.)	(Bosnia and Herzegovina) Zrinjski Mostar	Maribor, Slovenia
20:00 CET	Mendy (yellow card) 30'; Vršič 45' (f.k.); Ibraimi 57' (pen.); Šuler (yellow card) 62'	Report; Report	Stojkić (yellow card) 50'; Dujković (yellow card) 56'; Šćepanović (yellow card) 56'	Stadium: Ljudski vrt Attendance: 7,500; Referee: Sergey Lapochkin (Russia)

Colour key: Green = Maribor win; Yellow = draw; Red = opponents win.

=== Third qualifying round ===
30 July 2014 First leg	Maribor (Slovenia)	1–0	(Israel) Maccabi Tel Aviv	Maribor, Slovenia
20:30 CET	Dervišević (yellow card) 45'; Bohar 90+4'	Report; Report	Yeini (yellow card) 86'; Pablo (yellow card) 89'	Stadium: Ljudski vrt Attendance: 8,120; Referee: Ivan Kružliak (Slovakia)

5 August 2014 Second leg	Maccabi Tel Aviv (Israel)	2–2 (2–3 agg.)	(Slovenia) Maribor	Larnaca, Cyprus
20:00 CET	Ben Haim 42'; Yeini (yellow card) 45'; Ben Basat 54'	Report; Report	Ibraimi 36' 55'	Stadium: Antonis Papadopoulos Stadium; Attendance: 752; Referee: Martin Strömbergsson (Sweden)

Colour key: Green = Maribor win; Yellow = draw; Red = opponents win.

Notes

5. Due to 2014 Israel–Gaza conflict, the UEFA Emergency Panel decided that Israeli clubs must play their home legs outside of the country in the third qualifying round.

=== Play-off round ===
20 August 2014 First leg	Maribor (Slovenia)	1–1	(Scotland) Celtic	Maribor, Slovenia
20:45 CET	Bohar 14'; Filipović (yellow card) 51'	Report; Report	McGregor 6' (yellow card) 75'; Lustig (yellow card) 90+2'	Stadium: Ljudski vrt Attendance: 11,400; Referee: Pavel Královec (Czech Republic)

26 August 2014 Second leg	Celtic (Scotland)	0–1 (1–2 agg.)	(Slovenia) Maribor	Glasgow, Scotland
20:45 CET	Commons (yellow card) 48' van Dijk (yellow card) 88'; Boerrigter (yellow card) 89'	Report; Report	Šuler (yellow card) 52'; Rajčević (yellow card) 54'; Tavares 75'; Stojanović (yellow card) 79'; Tavares (yellow card) 85'	Stadium: Celtic Park; Attendance: 55,415; Referee: Viktor Kassai (Hungary)

Colour key: Green = Maribor win; Yellow = draw; Red = opponents win.

=== Group G ===
Pos	Team	Pld	W	D	L	GF	GA	GD	Pts	Qualification	CHE	SCH	SPO	MRB
1	(England) Chelsea	6	4	2	0	17	3	+14	14	Advance to knockout phase	—	1–1	3–1	6–0
2	(Germany) Schalke 04	6	2	2	2	9	14	−5	8	Advance to knockout phase	0–5	—	4–3	1–1
3	(Portugal) Sporting CP	6	2	1	3	12	12	0	7	Transfer to Europa League	0–1	4–2	—	3–1
4	(Slovenia) Maribor	6	0	3	3	4	13	−9	3		1–1	0–1	1–1	—

Source: UEFA
Rules for classification: Group stage tiebreakers

17 September 2014 1	Maribor (Slovenia)	1–1	(Portugal) Sporting CP	Maribor, Slovenia
20:45 CET	Tavares (yellow card) 22'; Ibraimi (yellow card) 89'; Zahović 90+2'	Report; Report	Maurício (yellow card) 42'; Nani 80'	Stadium: Ljudski vrt Attendance: 12,211; Referee: Clément Turpin (France)

30 September 2014 2	Schalke 04 (Germany)	1–1	(Slovenia) Maribor	Gelsenkirchen, Germany
20:45 CET	Huntelaar 56'; Boateng (yellow card) 71'	Report; Report	Bohar 36'; Filipović (yellow card) 50'; Viler (yellow card) 56'; Mertelj (yellow card) 76'; Ibraimi (yellow card) 85'	Stadium: Veltins-Arena; Attendance: 47,997; Referee: Carlos Velasco Carballo (Spain)

21 October 2014 3	Chelsea (England)	6–0	(Slovenia) Maribor	London, England
20:45 CET	Rémy 13'; Drogba 23' (pen.); Terry 31'; Viler 54' (o.g.); Hazard 77' (pen.) 90'	Report; Report		Stadium: Stamford Bridge; Attendance: 41,126; Referee: Danny Makkelie (Netherlands)

5 November 2014 4	Maribor (Slovenia)	1–1	(England) Chelsea	Maribor, Slovenia
20:45 CET	Filipović (yellow card) 36'; Ibraimi 50'; Stojanović (yellow card) 53'; Viler (yellow card) 85'	Report; Report	Luís (yellow card) 24'; Matić 73'	Stadium: Ljudski vrt Attendance: 12,646; Referee: Daniele Orsato (Italy)

25 November 2014 5	Sporting CP (Portugal)	3–1	(Slovenia) Maribor	Lisbon, Portugal
20:45 CET	Mané 10'; Nani 35'; Cédric (yellow card) 61'; Slimani 65'	Report; Report	Tavares (yellow card) 40'; Jefferson 42' (o.g.); Stojanović (yellow card) 49'; Arghus (yellow card) 61'	Stadium: Estádio José Alvalade; Attendance: 32,739; Referee: Craig Thomson (Scotland)

10 December 2014 6	Maribor (Slovenia)	0–1	(Germany) Schalke 04	Maribor, Slovenia
20:45 CET		Report; Report	Meyer 62'	Stadium: Ljudski vrt Attendance: 12,516; Referee: Szymon Marciniak (Poland)

Colour key: Green = Maribor win; Yellow = draw; Red = opponents win.

== Friendlies ==
21 June 2014 1	Team Rogla	2–4	Maribor	Rogla, Slovenia
12:00 CET	Alenc 24'; Čakš 26'	Report	Sirk 15', 17'; Moravac 38'; Vršič 45'	Stadium: Rogla Football Field; Attendance: 150; Referee: Iztok Gornjak

26 June 2014 2	Maribor (Slovenia)	0–1	(Azerbaijan) Gabala	Bakovci, Slovenia
18:00 CET		Report	Rafael Santos 14'	Stadium: ŠRC Bakovci

29 June 2014 3	Maribor (Slovenia)	5–0	(Hungary) Dunaújváros	Bakovci, Slovenia
18:00 CET	Mendy 6'; Dervišević 40'; Fajić 57', 78'; Cvijanović 77'	Report		Stadium: ŠRC Bakovci

2 July 2014 4	Maribor (Slovenia)	1–2	(Romania) Petrolul Ploiești	Maribor, Slovenia
19:00 CET	Bohar 37'	Report	Gerson 72'; Mutu 87' (pen.)	Stadium: Ljudski vrt Referee: Alen Borošak

6 July 2014 5	Maribor (Slovenia)	2–2	(Croatia) Zadar	Bakovci, Slovenia
18:15 CET	Cvijanović 4' (pen.); Šuler 47'	Report	Ivančić 2'; Pešić 84'; Bilaver (red card) 89'	Stadium: ŠRC Bakovci

7 July 2014 6	Maribor (Slovenia)	1–0	(Denmark) Copenhagen	Maribor, Slovenia
19:00 CET	Živko 90'	Report		Stadium: Ljudski vrt Attendance: 400; Referee: Tadej Mežnar

10 July 2014 7	Maribor (Slovenia)	1–2	(Ukraine) Karpaty Lviv	Maribor, Slovenia
19:30 CET	Šuler 66'	Report	Holodyuk 55'; Puchkovskyi 77'	Stadium: Ljudski vrt Attendance: 400; Referee: Bojan Tkalčič

1 August 2014 8	Maribor	3–2	Maribor B	Rogoza, Slovenia
	Moravac 55'; N'Diaye 61'; Črnic 77'	Report	Hotić 30'; Cvijanović 82'	Stadium: Sports Park

14 January 2015 9	Maribor (Slovenia)	4–0	(Hungary) ZTE	Lendava, Slovenia
15:30 CET	Vršič 35'; Volaš 58'; Sirk 85'; Ibraimi 87'	Report		Stadium: Lendava Sports Park (artificial turf); Attendance: 150; Referee: Miran Bukovec

17 January 2015 10	Aluminij	1–2	Maribor	Kidričevo, Slovenia
14:00 CET	Petek 9'	Report	Dodlek 12'; Tavares 49' (pen.)	Stadium: Sports Park; Attendance: 150; Referee: Peter Mertelj

20 January 2015 11	Maribor (Slovenia)	3–1	(Hungary) Dunaújváros	Lendava, Slovenia
16:00 CET	Volaš 31'; Bohar 37'; Mendy 49'	Report	Papp 78' (pen.)	Stadium: Lendava Sports Park (artificial turf); Attendance: 100; Referee: Miran Bukovec

22 January 2015 12	Maribor (Slovenia)	3–0	(Croatia) Hrvatski Dragovoljac	Lendava, Slovenia
16:00 CET	N'Diaye 28'; Volaš 30'; Bohar 85'	Report		Stadium: Lendava Sports Park (artificial turf); Attendance: 100; Referee: Bojan Mertik

29 January 2015 13	Kapfenberger SV (Austria)	0–5	(Slovenia) Maribor	Maria Lankowitz, Austria
15:30 CET		Report	Ibraimi 25'; Tavares 41'; Mendy 65', 74', 78'	Stadium: Maria Lankowitz Training Center; Attendance: 100

3 February 2015 14	Maribor (Slovenia)	2–2	(Poland) Bełchatów	Belek, Turkey
14:00 CET	N'Diaye 15'; Mendy 32'	Report	Mak 52'; Olszar 68'	Stadium: Susesi Sport Center; Referee: Tomasz Wajda (Poland)

4 February 2015 15	Maribor (Slovenia)	2–2	(Belarus) BATE Borisov	Belek, Turkey
16:00 CET	Volaš 60'; Zahović 85'	Report	Rodionov 15'; Gordeichuk 18'	Stadium: Susesi Sport Center; Referee: Paweł Raczkowski (Poland)

7 February 2015 16	Maribor (Slovenia)	2–0	(Bulgaria) Litex Lovech	Belek, Turkey
18:00 CET	Vršič 69' (pen.); Zahović 77'	Report		Stadium: Susesi Sport Center; Referee: Sevket Simsek (Turkey)

8 February 2015 17	Maribor (Slovenia)	0–0	(Romania) Steaua	Belek, Turkey
19:00 CET		Report		Stadium: Susesi Sport Center; Referee: Georgiy Vodochkoriya (Georgia)

11 February 2015 18	Maribor (Slovenia)	3–2	(Hungary) Győr	Belek, Turkey
18:00 CET	Volaš 16' 28'; Tavares 76'	Report	Priskin 65' (pen.) 90' (pen.)	Stadium: Susesi Sport Center; Referee: Attila Molnar (Hungary)

12 February 2015 19	Maribor (Slovenia)	1–2	(Serbia) Partizan	Belek, Turkey
18:00 CET	Ibraimi 29' (pen.)	Report	Bogosavac 9'; Šaponjić 47'	Stadium: Susesi Sport Center; Referee: Ahmet Esref Sari (Turkey)

21 February 2015 20	Maribor	3–0	Rudar Velenje	Maribor, Slovenia
15:00 CET	Ibraimi 57'; Volaš 71'; Džinić 88' (o.g.)	Report		Stadium: Ljudski vrt Referee: Alen Borošak

28 March 2015 21	Maribor (Slovenia)	5–1	(Croatia) Lokomotiva	Rogoza, Slovenia
16:00 CET	Tavares 33' 41'; Mendy 45' 53' 75'	Report	Begonja 66'	Stadium: Sports Park; Referee: Tadej Mežnar (Slovenia)

Colour key: Green = Maribor win; Yellow = draw; Red = opponents win.

== Squad statistics ==
=== Key ===
Players

- No. = Shirt number
- Pos. = Playing position
- GK = Goalkeeper
- DF = Defender
- MF = Midfielder
- FW = Forward

Nationality

- = Bosnia and Herzegovina
- = Brazil
- = Croatia
- = France
- = Israel
- (North Macedonia) = Macedonia
- = Montenegro
- = Senegal
- = Slovenia
- = Ukraine

Competitions

- Apps = Appearances
- = Yellow card
- (red card) = Red card

Key
‡	The player was selected in the official 2014–15 Slovenian PrvaLiga team of the season
#	The player was the top scorer in the respective competition

=== Foreign players ===
Below is the list of foreign players who have made appearances for the club during the 2014–15 season. Players primary citizenship is listed first.

EU Nationals

- (Croatia) (Slovenia) Sven Dodlek
- (Croatia) Matko Obradović
- (France) Jean-Philippe Mendy

EU Nationals (Dual citizenship)

- (Brazil) (Italy) Arghus
- (Brazil) (Slovenia) Marcos Tavares

Non-EU Nationals

- (Bosnia and Herzegovina) Nusmir Fajić
- (North Macedonia) Agim Ibraimi
- (Senegal) Welle N'Diaye
- (Israel) Dudu Biton
- (Israel) Sintayehu Sallalich

=== Appearances and goals ===
Correct as of 30 May 2015, match v. Koper. Flags indicate national team as has been defined under FIFA eligibility rules. Players may hold more than one non-FIFA nationality. The players squad numbers, playing positions, nationalities and statistics are based solely on match reports in Matches sections above and the official website of NK Maribor and the Slovenian PrvaLiga. Only the players, which made at least one appearance for the first team, are listed.

List of Maribor players, who represented the team during the 2014–15 season, and displaying their statistics during that timeframe
No.	Pos.	Name	Apps	Goals	Apps	Goals	Apps	Goals	Apps	Goals	Apps	Goals
No.	Pos.	Name	League		Cup		Supercup		Champions League		Total	
1	GK	(Slovenia) Aljaž Cotman	1	0	4	0	1	0	—	—	6	0
3	DF	(Slovenia) Erik Janža	6	0	2	0	—	—	—	—	8	0
4	DF	(Slovenia) Marko Šuler	24	3	3	0	1	0	8	0	36	3
5	MF	(Slovenia) Željko Filipović	14	0	3	0	—	—	12	0	29	0
6	MF	(Senegal) Welle N'Diaye	15	2	2	0	1	0	2	0	20	2
7	DF	(Slovenia) Aleš Mejač	21	0	2	1	1	0	3	0	27	1
8	MF	(Israel) Sintayehu Sallalich	27	5	3	0	1	0	8	0	39	5
9	FW	(Brazil) Marcos Tavares ‡	34	17 #	3	1	—	—	12	1	49	19
10	MF	(North Macedonia) Agim Ibraimi ‡	24	2	3	0	—	—	12	4	39	6
11	FW	(Slovenia) Luka Zahović	30	12	3	2	1	0	5	1	39	15
14	FW	(France) Jean-Philippe Mendy	26	6	4	1	1	0	12	0	43	7
15	FW	(Slovenia) Rok Sirk	—	—	1	0	—	—	—	—	1	0
16	DF	(Slovenia) Damjan Vuklišević	3	0	1	0	1	1	—	—	5	1
17	FW	(Bosnia and Herzegovina) Nusmir Fajić	4	0	—	—	1	1	2	0	7	1
17	FW	(Slovenia) Dalibor Volaš	14	10	2	1	—	—	—	—	16	11
20	FW	(Israel) Dudu Biton	11	1	3	1	—	—	—	—	14	2
21	MF	(Slovenia) Amir Dervišević	16	1	3	0	1	0	6	0	26	1
22	MF	(Slovenia) Dare Vršič	26	1	5	0	1	2 #	11	1	43	4
23	MF	(Slovenia) Dino Hotić	4	0	1	0	—	—	—	—	5	0
24	DF	(Slovenia) Dejan Trajkovski	1	0	—	—	—	—	—	—	1	0
24	MF	(Slovenia) Dejan Vokić	2	0	1	0	—	—	—	—	3	0
26	DF	(Slovenia) Aleksander Rajčević ‡	31	1	2	0	—	—	12	0	45	1
28	DF	(Slovenia) Mitja Viler ‡	28	2	4	0	1	0	11	0	44	2
30	DF	(Slovenia) Petar Stojanović ‡	23	0	1	0	1	0	11	0	36	0
31	DF	(Slovenia) Daniel Vujčić	2	0	—	—	—	—	—	—	2	0
33	GK	(Slovenia) Jasmin Handanović	34	0	1	0	—	—	12	0	47	0
36	DF	(Slovenia) Žiga Živko	1	0	2	0	—	—	—	—	3	0
39	MF	(Slovenia) Damjan Bohar	33	7	4	2	—	—	12	3	49	12
40	MF	(Croatia) Sven Dodlek	—	—	1	0	—	—	—	—	1	0
44	DF	(Brazil) Arghus	15	1	1	0	—	—	4	0	20	1
45	DF	(Slovenia) Robert Pušaver	1	0	2	0	—	—	—	—	3	0
69	GK	(Croatia) Matko Obradović	1	0	—	—	—	—	—	—	1	0
70	MF	(Slovenia) Aleš Mertelj	28	1	3	0	1	0	10	0	42	1
97	MF	(Slovenia) Martin Kramarič	1	0	—	—	—	—	—	—	1	0

=== Discipline ===
Correct as of 30 May 2015, match v. Koper. Flags indicate national team as has been defined under FIFA eligibility rules. Players may hold more than one non-FIFA nationality. The players squad numbers, playing positions, nationalities and statistics are based solely on match reports in Matches sections above and the official website of NK Maribor and the Slovenian PrvaLiga. If a player received two yellow cards in a match and was subsequently sent off the numbers count as two yellow cards, one red card.

List of Maribor players, who represented the team during the 2014–15 season, and displaying their statistics during that timeframe
No.	Pos.	Name	Yellow card	Red card	Yellow card	Red card	Yellow card	Red card	Yellow card	Red card	Yellow card	Red card
No.	Pos.	Name	League		Cup		Supercup		Champions League		Total	
3	DF	(Slovenia) Erik Janža	0	0	2	0	—	—	—	—	2	0
4	DF	(Slovenia) Marko Šuler	7	1	2	0	0	0	2	0	11	1
5	MF	(Slovenia) Željko Filipović	7	1	0	0	—	—	3	0	10	1
6	MF	(Senegal) Welle N'Diaye	4	0	2	0	0	0	0	0	6	0
7	DF	(Slovenia) Aleš Mejač	2	0	1	0	0	0	—	—	3	0
8	MF	(Israel) Sintayehu Sallalich	1	0	0	0	0	0	0	0	1	0
9	FW	(Brazil) Marcos Tavares ‡	2	0	1	0	—	—	4	0	7	0
10	MF	(North Macedonia) Agim Ibraimi ‡	5	0	0	0	—	—	2	0	7	0
11	FW	(Slovenia) Luka Zahović	3	1	0	0	0	0	0	0	3	1
14	FW	(France) Jean-Philippe Mendy	5	0	0	0	0	0	1	0	6	0
16	DF	(Slovenia) Damjan Vuklišević	0	0	—	—	1	0	—	—	1	0
17	FW	(Slovenia) Dalibor Volaš	1	0	0	0	—	—	—	—	1	0
20	FW	(Israel) Dudu Biton	1	0	0	0	—	—	—	—	1	0
21	MF	(Slovenia) Amir Dervišević	5	0	1	0	0	0	1	0	7	0
22	MF	(Slovenia) Dare Vršič	5	0	1	0	0	0	0	0	6	0
23	MF	(Slovenia) Dino Hotić	2	0	0	0	—	—	—	—	2	0
26	DF	(Slovenia) Aleksander Rajčević ‡	4	2	1	0	—	—	1	0	6	2
28	DF	(Slovenia) Mitja Viler ‡	6	1	0	0	0	0	2	0	8	1
30	DF	(Slovenia) Petar Stojanović ‡	13	1	0	0	0	0	3	0	16	1
31	DF	(Slovenia) Daniel Vujčić	2	1	—	—	—	—	—	—	2	1
39	MF	(Slovenia) Damjan Bohar	4	0	0	0	—	—	0	0	4	0
44	DF	(Brazil) Arghus	8	0	1	0	—	—	1	0	10	0
45	DF	(Slovenia) Robert Pušaver	1	0	0	0	—	—	—	—	1	0
70	MF	(Slovenia) Aleš Mertelj	8	0	0	0	0	0	1	0	9	0

== Transfers and loans ==
=== Summer transfer window ===
Transfer	Position	Name	From / last	To	Note
Transfer out	MF	(Croatia) Dejan Mezga	Maribor	Hajduk Split	Contract expired
Transfer out	DF	(Slovenia) Martin Milec	Maribor	Standard Liège	Undisclosed transfer fee, alleged to be around €1,3 million
Transfer in	MF	(Israel) Sintayehu Sallalich	Maccabi Haifa	Maribor	Free transfer
Transfer in	MF	(Senegal) Welle N'Diaye	Gorica	Maribor	Free transfer
Transfer out	FW	(Slovenia) Alen Ploj	Maribor	Aluminij	Free transfer
Transfer out	GK	(Slovenia) Marko Pridigar	Maribor	Free agent	Contract expired
Loan out	DF	(Slovenia) Matjaž Kek	Maribor	Veržej	Loaned out
Loan out	/	(Slovenia) David Borenović	Maribor	Aluminij	Loaned out
Loan out	MF	(Slovenia) Nejc Pečovnik	Maribor	Aluminij	Loaned out
Transfer out	MF	(Slovenia) Goran Cvijanović	Maribor	Rijeka	Undisclosed transfer fee, alleged to be around €100,000
Transfer in	GK	(Slovenia) Tadej Trajkovski	SV Wildon	Maribor	Free transfer
Loan out	GK	(Slovenia) Tadej Trajkovski	Maribor	Bistrica	Loaned out
Transfer in	GK	(Croatia) Matko Obradović	Krka	Maribor	Undisclosed transfer fee, alleged to be around €40,000
Transfer in	MF	(Slovenia) Martin Kramarič	Krka	Maribor	Undisclosed transfer fee, alleged to be around €80,000
Loan in	FW	(Israel) Dudu Biton	Standard Liège	Maribor	Loaned until the end of the season
Transfer out	MF	(Slovenia) Timotej Dodlek	Maribor	Dunaújváros PASE	Free transfer
Transfer out	MF	(Slovenia) Emir Dautović	Maribor	Free agent	Contract terminated
Transfer in	DF	(Montenegro) Luka Uskoković	Budućnost Podgorica	Maribor	Free transfer
Loan in	DF	(Slovenia) Žiga Šoštarič	Drava Ptuj	Maribor	Loaned until the end of the season

=== Winter transfer window ===
Transfer	Position	Name	From / last	To	Note
Transfer in	FW	(Slovenia) Dalibor Volaš	Debreceni	Maribor	Free transfer
Transfer in	DF	(Slovenia) Erik Janža	Domžale	Maribor	Undisclosed transfer fee and Matic Črnic and Dejan Trajkovski heading the other way
Transfer out	DF	(Slovenia) Dejan Trajkovski	Domžale	Maribor	Part of Erik Janža transfer
Transfer out	MF	(Slovenia) Matic Črnic	Domžale	Maribor	Part of Erik Janža transfer
Transfer out	FW	(Israel) Dudu Biton	Maribor	Hapoel Tel Aviv	Free transfer
Transfer in	MF	(Slovenia) Dejan Vokić	Bravo	Maribor	Free transfer
Transfer out	FW	(Bosnia and Herzegovina) Nusmir Fajić	Maribor	Dinamo Minsk	Undisclosed transfer fee, alleged to be around €200,000
Transfer in	DF	(Ukraine) Alexei Antonov	Oleksandriya	Maribor	Free transfer

== See also ==
- List of NK Maribor seasons
