= Amir Dervišević =

Slovenian footballer

Personal information
- Full name: Amir Dervišević
- Date of birth: 4 July 1992 (age 34)
- Place of birth: Ljubljana, Slovenia
- Height: 1.95 m (6 ft 5 in)
- Position: Midfielder

Team information
- Current team: ATUS Ferlach
- Number: 21

Youth career
- –2011: Factor / Interblock
- 2009: → Svoboda (loan)

Senior career*
| Years | Team | Apps | (Gls) |
| 2011–2012 | Interblock | 6 | (0) |
| 2012–2013 | Krka | 23 | (10) |
| 2013–2021 | Maribor | 123 | (16) |
| 2017 | → Veržej (loan) | 11 | (3) |
| 2021–2022 | East Bengal | 8 | (2) |
| 2023–2024 | Krka | 19 | (0) |
| 2025– | ATUS Ferlach | 1 | (1) |

International career
| 2010 | Slovenia U19 | 3 | (0) |
| 2013–2014 | Slovenia U21 | 8 | (0) |
| 2018 | Slovenia | 6 | (0) |
| 2019 | Slovenia B | 1 | (0) |
- * Club domestic league appearances and goals as of 23 March 2025

Amir Dervišević (born 4 July 1992) is a Slovenian footballer who plays as a midfielder for Austrian club ATUS Ferlach.

== Club career ==
On 11 September 2021, Dervišević moved abroad for the first time in his career and signed with Indian Super League side SC East Bengal. After making eight league appearances and scoring two goals, he left the club on 25 January 2022.

== International career ==
Dervišević made his debut for Slovenia in a June 2018 friendly match away against Montenegro, coming on as a second-half substitute for Jasmin Kurtić.

== Career statistics ==
=== Club ===
As of 23 December 2021

Appearances and goals by club, season and competition
| Club | Season | League | | | National cup | | Continental | | Other | | Total | |
| Club | Season | Division | Apps | Goals | Apps | Goals | Apps | Goals | Apps | Goals | Apps | Goals |
|---|---|---|---|---|---|---|---|---|---|---|---|---|
| Interblock | 2010–11 | Slovenian Second League | 2 | 0 | 0 | 0 | — | | — | | 2 | 0 |
| Interblock | 2011–12 | Slovenian Second League | 4 | 0 | 2 | 0 | — | | — | | 6 | 0 |
| Interblock | Total | | 6 | 0 | 2 | 0 | 0 | 0 | 0 | 0 | 8 | 0 |
| Krka | 2012–13 | Slovenian Second League | 23 | 10 | 0 | 0 | — | | — | | 23 | 10 |
| Maribor | 2013–14 | Slovenian PrvaLiga | 16 | 1 | 5 | 0 | 7 (Note: Five appearances in UEFA Europa League, two appearances in UEFA Champions League) | 0 | 0 | 0 | 28 | 1 |
| Maribor | 2014–15 | Slovenian PrvaLiga | 16 | 1 | 3 | 0 | 6 (Note: Appearance(s) in UEFA Champions League) | 0 | 1 (Note: Appearance(s) in Slovenian Supercup) | 0 | 26 | 1 |
| Maribor | 2015–16 | Slovenian PrvaLiga | 9 | 2 | 3 | 1 | 0 | 0 | 0 | 0 | 12 | 3 |
| Maribor | 2017–18 | Slovenian PrvaLiga | 15 | 2 | 0 | 0 | 0 | 0 | — | | 15 | 2 |
| Maribor | 2018–19 | Slovenian PrvaLiga | 32 | 4 | 4 | 0 | 6 (Note: Appearance(s) in UEFA Europa League) | 1 | — | | 42 | 5 |
| Maribor | 2019–20 | Slovenian PrvaLiga | 20 | 6 | 0 | 0 | 0 | 0 | — | | 20 | 6 |
| Maribor | 2020–21 | Slovenian PrvaLiga | 15 | 0 | 2 | 0 | 1 | 0 | — | | 18 | 0 |
| Maribor | Total | | 123 | 16 | 17 | 1 | 20 | 1 | 1 | 0 | 161 | 18 |
| Veržej (loan) | 2016–17 | Slovenian Second League | 11 | 3 | 0 | 0 | — | | — | | 11 | 3 |
| East Bengal | 2021–22 | Indian Super League | 8 | 2 | — | | — | | — | | 8 | 2 |
| Career total | | | 171 | 31 | 19 | 1 | 20 | 1 | 1 | 0 | 211 | 33 |

=== International ===
As of match played 19 November 2018

Appearances and goals by national team and year
| National team | Year | Apps | Goals |
|---|---|---|---|
| Slovenia | 2018 | 6 | 0 |
| Total | | 6 | 0 |

== Honours ==
Maribor

- Slovenian PrvaLiga: 2013–14, 2014–15, 2018–19
- Slovenian Cup: 2015–16
- Slovenian Supercup: 2013, 2014
