= Marko Šuler =

Slovenian footballer (born 1983)

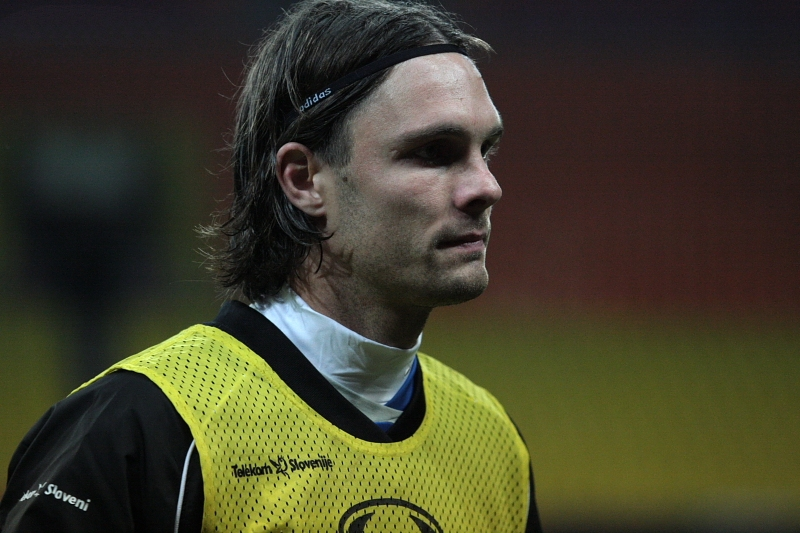
- Šuler with Slovenia in 2009

Personal information
- Date of birth: 9 March 1983 (age 43)
- Place of birth: Slovenj Gradec, SR Slovenia, SFR Yugoslavia
- Height: 1.86 m (6 ft 1 in)
- Position: Defender

Youth career
- Slovenj Gradec
- SAK Klagenfurt
- Kärnten
- Dravograd

Senior career*
Years	Team	Apps	(Gls)
2002–2004	Dravograd	48	(0)
2002–2003	→ Fužinar (loan)	10	(0)
2004–2008	Gorica	107	(7)
2008–2012	Gent	106	(4)
2012	→ Hapoel Tel Aviv (loan)	15	(0)
2012–2013	Legia Warsaw	7	(0)
2013	Legia Warsaw II	14	(1)
2014–2019	Maribor	127	(8)
Total		434	(20)

International career
2000–2001	Slovenia U17	7	(1)
2001	Slovenia U18	4	(0)
2002–2003	Slovenia U20	4	(0)
2003–2005	Slovenia U21	17	(0)
2006	Slovenia B	1	(0)
2008–2013	Slovenia	39	(3)
- * Club domestic league appearances and goals

Marko Šuler (Slovene pronunciation: [ˈmarko ˈʃulər]; born 9 March 1983) is a Slovenian former professional footballer who played as a centre-back. Besides Slovenia, he has played in Belgium, Israel, and Poland.

== International career ==
Šuler earned his first cap for Slovenia in a friendly match against Hungary on 26 March 2008. He scored his first goal on 20 August 2008 in a friendly against Croatia. Šuler earned a total of 39 caps, scoring 3 goals.

== Career statistics ==
=== International ===
Scores and results list Slovenia's goal tally first, score column indicates score after each Šuler goal.

List of international goals scored by Marko Šuler
No.	Date	Venue	Opponent	Score	Result	Competition
1	20 August 2008	Ljudski vrt, Maribor, Slovenia	Croatia	1–0	2–3	Friendly
2	14 October 2009	Stadio Olimpico, San Marino, San Marino	San Marino	3–0	3–0	2010 FIFA World Cup qualification
3	11 September 2012	Ullevaal Stadion, Oslo, Norway	Norway	1–0	1–2	2014 FIFA World Cup qualification

== Honours ==
Dravograd

- Slovenian Second League: 2001–02

Gorica

- Slovenian First League: 2004–05, 2005–06

Gent

- Belgian Cup: 2009–10

Hapoel Tel Aviv

- Israel State Cup: 2011–12

Legia Warsaw

- Ekstraklasa: 2012–13
- Polish Cup: 2012–13

Maribor

- Slovenian First League: 2013–14, 2014–15, 2016–17, 2018–19
- Slovenian Cup: 2015–16
- Slovenian Supercup: 2014
