= Petar Stojanović (footballer) =

Slovenian footballer (born 1995)

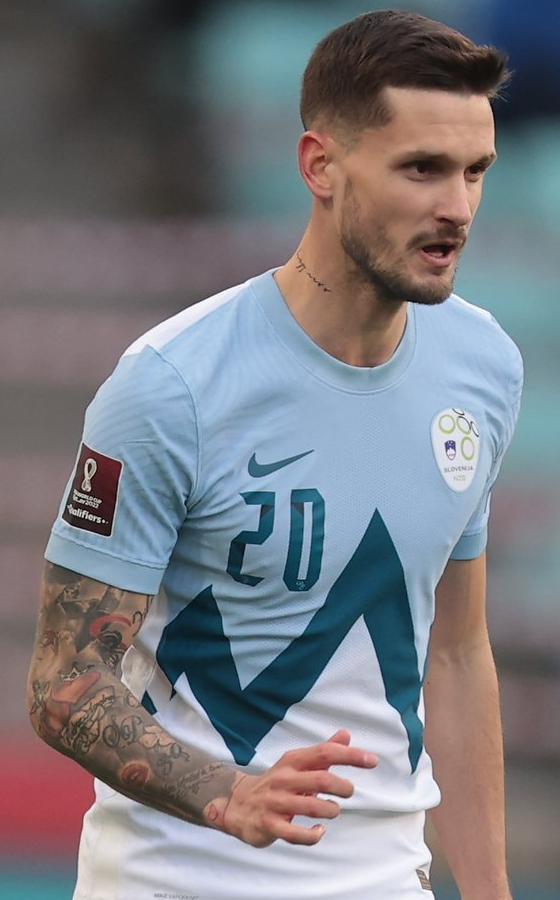
- Stojanović with Slovenia in 2021

Personal information
- Date of birth: 7 October 1995 (age 31)
- Place of birth: Ljubljana, Slovenia
- Height: 1.78 m (5 ft 10 in)
- Position: Right-back

Team information
- Current team: Maribor (on loan from Legia Warsaw)
- Number: 30

Youth career
- 2001–2007: Arne Tabor
- 2007–2010: Slovan
- 2010–2011: Interblock
- 2011–2013: Maribor

Senior career*
Years	Team	Apps	(Gls)
2012–2016	Maribor	45	(2)
2013–2014	→ Veržej (loan)	11	(3)
2016–2022	Dinamo Zagreb	121	(2)
2016	Dinamo Zagreb II	1	(0)
2021–2022	→ Empoli (loan)	33	(1)
2022–2025	Empoli	28	(0)
2023–2024	→ Sampdoria (loan)	28	(1)
2024–2025	→ Salernitana (loan)	28	(0)
2025–	Legia Warsaw	14	(1)
2026–	→ Maribor (loan)	1	(0)

International career^{‡}
2010	Slovenia U16	2	(0)
2011–2012	Slovenia U17	15	(2)
2012–2013	Slovenia U18	14	(2)
2013	Slovenia U19	4	(0)
2014–2016	Slovenia U21	6	(1)
2014–	Slovenia	73	(2)
- * Club domestic league appearances and goals as of 16:15, 22 November 2026 (UTC) ‡ National team caps and goals as of 10:49, 29 March 2026 (UTC)

Petar Stojanović (born 7 October 1995) is a Slovenian professional footballer who plays as a right-back for Slovenian PrvaLiga club Maribor, on loan from Ekstraklasa club Legia Warsaw, and for the Slovenia national team.

== Club career ==
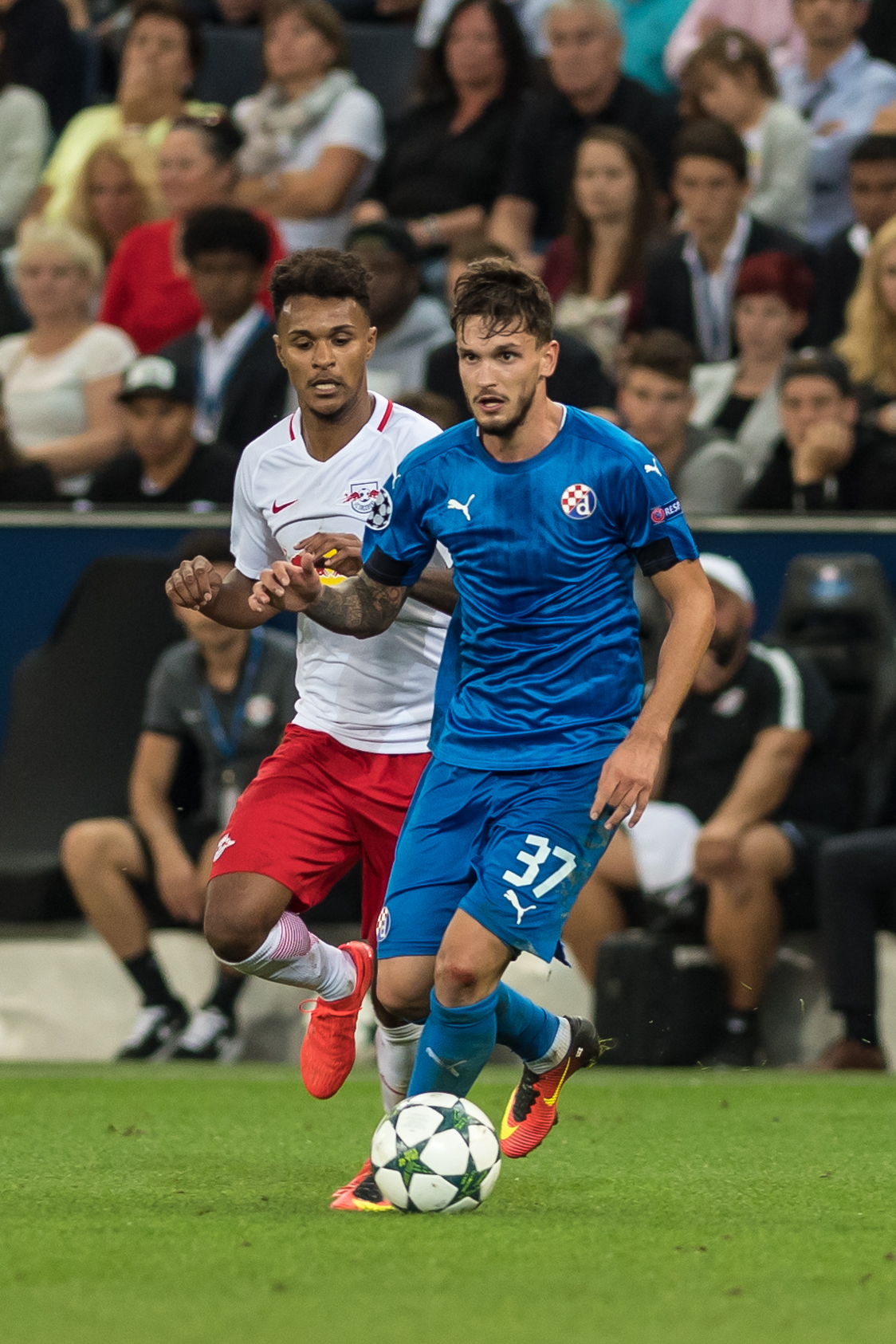
Stojanović (right) with Dinamo Zagreb in 2016

Stojanović started playing football at the local football club Arne Tabor, before joining Slovan and later Interblock youth selections, where he remained until 2011, when he was acquired by Maribor. After his transfer to Maribor, Joc Pečečnik, the owner of Interblock, accused Zlatko Zahovič, the director of football at Maribor, of going behind his back and stealing one of the biggest Slovenian talents of his age.

Stojanović initially played as a goalkeeper, but later switched to the position of offensive midfielder. When he transferred to Maribor youth selections he was regarded as one of the most promising young midfielders in the country, however, Maribor's coaches and staff saw a much bigger potential for Stojanović on the position of right-back. During his first year in Maribor he mostly played for the under-17 team. However, he got his chance to play for the main squad in the second part of the 2011–12 season and made his first appearance in the Slovenian top division, 1. SNL, on 25 March 2012. At the time of his debut, he was 16 years, five months and 18 days old and set a new club record as the youngest player to appear in the top division.

On 5 January 2016, he signed a five-year contract with Dinamo Zagreb, reportedly for a transfer fee of around €2 million plus add-ons.

On 20 July 2021, Stojanović joined Italian club Empoli on loan, with a conditional obligation to buy. The conditions were fulfilled and Empoli purchased the rights on 17 June 2022.

On 30 August 2024, Stojanović joined Salernitana in Serie B on a season-long loan. After the 2024–25 season and the expiration of his contract with Empoli, he left Italy and joined Polish Ekstraklasa club Legia Warsaw on 27 June 2025, signing a three-year contract. In his debut season, he failed to establish himself in the first team, as Legia struggled throughout the season and even faced relegation at one point. After the season, he injured his tendon while training with the Slovenia national team and had to undergo surgery. In September 2026, while still recovering from surgery, Stojanović went on a season-long loan to Maribor, returning to his first professional club after ten years.

== International career ==
Stojanović represented Slovenia at all youth international levels from under-16 to under-21.

As a member of the Slovenia under-17 team, Stojanović appeared at the 2012 UEFA European Under-17 Championship, where he scored one goal. He debuted for the senior squad against Colombia on 18 November 2014. At the time, he was 19 years, one month and 11 days old and became the youngest debutant in the national team, surpassing the previous record set by Rene Mihelič seven years earlier.

On 1 September 2021, he scored his first goal for the national team in the 2022 FIFA World Cup qualifying match against Slovakia, which ended in a 1–1 draw.

Stojanović was named by head coach Matjaž Kek in Slovenia's 26-man squad for UEFA Euro 2024.

== Career statistics ==
=== Club ===
As of match played 1 February 2026

Appearances and goals by club, season and competition
Club	Season	League			National cup (Note: Includes Slovenian Cup, Croatian Cup, Coppa Italia, Polish Cup)		Continental		Other		Total	
Club	Season	Division	Apps	Goals	Apps	Goals	Apps	Goals	Apps	Goals	Apps	Goals
Maribor	2011–12	Slovenian PrvaLiga	2	0	0	0	0	0	0	0	2	0
Maribor	2012–13	Slovenian PrvaLiga	2	0	0	0	0	0	0	0	2	0
Maribor	2013–14	Slovenian PrvaLiga	7	1	3	1	0	0	0	0	10	2
Maribor	2014–15	Slovenian PrvaLiga	23	0	1	0	11 (Note: Appearances in UEFA Champions League)	0	1 (Note: Appearances in Slovenian Supercup)	0	36	0
Maribor	2015–16	Slovenian PrvaLiga	11	1	2	0	2	0	1	0	16	1
Maribor	Total		45	2	6	1	13	0	2	0	66	3
Veržej (loan)	2013–14	Slovenian Second League	11	3	0	0	—		—		11	3
Dinamo Zagreb	2015–16	Croatian First League	10	0	0	0	—		—		10	0
Dinamo Zagreb	2016–17	Croatian First League	23	1	3	0	10	0	—		36	1
Dinamo Zagreb	2017–18	Croatian First League	30	0	4	0	4 (Note: Appearances in UEFA Europa League)	0	—		38	0
Dinamo Zagreb	2018–19	Croatian First League	18	0	3	0	15 (Note: Six appearances in UEFA Champions League, nine appearances in UEFA Europa League)	0	—		36	0
Dinamo Zagreb	2019–20	Croatian First League	17	1	3	0	10	0	1 (Note: Appearance in Croatian Super Cup)	0	31	1
Dinamo Zagreb	2020–21	Croatian First League	23	0	4	0	7 (Note: Two appearances in UEFA Champions League, five appearances in UEFA Europa League)	0	—		34	0
Dinamo Zagreb	2021–22	Croatian First League	0	0	0	0	2	0	—		2	0
Dinamo Zagreb	Total		121	2	17	0	48	0	1	0	187	2
Empoli (loan)	2021–22	Serie A	33	1	2	0	—		—		35	1
Empoli	2022–23	Serie A	27	0	1	0	—		—		28	0
Empoli	2023–24	Serie A	0	0	1	0	—		—		1	0
Empoli	2024–25	Serie A	1	0	1	0	—		—		2	0
Empoli	Total		28	0	3	0	—		—		31	0
Sampdoria (loan)	2023–24	Serie B	28	1	0	0	—		1 (Note: Appearance in Serie B promotion play-offs)	0	29	1
Salernitana (loan)	2024–25	Serie B	28	0	0	0	—		1 (Note: Appearance in Serie B relegation play-outs)	0	29	0
Legia Warsaw	2025–26	Ekstraklasa	14	1	1	0	10 (Note: Three appearances in UEFA Europa League, seven appearances in UEFA Conference League)	0	1 (Note: Appearance in Polish Super Cup)	0	26	1
Career total			308	10	29	1	71	0	6	0	414	11

=== International ===
As of match played 28 March 2026

Appearances and goals by national team and year
National team	Year	Apps	Goals
Slovenia	2014	1	0
Slovenia	2015	2	0
Slovenia	2016	1	0
Slovenia	2017	0	0
Slovenia	2018	2	0
Slovenia	2019	10	0
Slovenia	2020	6	0
Slovenia	2021	10	1
Slovenia	2022	9	1
Slovenia	2023	9	0
Slovenia	2024	13	0
Slovenia	2025	9	0
Slovenia	2026	1	0
Total		73	2

Scores and results list Slovenia's goal tally first, score column indicates score after each Stojanović goal.

List of international goals scored by Petar Stojanović
No.	Date	Venue	Opponent	Score	Result	Competition
1	1 September 2021	Stožice Stadium, Ljubljana, Slovenia	Slovakia	1–1	1–1	2022 FIFA World Cup qualification
2	5 June 2022	Rajko Mitić Stadium, Belgrade, Serbia	Serbia	1–1	1–4	2022–23 UEFA Nations League B

== Honours ==
Maribor

- Slovenian PrvaLiga: 2011–12, 2012–13, 2013–14, 2014–15
- Slovenian Cup: 2011–12, 2012–13
- Slovenian Supercup: 2012, 2014

Dinamo Zagreb

- Prva HNL: 2015–16, 2017–18, 2018–19, 2019–20, 2020–21
- Croatian Cup: 2015–16, 2017–18, 2020–21
- Croatian Supercup: 2019

Legia Warsaw

- Polish Super Cup: 2025
