= Luka Zahović =

Slovenian footballer (born 1995)

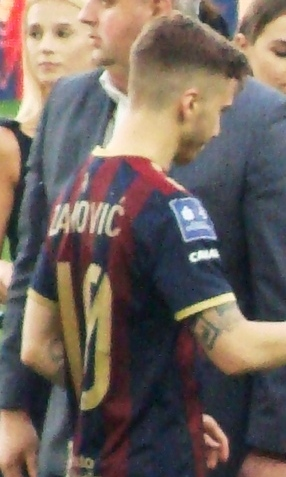
- Zahović with Pogoń Szczecin in 2021

Personal information
- Date of birth: 15 November 1995 (age 31)
- Place of birth: Guimarães, Portugal
- Height: 1.77 m (5 ft 10 in)
- Position: Forward

Team information
- Current team: Maribor
- Number: 79

Youth career
- Valencia
- 2001–2007: Benfica
- 2007–2013: Maribor
- 2008–2009: → Pobrežje (loan)

Senior career*
Years	Team	Apps	(Gls)
2013–2015	Maribor	45	(13)
2013–2014	→ Veržej (loan)	10	(3)
2014	Maribor B	1	(3)
2015–2017	Heerenveen	6	(0)
2016–2017	→ Maribor (loan)	28	(15)
2017–2020	Maribor	86	(46)
2020–2024	Pogoń Szczecin	106	(20)
2024–2026	Górnik Zabrze	38	(9)
2026	CFR Cluj	14	(1)
2026–	Maribor	15	(4)

International career
2012	Slovenia U17 (Note: Only appearances in official competitive UEFA matches are listed.)	3	(1)
2013	Slovenia U19	3	(3)
2015–2016	Slovenia U21	10	(3)
2018–2023	Slovenia	15	(0)
2019	Slovenia B	1	(1)
- * Club domestic league appearances and goals as of 22 November 2026

Luka Zahović (born 15 November 1995) is a professional footballer who plays as a forward for Slovenian PrvaLiga club Maribor. Born in Portugal, he represented the Slovenia national team internationally.

== Club career ==
=== Early career ===
Born in Guimarães, Portugal, Zahović began his career at Spanish club Valencia before moving to Portuguese club Benfica. When Zahović was twelve years old, his family returned to Slovenia, and he joined Maribor's youth selections in the 2007–08 season after his father Zlatko became a new director of football at the club.

=== Maribor ===
He made his professional debut in the final round of the 2012–13 season during a match against Aluminij when he came on as a late substitute. In the following year he spent part of the season playing on loan at the Slovenian Second League squad Veržej, scoring three goals in ten matches, until being given more opportunities by Maribor's coach Ante Šimundža during the second part of the season, eventually making 11 appearances during the 2013–14 PrvaLiga season.

The 2014–15 was his breakthrough season. He made his PrvaLiga season debut in the second round when he came on as a late substitute in the 78th minute during a match against Radomlje. Maribor was struggling at home against the PrvaLiga newcomers with the score being 1–1 and less than ten minutes of regulation left. However, after only spending seven minutes on the pitch Zahović scored his first official goal for The Violets. He increased the lead three minutes later, securing all three points for the home side. He scored his third goal of the season in late August against Zavrč and continued his good form in early September when he netted a hat-trick for Maribor B in a match against Šentjur in the Slovenian Third League. A week later, in his fifth PrvaLiga appearance of the season, he scored another double in a match against Krka, becoming the league's top goalscorer with five goals after eight rounds.

Only four days later, on 17 September 2014, in Maribor's first match of the 2014–15 UEFA Champions League group stage at home against Sporting CP, Zahović made his debut in UEFA competitions when he came on as a substitute for Dare Vršič after Nani had put Sporting ahead in the 80th minute. He then equalised in the 92nd minute. This was only the second time, first time among Europeans, since 1992 when the UEFA Champions League was established in its current format, that a father and son have both scored in the competition. His father Zlatko has scored a total of 11 goals in 32 UEFA Champions League appearances during his career. For his performances Zahović was nominated for the 2014 Golden Boy Award. He finished the 2014–15 season in second place among the club goalscorers with 15 goals in all competitions, 12 of which he has scored in the PrvaLiga.

=== Heerenveen ===
In August 2015, Zahović moved to the Eredivisie club Heerenveen and signed a three-year deal with the Dutch squad, with the possibility of a two-year extension. The transfer fee paid by Heerenveen was undisclosed, but it is believed to have been around €700,000. Zahović made eight appearances for the club in all competitions in the 2015–16 season.

=== Loan and return to Maribor ===
On 24 August 2016, Heerenveen loaned Zahović to Maribor. On 27 February 2017, it was reported that Zahović would not return to Heerenveen and would continue his career at Maribor. On 23 May 2017, he extended his contract with Maribor until 2020. On the same day, he was proclaimed as the best young footballer of the 2016–17 Slovenian PrvaLiga season. In the next season, Zahović became the top goalscorer of the PrvaLiga with 18 goals; all of them were scored in the second part of the season.

=== Pogoń Szczecin ===
On 1 October 2020, Zahović joined Ekstraklasa club Pogoń Szczecin, signing a three-year contract.

=== Górnik Zabrze ===
On 27 June 2024, Zahović joined fellow Ekstraklasa side Górnik Zabrze on a free transfer, signing a two-year contract.

== International career ==
Zahović was eligible to represent Portugal and Slovenia at the international level. In 2014, he claimed that he would probably choose Portugal over Slovenia if he received a call-up from both teams.

=== Youth level ===
Zahović made his youth international debut for Slovenia in June 2010, when he played for the under-16 team in a friendly match against Slovakia. He represented the under-17 team at the 2012 UEFA European Under-17 Championship, where he played in all three group stage matches. Zahović also scored the only goal for Slovenia in a 3–1 defeat against the Netherlands, who later won the competition. He debuted for the under-21 team on 2 June 2015 in a friendly match against Greece, where he scored Slovenia's first goal in an eventual 3–0 victory. Zahović was capped eight times for the team during the 2017 UEFA European Under-21 Championship qualifiers, and also scored one goal against Andorra in the first round.

=== Senior team ===
On 23 May 2018, Zahović was included in the senior squad for a friendly match against Montenegro. He made his debut on 16 October 2018 in a game against Cyprus.

== Personal life ==
Zahović was born in the Portuguese city of Guimarães where his father Zlatko, a former professional footballer and the all-time top goalscorer of the Slovenia national team, was at the time playing for Vitória Guimarães. He holds both Portuguese and Slovenian citizenship.

Zahović and Maja Žnuderl have a son named Filip (born 2019).

== Career statistics ==
=== Club ===
As of match played 18 July 2026

Appearances and goals by club, season and competition
Club	Season	League			National cup (Note: Includes Slovenian Cup, KNVB Cup, Polish Cup, Cupa României)		Europe		Other		Total	
Club	Season	Division	Apps	Goals	Apps	Goals	Apps	Goals	Apps	Goals	Apps	Goals
Maribor	2012–13	PrvaLiga	1	0	0	0	—		—		1	0
Maribor	2013–14	PrvaLiga	11	0	2	1	1 (Note: Appearance(s) in UEFA Europa League)	0	—		14	1
Maribor	2014–15	PrvaLiga	30	12	3	2	5 (Note: Appearance(s) in UEFA Champions League)	1	1 (Note: Appearance(s) in Slovenian Supercup)	0	39	15
Maribor	2015–16	PrvaLiga	3	1	0	0	1	0	1	0	5	1
Maribor	Total		45	13	5	3	7	1	2	0	59	17
Veržej (loan)	2013–14	2. SNL	10	3	0	0	—		—		10	3
Heerenveen	2015–16	Eredivisie	6	0	2	0	—		—		8	0
Maribor (loan)	2016–17	PrvaLiga	28	15	5	1	—		—		33	16
Maribor	2017–18	PrvaLiga	25	18	0	0	5	1	—		30	19
Maribor	2018–19	PrvaLiga	32	18	5	0	6	1	—		43	19
Maribor	2019–20	PrvaLiga	28	10	1	0	3 (Note: One appearance in UEFA Champions League, two appearances in UEFA Europa League)	0	—		32	10
Maribor	2020–21	PrvaLiga	1	0	0	0			—		1	0
Maribor	Total		114	61	11	1	14	2	0	0	139	64
Pogoń Szczecin	2020–21	Ekstraklasa	25	2	2	1	—		—		27	3
Pogoń Szczecin	2021–22	Ekstraklasa	30	11	1	0	2 (Note: Appearance(s) in UEFA Europa Conference League)	0	—		33	11
Pogoń Szczecin	2022–23	Ekstraklasa	32	6	2	3	4	2	—		38	11
Pogoń Szczecin	2023–24	Ekstraklasa	19	1	2	0	4	0	—		25	1
Pogoń Szczecin	Total		106	20	7	4	10	2	0	0	123	26
Górnik Zabrze	2024–25	Ekstraklasa	32	8	1	0	—		—		33	8
Górnik Zabrze	2025–26	Ekstraklasa	6	1	2	1	—		—		8	2
Górnik Zabrze	Total		38	9	3	1	—		—		41	10
CFR Cluj	2025–26	Liga I	13	1	1	0	—		—		14	1
CFR Cluj	2026–27	Liga I	1	0	—		—		—		1	0
CFR Cluj	Total		14	1	1	0	0	0	—		15	1
Career total			333	107	29	9	31	5	2	0	395	121

=== International ===
Appearances and goals by national team and year
National team	Year	Apps	Goals
Slovenia
Slovenia	2018	1	0
Slovenia	2019	2	0
Slovenia	2021	6	0
Slovenia	2022	5	0
Slovenia	2023	1	0
Total		15	0

== Honours ==
Maribor

- Slovenian PrvaLiga: 2012–13, 2013–14, 2014–15, 2016–17, 2018–19
- Slovenian Cup: 2012–13
- Slovenian Supercup: 2014

Pogoń Szczecin

- Polish Cup runner-up: 2023–24

Individual

- Slovenian PrvaLiga top scorer: 2017–18, 2018–19
- Slovenian PrvaLiga Young player of the Year: 2016–17, 2017–18
