= Agim Ibraimi =

Macedonian footballer (born 1988)

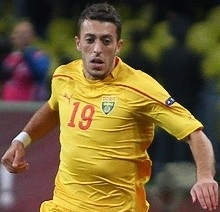
- Ibraimi playing for Macedonia in 2011

Personal information
- Date of birth: 29 August 1988 (age 38)
- Place of birth: Tetovo, SR Macedonia, Yugoslavia
- Height: 1.78 m (5 ft 10 in)
- Position: Winger

Youth career
- –2005: Shkëndija
- 2006–2008: Red Bull Salzburg

Senior career*
| Years | Team | Apps | (Gls) |
| 2005–2006 | Shkëndija | 49 | (3) |
| 2006–2008 | Red Bull Salzburg | 3 | (0) |
| 2008–2010 | Olimpija Ljubljana | 47 | (19) |
| 2010–2011 | Eskişehirspor | 1 | (0) |
| 2011 | Nafta Lendava | 17 | (0) |
| 2011–2016 | Maribor | 107 | (29) |
| 2013–2014 | → Cagliari (loan) | 25 | (2) |
| 2016–2017 | Astana | 6 | (0) |
| 2017–2018 | Domžale | 36 | (6) |
| 2019–2020 | Shkëndija | 36 | (7) |
| 2020–2021 | Kukësi | 35 | (15) |
| 2021–2022 | Dinamo Tirana | 36 | (8) |
| Total | | 388 | (89) |

International career
| 2004 | Macedonia U17 | 3 | (2) |
| 2005–2006 | Macedonia U19 | 8 | (1) |
| 2007–2009 | Macedonia U21 | 11 | (2) |
| 2009–2021 | North Macedonia | 40 | (7) |
- * Club domestic league appearances and goals

Agim Ibraimi (Macedonian: Агим Ибраими; born 29 August 1988) is a retired Macedonian professional footballer who played as a midfielder.

== Club career ==
=== Childhood and early career ===
Ibraimi was born in Tetovo, SR Macedonia, to Albanian parents. While growing up in Tetovo, Agim joined the Shkendija youth team and eventually broke through into the senior squad at the age of 17.

=== Shkendija and Red Bull Salzburg ===
Ibraimi debuted for Shkendija in 2005 and was a crucial member of the team. He made forty nine appearances and scored three goals, helping Shkendija reach fifth place in the Prva Liga. Making a significant impact on the club at such a young age, Agim was picked up by Red Bull Salzburg and moved abroad.

At Red Bull Salzburg, Ibraimi developed further under their tutelage. In two years at Salzburg, Ibraimi made three appearances for the senior team.

=== Olimpija ===
Ibraimi joined Olimpija who were at that time playing in the Slovenian Second League. His first season in the Slovenian capital was very successful, as Olimpija finished as league winners with Ibraimi scoring eleven goals.

The start of his second season in Ljubljana was not as smooth. After Miran Pavlin, the director of football who brought him to the club, departed for Koper, Ibraimi wanted to join him. But Olimpija's board had none of it, as the player still had a valid contract with the club. The start of his first season in Slovenian PrvaLiga was difficult, his form was not up to standard, but it did pick up eventually and Ibraimi regained his place in Olimpija's first eleven. He scored his first goal in the Slovenian PrvaLiga on 28 August against Koper.

=== Eskisehirspor ===
Ibraimi terminated his contract with Olimpija in the summer of 2010 and signed a three-year deal with Turkish team Eskişehirspor on 3 September 2010. He made his debut for Eskisehirspor on 25 September 2010 when he came off the bench in the 77th minute, but his team lost 1–0. Ibraimi failed to adjust to the Turkish league so he and the club agreed to mutually terminate the contract and Ibraimi joined Nafta Lendava during the 2011 January transfer window.

=== Maribor ===
On 10 June 2011, it was announced that Ibraimi has signed a three-year contract with the Slovenian club Maribor. He made his debut for Maribor against Dudelange in the qualifying rounds of the UEFA Champions League where he also scored his first goal for the club. Despite not qualifying past the third round of qualifications, Maribor had a chance in the play-offs for the UEFA Europa League against Rangers. Ibraimi helped Maribor reach the group stages of the Europa League after scoring a goal from just inside the box in the first leg. Despite Maribor finished in last place in their group, Ibraimi scored against Braga in the only match of the group stage where Maribor secured a point. In May 2012, Ibraimi signed a new contract with the club until May 2015. In the same month, he scored directly from a corner kick in an 8–0 win against Triglav Kranj and won the league title with Maribor. In December 2012, he won the Macedonian Footballer of the Year award. He was voted as one of the best midfield players in the 2012–13 Slovenian PrvaLiga alongside his teammate Goran Cvijanović and Nik Omladič. He was also selected as the overall best player in the 2012–13 PrvaLiga season.

=== Cagliari ===
On 31 August 2013, Ibraimi was loaned to Cagliari. On 2 March 2014, he scored his first goal for Cagliari against Udinese in a 3–0 win.

=== Return to Maribor ===
Returning to Maribor, Ibraimi helped the club reach the UEFA Champions League group stage by scoring three goals in the qualifying rounds against Zrinjski Mostar and Maccabi Tel Aviv. On 5 November 2014, Maribor drew 1–1 against Chelsea in the Champions League, with Ibraimi scoring in the 50th minute with a curling shot from the edge of the box. In August 2014, he extended his contract with the club until 2017.

=== Astana ===
On 15 June 2016, Ibraimi signed a two-and-a-half-year contract with Kazakhstan Premier League side FC Astana. After an injury he ended his contract in the end of April 2017 and became a free agent.

=== Dinamo Tirana ===
In July 2021, Ibraimi joined the newly promoted side Dinamo Tirana, signing a contract for the 2021–22 Kategoria Superiore season. After a difficult season, in which he scored 8 goals in 36 league appearances, which weren't enough to keep the team in the top flight, Ibrahimi announced his departure and became a free agent.

== International career ==
Ibraimi was capped for the Macedonian under-21 team during the qualifying campaign for the 2011 UEFA European Under-21 Championship.

He received his first call-up to the Macedonian senior team for a friendly match against Spain, which took place on 12 August 2009. In the match, he came on as a substitute for Goran Pandev in the 81st minute of the game. On 12 October 2012, Ibraimi scored his first goal for Macedonia in a 2–1 home defeat against Croatia in the 2014 FIFA World Cup qualifications. He scored another goal just three days later against Serbia in a 1–0 win. In total, he made 40 appearances for the team, and also scored 7 goals.

== Personal life ==
Ibraimi is multilingual, speaking six languages fluently: Albanian, English, German, Macedonian, Serbo-Croatian and Slovenian. He is a cousin of professional football player Arijan Ademi. In February 2016, after having spent years of playing in the country, Ibraimi acquired Slovenian citizenship.

== Career statistics ==
=== Club ===
Appearances and goals by club, season and competition
| Club | Season | League | | | National cup | | Continental | | Other | | Total | |
| Club | Season | Division | Apps | Goals | Apps | Goals | Apps | Goals | Apps | Goals | Apps | Goals |
|---|---|---|---|---|---|---|---|---|---|---|---|---|
| Shkëndija | 2004–05 | 1. MFL | 3 | 1 | | | — | | — | | 3 | 1 |
| Shkëndija | 2005–06 | 1. MFL | 26 | 2 | | | — | | — | | 26 | 2 |
| Shkëndija | 2006–07 | 1. MFL | 20 | 0 | | | — | | — | | 20 | 0 |
| Shkëndija | Total | | 49 | 3 | | | — | | — | | 49 | 3 |
| Red Bull Salzburg | 2007–08 | Austrian Bundesliga | 3 | 0 | | | — | | — | | 3 | 0 |
| Olimpija Ljubljana | 2008–09 | 2. SNL | 19 | 11 | 1 | 1 | — | | — | | 20 | 12 |
| Olimpija Ljubljana | 2009–10 | 1. SNL | 28 | 8 | 2 | 2 | — | | — | | 30 | 10 |
| Olimpija Ljubljana | Total | | 47 | 19 | 3 | 3 | — | | — | | 50 | 22 |
| Eskişehirspor | 2010–11 | Süper Lig | 1 | 0 | 1 | 0 | — | | — | | 2 | 0 |
| Nafta Lendava | 2010–11 | 1. SNL | 17 | 0 | 0 | 0 | — | | — | | 17 | 0 |
| Maribor | 2011–12 | 1. SNL | 27 | 9 | 4 | 1 | 11 (Note: Three appearances and one goal in UEFA Champions League, eight appearances and two goals in UEFA Europa League) | 3 | 1 (Note: Appearance in Slovenian Supercup) | 1 | 43 | 14 |
| Maribor | 2012–13 | 1. SNL | 25 | 6 | 6 | 1 | 12 (Note: Six appearances and one goal in UEFA Champions League, six appearances and one goal in UEFA Europa League) | 2 | 1 | 1 | 44 | 10 |
| Maribor | 2013–14 | 1. SNL | 4 | 2 | 0 | 0 | 6 (Note: Appearances in UEFA Champions League) | 0 | 1 | 0 | 11 | 2 |
| Maribor | 2014–15 | 1. SNL | 24 | 2 | 3 | 0 | 12 | 4 | 0 | 0 | 39 | 6 |
| Maribor | 2015–16 | 1. SNL | 27 | 10 | 1 | 0 | 2 | 0 | 1 | 0 | 31 | 10 |
| Maribor | Total | | 107 | 29 | 14 | 2 | 43 | 9 | 4 | 2 | 168 | 42 |
| Cagliari (loan) | 2013–14 | Serie A | 25 | 2 | 0 | 0 | — | | — | | 25 | 2 |
| Astana | 2016 | Kazakhstan Premier League | 6 | 0 | 0 | 0 | 5 (Note: Four appearances and one goal in UEFA Champions League, one appearance in UEFA Europa League) | 1 | — | | 11 | 1 |
| Domžale | 2017–18 | 1. SNL | 20 | 4 | 0 | 0 | — | | — | | 20 | 4 |
| Domžale | 2018–19 | 1. SNL | 16 | 2 | 3 | 0 | 4 (Note: Appearances in UEFA Europa League) | 0 | — | | 23 | 2 |
| Domžale | Total | | 36 | 6 | 3 | 0 | 4 | 0 | — | | 43 | 6 |
| Shkëndija | 2018–19 | 1. MFL | 15 | 3 | 0 | 0 | — | | — | | 15 | 3 |
| Shkëndija | 2019–20 | 1. MFL | 21 | 4 | 1 | 0 | 4 (Note: Two appearances and two goals in UEFA Champions League, two appearances and two goals in UEFA Europa League) | 4 | — | | 26 | 8 |
| Shkëndija | Total | | 36 | 7 | 1 | 0 | 4 | 4 | — | | 41 | 11 |
| Kukësi | 2020–21 | Kategoria Superiore | 35 | 15 | 3 | 2 | — | | — | | 38 | 17 |
| Career total | | | 362 | 81 | 25 | 7 | 56 | 14 | 4 | 2 | 447 | 104 |

=== International ===
Appearances and goals by national team and year
| National team | Year | Apps | Goals |
|---|---|---|---|
| North Macedonia | 2009 | 1 | 0 |
| North Macedonia | 2010 | 3 | 0 |
| North Macedonia | 2011 | 3 | 0 |
| North Macedonia | 2012 | 9 | 3 |
| North Macedonia | 2013 | 8 | 2 |
| North Macedonia | 2014 | 5 | 2 |
| North Macedonia | 2015 | 8 | 0 |
| North Macedonia | 2016 | 2 | 0 |
| North Macedonia | 2021 | 1 | 0 |
| Total | | 40 | 7 |

Scores and results list North Macedonia's goal tally first, score column indicates score after each Ibraimi goal.

List of international goals scored by Agim Ibraimi
| No. | Date | Venue | Opponent | Score | Result | Competition |
|---|---|---|---|---|---|---|
| 1 | 12 October 2012 | Philip II Arena, Skopje, Macedonia | Croatia | 1–0 | 1–2 | 2014 World Cup qualifier |
| 2 | 16 October 2012 | Philip II Arena, Skopje, Macedonia | Serbia | 1–0 | 1–0 | 2014 World Cup qualifier |
| 3 | 14 November 2012 | Philip II Arena, Skopje, Macedonia | Slovenia | 3–1 | 3–2 | Friendly |
| 4 | 6 February 2013 | Philip II Arena, Skopje, Macedonia | Denmark | 2–0 | 3–0 | Friendly |
| 5 | 14 August 2013 | Philip II Arena, Skopje, Macedonia | Bulgaria | 1–0 | 2–0 | Friendly |
| 6 | 5 March 2014 | Philip II Arena, Skopje, Macedonia | Latvia | 2–1 | 2–1 | Friendly |
| 7 | 8 September 2014 | Estadi Ciutat de València, Valencia, Spain | Spain | 2–1 | 5–1 | 2016 Euro qualifier |

== Honours ==
Olimpija

- Slovenian Second League: 2008–09

Maribor

- Slovenian PrvaLiga: 2011–12, 2012–13, 2014–15
- Slovenian Cup: 2011–12, 2012–13, 2015–16
- Slovenian Supercup: 2012, 2013, 2014

Astana

- Kazakhstan Premier League: 2016

Shkëndija

- Macedonian First Football League: 2018–19

Individual

- PrvaLiga Player of the season: 2012–13
- PrvaLiga Team of the Year: 2013
- Macedonian Footballer of the Year: 2012, 2014
