= Jean-Philippe Mendy =

French footballer (born 1987)

Personal information
- Date of birth: 4 March 1987 (age 39)
- Place of birth: Élancourt, France
- Height: 1.92 m (6 ft 4 in)
- Position: Striker

Team information
- Current team: TFC
- Number: 14

Youth career
- 1993–1999: OSC Élancourt
- 1999–2001: FC Versailles 78
- 2001–2006: Football Croix-de-Savoie 74

Senior career*
Years	Team	Apps	(Gls)
2006–2009	Dinamo București	10	(0)
2007–2008	→ Petrolul Ploieşti (loan)	3	(0)
2008–2009	→ Dinamo II București	19	(8)
2011–2012	SPAL	23	(1)
2013	Koper	13	(3)
2013–2016	Maribor	88	(37)
2016	Shijiazhuang Ever Bright	13	(1)
2017	Baniyas	8	(6)
2018–2019	Slaven Belupo	15	(4)
2019–2020	PT Prachuap	7	(1)
2020	Al Urooba		
2025–	TFC	2	(0)
- * Club domestic league appearances and goals as of 4 August 2019

Jean-Philippe Mendy (born 4 March 1987) is a French footballer who plays for UAE Third Division League club TFC as a midfielder, and he was later in his career moved forward.

== Career ==
Mendy started playing football, aged 6, at OSC Élancourt, before moving, aged 12, to FC Versailles 78, and at some point after, to Football Croix-de-Savoie 74, now known as Evian Thonon Gaillard F.C. Aged 14, he spent some time at Clairefontaine.

In the summer of 2006, he played a single friendly match for the Swiss third-tier side CS Chênois, a 5–0 loss against the Romanian team Dinamo București. Despite the loss, he was noticed by Dinamo's coach Mircea Rednic, and brought to the Romanian club. Despite never officially being a CS Chênois player, he was erroneously presented as such by the Romanian media.

He made his debut for the Bucharest club on 11 November 2006, coming in the 83rd minute for Claudiu Niculescu, in a 3–0 home win against FC Oțelul Galați. His UEFA Cup debut was on 14 December 2006, after he came in for Ionel Dănciulescu in the 77th minute of the 3–1 away loss vs. Tottenham Hotspur and scored, in the 91st minute, what would prove to be his first and only goal for Dinamo's senior team.

After the 2006–07 season, he spent time on loan at second-tier side Petrolul Ploieşti, and Dinamo's B side, also playing at that level, but the rest of his time in Romania was marred by a knee injury and operation, suffered after another player fell on it. Because of that, he would only feature in one more match for Dinamo, in July 2009. After his recovery, he signed in the beginning of 2011 for the Italian Lega Pro Prima Divisione team SPAL 1907. However, his convalescence was not yet over, leaving him unable to sprint properly, so he required another operation, losing another year of football.

He was brought to Slovenia by Koper's coach Rodolfo Vanoli, who saw him play at SPAL. In summer 2013, he moved to the Slovenian champions Maribor, where he went on to score 14 goals in 29 league matches in his first season. In three seasons playing for Maribor, he scored a total of 42 goals in 125 appearances for the club in all competitions.

In June 2016 he moved to the Chinese Super League team Shijiazhuang Ever Bright.

== Personal life ==
Mendy, a child of Senegalese parents born in France, is multilingual, speaking five languages: English, Italian, Romanian, French, and Wolof. In April 2014 he got married in Maribor to Lisette Mendy and became a father to a son in May.

== Honours ==
Dinamo București

- Liga I (1): 2006–07

Maribor

- Slovenian PrvaLiga (2): 2013–14, 2014–15
- Slovenian Cup (1): 2015–16
- Slovenian Supercup (1): 2014

PT Prachuap

- Thai League Cup (1): 2019
