= Welle N'Diaye =

Senegalese footballer

Personal information
- Full name: Welle N'Diaye
- Date of birth: 5 April 1990 (age 36)
- Place of birth: Dakar, Senegal
- Height: 1.86 m (6 ft 1 in)
- Positions: Midfielder; forward

Team information
- Current team: Niarry Tally

Youth career
- Palermo

Senior career*
Years	Team	Apps	(Gls)
2010–2014	Gorica	55	(6)
2011	→ Brda (loan)		
2014–2016	Maribor	15	(2)
2016	Maribor B	1	(1)
2016–	Niarry Tally		
- * Club domestic league appearances and goals as of 4 June 2016

Welle N'Diaye (born 5 April 1990) is a Senegalese footballer who plays as a midfielder for Niarry Tally.

== Career ==
N'Diaye signed his first professional contract in September 2010 with Slovenian club Gorica. He was capped once in the 2010–11 Slovenian PrvaLiga. In January 2011 he was loaned to Brda. He later returned to play for Gorica. He moved to Maribor on 30 June 2014. He left the club in June 2016 after his contract expired.

== Honours ==
Maribor

- Slovenian PrvaLiga: 2014–15
- Slovenian Supercup: 2014
- Slovenian Cup: 2015–16
