= Mitja Viler =

Slovenian footballer (born 1986)

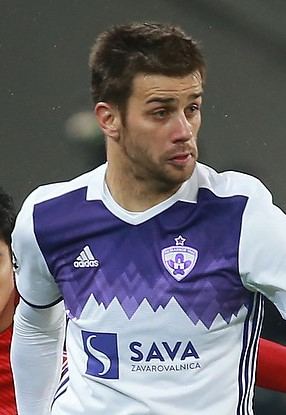
- Viler with Maribor in November 2017

Personal information
- Date of birth: 1 September 1986 (age 40)
- Place of birth: Koper, SFR Yugoslavia
- Height: 1.81 m (5 ft 11 in)
- Position: Left-back

Youth career
- –2005: Koper

Senior career*
Years	Team	Apps	(Gls)
2005–2010	Koper	142	(5)
2005	→ Izola (loan)	4	(0)
2006	→ Jadran Dekani (loan)	4	(3)
2010–2020	Maribor	256	(7)
2021	Koper	13	(0)
Total		419	(15)

International career
2001	Slovenia U15	8	(0)
2006–2007	Slovenia U20	5	(0)
2007–2008	Slovenia U21	5	(0)
2017	Slovenia	2	(0)
- * Club domestic league appearances and goals

Mitja Viler (born 1 September 1986) is a Slovenian former footballer who played as a left-back. He spent his entire career in his homeland Slovenia, making over 400 appearances in the Slovenian top division with Koper and Maribor.

At international level, he earned two caps for the Slovenia national team in 2017.

== Club career ==
Viler started playing football when his father, who was also a football player and later a coach, introduced him to the game. Earlier in career, he was a utility player and played on several different positions. Before moving to Maribor in 2010, he played for Koper and made a total of 142 appearances for the club in the Slovenian first division, 1. SNL, scoring five goals in the process. He was part of the squad that won the first-ever national championship for Koper during the 2009–10 season. With Maribor, he won the league championship during the 2010–11 season, his second consecutive championship. Between 2011–12 and 2014–15, Viler won another four consecutive championships with Maribor.

On 21 October 2014, Viler scored an own goal in a 6–0 UEFA Champions League loss to Chelsea, and was substituted minutes later. On 22 August 2017, Viler scored the only goal for Maribor against Hapoel Be'er Sheva in the second leg of the play-off round of the 2017–18 UEFA Champions League, helping his team to qualify for the group stage of the competition for the third time in history.

On 29 December 2020, Maribor retired his squad number 28 until 2030. The next day, Viler returned to Koper after ten years.

After a brief spell with Koper, Viler retired from professional football in November 2021.

== Honours ==
Koper

- Slovenian PrvaLiga: 2009–10
- Slovenian Cup: 2005–06, 2006–07

Maribor

- Slovenian PrvaLiga: 2010–11, 2011–12, 2012–13, 2013–14, 2014–15, 2016–17, 2018–19
- Slovenian Cup: 2011–12, 2012–13, 2015–16
- Slovenian Supercup: 2012, 2013, 2014
