= Zahovič =

Zahovič (also spelt Zahović) is a Slovenian surname. People with the surname include:

- Zlatko Zahovič, a Slovenian footballer
- Luka Zahović, a Slovenian footballer
