= Damjan Bohar =

Slovenian footballer (born 1991)

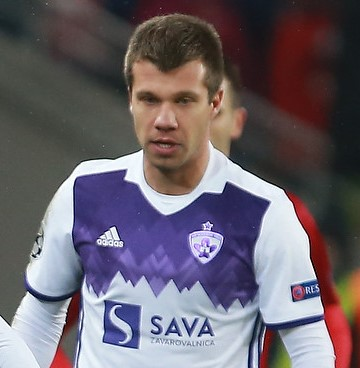
- Bohar with Maribor in November 2017

Personal information
- Date of birth: 18 October 1991 (age 35)
- Place of birth: Murska Sobota, Slovenia
- Height: 1.72 m (5 ft 8 in)
- Position: Left winger

Youth career
- Križevci
- –2010: Mura 05

Senior career*
Years	Team	Apps	(Gls)
2008–2013	Mura 05	122	(27)
2013–2018	Maribor	130	(21)
2018–2020	Zagłębie Lubin	75	(26)
2020–2022	Osijek	53	(11)
2022–2024	Zagłębie Lubin	36	(4)
2022–2023	Zagłębie Lubin II	2	(0)
2024–2025	Koper	15	(1)

International career
2007–2008	Slovenia U17		
2012	Slovenia U21	1	(0)
2014–2021	Slovenia	16	(1)
- * Club domestic league appearances and goals as of 19 December 2025

Damjan Bohar (born 18 October 1991) is a Slovenian professional footballer who plays as a left winger. Besides Slovenia, he has played in Poland and Croatia.

== International career ==
Bohar made his debut for Slovenia in a November 2014 friendly match against Colombia, coming on as a 59th-minute substitute for Dejan Lazarević, and earned a total of 16 caps, scoring 1 goal. His final international was a September 2021 World Cup qualification match against Malta.

== Career statistics ==
=== International ===
Scores and results list Slovenia's goal tally first, score column indicates score after each Bohar goal.

List of international goals scored by Damjan Bohar
No.	Date	Venue	Opponent	Score	Result	Competition
1	6 September 2020	Stožice Stadium, Ljubljana, Slovenia	Moldova	1–0	1–0	2020–21 UEFA Nations League C

== Honours ==
Maribor

- Slovenian PrvaLiga: 2013–14, 2014–15, 2016–17
- Slovenian Cup: 2015–16
- Slovenian Supercup: 2013, 2014
