= Sintayehu Sallalich =

Israeli footballer

Personal information
- Full name: Sintayehu Sallalich
- Date of birth: 20 June 1991 (age 35)
- Place of birth: Qwara, Ethiopia
- Height: 1.67 m (5 ft 6 in)
- Position: Winger

Team information
- Current team: Hapoel Kfar Saba

Youth career
- Maccabi Haifa

Senior career*
Years	Team	Apps	(Gls)
2010–2014	Maccabi Haifa	11	(0)
2011–2012	→ Hapoel Acre (loan)	37	(7)
2012–2013	→ Ironi Kiryat Shmona (loan)	29	(5)
2013–2014	→ Beitar Jerusalem (loan)	20	(2)
2014–2017	Maribor	74	(11)
2017–2020	Maccabi Haifa	73	(14)
2020–2021	Hapoel Be'er Sheva	27	(3)
2021–2022	Gençlerbirliği	23	(1)
2022–2023	Hapoel Tel Aviv	8	(0)
2023	Nea Salamis Famagusta	12	(1)
2023–2024	Sektzia Ness Ziona	29	(9)
2024–	Hapoel Kfar Saba	29	(0)

International career
2009	Israel U19	3	(0)
2010–2013	Israel U21	12	(1)
- * Club domestic league appearances and goals as of 1 June 2024

Sintayehu Sallalich (or Sintiahau Solelik, Hebrew: סינטאיהו סלליך; born 20 June 1991) is a professional footballer who plays as a winger. Born in Ethiopia, he has represented Israel at youth level.

== Early life ==
Kinda was born in Qwara, Ethiopia, to an Ethiopian-Jewish family. He immigrated to Israel with his family, at the age of nine.

== Club career statistics ==
Correct as of 1 June 2022.

Club	Season	League		Cup		League Cup		Europe/other		Total	
Club	Season	Apps	Goals	Apps	Goals	Apps	Goals	Apps	Goals	Apps	Goals
Maccabi Haifa	2009–10	1	0	0	0	0	0	0	0	1	0
Maccabi Haifa	2010–11	10	0	0	0	2	0	1	0	13	0
Hapoel Acre	2011–12	37	7	1	0	3	1	0	0	41	8
Ironi Kiryat Shmona	2012–13	29	5	3	1	1	0	3	0	36	6
Maccabi Haifa	2013–14	0	0	0	0	0	0	2	0	2	0
Beitar Jerusalem	2013–14	20	2	2	0	0	0	0	0	22	2
Maribor	2014–15	27	5	3	0	0	0	9	0	39	5
Maribor	2015–16	25	5	4	2	0	0	0	0	29	7
Maribor	2016–17	22	1	3	0	0	0	4	0	29	1
Maccabi Haifa	2017–18	32	7	4	2	2	0	0	0	32	7
Maccabi Haifa	2018–19	19	2	2	1	5	0	0	0	19	2
Maccabi Haifa	2019–20	22	5	2	0	0	0	0	0	22	5
Hapoel Be'er Sheva	2020–21	27	3	1	0	1	1	10	0	39	4
Gençlerbirliği	2021–22	23	1	2	1	0	0	0	0	25	2
Hapoel Tel Aviv	2022–23	0	0	0	0	0	0	0	0	0	0
Career total		294	43	27	7	14	2	29	0	349	49

== Honours ==
=== Club ===
Maccabi Haifa

- Israeli Premier League: 2010–11

Maribor

- Slovenian PrvaLiga: 2014–15, 2016–17
- Slovenian Cup: 2015–16
- Slovenian Supercup: 2014
