= Sanin Muminović =

Croatian footballer (born 1990)

Personal information
- Date of birth: 2 November 1990 (age 36)
- Place of birth: Srebrenica, SFR Yugoslavia
- Height: 1.83 m (6 ft 0 in)
- Position: Defender

Team information
- Current team: Orijent
- Number: 14

Senior career*
Years	Team	Apps	(Gls)
2011	Orijent		
2011–2014	Pomorac 1921	60	(2)
2014	Krka		
2015	Zavrč	14	(1)
2015–2016	Valdres	9	(1)
2016–2017	Novigrad	10	(0)
2017–2018	Aluminij	32	(0)
2018	Al-Quwa Al-Jawiya		(2)
2018–2020	Aluminij	36	(2)
2020	Horn	13	(1)
2021	Krupa	12	(0)
2021–2023	Stripfing	40	(2)
2023	Krk	14	(0)
2024–	Orijent	16	(0)
- * Club domestic league appearances and goals as of 17 August 2024

Sanin Muminović (born 2 November 1990) is a Croatian professional footballer who most recently played as a defender for Orijent.

== Career ==
Muminović started his senior career with Orijent. After that, he played for Pomorac 1921, Krka, Zavrč, Valdres, and Novigrad. In 2017, Muminović signed with Slovenian PrvaLiga club Aluminij, where he made 36 appearances and scored one goal.

On 10 August 2020, he joined Austrian club Horn.

On 31 January 2021, Muminović signed a contract with Bosnian Premier League club Krupa. He made his official debut for the club on 27 February 2021, in a league game against Zrinjski Mostar.
