= Dare Vršič =

Slovenian footballer (born 1984)

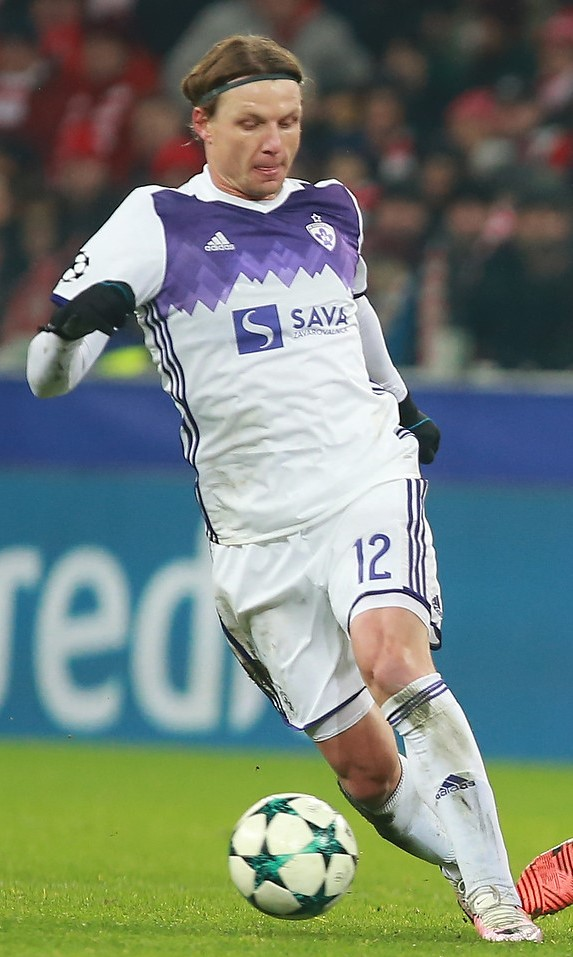
- Vršič with Maribor in 2017

Personal information
- Date of birth: 26 September 1984 (age 42)
- Place of birth: Maribor, SFR Yugoslavia
- Height: 1.80 m (5 ft 11 in)
- Position: Midfielder

Team information
- Current team: Korte

Youth career
- –2002: Mura

Senior career*
Years	Team	Apps	(Gls)
2001–2003	Mura	30	(1)
2003–2005	Celje	58	(16)
2005–2007	Žilina	41	(12)
2007–2010	Politehnica Timişoara	22	(0)
2010	→ Koper (loan)	14	(9)
2011–2012	Olimpija Ljubljana	50	(28)
2012–2014	Austria Wien	17	(0)
2014–2019	Maribor	140	(20)
2019–2021	Koper	51	(11)
2021–2022	Triglav Kranj	14	(1)
2022	Izola	2	(1)
2022	ASK Klagenfurt	15	(5)
2023	Zavrč	0	(0)
2023	Novigrad 1947	0	(0)
2024–	Korte		

International career
2001	Slovenia U17	1	(0)
2003–2005	Slovenia U20	6	(1)
2003–2006	Slovenia U21	12	(1)
2007–2012	Slovenia	13	(3)
- * Club domestic league appearances and goals as of 4 January 2024

Dare Vršič (born 26 September 1984) is a Slovenian footballer who plays for Korte as a midfielder. Besides Slovenia, he has played in Slovakia, Romania and Austria.

== International career ==
Vršič was capped 13 times for the Slovenia national team between 2007 and 2012. He made his debut on 2 June 2007 against Romania.

== Career statistics ==
=== International ===
Scores and results list Slovenia's goal tally first, score column indicates score after each Vršič goal.

List of international goals scored by Dare Vršič
No.	Date	Venue	Opponent	Score	Result	Competition
1	2 June 2007	Arena Petrol, Celje, Slovenia	Romania	1–2	1–2	UEFA Euro 2008 qualifying
2	22 August 2007	Podgorica City Stadium, Podgorica, Montenegro	Montenegro	1–1	1–1	Friendly
3	11 October 2011	Ljudski vrt, Maribor, Slovenia	Serbia	1–0	1–0	UEFA Euro 2012 qualifying

== Honours ==
=== Club ===
Celje

- Slovenian Cup: 2004–05

Žilina

- Slovak Super Liga: 2006–07

Koper

- Slovenian PrvaLiga: 2009–10

Austria Wien

- Austrian Football Bundesliga: 2012–13

Maribor

- Slovenian PrvaLiga: 2013–14, 2014–15, 2016–17, 2018–19
- Slovenian Cup: 2015–16
- Slovenian Supercup: 2014

=== Individual ===
- Slovenian PrvaLiga top scorer: 2011–12
