= Simone Napoli =

Italian footballer (born 1994)

Personal information
- Date of birth: 10 July 1994
- Place of birth: Italy
- Position(s): Defender

Senior career*
Years	Team	Apps	(Gls)
-2013	Juventus FC	0	(0)
2012-2013	Torino F.C.→(loan)	0	(0)
2013-2014	Club de Gimnasia y Esgrima La Plata	0	(0)
2014-2015	ND Gorica	14	(1)
2016	CSM Ceahlăul Piatra Neamț	8	(0)
2017	FC Locarno		
- *Club domestic league appearances and goals

Simone Napoli (born 10 July 1994 in Italy) is an Italian footballer.
