= Vjekoslav Andrić =

Slovenian footballer

Personal information
- Full name: Vjekoslav Andrić
- Date of birth: 5 August 1992 (age 34)
- Place of birth: Ljubljana, Slovenia
- Height: 1.91 m (6 ft 3 in)
- Position: Goalkeeper

Youth career
- –2011: Domžale

Senior career*
Years	Team	Apps	(Gls)
2012–2013	Domžale	1	(0)
2012	→ Bela Krajina (loan)	12	(0)
2012–2013	→ Calcit Kamnik (loan)	16	(0)
2013–2017	Radomlje	47	(0)

International career
2008	Slovenia U16	3	(0)
2012–2013	Slovenia U20	3	(0)
- * Club domestic league appearances and goals as of 1 July 2017

Vjekoslav Andrić (born 5 August 1992) is a Slovenian footballer who plays as a goalkeeper.
