= 2014–15 Slovenian PrvaLiga =

Slovenian PrvaLiga
- Season: 2014–15
- Dates: 18 July 2014 – 30 May 2015
- Champions: Maribor (13th title)
- Relegated: Radomlje
- Champions League: Maribor
- Europa League: Celje; Domžale; Koper (cup winners)
- Matches: 180
- Goals: 455 (2.53 per match)
- Best player: Benjamin Verbič
- Top goalscorer: Marcos Tavares (17 goals)
- Biggest home win: Rudar 7–2 Zavrč
- Biggest away win: Radomlje 1–6 Maribor
- Highest scoring: Rudar 7–2 Zavrč
- Longest winning run: 8 games Domžale; Maribor
- Longest unbeaten run: 20 games Celje
- Longest winless run: 10 games Radomlje
- Longest losing run: 8 games Radomlje
- Highest attendance: 10,000; Maribor 3–3 Olimpija
- Lowest attendance: 100; Rudar 2–2 Koper
- Total attendance: 194,590
- Average attendance: 1,081

The 2014–15 Slovenian PrvaLiga was the 24th edition of the Slovenian PrvaLiga since its establishment in 1991. Also known by the abbreviation 1. SNL, PrvaLiga was contested by the top ten clubs in Slovenia, for the title of national champions.

== Competition format ==
Each team played 36 matches (18 home and 18 away). Teams played four matches against each other (two at home and two away).

== Stadiums and locations ==
Location of teams in the 2014–15 Slovenian PrvaLiga

Team	Location	Stadium	Capacity^{1}
Celje	Celje	Arena Petrol	13,059
Domžale	Domžale	Domžale Sports Park	3,100
Gorica	Nova Gorica	Nova Gorica Sports Park	3,100
Koper	Koper	Bonifika	4,047
Krka	Novo Mesto	Portoval	500
Maribor	Maribor	Ljudski vrt	12,702
Olimpija	Ljubljana	Stožice	16,038
Radomlje	Radomlje	Domžale Sports Park^{2}	3,100
Rudar	Velenje	Ob Jezeru	1,864
Zavrč	Zavrč	Zavrč Sports Park^{3}	962

^{1}Seating capacity only. Some stadiums (e.g. Krka, Rudar) also have standing areas.
^{2}Radomlje played their matches at the Domžale Sports Park because their stadium in Radomlje, roughly five kilometres from Domžale, did not meet the Football Association of Slovenia PrvaLiga stadia criteria.
^{3}Zavrč played the first half of the season at the Ptuj City Stadium, with the capacity of 2,207 seats, because their regular stadium went through a major reconstruction.

== League table ==
=== Standings ===
Pos	Team	Pld	W	D	L	GF	GA	GD	Pts	Qualification or relegation
1	Maribor (C)	36	24	7	5	74	32	+42	79	Qualification to Champions League second qualifying round
2	Celje	36	20	10	6	58	31	+27	70	Qualification to Europa League first qualifying round
3	Domžale	36	21	5	10	52	22	+30	68	Qualification to Europa League first qualifying round
4	Olimpija	36	17	10	9	55	32	+23	61	
5	Zavrč	36	15	4	17	38	52	−14	49	
6	Rudar	36	12	10	14	44	43	+1	46	
7	Krka	36	11	7	18	38	54	−16	40	
8	Koper	36	12	4	20	35	58	−23	40	Qualification to Europa League first qualifying round (Note: Koper qualified for the Europa League first qualifying round by winning the 2014–15 Slovenian Football Cup.)
9	Gorica (O)	36	10	7	19	40	46	−6	37	Qualification to relegation play-off
10	Radomlje (R)	36	4	4	28	21	85	−64	16	Relegation to Slovenian Second League

Source: Slovenian PrvaLiga (in Slovene)
Rules for classification: 1) points; 2) points in head-to-head matches; 3) goal difference in head-to-head matches; 4) goals scored in head-to-head matches; 5) total goal difference; 6) total goals scored
(C) Champions; (O) Play-off winners; (R) Relegated

=== Positions by round ===
Team ╲ Round	1	2	3	4	5	6	7	8	9	10	11	12	13	14	15	16	17	18	19	20	21	22	23	24	25	26	27	28	29	30	31	32	33	34	35	36
Maribor	4	3	3	3	4	3	5	3	3	2	2	2	2	3	3	4	4	3	2	2	1	1	1	1	1	1	1	1	1	1	1	1	1	1	1	1
Celje	7	9	6	5	5	4	4	5	5	5	5	5	5	5	4	3	3	4	3	3	3	2	3	2	2	3	3	3	3	2	2	2	2	2	2	2
Domžale	3	4	1	1	1	1	1	1	1	1	1	1	1	1	1	1	1	1	1	1	2	3	2	3	3	2	2	2	2	3	3	3	3	3	3	3
Olimpija	1	1	2	2	2	2	2	2	2	3	3	3	3	2	2	2	2	2	4	4	4	4	4	4	4	4	4	4	4	4	4	4	4	4	4	4
Zavrč	5	2	5	4	3	5	3	4	4	4	4	4	4	4	5	5	5	5	5	5	5	5	5	5	5	5	5	5	5	5	5	5	5	5	5	5
Rudar	9	10	7	7	8	6	7	7	7	7	7	7	7	7	7	7	6	6	6	6	7	7	6	7	7	7	6	6	6	6	6	6	6	6	6	6
Krka	10	6	8	8	9	9	9	9	9	8	9	9	9	9	9	9	9	9	9	9	9	9	9	9	9	9	9	8	9	9	9	8	8	8	8	7
Koper	2	5	4	6	6	7	6	6	6	6	6	6	6	6	6	6	7	7	7	7	6	6	7	6	6	6	7	7	7	7	7	7	7	7	7	8
Gorica	8	8	10	9	7	8	8	8	8	9	8	8	8	8	8	8	8	8	8	8	8	8	8	8	8	8	8	9	8	8	8	9	9	9	9	9
Radomlje	4	6	9	10	10	10	10	10	10	10	10	10	10	10	10	10	10	10	10	10	10	10	10	10	10	10	10	10	10	10	10	10	10	10	10	10

Leader
Second
Third
Relegation play-off
Relegation to 2.SNL

Source: Slovenian PrvaLiga (in Slovene)

=== Results ===
==== First half of the season ====
Home \ Away	CEL	DOM	GOR	KOP	KRK	MAR	OLI	RAD	RUD	ZAV
Celje		2–0	2–0	1–1	3–0	3–1	0–0	5–0	1–1	0–1
Domžale	1–0		3–0	2–0	2–0	2–0	0–0	3–0	1–1	1–3
Gorica	1–1	0–1		0–1	2–1	0–2	0–3	4–0	1–2	1–0
Koper	0–2	0–1	1–0		1–0	1–2	1–2	1–2	1–3	2–1
Krka	1–1	0–1	2–1	1–3		1–3	2–1	0–0	1–1	2–3
Maribor	1–2	0–1	2–1	4–0	2–0		3–3	3–2	1–0	3–0
Olimpija	1–3	2–1	0–0	4–0	3–1	0–0		4–0	2–0	2–0
Radomlje	0–3	0–2	0–3	1–2	0–2	0–0	1–4		1–2	1–2
Rudar	0–0	0–1	1–0	2–3	3–1	0–1	0–0	2–0		0–2
Zavrč	0–0	0–2	0–0	1–0	2–0	0–1	0–2	2–1	1–0	

Source: Slovenian PrvaLiga (in Slovene)
Legend: Blue = home team win; Yellow = draw; Red = away team win.

==== Second half of the season ====
Home \ Away	CEL	DOM	GOR	KOP	KRK	MAR	OLI	RAD	RUD	ZAV
Celje		0–0	0–3	3–2	2–1	0–2	0–0	3–2	1–3	3–0
Domžale	0–1		3–1	3–0	2–1	0–0	0–1	4–0	4–0	2–3
Gorica	2–2	1–2		1–2	3–0	1–1	1–2	0–0	3–0	4–0
Koper	0–1	1–0	2–0		0–2	1–4	2–1	2–0	0–3	1–2
Krka	0–4	3–2	0–2	3–0		1–3	0–0	1–1	2–0	3–0
Maribor	4–1	1–0	5–1	0–0	2–2		4–1	4–1	3–2	2–1
Olimpija	1–2	0–2	3–1	0–0	1–2	0–1		3–1	0–0	3–1
Radomlje	0–1	0–3	1–0	2–1	0–1	1–6	0–4		1–0	0–4
Rudar	1–3	0–0	1–2	2–2	0–0	2–0	2–0	3–2		7–2
Zavrč	1–2	1–0	0–0	2–1	0–1	1–3	1–2	1–0	0–0	

Source: Slovenian PrvaLiga (in Slovene)
Legend: Blue = home team win; Yellow = draw; Red = away team win.

== PrvaLiga play-off ==
The two-legged play-off between Gorica, the ninth-placed team of the 2014–15 PrvaLiga, and Aluminij, the second-placed team of the 2014–15 Second League, was played. The winner earned a place in the 2015–16 Slovenian PrvaLiga.

3 June 2015
17:00 CEST

Gorica	0–0	Aluminij
	Report

Nova Gorica Sports Park, Nova Gorica
Attendance: 800
Referee: Damir Skomina
7 June 2015
17:00 CEST

Aluminij	1–2	Gorica
Škoflek 4'	Report	Žigon 8', 41'

Kidričevo Sports Park, Kidričevo
Attendance: 600
Referee: Nejc Kajtazović

Gorica won 2–1 on aggregate.

== Awards ==
=== PrvaLiga Player of the Season ===
- Benjamin Verbič

=== PrvaLiga U23 Player of the Season ===
- Benjamin Verbič

=== SPINS XI ===
PrvaLiga Team of the Year 2015
Player	Team	Position
Nejc Vidmar	Domžale	Goalkeeper
Aleksander Rajčević	Maribor	Defence
Uroš Korun	Domžale	Defence
Petar Stojanović	Maribor	Defence
Mitja Viler	Maribor	Defence
Agim Ibraimi	Maribor	Midfield
Miha Zajc	Olimpija	Midfield
Blaž Vrhovec	Celje	Midfield
Benjamin Verbič	Celje	Forward
Andraž Šporar	Olimpija	Forward
Marcos Tavares	Maribor	Forward

== Statistics ==
=== Goals ===
Rank	Player	Club	Goals
1	(Brazil) Marcos Tavares	Maribor	17
2	(Slovenia) Benjamin Verbič	Celje	15
3	(Slovenia) Andraž Šporar	Olimpija Ljubljana	13
4	(Slovenia) Luka Zahović	Maribor	12
4	(Nigeria) Sunny Omoregie	Celje	12
6	(Slovenia) Dalibor Volaš	Maribor	10
7	(Slovenia) Ivan Firer	Rudar Velenje	9
7	(Slovenia) Dragan Jelić	Rudar Velenje	9
9	(Slovenia) Mitja Lotrič	Koper	8
10	(Slovenia) Luka Majcen	Gorica	7
10	(Slovenia) Damjan Bohar	Maribor	7
10	(Slovenia) Dejan Žigon	Gorica	7
10	(France) Benjamin Morel	Domžale	7
10	(Croatia) Danijel Miškić	Celje	7

Source: Slovenian PrvaLiga

=== Assists ===
Rank	Player	Club	Assists
1	(Slovenia) Nejc Skubic	Domžale	10
1	(Slovenia) Benjamin Verbič	Celje	10
3	(Slovenia) Mitja Viler	Maribor	8
3	(Slovenia) Dare Vršič	Maribor	8
3	(Israel) Sintayehu Sallalich	Maribor	8
3	(Croatia) Mario Babić	Rudar Velenje	8
7	(North Macedonia) Agim Ibraimi	Maribor	6
7	(Slovenia) Doris Kelenc	Zavrč	6
9	Seven players	N/A	5

== See also ==
- 2014 Slovenian Supercup
- 2014–15 Slovenian Cup
- 2014–15 Slovenian Second League
