= 2013–14 Slovenian PrvaLiga =

Slovenian PrvaLiga
- Season: 2013–14
- Dates: 12 July 2013 – 25 May 2014
- Champions: Maribor (12th title)
- Relegated: Triglav
- Champions League: Maribor
- Europa League: Koper; Rudar Velenje; Gorica (cup winners)
- Matches: 180
- Goals: 483 (2.68 per match)
- Best player: Massimo Coda
- Top goalscorer: Mate Eterović (19 goals)
- Biggest home win: Maribor 6–1 Koper; Rudar 6–1 Krka
- Biggest away win: Krka 0–5 Maribor
- Highest scoring: Maribor 5–3 Domžale
- Longest winning run: 7 games Maribor
- Longest unbeaten run: 9 games Maribor
- Longest winless run: 8 games Celje, Domžale and Triglav
- Longest losing run: 6 games Triglav
- Highest attendance: 6,500; Maribor 2–0 Olimpija
- Lowest attendance: 50; Olimpija 0–1 Krka
- Total attendance: 158,947
- Average attendance: 883

The 2013–14 Slovenian PrvaLiga was the 23rd edition of the Slovenian PrvaLiga since its establishment in 1991. Also known by the abbreviation 1. SNL, PrvaLiga was contested by the top ten clubs in Slovenia, for the title of national champions. The fixture schedule was released on 28 June 2013. The season began on 13 July 2013 and ended on 25 May 2014.

Maribor were the defending champions, having won their 11th league title the previous season. The season featured eight teams from the 2012–13 Slovenian PrvaLiga and two teams from the 2012–13 Slovenian Second League, Zavrč, who was promoted directly as the winners of the second division and Krka, which was promoted as a third placed team. The worst placed team during the 2012–13 season, Aluminij, was demoted to the Slovenian Second League, while Mura 05 was denied a license by the Slovenian Football Association, due to the club's poor financial state, and in the following weeks they subsequently filed for bankruptcy and folded.

== Stadiums and locations ==
Location of teams in the 2013–14 Slovenian PrvaLiga

Team	Location	Stadium	Capacity^{1}
Celje	Celje	Arena Petrol	13,059
Domžale	Domžale	Sports Park	3,100
Gorica	Nova Gorica	Sports Park	3,100
Koper	Koper	Bonifika	4,047
Krka	Novo Mesto	Portoval	500
Maribor	Maribor	Ljudski vrt	12,702
Olimpija	Ljubljana	Stožice	16,038
Rudar	Velenje	Ob Jezeru	1,864
Triglav	Kranj	Stanko Mlakar	2,060
Zavrč	Zavrč	Sports Park	1,200

^{1}Seating capacity only. Some stadiums (e.g. Krka, Rudar, Zavrč) also have standing areas.

== League table ==
Pos	Team	Pld	W	D	L	GF	GA	GD	Pts	Qualification or relegation
1	Maribor (C)	36	24	5	7	78	31	+47	77	Qualification to Champions League second qualifying round
2	Koper	36	21	6	9	52	36	+16	69	Qualification to Europa League first qualifying round
3	Rudar	36	18	9	9	55	33	+22	63	Qualification to Europa League first qualifying round
4	Gorica	36	16	10	10	60	32	+28	58	Qualification to Europa League second qualifying round
5	Zavrč	36	16	5	15	58	63	−5	53	
6	Domžale	36	10	15	11	47	36	+11	45	
7	Olimpija	36	12	6	18	38	56	−18	42	
8	Celje	36	10	7	19	30	58	−28	37	
9	Krka	36	8	7	21	31	64	−33	31	Relegation play-offs cancelled
10	Triglav Kranj (R)	36	6	8	22	34	74	−40	26	Relegation to Slovenian Second League

Source: Slovenian PrvaLiga (in Slovene)
Rules for classification: 1) points; 2) goal difference; 3) number of goals scored.
(C) Champions; (R) Relegated

== Results ==
=== First half of the season ===
Home \ Away	CEL	DOM	GOR	KOP	KRK	MAR	OLI	RUD	TRI	ZAV
Celje		0–0	0–1	0–3	2–0	1–0	2–3	0–1	1–0	2–1
Domžale	4–0		1–1	0–1	4–0	0–1	1–2	0–0	2–2	1–1
Gorica	2–0	1–2		3–0	1–2	1–2	4–1	1–1	3–1	4–0
Koper	1–1	1–0	2–1		2–1	2–1	1–1	1–0	2–0	1–1
Krka	0–1	3–0	1–1	0–1		0–5	1–0	0–0	2–2	3–4
Maribor	5–1	5–3	1–1	6–1	3–0		2–0	1–1	1–2	2–1
Olimpija	0–2	0–3	2–2	1–0	5–0	0–3		1–2	3–1	3–2
Rudar	1–0	3–1	2–1	1–0	0–1	0–3	1–2		3–0	3–0
Triglav Kranj	2–2	0–3	0–1	0–3	1–0	0–1	1–0	1–1		1–2
Zavrč	2–1	2–2	0–2	1–0	3–0	1–0	2–1	2–1	2–1	

Source: Slovenian PrvaLiga (in Slovene)
Legend: Blue = home team win; Yellow = draw; Red = away team win.

=== Second half of the season ===
Home \ Away	CEL	DOM	GOR	KOP	KRK	MAR	OLI	RUD	TRI	ZAV
Celje		0–0	0–2	2–3	2–1	0–4	0–0	1–2	2–0	0–3
Domžale	2–0		1–1	3–1	0–0	1–2	1–2	0–0	4–1	3–0
Gorica	5–0	1–1		0–1	1–0	1–2	0–0	0–0	1–1	4–0
Koper	2–1	1–1	1–0		2–1	0–1	0–1	3–1	3–0	2–1
Krka	2–2	0–2	0–1	0–3		0–4	1–0	1–1	3–0	2–1
Maribor	2–2	0–0	2–0	2–2	3–1		2–0	0–2	2–1	3–4
Olimpija	0–1	0–0	0–2	1–0	0–1	2–0		0–3	1–1	3–2
Rudar	1–0	3–1	3–2	0–2	4–2	0–1	4–0		6–1	2–3
Triglav Kranj	0–1	1–0	1–5	2–2	1–1	0–2	5–2	0–1		3–1
Zavrč	3–0	0–0	1–3	1–2	2–1	0–4	3–1	1–1	5–1	

Source: Slovenian PrvaLiga (in Slovene)
Legend: Blue = home team win; Yellow = draw; Red = away team win.

== Relegation play-offs ==
Krka, who finished in ninth place in the league, were due to play (over two legs) against Radomlje, who finished in second place in the 2013–14 Slovenian Second League. However, Dob, the winners of the 2013–14 Slovenian Second League, rejected their promotion. Therefore, Radomlje claimed automatic promotion to the 2014–15 Slovenian PrvaLiga and the relegation play-off was cancelled, with Krka remaining in the top division.

== Top goalscorers ==
Rank	Player	Club	Goals
1	(Croatia) Mate Eterović	Rudar	19
2	(Italy) Massimo Coda	Gorica	18
3	(Bosnia and Herzegovina) Nusmir Fajić	Maribor	16
4	(France) Jean-Philippe Mendy	Maribor	14
5	(Brazil) Marcos Tavares	Maribor	13
6	(Peru) Gianluca Lapadula	Gorica	11
6	(Antigua and Barbuda) Josh Parker	Domžale	11
8	(Bosnia and Herzegovina) Goran Galešić	Koper	10
8	(Slovenia) Nik Omladič	Olimpija	10
8	(Slovenia) Benjamin Verbič	Celje	10
11	(Croatia) Matija Smrekar	Zavrč	9
11	(Slovenia) Jaka Štromajer	Koper	9
13	(Italy) Gianvito Misuraca	Gorica	8
13	(Croatia) Slobodan Vuk	Domžale	8
13	(Slovenia) Saša Živec	Gorica/Domžale	8

Source: PrvaLiga

== Attendance ==
Rank	Club	Total attendance	Matches played	Average
1	Maribor	55,600	18	3,089
2	Olimpija	16,597	18	922
3	Rudar Velenje	14,100	18	783
4	Zavrč	13,450	18	747
5	Celje	12,850	18	714
6	Koper	12,100	18	672
7	Domžale	9,970	18	554
8	Triglav Kranj	8,800	18	489
9	Krka	8,150	18	453
10	Gorica	7,330	18	407

== See also ==
- 2013 Slovenian Supercup
- 2013–14 Slovenian Football Cup
- 2013–14 Slovenian Second League
