= 2014 Slovenian Supercup =

Football match held in 2014

- Logo of the competition
- Event: 2014 Slovenian Supercup
Gorica	Maribor
1	4
- Date: 13 August 2014
- Venue: Nova Gorica Sports Park, Nova Gorica
- Referee: Mitja Žganec
- Attendance: 600

The 2014 Slovenian Supercup, known as Superpokal Telekom Slovenije 2014 due to sponsorship reasons, was the tenth edition of the Slovenian Supercup, an annual football match contested by the winners of the previous season's Slovenian PrvaLiga and Slovenian Cup competitions. The match was played on 13 August 2014 at the Nova Gorica Sports Park stadium in Nova Gorica between the 2013–14 Slovenian Football Cup winners Gorica and the 2013–14 Slovenian PrvaLiga winners Maribor.

== Match details ==
13 August 2014
20:15 CEST

Gorica	1–4	Maribor
Makinwa 65'	Report	Vuklišević 3'; Vršič 19' (pen.), 77' (pen.); Fajić 88'

Nova Gorica Sports Park, Nova Gorica
Attendance: 600
Referee: Mitja Žganec

Gorica	Maribor

Slovenian Supercup
2014 Winners
Maribor
4th title

== See also ==
- 2013–14 Slovenian PrvaLiga
- 2013–14 Slovenian Football Cup
- 2014–15 NK Maribor season
