= Perryfield Quarry =

Stone quarry in Dorset, England

Coordinates: 50.5389°N 2.4338°W

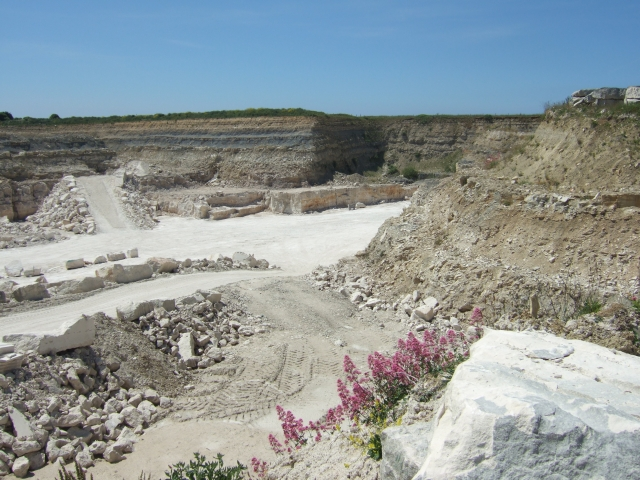
Perryfield Quarry

Perryfield Quarry is an operational stone quarry and part butterfly nature reserve located on the Isle of Portland, Dorset, England. It is situated towards the middle of the island, east of the village of Weston and south of the hamlet of Wakeham. The reserve section is now a valued home for a number of butterfly species, while the working quarry area is one of the largest active quarries on Portland. The quarry is owned by Portland Stone Firms Ltd, along with Broadcroft and Coombefield Quarries. The firm is the largest landholder on the island.

King Barrow Quarry, located close to the area of New Ground, in the north-east corner area of Tophill, is also another Portland nature reserve. Broadcroft Quarry is also a part butterfly reserve.

== History ==
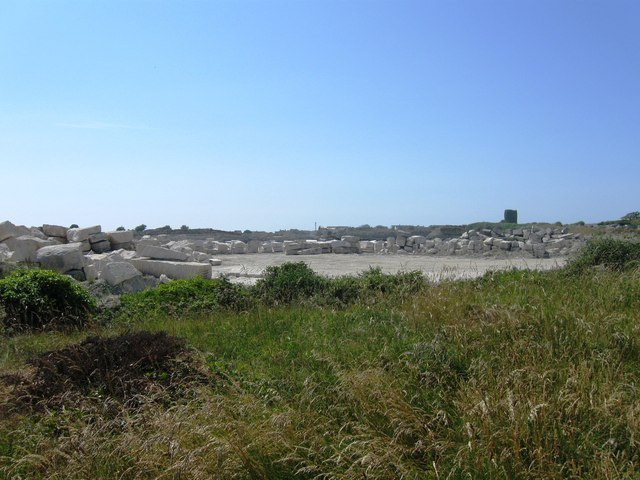
Perryfield Quarry

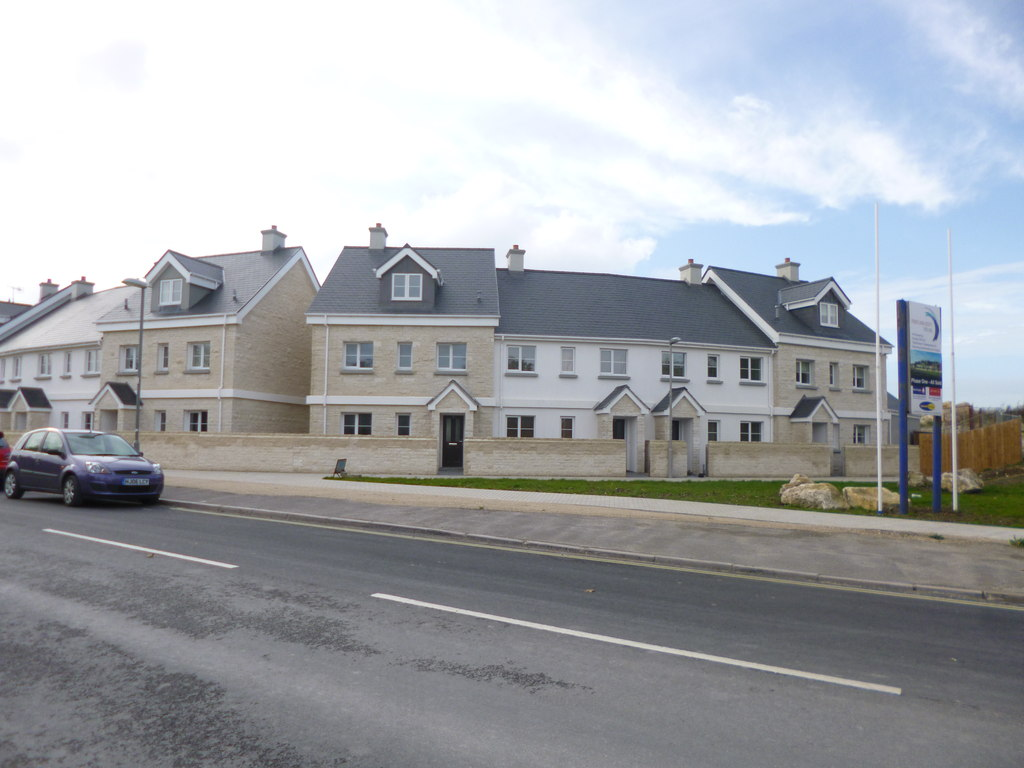
Pennsylvania Heights built on part of the quarry.

Perryfield Quarry was first quarried during the 1890s. Planning consent for modern day quarrying on Portland was granted in 1951, covering 324 hectares of the island. Portland Stone Firms Ltd received and still holds the planning consent for Coombefield, Perryfield and Broadcroft. There are substantial reserves of dimension Portland stone within the quarry which will last beyond the current planning consent, ending in 2042.

As an open cast quarry, this method of quarrying provides quicker extraction of raw block dimension stone whilst maintaining its integrity. Today Perryfield Quarry is at present Portland Stone Firms' main production site. It is being worked in a westerly direction. During its operational history the quarry did cease activity for a while, but was re-opened due to the demand for the particular stone at its site.

The quarry is noted for its excellent stone quality and bed heights. It is largely quarried for Perryfield Basebed, Roach, Shelly and Whitbed stone. The Whitbed stone is a popular buff white stone, containing shell fragments. It is known to be a durable building stone and has been used extensively in the United Kingdom, including in the restoration of Westminster Abbey in 1993, as well as in the building of Waterloo Bridge, completed in 1945. In 2012 the masons of Portland Stone Firms Ltd used large, specially selected blocks of stone from the quarry to carve classical panels and lintels for the Farringdon Street façade of the large new 'Sixty London' development at Holborn Viaduct.

Portland Stone Limited, another firm, operate out of four quarries on the island to extract stone to supply crushed materials. The stone is blasted, extracted, then crushed, screened, tested and loaded for transport. Aside from Perryfield, Broadcroft, Yeoland and Coombefield Quarries are also used for this purpose.

The quarry has a giant ammonite (Titanites) at its gates, and such ammonites can be found there. Bivalves, molluscs and other trace fossils of worm burrows are often found within the Basal Shell Bed, along with several different species of gastropods. The Purbeck Beds within the quarry are now covered in rubble, but once made up the top most part of the quarry.

In 2009 the small industrial area known as Perryfield Works was demolished for flats to be built on the corner facing Pennsylvania Castle. Perryfield House which stands in this area still remains derelict to date. A new housing estate Pennsylvania Heights has since been built on a former part of the quarry.

== Nature reserve ==
In recent years, an abandoned, infilled area of the quarry had become reclaimed by nature and wildlife. It became a designated nature reserve, leased as a reserve since 1998, and part of the Bottomcoombe Site of Nature Conservation Interest (SNCI) complex. The reserve is now known as Perryfield Quarry Nature Reserve or Perryfield Quarry and Butterfly Reserve. It has been leased by the Butterfly Conservation from the quarry company. Today this area is a haven for wildflowers and butterflies, while its tree and scrub cover is also very important for migrating birds. The reserve is part of Portland's Site of Special Scientific Interest (SSSI). Perryfield is one of two nature reserves managed by Butterfly Conservation on Portland; the other, Broadcroft Quarry, is close by and somewhat larger, having become a reserve four years earlier in 1994.

Spanning 1.2 hectares (approx 3 acres), the limestone grassland of the reserve provides a rich array of wildflowers, such as common bird's-foot-trefoil, horseshoe vetch, kidney vetch, ivy broomrape, Alexanders, large bindweed, white bryony, wild madder and charlock. These flowers make suitable conditions for butterflies and other insects such as the grey bush cricket. The sheltering copse of sycamores, as well as the scrub-covered slopes down to Portland's disused railway track, are both important features for migrating birds arriving or leaving via Portland, while the sheltered tall grass has become one of the best sites on island for glow-worms. A conservation team operates on the site, and stops the scrub from encroaching onto the grassland, particularly non-native plants like Cotoneaster horizontalis, as well as dealing with tree regeneration.

=== Wildlife ===
There are many species of butterfly to be seen in the reserve. Most notable is the silver-studded blue, which remains very abundant in the area, having established a colony on the limestone. Other butterfly species include small blue (seen in May/June and July/August), chalkhill blue (seen in July), dark green fritillary and Adonis blue. Grassland species include dingy skipper, small and large skipper, ringlet, meadow brown and marbled white, while there are migrant species such as the painted lady and clouded yellow. Moth species include the day-flying species six-spot burnet, four-spotted moth and cinnabar, as well as the night flying species Portland ribbon wave, beautiful gothic and valerian pug. Some of the many species of birds seen at the reserve include warblers and other migrants such as the green woodpecker, raven, peregrine falcon and kestrel.
