= Broadcroft Quarry =

Quarry in Dorset, England

Coordinates: 50.5468°N 2.4288°W

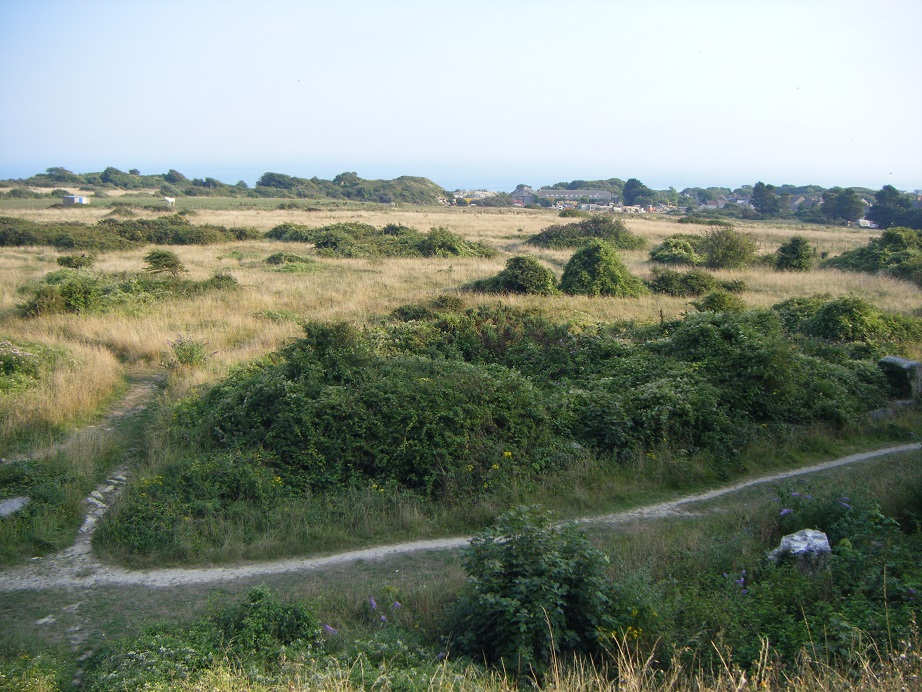
One area of the nature reserve at Broadcroft Quarry.

Broadcroft Quarry is an active stone quarry and part butterfly nature reserve located on the Isle of Portland, Dorset, England. It is located towards the eastern side of the island, where it lies to the east of the village Easton and close to The Grove village. The reserve section is now a valued home for a number of butterfly species, while the working quarry area is one of the largest active quarries on Portland and has supplied London with natural Portland stone for many years. The quarry is owned by Portland Stone Firms Ltd, along with Perryfield and Coombefield Quarries. The firm is the largest landholder on the island. The nature reserve is managed by Butterfly Conservation.

King Barrow Quarry, located close to the area of New Ground, in the north-east corner area of Tophill, is also another Portland nature reserve. Perryfield Quarry is also a part butterfly reserve. Broadcroft links with the now-redundant Yeolands Quarry, to the east, situated on the far eastern side of Portland.

== History ==
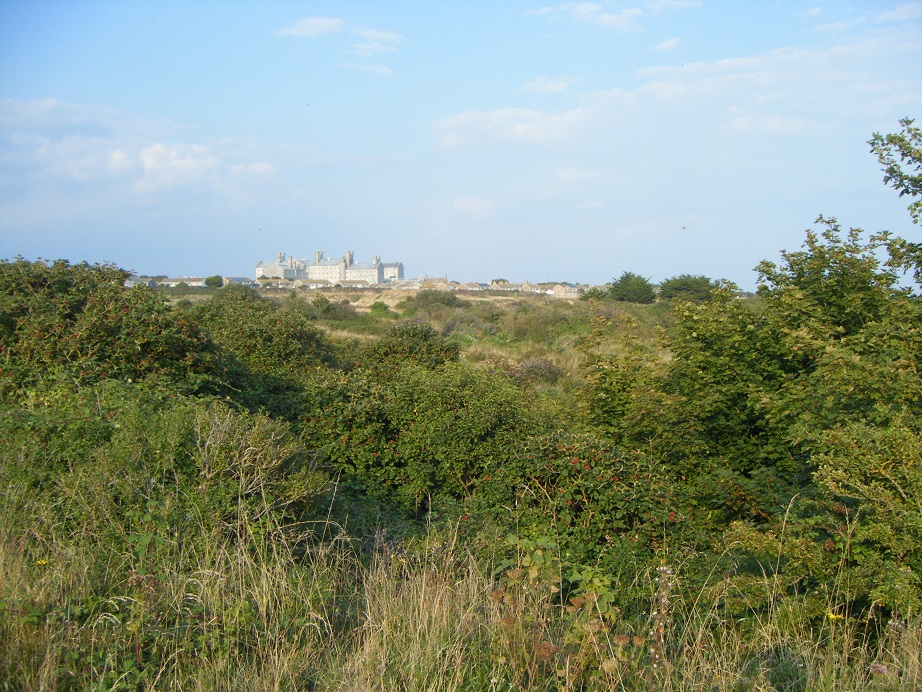
Part of the nature reserve with HM Prison Portland, a Young Offenders Institution in the distance.

Originally, Broadcroft Quarry had been worked for many years since the beginning of the 20th century in the form of a number of smaller individual family run quarries which eventually merged to form a large quarry. In the past quarrying for aggregate was undertaken below the dimension stone beds down to the Portland clay, where Broadcroft was the only area on Portland where the full stratigraphical column could be viewed.

Planning consent for modern day quarrying on Portland was granted in 1951, covering 324 hectares of the island. Portland Stone Firms Ltd received and still holds the planning consent for Coombefield, Perryfield and Broadcroft. In recent times, expansion into the north western area of Broadcroft is taking place to meet the rolling contract for Commonwealth War Graves Commission amongst other projects. The quarry has over 20 years of reserves left, which is privately owned by the stone firm, and as such is still being actively quarried. It is largely quarried for Broadcroft Whitbed stone.

=== Motorbiking use ===
On 13 November 2011, Portland Stone Firms Ltd held a Track 'n' Trail Enduro Event in the working part of the quarry. It was the first event of its kind and attracted many enthusiasts around the UK, many of which whom rated the contest as one of the toughest and most enjoyable in the UK afterwards. The Track 'n' Trails aim is to organise events to give youth and adult riders a safe and professionally organised way to enjoy the experience.

== Nature reserve ==
In recent years, an abandoned, infilled area of the quarry had become reclaimed by nature and wildlife. It became a designated nature reserve and is now known as Broadcroft Quarry Nature Reserve or Broadcroft Quarry and Butterfly Reserve. It has been leased by the Butterfly Conservation organisation from the quarry company owners since 1994. Spanning 7.3 hectares (18 acres), the project of restoring the area involved care in returning natural herb-rich flora and scrub to the landscape, which in turn brought many indigenous birds, butterflies and insects. The reserve now supports a wide array of wildlife, and is an example of how brownfield land can be managed for nature conservation. The reserve is part of Portland's Site of Special Scientific Interest (SSSI). Broadcroft is one of two nature reserves managed by Butterfly Conservation on Portland; the other, Perryfield Quarry, is close by and somewhat smaller, having become a reserve, four years after Broadcroft, in 1998.

The site's management provides open grassland and short sward conditions. With the use of innovative surface-scraping, the team management have re-recreated the conditions needed by the silver-studded blue butterfly and the black ants with which it is associated. In April–May 2011, a conservation team from Weymouth spent six weeks snipping, sawing and burning unwanted scrubby bushes at the nature reserve at Broadcroft Quarry in order to improve the habitats for butterflies and moths. The group also worked with a digger to scrape off the surface on part of the reserve to create the bare-ground habitat that the rare silver-studded blue butterfly needs to survive. The project was funded through the Awards for All strand of the Big Lottery. As a follow-up, Butterfly Conservation held a public event at Broadcroft Quarry over the first weekend of July to show visitors some of the butterflies and moths there.

=== Wildlife ===
The reserve features a wide range of plants and animals – mainly insects, also hosting flora and fauna specific to limestone soil. The stony, calcareous soil supports a herb-rich flora with local plants such as bee and pyramidal orchids, cyperus sedge, yellow vetchling, autumn gentian, tutsan, wild madder, tree-mallow, dwarf gorse and ivy broomrape. The quarry's sparse vegetation conditions hold the butterflies and other insects.

There are over twenty-four different species of butterfly to be seen in the reserve. Most notable is the silver-studded blue (seen in late June/early July), which remains very abundant in the area, having established a colony on the limestone. Some other butterfly species include small blue (seen in May/June and July/August), chalkhill blue (seen in July), a very strong population of the common blue (seen from May to September), while migrant species such as clouded yellow and painted lady have been seen in the area. Moth species include Portland ribbon wave, four-spotted moth, chalk carpet, beautiful gothic and valerian pug.

Aside from insects, which include the meadow grasshopper, migrant birds are also found in the area, either arriving or leaving via Portland. The scrub at the reserve provides shelter and habitat for them, although it also readily invades the open areas. Some bird species include whitethroat, lesser whitethroat, meadow pipit, kestrel, green woodpecker amongst other migrant birds. On occasion both roe deer and the herd of feral goats that help to graze the cliffs on East Weares may be seen in the area. On the eastern edge of the quarry are some ponds which hold various amphibian species. The ponds are some of the very few that can be found on Portland.
