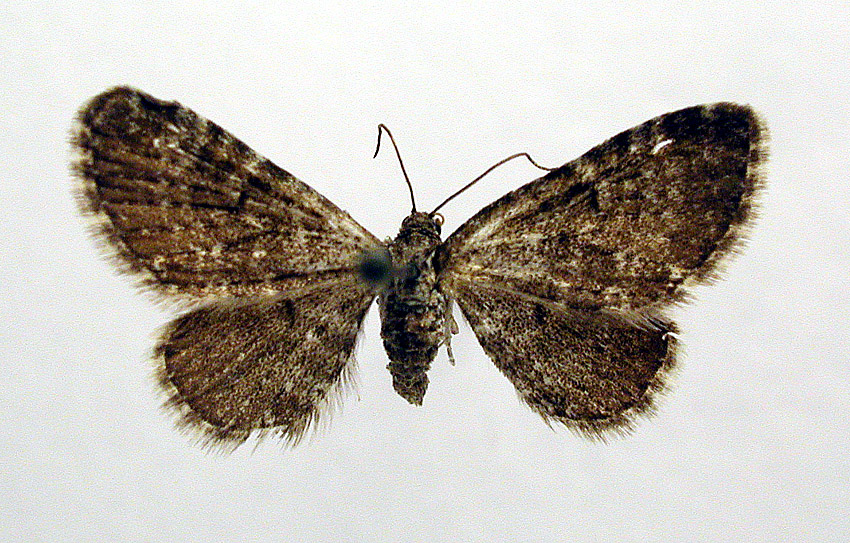

Scientific classification
- Domain: Eukaryota
- Kingdom: Animalia
- Phylum: Arthropoda
- Class: Insecta
- Order: Lepidoptera
- Family: Geometridae
- Genus: Eupithecia
- Species: E. pygmaeata

Binomial name
- Eupithecia pygmaeata (Hübner, 1799)

Synonyms
- Geometra pygmaeata Hubner, 1799; Eupithecia palustraria Doubleday, 1850; Eupithecia obumbrata Taylor, 1906; Eupithecia fortunata Pearsall, 1909; Eupithecia pygmaearia Boisduval, 1840; Eupithecia sidemii Vojnits, 1973

= Eupithecia pygmaeata =

Species of moth

Eupithecia pygmaeata, the marsh pug, is a moth of the family Geometridae. It is known from most of Europe, western and southern Siberia, the Russian Far East, northern Mongolia and North America (from Alaska to Newfoundland and Labrador and Quebec, south to Colorado).The species primarily colonizes floodplain and disused forests, bogs, river banks and marshy meadows. E. pygmaeata reaches up to 1800 meters in South Tyrol.

The wingspan is 14–18 mm. The ground colour of the forewings is dark smoky brown. Newly emerged moths have a coppery sheen. It is generally very weakly marked. The forewings have a small white dot at the inner angle and two dark spots at the costal edge. They are pointed not rounded. The hindwings are similar in colour and have a pale dot at the tornal margin. ab. pseudozibellinata Dietze is more copiously sprinkled with light scales.

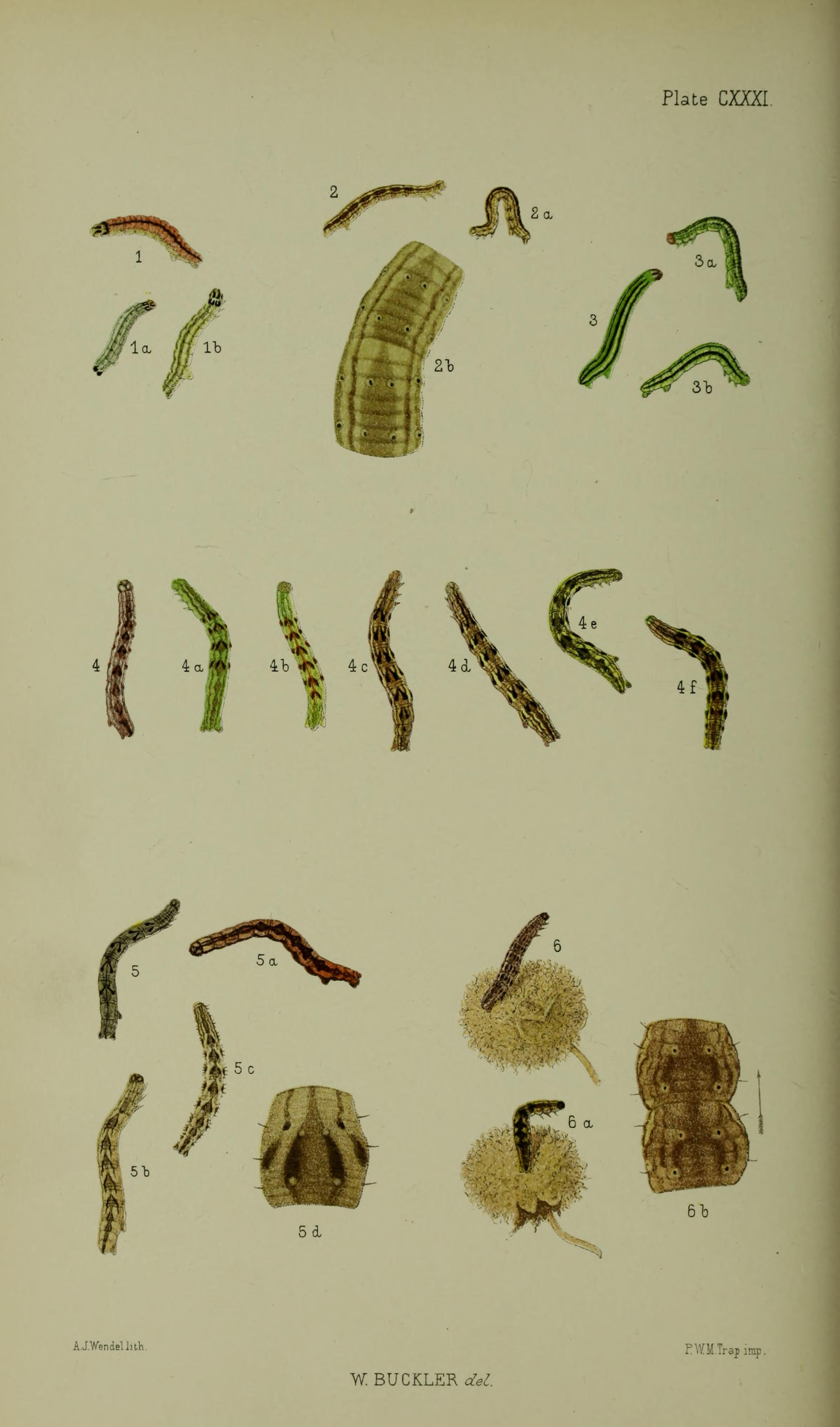
2,2a larvae after final moult 2b enlarged detail of segments

The caterpillars are greenish or light brown and show dark brown dorsal and lateral lines as well as loose short hair. The dorsal line is sometimes extended onto the segments. The pupa is brownish, the wing sheaths often shimmer slightly greenish. The cremaster is equipped with a total of eight hook bristles, the middle pair of which is more powerfully formed.

There are two generations per year with adults on wing from mid April to August.

The larvae feed on Cerastium and Stellaria species. Larvae can be found from June to September. It overwinters as a pupa.

== Subspecies ==
- Eupithecia pygmaeata pygmaeata
- Eupithecia pygmaeata obumbrata Taylor, 1906 (British Columbia)

== Similar species ==
- Eupithecia plumbeolata is brighter colored and lacks the white spot at the inner angle of the front wings.
- Eupithecia valerianata is light grey-brown and shows an elongated white spot at the inner angle of the front wings.
