= Jurassica =

Inactive Pre Historical Attraction

Coordinates: 50.5463°N 2.4213°W

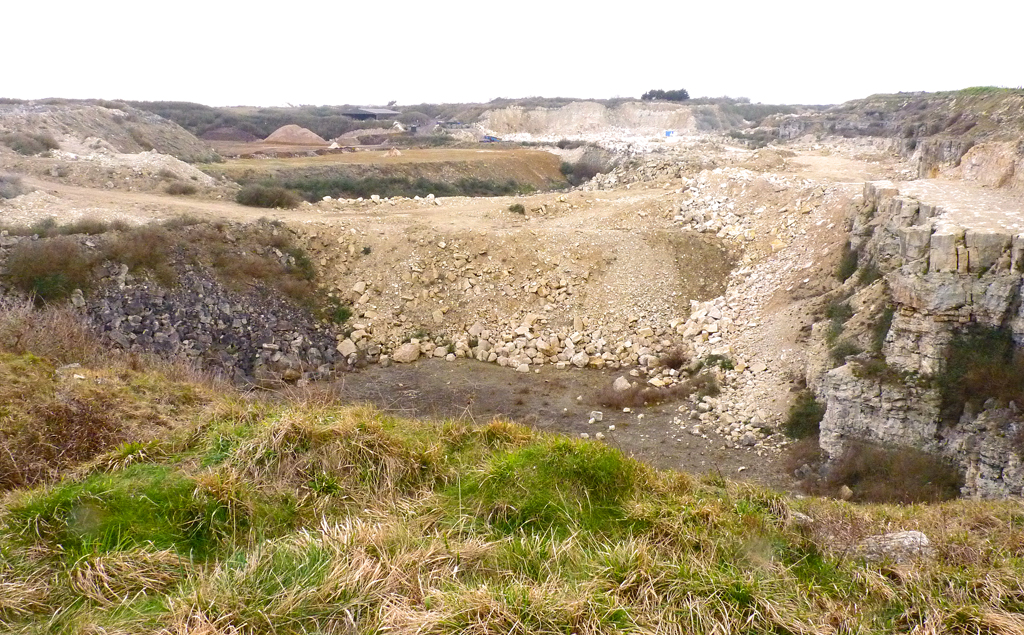
Yeolands Quarry – the proposed site of Jurassica.

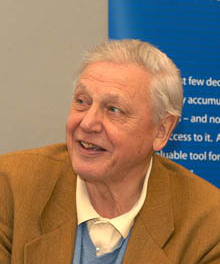
Sir David Attenborough, patron of Jurassica.

Jurassica was a planned visitor attraction in a disused quarry on the Isle of Portland, near Weymouth in Dorset, southern England. It was based on the Jurassic Coast, a World Heritage Site, and as a subterranean geological park, would have largely presented the prehistoric world. The attraction's location was chosen as Yeolands Quarry, a now disused quarry that was operational until the 21st century by Portland Stone Ltd. The quarry is 36 metres (120 ft) deep, 90 metres (300 ft) wide, and is on the eastern side of the island just south of The Grove village.

== Planned features ==
The £85–90 million project plans were unveiled in late 2013. Inspired by the Eden Project, which itself was built in an old clay pit in St. Austell, Cornwall, the attraction plans are to showcase hundreds of world-class paleontological remains, and these include dinosaurs, marine reptiles, marine invertebrates and plants. An aquarium is planned to be a part of the attraction, and other ideas include building aquatic tanks filled with animatronic models of prehistoric sea monsters. Other schemes involve taking visitors back in time, 140 million years ago, on a journey "flying around the Earth". The park has been described as about a third of the size of the Millennium Dome, and will be covered with a translucent, domed glass and steel roof spanning 350 ft, which has been described as a "unique, lightweight translucent roof, much like a spider web, that will be almost invisible from outside". The site is also planned to be the world's first carbon negative large visitor attraction, using solar panels to generate its own power, as well as reviving the park and ride scheme that was available during the 2012 Olympics within Weymouth and Portland area. Portland is being seen as ideal site at the centre of the Jurassic Coast, England's first natural World Heritage Site. The project, if completed, is said to create 200 jobs for the local economy.

The idea of Jurassica first stemmed from science journalist Michael Hanlon, who grew up in Dorset and searched for fossils along the coast. The project has received both local and national support. Naturalist and broadcaster Sir David Attenborough has become a patron, as well as trustee Sir Tim Smit, the creator of the Eden Project. The initial sketches of the site have been created by Renzo Piano (architect of The Shard in London), whilst the site's engineering is being led by the team responsible for the Eden Project and the refurbishment of Sydney Opera House. Hanlon has been quoted that the idea is "very big and ambitious", and that the site will "aim to be a spectacular world-class visitor attraction", as well as an "educational and heritage-focused charitable trust, acting as a hub for the Jurassic Coast UNESCO World Heritage Site." Attenborough has stated "My own love of science began with fossils, and this period and area are so very, very important in history and for Britain itself. The area is one about which Britain can be very proud because it is the birthplace of paleontology. The pity has been that this area has lacked a single focus and this is what Jurassica could do."

Funding is being sought from sources such as the UK Heritage Lottery Fund and help is being sought from the Natural History Museum, London. Hanlon has revealed the project is "hoping for significant private investment". Michael Dixon, director of the Natural History Museum, had visited the proposed site in July, and has since been keen to take an active part in the project. He has announced "We will have some glass-cased objects, but we will also use the very latest technology, like animatronics, to make it a very exciting visit." In The Guardian newspaper, it was announced by Hanlon in late December 2013 that the idea of the theme park had grown thanks to the support of "chance encounters" with leading scientists and business leaders. A possible partnership agreement with the Natural History Museum will include loans of Jurassic-related objects, whilst the idea has also been discussed with the Royal Society and with Kokoro, the Japanese technology company that provided the animatronics for the museum's dinosaur gallery. By this point, the project has also gained further support from more than 60 Dorset businesses, after attending a presentation evening by Hanlon in Bournemouth. In 2015, National Lottery funding was not secured.

The construction time of the project is estimated to be three to five years and if funding can be secured, the project's trustees are currently aiming to open the attraction in 2019–20. The plans are to attract 700,000 visitors a year. Hanlon has suggested that the price for two adults and two children could cost up to £70. One possible problem recognised by the scheme's proponents is transport, however buses from a large car park built to handle crowds going to Weymouth for the Olympics sailing in 2012 is one idea being considered. In relation to the Jurassica project, another related Portland project is the Mass Extinction Monitoring Observatory, a planned monument to the planet's perished creatures, which would be located on the west side of the island at Bowers Quarry.

== See also ==
- Eden Project
- Jurassic
- Jurassic Park
- Portland Museum
- Portland stone
