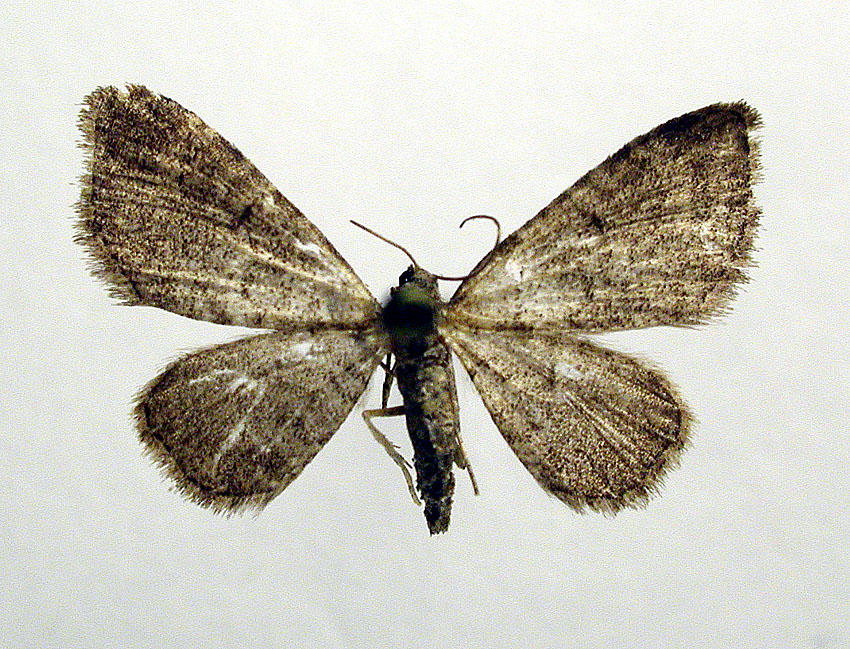

Scientific classification
- Domain: Eukaryota
- Kingdom: Animalia
- Phylum: Arthropoda
- Class: Insecta
- Order: Lepidoptera
- Family: Geometridae
- Genus: Eupithecia
- Species: E. plumbeolata

Binomial name
- Eupithecia plumbeolata (Haworth, 1809)

Synonyms
- Phalaena plumbeolata Haworth, 1809; Eupithecia begrandaria Boisduval, 1840; Eupithecia dshungarica Viidalepp, 1988; Larentia isogrammata Treitschke, 1828; Eupithecia singularia Herrich-Schaffer, 1848; Eupithecia lutosaria Bohatsch, 1893

= Eupithecia plumbeolata =

Species of moth

Eupithecia plumbeolata, the lead-coloured pug, is a moth of the family Geometridae. The species can be found all over Europe ranging to the Urals, then through Central Asia to Siberia and to Sayan mountains, the Altai and the Amur. In the Alps, the species occurs up 2000 metres above sea level and in the Pyrenees up to in 2400 metres.

The wingspan is 14–15 mm. The ground color of both forewings and hindwings is grey-brown to lead. All wings have alternating light and dark cross lines. These are weaker on the rear wings. Discal flecks have been identified. The abdomen is grey to grey-brown. The larva is grey-yellow with two red dorsal stripes.

Depending on the location, the moth flies from May to June.

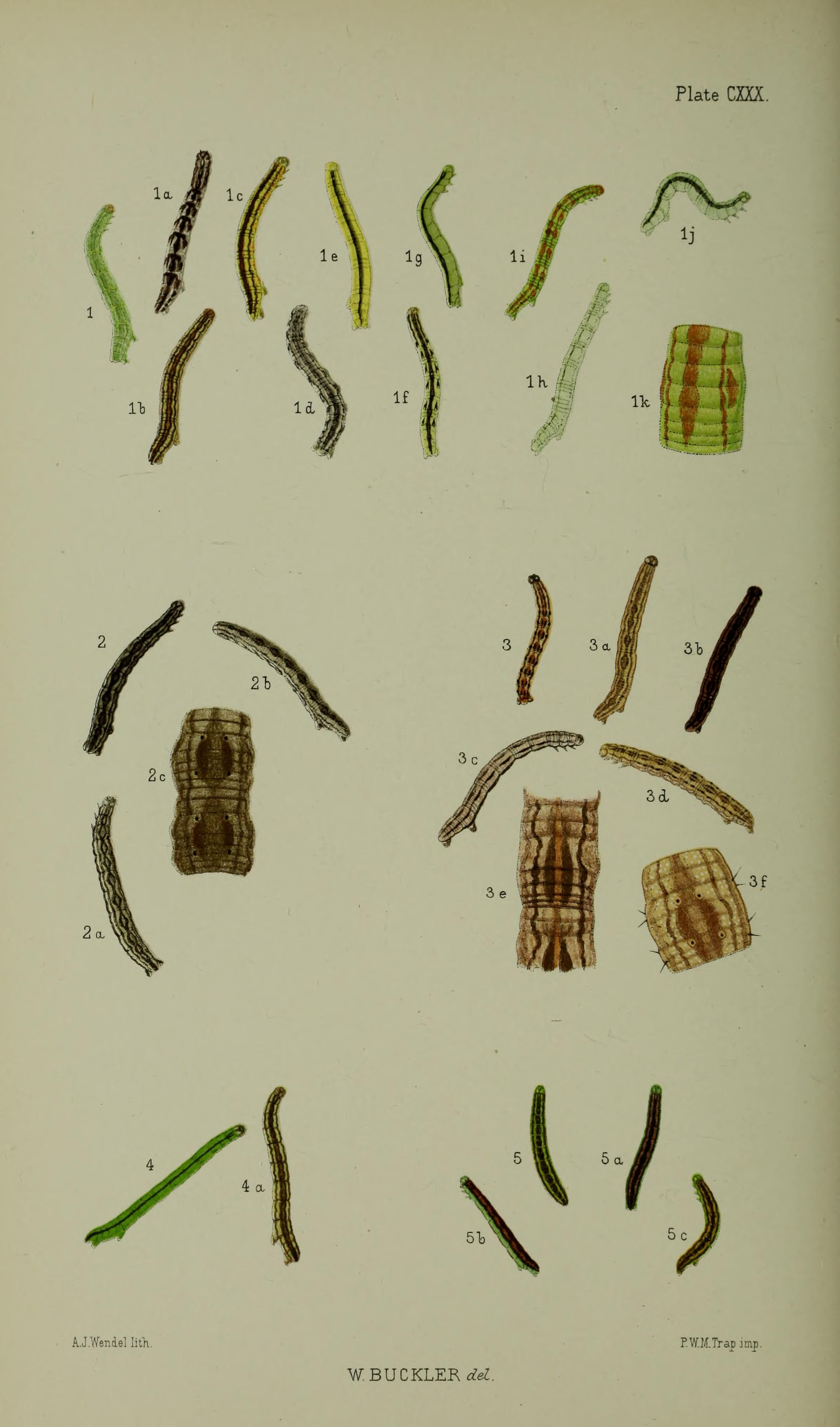
Figs 5,5a,5b,5c larvae after final moult

The larvae feed on Melampyrum pratense.

The species preferably inhabits light forests, forest edges, as well as hedge and bushes landscapes.

== Subspecies ==
- Eupithecia plumbeolata plumbeolata
- Eupithecia plumbeolata lutosaria Bohatsch, 1893 Ukraine, to Asia minor, the Caucasus and in Georgia.

== Similar species ==
- Eupithecia haworthiata
- Eupithecia valerianata
- Eupithecia pygmaeata
