= Stonehills Mine =

Stone mine on the Isle of Portland in the United Kingdom

Stonehills Mine is the first completely new mine on Portland (not a mine as an extension from an existing quarry). Albion Stone Plc began the process to open this mine began in 2015 and reserves are estimated to last for 50 years (2066). The planning application to begin work on Stonehills was submitted to the Dorset County Council in February 2001 and was finally approved in February 2005. The site is owned by the Crown Estate and the leased by Albion Stone plc who extract Portland Stone Whitbed and Portland Stone Basebed. Albion Stone Plc use room and pillar mining method of extraction which is already being carried out in their Jordans mine and Bowers Mine.

Stonehills has been broken down into three phases to reach the suitable stone underneath. Phase one involves mainly preparations of the excavation site, including the removal of the top soil and overburden. Prior to the commencements of works Albion Stone ensured all necessary steps were taken; all ecologist surveys have been conducted and an archaeologist is in attendance for all site stripping at all times. Phase one was delayed due to the potential high levels of breeding activity of Skylarks nearby. Albion Stone are very conscious about their operations on the local environment and the Crown Estate recognised this with a business award in 2013.

Phase two is the extraction of the cap stone in front of the main portals to Stonehills Mine. After the extraction of all rubble/overburden in autumn 2015, the remaining Cap, Roach and whitbed is extracted to create a level working area inferno of the mine portals.

Phase three is cutting the Whitbed on the face of the wall to form the portals for the mine so the extraction of Stonehills Whitbed and Stonehills Basebed can commence.

Albion stone Plc have planted approximately 500 trees and shrubs around the mine to increase the biodiversity of the site.

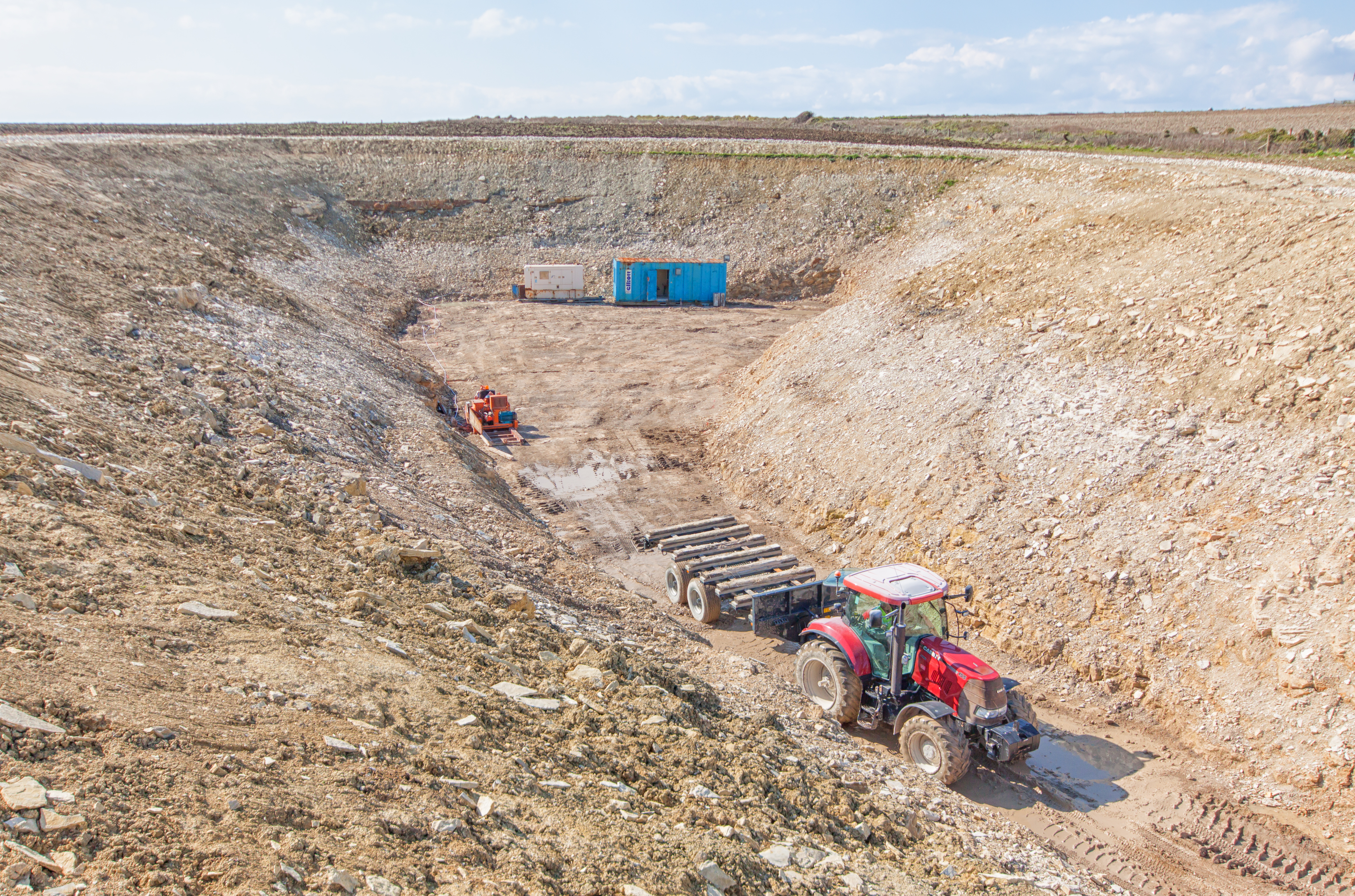
Stonehills Mine

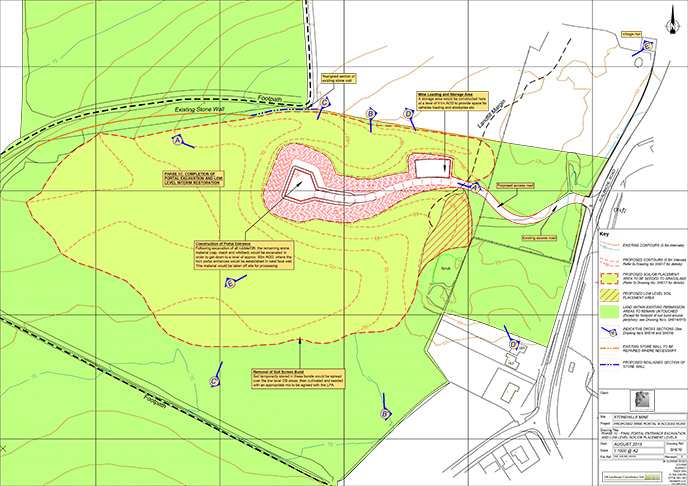
