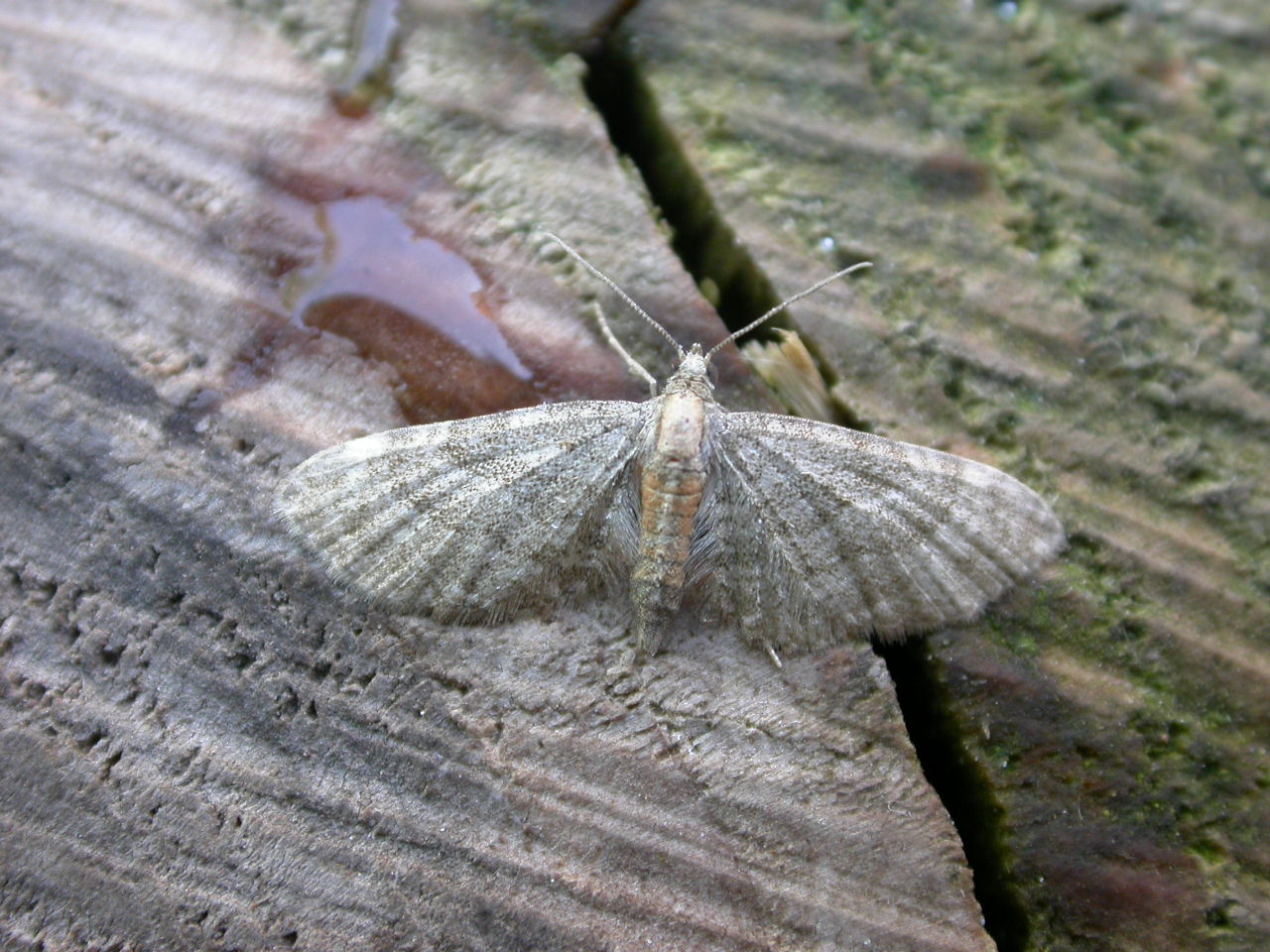

Scientific classification
- Kingdom: Animalia
- Phylum: Arthropoda
- Class: Insecta
- Order: Lepidoptera
- Family: Geometridae
- Genus: Eupithecia
- Species: E. haworthiata

Binomial name
- Eupithecia haworthiata Doubleday, 1856

Synonyms
- Eupithecia isogrammaria Herrich-Schaffer, 1848; Tephroclystia transsylvanaria Dannehl, 1933; Eupithecia gozmanyi Vojnits, 1972

= Eupithecia haworthiata =

Species of moth

Eupithecia haworthiata, or Haworth's pug, is a moth of the family Geometridae. The species was first described by Henry Doubleday in 1856. It can be found in western, south and central Europe, Asia Minor, the Caucasus and east across the Palearctic to Amur. It occurs in the Alps up to 1800 meters, in the Apennines up to 1400 metres and in the Balkan mountains up to 1500 m above sea level.

The wingspan is 12–14 mm. The ground colour of the forewings is grey brown. The crosslines are in pairs. A central spot is missing. There is a faint discal stain on the hindwings. The colour of the first abdominal segments is strongly yellow, orange or reddish.

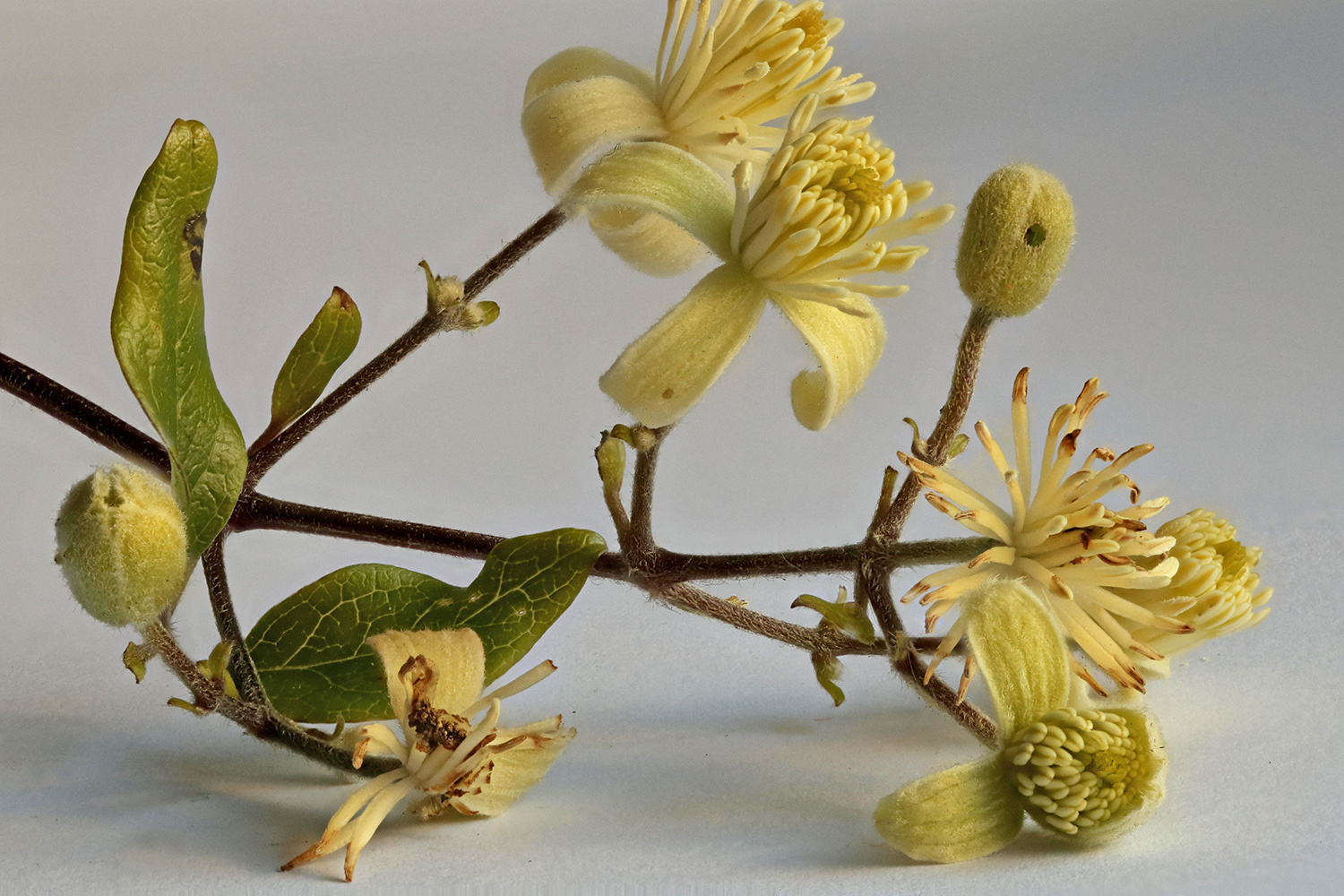
Haworth's Pug bud, Glaslyn Marsh, North Wales, Sept 2015 The larva feeds in the flowerbuds of Clematis, easily detected by the round hole which it makes.

The moths flies from April to August depending on the location.

The caterpillars feed on Clematis vitalba and cultivated Clematis species. The pupa hibernates and often 2 or even 3 winters are passed in this state.

== Subspecies ==
- Eupithecia haworthiata haworthiata
- Eupithecia haworthiata transsylvanaria (Dannehl, 1933)

== Similar species ==
- Eupithecia plumbeolata
- Eupithecia valerianata

but neither of these have a reddish or yellow tinge to the basal segments of the abdomen.
