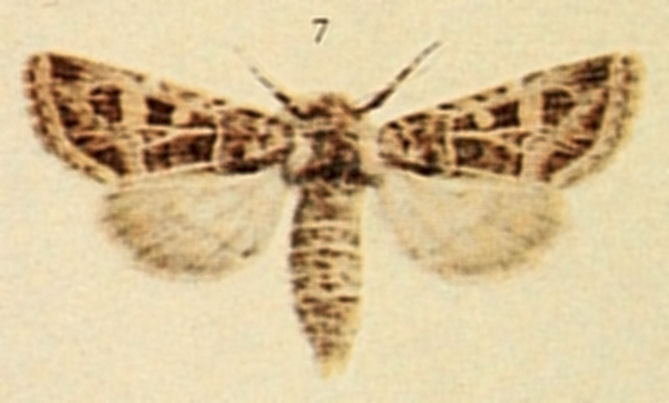

Scientific classification
- Kingdom: Animalia
- Phylum: Arthropoda
- Class: Insecta
- Order: Lepidoptera
- Superfamily: Noctuoidea
- Family: Noctuidae
- Subfamily: Cuculliinae
- Genus: Leucochlaena; Hampson, 1906

= Leucochlaena =

Genus of moths

Leucochlaena is a genus of moths of the family Noctuidae.

== Species ==
- Leucochlaena aenigma Pinhey, 1968
- Leucochlaena fallax (Staudinger, 1870)
- Leucochlaena hirsuta (Staudinger, 1891)
- Leucochlaena hoerhammeri (Wagner, 1931)
- Leucochlaena leucocera (Hampson, 1894)
- Leucochlaena muscosa (Staudinger, 1891)
- Leucochlaena oditis (Hübner, [1822])
- Leucochlaena seposita Turati, 1919
- Leucochlaena turatii (Schawerda, 1931)
