= Yeolands Quarry =

Formerly active quarry in Dorset, England

Coordinates: 50.5462°N 2.4239°W

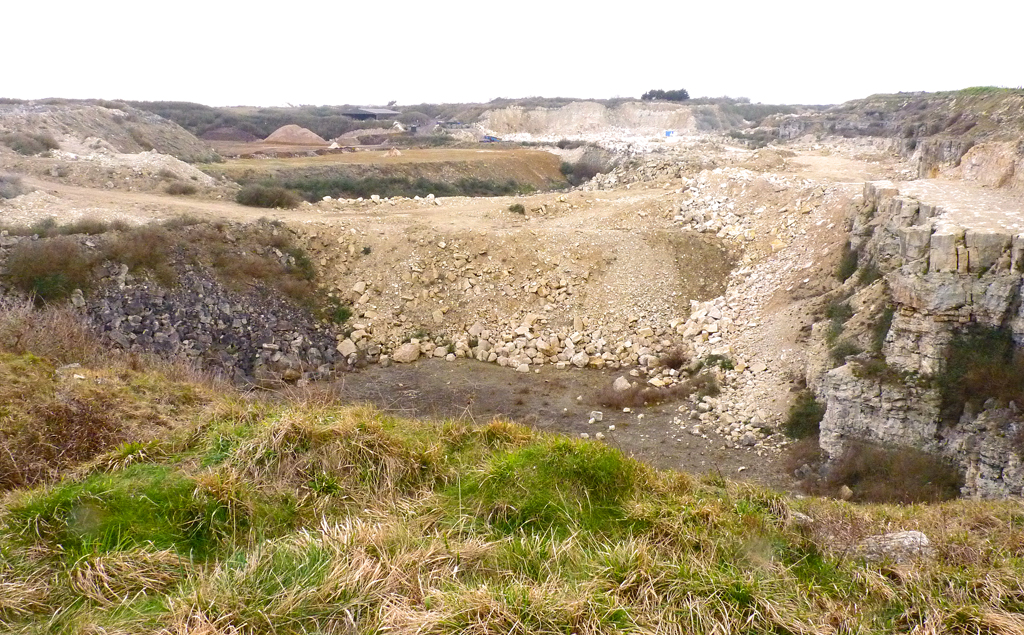
Yeolands Quarry

Yeolands Quarry is a disused stone quarry located on the Isle of Portland, Dorset, England. It is located on the eastern side of Portland, where it lies east of the village Easton and south of The Grove village. The quarry is one of the largest on Portland, at 120 feet (37 m) deep, 300 feet (91 m) wide. It is now abandoned for extracting stone, though the adjacent Broadcroft Quarry to the west, which links to Yeolands, is still in some use, as well as being a butterfly reserve.

Yeolands Quarry has been the planned setting for the visitor attraction Jurassica - which is to be based on the Jurassic Coast, a World Heritage Site, and as a subterranean geological park, will largely present the prehistoric world.

== Background ==
The quarry was in full use by Portland Stone Firms Ltd before becoming redundant in the 21st century. By the late 1980s the central bottom region of the quarry had an established ecosystem where small ponds were fed by rivulets. This environment hosted many types of reeds, grasses and even newts. However, from the 21st century the quarry was used for dumping overburden, and as such changed considerably, with the ecosystem buried deep under rubble.

The north-eastern face of the quarry has a clean, albeit partly overgrown, sequence of Portland Stone, both Cherty Series and Freestone. On the outskirts of the quarry are rough paths and tracks on the seaward side, which is popular for walking.

In late 2013 plans were revealed for the £85–90 million project Jurassica, which is planned to be set within Yeolands Quarry. The idea was created by Michael Hanlon, and inspired by the Eden Project. With plans to showcase hundreds of world-class paleontological remains, the project has received both local and national support. Naturalist and broadcaster Sir David Attenborough has become a patron, as well as trustee Sir Tim Smit, the creator of the Eden Project. The construction time of the project is estimated to be three to five years and if funding can be secured, the project's trustees are aiming to open the attraction in 2019–20. The plans are to attract 700,000 visitors a year.
