= King Barrow Quarry =

Disused quarry site

Coordinates: 50.5552°N 2.4360°W

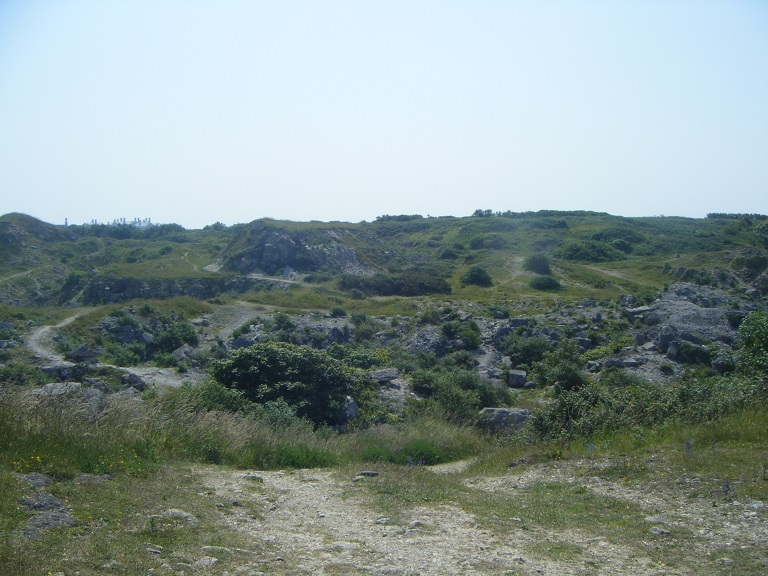
Overhead view of King Barrow Quarry, looking towards The Grove village area.

King Barrow Quarry is a disused site of former 19th century stone quarries on the Isle of Portland, Dorset, England. It is located in the north-east corner of Tophill. The quarry, now a Dorset Wildlife Trust nature reserve, covers 12.2 hectares. Both King Barrow and the nearby Tout Quarry make up the Dorset Wildlife Trust's Portland Quarries Nature Park. Portland also has two butterfly reserves: Broadcroft Quarry and Perryfield Quarry.

== History and Nature Reserve status ==
The site is based on former quarries that were abandoned 100 years ago. In the nineteenth century there was extensive quarrying in the area. When the area was first quarried, huge numbers of Roman artifacts were discovered. Since being abandoned the area had been left to regenerate naturally, with the aid of scrub management.

Since around 2004 the quarry became a nature reserve after the site owners handed the quarry over to the Dorset Wildlife Trust. The quarry then became known as King Barrow Quarries Nature Reserve.

Within the quarry are relics of past industrial activities, including blocks of cut stone and a quarryman's shelter. Pieces of tramway track and a tunnel remain from the horse-drawn tramway that had transported the stone to the Merchant's Railway.

== Wildlife ==
The quarry's rocky slopes, grassy pockets and sheltered gullies are all havens for wildlife, and therefore features a wide range of plants and animals, hosting flora and fauna specific to limestone soil. Described as one of Portland's prime nature habitats, the thin limestone soils have been slowly colonised by a variety of wildflowers. King Barrow Quarries is particularly known for its blue butterflies and bird species.
