= Coombefield Quarry =

Stone quarry on the Isle of Portland, Dorset, England

Coordinates: 50.5340°N 2.4382°W

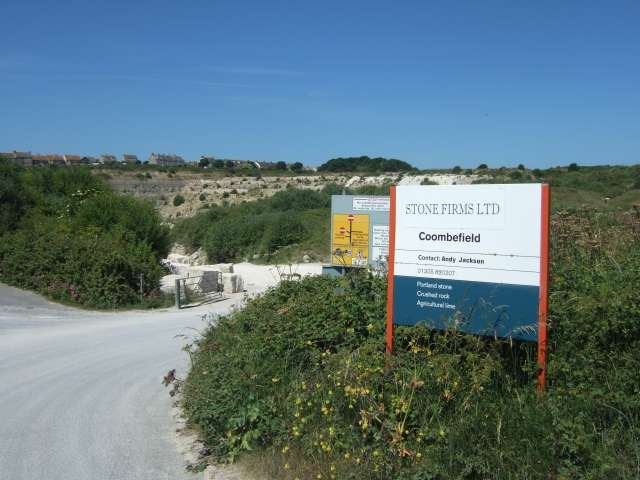
The entrance to Coombefield Quarry

Coombefield Quarry is an active stone quarry located on the Isle of Portland, Dorset, England. It is situated near the island's southernmost village Southwell. The large quarry has been worked over many years, and has two voids known as Coombefield North and Coombefield South. The quarry today incorporates the former Suckthumb Quarry, which is situated at the northwest part of the quarry, and is now filled in. The quarry is owned by Portland Stone Firms Ltd, along with Broadcroft and Perryfield Quarry. The firm is the largest landholder on the island.

== History ==
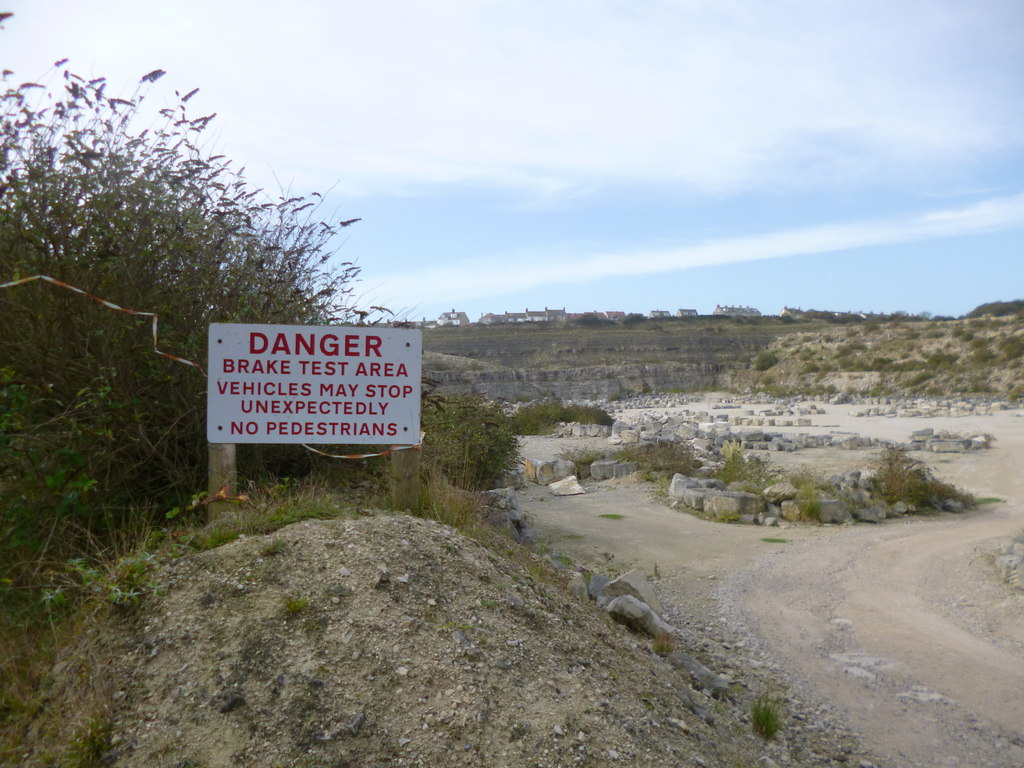
Coombefield Quarry

Coombefield Quarry was first quarried during the 1890s, and has been open cast quarried over the last 80 years. It has good sections of Portland Freestone. The quarry has continued to expand through to the 21st century into neighbouring fields. Today a small reserve is located at Coombefield South, while Coombefield North has ceased economic quarrying. Coombefield South also holds a stock of dimension stone blocks. Coombefield is largely quarried for Coombefield Shelly Whitbed, Whitbed and XE.

In 2009 national news was made when a 135-million-year-old fossilised dinosaur footprint was stolen from the quarry. The print was chiselled out of a limestone slab, which had been unearthed by quarrying in 2002. The quarry is nearing the end of its working life and since 2006 the owners had looked at schemes for the quarry. In 2012 plans were unveiled for the quarry to be regenerated as a holiday caravan park to boost local tourism on the island. The £3-5million holiday park and leisure complex would include 250 static caravans, 110 holiday lodges and 35 camping pods, and the plans also include leisure facilities.
