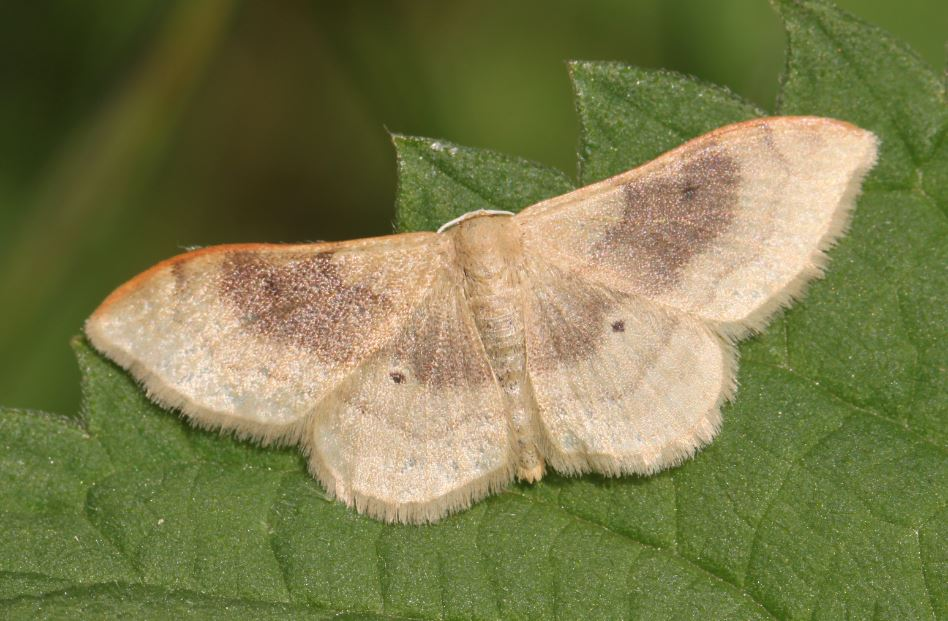
- Dorsal view

Scientific classification
- Kingdom: Animalia
- Phylum: Arthropoda
- Clade: Pancrustacea
- Class: Insecta
- Order: Lepidoptera
- Family: Geometridae
- Genus: Idaea
- Species: I. degeneraria

Binomial name
- Idaea degeneraria (Hübner, 1799)

= Idaea degeneraria =

Portland ribbon wave

Species of moth

Idaea degeneraria, the Portland ribbon wave, is a moth of the family Geometridae. The species was first described by Jacob Hübner in 1799.

== Subspecies ==
In alphabetical order:

- Idaea degeneraria alticolaria (Schawerda, 1933)
- Idaea degeneraria degeneraria (Hubner, 1800)
- Idaea degeneraria erschoffi (Christoph, 1872)

== Description ==
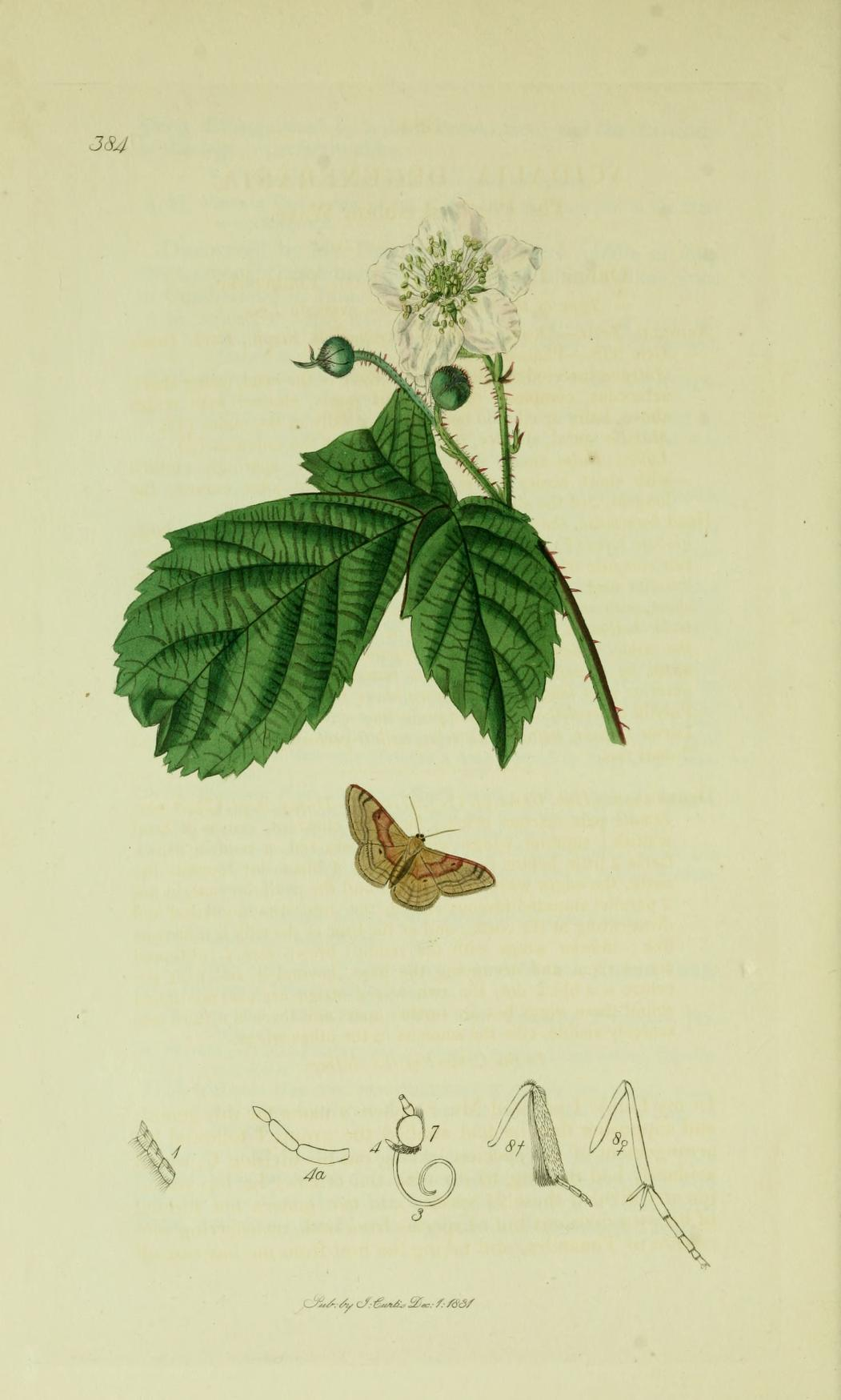
Illustration from John Curtis's British Entomology Volume 6

The species has a wingspan of 26–31 mm. These small pale brown geometers are darker brown-marked between antemedian and median lines.

== Biology ==
The larvae feed on various low herbaceous plants, mainly dandelion (Taraxacum species) and knotgrass (Polygonum species). The adults fly in one generation from June to July.

== Distribution ==
This species can be found in most of Europe, in the Near East and in North Africa. These moths prefer warm limestone undercliffs.

== Notes ==
1. The flight season refers to the British Isles. This may vary in other parts of its range.
