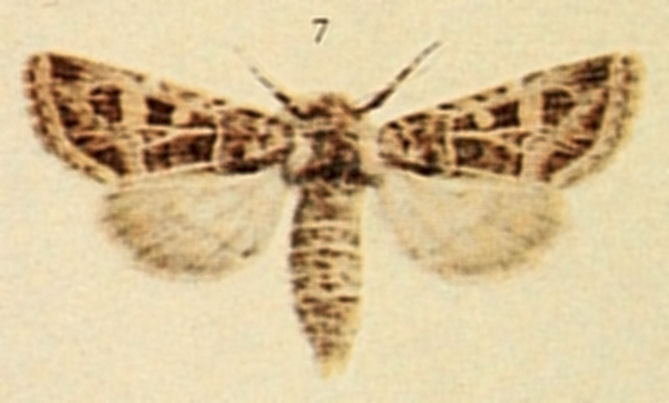

Scientific classification
- Kingdom: Animalia
- Phylum: Arthropoda
- Clade: Pancrustacea
- Class: Insecta
- Order: Lepidoptera
- Superfamily: Noctuoidea
- Family: Noctuidae
- Genus: Leucochlaena
- Species: L. oditis

Binomial name
- Leucochlaena oditis (Hübner, 1822)

Synonyms
- Noctua oditis Hübner, 1822; Noctua hispida Geyer, 1832; Leucochlaena machlyum Turati, 1924

= Leucochlaena oditis =

Species of moth

The Beautiful Gothic (Leucochlaena oditis) is a Palearctic moth of the family Noctuidae, sub-family Cuculliinae. It is found in southern Europe and north Africa, with occasional finds on the southern coast of England.

== Technical description and variation ==
L. oditis Hbn. (= hispida H. G., pilosa Bsd., hirta Dup. nec Hbn.) (29 c). Forewing deep olive brown: all the veins whitish; inner and outer lines broadly whitish with a dark line in centre, the first outwardly oblique, the outer outcurved above and oblique below middle, emitting pale tooth-shaped marks along veins to submarginal line which is broad, whitish internally and rufous or brownish externally, toothed between the black marginal lunules; the line is preceded by black wedge-shaped blotches lying between the teeth of outer line; claviform stigma brown, black-edged; upper stigmata pale ochreous, finely outlined with black, the orbicular with the centre reddish; fringe with basal half brown, outer half ochreous; hindwing dull whitish, becoming brownish grey towards termen, with a dark outer line; specimens from the chalk at Portland [South England] are much paler and constitute the aberrations pallida Tutt and obsoleta Tutt; the former pale grey with a faint brown tinge; the costa whitish; the broad submarginal line white like the fringe; hindwing and fringe almost wholly white; the latter is dull grey with scarcely any paler markings; ab. hispanica ab. nov. (29 c, d) differs in being smaller, yellowerbrown, with all lines, veins, and markings ochreous, not white, except the inner linear edge of the submarginal line; it in distinguished at once by the lower half of outer line being vertical instead of oblique, in a straight line with the inner edge of the reniform. Larva yellowish green or brownish; dorsal and subdorsal lines pale with dark edges; spiracular line broad, yellowish white. The wingspan is 28–36 mm

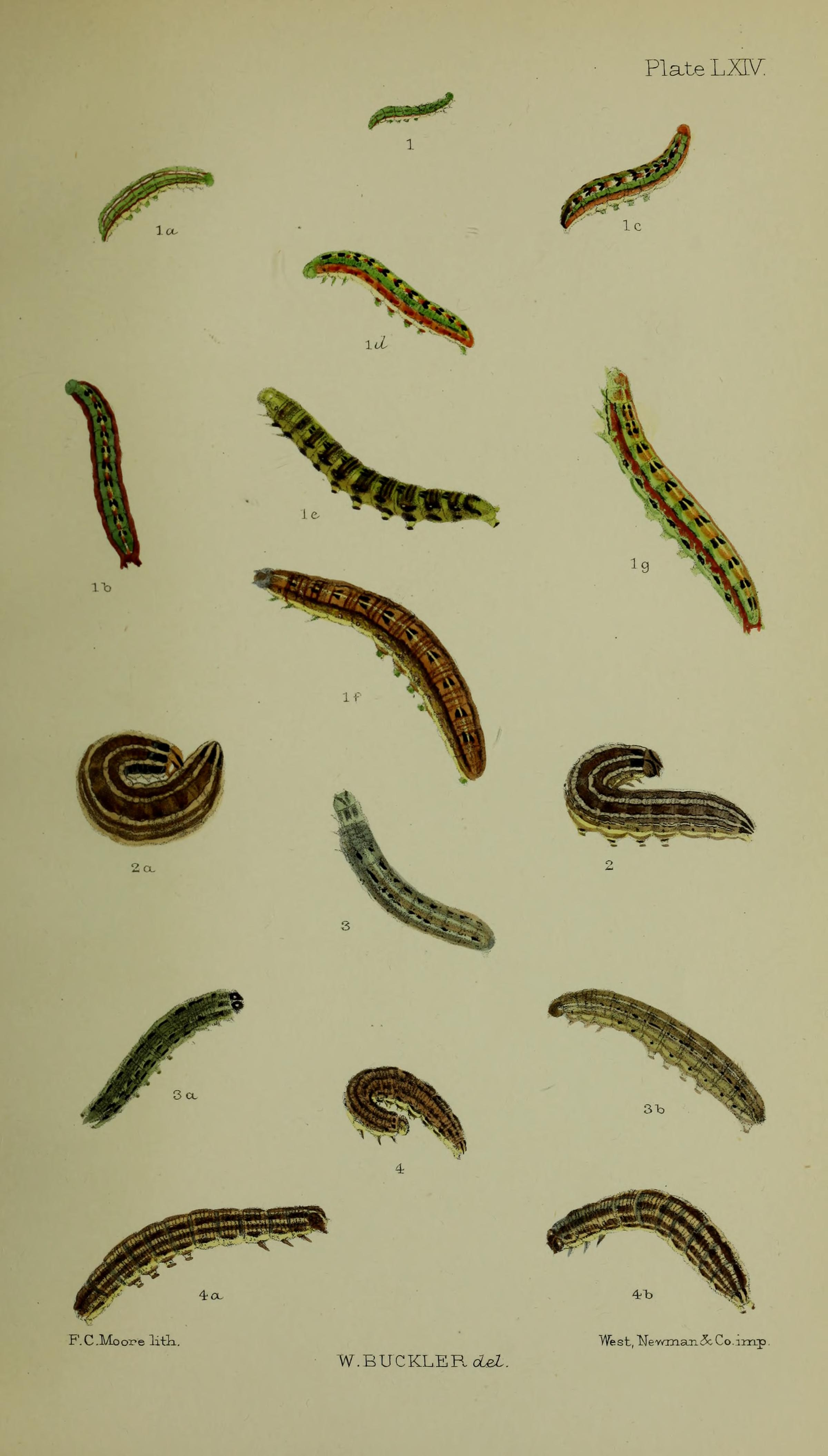
Figs 3, 3a, 3b larva after last moult

== Biology ==
The moth flies in September and October.

The larvae feed on grasses.
