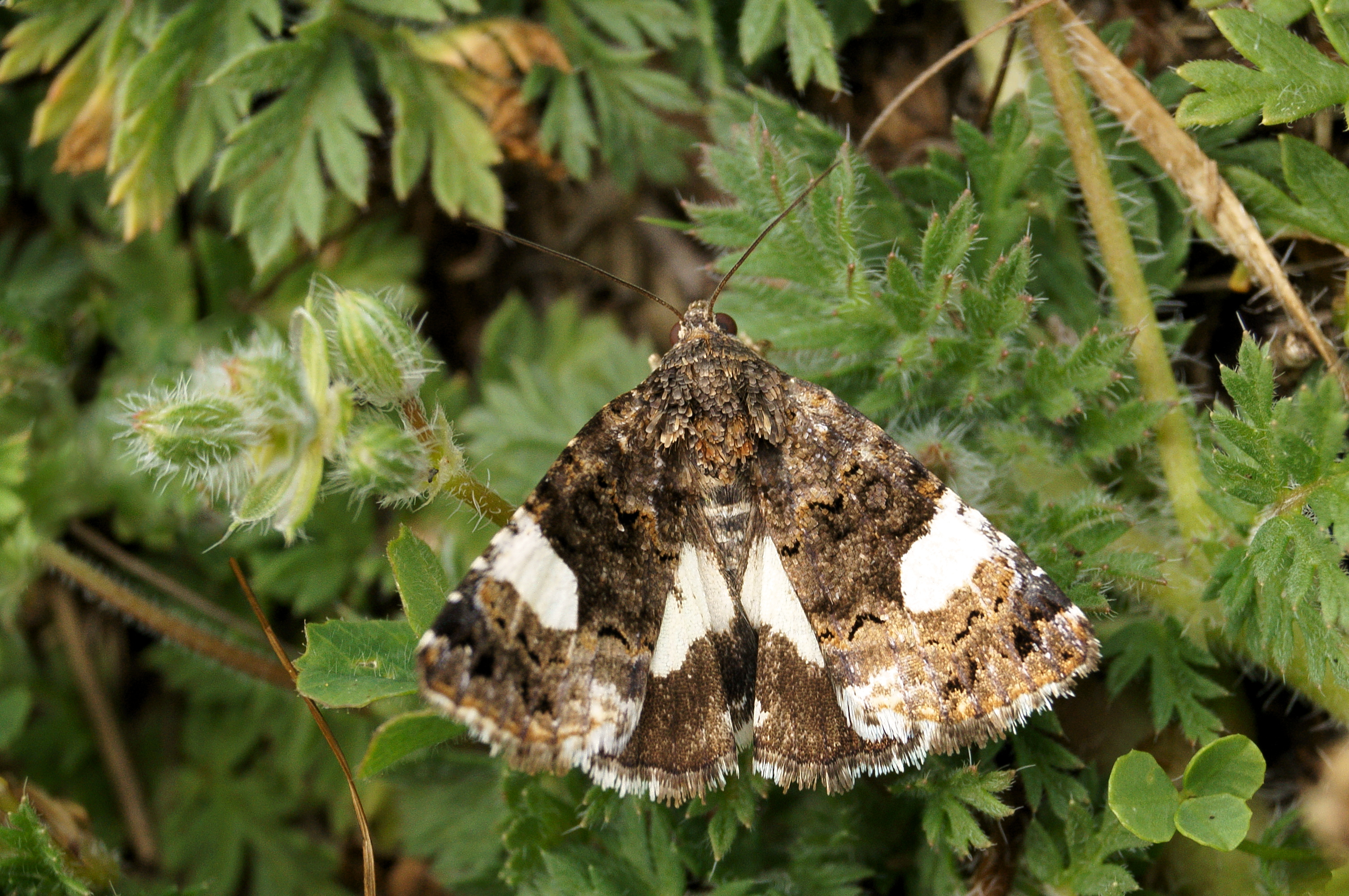

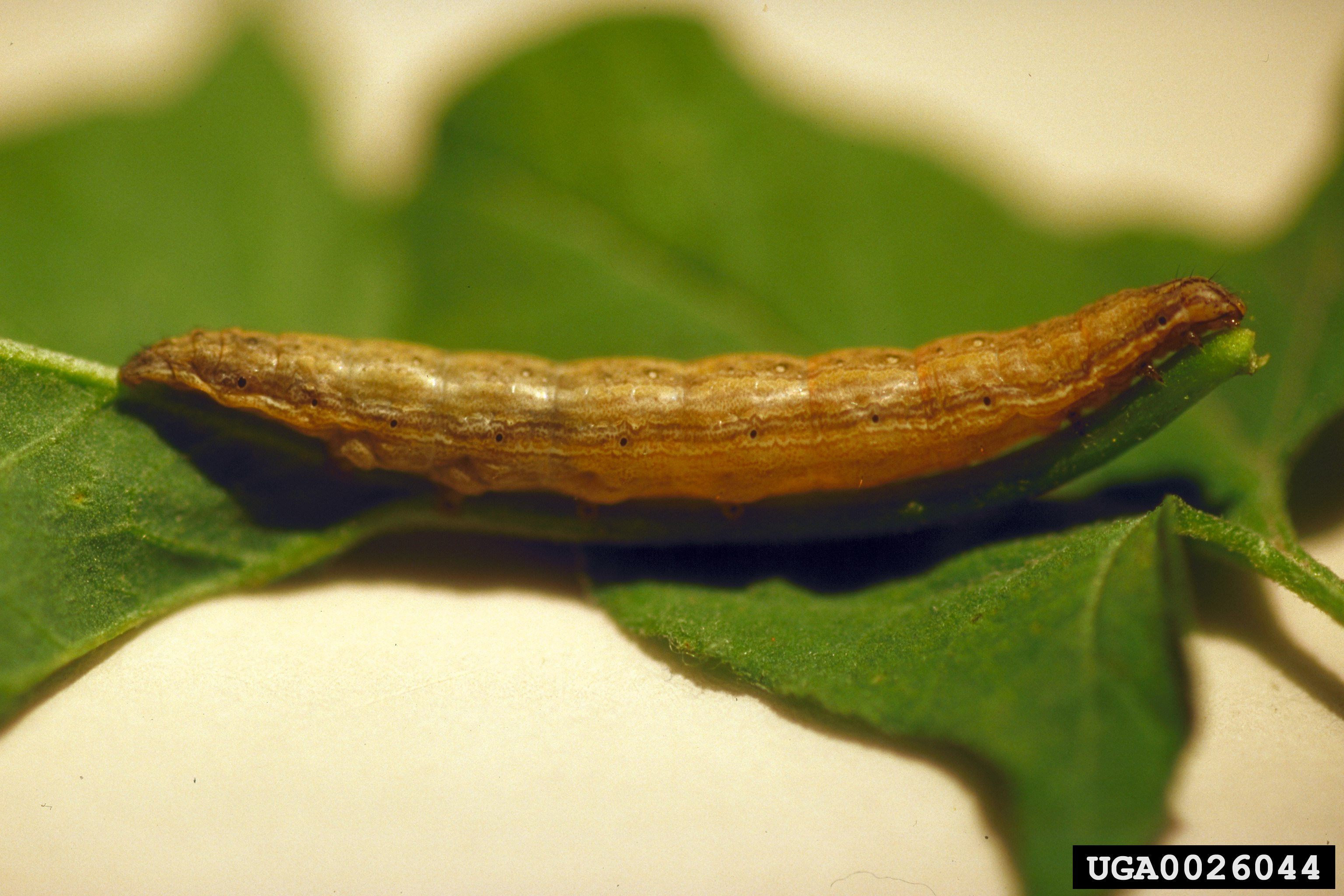
- Adult (top) and larva (bottom)

Scientific classification
- Kingdom: Animalia
- Phylum: Arthropoda
- Clade: Pancrustacea
- Class: Insecta
- Order: Lepidoptera
- Superfamily: Noctuoidea
- Family: Noctuidae
- Subfamily: Aediinae
- Genus: Tyta; Billberg, 1820
- Species: T. luctuosa

Binomial name
- Tyta luctuosa (Denis & Schiffermüller, 1775)

Synonyms
- Dysthymia Newman, 1868

= Tyta =

Tyta luctuosa

Genus of moths

Tyta is a genus of noctuid ('owlet') moths that was erected by Gustaf Johan Billberg in 1820. It is monotypic, being represented by the single species Tyta luctuosa, commonly known as four-spotted moth and field bindweed moth. The species was first described by Michael Denis and Ignaz Schiffermüller in 1775.

This moth is native to much of the Palearctic – most of Europe east to the Caucasus, Kazakhstan and from Siberia to China and south to North Africa. The adult moth is about eleven millimeters long and dark brown with one large white spot on each of its four wings.

== Technical description and variation ==
Its forewings are purplish fuscous, becoming paler, and more brownish, towards the termen, and sometimes at the extreme base; the lines black, fine; the inner oblique, thrice waved; the outer excurved above middle, incurved below; subterminal line pale, preceded by a darker shade; fringe white with a dark patch below middle; an abbreviated white band from costa to vein 3 beyond cell, sometimes tinged with tannish peach; hindwing with a white median band of varying width; in ab. angustifascia ab. nov. this band is greatly restricted and sometimes interrupted; the examples in which the white costal blotch of forewing is tinged with flesh colour constitute the ab. ochracea Tutt. The larvae are grey, sometimes reddish grey and darker at the sides; hues pale with dark edges somewhat interrupted; spiracular line dark brown, pale edge; beneath; subspiracular reddish brown; face ochreous grey with rows of small dark dots. The first two pairs of prolegs are shorter than usual.

== Biology ==
Two adult generations emerge each year, one in late spring and one in summer. In warm areas there is often a third generation. The female lays about 400 to 500 eggs. The larva is a brown caterpillar. The larva is the destructive stage. It eats leaves and flowers, especially new buds. This is the desired effect of this moth when it is used as an agent of biological pest control against field bindweed (Convolvulus arvensis). It was first introduced into the United States in the 1980s to attack this agricultural weed, which is its main food plant.
