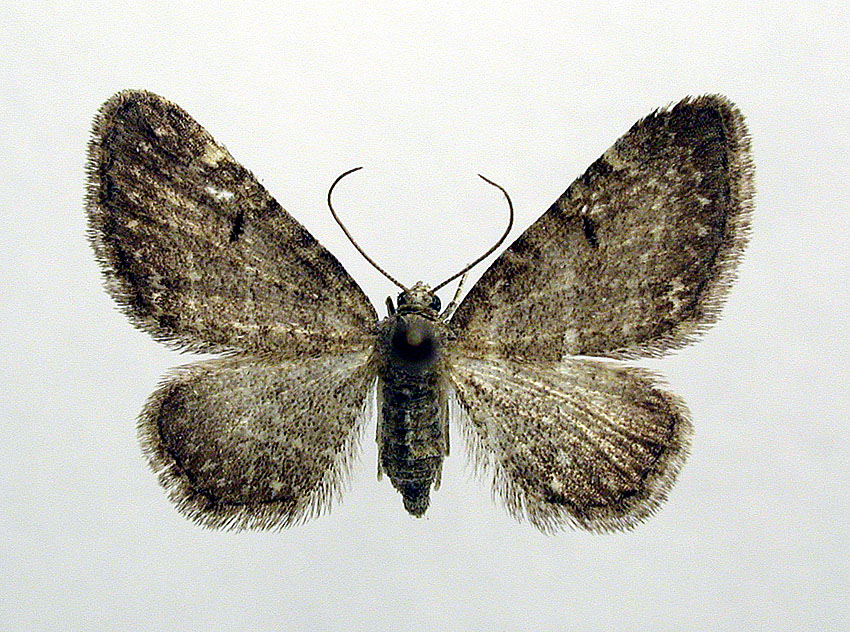

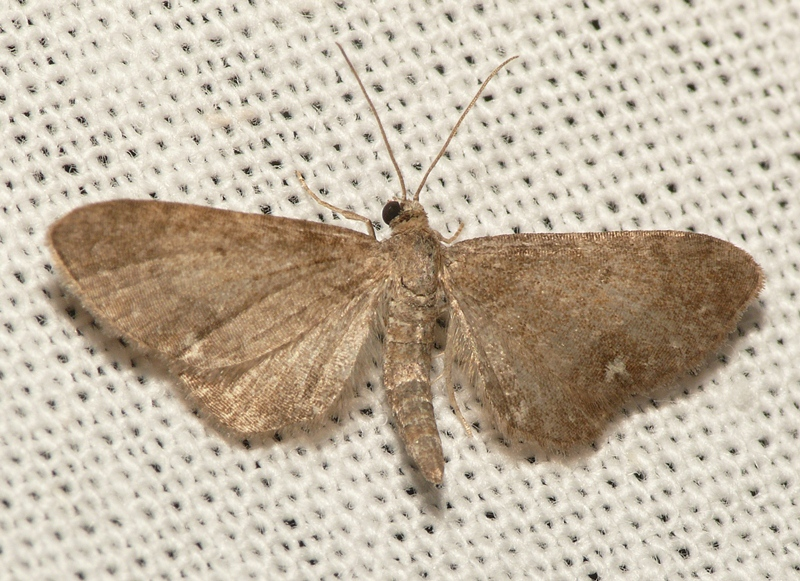

Scientific classification
- Kingdom: Animalia
- Phylum: Arthropoda
- Clade: Pancrustacea
- Class: Insecta
- Order: Lepidoptera
- Family: Geometridae
- Genus: Eupithecia
- Species: E. valerianata

Binomial name
- Eupithecia valerianata (Hübner, 1813)

Synonyms
- Geometra valerianata Hübner, 1813; Eupithecia laevilignata Bruand, 1850; Eupithecia viminata Doubleday, 1858

= Eupithecia valerianata =

Species of moth

Eupithecia valerianata, the valerian pug, is a moth of the family Geometridae. The species was first described by Jacob Hübner in 1813. It is found from Great Britain, through central Europe to western Russia, Belarus and northern Iran.

The wingspan is 16–20 mm. The ground colour of the forewings is glossy brownish grey. The darker-coloured crosslines are faint. There is a pale, dentate subterminal line (sometimes incomplete). The forewings have a dark discal mark (sometimes grey, indistinct or absent). The hindwings are pale whitish brown and there is a tornal spot.

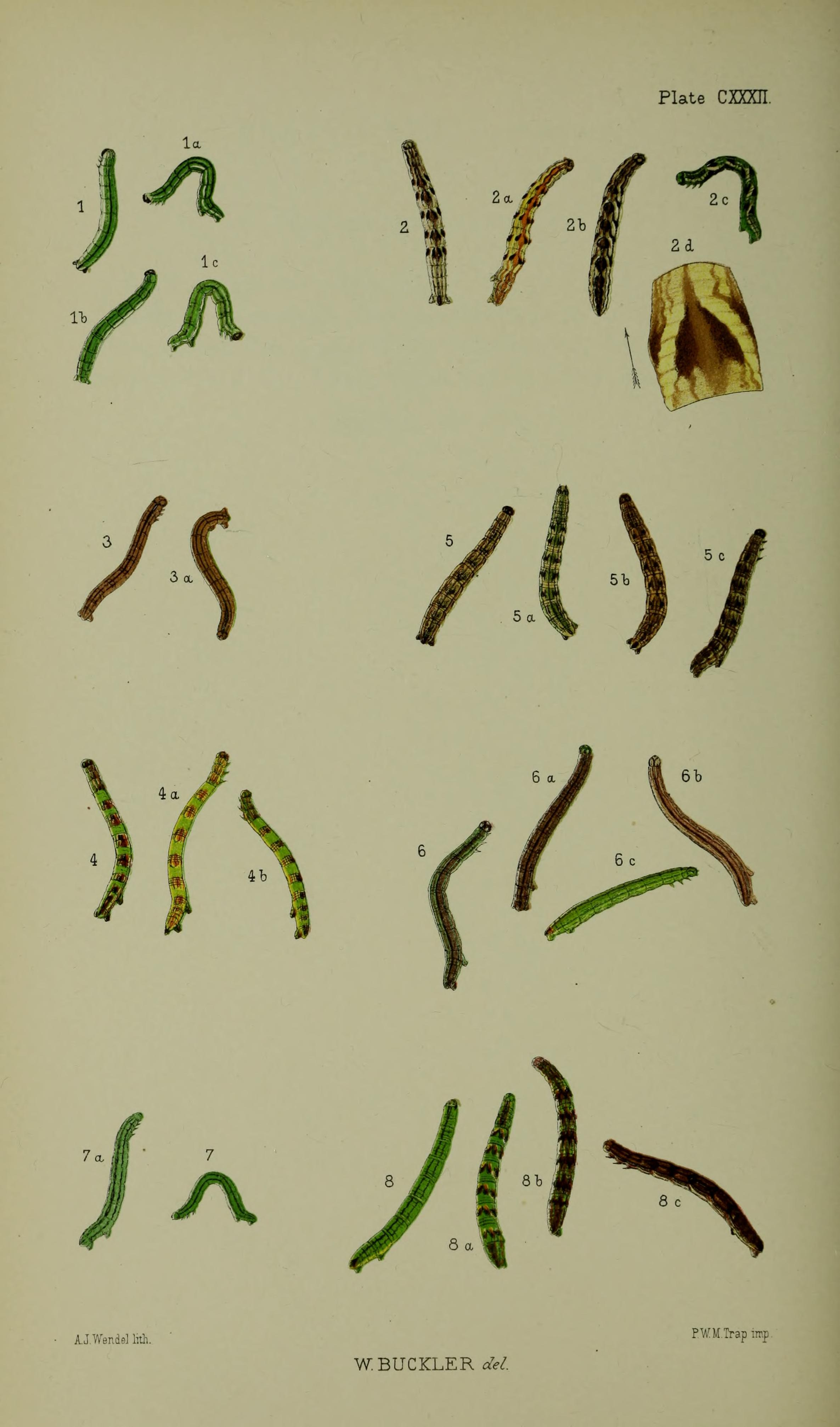
Figs 7,7a larvae in various stages

The larva is long and slender, smooth and light green with darker green longitudinal stripes.

There is one generation per year with adults on wing from mid-April to August.

Eupithecia valerianata inhabits wet meadows, ditch edges, forest edges and other locations where Valeriana species grow.

The larvae feed on Valeriana species. Larvae can be found from June to September. It overwinters as a pupa.

== Similar species ==
- Eupithecia haworthiata
- Eupithecia plumbeolata
