= List of types of limestone =

Limestone deposits listed by location

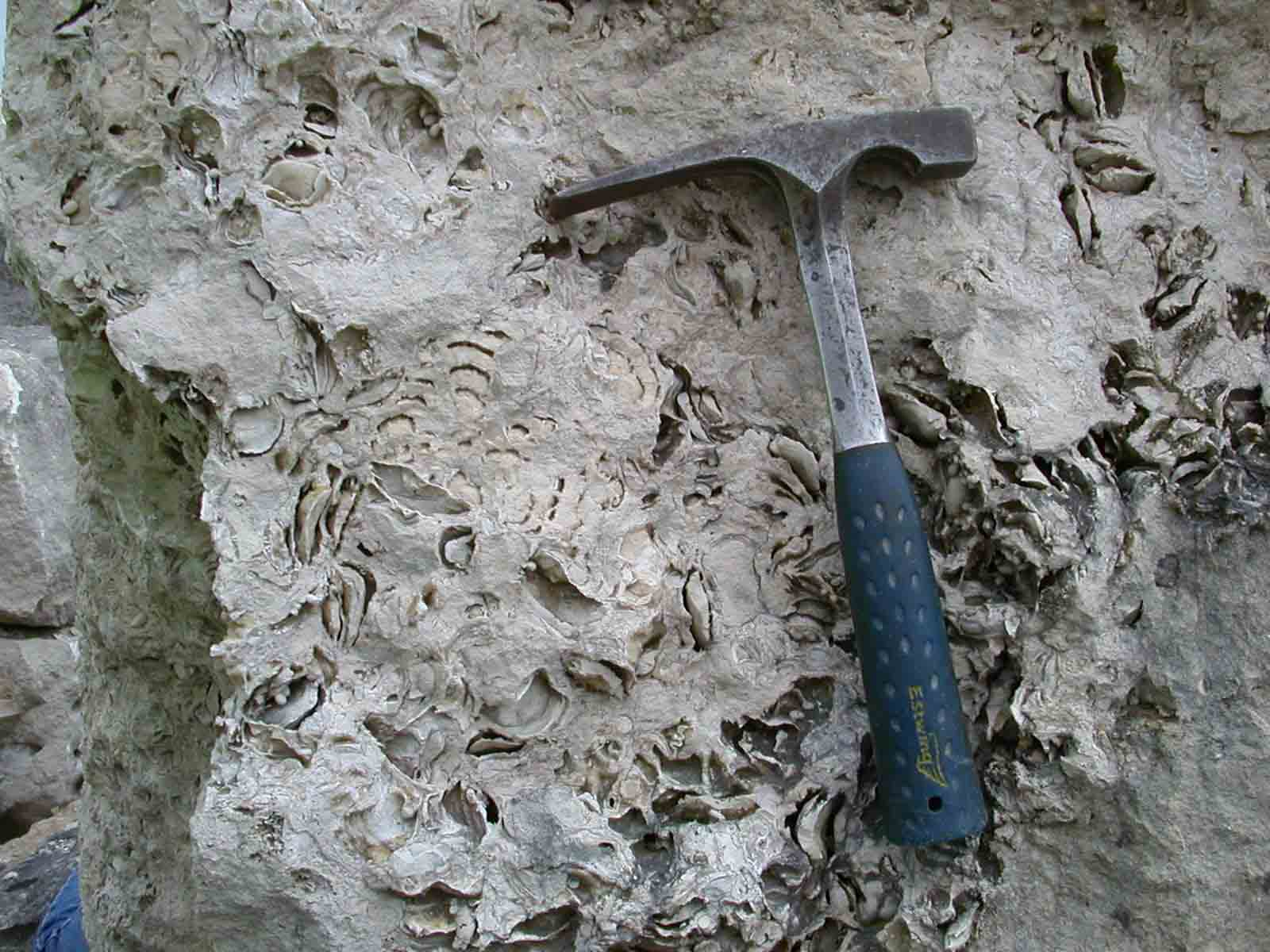
Portland Admiralty Roach from a quarry face on the Isle of Portland, Dorset, England

This article lists types of limestone arranged according to generic type and location.

== Generic limestone categories ==
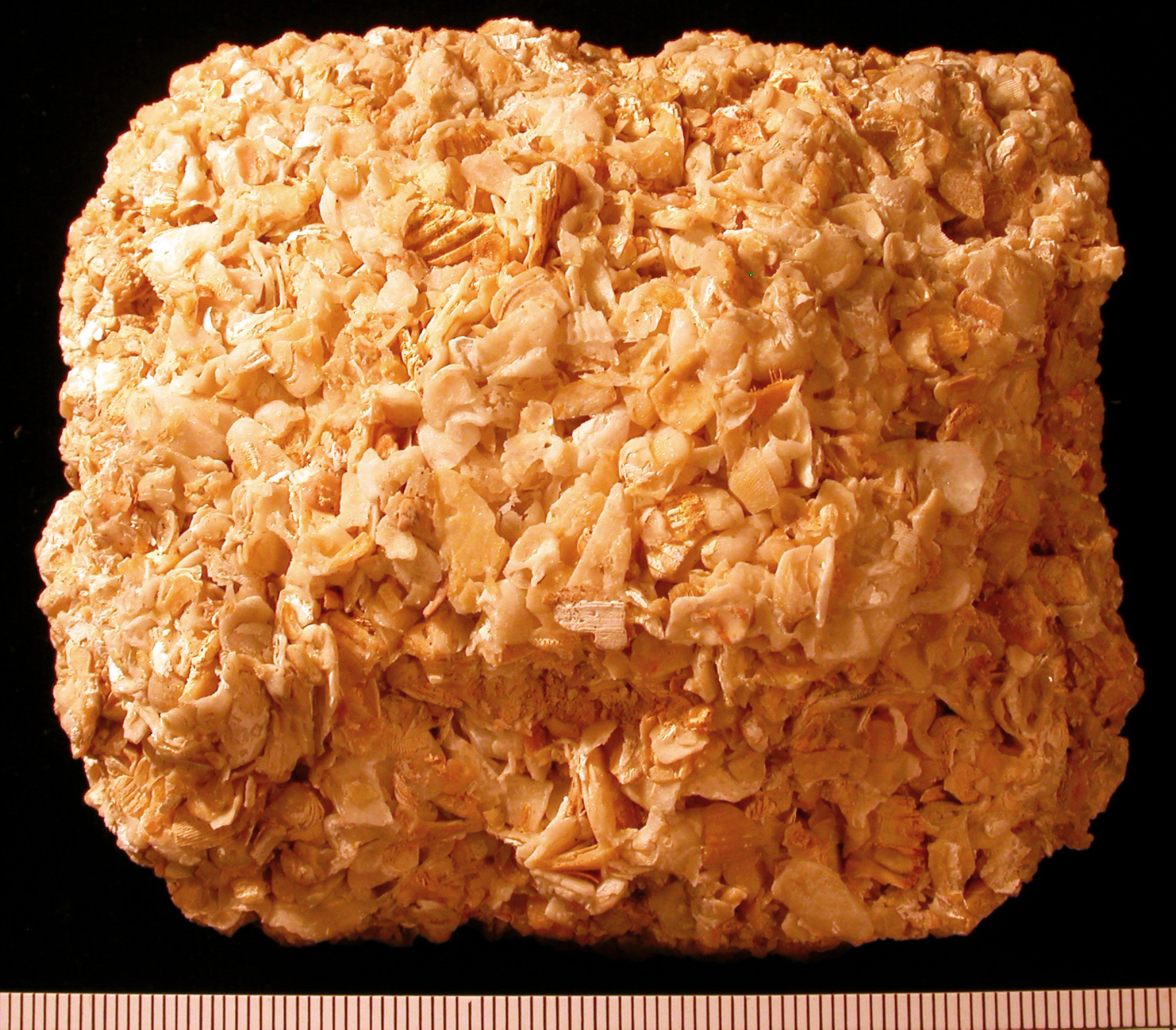
Coquina from Florida

This section is a list of generic types of limestone.

- Bituminous limestone
- Carboniferous Limestone – Limestone deposited during the Dinantian Epoch of the Carboniferous Period
- Coquina – Sedimentary rock that is composed mostly of fragments of shells
- Coral rag – Limestone composed of ancient coral reef material
- Chalk – Soft carbonate rock
- Fossiliferous limestone – Limestone containing fossils
- Lithographic limestone – Type of limestone with hard fine grain
- Marble – Metamorphic limestone
- Oolite – Sedimentary rock formed from ooids
- Rag-stone – Work done with stones that are quarried in thin pieces
- Shelly limestone – Limestone containing many fossils
- Travertine – Form of limestone deposited by mineral springs
- Tufa – Porous variety of limestone rock

The following sections include both formal stratigraphic unit names and less formal designations, although are these are not differentiated.

== Africa ==
=== Egypt ===
- Tura limestone, used for the Great Pyramid casing stones
- Mokattam limestone; Great Pyramid core stones and head of the Great Sphinx are of the "Member III" stratum
- Galala marble (a type of limestone, not a true marble)

== Asia ==
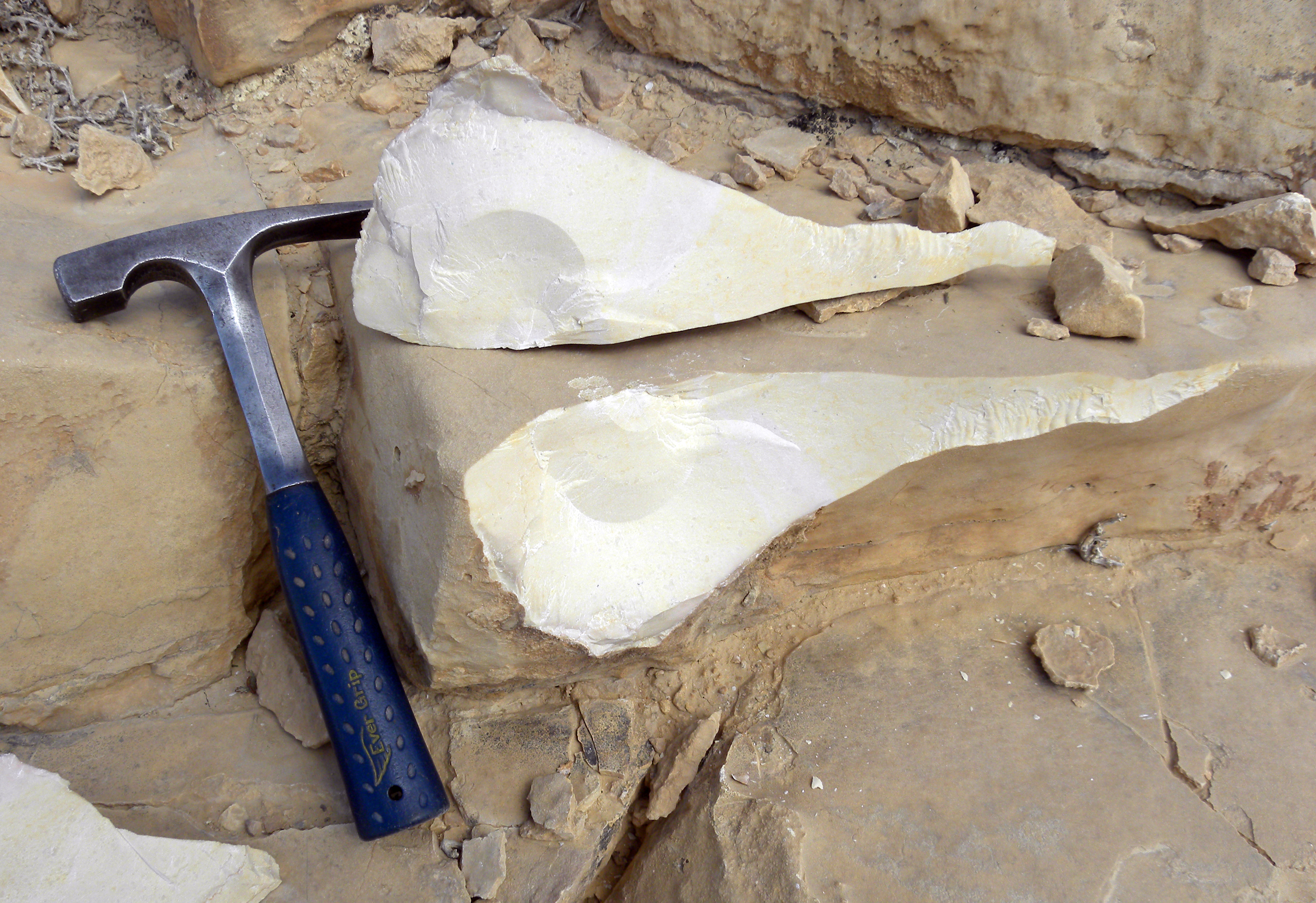
Meleke in the Gerofit Formation (Turonian) near Makhtesh Ramon, southern Israel

=== India ===
- Kota stone – Type of limestone from Rajasthan, India

=== Israel (West Bank) ===
- Meleke – Type of limestone
- Jerusalem stone – Type of pale building stone

== Europe ==
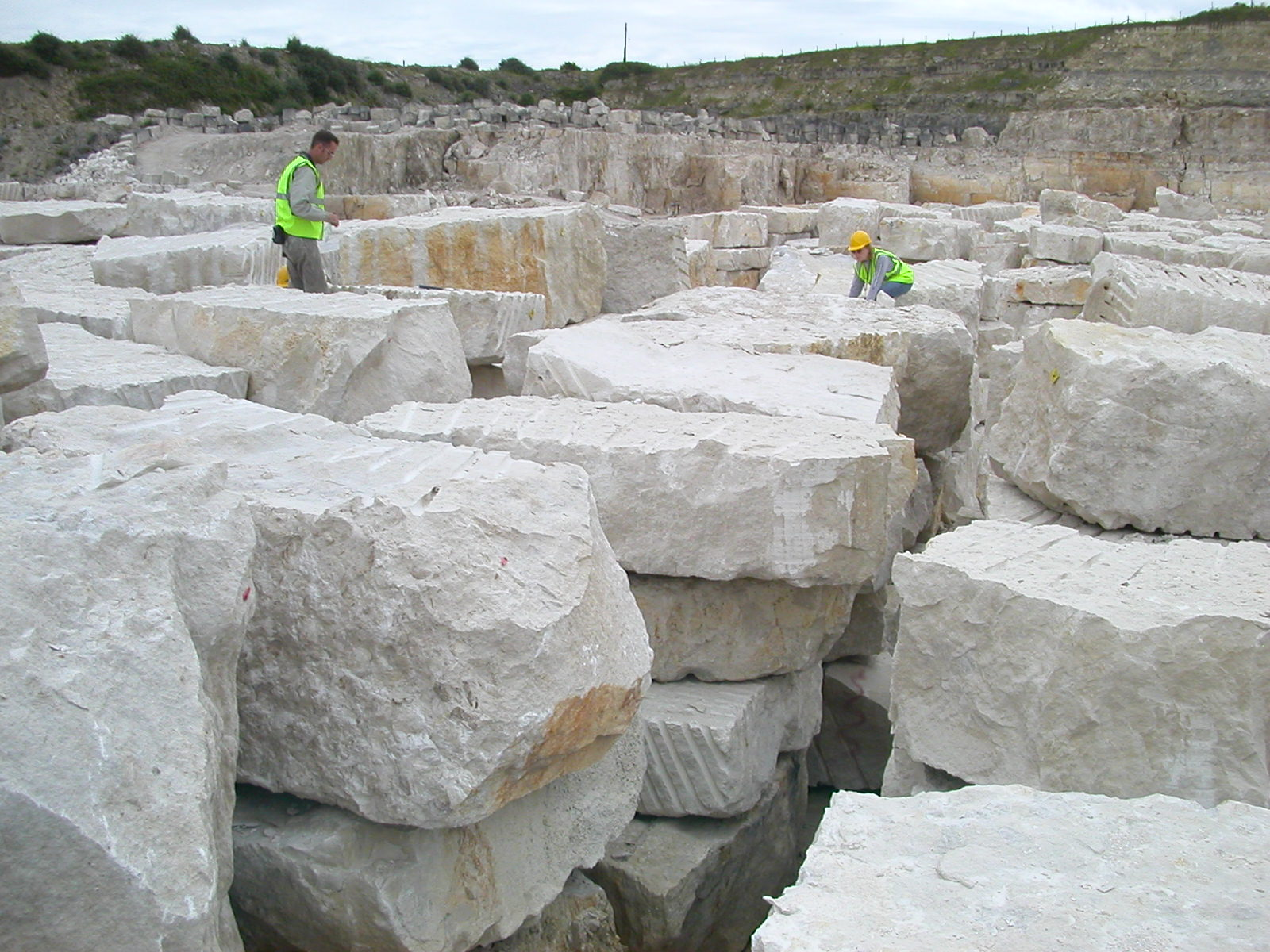
Portland Stone quarry on the Isle of Portland, Dorset

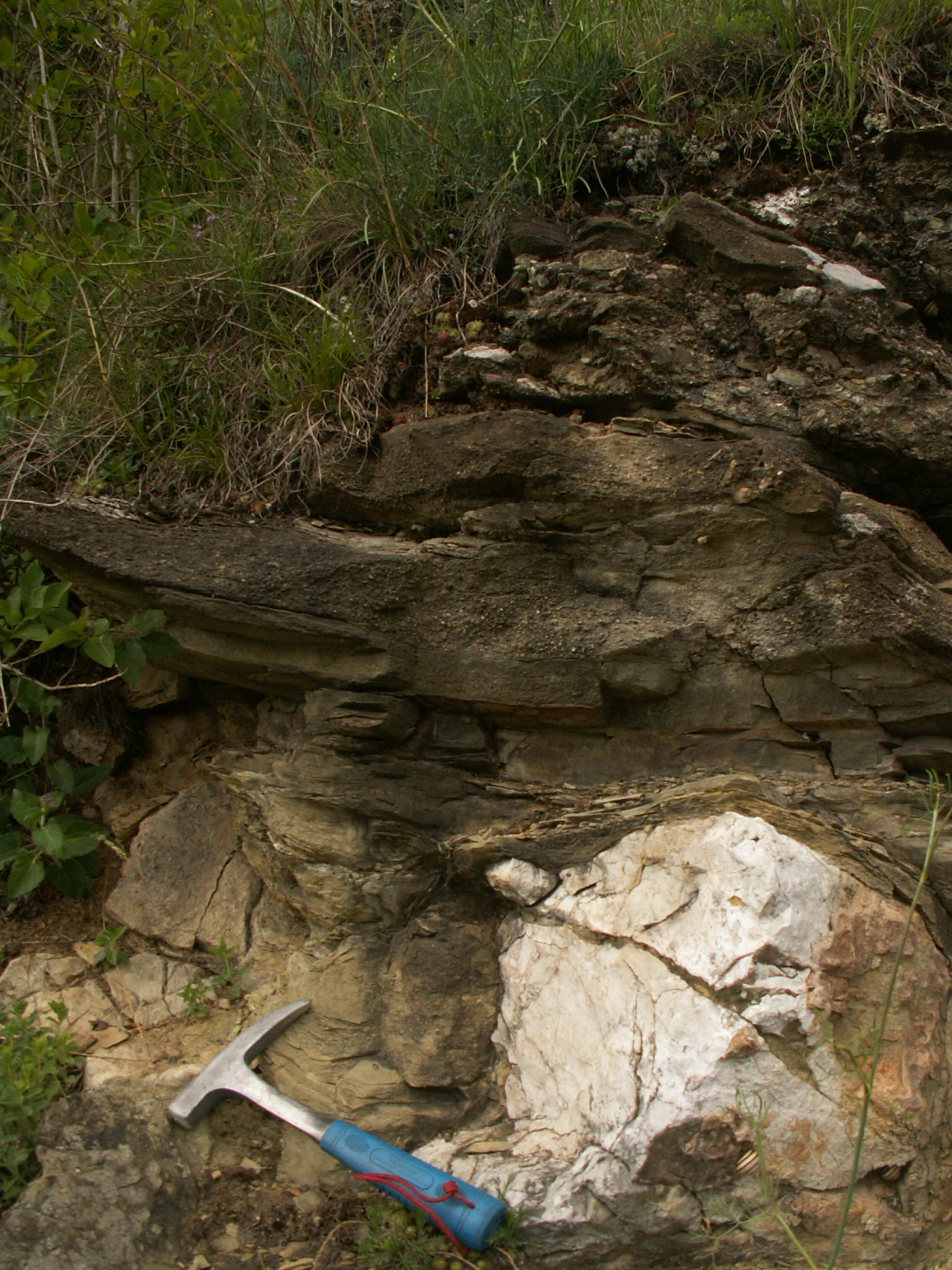
Transgression of the Paleogene sediments over the Wetterstein Limestone of the Silicic Superunit, Western Carpathians, Slovakia

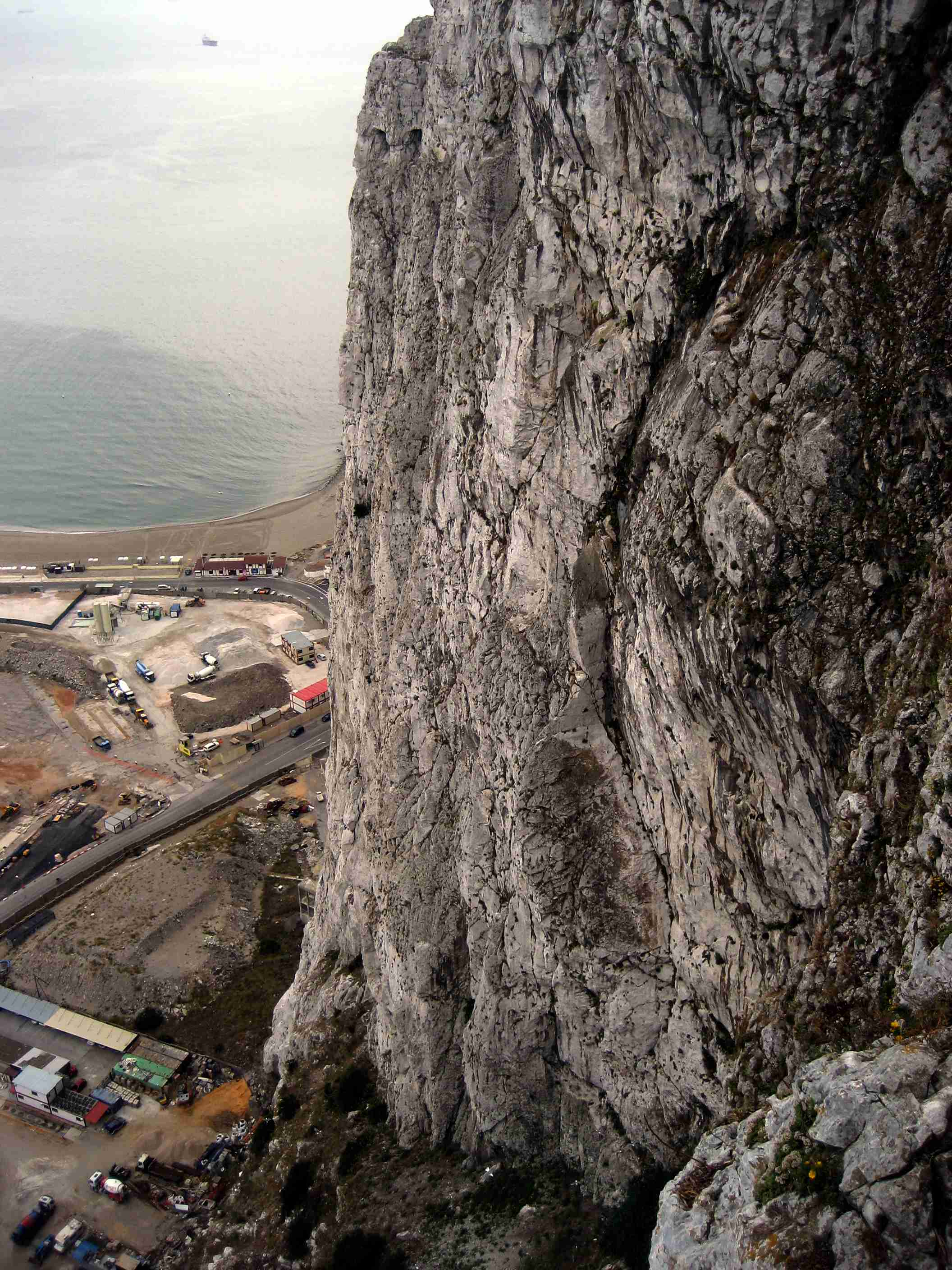
Gibraltar limestone: north face of Rock of Gibraltar

=== Austria ===
- Wetterstein limestone – Regional geologic formation in the Northern Limestone Alps and Western Carpathians

=== Belgium ===
- Belgian marble (not a "true marble"; Devonian limestone)
- Noir Belge
- Rouge Belge

=== Croatia ===
- Istrian stone – Type of limestone

=== France ===
- Caen Stone – Limestone quarried near Caen, France
- Lutetian limestone – Type of limestone from Paris, or "Paris stone" (city buildings are widely faced with it)
  - Saint-Maximin, or Oise, limestone (variety of Lutetian)
- Pierre de Jaumont
- Tuffeau stone – Limestone from the Loire Valley, France, in the Loire Valley

=== Germany ===
- Solnhofen limestone – Geological formation preserving rare fossils in Germany
- Wetterstein limestone – Regional geologic formation in the Northern Limestone Alps and Western Carpathians

=== Gibraltar ===
- Gibraltar Limestone – Geologic formation in Gibraltar

=== Ireland ===
- Kilkenny marble – Carboniferous limestone found in County Kilkenny, Ireland, not a "true marble"; fossiliferous carboniferous limestone

=== Italy ===
- Red Verona marble – Variety of limestone from Italy, not a "true marble"; fossiliferous limestone

=== United Kingdom ===
England:

- Ashford Black Marble – Very fine-grained sedimentary rock (not a "true marble"; Carboniferous limestone)
- Bath stone – Oolitic limestone from Somerset used as a building material
- Beer Stone – Man-made caves in Devon, England
- Clipsham stone – Village in Rutland, England, the famous London Stone is made of this.
- Collyweston stone slate – Traditional limestone roofing material of central England (not a "true slate"; thin-bedded limestone)
- Cotham Marble – Limestone variety from Great Britain (not a "true marble"; stromatolitic limestone)
- Cotswold stone – oolitic limestone used for building and roofing in the Cotswolds
- Dent Marble (not a "true marble"; Crinoidal limestone)
- Frosterley Marble – northern England (not a "true marble")
- Hamstone – Building stone from Somerset
- Headington stone – Limestone from Oxford, UK
- Hopton Wood Stone – Type of limestone
- Kentish ragstone, also known as Kentish rag – Hard grey limestone in Kent, England
- Ketton stone
- Pembroke Limestone Group
- Portland stone – Limestone quarried on the Isle of Portland, Dorset, England
  - Portland Admiralty Roach – Rock type
  - Bowers Basebed
  - Portland Bowers Roach
  - Portland Jordans Roach – Stone variety from the Isle of Portland
- Purbeck stone – Limestone from Dorset
  - Purbeck Marble – Fossiliferous limestone found in the Isle of Purbeck, Dorset, England (not a "true marble"; fossiliferous limestone)
- Sussex Marble (not a "true marble"; fossiliferous freshwater limestone)

Scotland:

- Charlestown limestone – Limestone quarrying in Charlestown, Fife, Scotland

Wales:

- Cymerig Limestone – Geologic formation in Wales

== North America ==
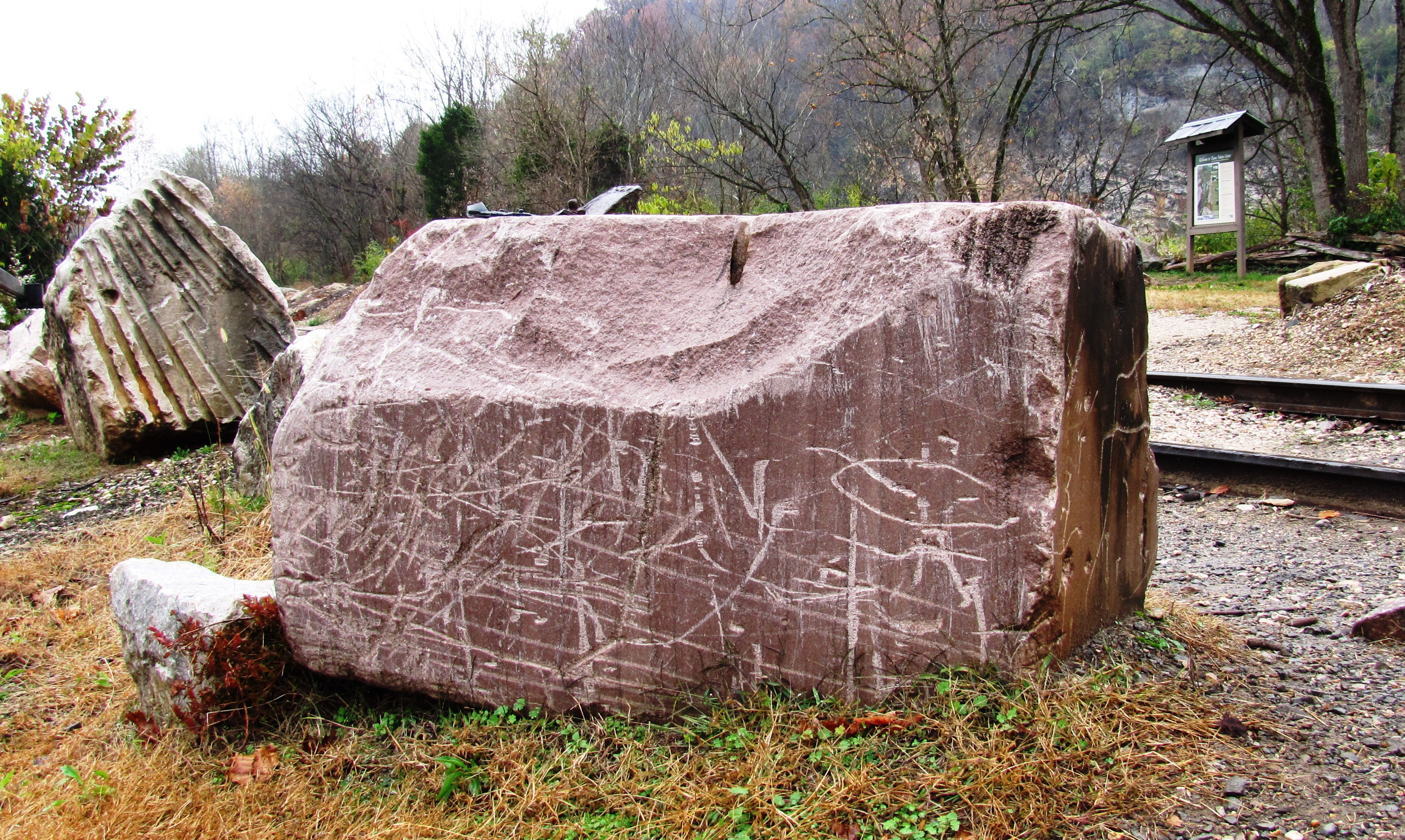
Quarried block of pink Tennessee "marble"

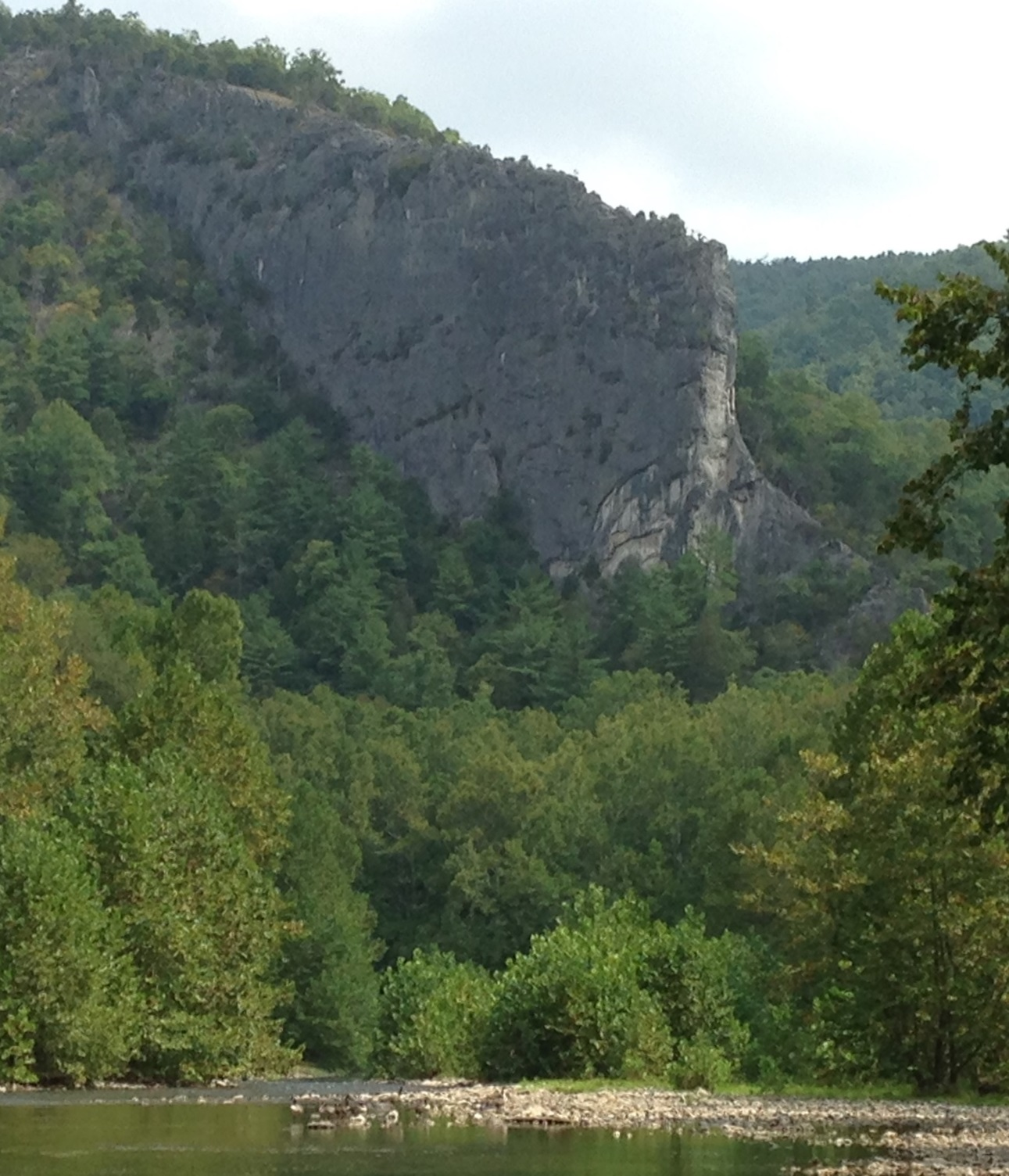
Blue Rock, a Tonoloway Limestone "fin", in West Virginia, USA

=== United States ===
- Anamosa Limestone – Dolomitic limestone from Stone City, Iowa, USA
- Bear Gulch Limestone – Paleontological site in Montana, USA
- Columbus Limestone – Geologic formation in the United States and Canada
- Cottonwood Limestone – Historic stone resource in the Midwestern United States
- Greenbrier Limestone – Lithostratigraphic unit
- Harrodsburg Limestone – Geologic formation in Indiana, United States
- Heceta Limestone – Geologic Formation in Alaska
- Hokie stone – Grey dolomite-limestone rock found near Blacksburg, Virginia
- Indiana Limestone – Limestone quarried in Indiana, United States (Bedford limestone)
- Jeffersonville Limestone – Bedrock unit in Indiana and Kentucky, United States
- Kaibab Limestone – Geologic formation in the southwestern United States
- Kasota limestone – Type of rock in southern Minnesota
- Keyser Limestone – Limestone bedrock unit in the Eastern United States
- Keystone
- Madison Limestone – Geologic formation in the western United States
- Michigan limestone
- Onondaga Limestone – Hard limestones rock formation in North America
- St. Genevieve marble – Marble found in Missouri (not a "true marble"; oolitic limestone)
- St. Louis Limestone – Mississippian period geologic formation in the Midwest United States
- Tennessee marble – Type of crystalline limestone (not a "true marble"; crystalline limestone)
- Tonoloway Limestone – Geologic formation in the United States

=== Canada ===
- Eramosa marble – Stratigraphic unit of the Lockport Formation (not a "true marble"; bituminous dolomite)
- Ostracod Beds – Stratigraphic Group in Western Canada (also known as the "Ostracod Limestone")
- Tyndall stone – Trademark of limestone from Canada

== Oceania ==
=== Australia ===
- Tamala Limestone – Limestone deposits in Western Australia

=== New Zealand ===
- Oamaru stone – Limestone quarried at New Zealand — Hard, compact bryozoan limestone. Granular and creamy white, it usually contains traces of alumina, iron oxide, and silica.

== See also ==
- List of decorative stones
- List of sandstones
- List of types of marble
