= Buono (disambiguation) =

Buono is an Italian word meaning "good."

Buono may also refer to:

== People ==
- Buono (surname)

== Media ==
- Buono!, a Japanese girl group

== Locations ==
- Buono Beach, a public park in Staten Island, New York, USA
- San Buono, a comune and town in the Abruzzo region of Italy
- Vulcano Buono, a shopping mall and leisure center in Nola, Italy

== Other uses ==
- Portoro Buono, a decorative stone from Porto Venere, Italy

== See also ==
- Bueno (disambiguation)
