= List of decorative stones =

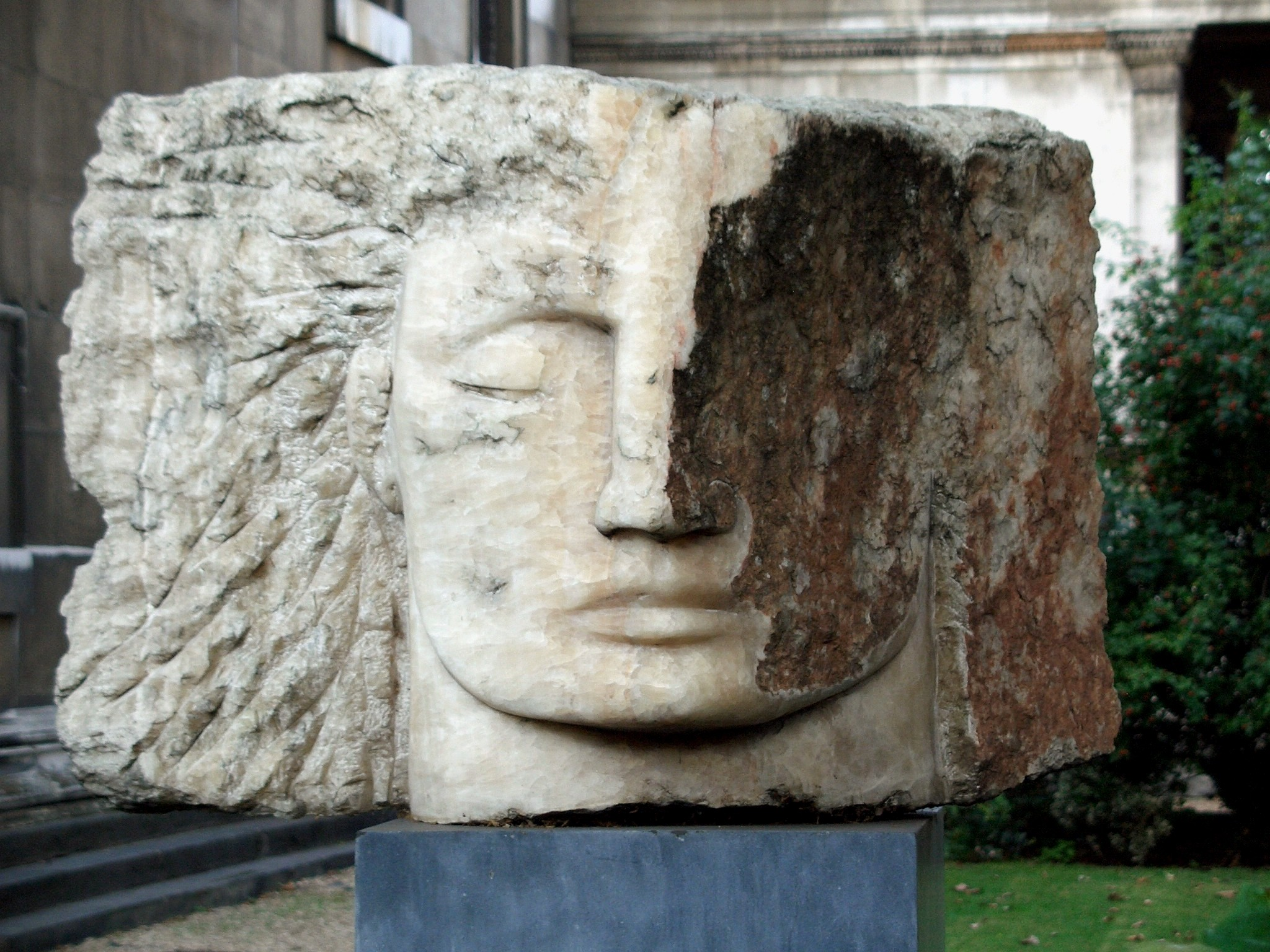
Onyx sculpture in the grounds of St Pancras New Church, London

This is a geographical list of natural stone used for decorative purposes in construction and monumental sculpture produced in various countries.

The dimension-stone industry classifies stone based on appearance and hardness as either "granite", "marble" or "slate".

The granite of the dimension-stone industry along with truly granitic rock also includes gneiss, gabbro, anorthosite and even some sedimentary rocks.

Natural stone is used as architectural stone (construction, flooring, cladding, counter tops, curbing, etc.) and as raw block and monument stone for the funerary trade. Natural stone is also used in custom stone engraving. The engraved stone can be either decorative or functional. Natural memorial stones are used as natural burial markers.

== Africa ==
Marble

== Asia ==
=== India ===
See Stones of India

=== Pakistan ===
Pakistan has more than 300 kinds of marble and natural stone.

=== Iran ===
Iran has more than 250 kinds of marble, travertine, onyx, granite, and limestone.

== Europe ==
=== France ===
- Limestone
  - Caen stone
  - Pierre de Comblanchien, see also Côte d'Or (escarpment)
  - Pierre d'Euville
  - Pierre de Jaumont
  - Tuffeau stone

=== Greece ===
- Marble
- Verde antico

=== Italy ===
- Carrara marble
- Peperino
- Pietra serena
- Portoro Buono
- Travertine

=== Belgium, Norway and Poland ===
Country	Type	Stone	Location
Belgium	Limestone	Petit Granit	Soignies and Tournai
Norway	Anorthosite	Labrador Antique	Sirevåg, Hå
Norway	Anorthosite	Blue Antique	Hellvik, Eigersund
Norway	Larvikite	Blue Pearl	Tveidalen, Larvik
Norway	Larvikite	Emerald Pearl	Tjølling, Larvik
Norway	Larvikite	Silver Pearl	Håkestad, Larvik
Norway	Marble	Coloritt	Leivset, Fauske
Norway	Marble	Antique Fonce	Løgavlen, Fauske
Norway	Marble	Norwegian Rose	Løgavlen, Fauske
Norway	Marble	Arctic Green	Løgavlen, Fauske
Norway	Quartzite	Masi quartzite	Gaskabeaivárri, Náranaš, Kautokeino
Norway	Marble	Arctic Green	Løgavlen, Fauske
Poland	Sandstone	Arctic Green	Løgavlen, Fauske
Poland	Sandstone	Arctic Green	Løgavlen, Fauske
Poland	Sandstone	Arctic Green	Løgavlen, Fauske
Poland	Sandstone	Arctic Green	Løgavlen, Fauske
Poland	Sandstone	Arctic Green	Løgavlen, Fauske

=== Poland ===
- Sandstone
  - Radków
  - Szczytna
  - Czaple (Heron)
  - Skała (Rock)
- Limestone
  - Dębnik
  - Kielce
- Granite
  - Strzegom
  - Strzelin
- Syenite, Granodiorite
  - Kośmin
  - Przedborowa
- Serpentinite
  - Nasławice

=== United Kingdom ===
- Chalk
  - Clunch
- Flint
- Granite
  - Aberdeen granite
- Limestone
  - Ancaster stone
  - Barnack rag
  - Beer stone
  - Clipsham stone
  - Corallian limestone
  - Cotswold stone (Oolitic limestone)
  - Forest marble
  - Frosterley Marble
  - Ketton Stone
  - Magnesian Limestone
  - Portland stone
    - Portland Admiralty Roach
    - Portland Bowers Basebed
    - Portland Bowers Lynham Whitbed
    - Portland Bowers Saunders Whitbed
    - Portland Grove Whitbed
    - Portland Hard Blue
    - Portland Independent Basebed
    - Portland Independent Bottom Whitbed
    - Portland Independent Top Whitbed
    - Portland New Independent Whitbed
  - Purbeck marble
- Sandstone
  - Banktop
  - Bearl
  - Blaxter
  - Catcastle
  - Corsehill
  - Corncockle
  - Dunhouse Blue
  - Dunhouse Buff
  - Hall Dale
  - Haslingden Flag
  - Heavitree stone
  - Locharbriggs
  - Ravensworth
  - Yorkstone
- Slate
  - Welsh Slate
  - Skiddaw Slate

== Southeast Europe ==
=== Turkey ===
- Elazig Cherry (serpentinite)
- Burdur Beige (limestone)
- Emperador Dark (dolomitic limestone)
- Marmara marble (marble)
- Mugla White (marble)
- Noche Travertine (freshwater limestone, travertine)

== Middle East ==
=== Israel ===
- Limestone/Dolomite
  - Jerusalem stone

== North America ==
=== Canada ===
- Anorthosite

Stone	Location	Stone	Location	Stone	Location	Stone	Location	Stone	Location
Cambrian black	Quebec	Noir cambrien	Quebec	Noir taillon	Quebec	Peribonka	Quebec	Ocelot	Quebec
Noir taillon	Quebec	Noir cambrien	Quebec	Laurentian pink	Quebec				

- Charnockite

Stone	Location	Stone	Location
Laurentide green	Quebec	Prairie green	Quebec

- Diabase

Stone	Location
Imperial black	Quebec

- Diorite

Stone	Location	Stone	Location
Whistler white	British Columbia	Midnight blue	Quebec

- Granite

Stone	Location	Stone	Location	Stone	Location	Stone	Location	Stone	Location
Atlantic Black	Quebec	Spring Green	Quebec	Wild Pink	Quebec	Autumn Harmony	Quebec	Peribonka	Quebec
Laurentide Green	Quebec	Black Cambrian	Quebec	Birch White	Quebec	Gris St-Sébastien	Quebec	Pine Green	Ontario
Vermillon Pink	Ontario	Canadian Mahogany	Ontario	Tadoussac	Quebec	Dark steel	Quebec	Deer brown	Quebec
Ash brown	Quebec	Polychrome	Quebec	Green leaf	Quebec	Sonata	Quebec	Saguenay brown	Quebec
Shipshaw	Quebec	Saguenay red	Quebec						

- Gabbro

Stone	Location
Black daniel	Quebec

- Gneiss

Stone	Location	Stone	Location	Stone	Location	Stone	Location	Stone	Location
Riviere Pentecote	Quebec	Gallix	Quebec	Nordic river	Quebec	Betchouan-violetta	Quebec	Apica	Quebec
Sawene	Quebec	Stanstead grey	Quebec	Brun castor	Quebec	Alpine summer	Quebec	Boston Bar	British Columbia
Aqua mist	British Columbia	Robson rose	British Columbia	Sumas sky	British Columbia	Valley rose	British Columbia	Whitewater classico	British Columbia
Whitewater	British Columbia	Atlantic pink	Newfoundland	Cascade coral	British Columbia	Betchouan	Quebec	Riviera	Quebec
Rose riviere	Quebec	Ash rose	Quebec	Astra	Quebec	Winneway beige	Quebec	Dark caledonia	Quebec
Royal Canadian red	Manitoba	Winneway rose	Quebec	Noir nordique	Quebec	Beluro	Grandes Bergeronnes	Anticostie	Quebec
St Lawrence green	Quebec	Franquelin red	Quebec	Gris St Sébastien	Quebec	Newton	Quebec	Caledonia original	Quebec
Stanstead grey	Quebec	Charcoal grey	Quebec	Arctic white	Quebec	Snow white	Coaticook	Abbey rose	Quebec
Acajou	Quebec	Granville	Quebec	Caledonia nara	Quebec	New new	Quebec	Newport	Quebec
Caledonia	Quebec								

- Limestone

Stone	Location	Stone	Location	Stone	Location	Stone	Location	Stone	Location
Tyndall	Manitoba	Eramosa	Ontario	Adair sepia	Ontario	Ledgerock	Ontario	Arriscraft	Ontario
Algonquin	Ontario	Hope Bay	Ontario	Mara	Ontario	Senesun	Ontario	St Marc des Carrières	Quebec

- Marble

Stone	Location

- Monzonite

Stone	Location	Stone	Location	Stone	Location
Autumn brown	Quebec	Polychrome	Quebec	Sagami	Quebec

- Sandstone

Stone	Location	Stone	Location	Stone	Location	Stone	Location	Stone	Location
Ducharme brun	Quebec	Ducharme bleu ciel	Quebec	Ducharme bleu foncé	Quebec	Ducharme bleu pale	Quebec	Ducharme brun garry	Quebec
Ducharme chamois joel	Quebec	Ducharme gris cendre	Quebec	Ducharme jaune adirondack	Quebec	Ducharme jaune marbre	Quebec	Ducharme jaune pale	Quebec

- Slate

Stone	Location
La canadienne	Quebec

- Steatite (Soapstone)

Stone	Location

- Stromatolites

Stone	Location	Stone	Location
Albanel	Quebec	Mistassini	Quebec

- Syenite

Stone	Location
Magpie brown	Quebec

=== Mesoamerica ===
- Tezontle — a volcanic rock used in Pre-Columbian Mesoamerican architecture.

- Archaeological sites with tezontle structures are located in present day México and northern Central America.

=== United States ===
- Brownstone, a type of Triassic sandstone
- Granite, extensively quarried in Vermont, Georgia and New Hampshire
- Black granite – a common trade name for gabbro used as architectural material
- Austin limestone – a marble-like stone widely used as a building stone for interior and exterior wall cladding and interior and exterior paving

== Oceania ==
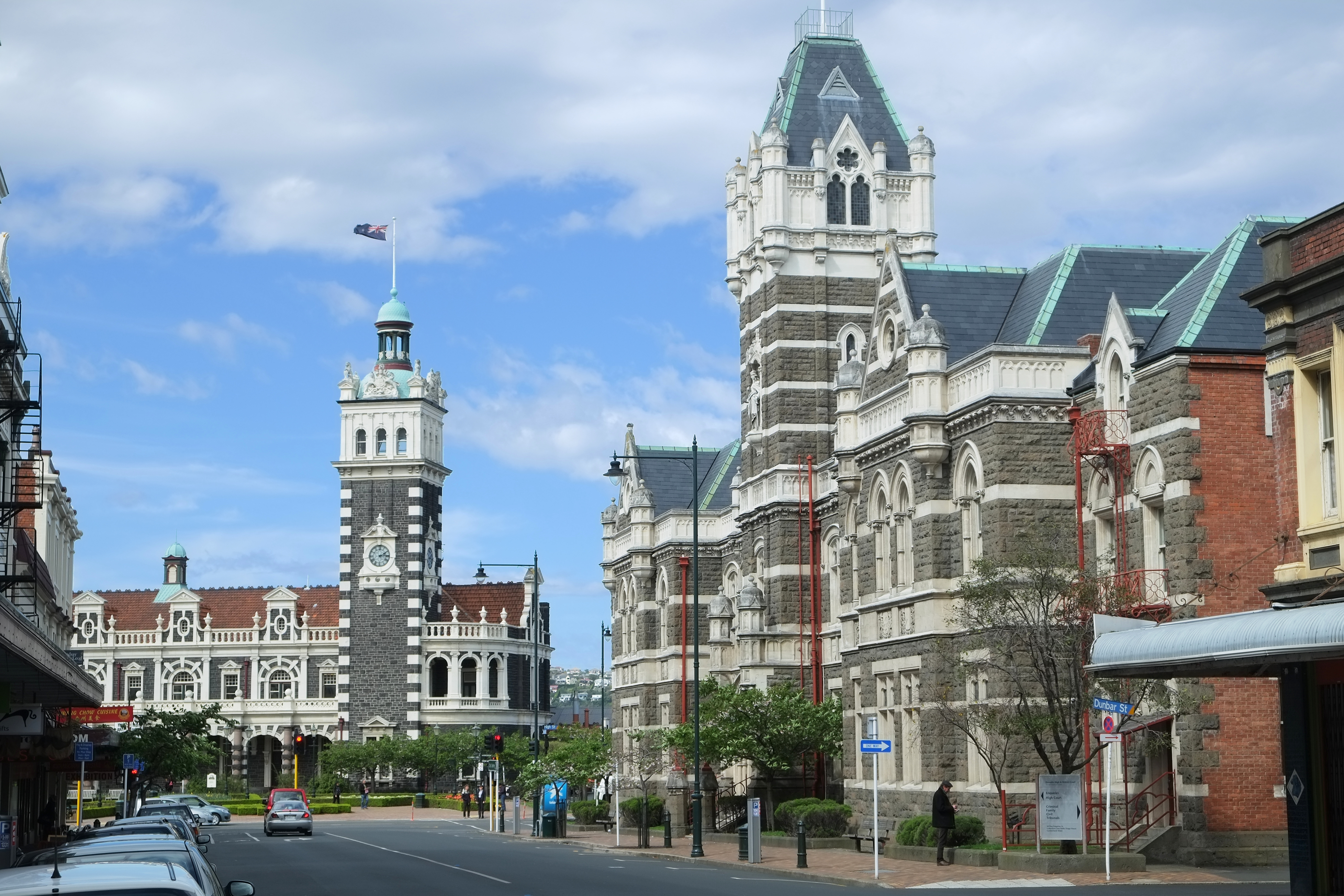
Dunedin Railway Station and Law Courts, New Zealand, showing dark Port Chalmers bluestone and creamy Oamaru stone construction

=== New Zealand ===
- Oamaru stone — a creamy limestone mined in North Otago used for architecture and sculpture
- Port Chalmers bluestone (also called Timaru bluestone) — a dark basalt mined in Otago and Canterbury used for architecture

== See also ==
- Building stone
- List of types of limestone
- List of types of marble
- List of sandstones
- NIST Stone test wall — U.S. National Institute of Standards and Technology—NIST.
- List of rock types
- List of minerals
- Quarrying
- Rock (geology)
- Stonemasonry
