= Cladospongia =

Cladospongia may refer to:

- Cladospongia (protist), a genus of choanoflagellates in the family Codonosigidae
- Cladospongia (sponge), an extinct genus of sponges in the family Preperonidellidae
