= Stone wall =

Masonry structural division

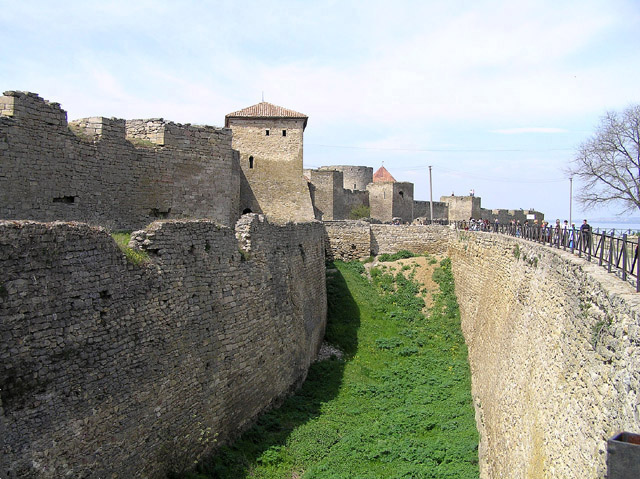
Defensive stone wall and moat in Fortress of Akkerman in Bilhorod-Dnistrovskyi, Ukraine

Stone walls are a kind of masonry construction that has been used for thousands of years.

== History and prehistory ==
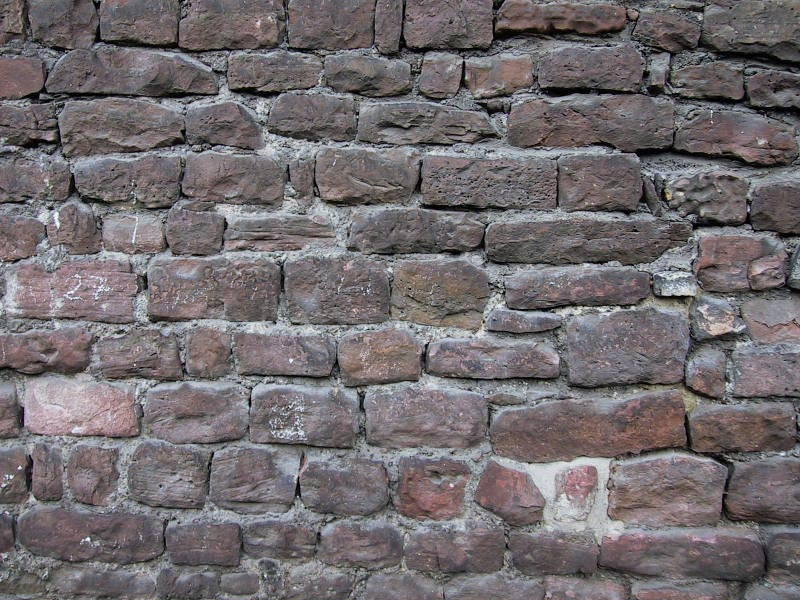
City wall in Worms, Germany

The first stone walls were likely constructed by hunters to trap or ambush wild game. Later, farmers made walls by piling loose fieldstones into a dry stone wall. Later, mortar and plaster were used, especially in the construction of city walls, castles, and other fortifications before and during the Middle Ages. These stone walls are spread throughout the world in different forms.

== Materials ==
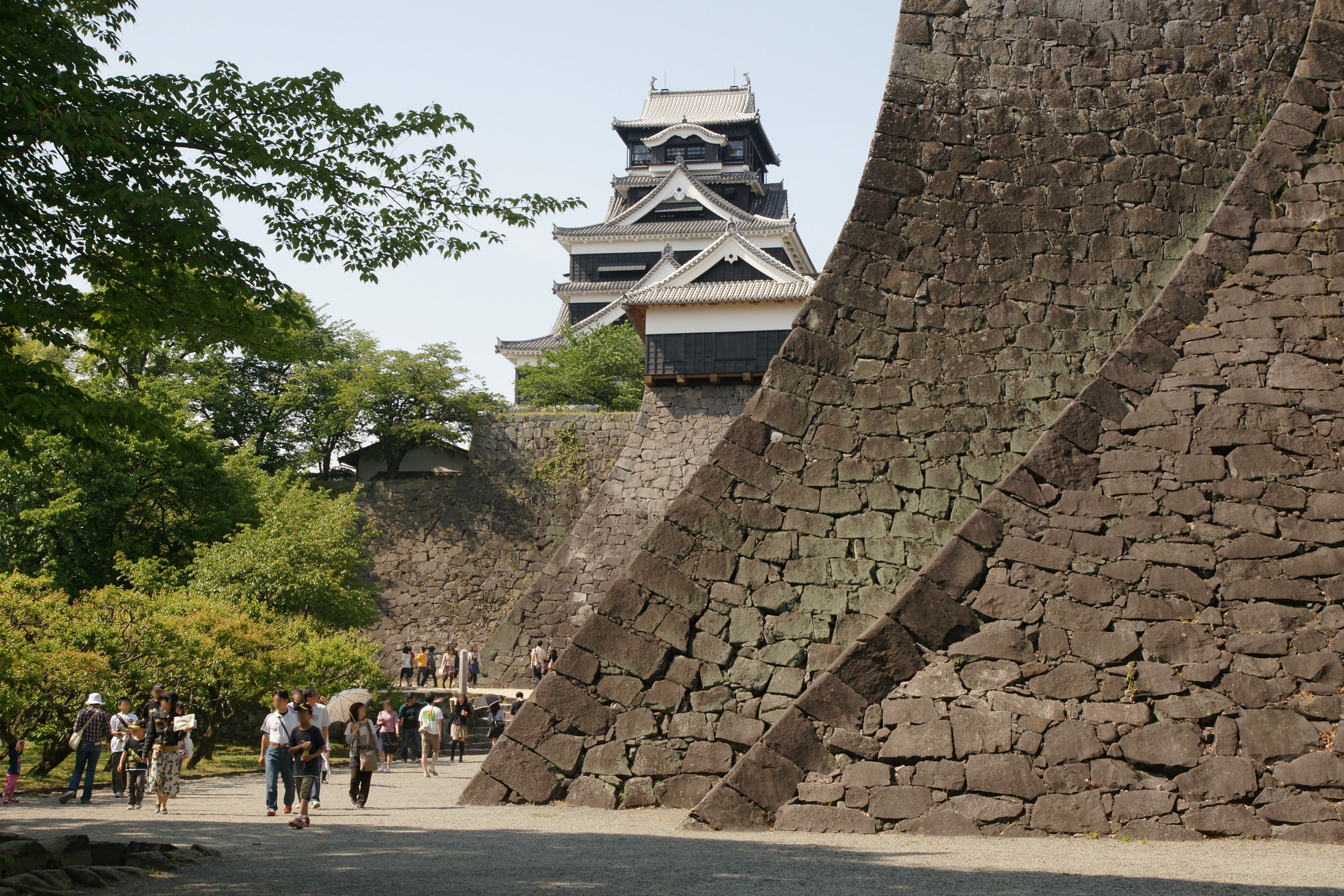
Stone wall of Kumamoto Castle

Stone walls are usually made of local materials varying from limestone and flint to granite and sandstone. However, the quality of building stone varies greatly, both in its endurance to weathering, resistance to water penetration and in its ability to be worked into regular shapes before construction. Worked stone is usually known as ashlar, and is often used for corners in stone buildings. Granite is very resistant to weathering, while some limestones are very weak. Other limestones, such as Portland stone, are more weather-resistant.

== Dimensions ==
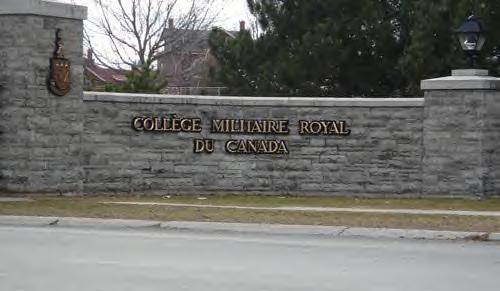
Limestone wall at Royal Military College of Canada

Large structures are typically constructed with thick walls, such as those found in castles and cathedrals, which can reach up to 12 feet in thickness. These walls generally consist of a layered stone exterior and rubble infill.

== Examples ==
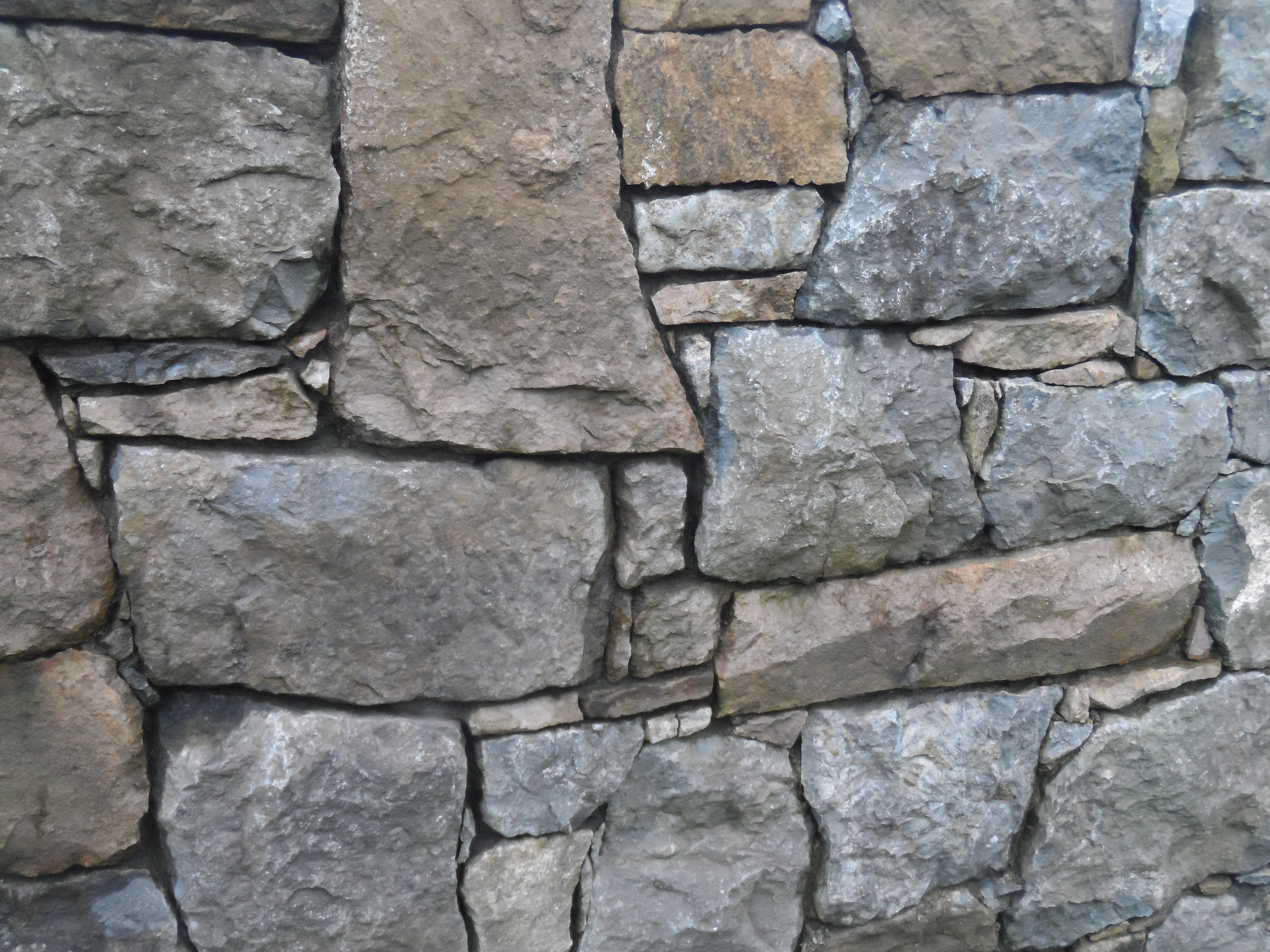
Stone wall, Ireland

- The Great Wall of China, China. A grandiose 5,000 km long structure - 4,000 km across mountains, prairie and desert.
- Hadrian's Wall, Great Britain. When in 117 AD the Picts who inhabited Scotland defeated the famous XI Spanish legion, Emperor Hadrian decided to fence off his malevolent neighbours. This is how Hadrian's Wall (122-126) and then Antoninus' Wall (142-144) were first erected. The dimensions of both structures are impressive - 120 and 63 km respectively. Built of peat and stone, they are not as well preserved as many other buildings of the era.
- Aurelian's Wall, Rome, Italy. With this wall, Emperor Aurelian wanted to protect the city from invading barbarians. He was in a great hurry and the monumental structure, 19 km in circumference, 8 m high and 3.4 m thick, was built in only 5 years (271-275).
- Avila, Spain. The 12 m high and 3 m thick stone walls, 9 gates and 88 towers represent a well-preserved medieval fortress. It was built between the 11th and 14th centuries on the site of Arab and Roman fortifications.
- Essaouira, Morocco. An 18th-century international design: with the help of European engineers and architects, Sultan Mohammed III Ben Abdallah created a "beautifully designed fortress", which is how the name Es-Saouira translates.
- Greater Zimbabwe, Zimbabwe. The ancient and largest sub-Saharan African city, it was built from the 11th to the 14th century and at its peak it was inhabited by some 18,000 people.
- The ramparts of Old Quebec, Canada. Europeans established their first settlement here in 1535 - it was called "canada" (in the language of the natives, "village", "settlement"). The city of Quebec came later, in 1608, but today its fortress walls are the oldest in North America.
- Sacsayhuaman, Cusco, Peru. The ancient city of Cusco resembles a puma (the sacred animal of the ruling dynasty) in outline and the six-metre high fortress walls are its "teeth".
- Castillo San Felipe de Barajas, Cartagena, Colombia. One of Colombia's Seven Wonders, the 16th century fortress is known for its walls, thick at the base and tapering at the top.

== See also ==
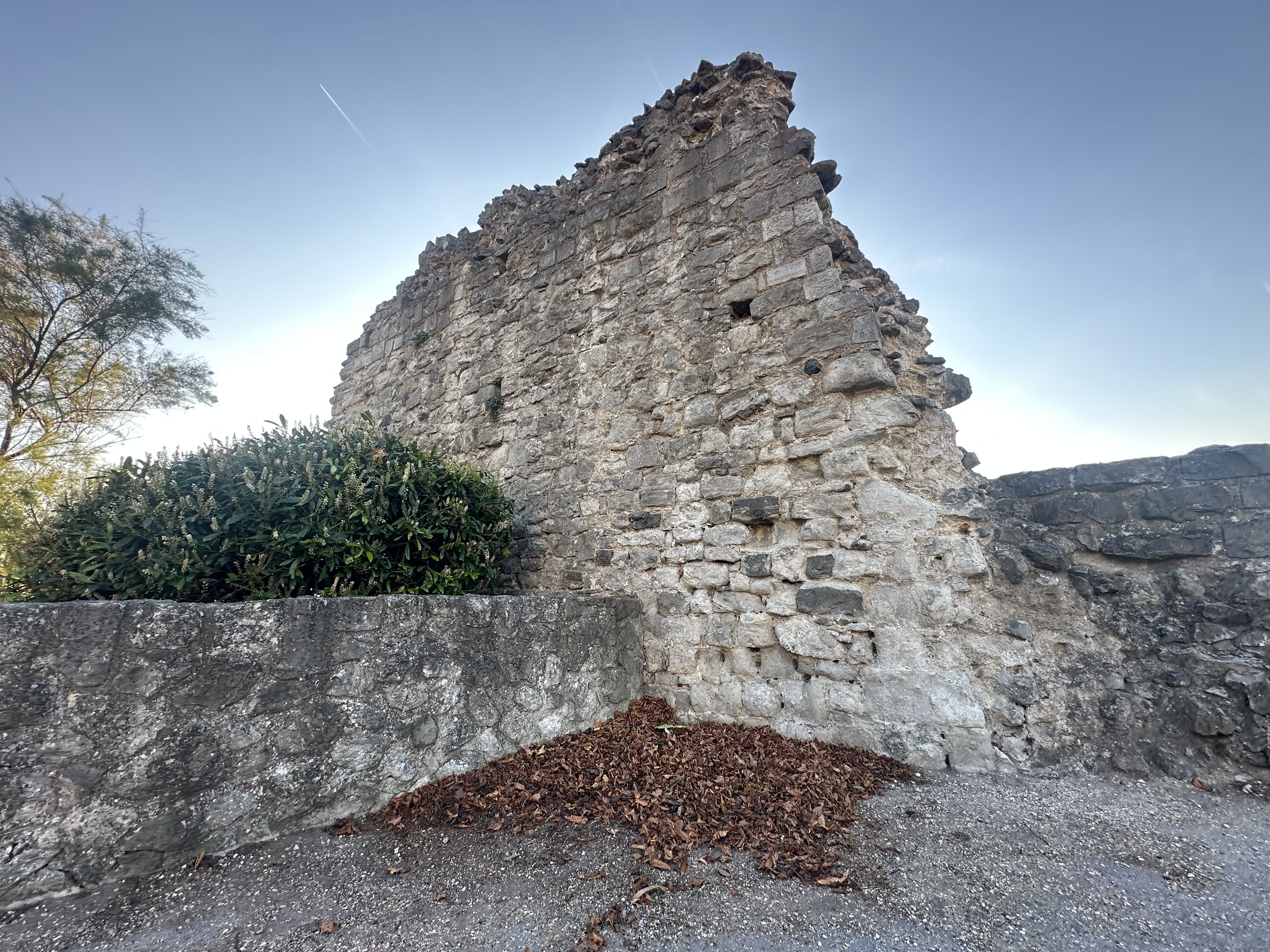
Medieval stonework ruins at Rochester Castle, Kent, England

- Dry-stone wall – Construction method
- Defensive wall – Fortification used to protect an area from potential aggressors
- Earth structure – Building or other structure made largely from soil
- Fieldstone – Building material
- NIST stone test wall
- Stonemasonry – Creation of buildings, structures, and sculpture using stone
