= Hokie Stone =

Grey dolomite-limestone rock found near Blacksburg, Virginia

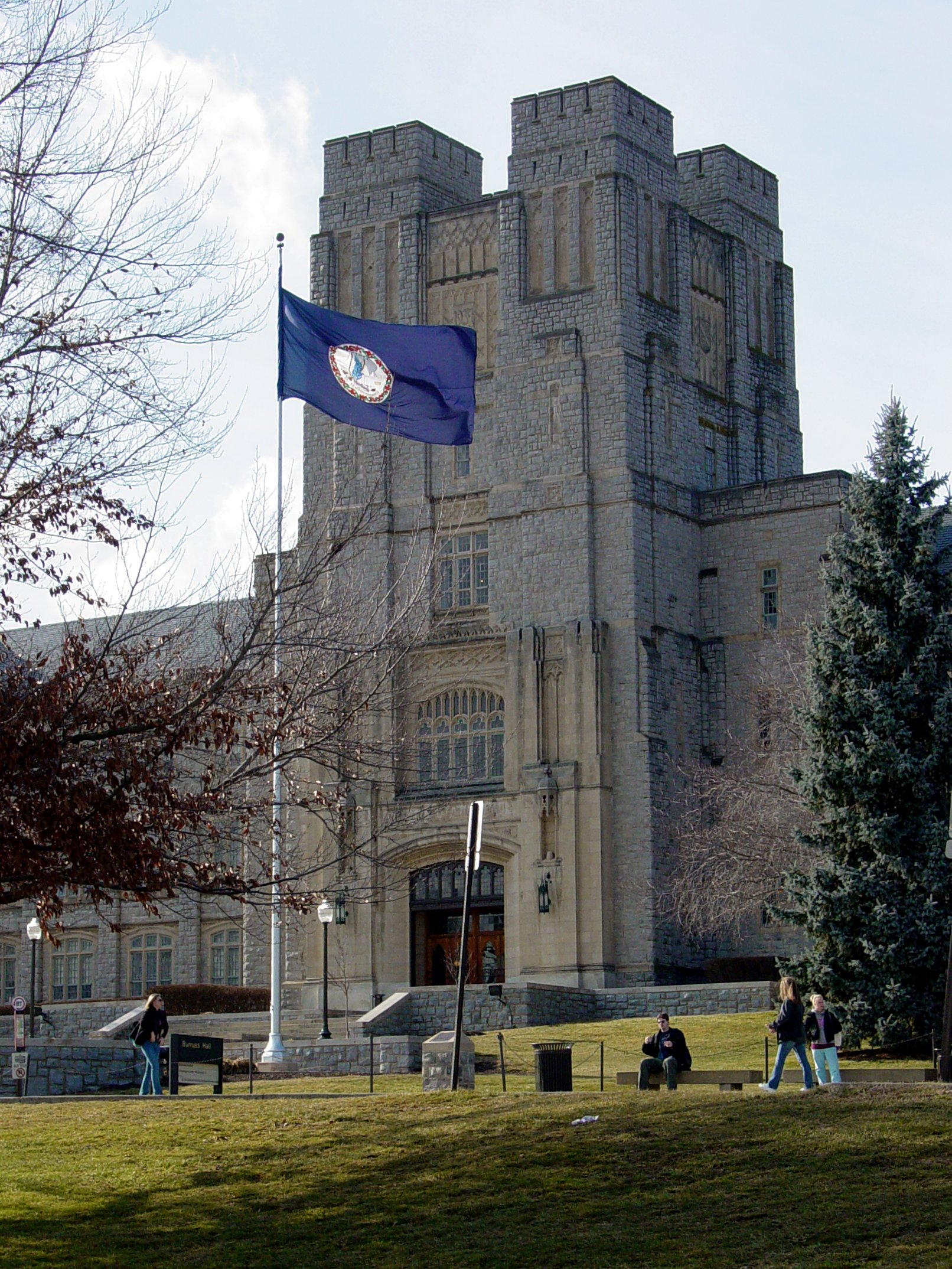
Burruss Hall — with Hokie Stone façade

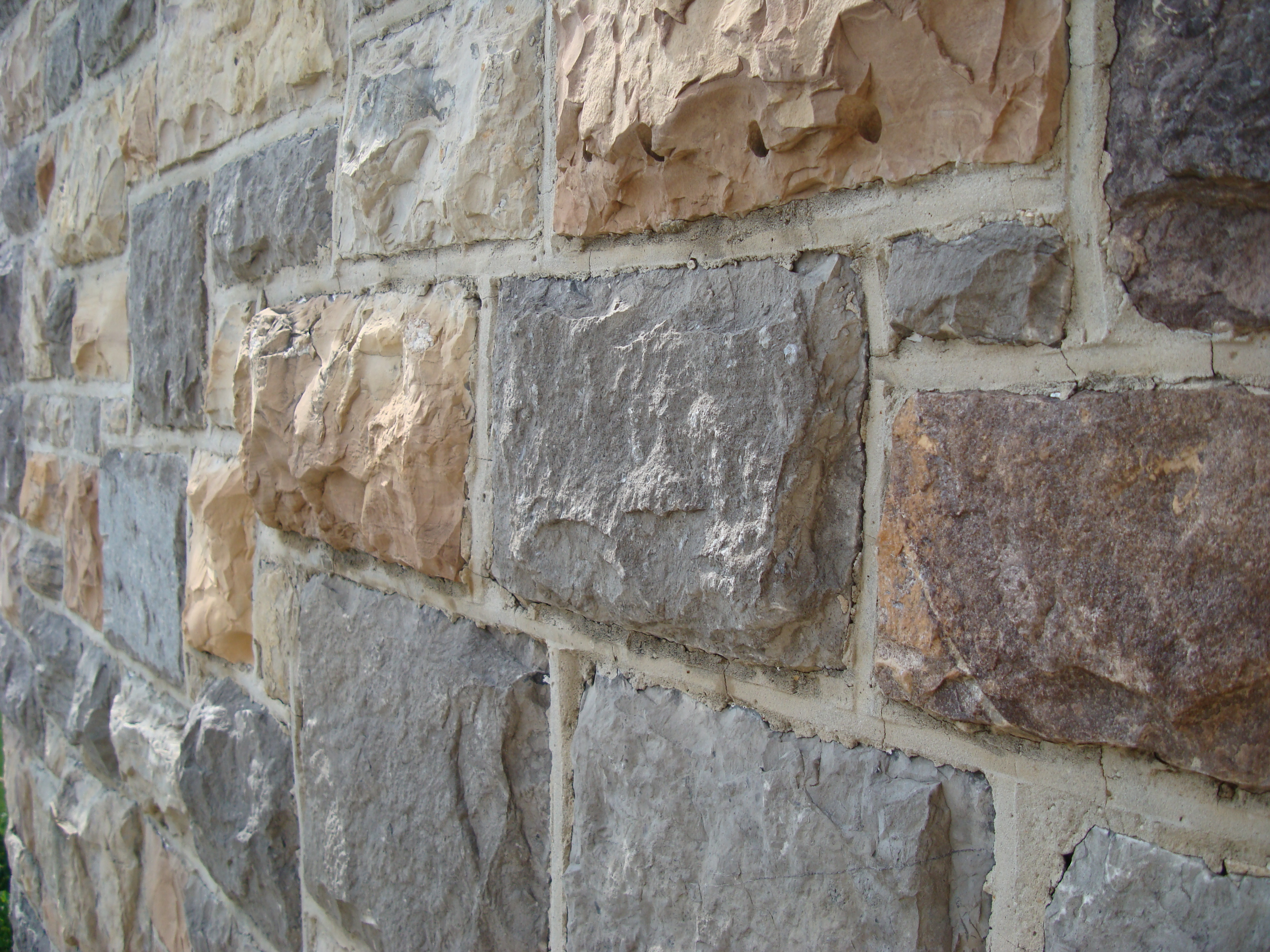
Hokie Stone façade detail, on O'Shaughnessy Hall

Hokie Stone is a grey dolomite-limestone rock found near Blacksburg, in western Virginia. It gets its name from the traditional nickname attributed to students and alumni of Virginia Tech.

Hokie Stone is quarried by Virginia Tech for campus projects and is prominently displayed on the majority of buildings throughout the Blacksburg campus.

== Geology ==
Hokie Stone is limestone infused with magnesium and calcium under intense pressure and temperature. Hokie Stone with impurities such as siltstone and sandstone is multi-colored and found on some newer Blacksburg campus structures.

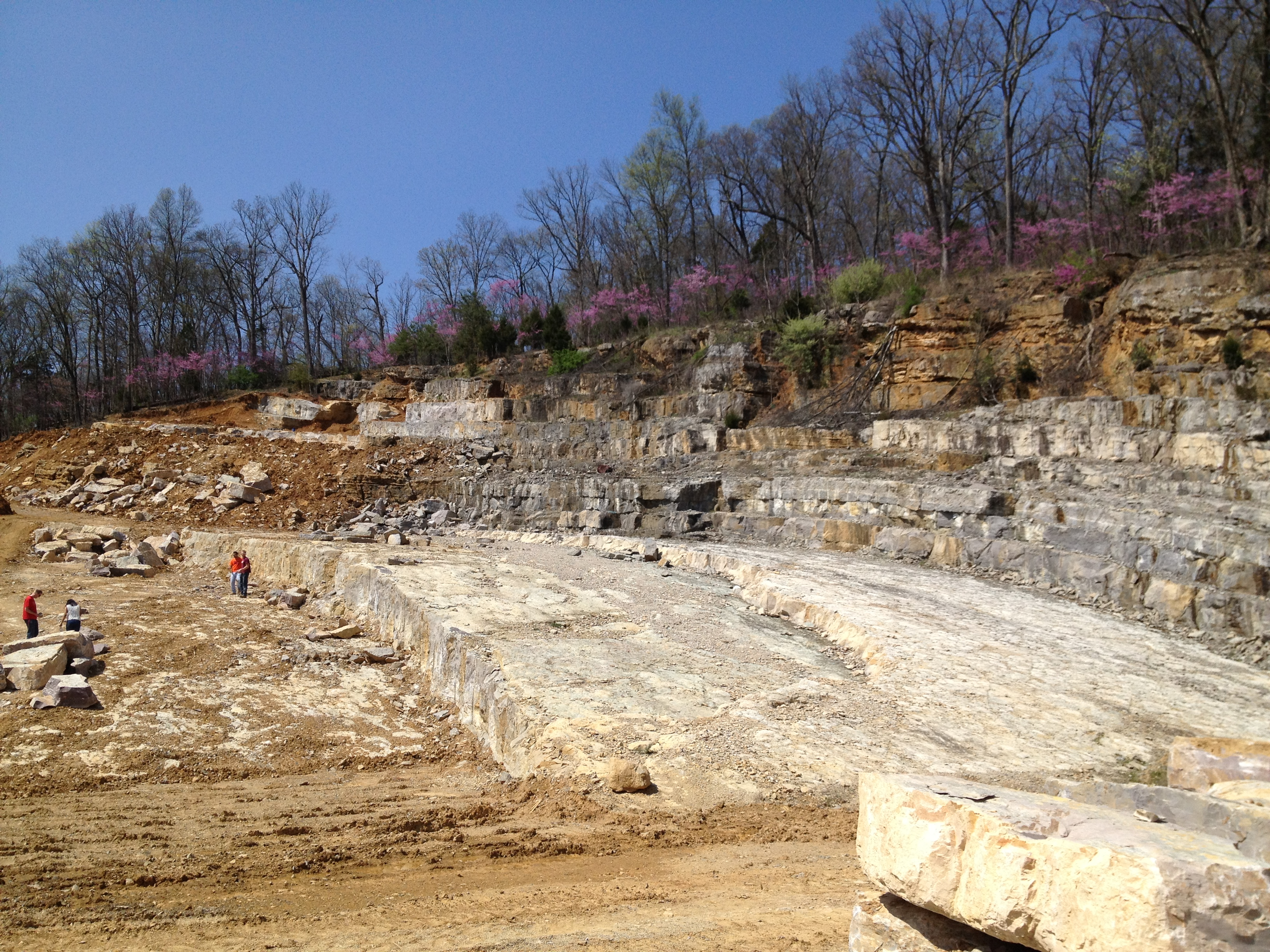
South slope of the main quarry in Blacksburg

== Quarry ==
Eighty percent of the stone is quarried from a 40-acre (160,000 m^{2}) Virginia Tech-owned quarry a few miles from campus near the Highland Park subdivision of Blacksburg, Virginia. Twenty-five to thirty Virginia Tech employees use black powder each day to dislodge the stone, cut it into block sizes required by campus construction projects and then finish the blocks by hand using hammers and chisels. In 2010 Virginia Tech upgraded the quarry equipment to reduce costs, including the purchase of a computer-driven saw. Hokie Stone from this quarry can only be sold to Virginia Tech.

The remaining 20% of stone, which is black, is mined once per year from an additional quarry located on a local farm near Lusters Gate. About 50 tons can be quarried each week. This university-owned quarry has been in operation since the 1950s.

== History ==
The native woodland Indians are believed to have made tools from Hokie Stone.

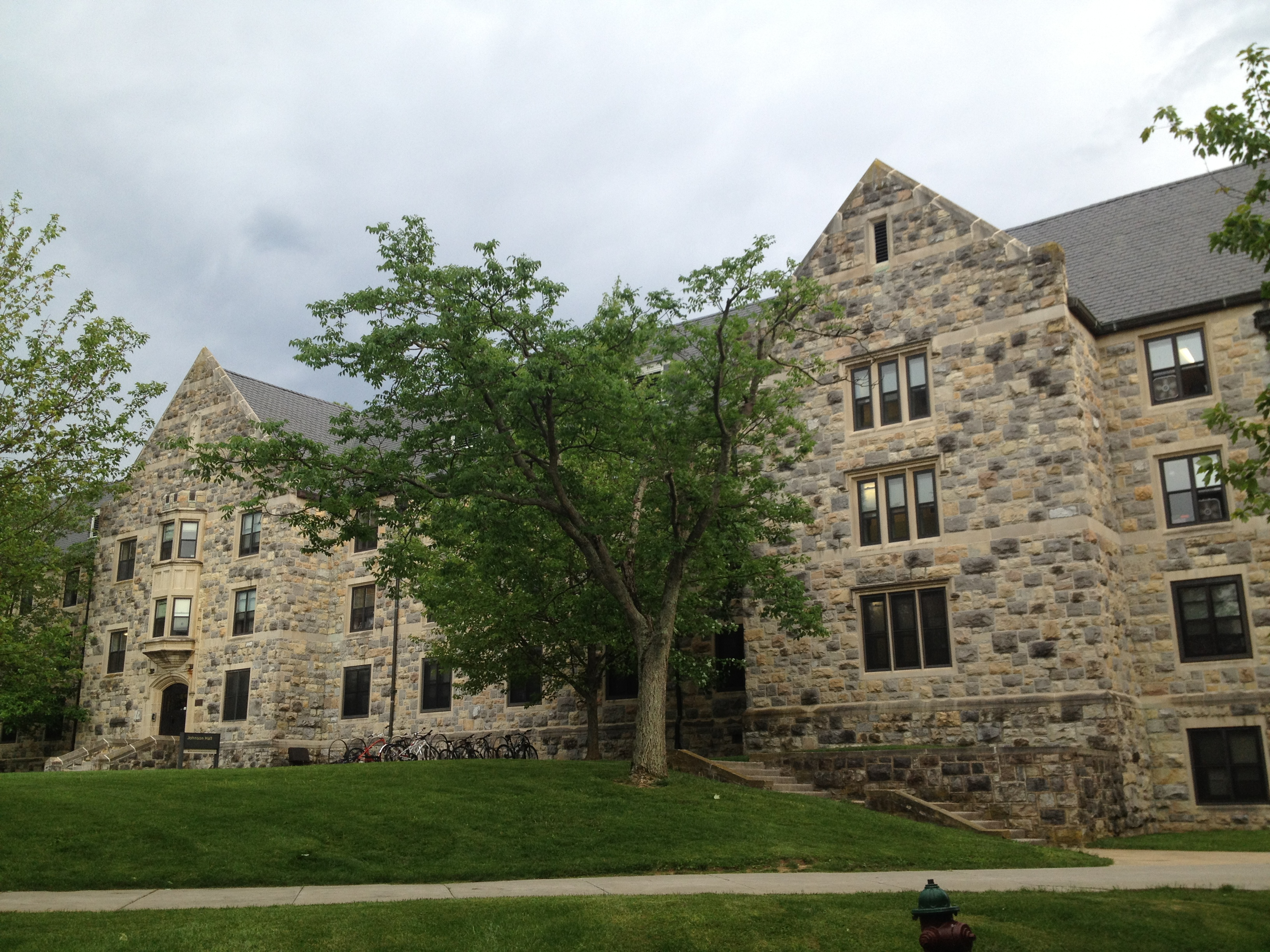
Use with Collegiate Gothic style on Johnson Hall

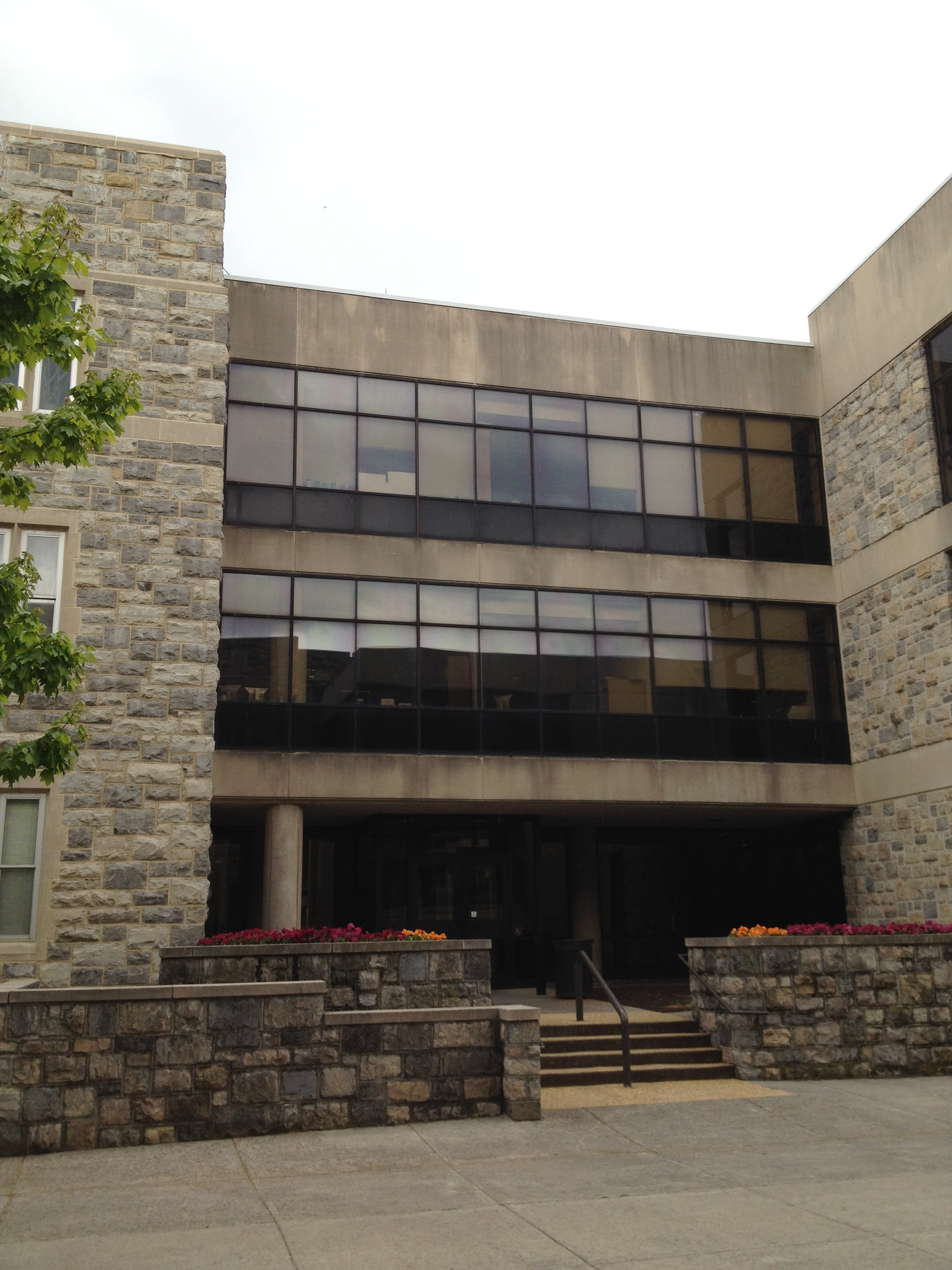
Use with modernist style on Pamplin Hall

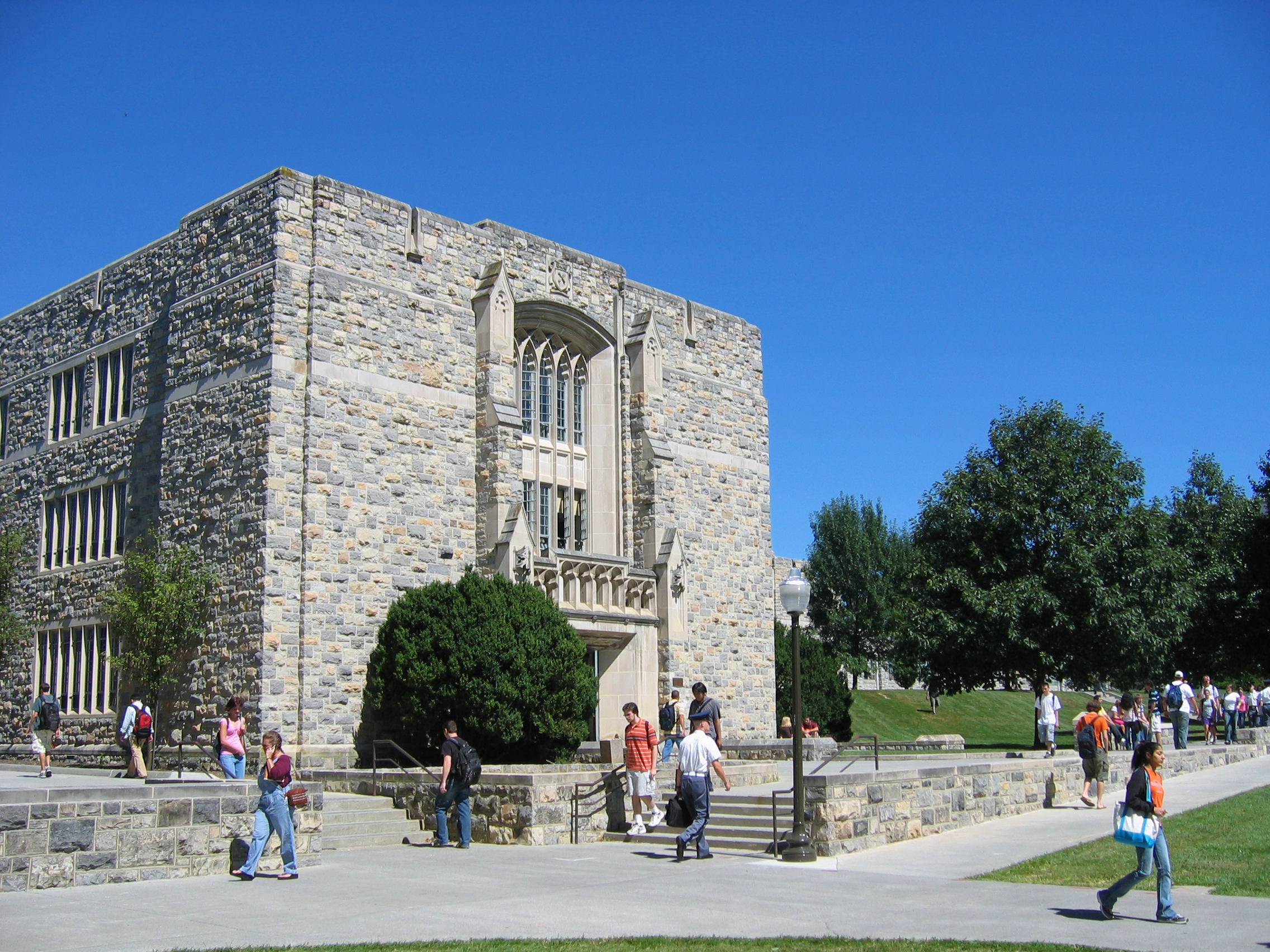
Norris Hall — with Hokie Stone façade

=== At Virginia Tech ===
==== Buildings ====
When the university was founded in 1872, buildings built in the Old Quad (now known as the Upper Quad) were red brick structures, reflecting the architecture of its first building, the Preston and Olin Building, a three-story red brick edifice constructed in 1855 for the Preston and Olin Institute. The first Hokie Stone was cut in 1899 for the YMCA Building (present day Performing Arts Building), the first to be constructed of it. V.P.I.'s first native-limestone-clad, neo-Gothic style building, known as The Chapel, was later constructed on the site where Newman Library stands today. Agricultural Hall or "Old Aggie" (now known as Price Hall) was built of the stone in 1907. In 1914, the first McBryde Hall introduced the Hokie Stone-clad Collegiate Gothic style, similar to great European universities. Originally designed as red brick building, McBryde Hall was clad in locally quarried stone because of a shortage of bricks due to military construction during World War I. The first stone dormitory, Main Campbell Hall, originally known as barracks No. 8 was built in 1930.

Between the late 1940s and the 1980s, a number of concrete and brick structures absent of Hokie Stone such as Hillcrest Hall, Shultz Hall (now known as the Moss Arts Center), Cowgill Hall, Litton Reaves Hall, Wallace Hall, Derring Hall (which ironically houses the geology department), the Cassell Coliseum and several residence halls on the Upper Quad were built. With the exception of Hillcrest Hall, which was built in the Gothic revival style in 1940 and clad in red brick, these were all modern structures and a radical departure from the architectural style of campus buildings built before World War II.

In 1975 the Tech Foundation bought the quarry from the local Cupp family. In 2010, the Virginia Tech Board of Visitors made it official policy that Hokie Stone be the predominant material in the facade of every new building on the Blacksburg central campus. Today each campus project uses an average of 1,500 tons of Hokie Stone, with each ton of stone covering about 35 square feet. The use of the local stone may add as much as $1 million to the cost of a new building.

==== Other uses ====
In addition to building exteriors, Hokie Stone is used in important monuments such as biographical markers outside each campus building providing a brief history of the person for whom the building is named. Thirty-two Hokie Stones were quarried by university stonemasons and engraved with the names of students and professors killed in the April 2007 school shooting. The memorial is a permanent version of one students spontaneously created using smaller stones. The Virginia Tech football team enters the playing field at Lane Stadium through a tunnel with an exit topped by a block of Hokie Stone which is touched by each player. In 2011, Virginia Tech offered Hokie Stone as an option for the centerpiece of class rings.

On September 26, 2013, the football team wore helmets decorated in a Hokie Stone motif for their game at Georgia Tech.

== Gallery ==
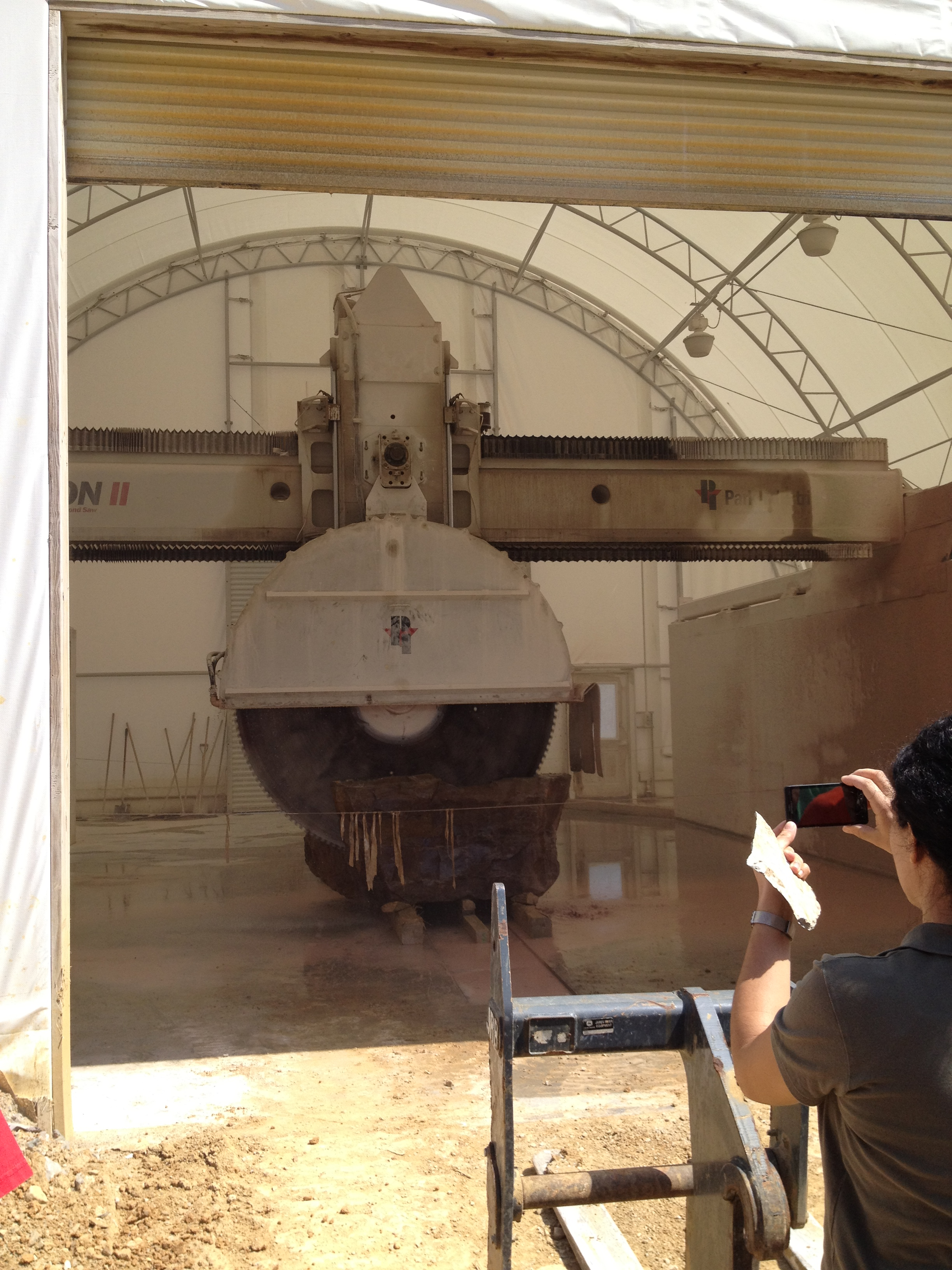
The saw that cuts Hokie Stone down to manageable sizes

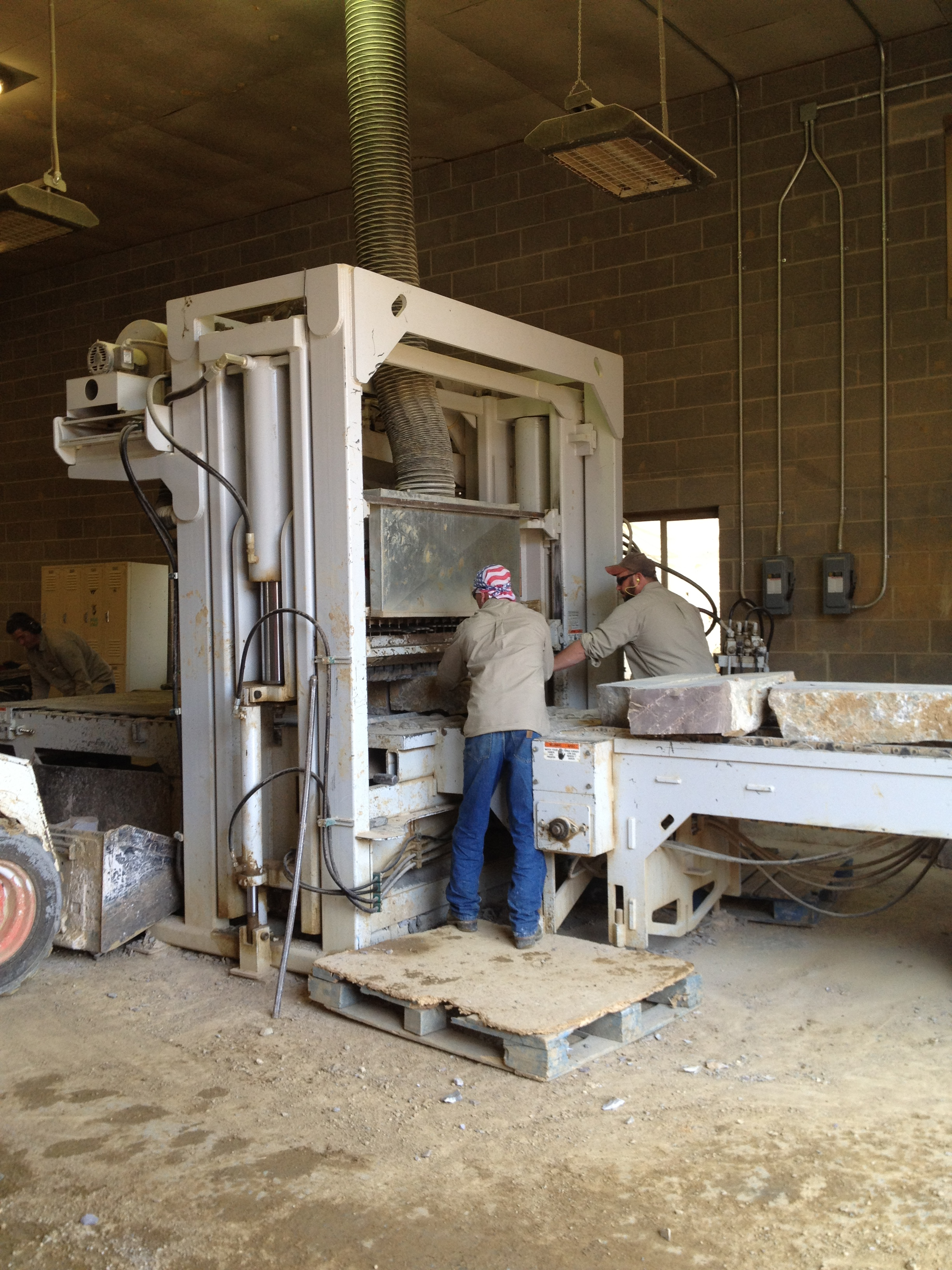
The breaker that breaks Hokie Stone to sizes that can be easily handled

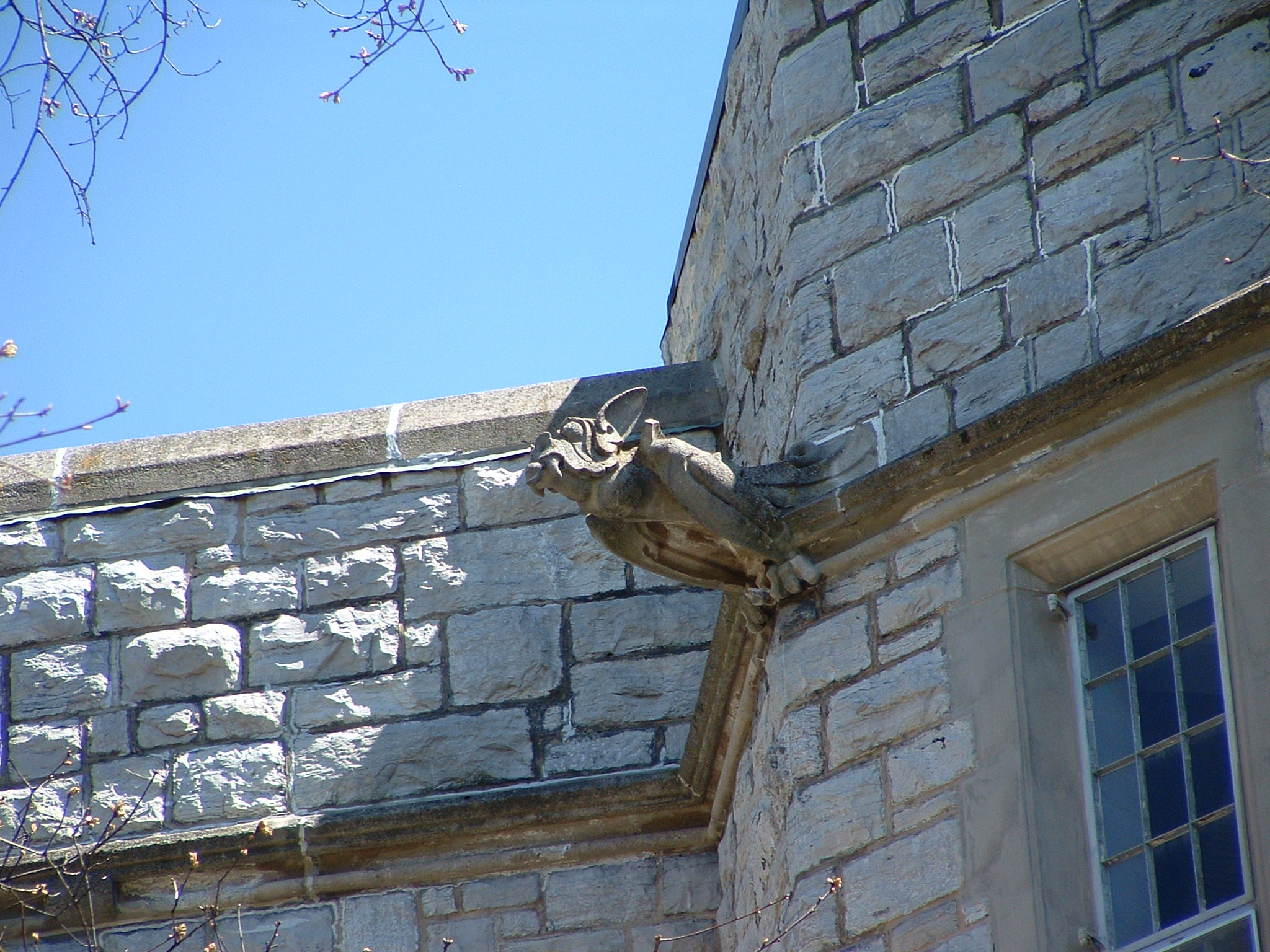
Hokie Stone surface detail view, with gargoyle

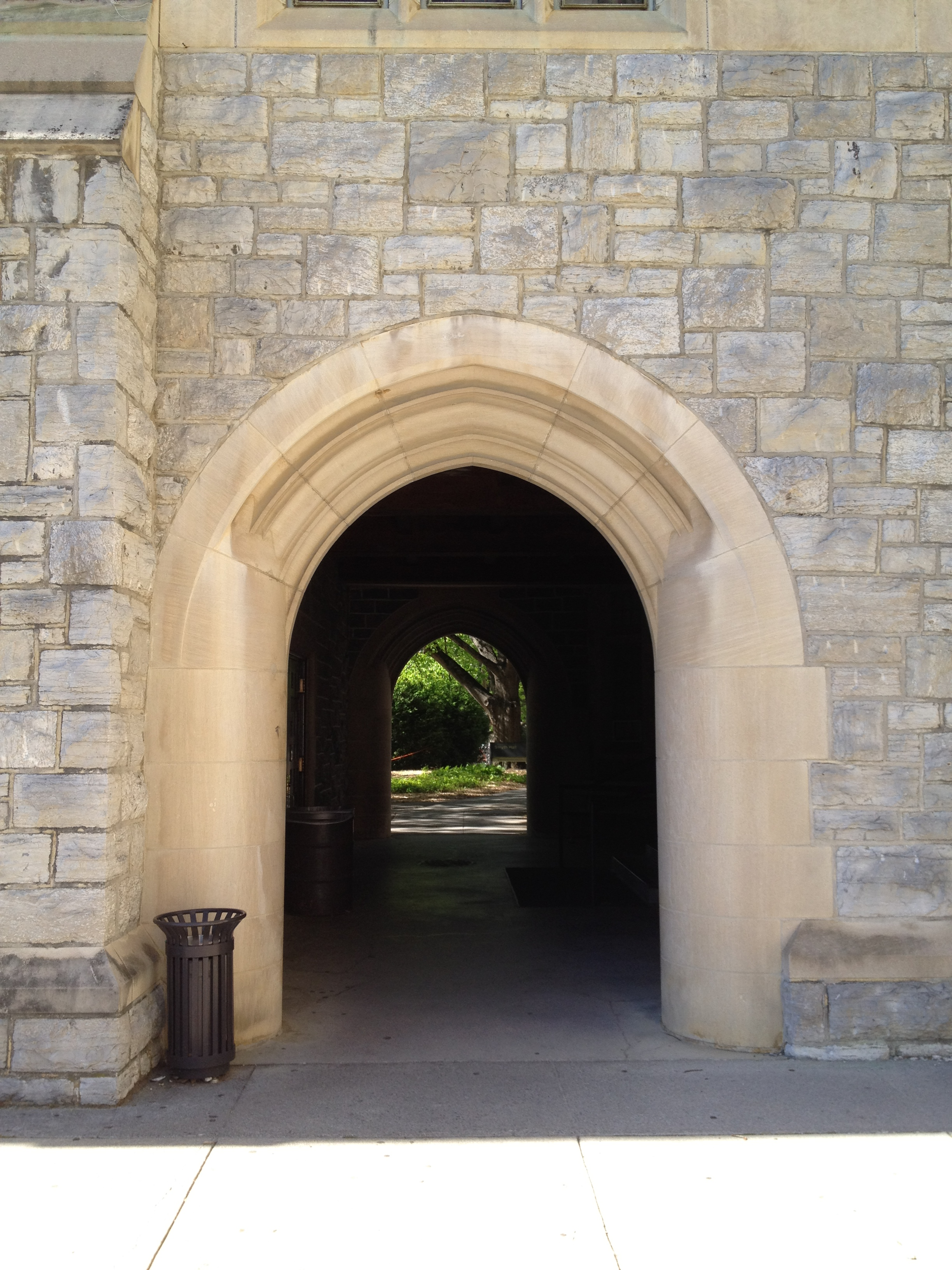
Hokie Stone framing an arch on campus

== See also ==
- Virginia Polytechnic Institute and State University — Virginia Tech.
  - Virginia Tech campus
  - Virginia Tech Hokies
- Collegiate Gothic in North America
- Limestone buildings
- List of types of limestone
