= Cladospongia alaskensis =

Cladospongia alaskensis Temporal range: 433.4–423.0 Ma

Scientific classification
- Kingdom: Animalia
- Phylum: Porifera
- Class: Demospongiae
- Order: Agelasida
- Family: †Preperonidellidae
- Genus: †Cladospongia; Rigby et al. 2008
- Species: †C. alaskensis

Binomial name
- †Cladospongia alaskensis Rigby et al. 2008

Extinct genus of sponges

Cladospongia is an extinct genus of sponges in the family Preperonidellidae from the Silurian period. The species C. alaskensis is from the Heceta Limestone Formation, on Prince of Wales Island, Southeastern Alaska.
