= Portland Admiralty Roach =

Rock type

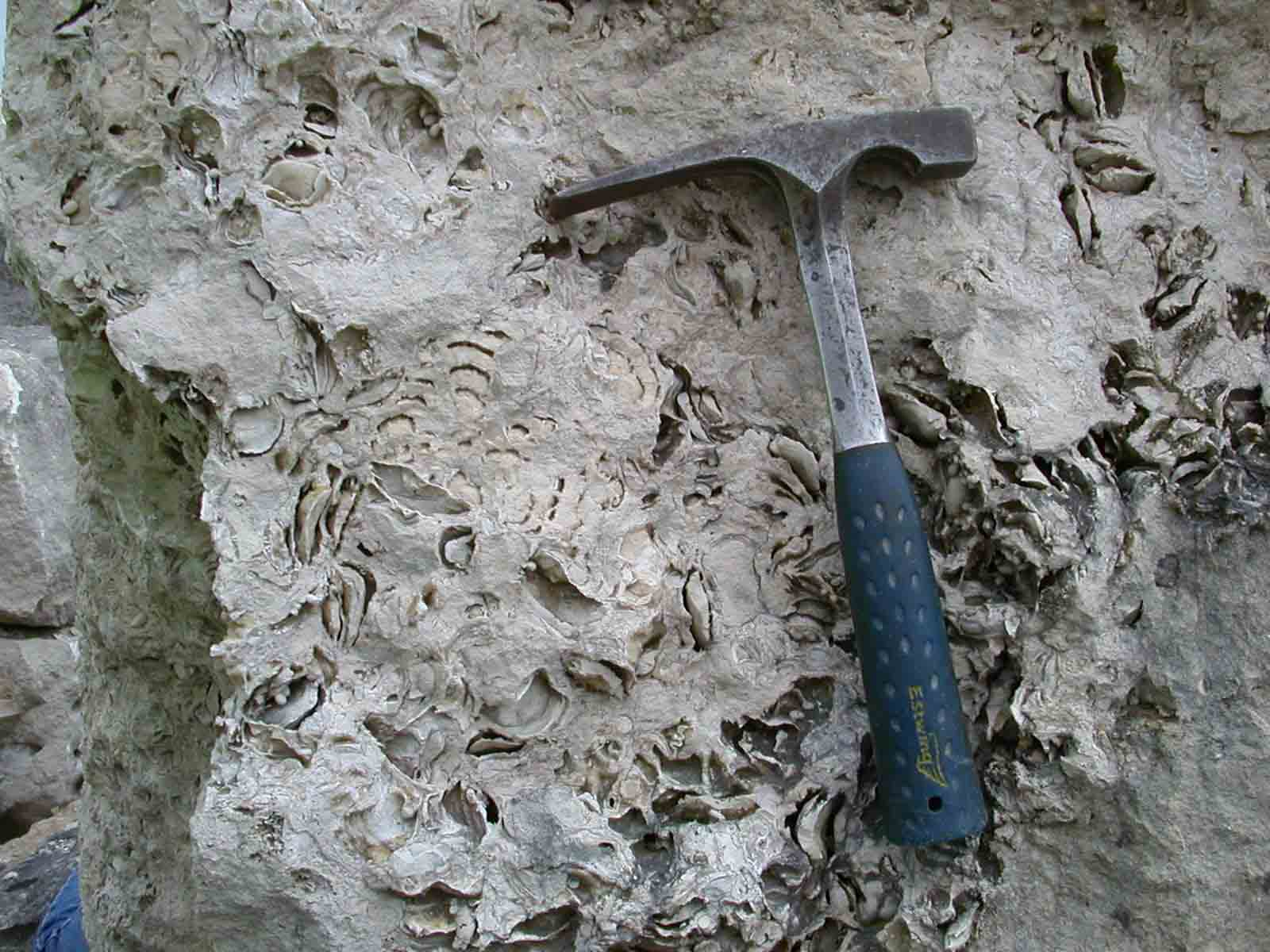
Portland Admiralty Roach from a quarry face on the Isle of Portland, Dorset.

Portland Admiralty Roach is a kind of stone from the Isle of Portland used to construct "The Cobb", the well-known seawall at Lyme Regis in Dorset. The stone is rich in fossils (known as shells to local masons) often consisting of almost fifty percent fossilized remains with an average size of approximately 35 mm. The stone, which was quarried by Albion Stone, has a maximum bed height of 2 metres. The stone is renowned for being highly frost resistant and being able to withstand the chemical effects of seawater. The stone is an open textured oolitic limestone from the Portlandian formation formed during the Tithonian age, (152.1 ± 4 Ma to 145.0 ± 4 Ma (million years ago)) of the Late Jurassic epoch. It is formed from ooliths in a micrite (fine grained calcium carbonate) matrix. There are many voids in the stone, caused by percolating rainwater dissolving all or parts of its many shell fossils, mainly bivalves and gastropods.

== See also ==
- List of stone
- List of types of limestone
- Portland stone
