= Charlestown limestone =

Limestone quarrying in Charlestown, Fife, Scotland

Charlestown limestone was quarried in Charlestown, Fife, Scotland. The limestone was fired in the kilns of the neighbouring village of Limekilns and ship from here along the east coast of Scotland. The limestone in this area produced lime of such a high quality that the lime was also exported as far afield as Canada.

These limestone workings have entrances which are situated along a quarry face, opposite the nearby water front and lead into sloping roads which lead to what was the working face.

Limestone removal was largely halted by 1937, although limestone was being quarried until 1957. During the second world war, production was halted to avoid the glow from the kilns providing a fixed geographical reference point for enemy pilots.

== See also ==
- List of types of limestone
