= Bueno =

Bueno may refer to:

== Places ==
- Bueno Brandão, a municipality in Brazil
- Bueno River, in Chile
- Río Bueno, Chile, a city and commune
- Rio Bueno (Jamaica), a river
- Rio Bueno, Jamaica, a settlement
- Pimenta Bueno, a municipality in Brazil
- Pimenta Bueno River, a river in Brazil

== Other ==
- Bueno (surname)
- Kinder Bueno, an Italian chocolate bar
- Poco Bueno, an American Quarter Horse stallion
- Taco Bueno, a U.S.-based fast-food restaurant chain
- Bueno (footballer) (born 1995), Wellington Daniel Bueno, Brazilian footballer

== See also ==
- Beuno (died 640), Welsh saint
