= Portoro Buono =

Italian decorative limestone

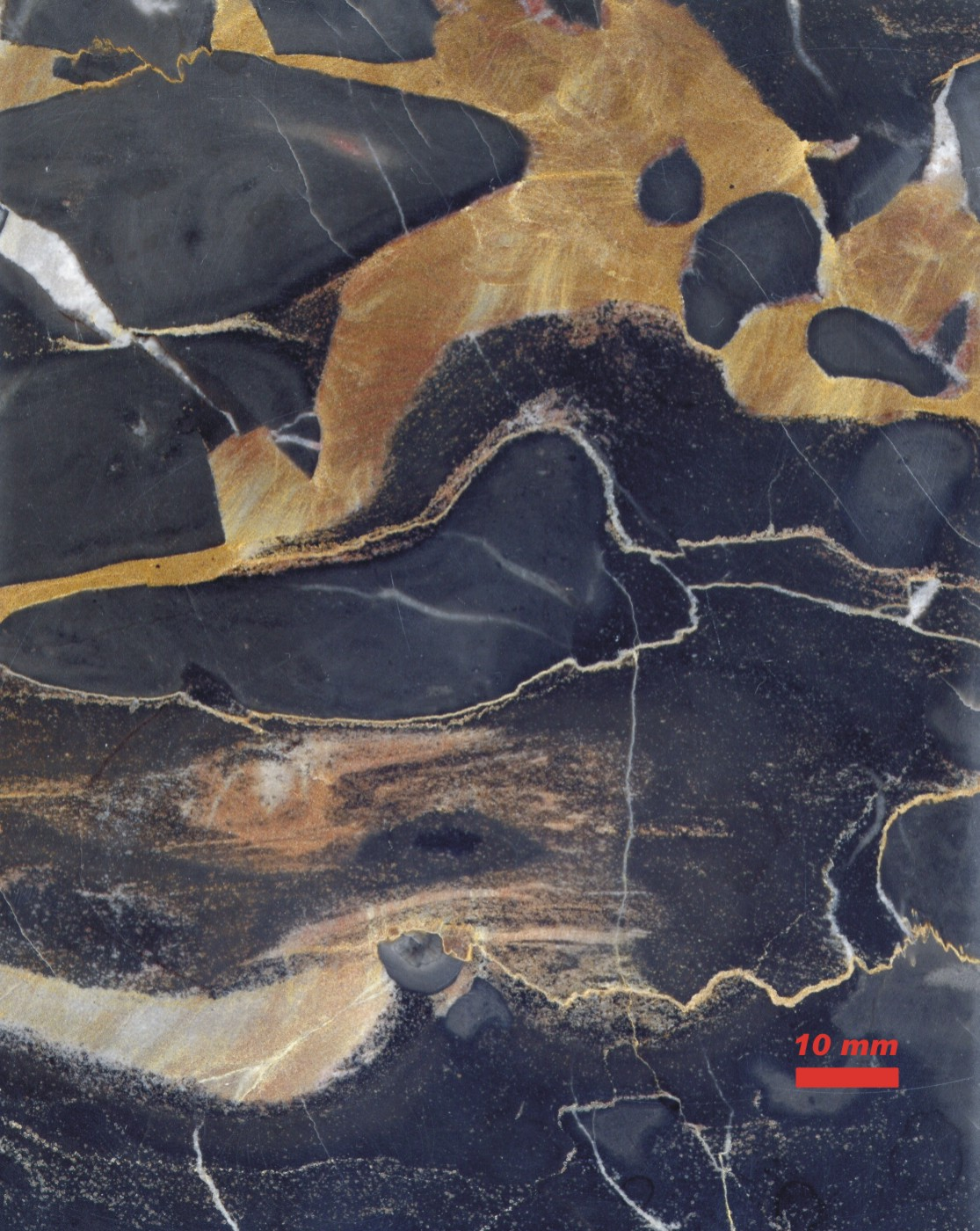
Jurassic limestone Nero Portoro, variety ″macchia fine″

Porto Buono or Nero Portoro is a decorative stone from Porto Venere, near Spezia, Liguria, Italy. It is a Jurassic golden or white veined black Limestone.

== See also ==
- List of stone
