= Bowers Quarry =

Quarry in Dorset, England

Coordinates: 50.5462°N 2.4482°W

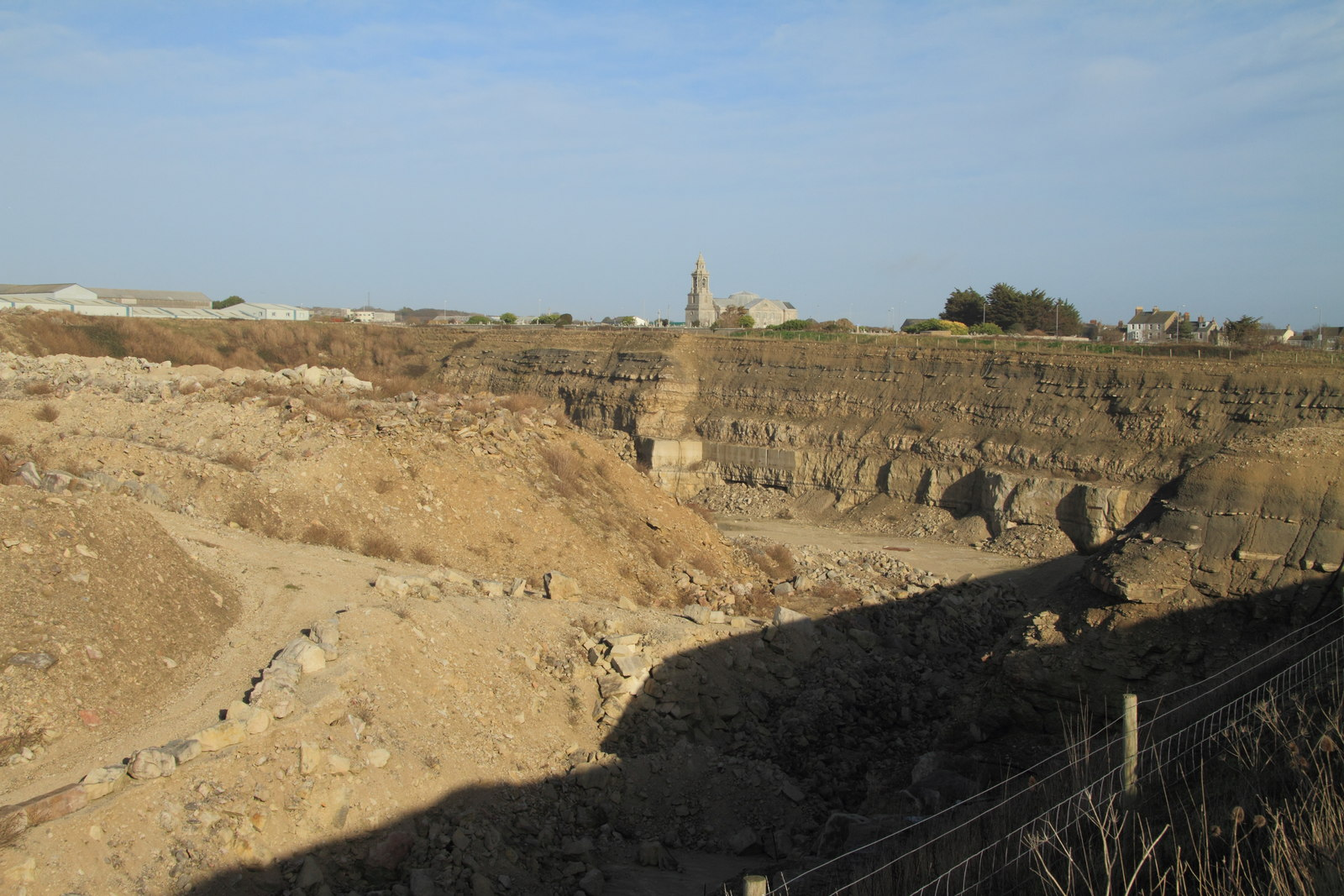
Bowers Quarry

Bowers Quarry/Mine is an active stone quarry on the west side of the Isle of Portland, Dorset, England. The quarry is operated by Albion Stone and became the site of the first Portland stone mine. In October 2002 the firm successfully initiated Portland's first ever underground mining operation, which was a precursor to Jordans Mine, which would start in 2008. It has also been the selected site for the planned Mass Extinction Memorial Observatory.

== History ==
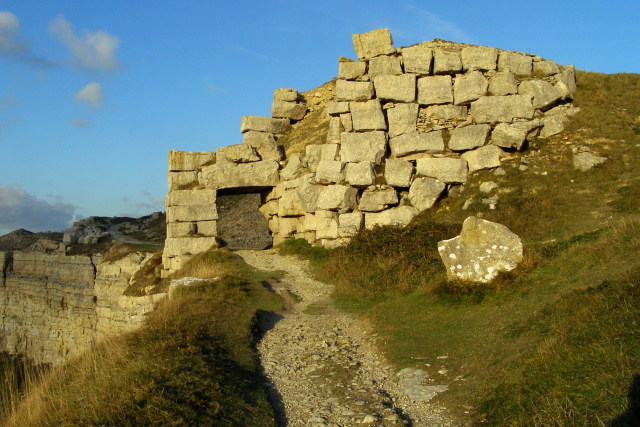
A remaining stone tipping bridge on the western cliff-tops, close to Bowers Quarry.

The quarry has been in operation since the late 1700s, when it was made up of various small individual family run quarries. In 1979 Albion Stone secured the lease for the quarry from the Crown Estate. From this time the quarry gradually extended south towards the Weston Estate. Bowers had long become a deep quarry and, as a result of an 8-metre stand-off of untouched ground alongside the boundary and the gentle slope of up to 15 metres of overburden above the Portland Stone beds, a significant quantity of dimension stone was to be potentially wasted alongside the boundary.

In 1998 the firm received planning permission for the first Portland Stone trial mine at Bowers Quarry. As an experiment, the mining technique was to reduce the environmental impact of the stone industry on Portland. The Bowers Mine trials began in 2002, and were completed in 2005. In the spring of 2006 the High Wall extraction in Bowers Quarry commenced. The extraction from Bowers Quarry today is completely underground through mining. Bowers is largely quarried for Bowers Roach, Whitbed and Basebed. In 2005 Albion Stone revealed a new mining plan for the Jordans Quarry, which started in 2008 and was also a success.

In 2013, Dorset County Council approved a new planning application, allowing Albion Stone to extend the existing mine under the playing fields to the south. The ground is now on a long lease from the county to Albion Stone and new portals have been dug into the faces of Bowers Quarry to access the extended area. These reserves of Portland stone are estimated to last 20–30 years. As part of the application, a phased restoration plan has been agreed covering the entire quarry.

In 2006 the MEMO project was established by Sebastian Brooke. The project aims to create a Mass Extinction Memorial Observatory on the western clifftops at Portland - at Bowers Quarry. The monument is to pay homage to the world's extinct species. The lease for the site was successfully agreed with the Crown Estate, and the project given the go-ahead by Weymouth and Portland Borough Council. As part of the project, almost half of Bowers Quarry is to be restored to limestone grassland. The costs of MEMO have been estimated at being £20-£25 million, with fundraising efforts continuing to date. Once open, the attraction will generate funds by charging an entry fee of up to £9 and it is expected to attraction 140,000 annual visitors within three years of launch.

In August–September 2012 Pierre Sauvegeot's Harmonic Fields, an ensemble of more than 500 instruments played by the wind, was set up near the cliff-edge within a disused section of Bowers Quarry. Harnessing the natural energy of the wind, the orchestra of instruments created a symphonic soundscape. Harmonic Fields was part of the London 2012 Festival, a 12-week nationwide celebration bringing together artists from across the world with those in the UK.
