= Portland Bowers Roach =

Portland Bowers Roach is a type of limestone from the Isle of Portland in Dorset, southern England, on the Jurassic Coast, a World Heritage Site.

Bowers Roach was used to construct parts of Broadcasting House, situated in Portland Place, London.

== See also ==
- Bowers Basebed
- Portland stone
