= Portland Jordans Roach =

Stone variety from the Isle of Portland

Portland Jordans Roach is a type of stone from the Isle of Portland used to construct parts of the refurbished "Green Park Tube Station", which is situated in London. The stone is a shelly roach. Jordans Roach has a maximum bed height of 2 metres (6 ft 7 in) and is a roach in which the shelliest parts seem to be towards the middle of the block.
