= Bowers Basebed =

Portland Bowers Basebed is a type of limestone from Bowers Quarry at the Isle of Portland in Dorset, southern England, on the Jurassic Coast, a World Heritage Site.

The stone is clear of fossils and is the cleanest of the Portland stone types. Bowers Basebed, which is quarried by Albion Stone, has a maximum bed height of 1.95 metres. It is known for being highly durable and being able to withstand the effects of weathering.

Bowers Basebed was used to construct "7–10 Old Bailey", in the city of London.

== See also ==
- Portland Bowers Roach
- Portland stone
