= NIST stone test wall =

Coordinates: 39.12245°N 77.22075°W

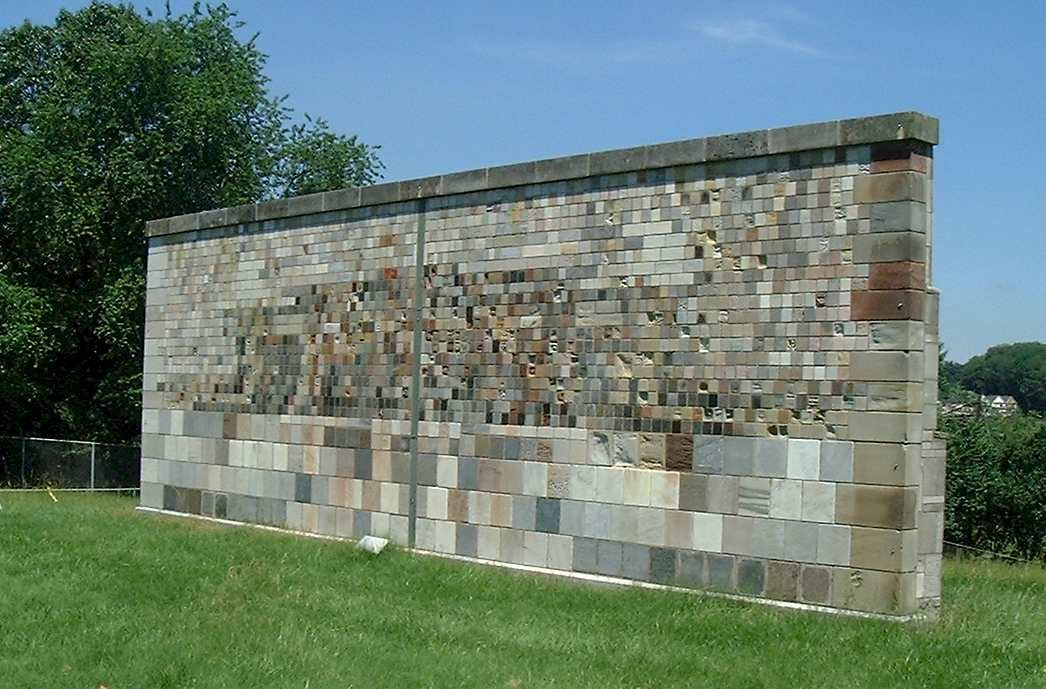
The NIST stone test wall.

The NIST stone test wall is an experiment by the United States National Institute of Standards and Technology to determine how different types of construction stone weather. It includes 2352 samples of stone from 47 US states and 16 countries. The wall measures approximately 12 m long, 4 m high, 0.6 m thick at the bottom, and 0.3 m at the top.

It includes varieties of andesite, argillite, basalt, bluestone, breccia, conglomerate, coquina, coral, dacite, diabase, diorite, dolomite, gabbro, gneiss, granite, granodiorite, greenstone, labradorite, limestone, marble, melaphyre, pitchstone, pumice, pyrophyllite, quartz, quartzite, sandstone, schist, serpentinite, shellstone, soapstone, syenite, travertine, and tuff.

The wall was built by one stonemason, Vincent Di Benedeto, in 1948. He used two types of stone-setting mortar on the front. He used both a 1:3 lime mortar, with a high calcium hydrate and a 1:0.4:3 portland cement, whiting, and sand mortar.

The wall was moved from its original location in Washington, D.C. to Gaithersburg, Maryland in May 1977.
