= Belgian marble =

Belgian marble is the name given to limestone extracted in Wallonia, southern Belgium.

It is quarried around the cities of Namur, Dinant, Tournai, Basecles, Theux, and Mazy/Golzinne.

== Description ==
The rock is actually not a true marble (a metamorphic rock), but a type of limestone (a calcareous sedimentary rock).

Belgian marbles are available in solid dark greys or blacks; and in polychromes of red, grey, and/or pink. After polishing slabs with several colors exhibit natural decorative patterns.

=== Named selections ===
Named Belgian marbles include:

- Rouge Belge: including Rouge de Rance, Rouge Royal.
- Noir Belge: including Noir de Golzinne, Noir de Mazy.

== History ==
Belgian marble has been quarried, cut, and finished as a building stone, stone cladding, and stone veneer since the Ancient Roman era, in Roman Gaul and Rome, such as in the Basilica of Junius Bassus. It has been used in important European religious and secular buildings since the Renaissance, including the Palazzo Pitti and Palace of Versailles.

== See also ==
- List of types of limestone
- Dimension stone
