= Rance =

Rance may refer to:

== Places ==
- Rance (river), northwestern France
- Rancé, a commune in eastern France, near Lyon
- Ranče, a small settlement in Slovenia
- Rance, Wallonia, part of the municipality of Sivry-Rance
  - Rouge de Rance, a Devonian red reef limestone prized as a building material

== People ==
=== Given name ===
- Rance Allen (born 1948), American gospel musician
- Rance Hood (born 1941), Native American painter
- Rance Howard (1928–2017), American actor
- Rance Mulliniks (born 1956), American baseball player
- Rance Pless (1925–2017), American baseball player

=== Surname ===
- Alex Rance (born 1989), Australian rules footballer
- Charlie Rance (1889–1966), English footballer
- Dean Rance (born 1991), English footballer
- Hubert Rance (1898–1974), last governor of British Burma
- Murray Rance (born 1962), Australian rules footballer
- Patrick Rance (1918–1999), cheesemonger considered responsible for saving many British specialist cheeses from extinction
- Seth Rance (born 1987), New Zealand cricketer

== Other uses ==
- Rance (series), a Japanese video game series by AliceSoft

== See also ==
- Armand Jean le Bouthillier de Rancé (1626–1700), French abbot and founder of the Trappist Cistercians
- Rance Tidal Power Station on the estuary of the Rance River in Brittany
- RANS (disambiguation)
