= List of types of marble =

Here is a list of various types of marble according to location.

Marble-like stone which is not true marble according to geologists is included and indicated by italics, with geologic classification given as a footnote.

== Africa ==
=== Algeria ===
- Greco Scritto

=== Egypt ===
- Galala Marble
- Sinai Pearl Marble
- Milly Grey Marble
- Sunny Marble
- Alabaster Marble
- Shanghi Marble
- Eleuigion Marble
- Lepuretya Marble

=== Ethiopia ===
- Daleti marble, Western Welega: white, white with grey veins and other colours
- Enda Tikurir marble, Western Tigray
- Newi marble, Central Tigray
- Akmara marble, Central Tigray
- Dichinamo marble, Western Tigray

=== Tunisia ===
- Giallo antico, also known as Numidian marble (marmor numidicum in Latin), a yellow marble quarried in Roman times from the area of Chemtou, ancient Simmithu

== Asia ==
=== China ===
- Hàn Bái Yǜ Marble (Chinese: 汉白玉), type of white marble used in China for building and sculpting

=== India ===
- Indian Onyx Marble
- Jaisalmer Yellow Marble
- Jhiri Marble (white)
- Katni Marble
- Makrana Marble
- Morwad White Marble
- Udaipur Green Marble

== Europe ==
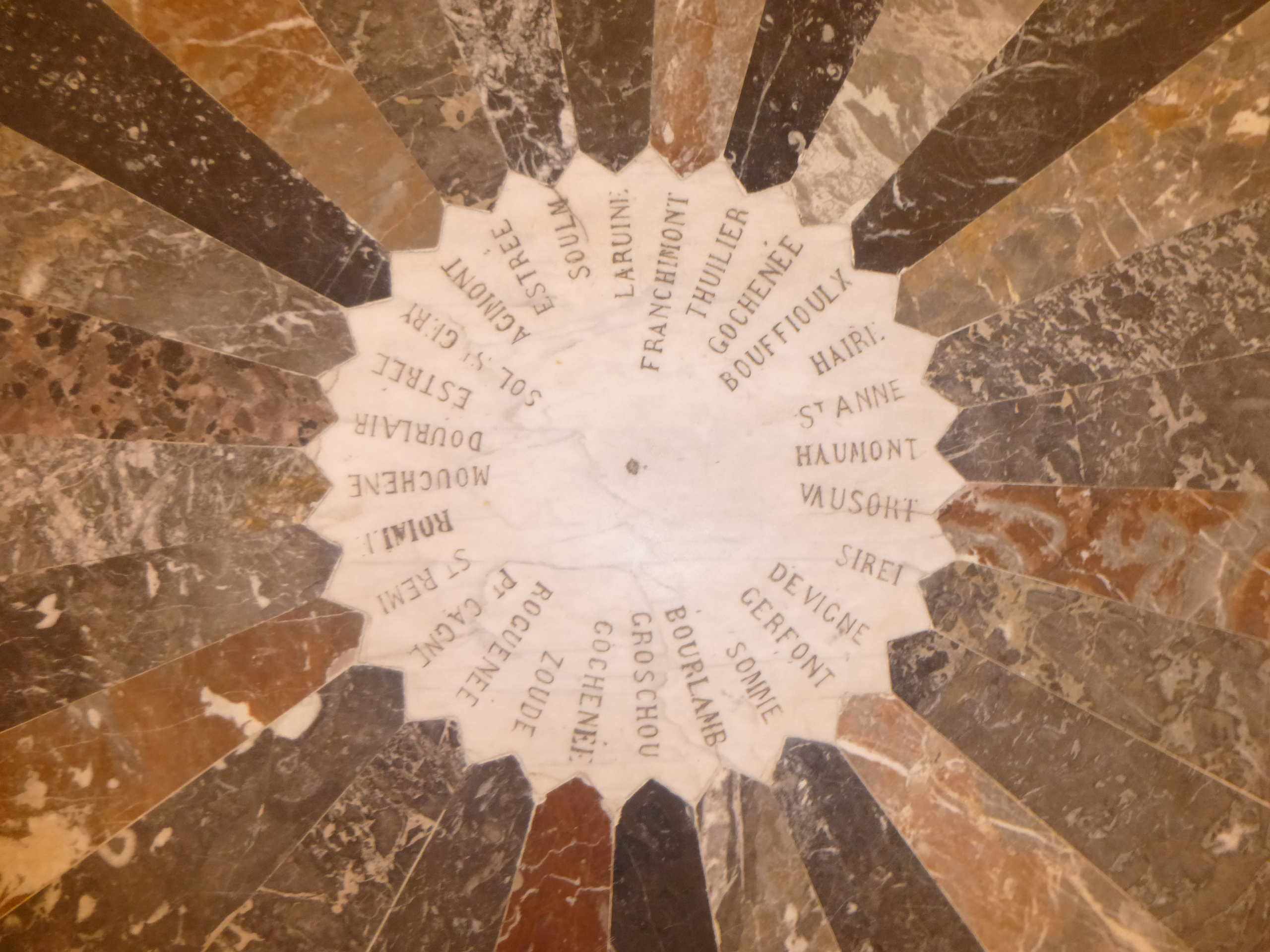
Marble star composed of various types of Belgian marble, Brussels

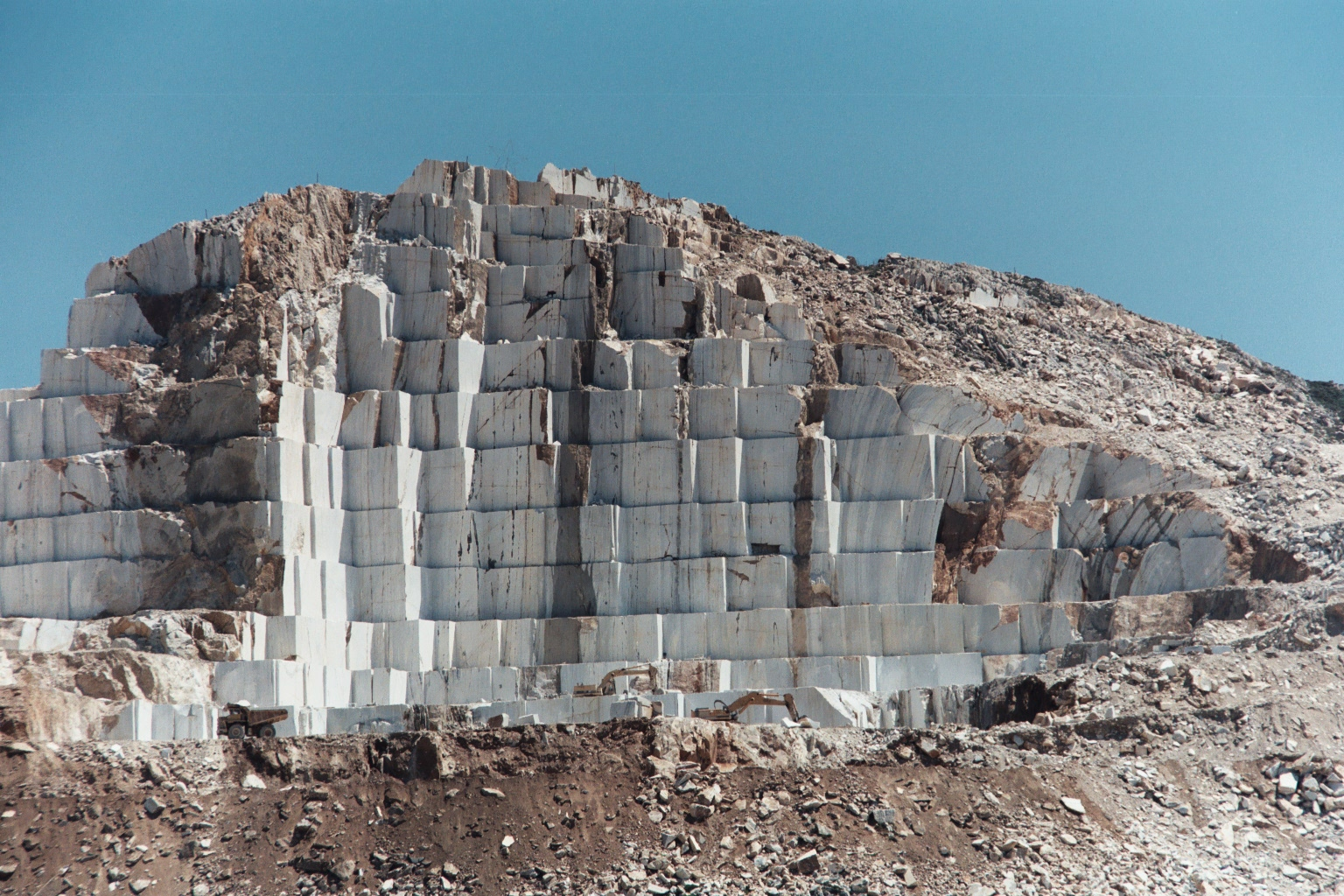
Marble quarry in Naxos, Greece

=== Belgium ===
- Griotte (Note: reef limestone)
- Rouge de Rance (Note: reef limestone)
- Noir Belge (Note: limestone)
- Noir de Golzinne (Note: limestone)

=== Czech Republic ===
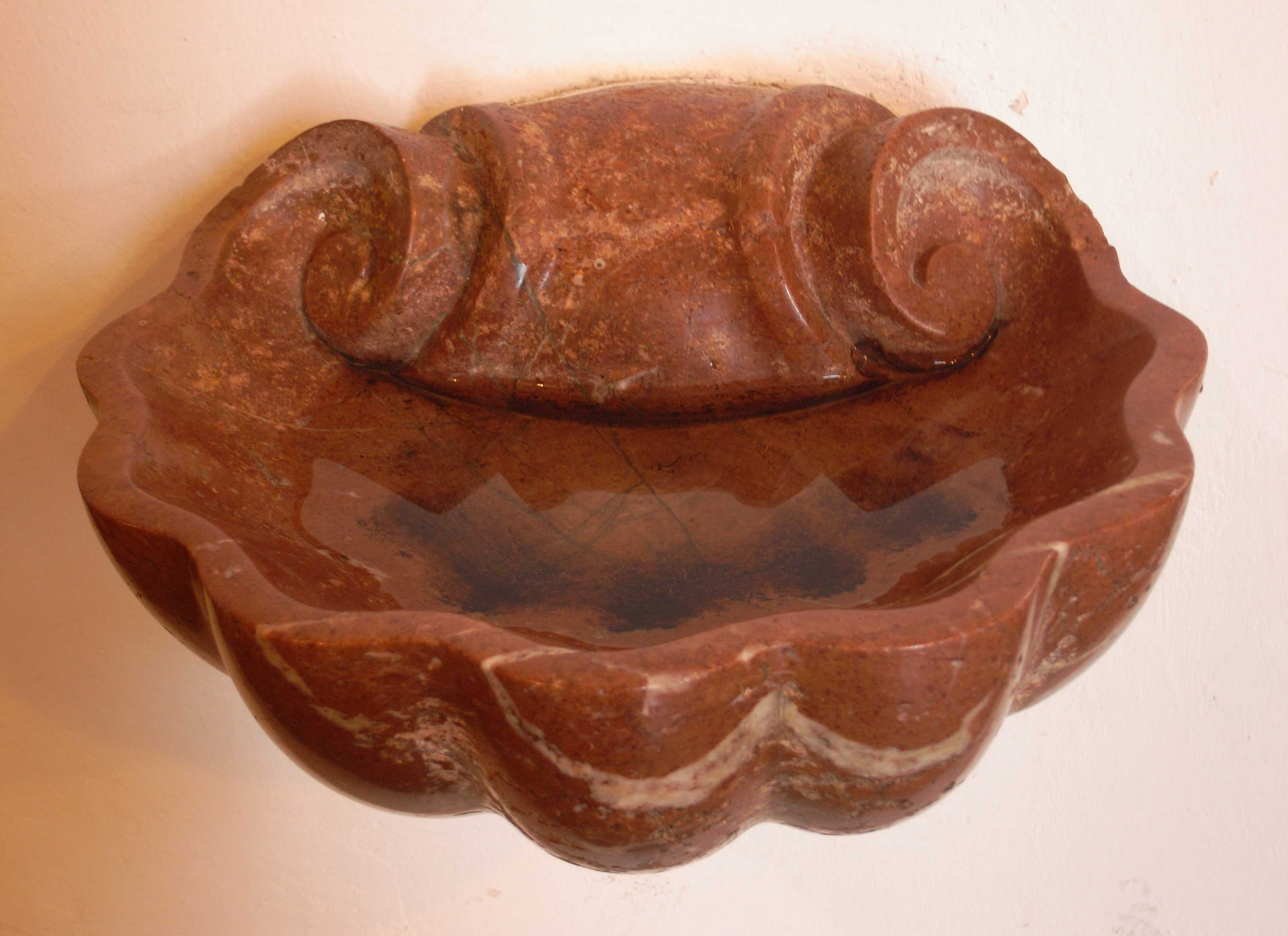
A stoup from brown Slivenec marble in the church in Dobřichovice

- Český Šternberk marble (šternberský mramor) from Český Šternberk, Benešov District: white
- Pernštejn marble (pernštejnský mramor) from Nedvědice, Brno-Country District: white
- Nehodiv marble (nehodivský mramor) from Nehodiv, Klatovy District: grey
- Lipová marble (lipovský mramor) from Horní Lipová, Jeseník District: dark and light-coloured
- Sněžník marble (sněžníkovský mramor) from Horní Morava, Ústí nad Orlicí District: light-coloured
- Supíkovice marble (supíkovický mramor) from Supíkovice, Jeseník District: grey-white

Marble mis-nomers:

- Cetechovice marble (cetechovický mramor) from Cetechovice, Kroměříž District: coloured (Note: limestone)
- Karlík marble (karlický mramor), from Barrandien, Karlík, Prague-West District: black with gold-yellow-colour veins (Note: limestone)
- Podol marble (Podolský mramor), from Vápenný Podol, Chrudim District: white, grey-white, rosy (Note: upper Devonian limestone)
- Křtiny marble (křtinský mramor) from Křtiny, Blansko District: grey, rosy, reddish (Note: Devonian limestone, occasionally limestone breccia)
- Slivenec marble (slivenecký mramor), from Barrandien, Slivenec and Radotín (Cikánka, Horní Kopanina, Na Špičce, Hvížďalka quarries), Prague: reddish, rose, brown, grey, spotted with veins (Note: limestone, occasionally limestone breccia: From old times quarried by the Knights of the Cross with the Red Star order which received the Slivenec village in 1253 from Wenceslaus I Přemyslid, the Bohemian king. In 1923, the order sold the quarries to a private company.)

=== France ===
- Griotte

=== Germany ===
- Auerbach marble
- Crottendorf marble
- Saalburg violet
- Wunsiedel Marble

=== Greece ===
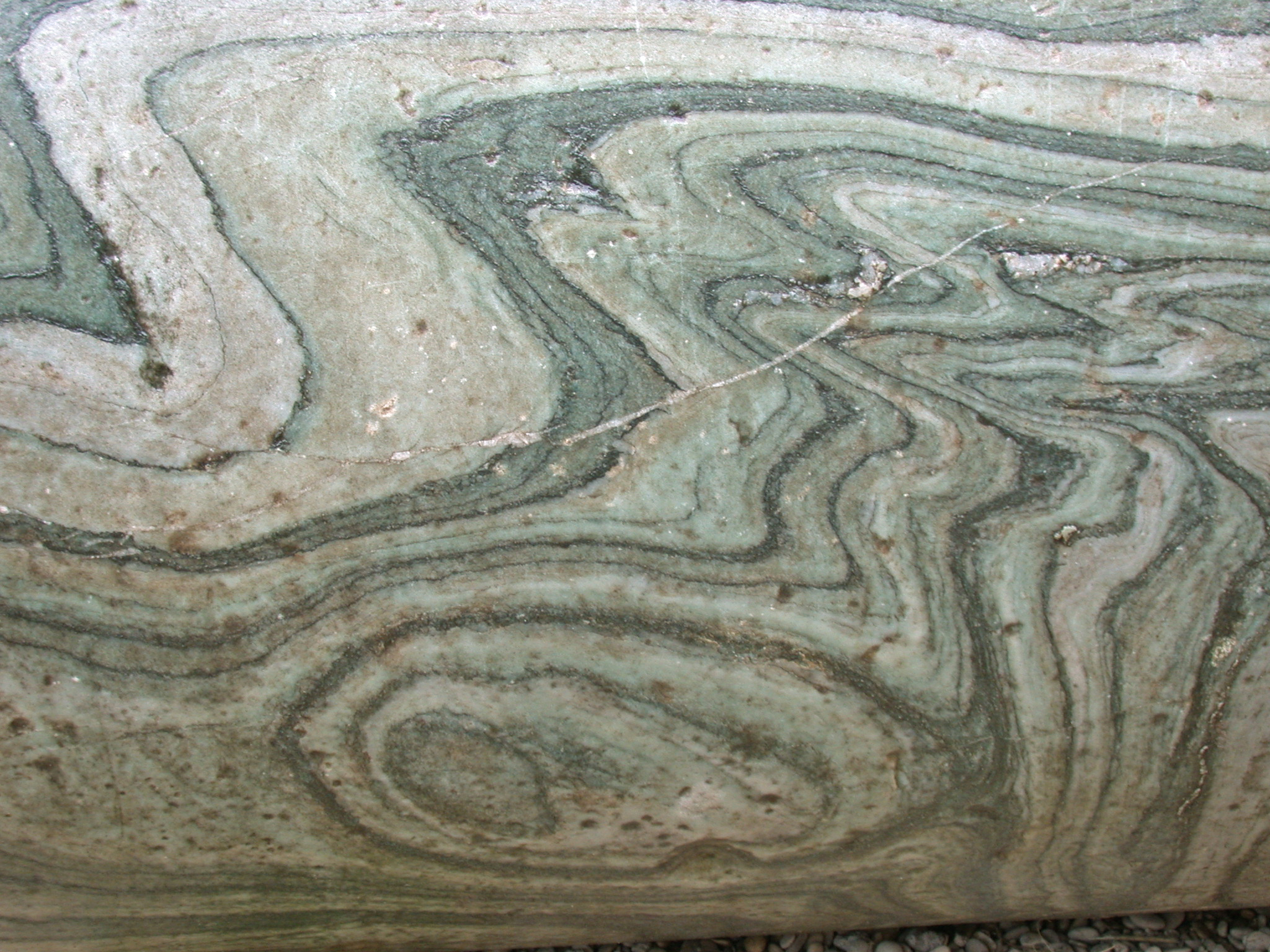
Cipollino

- Cipollino or Karystian marble, or Styron Evia Green, near Styra on the island Euboea (silicate marble)
- Hymettus marble
- Parian marble
- Pentelic marble
- Skyros breccia
- Thassos marble
- Portosanta marble

=== Ireland ===
- Connemara marble, a serpentine marble
- Kilkenny marble

=== Italy ===
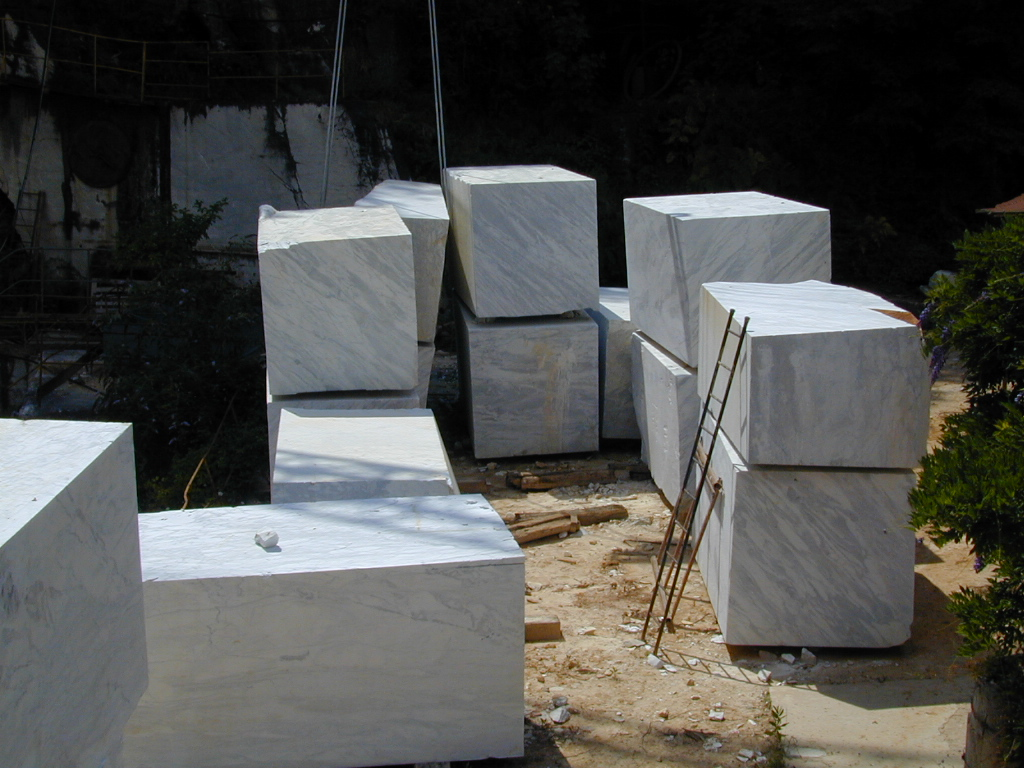
Blocks of Carrara marble in Italy

- Arabescato marble
- Calacatta marble
- Carrara marble
- Candoglia marble
- Lasa marble
- Red Verona marble (Note: nodular, fossiliferous limestone)
- Rosso di Levanto marble (Note: serpentinite, occasionally ophicalcite)
- Siena marble
- Bardiglio

=== North Macedonia ===
- Sivec (Bianco Sivec)

=== Norway ===
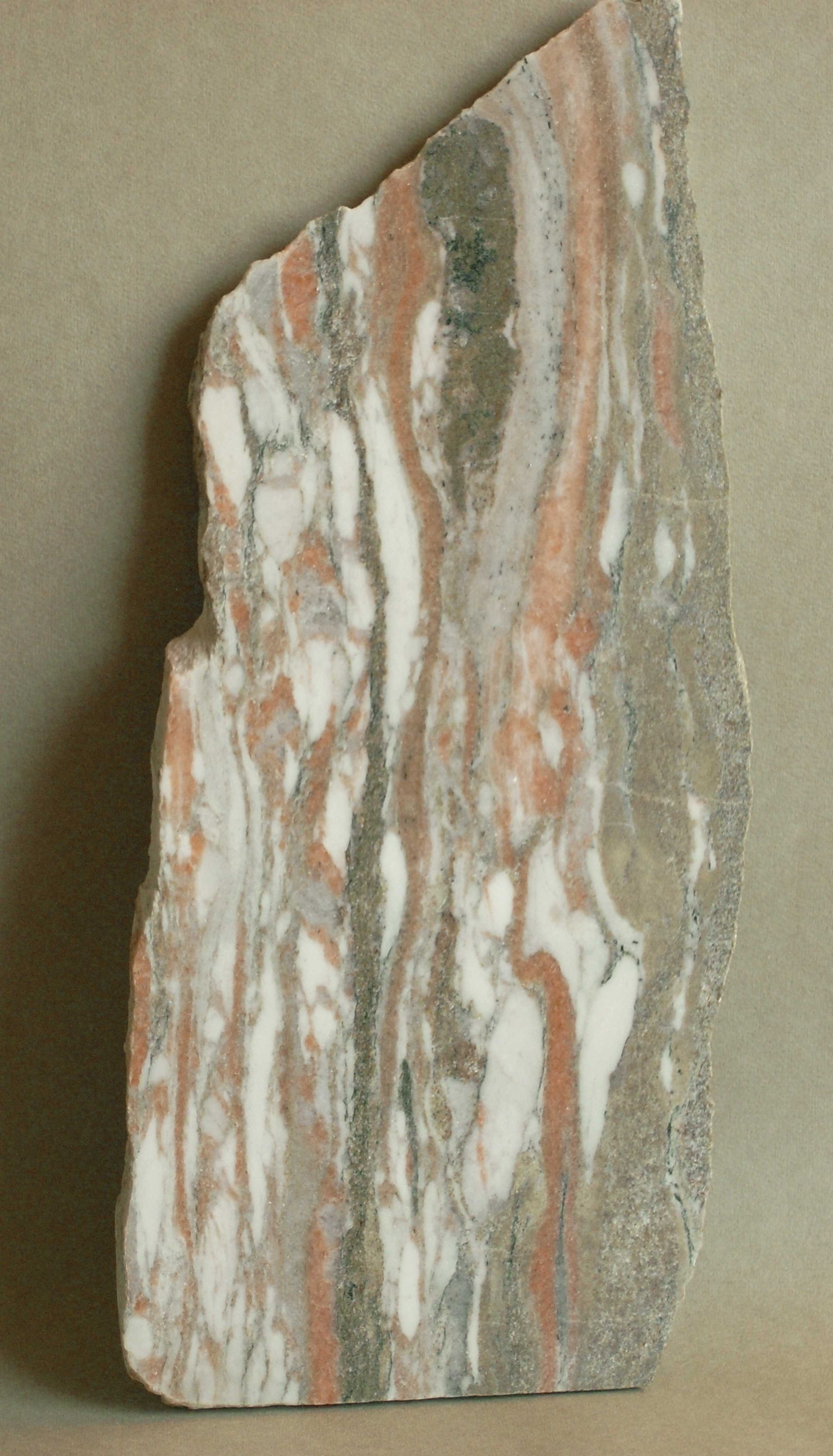
Marble from Fauske Municipality in Norway

- Fauske marble

=== Poland ===
- Marianna marble or Krzyżnik, marble from the Śnieżnik Mountains near Stronie Śląskie

=== Portugal ===
- Rosa aurora marble

=== Romania ===
- Bucova marble
- Rușchița marble

=== Russia ===
- Ruskeala

=== Spain ===
- Crema Marfil (Note: micritic limestone)
- Macael marble
- Negro Marquina (Note: bituminous limestone)
- Veteado Rio
- Emperador (Note: limestone)
- Negro Fantasia
- Saltador

=== Sweden ===
- Swedish green marble
- Ekeberg marble

=== Turkey ===
- Prokonnesos marble
- Pavonazzo marble
- Greco scritto

=== United Kingdom ===
- Ashford Black Marble (Note: Carboniferous Limestone)
- Cotham Marble (Note: stromatolitic limestone)
- Dent Marble (Note: crinoidal limestone)
- Frosterley Marble (Note: crinoidal limestone)
- Purbeck Marble (Note: fossiliferous limestone)
- Sussex Marble (Note: fossiliferous freshwater limestone)
- Iona marble (Note: fossiliferous freshwater limestone)

== North America ==
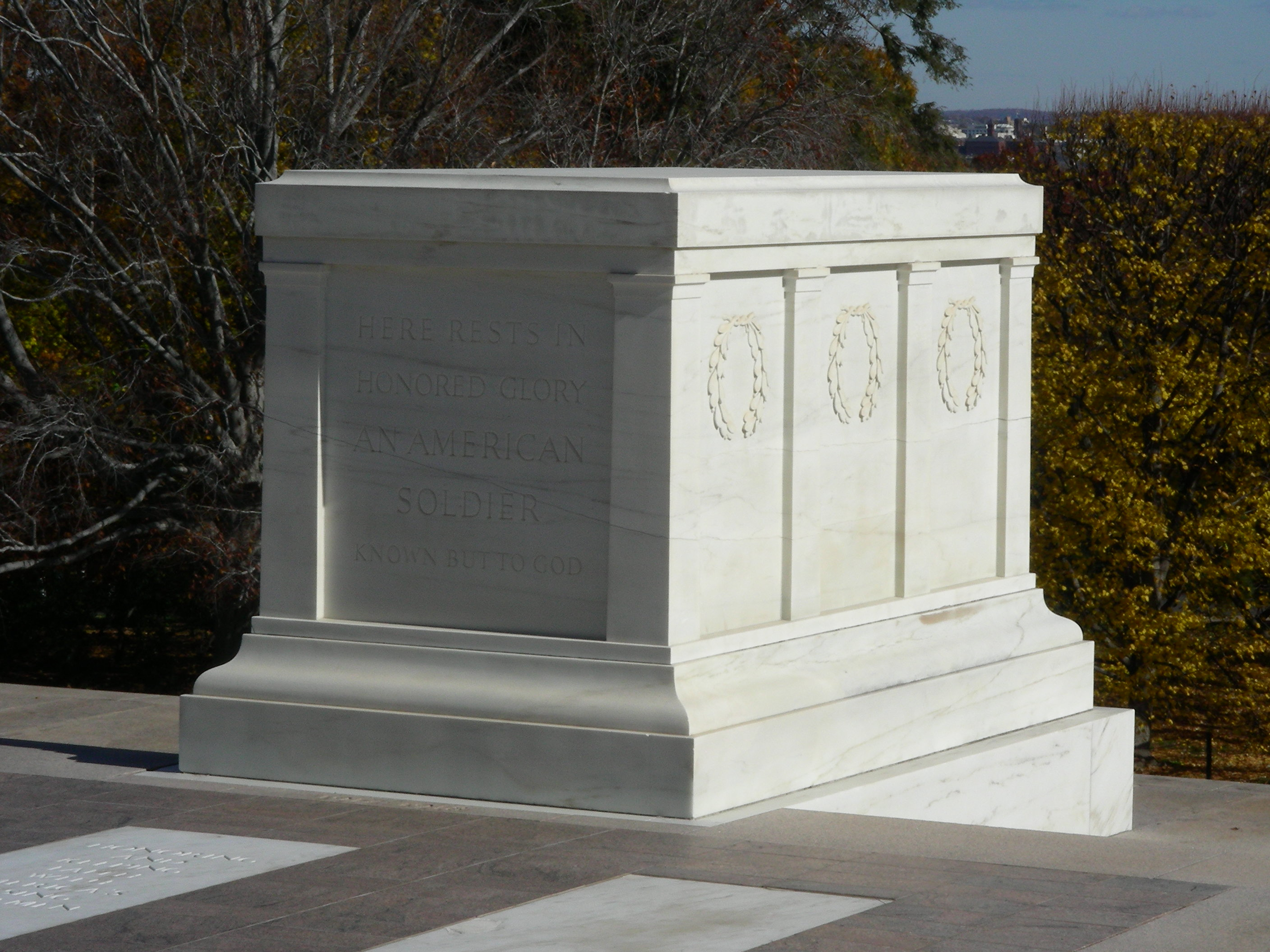
The Tomb of the Unknown Soldier at Arlington National Cemetery, Virginia, USA, is made of Yule marble.

=== United States ===
- Cockeysville marble
- Creole marble
- Etowah marble
- Murphy marble
- Potomac marble (Note: fanglomerate)
- St. Genevieve marble (Note: oolitic limestone)
- Sylacauga marble
- Tennessee marble (Note: limestone)
- Tuckahoe marble
- Vermont marble
- Yule marble

== Oceania ==
=== New Zealand ===
- Takaka marble

== South America ==
=== Chile ===
- Atacama Black Marble

== See also ==
- List of types of limestone
- List of sandstones
