= Golzinne =

Hamlet in Belgium

Coordinates: 50°31′9.08″N 4°42′55.91″E

Golzinne (French pronunciation: [ɡɔlzin]) is a hamlet of the village of Bossière in Wallonia. It is administratively part of the city of Gembloux, located in the province of Namur, Belgium.

It is notable as the only current producer of "Noir de Golzinne", a black marble. Marble from Golzinne was used in decorations of the Palace of Versailles.

== See also ==
- Noir Belge
