= Black marble (disambiguation) =

Black Marble is an American music project led by Chris Stewart.

Black marble may also refer to:

- Ashford Black Marble, a name given to dark limestone quarried from mines near Ashford-in-the-Water, England
- Black Marble (company), a Microsoft software development company in Britain
- The Black Marble, a 1980 film directed by Harold Becker
- The Blue Marble#Black Marble 2012, an image of Earth
- black-colored marble, a rare coloration of the stone
