= Swedish green =

Swedish green may refer to:

- Scheele's Green, pigment
- Swedish green marble
