= List of protected heritage sites in Sivry-Rance =

This table shows an overview of the protected heritage sites in the Walloon town Sivry-Rance. This list is part of Belgium's national heritage.

Object	Year/architect	Town/section	Address	Coordinates	Number^{?}	Image
Chapel "La Haut" in Sivry, situated on public municipal land along route n ° 8 ^{(nl)} ^{(fr)}		Sivry-Rance		50.170386°N 4.181088°E	56088-CLT-0001-01 Info	
Chapel of Saint-Roch, in Rance ^{(nl)} ^{(fr)}		Sivry-Rance		50.142958°N 4.270534°E	56088-CLT-0003-01 Info	
Facades and roofs of the 17th century building on Grand Rue n ° 75 in Sivry-Rance ^{(nl)} ^{(fr)}		Sivry-Rance		50.142633°N 4.273985°E	56088-CLT-0004-01 Info	
Totality of the bakery on rue d'Eppe No. 8 in Sivry-Rance ^{(nl)} ^{(fr)}		Sivry-Rance		50.125207°N 4.209866°E	56088-CLT-0005-01 Info	

== See also ==
- List of protected heritage sites in Hainaut (province)
- Sivry-Rance
