= Noir de Mazy =

Noir de Mazy is the only Belgian black (Devonian/Frasnian) limestone (see:Noir Belge) that is still exploited today. It is named after the quarry in the Belgian town of Mazy near Gembloux in Wallonia. It is also marketed under the name 'Noir de Golzinne' which is also the trade name of the geological vein that is currently exploited in Mazy.
