= Samuel Watson (sculptor) =

English sculptor in wood and stone

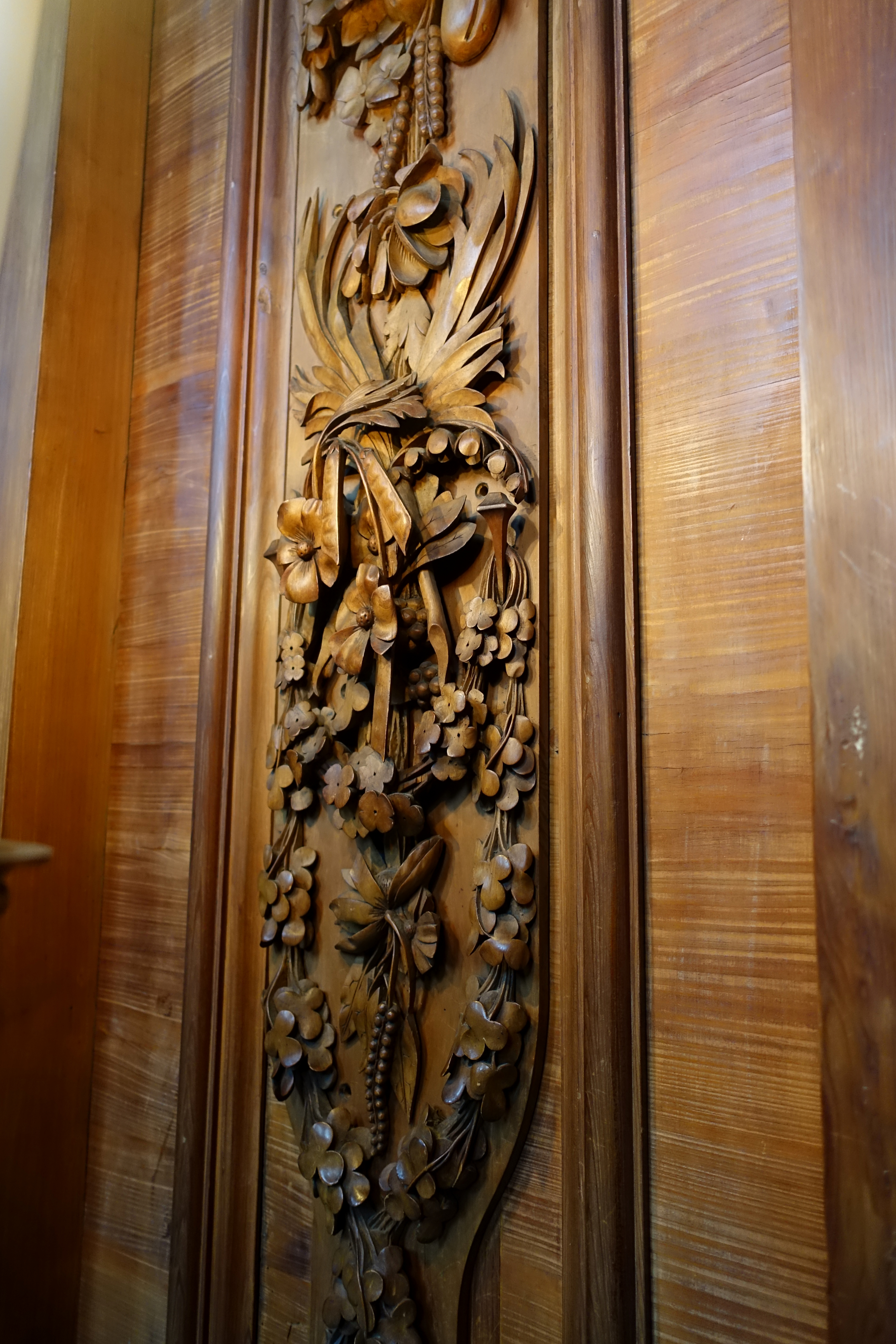
Wood carving by Samuel Watson in the Chatsworth House chapel

Samuel Watson (1662–1715), an English sculptor in wood and stone, was a native of Heanor, Derbyshire. He was employed at Chatsworth House between 1690 or 1691 and 1711.

== Family and work ==
Watson was born in Heanor, the son of a husbandman of Heanor, and his wife, Bridget, née Townsend. He was baptised there on 2 December 1662. Little is known of his early life. His grandson, White Watson, stated in a memoir that Samuel Watson "was a pupil of Mr. Charles Oakey, carver, in the parish of St Martin's in the Fields."

Oakey was employed by the 1st Duke of Beaufort on the remodelling of Badminton House in 1683. Watson is known to have worked at Burghley House and at Sudbury Hall. Also working at Badminton, Burghley and Sudbury was Grinling Gibbons, who had a great influence on Watson's work. Working at Chatsworth in 1690–1691, he rose to be chief carver and remained there until 1711. His contemporary, George Vertue, commented favourably on "The Ornaments Carv'd in wood & foliages by Watson sculptor in wood & stone. The boys in the Chapel and other parts of his works. Very fine... a most ingenious artist." Other work there has also been attributed to him.

Late in life, Watson married Katherine Greensmith (c. 1679–1739) from Pilsley, a Chatsworth estate village. He retired and they settled at Heanor. Their first son died in 1711, but a second son was born in 1714 and Katherine was pregnant with another when her husband died of a stroke and was buried at Heanor on 31 March 1715. His sons, Henry and Samuel II, both trained as carvers and so did his grandson, White Watson, who designed a monument for his grandfather in Heanor Church.
