= Ashford Black Marble =

Very fine-grained sedimentary rock

Coordinates: 53.22°N 1.71°W

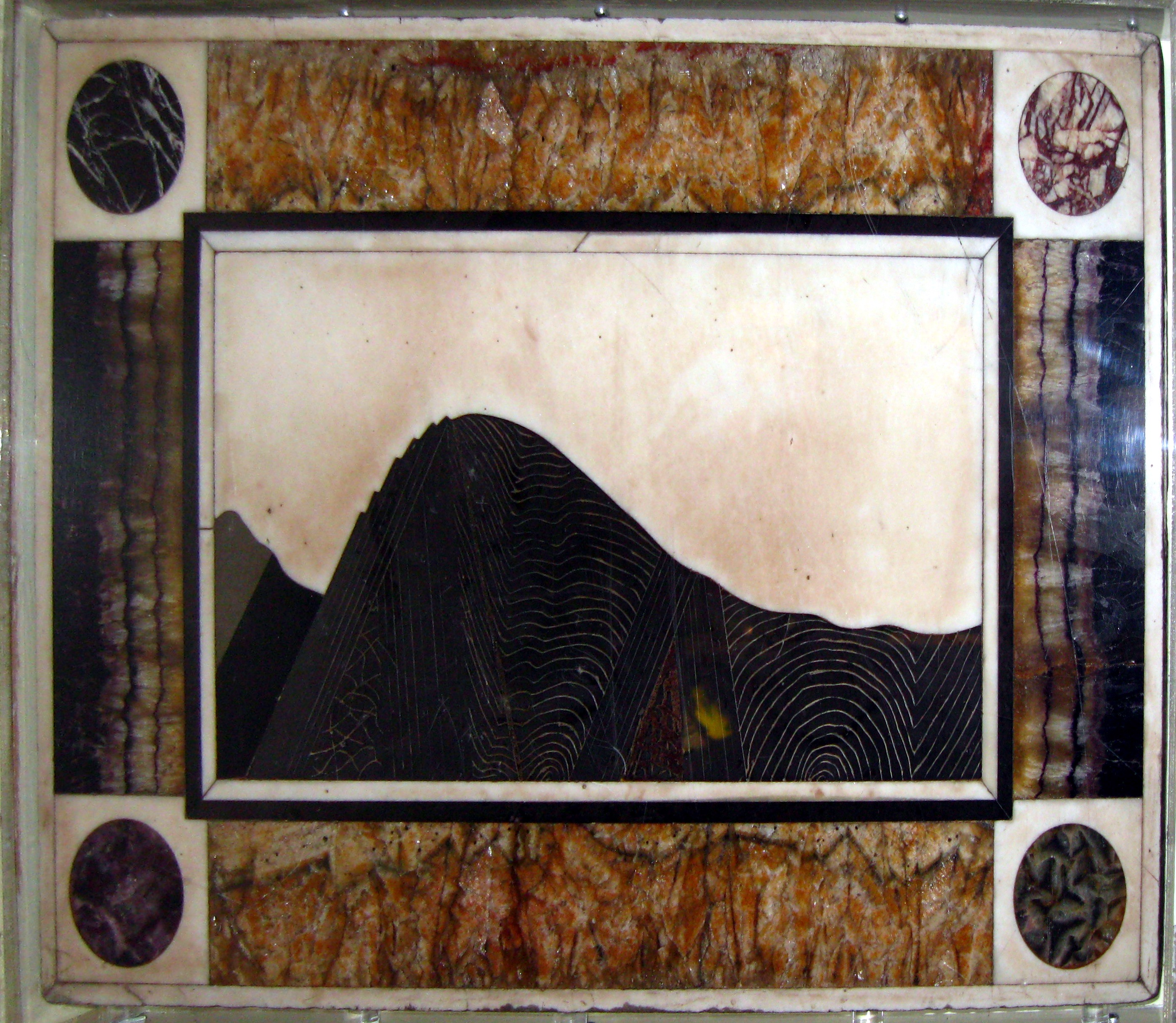
A picture of Ecton Hill made using Ashford Black Marble

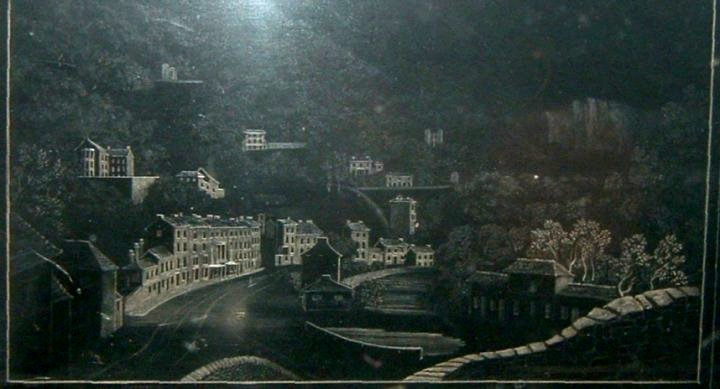
A picture of Matlock Bath engraved using Ashford Black Marble by Ann Rayner

Ashford Black Marble is the name given to a dark limestone, quarried from mines near Ashford-in-the-Water, in Derbyshire, England. Once cut, turned and polished, its shiny black surface is highly decorative. Ashford Black Marble is a very fine-grained sedimentary rock, and is not a true marble in the geological sense. It can be cut and inlaid with other decorative stones and minerals, using a technique known as pietra dura.

== History ==
The mineral has been used decoratively since prehistoric times; the first recorded customer was Bess of Hardwick in 1580.

Henry Watson, the uncle of Derbyshire geologist White Watson, is regarded as one of the key figures in the development of the local industry of inlaying Ashford Black Marble in the 1750s. He owned a water-powered mill at Ashford in the Water.

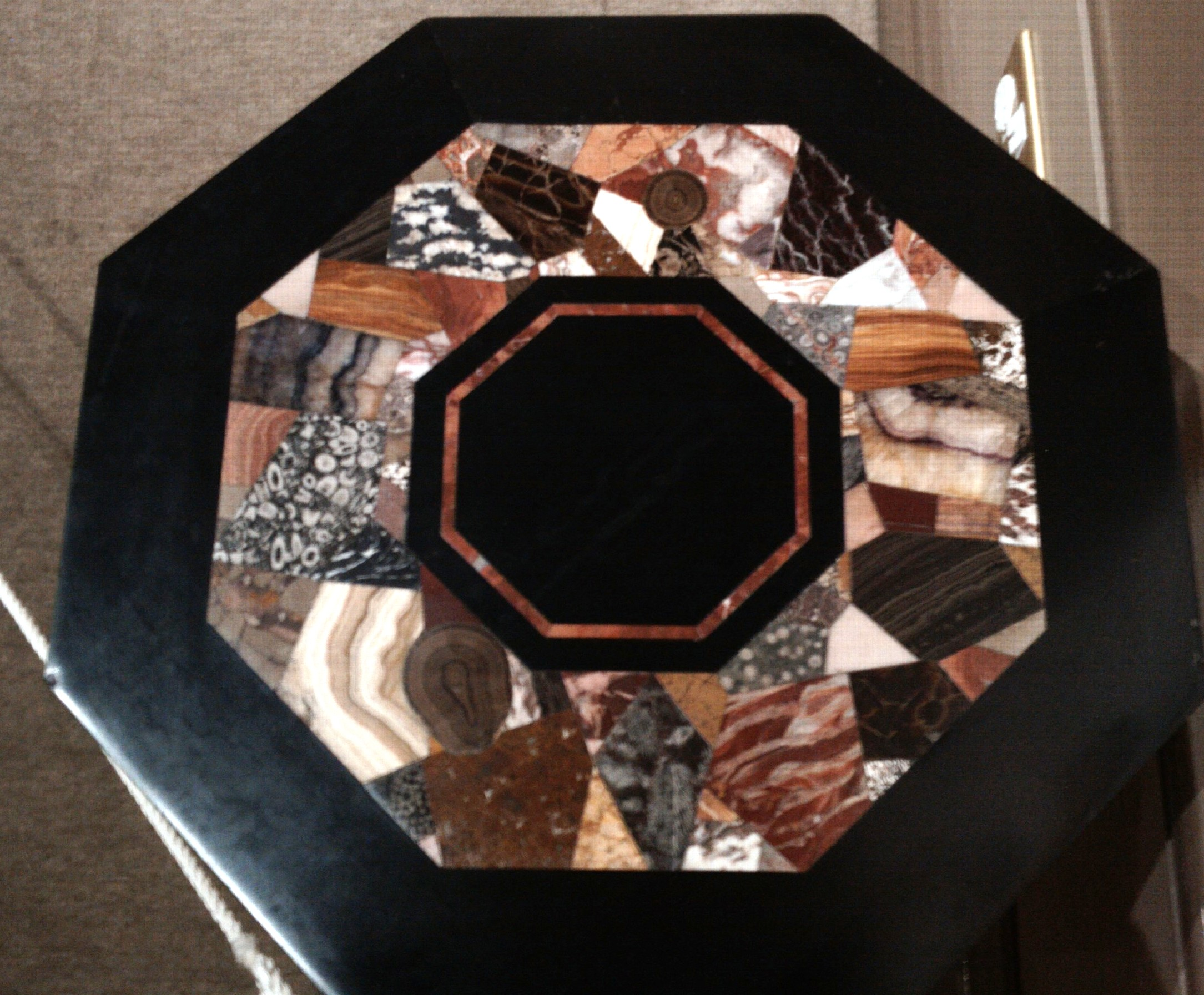
An inlaid table in Derby Museum

There was a thriving trade in the manufacture of urns, obelisks and other decorative items from Ashford Black Marble during the late 18th and early 19th century. John Mawe had a museum in Matlock Bath that dealt in black marble and Ann Rayner engraved pictures, next door at another museum, on black marble using a diamond. Many fine examples of engraved and inlaid black marble exist in local collections, including those of Derby Museum, Buxton Museum, and Chatsworth House. In 2009 huge blocks of unworked Ashford Black Marble were unearthed during excavation work near to the Seven Stars public house in Derby. The plan was to auction them due to the rarity of unworked Ashford Black marble. It was speculated that the rocks had been abandoned when an Ashford Black Marble manufacturer moved in the 1880s.

== Geology ==
Although referred to as marble, the rock is of purely sedimentary origin. It is a dark, fine-grained, muddy Carboniferous limestone, rich in bitumen which gives it its dark grey colouration which turns a glossy black when polished and surface treated. The prime source of this rock was from Arrock Mine, and later in 1832 from nearby Rookery Plantation, near Ashford-in-the-Water.

== Manufacturing techniques ==
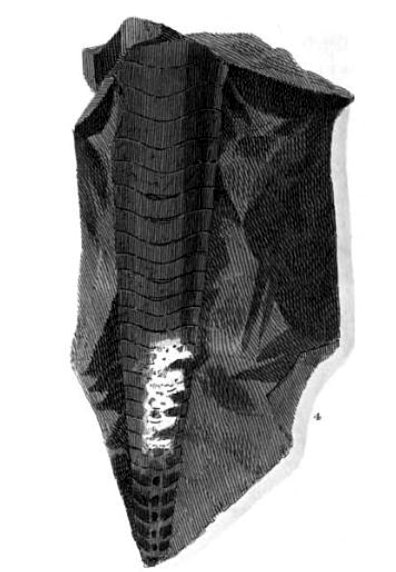
Fossil found in Black Marble by William Martin of a type that was once thought to be a crocodile tail

The limestone can be turned on a lathe to create urns, candlesticks and other similar objects, or sawn to produce smooth, flat items such as obelisks and paperweights. Derby Museum and Art Gallery holds collections of worked and part-worked items of Ashford Black Marble, acquired from an inlaying workshop owned by the Tomlinson family. This includes a range of pre-cut pieces ready for inlaying into the black marble background. Items such as forget-me-not and lily of the valley flowers would typically be represented. Coloured rocks to inlay into the black "marble" included grey, blue and purple minerals locally from Monyash, "rosewood" from Nettler Dale in Sheldon which consisted of red and white layers, barytes which created other variations, the local Castleton Blue John which could create purple, and yellow fluorspar from Crich, whilst "Birds-Eye" rock had a design made from the fossils that it contained. The rarest mineral was known as "Duke's Red" and this was so valuable that it was stored at Chatsworth House. The tabletop design illustrated shows some of the combinations described here.

In the late 1780s Derbyshire geologist White Watson began to create explanatory geological tablets using Ashford Black Marble into which other local rocks were inlaid so as to represent the strata of the rocks in different parts of the county. Derby Museum has a diagram of Ecton Hill (see picture) made from Ashford Black Marble and other minerals.

William Martin, who at one time worked with Watson, wrote the first scientific study of fossils. His Petrifacta Derbiensia recounts that White Watson's uncle and workers at the Black Marble quarry called some of the fossils "crocodile tails" as they thought they were the remains of crocodiles.

The craft of inlaying black marble was resumed in the 1990s by Don Edwards, who ran a rock and mineral dealership in the Derbyshire village of Tideswell. In 2006 it was announced that Buxton Museum had purchased the Black Marble collection that had been left by John Michael Tomlinson. He had spent over 50 years putting together the collection after finding that his ancestors had been involved in Ashford Black Marble manufacturing. Derby Museum has a diagram of Ecton Hill made from Ashford Black Marble and other minerals.

== See also ==
- List of types of limestone
- List of types of marble
- Noir Belge

== Sources ==
- Derbyshire Black Marble, John Michael Tomlinson, 1996, ISBN 0-904334-04-X
- The Gem of the Peak, William Adam, 1843
