= White Watson =

Derbyshire geologist

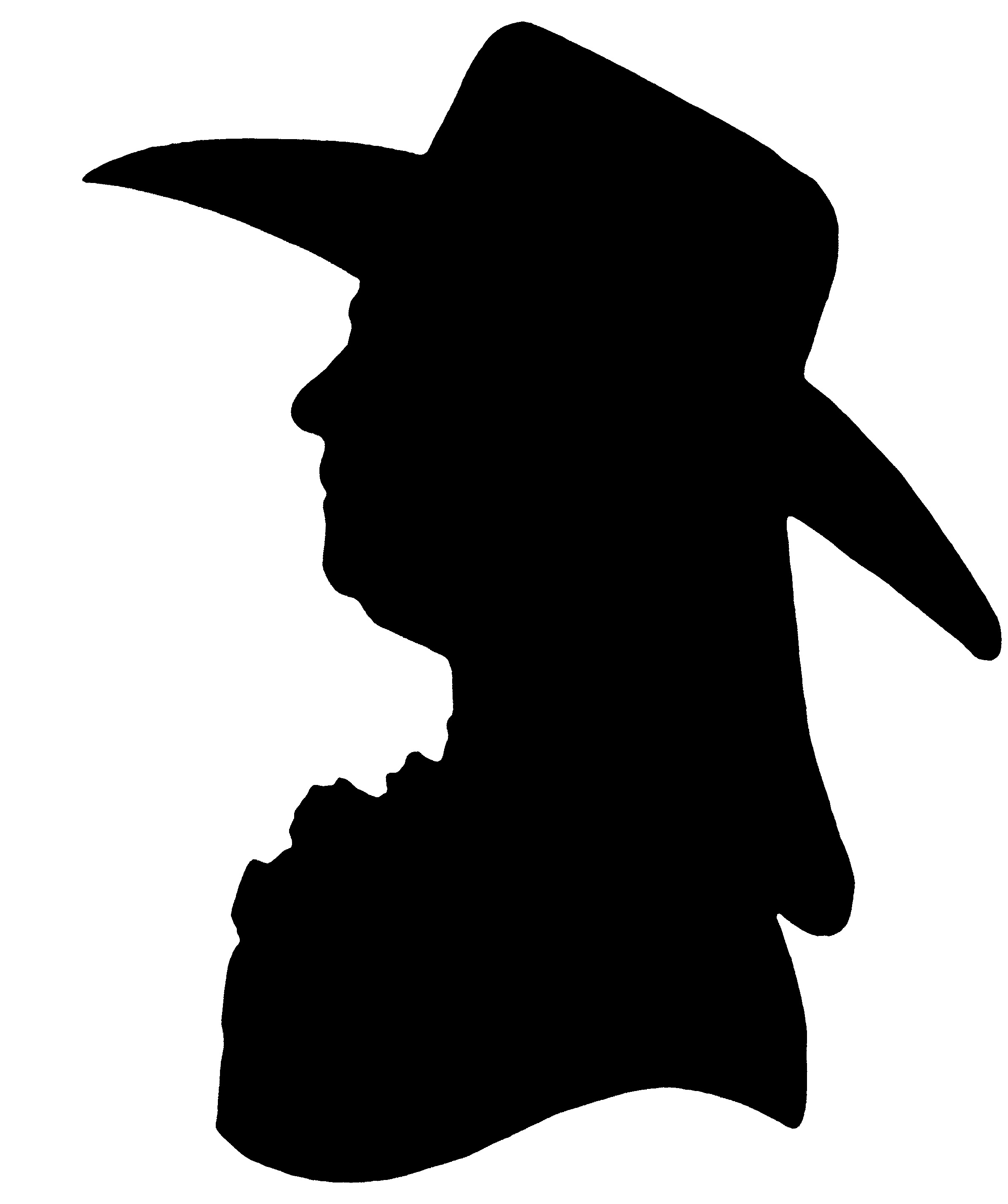
- self-silhouette
- Born: 10 April 1760; Sheffield
- Died: 8 August 1835 (aged 75); Bakewell
- Parent(s): Samuel and Martha White

White Watson (10 April 1760 – 8 August 1835) was an early English geologist, sculptor, stonemason and carver, marble-worker and mineral dealer. In common with many learned people of his time, he was skilled in a number of artistic and scientific areas, becoming a writer, poet, journalist, teacher, botanist and gardener as well as a geologist and mineralogist. He kept extensive diaries and sketchbooks of his observations on geology, fossils and minerals, flora and fauna, and published a small but significant and influential number of geological papers and catalogues. As an artist he was well known locally for his silhouettes, both on paper and as marble inlays.

== Life 1760–1800 ==
Watson was born at Whitely Wood Hall, Whiteley Woods, near Sheffield, on 10 April 1760. His father was Samuel Watson, a millstone manufacturer of Baslow, Derbyshire, and his mother Martha White (which is from where his unusual first name derives). Watson's great-grandfather, Samuel Watson, and his grandfather, also Samuel Watson, had been sculptors and stonemasons engaged in the re-building of Chatsworth House between 1687 and 1706. Continuing the family tradition, in later years White Watson would also work for the Chatsworth Estate.

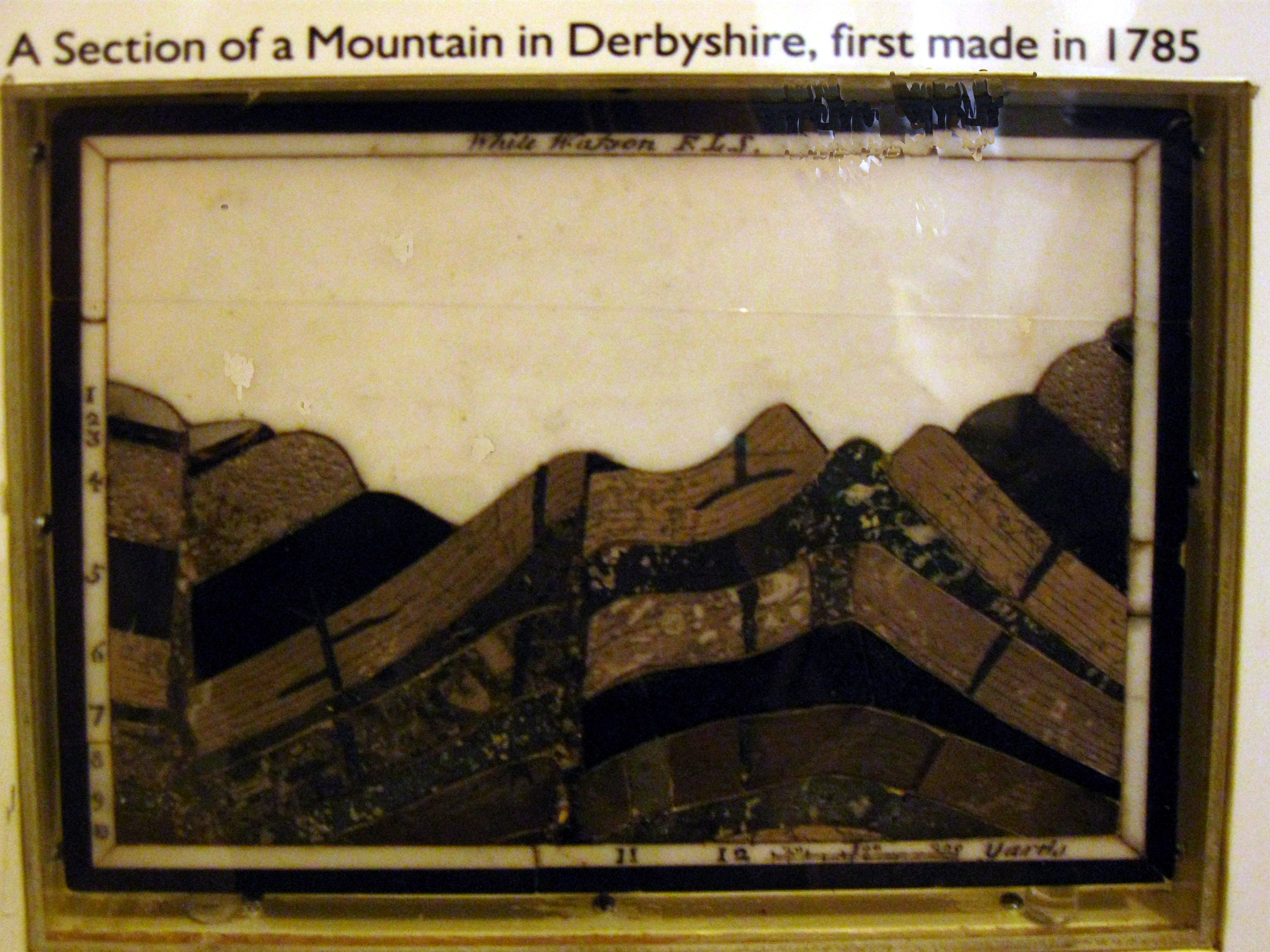
A cross section of Derbyshire geology made from sections of rock by White Watson. Now in Derby Museum.

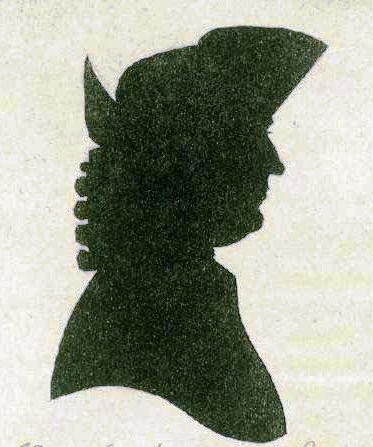
Henry Watson 1714?–1786 – image dated to c. 1800

Whilst still a child, Watson became interested in minerals and fossils, and began his own collection as well as providing specimens for sale in his uncle's shop. His uncle, Henry Watson, had been a marble sculptor in Bakewell and Ashford-in-the-Water since the early 1750s, and he built and owned the water-powered marble mill in Ashford-in-the-Water. Henry Watson was largely responsible for founding the trade in the local Blue John fluorite and Ashford Black Marble, and provided the magnificent black and white marble flooring for the Great Hall at Chatsworth House in 1779. On leaving Sheffield School at the age of 14, White Watson went to live with his uncle, and was apprenticed to him on 31 May 1774. According to his own catalogue, now preserved in Sheffield Library, he formally began his collection of fossils and marbles the same year. By 1782 he was advertising his trade as a sculptor and engraver, and helping his uncle to run the business.

Possibly inspired by geologist John Whitehurst's 1782 diagrams of stratigraphic sections in the Matlock area of Derbyshire, in 1785 Watson presented Whitehurst with a diagrammatic 'Tablet', 'A Section of a Mountain in Derbyshire', made from samples of the rocks themselves. This innovative method of display not only showed an early understanding of the new science of geological strata but also formed the first attempt at documenting the stratigraphical structure of Derbyshire as a whole as opposed to the structure of specific localities as Whitehurst had. Over the course of his life, Watson would produce about 100 such tablets, accompanied with explanatory leaflets, and his papers contain sketches for considerably more. Unfortunately most of these tablets are now untraceable, although around fifteen are known to still survive.

Henry Watson died in 1786, and the Ashford-in-the-Water business was then sold. From here on, White Watson became a finisher of marble—for many years a considerable part of his business continued to be gravestones and monumental church marbles—and a fossil and mineral specimen dealer from his own premises in Bakewell which he maintained as a shop and museum for his collection until his death. It was White Watson who was chiefly responsible for the popular commercialisation of works produced in Ashford Black Marble, a limestone impregnated with bitumen to give it its sleek blackness.

In the early 1790s Watson collaborated with William Martin (1767–1810) on an illustrated catalogue of Derbyshire's Carboniferous Limestone fossils. Watson had been unsuccessfully attempting to raise funding for such a publication since 1790, and produced a one-page ' Prospectus of a Catalogue and Description of Derbyshire Fossils ' outlining the proposal (now in Sheffield Central Library) that year (a second prospectus on the theme, in conjunction with Martin, dates from 1792). However, after they began working together on the project and managed to raise the necessary funds to publish, Martin began to produce installments on his own from 1793, using Watson's text contributions and his accompanying plates with virtually no credit given. As a result, the pair eventually fell out, and Martin re-published the series under his own name as Volume I of Petrificata Derbiensia in 1809 without giving any credit to Watson at all.

Watson was elected a Fellow of the Linnean Society in 1795, and remained a member until his death. He was also a member of the Derby Philosophical Society from 1800, nominated by Georgiana, the Duchess of Devonshire, and a member of the British Mineralogical Society.

In 1798 he remodelled a grotto in the Chatsworth House grounds into a crystal cave studded with fossils, at a cost of £110 19s. (the current grotto is a later construction from the 1830s and not Watson's work). Following this, he continued to work for the Chatsworth Estate. Originally contracted for five weeks between April and June 1799 to catalogue and arrange the important mineral collection begun by Georgiana, Duchess of Devonshire, then partly housed in Chiswick, he also arranged the mineral collection of Lady Henrietta of Bessborough (Georgiana's sister) in Cavendish Square at the same time.

== Life 1800–1835 ==
Watson was then commissioned in 1804 to work on the rest of Georgiana's collection, the Chatsworth Mineral Collection, adding a considerable number of items during this time and further refining his understanding of the different types of rock and minerals and their relationships. By this time, Watson was something of a celebrity in natural history circles, and often received visitors to his collection at The Bath House in Bakewell, where he also lived and acted as superintendent for the Baths. One of these visitors, J. Hunter wrote of Watson in his Collectiana Hunteriana (1804): "Mr Watson was rather below the middle stature with a pug face, is a bachelor and takes his glass of spirits and water at the Inn in Bakewell every evening." Other notable visitors, correspondents and purchasers of specimens or collections over the years included Lord Denman, Sir Joseph Banks, William Buckland, Erasmus Darwin and James Sowerby, as well as the notable French mineralogist Alexandre Brongniart.

In 1808 Watson married Ann Thorpe, aged 29, from Buckminster, Leicestershire, who was a relative of Sir Isaac Newton. Earlier the same year he produced a tablet showing a detailed cross-section of the stratigraphy of Derbyshire on a line from Buxton to Bolsover, which he presented to the Duke of Devonshire on 20 February 1808. From 1810 Watson made a number of tablets of this section, largely on a scale of 1/2 inch to a mile or one inch to a mile, and based on these published an important early work on the geology of Derbyshire, The Delineation of the Strata of Derbyshire, in 1811. Despite being designed during an early and somewhat primitive stage of the science of geology, it is remarkable how accurate these sections were, describing a sequence of 36 stratigraphical levels in Derbyshire rocks with a lengthy fold-out cross-section of almost the entire width of Derbyshire. By then, Watson's tablets, sketches and notes clearly show that Watson was aware of and in agreement with Abraham Werner's theories of geology and classification of rocks, and The Delineation includes some discussion on Werner's theories. Watson's personal papers from 1800 included A catalogue of a systematic collection of fossils arranged according to Mr Werner's system.

A number of other sections along different lines across Derbyshire were published between 1813 and 1831, together with numerous localised geological sections of peaks and cliffs such as Mam Tor. An 1813 pamphlet 'Section of Strata in the Vicinity of Matlock Bath', argued against John Farey (1766–1826), a contemporary surveyor and geologist who had produced a geological map, A General View of the Agriculture and Minerals of Derbyshire, early in 1811 (prior to Watson's Delineation). Working independently and with little other information other than what they themselves had observed, Watson and Farey disagreed considerably over the details of the geological structure of Derbyshire, and Watson correctly realised that the Derbyshire mountain landscapes were caused by underground volcanic action as opposed to Farey's assertion that they were formed by "satellite attraction from above". However, any friction over personal theories or accusations by Farey of appropriation of ideas did not preclude their discussing their findings during a number of meetings in Bakewell around 1811.

In 1825, the year of Ann's death, Watson's business card stated he "executes monuments, tombs etc., gives lessons in geology and mineralogy and furnishes collections, affords information to antiquaries and amusement to Botanists". Probably in the same year, Watson produced an unusual circular stratigraphical diagram A DELINEATION of the ten deepest STRATA as yet discovered in the MINERAL DISTRICTS of DERBYSHIRE. In this the geological strata are arranged in near-concentric circles outwards from the oldest rocks towards the centre to youngest rocks at points around the edge marked with the different place names in Derbyshire where the strata had been noted. These points lay at different distances from the centre according to the complexity of the stratification at that point.

Later in his life, Watson designed improvements for Bakewell Baths, his residence, for the Duke of Rutland, who wanted to establish Bakewell as a fashionable spa town. Although this project ultimately failed, Watson was responsible for the Bath Gardens which were laid out in the town as part of the scheme, and these layouts largely survive today.

Despite all his works, Watson was always in debt, and he died still struggling to pay his bills by selling much of his fossil collection. As Ford notes of his still-surviving cash ledger from 1796–1833, "if the entries really are a complete record of his income and expenditure he was often close to bankruptcy!"

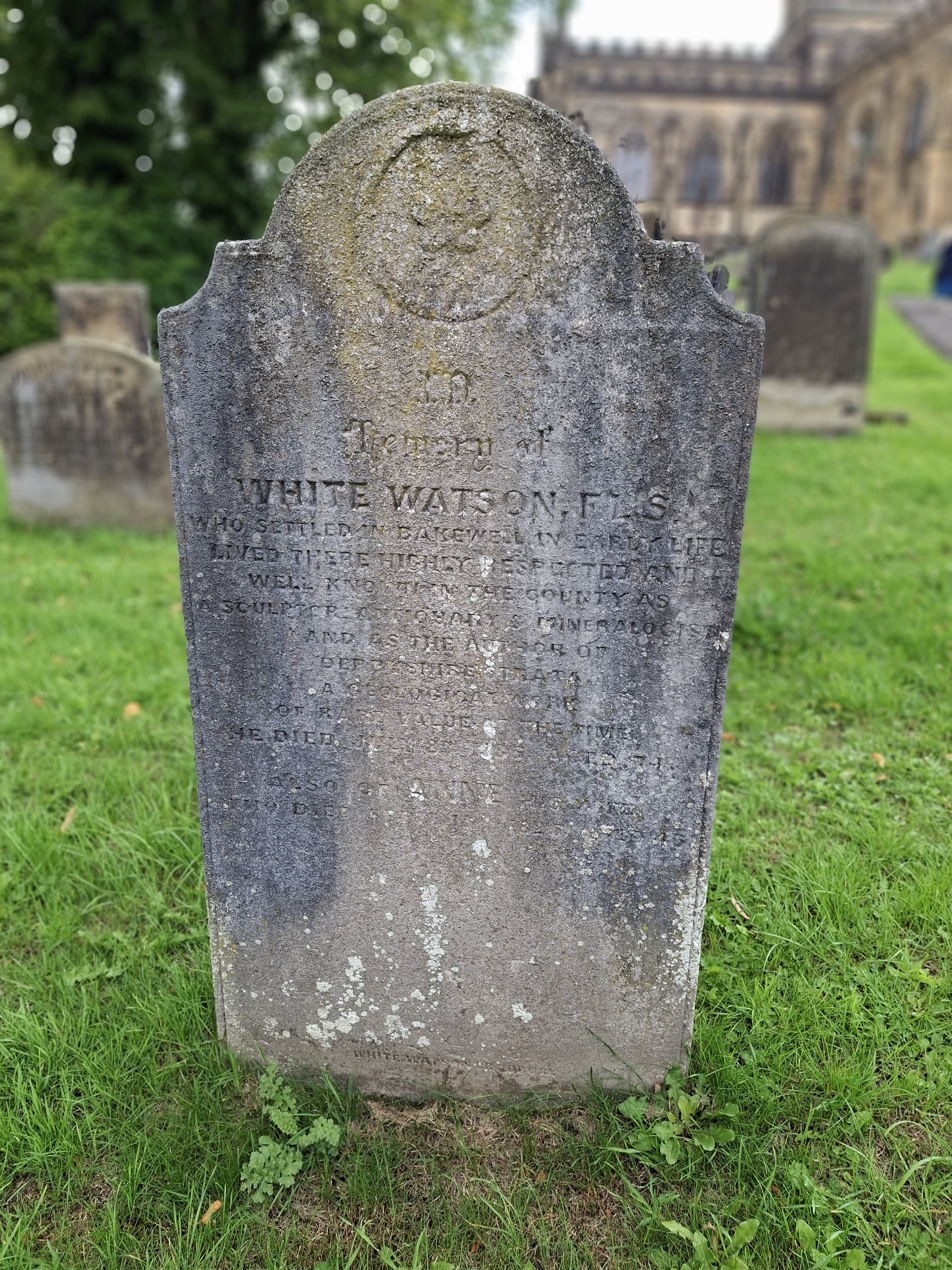
White Watson gravestone in the churchyard of All Saints' Church, Bakewell, UK

White Watson died in Bakewell on 8 August 1835, and is buried in Bakewell churchyard. He had no children.

== Surviving works ==
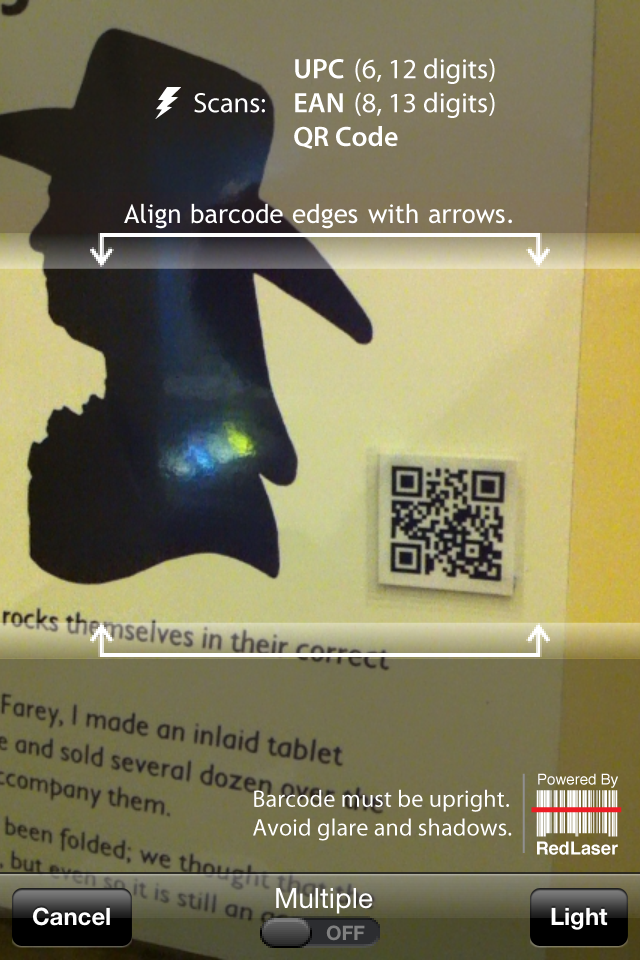
White Watson features at Derby Museum with a QR Code to allow visitors to read the Wikipedia article about him.

His collections were broken up and sold on his death. However, examples of his marble and limestone work survive in the tomb of the Foljambe family at Bakewell Church, a plaque at St George's Chapel, Windsor for George III from 1789 and the known remaining geological tablets. His tablets of 'A Section of a Mountain in Derbyshire' and 'A Section of the curious curvilinear Strata at Ecton Hill' are now in Derby Museum, as are a number of others. Other surviving tablets, including contemporaneous copies of the ones in Derby Museum, are in the British Museum (Natural History), London, Oxford University Museum, Bakewell Old House Museum, Chatsworth House, Manchester Museum and Leicester Museum. Watson's manuscript catalogue of the Chatsworth Mineral Collection is still kept at Chatsworth House, together with many of the specimens he provided for the collection. Despite years of neglect, the collection itself, including many of Watson's own specimens, has been largely restored at Chatsworth House after over 10 years of painstaking restoration by the Russell Society. A Catalogue of the External Characters of Fossils, by White Watson F.L.S. Bakewell, Derbyshire. 1798, found during this restoration work, is also held by Chatsworth House. His diaries from 1780–1831 are in the Bagshawe Collection in Sheffield City Library, together with his fossil catalogues. Other private papers, notes and sketches, together with much material for but extra to published volumes, are held in Sheffield Library and Derby Library, and an album of preparatory silhouettes from 1806 is also in Derby Library.

== Publications ==
An incomplete list of published work other than the accompanying explanations for sections and maps:

- Observations on Bakewell, post-1798
- A Catalogue of a Collection of Limestones, 1803
- A Catalogue of a Collection of Limestones, 1805
- A Catalogue of a Collection of Limestones, 1805
- A Catalogue of a Collection of Fossils, 1805
- A Delineation of the Strata of Derbyshire, 1811. Republished, 1973. ISBN 0-903485-06-0
- A Collection of Poems, 1812 (intended to accompany the 'Delineation' above)
- A Section of the Strata forming the Surface in the Vicinity of Matlock Bath in Derbyshire, 1813
- On Entrochal Marble, one-page pamphlet, 1826
- A Theory on the Formation of Mineral Veins, one-page pamphlet, 1827
- A Description of Slickensides, one-page pamphlet, 1829
- Observations on Prismatic Gritstone, one-page pamphlet, 1833
