= Griotte =

Name for types of marble and limestone

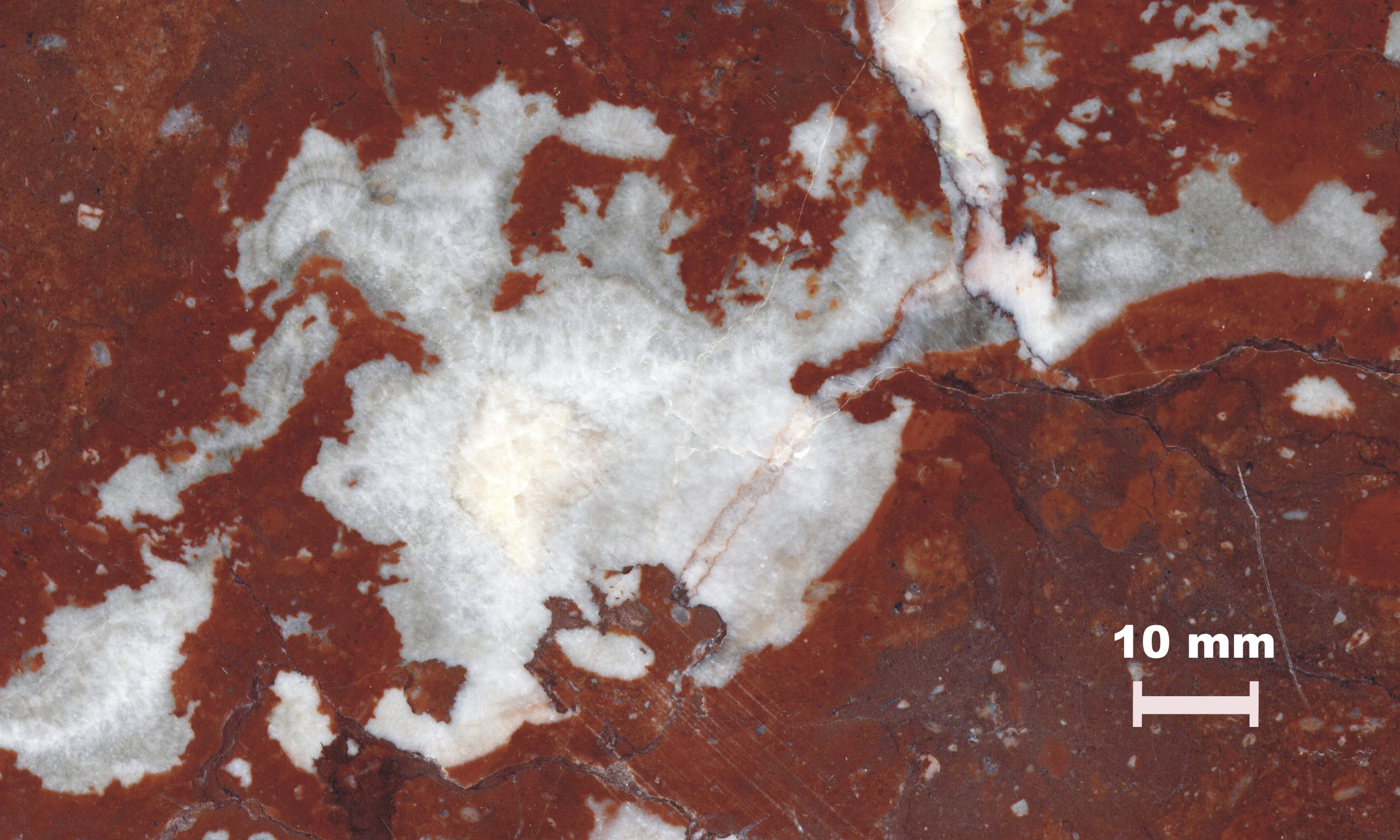
Belgian limestone Griotte belge (Wallonia)

Griotte is a cultural and old trade name given to a type of marbles and limestones. The natural stone is deep cherry-red to brown in colour, often flecked with small dashes of purple and/or spots and streaks of white formed by Goniatites or by later cementation. It is sometimes known as Cannes marble.

The name "griotte" is derived from a French word meaning "Morello cherry"; the marble is so named because of its dark red color and because the crystals are said to resemble masses of flattened cherries.

Griotte marble is common in the south of France, in the Pyrenees and southern Belgium. Subvarieties include griotte d'italie fleuri, griotte de Caunes, griotte de Sost, griotte St. Remy, and griotte oeil de perdrix (partridge-eye), which has uniformly small white spots.

Griotte is widely used as a decorative stone in architecture. Some parts of the Arc de Triomphe du Carrousel are made of griotte. The Opus Alexandrinum pavement of Bristol Cathedral and Opus Sectile floors of Peterborough Cathedral are made of griotte d'italie.

== See also ==
- List of types of marble
- Geology of the Pyrenees
