= William Martin (naturalist) =

English naturalist and palaeontologist

- Born: 1767; Mansfield, England
- Died: 31 May 1810 (aged 42–43); Macclesfield, England
- Occupation: Teacher
- Known for: Palaeontologist who published the first scientific study of fossils in English

William Martin (1767 – 31 May 1810) was an English naturalist and palaeontologist who proposed that science should use fossils as evidence to support the study of natural history. Martin published the first colour pictures of fossils and the first scientific study of fossils in English.

== Biography ==
Martin was born in Mansfield in 1767. His father worked in the hosiery business, but he left to become an actor in Ireland with the stage name of Joseph Booth. His father was also an inventor and portrait painter who died in London in 1797. Martin's abandoned mother, who was born Mallatratt, was also an actress.

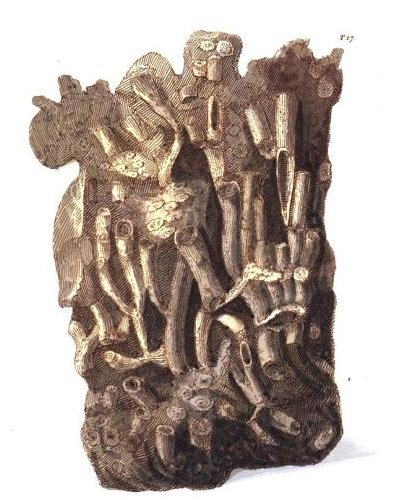
Erismolithus – one of the colour plates from his 1809 publication Petrificata derbiensia

Whilst still a child he appeared on the stage, both as a five-year-old dancer, and later giving recitations. It was arranged for Martin to learn draughtsmanship from James Bolton in Halifax. From 1782 to 1785 he was with a Derbyshire acting troupe when he met White Watson with whom he was to collaborate in a work on Derbyshire fossils. His work with fossils and natural history eventually led to Martin being elected a fellow of the Linnaean Society. Like Watson, Martin was influenced by the work of Derbyshire geologist, John Whitehurst. Whitehurst had published An Inquiry into the Original State and Formation of the Earth in 1778 which contained an important appendix which concerned General Observations on the Strata in Derbyshire. However, it was Abraham Mills FRS who switched Martin from zoology to palaeontology at some time before 1789. Martin published Figures and Descriptions of Petrifications collected in Derbyshire in 1793.

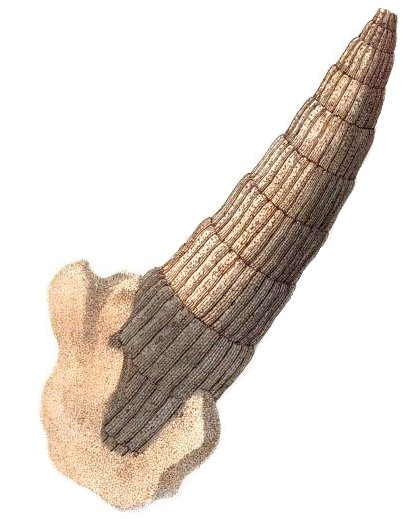
Another of Martin's illustrations – Horn coral. These were the first coloured illustrations of British fossils.

Martin worked with White Watson to create joint publications, but the partnership did not work well with Watson claiming that he was not receiving sufficient credit. Martin later published some of Watson's work on fossils using only his own name and without giving credit to Watson. Martin had six children with his "unfortunate, but interesting" wife who, like his parents, had been on the stage before her second marriage to Martin in 1797. In 1798 their son William Charles Linnaeus Martin was born. He was given the name Linnaeus in honour of Martin's interest in the classification of living things. His son was to write numerous books on natural history after becoming the scientific officer to the Zoological Society.

Martin was employed as a writing teacher, initially working at Burton-on-Trent in 1798, then in Buxton. Finally, in 1805, he moved to Macclesfield, where he taught at Macclesfield Grammar School. Martin's interest in nature did not diminish and he would send artefacts to James Sowerby who would illustrate them for him.

Martin did some provincial acting until 1809, and he owned a quarter share in Buxton Theatre. In 1809 he published Petrifacta Derbiensia, which he dedicated to Sir Joseph Banks. Petrifacta Derbiensia contained illustrations, the first in colour, which helped Martin describe the fossils and Carboniferous limestone he had studied in Derbyshire. Identification was still uncertain. The horn coral, illustrated here, was thought to possibly be from a type of undiscovered bamboo.

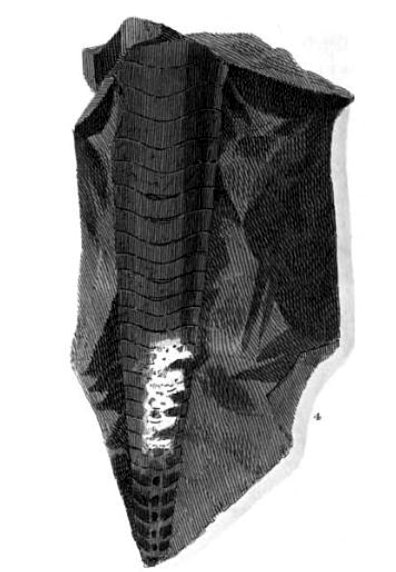
Martin's illustration of a fossil that others had described as a crocodile tail.

Petrifacta Derbiensia records another fossil which Martin considered a type of straightened Nautilus. He recounts that White Watson's uncle and workers at the Ashford Black Marble quarry called some of the fossils "crocodile tails" as they had been thought to be the remains of a small crocodile tail. Martin thought that none of the fossils in the book were the remains of crocodiles.

Martin also published Outlines of an Attempt to establish a Knowledge of Extraneous Fossils on Scientific Principles in 1809. Martin had published the first scientific study of fossils and palaeontology in English, and he met John Farey to discuss the possibility of a joint effort to create a geological map of Derbyshire. Martin's consumption, however, prevented further planning, and he died in Macclesfield at the end of May 1810. He was buried in Christ Church, Macclesfield and a collection was required to care for his children and his mother.

== Legacy ==
Martin's work with brachiopods was honoured in 1844 when the genus Martinia was named after him. Seven years later he was again remembered when the Derbyshire fossil coral Lithostrotion martini was named. Martin's work and biography is described in the minerals section of Derby Museum and Art Gallery.

== Sources ==
Woodward, Bernard Barham (1893). "Martin, William (1767-1810)" . In Lee, Sidney (ed.). Dictionary of National Biography. Vol. 36. London: Smith, Elder & Co.
