= St. Genevieve marble =

Marble found in Missouri

St. Genevieve marble, also known as Ste. Genevieve marble, is an oolitic limestone (or "marble") found in Sainte Genevieve County, Missouri. It is part of the Pitkin Formation of limestone.

It generally comes in two different types. "St. Genevieve Rose" is the name for the marble which comes in deep red, greenish-gray, pink, and rose. "St. Genevieve Gold Vein" is light or medium gray in color, with veins (running from buff to tan in color) running through it. Cross-sections of corals and crinoids can be seen in the Gold Vein type.

In the 1910s, it was widely considered the best "marble" found in the U.S. and known for its strength. It has been widely used in banks, churches, courthouses, government buildings, and other structures.

== Bibliography ==
- Goodrich, Charles Rush. Science and Mechanism: Illustrated by Examples in the New York Exhibition 1853-54. New York: G. P. Putnam and Co., 1854.
- Jaynes, Gregory. Sketches From a Dirt Road. Garden City, N.Y.: Doubleday, 1977.
- Missouri: The WPA Guide to the 'Show Me' State. St. Louis: Missouri Historical Society Press, 1998.
- Official Manual of the State of Missouri. St. Louis: Office of the Secretary of State, 1963.
- Swallow, G.C. First Report of Progress of the Geological Survey of Missouri. Jefferson City, Mo.: James Lusk, Printers, 1855.
- Sweet's Catalogue of Building Construction. New York: Sweet's Catalogue Service, 1915.
- Unklesbay, A.G., and Vineyard, Jerry D. Missouri Geology: Three Billion Years of Volcanoes, Seas, Sediments, and Erosion. Columbia, Mo.: University of Missouri Press, 1992.
- Washington, D.C.: A Guide to the Nation's Capital. Washington, D.C.: Federal Writers' Project, 1942.

== See also ==
- List of types of marble
