= RANS =

RANS or Rans may refer to:

== Places ==
- Rans, Jura, a commune in eastern France
- Rans, a parish in the municipality of Penafiel, northern Portugal

== Algorithms ==
- rANS, an entropy coding technique
- Reynolds-averaged Navier–Stokes equations

== Others ==
- RANS Cilegon F.C., an Indonesian football club
- Rans Designs, an aircraft, sail trike, land yacht and bicycle manufacturer, usually styled as "RANS" by the company
- Rans Rifol (born 2001), Filipino singer and actress
