= Swedish green marble =

Type of marble from Sweden

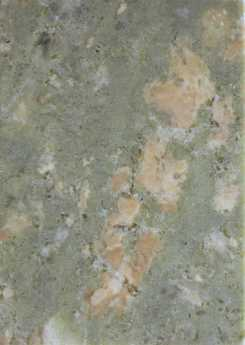
Swedish green marble

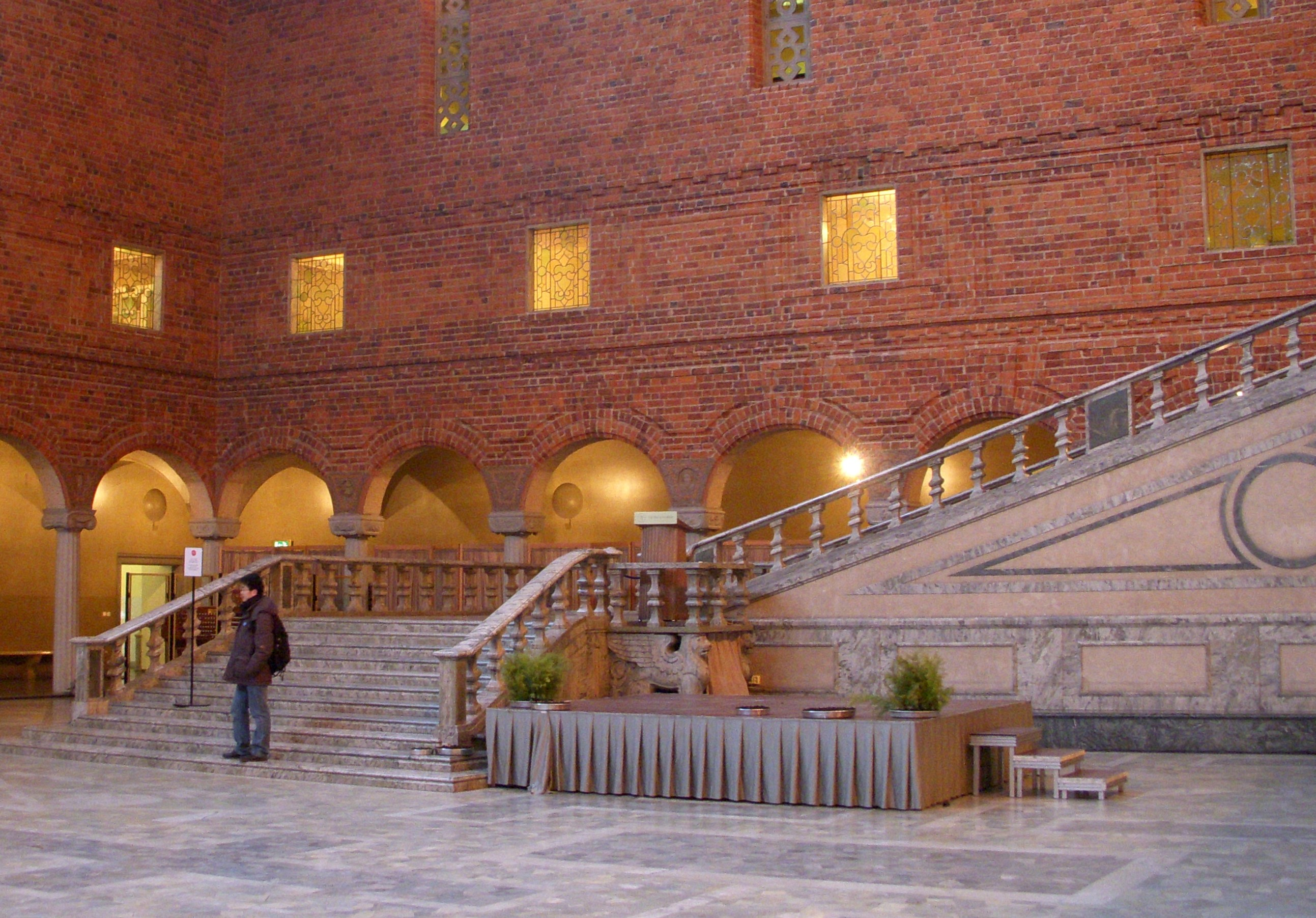
The grand staircase of Stockholm City Hall in Stockholm is made of Swedish green

Swedish green marble, or simply Swedish green, is a marble from quarries in Kolmården, in the north-eastern part of the province of Östergötland in Sweden. It is fine-grained, with a variable green colour and attractive veining, due to serpentines in the stone. It is considered one of the hardest marbles in the world.

Swedish green has been used extensively in buildings and monuments in Sweden and abroad.

== Notable buildings with Swedish green ==
- Stadshuset, Stockholm
- Stockholm Palace, Stockholm
- Drottningholm Palace, Stockholm
- Matchstick Palace, Stockholm
- University Hall, Uppsala
- Grimeton Radio Station, Varberg
- Rockefeller Center, New York City
- Paris Opera, Paris
- Bennelong Apartments, Sydney

== See also ==
- List of types of marble
