= Vápenný Podol =

- Municipality
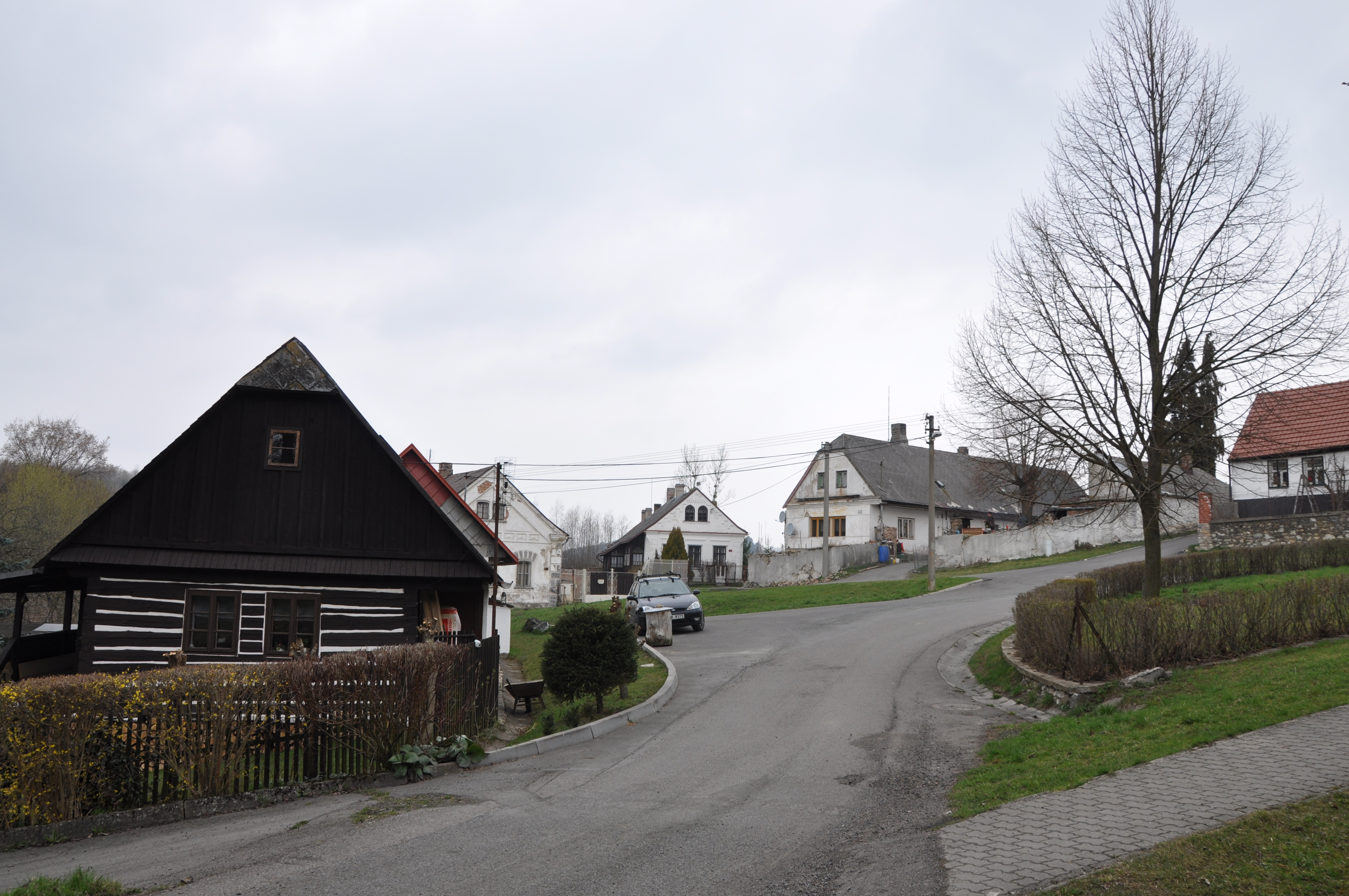
- Centre of Vápenný Podol

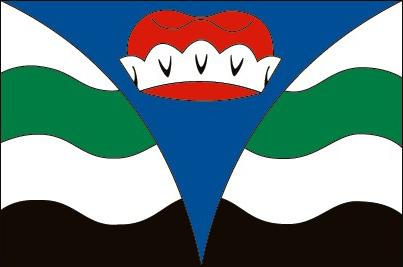
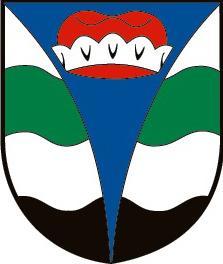
- Flag Coat of arms

- Location in the Czech Republic
- Coordinates: 49°53′21″N 15°40′0″E
- Country: Czech Republic
- Region: Pardubice
- District: Chrudim
- First mentioned: 1513

Area
  - Total: 9.12 km^{2} (3.52 sq mi)
- Elevation: 477 m (1,565 ft)

Population (2026-01-01)
  - Total: 311
  - Density: 34.1/km^{2} (88.3/sq mi)
- Time zone: UTC+1 (CET)
  - Summer (DST): UTC+2 (CEST)
- Postal code: 538 03
- Website: www.vapennypodol.cz

Vápenný Podol is a municipality and village in Chrudim District in the Pardubice Region of the Czech Republic. It has about 300 inhabitants.

== Administrative division ==
Vápenný Podol consists of three municipal parts (in brackets population according to the 2021 census):

- Vápenný Podol (271)
- Cítkov (12)
- Nerozhovice (28)

== History ==
The first written mention of Vápenný Podol is from 1513. It used to be a village with a spa, which was founded in the 1720s and was most prosperous in the first half of the 19th century.

== Demographics ==
Historical population
Year	Pop.	±%
1869	768	—
1880	942	+22.7%
1890	859	−8.8%
1900	810	−5.7%
1910	831	+2.6%
1921	808	−2.8%
1930	713	−11.8%
1950	488	−31.6%
1961	431	−11.7%
1970	371	−13.9%
1980	279	−24.8%
1991	192	−31.2%
2001	182	−5.2%
2011	224	+23.1%
2021	311	+38.8%
Source: Censuses
