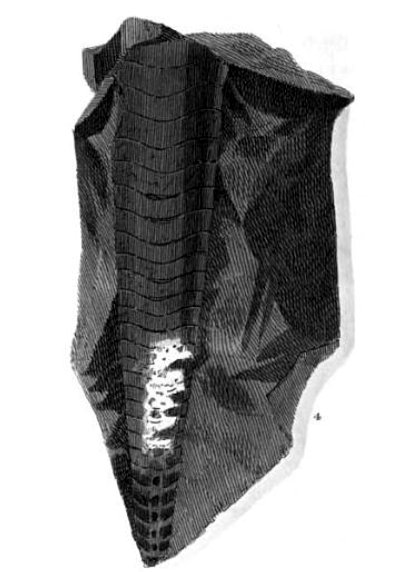
- L.breynii

Scientific classification
- Kingdom: Animalia
- Phylum: Mollusca
- Class: Cephalopoda
- Order: †Orthocerida
- Genus: †Loxoceras; M'Coy, 1844

= Loxoceras =

Loxoceras Temporal range: Early Carboniferous

Extinct genus of molluscs

Loxoceras is a genus of orthocerids of uncertain affinity, the shell of which is a smooth orthocone with the siphuncle between the center and probably the venter. Type species: Orthocera breyni Fleming 1928. May be equivalent to Breynioceras Foerse 1939. Loxoceras has been found in Lower Carboniferous marine strata in Europe
