= Sivry-Rance =

Municipality in Hainaut Province, Wallonia, Belgium

Sivry-Rance Chevri-Rance (Picard)
- Municipality
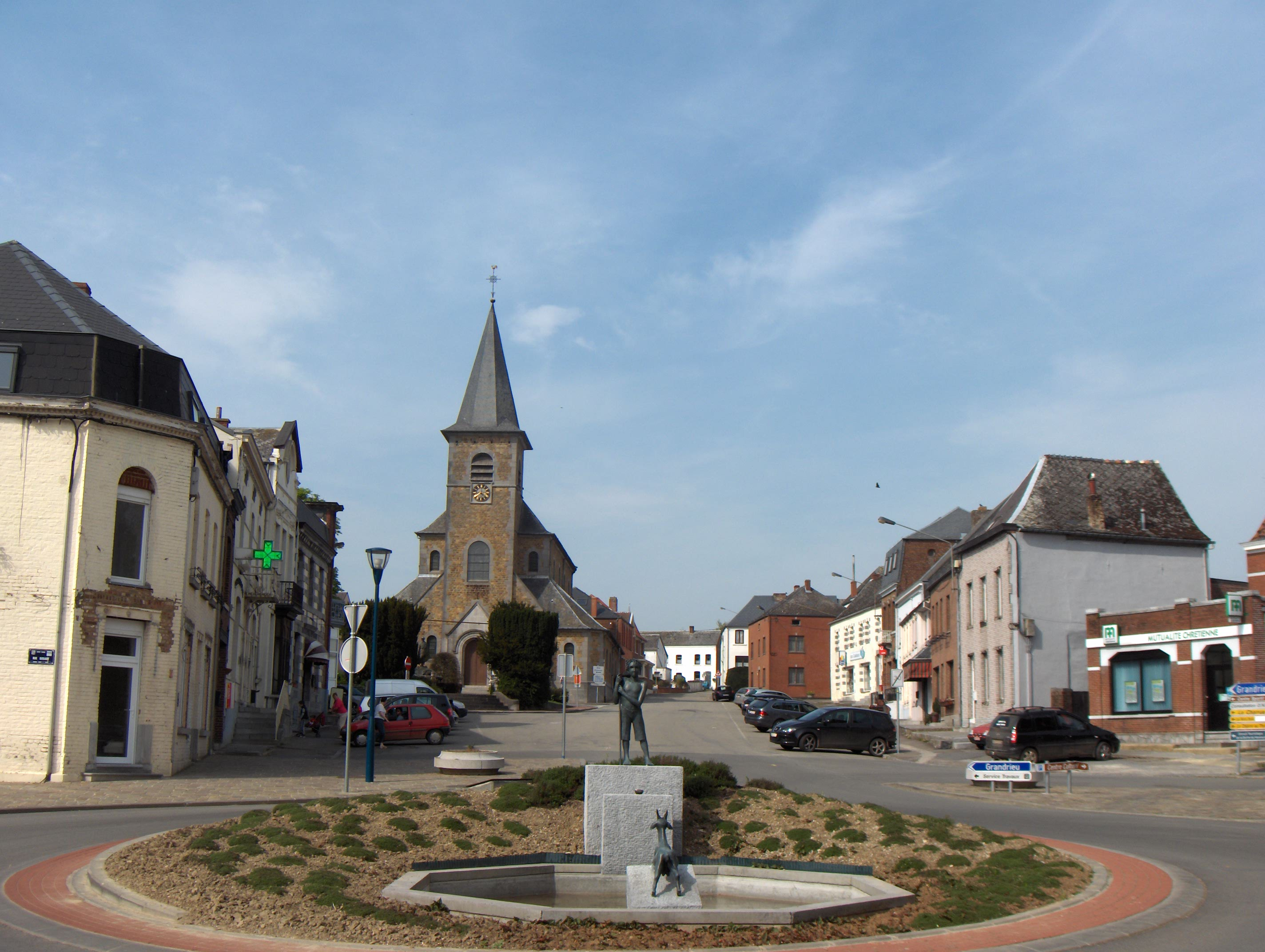

- Flag Coat of arms

- Location of Sivry-Rance in Hainaut
- Interactive map of Sivry-Rance
- Location in Belgium
- Coordinates: 50°09′N 04°13′E
- Country: Belgium
- Community: French Community
- Region: Wallonia
- Province: Hainaut
- Arrondissement: Thuin

Government
  - Mayor: Jean-Francois Gatelier (cdH) (MIL)
  - Governing party: MIL (Mouvement d'Interet Locaux)

Area
  - Total: 73.56 km^{2} (28.40 sq mi)

Population (2026-01-01)
  - Total: 4,828
  - Density: 65.63/km^{2} (170.0/sq mi)
- Postal codes: 6470
- NIS code: 56088
- Area codes: 060
- Website: www.sivry-rance.be

Sivry-Rance (French pronunciation: [sivʁi ʁɑ̃s]; Picard: Chevri-Rance) is a municipality of Wallonia located in the province of Hainaut, Belgium.

On January 1, 2018, Sivry-Rance had a total population of 4,833. The total area is 72.97 km^{2} which gives a population density of 63 inhabitants per km^{2}.

The municipality consists of the following districts: Grandrieu, Montbliart, Rance, Sautin, and Sivry.

== See also ==
- Rouge de Rance, a Devonian red reef limestone prized as a decorative building material
