= Noir de Golzinne =

Noir de Golzinne is the only Belgian black (Devonian/Frasnian) limestone (see Noir Belge) that is still exploited today. It is named after the quarry in the Belgian hamlet of Golzinne near Gembloux in the Walloon Region. "Noir de Golzinne" is also the trade name of the geological vein that is currently exploited in nearby Mazy. The names "Mazy" and "Golzinnes" are often used simultaneously.
