= Rouge Belge =

"Rouge Belge" is a collective noun designating diverse Devonian red limestone varieties found in Wallonia (Belgium).

Some names refer more specifically to the quarry were the material was found like the renowned "Rouge de Rance". Also Rouge Royal is a Belgian red limestone with a specific pattern of white and greyish veins. Rouge Royal is the trade name of the most well-known dimension stone from the area around Philippeville from several quarries.
