= Noir Belge =

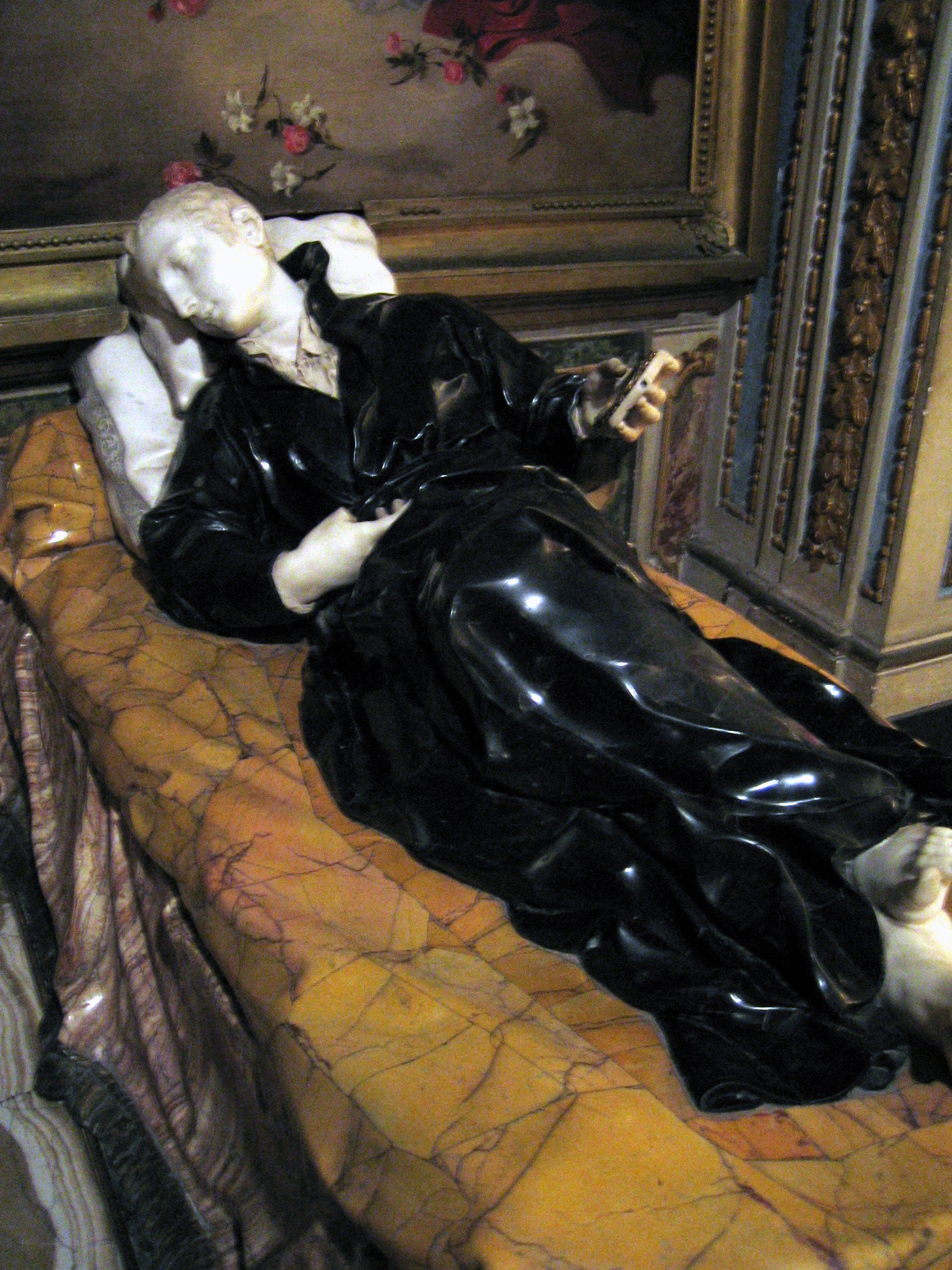
Stanislas Kostka on his Deathbed dressed in a habit of noir belge which effectfully offsets the white Carrara marble of the head, hands, feet and pillows. Statue by Pierre Le Gros the Younger, 1702–03, Rome, Jesuit Novitiate

Flooring in a fireplace at Modave Castle executed in Noir Belge in combination with white Carrara Marble and Rouge Belge.

Noir Belge (Belgian Black) is collective noun referring to black limestone found on several sites in Belgium. Some trade names refer more specifically to the quarry where the material was found, for example "Noir de Mazy" or "Noir de Golzinne". Some Noir belge marble deposit belongs to a fine-grained calcareous sedimentary formation dated Frasnian era (Upper Devonian – around 360 million years ago) and located on the northern border of Namur sedimentary basin. A few black limestones located in the lower Carboniferous (near the city of Dinant)

To the naked eye the differences between the black marbles from different quarries are almost impossible to determine. Good "Belgian Black" is dug as an inconspicuous grey stone but becomes immaculately deep black and shining as it is polished. Its relative scarcity is due to the difficult exploiting conditions (quarries in underground operation, for example of Golzinne and Bioul). Today it is one of the most expensive marbles in the world.

== History ==
Master Sculptor Ugo Togni in Pietrasanta (Italy) with gigantic Noir Belge marble statues-January 2007

"Noir Belge" has been exploited since Roman Antiquity when the Belgian provinces belonged to the Roman Imperium (Gallia Belgica). It was used in mosaics in local villas. The name "Paragone del Belgio" or "Diaspro del Belgio" of this marble originated from the use of Belgium black stones to test the content of gold in coinage.

Since Renaissance the "Noir Belge" marble was widely used as a decorative construction material. Due to its immaculate velvety black appearance and its remarkable high gloss, it was preferred by artisans across Europe. It became exceedingly widespread since it was preferred as the deep-black background for the colourful Intarsia or Pietra dura works from the Florentine Medici workshop founded in 1588. "Noir Belge" was even used by Italian artisans in the intarsia decoration of the Taj Mahal in India.

In northern Europe, especially in Belgium and France, "Noir Belge" was also applied to large decorative structures such as stairs, floorings, altars, fireplaces... It was often used in combination with white marble imported from Carrara but also with local red and grey marbles. It was applied on a large scale in chessboard floorings, for example in the Palace of Versailles and the Chateau of Vaux-le-Vicomte. Until the 1930s it remained popular in Art Deco decorations such as clocks and vases.

From First World War onward, the difficulties linked to the underground exploration of the quarries combined with the progressive exhaustion of the precious resource led to a progressive limitation of the use of this marble to the most exclusive and prestigious architectural and artistic creations.

Some buildings where "Noir Belge" was used;

- Palace of Versailles in France
- Carbide & Carbon Building in Chicago
- Waldorf Astoria Hotel in New York City, built in 1931

== See also ==
- List of types of marble
- Ashford Black Marble

== Sources ==
- "Les marbres belges à Versailles", by Prof. Eric Groessens (in French)
- "Les matériaux de construction de Belgique et du Nord de la France", by Prof. Eric Groessens (in French)
