= Rouge de Rance =

Red limestone from Rance, Belgium

Rouge de Rance (Red of Rance) is a Devonian red reef limestone from the town of Rance in the province of Hainaut (Wallonia, Belgium).

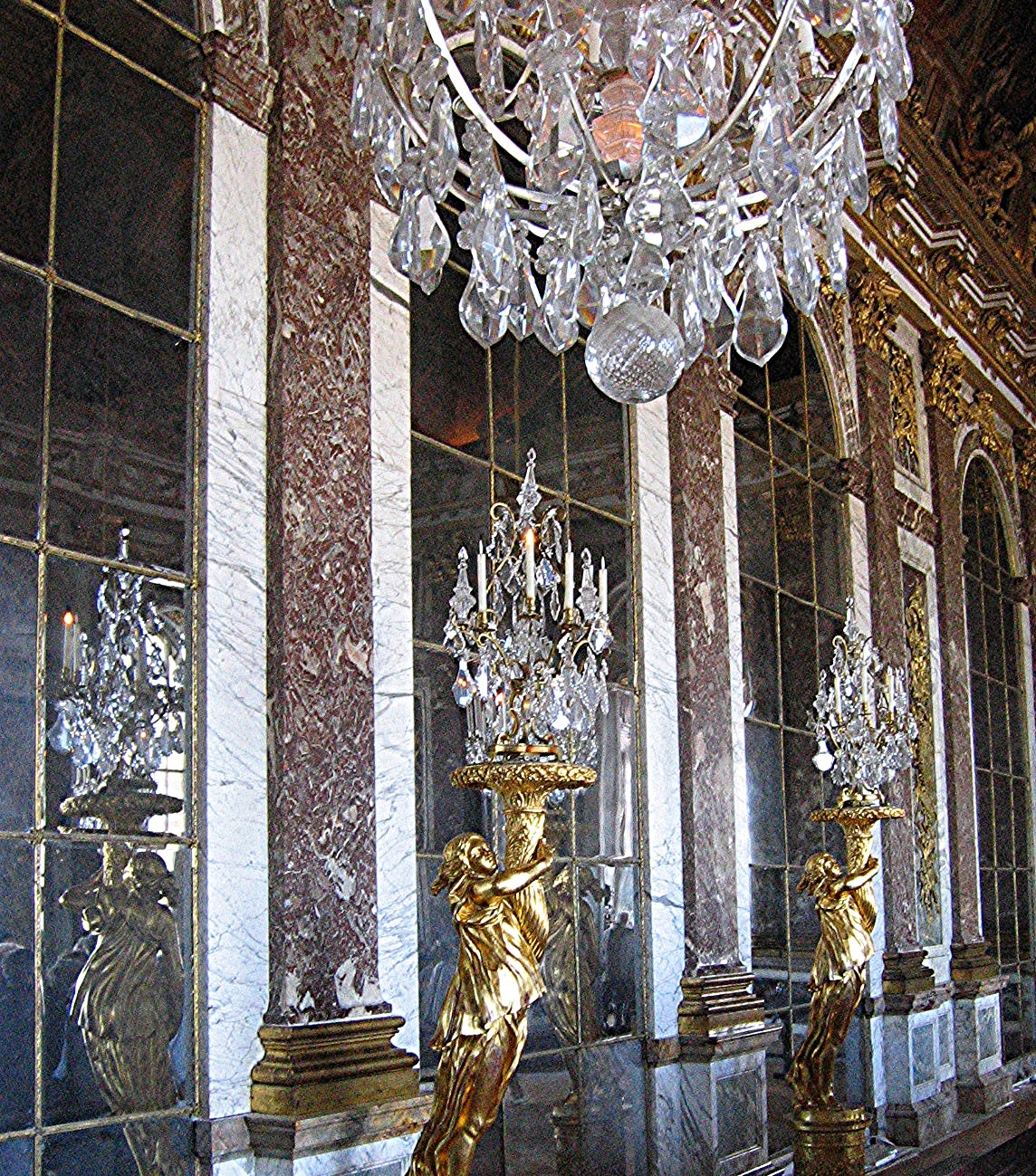
Pilasters in Rouge de Rance in the "Galerie des Glaces"

The red "marble" of Rance in the Belgian province of Hainaut knew a large popularity as a prestigious building material for decorative use. Although it was exploited since Roman Antiquity it became most renowned since the 17th century because of its prolific use in the Royal Chateau of Versailles built for the French king Louis XIV. Large quantities were used for the most prestigious parts of the building, including the interior wall decoration of the "Galerie des Glaces" (Hall of Mirrors) and the columns of the main portico on the "Cour des Marbres" (Marble Courtyard). To satisfy the vast demand needed for Versailles and other French royal residences a new quarry was opened and subsequently named "Trou de Versailles" (hole of Versailles).

Since the 18th century "Rouge de Rance" was also popular as a material for fireplaces and clocks, and as a top for furniture such as commodes, tables or Several Belgian red limestones, including "Rouge de Rance" were later marketed under the main name "Rouge Belge" (Belgian Red). These limestone varieties are commonly referred to as "red marble", although they are not real marbles but sedimentary rocks.

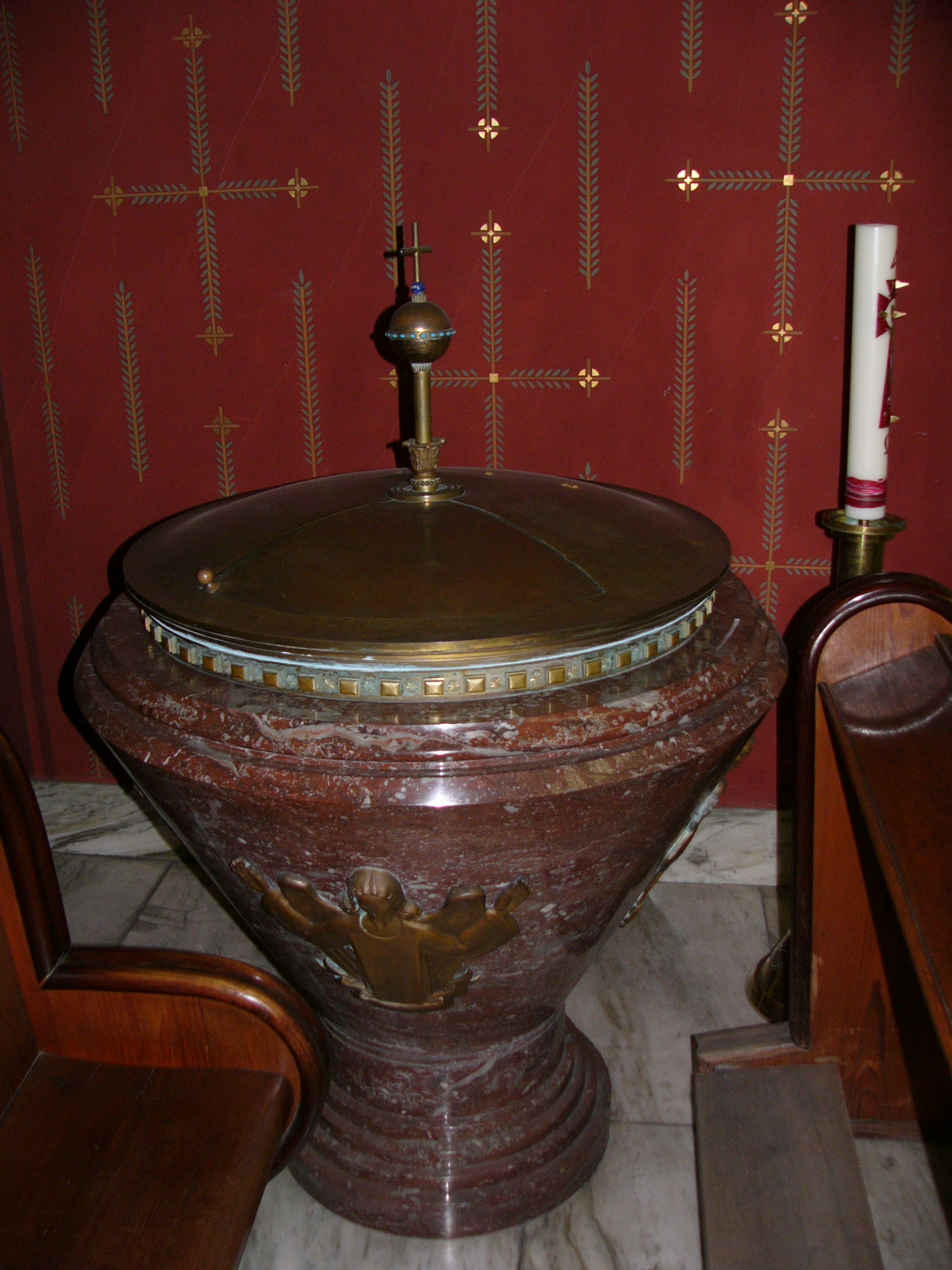
Baptismal font in Rouge de Rance in Sts. Cyril and Methodius's church in Olomouc.

The exploitation of the quarries in Rance stopped in the 1950s. A museum on Belgian Marbles was opened in Rance in 1979.

== Sources ==
- "Les marbres belges à Versailles", by Prof. Eric Groessens (in French)
- "Les matériaux de construction de Belgique et du Nord de la France", by Prof. Eric Groessens (in French)
- Marble museum of Rance (in French)
