= 2017–18 NK Maribor season =

NK Maribor
2017–18 season
- President: Drago Cotar
- Head Coach: Darko Milanič
- Stadium: Ljudski vrt
- Slovenian League: Runners-up
- Slovenian Cup: Quarter-finals
- Champions League: Group stage
- Top goalscorer: League: Luka Zahović (18); All: Marcos Tavares (22)
- Highest home attendance: 12,566 vs Spartak (13 September 2017)
- Lowest home attendance: 1,000 vs Gorica (2 December 2017)
- Average home league attendance: 3,509
Home colours	Away colours

The 2017–18 season was the 58th season in the history of Nogometni klub Maribor. It began on 1 June 2017 and concluded on 31 May 2018, with competitive matches played between July and May. It was the first season since 2007–08 in which Maribor did not win a single trophy during the season as the team lost the league title to Olimpija Ljubljana due to worse head-to-head record after finishing with the same number of points (80) in 36 rounds. Olimpija also eliminated Maribor in the quarter-finals of the Slovenian Cup. However, Maribor fared better in European competitions as the team reached the group stages of the UEFA Champions League for the third time in club's history.

32 different players represented the club in three competitions and there were 17 different goalscorers. Maribor's top goalscorer was Marcos Tavares, who scored 22 goals in 47 games.

== Transfers ==
In June 2017, Maribor signed Jean-Claude Billong and Jasmin Mešanović, both on a free transfer. Mešanović signed from Bosnian team Zrinjski Mostar, who were Maribor's opponents in the second qualifying round of the UEFA Champions League. Dejan Vokić, Martin Kramarič and Sunny Omoregie returned to squad after their loan spells ended. On 6 August 2017, Maribor signed Martin Milec, who already played for the club between 2010 and 2014. Dare Vršič, who was selected as the best player of the 2016–17 Slovenian PrvaLiga season, has re-signed with Maribor on 29 August 2017 after his previous contract with the club ran out after the 2016–17 season. On the same day, Maribor signed forward Adnan Ahmetović, who was the top goalscorer of the 2016–17 Slovenian U19 League. On the last day of the summer transfer window, Maribor acquired Israeli player Lior Inbrum on a season-long loan from Gent. In December 2017, Maribor announced a two new signings, a Malian defender Kassim Doumbia from FH and a Bosnian goalkeeper Kenan Pirić from Zrinjski. However, Maribor and Zrinjski reached an agreement that Pirić would stay at Zrinjski until the end of the season before joining Maribor in July 2018. On 12 January 2018, Maribor signed a Serbian defender Saša Ivković from Voždovac until 2021 for an undisclosed transfer fee. On 25 January 2018, Maribor acquired the Slovenian under-21 international forward Jan Mlakar from Fiorentina on a free transfer. On 13 February 2018, Maribor signed a three-and-a-half-year contract with Romanian defensive midfielder Alexandru Crețu, who previously played for Maribor's "eternal rivals" Olimpija Ljubljana.

Milivoje Novaković, who scored twelve goals in all competitions during the previous season, has retired. Defender Rodrigo Defendi and midfielder Sintayehu Sallalich have left the club after their contract ran out. On 1 August 2017, Žan Celar transferred to the Italian side Roma for a transfer fee of about €1 million. In December 2017, Jean-Claude Billong moved to the Serie A team Benevento for an undisclosed transfer fee, believed to be around €2 million. In January 2018, Matej Palčič left for Wisła Kraków. On the last day of the winter transfer window, Marwan Kabha signed with Hapoel Be'er Sheva.

In

No.	Position	Player	Transferred from	Fee	Date	Ref
3	DF	Jean-Claude Billong	Rudar Velenje	Free transfer	5 June 2017	
27	FW	Jasmin Mešanović	Zrinjski Mostar	Free transfer	21 June 2017	
22	DF	Martin Milec	Standard Liège	Undisclosed	6 August 2017	
	FW	Adnan Ahmetović	Koper	Free transfer	29 August 2017	
12	MF	Dare Vršič	Free agent	Free transfer	29 August 2017	
15	DF	Kassim Doumbia	FH	Free transfer	13 December 2017	
31	DF	Saša Ivković	Voždovac	Undisclosed	12 January 2018	
29	FW	Jan Mlakar	Fiorentina	Free transfer	25 January 2018	
8	MF	Alexandru Crețu	Olimpija Ljubljana	€100,000	13 February 2018	

Out

No.	Position	Player	Transferred to	Fee	Date	Ref
	DF	Damjan Vuklišević	Rudar Velenje	Free transfer	27 June 2017	
	DF	Robert Pušaver	Rudar Velenje	Undisclosed	27 June 2017	
11	FW	Milivoje Novaković	Retired	Free transfer	1 July 2017	
8	MF	Sintayehu Sallalich	Free agent	Free transfer	1 July 2017	
22	MF	Dare Vršič	Free agent	Free transfer	1 July 2017	
35	DF	Rodrigo Defendi	Aves	Free transfer	12 July 2017	
99	FW	Žan Celar	Roma	€1 million	1 August 2017	
3	DF	Jean-Claude Billong	Benevento	€2 million	20 December 2017	
29	DF	Matej Palčič	Wisła Kraków	Undisclosed	23 January 2018	
8	MF	Marwan Kabha	Hapoel Be'er Sheva	€400,000	31 January 2018	
72	MF	Dejan Vokić	Triglav Kranj	Free transfer	15 February 2018	

Loans in

No.	Position	Player	Loaned from	Loan commenced	Loan expired	Ref
99	MF	Lior Inbrum	Gent	31 August 2017	January 2018 (Note: Originally announced as a season-long loan; however, Inbrum returned to Gent in January 2018.)	

Loans out

No.	Position	Player	Loaned to	Loan commenced	Loan expired	Ref
	FW	Anel Hajrić	Radomlje	5 July 2017	End of season	
	FW	Adnan Ahmetović	Veržej	1 September 2017	January 2018	
18	MF	Sandi Ogrinec	Krško	24 January 2018	End of season	
44	DF	Denis Šme	Aluminij	25 January 2018	End of season	
17	FW	Luka Štor	Aluminij	1 February 2018	End of season	
	DF	Medin Bajrami	Ilirija 1911	7 February 2018	End of season	
25	MF	Ranko Moravac	Fužinar	19 February 2018	End of season	
14	FW	Sunny Omoregie	Alashkert	21 February 2018	End of season	

== Slovenian League ==
The 2017–18 season of the Slovenian PrvaLiga saw 10 teams play 36 matches; four against every other team, with two matches at each club's stadium. Three points were awarded for each win, one point per draw, and none for defeats. At the end of the season the top team qualified for the first qualifying round of the UEFA Champions League; teams in second and third qualified for the qualifying stages of the UEFA Europa League instead. The fixture list was released on 22 June 2017.

=== July–September ===
Maribor hosted Aluminij at Ljudski vrt on the opening weekend of the season. Aleks Pihler scored the only goal of the game early in the second half. In the second round, Maribor played against newly promoted Triglav Kranj. After 60 minutes, Triglav were leading 2–0; however, Maribor managed to turn the game around, scoring three goals in the last twenty minutes for a 3–2 victory. One week later, Maribor defeated Rudar Velenje 1–0 for the third consecutive league victory. Maribor ended July in second place with the same number of points (nine) as Olimpija Ljubljana. In the first week of August, Maribor defeated Ankaran Hrvatini 5–1 away from home, topping the league for the first time in the season. In the fifth round, Maribor failed to win a match for the first time in the season after a goalless draw against Domžale. A 95th-minute goal by Aleks Pihler secured three points against Krško in a 3–2 victory. Head coach Darko Milanič has made several changes to the starting lineup with a purpose to rest the players for the return leg of the Champions League play-offs against Hapoel Be'er-Sheva. The first derby of the season between "eternal rivals" Olimpija and Maribor, contested on 27 August 2017 at the Stožice Stadium in Ljubljana, has ended in a goalless draw.

After the international break in early September, Maribor contested in another goalless draw, this time against Celje at home. In the ninth round, a brace from Jasmin Mešanović secured three points against Gorica in a 3–0 victory. Maribor won another game with a score of 3–2 after a comeback in the last twenty minutes, this time against Aluminij; in this match, Lior Inbrum was sent-off on his debut appearance for the club. After two consecutive victories, Maribor contested in yet another goalless draw against Triglav at home.

=== October–December ===
In October, Maribor played three league games, against Ankaran Hrvatini at home and against Rudar Velenje and Domžale away, narrowly winning all three games, scoring four goals and conceding one. Three out of four team goals were scored by Mešanović. In the first week of November, Maribor secured their highest win of the season after defeating Krško 5–0, with a hat-trick scored by team captain Marcos Tavares and a brace by Aleksander Rajčević. In the second "Eternal derby" of the season on 17 November 2017, Maribor defeated Olimpija 1–0 at home in front of 9,000 spectators with another goal scored by Tavares, topping the league table for the first time since early August. However, in the next round, Maribor suffered their first defeat of the season, losing 2–1 in the "Styrian derby" against Celje. In this match, Tavares scored his 130th goal in the Slovenian top division, tying himself with Štefan Škaper as the all-time top goalscorer in the PrvaLiga. Tavares became the sole record holder when he scored a winning goal in the next round against Gorica in a 2–1 victory. In the last round of the autumn part of the season, Maribor should have played against Aluminij, but the match was postponed to February 2018 due to snowy conditions. Before the winter break, Maribor were top of the league with 43 points out of 18 games.

=== February–May ===
Maribor began the spring part of the season with a goalless draw at home against Aluminij on 25 February 2018. After the match against Triglav was postponed due to snow, Maribor contested in another home draw against Rudar and dropped to second place by early March, behind their rivals Olimpija. Maribor won their first match in the spring part of the season on 10 March after defeating Ankaran Hrvatini 3–0 with a goals by Dare Vršič, Luka Zahović, and Jasmin Mešanović, before suffering their first home defeat of the season in the next round against Domžale. This was followed by another home defeat, this time against Krško. After the match, during the press conference, Zlatko Zahovič, a Director of Football at Maribor, made a personal attack against the journalist of the sports newspaper EkipaSN, which caused a major controversy among the media and the public. As a result, Zahovič was suspended by the club and the Football Association of Slovenia. In the third "Eternal derby" of the season, Maribor and Olimpija drew 1–1 in Ljubljana as Olimpija retained a ten-point lead over Maribor after 25 matches. In the 26th round, Maribor ended their home ground winless drought after defeating Celje 3–2 with a hat-trick by Luka Zahović. At Stanko Mlakar Stadium, Maribor equalised their highest win of the season as they defeated Triglav 5–0 in a previously postponed match. In the next round, however, Maribor surpassed this record as they defeated Gorica 6–0 in Nova Gorica, extending their winning streak to three games, in which the team scored fourteen goals. In the two remaining games of April, Maribor defeated Aluminij and Triglav, reducing Olimpija's lead to only one point. Maribor began the last month of the season with another two victories, over Rudar and Ankaran, extending their winning streak to seven games, before drawing 1–1 with Domžale in the 32nd round after a 91st-minute equalizer by Tavares. In the next round, Maribor topped the league table for the first time since late February after defeating Krško 2–1 at Matija Gubec Stadium, while Olimpija dropped points against Ankaran. In the last derby of the season on 19 May, Maribor lost 3–2 to Olimpija after Andrés Vombergar's last-minute winner in front of 12,166 spectators, again dropping to second place. Maribor have won two remaining matches, 4–0 and 2–0 against Celje and Gorica, respectively, but lost the league title to Olimpija with the same number of points, but worse head-to-head record.

=== Matches ===
15 July 2017 1	Maribor	1–0	Aluminij	Maribor
20:20 CEST	Pihler 50'	Report	Mesec (yellow card) 85'; Jakšić (yellow card) 90'	Stadium: Ljudski vrt Attendance: 2,500; Referee: Dejan Balažič

22 July 2017 2	Triglav Kranj	2–3	Maribor	Kranj
16:50 CEST	Gvardjančič (yellow card) 15'; Bukara (yellow card) 50'; Majcen 55'; Poplatnik 60'; Robnik (yellow card) 72'	Report	Mešanović 71'; Pihler (yellow card) 77'; Bohar 86'; Tavares 88'	Stadium: Stanko Mlakar Stadium; Attendance: 1,500; Referee: Damir Skomina

29 July 2017 3	Maribor	1–0	Rudar Velenje	Maribor
20:20 CEST	Pihler (yellow card) 9'; Vrhovec 11'	Report	Tučić (yellow card) 34'	Stadium: Ljudski vrt Attendance: 2,200; Referee: Rade Obrenović

6 August 2017 4	Ankaran Hrvatini	1–5	Maribor	Dravograd
16:50 CEST	Kidrič 64'; Badžim (yellow card) 77'	Report	Kramarič 2'; Pihler 36'; Hotić 56'; Tavares 80'; Delgado 90' (o.g.)	Stadium: Dravograd Sports Centre; Attendance: 1,350; Referee: Roman Glažar

11 August 2017 5	Maribor	0–0	Domžale	Maribor
20:20 CEST	Rajčević (yellow card) 8'	Report	Husmani (yellow card) 56'	Stadium: Ljudski vrt Attendance: 4,200; Referee: Dragoslav Perić

19 August 2017 6	Maribor	3–2	Krško	Maribor
20:20 CEST	Bajde 17'; Pihler (yellow card) 66' (goal) 90+5'; Bohar 74'	Report	Ejup (yellow card) 10'; Kovačič 63'; Škrbić 81'; Jakolić (yellow card) 84'	Stadium: Ljudski vrt Attendance: 2,400; Referee: Nejc Kajtazović

27 August 2017 7	Olimpija Ljubljana	0–0	Maribor	Ljubljana
20:20 CEST	Oduwa (yellow card) 46'; Čanađija (yellow card) 90+3'	Report	Vrhovec (yellow card) 12'; Kabha (yellow card) 54'; Ahmedi (yellow card) 82'; Mešanović (yellow card) 89'	Stadium: Stožice; Attendance: 13,000; Referee: Damir Skomina

8 September 2017 8	Maribor	0–0	Celje	Maribor
20:20 CEST	Milec (yellow card) 17'; Kabha (yellow card) 82'	Report	Štraus (yellow card) 45'; Pišek (yellow card) 90+3'	Stadium: Ljudski vrt Attendance: 3,000; Referee: Matej Jug

17 September 2017 9	Gorica	0–3	Maribor	Nova Gorica
18:00 CEST		Report	Jogan 27' (o.g.); Mešanović 43', 60'; Billong (yellow card) 65'	Stadium: Sports Park; Attendance: 1,500; Referee: Damir Skomina

22 September 2017 10	Aluminij	2–3	Maribor	Kidričevo
20:20 CEST	Tahiraj 15'; Vrbanec (yellow card) 51'; Nunić 69'; Mensah (yellow card) 72'; Jakšić (yellow card) 82'	Report	Inbrum (yellow card) 55' (yellow-red card) 82'; Kabha (yellow card) 60'; Ahmedi 65'; Hotić (yellow card) 67' (goal) 89'; Billong 74'	Stadium: Sports Park; Attendance: 1,500; Referee: Rade Obrenović

30 September 2017 11	Maribor	0–0	Triglav Kranj	Maribor
20:20 CEST	Rajčević (yellow card) 53'; Milec (yellow card) 57'	Report	Bukara (yellow card) 59'; Poplatnik (yellow card) 80'; Zec (yellow card) 80'	Stadium: Ljudski vrt Attendance: 1,500; Referee: Asmir Sagrković

13 October 2017 12	Rudar Velenje	1–2	Maribor	Velenje
20:20 CEST	Mary 34'; Vuklišević (yellow card) 44'; Črnčič (yellow card) 66'; Vizinger (yellow card) 76'; Tomašević (red card) 88'	Report	Mešanović 52' (yellow card) 54'; Bohar 82'	Stadium: Ob Jezeru; Attendance: 2,500; Referee: Matej Jug

21 October 2017 13	Maribor	1–0	Ankaran Hrvatini	Maribor
20:20 CEST	Mešanović 40'	Report		Stadium: Ljudski vrt Attendance: 2,000; Referee: Vojko Goričan

28 October 2017 14	Domžale	0–1	Maribor	Domžale
20:20 CEST	Širok (yellow card) 21'; Vetrih (yellow card) 34'; Balkovec (yellow card) 90+4'; Klemenčič (yellow card) 90+4'	Report	Mešanović 58'; Vršič (yellow card) 77'	Stadium: Sports Park; Attendance: 1,800; Referee: Nejc Kajtazović

4 November 2017 15	Krško	0–5	Maribor	Krško
20:20 CET	Balić (yellow card) 74'	Report	Tavares 5', 11', 49'; Rajčević 13', 82'; Ahmedi (yellow card) 85'	Stadium: Matija Gubec Stadium; Attendance: 1,400; Referee: Damir Skomina

17 November 2017 16	Maribor	1–0	Olimpija Ljubljana	Maribor
20:20 CET	Tavares 6'; Vrhovec (yellow card) 24'; Kabha (yellow card) 53'; Viler (yellow card) 79'; Billong (yellow card) 90+4'	Report	Bajrić (yellow card) 29'; Kapun (yellow card) 37'; Čanađija (yellow card) 90+1'	Stadium: Ljudski vrt Attendance: 9,000; Referee: Matej Jug

25 November 2017 17	Celje	2–1	Maribor	Celje
20:20 CET	Džinić (yellow card) 30'; Požeg Vancaš 47'; Šušnjara (yellow card) 64'; Šauperl 90'; Jurhar (yellow card) 90+2'	Report	Vrhovec (yellow card) 90+3'; Tavares 90+4'	Stadium: Stadion Z'dežele; Attendance: 2,100; Referee: Dejan Balažič

2 December 2017 18	Maribor	2–1	Gorica	Maribor
20:20 CET	Bohar 43'; Billong (yellow card) 68'; Tavares 88'	Report	Celcer (yellow card) 26' (yellow-red card) 65'; Nwabueze (yellow card) 45' (goal) 49'	Stadium: Ljudski vrt Attendance: 1,000; Referee: Nejc Kajtazović

25 February 2018 19	Maribor	0–0	Aluminij	Maribor
15:00 CET	Milec (yellow card) 73'	Report	Kepir (yellow card) 22'	Stadium: Ljudski vrt Attendance: 1,500; Referee: Asmir Sagrković

11 April 2018 20	Triglav Kranj	0–5	Maribor	Kranj
15:00 CEST	Elsner (yellow card) 3'; Zec (yellow card) 11' (red card) 18'; Šmit (yellow card) 75'	Report	Zahović 13', 88'; Ivković (yellow card) 15'; Mlakar 19' (pen.); Šmit 39' (o.g.); Tavares 75'; Šuler (yellow card) 85'	Stadium: Stanko Mlakar Stadium; Attendance: 850; Referee: Mitja Žganec

6 March 2018 21	Maribor	2–2	Rudar Velenje	Maribor
16:00 CET	Tavares 64'; Mešanović 85'; Viler (yellow card) 90+3'	Report	Vasiljević (yellow card) 37'; Tučić 56'; Antonov (yellow card) 83'; Radić 90' (yellow card) 90'	Stadium: Ljudski vrt Attendance: 1,200; Referee: Dejan Balažič

10 March 2018 22	Ankaran Hrvatini	0–3	Maribor	Dravograd
15:00 CET	Bordon (yellow card) 62'	Report	Vršič 57'; Zahović 63'; Mešanović 74'; Bajde (yellow card) 76'	Stadium: Dravograd Sports Centre; Attendance: 1,000; Referee: Mitja Žganec

13 March 2018 23	Maribor	1–2	Domžale	Maribor
16:00 CET	Ivković (yellow card) 74'; Milec (yellow card) 78'; Vršič 89'	Report	Širok 10'; Vetrih (yellow card) 30'; Bizjak 48'; Dobrovoljc (yellow card) 72'; Ibričić (yellow card) 90'; Mulalić (yellow card) 90+3'	Stadium: Ljudski vrt Attendance: 2,000; Referee: Andrej Žnidaršič

17 March 2018 24	Maribor	0–2	Krško	Maribor
18:00 CET	Mešanović (yellow card) 23'; Ivković (yellow card) 47'; Viler (yellow card) 56'	Report	Volarič 32' (yellow card) 44'; Vekić (yellow card) 47' (goal) 49'; Mujan (yellow card) 81'; Ejup (yellow card) 84'	Stadium: Ljudski vrt Attendance: 1,500; Referee: Rade Obrenović

31 March 2018 25	Olimpija Ljubljana	1–1	Maribor	Ljubljana
20:30 CEST	Apau 69'; Uremović (yellow card) 73'	Report	Zahović 82' (yellow card) 84'	Stadium: Stožice; Attendance: 12,000; Referee: Matej Jug

7 April 2018 26	Maribor	3–2	Celje	Maribor
16:20 CEST	Zahović 16', 49', 70'	Report	Požeg Vancaš 25'; Lupeta 89'	Stadium: Ljudski vrt Attendance: 3,500; Referee: Dejan Balažič

15 April 2018 27	Gorica	0–6	Maribor	Nova Gorica
16:55 CEST	Kavčič (yellow card) 74'; Curk (yellow card) 85'	Report	Ivković 26'; Mlakar 29'; Hotić 30'; Hodžić (yellow card) 37'; Zahović 38'; Pihler (yellow card) 45'; Vrhovec 78'; Tavares 88'	Stadium: Sports Park; Attendance: 1,000; Referee: Nejc Kajtazović

21 April 2018 28	Aluminij	0–2	Maribor	Kidričevo
16:50 CEST	Zeba (yellow card) 43'; Horvat (yellow card) 67'	Report	Viler (yellow card) 5'; Mlakar 64'; Handanović (red card) 80'; Dervišević 89'	Stadium: Sports Park; Attendance: 1,200; Referee: Andrej Žnidaršič

28 April 2018 29	Maribor	2–1	Triglav Kranj	Maribor
16:50 CEST	Zahović 31', 35'; Ivković (red card) 64'	Report	Poplatnik 24' (yellow card) 39'; Bojić (yellow card) 70'; Robnik (yellow card) 74'; Majcen (yellow card) 83'	Stadium: Ljudski vrt Attendance: 4,000; Referee: Bojan Mertik

2 May 2018 30	Rudar Velenje	1–3	Maribor	Velenje
16:00 CEST	Antonov (yellow card) 34'; Bijol 75'; Parfitt-Williams (yellow card) 89'	Report	Tavares (yellow card) 33' (goal) 45', 59'; Hotić (yellow card) 66'; Zahović 84'	Stadium: Ob Jezeru; Attendance: 800; Referee: Rade Obrenović

5 May 2018 31	Maribor	5–1	Ankaran Hrvatini	Maribor
16:50 CEST	Ivković 7'; Viler (yellow card) 13'; Hotić 25'; Zahović 50'; Šuler (yellow card) 83'; Tavares 55', 90+2'	Report	Felipe Santos 38'; Mate (yellow card) 50'	Stadium: Ljudski vrt Attendance: 3,000; Referee: David Šmajc

9 May 2018 32	Domžale	1–1	Maribor	Domžale
16:00 CEST	Dobrovoljc (yellow card) 36'; Ibričić 51'; Širok (yellow card) 66'; Klemenčič (yellow card) 69'; Hodžić (yellow card) 83'	Report	Pihler (yellow card) 40'; Ivković (yellow card) 80'; Zahović (yellow card) 84'; Tavares 90+1'	Stadium: Sports Park; Attendance: 2,500; Referee: Matej Jug

12 May 2018 33	Krško	1–2	Maribor	Krško
16:50 CEST	Kovačič (yellow card) 25'; Vekić (yellow card) 81'; Balić 90+3'	Report	Dervišević 81' (yellow card) 90'; Šuler (yellow card) 85'; Zahović 88'	Stadium: Matija Gubec Stadium; Attendance: 1,000; Referee: Dejan Balažič

19 May 2018 34	Maribor	2–3	Olimpija Ljubljana	Maribor
20:30 CEST	Zahović 12', 52' (yellow card) 76'; Pihler (yellow card) 49'; Viler (yellow card) 60'; Šuler (yellow card) 61'; Handanović (yellow card) 73'	Report	Čanađija 3' (yellow card) 51'; Štiglec (yellow card) 27'; Andrés Vombergar (yellow card) 63' (goal) 89'; Kronaveter 74' (pen.)	Stadium: Ljudski vrt Attendance: 12,166; Referee: Damir Skomina

23 May 2018 35	Celje	0–4	Maribor	Celje
16:00 CEST	Stojinović (yellow card) 29'	Report	Ivković 30'; Zahović 35', 60', 69' (yellow card) 64'; Viler (yellow card) 55'; Hotić (yellow card) 71'	Stadium: Stadion Z'dežele; Attendance: 1,900; Referee: Andrej Žnidaršič

27 May 2018 36	Maribor	2–0	Gorica	Maribor
16:00 CEST	Tavares 20'; Vršič 22'; Pihler (yellow card) 74'; Vrhovec (yellow card) 75'	Report		Stadium: Ljudski vrt Attendance: 6,500; Referee: Nejc Kajtazović

Colour key: Green = Maribor win; Yellow = draw; Red = opponents win.

Notes

1. The match was originally scheduled on 10 December 2017, however, it was postponed to 25 February 2018 due to snow.
2. The match was originally scheduled on 3 March 2018, however, it was postponed to 11 April 2018 due to snow.

=== Classification ===
Pos	Team	Pld	W	D	L	GF	GA	GD	Pts	Qualification or relegation
1	Olimpija Ljubljana (C)	36	23	11	2	61	17	+44	80 (Note: Olimpija Ljubljana were ahead of Maribor on head-to-head away goals scored: Olimpija 3 goals, Maribor 1 goal.)	Qualification for the Champions League first qualifying round
2	Maribor	36	24	8	4	76	28	+48	80	Qualification for the Europa League first qualifying round (Note: Olimpija Ljubljana qualified for the Europa League first qualifying round by winning the 2017–18 Slovenian Football Cup. However, since they already qualified for European competition based on their league position, the spot awarded to them as the cup winners was passed to the fourth-placed team.)
3	Domžale	36	22	7	7	79	31	+48	73	Qualification for the Europa League first qualifying round
4	Rudar Velenje	36	15	5	16	50	49	+1	50 (Note: Rudar Velenje were ahead of Celje on head-to-head points: Rudar 9 pts, Celje 3 pts.)	Qualification for the Europa League first qualifying round
5	Celje	36	14	8	14	56	51	+5	50	

Source: PrvaLiga (in Slovene), Soccerway, UEFA.com
Rules for classification: 1) Points; 2) Head-to-head points; 3) Head-to-head goal difference; 4) Head-to-head away goals scored; 5) Goal difference; 6) Goals scored; 7) Away goals scored; 8) Fair play ranking; 9) Draw.
(C) Champions

==== Results summary ====
Overall								Home						Away					
Pld	W	D	L	GF	GA	GD	Pts	W	D	L	GF	GA	GD	W	D	L	GF	GA	GD
36	24	8	4	76	28	+48	80	10	5	3	26	16	+10	14	3	1	50	12	+38

Last updated: 27 May 2018.

==== Results by round ====
Round	1	2	3	4	5	6	7	8	9	10	11	12	13	14	15	16	17	18	19	20	21	22	23	24	25	26	27	28	29	30	31	32	33	34	35	36
Ground	H	A	H	A	H	H	A	H	A	A	H	A	H	A	A	H	A	H	H	A	H	A	H	H	A	H	A	A	H	A	H	A	A	H	A	H
Result	W	W	W	W	D	W	D	D	W	W	D	W	W	W	W	W	L	W	D	W	D	W	L	L	D	W	W	W	W	W	W	D	W	L	W	W
Position	4	3	2	1	2	2	2	2	2	2	2	2	2	2	2	1	2	1	1	1	2	2	2	2	3	3	2	2	2	2	2	2	1	2	2	2

Updated to match(es) played on 27 May 2018. Source:
A = Away; H = Home; W = Win; D = Draw; L = Loss

== Slovenian Cup ==
Maribor entered the competition in the Round of 16, receiving a bye as one of the four Slovenian teams that competed in the UEFA competitions during the season. Their opening match was a 3–0 away win against Tabor Sežana on 5 September 2017, with two goals scored by Jasmin Mešanović and one goal by Aleksander Rajčević. In the quarter-finals, Maribor was eliminated 4–1 on aggregate by their "Eternal rivals" Olimpija Ljubljana, failing to qualify for the semi-finals for the first time since the 2002–03 season.

5 September 2017 Round of 16	Tabor Sežana	0–3	Maribor	Sežana
16:00 CEST	Škerjanc (yellow card) 57'	Report	Rajčević 34'; Vrhovec (yellow card) 36'; Mešanović 78', 90'	Stadium: Rajko Štolfa Stadium; Attendance: 1,300; Referee: Roman Glažar

11 November 2017 Quarter-finals 1st leg	Olimpija Ljubljana	3–0	Maribor	Ljubljana
17:15 CET	Issah 11' (yellow card) 81'; Kapun 35', 90+3'	Report	Rajčević (yellow card) 69'	Stadium: Stožice Stadium; Attendance: 7,000; Referee: Roberto Ponis

29 November 2017 Quarter-finals 2nd leg	Maribor	1–1 (1–4 agg.)	Olimpija Ljubljana	Maribor
20:15 CET	Billong (yellow card) 13'; Bajde 15' (yellow card) 46'; Tavares (yellow card) 19'; Mešanović (yellow card) 59'	Report	Klinar (yellow card) 26'; Ilić (yellow card) 37'; Kronaveter 44'	Stadium: Ljudski vrt Attendance: 3,000; Referee: Dragoslav Perić

Colour key: Green = Maribor win; Yellow = draw; Red = opponents win.

== UEFA Champions League ==
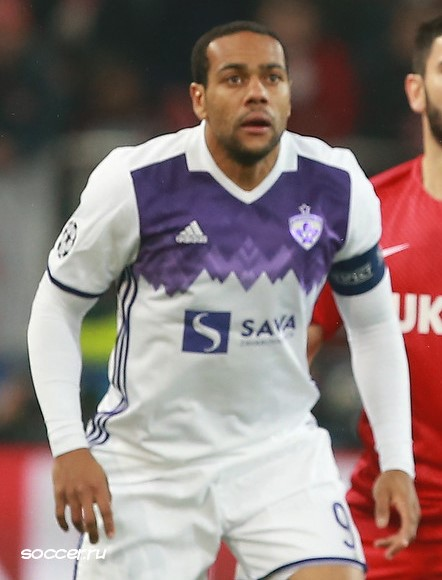
Marcos Tavares has scored four out of seven team goals in the qualifying rounds.

The UEFA Champions League is a continental club football competition organised by UEFA. Founded in the 1950s as the European Champion Clubs' Cup, the competition was open to champion clubs of each country and arranged as a straight knockout tournament. The growth of television rights saw the format rebranded in the 1990s to include a group stage and permit multiple entrants. Maribor have qualified for the group stage in 1999–2000 and 2014–15, when they finished in fourth place in the group on both occasions.

=== Qualifying rounds ===
Maribor began the European campaign in the second qualifying round. They were drawn against Zrinjski Mostar, a team they have already met in the same stage of the competition during the 2014–15 season. In the first leg in Mostar, Maribor secured a 2–1 win with a goals by Luka Zahović and Marcos Tavares; Blaž Vrhovec was also sent off after receiving two yellow cards. In the second leg, Zrinjski took the lead early in the game, before Mitja Viler equalised for the final score of 1–1, thus Maribor eliminated Zrinjski 3–2 on aggregate. Maribor continued in the third qualifying round, where they defeated FH 2–0 on aggregate; Tavares scored both goals for Maribor. In the play-off round, Maribor eliminated Israeli side Hapoel Be'er Sheva. The first match in Israel has finished 2–1 for the home side, with Tavares scoring his four European goal of the season. In the return leg in Maribor, Viler scored the only goal of the match in a 1–0 victory, sending Maribor through to the group stage of the competition for the third time in the club's history due to away goals rule.

==== Second qualifying round ====
12 July 2017	Zrinjski Mostar (Bosnia and Herzegovina)	1–2	(Slovenia) Maribor	Stadion pod Bijelim Brijegom, Mostar
19:00 CEST	Mulahusejnović (yellow card) 82'; Todorović 89'; Stojkić (yellow card) 90+3'	Report	Šuler (yellow card) 10'; Zahović 43'; Hotić (yellow card) 62'; Vrhovec (yellow card) 63' (yellow-red card) 68'; Tavares 90+4' (pen.)	Attendance: 7,000; Referee: Daniel Siebert (Germany)

19 July 2017	Maribor (Slovenia)	1–1 (3–2 agg.)	(Bosnia and Herzegovina) Zrinjski Mostar	Ljudski vrt, Maribor
20:15 CEST	Viler 27'	Report	Todorović 7'; Bilbija (yellow card) 87'	Attendance: 9,266; Referee: Ola Hobber Nilsen (Norway)

Colour key: Green = Maribor win; Yellow = draw; Red = opponents win.

==== Third qualifying round ====
26 July 2017	Maribor (Slovenia)	1–0	(Iceland) FH	Ljudski vrt, Maribor
20:20 CEST	Tavares 54'	Report		Attendance: 8,166; Referee: Andris Treimanis (Latvia)

2 August 2017	FH (Iceland)	0–1 (0–2 agg.)	(Slovenia) Maribor	Kaplakriki, Hafnarfjörður
20:30 CEST	Doumbia (yellow card) 56'; D. Vidarsson (yellow card) 69'; Gudnason (yellow card) 74'; P. Vidarsson (yellow card) 90+3'; Bödvarsson (yellow card) 90+5'	Report	Viler (yellow card) 37'; Vrhovec (yellow card) 50'; Šuler (yellow card) 75'; Tavares 90+2'; Rajčević (yellow card) 90+3'; Hotić (yellow card) 90+6'	Attendance: 2,563; Referee: Peter Kráľovič (Slovakia)

Colour key: Green = Maribor win; Yellow = draw; Red = opponents win.

==== Play-off round ====
16 August 2017	Hapoel Be'er Sheva (Israel)	2–1	(Slovenia) Maribor	Turner Stadium, Be'er Sheva
20:45 CEST	Nwakaeme 12'; Tzedek 45+2' (pen.); Melikson (yellow card) 81'	Report	Tavares 10'; Vrhovec (yellow card) 45+1'; Viler (yellow card) 77'	Attendance: 15,265; Referee: Jonas Eriksson (Sweden)

22 August 2017	Maribor (Slovenia)	1–0 (2–2 (a) agg.)	(Israel) Hapoel Be'er Sheva	Ljudski vrt, Maribor
20:45 CEST	Viler (yellow card) 10' (goal) 15'; Kabha (yellow card) 80'	Report	Ghadir (yellow card) 19'; Elhamed (yellow card) 29'; Taha (yellow card) 51'; Bitton (yellow card) 73'	Attendance: 12,066; Referee: Gianluca Rocchi (Italy)

Colour key: Green = Maribor win; Yellow = draw; Red = opponents win.

=== Group stage ===
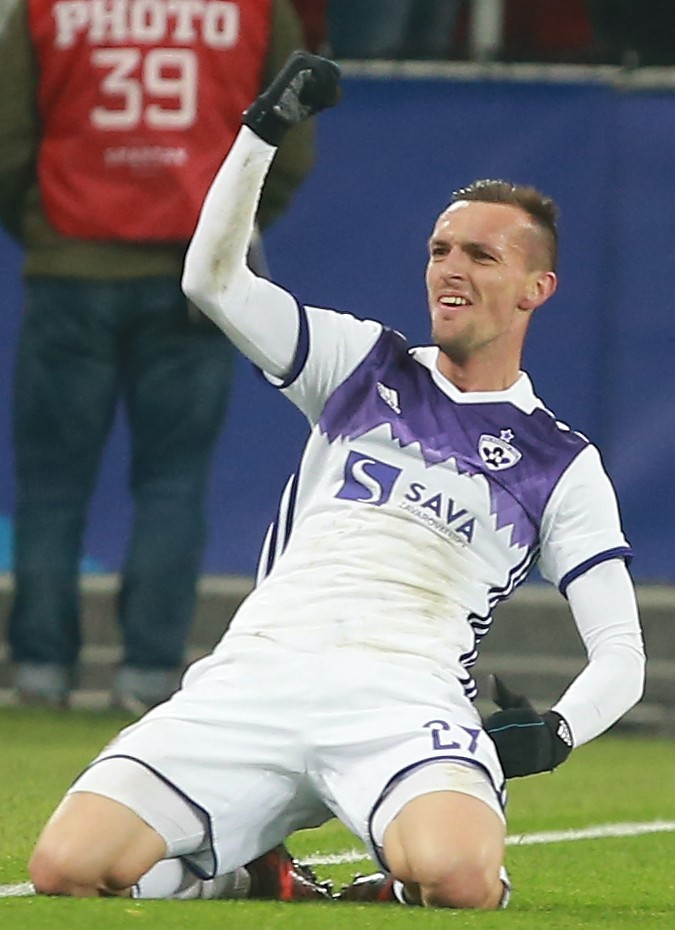
Jasmin Mešanović celebrating a last-minute equalizer in Moscow.

Maribor were drawn in Group E, along with Spartak Moscow, Sevilla, and Liverpool. The club opened their group stage campaign with a 1–1 home draw against Spartak. Damjan Bohar scored the equalising goal late in the game. In the second matchday, Maribor suffered a 3–0 defeat against Sevilla after a hat-trick by Ben Yedder. In the third round, Maribor suffered their biggest home defeat in European competitions as the team lost 7–0 to Liverpool. Liverpool repeated the feat in the home match at Anfield, defeating Maribor 3–0. Maribor secured their second point in the fifth round in Moscow, again drawing 1–1 with Spartak, with Jasmin Mešanović scoring a last-minute goal. Maribor concluded their European season with a home draw against Sevilla, finishing the competition in fourth place with three points out of six games.

==== Group E ====
Pos	Team	Pld	W	D	L	GF	GA	GD	Pts	Qualification	LIV	SEV	SPM	MRB
1	(England) Liverpool	6	3	3	0	23	6	+17	12	Advance to knockout phase	—	2–2	7–0	3–0
2	(Spain) Sevilla	6	2	3	1	12	12	0	9	Advance to knockout phase	3–3	—	2–1	3–0
3	(Russia) Spartak Moscow	6	1	3	2	9	13	−4	6	Transfer to Europa League	1–1	5–1	—	1–1
4	(Slovenia) Maribor	6	0	3	3	3	16	−13	3		0–7	1–1	1–1	—

Source: UEFA
Rules for classification: Group stage tiebreakers

13 September 2017 1	Maribor (Slovenia)	1–1	(Russia) Spartak Moscow	Maribor, Slovenia
20:45 CEST	Bohar 85'	Report	Dzhikiya (yellow card) 36'; Samedov 59'	Stadium: Ljudski vrt Attendance: 12,566; Referee: Deniz Aytekin (Germany)

26 September 2017 2	Sevilla (Spain)	3–0	(Slovenia) Maribor	Seville, Spain
20:45 CEST	Ben Yedder 27', 38', 83' (pen.); Escudero (yellow card) 56'	Report		Stadium: Ramón Sánchez Pizjuán; Attendance: 34,705; Referee: Aleksei Kulbakov (Belarus)

17 October 2017 3	Maribor (Slovenia)	0–7	(England) Liverpool	Maribor, Slovenia
20:45 CEST	Milec (yellow card) 45'; Vrhovec (yellow card) 80'; Hotić (yellow card) 89'	Report	Firmino 4', 54'; Coutinho 13'; Salah 19', 40'; Oxlade-Chamberlain 86'; Alexander-Arnold 90'	Stadium: Ljudski vrt Attendance: 12,506; Referee: Viktor Kassai (Hungary)

1 November 2017 4	Liverpool (England)	3–0	(Slovenia) Maribor	Liverpool, England
20:45 CET	Salah 49'; Can 64'; Sturridge 90'	Report	Bohar (yellow card) 22'; Rajčević (yellow card) 52'	Stadium: Anfield; Attendance: 47,957; Referee: Ivan Kružliak (Slovakia)

21 November 2017 5	Spartak Moscow (Russia)	1–1	(Slovenia) Maribor	Moscow, Russia
18:00 CET	Popov (yellow card) 49'; Luiz Adriano (yellow card) 51'; Kutepov (yellow card) 62'; Zé Luís 82'	Report	Vrhovec (yellow card) 23'; Mešanović 90+2'	Stadium: Otkrytiye Arena; Attendance: 42,920; Referee: Willie Collum (Scotland)

6 December 2017 6	Maribor (Slovenia)	1–1	(Spain) Sevilla	Maribor, Slovenia
20:45 CET	Tavares 10'; Pihler (yellow card) 35'; Bohar (yellow card) 50'; Milec (yellow card) 77'	Report	Ganso 75'	Stadium: Ljudski vrt Attendance: 11,976; Referee: Ovidiu Hațegan (Romania)

Colour key: Green = Maribor win; Yellow = draw; Red = opponents win.

== Friendlies ==
=== June–July ===
To prepare for the forthcoming season, Maribor played a series of friendlies across Eastern Slovenia. Their first match ended in defeat against Osijek of the Croatian First Football League; Valon Ahmedi scored the opening goal of the season for Maribor in the first half, before Osijek turned the game around in the second half for a 2–1 victory. Maribor then played out a 1–1 draw against Shkëndija, with both goals of the game scored in the first ten minutes. Maribor recorded their first victory of the pre-season against the Russian side Ural. The first goal was scored by newly-signed Jasmin Mešanović in the 62nd minute, while Gregor Bajde scored the second goal just one minute later for the final 2–0. During the next few days, Maribor narrowly won two more games, defeating Macedonian champions Vardar and Romanian team Dinamo București, 1–0 and 2–1 respectively. Maribor concluded their pre-season with two defeats, against Croatian first division side Inter Zaprešić and the Russian Premier League side Krasnodar. During the match against Inter, Mešanović and Ahmedi have picked up injuries and have been substituted in the first half.

16 June 2017 1	Maribor (Slovenia)	1–2	(Croatia) Osijek	Maribor, Slovenia
19:00 CEST	Ahmedi 31'	Report	Ejupi 60', 65'	Stadium: Training Centre Pohorje; Referee: Samo Veselič (Slovenia)

20 June 2017 2	Maribor (Slovenia)	1–1	(North Macedonia) Shkëndija	Odranci, Slovenia
18:00 CEST	Bohar 6'	Report	Ibraimi 10'	Stadium: ŠRC Odranci; Referee: Bojan Mertik (Slovenia)

22 June 2017 3	Maribor (Slovenia)	2–0	(Russia) Ural	Bakovci, Slovenia
18:00 CEST	Mešanović 62'; Bajde 63'	Report		Stadium: ŠRC Bakovci; Referee: Simon Grlec (Slovenia)

24 June 2017 4	Maribor (Slovenia)	1–0	(North Macedonia) Vardar	Gornja Radgona, Slovenia
18:00 CEST	Mešanović 42'	Report		Stadium: Gornja Radgona Stadium; Referee: Simon Grlec (Slovenia)

28 June 2017 5	Maribor (Slovenia)	2–1	(Romania) Dinamo București	Limbuš, Slovenia
18:00 CEST	Zahović 55' (pen.); Šuler 59'; Vrhovec (yellow card) 69' (yellow-red card)	Report	Costache 74'	Stadium: Pod Grajskim gričem Referee: Bojan Tkalčič (Slovenia)

1 July 2017 6	Maribor (Slovenia)	1–2	(Croatia) Inter Zaprešić	Bakovci, Slovenia
18:00 CEST	Tavares 83'	Report	Čirjak 3'; Mazalović 59' (pen.)	Stadium: ŠRC Bakovci; Referee: Darjan Kovačič (Slovenia)

6 July 2017 7	Maribor (Slovenia)	0–2	(Russia) Krasnodar	Maribor, Slovenia
18:30 CEST		Report	Claesson 9', 51'	Stadium: Ljudski vrt Attendance: 1,500; Referee: Tadej Mežnar (Slovenia)

Colour key: Green = Maribor win; Yellow = draw; Red = opponents win.

=== January–March ===
During the winter break, Maribor played several friendly matches at their home stadium, Ljudski vrt, and in Belek, Turkey.

17 January 2018 1	Maribor	7–0	Radomlje	Maribor, Slovenia
15:00 CET	Bohar 14', 38'; Mešanović 22'; Tavares 32'; Ivković 52'; Dervišević 74' (pen.); Jazbec 78' (o.g.)	Report		Stadium: Ljudski vrt Referee: Tadej Mežnar

20 January 2018 2	Maribor	4–2	Nafta 1903	Maribor, Slovenia
15:00 CET	Vršič 17'; Tavares 42' (pen.); Hotić 66'; Bajde 83'	Report	Monjac 14'; Vinko 60'	Stadium: Ljudski vrt Referee: Bojan Tkalčič

24 January 2018 3	Maribor (Slovenia)	1–1	(Hungary) Haladás	Maribor, Slovenia
14:00 CET	Vrhovec 79'	Report	Ramos 60'	Stadium: Ljudski vrt Referee: Slavko Vinčić (Slovenia)

27 January 2018 4	Maribor (Slovenia)	3–0	(Austria) SC Weiz	Maribor, Slovenia
15:00 CET	Zahović 50'; Tavares 63'; Mlakar 86'	Report		Stadium: Ljudski vrt Referee: Slavko Vinčić (Slovenia)

30 January 2018 5	Maribor (Slovenia)	2–2	(Serbia) Vojvodina	Belek, Turkey
15:00 CET	Bajde 68'; Tavares 101'	Report	Kolmanič 6' (o.g.); Nešković 98'	Stadium: Titanic Deluxe Sports Centre; Referee: Kris Jakubik (Poland)

2 February 2018 6	Maribor (Slovenia)	0–3	(Czech Republic) Sigma Olomouc	Belek, Turkey
15:30 CET		Report	Hála 2', 14'; Plšek 25'	Stadium: Susesi Sport Center; Referee: Tomasz Kwiatkowski (Poland)

5 February 2018 7	Maribor (Slovenia)	2–0	(Moldova) Sheriff Tiraspol	Belek, Turkey
15:00 CET	Zahović 82' (pen.); Mlakar 90'	Report		Stadium: Susesi Sport Center; Referee: Vitaliy Romanov (Ukraine)

8 February 2018 8	Maribor (Slovenia)	0–2	(Ukraine) Oleksandriya	Belek, Turkey
15:00 CET	Hodžić (red card) 88'	Report	Hrytsuk 70' (pen.); Hitchenko 90+3'	Stadium: Susesi Sport Center; Referee: Sergey Gorokhovodovsky (Kazakhstan)

10 February 2018 9	Maribor (Slovenia)	1–3	(Russia) Zenit	Belek, Turkey
10:00 CET	Tavares 49'	Report	Rigoni 14'; Kokorin 32'; Pletnev 81'	Stadium: Mardan Sports Complex; Referee: Igor Chesnokov (Kazakhstan)

17 February 2018 10	Maribor	4–1	Celje	Maribor, Slovenia
17:00 CET	Zahović 17', 33', 89'; Milec 65'	Report	Lupeta 67'	Stadium: Ljudski vrt Referee: Tadej Mežnar

24 March 2018 11	Sturm Graz (Austria)	1–2	(Slovenia) Maribor	Gleinstätten, Austria
15:00 CET	Edomwonyi 13'	Report	Ahmedi 33'; Bohar 36'

Colour key: Green = Maribor win; Yellow = draw; Red = opponents win.

== Squad statistics ==
Maribor used a total of 32 players during the 2017–18 season and there were 17 different goalscorers. Tavares featured in 47 matches – the most of any Maribor player in the campaign. The highest scorer was also Tavares, with 22 goals in all competitions, followed by Zahović who scored 19 goals. Zahović became the top goalscorer of the Slovenian PrvaLiga with 18 goals; all of them were scored in the second part of the season. Four Maribor players were sent off during the season: Vrhovec, Ivković, Handanović, and Inbrum.

Key

No. = Squad number

Pos = Playing position

Nat. = Nationality

Apps = Appearances

GK = Goalkeeper

DF = Defender

MF = Midfielder

FW = Forward

= Yellow cards

= Red cards

No.	Pos.	Nat.	Name	Slovenian PrvaLiga		Slovenian Cup		Champions League		Total		Discipline	
No.	Pos.	Nat.	Name	Apps	Goals	Apps	Goals	Apps	Goals	Apps	Goals	A yellow rectangular card	A red rectangular card
1	GK	SVN	Aljaž Cotman	2	0	0	0	0	0	2	0	0	0
2	DF	SVN	Adis Hodžić	5	0	0	0	0	0	5	0	1	0
3	DF	FRA	Jean-Claude Billong	14	1	1	0	5	0	20	1	4	0
4	DF	SVN	Marko Šuler	25	0	1	0	11	0	37	0	6	0
5	MF	SVN	Blaž Vrhovec	21	2	2	0	10	0	33	2	11	1
6	MF	SVN	Aleks Pihler	30	3	1	0	12	0	43	3	8	0
7	MF	ALB	Valon Ahmedi	16	1	1	0	10	0	27	1	2	0
8	MF	ISR	Marwan Kabha	13	0	2	0	12	0	27	0	5	0
8	MF	ROM	Alexandru Crețu	6	0	0	0	0	0	6	0	0	0
9	FW	BRA	Marcos Tavares	32	17	3	0	12	5	47	22	2	0
10	MF	SVN	Dino Hotić	30	4	2	0	10	0	42	4	6	0
11	FW	SVN	Luka Zahović	25	18	0	0	5	1	30	19	4	0
12	MF	SVN	Dare Vršič	22	3	3	0	2	0	27	3	1	0
14	FW	NGR	Sunny Omoregie	2	0	0	0	0	0	2	0	0	0
18	MF	SVN	Sandi Ogrinec	2	0	1	0	0	0	3	0	0	0
20	FW	SVN	Gregor Bajde	18	1	3	1	9	0	30	2	2	0
21	MF	SVN	Amir Dervišević	15	2	0	0	0	0	15	2	1	0
22	DF	SVN	Martin Milec	25	0	2	0	8	0	35	0	6	0
23	DF	SVN	Žan Kolmanič	4	0	1	0	0	0	5	0	0	0
26	DF	SVN	Aleksander Rajčević	17	2	2	1	10	0	29	3	5	0
27	FW	BIH	Jasmin Mešanović	30	8	3	2	9	1	42	11	4	0
28	DF	SVN	Mitja Viler	32	0	2	0	12	2	46	2	10	0
29	DF	SVN	Matej Palčič	7	0	2	0	4	0	13	0	0	0
29	FW	SLO	Jan Mlakar	12	3	0	0	0	0	12	3	0	0
31	DF	SRB	Saša Ivković	16	3	0	0	0	0	16	3	4	1
32	DF	MNE	Luka Uskoković	2	0	1	0	0	0	3	0	0	0
33	GK	SVN	Jasmin Handanović	33	0	1	0	12	0	46	0	1	1
39	MF	SVN	Damjan Bohar	21	4	3	0	10	1	34	5	2	0
44	DF	SVN	Denis Šme	1	0	1	0	0	0	2	0	0	0
69	GK	CRO	Matko Obradović	2	0	2	0	0	0	4	0	0	0
97	FW	SVN	Martin Kramarič	22	1	1	0	3	0	26	1	0	0
99	MF	ISR	Lior Inbrum	2	0	0	0	0	0	2	0	2	1

== See also ==
- List of NK Maribor seasons
