= Morje, Rače-Fram =

Morje
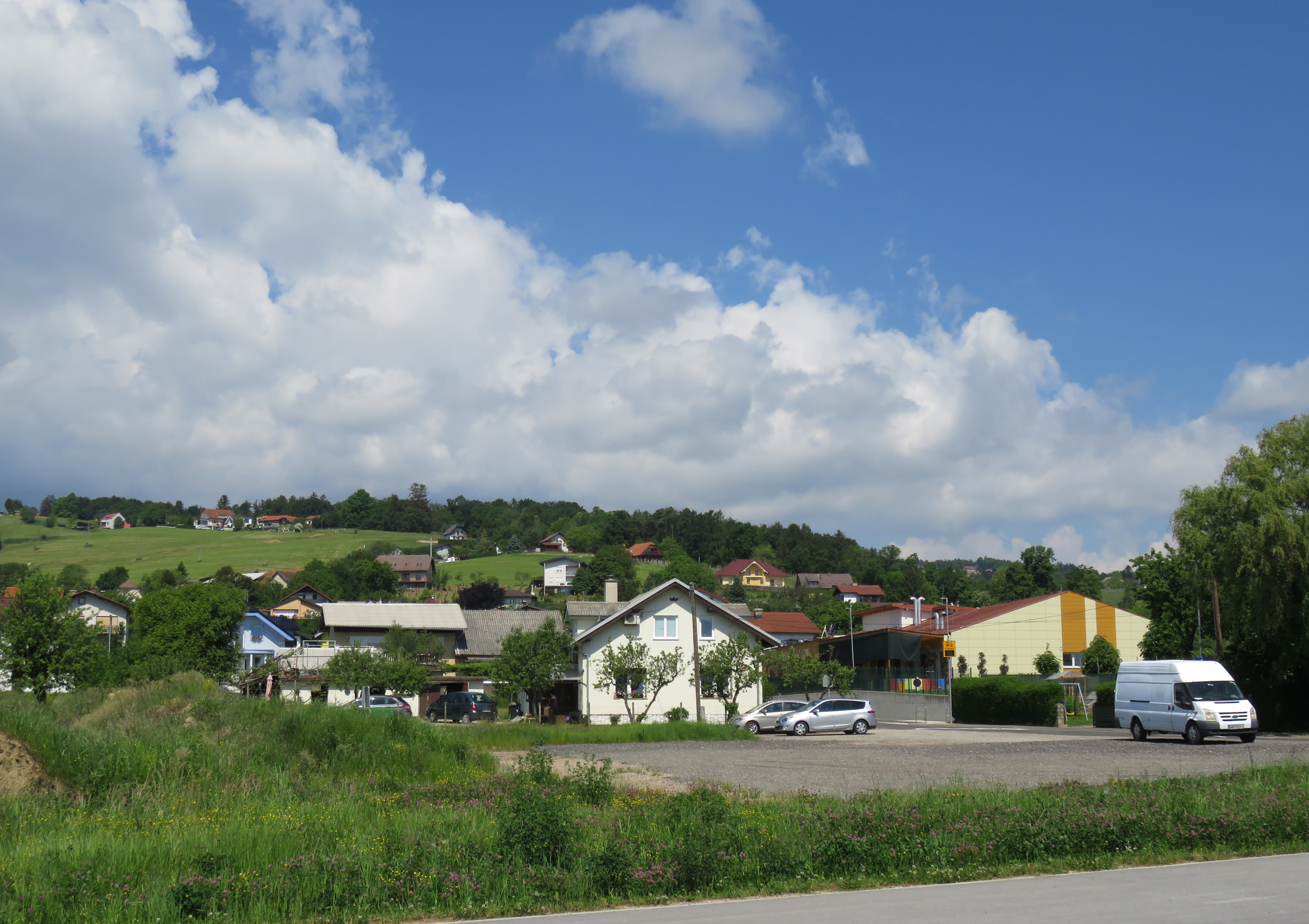

- Location in Slovenia
- Coordinates: 46°26′41.73″N 15°37′18.8″E
- Country: Slovenia
- Traditional region: Styria
- Statistical region: Drava
- Municipality: Rače–Fram

Area
  - Total: 3.42 km^{2} (1.32 sq mi)
- Elevation: 311.6 m (1,022 ft)

Population (2002)
  - Total: 744

Morje (pronounced [ˈmoːɾjɛ]; German: Mauerbach) is a settlement in the Municipality of Rače–Fram in northeastern Slovenia. It lies on the eastern edge of the Pohorje Hills south of Fram. The area is part of the traditional region of Styria. The entire municipality is now included in the Drava Statistical Region.

== Name ==
The origin of the name Morje is unclear. It is not attested in historical sources and may be of substrate origin, possibly from the proto-Romance root *marra 'gravel; mountain stream'. Other possible origins include Slovene morje (usually 'sea' but here in the unattested sense of 'wetland, flooded area') or Old High German muor 'wetland'. In German the village was known as Mauerbach.
