= Kopivnik =

- Location in Slovenia
- Coordinates: 46°27′33.48″N 15°36′32.99″E
- Country: Slovenia
- Traditional region: Styria
- Statistical region: Drava
- Municipality: Rače–Fram

Area
  - Total: 2.42 km^{2} (0.93 sq mi)
- Elevation: 481.5 m (1,580 ft)

Population (2002)
  - Total: 191

Kopivnik (pronounced [kɔˈpiːu̯nik]) is a settlement in the Municipality of Rače–Fram in northeastern Slovenia. It lies on the eastern edge of the Pohorje Hills, above Fram. The area is part of the traditional region of Styria. The municipality is now included in the Drava Statistical Region.
