= Loka pri Framu =

- Location in Slovenia
- Coordinates: 46°26′53.49″N 15°35′59.75″E
- Country: Slovenia
- Traditional region: Styria
- Statistical region: Drava
- Municipality: Rače–Fram

Area
  - Total: 2.97 km^{2} (1.15 sq mi)
- Elevation: 436.8 m (1,433 ft)

Population (2002)
  - Total: 143

Loka pri Framu (pronounced [ˈloːka pɾi ˈfɾaːmu]) is a settlement in the Municipality of Rače–Fram in northeastern Slovenia. It lies in the Pohorje Hills to the west of Fram. The area is part of the traditional region of Styria. The municipality is now included in the Drava Statistical Region.

== Name ==
The name of the settlement was changed from Loka to Loka pri Framu in 1955.
