= Planica, Rače–Fram =

Planica

- Location in Slovenia
- Coordinates: 46°28′9.32″N 15°34′49.8″E
- Country: Slovenia
- Traditional region: Styria
- Statistical region: Drava
- Municipality: Rače–Fram

Area
  - Total: 7.04 km^{2} (2.72 sq mi)
- Elevation: 659.5 m (2,164 ft)

Population (2002)
  - Total: 135

Planica (pronounced [plaˈniːtsa]) is a dispersed settlement in the Pohorje Hills in the Municipality of Rače–Fram in northeastern Slovenia. The area is part of the traditional region of Styria. The municipality is now included in the Drava Statistical Region.

The local church, built on an isolated spot south of the settlement, is dedicated to the Holy Cross and belongs to the Parish of Fram. It was built in 1816 on the site of a 17th-century chapel dedicated to the Holy Spirit.
