= Spodnja Gorica =

- Location in Slovenia
- Coordinates: 46°25′2.13″N 15°41′32.43″E
- Country: Slovenia
- Traditional region: Styria
- Statistical region: Drava
- Municipality: Rače–Fram

Area
  - Total: 4.02 km^{2} (1.55 sq mi)
- Elevation: 253 m (830 ft)

Population (2002)
  - Total: 1,000

Spodnja Gorica (pronounced [ˈspoːdnja ɡɔˈɾiːtsa]) is a settlement in the Municipality of Rače–Fram in northeastern Slovenia. It lies on the flatlands on the right bank of the Drava River south of Rače. The area is part of the traditional region of Styria. The municipality is now included in the Drava Statistical Region.

The village chapel was built in 1924. Traces of Neolithic, Bronze Age and Roman period settlements have been identified at excavations in the area of the village.
