= Zgornja Gorica =

- Location in Slovenia
- Coordinates: 46°25′26.2″N 15°41′15.88″E
- Country: Slovenia
- Traditional region: Styria
- Statistical region: Drava
- Municipality: Rače–Fram

Area
  - Total: 1.26 km^{2} (0.49 sq mi)
- Elevation: 250.8 m (823 ft)

Population (2002)
  - Total: 104

Zgornja Gorica (pronounced [ˈzɡoːɾnja ɡɔˈɾiːtsa]) is a small settlement in the Municipality of Rače–Fram in northeastern Slovenia. It lies on the flatlands on the right bank of the Drava River south of Rače. The area is part of the traditional region of Styria. The municipality is now included in the Drava Statistical Region.

The village chapel dates to the early 20th century.
