= Jan Mlakar =

Slovenian footballer (born 1998)

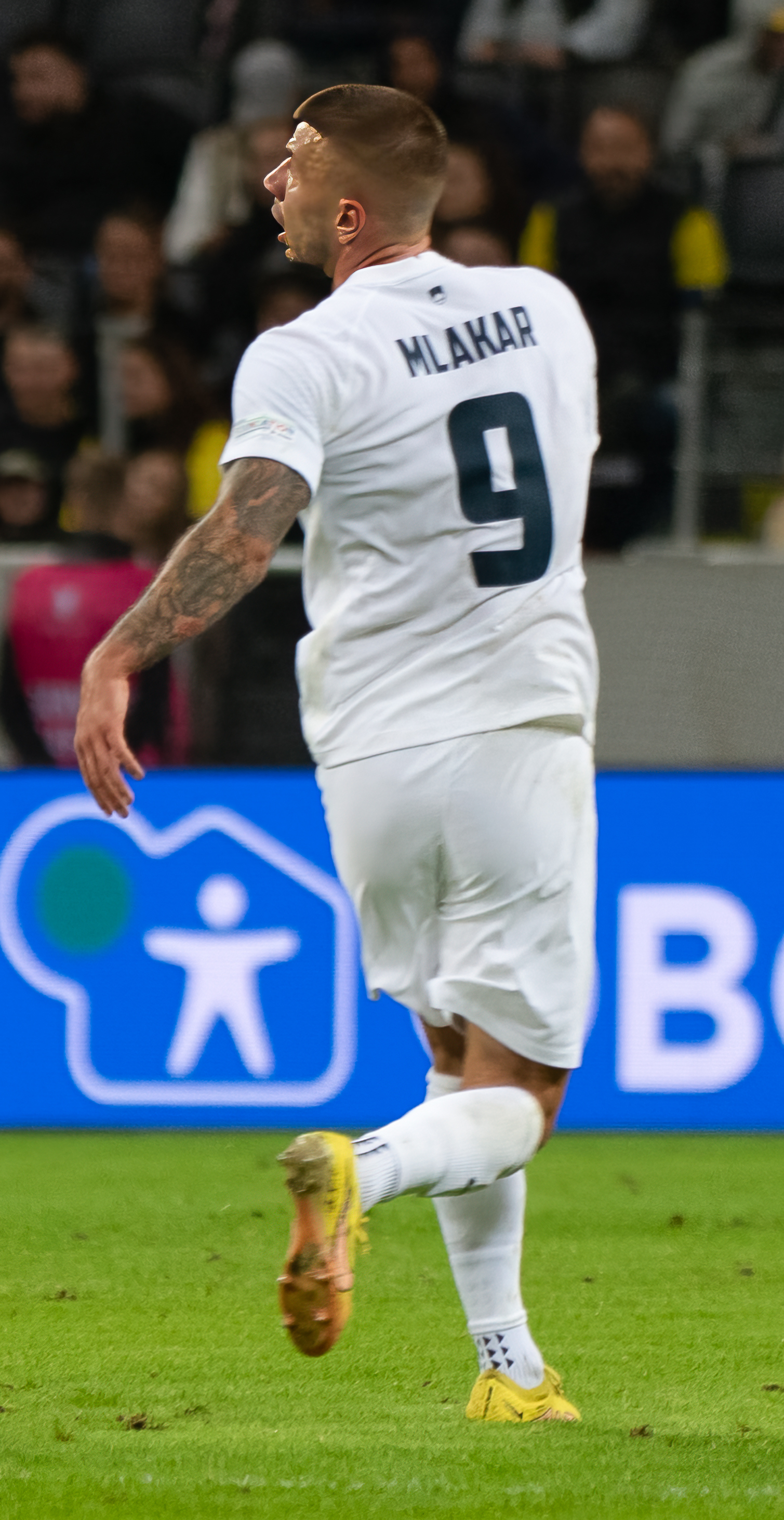
- Mlakar with Slovenia in 2022

Personal information
- Date of birth: 23 October 1998 (age 28)
- Place of birth: Ljubljana, Slovenia
- Height: 1.83 m (6 ft 0 in)
- Positions: Forward; winger

Team information
- Current team: Maribor (on loan from Pisa)
- Number: 17

Youth career
- –2008: Alfa
- 2008–2015: Domžale
- 2015–2017: Fiorentina

Senior career*
Years	Team	Apps	(Gls)
2017–2018	Fiorentina	1	(0)
2017–2018	→ Venezia (loan)	3	(0)
2018–2019	Maribor	28	(12)
2019–2021	Brighton & Hove Albion	0	(0)
2019	→ Maribor (loan)	10	(4)
2019–2020	→ Queens Park Rangers (loan)	6	(0)
2020	→ Wigan Athletic (loan)	1	(0)
2020–2021	→ Maribor (loan)	32	(14)
2021–2023	Hajduk Split	64	(18)
2023–	Pisa	36	(3)
2025	→ Hajduk Split (loan)	6	(1)
2025–2026	→ Amiens (loan)	14	(1)
2026–	→ Maribor (loan)	10	(0)

International career
2014–2015	Slovenia U17 (Note: Official competitive UEFA matches only)	9	(8)
2015–2016	Slovenia U19	5	(2)
2016–2019	Slovenia U21	19	(8)
2019	Slovenia B	1	(0)
2021–2025	Slovenia	29	(4)
- * Club domestic league appearances and goals as of 22 November 2026

Jan Mlakar (born 23 October 1998) is a Slovenian professional footballer who plays as a forward for Slovenian PrvaLiga club Maribor, on loan from Serie B club Pisa.

== Club career ==
=== Early career ===
Born in Ljubljana, Slovenia, Mlakar started playing football at his hometown club Alfa, before moving to Domžale. In early 2015, at the age of 16, Mlakar was transferred to Serie A side Fiorentina for a reported fee of €1 million. He captained Fiorentina's under-19 side and was also the team's top goalscorer in the 2016–17 season. He made his professional senior debut on 30 April 2017 in a league match against Palermo, replacing his fellow countryman Josip Iličić in the 70th minute. For the 2017–18 season, he was loaned to Serie B side Venezia, where he made three league appearances.

In January 2018, Mlakar returned to Slovenia and joined Maribor, signing a four-and-a-half-year contract.

=== Brighton & Hove Albion ===
In January 2019, Mlakar signed a three-and-a-half-year contract with Brighton & Hove Albion. He was immediately loaned back to Maribor until the end of the season. With the team, he won his first senior trophy as Maribor were crowned champions during the 2018–19 season. Overall, Mlakar scored 17 goals for Maribor in 44 appearances over a span of two seasons.

==== Queens Park Rangers (loan) ====
Upon return, he was loaned out again on 24 July 2019 to the Championship side Queens Park Rangers in a one-year deal. Mlakar made his debut for The R's on 13 August 2019 in the first round of the EFL Cup against Bristol City, where he came on as a substitute. The game finished 3–3 with QPR winning 5–4 on penalties. His first start also came in the EFL Cup where he played the full match in the 2–0 home defeat against Portsmouth. He made his league debut coming on as a substitute in a 2–1 away win over Sheffield Wednesday on 31 August 2019.

==== Wigan Athletic (loan) ====
After being recalled by Brighton from QPR in January 2020, he joined another Championship side, Wigan Athletic, on loan until the end of the season. On 4 July 2020, Mlakar made his debut for the Latics, coming on as a substitute away at Brentford in a 3–0 defeat.

==== Maribor (loan) ====
On 14 August 2020, Brighton have sent Mlakar on another loan to the Slovenian PrvaLiga side Maribor until the end of the 2020–21 season. He scored his first goal on his return to Slovenia in his second appearance on 12 September in a 4–1 home victory over Bravo after coming on as a substitute.

=== Hajduk Split ===
On 1 July 2021, Mlakar signed a four-year contract with Croatian club Hajduk Split. On 17 July, he made his debut in a Croatian First League match against Lokomotiva Zagreb. During the match, he scored both Hajduk's goals in an eventual 2–2 draw.

=== Pisa ===
On 27 August 2023, Mlakar returned to Italy with Serie B club Pisa.

==== Hajduk Split (loan) ====
On 28 January 2025, Mlakar returned to Hajduk Split on loan.

==== Amiens (loan) ====
In August 2025, Pisa loaned Mlakar again, this time to Amiens in Ligue 2 until the end of the 2025–26 season.

== International career ==
Mlakar was capped for Slovenia at all youth levels from under-15 to under-21. He was the top goalscorer of the qualifications for the 2015 UEFA European Under-17 Championship, with eight goals. In June 2019, Mlakar was included in the senior squad for the UEFA Euro 2020 qualifying match against Latvia, but was an unused substitution.

As the captain of the under-21 team, he led the player's rebellion against the manager Primož Gliha in October 2020 due to his alleged inappropriate behavior towards players. As a result, Gliha was sacked by the Football Association of Slovenia, and Mlakar was not included in the 2021 UEFA European Under-21 Championship squad by the new manager Milenko Ačimovič.

Mlakar was part of the senior squad for friendly matches away to North Macedonia and at home against Gibraltar in June 2021. He debuted against the former on 1 June, starting the match and playing for 79 minutes in an eventual 1–1 draw. Mlakar also started the game at home against Gibraltar on 4 June, where he scored his first senior international goal, putting his nation 4–0 ahead in an eventual 6–0 victory.

== Career statistics ==
=== Club ===
As of match played 28 May 2023

Appearances and goals by club, season and competition
Club	Season	League			National cup		League cup		Continental		Other		Total	
Club	Season	Division	Apps	Goals	Apps	Goals	Apps	Goals	Apps	Goals	Apps	Goals	Apps	Goals
Fiorentina	2016–17	Serie A	1	0	0	0	—		0	0	—		1	0
Venezia (loan)	2017–18	Serie B	3	0	1	0	—		—		—		4	0
Maribor	2017–18	Slovenian PrvaLiga	12	3	—		—		—		—		12	3
Maribor	2018–19	Slovenian PrvaLiga	26	13	3	1	—		3 (Note: Appearances in UEFA Europa League)	0	—		32	14
Maribor	Total		38	16	3	1	0	0	3	0	0	0	44	17
Brighton & Hove Albion	2019–20	Premier League	0	0	0	0	0	0	—		—		0	0
Queens Park Rangers (loan)	2019–20	Championship	6	0	0	0	2	0	—		—		8	0
Wigan Athletic (loan)	2019–20	Championship	1	0	0	0	0	0	—		—		1	0
Maribor (loan)	2020–21	Slovenian PrvaLiga	32	14	2	1	—		1	0	—		35	15
Hajduk Split	2021–22	Croatian First League	27	7	4	0	—		2 (Note: Appearances in UEFA Europa Conference League)	0	—		33	7
Hajduk Split	2022–23	Croatian League	33	11	5	3	—		2	0	1 (Note: Appearance in Croatian Super Cup)	0	41	14
Hajduk Split	Total		60	18	9	3	0	0	4	0	1	0	74	21
Career total			141	48	15	5	2	0	8	0	1	0	167	53

=== International ===
Appearances and goals by national team and year
National team	Year	Apps	Goals
Slovenia	2021	5	1
Slovenia	2022	1	0
Slovenia	2023	8	1
Slovenia	2024	12	2
Slovenia	2025	3	0
Total		29	4

Scores and results list Slovenia's goal tally first, score column indicates score after each Mlakar goal.

List of international goals scored by Jan Mlakar
No.	Date	Venue	Cap	Opponent	Score	Result	Competition
1	4 June 2021	Bonifika Stadium, Koper, Slovenia	2	Gibraltar	4–0	6–0	Friendly
2	10 September 2023	San Marino Stadium, Serravalle, San Marino	10	San Marino	2–0	4–0	UEFA Euro 2024 qualifying
3	4 June 2024	Stožice Stadium, Ljubljana, Slovenia	16	Armenia	1–0	2–1	Friendly
4	13 October 2024	Almaty Central Stadium, Almaty, Kazakhstan	24	Kazakhstan	1–0	1–0	2024–25 UEFA Nations League B

== Honours ==
Maribor

- Slovenian PrvaLiga: 2018–19
- Slovenian Cup runner-up: 2018–19

Hajduk Split

- Croatian Cup: 2021–22, 2022–23
- Croatian Super Cup runner-up: 2022, 2023

Individual

- Slovenian PrvaLiga top scorer: 2020–21
