= Požeg =

- Location in Slovenia
- Coordinates: 46°26′4.82″N 15°38′21.67″E
- Country: Slovenia
- Traditional region: Styria
- Statistical region: Drava
- Municipality: Rače–Fram

Area
  - Total: 1.22 km^{2} (0.47 sq mi)
- Elevation: 274.3 m (900 ft)

Population (2002)
  - Total: 70

Požeg (pronounced [pɔˈʒɛk] or [ˈpɔːʒɛk]) is a small settlement in the Municipality of Rače–Fram in northeastern Slovenia. The area is part of the traditional region of Styria. The municipality is now included in the Drava Statistical Region. The Ljubljana to Maribor motorway runs through settlement.
