= Brezula =

- Location in Slovenia
- Coordinates: 46°26′31.13″N 15°41′44.81″E
- Country: Slovenia
- Traditional region: Styria
- Statistical region: Drava
- Municipality: Rače–Fram

Area
  - Total: 3.78 km^{2} (1.46 sq mi)
- Elevation: 13.14 m (43.1 ft)

Population (2002)
  - Total: 256

Brezula (pronounced [ˈbɾeːzula]) is a settlement in the Municipality of Rače–Fram in northeastern Slovenia. It lies on the flatlands on the right bank of the river Drava to the south of Maribor. The area is part of the traditional region of Styria. The municipality is now included in the Drava Statistical Region.

The village chapel was built in the last quarter of the 19th century.
