= Ranče =

- Location in Slovenia
- Coordinates: 46°28′6.55″N 15°36′27.27″E
- Country: Slovenia
- Traditional region: Styria
- Statistical region: Drava
- Municipality: Rače–Fram

Area
  - Total: 3.06 km^{2} (1.18 sq mi)
- Elevation: 524.8 m (1,722 ft)

Population (2002)
  - Total: 182

Ranče (pronounced [ˈɾaːntʃɛ]) is a settlement in the eastern Pohorje Hills in the Municipality of Rače–Fram in northeastern Slovenia. The area is part of the traditional region of Styria and is now included in the Drava Statistical Region.

== History ==
In February 2013, part of the settlement of Ranče was declared autonomous as the settlement of Šestdobe.
