= Martin Milec =

Slovenian footballer

Personal information
- Date of birth: 20 September 1991 (age 35)
- Place of birth: Maribor, Slovenia
- Height: 1.74 m (5 ft 9 in)
- Position: Right-back

Team information
- Current team: Rače

Youth career
- Rače
- Aluminij

Senior career*
Years	Team	Apps	(Gls)
2008–2010	Aluminij	37	(15)
2010–2014	Maribor	81	(9)
2014–2017	Standard Liège	39	(1)
2016–2017	→ Roda JC Kerkrade (loan)	37	(0)
2017–2025	Maribor	138	(5)
2025–	Rače	0	(0)

International career
2006–2007	Slovenia U16	6	(0)
2007–2008	Slovenia U17	8	(1)
2008	Slovenia U18	5	(2)
2008–2009	Slovenia U19	13	(1)
2010	Slovenia U20	1	(0)
2009–2011	Slovenia U21	7	(0)
2013–2022	Slovenia	8	(0)
- * Club domestic league appearances and goals as of 12 June 2025

Martin Milec (born 20 September 1991) is a Slovenian footballer who plays for Rače. Although primarily a right-back, he can also play as a midfielder.

== Club career ==
Milec began his career at the age of six at local club Rače, and then joined Aluminij after a few months. He made his senior debut for Aluminij at the age of 17.

In July 2010, he signed a four-year contract with Slovenian PrvaLiga club Maribor. In the 2013–14 PrvaLiga season, he was chosen as the best young footballer of the league.

In June 2014, after four years with Maribor, Milec signed for Belgian top division side Standard Liège.

On 6 August 2017, Milec returned to Maribor on a three-year contract.

== International career ==
Throughout his career, Milec was a member of the Slovenia youth selections and represented the under-19 team at the 2009 UEFA Under-19 Championship. He also played for the under-21 team.

Between 2013 and 2022, Milec was capped eight times for the Slovenia senior team, scoring no goals in the process.

== Personal life ==
A native of Podova, Milec is a lifelong fan of NK Maribor, a club he played for, and regularly attended Maribor's matches as a child.
