= Šestdobe =

- Location in Slovenia
- Coordinates: 46°28′38″N 15°36′17″E
- Country: Slovenia
- Traditional region: Styria
- Statistical region: Drava
- Municipality: Rače–Fram
- Elevation: 524.8 m (1,722 ft)

Šestdobe (pronounced [ʃɛsˈdoːbɛ]) is a village in the Municipality of Rače–Fram in northeastern Slovenia.

== History ==
In the past, Šestdobe was part of the settlement of Ranče. It was established as an autonomous settlement in February 2013.
