= Podova =

- Location in Slovenia
- Coordinates: 46°26′4.18″N 15°41′55.24″E
- Country: Slovenia
- Traditional region: Styria
- Statistical region: Drava
- Municipality: Rače–Fram

Area
  - Total: 3.9 km^{2} (1.5 sq mi)
- Elevation: 252.5 m (828 ft)

Population (2002)
  - Total: 306

Podova (pronounced [ˈpoːdɔʋa]) is a settlement in the Municipality of Rače–Fram in northeastern Slovenia. It lies on the flatlands on the right bank of the Drava River southeast of Rače. The area is part of the traditional region of Styria. The municipality is now included in the Drava Statistical Region.

A small chapel in the village square dates to the late 18th century.
