= Ješenca =

- Location in Slovenia
- Coordinates: 46°26′31.74″N 15°39′5.52″E
- Country: Slovenia
- Traditional region: Styria
- Statistical region: Drava
- Municipality: Rače–Fram

Area
  - Total: 4.2 km^{2} (1.6 sq mi)
- Elevation: 276.5 m (907 ft)

Population (2002)
  - Total: 421

Ješenca (pronounced [jɛˈʃeːntsa]) is a settlement in the Municipality of Rače–Fram in northeastern Slovenia. The area is part of the traditional region of Styria. The municipality is now included in the Drava Statistical Region.
