= Municipality of Rače-Fram =

Municipality of Slovenia

Municipality of Rače–Fram Občina Rače - Fram
- Municipality
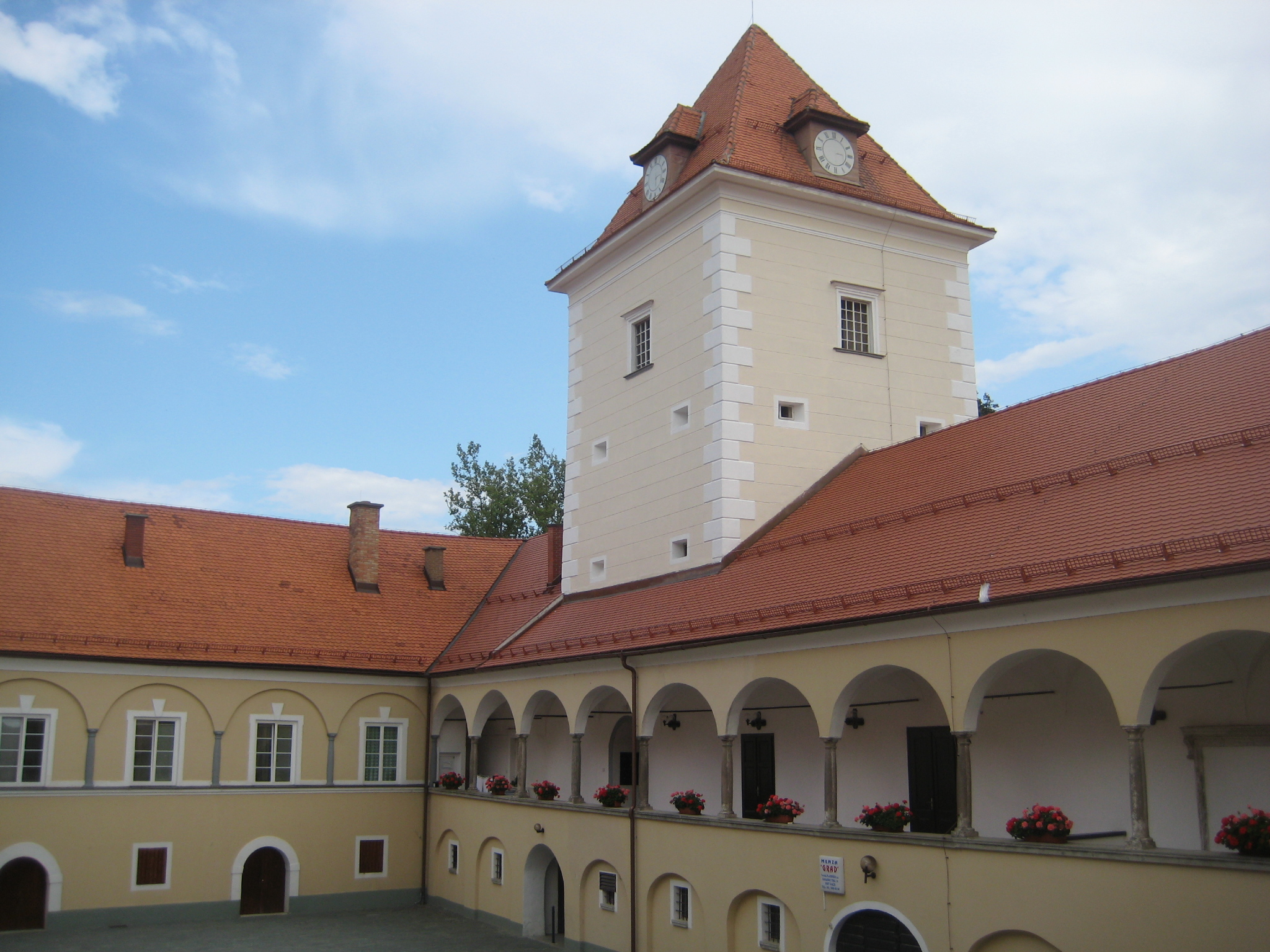
- Rače Castle

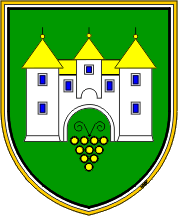
- Coat of arms

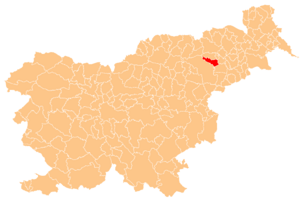
- Location of the Municipality of Rače–Fram in Slovenia
- Coordinates: 46°27′N 15°39′E
- Country: Slovenia

Government
  - Mayor: Samo Rajšp (Independent)

Area
  - Total: 51.2 km^{2} (19.8 sq mi)

Population (2025)
  - Total: 8,167
  - Density: 160/km^{2} (413/sq mi)
- Time zone: UTC+01 (CET)
  - Summer (DST): UTC+02 (CEST)
- Website: www.race-fram.si

The Municipality of Rače–Fram (pronounced [ˈɾaːtʃɛ ˈfɾaːm]; Slovene: Občina Rače - Fram) is a municipality south of Maribor in northeastern Slovenia. Its administrative seat is the settlement of Rače. The area is part of the traditional region of Styria. It is now included in the Drava Statistical Region. The municipality covers an area of 52 square kilometres (20 sq mi) and extends from the plain on the right bank of the Drava River into the Pohorje Hills. The Ljubljana–Maribor motorway and railway line run through the municipality.

== Settlements ==
In addition to the municipal seat of Rače, the municipality also includes the following settlements:

- Brezula
- Fram
- Ješenca
- Kopivnik
- Loka pri Framu
- Morje
- Planica
- Podova
- Požeg
- Ranče
- Šestdobe
- Spodnja Gorica
- Zgornja Gorica
