= David Kovačič =

Slovenian footballer

Personal information
- Date of birth: 27 January 1999 (age 27)
- Place of birth: Krško, Slovenia
- Height: 1.83 m (6 ft 0 in)
- Position: Midfielder

Team information
- Current team: ETSU Buccaneers
- Number: 6

Youth career
- Krško

College career
Years	Team	Apps	(Gls)
2019–2021	Maryland Terrapins	25	(3)
2022–	ETSU Buccaneers	14	(7)

Senior career*
Years	Team	Apps	(Gls)
2016–2018	Krško	61	(1)

International career
2014	Slovenia U16	4	(0)
2015	Slovenia U17	6	(0)
2017	Slovenia U18	5	(0)
2017	Slovenia U21	1	(0)
- * Club domestic league appearances and goals

David Kovačič (born 27 January 1999) is a Slovenian footballer who plays as a midfielder for East Tennessee State Buccaneers.

== Career ==
Kovačič started his career with Slovenian top flight side Krško, where he made 67 appearances and scored 1 goal. On 25 October 2016, Kovačič debuted for Krško during a 1-2 loss to Domžale. On 19 September 2017, he scored his first goal for Krško during a 2-3 loss to Maribor. In 2019, Kovačič joined the Maryland Terrapins in the United States.
