= Jean-Claude Billong =

Cameroonian footballer (born 1993)

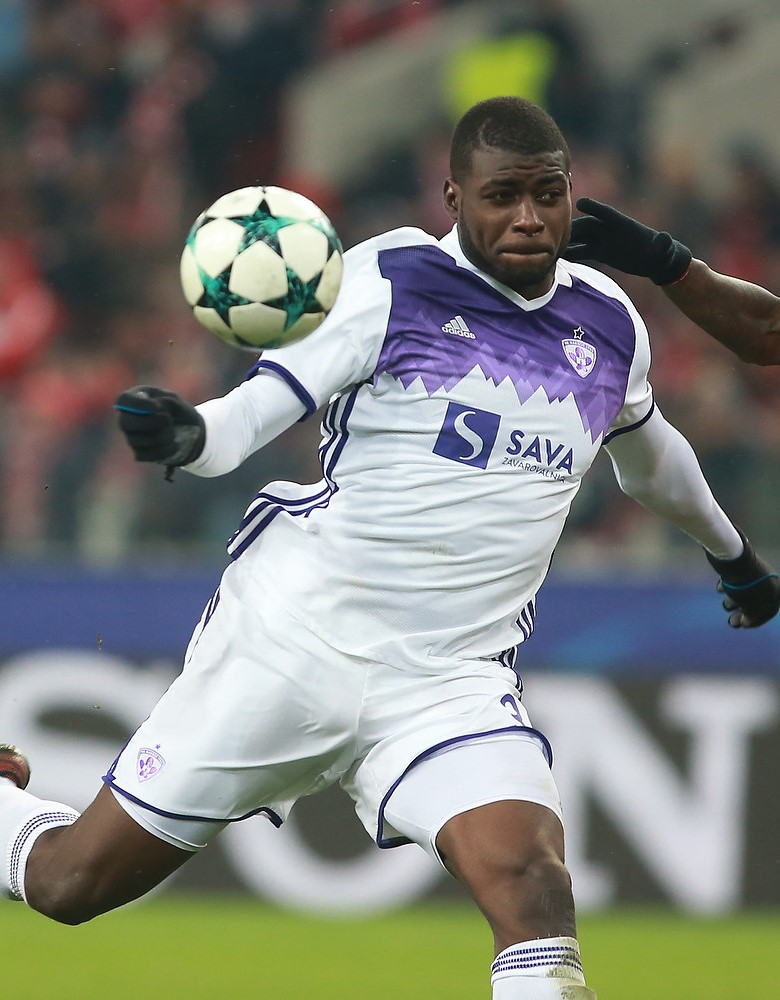
- Billong with Maribor

Personal information
- Full name: Jean-Claude Billong
- Date of birth: 28 December 1993 (age 32)
- Place of birth: Mantes-la-Jolie, France
- Height: 2.03 m (6 ft 8 in)
- Position: Centre back

Youth career
- –2010: Créteil
- 2010–2013: Mantois 78
- 2014: New York Red Bulls

Senior career*
Years	Team	Apps	(Gls)
2015	Pacy Ménilles	10	(0)
2016	Leixões	0	(0)
2016–2017	Rudar Velenje	24	(2)
2017	Maribor	14	(1)
2018–2021	Benevento	18	(0)
2019	→ Foggia (loan)	15	(0)
2019–2020	→ Salernitana (loan)	11	(0)
2020–2021	→ Hatayspor (loan)	26	(0)
2021–2022	Clermont	7	(0)
2022–2023	CFR Cluj	0	(0)
2023–2024	Muangthong United	23	(1)
2024–2025	Lecco	6	(0)
Total		154	(4)

International career^{‡}
2021	Cameroon	3	(0)
- * Club domestic league appearances and goals as of 01:11, 19 January 2026 (UTC) ‡ National team caps and goals as of 14 November 2021

Jean-Claude Billong (born 28 December 1993) is a retired professional footballer who plays as a centre-back. Born in France, he plays for the Cameroon national team.

== Club career ==
Born in Paris, Billong played for youth selections of US Créteil-Lusitanos, and later moved to Mantes. In 2014, Billong moved abroad and signed for the reserve team of the New York Red Bulls. In July 2015, he signed for the Portuguese team Leixões.

In July 2016, he signed a one-year deal with Slovenian team Rudar Velenje. He made 24 appearances in the Slovenian PrvaLiga during the 2016–17 season, scoring two goals. In June 2017, he moved to Slovenian champions Maribor, signing a three-year contract. He made his debut for Maribor on 15 July 2017, in a match against Aluminij, where he played the entire match.

In December 2017, Billong signed for the Serie A team Benevento for an undisclosed transfer fee, believed to be around €2 million.

On 31 January 2019, he joined Serie B club Foggia on loan.

On 15 July 2019, he signed a four-year contract with Serie B club Salernitana.

On 17 August 2021, he moved to Clermont, France, on a two-year contract.

On 9 October 2024, Billong joined Italian Serie C club Lecco on a contract until 30 June 2025. The contract was mutually terminated on 2 January 2025.

== International career ==
Born in France, Billong is Cameroonian by descent. He debuted with the senior Cameroon national team in a 1–0 friendly win over Nigeria on 4 June 2021.

=== International stats ===
As of 13 November 2021

National team	Year	Apps	Goals
Cameroon	2021	3	0
Total		3	0
