= Rače =

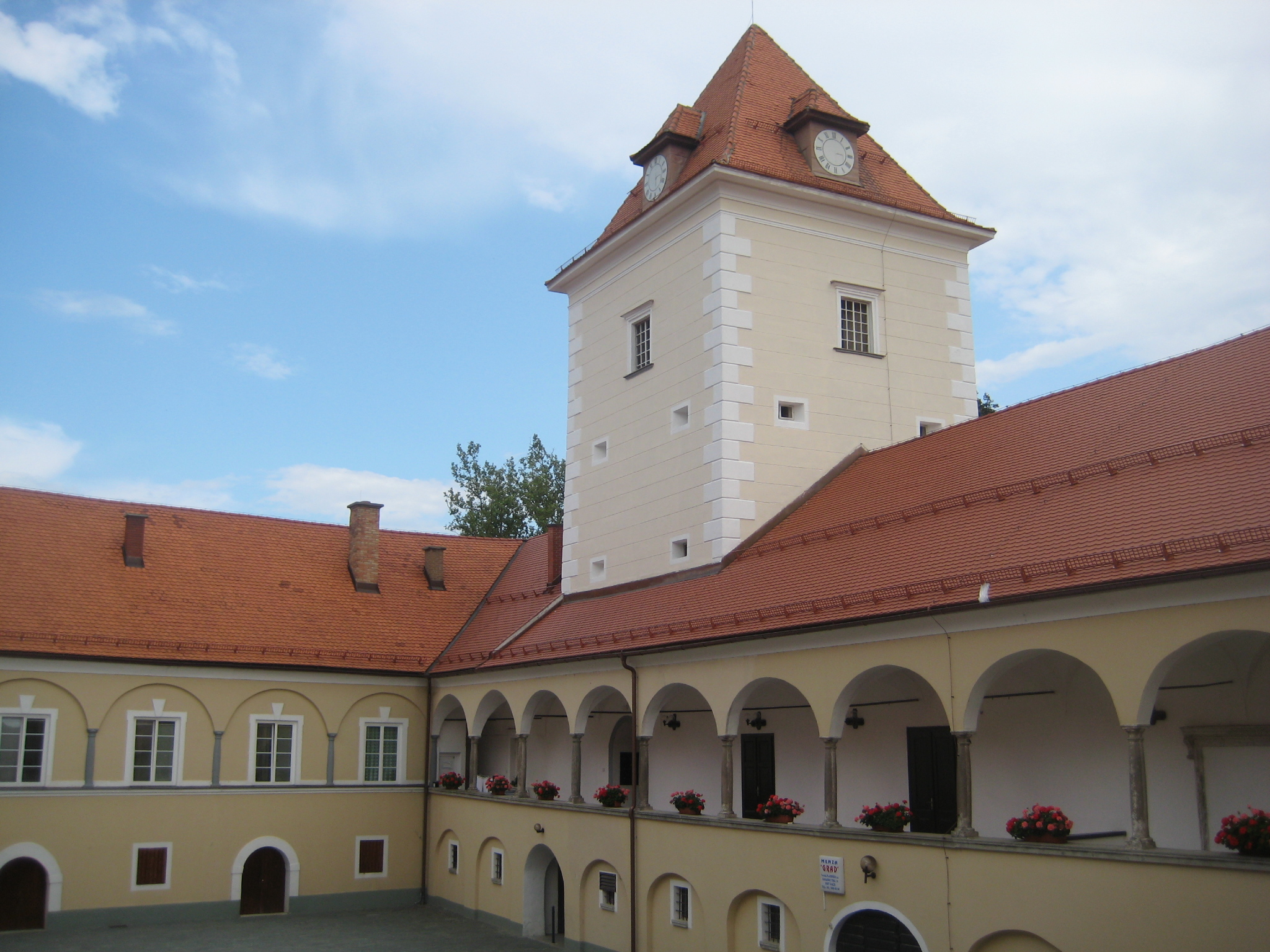
- Rače Castle

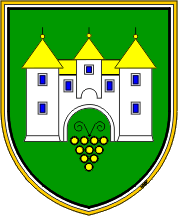
- Coat of arms

- Location in Slovenia
- Coordinates: 46°27′10.31″N 15°40′52.35″E
- Country: Slovenia
- Traditional region: Styria
- Statistical region: Drava
- Municipality: Rače-Fram

Area
  - Total: 8.48 km^{2} (3.27 sq mi)
- Elevation: 260.4 m (854 ft)

Population (2017)
  - Total: 2,693

Rače (pronounced [ˈɾaːtʃɛ], in older sources also Račje, German: Kranichsfeld) is a settlement in and the administrative centre of the Municipality of Rače–Fram in northeastern Slovenia. It lies under the eastern Pohorje Hills on the edge of the plain on the right bank of the Drava River south of Maribor. The area is part of the traditional region of Styria. The municipality is now included in the Drava Statistical Region.

Rače Castle is a 16th-century castle west of the settlement. It was built between 1528 and 1533 and was originally surrounded by a moat. In the 17th century two round towers and a chapel dedicated to Saint John of Nepomuk were added to the building. A square tower on the opposite side of the building dates to 1915.
