= Fram, Rače–Fram =

Fram Frauheim
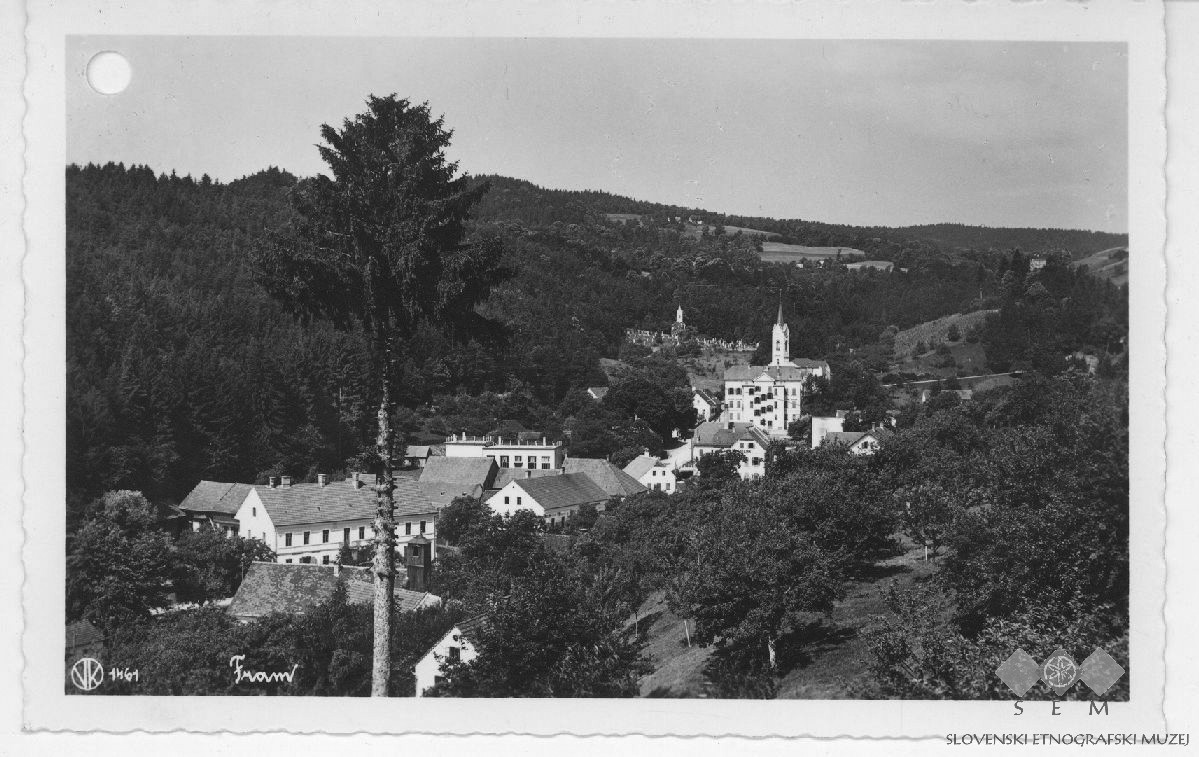
- Postcard of Fram

- Location in Slovenia
- Coordinates: 46°27′22.72″N 15°37′45.98″E
- Country: Slovenia
- Traditional region: Styria
- Statistical region: Drava
- Municipality: Rače–Fram

Area
  - Total: 5.47 km^{2} (2.11 sq mi)
- Elevation: 321 m (1,053 ft)

Population (2002)
  - Total: 791

Fram (pronounced [ˈfɾaːm]) is a village in the Municipality of Rače–Fram in northeastern Slovenia. It lies in the eastern foothills of the Pohorje range south of Maribor. The area is part of the traditional region of Styria. The municipality is now included in the Drava Statistical Region.

== Name ==
The village was first attested in written sources in 1335 as Vraunhaym (and as Frawnhain in 1397, Fraunhain in 1402, and Frauenhaim in 1461). The Slovene name is a contraction of *Fraham, derived from Frauenheim, the name of the noble family that owned the castle there.

== Mass grave ==
Fram is the site of a mass grave associated with the Second World War. The Fram Mass Grave (Slovene: Grobišče Fram) is located in a wooded hilly area about 600 meters (2,000 ft) northwest of the village. The grave contains the remains of a small group of local civilians.

== Church ==
The parish church in the settlement is dedicated to Saint Anne and belongs to the Roman Catholic Archdiocese of Maribor. It was built in 1875 in a Neo-Romanesque style on the site of a chapel belonging to a 13th-century castle that stood to the west of the settlement. The castle was destroyed in a fire in the late 18th century and only ruins are visible today.
