= 2015–16 Slovenian Second League =

Slovenian Second League
- Season: 2015–16
- Champions: Radomlje
- Promoted: Radomlje; Aluminij
- Relegated: Šenčur; Tolmin
- Matches: 135
- Goals: 415 (3.07 per match)
- Top goalscorer: Lovro Bizjak; Dejan Sokanović (14 goals each)
- Biggest home win: Aluminij 8–0 Šenčur; Aluminij 8–0 Drava
- Biggest away win: Zarica 0–5 Aluminij
- Highest scoring: Drava 6–4 Šenčur
- Longest winning run: 4 matches Radomlje; Triglav; Drava
- Longest unbeaten run: 14 matches Aluminij
- Longest winless run: 12 matches Zarica
- Longest losing run: 6 matches Dob
- Highest attendance: 800; Triglav 1–1 Zarica
- Lowest attendance: 30; Ankaran 2–2 Drava
- Total attendance: 28,312
- Average attendance: 209

The 2015–16 Slovenian Second League season was the 25th edition of the Slovenian Second League. The season began on 9 August 2015 and ended on 22 May 2016.

== Competition format ==
Each team played a total of 27 matches. Teams played 3 matches against each other.

== Teams ==
Location of teams in the 2015–16 Slovenian Second League
- Krško was promoted to the Slovenian PrvaLiga after the 2014–15 season
- Radomlje was relegated from the Slovenian PrvaLiga after the 2014–15 season
- Drava and Zarica were promoted from the Slovenian Third League after the 2014–15 season
- Dravinja and Šmartno were relegated to the Slovenian Third League after the 2014–15 season.

=== Stadiums and locations ===
Team	Location	Stadium
Aluminij	Kidričevo	Aluminij Sports Park
Ankaran Hrvatini	Ankaran	ŠRC Katarina
Dob	Dob	Dob Sports Park
Drava Ptuj	Ptuj	Ptuj City Stadium
Radomlje	Radomlje	Radomlje Sports Park
Šenčur	Šenčur	Šenčur Sports Park
Tolmin	Tolmin	Brajda Sports Park
Triglav	Kranj	Stanko Mlakar Stadium
Veržej	Veržej	Čistina Stadium
Zarica	Kranj	Zarica Sports Park

== League table ==
=== Standings ===
Pos	Team	Pld	W	D	L	GF	GA	GD	Pts	Promotion, qualification or relegation
1	Radomlje (C, P)	27	16	7	4	51	24	+27	55	Promoted to Slovenian PrvaLiga
2	Aluminij (P)	27	14	8	5	61	29	+32	50	Qualification to promotion play-offs
3	Drava Ptuj	27	13	7	7	43	42	+1	46	
4	Triglav	27	12	8	7	43	25	+18	44	
5	Dob	27	9	5	13	42	44	−2	32	
6	Veržej	27	8	8	11	41	54	−13	32	
7	Zarica	27	8	7	12	27	46	−19	31	
8	Ankaran Hrvatini	27	8	7	12	33	45	−12	31	
9	Tolmin (R)	27	6	8	13	36	43	−7	26	Relegated to 3. SNL – West
10	Šenčur (R)	27	5	7	15	38	63	−25	22	Relegated to 3. SNL – Centre

Source: NZS (in Slovene)
Rules for classification: 1) points; 2) points in head-to-head matches; 3) goal difference in head-to-head matches; 4) goals scored in head-to-head matches; 5) total goal difference; 6) total goals scored
(C) Champions; (P) Promoted; (R) Relegated

=== Positions by round ===
Team ╲ Round	1	2	3	4	5	6	7	8	9	10	11	12	13	14	15	16	17	18	19	20	21	22	23	24	25	26	27
Radomlje	3	3	3	2	1	1	1	2	2	4	1	1	1	1	1	1	1	1	1	1	1	1	1	1	1	1	1
Aluminij	2	5	4	6	5	5	4	1	5	1	5	7	7	6	5	5	4	6	4	3	4	4	3	2	2	2	2
Drava Ptuj	7	2	2	1	2	2	5	3	1	2	2	2	2	2	2	2	2	2	3	2	2	2	2	3	4	3	3
Triglav Kranj	6	9	9	8	8	6	6	5	6	3	7	5	4	5	6	6	5	3	2	4	3	3	4	4	3	4	4
Dob	9	6	5	3	4	4	3	7	3	5	3	3	5	3	3	4	6	5	6	5	5	5	5	5	5	5	5
Veržej	4	1	6	7	7	8	7	6	7	7	8	4	3	4	4	3	3	4	5	6	6	6	6	6	6	6	6
Zarica Kranj	5	8	8	5	6	7	8	8	4	10	6	8	8	8	8	8	9	8	9	9	8	8	8	7	7	7	7
Ankaran Hrvatini	1	4	1	4	3	3	2	4	8	9	4	6	6	7	7	7	7	7	7	7	7	7	7	8	9	8	8
Tolmin	10	10	10	10	10	10	10	10	10	6	9	9	10	9	9	9	8	9	8	8	9	9	9	9	8	9	9
Šenčur	8	7	7	9	9	9	9	9	9	8	10	10	9	10	10	10	10	10	10	10	10	10	10	10	10	10	10

Leader / Promotion to 1.SNL
Qualification to promotion play-offs
Relegation to 3.SNL

Round 16 was the final round before the winter break

=== Results ===
==== First and second round ====
Home \ Away	ALU	ANK	DOB	DRA	RAD	ŠEN	TOL	TRI	VER	ZAR
Aluminij		0–0	2–1	0–2	0–4	2–1	1–0	2–2	2–2	5–1
Ankaran Hrvatini	0–0		2–1	2–2	0–2	4–2	0–3	1–0	1–2	1–3
Dob	1–2	1–2		2–1	1–1	1–2	2–0	2–0	2–2	3–2
Drava Ptuj	1–1	3–0	2–1		2–1	1–0	2–1	0–3	2–4	0–0
Radomlje	6–1	3–0	2–1	0–0		1–1	2–2	0–2	1–0	1–0
Šenčur	0–2	3–3	0–2	1–1	0–1		2–2	1–4	2–3	5–0
Tolmin	2–1	0–2	2–3	2–2	0–2	5–1		2–2	1–2	2–0
Triglav Kranj	1–0	0–0	0–2	0–1	2–0	4–1	2–2		1–1	1–1
Veržej	3–3	3–0	0–2	1–2	2–2	1–1	4–1	1–2		0–1
Zarica Kranj	0–5	1–1	2–2	3–1	0–2	0–0	1–0	2–2	0–1	

Source: NZS
Legend: Blue = home team win; Yellow = draw; Red = away team win.

==== Third round ====
Home \ Away	ALU	ANK	DOB	DRA	RAD	ŠEN	TOL	TRI	VER	ZAR
Aluminij		1–0	0–0	8–0		8–0	2–0			
Ankaran Hrvatini			3–1		1–3			1–0		0–1
Dob					2–3	3–1		1–3	0–0	1–4
Drava Ptuj		3–2	3–2			6–4	0–0	0–1		
Radomlje	1–1			3–1		4–1			2–3	0–0
Šenčur		2–2					2–0		3–2	2–0
Tolmin		3–1	3–2		1–2			0–0		
Triglav Kranj	0–2				0–2	1–0			7–0	3–0
Veržej	1–5	2–4		0–3			1–1			
Zarica Kranj	0–5			0–2			2–1		3–0	

Source: NZS
Legend: Blue = home team win; Yellow = draw; Red = away team win.

== Season statistics ==
=== Top goalscorers ===
Rank	Player	Team	Goals
1	(Slovenia) Lovro Bizjak	Aluminij	14
1	(Croatia) Dejan Sokanović	Tolmin	14
3	(Slovenia) Žiga Škoflek	Aluminij	11
4	(Slovenia) Sebastjan Petek	Veržej	10
4	(Serbia) Dušan Stoiljković	Radomlje	10
6	(Slovenia) Samo Kokalj	Šenčur	9
6	(Slovenia) Blaž Šujica	Zarica	9
6	(Slovenia) Arpad Vaš	Veržej	9
9	(Slovenia) Nastja Čeh	Drava Ptuj	8
9	(Slovenia) Igor Barukčič	Radomlje	8
9	(Slovenia) Liridon Osmanaj	Radomlje	8

Source: NZS

=== Attendances ===
Pos	Team	Total	High	Low	Average	Change
1	Drava Ptuj	4,750	700	150	339	+213.9%^{^{2,4}}
2	Triglav Kranj	4,030	800	100	288	+41.2%^{^{4}}
3	Radomlje	3,450	500	150	246	−61.3%^{^{1,4}}
4	Tolmin	3,097	350	150	238	−26.1%^{^{3}}
5	Veržej	2,550	300	100	196	+13.3%^{^{3}}
6	Aluminij	2,440	700	80	174	+54.0%^{^{4}}
7	Dob	2,330	600	80	166	+22.1%^{^{4}}
8	Zarica Kranj	2,280	750	50	175	+44.6%^{^{2,3}}
8	Šenčur	2,280	350	80	175	+15.9%^{^{3}}
10	Ankaran Hrvatini	1,105	110	30	85	−14.1%^{^{3}}
	League total	28,312	800	30	209	+14.2%

Updated to games played on 24 May 2016
Source: Slovenian NZS - 2.SNL website (in Slovene)

Note ^{1}:Team played in the Slovenian PrvaLiga the previous season.
Note ^{2}:Team played in the Slovenian Third League the previous season.
Note ^{3}:Team has played 13 home matches.
Note ^{4}:Team has played 14 home matches.

== See also ==
- 2015 Slovenian Supercup
- 2015–16 Slovenian Cup
- 2015–16 Slovenian PrvaLiga
- 2015–16 Slovenian Third League
