= Gregor Sikošek =

Slovenian footballer (born 1994)

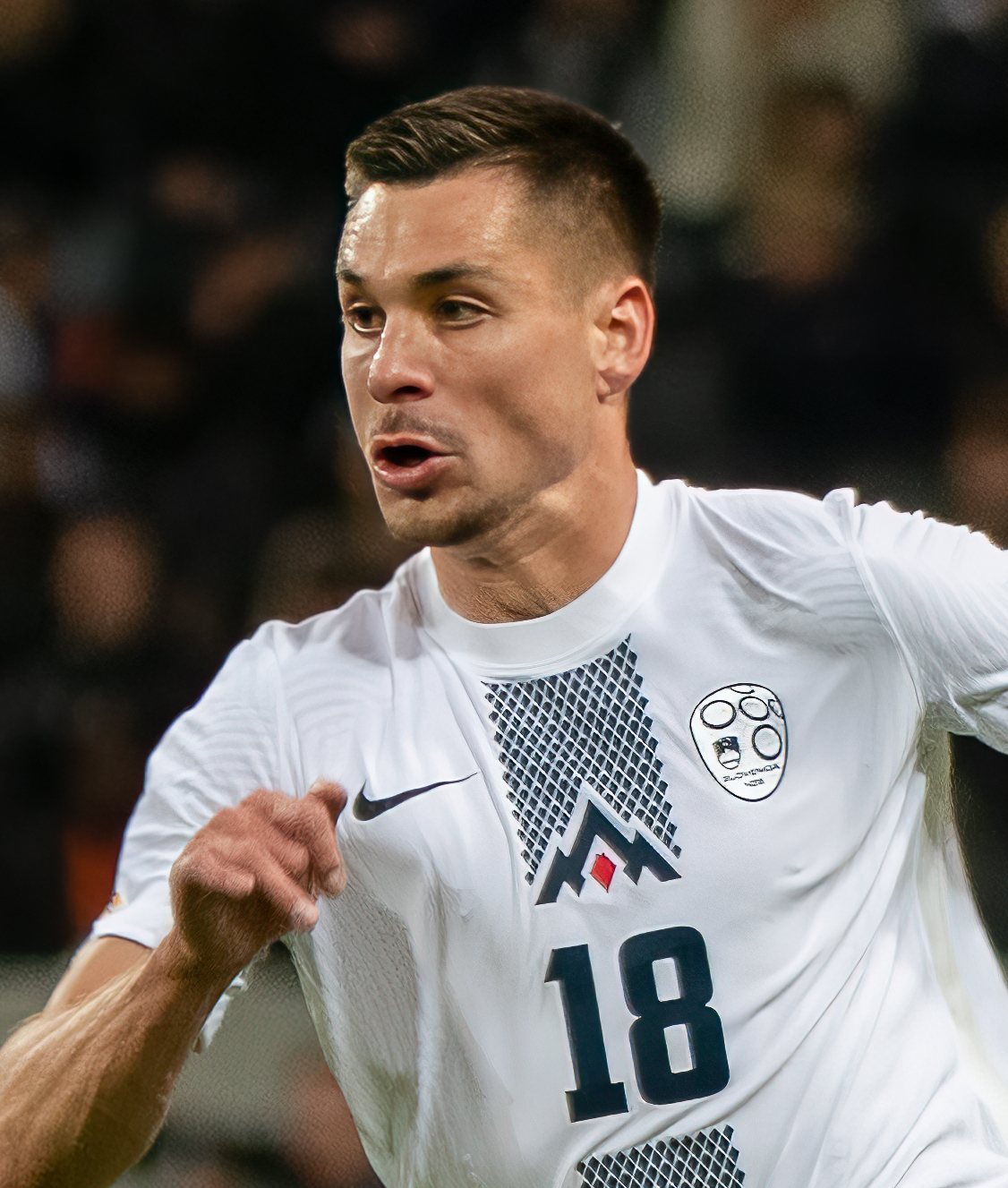
- Sikošek with Slovenia in 2022

Personal information
- Date of birth: 13 February 1994 (age 32)
- Place of birth: Brežice, Slovenia
- Height: 1.76 m (5 ft 9 in)
- Position: Left-back

Team information
- Current team: Varaždin
- Number: 20

Youth career
- 1999–2010: Brežice
- 2011–2013: Krško

Senior career*
Years	Team	Apps	(Gls)
2012–2016	Krško	83	(2)
2016–2017	Koper	18	(0)
2017–2019	Brøndby	11	(0)
2017–2018	→ Silkeborg (loan)	16	(0)
2018–2019	→ Domžale (loan)	41	(1)
2020–2021	Domžale	35	(2)
2021–2026	Maribor	73	(3)
2025	→ Gorica (loan)	16	(0)
2026–	Varaždin	11	(0)

International career
2016–2022	Slovenia	11	(0)
2017–2019	Slovenia B	3	(0)
- * Club domestic league appearances and goals as of 27 May 2026

Gregor Sikošek (born 13 February 1994) is a Slovenian footballer who plays as a defender for Croatian Football League club Varaždin.

== International career ==
In November 2016, Sikošek received his first call-up to the senior Slovenia squad for the matches against Malta and Poland. He made his debut against the latter on 14 November 2016.

== Career statistics ==
=== Club ===
As of 9 August 2017

Appearances and goals by club, season and competition
Club	Season	Division	League		National cup		Continental		Total	
Club	Season	Division	Apps	Goals	Apps	Goals	Apps	Goals	Apps	Goals
Krško	2011–12	Slovenian Second League	3	1	0	0	—		3	1
Krško	2012–13	Slovenian Second League	1	0	0	0	—		1	0
Krško	2013–14	Slovenian Second League	22	0	0	0	—		22	0
Krško	2014–15	Slovenian Second League	24	1	0	0	—		24	1
Krško	2015–16	Slovenian PrvaLiga	33	0	0	0	—		33	0
Total			83	2	0	0	0	0	83	2
Koper	2016–17	Slovenian PrvaLiga	18	0	1	0	—		19	0
Total			18	0	1	0	0	0	19	0
Brøndby	2016–17	Danish Superliga	10	0	3	0	—		13	0
Brøndby	2017–18	Danish Superliga	1	0	0	0	2	0	3	0
Total			11	0	3	0	2	0	16	0
Career total			112	2	4	0	2	0	118	2

=== International ===
Appearances and goals by national team and year
National team	Year	Apps	Goals
Slovenia	2016	1	0
Slovenia	2022	10	0
Total		11	0
