= 2010–11 Slovenian Second League =

Slovenian Second League
- Season: 2010–11
- Champions: Aluminij
- Promoted: Mura 05
- Relegated: Drava Ptuj
- Matches: 135
- Goals: 376 (2.79 per match)
- Top goalscorer: Ladislav Stanko (16 goals)

The 2010–11 Slovenian Second League season began on 8 August 2010 and ended on 29 May 2011. Each team played a total of 27 matches.

== Clubs ==
Location of teams

Club	Location	Stadium
Aluminij	Kidričevo	Aluminij Sports Park
Bela Krajina	Črnomelj	ŠRC Loka
Dob	Dob	Dob Sports Park
Drava Ptuj	Ptuj	Ptuj City Stadium
Dravinja	Slovenske Konjice	Dobrava Stadium
Interblock	Ljubljana	ŽŠD Ljubljana
Krško	Krško	Matija Gubec Stadium
Mura 05	Murska Sobota	Fazanerija
Šenčur	Šenčur	Šenčur Sports Park
Šmartno 1928	Šmartno ob Paki	Šmartno Stadium

== League table ==
Pos	Team	Pld	W	D	L	GF	GA	GD	Pts	Promotion or relegation
1	Aluminij (C)	27	13	9	5	54	22	+32	48	
2	Interblock	27	13	8	6	38	25	+13	47	
3	Dravinja	27	11	10	6	31	23	+8	43	
4	Mura 05 (P)	27	12	5	10	42	37	+5	41	Promotion to Slovenian PrvaLiga (Note: Aluminij, Interblock and Dravinja declined promotion to the Slovenian PrvaLiga due to financial reasons. As the next club on the table Mura 05 received and accepted an invitation to join the top division.)
5	Drava Ptuj (R)	27	11	6	10	38	41	−3	39	Excluded
6	Dob	27	11	5	11	43	44	−1	38	
7	Bela Krajina	27	9	10	8	38	39	−1	37	
8	Krško	27	8	7	12	24	35	−11	31	
9	Šenčur	27	4	10	13	37	52	−15	22	
10	Šmartno 1928	27	6	4	17	31	58	−27	22	

Source: Soccerway, NZS archive (in Slovene)
(C) Champions; (P) Promoted; (R) Relegated

== Results ==
=== First and second round ===
Home \ Away	ALU	BEL	DOB	DRV	DRA	INT	KRŠ	MUR	ŠEN	ŠMA
Aluminij		0–0	1–1	2–2	0–1	0–0	3–0	3–0	5–3	1–3
Bela Krajina	0–0		0–2	2–0	2–2	0–1	3–3	4–1	6–1	1–0
Dob	0–2	0–2		1–1	0–2	2–3	1–0	2–0	2–2	2–0
Drava Ptuj	1–3	0–2	1–4		1–4	2–1	0–0	3–1	2–2	1–1
Dravinja	3–0	1–1	1–2	1–0		1–1	1–0	0–1	1–0	1–1
Interblock	2–0	2–2	3–1	1–2	1–1		1–0	4–0	2–2	2–1
Krško	0–2	1–2	0–0	0–4	1–0	0–0		1–0	2–0	3–0
Mura 05	0–3	0–0	3–0	2–0	4–1	1–1	2–0		0–2	4–0
Šenčur	1–1	3–0	3–1	0–2	0–1	0–2	0–0	0–3		7–3
Šmartno 1928	0–4	5–4	4–2	1–2	1–1	2–1	0–2	0–1	2–2	

Source: NZS
Legend: Blue = home team win; Yellow = draw; Red = away team win.

=== Third round ===
Home \ Away	ALU	BEL	DOB	DRV	DRA	INT	KRŠ	MUR	ŠEN	ŠMA
Aluminij		6–0		5–0		0–1	4–0			4–0
Bela Krajina			0–1		1–1			0–2	1–1	2–1
Dob	1–1					2–1	4–3	4–6		
Drava Ptuj		4–1	3–1		0–1				2–2	
Dravinja	0–0		1–0					1–1	2–2	1–0
Interblock		0–1		0–1	2–1		1–1			1–0
Krško		1–1		0–1	1–0				1–0	
Mura 05	2–2			0–1		1–2	4–1			2–1
Šenčur	1–2		1–5			1–2		1–1		
Šmartno 1928			0–2	3–2			1–3		1–0	

Source: NZS
Legend: Blue = home team win; Yellow = draw; Red = away team win.

== See also ==
- 2010–11 Slovenian PrvaLiga
- 2010–11 Slovenian Third League
