= 2011–12 Slovenian Second League =

Slovenian Second League
- Season: 2011–12
- Champions: Aluminij
- Promoted: Aluminij
- Relegated: Interblock
- Matches: 135
- Goals: 362 (2.68 per match)
- Top goalscorer: Goran Vuk (16 goals)
- Biggest home win: Aluminij 8–1 Šmartno 1928
- Biggest away win: Dravinja 1–5 Aluminij; Šampion 0–4 Interblock; Dob 0–4 Šenčur
- Highest scoring: Radomlje 8–2 Dravinja

The 2011–12 Slovenian Second League season started on 6 August 2011 and ended on 19 May 2012. Each team played a total of 27 matches.

== Clubs ==
Location of teams

Club	Location	Stadium
Aluminij	Kidričevo	Aluminij Sports Park
Bela Krajina	Črnomelj	ŠRC Loka
Dob	Dob	Dob Sports Park
Dravinja	Slovenske Konjice	Dobrava Stadium
Interblock	Ljubljana	ŽŠD Ljubljana
Krško	Krško	Matija Gubec Stadium
Radomlje	Radomlje	Radomlje Sports Park
Šampion	Celje	Arena Petrol
Šenčur	Šenčur	Šenčur Sports Park
Šmartno 1928	Šmartno ob Paki	Šmartno Stadium

== League table ==
Pos	Team	Pld	W	D	L	GF	GA	GD	Pts	Promotion or relegation
1	Aluminij (C, P)	27	21	5	1	54	12	+42	68	Promotion to Slovenian PrvaLiga
2	Dob	27	13	9	5	42	33	+9	48	Qualification to promotion play-offs
3	Šenčur	27	12	7	8	46	35	+11	43	
4	Interblock (R)	27	10	8	9	33	30	+3	38	Withdrew
5	Radomlje	27	10	2	15	36	42	−6	32	
6	Krško	27	7	10	10	24	27	−3	31	
7	Šampion	27	7	7	13	38	40	−2	28	
8	Dravinja	27	8	4	15	25	49	−24	28	
9	Bela Krajina	27	6	10	11	31	40	−9	28	
10	Šmartno 1928	27	7	6	14	33	54	−21	27	

Source: Soccerway, NZS archive (in Slovene)
(C) Champions; (P) Promoted; (R) Relegated

== Results ==
=== First and second round ===
Home \ Away	ALU	BEL	DOB	DRA	INT	KRŠ	RAD	ŠAM	ŠEN	ŠMA
Aluminij		4–0	2–0	2–0	5–1	1–0	1–0	2–1	2–0	8–1
Bela Krajina	1–0		2–2	4–1	0–1	0–0	4–1	1–1	3–2	1–3
Dob	0–0	2–1		2–4	2–1	1–0	0–0	4–1	3–2	3–1
Dravinja	1–5	1–1	0–0		0–0	0–1	1–0	1–2	1–2	0–1
Interblock	1–3	1–1	0–0	0–1		1–1	1–2	1–1	0–3	2–1
Krško	0–0	0–0	0–2	3–0	1–0		2–0	1–0	1–1	1–0
Radomlje	0–1	3–1	1–2	1–0	0–1	2–0		1–0	3–0	3–3
Šampion	1–2	2–2	4–1	4–0	0–4	1–1	3–0		0–2	5–1
Šenčur	1–1	2–1	0–0	3–0	0–0	1–1	2–0	2–1		6–2
Šmartno 1928	0–1	0–0	0–0	0–0	0–2	4–2	0–2	1–0	3–2	

Source: NZS
Legend: Blue = home team win; Yellow = draw; Red = away team win.

=== Third round ===
Home \ Away	ALU	BEL	DOB	DRA	INT	KRŠ	RAD	ŠAM	ŠEN	ŠMA
Aluminij			2–1	1–0	2–1	2–0		1–1		
Bela Krajina	0–1						3–0	0–2	2–2	
Dob		4–1		3–1			1–0		0–4	4–2
Dravinja		3–0			2–1			2–1		2–1
Interblock		1–0	2–2			2–1				2–0
Krško		1–1	1–1	0–1			2–0			2–3
Radomlje	1–4			8–2	0–3			2–1	2–3	
Šampion			1–2		2–2	2–1				1–1
Šenčur	0–1			3–1	0–2	1–1		2–0		
Šmartno 1928	0–0	0–1					1–4		4–0	

Source: NZS
Legend: Blue = home team win; Yellow = draw; Red = away team win.

== See also ==
- 2011–12 Slovenian PrvaLiga
- 2011–12 Slovenian Third League
