= 2016–17 Slovenian Second League =

Slovenian Second League
- Season: 2016–17
- Champions: Triglav Kranj
- Promoted: Triglav Kranj; Ankaran
- Relegated: Zavrč
- Matches: 117
- Goals: 378 (3.23 per match)
- Top goalscorer: Matej Poplatnik (27 goals)
- Biggest home win: Dob 7–0 Zavrč
- Biggest away win: Brežice 1919 1–6 Dob
- Highest scoring: Krka 7–1 Zavrč
- Longest winning run: 10 matches Triglav
- Longest unbeaten run: 10 matches Triglav
- Longest winless run: 9 matches Zarica
- Longest losing run: 4 matches Zavrč; Zarica; Veržej; Brda
- Highest attendance: 1,000; Triglav 2–1 Krka
- Lowest attendance: 50; Zarica 0–1 Brda; Krka 0–3 Zarica
- Total attendance: 21,025
- Average attendance: 179

The 2016–17 Slovenian Second League season was the 26th edition of the Slovenian Second League. The season began on 7 August 2016 and ended on 27 May 2017.

== Teams ==
Location of teams in the 2016–17 Slovenian Second League

=== Promotion and relegation (pre-season) ===
- Krka and Zavrč were relegated from the 2015–16 Slovenian PrvaLiga
- Brda and Brežice 1919 were promoted from the 2015–16 Slovenian Third League
- Radomlje and Aluminij were promoted to the 2016–17 Slovenian PrvaLiga
- Šenčur and Tolmin were relegated to the 2016–17 Slovenian Third League.

=== Stadiums and managers ===
Team	Location	Stadium	Manager
Ankaran Hrvatini	Ankaran	ŠRC Katarina	Vlado Badžim
Brda	Dobrovo	Vipolže Stadium	Anton Žlogar
Brežice 1919	Brežice	Brežice Stadium	Albert Pobor
Dob	Dob	Dob Sports Park	Damijan Romih
Drava Ptuj	Ptuj	Ptuj City Stadium	Simon Sešlar
Krka	Novo Mesto	Portoval	Iztok Kapušin
Triglav Kranj	Kranj	Stanko Mlakar Stadium	Siniša Brkić
Veržej	Veržej	Čistina Stadium	Marko Lešnik
Zarica Kranj	Kranj	Zarica Sports Park	Robert Marušič
Zavrč	Zavrč	Zavrč Sports Park	/

== Standings ==
=== League table ===
Pos	Team	Pld	W	D	L	GF	GA	GD	Pts	Promotion, qualification or relegation
1	Triglav Kranj (C, P)	25	19	4	2	64	23	+41	61	Promoted to Slovenian PrvaLiga
2	Dob	25	16	6	3	61	26	+35	54	Declined to play promotion play-off
3	Ankaran Hrvatini (P)	25	14	4	7	45	29	+16	46	Promoted to Slovenian PrvaLiga
4	Brežice 1919	25	10	6	9	36	42	−6	36	
5	Drava Ptuj	25	9	4	12	45	55	−10	31	
6	Brda	25	6	8	11	27	34	−7	26	
7	Krka	25	7	4	14	40	42	−2	25	
8	Zarica Kranj	25	7	2	16	26	53	−27	23	
9	Veržej	25	5	6	14	21	45	−24	21	Spared from relegation (Note: NK Veržej was spared from relegation due to insufficient number of teams.)
10	Zavrč (R)	9	1	2	6	13	29	−16	5	Withdrew (Note: NK Zavrč withdrew from the competition after round 12. Only the results from the first 9 rounds count towards the table. They were relegated to the lowest league and banned from promotion to the Slovenian Third League until the 2019–20 season.)

Source: NZS (in Slovene) soccerway
Rules for classification: 1) points; 2) points in head-to-head matches; 3) goal difference in head-to-head matches; 4) away goals scored in head-to-head matches; 5) total goal difference; 6) total goals scored; 7) away goals scored in all matches; 8) fair-play; 9) draw
(C) Champions; (P) Promoted; (R) Relegated

=== Positions by round ===
Leader / Promotion to 1. SNL
Qualification to promotion play-offs
Relegation to 3. SNL

Team ╲ Round	1	2	3	4	5	6	7	8	9	10	11	12	13	14	15	16	17	18	19	20	21	22	23	24	25	26	27
Triglav Kranj	3	1	1	1	1	1	1	1	1	1	1	1	1	1	1	1	1	1	1	1	1	1	1	1	1	1	1
Dob	7	2	3	4	3	3	3	3	3	2	2	2	2	2	2	2	2	2	2	2	2	2	2	2	2	2	2
Ankaran Hrvatini	2	5	4	3	2	2	2	2	2	3	3	3	3	3	3	3	3	3	3	3	3	3	3	3	3	3	3
Brežice 1919	5	7	6	5	4	5	4	5	5	5	4	5	5	4	5	4	4	4	4	4	4	4	4	4	5	4	4
Drava Ptuj	6	4	5	7	6	6	6	7	7	7	6	6	6	5	6	6	7	7	6	6	6	6	5	5	4	5	5
Brda	4	8	9	9	9	8	7	6	6	6	7	7	7	7	7	7	6	6	7	7	7	8	7	7	7	7	6
Krka	1	3	2	2	5	4	5	4	4	4	5	4	4	6	4	5	5	5	5	5	5	5	6	6	6	6	7
Zarica Kranj	8	9	8	6	7	7	8	8	9	9	10	10	10	8	8	8	8	8	8	9	9	7	8	8	8	8	8
Veržej	10	10	10	10	10	10	9	9	8	8	8	8	8	9	9	9	9	9	9	8	8	9	9	9	9	9	9
Zavrč	9	6	7	8	8	9	10	10	10	10	9	9	9	10	10	10	10	10	10	10	10	10	10	10	10	10	10

Notes: Round 15 was the final round before the winter break

== Results ==
=== First and second cycle ===
Home \ Away	ANK	BRE	BRD	DOB	DRA	KRK	TRI	VER	ZAR	ZAV
Ankaran Hrvatini		1–3	5–0	3–3	1–0	1–2	1–0	3–0	3–0	3–0
Brežice 1919	1–0		0–0	0–2	2–1	1–1	1–4	4–2	0–1	2–1
Brda	1–2	0–0		2–2	1–3	0–0	0–1	0–0	0–1	3–1
Dob	3–1	1–0	1–0		4–2	5–1	1–2	0–0	5–0	7–0
Drava Ptuj	1–3	2–2	4–2	1–2		1–3	1–5	2–1	3–0	
Krka	0–1	1–3	0–1	0–2	4–1		1–2	3–0	0–1	7–1
Triglav Kranj	2–1	4–0	3–1	1–0	4–0	2–1		0–0	3–1	
Veržej	1–0	3–1	0–1	0–3	1–2	0–4	0–4		3–1	1–1 (Note: Results annulled and don't count towards the table.)
Zarica Kranj	2–3	1–3	0–1	1–2	3–2	0–5	0–2	1–0		
Zavrč	1–1				2–2	1–2	1–2	5–1	2–2	

Source: NZS
Legend: Blue = home team win; Yellow = draw; Red = away team win.

=== Third cycle ===
Home \ Away	ANK	BRE	BRD	DOB	DRA	KRK	TRI	VER	ZAR	ZAV
Ankaran Hrvatini		1–0			0–0		3–3		2–0	
Brežice 1919			2–0	1–6		2–2		4–1		
Brda	1–3					3–0	2–2		1–1	
Dob	2–2		2–1			1–0		0–0		
Drava Ptuj		2–0	1–6	1–2				3–1		
Krka	0–2				1–4		2–3		0–3	
Triglav Kranj		4–0		5–1	3–3				3–0	
Veržej	4–0		0–0			2–2	2–0			
Zarica Kranj		2–3		1–4	2–3			2–0		
Zavrč										

Source: NZS
Legend: Blue = home team win; Yellow = draw; Red = away team win.

== Season statistics ==
=== Top goalscorers ===
Rank	Player	Team	Goals
1	(Slovenia) Matej Poplatnik	Triglav	27
2	(Slovenia) Rok Kidrič	Dob	19
3	(Slovenia) Matej Zemljak	Ankaran	14
3	(Bosnia and Herzegovina) Adnan Bašić	Drava	14
5	(Croatia) Marko Brekalo	Krka	10
6	(Bosnia and Herzegovina) Nedo Turković	Brežice 1919	9
7	(Slovenia) Matej Potokar	Krka	8
7	(Slovenia) Nastja Čeh	Drava	8
7	(Slovenia) Jernej Leskovar	Dob	8

Source: NZS

=== Attendances ===
Pos	Team	Total	High	Low	Average	Change
1	Triglav Kranj	5,339	1,000	200	445	+54.5%
2	Brežice 1919	2,710	450	70	208	+60.0%^{^{2}}
3	Drava Ptuj	2,150	250	100	179	−47.2%
4	Zarica Kranj	2,100	500	50	175	0.0%
5	Dob	1,900	400	70	146	−12.0%
6	Brda	1,660	350	70	128	+23.1%^{^{2}}
7	Veržej	1,495	200	75	125	−36.2%
8	Krka	1,480	200	50	114	−74.2%^{^{1}}
9	Ankaran Hrvatini	1,391	200	70	107	+25.9%
10	Zavrč	800	300	100	250	−61.7%^{^{1}}
	League total	21,025	1,000	50	179	−14.8%

Source: NZS

Note ^{1}:Team played the previous season in the Slovenian PrvaLiga.
Note ^{2}:Team played the previous season in the Slovenian Third League.

== See also ==
- 2016–17 Slovenian Cup
- 2016–17 Slovenian PrvaLiga
- 2016–17 Slovenian Third League
