= 2013–14 Slovenian Second League =

Slovenian Second League
- Season: 2013–14
- Champions: Dob
- Promoted: Radomlje
- Relegated: Bela Krajina; Šampion
- Matches: 135
- Goals: 421 (3.12 per match)
- Top goalscorer: Marko Nunić (16 goals)
- Biggest home win: Veržej 7–0 Bela Krajina; Radomlje 8–1 Veržej
- Biggest away win: Bela Krajina 0–5 Aluminij; Šampion 1–6 Dob
- Highest scoring: Šenčur 5–4 Šampion; Radomlje 8–1 Veržej

The 2013–14 Slovenian Second League season began on 10 August 2013 and ended on 24 May 2014. Each team played a total of 27 matches.

== Clubs ==
Location of teams

Club	Location	Stadium
Aluminij	Kidričevo	Aluminij Sports Park
Ankaran Hrvatini	Ankaran	ŠRC Katarina
Bela Krajina	Črnomelj	ŠRC Loka
Dob	Dob	Dob Sports Park
Krško	Krško	Matija Gubec Stadium
Radomlje	Radomlje	Radomlje Sports Park
Šampion	Celje	Arena Petrol
Šenčur	Šenčur	Šenčur Sports Park
Šmartno 1928	Šmartno ob Paki	Šmartno Stadium
Veržej	Veržej	Čistina Stadium

== League table ==
Pos	Team	Pld	W	D	L	GF	GA	GD	Pts	Promotion or relegation
1	Dob (C)	27	20	3	4	52	28	+24	63	Promotion to Slovenian PrvaLiga
2	Radomlje (P)	27	15	5	7	61	36	+25	50	Qualification to promotion play-offs
3	Aluminij	27	13	8	6	45	23	+22	47	
4	Veržej	27	15	2	10	54	48	+6	47	
5	Ankaran Hrvatini	27	12	5	10	42	37	+5	41	
6	Šmartno 1928	27	9	10	8	35	38	−3	37	
7	Krško	27	10	6	11	42	37	+5	36	
8	Šenčur	27	9	4	14	42	50	−8	31	
9	Šampion (R)	27	6	4	17	38	60	−22	22	Relegation to 3. SNL – North
10	Bela Krajina (R)	27	1	3	23	10	64	−54	6	Relegation to MNZ Ljubljana (Note: Bela Krajina was unable to get a licence for the Slovenian Third League and was thus relegated to the MNZ level.)

Source: Soccerway, NZS archive (in Slovene)
Rules for classification: 1) points; 2) goal difference; 3) number of goals scored.
(C) Champions; (P) Promoted; (R) Relegated

== Results ==
=== First and second round ===
Home \ Away	ALU	ANK	BEL	DOB	KRŠ	RAD	ŠAM	ŠEN	ŠMA	VER
Aluminij		4–0	2–1	1–1	2–1	0–3	4–0	1–0	0–1	0–1
Ankaran Hrvatini	0–1		4–0	1–2	1–0	0–0	3–2	3–3	2–2	6–2
Bela Krajina	0–4	0–1		0–2	0–1	0–2	1–2	0–0	0–1	0–3
Dob	0–0	1–3	1–0		1–0	2–1	1–0	2–0	4–1	1–0
Krško	0–0	1–1	3–0	0–1		5–1	2–1	3–1	4–3	4–2
Radomlje	0–1	2–1	5–0	3–4	1–1		3–0	3–2	1–1	5–0
Šampion	2–2	0–1	0–0	1–6	3–2	2–6		3–2	1–3	0–2
Šenčur	3–3	4–0	1–0	4–0	4–1	3–0	5–4		1–0	0–3
Šmartno 1928	0–0	2–0	1–1	2–2	0–0	0–1	1–0	3–2		3–1
Veržej	0–2	3–1	4–3	0–3	2–0	3–4	3–2	2–0	1–1	

Source: NZS
Legend: Blue = home team win; Yellow = draw; Red = away team win.

=== Third round ===
Home \ Away	ALU	ANK	BEL	DOB	KRŠ	RAD	ŠAM	ŠEN	ŠMA	VER
Aluminij		0–1	5–0	3–2				5–0	1–1	
Ankaran Hrvatini					3–0	0–1	1–1		2–0	
Bela Krajina		0–2			0–2		1–4	1–0		
Dob		2–1	4–1			3–2		1–0	3–1	
Krško	3–0			1–2				4–1		0–2
Radomlje	1–4		2–1		0–0		2–1			8–1
Šampion	2–0			0–1	2–2					0–3
Šenčur		2–1				0–3	2–1		1–1	
Šmartno 1928			1–0		3–2	1–1	1–4			1–3
Veržej	0–0	2–3	7–0	2–0				2–1		

Source: NZS
Legend: Blue = home team win; Yellow = draw; Red = away team win.

== See also ==
- 2013–14 Slovenian PrvaLiga
- 2013–14 Slovenian Third League
