= 2014–15 Slovenian Second League =

Slovenian Second League
- Season: 2014–15
- Champions: Krško
- Promoted: Krško
- Relegated: Dravinja; Šmartno 1928
- Matches: 135
- Goals: 423 (3.13 per match)
- Top goalscorer: Matej Poplatnik (18 goals)
- Biggest home win: 4–0 (4 times)
- Biggest away win: 0–5 (3 times)
- Highest scoring: Šmartno 1928 4–4 Dravinja

The 2014–15 Slovenian Second League season began on 10 August 2014 and ended on 30 May 2015. Each team played a total of 27 matches.

== Clubs ==
Location of teams

Club	Location	Stadium
Aluminij	Kidričevo	Aluminij Sports Park
Ankaran Hrvatini	Ankaran	ŠRC Katarina
Dob	Dob	Dob Sports Park
Dravinja	Slovenske Konjice	Dobrava Stadium
Krško	Krško	Matija Gubec Stadium
Šenčur	Šenčur	Šenčur Sports Park
Šmartno 1928	Šmartno ob Paki	Šmartno Stadium
Tolmin	Tolmin	Brajda Sports Park
Triglav	Kranj	Stanko Mlakar Stadium
Veržej	Veržej	Čistina Stadium

== League table ==
Pos	Team	Pld	W	D	L	GF	GA	GD	Pts	Promotion or relegation
1	Krško (C, P)	27	15	6	6	48	28	+20	51	Promotion to Slovenian PrvaLiga
2	Aluminij	27	15	5	7	49	21	+28	50	Qualification to promotion play-offs
3	Dob	27	15	4	8	52	26	+26	49	
4	Ankaran Hrvatini	27	12	6	9	45	37	+8	42	
5	Tolmin	27	13	2	12	49	42	+7	41	
6	Triglav Kranj	27	11	6	10	45	41	+4	39	
7	Veržej	27	11	5	11	37	45	−8	38	
8	Šenčur	27	9	5	13	34	48	−14	32	
9	Dravinja (R)	27	7	8	12	45	47	−2	29	Relegation to 3. SNL – North
10	Šmartno 1928 (R)	27	1	5	21	19	88	−69	8	Relegation to 3. SNL – North

Source: Soccerway, NZS archive (in Slovene)
(C) Champions; (P) Promoted; (R) Relegated

== Results ==
=== First and second round ===
Home \ Away	ALU	ANK	DOB	DRA	KRŠ	ŠEN	ŠMA	TOL	TRI	VER
Aluminij		4–0	0–1	2–1	0–0	0–1	2–0	0–1	5–1	4–1
Ankaran Hrvatini	2–2		0–1	1–0	1–0	0–0	2–0	3–0	1–3	2–1
Dob	0–1	0–0		0–1	2–1	1–0	6–0	3–1	1–2	1–0
Dravinja	0–2	0–0	1–2		1–1	3–1	1–1	1–4	0–0	1–3
Krško	2–0	2–1	3–1	3–2		2–0	4–2	4–0	1–0	1–1
Šenčur	1–0	1–4	1–1	0–5	0–1		2–0	0–0	2–1	2–3
Šmartno 1928	0–2	0–5	0–5	4–4	3–3	1–3		1–0	2–2	0–0
Tolmin	0–2	4–0	3–0	3–1	1–3	3–2	4–0		3–0	1–2
Triglav Kranj	1–1	0–0	1–0	3–2	3–1	1–2	4–0	4–1		4–2
Veržej	0–3	2–2	1–0	2–1	1–2	3–0	2–0	1–1	0–2	

Source: NZS
Legend: Blue = home team win; Yellow = draw; Red = away team win.

=== Third round ===
Home \ Away	ALU	ANK	DOB	DRA	KRŠ	ŠEN	ŠMA	TOL	TRI	VER
Aluminij		2–0		2–2			2–0		3–0	2–0
Ankaran Hrvatini					1–2	6–3	3–1	2–1	2–1	
Dob	4–4	4–1		1–3			4–0			5–0
Dravinja		3–2			4–2				2–2	0–1
Krško	1–0		0–0			1–0	6–0	0–1		
Šenčur	0–3		0–2	2–2				3–1		
Šmartno 1928				1–4		1–4		2–7		0–4
Tolmin	2–1		1–3	2–0						4–2
Triglav Kranj			1–4		2–2	1–2	3–0	2–0		
Veržej		0–4			1–0	2–2			2–1	

Source: NZS
Legend: Blue = home team win; Yellow = draw; Red = away team win.

== Season statistics ==
=== Top goalscorers ===
Rank	Player	Team	Goals
1	(Slovenia) Matej Poplatnik	Triglav	18
2	(Slovenia) Marko Nunić	Aluminij	17
3	(Slovenia) Dalibor Sokanović	Tolmin	13
4	(Slovenia) Amer Krcić	Dob	11
4	(Slovenia) Luka Vekić	Ankaran	11
6	(Slovenia) Slaviša Dvorančič	Krško	9
6	(Slovenia) David Vinkovič	Veržej	9
8	(Slovenia) Emir Ljubijankić	Šenčur	8
8	(Slovenia) Klemen Kunstelj	Dob	8
8	(Slovenia) Tim Lo Duca	Tolmin	8
8	(Slovenia) Arpad Vaš	Veržej	8
8	(Slovenia) Dejan Sokanović	Tolmin	8

Source: NZS

== See also ==
- 2014–15 Slovenian PrvaLiga
- 2014–15 Slovenian Third League
