= 2019–20 Slovenian Second League =

Slovenian Second League
- Season: 2019–20
- Champions: Not awarded
- Promoted: Koper; Gorica
- Relegated: Rogaška; Dravograd
- Matches: 160
- Goals: 494 (3.09 per match)
- Top goalscorer: Not awarded

The 2019–20 Slovenian Second League season was the 29th edition of the Slovenian Second League. The season began on 27 July 2019 and ended prematurely on 11 May 2020 due to the COVID-19 pandemic, with the last matches played on 8 March 2020.

== Competition format ==
Each team was supposed to play a total of 30 matches (15 home and 15 away). Teams played two matches against each other (1 home and 1 away).

== Teams ==
Location of teams in the 2019–20 Slovenian Second League

Club	Location	Stadium	Capacity
Beltinci	Beltinci	Beltinci Sports Park	1,346
Bilje	Bilje	Stadion V dolinci	300
Brda	Dobrovo	Vipolže Stadium	193
Brežice 1919	Brežice	Brežice Stadium	516
Dob	Dob	Dob Sports Park	300
Drava Ptuj	Ptuj	Ptuj City Stadium	2,207
Dravograd	Dravograd	Dravograd Sports Centre	1,918
Fužinar	Ravne na Koroškem	Ravne City Stadium	600
Gorica	Nova Gorica	Nova Gorica Sports Park	3,100
Jadran Dekani	Dekani	Dekani Sports Park	400
Koper	Koper	Bonifika Stadium	4,047
Krka	Novo Mesto	Portoval	500
Krško	Krško	Matija Gubec Stadium	1,470
Nafta 1903	Lendava	Lendava Sports Park	2,000
Radomlje	Radomlje	Radomlje Sports Park	700
Rogaška	Rogaška Slatina	Rogaška Slatina Sports Centre	354

== League table ==
=== Standings ===
Pos	Team	Pld	W	D	L	GF	GA	GD	Pts	Promotion, qualification or relegation
1	Koper (P)	20	13	5	2	42	13	+29	44	Promotion to Slovenian PrvaLiga
2	Gorica (P)	20	13	2	5	40	22	+18	41	Qualification to promotion play-off
3	Radomlje	20	12	4	4	48	23	+25	40	
4	Nafta 1903	20	11	4	5	45	24	+21	37	
5	Fužinar	20	11	4	5	35	22	+13	37	
6	Krško	20	9	4	7	37	25	+12	31	
7	Krka	20	8	7	5	31	32	−1	31	
8	Bilje	20	8	5	7	28	25	+3	29	
9	Dob	20	7	8	5	37	35	+2	29	
10	Jadran Dekani	20	7	3	10	29	40	−11	24	
11	Drava Ptuj	20	6	3	11	28	34	−6	21	
12	Beltinci	20	5	5	10	20	36	−16	20	
13	Brda	20	4	7	9	22	38	−16	19	
14	Brežice 1919	20	3	7	10	13	29	−16	16	
15	Rogaška (R)	20	4	2	14	16	47	−31	14	Relegation to Slovenian Third League
16	Dravograd (R)	20	2	4	14	23	49	−26	10	Relegation to Slovenian Third League

Source: NZS
Rules for classification: 1) points; 2) points in head-to-head matches; 3) goal difference in head-to-head matches; 4) away goals scored in head-to-head matches; 5) total goal difference; 6) total goals scored; 7) away goals scored in all matches; 8) fair-play; 9) draw
(P) Promoted; (R) Relegated

== Results ==
Home \ Away	BEL	BIL	BRD	BRE	DOB	DRA	DVG	FUŽ	GOR	JAD	KOP	KRK	KRŠ	NAF	RAD	ROG
Beltinci		1–3	2–0	1–1		0–2	3–0		2–1	1–2				1–0	0–3	1–0
Bilje			0–1	0–0		3–0	2–1	1–1	2–3	1–2		3–3	0–2			1–1
Brda		1–3		0–1	3–3	2–3	1–1		0–1	3–2	0–7				0–3	1–0
Brežice 1919	2–0				1–2		2–1	1–4	0–0		0–1		0–1	0–0	1–1	
Dob	4–1	1–2	1–1					1–0	2–0	3–3	1–1	0–1		1–7		4–1
Drava			1–1	5–1	3–1		3–2	0–4	1–2	0–1		0–1	0–0	0–1		
Dravograd	2–2		2–2	5–1	0–1			0–2	1–3		0–2	1–1	0–2	1–3		
Fužinar	1–1	2–0	2–1		2–1				0–1	4–1	2–1		2–4	1–1	0–2	3–2
Gorica	4–1				3–3	2–0	3–0				1–2	3–0	2–3	1–3	2–1	
Jadran		1–2		1–0	1–1	3–1	5–1		0–2			1–2	1–1		1–3	3–1
Koper	2–0	1–0	1–1	1–1		1–1			0–2	4–0		4–0		2–1		3–0
Krka	2–0	2–2	3–1	0–0	2–2	1–3		1–2			2–2		3–1	3–2	1–3	
Krško	1–1		0–1		1–3			0–1		3–0	1–2	2–3		3–0	3–3	6–0
Nafta 1903	2–2	1–0	2–2	3–1		2–1	4–1			5–0	0–3				4–0	4–1
Radomlje	4–0	1–2		2–0	2–2	3–2	6–1	1–1			0–2		3–1			5–0
Rogaška		0–1		1–0		3–2	1–3	2–1	1–4	2–1		0–0	0–2		0–2	

Source: NZS
Legend: Blue = home team win; Yellow = draw; Red = away team win.

== Season statistics ==
=== Top goalscorers ===
Rank	Player	Team	Goals
1	(Slovenia) Žan Medved	Fužinar	14
1	(Croatia) Lovre Čirjak	Koper/Krško	14
3	(Belgium) Saša Varga	Radomlje	13
3	(Slovenia) Jaka Bizjak	Nafta 1903	13
5	(Croatia) Edi Baša	Koper	10
6	(Slovenia) Tadej Trdina	Fužinar	9
6	(Slovenia) Anže Pišek	Radomlje	9
6	(Slovenia) Nermin Haljeta	Drava	9
6	(Slovenia) Peter Kogelnik	Dravograd	9
6	(Slovenia) Matej Potokar	Krka	9

Source: NZS

== See also ==
- 2019–20 Slovenian Football Cup
- 2019–20 Slovenian PrvaLiga
- 2019–20 Slovenian Third League
