= 2020–21 Slovenian Second League =

Slovenian Second League
- Season: 2020–21
- Champions: Radomlje
- Promoted: Radomlje
- Relegated: Šmartno 1928; Brda
- Matches played: 176
- Goals scored: 556 (3.16 per match)
- Top goalscorer: Kaheem Parris (16 goals)

The 2020–21 Slovenian Second League season was the 30th edition of the Slovenian Second League. The season began on 11 August 2020 and ended on 22 May 2021.

== Teams ==
Location of teams in the 2020–21 Slovenian Second League

Club	Location	Stadium	Capacity
Beltinci	Beltinci	Beltinci Sports Park	1,346
Bilje	Bilje	Stadion V dolinci	300
Brda	Dobrovo	Vipolže Stadium	193
Brežice 1919	Brežice	Brežice Stadium	516
Dob	Dob	Dob Sports Park	300
Drava Ptuj	Ptuj	Ptuj City Stadium	2,207
Fužinar	Ravne na Koroškem	Ravne City Stadium (Note: Since October 2020, Fužinar played their home games at Slovenj Gradec Stadium in Slovenj Gradec, as their stadium underwent major renovations.)	600
Jadran Dekani	Dekani	Dekani Sports Park	400
Krka	Novo Mesto	Portoval	500
Krško	Krško	Matija Gubec Stadium	1,470
Nafta 1903	Lendava	Lendava Sports Park	2,000
Primorje	Ajdovščina	Ajdovščina Stadium	1,630
Radomlje	Radomlje	Radomlje Sports Park	700
Rudar Velenje	Velenje	Ob Jezeru City Stadium	1,864
Šmartno	Šmartno ob Paki	Šmartno ob Paki Stadium	717
Triglav Kranj	Kranj	Stanko Mlakar Stadium	2,060

== First stage ==
=== Standings ===
Pos	Team	Pld	W	D	L	GF	GA	GD	Pts	Qualification
1	Radomlje	15	12	2	1	39	11	+28	38	Qualification to promotion group
2	Dob	15	11	1	3	38	20	+18	34	Qualification to promotion group
3	Krka	15	10	4	1	38	15	+23	34	Qualification to promotion group
4	Brežice 1919	15	8	4	3	22	19	+3	28	Qualification to promotion group
5	Nafta 1903	15	8	4	3	47	20	+27	28	Qualification to promotion group
6	Bilje	15	8	2	5	28	23	+5	26	Qualification to promotion group
7	Triglav Kranj	15	7	2	6	18	17	+1	23	Qualification to promotion group
8	Rudar Velenje	15	6	4	5	18	18	0	22	Qualification to promotion group
9	Krško	15	5	3	7	15	25	−10	18	Qualification to relegation group
10	Fužinar	15	4	5	6	31	23	+8	17	Qualification to relegation group
11	Beltinci	15	5	1	9	22	28	−6	16	Qualification to relegation group
12	Jadran Dekani	15	4	3	8	16	24	−8	15	Qualification to relegation group
13	Drava Ptuj (Note: Drava Ptuj were deducted three points.)	15	4	1	10	22	33	−11	10	Qualification to relegation group
14	Brda	15	3	0	12	9	39	−30	9	Qualification to relegation group
15	Primorje	15	2	3	10	10	27	−17	9	Qualification to relegation group
16	Šmartno 1928	15	2	3	10	12	43	−31	9	Qualification to relegation group

Source: NZS
Rules for classification: 1) points; 2) points in head-to-head matches; 3) goal difference in head-to-head matches; 4) away goals scored in head-to-head matches; 5) total goal difference; 6) total goals scored; 7) away goals scored in all matches; 8) fair-play; 9) draw

=== Results ===
Home \ Away	BEL	BIL	BRD	BRE	DOB	DRA	FUŽ	JAD	KRK	KRŠ	NAF	PRI	RAD	RUD	ŠMA	TRI
Beltinci					0–2	2–3			2–4	3–1		5–1	0–2		1–1	0–1
Bilje	5–2				2–1	3–2				0–0		0–0	0–4		6–1	1–0
Brda	0–2	0–3		0–2		0–2		1–0				3–2		0–1		
Brežice 1919	2–1	1–3			1–4	3–1				1–1		1–0	1–3			1–0
Dob			5–0				3–2	4–1	2–0		4–4			3–1	2–1	
Drava					1–2		2–3		0–2		4–5		1–4		1–3	1–0
Fužinar	1–2	5–0	6–0	3–4				1–1		1–2	1–1					
Jadran	1–0	3–2		0–0		0–1						3–0	0–1			1–2
Krka		1–0	4–0	1–1			5–3	3–1		4–1	1–1			2–2		3–1
Krško			1–0		3–2	1–0		0–0					2–5	1–2		0–2
Nafta 1903	4–1	2–1	4–0	1–2				8–0		2–0		2–0		1–2		
Primorje					0–1	2–0	1–1		0–3	2–0			1–4		1–1	0–1
Radomlje			2–1		3–1		1–1		1–1		3–1			2–0	0–1	
Rudar	0–1	1–2		0–1		3–3	0–0	1–0				2–0				1–1
Šmartno			1–2	1–1			0–3	0–5	0–4	1–2	0–10			1–2		
Triglav			4–2		1–2		1–0				1–1		0–4		3–0	

Source: NZS
Legend: Blue = home team win; Yellow = draw; Red = away team win.

== Second stage ==
=== Promotion group ===
==== Standings ====
Pos	Team	Pld	W	D	L	GF	GA	GD	Pts	Promotion or qualification
1	Radomlje (C, P)	22	16	2	4	51	17	+34	50	Promotion to Slovenian PrvaLiga
2	Krka	22	13	6	3	50	25	+25	45	Qualification to promotion play-off
3	Nafta 1903	22	13	5	4	60	26	+34	44	
4	Dob	22	12	4	6	48	38	+10	40	
5	Brežice 1919	22	11	6	5	35	27	+8	39	
6	Bilje	22	10	4	8	43	40	+3	34	
7	Triglav Kranj	22	9	5	8	25	24	+1	32	
8	Rudar Velenje	22	7	5	10	24	34	−10	26	

Source: NZS
Rules for classification: 1) points; 2) points in head-to-head matches; 3) goal difference in head-to-head matches; 4) away goals scored in head-to-head matches; 5) total goal difference; 6) total goals scored; 7) away goals scored in all matches; 8) fair-play; 9) draw
(C) Champions; (P) Promoted

==== Results ====
Home \ Away	BIL	BRE	DOB	KRK	NAF	RAD	RUD	TRI
Bilje		3–1	5–0					1–1
Brežice 1919			3–0		3–1		4–0	1–1
Dob				3–4	1–1		2–2	3–3
Krka	2–2	1–1				2–1	3–1	
Nafta 1903	6–1			1–0		1–0		
Radomlje	5–2	2–0	0–1				3–0	
Rudar	2–1				1–2			0–1
Triglav				1–0	0–1	0–1		

Source: NZS
Legend: Blue = home team win; Yellow = draw; Red = away team win.

=== Relegation group ===
==== Standings ====
Pos	Team	Pld	W	D	L	GF	GA	GD	Pts	Relegation
9	Jadran Dekani	22	7	6	9	26	35	−9	27	
10	Krško	22	7	5	10	24	38	−14	26	
11	Fužinar	22	6	7	9	44	33	+11	25	
12	Primorje	22	6	5	11	24	32	−8	23	
13	Drava Ptuj (Note: Drava Ptuj were deducted three points.)	22	7	4	11	32	40	−8	22	
14	Beltinci	22	6	4	12	32	41	−9	22	
15	Šmartno 1928 (R)	22	5	4	13	20	51	−31	19	Relegation to Slovenian Third League
16	Brda (R)	22	4	2	16	18	55	−37	14	Relegation to Slovenian Third League

Source: NZS
Rules for classification: 1) points; 2) points in head-to-head matches; 3) goal difference in head-to-head matches; 4) away goals scored in head-to-head matches; 5) total goal difference; 6) total goals scored; 7) away goals scored in all matches; 8) fair-play; 9) draw
(R) Relegated

==== Results ====
Home \ Away	BEL	BRD	DRA	FUŽ	JAD	KRŠ	PRI	ŠMA
Beltinci		1–1			2–2	1–2		3–0
Brda				0–3	2–3		1–2	
Drava	3–2	1–1				1–1		
Fužinar	1–1		1–3				1–2	2–3
Jadran			2–1	1–1			0–4	1–0
Krško		3–4		0–4	1–1			0–1
Primorje	4–0		0–0			1–2		
Šmartno		3–0	0–1				1–1	

Source: NZS
Legend: Blue = home team win; Yellow = draw; Red = away team win.

== Season statistics ==
=== Top goalscorers ===
Rank	Player	Team	Goals
1	(Jamaica) Kaheem Parris	Krka	16
2	(Slovenia) Danijel Šturm	Bilje	13
3	(Nigeria) Meshack Ubochioma	Nafta 1903	12
3	(Croatia) Tin Matić	Bilje	12
5	(Slovenia) Nermin Haljeta	Nafta 1903	11
6	(Slovenia) Marko Huč	Krka	10
6	(Slovenia) Jakob Kodermac	Primorje	10
6	(Croatia) Stjepan Oštrek	Nafta 1903	10
9	(Slovenia) Tadej Trdina	Fužinar	9
9	(Slovenia) Luka Cerar	Radomlje	9
9	(Slovenia) Kristijan Šipek	Dob	9

Source: NZS

== See also ==
- 2020–21 Slovenian Football Cup
- 2020–21 Slovenian PrvaLiga
