= 2021–22 Slovenian Second League =

Slovenian Second League
- Season: 2021–22
- Champions: Gorica
- Promoted: Gorica
- Relegated: Brežice 1919; Drava Ptuj
- Matches played: 240
- Goals scored: 692 (2.88 per match)
- Top goalscorer: Tin Matić (21 goals)

The 2021–22 Slovenian Second League season was the 31st edition of the Slovenian Second League. The season began on 30 July 2021 and ended on 21 May 2022.

== Competition format ==
Each team played a total of 30 matches (15 home and 15 away). Teams played two matches against each other (1 home and 1 away).

== Teams ==
Location of teams in the 2021–22 Slovenian Second League

Club	Location	Stadium	Capacity
Beltinci	Beltinci	Beltinci Sports Park	1,346
Bilje	Bilje	Stadion V dolinci	300
Brežice 1919	Brežice	Brežice Stadium	516
Dob	Dob	Dob Sports Park	300
Drava Ptuj	Ptuj	Ptuj City Stadium	2,207
Fužinar	Ravne na Koroškem	Ravne City Stadium	500
Gorica	Nova Gorica	Nova Gorica Sports Park	3,100
Ilirija 1911	Ljubljana	Ilirija Sports Park	1,000
Jadran Dekani	Dekani	Dekani Sports Park	400
Krka	Novo Mesto	Portoval	500
Krško	Krško	Matija Gubec Stadium	1,470
Nafta 1903	Lendava	Lendava Sports Park	2,000
Primorje	Ajdovščina	Ajdovščina Stadium	1,630
Rogaška	Rogaška Slatina	Rogaška Slatina Sports Centre	400
Rudar Velenje	Velenje	Ob Jezeru City Stadium	1,864
Triglav Kranj	Kranj	Stanko Mlakar Stadium	2,060

== League table ==
=== Standings ===
Pos	Team	Pld	W	D	L	GF	GA	GD	Pts	Promotion, qualification or relegation
1	Gorica (C, P)	30	23	3	4	55	20	+35	72	Promotion to Slovenian PrvaLiga
2	Triglav Kranj	30	18	8	4	55	19	+36	62	Qualification to promotion play-off
3	Krka	30	14	9	7	54	35	+19	51	
4	Rogaška	30	16	3	11	51	38	+13	51	
5	Rudar Velenje	30	16	1	13	51	43	+8	49	
6	Nafta 1903	30	13	8	9	68	36	+32	47	
7	Bilje	30	12	9	9	38	39	−1	45	
8	Primorje	30	11	8	11	46	36	+10	41	
9	Dob	30	11	6	13	45	46	−1	39	
10	Ilirija 1911	30	10	8	12	35	37	−2	38	
11	Fužinar	30	10	7	13	46	52	−6	37	
12	Beltinci	30	9	8	13	34	47	−13	35	
13	Jadran Dekani	30	6	13	11	31	38	−7	31	
14	Krško	30	6	8	16	25	54	−29	26	
15	Brežice 1919 (R)	30	4	8	18	28	60	−32	20	Relegation to Slovenian Third League
16	Drava Ptuj (R)	30	5	5	20	30	92	−62	20	Relegation to Slovenian Third League

Source: NZS
Rules for classification: 1) points; 2) points in head-to-head matches; 3) goal difference in head-to-head matches; 4) away goals scored in head-to-head matches; 5) total goal difference; 6) total goals scored; 7) away goals scored in all matches; 8) fair-play; 9) draw
(C) Champions; (P) Promoted; (R) Relegated

== Results ==
Home \ Away	BEL	BIL	BRE	DOB	DRA	FUŽ	GOR	ILI	JAD	KRK	KRŠ	NAF	PRI	ROG	RUD	TRI
Beltinci		0–1	3–2	1–1	3–1	0–3	0–4	2–2	2–2	1–1	0–1	1–0	0–0	2–1	0–3	0–1
Bilje	4–0		2–0	2–0	6–2	2–1	0–2	1–0	0–0	2–2	0–0	2–5	0–3	1–1	0–2	0–0
Brežice 1919	1–3	0–2		0–2	7–1	1–1	0–3	2–1	1–1	0–1	0–0	1–1	0–1	0–2	1–2	1–1
Dob	2–0	2–0	2–0		2–5	1–1	0–2	0–2	1–1	2–2	7–2	0–5	0–1	2–1	1–2	1–1
Drava	1–1	0–1	2–4	1–6		2–0	2–2	0–0	0–1	1–0	0–1	0–6	2–4	1–3	0–4	2–6
Fužinar	2–1	3–4	0–0	2–3	5–0		1–2	2–1	1–1	2–1	0–1	4–2	3–2	3–1	3–1	1–1
Gorica	1–1	3–2	2–0	2–0	0–1	3–0		0–1	1–0	2–0	2–0	1–0	2–1	2–1	3–0	2–0
Ilirija 1911	2–2	0–0	2–2	1–0	4–2	4–2	0–1		1–1	0–1	2–0	1–0	0–1	1–4	3–0	0–2
Jadran	4–1	0–0	0–0	2–1	1–2	1–2	1–2	1–1		0–0	1–0	1–1	4–0	2–0	0–1	1–1
Krka	3–2	1–1	4–0	1–0	5–0	3–0	2–2	2–0	2–0		2–1	4–1	3–3	0–1	2–2	1–2
Krško	0–3	0–1	2–1	1–1	0–0	2–2	0–1	0–2	2–1	2–1		0–2	0–3	3–4	1–2	0–4
Nafta 1903	1–0	4–1	5–0	2–3	6–0	4–1	2–3	2–1	6–0	1–1	2–2		0–0	2–3	2–0	1–1
Primorje	0–2	2–2	4–0	1–2	1–1	3–0	0–1	3–0	3–3	1–2	2–2	1–1		2–0	4–0	0–1
Rogaška	0–1	3–0	4–0	3–1	3–0	0–0	1–3	2–0	3–0	1–2	1–1	1–3	1–0		1–0	2–1
Rudar	1–2	0–1	4–1	2–1	4–1	3–1	2–0	1–2	2–1	3–4	3–1	3–1	2–0	2–3		0–1
Triglav	2–0	3–0	2–3	0–1	6–0	2–0	2–1	1–1	1–0	2–1	4–0	0–0	2–0	3–0	2–0	

Source: NZS
Legend: Blue = home team win; Yellow = draw; Red = away team win.

== Season statistics ==
=== Top goalscorers ===
Rank	Player	Team	Goals
1	(Croatia) Tin Matić	Triglav	21
2	(United States) Brian Saramago	Rudar	17
3	(Croatia) Josip Majić	Krka	15
4	(Slovenia) Vedran Vinko	Nafta 1903	14
5	(Slovenia) Alen Krajnc	Gorica/Rogaška	13
5	(Slovenia) Žan Leban	Gorica	13
7	(Slovenia) Etien Velikonja	Gorica	12
8	(Slovenia) Dejan Djermanović	Ilirija 1911	11
8	(Slovenia) Nermin Haljeta	Nafta 1903	11
8	(Slovenia) Nejc Gradišar	Brežice 1919/Rogaška	11

Source: NZS

== See also ==
- 2021–22 Slovenian Football Cup
- 2021–22 Slovenian PrvaLiga
