= 2017–18 Slovenian Second League =

Slovenian Second League
- Season: 2017–18
- Champions: Mura
- Promoted: Mura
- Relegated: Zarica Kranj; Veržej
- Matches: 240
- Goals: 775 (3.23 per match)
- Best player: Luka Bobičanec
- Top goalscorer: Marko Roginić (21 goals)
- Biggest home win: Nafta 1903 9–0 Zarica
- Biggest away win: Veržej 0–8 Mura
- Highest scoring: Bravo 9–2 Radomlje
- Highest attendance: 3,800; Mura 1–2 Nafta 1903
- Lowest attendance: 40; Veržej 1–2 Krka
- Total attendance: 66,505
- Average attendance: 277

The 2017–18 Slovenian Second League season was the 27th edition of the Slovenian Second League. The season began on 4 August 2017 and ended on 26 May 2018.

== Competition format ==
Each team played a total of 30 matches (15 home and 15 away). Teams played two matches against each other (one home and one away).

== Teams ==
Location of teams in the 2017–18 Slovenian Second League

On 29 June 2016, the Football Association of Slovenia decided to expand the Second League from 10 to 16 teams for the 2017–18 season.

The key for the 16 teams contesting the league was:

- 1 relegated team from the 2016–17 Slovenian PrvaLiga
- 7 teams ranked second to eighth in the 2016–17 Slovenian Second League
- The best two teams from each of the four groups in the 2016–17 Slovenian Third League, for a total of 8 teams.

=== Stadiums and locations ===
Team	Location	Stadium	Capacity
Bravo	Ljubljana	Šiška Sports Park	2,308
Brda	Dobrovo	Vipolže Stadium	193
Brežice 1919	Brežice	Brežice Stadium	516
Dob	Dob	Dob Sports Park	300
Drava Ptuj	Ptuj	Ptuj City Stadium	2,207
Fužinar	Ravne na Koroškem	Ravne City Stadium	600
Ilirija 1911	Ljubljana	Ilirija Sports Park	1,440
Jadran Dekani	Dekani	Dekani Sports Park	800
Krka	Novo Mesto	Portoval	500
Mura	Murska Sobota	Fazanerija City Stadium	3,782
Nafta 1903	Lendava	Lendava Sports Park	2,000
Radomlje	Radomlje	Radomlje Sports Park	700
Rogaška	Rogaška Slatina	Rogaška Slatina Sports Centre	354
Tabor Sežana	Sežana	Rajko Štolfa Stadium	1,310
Veržej	Veržej	Čistina Stadium	405
Zarica Kranj	Kranj	Zarica Sports Park	315

Note: "Capacity" includes seating capacity only. Most stadiums also have standing areas.

=== Personnel ===
Team	Manager	Captain
Bravo	Dejan Grabić	Milan Đajić
Brda	Anton Žlogar	Marko Rojc
Brežice 1919	Iztok Kapušin	Dejan Urbanč
Dob	Nenad Toševski	Klemen Kunstelj
Drava Ptuj	Simon Sešlar	Nastja Čeh
Fužinar	Edin Osmanović	/
Ilirija 1911	Stanko Božičevič	Marko Đoković
Jadran Dekani	Nevij Finkšt	Luka Stepančič
Krka	Borivoje Lučić	Darko Marjanović
Mura	Ante Šimundža	Alen Kozar
Nafta 1903	Franc Fridl	Patrik Vöröš
Radomlje	Nermin Bašić	Igor Barukčič
Rogaška	Ibrahim Neskić	Aleš Grošič
Tabor Sežana	Uroš Barut	Klemen Kariž
Veržej	Marko Lešnik	Tadej Čuk
Zarica Kranj	Brane Pavlin	Blaž Poljanec

== League table ==
=== Standings ===
Pos	Team	Pld	W	D	L	GF	GA	GD	Pts	Promotion, qualification or relegation
1	Mura (C, P)	30	23	3	4	86	22	+64	72	Promotion to Slovenian PrvaLiga
2	Drava Ptuj	30	21	3	6	68	37	+31	66	Qualification to promotion play-off
3	Nafta 1903	30	20	4	6	69	28	+41	64	
4	Radomlje	30	17	6	7	58	47	+11	57	
5	Krka	30	15	4	11	49	47	+2	49	
6	Bravo	30	14	7	9	55	32	+23	49	
7	Tabor Sežana	30	13	9	8	46	37	+9	48	
8	Ilirija	30	12	3	15	44	53	−9	39	
9	Brda	30	11	5	14	37	42	−5	38	
10	Dob	30	11	4	15	41	46	−5	37	
11	Jadran Dekani	30	10	6	14	39	64	−25	36	
12	Brežice 1919	30	7	9	14	36	51	−15	30	
13	Rogaška	30	8	3	19	42	54	−12	27	
14	Fužinar	30	7	5	18	46	70	−24	26	
15	Zarica Kranj (R)	30	6	7	17	36	64	−28	25	Relegation to Slovenian Third League
16	Veržej (R)	30	4	4	22	23	81	−58	16	Relegation to Slovenian Third League

Source: Football Association of Slovenia
Rules for classification: 1) points; 2) points in head-to-head matches; 3) goal difference in head-to-head matches; 4) away goals scored in head-to-head matches; 5) total goal difference; 6) total goals scored; 7) away goals scored in all matches; 8) fair-play; 9) draw
(C) Champions; (P) Promoted; (R) Relegated

== Results ==
Home \ Away	BRA	BRD	BRE	DOB	DRA	FUŽ	ILI	JAD	KRK	MUR	NAF	RAD	ROG	TAB	VER	ZAR
Bravo		0–1	0–1	1–0	2–1	4–0	4–0	2–3	1–2	0–3	1–0	9–2	1–0	0–0	6–0	4–1
Brda	3–0		1–1	4–0	0–1	2–0	1–2	0–2	1–0	1–4	0–1	0–0	0–0	0–1	4–3	0–3
Brežice 1919	0–0	1–0		1–4	1–3	2–0	0–0	0–2	3–1	0–2	2–3	0–1	1–1	0–1	5–2	1–1
Dob	2–2	1–1	1–1		1–2	3–4	2–0	2–0	3–0	1–2	1–0	2–1	3–1	1–2	0–1	2–5
Drava	1–0	5–2	4–0	1–0		2–2	0–4	1–1	3–1	2–3	3–1	2–1	3–0	0–1	6–0	2–0
Fužinar	1–1	1–0	2–4	1–2	2–4		0–1	6–0	4–2	1–4	0–2	1–5	2–1	2–6	3–0	1–2
Ilirija	1–3	0–2	2–1	0–2	2–3	2–0		4–2	4–1	0–1	0–4	1–2	4–1	0–3	0–0	2–1
Jadran	1–4	2–1	1–1	3–2	1–4	2–2	4–2		2–2	0–0	0–1	0–3	0–6	0–1	3–0	2–0
Krka	3–0	0–0	5–0	2–1	0–1	3–2	1–0	3–1		2–1	0–0	2–1	1–2	3–2	2–0	4–2
Mura	2–2	4–0	3–2	5–1	1–2	6–0	2–0	3–0	1–2		1–2	4–0	2–0	3–0	6–2	1–0
Nafta	2–1	3–0	2–2	1–0	4–1	2–1	2–2	6–0	1–0	2–2		1–2	4–1	3–1	2–0	9–0
Radomlje	1–1	3–2	4–2	3–0	3–2	1–1	5–2	3–1	1–1	0–3	1–0		2–1	1–1	3–2	3–1
Rogaška	0–3	0–1	2–1	1–2	2–4	4–2	1–2	3–0	4–1	0–3	0–1	2–3		1–1	0–1	0–2
Tabor	0–1	1–2	2–2	0–0	1–1	1–0	3–2	0–2	4–1	0–1	2–1	0–3	3–1		3–0	3–3
Veržej	1–2	2–4	1–0	0–2	0–2	1–4	1–2	0–2	1–2	0–8	3–5	0–0	0–4	1–1		0–0
Zarica	0–0	1–4	0–1	1–0	1–2	1–1	1–3	2–2	1–2	0–5	1–4	3–0	1–3	2–2	0–1	

Source: NZS
Legend: Blue = home team win; Yellow = draw; Red = away team win.

== Season statistics ==
=== Top goalscorers ===
Rank	Player	Team	Goals
1	(Croatia) Marko Roginić	Nafta 1903	21
2	(Slovenia) Anel Hajrić	Radomlje	16
2	(Slovenia) Alen Neskič	Rogaška	16
4	(Slovenia) Rok Sirk	Mura	15
4	(Slovenia) Vedran Vinko	Nafta 1903	15
4	(Croatia) Luka Bobičanec	Mura	15
7	(Slovenia) Milan Đajić	Bravo	14
7	(Slovenia) Amadej Maroša	Mura	14
9	(Slovenia) Mustafa Nukić	Ilirija 1911	13

Source: NZS

=== Attendance ===
Pos	Team	Total	High	Low	Average	Change
1	Mura	16,850	3,800	600	1,123	+37.1%^{^{2}}
2	Nafta 1903	7,300	2,200	300	487	−23.7%^{^{2}}
3	Drava Ptuj	5,500	1,500	200	367	+105.0%
4	Fužinar	4,650	900	150	310	+25.0%^{^{2}}
5	Tabor Sežana	4,183	400	200	279	+24.0%^{^{2}}
6	Bravo	3,610	600	60	241	+18.7%^{^{2}}
7	Rogaška	3,540	400	75	236	+81.5%^{^{2}}
8	Radomlje	3,240	500	100	216	−60.7%^{^{1}}
9	Ilirija 1911	2,870	750	70	191	+19.4%^{^{2}}
10	Brežice 1919	2,730	350	50	182	−12.5%
11	Jadran Dekani	2,650	400	80	177	+51.3%^{^{2}}
12	Dob	2,270	400	70	151	+3.4%
13	Veržej	2,180	450	40	145	+16.0%
14	Krka	1,760	300	50	117	+2.6%
15	Zarica	1,635	150	60	109	−37.7%
16	Brda	1,537	150	70	102	−76.9%
	League total	66,505	3,800	40	277	+54.7%

Source: NZS

Note ^{1}:Team played the previous season in the Slovenian PrvaLiga.
Note ^{2}:Team played the previous season in the Slovenian Third League.

== See also ==
- 2017–18 Slovenian Football Cup
- 2017–18 Slovenian PrvaLiga
- 2017–18 Slovenian Third League
