= 2012–13 Slovenian Second League =

Slovenian Second League
- Season: 2012–13
- Champions: Zavrč
- Promoted: Zavrč
- Relegated: Dravinja
- Matches: 135
- Goals: 428 (3.17 per match)
- Top goalscorer: Josip Golubar; Amer Krcić (13 goals each)
- Biggest home win: Krka 7–0 Šmartno
- Biggest away win: Dravinja 0–6 Dob
- Highest scoring: Šmartno 2–7 Zavrč

The 2012–13 Slovenian Second League season began on 4 August 2012 and ended on 25 May 2013. Each team played a total of 27 matches.

== Clubs ==
Location of teams

Club	Location	Stadium
Bela Krajina	Črnomelj	ŠRC Loka
Dob	Dob	Dob Sports Park
Dravinja	Slovenske Konjice	Dobrava Stadium
Krka	Novo Mesto	Portoval
Krško	Krško	Matija Gubec Stadium
Radomlje	Radomlje	Radomlje Sports Park
Šampion	Celje	Arena Petrol
Šenčur	Šenčur	Šenčur Sports Park
Šmartno 1928	Šmartno ob Paki	Šmartno Stadium
Zavrč	Zavrč	Zavrč Sports Park

== League table ==
Pos	Team	Pld	W	D	L	GF	GA	GD	Pts	Promotion or relegation
1	Zavrč (C, P)	27	20	4	3	69	25	+44	64	Promotion to Slovenian PrvaLiga
2	Dob	27	18	3	6	63	27	+36	57	Qualification to promotion play-offs
3	Krka (P)	27	16	5	6	63	24	+39	53	
4	Krško	27	10	7	10	39	41	−2	37	
5	Radomlje	27	9	7	11	38	42	−4	34	
6	Šenčur	27	8	8	11	37	46	−9	32	
7	Šampion	27	10	2	15	32	50	−18	32	
8	Šmartno 1928	27	9	3	15	31	51	−20	30	
9	Bela Krajina	27	7	4	16	24	56	−32	25	
10	Dravinja (R)	27	4	5	18	32	66	−34	17	Relegation to 3. SNL – East

Source: Soccerway, NZS archive (in Slovene)
(C) Champions; (P) Promoted; (R) Relegated

== Results ==
=== First and second round ===
Home \ Away	BEL	DOB	DRA	KRK	KRŠ	RAD	ŠAM	ŠEN	ŠMA	ZAV
Bela Krajina		0–2	2–2	0–2	2–1	2–1	1–2	2–1	2–1	0–2
Dob	4–0		3–0	0–1	1–2	4–1	0–2	2–1	2–1	1–1
Dravinja	2–3	0–4		0–2	0–3	1–3	1–1	3–1	2–4	3–5
Krka	4–0	2–2	6–0		5–0	3–0	3–0	3–1	0–1	1–3
Krško	1–0	0–1	1–1	1–1		1–1	1–0	3–3	1–2	1–5
Radomlje	4–1	1–3	4–0	1–1	1–4		2–0	0–0	2–3	0–0
Šampion	2–0	2–3	1–0	2–3	2–2	0–2		1–2	2–0	1–6
Šenčur	1–1	2–2	2–1	0–0	4–1	3–2	0–1		0–0	2–0
Šmartno 1928	1–1	0–3	1–2	0–1	2–0	1–0	1–0	2–3		1–2
Zavrč	3–1	3–1	4–1	2–3	1–0	3–0	2–1	2–1	4–0	

Source: NZS
Legend: Blue = home team win; Yellow = draw; Red = away team win.

=== Third round ===
Home \ Away	BEL	DOB	DRA	KRK	KRŠ	RAD	ŠAM	ŠEN	ŠMA	ZAV
Bela Krajina		0–6					0–1		1–2	0–1
Dob			2–1		2–0	4–1		3–1		2–0
Dravinja	0–0				0–2	3–3	2–3			
Krka	6–0	3–2	1–0				2–3		7–0	
Krško	1–0			2–2			3–1	6–1		
Radomlje	0–1			2–1	2–0			0–0		
Šampion		2–1				1–2			0–3	0–5
Šenčur	3–4		0–4	1–0			3–1		1–1	
Šmartno 1928		0–3	1–2		0–1	1–2				2–7
Zavrč			4–1	1–0	1–1	1–1		1–0		

Source: NZS
Legend: Blue = home team win; Yellow = draw; Red = away team win.

== See also ==
- 2012–13 Slovenian PrvaLiga
- 2012–13 Slovenian Third League
