= 2009–10 Slovenian Third League =

Slovenian Third League
- Season: 2009–10
- Champions: Šmartno 1928 (East); Adria (West)
- Promoted: Šmartno 1928; Dob
- Relegated: Pesnica; Mons Claudius; Jezero Medvode; Lesce; Zagorje
- Matches: 364
- Goals: 1,270 (3.49 per match)
- Top goalscorer: Alen Mujanovič (27 goals)

The 2009–10 Slovenian Third League was the 18th season of the Slovenian Third League, the third highest level in the Slovenian football system. The season began on 15 August 2009 and ended on 5 June 2010.

- Slovan was denied licence after the previous season.

== Clubs East ==
Club	Location	Stadium	2008–09 position
Čarda	Martjanci	ŠRC Martjanci	11th
Dravograd	Dravograd	Dravograd Sports Centre	2nd
Kovinar Štore	Štore	Na Lipi Stadium	3rd
Malečnik	Malečnik	Berl Sports Centre	9th
Mons Claudius	Rogatec	Rogaška Slatina City Stadium	12th
Odranci	Odranci	ŠRC Odranci	4th
Paloma	Sladki Vrh	Sladki Vrh Sports Park	10th
Pesnica	Pesnica	Pesnica Sports Park	2nd, Styrian
Šampion	Celje	Olimp Stadium	7th
Šmartno 1928	Šmartno ob Paki	Šmartno Stadium	5th
Stojnci	Stojnci	Stojnci Sports Park	6th
Tromejnik	Kuzma	Kuzma Football Stadium	1st, Pomurska
Veržej	Veržej	Čistina Stadium	8th
Zreče	Zreče	Zreče Stadium	1st, Styrian

=== League standing ===
Pos	Team	Pld	W	D	L	GF	GA	GD	Pts	Promotion or relegation
1	Šmartno 1928 (C, P)	26	17	4	5	76	39	+37	55	Promotion to Slovenian Second League
2	Šampion	26	15	7	4	50	18	+32	52	
3	Stojnci	26	14	4	8	53	36	+17	46	
4	Čarda	26	14	3	9	53	22	+31	45	
5	Dravograd	26	12	8	6	53	32	+21	44	
6	Malečnik	26	13	3	10	55	53	+2	42	
7	Odranci	26	12	5	9	61	47	+14	41	
8	Veržej	26	11	3	12	48	51	−3	36	
9	Zreče	26	9	7	10	41	53	−12	34	
10	Kovinar Štore	26	8	7	11	35	41	−6	31	
11	Tromejnik	26	8	6	12	38	44	−6	30	
12	Paloma	26	7	4	15	38	61	−23	25	
13	Pesnica (R)	26	6	5	15	34	55	−21	23	Relegation to Slovenian Regional Leagues
14	Mons Claudius (R)	26	2	2	22	28	111	−83	8	Relegation to Slovenian Regional Leagues

Source: MNZ Maribor
(C) Champions; (P) Promoted; (R) Relegated

== Clubs West ==
Club	Location	Stadium	2008–09 position
Adria	Miren	Igrišče Pri Štantu	12th
Ankaran Hrvatini	Ankaran	ŠRC Katarina	1st, Littoral
Brda	Dobrovo	Vipolže Stadium	5th
Dob	Dob	Dob Sports Park	7th
Jadran	Dekani	Dekani Sports Park	2nd
Jezero Medvode	Medvode	Ob Sori Stadium	2nd, Ljubljana
Kamnik	Kamnik	Stadion Prijateljstva	10th
Kranj	Kranj	Zarica Sports Park	6th
Krka	Novo Mesto	Portoval	4th
Lesce	Lesce	Na Žagi Stadium	1st, Carniolan
Radomlje	Radomlje	Radomlje Sports Park	3rd
Sava	Kranj	Stražišče Sports Park	8th
Tolmin	Tolmin	Brajda Sports Park	9th
Zagorje	Zagorje ob Savi	Zagorje City Stadium	10th, 2.SNL

=== League standing ===
Pos	Team	Pld	W	D	L	GF	GA	GD	Pts	Promotion or relegation
1	Adria (C)	26	16	6	4	62	29	+33	54	
2	Dob (P)	26	15	7	4	62	25	+37	52	Promotion to Slovenian Second League
3	Brda	26	15	4	7	60	27	+33	49	
4	Radomlje	26	15	4	7	55	38	+17	49	
5	Kranj	26	12	6	8	51	44	+7	42	
6	Jadran Dekani	26	11	8	7	36	28	+8	41	
7	Tolmin	26	11	8	7	49	45	+4	41	
8	Ankaran	26	12	4	10	43	35	+8	40	
9	Kamnik	26	9	6	11	37	39	−2	33	
10	Krka	26	9	4	13	44	41	+3	31	
11	Sava Kranj	26	6	5	15	24	53	−29	23	
12	Jezero Medvode (R)	26	5	6	15	29	63	−34	21	Relegation to Slovenian Regional Leagues
13	Lesce (R)	26	5	5	16	27	68	−41	20	Relegation to Slovenian Regional Leagues
14	Zagorje (R)	26	3	3	20	28	72	−44	12	Relegation to Slovenian Regional Leagues

(C) Champions; (P) Promoted; (R) Relegated

== See also ==
- 2009–10 Slovenian Second League
