= NK Veržej =

Slovenian football club

Veržej
- Full name: Športno društvo Nogometni klub Veržej
- Founded: 1963; 63 years ago
- Ground: Čistina Stadium
- Capacity: 405
- President: Boštjan Puhar
- Website: sdverzej.si
Home colours	Away colours

Nogometni klub Veržej (English: Veržej Football Club), commonly referred to as NK Veržej or simply Veržej, is a Slovenian football club based in Veržej. The club was founded in 1963.

== Honours ==
- Slovenian Third League
  - Winners: 1992–93, 2012–13
- MNZ Murska Sobota Cup
  - Winners: 2003–04, 2010–11, 2014–15

== League history since 1991 ==
Season	League	Position
1991–92	2. SNL – East	6th (Note: Lost in relegation play-offs.)
1992–93	3. SNL – East	1st
1993–94	2. SNL	5th
1994–95	2. SNL	14th
1995–96	3. SNL – East	13th
1996–97	1. MNL (level 4)	2nd
1997–98	1. MNL (level 4)	2nd
1998–99	3. SNL – East	2nd
1999–2000	3. SNL – East	10th
2000–01	3. SNL – East	9th
2001–02	3. SNL – East	6th
2002–03	3. SNL – East	3rd
2003–04	3. SNL – East	3rd
2004–05	3. SNL – East	3rd
2005–06	3. SNL – East	9th
2006–07	3. SNL – East	2nd
2007–08	3. SNL – East	4th

Season	League	Position
2008–09	3. SNL – East	8th
2009–10	3. SNL – East	8th
2010–11	3. SNL – East	13th
2011–12	3. SNL – East	7th
2012–13	3. SNL – East	1st
2013–14	2. SNL	4th
2014–15	2. SNL	7th
2015–16	2. SNL	6th
2016–17	2. SNL	9th
2017–18	2. SNL	16th
2018–19	3. SNL – East	5th
2019–20	3. SNL – East	11th
2020–21	Pomurska League	2nd (Note: The season was halted in October 2020 due to the COVID-19 pandemic in Slovenia.)
2021–22	Pomurska League	14th
2022–23	Pomurska League	14th
2023–24	Pomurska League	10th
2024–25	Pomurska League	12th
