= NK Brežice 1919 =

Slovenian football club

Brežice 1919
- Full name: Nogometni klub Brežice 1919
- Founded: 1919; 107 years ago 2013; 13 years ago (refounded as NK Brežice 1919)
- Ground: Brežice Stadium
- Capacity: 507
- President: Sandi Hervol
- Head coach: Robert Regvar
- League: Slovenian Second League
- 2025–26: 3. SNL – East, 2nd of 14 (promoted)
- Website: www.nkbrezice.si
Home colours	Away colours

NK Brežice 1919 (Nogometni klub Brežice 1919, 'Brežice 1919 Football Club'), commonly referred to as simply Brežice, is a Slovenian football club from Brežice. As of the 2026–27 season, they compete in the Slovenian Second League, the second tier of Slovenian football.

The club was formerly known as Svoboda Brežice.

== Honours ==
- Slovenian Third League
  - Winners (1): 2015–16
- Slovenian Fourth Division
  - Winners (3): 1992–93, 2001–02, 2014–15
- Slovenian Fifth Division
  - Winners (2): 2007–08, 2009–10
- MNZ Celje Cup
  - Winners (2): 2015–16, 2018–19

== League history since 1991 ==
Season	Tier	League	Position
1991–92	3	MNZ Celje	6th
1992–93	4	MNZ Celje	1st
1993–94	3	3. SNL – East	7th
1994–95	3	3. SNL – East	13th
1995–96	4	MNZ Celje	5th
1996–97	4	MNZ Celje	5th
1997–98	4	MNZ Celje	6th
1998–99	4	MNZ Celje	3rd
1999–2000	4	MNZ Celje	5th
2000–01	4	MNZ Celje	4th
2001–02	4	MNZ Celje	1st
2002–03	3	3. SNL – North	11th (Note: Merged with NK Krško before the season; competed under the name Krško Posavje.)
2003–07	Didn't enter any competitions		
2007–08	5	MNZ Celje	1st
2008–09	4	Styrian League	13th

Season	Tier	League	Position
2009–10	5	MNZ Celje	1st (Note: Declined promotion.)
2010–11	5	MNZ Celje	7th
2011–14	Didn't enter any competitions		
2014–15	4	MNZ Celje	1st
2015–16	3	3. SNL – North	1st
2016–17	2	2. SNL	4th
2017–18	2	2. SNL	12th
2018–19	2	2. SNL	14th
2019–20	2	2. SNL	14th
2020–21	2	2. SNL	5th
2021–22	2	2. SNL	15th
2022–23	3	3. SNL – East	6th
2023–24	3	3. SNL – East	5th
2024–25	3	3. SNL – East	2nd
2025–26	3	3. SNL – East	2nd
