= NK Ankaran =

Ankaran
- Full name: Nogometni klub Ankaran
- Nickname: Galebi (The Seagulls)
- Founded: 1966; 60 years ago
- Dissolved: 2019; 7 years ago
- Ground: ŠRC Ankaran
Home colours	Away colours

Nogometni klub Ankaran (English: Ankaran Football Club), commonly referred to as NK Ankaran or simply Ankaran, was a Slovenian football club from Koper. The club was founded in 1966 as NK Galeb and was located in Ankaran until 2017, when they relocated to Koper. The club was dissolved following the 2018–19 season due to financial debt.

== Honours ==
- Slovenian Third League
  - Winners: 2012–13
- Littoral League (fourth tier)
  - Winners: 1996–97, 2008–09

== League history since 1991 ==
Season	League	Position
1991–92	Littoral League (level 3)	9th (Note: With creation of 3. SNL, they effectively dropped to fourth level.)
1992–93	Littoral League (level 4)	6th
1993–94	Littoral League (level 4)	11th
1994–95	Littoral League (level 4)	8th
1995–96	Littoral League (level 4)	4th
1996–97	Littoral League (level 4)	1st
1997–98	3. SNL – West	3rd
1998–99	3. SNL – West	8th
1999–2000	3. SNL – West	3rd
2000–01	3. SNL – West	7th
2001–02	3. SNL – West	7th
2002–03	3. SNL – West	4th
2003–04	3. SNL – West	6th
2004–05	Littoral League (level 4)	11th
2005–06	Littoral League (level 4)	8th
2006–07	Littoral League (level 4)	10th
2007–08	Littoral League (level 4)	4th
2008–09	Littoral League (level 4)	1st
2009–10	3. SNL – West	8th
2010–11	3. SNL – West	8th
2011–12	3. SNL – West	2nd
2012–13	3. SNL – West	1st
2013–14	2. SNL	5th
2014–15	2. SNL	4th
2015–16	2. SNL	8th
2016–17	2. SNL	3rd
2017–18	1. SNL	10th
2018–19	2. SNL	16th
