= NK Dob =

Slovenian football club

Dob
- Full name: Nogometni klub Roltek Dob
- Nicknames: Roletarji (The Blindmakers); Modri (The Blues)
- Founded: 1961; 65 years ago
- Ground: Dob Sports Park
- Capacity: 300
- President: Bojan Gasior
- Head coach: Žan Cerar
- League: 3. SNL – West
- 2025–26: 3. SNL – West, 3rd of 14
- Website: nkdob.si
Home colours	Away colours

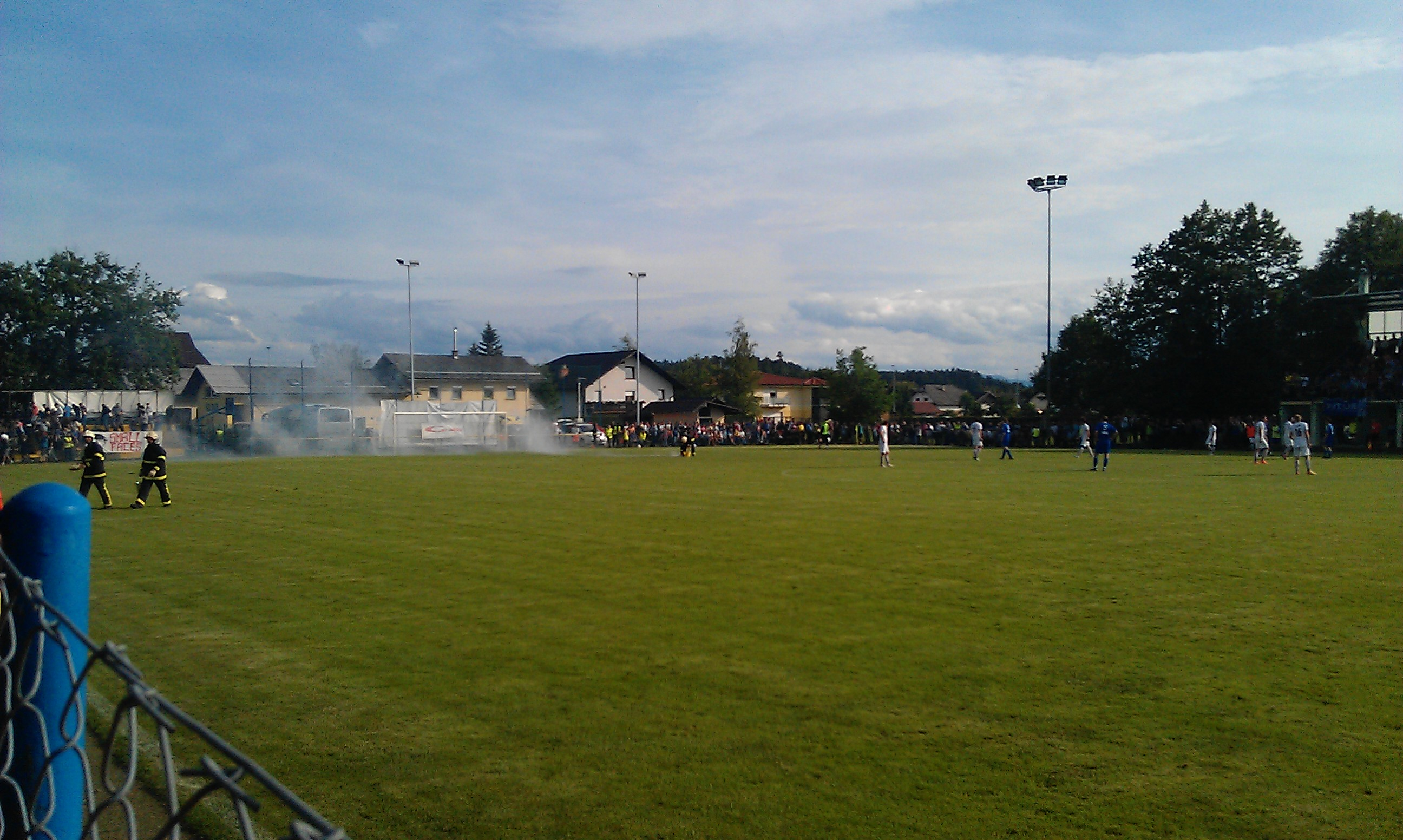
Dob Sports Park

Nogometni klub Dob (English: Dob Football Club) or simply NK Dob, currently named Roltek Dob due to sponsorship reasons, is a Slovenian football club based in Dob that competes in the Slovenian Third League, the third tier of Slovenian football. The club was founded in 1961.

== Stadium ==
Dob plays at the Dob Sports Park (Slovene: Športni park Dob), which is located in Dob. It includes the main stadium with a covered grandstand for 300 spectators, a practice field with a small stand, two fields with natural grass and two fields with artificial turf.

== Honours ==
- Slovenian Second League
  - Winners (1): 2013–14
  - Runners-up (3): 2011–12, 2012–13, 2016–17
- Slovenian Third League
  - Winners (2): 2023–24, 2024–25
  - Runners-up (1): 2009–10
- MNZ Ljubljana Cup
  - Winners (2): 2009–10, 2015–16

== League history since 1991 ==
Season	League	Position
1991–92	MNZ Ljubljana (level 3)	5th
1992–93	MNZ Ljubljana (level 4)	4th
1993–94	MNZ Ljubljana (level 4)	6th
1994–95	MNZ Ljubljana (level 4)	5th
1995–96	MNZ Ljubljana (level 4)	9th
1996–97	MNZ Ljubljana (level 4)	11th
1997–98	MNZ Ljubljana (level 4)	4th
1998–99	3. SNL – Centre	6th
1999–2000	3. SNL – Centre	9th
2000–01	3. SNL – Centre	8th
2001–02	3. SNL – Centre	4th
2002–03	3. SNL – Centre	4th
2003–04	3. SNL – Centre	8th
2004–05	3. SNL – West	5th
2005–06	3. SNL – West	8th
2006–07	3. SNL – West	5th
2007–08	3. SNL – West	12th
2008–09	3. SNL – West	7th
2009–10	3. SNL – West	2nd
2010–11	2. SNL	6th

Season	League	Position
2011–12	2. SNL	2nd (Note: Won in promotion play-offs for the Slovenian PrvaLiga, but did not obtain a licence.)
2012–13	2. SNL	2nd (Note: Declined promotion.)
2013–14	2. SNL	1st
2014–15	2. SNL	3rd
2015–16	2. SNL	5th
2016–17	2. SNL	2nd
2017–18	2. SNL	10th
2018–19	2. SNL	8th
2019–20	2. SNL	9th
2020–21	2. SNL	4th
2021–22	2. SNL	9th
2022–23	2. SNL	16th
2023–24	3. SNL – West	1st
2024–25	3. SNL – West	1st
2025–26	3. SNL – West	3rd
