= FC Drava Ptuj =

Slovenian football club

Drava Ptuj
- Full name: Football Club Drava Ptuj
- Nicknames: Kurenti; Plavi (The Blues)
- Founded: 2004; 22 years ago (as NŠ Drava Ptuj)
- Dissolved: 2025; 1 year ago
- Ground: Ptuj City Stadium
- Capacity: 1,592
Home colours	Away colours

Football Club Drava Ptuj or simply FC Drava Ptuj was a Slovenian football club based in Ptuj. The club was founded in 2004 and was legally not considered the successor to NK Drava Ptuj, which disbanded in 2011, and the statistics and honours of both clubs are kept separate by the Football Association of Slovenia.

After five rounds of the 2025–26 Slovenian Third League season, the club withdrew from the league and ceased all activities.

== Honours ==
- Slovenian Second League
  - Runners-up: 2017–18
- Slovenian Third League
  - Winners: 2023–24
  - Runners-up: 2013–14, 2014–15, 2022–23
- Ptuj Super League (fourth tier)
  - Winners: 2012–13
- MNZ Ptuj Cup
  - Winners: 2014–15, 2016–17, 2017–18, 2019–20

== League history ==
Season	League	Position
2011–12	Styrian League	4th
2012–13	Ptuj Super League	1st
2013–14	3. SNL – East	2nd
2014–15	3. SNL – North	2nd (Note: Won promotion play-offs for the Slovenian Second League.)
2015–16	2. SNL	3rd
2016–17	2. SNL	5th
2017–18	2. SNL	2nd
2018–19	2. SNL	7th
2019–20	2. SNL	11th
2020–21	2. SNL	13th
2021–22	2. SNL	16th
2022–23	3. SNL – East	2nd
2023–24	3. SNL – East	1st
2024–25	2. SNL	16th
2025–26	3. SNL – East	14th (Note: Withdrew after five rounds.)
