= NK Aluminij =

Slovenian football club

Aluminij
- Full name: Nogometni klub Aluminij Kidričevo
- Nicknames: Šumari (The Foresters); Rdeče-beli (The Red and Whites)
- Founded: 1946; 80 years ago
- Ground: Aluminij Sports Park
- Capacity: 789
- President: Robert Koderman
- Head coach: Jura Arsić
- League: Slovenian PrvaLiga
- 2025–26: Slovenian PrvaLiga, 7th of 10
- Website: nkaluminij.net
Home colours	Away colours

Nogometni klub Aluminij (English: Aluminij Football Club), commonly referred to as NK Aluminij or simply Aluminij, is a Slovenian football club based in the town of Kidričevo that competes in the Slovenian PrvaLiga, the top tier of Slovenian football. The club was founded in 1946.

== Players ==
=== Current squad ===
As of 13 September 2026

Note: Flags indicate national team as defined under FIFA eligibility rules; some limited exceptions apply. Players may hold more than one non-FIFA nationality.

No.	Pos.	Nation	Player
1	GK	SLO	Anej Mrežar
3	DF	SLO	Domen Zajšek
4	DF	SLO	Rok Schaubach
5	DF	SLO	Matija Boben
6	DF	CRO	Dino Šimunić
7	MF	SRB	Marko Mladenović
8	MF	SEN	Seyni Babacar Sène
9	FW	SLO	Adriano Bloudek
10	FW	GER	Robert Ramšak
11	FW	NGR	Bede Osuji
12	DF	CRO	Ante Bekavac
13	MF	SLO	Matic Vrbanec
14	MF	CRO	Tomislav Jagić (captain)
18	MF	SLO	Simon Rogina

No.	Pos.	Nation	Player
20	FW	CRO	Ivijan Svržnjak
21	DF	SLO	Lan Drevenšek
23	DF	SLO	Enej Kramberger
24	FW	SLO	Tai Luka Modrić
25	FW	SLO	Murat Bajraj
27	MF	SLO	Maj Blažič
31	GK	SLO	Florijan Raduha
32	DF	CRO	Vito Težak
34	DF	SLO	Miha Schaubach
44	FW	CRO	Petar Petriško
45	FW	GAM	Bamba Susso
66	GK	SLO	Lukas Tomažič
80	DF	FRO	Hanus Sørensen (on loan from Celje)
98	FW	SLO	Jaka Tetičkovič Domjan

== Honours ==
Yugoslavia

- Slovenian Republic League
  - Winners (1): 1965–66
- Slovenian Republic Cup
  - Winners (1): 1965

Slovenia

- Slovenian Second League
  - Winners (3): 2010–11, 2011–12, 2024–25
  - Runners-up (4): 2008–09, 2014–15, 2015–16, 2022–23
- Slovenian Third League (East)
  - Winners (1): 1996–97
  - Runners-up (1): 1993–94
- Slovenian Football Cup
  - Winners (1): 2025–26
  - Runners-up (2): 2001–02, 2017–18
- MNZ Ptuj Cup
  - Winners (11): 1991–92, 1993, 1994–95, 1999–2000, 2000–01, 2001–02, 2002–03, 2004–05, 2008–09, 2009–10, 2013–14

== Season-by-season records ==
Season	League	Position	Pts	P	W	D	L	GF	GA	Cup
1991–92	1. MNZ Ptuj	2	36	22	15	6	1	65	26	Quarter-finals
1992–93	3. SNL – East	12	22	26	8	6	12	35	41	did not qualify
1993–94	3. SNL – East	2	34	26	14	6	6	59	35	First round
1994–95	3. SNL – East	3	33	23	15	3	5	54	30	Round of 16
1995–96	3. SNL – East	4	37	26	10	7	9	41	36	Round of 16
1996–97	3. SNL – East	1↑	62	26	19	5	2	67	18	Quarter-finals
1997–98	2. SNL	13	31	30	8	7	15	34	50	First round
1998–99	2. SNL	6	51	30	14	9	7	57	42	Round of 16
1999–2000	2. SNL	4	55	30	16	7	7	62	32	First round
2000–01	2. SNL	3	60	29	18	6	5	62	29	Round of 16
2001–02	2. SNL	3	71	30	22	5	3	73	22	Runners-up
2002–03	2. SNL	3	57	30	17	6	7	67	37	Quarter-finals
2003–04	2. SNL	5	50	32	14	8	10	50	39	First round
2004–05	2. SNL	7	47	33	14	5	14	68	51	Round of 16
2005–06	2. SNL	4	43	27	12	7	8	37	24	Round of 16
2006–07	2. SNL	6	37	27	10	7	10	29	29	did not qualify
2007–08	2. SNL	4	41	27	12	5	10	39	30	did not qualify
2008–09	2. SNL	2	49	27	15	4	7	65	40	Second round
2009–10	2. SNL	3	46	27	14	4	9	67	34	First round
2010–11	2. SNL	1	48	27	13	9	5	54	22	Round of 16
2011–12	2. SNL	1↑	68	27	21	5	1	54	12	did not qualify
2012–13	1. SNL	10↓	30	36	7	9	20	36	67	Semi-finals
2013–14	2. SNL	3	47	27	13	8	6	45	23	Quarter-finals
2014–15	2. SNL	2	50	27	15	5	7	49	21	First round
2015–16	2. SNL	2↑	50	27	14	8	5	61	29	did not qualify
2016–17	1. SNL	9	38	36	9	11	16	38	52	Quarter-finals
2017–18	1. SNL	8	33	36	8	9	19	40	63	Runners-up
2018–19	1. SNL	6	48	36	14	6	16	50	53	Semi-finals
2019–20	1. SNL	5	55	36	16	7	13	58	48	Semi-finals
2020–21	1. SNL	8	43	36	10	13	13	31	41	Round of 16
2021–22	1. SNL	10↓	24	36	4	12	20	33	72	First round
2022–23	2. SNL	2↑	64	30	19	7	4	58	23	Semi-finals
2023–24	1. SNL	10↓	31	36	8	7	21	37	71	First round
2024–25	2. SNL	1↑	64	30	20	4	6	59	28	Round of 16
2025–26	1. SNL	7	36	34	10	6	18	42	61	Winners

Key

- P – Matches played
- W – Matches won
- D – Matches drawn
- L – Matches lost
- GF – Goals for
- GA – Goals against
- Pts – Points

Winners	Runners-up	Promoted ↑	Relegated ↓

== European record ==
All results (home and away) list Aluminij's goal tally first.

Season	Competition	Round	Opposition	Home	Away	Aggregate
2026–27	UEFA Europa League	1QR	(Moldova) Sheriff Tiraspol	0–1	0–0	0–1
2026–27	UEFA Conference League	2QR	(Albania) Dinamo City	1–1	0–3	1–4
