= NK Šmartno 1928 =

Slovenian football club

Šmartno 1928
- Full name: Nogometni klub Šmartno 1928
- Founded: 2005; 21 years ago
- Ground: Šmartno Stadium
- Capacity: 717
- President: Staš Trop
- Head coach: Alan Hočevar
- League: 3. SNL – East
- 2025–26: 3. SNL – East, 8th of 14
- Website: smartno1928.si
Home colours	Away colours

Nogometni klub Šmartno 1928 (English: Šmartno 1928 Football Club), commonly referred to as NK Šmartno or simply Šmartno, is a Slovenian football club based in Šmartno ob Paki that competes in the Slovenian Third League, the third tier of Slovenian football. The club emerged after the dissolution of NK Šmartno ob Paki, a team that played in the Slovenian top division for several seasons before being dissolved. However, the new club that was founded in 2005 is legally not a successor of the dissolved club.

== Honours ==
- Slovenian Third League
  - Winners: 2009–10
- Slovenian Fourth Division
  - Winners: 2006–07, 2017–18
- Slovenian Fifth Division
  - Winners: 2005–06
- MNZ Celje Cup
  - Winners: 2012–13, 2013–14

== League history ==
Season	League	Position
2005–06	MNZ Celje (level 5)	1st
2006–07	Styrian League (level 4)	1st
2007–08	3. SNL – East	2nd
2008–09	3. SNL – East	5th
2009–10	3. SNL – East	1st
2010–11	2. SNL	10th
2011–12	2. SNL	10th
2012–13	2. SNL	8th
2013–14	2. SNL	6th
2014–15	2. SNL	10th
2015–16	3. SNL – North	12th
2016–17	3. SNL – North	14th
2017–18	MNZ Celje (level 4)	1st
2018–19	3. SNL – North	3rd
2019–20	3. SNL – East	1st
2020–21	2. SNL	15th
2021–22	3. SNL – East	6th
2022–23	3. SNL – East	13th
2023–24	3. SNL – East	12th
2024–25	3. SNL – East	4th
2025–26	3. SNL – East	8th
