= NK Radomlje =

Slovenian football club

Radomlje
- Full name: Nogometni klub Radomlje
- Nicknames: Mlinarji (The Millers); Rumeno-črni (The Yellow and Blacks)
- Founded: 1972; 54 years ago
- Ground: Domžale Sports Park
- Capacity: 3,100
- President: Matjaž Marinšek
- Head coach: Radostin Aleksandrov
- League: Slovenian PrvaLiga
- 2025–26: Slovenian PrvaLiga, 6th of 10
- Website: www.nk-radomlje.si
Home colours	Away colours

Nogometni klub Radomlje (English: Radomlje Football Club) or simply NK Radomlje, currently named Kalcer Radomlje for sponsorship reasons, is a Slovenian football club based in Radomlje that competes in the Slovenian PrvaLiga, the top flight of Slovenian football.

== History ==
Although the settlement of Radomlje had an informal football club formed in 1934 as part of the town's sports club, the club was legally not established until 1972 by a group of local workers. The club competed in the lower regional and amateur leagues in Yugoslavia until the independence of Slovenia in 1991. In the 2014–15 season, Radomlje played in the Slovenian PrvaLiga for the first time in their history.

== Supporters ==
Radomlje supporters are called Mlinarji. The group was formed in April 2009.

== Current squad ==
As of 13 July 2025

Note: Flags indicate national team as defined under FIFA eligibility rules; some limited exceptions apply. Players may hold more than one non-FIFA nationality.

No.	Pos.	Nation	Player
1	GK	SLO	Samo Pridgar
6	MF	BIH	Ognjen Gnjatić
7	FW	SLO	Vid Chinoso Juvančič
9	FW	SLO	Nino Kukovec
10	MF	SLO	Andrej Pogačar
12	GK	SLO	Jakob Kobal
15	MF	SLO	Jaša Martinčič
19	FW	AUT	Aleksandar Vucenovic
22	DF	CRO	Matej Mamić
23	DF	CRO	Nino Vukasović
27	MF	SLO	Dejan Vokić
30	MF	NGR	Moses Barnabas
31	FW	GAM	Halifa Kujabi

No.	Pos.	Nation	Player
33	DF	SLO	Rok Ljutić
41	MF	CRO	Marko Cukon
43	GK	SLO	Tilen Gašper Štiftar
44	DF	SLO	Matej Malenšek
77	DF	SLO	Žan Žaler
97	DF	SLO	Sandro Zukić
99	GK	IND	Som Kumar
—	DF	SLO	Bine Anželj
—	DF	SLO	Enej Klampfer
—	DF	SLO	Amadej Marinič
—	MF	BIH	Hanan Duraković
—	FW	RUS	Stanislav Krapukhin

== Honours ==
- Slovenian Second League
  - Winners: 2015–16, 2020–21
- Slovenian Third League
  - Winners: 2010–11
- Slovenian Fourth Division
  - Winners: 2002–03
- MNZ Ljubljana Cup
  - Winners: 2013–14, 2018–19

== League history since 1991 ==
Season	League	Position
1991–92	MNZ Ljubljana	1st
1992–93	2. SNL	16th
1993–94	3. SNL – West	2nd
1994–95	3. SNL – West	11th
1995–96	MNZ Ljubljana	5th
1996–97	MNZ Ljubljana	7th
1997–98	MNZ Ljubljana	8th
1998–99	MNZ Ljubljana	7th
1999–2000	MNZ Ljubljana	6th
2000–01	MNZ Ljubljana	9th
2001–02	MNZ Ljubljana	4th
2002–03	MNZ Ljubljana	1st
2003–04	3. SNL – Centre	7th
2004–05	3. SNL – West	2nd
2005–06	3. SNL – West	7th
2006–07	3. SNL – West	2nd
2007–08	3. SNL – West	8th
2008–09	3. SNL – West	3rd
2009–10	3. SNL – West	4th
2010–11	3. SNL – West	1st

Season	League	Position
2011–12	2. SNL	5th
2012–13	2. SNL	5th
2013–14	2. SNL	2nd
2014–15	1. SNL	10th
2015–16	2. SNL	1st
2016–17	1. SNL	10th
2017–18	2. SNL	4th
2018–19	2. SNL	3rd
2019–20	2. SNL	3rd
2020–21	2. SNL	1st
2021–22	1. SNL	6th
2022–23	1. SNL	7th
2023–24	1. SNL	9th
2024–25	1. SNL	8th
2025–26	1. SNL	6th

== See also ==
- ŽNK Radomlje, women's team
