= NK Krško Posavje =

Association football club in Slovenia

Krško Posavje
- Full name: Nogometni klub Krško Posavje
- Nicknames: Nuklearci (The Nuclear Boys); Zeleni (The Greens)
- Founded: 11 May 1922; 104 years ago
- Ground: Matija Gubec Stadium
- Capacity: 1,470
- President: Jože Tomažin
- Head coach: Adnan Zildžović
- League: Slovenian Second League
- 2025–26: Slovenian Second League, 14th of 16
- Website: nkkrskoposavje.si
| Home colours | Away colours |

Nogometni klub Krško Posavje (English: Krško Posavje Football Club), commonly referred to as NK Krško Posavje or simply Krško Posavje, is a Slovenian football club from Krško that competes in the Slovenian Second League, the second tier of Slovenian football. The club was founded in 1922. Their home ground is the Matija Gubec Stadium with a capacity to accommodate 1,470 spectators.

In 2023, the club merged with NK Posavje Krško and was renamed NK Krško Posavje.

== Honours ==
First team

- Slovenian Second League
  - Winners (1): 2014–15
- Slovenian Third League
  - Winners (2): 2001–02, 2024–25
- Slovenian Fourth Division
  - Winners (1): 1998–99
- MNZ Celje Cup
  - Winners (5): 2001–02, 2002–03, 2005–06, 2009–10, 2010–11

Reserve team

- Slovenian Fifth Division
  - Winners (2): 2010–11, 2012–13

== League history since 1991 ==
| Season | League | Position |
|---|---|---|
| 1991–92 | MNZ Celje (level 3) | 3rd |
| 1992–93 | MNZ Celje (level 4) | 10th |
| 1993–94 | / | |
| 1994–95 | MNZ Celje (level 4) | 4th |
| 1995–96 | MNZ Celje (level 4) | 2nd |
| 1996–97 | MNZ Celje (level 4) | 2nd |
| 1997–98 | MNZ Celje (level 4) | 5th |
| 1998–99 | MNZ Celje (level 4) | 1st |
| 1999–2000 | 3. SNL – North | 7th |
| 2000–01 | 3. SNL – North | 5th |
| 2001–02 | 3. SNL – North | 1st |
| 2002–03 | 2. SNL | 13th |
| 2003–04 | 2. SNL | 7th |
| 2004–05 | 2. SNL | 10th |
| 2005–06 | 2. SNL | 5th |
| 2006–07 | 2. SNL | 3rd |
| 2007–08 | 2. SNL | 6th |
| 2008–09 | 2. SNL | 6th |

| Season | League | Position |
|---|---|---|
| 2009–10 | 2. SNL | 8th |
| 2010–11 | 2. SNL | 8th |
| 2011–12 | 2. SNL | 6th |
| 2012–13 | 2. SNL | 4th |
| 2013–14 | 2. SNL | 7th |
| 2014–15 | 2. SNL | 1st |
| 2015–16 | 1. SNL | 6th |
| 2016–17 | 1. SNL | 8th |
| 2017–18 | 1. SNL | 7th |
| 2018–19 | 1. SNL | 10th |
| 2019–20 | 2. SNL | 6th |
| 2020–21 | 2. SNL | 10th |
| 2021–22 | 2. SNL | 14th |
| 2022–23 | 2. SNL | 15th |
| 2023–24 | 3. SNL – East | 2nd |
| 2024–25 | 3. SNL – East | 1st |
| 2025–26 | 2. SNL | 14th |
