= NK Fužinar =

Slovenian football club

Fužinar
- Full name: Koroški nogometni klub Fužinar
- Founded: 1937; 89 years ago
- Ground: Ravne City Stadium
- Capacity: 500
- President: Peter Stočko
- Head coach: Mihael Bukovec
- League: 3. SNL – East
- 2025–26: 3. SNL – East, 5th of 14
- Website: www.knkfuzinar.si
Home colours

Nogometni klub Fužinar (English: Fužinar Football Club), commonly referred to as NK Fužinar or simply Fužinar, is a Slovenian football club from Ravne na Koroškem which plays in the Slovenian Third League, the third tier of Slovenian football. The club was founded in 1937.

== History ==
The club was founded in August 1937 as SK Slovan Guštanj. In the 1939–40 season, they joined the subassociation competitions and won the Carinthian second-tier group ahead of their neighbors SK Mislinja. The following year, they played in the Maribor League – West, but the season was interrupted due to the outbreak of World War II in Yugoslavia. After the war, they first competed as the football section of Partizan Guštanj, and then founded ŠD Fužinar in 1947. They again played in Maribor subassociation leagues until 1950, when they qualified for the second division in Slovenia. Fužinar finished dead last and immediately returned to the local level.

They achieved their biggest success during the Yugoslav era in the 1965–66 season, when they played in the newly established Slovenian Zonal League – East at the new stadium and took second place. Therefore, they played in the qualifiers for the Slovenian Republic League against Svoboda, but lost 6–4 on aggregate. Fužinar remained in the zonal and regional leagues until 1988, but never came close to promotion. During the 1979–80 season, an attempt was made to unite all clubs from Carinthia under the name Koroška, but the short-lived project was unsuccessful.

After Slovenia's independence in 1991, they found themselves in the lowest possible league and the club was reorganized as KNK Fužinar in the mid-1990s. They qualified for the Slovenian Third League in 1999, but were soon relegated again. Their rise began in 2012, when former top division player Niko Podvinski joined the club as player/manager, and the club was promoted from the fifth to the third league in two years. In 2017, they took third place, but the champions Maribor B declined promotion, so Fužinar was promoted to the Slovenian Second League for the first time in the club's history.

== Honours ==
- Slovenian Fourth Division
  - Winners: 1998–99, 2001–02, 2013–14
- Slovenian Fifth Division
  - Winners: 2012–13
- Slovenian Sixth Division
  - Winners: 2010–11
- MNZ Maribor Cup
  - Winners: 2014–15
