= Aluminij Sports Park =

Stadium in Kidričevo, Slovenia

- Interactive map of Aluminij Sports Park
- Full name: Športni park Aluminij
- Location: Kidričevo, Slovenia
- Coordinates: 46°24′28″N 15°47′23″E
- Capacity: 789
- Surface: Grass
- Field size: 105 by 68 metres (115 by 74 yards)

Construction
- Opened: 1950
- Renovated: 1998, 2017
- Expanded: 2023

Tenant
- NK Aluminij (1950–present)

Aluminij Sports Park (Slovene: Športni park Aluminij) is a multi-purpose stadium in Kidričevo, Slovenia. It is used mostly for football matches and is the home ground of Slovenian PrvaLiga team NK Aluminij.

During the 2016–17 season, the stadium underwent major reconstruction. The old stand was demolished and replaced with a new one with a capacity of 532 covered seats. In 2023, the stadium was expanded with a further seats installed next to the main stand, bringing the total capacity of the stadium to 789 seats.
