= Šenčur =

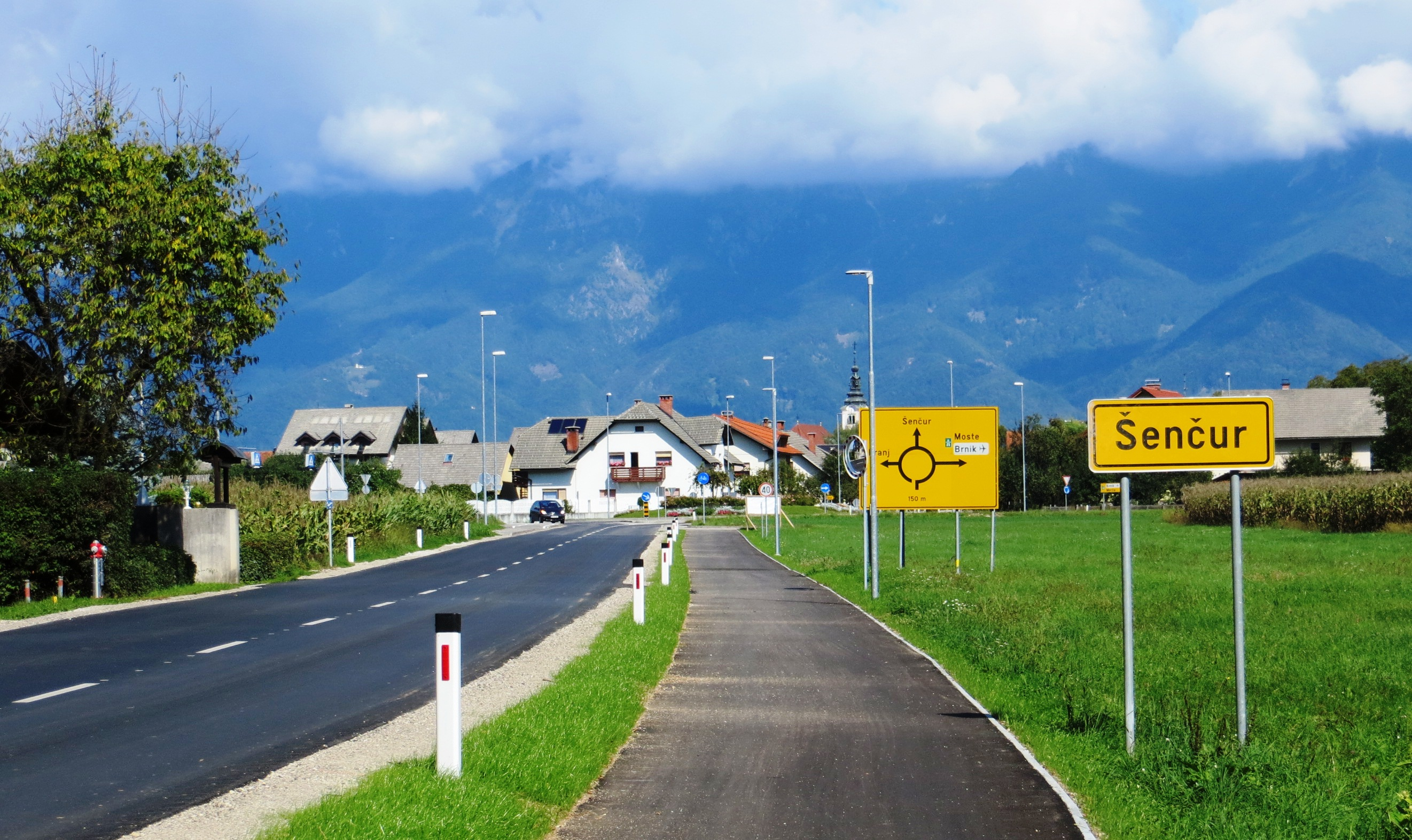

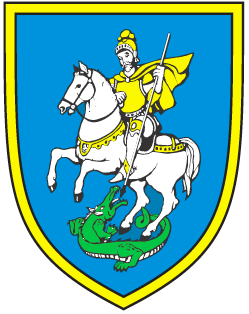
- Coat of arms

- Location in Slovenia
- Coordinates: 46°14′34.94″N 14°25′5.19″E
- Country: Slovenia
- Traditional Region: Upper Carniola
- Statistical region: Upper Carniola
- Municipality: Šenčur

Area
  - Total: 9.8 km^{2} (3.8 sq mi)
- Elevation: 402.5 m (1,321 ft)

Population (2012)
  - Total: 3,121

Šenčur (pronounced [ʃɛnˈtʃuːɾ]; in older sources also Šentjur, German: Sankt Georgen or Sankt Georgen im Felde) is a settlement in the Upper Carniola region of Slovenia. It is the seat of the Municipality of Šenčur.

== Name ==
Šenčur was mentioned in written sources in 1221 as de Sancto Georio (and as ad sanctum Georium and ecclesiam sancti Georgii in 1238, and as aput Sanctum Georium in 1264). The Slovene name Šentčur is a contraction of the colloquial name for Saint George, the patron saint of the local church: šent Jur > *Šenťur > Šenčur. In the past, the settlement was known as Sankt Georgen (im Felde) in German.

== History ==
The Šenčur area was already inhabited in late antiquity; archaeological finds include a Roman sarcophagus from the 4th century AD. Medieval sources mention Šenčur in 1221 in connection with the knight Friedrich of Šenčur (Fridericus de Sancto Georio).

During the Middle Ages, Šenčur was subordinate to the Dominican monastery in Velesovo. In 1458, almost half of the peasants (21) were subordinated to the monastery. In 1471 and 1472, the settlement came under Ottoman attack twice. With the abolition of the monastery in 1782, most of the peasants came under different landlords.

Šenčur was the scene of the Šenčur Events (Slovene: Šenčurski dogodki) on 22 May 1932. This was a political incident in which members of the banned Slovene People's Party prevented a march by the newly founded Yugoslav Radical Peasants' Democracy, calling out slogans against the 6 January Dictatorship and in support of the United Slovenia program. As a result, several Upper Carniolan leaders of the Slovene People's Party were arrested and imprisoned, including Matija Škerbec.

During the Second World War, a local committee of the communist Liberation Front was established in Šenčur in May 1941. On 24 January 1944, German forces shot 40 hostages in Šenčur in retaliation for the deaths of three military police.

After the Second World War, the old medieval layout of Šenčur was almost completely obliterated by new development. The population, which had already grown significantly during the interwar period, grew rapidly after 1945, even doubling between 1953 and 1994. By the end of the 20th century, only 5% of the population was still engaged in farming and the majority of residents commuted to Kranj for work.

== Church ==
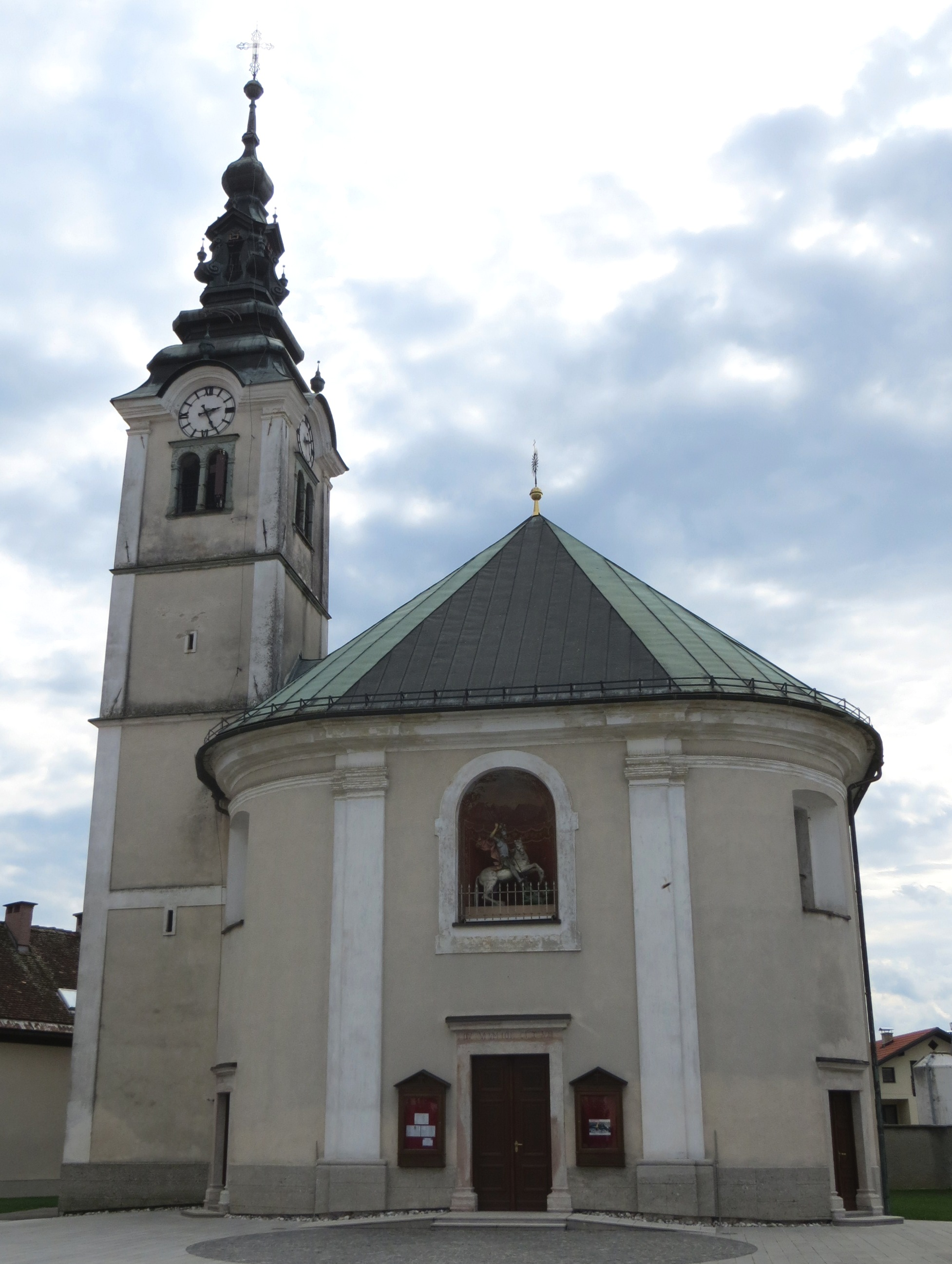
View from north

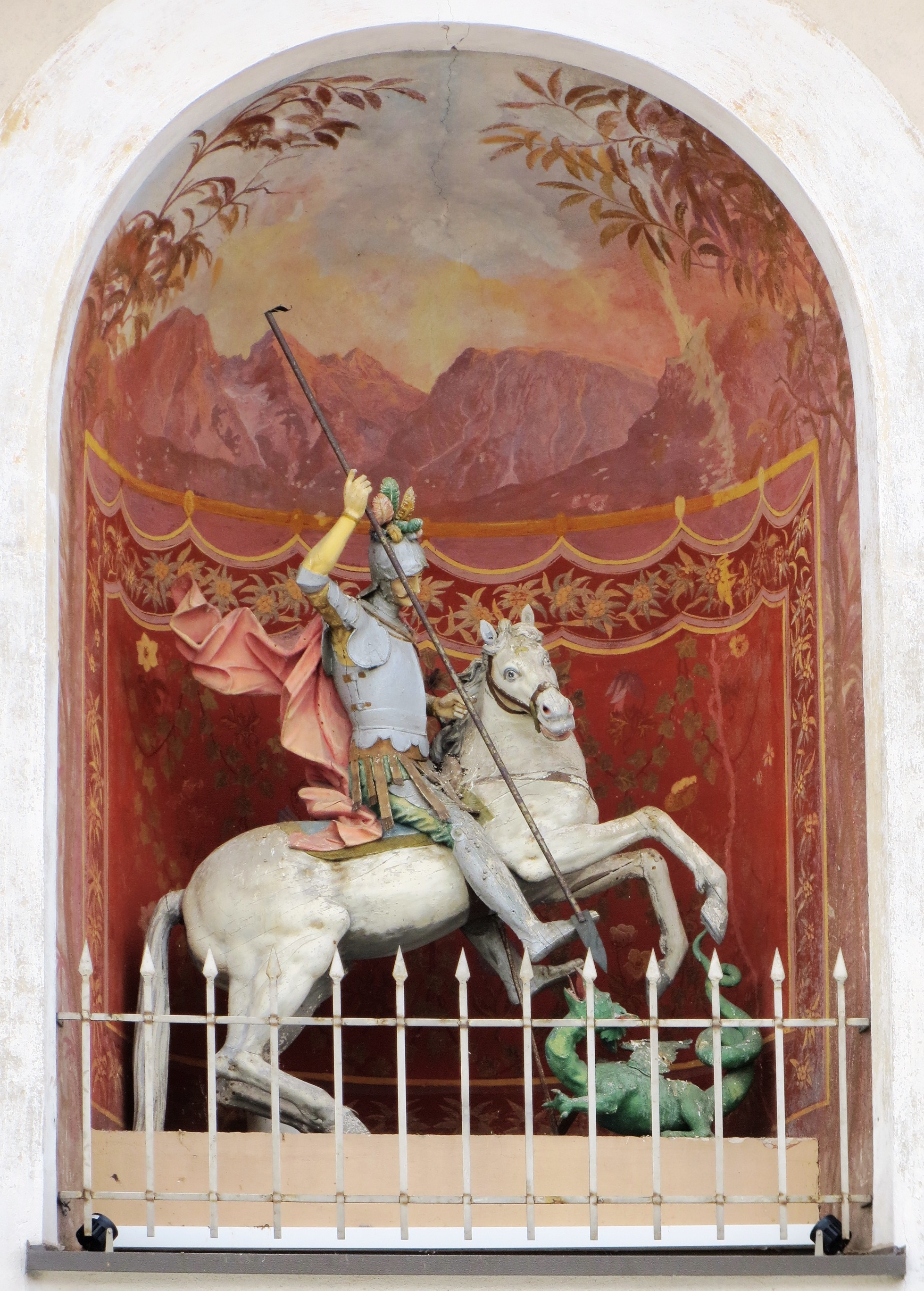
Sculpture in niche

St. George's Church

The church in Šenčur is dedicated to Saint George (Slovene: sveti Jurij). It is a single-nave structure with a rectangular chancel with beveled corners that was built in 1747 on the site of an earlier building. The furnishings are Baroque, and the chancel arch features a 1750 fresco painted by Franc Jelovšek (1700–1764). The church also contains paintings by Janez (1850–1889) and Jurij Šubic (1855–1890). The first church at the site was mentioned in written sources in 1238, when Patriarch Berthold of Aquileia granted the church to the monastery at Velesovo. During the Middle Ages, the church was surrounded with a fortified wall to protect against Ottoman attacks.

== Economy ==
Šenčur has several small family-owned companies. A business park was built in 1994. A well-known local company is Logar Trade d.o.o., which produces beekeeping equipment for export to German-speaking markets. Several international companies also run Slovenian operations from the business park, most notably Garmin. Logistics companies have established themselves in Šenčur due to its convenient location (next to the freeway, 3 km from the airport, and 4 km from Kranj). Šenčur also has four banks, a post office, a supermarket, several other stores, and several bars and restaurants.

== Events ==
Šenčur has three prominent annual events. The oldest and biggest carnival in Upper Carniola takes place in the town each year in February or March. The carnival is organized by the Godlarji association (named for the traditional dish godlja, a blood-sausage soup, which has also yielded the nickname godlarji for the residents). The second event is the Potato Festival, which is held each year at the end of June. The third event is the Grand Prix of Šenčur international cycling race, which is held annually at the beginning of April.

=== Šenčur Sports Park ===
Šenčur Sports Park
- Interactive map of Šenčur Sports Park
- Full name: Športni park Šenčur
- Location: Šenčur
- Capacity: 540
- Surface: Grass

Tenant
- NK Šenčur

Šenčur Sports Park is a multi-purpose stadium in Šenčur. It is used for football matches and is the home ground of the Slovenian Third League team NK Šenčur. The stadium currently holds 800 spectators, 540 of them can be seated.

== Associations ==
There are several associations and clubs in the town. The association with the longest tradition is the volunteer fire department, going back more than 115 years. There are several folkdance groups, a band, and several choral groups. A theater group performs a few shows per year at the local community center. The town also has several sports teams. The NK Šenčur football team has played in the Slovenian Second League for several years, and KK Šenčur plays in the Premier A Slovenian Basketball League. The Šenčur archery club is very active, and the Šenčur cycling club organizes the annual cycling race. Other local associations include the beekeepers' association and the tourism association.

== Notable people ==
Notable people that were born or lived in Šenčur include:

- Janez Bohinc (1828–1911), poet and writer
- Franc Bricelj (1904–1981), composer
- Vitomir Fedor Jelenc (1885–1922), journalist and writer
- Luka Martinak (1798–1850), activist in the Slovene national awakening
- Anton Sever (1886–1965), medal maker and sculptor
