= NK Šenčur =

Slovenian football club

Šenčur
- Full name: Nogometni klub Šenčur
- Nickname: Godlarji
- Founded: 1951; 75 years ago
- Ground: Šenčur Sports Park
- Capacity: 540
- President: Bojan Pintar
- Head coach: Dejan Nišandžić
- League: 3. SNL – West
- 2025–26: 3. SNL – West, 2nd of 14
- Website: www.sportnodrustvo-sencur.si
Home colours	Away colours

Nogometni klub Šenčur (English: Šenčur Football Club), commonly referred to as NK Šenčur or simply Šenčur, is a Slovenian football club based in Šenčur that competes in the Slovenian Third League, the third tier of Slovenian football. The club was founded in 1951.

== Honours ==
- Slovenian Third League
  - Winners: 2004–05, 2008–09
- MNZG-Kranj Cup
  - Winners: 2007–08, 2010–11, 2011–12, 2012–13, 2013–14
