= Ptuj City Stadium =

Multi-use stadium in Ptuj, Slovenia

- Interactive map of Ptuj City Stadium
- Full name: Mestni stadion Ptuj
- Location: Ptuj, Slovenia
- Coordinates: 46°25′00″N 15°52′32″E
- Operator: Zavod za šport Ptuj
- Capacity: 1,592
- Surface: Grass

Construction
- Opened: 1954
- Renovated: 2005

Tenants
- NK Drava Ptuj (1954–2011); NŠ / FC Drava Ptuj (2011–2025); ŠD NŠ Drava Ptuj (2026–present)

Ptuj City Stadium (Slovene: Mestni stadion Ptuj) is a multi-use stadium in Ptuj, Slovenia. It is currently used mostly for football matches. The stadium has a capacity of 1,592 seats.

== See also ==
- List of football stadiums in Slovenia
