= Matija Gubec Stadium =

Multi-purpose stadium in Slovenia

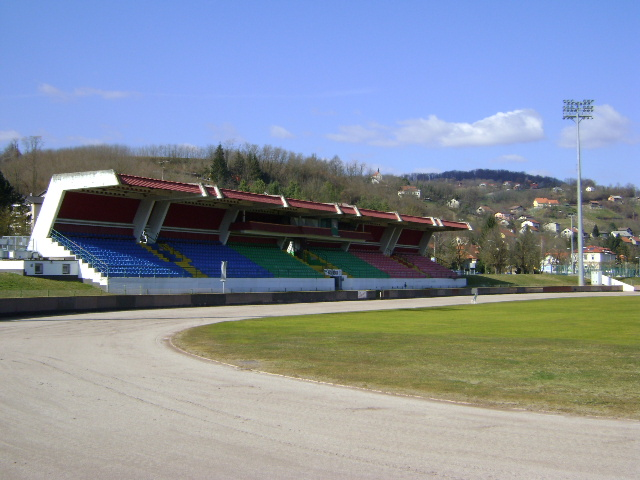
- Interactive map of Matija Gubec Stadium
- Full name: Stadion Matije Gubca
- Location: Krško, Slovenia
- Coordinates: 45°56′55″N 15°29′17″E
- Owner: Municipality of Krško
- Operator: Municipality of Krško
- Capacity: 1,470
- Surface: Grass

Construction
- Built: 1946
- Renovated: 1970s, 2009

Tenant
- Krško Posavje

Matija Gubec Stadium (Slovene: Stadion Matije Gubca) is a multi-purpose stadium in Krško, Slovenia. It is currently used mostly for football matches and is the home ground of local club Krško Posavje. It has a capacity of 1,470 seats. During speedway competitions the standing area surrounding the track is opened for public and therefore the race can be viewed by more than 10,000 spectators.

== History ==
The stadium was built in 1946 and has hosted motorcycle speedway competitions since 1957. It staged the final of the 1980 Speedway World Pairs Championship.

When the stadium hosted the 2018 Speedway Grand Prix of Slovenia, the track was measured at 387.7 metres.

From 2002 until 2019, the stadium was selected as a venue for one of the rounds of the Speedway Grand Prix, which is the sport's World Championship. The Speedway Grand Prix of Slovenia was held 14 times in total at the stadium.

== See also ==
- List of football stadiums in Slovenia
