= Dob, Domžale =

Dob
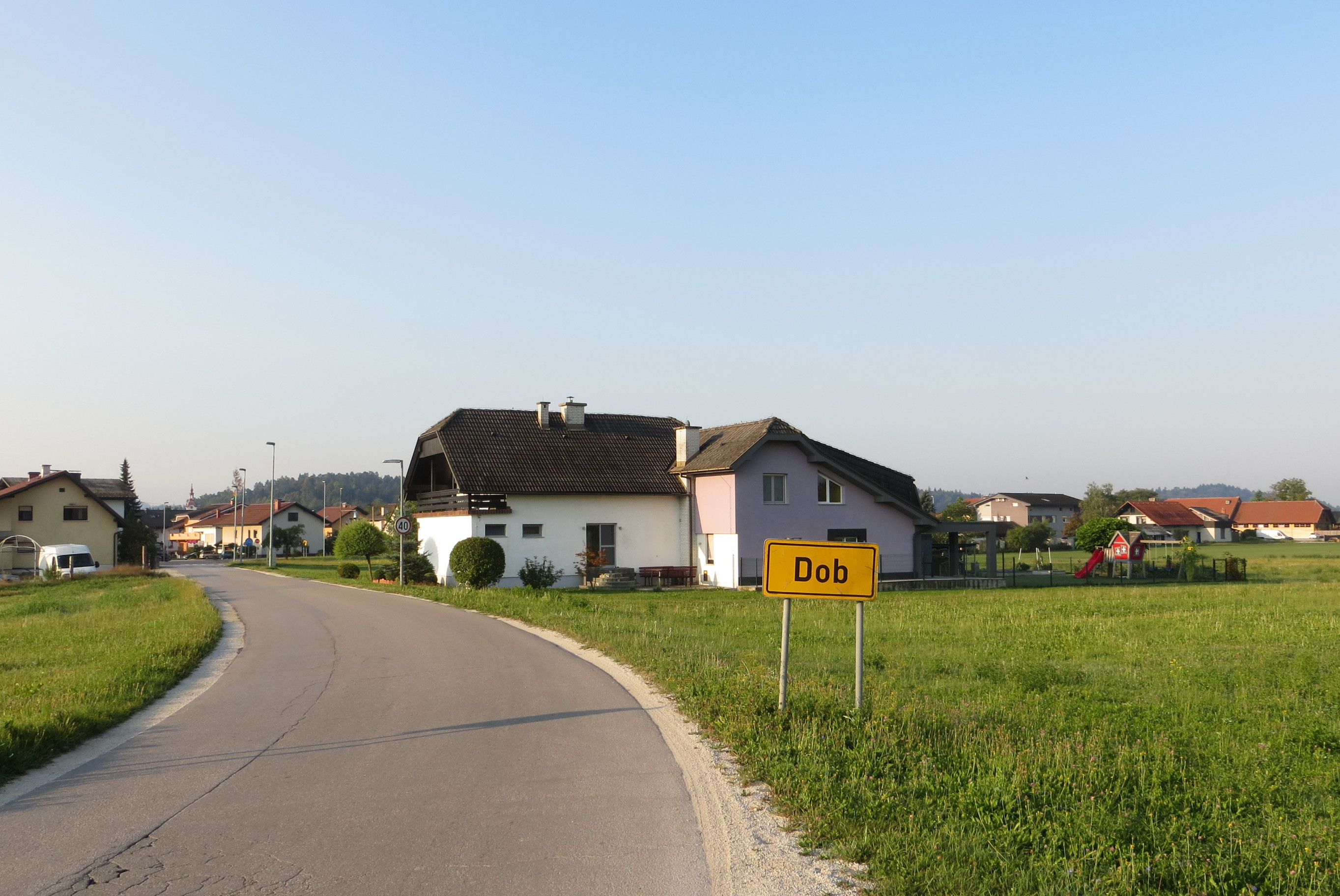

- Location in Slovenia
- Coordinates: 46°9′14.96″N 14°37′40.94″E
- Country: Slovenia
- Traditional region: Upper Carniola
- Statistical region: Central Slovenia
- Municipality: Domžale
- Elevation: 308.6 m (1,012 ft)

Population (2020)
  - Total: 1,638

Dob (pronounced [ˈdoːp]; German: Aich) is a village in the Municipality of Domžale in the Upper Carniola region of Slovenia. The settlement used to be part of the Krumperk lordship.

== Sports ==
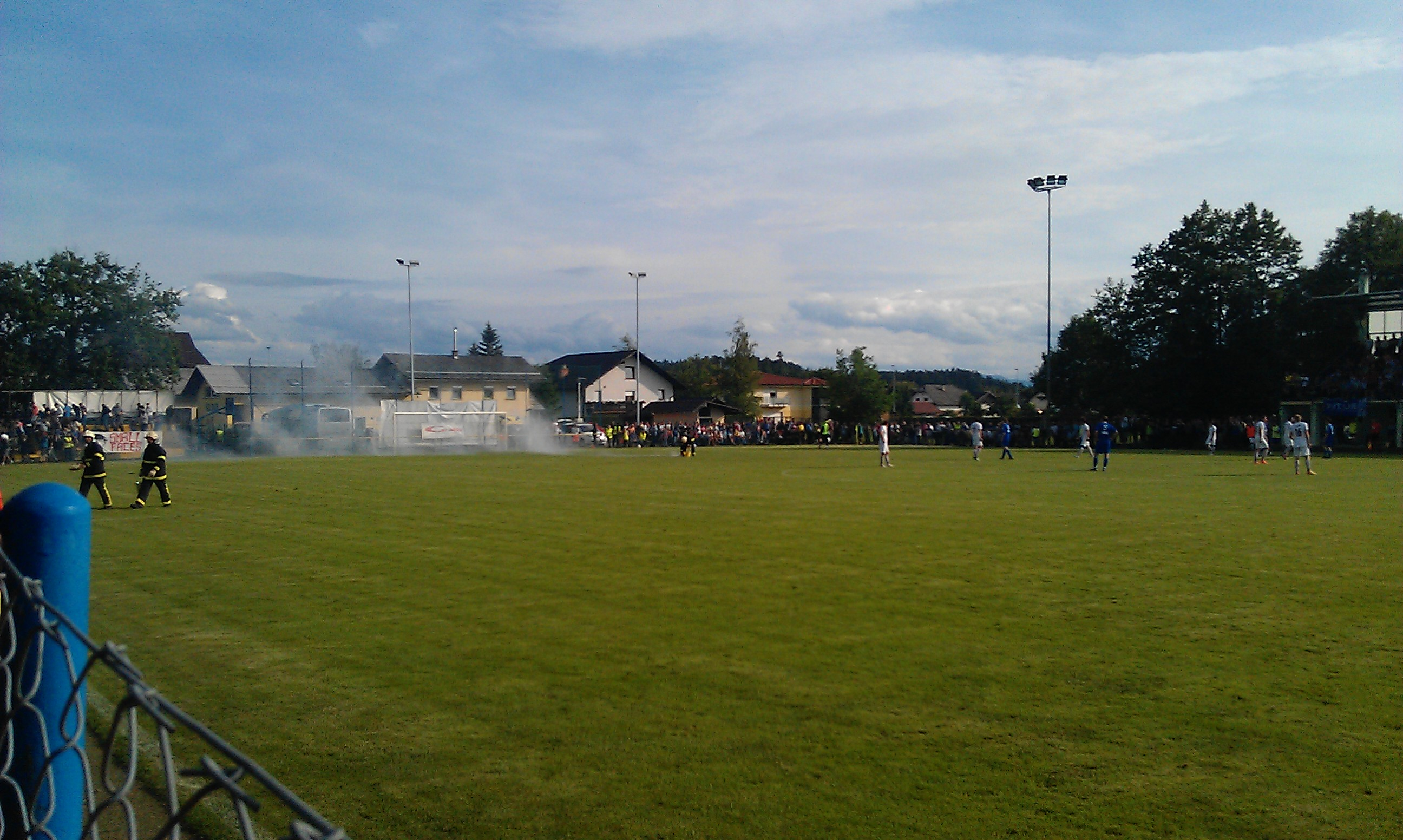
Dob Sports Park

The association football club NK Dob (Nogometni klub Dob) is based in Dob.

== Church ==
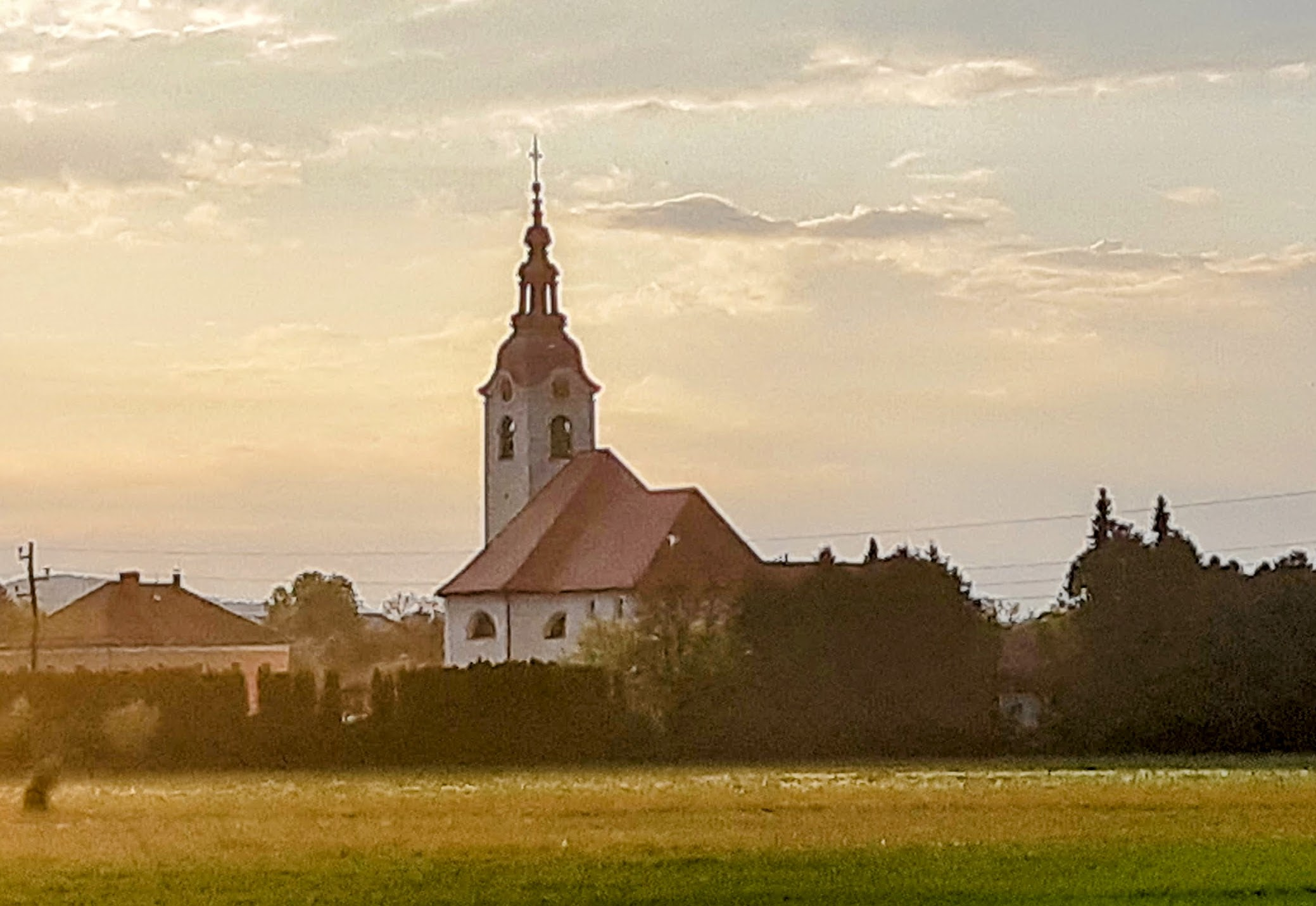
St. Martin's Parish Church

The parish church is dedicated to Saint Martin of Tours. It is a Baroque church built in the 18th century, and it replaced an older Gothic church. The baptistery from 1957 was the last work of the architect Jože Plečnik.
