= 2023–24 Slovenian Second League =

Slovenian Second League
- Season: 2023–24
- Champions: Primorje
- Promoted: Primorje; Nafta 1903
- Relegated: Fužinar
- Matches played: 240
- Goals scored: 661 (2.75 per match)
- Top goalscorer: Toni Lun Bončina (17 goals)

The 2023–24 Slovenian Second League season was the 33rd edition of the Slovenian Second League. The season began on 28 July 2023 and ended on 19 May 2024.

== Competition format ==
Each team played a total of 30 matches (15 home and 15 away). Teams played two matches against each other (1 home and 1 away).

== Teams ==
Location of teams in the 2023–24 Slovenian Second League

Club	Location	Stadium	Capacity
Beltinci	Beltinci	Beltinci Sports Park	1,346
Bilje	Bilje	Stadion V dolinci	300
Bistrica	Slovenska Bistrica	Slovenska Bistrica Sports Park	964
Brinje Grosuplje	Grosuplje	Brinje Stadium	489
Dravinja	Slovenske Konjice	Dobrava Stadium	1,200
Fužinar	Ravne na Koroškem	Ravne City Stadium	500
Gorica	Nova Gorica	Nova Gorica Sports Park	3,100
Ilirija 1911	Ljubljana	Ilirija Sports Park	1,000
Jadran Dekani	Dekani	Dekani Sports Park	400
Krka	Novo Mesto	Portoval	760
Nafta 1903	Lendava	Lendava Sports Park	2,000
Primorje	Ajdovščina	Ajdovščina Stadium	1,630
Rudar Velenje	Velenje	Ob Jezeru City Stadium	1,864
Tabor Sežana	Sežana	Rajko Štolfa Stadium	1,310
Tolmin	Tolmin	Brajda Sports Park	500
Triglav Kranj	Kranj	Stanko Mlakar Stadium	2,060

== League table ==
=== Standings ===
Pos	Team	Pld	W	D	L	GF	GA	GD	Pts	Promotion, qualification or relegation
1	Primorje (C, P)	30	17	9	4	49	25	+24	60	Promotion to Slovenian PrvaLiga
2	Nafta 1903 (P)	30	18	4	8	55	31	+24	58	Promotion to Slovenian PrvaLiga
3	Beltinci	30	17	5	8	49	24	+25	56	
4	Gorica	30	15	8	7	51	28	+23	53	
5	Brinje Grosuplje	30	15	7	8	52	35	+17	52	
6	Triglav Kranj	30	14	6	10	44	35	+9	48	
7	Bistrica	30	13	5	12	45	46	−1	44	
8	Rudar Velenje	30	10	7	13	33	49	−16	37	
9	Jadran Dekani	30	9	9	12	34	37	−3	36	
10	Bilje	30	9	7	14	44	51	−7	34	
11	Dravinja	30	9	7	14	29	42	−13	34	
12	Tolmin	30	8	10	12	34	45	−11	34	
13	Krka	30	9	6	15	40	49	−9	33	
14	Ilirija 1911	30	7	9	14	31	44	−13	30	
15	Tabor Sežana	30	7	9	14	38	59	−21	30	
16	Fužinar (R)	30	6	6	18	33	61	−28	24	Relegation to Slovenian Third League

Source: RSSSF
Rules for classification: 1) points; 2) points in head-to-head matches; 3) goal difference in head-to-head matches; 4) away goals scored in head-to-head matches; 5) total goal difference; 6) total goals scored; 7) away goals scored in all matches; 8) fair-play; 9) draw
(C) Champions; (P) Promoted; (R) Relegated

== Results ==
Home \ Away	BEL	BIL	BIS	BRI	DRA	FUŽ	GOR	ILI	JAD	KRK	NAF	PRI	RUD	TAB	TOL	TRI
Beltinci		2–1	3–0	1–1	3–0	6–2	1–0	1–2	1–0	0–1	1–1	1–1	1–0	2–0	3–1	1–2
Bilje	0–0		3–0	1–5	0–0	5–1	0–1	3–2	2–2	0–2	0–2	1–3	2–2	1–1	2–1	1–1
Bistrica	1–0	4–3		4–1	3–0	2–4	1–5	1–0	1–0	3–0	1–0	1–1	5–1	1–0	0–1	1–3
Brinje	2–1	1–3	1–1		1–2	2–0	1–0	1–1	2–1	2–1	1–3	1–0	0–2	4–1	1–0	0–1
Dravinja	0–2	0–1	3–1	0–4		0–0	0–1	0–0	0–1	3–0	0–1	0–0	0–0	5–2	1–1	2–1
Fužinar	0–1	3–1	1–1	0–4	1–2		0–2	3–2	0–3	1–1	0–4	2–0	4–2	1–2	0–0	0–2
Gorica	1–3	3–2	1–0	1–1	3–0	2–1		4–1	1–1	2–0	3–4	2–3	2–0	1–1	2–3	0–0
Ilirija 1911	0–0	0–3	0–2	4–0	1–3	3–1	0–4		1–0	1–1	2–1	0–0	0–2	2–0	1–1	1–2
Jadran	0–3	2–2	1–4	1–1	0–1	1–2	0–0	0–0		3–2	2–0	1–1	4–1	0–1	0–0	3–1
Krka	0–2	1–0	1–2	0–0	2–1	0–0	1–2	1–1	0–1		1–2	2–3	4–5	0–5	2–2	3–1
Nafta 1903	1–0	3–1	3–1	3–4	0–2	2–0	1–3	2–0	1–0	4–2		2–0	0–0	0–0	3–0	0–0
Primorje	3–1	3–1	2–2	1–1	2–1	1–0	1–0	3–0	4–1	2–1	3–0		3–1	2–1	1–0	4–0
Rudar	0–1	1–2	0–0	2–0	1–0	3–1	0–0	2–1	1–0	0–5	1–5	0–1		1–0	3–1	0–2
Tabor	1–5	3–1	2–0	0–6	3–1	4–4	2–2	0–3	1–2	0–2	0–4	0–0	1–1		2–2	2–2
Tolmin	1–2	0–2	4–1	0–3	1–1	1–0	0–0	3–2	2–2	1–3	2–1	0–0	3–0	3–1		0–4
Triglav	2–1	2–0	2–1	0–1	6–1	2–1	0–3	0–0	1–2	0–1	1–2	2–1	1–1	1–2	2–0	

Source: NZS
Legend: Blue = home team win; Yellow = draw; Red = away team win.

== Season statistics ==
=== Top goalscorers ===
Rank	Player	Team	Goals
1	(Slovenia) Toni Lun Bončina	Nafta 1903	17
2	(Andorra) Ricard Fernández	Krka/Bilje	15
3	(Croatia) Stjepan Oštrek	Nafta 1903	14
4	(Bosnia and Herzegovina) Ismir Nadarević	Krka/Ilirija 1911	11
4	(Slovenia) Lan Piskule	Brinje	11
4	(Slovenia) Jaša Martinčič	Bistrica	11
7	(Slovenia) Franci Perko	Bilje	10
7	(Slovenia) Adriano Bloudek	Rudar	10
7	(Slovenia) Tihomir Maksimović	Krka	10
7	(Slovenia) Luka Baruca	Gorica	10

Source: NZS

== See also ==
- 2023–24 Slovenian PrvaLiga
