= 2024–25 Slovenian Second League =

Slovenian Second League
- Season: 2024–25
- Champions: Aluminij
- Promoted: Aluminij
- Relegated: Tolmin; Drava Ptuj
- Matches: 240
- Goals: 675 (2.81 per match)
- Top goalscorer: Stanislav Krapukhin (19 goals)

The 2024–25 Slovenian Second League season was the 34th edition of the Slovenian Second League. The season began on 9 August 2024 and ended on 25 May 2025.

== Competition format ==
Each team played a total of 30 matches (15 home and 15 away). Teams played two matches against each other (1 home and 1 away).

== Teams ==
Location of teams in the 2024–25 Slovenian Second League

Club	Location	Stadium	Capacity
Aluminij	Kidričevo	Aluminij Sports Park	789
Beltinci	Beltinci	Beltinci Sports Park	1,346
Bilje	Bilje	Stadion V dolinci	300
Bistrica	Slovenska Bistrica	Slovenska Bistrica Sports Park	964
Brinje Grosuplje	Grosuplje	Brinje Grosuplje Sports Centre	492
Drava Ptuj	Ptuj	Ptuj City Stadium	1,592
Dravinja	Slovenske Konjice	Dobrava Stadium	
Gorica	Nova Gorica	Nova Gorica Sports Park	3,100
Ilirija 1911	Ljubljana	Ilirija Sports Park	1,000
Jadran Dekani	Dekani	Dekani Sports Park	400
Krka	Novo Mesto	Portoval	760
Rudar Velenje	Velenje	Ob Jezeru City Stadium	1,864
Slovan	Ljubljana	Kodeljevo Sports Park	
Tabor Sežana	Sežana	Rajko Štolfa Stadium	1,310
Tolmin	Tolmin	Brajda Sports Park	500
Triglav Kranj	Kranj	Stanko Mlakar Stadium	2,060

== League table ==
=== Standings ===
Pos	Team	Pld	W	D	L	GF	GA	GD	Pts	Promotion, qualification or relegation
1	Aluminij (C, P)	30	20	4	6	59	28	+31	64	Promotion to Slovenian PrvaLiga
2	Triglav Kranj	30	20	3	7	72	33	+39	63	Qualification to promotion play-off
3	Gorica	30	17	8	5	60	34	+26	59	
4	Brinje Grosuplje	30	16	7	7	58	31	+27	55	
5	Tabor Sežana	30	14	12	4	57	35	+22	54	
6	Bistrica	30	13	12	5	60	38	+22	51	
7	Dravinja	30	13	6	11	37	36	+1	45	
8	Krka	30	10	8	12	28	32	−4	38	
9	Slovan	30	8	9	13	34	39	−5	33	
10	Beltinci	30	9	6	15	40	48	−8	33	
11	Bilje	30	8	9	13	35	45	−10	33	
12	Jadran Dekani	30	9	5	16	32	56	−24	32	
13	Rudar Velenje	30	7	11	12	27	44	−17	32	
14	Ilirija 1911	30	5	11	14	28	49	−21	26	
15	Tolmin (R)	30	6	4	20	26	62	−36	22	Relegation to Slovenian Third League
16	Drava Ptuj (R)	30	5	5	20	22	65	−43	20	Relegation to Slovenian Third League

Source: NZS
Rules for classification: 1) points; 2) points in head-to-head matches; 3) goal difference in head-to-head matches; 4) away goals scored in head-to-head matches; 5) total goal difference; 6) total goals scored; 7) away goals scored in all matches; 8) fair-play; 9) draw
(C) Champions; (P) Promoted; (R) Relegated

== Results ==
Home \ Away	ALU	BEL	BIL	BIS	BRI	DRP	DRA	GOR	ILI	JAD	KRK	RUD	SLO	TAB	TOL	TRI
Aluminij		2–1	3–0	2–1	4–2	1–0	2–1	0–0	3–1	1–1	2–1	2–0	2–0	1–2	5–0	1–2
Beltinci	0–4		2–1	1–3	2–1	3–0	0–0	1–4	1–2	4–1	1–1	0–0	2–0	1–1	2–0	1–3
Bilje	2–0	4–2		0–0	1–1	3–0	0–3	2–2	1–0	2–0	0–0	0–1	0–0	1–3	2–0	0–4
Bistrica	1–1	2–2	1–1		2–2	3–2	4–0	1–0	2–2	8–2	2–1	2–1	2–1	0–0	4–2	2–3
Brinje	1–0	2–0	1–0	1–1		4–0	6–0	0–0	4–1	4–0	1–1	2–0	2–1	2–2	1–0	0–1
Drava	2–3	2–1	2–2	0–4	1–4		0–4	0–6	0–1	1–0	0–1	1–0	1–1	2–4	1–2	0–2
Dravinja	1–2	2–1	1–0	2–1	0–2	0–0		0–3	1–1	0–0	0–0	0–1	1–0	0–0	4–1	1–0
Gorica	1–1	2–0	2–0	3–1	1–2	3–0	0–3		2–1	2–1	1–0	3–3	2–5	1–1	2–0	2–0
Ilirija 1911	1–4	2–2	2–0	0–0	1–6	0–3	0–1	1–3		1–2	1–1	1–2	0–0	1–1	1–0	2–2
Jadran	1–2	2–0	2–4	1–1	0–2	3–1	1–0	2–4	0–0		1–3	2–0	2–1	3–1	0–2	1–6
Krka	2–0	1–0	2–2	0–2	1–0	2–0	0–3	1–3	1–0	2–1		3–0	1–1	0–1	1–2	0–2
Rudar	0–3	0–5	1–0	2–2	2–0	0–0	1–2	2–2	0–0	0–0	0–0		0–2	1–2	2–1	2–2
Slovan	0–1	3–2	1–0	0–2	1–2	1–2	2–1	3–1	1–1	0–1	2–1	1–1		0–2	1–1	1–1
Tabor	3–2	3–0	2–2	0–0	3–3	2–0	4–1	0–0	5–2	3–1	0–1	1–1	1–2		3–1	2–0
Tolmin	0–1	0–2	0–1	3–5	3–0	1–1	0–5	1–2	0–2	0–1	1–0	0–4	1–1	3–3		1–0
Triglav	1–4	0–1	7–4	3–1	2–0	4–0	4–0	2–3	1–0	1–0	3–0	5–0	3–2	3–2	5–0	

Source: NZS
Legend: Blue = home team win; Yellow = draw; Red = away team win.

== Season statistics ==
=== Top goalscorers ===
Rank	Player	Team	Goals
1	(Russia) Stanislav Krapukhin	Bistrica	19
2	(The Gambia) Bamba Susso	Aluminij	15
3	(Slovenia) Luka Marjanac	Gorica	12
3	(Croatia) Josip Ivan Zorica	Brinje	12
5	(Slovenia) Anis Jašaragič	Brinje	11
5	(Slovenia) Jaša Martinčič	Bistrica	11
7	(Slovenia) Adriano Bloudek	Gorica	10
7	(Slovenia) Leon Marinič	Bilje	10
7	(Slovenia) Lan Piskule	Triglav	10
10	(Slovenia) Luka Šušnjara	Triglav	9
10	(Slovenia) Jakob Cukjati	Triglav	9
10	(Slovenia) Tian Pantelić	Slovan/Tabor	9
10	(Italy) Divine Omoregie	Bilje	9

Source: NZS

== See also ==
- 2024–25 Slovenian PrvaLiga
