= 2022–23 Slovenian Second League =

Slovenian Second League
- Season: 2022–23
- Champions: Rogaška
- Promoted: Rogaška; Aluminij
- Relegated: Krško; Dob
- Matches played: 240
- Goals scored: 672 (2.8 per match)
- Top goalscorer: Matej Poplatnik (24 goals)
- Longest winning run: 7 matches Rogaška
- Longest unbeaten run: 15 matches Rogaška
- Highest attendance: 1,500; Beltinci 4–3 Nafta 1903
- Lowest attendance: 50; Krka 2–1 Nafta 1903; Krško 0–1 Brinje
- Total attendance: 53,911
- Average attendance: 224

The 2022–23 Slovenian Second League season was the 32nd edition of the Slovenian Second League. The season began on 29 July 2022 and ended on 20 May 2023.

== Competition format ==
Each team played a total of 30 matches (15 home and 15 away). Teams played two matches against each other (1 home and 1 away).

== Teams ==
Location of teams in the 2022–23 Slovenian Second League

Club	Location	Stadium	Capacity
Aluminij	Kidričevo	Aluminij Sports Park	600
Beltinci	Beltinci	Beltinci Sports Park	1,346
Bilje	Bilje	Stadion V dolinci	300
Bistrica	Slovenska Bistrica	Slovenska Bistrica Sports Park	964
Brinje Grosuplje	Grosuplje	Brinje Stadium	489
Dob	Dob	Dob Sports Park	300
Fužinar	Ravne na Koroškem	Ravne City Stadium	500
Ilirija 1911	Ljubljana	Ilirija Sports Park	1,000
Jadran Dekani	Dekani	Dekani Sports Park	400
Krka	Novo Mesto	Portoval	500
Krško	Krško	Matija Gubec Stadium	1,470
Nafta 1903	Lendava	Lendava Sports Park	2,000
Primorje	Ajdovščina	Ajdovščina Stadium	1,630
Rogaška	Rogaška Slatina	Rogaška Slatina Sports Centre	400
Rudar Velenje	Velenje	Ob Jezeru City Stadium	1,864
Triglav Kranj	Kranj	Stanko Mlakar Stadium	2,060

== League table ==
=== Standings ===
Pos	Team	Pld	W	D	L	GF	GA	GD	Pts	Promotion, qualification or relegation
1	Rogaška (C, P)	30	21	5	4	52	23	+29	68	Promotion to Slovenian PrvaLiga
2	Aluminij (P)	30	19	7	4	58	23	+35	64	Qualification to promotion play-off
3	Ilirija 1911	30	16	6	8	55	30	+25	54	
4	Krka	30	14	11	5	46	28	+18	53	
5	Beltinci	30	12	8	10	47	45	+2	44	
6	Nafta 1903	30	11	8	11	50	43	+7	41	
7	Primorje	30	10	11	9	42	40	+2	41	
8	Brinje Grosuplje	30	11	5	14	30	37	−7	38	
9	Bistrica	30	9	10	11	39	40	−1	37	
10	Bilje	30	10	7	13	40	53	−13	37	
11	Jadran Dekani	30	7	14	9	27	29	−2	35	
12	Triglav Kranj	30	10	5	15	33	52	−19	35	
13	Rudar Velenje	30	7	11	12	41	51	−10	32	
14	Fužinar	30	8	7	15	39	56	−17	31	
15	Krško (R)	30	6	6	18	36	59	−23	24	Relegation to Slovenian Third League
16	Dob (R)	30	4	9	17	37	63	−26	21	Relegation to Slovenian Third League

Source: NZS
Rules for classification: 1) points; 2) points in head-to-head matches; 3) goal difference in head-to-head matches; 4) away goals scored in head-to-head matches; 5) total goal difference; 6) total goals scored; 7) away goals scored in all matches; 8) fair-play; 9) draw
(C) Champions; (P) Promoted; (R) Relegated

== Results ==
Home \ Away	ALU	BEL	BIL	BIS	BRI	DOB	FUŽ	ILI	JAD	KRK	KRŠ	NAF	PRI	ROG	RUD	TRI
Aluminij		2–0	4–0	3–1	1–0	3–1	4–0	0–0	4–1	0–0	2–0	1–1	0–1	1–2	2–2	0–1
Beltinci	2–2		2–4	3–3	2–0	2–1	0–2	1–1	3–0	0–1	2–1	4–3	1–1	0–2	2–0	1–2
Bilje	1–3	1–2		2–1	0–1	1–0	2–2	0–2	0–4	1–1	3–5	1–2	1–1	1–2	4–3	2–0
Bistrica	1–1	1–2	1–2		2–1	1–1	4–0	4–0	1–1	0–1	2–1	1–0	0–0	0–2	2–2	1–1
Brinje	0–2	0–1	1–3	1–0		2–0	2–3	0–2	1–1	1–3	1–1	1–3	0–2	0–1	1–0	2–0
Dob	3–2	1–1	1–2	1–1	1–3		3–1	1–4	0–0	2–1	0–1	1–2	4–1	0–3	0–4	2–3
Fužinar	0–1	0–3	5–2	1–1	0–1	2–2		0–4	0–1	1–3	2–0	2–1	1–0	0–1	2–2	2–2
Ilirija 1911	2–3	2–3	2–1	1–2	1–1	5–2	1–1		0–0	2–0	3–1	2–0	1–0	0–0	3–1	5–0
Jadran	0–2	2–0	0–1	0–1	1–1	2–2	4–1	1–0		1–1	1–0	1–3	0–1	0–1	1–1	0–0
Krka	2–2	0–0	3–1	1–0	4–1	2–2	1–2	3–2	1–0		3–0	2–1	1–0	0–2	1–1	2–0
Krško	1–3	3–2	0–0	2–2	0–1	3–2	1–0	0–4	1–2	2–2		1–3	2–2	0–2	2–1	1–2
Nafta 1903	1–3	2–2	2–2	0–2	0–2	0–0	1–1	3–0	1–1	0–0	4–2		2–4	0–1	4–2	2–0
Primorje	0–1	1–2	0–0	2–0	1–1	1–1	1–4	0–1	2–2	2–2	3–2	0–3		4–2	2–2	5–2
Rogaška	0–1	3–1	3–1	4–0	0–2	3–0	3–1	1–0	0–0	1–0	2–1	3–3	1–1		5–3	0–2
Rudar	0–1	2–2	0–0	2–1	2–0	2–1	3–2	1–3	0–0	1–1	1–0	0–3	0–2	1–1		0–2
Triglav	0–4	2–1	0–1	2–3	0–2	5–2	2–1	0–2	0–0	0–4	2–2	1–0	1–2	0–1	1–2	

Source: NZS
Legend: Blue = home team win; Yellow = draw; Red = away team win.

== Season statistics ==
=== Top goalscorers ===
Rank	Player	Team	Goals
1	(Slovenia) Matej Poplatnik	Ilirija 1911	24
2	(Slovenia) Nik Marinšek	Aluminij	21
3	(The Gambia) Bamba Susso	Bilje	14
4	(Slovenia) Nejc Gradišar	Rogaška	12
5	(Slovenia) Gal Grobelnik	Beltinci	11
5	(Slovenia) Dejan Djermanović	Ilirija 1911	11
5	(Croatia) Filip Kosić	Rudar	11
8	(Croatia) Dino Kapitanović	Krka	10
8	(Slovenia) Gašper Černe	Dob	10
8	(Croatia) Stjepan Oštrek	Nafta 1903	10

Source: NZS

== See also ==
- 2022–23 Slovenian PrvaLiga
