= 2018–19 Slovenian Second League =

Slovenian Second League
- Season: 2018–19
- Champions: Bravo
- Promoted: Bravo; Tabor Sežana
- Relegated: Ilirija 1911; Ankaran
- Matches played: 240
- Goals scored: 726 (3.03 per match)
- Top goalscorer: Anel Hajrić (35 goals)
- Best goalkeeper: Darko Marjanović
- Biggest home win: Bravo 6–0 Bilje; Radomlje 6–0 Bilje
- Biggest away win: Rogaška 1–7 Drava
- Highest scoring: Nafta 1903 6–3 Ankaran; Jadran 4–5 Fužinar
- Highest attendance: 1,200; Beltinci 1–2 Nafta 1903; Nafta 1903 1–1 Drava
- Lowest attendance: 30; Ankaran 0–3 Krka
- Total attendance: 50,983
- Average attendance: 213

The 2018–19 Slovenian Second League season was the 28th edition of the Slovenian Second League. The season began on 4 August 2018 and ended on 26 May 2019.

== Competition format ==
Each team played a total of 30 matches (15 home and 15 away). Teams played two matches against each other (1 home and 1 away).

== Teams ==
Location of teams in the 2018–19 Slovenian Second League

The key for the 16 teams contesting the league was:

- 1 relegated team from the 2017–18 Slovenian PrvaLiga
- 13 teams ranked second to fourteenth in the 2017–18 Slovenian Second League season
- 2 promoted teams from the 2017–18 Slovenian Third League.

=== Stadiums and locations ===
Team	Location	Stadium	Capacity
Ankaran	Koper	Bonifika Stadium	4,047
Beltinci	Beltinci	Beltinci Sports Park	1,346
Bilje	Bilje	Stadion V dolinci	300
Bravo	Ljubljana	Šiška Sports Park	2,308
Brda	Dobrovo	Vipolže Stadium	193
Brežice 1919	Brežice	Brežice Stadium	516
Dob	Dob	Dob Sports Park	300
Drava Ptuj	Ptuj	Ptuj City Stadium	2,207
Fužinar	Ravne na Koroškem	Ravne City Stadium	600
Ilirija 1911	Ljubljana	Ilirija Sports Park	1,440
Jadran Dekani	Dekani	Dekani Sports Park	800
Krka	Novo Mesto	Portoval	500
Nafta 1903	Lendava	Lendava Sports Park	2,000
Radomlje	Radomlje	Radomlje Sports Park	700
Rogaška	Rogaška Slatina	Rogaška Slatina Sports Centre	354
Tabor Sežana	Sežana	Rajko Štolfa Stadium	1,310

Note: "Capacity" includes seating capacity only. Most stadiums also have standing areas.

=== Personnel ===
As of May 2019

Team	Manager	Captain
Ankaran	Vlado Badžim	Jan Pahor
Beltinci	Zlatko Gabor	Jernej Tkalec
Bilje	Sandi Valentinčič	Luka Žižmond
Bravo	Dejan Grabić	Milan Đajić
Brda	Alen Ščulac	Denis Jazbar
Brežice 1919	Darko Karapetrović	Marko Felja
Dob	Nenad Toševski	Klemen Kunstelj
Drava Ptuj	— (Note: After Nikola Jaroš was sacked in April 2019, Andrej Kvas became the temporary head coach until the end of the season.)	Nastja Čeh
Fužinar	Domen Fasvald	Denis Halilović
Ilirija 1911	Krištof Kastelec	Toni Šušković
Jadran Dekani	Nedžad Okčić	Luka Stepančič
Krka	Borivoje Lučić	Darko Marjanović
Nafta 1903	Anže Stegne (Note: Officially listed as manager by the Football Association since Marián Sluka, the manager of Nafta, did not have a proper manager licence.)	Mitja Novinič
Radomlje	— (Note: After Muamer Vugdalić was sacked in April 2019, Dušan Balutto became the temporary head coach until the end of the season.)	Igor Barukčič
Rogaška	Matej Polegek	Aleš Grošič
Tabor Sežana	Andrej Razdrh	Klemen Kariž

== League table ==
=== Standings ===
Pos	Team	Pld	W	D	L	GF	GA	GD	Pts	Promotion, qualification or relegation
1	Bravo (C, P)	30	22	3	5	70	28	+42	69	Promotion to Slovenian PrvaLiga
2	Tabor Sežana (O, P)	30	19	6	5	59	22	+37	63	Qualification to promotion play-off
3	Radomlje	30	18	5	7	71	38	+33	59	
4	Krka	30	15	9	6	59	41	+18	54	
5	Nafta 1903	30	14	8	8	52	35	+17	50	
6	Fužinar	30	13	9	8	46	34	+12	48	
7	Drava Ptuj	30	13	6	11	49	35	+14	45	
8	Dob	30	10	10	10	46	42	+4	40	
9	Bilje	30	10	6	14	33	54	−21	36	
10	Rogaška	30	8	10	12	35	50	−15	34	
11	Beltinci	30	9	4	17	35	57	−22	31	
12	Brda	30	6	11	13	35	46	−11	29	
13	Jadran Dekani	30	7	7	16	44	65	−21	28	
14	Brežice 1919	30	6	8	16	32	52	−20	26	
15	Ilirija (R)	30	7	5	18	33	65	−32	26	Relegation to Slovenian Third League
16	Ankaran (Note: Ankaran were deducted three points.) (R)	30	6	7	17	27	62	−35	22	Relegation to Slovenian Third League

Source: NZS
Rules for classification: 1) points; 2) points in head-to-head matches; 3) goal difference in head-to-head matches; 4) away goals scored in head-to-head matches; 5) total goal difference; 6) total goals scored; 7) away goals scored in all matches; 8) fair-play; 9) draw
(C) Champions; (O) Play-off winners; (P) Promoted; (R) Relegated

== Results ==
Home \ Away	ANK	BEL	BIL	BRA	BRD	BRE	DOB	DRA	FUŽ	ILI	JAD	KRK	NAF	RAD	ROG	TAB
Ankaran		2–0	3–1	0–0	0–0	3–1	0–1	0–3	0–3	1–0	1–0	0–3	3–1	0–1	1–1	0–4
Beltinci	3–2		0–1	1–3	0–1	2–1	1–1	1–4	1–3	5–1	1–2	0–0	2–4	2–0	1–2	0–3
Bilje	1–1	0–1		0–2	3–1	1–1	2–1	1–1	2–0	1–2	1–0	1–2	2–2	5–2	1–0	0–5
Bravo	3–0	3–1	6–0		3–1	3–1	1–0	1–0	4–0	2–0	5–1	2–2	2–1	1–2	3–0	3–2
Brda	1–0	1–1	0–1	0–1		0–0	1–1	1–3	0–0	5–0	0–0	1–1	1–1	1–3	1–0	1–1
Brežice 1919	5–1	5–0	2–1	1–2	1–0		1–1	1–5	1–0	3–1	1–1	0–1	0–1	1–4	0–0	1–1
Dob	4–1	2–2	1–0	1–2	4–3	3–0		0–1	0–1	3–1	3–1	2–4	2–0	3–3	2–2	2–1
Drava	2–0	1–0	3–0	0–1	1–2	2–0	1–2		0–0	2–3	0–0	2–1	2–0	0–2	0–3	1–1
Fužinar	1–1	1–2	0–2	3–2	0–0	4–0	2–1	2–0		4–2	1–1	2–2	0–0	0–2	1–1	2–1
Ilirija	4–0	0–2	0–0	0–3	4–2	1–1	2–0	3–1	0–2		1–1	1–2	2–0	1–1	0–0	0–3
Jadran	3–0	3–2	0–3	0–5	5–3	4–1	3–3	0–1	4–5	3–1		4–3	1–2	2–2	2–3	0–2
Krka	2–2	0–1	5–0	1–2	2–2	3–2	1–1	2–1	3–1	3–2	2–1		1–3	2–3	2–1	1–0
Nafta	6–3	4–0	1–1	3–2	3–2	0–0	0–0	1–1	0–3	5–0	2–0	2–2		1–0	2–0	0–1
Radomlje	4–0	4–1	6–0	3–2	1–2	2–1	3–1	3–1	1–1	5–1	5–1	1–1	0–2		3–1	0–3
Rogaška	1–1	0–2	3–2	1–1	2–0	4–0	1–1	1–7	0–4	3–0	3–0	1–3	0–4	0–5		1–1
Tabor	3–1	3–0	3–0	3–0	4–2	1–0	1–0	3–3	1–0	2–0	3–1	0–2	2–1	1–0	0–0	

Source: NZS
Legend: Blue = home team win; Yellow = draw; Red = away team win.

== Season statistics ==
=== Top goalscorers ===
Rank	Player	Team	Goals
1	(Bosnia and Herzegovina) Anel Hajrić	Radomlje	35
2	(France) Papa Ibou Kébé	Tabor Sežana	24
3	(Slovenia) Jaka Bizjak	Drava/Nafta 1903	17
3	(Slovenia) Mustafa Nukić	Bravo	17
5	(Slovenia) Žan Nikolić	Jadran Dekani	15
6	(Slovenia) Luka Cerar	Radomlje	12
6	(Slovenia) Matic Marcius	Brda	12
6	(Nigeria) Mathias Oyewusi	Ankaran/Bilje	12
9	(England) Matthias Fanimo	Drava	11

Source: NZS

=== Attendances ===
Pos	Team	Total	High	Low	Average	Change
1	Nafta 1903	6,250	1,200	150	417	−14.4%
2	Beltinci	5,250	1,200	150	350	−1.1%^{^{2}}
3	Tabor Sežana	5,250	600	250	350	+25.4%
4	Radomlje	3,723	700	100	248	+14.8%
5	Fužinar	3,550	400	100	237	−23.5%
6	Brežice 1919	3,368	425	95	225	+23.6%
7	Rogaška	3,240	400	140	216	−8.5%
8	Bilje	2,900	300	90	193	+18.4%^{^{2}}
9	Dob	2,810	400	50	187	+23.8%
10	Bravo	2,750	300	100	183	−24.1%
11	Drava Ptuj	2,420	250	100	161	−56.1%
12	Jadran Dekani	2,130	350	100	142	−19.8%
13	Brda	2,062	500	50	137	+34.3%
14	Ilirija 1911	1,960	250	60	131	−31.4%
15	Krka	1,850	200	100	123	+5.1%
16	Ankaran	1,470	300	30	98	−66.6%^{^{1}}
	League total	50,983	1,200	30	213	−23.1%

Source: NZS

Note ^{1}:Team played the previous season in the Slovenian PrvaLiga.
Note ^{2}:Team played the previous season in the Slovenian Third League.

== See also ==
- 2018–19 Slovenian Football Cup
- 2018–19 Slovenian PrvaLiga
- 2018–19 Slovenian Third League
