= List of Slovenian football transfers winter 2025–26 =

This is a list of Slovenian football transfers for the 2025–26 winter transfer window. Only transfers featuring Slovenian PrvaLiga are listed.

== Slovenian PrvaLiga ==
Note: Flags indicate national team as has been defined under FIFA eligibility rules. Players may hold more than one non-FIFA nationality.

=== Olimpija Ljubljana ===
In:

No.	Pos.	Nation	Player
8	MF	POR	Bruno Lourenço (from (Portugal) AVS)
97	FW	GHA	Kelvin Ofori (on loan from (Slovakia) Slovan Bratislava)

Out:

No.	Pos.	Nation	Player
19	FW	CRO	Ivan Durdov (to (Poland) Bruk-Bet Termalica)
24	FW	EST	Alex Tamm (on loan to (Scotland) Livingston)
36	GK	SVN	Gal Lubej Fink (to Dekani)
80	MF	BEN	Mariano Ahouangbo (on loan to (Armenia) Gandzasar Kapan)
88	MF	BRA	Thalisson (to (Japan) Montedio Yamagata)
—	DF	UKR	Danylo Malov (on loan to (Armenia) Gandzasar Kapan)
—	GK	SVN	Denis Pintol (on loan to (Croatia) Vukovar 1991, previously on loan at Primorje)

=== Maribor ===
In:

No.	Pos.	Nation	Player
7	MF	SVN	Tio Cipot (from (Italy) Spezia, previously on loan at (Austria) Grazer AK)
23	DF	IRL	James Furlong (from (England) Hull City)
27	FW	SVN	Luka Mlakar (from Domžale)
29	FW	CRO	Dario Vizinger (from Mura)

Out:

No.	Pos.	Nation	Player
8	MF	GHA	Eric Taylor (on loan to Aluminij)
12	DF	SVN	Gregor Sikošek (to (Croatia) Varaždin)
23	DF	IRQ	Adam Rasheed (to (Iraq) Al-Shorta)
29	DF	SVN	Luka Guček (to (Poland) Górnik Łęczna)
34	DF	SVN	Anej Lorbek (to Triglav Kranj)
41	MF	FRA	Malamine Bamba (free agent)
97	MF	SVN	Tine Čuk (on loan to Ilirija 1911)
99	FW	GAB	Orphé Mbina (on loan to (Azerbaijan) Sabah)
—	MF	SVN	Niko Grlić (on loan to Ilirija 1911, previously on loan at Bravo)
—	FW	SVN	Marcos Tavares (to Nafta 1903, previously on loan)

=== Koper ===
In:

No.	Pos.	Nation	Player
1	GK	SVK	Michal Kukučka (on loan from (Germany) 1. FC Nürnberg)
4	DF	MAD	Scotty Sadzoute (from (Lithuania) Šiauliai)
8	FW	SEN	Bassirou N'Diaye (from (France) Cannes)
9	FW	NGA	Brown Irabor (from (France) Guingamp)
11	MF	FRA	Ilann Petrisot (from (Netherlands) De Graafschap U21)
42	MF	FRA	Abdoulaye Dabo (free agent)

Out:

No.	Pos.	Nation	Player
1	GK	BIH	Muhamed Šahinović (loan return to (Poland) Raków Częstochowa)
5	MF	CRO	Ivan Jelić Balta (to Mura)
8	FW	BIH	Milan Šikanjić (loan return to (Bosnia and Herzegovina) Zrinjski Mostar)
9	FW	AUS	Tomi Juric (to (Bosnia and Herzegovina) Zrinjski Mostar)
23	MF	SVN	Sandro Jovanović (on loan to Primorje)
28	DF	SVN	Dominik Ivkič (to (Bulgaria) Septemvri Sofia)
39	MF	SVN	Damjan Bohar (free agent)
48	FW	SVN	Maj Žigart (on loan to Tabor Sežana)
49	MF	SVN	Timotej Brkić (to Brežice 1919)
59	MF	EST	Bogdan Vaštšuk (to (Estonia) Nõmme Kalju)
—	MF	SVN	Žan Žabkar (on loan to Tabor Sežana, previously on loan at Dekani)
—	MF	CRO	Petar Petriško (on loan to (Bosnia and Herzegovina) Široki Brijeg, previously on loan at Aluminij)
—	FW	NGA	Wisdom Sule (on loan to (Croatia) Gorica, previously on loan at Aluminij)
—	GK	SVN	Tim Štrasberger (to Brinje Grosuplje, previously on loan at Gorica)

=== Celje ===
In:

No.	Pos.	Nation	Player
10	MF	SVN	Svit Sešlar (from (Turkey) Eyüpspor)
22	MF	CRO	Jakov Pranjić (from (Bosnia and Herzegovina) Zrinjski Mostar)
27	MF	CRO	Ivan Ćalušić (from Radomlje)
—	MF	CRO	Domagoj Vidović (from (Bosnia and Herzegovina) Velež Mostar)

Out:

No.	Pos.	Nation	Player
9	FW	CRO	Franko Kovačević (to (Hungary) Ferencváros)
10	FW	SVN	Danijel Šturm (to (Czech Republic) Sigma Olomouc)
26	DF	SVN	Sen Džumhur (on loan to Bistrica)
42	DF	SVN	Matija Boben (on loan to Mura)
71	FW	BLR	Vitaly Lisakovich (free agent)
—	MF	CRO	Domagoj Vidović (on loan to Bistrica)
—	MF	SVN	Lucas Mačak (on loan to Triglav Kranj)
—	MF	SVN	Luka Perković (to Krka)
—	FW	NED	Nino Noordanus (to (China) Wuxi Wugo)
—	FW	SWE	Anomnachi Chidi (to (Sweden) Sandviken, previously on loan at (Bosnia and Herzegovina) Sarajevo)

=== Bravo ===
In:

No.	Pos.	Nation	Player
5	MF	SEN	Fallou Faye (from Domžale)
7	FW	ITA	Divine Omoregie (from Bilje, previously on loan at Domžale)
22	GK	SVN	Benjamin Matičič (from Domžale)
42	MF	CRO	Luka Lukanić (from Domžale)

Out:

No.	Pos.	Nation	Player
6	MF	SVN	Beno Selan (to (Poland) Cracovia)
7	FW	SVN	Aldin Jakupović (to (Germany) Holstein Kiel)
18	MF	CRO	Lovre Kulušić (loan return to (Croatia) Dinamo Zagreb)
29	DF	SVN	Leo Jusić (to Bistrica)
40	MF	NGA	Victor Gidado (to (Turkey) Gaziantep)
44	DF	SVN	Mark Kerin (on loan to Bistrica)
79	MF	SVN	Niko Grlić (loan return to Maribor)
—	GK	SVN	Luka Dakić (on loan to Jesenice, previously on loan at Bistrica)
—	DF	SVN	Lan Hribar (to Ilirija 1911, previously on loan at Slovan)

=== Primorje ===
In:

No.	Pos.	Nation	Player
11	MF	CRO	Mile Parmać (from (Croatia) Istra 1961 U19)
28	MF	SVN	Sandro Jovanović (on loan from Koper)
30	GK	CRO	Patrik Mohorović (from (Croatia) Dugopolje)
77	MF	SUI	Luca Šantor (from (Switzerland) Young Boys U19)
88	DF	CMR	Macky Bagnack (free agent)
95	FW	SVN	Luka Štor (from (Montenegro) Budućnost Podgorica)
—	DF	NGA	Sodiq Ismail (from (Nigeria) Remo Stars)
—	FW	BIH	Faris Dževahirić (from Celje U19)

Out:

No.	Pos.	Nation	Player
15	MF	SVN	Haris Dedić (on loan to Dekani)
16	DF	SVN	Alexander Stožinič (on loan to (Bosnia and Herzegovina) Famos)
24	MF	SVN	Dušan Ignjatović (on loan to (Bosnia and Herzegovina) Famos)
26	MF	BRA	Pará (free agent)
73	GK	SVN	Denis Pintol (loan return to Olimpija Ljubljana)
91	FW	SVN	Edvin Suljanović (to (Bosnia and Herzegovina) Sloga Meridian)
—	DF	SVN	Miha Dobnikar (on loan to Brinje Grosuplje, previously on loan at Dekani)
—	DF	SVN	Samo Matjaž (to Brinje Grosuplje, previously on loan)

=== Mura ===
In:

No.	Pos.	Nation	Player
5	MF	CRO	Ivan Jelić Balta (from Koper)
9	FW	ARG	Federico Rose (on loan from Tabor Sežana)
11	FW	CRO	Vanja Kulenović (from Rudar Velenje)
17	DF	SVN	Kristjan Trdin (from Bistrica)
18	MF	GHA	Godwin Agbevor (on loan from (Austria) Wolfsberg II)
19	MF	BIH	Hamza Ljukovac (on loan from (Turkey) İstanbul Başakşehir, previously on loan at (Czech Republic) Teplice)
24	MF	NED	Sacha Komljenovic (on loan from (Czech Republic) Baník Ostrava B)
33	GK	SVN	Žiga Fermišek (from Tabor Sežana)
42	DF	SVN	Matija Boben (on loan from Celje)

Out:

No.	Pos.	Nation	Player
3	DF	SVN	Klemen Pucko (to Odranci)
9	FW	CRO	Robert Murić (free agent)
12	GK	SVN	Florijan Raduha (to Aluminij)
25	FW	SVN	Jaka Domjan (to Aluminij)
29	FW	CRO	Dario Vizinger (to Maribor)
87	FW	MNE	Marko Mrvaljević (loan return to (Ukraine) Veres Rivne)
97	MF	BLR	Roman Pasevich (loan return to (Russia) Sochi)

=== Radomlje ===
In:

No.	Pos.	Nation	Player
7	FW	NGA	Divine Igwe Ikenna (from Beltinci)
9	FW	CRO	Vanja Pelko (from (Croatia) Gorica)
27	MF	CRO	Mihael Žaper (on loan from (Croatia) Dinamo Zagreb, previously on loan at (Croatia) Lokomotiva)
66	MF	SVN	Dejan Kantužer (from Bistrica)
87	DF	CRO	Borna Graonić (from (Croatia) Sesvete)
—	MF	SVN	Aljaž Zabukovnik (from Domžale)

Out:

No.	Pos.	Nation	Player
7	DF	SVN	Sandro Zukić (to Rudar Velenje)
9	FW	SVN	Nino Kukovec (to (Slovakia) Dunajská Streda)
13	MF	BIH	Hanan Duraković (to Slovan)
27	MF	CRO	Ivan Ćalušić (to Celje)
31	FW	GAM	Halifa Kujabi (free agent)
33	DF	SVN	Rok Ljutić (to Tabor Sežana)
47	MF	SVN	Aljaž Vodopivec (to Dravinja)
72	MF	SVN	Dejan Vokić (free agent)
—	MF	SVN	Aljaž Zabukovnik (on loan to Bistrica)
—	DF	SVN	Tilen Rajter Krebs (on loan to Rudar Velenje, previously on loan at Bistrica)
—	GK	IND	Som Kumar (to Slovan, previously on loan)

=== Domžale ===
In:

No.	Pos.	Nation	Player

Out:

No.	Pos.	Nation	Player
1	GK	GRE	Konstantinos Tsogas (to (Greece) Zakynthos)
2	DF	SVN	Rene Hrvatin (to (Croatia) Istra 1961)
5	DF	SVN	Rene Lampreht (to (Slovakia) Podbrezová)
7	MF	SVN	Dejan Lazarević (to (Austria) Donau Klagenfurt)
8	MF	AUT	Denis Bošnjak (to (Lithuania) TransINVEST)
9	FW	BRA	Felipe Felicio (loan return to (Greece) Panionios)
10	FW	SVN	Haris Vučkić (to (United Arab Emirates) Al Hamriyah)
11	FW	SVN	Luka Mlakar (to Maribor)
14	MF	GRE	Giannis Alexandrakis (loan return to (Greece) Panionios)
15	FW	SVN	Luka Dovžan Karahodžić (to Triglav Kranj)
19	DF	SVN	Nino Milić (to (Czech Republic) Karviná)
20	DF	NGA	Abraham Nwankwo (to (Estonia) Levadia)
22	GK	SVN	Benjamin Matičič (to Bravo)
23	FW	SVN	Tomaž Brdik (to Brežice 1919)
26	DF	GRE	Alexandros Bouris (loan return to (Greece) Panionios)
27	FW	ITA	Divine Omoregie (loan return to Bilje)
30	FW	BIH	Aleksandar Kahvić (loan return to (Germany) SSV Ulm)
32	MF	SEN	Fallou Faye (to Bravo)
34	MF	SVN	Aljaž Zabukovnik (to Radomlje)
36	MF	SVN	Gal Kranjčič (to (Portugal) Farense)
39	DF	SVN	Lev Bohinc (to Slovan)
40	DF	SVN	Lukas Hempt (to Ilirija 1911)
42	MF	CRO	Luka Lukanić (to Bravo)
66	DF	SVN	Luka Kambič (to Nafta 1903)
87	MF	UKR	Jose Martin Ribeiro (to (Latvia) Grobiņa)
—	FW	SVN	Mark Šerbec (to Slovan, previously on loan)

=== Aluminij ===
In:

No.	Pos.	Nation	Player
7	MF	GHA	Eric Taylor (on loan from Maribor)
13	MF	SVN	Matic Vrbanec (from (Georgia (country)) Iberia 1999)
41	DF	GRE	Stefanos Evangelou (from (Hungary) Nyíregyháza)
45	FW	GAM	Bamba Susso (from (Austria) First Vienna)
77	MF	CRO	Josip Pejić (from (Bosnia and Herzegovina) Željezničar)
97	GK	SVN	Florijan Raduha (from Mura)
—	FW	SVN	Jaka Domjan (from Mura)

Out:

No.	Pos.	Nation	Player
7	FW	HUN	Barnabás Tanyi (to (United States) CT United)
13	MF	BIH	Luka Božičković (to (Sweden) Östersund)
19	FW	NGA	Wisdom Sule (loan return to Koper)
31	GK	SVN	Jan Lampret (to Dravinja)
77	MF	CRO	Petar Petriško (loan return to Koper)
—	FW	SVN	Jaka Domjan (on loan to Brinje Grosuplje)

== See also ==
- 2025–26 Slovenian PrvaLiga
