= List of Slovenian football transfers winter 2024–25 =

This is a list of Slovenian football transfers for the 2024–25 winter transfer window. Only transfers featuring Slovenian PrvaLiga are listed.

== Slovenian PrvaLiga ==
Note: Flags indicate national team as has been defined under FIFA eligibility rules. Players may hold more than one non-FIFA nationality.

=== Celje ===
In:

No.	Pos.	Nation	Player
6	DF	LTU	Artemijus Tutyškinas (from (Poland) ŁKS Łódź)
9	FW	NED	Nino Noordanus (from (Lithuania) Džiugas)
14	FW	SWE	Anomnachi Chinasa Chidi (from (Sweden) Nordic United)
35	FW	FRA	Logan Delaurier-Chaubet (on loan from (Netherlands) Almere City)
41	GK	POR	Ricardo Silva (from (Georgia (country)) Dinamo Batumi)
44	DF	POL	Łukasz Bejger (from (Poland) Śląsk Wrocław)
70	DF	FRO	Hanus Sørensen (from (Faroe Islands) HB)
73	MF	RUS	Yegor Prutsev (on loan from (Serbia) Red Star Belgrade)

Out:

No.	Pos.	Nation	Player
6	DF	SVN	David Zec (to (Germany) Holstein Kiel)
8	MF	CRO	Luka Bobičanec (to (Vietnam) Hanoi)
17	FW	JAM	Rolando Aarons (free agent)
27	MF	RUS	Artem Sholar (loan return to (Russia) Spartak-2 Moscow)
28	DF	CRO	Slavko Bralić (on loan to (Croatia) Gorica)
31	MF	SVN	Jošt Pišek (on loan to Mura)
77	FW	CRO	Ivan Brnić (loan return to (Greece) Olympiacos)
98	GK	CRO	Lovro Štubljar (loan return to (Italy) Empoli)
—	DF	SVN	Samo Matjaž (on loan to Primorje, previously on loan at Brinje Grosuplje)
—	FW	SVN	Tian Kujović (to Slovan, previously on loan at Tolmin)

=== Maribor ===
In:

No.	Pos.	Nation	Player
11	FW	IRL	Ali Reghba (from (North Macedonia) Rabotnički)
44	DF	TUN	Omar Rekik (free agent)
70	MF	TUR	Bartuğ Elmaz (on loan from (Turkey) Fenerbahçe)
—	FW	FIN	Kai Meriluoto (on loan from (Finland) HJK)

Out:

No.	Pos.	Nation	Player
12	DF	SVN	Gregor Sikošek (on loan to (Croatia) Gorica)
13	FW	CIV	Etienne Beugre (to (France) Bordeaux)
50	DF	SVN	Lan Vidmar (on loan to Koper)
59	GK	SVN	Samo Pridgar (to Radomlje)
99	FW	GAB	Orphé Mbina (on loan to (Portugal) União de Leiria)
—	DF	SVN	Gal Mikluš Senekovič (to Gorica)
—	DF	SVN	Mark Strajnar (to Domžale, previously on loan at Mura)

=== Olimpija Ljubljana ===
In:

No.	Pos.	Nation	Player
16	MF	ALB	Jurgen Çelhaka (from (Poland) Legia Warsaw)
27	FW	EST	Alex Tamm (from (Estonia) Nõmme Kalju)

Out:

No.	Pos.	Nation	Player
4	DF	SRB	Nikola Motika (free agent)
28	FW	GER	Benjika Caciel (to (Germany) Rot-Weiß Erfurt)
—	FW	SVN	Mustafa Nukić (free agent)

=== Bravo ===
In:

No.	Pos.	Nation	Player
3	DF	GER	Christalino Atemona (free agent)
8	MF	SVN	Sandi Nuhanović (from Mura)
11	FW	CTA	Vénuste Baboula (from (France) Quevilly-Rouen)
22	DF	CRO	Marin Baturina (from (Croatia) HAŠK)
23	DF	COM	Kenan Toibibou (free agent)

Out:

No.	Pos.	Nation	Player
3	DF	POR	Miguel Rodrigues (to (Greece) Panargiakos)
8	MF	SVN	Gašper Trdin (to (Bulgaria) Levski Sofia)
33	FW	SVN	Milan Tučić (to (Hungary) Újpest)
—	DF	SVN	Kristjan Trdin (to Bistrica, previously on loan at Brinje Grosuplje)

=== Koper ===
In:

No.	Pos.	Nation	Player
8	MF	KOS	Toni Domgjoni (free agent)
34	DF	SVN	Anel Zulić (on loan from (Denmark) Viborg, previously on loan at Mura)
39	FW	SVN	Damjan Bohar (free agent)
49	MF	SVN	Timotej Brkić (from Mura)
80	MF	BEL	Jean-Pierre Longonda (from (Belgium) Seraing U23)
99	MF	FRA	Kamil Manseri (from (Italy) Novara)
—	DF	SVN	Lan Vidmar (on loan from Maribor)
—	MF	SVN	Enej Jelenič (on loan from (Italy) Novara)
—	GK	SVN	Miloš Medić (from Tabor Sežana)
—	MF	SVN	Riad Silajdžić (from Aluminij)

Out:

No.	Pos.	Nation	Player
5	MF	FRA	Ilan Bacha (on loan to Dekani)
6	MF	GHA	Abdul Samed Mukadas (on loan to Dekani)
30	FW	CRO	Nikola Burić (to Domžale)
—	GK	SVN	Tim Štrasberger (on loan to Gorica, previously on loan at Tolmin)
—	MF	SVN	Omar Kočar (to Aluminij, previously on loan)

=== Mura ===
In:

No.	Pos.	Nation	Player
7	MF	SVN	Jošt Pišek (on loan from Celje)
11	FW	SVN	Luka Kerin (from Dekani)
71	GK	CRO	Mario Mustapić (from (Croatia) Dubrava)
93	DF	BEL	Massimo Decoene (on loan from (Belgium) Kortrijk, previously on loan at (Belgium) Lokeren-Temse)
—	FW	CRO	Robert Murić (from (Croatia) Slaven Belupo)
—	MF	CRO	Frano Mlinar (from (Bosnia and Herzegovina) Zrinjski Mostar)
—	MF	CRO	Luka Jurak (on loan from (Croatia) Hajduk Split)
—	DF	BFA	Faad Sana (on loan from (Austria) Wolfsberg II)

Out:

No.	Pos.	Nation	Player
1	GK	CRO	Franko Kolić (to (Croatia) Istra 1961)
7	MF	USA	Steven Juncaj (to Austria Klagenfurt)
8	MF	SVN	Sandi Nuhanović (to Bravo)
9	MF	SVN	Matic Maruško (to (Austria) Pinkafeld)
10	FW	AUT	Srđan Spiridonović (free agent)
11	DF	SVN	Mato Miloš (free agent)
12	MF	USA	Hunter Olson (free agent)
14	MF	USA	Colin Stripling (free agent)
19	FW	BRA	Diogo Bezerra (to (Serbia) OFK Beograd)
21	DF	SVN	Tilen Ščernjavič (to (Czech Republic) Zlín)
23	DF	GRE	Vasilios Zogos (to (Albania) Teuta)
25	DF	SVN	Anel Zulić (loan return to (Denmark) Viborg)
32	DF	SVN	Mark Strajnar (loan return to Maribor)
34	FW	SVN	Anej Jelovica (on loan to Beltinci)
49	MF	SVN	Timotej Brkić (to Koper)
66	DF	SVN	Niko Graj (on loan to Beltinci)
—	DF	SVN	Tarik Bagola (on loan to Beltinci)

=== Domžale ===
In:

No.	Pos.	Nation	Player
1	GK	CRO	Lovro Štubljar (on loan from (Italy) Empoli, previously on loan at Celje)
8	MF	CRO	Bruno Jenjić (from (Bosnia and Herzegovina) Posušje)
11	FW	SVN	Luka Mlakar (from (Italy) Roma Primavera)
29	FW	CRO	Nikola Burić (from Koper)
33	DF	SVN	Mark Strajnar (from Maribor, previously on loan at Mura)

Out:

No.	Pos.	Nation	Player
8	MF	AUT	Daniel Offenbacher (to (Austria) Eugendorf)
11	FW	MKD	Mario Krstovski (to (Turkey) İstanbulspor)
17	MF	BIH	Nermin Hodžić (free agent)
32	FW	SVN	Gašper Černe (on loan to Ilirija 1911)
90	FW	SVN	Tomi Gobec (on loan to Ilirija 1911)
94	DF	FRA	Morré Makadji (free agent)
99	DF	BIH	Belmin Bobarić (to Ilirija 1911)
—	DF	SVN	Miha Vrhovnik (on loan to Ilirija 1911)

=== Radomlje ===
In:

No.	Pos.	Nation	Player
1	GK	SVN	Samo Pridgar (from Maribor)
8	MF	SVN	Jaka Kolenc (from (Poland) Podbeskidzie)
15	FW	SVN	Jaša Martinčič (from Bistrica)
24	MF	SVN	Dejan Vokić (free agent)
30	FW	BIH	Gedeon Guzina (free agent)
42	MF	SRB	Đorđe Gordić (on loan from (Belgium) Lommel, previously on loan at (Serbia) TSC)
—	GK	IND	Som Kumar (from (India) Kerala Blasters)
—	FW	CRO	Niko Gajzler (from (Croatia) Rijeka, previously on loan)

Out:

No.	Pos.	Nation	Player
1	GK	SVN	Emil Velić (to (Moldova) Sheriff Tiraspol)
11	FW	CRO	Noel Bilić (free agent)
13	MF	SVN	Nemanja Gavrić (free agent)
17	MF	SVN	Rok Štorman (to (Czech Republic) Karviná)
30	FW	BIH	Gedeon Guzina (to (Russia) Chernomorets Novorossiysk)
—	FW	CRO	Niko Gajzler (to (Croatia) Orijent)

=== Primorje ===
In:

No.	Pos.	Nation	Player
7	FW	COL	Roger Murillo (from (Colombia) Fortaleza CEIF)
12	GK	CRO	Josip Posavec (on loan from (Croatia) Rijeka)
—	DF	SVN	Samo Matjaž (on loan from Celje, previously on loan at Brinje Grosuplje)
—	FW	SVN	Haris Kadrić (from Nafta 1903)

Out:

No.	Pos.	Nation	Player
14	FW	BIH	Semir Smajlagić (to (South Korea) Chungnam Asan)
18	FW	POR	Gonçalo Agrelos (to (Australia) St George City)
20	MF	CRO	Marko Brkljača (loan return to (Croatia) Dinamo Zagreb)
24	FW	SVN	Dušan Ignjatović (on loan to Ilirija 1911)
30	DF	SVN	Kevin Benkič (to Brinje Grosuplje)
33	GK	SVN	Gašper Tratnik (to (Poland) Motor Lublin)
72	MF	SVN	Andraž Ruedl (loan return to Koper)
99	FW	SRB	Andrej Bogićević (to (Serbia) Grafičar Beograd)

=== Nafta 1903 ===
In:

No.	Pos.	Nation	Player
18	MF	SVN	Aleks Pihler (from (Bosnia and Herzegovina) Borac Banja Luka)
50	FW	CRO	Josip Špoljarić (from (Hungary) Zalaegerszeg)

Out:

No.	Pos.	Nation	Player
5	DF	SVN	Marko Čuček Bezjak (to Beltinci)
7	FW	SVN	Haris Kadrić (to Primorje)
70	FW	SVN	Niko Zamuda (to Bilje)

== See also ==
- 2024–25 Slovenian PrvaLiga
