= 2025–26 Slovenian Second League =

Slovenian Second League
- Season: 2025–26
- Dates: 8 August 2025 – 23 May 2026
- Champions: Brinje Grosuplje
- Promoted: Brinje Grosuplje; Nafta 1903
- Relegated: Gorica
- Matches: 240
- Goals: 677 (2.82 per match)
- Top goalscorer: Murat Bajraj (22 goals)
- Biggest home win: Triglav Kranj 10–1 Bilje (21 November 2025)
- Highest scoring: Triglav Kranj 10–1 Bilje (21 November 2025)
- Longest winning run: 9 matches Nafta 1903, Triglav Kranj
- Longest unbeaten run: 28 matches Nafta 1903
- Longest winless run: 18 matches Gorica
- Longest losing run: 8 matches Jesenice
- Highest attendance: 3,000; Beltinci 2–3 Nafta 1903
- Total attendance: 71,491
- Average attendance: 297

The 2025–26 Slovenian Second League season was the 35th edition of the Slovenian Second League. The season began on 8 August 2025 and ended on 23 May 2026.

== Competition format ==
Each team played a total of 30 matches (15 home and 15 away). Teams played two matches against each other (1 home and 1 away).

== Teams ==
Location of teams in the 2025–26 Slovenian Second League

Club	Location	Stadium	Capacity
Beltinci	Beltinci	Beltinci Sports Park	1,346
Bilje	Bilje	Stadion V dolinci	300
Bistrica	Slovenska Bistrica	Slovenska Bistrica Sports Park	964
Brinje Grosuplje	Grosuplje	Brinje Football Park	492
Dravinja	Slovenske Konjice	Dobrava Stadium	
Gorica	Nova Gorica	Nova Gorica Sports Park	3,100
Ilirija 1911	Ljubljana	Ilirija Sports Park	1,000
Jadran Dekani	Dekani	Dekani Sports Park	400
Jesenice	Jesenice	Podmežakla Sports Park	
Krka	Novo Mesto	Portoval	760
Krško Posavje	Krško	Matija Gubec Stadium	1,470
Nafta 1903	Lendava	Lendava Sports Park	2,000
Rudar Velenje	Velenje	Ob Jezeru City Stadium	1,864
Slovan	Ljubljana	Kodeljevo Sports Park	
Tabor Sežana	Sežana	Rajko Štolfa Stadium	1,310
Triglav Kranj	Kranj	Stanko Mlakar Stadium	2,060

== League table ==
=== Standings ===
Pos	Team	Pld	W	D	L	GF	GA	GD	Pts	Promotion, qualification or relegation
1	Brinje Grosuplje (C, P)	30	23	6	1	70	26	+44	75	Promotion to Slovenian PrvaLiga
2	Nafta 1903 (P)	30	23	6	1	65	23	+42	75	Qualification to promotion play-off
3	Triglav Kranj	30	20	4	6	72	28	+44	64	
4	Beltinci	30	18	6	6	55	25	+30	60	
5	Tabor Sežana	30	15	5	10	37	33	+4	50	
6	Bistrica	30	13	6	11	50	36	+14	45	
7	Dravinja	30	10	7	13	32	44	−12	37	
8	Rudar Velenje	30	9	10	11	46	39	+7	37	
9	Bilje	30	9	7	14	27	47	−20	34	
10	Jadran Dekani	30	8	9	13	40	46	−6	33	
11	Slovan	30	9	5	16	32	52	−20	32	
12	Krka	30	6	11	13	32	51	−19	29	
13	Ilirija 1911	30	6	9	15	38	52	−14	27	
14	Krško Posavje	30	7	5	18	24	62	−38	26	
15	Gorica (R)	30	4	10	16	31	45	−14	22	Relegation to Littoral League (Note: Failed to obtain a licence for the Slovenian Second League; relegated to the fourth tier.)
16	Jesenice	30	4	6	20	26	68	−42	18	

Source: NZS
Rules for classification: 1) points; 2) points in head-to-head matches; 3) goal difference in head-to-head matches; 4) away goals scored in head-to-head matches; 5) total goal difference; 6) total goals scored; 7) away goals scored in all matches; 8) fair-play; 9) draw
(C) Champions; (P) Promoted; (R) Relegated

== Results ==
Home \ Away	BEL	BIL	BIS	BRI	DRA	GOR	ILI	JAD	JES	KRK	KRŠ	NAF	RUD	SLO	TAB	TRI
Beltinci		1–3	3–0	2–3	1–1	3–0	3–1	2–0	5–1	4–0	1–1	2–3	2–1	0–0	1–2	0–0
Bilje	0–1		0–0	0–1	2–0	3–2	1–1	0–0	2–0	0–0	2–1	0–1	2–1	0–1	2–1	0–1
Bistrica	0–1	3–0		0–4	2–0	1–2	2–2	2–0	1–1	3–0	6–0	0–2	3–1	1–0	2–1	4–3
Brinje	1–0	3–0	2–0		2–1	1–0	3–2	1–1	8–1	0–0	5–0	2–1	4–2	2–1	2–1	2–0
Dravinja	0–2	1–0	0–3	1–1		2–1	2–1	1–1	0–2	1–0	2–1	2–2	1–0	2–1	0–1	2–4
Gorica	2–3	1–1	2–2	2–2	1–1		1–0	1–2	0–0	1–3	1–2	1–1	2–3	1–1	0–0	0–1
Ilirija 1911	1–3	1–0	2–1	0–3	2–5	1–1		2–2	2–0	1–1	1–0	0–2	2–2	1–2	2–3	0–2
Jadran	0–1	2–2	1–0	1–1	3–0	2–1	3–1		3–0	4–3	1–2	0–2	1–2	5–1	0–3	3–4
Jesenice	0–2	1–2	1–2	2–4	0–1	0–0	0–3	2–2		0–3	1–0	0–2	2–1	2–3	2–2	0–3
Krka	0–0	0–1	0–4	0–3	2–2	1–4	1–4	1–0	3–2		1–2	1–1	0–0	2–1	0–3	0–2
Krško	0–3	1–0	2–2	1–2	2–0	2–0	3–1	1–1	0–4	0–4		0–2	0–2	1–1	0–2	0–4
Nafta 1903	2–1	4–1	2–1	1–1	2–1	1–0	2–1	3–0	5–1	4–2	4–1		1–1	2–0	3–1	1–1
Rudar	2–2	5–0	0–0	2–3	1–1	2–1	0–0	2–2	1–1	0–0	3–0	0–1		4–0	5–1	0–3
Slovan	0–2	2–1	2–0	0–3	0–1	0–3	2–1	1–0	1–0	2–2	1–1	2–4	0–3		5–1	1–2
Tabor	0–2	1–1	2–1	0–1	2–0	1–0	1–1	2–0	1–0	0–0	1–0	0–2	2–0	1–0		0–1
Triglav	1–2	10–1	0–4	4–0	2–1	3–0	1–1	2–0	6–0	2–2	4–0	0–2	2–0	4–1	0–1	

Source: NZS
Legend: Blue = home team win; Yellow = draw; Red = away team win.

== Season statistics ==
=== Top goalscorers ===
Rank	Player	Team	Goals
1	(Slovenia) Murat Bajraj	Beltinci	22
2	(Slovenia) Amadej Maroša	Nafta 1903	20
3	(Montenegro) Nikola Jovićević	Brinje Grosuplje	17
3	(Croatia) Toni Vinogradac	Triglav Kranj	17
5	(Slovenia) Enej Marsetič	Bistrica	13
6	(Bosnia and Herzegovina) Marko Brkić	Triglav Kranj	11
7	(Slovenia) Oliver Kregar	Triglav Kranj	10
7	(Nigeria) Prosper Obiora Nwachukwu	Krško Posavje, Gorica	10
7	(Argentina) Agustín Urrutia	Ilirija 1911	10

Source: NZS

== See also ==
- 2025–26 Slovenian PrvaLiga
- 2025–26 Slovenian Football Cup
