= 2020–21 Slovenian Football Cup =

Tournament details
- Country: Slovenia
- Teams: 28

Final positions
- Champions: Olimpija Ljubljana (3rd title)
- Runners-up: Celje

Tournament statistics
- Matches played: 27
- Goals scored: 103 (3.81 per match)
- Top goal scorer(s): Stefan Stevanović (four goals)

The 2020–21 Slovenian Football Cup was the 30th edition of the football knockout competition in Slovenia. The tournament began on 2 September 2020 and ended on 25 May 2021 with the final. The winners of the competition, Olimpija Ljubljana, earned a place in the second qualifying round of the 2021–22 UEFA Europa Conference League.

Mura were the defending champions after winning the previous season's final.

== Qualified teams ==
=== 2019–20 Slovenian PrvaLiga members ===
- Aluminij
- Bravo
- Celje
- Domžale
- Maribor
- Mura
- Olimpija
- Rudar Velenje
- Tabor Sežana
- Triglav Kranj

=== Qualified through MNZ Regional Cups ===
- 2019–20 MNZ Koper Cup: Koper and Jadran Dekani
- 2019–20 MNZG-Kranj Cup: Bohinj and Šenčur
- 2019–20 MNZ Lendava Cup: Odranci and Nafta 1903
- 2019–20 MNZ Ljubljana Cup: Radomlje and Ilirija 1911
- 2019–20 MNZ Maribor Cup: Dravograd and Fužinar
- 2019–20 MNZ Murska Sobota Cup: Čarda and Beltinci
- 2019–20 MNZ Nova Gorica Cup: Adria and Brda
- 2019–20 MNZ Ptuj Cup: Drava Ptuj and Bistrica

=== Determined by draw ===
- MNZ Celje: Mons Claudius and Brežice 1919

== First round ==
Twelve first round matches were played from 2 to 23 September 2020.

| 2 September 2020 | Odranci (4) | 0–1 | Triglav Kranj (2) | Odranci |
| 16:30 | | Report | Janković 120+2' | Stadium: ŠRC Odranci; Referee: Alen Borošak |

| 2 September 2020 | Bohinj (4) | 0–10 | Koper (1) | Bohinjska Bistrica |
| 16:00 | | Report | Stevanović 9', 13', 56'; Mulahusejnović 18'; Čirjak 36'; Vršič 62'; Vekić 65', 90'; Krajinović 83'; Badžim 87' | Stadium: Igrišče Danica; Referee: Božo Kondić |

| 2 September 2020 | Adria (3) | 0–2 | Aluminij (1) | Miren |
| 16:00 | | Report | Grajfoner 40'; Klepač 73' | Stadium: Pri Štantu Stadium; Referee: Mihael Antič |

| 2 September 2020 | Brežice 1919 (2) | 4–0 | Jadran Dekani (2) | Brežice |
| 19:00 | Ribič 34', 36'; Rešetič 41', 74' | Report | | Stadium: Brežice Stadium; Referee: Bojan Tkalčič |

| 2 September 2020 | Šenčur (3) | 0–7 | Nafta 1903 (2) | Šenčur |
| 16:00 | | Report | Haljeta 13'; Oštrek 16', 40'; Bizjak 39', 42'; Pozsgai 56'; Vinko 90' | Stadium: Šenčur Sports Park; Referee: Roberto Ponis |

| 2 September 2020 | Čarda (4) | 1–5 | Rudar Velenje (2) | Martjanci |
| 16:00 | Barbarič 67' | Report | Malačič 1' (o.g.); Žurga 55'; Vošnjak 72', 77'; Jovanović 75' | Stadium: ŠRC Martjanci; Referee: Aleksandar Matković |

| 2 September 2020 | Mons Claudius (4) | 0–8 | Radomlje (2) | Rogatec |
| 16:00 | | Report | Đuzić 9', 77'; Nikolić 15', 48', 58'; Cerar 28'; Jazbec 83'; Turnšek 87' (o.g.) | Stadium: Rogatec Sports Centre; Referee: Marko Podgoršek |

| 2 September 2020 | Dravograd (3) | 0–6 | Drava Ptuj (2) | Dravograd |
| 16:00 | | Report | Dodlek 23', 80'; Kahrimanović 40'; Marcius 54'; Gassmann 72', 87' | Stadium: Dravograd Sports Centre; Referee: Denis Halilović |

| 2 September 2020 | Bistrica (3) | 1–2 | Tabor Sežana (1) | Slovenska Bistrica |
| 16:00 | Martinčič 63' | Report | Babić 52'; Rovas 61' | Stadium: Slovenska Bistrica Sports Park; Referee: Bojan Mertik |

| 2 September 2020 | Fužinar (2) | 3–1 | Brda (2) | Ravne na Koroškem |
| 16:00 | Fasvald 15'; Grubelnik 19'; Kovač 71' | Report | Frelih 85' | Stadium: Ravne City Stadium; Referee: Martin Matoša |

| 16 September 2020 | Ilirija 1911 (3) | 0–6 | Domžale (1) | Ljubljana |
| 15:00 | | Report | Mavretič 1'; Vuklišević 11'; Zec 58' (o.g.); Kolobarić 68', 81'; Mujan 86' | Stadium: Ilirija Sports Park; Referee: Martin Matoša |

| 23 September 2020 | Beltinci (2) | 2–0 | Bravo (1) | Beltinci |
| 15:00 | Pihler 51'; Verunica 90+1' | Report | | Stadium: Beltinci Sports Park; Referee: Roman Glažar |

== Round of 16 ==
The round of 16 ties were played between 20 October 2020 and 18 March 2021.

| 20 October 2020 | Rudar Velenje (2) | 0–3 | Maribor (1) | Velenje |
| 18:00 | | Report | Martinović 54'; Tavares 79'; Mlakar 90' | Stadium: Ob Jezeru City Stadium; Referee: Marko Podgoršek |

| 21 October 2020 | Brežice (2) | 3–3 (a.e.t.) (0–2 p) | Olimpija Ljubljana (1) | Brežice |
| 16:00 | Sokler 32', 66', 74' | Report | Vukušić 30'; Vombergar 80'; Samardžić 86' | Stadium: Brežice Stadium; Referee: Bojan Mertik |

| 21 October 2020 | Radomlje (2) | 3–2 | Tabor Sežana (1) | Radomlje |
| 14:00 | Primc 52'; Petek 55'; Varga 83' | Report | Doukouré 3'; Hlad 40' | Stadium: Radomlje Sports Park; Referee: Alen Borošak |

| 21 October 2020 | Koper (1) | 3–1 (a.e.t.) | Aluminij (1) | Koper |
| 18:00 | Vršič 48'; Jelić Balta 117'; Stevanović 120+1' | Report | Štusej 37' | Stadium: Bonifika Stadium; Referee: Asmir Sagrković |

| 22 October 2020 | Drava Ptuj (2) | 2–0 | Mura (1) | Zavrč |
| 14:00 | Marcius 48'; Piras 79' | Report | | Stadium: Zavrč Sports Park; Referee: Bojan Tkalčič |

| 17 March 2021 | Nafta 1903 (2) | 3–2 | Fužinar (2) | Lendava |
| 16:00 | Bizjak 33'; Oštrek 35'; Szabó 65' | Report | Koritnik 4'; Potokar 24' | Stadium: Lendava Sports Park; Referee: Dejan Balažič |

| 18 March 2021 | Beltinci (2) | 0–3 | Domžale (1) | Beltinci |
| 14:00 | | Report | Karić 12'; Kolobarić 17'; Podlogar 79' | Stadium: Beltinci Sports Park; Referee: Roman Glažar |

| 18 March 2021 | Triglav Kranj (2) | 1–2 | Celje (1) | Kranj |
| 16:00 | Čeh 7' | Report | Kljun 2'; Matjašič 13' | Stadium: Stanko Mlakar Stadium; Referee: Darjan Kovačič |

== Quarter-finals ==
The quarter-finals were played on 27 and 28 April 2021.

| 27 April 2021 | Celje (1) | 2–0 | Radomlje (2) | Celje |
| 15:00 CEST | Brecl 85'; Kerin 90+2' | Report | | Stadium: Stadion Z'dežele; Referee: Mihael Antič |

| 27 April 2021 | Domžale (1) | 2–1 | Maribor (1) | Domžale |
| 17:30 CEST | Podlogar 23'; Jakupović 43' | Report | Klinar 60' | Stadium: Domžale Sports Park; Referee: Matej Jug |

| 28 April 2021 | Drava Ptuj (2) | 0–2 | Koper (1) | Ptuj |
| 15:00 CEST | | Report | Mulahusejnović 28', 81' | Stadium: Ptuj City Stadium; Referee: Asmir Sagrković |

| 28 April 2021 | Nafta 1903 (2) | 0–1 (a.e.t.) | Olimpija Ljubljana (1) | Lendava |
| 17:30 CEST | | Report | Vombergar 111' | Stadium: Lendava Sports Park; Referee: Slavko Vinčić |

== Semi-finals ==
The semi-finals were played on 12 and 13 May 2021.

| 12 May 2021 | Domžale | 0–1 | Olimpija Ljubljana | Domžale |
| 18:00 CEST | | Report | Elšnik 70' | Stadium: Domžale Sports Park; Referee: Dragoslav Perić |

| 13 May 2021 | Celje | 1–0 | Koper | Celje |
| 20:00 CEST | Vrbanec 20' | Report | | Stadium: Stadion Z'dežele; Referee: Rade Obrenović |

== Final ==
The final was played on 25 May 2021.

25 May 2021
20:45 CEST

| Celje | 1–2 | Olimpija Ljubljana |
|---|---|---|
| Božić 46' | Report | Ivanović 32'; Kapun 53' |

Bonifika, Koper
Attendance: 1,200
Referee: Dragoslav Perić

== See also ==
- 2020–21 Slovenian PrvaLiga
