= List of football stadiums in Slovenia =

The following is a list of football stadiums in Slovenia, ranked in order of seating capacity, with the minimum capacity being 1,000.

== Current stadiums ==
No.	Image	Stadium	Capacity	City	Home team	Opened
1		Stožice Stadium	16,038	Ljubljana	NK Olimpija Ljubljana; NK Bravo	2010
2		Stadion Z'dežele	13,059	Celje	NK Celje	2003
3		Ljudski vrt	11,709	Maribor	NK Maribor	1952
4		Izola City Stadium	5,085	Izola	NK Izola	1964
5		Fazanerija City Stadium	4,506	Murska Sobota	NŠ Mura	1936
6		Bonifika Stadium	4,047	Koper	FC Koper	1948
7		Nova Gorica Sports Park	3,100	Nova Gorica		1964
7		Domžale Sports Park	3,100	Domžale	NK Radomlje	1948
9		Šiška Sports Park	2,308	Ljubljana		1931
10		Stanko Mlakar Stadium	2,060	Kranj	NK Triglav Kranj	1963
11		Lendava Sports Park	2,000	Lendava	NK Nafta 1903	1946
12		Dravograd Sports Centre	1,918	Dravograd	NK Dravograd	1995
13		Ob Jezeru City Stadium	1,864	Velenje	NK Rudar Velenje	1955
14		Ajdovščina City Stadium	1,630	Ajdovščina	ND Primorje	1929
15		Ptuj City Stadium	1,592	Ptuj	ŠD NŠ Drava Ptuj	1954
16		Loka Stadium	1,517	Črnomelj	NŠ Bela Krajina	1955
17		Ivančna Gorica Stadium	1,500	Ivančna Gorica	NK Ivančna Gorica	1973
18		Matija Gubec Stadium	1,470	Krško	NK Krško Posavje	1946
19		Beltinci Sports Park	1,346	Beltinci	ND Beltinci	1959
20		Rajko Štolfa Stadium	1,310	Sežana	NK Tabor Sežana	1920
21		Zagorje City Stadium	1,080	Zagorje ob Savi	NK Zagorje	1951
22		Ilirija Sports Park	1,000	Ljubljana	ND Ilirija 1911	1963
22		Rudar Sports Park	1,000	Trbovlje	NK Rudar Trbovlje	1962
22		Rogaška Slatina Sports Centre	1,000	Rogaška Slatina	NK Rogaška	1948

== See also ==
- Football in Slovenia
- List of association football stadiums by capacity
