= Edi Horvat =

Croatian footballer

Personal information
- Date of birth: 28 November 1998 (age 27)
- Place of birth: Zagreb, Croatia
- Height: 1.85 m (6 ft 1 in)
- Position: Forward

Team information
- Current team: Grindavík
- Number: 9

Youth career
- –2012: Inter Zaprešić
- 2012–2013: Ponikve
- 2013–2014: Laduč
- 2014–2017: Inter Zaprešić

Senior career*
| Years | Team | Apps | (Gls) |
| 2017–2018 | Aluminij | 2 | (0) |
| 2018 | → Brežice (loan) | 9 | (2) |
| 2018–2019 | Brežice | 12 | (3) |
| 2019–2021 | Fužinar | 51 | (21) |
| 2022 | Birmingham Legion | 14 | (0) |
| 2023 | NK Krka | 5 | (1) |
| 2023– | Grindavík | 19 | (3) |
- * Club domestic league appearances and goals as of 1 November 2023

Edi Horvat (born 28 November 1998) is a Croatian footballer who plays for Icelandic club Grindavík.

== Club career ==
Horvat began his professional career in 2017 at NK Aluminij Kidričevo in the Slovenian PrvaLiga, before a loan spell that became permanent at NK Brežice 1919, scoring five goals in 21 appearances across two seasons. Before moving to Slovenia, Horvat had recorded 16 goals in 20 games playing in his home country for the NK Inter Zaprešić Under-19 team.

In 2019, Horvat signed with Slovenian Second League side NK Fužinar, where he scored 21 goals in 51 appearances.

On 11 January 2022, it was announced that Horvat would join USL Championship side Birmingham Legion ahead of their 2022 season. He made his debut for Birmingham on 26 March 2022, starting against Colorado Springs Switchbacks. Following the 2022 season, Horvat was released by Birmingham.

== Career statistics ==
=== Career ===
As of 6 March 2024

Appearances and goals by club, season and competition
| Club | Season | League | | | National cup (Note: Includes Slovenian Football Cup, U.S. Open Cup, Icelandic Men's Football Cup) | | Total | |
| Club | Season | Division | Apps | Goals | Apps | Goals | Apps | Goals |
|---|---|---|---|---|---|---|---|---|
| Aluminij | 2017-18 | Slovenian PrvaLiga | 2 | 0 | 3 | 0 | 5 | 0 |
| Brežice (loan) | 2017-18 | Slovenian Second League | 9 | 2 | — | | 9 | 2 |
| Brežice | 2018-19 | Slovenian Second League | 12 | 3 | — | | 12 | 3 |
| Brežice | Total | | 21 | 5 | — | | 21 | 5 |
| Fužinar | 2018-19 | Slovenian Second League | 10 | 6 | — | | 10 | 6 |
| Fužinar | 2019-20 | Slovenian Second League | 3 | 0 | — | | 3 | 0 |
| Fužinar | 2020-21 | Slovenian Second League | 22 | 8 | 1 | 0 | 23 | 8 |
| Fužinar | 2021-22 | Slovenian Second League | 16 | 7 | — | | 16 | 7 |
| Fužinar | Total | | 51 | 21 | 1 | 0 | 51 | 21 |
| Birmingham Legion | 2022 | USL Championship | 14 | 0 | 1 | 0 | 15 | 0 |
| NK Krka | 2022-23 | Slovenian Second League | 5 | 1 | — | | 5 | 1 |
| Grindavík | 2023 | 1. deild karla | 18 | 3 | 2 | 0 | 20 | 3 |
| Triglav | 2023-24 | Slovenian Second League | 1 | 0 | — | | 1 | 0 |
| Career Total | | | 112 | 30 | 7 | 0 | 119 | 30 |
