= Aljaž Antolin =

Slovenian footballer (born 2002)

Personal information
- Date of birth: 2 August 2002 (age 24)
- Place of birth: Murska Sobota, Slovenia
- Height: 1.79 m (5 ft 10 in)
- Position: Midfielder

Team information
- Current team: Beltinci

Youth career
- 2007–2008: Ižakovci
- 2008–2010: Beltinci
- 2010–2013: Mura 05
- 2013–2021: Mura

Senior career*
Years	Team	Apps	(Gls)
2020–2021	Mura	3	(0)
2021–2024	Maribor	51	(1)
2021	→ Beltinci (loan)	13	(4)
2024–2026	Mura	58	(1)
2026–	Beltinci	0	(0)

International career
2022–2023	Slovenia U21	11	(1)
- * Club domestic league appearances and goals as of 29 July 2026

Aljaž Antolin (born 2 August 2002) is a Slovenian footballer who plays as a midfielder for Beltinci.

== Career ==
Antolin started his youth career at hometown club Ižakovci, and later played for Beltinci. In 2010, he moved to Mura 05 and joined the club's under-10 team. After Mura 05 went bankrupt in 2013, he transferred to the newly established phoenix club NŠ Mura.

On 11 February 2021, Antolin made his professional debut for Mura in the Slovenian PrvaLiga in a goalless draw against Tabor Sežana. Overall, he made three league appearances during the 2020–21 season, and also won the league title with the club.

On 16 July 2021, Antolin joined Maribor on a four-year contract. In August, he was sent on loan to the Slovenian Second League side Beltinci. After making 13 appearances and scoring 4 goals for Beltinci in the first half of the season, he returned to Maribor for the second half of the season and made his debut on 21 February 2022 in a 4–1 league win over Radomlje.

== Honours ==
Mura

- Slovenian PrvaLiga: 2020–21

Maribor

- Slovenian PrvaLiga: 2021–22
