= Nace Kosmač =

Slovenian footballer

Personal information
- Date of birth: 6 September 1986 (age 40)
- Height: 1.81 m (5 ft 11 in)
- Position: Attacking midfielder

Youth career
- Factor
- Bilje-Primorje
- Tabor Sežana

Senior career*
Years	Team	Apps	(Gls)
2003–2004	Tabor Sežana	5	(2)
2005	Bilje	7	(5)
2005–2010	Primorje	121	(13)
2010–2011	Domžale	11	(1)
2011	Tabor Sežana		
2012	Moreland Zebras		
2012–2013	Tabor Sežana	33	(11)
2013–2014	ISM Gradisca		
2014–2016	SS Vesna		
2016–2019	Tabor Sežana	46	(5)

International career
2004	Slovenia U18	1	(0)
2006	Slovenia U20	1	(1)
2007	Slovenia U21	6	(0)

Managerial career
- 2023: Tabor Sežana
- * Club domestic league appearances and goals

Nace Kosmač (born 6 September 1986) is a Slovenian retired footballer who played as an attacking midfielder.
