= Luka Guček =

Slovenian footballer (born 1999)

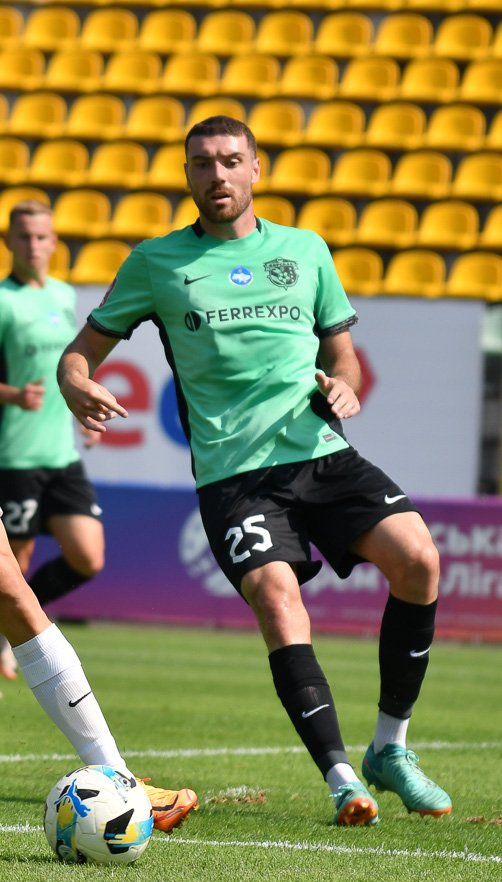
- Guček with Vorskla Poltava in 2024

Personal information
- Date of birth: 29 January 1999 (age 27)
- Place of birth: Brežice, Slovenia
- Height: 1.89 m (6 ft 2 in)
- Position: Centre-back

Team information
- Current team: Koper
- Number: 29

Youth career
- –2015: Krško
- 2015–2017: Betis
- 2017–2018: Domžale

Senior career*
Years	Team	Apps	(Gls)
2018–2019	Domžale	0	(0)
2018–2019	→ Dob (loan)	29	(2)
2019–2023	Radomlje	81	(3)
2023–2024	Chornomorets Odesa	32	(0)
2024–2025	Vorskla Poltava	17	(0)
2025	Maribor	2	(0)
2026	Górnik Łęczna	13	(1)
2026–	Koper	0	(0)

International career
2014	Slovenia U16		
2015–2016	Slovenia U17		
2015–2017	Slovenia U18		
2017	Slovenia U19		
- * Club domestic league appearances and goals as of 19 July 2026

Luka Guček (born 29 January 1999) is a Slovenian professional footballer who plays as a centre-back for Slovenian PrvaLiga club Koper.

== Club career ==
Guček hails from the village of Boštanj, and began his football career at the age of six at Dol, a club based in Dol pri Ljubljani. At the age of 8, he moved to Krško, where he was coached by Rok Zorko for seven years. He was part of the under-15 team that won the national championship in the 2013–14 season. In 2015, at the age of 16, Guček transferred to the academy of Spanish club Real Betis. Two years later, he returned to Slovenia and joined Domžale.

While playing for Domžale, he was loaned to the second division side Dob, where he made his senior debut during the 2018–19 season, making 29 appearances and scoring two goals. After the season, he joined Radomlje on a permanent basis.

In January 2023, Guček signed for Ukrainian side Chornomorets Odesa, playing in the Ukrainian Premier League. In the summer of 2024, he moved to fellow Ukrainian Premier League side Vorskla Poltava.

After two-and-a-half years in Ukraine, Guček returned to his homeland on 18 July 2025 and signed a one-year contract with Maribor, with the option for another year. He was assigned the number 29 shirt.

On 15 January 2026, Guček moved to Polish second division club Górnik Łęczna on a deal until the end of the season, with an option for a further year. On 12 June 2026, he was released in the wake of Górnik's relegation to the third tier.

== Career statistics ==
As of match played 24 May 2026

Appearances and goals by club, season and competition
Club	Season	League			National cup (Note: Includes Slovenian Cup, Ukrainian Cup)		Europe		Total	
Club	Season	Division	Apps	Goals	Apps	Goals	Apps	Goals	Apps	Goals
Domžale	2018–19	Slovenian PrvaLiga	0	0	0	0	—		0	0
Dob (loan)	2018–19	Slovenian Second League	29	2	0	0	—		29	2
Radomlje	2019–20	Slovenian Second League	19	1	3	1	—		22	2
Radomlje	2020–21	Slovenian Second League	18	1	2	0	—		20	1
Radomlje	2021–22	Slovenian PrvaLiga	35	1	2	0	—		37	1
Radomlje	2022–23	Slovenian PrvaLiga	9	0	1	0	—		10	0
Radomlje	Total		81	3	8	1	—		89	4
Chornomorets Odesa	2022–23	Ukrainian Premier League	10	0	0	0	—		10	0
Chornomorets Odesa	2023–24	Ukrainian Premier League	22	0	3	0	—		25	0
Chornomorets Odesa	Total		32	0	3	0	—		35	0
Vorskla Poltava	2024–25	Ukrainian Premier League	17	0	1	0	—		18	0
Maribor	2025–26	Slovenian PrvaLiga	2	0	1	0	1 (Note: Appearance in UEFA Conference League)	0	4	0
Górnik Łęczna	2025–26	I liga	13	1	—		—		13	1
Career total			174	6	13	1	1	0	188	7
