= Gašper Černe =

Slovenian footballer (born 2004)

Personal information
- Date of birth: 24 February 2004 (age 22)
- Position: Forward

Team information
- Current team: Krka

Youth career
- –2019: Krško
- 2019–2021: Domžale

Senior career*
Years	Team	Apps	(Gls)
2020–2025	Domžale	16	(1)
2022–2023	→ Dob (loan)	36	(13)
2024	→ Beltinci (loan)	10	(3)
2025	Ilirija 1911	14	(4)
2025–2026	Brinje Grosuplje	18	(5)
2026	Beltinci	5	(1)
2026–	Krka	0	(0)

International career
2018–2019	Slovenia U15	9	(4)
2019	Slovenia U16	8	(1)
2020	Slovenia U17	1	(0)
2021–2022	Slovenia U18	9	(0)
2021–2023	Slovenia U19	15	(5)
- * Club domestic league appearances and goals as of 8 September 2026

Gašper Černe (born 24 February 2004) is a Slovenian footballer who plays as a forward for Krka.

== Career statistics ==
=== Club ===
As of 10 October 2021

Appearances and goals by club, season and competition
Club	Season	League			National cup		Continental		Total	
Club	Season	Division	Apps	Goals	Apps	Goals	Apps	Goals	Apps	Goals
Domžale	2020–21	1. SNL	4	0	0	0	—		4	0
Domžale	2021–22	1. SNL	0	0	0	0	0	0	0	0
Domžale	Total		4	0	0	0	0	0	4	0
Career total			4	0	0	0	0	0	4	0
