= Anel Hajrić =

Slovenian footballer

Personal information
- Date of birth: 4 March 1996 (age 30)
- Place of birth: Šempeter v Savinjski Dolini, Slovenia
- Height: 1.95 m (6 ft 5 in)
- Position: Forward

Team information
- Current team: ASD Buccino Volcei

Youth career
- 2002–2011: Primorje
- 2011–2015: Maribor

Senior career*
| Years | Team | Apps | (Gls) |
| 2013–2018 | Maribor | 0 | (0) |
| 2014–2017 | Maribor B | 56 | (46) |
| 2016 | → Zarica Kranj (loan) | 10 | (5) |
| 2017–2018 | → Radomlje (loan) | 24 | (16) |
| 2018–2019 | Radomlje | 29 | (35) |
| 2019–2020 | Lokeren | 13 | (2) |
| 2020 | Željezničar | 7 | (0) |
| 2021 | Celje | 5 | (0) |
| 2021 | First Vienna | 5 | (0) |
| 2022 | SC Kalsdorf | 16 | (5) |
| 2022 | Triglav Kranj | 4 | (1) |
| 2022–2023 | Rogaška | 18 | (6) |
| 2023 | SV Flavia Solva | 1 | (0) |
| 2023– | ASD Buccino Volcei | | |

International career
| 2012 | Slovenia U16 | 3 | (0) |
| 2014 | Bosnia and Herzegovina U18 | | |
| 2014–2015 | Bosnia and Herzegovina U19 | | |
- * Club domestic league appearances and goals as of 27 October 2023

Anel Hajrić (born 4 March 1996) is a Bosnian footballer who plays for Italian team ASD Buccino Volcei as a forward.

== Career ==
In 2018, Hajrić signed for Radomlje in the Slovenian second division from Maribor, Slovenia's most successful team.

In June 2019, he signed for Lokeren in the Belgian second division. Hajrić left the club after the 2019–20 season as they went bankrupt, and signed for Bosnian top flight club Željezničar in June 2020.
