= 1992–93 Slovenian Second League =

Slovenian Second League
- Season: 1992–93
- Champions: Jadran Dekani
- Promoted: Jadran Dekani; Primorje
- Relegated: Tabor; Dravograd; Ilirija; Radomlje
- Matches played: 240
- Goals scored: 718 (2.99 per match)

The 1992–93 Slovenian Second League season started on 23 August 1992 and ended on 20 June 1993. Each team played a total of 30 matches.

== League standing ==
Pos	Team	Pld	W	D	L	GF	GA	GD	Pts	Promotion or relegation
1	Jadran Dekani (C, P)	30	21	5	4	75	30	+45	47	Promotion to Slovenian PrvaLiga
2	Primorje (P)	30	19	8	3	69	29	+40	46	Promotion to Slovenian PrvaLiga
3	Kočevje	30	16	8	6	53	34	+19	40	
4	Rudar Trbovlje	30	14	6	10	54	39	+15	34	
5	Triglav Kranj	30	12	10	8	43	34	+9	34	
6	Turnišče	30	12	7	11	52	41	+11	31	
7	Slavija Vevče	30	11	8	11	28	37	−9	30	
8	Domžale	30	10	9	11	50	54	−4	29	
9	Šmartno	30	10	8	12	36	41	−5	28	
10	Medvode	30	11	6	13	33	41	−8	28	
11	Korotan Prevalje	30	11	6	13	48	57	−9	28	
12	Dravinja	30	10	6	14	43	57	−14	26	
13	Tabor Sežana (R)	30	10	6	14	40	51	−11	26	Relegation to Slovenian Third League
14	Dravograd (R)	30	9	4	17	40	60	−20	22	Relegation to Slovenian Third League
15	Ilirija (R)	30	5	8	17	29	49	−20	18	Relegation to Slovenian Third League
16	Radomlje (R)	30	5	3	22	25	64	−39	13	Relegation to Slovenian Third League

(C) Champions; (P) Promoted; (R) Relegated

== See also ==
- 1992–93 Slovenian PrvaLiga
- 1992–93 Slovenian Third League
