= Ilan Bacha =

French association football player (born 2005)

Personal information
- Date of birth: 5 March 2005 (age 21)
- Place of birth: Saumur, France
- Height: 1.78 m (5 ft 10 in)
- Position: Midfielder

Team information
- Current team: Chantilly
- Number: 29

Youth career
- 2011–2018: Paris FC
- 2018–2019: Jeunesse Aubervilliers
- 2019–2022: Paris FC

Senior career*
Years	Team	Apps	(Gls)
2022–2024	Paris FC	1	(0)
2022–2024	Paris FC II	2	(0)
2024–2025	Koper	6	(0)
2025	→ Dekani (loan)	12	(1)
2025–	Chantilly	0	(0)
- * Club domestic league appearances and goals as of 13 December 2025

Ilan Bacha (born 5 March 2005) is a French professional footballer who plays as a midfielder for Championnat National 1 club Chantilly.

== Club career ==
Bacha is a youth product of Paris FC since 2011, and signed his first aspirant contract with the club on 18 December 2020. He made his professional debut with Paris FC in a 2–1 Ligue 2 loss to Toulouse on 2 April 2022.

== International career ==
Bacha was born in France and is of Algerian descent. He was called up to the France U16 in December 2020. He was called up to the Algeria U17s in February 2021.
