= Simon Dvoršak =

Slovenian footballer and manager (born 1974)

Personal information
- Date of birth: 16 March 1974 (age 52)
- Place of birth: Slovenia
- Height: 1.80 m (5 ft 11 in)
- Position: Midfielder

Team information
- Current team: Beltinci (head coach)

Senior career*
Years	Team	Apps	(Gls)
1992–1994	Maribor	16	(1)
1994–1996	Korotan Prevalje	45	(7)
1996–1997	Mura	30	(3)
1997–1998	Beltinci	36	(3)
1998–2000	Mura	56	(11)
2000–2001	Maribor	34	(3)
2001–2002	Mura	29	(5)
2002	Dravograd	3	(0)
2002–2003	Gorica	21	(4)
2003–2005	TSV Hartberg		
2005–2006	SK St. Andrä		
2006–2007	WAC/St. Andrä	33	(5)
2008–2010	SVL Flavia Solva	66	(25)
2010–2011	SC Kalsdorf	26	(4)
2011	Malečnik		
2012	USV St. Peter im Sulmtal	6	(0)
2013	Duplek		
2013–2016	SC St.Margarethen/Raab	18	(1)

Managerial career
- 2013–2016: SC St.Margarethen/Raab
- 2016–2017: USV Gabersdorf
- 2017: SV Wildon
- 2018: TUS Groß St Florian
- 2019–2022: Bistrica
- 2022: Rudar Velenje
- 2022–2023: Drava Ptuj
- 2023–2024: Bistrica
- 2024: FC Gamlitz
- 2024–: Beltinci
- * Club domestic league appearances and goals

Simon Dvoršak (born 16 March 1974) is a retired Slovenian footballer who played as a midfielder.
