= Miran Srebrnič =

Slovenian footballer and manager (born 1970)

Personal information
- Date of birth: 8 January 1970 (age 56)
- Place of birth: Nova Gorica, SR Slovenia, Yugoslavia

Team information
- Current team: Bilje (head coach)

Youth career
- Brda

Senior career*
Years	Team	Apps	(Gls)
–1993	Brda		
1993–2007	Gorica	400	(34)

International career
1996–1998	Slovenia	6	(0)

Managerial career
- 2008: Gorica (caretaker)
- 2009: Gorica
- 2011–2013: Gorica
- 2014: Gorica
- 2015–2018: Gorica
- 2019–2021: Koper
- 2021–2023: Gorica
- 2023–2024: Gorica
- 2024–2025: Rudar Velenje
- 2025–: Bilje
- * Club domestic league appearances and goals

Miran Srebrnič (born 8 January 1970) is a Slovenian professional football manager and former player who is the head coach of Bilje.

He played for Gorica between 1993 and 2007, making 400 appearances in the Slovenian PrvaLiga.

== International career ==
Srebrnič made six appearances for the Slovenia national team between 1996 and 1998.
