= NK Rogaška =

Slovenian football club

Rogaška
- Full name: Nogometni klub Rogaška
- Founded: 1999; 27 years ago
- Ground: Rogaška Slatina Sports Centre
- Capacity: 1,000
- President: Bojan Jeršečič
- Head coach: Ivan Zubić
- League: Intercommunal League
- 2025–26: 3. SNL – East, 11th of 14 (relegated)
- Website: nkrogaska.com
Home colours	Away colours

Nogometni klub Rogaška (English: Rogaška Football Club), commonly referred to as NK Rogaška or simply Rogaška, is a Slovenian football club based in Rogaška Slatina that competes in the MNZ Celje's Intercommunal League, the fourth tier of Slovenian football. Rogaška was founded in 1999 after the dissolution of NK Steklar, also from Rogaška Slatina, which folded a few months earlier due to bankruptcy. In the 2023–24 season, Rogaška competed in the Slovenian PrvaLiga, the top tier of Slovenian football, however, they were relegated at the end of the season for failing to obtain a competition licence. In the same season, the club won its first major trophy after winning the 2023–24 Slovenian Cup.

== Honours ==
League

- Slovenian Second League

Winners: 2022–23

- Slovenian Third League

Winners: 2020–21

- Slovenian Fourth Division

Winners: 2015–16, 2024–25

- Slovenian Fifth Division

Winners: 2013–14

Cup

- Slovenian Cup

Winners: 2023–24

== League history ==
Season	League	Position
1999–2000	MNZ Celje (level 4)	6th
2000–02	Didn't enter any competition.	
2002–03	MNZ Celje (level 4)	3rd
2003–04	MNZ Celje (level 4)	4th
2004–05	Styrian League	14th
2005–06	MNZ Celje (level 5)	2nd
2006–07	Styrian League	6th
2007–08	Styrian League	11th
2008–09	Styrian League	7th
2009–10	Styrian League	9th
2010–11	Styrian League	12th
2011–12	MNZ Celje (level 5)	2nd
2012–13	MNZ Celje (level 5)	4th
2013–14	MNZ Celje (level 5)	1st (Note: Styrian League discontinued, so they were effectively promoted from the fifth to the fourth level.)

Season	League	Position
2014–15	MNZ Celje (level 4)	7th
2015–16	MNZ Celje (level 4)	1st
2016–17	3. SNL – North	2nd
2017–18	2. SNL	13th
2018–19	2. SNL	10th
2019–20	2. SNL	15th
2020–21	3. SNL – East	1st
2021–22	2. SNL	4th
2022–23	2. SNL	1st
2023–24	1. SNL	8th
2024–25	MNZ Celje (level 4)	1st
2025–26	3. SNL – East	11th
2026–27	MNZ Celje (level 4)	
