= NK Nafta 1903 =

Slovenian football club

Nafta 1903
- Full name: Nogometno društvo Lendava 1903
- Nickname: Plavi (The Blues)
- Founded: 9 July 2012; 14 years ago
- Ground: Lendava Sports Park
- Capacity: 2,000
- President: Gábor Végh
- Head coach: Mere Hermoso
- League: Slovenian PrvaLiga
- 2025–26: Slovenian Second League, 2nd of 16 (promoted via play-offs)
- Website: www.nafta1903.si
Home colours	Away colours

Nogometni klub Nafta 1903 or simply NK Nafta 1903 is a Slovenian football club from Lendava which plays in the Slovenian PrvaLiga, the top tier of Slovenian football. The club was founded in 2012 as a phoenix club of NK Nafta Lendava, which disbanded the same year due to financial problems.

== Players ==
=== Current squad ===
As of 10 August 2026

Note: Flags indicate national team as defined under FIFA eligibility rules; some limited exceptions apply. Players may hold more than one non-FIFA nationality.

No.	Pos.	Nation	Player
1	GK	SLO	Lucas Erjavšek
2	DF	SLO	Rok Pirtovšek
7	MF	CRO	Josip Ivan Zorica
8	MF	NGR	Michael Ogwuche
10	MF	SLO	Luka Pihler
11	FW	SLO	Anis Jašaragić
14	MF	HUN	Noel Keresztes
17	FW	SLO	Amadej Maroša
18	MF	SLO	Aleks Pihler (captain)
19	DF	SLO	Blaž Sintič
20	DF	POR	André Ferreira
21	MF	CAN	Shyon Omrani
22	GK	SLO	Jure Ajhmajer

No.	Pos.	Nation	Player
23	DF	SLO	Luka Kambič
29	DF	SLO	Tibor Gorenc Stankovič
30	MF	HUN	Mátyás Vidnyánszky
33	DF	SLO	Luka Poredoš
41	MF	SLO	Kimi Lavrenčič
49	MF	SLO	Matic Habjanič
51	DF	SLO	Žiga Kosi
77	MF	SLO	Domen Brumec
89	GK	HUN	Ervin Németh
90	FW	NGR	Umar Jamiu (on loan from Tabor Sežana)
98	DF	HUN	Áron Dragóner
99	MF	CRO	Andrej Mićić (on loan from Osijek)
—	MF	NED	Divaio Bobson (on loan from Zalaegerszeg)

== Honours ==
- Slovenian Second League

Runners-up: 2023–24, 2025–26

- Slovenian Cup

Runners-up: 2019–20

- Slovenian Third League

Winners: 2016–17

- Pomurska League (fourth tier)

Winners: 2012–13

- MNZ Lendava Cup

Winners: 2015–16, 2016–17, 2017–18, 2018–19, 2019–20

== Domestic league and cup results ==
Season	Tier	League	Pos.	Pts	P	W	D	L	GF	GA	Cup
2012–13	4	Pomurska League	1↑	62	26	20	2	4	73	30	Did not qualify
2013–14	3	3. SNL – East	7	39	26	11	6	9	39	38	Did not qualify
2014–15	3	3. SNL – East	9	38	26	10	8	8	40	43	First round
2015–16	3	3. SNL – East	7	38	26	11	5	10	54	49	Did not qualify
2016–17	3	3. SNL – East	1↑	65	26	21	2	3	82	17	Round of 16
2017–18	2	2. SNL	3	64	30	20	4	6	69	28	First round
2018–19	2	2. SNL	5	50	30	14	8	8	52	35	Round of 16
2019–20	2	2. SNL	4	37	20	11	4	5	45	24	Runners-up
2020–21	2	2. SNL	3	44	22	13	5	4	60	26	Quarter-finals
2021–22	2	2. SNL	6	47	30	13	8	9	68	36	Did not qualify
2022–23	2	2. SNL	6	41	30	11	8	11	50	43	Round of 16
2023–24	2	2. SNL	2↑	58	30	18	4	8	55	31	Round of 16
2024–25	1	1. SNL	10↓	28	36	6	10	20	33	69	Quarter-finals
2025–26	2	2. SNL	2↑	75	30	23	6	1	65	23	Quarter-finals

Colour key

Winners	Runners-up	Promoted ↑	Relegated ↓
