= Nova Gorica Sports Park =

Sports venue in Nova Gorica, Slovenia

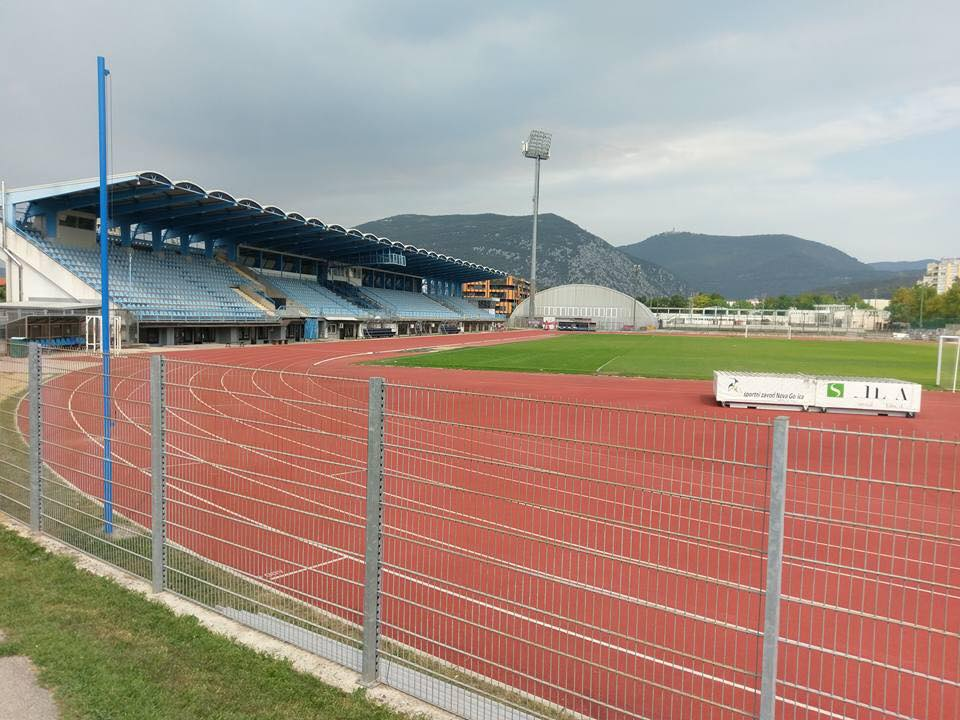
- Interactive map of Nova Gorica Sports Park
- Full name: Športni park Nova Gorica
- Location: Nova Gorica, Slovenia
- Coordinates: 45°57′21″N 13°38′29″E
- Owner: Urban Municipality of Nova Gorica
- Operator: Športni Zavod Nova Gorica
- Capacity: 3,100
- Surface: Grass
- Record attendance: 4,500
- Field size: 102.5 by 68 metres (112.1 yd × 74.4 yd)

Construction
- Opened: 1964
- Renovated: 1994, 2004, 2007

Tenants
- Gorica (1964–2026); Ankaran Hrvatini (2018); Primorje (2024)

Nova Gorica Sports Park (Slovene: Športni park Nova Gorica) is a multi-purpose sports venue in Nova Gorica, Slovenia. It is currently used mostly for football matches. The stadium was built in 1964 and has a capacity of 3,100 seats.

== International matches ==
Nova Gorica Sports Park has hosted two matches of the Slovenia national football team.

Date	Competition	Opponent	Result	Attendance
12 February 2003	Friendly	Switzerland	1–5	3,000
6 February 2008	Friendly	Denmark	1–2	1,500

== See also ==
- List of football stadiums in Slovenia
