= Rajko Štolfa Stadium =

Multi-purpose stadium in Sežana, Slovenia

- Interactive map of Rajko Štolfa Stadium
- Full name: Stadion Rajko Štolfa
- Former names: Mestni stadion Sežana
- Location: Sežana, Slovenia
- Coordinates: 45°42′21″N 13°52′18″E
- Owner: City of Sežana
- Operator: Zavod za šport, turizem in prosti čas Sežana
- Capacity: 1,310
- Surface: Grass
- Field size: 101 by 66 metres (110 by 72 yards)

Construction
- Groundbreaking: 1920
- Opened: 1920
- Renovated: 2000, 2016
- Cost: €1.2 million (2014 reconstruction)

Tenant
- NK Tabor Sežana

Rajko Štolfa Stadium (Slovene: Stadion Rajko Štolfa) is a multi-purpose stadium in Sežana, Slovenia. It is used mostly for football matches and is the home ground of the Slovenian Second League team NK Tabor Sežana. The stadium holds 1,310 spectators. It was known as Mestni stadion (English: City Stadium) in the past. Since 2003, the stadium is named after Rajko Štolfa, a football administrator from Sežana.

== See also ==
- List of football stadiums in Slovenia
