= NK Krka =

Association football club in Slovenia

Krka
- Full name: Nogometni klub Krka
- Nicknames: Farmacevti (The Pharmacists); Zeleni (The Greens)
- Founded: 19 February 1922; 104 years ago
- Ground: Portoval
- Capacity: 760
- President: Jože Berus
- Head coach: Oskar Drobne
- League: Slovenian Second League
- 2025–26: Slovenian Second League, 12th of 16
- Website: nkkrka.com
Home colours	Away colours

Nogometni klub Krka (English: Krka Football Club), commonly referred to as NK Krka or Krka, is a Slovenian football club based in Novo Mesto, that competes in the Slovenian Second League, the second tier of Slovenian football. The team plays its home games at Portoval. The club was founded in 1922 and was known as NK Elan in the past.

== Supporters ==
Krka supporters are called Trotters Novo mesto. They were established in 1988.

== Honours ==
- Slovenian Second League
  - Winners: 1991–92
- Slovenian Third League
  - Winners: 1996–97, 2006–07, 2011–12
- MNZ Ljubljana Cup
  - Winners: 1996–97, 1999–2000, 2010–11, 2012–13

== League history since 1991 ==
Season	League	Position
1991–92	2. SNL – West	1st
1992–93	1. SNL	7th
1993–94	1. SNL	16th
1994–95	2. SNL	16th
1995–96	3. SNL – West	5th
1996–97	3. SNL – West	1st
1997–98	2. SNL	5th
1998–99	2. SNL	10th
1999–2000	2. SNL	7th
2000–01	2. SNL	5th
2001–02	2. SNL	16th
2002–03	3. SNL – Centre	12th
2003–04	3. SNL – Centre	6th
2004–05	3. SNL – West	7th
2005–06	3. SNL – West	4th
2006–07	3. SNL – West	1st
2007–08	2. SNL	10th
2008–09	3. SNL – West	4th
2009–10	3. SNL – West	10th
2010–11	3. SNL – West	6th

Season	League	Position
2011–12	3. SNL – West	1st
2012–13	2. SNL	3rd
2013–14	1. SNL	9th
2014–15	1. SNL	7th
2015–16	1. SNL	10th
2016–17	2. SNL	7th
2017–18	2. SNL	5th
2018–19	2. SNL	4th
2019–20	2. SNL	7th
2020–21	2. SNL	2nd
2021–22	2. SNL	3rd
2022–23	2. SNL	4th
2023–24	2. SNL	13th
2024–25	2. SNL	8th
2025–26	2. SNL	12th

== See also ==
- ŽNK Krka – women's team
