= Stanko Mlakar Stadium =

Multi-purpose stadium in Kranj, Slovenia

- Interactive map of Stanko Mlakar Stadium
- Full name: Stadion Stanka Mlakarja
- Location: Kranj, Slovenia
- Coordinates: 46°15′6″N 14°21′53″E
- Owner: City of Kranj
- Operator: Kranj Institute of Sport
- Capacity: 2,060
- Record attendance: 5,000
- Field size: 105 by 66 metres (115 by 72 yards)

Construction
- Opened: 1963
- Renovated: 1998, 2009
- Expanded: 2009

Tenant
- Triglav Kranj

Stanko Mlakar Stadium (Slovene: Stadion Stanka Mlakarja), located in the Kranj Sports Centre (Slovene: Športni center Kranj), is a multi-purpose stadium in Kranj, Slovenia. It is mostly used for football matches and hosts the home matches of Triglav Kranj in the Slovenian Second League. In 2009, the stadium underwent a major reconstruction in which a new stand was built and the stadium now has a capacity of 2,060 seats.

== International matches ==
Slovenia national team matches
Date	Competition	Opponent	Result	Attendance
13 October 1993	Friendly	Macedonia	1–4	3,000

== See also ==
- List of football stadiums in Slovenia
