= Beltinci Sports Park =

Multi-purpose stadium in Beltinci, Slovenia

- Interactive map of Beltinci Sports Park
- Full name: Športni park Beltinci
- Location: Beltinci, Slovenia
- Coordinates: 46°36′27″N 16°13′45″E
- Capacity: 1,346
- Surface: Grass

Construction
- Opened: 1959
- Renovated: 2011
- Expanded: 1997

Tenants
- NK Beltinci (1961–2006); ND Beltinci (2007–present)

Beltinci Sports Park (Slovene: Športni park Beltinci) is a multi-purpose stadium in Beltinci, in the Prekmurje region of northeastern Slovenia. The stadium is used mostly for football matches and is the home ground of the Slovenian Second League team ND Beltinci.

== See also ==
- List of football stadiums in Slovenia
