= ND Primorje =

Slovenian football club

Primorje
- Full name: Nogometno društvo Primorje Ajdovščina
- Nicknames: Sinovi burje (The Sons of Bora); Rdeče-črni (The Red and Blacks)
- Founded: June 2011; 15 years ago (as DNŠ Ajdovščina)
- Ground: Ajdovščina City Stadium
- Capacity: 1,630
- President: Bojan Adžić
- Head coach: Anton Žlogar
- League: Slovenian Second League
- 2025–26: Slovenian PrvaLiga, 9th of 10 (relegated via play-offs)
- Website: ndprimorje.si
Home colours	Away colours

Nogometno društvo Primorje Ajdovščina or simply ND Primorje is a Slovenian football club based in Ajdovščina that competes in the Slovenian Second League, the second tier of the Slovenian football league system. The club was established in 2011 as the successor of defunct NK Primorje.

== History ==
The club was founded in June 2011 as DNŠ Ajdovščina after the dissolution of NK Primorje, a club from the same town which folded a month earlier due to high financial debt and after failing to obtain competition licences issued by the Football Association of Slovenia. They merged their first team with ŠD Škou before the beginning of the 2012–13 season. In the same season, the team gained promotion to the Slovenian Third League after finishing as runners-up of the 2012–13 Littoral League. In the 2014–15 season, the club won the West division of the Slovenian Third League. Following the season, they played in promotion play-offs for the Slovenian Second League, but lost 4–2 on aggregate to Zarica Kranj to miss out on promotion.

In 2018, the team started competing under the name ND Primorje and reintroduced the red and black team colours used by the now defunct NK Primorje.

In the 2023–24 season, Primorje became champions of the Slovenian Second League and were promoted to the Slovenian PrvaLiga, Slovenia's top division, 13 years after the previously disbanded club last played in the top tier.

== Stadium ==
The team play their home matches at Ajdovščina City Stadium, a 1,630 capacity stadium in Ajdovščina. The stadium was renovated during the 2009–10 season, and was reopened in September 2010.

== Honours ==
- Slovenian Second League
  - Winners: 2023–24
- Slovenian Third League
  - Winners: 2014–15
