= ND Beltinci =

Slovenian football club

Beltinci
- Full name: Nogometno društvo Beltinci
- Nickname: Žuti (The Yellows)
- Founded: 14 July 2006; 20 years ago (as ND Žuti Marki)
- Ground: Beltinci Sports Park
- Capacity: 1,346
- President: Janez Breznik
- Head coach: Simon Dvoršak
- League: Slovenian Second League
- 2025–26: Slovenian Second League, 4th of 16
- Website: www.ndbeltinci.net
Home colours	Away colours

Nogometno društvo Beltinci is a Slovenian football club from the town of Beltinci which plays in the Slovenian Second League, the second tier of Slovenian football. The club was established in 2006 as a phoenix club of NK Beltinci. They play their home games at the Beltinci Sports Park.

== Honours ==
League

- Slovenian Third League

Winners: 2015–16, 2017–18

- Pomurska League (fourth tier)

Winners: 2011–12

- Slovenian Sixth Division

Winners: 2007–08

Cup

- MNZ Murska Sobota Cup

Winners: 2015–16, 2018–19

== League history ==
Season	League	Position
2007–08	2. MNL (level 6)	1st
2008–09	1. MNL (level 5)	9th
2009–10	1. MNL (level 5)	8th
2010–11	1. MNL (level 5)	2nd
2011–12	Pomurska League	1st
2012–13	3. SNL – East	4th
2013–14	3. SNL – East	5th
2014–15	3. SNL – East	2nd
2015–16	3. SNL – East	1st (Note: Lost in promotion play-offs for the second division.)
2016–17	3. SNL – East	4th
2017–18	3. SNL – East	1st
2018–19	2. SNL	11th
2019–20	2. SNL	12th
2020–21	2. SNL	14th
2021–22	2. SNL	12th
2022–23	2. SNL	5th
2023–24	2. SNL	3rd
2024–25	2. SNL	10th
2025–26	2. SNL	4th
