= Lendava Sports Park =

Multi-use stadium in Lendava, Slovenia

- Interactive map of Lendava Sports Park
- Full name: Športni park Lendava
- Former names: Lendava City Stadium
- Location: Lendava, Slovenia
- Coordinates: 46°33′34″N 16°27′2″E
- Owner: Municipality of Lendava
- Capacity: 2,000
- Field size: 105 by 68 metres (115 by 74 yards)

Construction
- Built: 1946
- Renovated: 2006

Tenants
- NK Nafta Lendava (until 2012); NK Nafta 1903 (2012–present)

Lendava Sports Park (Slovene: Športni park Lendava) is a multi-use stadium in Lendava, Slovenia. It is currently used mostly for football matches and is the home ground of NK Nafta 1903. The stadium, initially built in 1946, was completely rebuilt in 2006 and has a capacity of 2,000 seats.

The stadium has a UEFA licence for international matches and is used as one of the venues for Slovenia's youth national teams.

== See also ==
- List of football stadiums in Slovenia
