= Portoval Stadium =

Multi-purpose stadium in Novo Mesto, Slovenia

Portoval
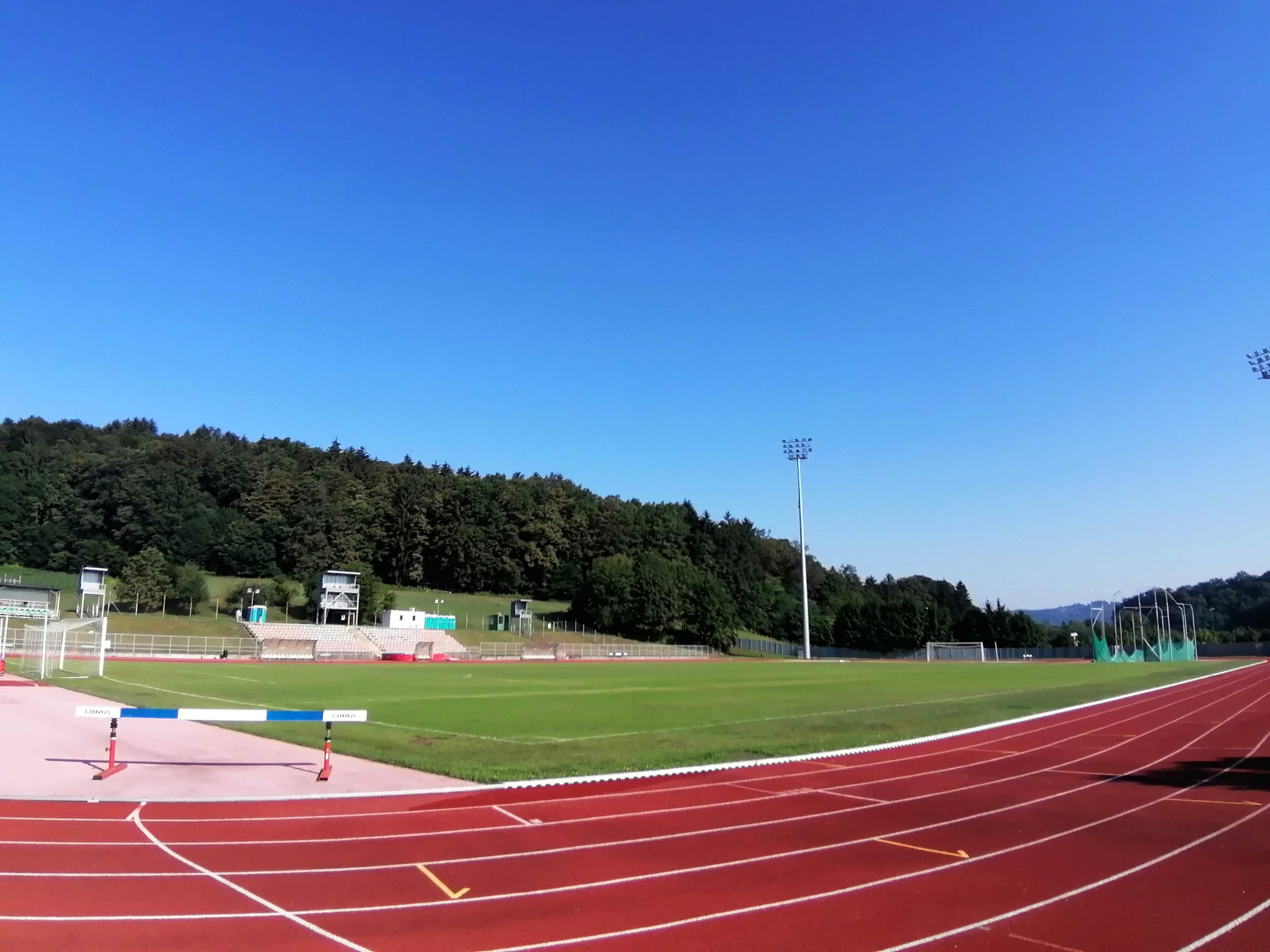
- Portoval in 2023, before the renovations
- Interactive map of Portoval
- Former names: Stadion bratstva in enotnosti
- Location: Novo Mesto, Slovenia
- Coordinates: 45°48′12″N 15°09′30″E
- Capacity: 760
- Surface: Grass

Construction
- Built: 1960
- Renovated: 1990, 2013, 2023–2024
- Expanded: 2023–2024

Tenant
- NK Krka

Portoval Stadium is a multi-purpose stadium in Novo Mesto, Slovenia. It is currently used mostly for football matches and is the home ground of NK Krka.

The stadium was built in 1960 and currently holds 1,000 spectators and has 760 seats. In 2024, the stadium was expanded and received a roof.
