= Ilirija Sports Park =

Slovenian multi-purpose sports stadium

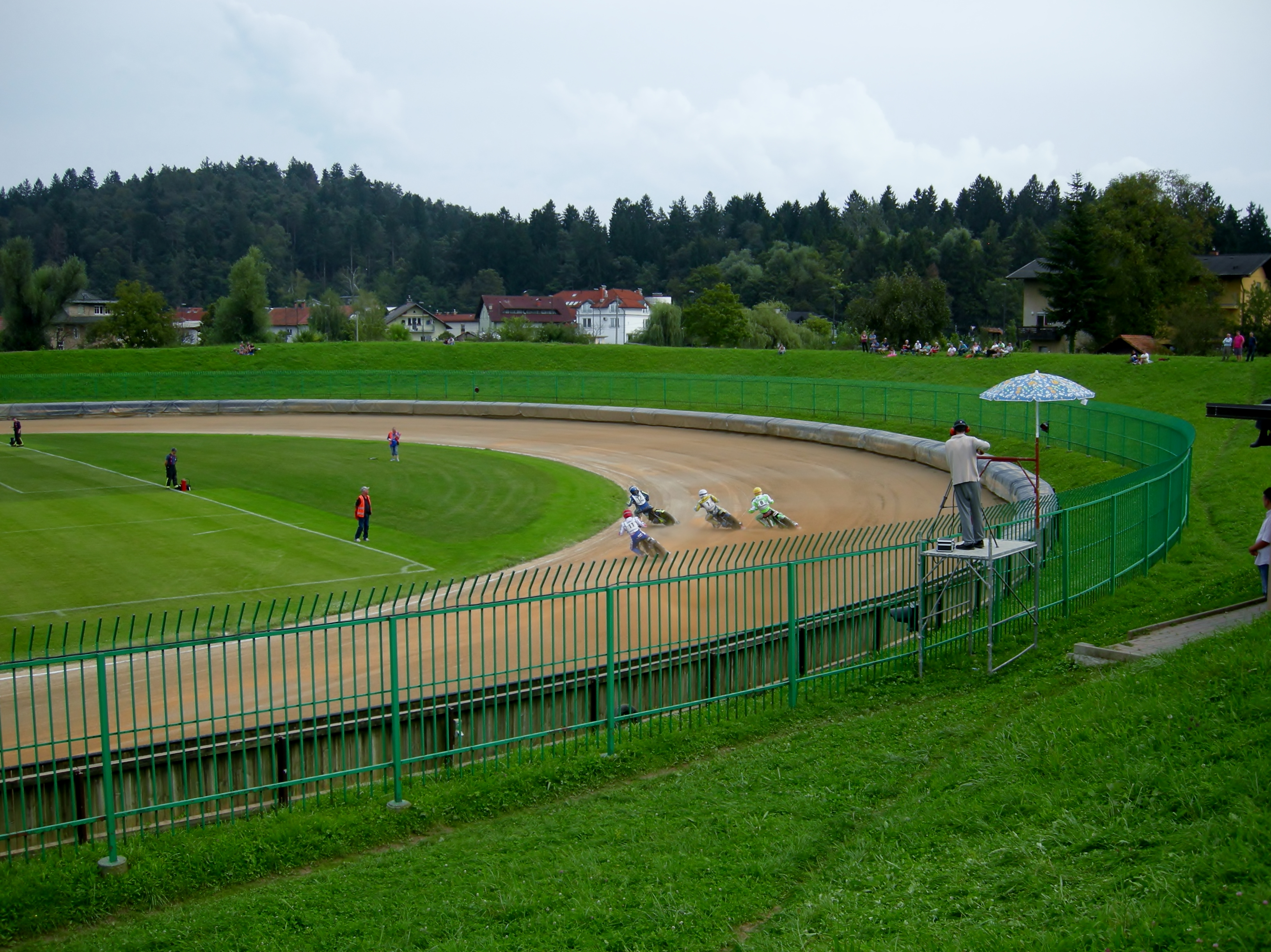
- The speedway track in 2014
- Interactive map of Ilirija Sports Park
- Location: Zgornja Šiška, Ljubljana, Slovenia
- Coordinates: 46°04′12″N 14°28′35″E
- Capacity: 1,000
- Surface: Grass

Construction
- Built: 1963

Tenant
- ND Ilirija 1911

Ilirija Sports Park (Slovene: Športni park Ilirija) is a multi-purpose stadium in Ljubljana, the capital of Slovenia. It is the home ground of the Slovenian Second League team ND Ilirija 1911. The motorcycle speedway team Avto Moto Touring Klub (AMTK) Ljubljana used the speedway track at this venue as its home ground until 2020.

== History ==
The stadium was built in 1963 with a 398 metres (1,306 ft) long speedway track. The first speedway event took place on 9 June 1963 in front of 10,000 spectators.

The speedway track hosted major competitions, including rounds of the Speedway World Team Cup in 1987, 1990, 1992, 1994, 1996, 2001, 2008 and 2012, and rounds of the Speedway World Pairs Championship in 1979, 1983 and 1989.

The speedway club AMTK Ljubljana underwent a long legal dispute with the City Municipality of Ljubljana over the ownership of the site. AMTK had not registered as the owner of the land in the mortgage registry, as a result of which they had to sign a lease agreement for the use of the facility. The Federation of Ilirija Sports Associations eventually became the owner of the venue, and in May 2020 the speedway club was expelled following the expiry of the lease.

== See also ==
- List of football stadiums in Slovenia
