= Dekani =

Dekani Villa Decani Pasja vas (local name)
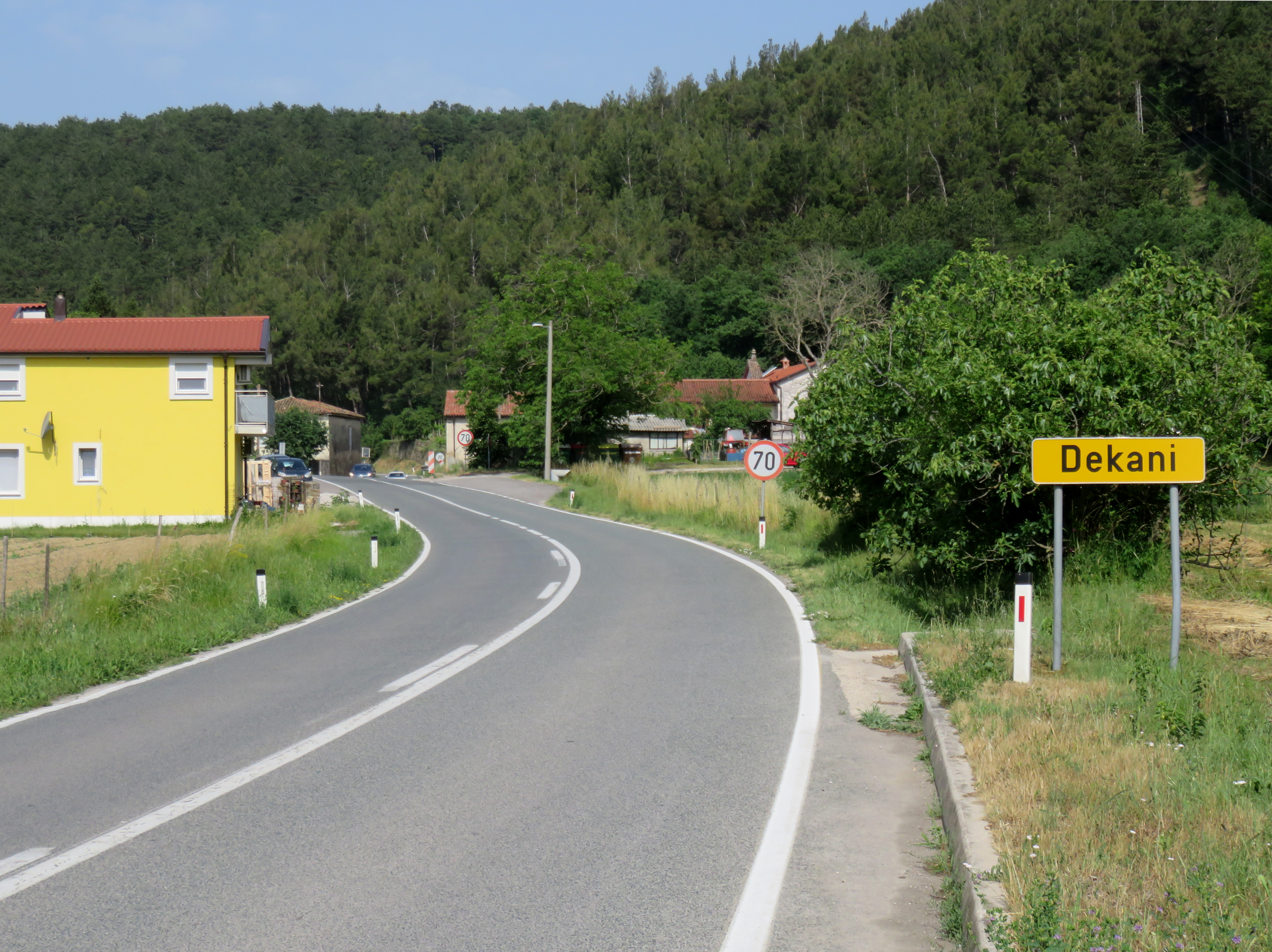

- Location in Slovenia
- Coordinates: 45°32′48.95″N 13°48′52.54″E
- Country: Slovenia
- Traditional region: Littoral
- Statistical region: Coastal–Karst
- Municipality: Koper

Area
  - Total: 6.01 km^{2} (2.32 sq mi)
- Elevation: 76.1 m (250 ft)

Population (2002)
  - Total: 1,409

Dekani (pronounced [dɛˈkaːni]; Italian: Villa Decani) is a settlement in the City Municipality of Koper in the Littoral region of Slovenia.

== Name ==
Dekani was first attested in written sources in 1328 as Decani (and in 1423 as Villae Canis). The name is derived from the noble family de Cani. Locally, the name was misunderstood as derived from Italian cane 'dog', leading to the local designation Pasja vas (literally, 'dog village'), the demonym Pesjan, and the associated adjective pesjanski. Another theory, according to Salvator Žitko of the University of Koper, is that the settlement got its name after its owner, the Albanian nobleman Giovanni Dukagjini, in 1480 based on the Venetian archives of the city of Koper.

== Church ==
The local church is dedicated to the Assumption of Mary, and was originally built in 1229 and remodeled at the end of the 15th century.

== See also ==
- List of Glagolitic inscriptions (16th century)
