= NK Brinje Grosuplje =

Slovenian football club

Brinje Grosuplje
- Full name: Nogometni klub Brinje Grosuplje
- Founded: 3 July 2003; 22 years ago
- Ground: Brinje Football Park
- Capacity: 492
- President: Andraž Zrnec
- Head coach: Goran Markovič
- League: Slovenian PrvaLiga
- 2025–26: Slovenian Second League, 1st of 16 (promoted)
- Website: www.nogometniklub-brinje.si
Home colours	Away colours

Nogometni klub Brinje Grosuplje (English: Brinje Grosuplje Football Club), commonly referred to as Brinje Grosuplje, is a Slovenian football club based in the town of Grosuplje. As of 2026–27, they play in the Slovenian PrvaLiga, the top tier of Slovenian football.

NK Brinje Grosuplje was founded in 2003. The club is legally not considered to be the successor of NK Grosuplje and the statistics and honours of the two clubs are kept separate by the Football Association of Slovenia.

== Honours ==
- Slovenian Second League
  - Winners: 2025–26
- Slovenian Third League (West)
  - Winners: 2021–22
- Slovenian Football Cup
  - Runners-up: 2025–26
