= ND Bilje =

Slovenian football club

Bilje
- Full name: Nogometno društvo Bilje
- Nicknames: Črno-beli (The Black and Whites)
- Founded: 1946; 80 years ago
- Ground: Stadion V dolinci
- Capacity: 300
- President: Sebastjan Komel
- Head coach: Miran Srebrnič
- League: Slovenian Second League
- 2025–26: Slovenian Second League, 9th of 16
- Website: ndbilje.si
Home colours	Away colours

Nogometno društvo Bilje, commonly referred to as ND Bilje or simply Bilje, is a Slovenian football club from Bilje. As of the 2024–25 season, they compete in the Slovenian Second League, the second-highest football league in Slovenia. The club was founded in 1946.

== Honours ==
- Slovenian Third League
  - Winners (1): 2017–18
- Slovenian Fourth Division
  - Winners (3): 1999–2000, 2011–12, 2013–14
- MNZ Nova Gorica Cup
  - Winners (2): 1993–94, 2017–18
