= Slovenian Second League =

- Organising body: Football Association of Slovenia
- Founded: 1991; 35 years ago
- Country: Slovenia
- Number of clubs: 16
- Level on pyramid: 2
- Promotion to: Slovenian PrvaLiga
- Relegation to: Slovenian Third League
- Current champions: Brinje Grosuplje (1st title) (2025–26)
- Most championships: Aluminij; Rudar Velenje; Triglav Kranj (3 titles each)
- Broadcaster: Sportklub
- Website: nzs.si

The Slovenian Second Football League (Slovene: Druga slovenska nogometna liga), also known by the abbreviation 2. SNL, is the second highest football league in Slovenia. The league was formed in 1991 and is operated by the Football Association of Slovenia.

== Format and rules ==
In its inaugural edition in 1991–92, the Slovenian Second League was divided into two regional groups (East and West), with both winners directly promoted to the Slovenian PrvaLiga. In 1992, a unified league was formed, with 16 clubs playing the round-robin system, which lasted until 2003. Two clubs were usually promoted, while the number of those relegated varied with the number of divisions in the Slovenian Third League. In 2003, the league was reduced to twelve teams, and only the champion was directly promoted to the top tier, as an additional promotion play-off was introduced for the second-placed team. In 2005, the league was further reduced to ten teams playing a triple round-robin format.

In 2017, the competition returned to the old system with 16 clubs, used between 1992 and 2003. Each club plays every other club twice, once at home and once away, for a total of 30 matchdays. Teams receive three points for a win, one point for a draw, and no points for a loss. The winner is promoted to the Slovenian PrvaLiga, the second-placed team enters the promotion play-offs, and the bottom two teams are relegated to the Slovenian Third League.

== 2026–27 teams ==
- Beltinci
- Bilje
- Bistrica
- Brežice 1919
- Dravinja
- Ilirija 1911
- Jadran Dekani
- Jesenice
- Krka
- Krško Posavje
- Primorje
- Rudar Velenje
- Slovan
- Tabor Sežana
- Triglav Kranj
- Vrhnika

== Winners ==
| Season | | Champions | Runners-up | Third place |
|---|---|---|---|---|
| 1991–92 | East | Železničar Maribor | Dravograd | Turnišče |
| 1991–92 | West | Krka | Triglav Kranj | Ilirija |
| 1992–93 | | Jadran Dekani | Primorje | Kočevje |
| 1993–94 | | Kočevje | Korotan Prevalje | Turnišče |
| 1994–95 | | Šmartno | Nafta Lendava | Zagorje |
| 1995–96 | | Železničar Ljubljana | Nafta Lendava | Črnuče |
| 1996–97 | | Vevče | Drava Ptuj | Dravograd |
| 1997–98 | | Triglav Kranj | Koper | Domžale |
| 1998–99 | | Dravograd | Pohorje | Železničar Maribor |
| 1999–2000 | | Koper | Tabor Sežana | Šmartno |
| 2000–01 | | Triglav Kranj | Šmartno | Aluminij |
| 2001–02 | | Dravograd | Ljubljana | Aluminij |
| 2002–03 | | Domžale | Drava Ptuj | Aluminij |
| 2003–04 | | Rudar Velenje | Bela Krajina | Zagorje |
| 2004–05 | | Rudar Velenje | Nafta Lendava | Svoboda |
| 2005–06 | | Factor | Dravinja | Triglav Kranj |
| 2006–07 | | Livar | Bonifika | Krško |
| 2007–08 | | Rudar Velenje | Bonifika | Bela Krajina |
| 2008–09 | | Olimpija | Aluminij | Triglav Kranj |
| 2009–10 | | Primorje | Triglav Kranj | Aluminij |
| 2010–11 | | Aluminij | Interblock | Dravinja |
| 2011–12 | | Aluminij | Dob | Šenčur |
| 2012–13 | | Zavrč | Dob | Krka |
| 2013–14 | | Dob | Radomlje | Aluminij |
| 2014–15 | | Krško | Aluminij | Dob |
| 2015–16 | | Radomlje | Aluminij | Drava Ptuj |
| 2016–17 | | Triglav Kranj | Dob | Ankaran |
| 2017–18 | | Mura | Drava Ptuj | Nafta 1903 |
| 2018–19 | | Bravo | Tabor Sežana | Radomlje |
| 2019–20 | | Cancelled (Note: The season was interrupted in March 2020 and later cancelled due to the COVID-19 pandemic in Slovenia, and the winners were not announced. Koper and Gorica, the top two teams before the cancellation of the season, were promoted to the top division.) | | |
| 2020–21 | | Radomlje | Krka | Nafta 1903 |
| 2021–22 | | Gorica | Triglav Kranj | Krka |
| 2022–23 | | Rogaška | Aluminij | Ilirija 1911 |
| 2023–24 | | Primorje | Nafta 1903 | Beltinci |
| 2024–25 | | Aluminij | Triglav Kranj | Gorica |
| 2025–26 | | Brinje Grosuplje | Nafta 1903 | Triglav Kranj |

=== Top scorers ===
| Season | Player | Goals | Club |
|---|---|---|---|
| 1992–93 | (Slovenia) Miloš Breznikar | 31 | Jadran Dekani |
| 1993–94 | (Slovenia) Milan Osterc | 20 | Veržej |
| 1994–95 | (Slovenia) Tomi Druškovič | 26 | Šmartno |
| 1995–96 | (Slovenia) Marjan Dominko (Slovenia) Oskar Drobne | 19 | Nafta Lendava; Šentjur |
| 1996–97 | (Slovenia) Anton Usnik | 15 | Ljubljana / Vevče |
| 1997–98 | (Slovenia) Oliver Bogatinov | 32 | Triglav Kranj |
| 1998–99 | (Slovenia) Alen Mujanovič | 18 | Šmartno |
| 1999–2000 | (Slovenia) Milan Emeršič | 21 | Aluminij |
| 2000–01 | (Slovenia) Borut Arlič | 22 | Šmartno |
| 2001–02 | (Slovenia) Matej Rebol | 23 | Dravograd |
| 2002–03 | (Slovenia) Matjaž Majcen | 26 | Drava Ptuj |
| 2003–04 | (Slovenia) Ismet Ekmečić | 30 | Rudar Velenje |
| 2004–05 | (Slovenia) Mirnes Ibrahimovič | 32 | Rudar Velenje |
| 2005–06 | (Serbia) Živojin Vidojević | 15 | Dravinja |
| 2006–07 | (Slovenia) Dejan Božičič (Slovenia) Dalibor Volaš | 14 | Zagorje; Bonifika |
| 2007–08 | (Slovenia) Alen Mujanovič | 21 | Rudar Velenje |
| 2008–09 | (Slovenia) Dejan Burgar | 16 | Triglav Kranj |
| 2009–10 | (Slovenia) Darko Kremenović | 15 | Primorje |
| 2010–11 | (Slovenia) Ladislav Stanko | 16 | Šenčur / Dob |
| 2011–12 | (Slovenia) Goran Vuk | 17 | Dob |
| 2012–13 | (Croatia) Josip Golubar (Slovenia) Amer Krcić | 13 | Zavrč; Dob |
| 2013–14 | (Slovenia) Marko Nunić | 16 | Šenčur |
| 2014–15 | (Slovenia) Matej Poplatnik | 18 | Triglav Kranj |
| 2015–16 | (Slovenia) Lovro Bizjak (Slovenia) Dejan Sokanović | 14 | Aluminij; Tolmin |
| 2016–17 | (Slovenia) Matej Poplatnik | 27 | Triglav Kranj |
| 2017–18 | (Croatia) Marko Roginić | 21 | Nafta 1903 |
| 2018–19 | (Bosnia and Herzegovina) Anel Hajrić | 35 | Radomlje |
| 2019–20 | Not awarded | | |
| 2020–21 | (Jamaica) Kaheem Parris | 16 | Krka |
| 2021–22 | (Croatia) Tin Matić | 21 | Triglav Kranj |
| 2022–23 | (Slovenia) Matej Poplatnik | 24 | Ilirija 1911 |
| 2023–24 | (Slovenia) Toni Lun Bončina | 17 | Nafta 1903 |
| 2024–25 | (Russia) Stanislav Krapukhin | 19 | Bistrica |
| 2025–26 | (Slovenia) Murat Bajraj | 22 | Beltinci |

== Awards ==
Player of the Year awards were presented by the Union of Professional Football Players of Slovenia (SPINS).

- 2017–18: Luka Bobičanec
- 2018–19: Anel Hajrić
- 2019–20: Not awarded
