= NK Dekani =

Slovenian football club

Jadran Dekani
- Full name: Nogometni klub Jadran Dekani
- Nickname: Pesjani (The Scoundrels)
- Founded: 1938; 88 years ago
- Ground: Igrišče Ivan Gregorič
- Capacity: 400
- President: Marko Drljić
- Head coach: Alen Ščulac
- League: Slovenian Second League
- 2025–26: Slovenian Second League, 10th of 16
Home colours	Away colours

Nogometni klub Jadran Dekani, commonly referred to as Jadran Dekani or simply Dekani, is a Slovenian football club from Dekani which plays in the Slovenian Second League, the second tier of Slovenian football. The club was founded in 1938.

== Honours ==
- Slovenian Second League
  - Winners: 1992–93
