= Beltinci =

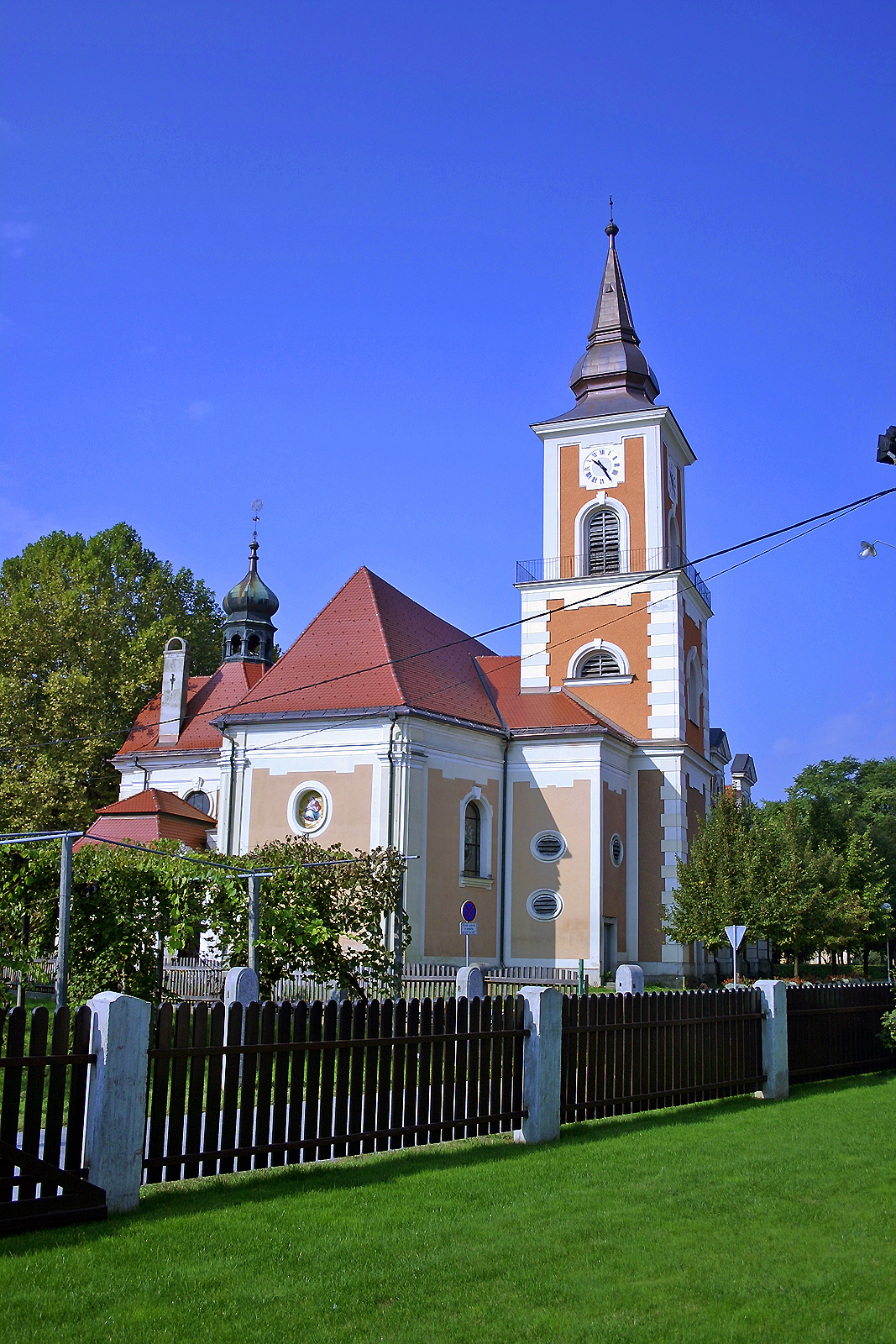
- St. Ladislaus' Church in Beltinci

- Flag Seal

- Location in Slovenia
- Coordinates: 46°36′21.64″N 16°13′58.23″E
- Country: Slovenia
- Traditional region: Prekmurje
- Statistical region: Mura
- Municipality: Beltinci

Area
  - Total: 12.2 km^{2} (4.7 sq mi)
- Elevation: 177.8 m (583 ft)

Population (2020)
  - Total: 2,430
  - Density: 199/km^{2} (516/sq mi)

Beltinci (pronounced [ˈbeːltintsi]; Prekmurje Slovene: Böltinci, Hungarian: Belatinc or Belatincz, German: (Alt)Fellsdorf) is a town in the Prekmurje region of northeastern Slovenia. It is the seat of the Municipality of Beltinci. Črnec Creek, a tributary of the Ledava, flows through the settlement.

== Name ==
Beltinci was attested as Belethfalua in 1322, Belethafalua in 1381, and Balatincz in 1402. The name is originally a plural demonym derived from the Slavic personal name *Běletinъ—from the nickname *Bělъ(jъ) 'white', applied to people with fair skin or hair—thus meaning 'residents of Běletinъ's village'. The second e in the reconstructed name *Beletinci was lost in Slovene due to syncope.

== Jewish community ==
Until 1937, there was a Jewish Orthodox synagogue in Beltinci. It was built in 1860 and served the local Jewish community. On April 26, 1944, all of the Jews of the town were deported to the Auschwitz extermination camp, from which none of them returned.

== Church ==
The parish church in the settlement is dedicated to Saint Ladislaus and belongs to the Roman Catholic Diocese of Murska Sobota. It dates from 1742 with late 19th-century alterations.

== Demographics ==
Population by native language, 2002 census

- Slovene: 1,969
- Hungarian: 247
- Romany: 73
- Croatian: 49
- Albanian: 12
- Serbian: 9
- Serbo-Croatian: 7
- Other: 12
