= NK Tabor Sežana =

Slovenian football club

Tabor Sežana
- Full name: Nogometni klub Tabor Sežana
- Nicknames: Rdeče-črni (The Red-Blacks); Češnjice (The Cherries)
- Founded: 1923; 103 years ago (as Mladinsko društvo Tabor-Sežana)
- Ground: Rajko Štolfa Stadium
- Capacity: 1,310
- President: Davor Škerjanc
- Head coach: Darijan Matić
- League: Slovenian Second League
- 2025–26: Slovenian Second League, 5th of 16
- Website: www.nktabor.si
Home colours

Nogometni klub Tabor Sežana, commonly referred to as Tabor Sežana or simply Tabor, is a Slovenian football club from Sežana which plays in the Slovenian Second League, the second tier of Slovenian football. The club was established in 1923.

== History ==
In 1923, Mladinsko društvo Tabor-Sežana was founded, led and organized by the publicist and politician Ivan Regent. Four years later, in 1927, the Italian fascist authorities banned the club. Therefore, the club was inactive for the next 18 years, until it was revived in 1945 after World War II. Initially, Sežana competed in the Trieste League (Zone A), but moved to the Littoral League in the Yugoslav football pyramid after the Free Territory of Trieste was established in 1947. During the 1950s, the club was named Železničar and competed in the Ljubljana-Littoral League.

Between 1965 and 1971 they competed in the Slovenian Zonal League – West, which was the fourth level in Yugoslavia and the second level in the Socialist Republic of Slovenia, before being relegated back to the Littoral League. In 1975–76, the team reached the final of the Slovenian Republic Cup, where they lost against Mercator Ljubljana over two legs. In the 1981–82 season, the club, competing under the sponsorship name Tabor Jadran, won the Slovenian Zonal League – West and qualified for the Slovenian Republic League for the first time. However, they were relegated in their first season after finishing 13th out of 14 teams.

After Slovenia's independence in 1991, Tabor competed in the newly established Slovenian Second League (2. SNL), the second tier of Slovenian football. In 1992–93, they were relegated from the second division. After winning the 3. SNL – West in 1997–98, they returned to the second level. In 1999–2000, Tabor were promoted to the Slovenian PrvaLiga, the top flight of Slovenian football, after finishing their 2. SNL season in second place, only behind Koper. They were immediately relegated after finishing last in the 2000–01 Slovenian PrvaLiga season. During the 2003–04 Second League season, the club withdrew from the league and went bankrupt. They started at the bottom of the football pyramid under the name Mladinsko nogometno društvo Tabor. Until 2012, they competed in the fourth tier Littoral League (with the exception of 2008–09, when they played in the third tier and again withdrew during the season). By 2017, Tabor was promoted back to the second division. In June 2019, they defeated Gorica in the promotion/relegation play-offs over two legs, and returned to the top flight for the first time since 2001.

== Honours ==
Yugoslavia

- Slovenian Zonal League – West (fourth tier)
  - Winners: 1981–82

Slovenia

- Slovenian Third League
  - Winners: 1997–98, 2016–17
- Littoral League (fourth tier)
  - Winners: 2007–08
