= 2021–22 NŠ Mura season =

Mura
2021–22 season
- Manager: Ante Šimundža (until 28 December); Damir Čontala (from 28 December)
- Stadium: Fazanerija City Stadium
- Slovenian PrvaLiga: 4th
- Slovenian Football Cup: Quarter-finals
- UEFA Champions League: Second qualifying round
- UEFA Europa League: Play-off round
- UEFA Europa Conference League: Group stage

The 2021–22 season was Nogometna šola Mura's 9th competitive season, 4th consecutive season in the Slovenian PrvaLiga and 10th year in existence as a football club. In addition to the domestic league, Mura participated in that season's editions of the Slovenian Football Cup, the UEFA Champions League, the UEFA Europa League and the UEFA Europa Conference League.

== Squad ==
Squad at end of season

Note: Flags indicate national team as defined under FIFA eligibility rules; some limited exceptions apply. Players may hold more than one non-FIFA nationality.

| No. | Pos. | Nation | Player |
|---|---|---|---|
| 1 | GK | CRO | Marin Ljubić |
| 2 | DF | SLO | Kai Cipot |
| 3 | DF | SLO | Klemen Pucko |
| 4 | DF | SLO | Gregor Balažic |
| 6 | DF | BIH | Amar Beganović |
| 7 | MF | SLO | Alen Kozar |
| 8 | MF | CRO | Luka Bobičanec |
| 9 | MF | SLO | Matic Maruško |
| 10 | MF | SLO | Tomi Horvat |
| 11 | DF | SLO | Žiga Kous |
| 13 | DF | CRO | Marin Karamarko |
| 14 | MF | SLO | Nik Lorbek |
| 17 | FW | KOS | Mirlind Daku |

| No. | Pos. | Nation | Player |
|---|---|---|---|
| 19 | FW | BIH | Nardin Mulahusejnović |
| 20 | FW | SLO | Niko Kasalo |
| 21 | DF | SLO | Miha Kompan Breznik |
| 22 | DF | SLO | Tilen Ščernjavič |
| 23 | DF | SLO | Klemen Šturm |
| 24 | MF | SLO | Tio Cipot |
| 27 | FW | SLO | Žiga Škoflek |
| 30 | DF | SLO | Jan Gorenc |
| 32 | MF | TOG | Samsondin Ouro |
| 33 | FW | SLO | Mitja Lotrič |
| 47 | FW | CRO | Mihael Klepač |
| 69 | GK | CRO | Matko Obradović |
| 90 | GK | SLO | Marko Zalokar |

== Competitions ==
=== Overview ===
| Competition | First match | Last match | Starting round | Final position | Record | | | | | | | |
| Competition | First match | Last match | Starting round | Final position | Pld | W | D | L | GF | GA | GD | Win % |
|---|---|---|---|---|---|---|---|---|---|---|---|---|
| Slovenian PrvaLiga | 17 July 2021 | 22 May 2022 | Matchday 1 | 4th | 36 | 15 | 12 | 9 | 57 | 50 | +7 | 41.67 |
| Slovenian Football Cup | 27 October 2021 | 27 October 2021 | Quarter-finals | Quarter-finals | 1 | 0 | 1 | 0 | 1 | 1 | +0 | 0.00 |
| UEFA Champions League | 6 July 2021 | 28 July 2021 | First qualifying round | Second qualifying round | 4 | 2 | 1 | 1 | 7 | 3 | +4 | 50.00 |
| UEFA Europa League | 5 August 2021 | 26 August 2021 | Third qualifying round | Play-off round | 4 | 1 | 1 | 2 | 2 | 5 | −3 | 25.00 |
| UEFA Europa Conference League | 16 September 2021 | 9 December 2021 | Group stage | Group stage | 6 | 1 | 0 | 5 | 5 | 14 | −9 | 16.67 |
| Total | | | | | 51 | 19 | 15 | 17 | 72 | 73 | −1 | 37.25 |

Source: Competitions

=== Slovenian PrvaLiga ===
==== League table ====
| Pos | Team | Pld | W | D | L | GF | GA | GD | Pts | Qualification or relegation |
|---|---|---|---|---|---|---|---|---|---|---|
| 2 | Koper | 36 | 19 | 10 | 7 | 54 | 38 | +16 | 67 | Qualification for the Europa Conference League second qualifying round |
| 3 | Olimpija Ljubljana | 36 | 18 | 8 | 10 | 53 | 38 | +15 | 62 | Qualification for the Europa Conference League first qualifying round |
| 4 | Mura | 36 | 15 | 12 | 9 | 57 | 50 | +7 | 57 | Qualification for the Europa Conference League first qualifying round |
| 5 | Bravo | 36 | 13 | 10 | 13 | 33 | 33 | 0 | 49 | |
| 6 | Radomlje | 36 | 12 | 10 | 14 | 47 | 52 | −5 | 46 | |

Source: PrvaLiga
Rules for classification: 1) Points; 2) Head-to-head points; 3) Head-to-head goal difference; 4) Head-to-head goals scored; 5) Goal difference; 6) Goals scored

==== Results summary ====
| Overall | | | | | | | | Home | | | | | | Away | | | | | |
| Pld | W | D | L | GF | GA | GD | Pts | W | D | L | GF | GA | GD | W | D | L | GF | GA | GD |
|---|---|---|---|---|---|---|---|---|---|---|---|---|---|---|---|---|---|---|---|
| 36 | 15 | 12 | 9 | 57 | 50 | +7 | 57 | 10 | 4 | 4 | 31 | 24 | +7 | 5 | 8 | 5 | 26 | 26 | 0 |

Source: Soccerway

==== Matches ====
| 17 July 2021 1 | Mura | 0–3 | Tabor Sežana | Murska Sobota |
| 20:15 CEST (UTC+2) | Bobičanec (yellow card) 90+2' | Report | Stančič 10', 60'; Krivičić (yellow card) 21', (goal) 57' (pen.); Briški (yellow card) 44'; Ndzengue (yellow card) 67'; Makoumbou (yellow card) 90+2' | Stadium: Fazanerija City Stadium; Referee: Matej Jug; Assistant referees: Grega Kordež, Matej Žunič; Fourth official: Dejan Balažič |

| 24 July 2021 2 | Koper | 3–2 | Mura | Koper |
| 20:15 CEST (UTC+2) | Mulahusejnović 13'; Parris 39'; Bručić (yellow card) 46'; Barišič 62'; Oštrek (yellow card) 90+3' | Report | Cipot 1', 48'; Pucko (yellow card) 64'; Maruško (yellow card) 78' | Stadium: Bonifika Stadium; Referee: Alen Borošak; Assistant referees: Uroš Benc, Jure Praprotnik; Fourth official: Asmir Sagrković |

| 31 July 2021 3 | Mura | 1–1 | Bravo | Murska Sobota |
| 17:00 CEST (UTC+2) | Maroša 49'; Lorbek (yellow card) 88' | Report | Memić (yellow card) 5'; Trdin (yellow card) 22'; Trontelj (yellow card) 32'; Maružin 78' | Stadium: Fazanerija City Stadium; Referee: Roberto Ponis; Assistant referees: Robert Šprah, Manuel Vidali; Fourth official: Mihael Antič |

| 8 August 2021 4 | Aluminij | 1–1 | Mura | Kidričevo |
| 20:15 CEST (UTC+2) | Bizjak (yellow card) 12'; Kadrić 31' | Report | Lotrič 21'; Bobičanec (yellow card) 85'; Škoflek (yellow card) 88' | Stadium: Aluminij Sports Park; Referee: Slavko Vinčić; Assistant referees: Tomaž Klančnik, Andraž Kovačič; Fourth official: Dejan Balažič |

| 22 August 2021 6 | Mura | 1–0 | Celje | Murska Sobota |
| 20:15 CEST (UTC+2) | Pucko (yellow card) 80'; Gorenc (red card) 85'; Cipot 90' | Report | Brecl (yellow card) 45+2'; Kadušić (yellow card) 47'; Sokler (yellow card) 53'; Medved (yellow card) 59'; Mayewski (yellow card) 85'; Žižek (red card) 85' | Stadium: Fazanerija City Stadium; Referee: Roman Glažar; Assistant referees: Alen Salkić, Žiga Šumer; Fourth official: Denis Šabanagić |

| 29 August 2021 7 | Domžale | 4–1 | Mura | Domžale |
| 17:00 CEST (UTC+2) | Ibričić 8' (pen.); Pišek (yellow card) 13'; Klemenčič 37', (yellow card) 81'; Jakupović 58', 90+2' | Report | Horvat 32'; Maroša (yellow card) 79'; Karničnik (yellow card) 84' | Stadium: Domžale Sports Park; Referee: Nejc Kajtazović; Assistant referees: David Gabrovec, Aleksandar Kasapović; Fourth official: David Šmajc |

| 3 September 2021 5 | Mura | 4–2 | Radomlje | Murska Sobota |
| 17:00 CEST (UTC+2) | Lotrič 13'; Brkić (yellow card) 42'; Maroša 45+1'; Mulahusejnović 75'; Klepač 84' | Report | Šarić 1'; Jazbec (yellow card) 16'; Varga 34'; Mužek (yellow card) 49'; Guček (yellow card) 85' | Stadium: Fazanerija City Stadium; Referee: Alen Borošak; Assistant referees: Uroš Benc, Dejan Povšnar; Fourth official: Roman Glažar |

| 11 September 2021 8 | Mura | 1–0 | Olimpija Ljubljana | Murska Sobota |
| 20:15 CEST (UTC+2) | Karničnik 18'; Maruško (yellow card) 59'; Kozar (yellow card) 81' | Report | Crnomarković (yellow card) 30'; Kapun (yellow card) 52'; Elšnik (red card) 90+1' | Stadium: Fazanerija City Stadium; Referee: Slavko Vinčić; Assistant referees: Tomaž Klančnik, Grega Kordež; Fourth official: Dragoslav Perić |

| 19 September 2021 9 | Maribor | 1–2 | Mura | Maribor |
| 20:15 CEST (UTC+2) | Voloder 33', (yellow card) 80'; Mitrović (yellow card) 45' (yellow-red card) 47'; Sikošek (yellow card) 47' | Report | Šturm (yellow card) 10'; Kous 36'; Gorenc 88' | Stadium: Ljudski vrt Referee: Rade Obrenović; Assistant referees: Grega Kordež, Jure Praprotnik; Fourth official: Dragoslav Perić |

| 23 September 2021 10 | Tabor Sežana | 1–1 | Mura | Sežana |
| 15:00 CEST (UTC+2) | Krivičić 4'; Bongongui (yellow card) 54'; Doukouré (yellow card) 68' | Report | Maroša 7'; Maruško (yellow card) 46'; Horvat (yellow card) 59' | Stadium: Rajko Štolfa Stadium; Referee: Dragoslav Perić; Assistant referees: David Gabrovec, Aleš Skok; Fourth official: David Šmajc |

| 26 September 2021 11 | Mura | 0–0 | Koper | Murska Sobota |
| 20:15 CEST (UTC+2) | Mulahusejnović (yellow card) 66'; Horvat (yellow card) 90+2' | Report | Bešir (yellow card) 22'; Žužek (yellow card) 66'; Osuji (yellow card) 74'; Bručić (yellow card) 78' | Stadium: Fazanerija City Stadium; Referee: Matej Jug; Assistant referees: Uroš Bensa, Tomaž Černe; Fourth official: Roman Glažar |

| 3 October 2021 12 | Bravo | 0–0 | Mura | Ljubljana |
| 15:00 CEST (UTC+2) | Trontelj (yellow card) 32'; Simon (yellow card) 54'; Kirm (yellow card) 81' | Report | Lorbek (yellow card) 47'; Cipot (yellow card) 77'; Maruško (yellow card) 83' | Stadium: Šiška Sports Park; Referee: Mihael Antič; Assistant referees: Miha Kalan, Manuel Vidali; Fourth official: Roberto Ponis |

| 16 October 2021 13 | Mura | 3–2 | Aluminij | Murska Sobota |
| 17:00 CEST (UTC+2) | Nkama 3' (o.g.); Kous (yellow card) 26'; Gorenc 73'; Ouro 83' | Report | Đerlek 28'; Kidrič 59', (yellow card) 74'; Prša (yellow card) 70'; Pečnik (yellow card) 90+1' | Stadium: Fazanerija City Stadium; Referee: Rade Obrenović; Assistant referees: Tomislav Pospeh, Jure Praprotnik; Fourth official: Nejc Kajtazović |

| 24 October 2021 14 | Radomlje | 2–2 | Mura | Domžale |
| 17:00 CEST (UTC+2) | Pogačar (yellow card) 19'; Božić 24', 60'; Mužek (yellow card) 74'; Cerar (yellow card) 90+2' | Report | Lotrič 74' (pen.); Maroša 87'; Mulahusejnović (yellow card) 90+1' | Stadium: Domžale Sports Park; Referee: Aleksandar Matković; Assistant referees: Aleksander Burjan, Tomislav Pospeh; Fourth official: Rade Obrenović |

| 31 October 2021 15 | Celje | 1–0 | Mura | Celje |
| 17:00 CET (UTC+1) | Svetlin 25', (yellow card) 64'; Marandici (yellow card) 53'; Zec (yellow card) 68'; Sokler (yellow card) 87' | Report | Cipot (yellow card) 4'; Šturm (yellow card) 63' | Stadium: Stadion Z'dežele; Referee: David Šmajc; Assistant referees: David Gabrovec, Miha Kalan; Fourth official: Roberto Ponis |

| 7 November 2021 16 | Mura | 1–1 | Domžale | Murska Sobota |
| 20:15 CET (UTC+1) | Maroša 27'; Ouro (yellow card) 68'; Karamarko (yellow card) 75' | Report | Žinič 41'; Georgijević (yellow card) 47'; Jurilj (yellow card) 63'; Klemenčič (yellow card) 70' | Stadium: Fazanerija City Stadium; Referee: Matej Jug; Assistant referees: Dejan Povšnar, Alen Salkić; Fourth official: Aleksandar Matković |

| 28 November 2021 18 | Mura | 3–1 | Maribor | Murska Sobota |
| 20:15 CET (UTC+1) | Karničnik 25'; Horvat 30'; Šturm (yellow card) 48'; Lorbek (yellow card) 54'; Maroša 89' | Report | Repas (yellow card) 24'; Sirk (yellow card) 32'; Voloder 32'; Kronaveter (yellow card) 88' | Stadium: Fazanerija City Stadium; Referee: David Šmajc; Assistant referees: Davor Brezar, Jure Praprotnik; Fourth official: Asmir Sagrković |

| 4 December 2021 19 | Mura | 1–0 | Tabor Sežana | Murska Sobota |
| 17:00 CET (UTC+1) | Karamarko (yellow card) 39'; Gorenc (yellow card) 52'; Mulahusejnović 59' | Report | Ovsenek (yellow card) 37'; Guerrico (yellow card) 44'; Mavretič (yellow card) 76' | Stadium: Fazanerija City Stadium; Referee: Dejan Balažič; Assistant referees: Primož Perger, Žiga Šumer; Fourth official: Alen Borošak |

| 12 December 2021 20 | Koper | 2–2 | Mura | Koper |
| 17:00 CET (UTC+1) | Colley (yellow card) 44', (goal) 58'; Žužek 90+5' | Report | Gorenc (yellow card) 51'; Kous (yellow card) 64'; Mulahusejnović 81', (yellow card) 83'; Bobičanec 84' | Stadium: Bonifika Stadium; Referee: Nejc Kajtazović; Assistant referees: David Gabrovec, Aleksandar Kasapović; Fourth official: David Šmajc |

| 9 February 2022 17 | Olimpija Ljubljana | 1–0 | Mura | Ljubljana |
| 17:30 CET (UTC+1) | Mulahusejnović 8' (o.g.); Nukić (yellow card) 71' | Report | | Stadium: Stožice Stadium; Referee: Slavko Vinčić; Assistant referees: Uroš Benc, Tadej Friš; Fourth official: Darjan Kovačič |

| 13 February 2022 21 | Mura | 2–2 | Bravo | Murska Sobota |
| 15:00 CET (UTC+1) | Lorbek (yellow card) 6'; Kous 31', (red card) 63'; Ouro (yellow card) 75'; Gorenc (yellow card) 76'; Šturm 79'; Horvat (yellow card) 90' | Report | Kurtović (yellow card) 37'; Kerin 80'; Kurež 90+2' | Stadium: Fazanerija City Stadium; Referee: Aleksandar Matković; Assistant referees: Primož Perger, Žiga Šumer; Fourth official: Martin Matoša |

| 19 February 2022 22 | Aluminij | 0–1 | Mura | Kidričevo |
| 17:30 CET (UTC+1) | Azemović (yellow card) 42'; Nkama (yellow card) 43' | Report | Bobičanec 10' (pen.); Gorenc (yellow card) 49'; Kozar (yellow card) 90+2'; Šturm (yellow card) 90+3' | Stadium: Aluminij Sports Park; Referee: Matej Jug; Assistant referees: Tomaž Klančnik, Andraž Kovačič; Fourth official: Aleksandar Matković |

| 27 February 2022 23 | Mura | 0–2 | Radomlje | Murska Sobota |
| 15:00 CET (UTC+1) | Bobičanec (yellow card) 38'; Lorbek (yellow card) 75' | Report | Mrkonjić 31'; Šarić 57'; Guzina (yellow card) 87'; Mišić (yellow card) 90+4' | Stadium: Fazanerija City Stadium; Referee: Martin Matoša; Assistant referees: Aleksandar Kasapović, Matej Vojska; Fourth official: Nejc Kajtazović |

| 2 March 2022 24 | Mura | 3–2 | Celje | Murska Sobota |
| 17:30 CET (UTC+1) | Šturm (yellow card) 2'; Bobičanec 10', (yellow card) 31'; Horvat 15', 81' | Report | Zec (yellow card) 9'; Morozov 34'; Janjičić 38'; Svetlin (yellow card) 55'; Stojinović (yellow card) 70' | Stadium: Fazanerija City Stadium; Referee: Alen Borošak; Assistant referees: Uroš Benc, Denis Horvat; Fourth official: Aleksandar Matković |

| 5 March 2022 25 | Domžale | 1–1 | Mura | Domžale |
| 17:30 CET (UTC+1) | Martinović 31'; Ilenič (yellow card) 52' | Report | Gorenc 29', (yellow card) 52'; Šturm (yellow card) 48'; Kozar (yellow card) 56' | Stadium: Domžale Sports Park; Referee: Rade Obrenović; Assistant referees: Aleksandar Kasapović, Grega Kordež; Fourth official: Mihael Antič |

| 10 March 2022 26 | Mura | 3–2 | Olimpija Ljubljana | Murska Sobota |
| 17:30 CET (UTC+1) | Daku 8'; Balažic (yellow card) 23'; Boakye 25' (o.g.); Bobičanec 46'; Lorbek (yellow card) 58'; Gorenc (yellow card) 89'; Ljubić (yellow card) 90+4' | Report | Kvesić 11' (pen.); Crnomarković 38' | Stadium: Fazanerija City Stadium; Referee: David Šmajc; Assistant referees: David Gabrovec, Matej Žunič; Fourth official: Aleksandar Matković |

| 13 March 2022 27 | Maribor | 1–1 | Mura | Maribor |
| 17:30 CET (UTC+1) | Mitrović (yellow card) 45+4'; Repas (yellow card) 62'; Kronaveter 81' | Report | Mulahusejnović (yellow card) 45+4'; Horvat 45+7' (pen.); Gorenc (yellow card) 72' | Stadium: Ljudski vrt Referee: Roberto Ponis; Assistant referees: Davor Brezar, Miha Kalan; Fourth official: Dejan Balažič |

| 19 March 2022 28 | Tabor Sežana | 0–2 | Mura | Sežana |
| 15:00 CET (UTC+1) | Iscaye (yellow card) 7' | Report | Bobičanec (yellow card) 39', (goal) 51'; Pucko (yellow card) 44'; Horvat 65' | Stadium: Rajko Štolfa Stadium; Referee: Nejc Kajtazović; Assistant referees: David Gabrovec, Matic Mežnar; Fourth official: Rade Obrenović |

| 3 April 2022 29 | Mura | 1–2 | Koper | Murska Sobota |
| 17:30 CEST (UTC+2) | Gorenc (yellow card) 31'; Šturm (yellow card) 40'; Lorbek (yellow card) 63'; Škoflek 90+1'; Bobičanec (yellow card) 90+4' | Report | Colley (yellow card) 69', (goal) 73'; Novoselec 69'; Žužek (yellow card) 71' | Stadium: Fazanerija City Stadium; Referee: Matej Jug; Assistant referees: Tomaž Černe, Tadej Jug; Fourth official: Denis Halilović |

| 9 April 2022 30 | Bravo | 1–2 | Mura | Ljubljana |
| 15:00 CEST (UTC+2) | Bajde 36' | Report | Daku 25'; Gorenc (yellow card) 54'; Klepač 68' | Stadium: Šiška Sports Park; Referee: Slavko Vinčić; Assistant referees: Primož Perger, Žiga Šumer; Fourth official: Alen Bubek |

| 18 April 2022 31 | Mura | 3–0 | Aluminij | Murska Sobota |
| 17:30 CEST (UTC+2) | Cipot 6'; Šturm (yellow card) 61'; Bobičanec 82'; Klepač 90+4' | Report | Brest (yellow card) 35' | Stadium: Fazanerija City Stadium; Referee: Rade Obrenović; Assistant referees: Grega Kordež, Jure Praprotnik; Fourth official: Božo Kondić |

| 23 April 2022 32 | Radomlje | 3–2 | Mura | Domžale |
| 20:15 CEST (UTC+2) | Šarić 18'; Nuhanović 32'; Primc (yellow card) 37'; Mrkonjić 85' | Report | Daku 49'; Cipot 90+4' | Stadium: Domžale Sports Park; Referee: Martin Matoša; Assistant referees: Goran Mikača, Matej Žunič; Fourth official: Alen Borošak |

| 29 April 2022 33 | Celje | 1–3 | Mura | Celje |
| 20:15 CEST (UTC+2) | Šporn 8'; Zec (red card) 40'; Zaletel (yellow card) 82'; Sokler (yellow card) 86'; Flis (yellow card) 90+2' | Report | Gorenc (yellow card) 43'; Balažic (yellow card) 47'; Daku 54'; Bobičanec 74'; Horvat 90+6' (pen.) | Stadium: Stadion Z'dežele; Referee: Aleksandar Matković; Assistant referees: Žiga Šumer, Dejan Švarc; Fourth official: Denis Šabanagić |

| 8 May 2022 34 | Mura | 3–1 | Domžale | Murska Sobota |
| 17:30 CEST (UTC+2) | Horvat 28'; Kous (yellow card) 63'; Klepač 68'; Šturm (yellow card) 88'; Beganović 90+3' | Report | Podlogar 65', (yellow card) 73'; Martinović (yellow card) 76' | Stadium: Fazanerija City Stadium; Referee: Slavko Vinčić; Assistant referees: Tomaž Klančnik, Andraž Kovačič; Fourth official: Denis Halilović |

| 15 May 2022 35 | Olimpija Ljubljana | 3–3 | Mura | Ljubljana |
| 17:30 CEST (UTC+2) | Nukić 36'; Boakye 47'; Čabraja (yellow card) 69'; Prtajin 88' | Report | Klepač 6', (yellow card) 69'; Daku (yellow card) 9', (goal) 61'; Cipot (yellow card) 52'; Horvat 59', (yellow card) 74'; Kous (yellow card) 71'; Pucko (yellow card) 76' | Stadium: Stožice Stadium; Referee: Nejc Kajtazović; Assistant referees: David Gabrovec, Manuel Vidali; Fourth official: David Šmajc |

| 22 May 2022 36 | Mura | 1–3 | Maribor | Murska Sobota |
| 17:30 CEST (UTC+2) | Mitrović 65' (o.g.); Daku (yellow card) 69'; Balažic (yellow card) 74' | Report | Kronaveter 42'; Milec 46'; Mudrinski 53'; Watson (yellow card) 69' | Stadium: Fazanerija City Stadium; Referee: Rade Obrenović; Assistant referees: Grega Kordež, Jure Praprotnik; Fourth official: Aleksandar Matković |

=== Slovenian Football Cup ===
| 27 October 2021 Quarter-finals | Mura | 1–1 (a.e.t.) (2–3 p) | Bravo | Murska Sobota |
| 17:00 CEST (UTC+2) | Kozar 42'; Karničnik (yellow card) 79'; K. Cipot (yellow card) 97'; Obradović (yellow card) 99' | Report | Kramarič 26'; Memić (yellow card) 41'; Španring (yellow card) 68'; Josipović (yellow card) 97'; Jakšić (yellow card) 117' | Stadium: Fazanerija City Stadium; Referee: Alen Borošak; Assistant referees: Tadej Friš, Denis Horvat; Fourth official: Aleksandar Matković |
Note: Bravo won 3–2 on penalties.

=== UEFA Champions League ===
==== Qualifying rounds ====
===== First qualifying round =====
| 6 July 2021 First leg | Shkëndija (North Macedonia) | 0–1 | (Slovenia) Mura | Skopje, North Macedonia (Note: Shkëndija played their home match at Toše Proeski Arena, Skopje, instead of their regular stadium Ecolog Arena, Tetovo, which did not meet UEFA requirements.) |
| 20:00 CEST (UTC+2) | Krivák (yellow card) 28'; Ibraimi (penalty missed) 45+2'; Pavić (yellow card) 55'; Igor (yellow card) 66' | Report | Bobičanec 28' (pen.); Kouter (yellow card) 52' | Stadium: Toše Proeski Arena; Attendance: 3,200; Referee: António Nobre (Portugal); Assistant referees: Pedro Almeida (Portugal), Pedro Ribeiro (Portugal); Fourth official: Miguel Nogueira (Portugal) |

| 13 July 2021 Second leg | Mura (Slovenia) | 5–0 (6–0 agg.) | (North Macedonia) Shkëndija | Murska Sobota, Slovenia |
| 20:00 CEST (UTC+2) | Bobičanec 25'; Kouter 45+1'; Klepač 55', 87'; Kous 64'; Kozar (yellow card) 85' | Report | Krivák (yellow card) 42' (yellow-red card) 42' | Stadium: Fazanerija City Stadium; Attendance: 3,100; Referee: Marcel Birsan (Romania); Assistant referees: Valentin Avram (Romania), Mihai Marica (Romania); Fourth official: Iulian Dima (Romania) |
Note: Mura won 6–0 on aggregate.

===== Second qualifying round =====
| 21 July 2021 First leg | Mura (Slovenia) | 0–0 | (Bulgaria) Ludogorets Razgrad | Murska Sobota, Slovenia |
| 20:00 CEST (UTC+2) | Karničnik (yellow card) 9' | Report | Plastun (yellow card) 54' | Stadium: Fazanerija City Stadium; Attendance: 3,450; Referee: Harm Osmers (Germany); Assistant referees: Robert Kempter (Germany), Dominik Schaal (Germany); Fourth official: Thorben Siewer (Germany) |

| 28 July 2021 Second leg | Ludogorets Razgrad (Bulgaria) | 3–1 (3–1 agg.) | (Slovenia) Mura | Razgrad, Bulgaria |
| 21:00 EEST (UTC+3) | Sotiriou 4'; Tekpetey (yellow card) 35'; Despodov (yellow card) 50'; Manu 82'; Cauly 90', (yellow card) 90+1' | Report | Horvat 64' | Stadium: Huvepharma Arena; Attendance: 5,008; Referee: Marco Di Bello (Italy); Assistant referees: Alberto Tegoni (Italy), Mauro Vivenzi (Italy); Fourth official: Daniele Chiffi (Italy) |
Note: Ludogorets Razgrad won 3–1 on aggregate.

=== UEFA Europa League ===
==== Third qualifying round ====
| 5 August 2021 First leg | Mura (Slovenia) | 0–0 | (Lithuania) Žalgiris | Murska Sobota, Slovenia |
| 20:00 CEST (UTC+2) | Šturm (yellow card) 75' | Report | Bopesu (yellow card) 56'; Ljubisavljević (yellow card) 56'; Jarusevičius (yellow card) 90+3' | Stadium: Fazanerija City Stadium; Attendance: 2,500; Referee: Andreas Ekberg (Sweden); Assistant referees: Mehmet Culum (Sweden), Stefan Hallberg (Sweden); Fourth official: Kaspar Sjöberg (Sweden) |

| 12 August 2021 Second leg | Žalgiris (Lithuania) | 0–1 (0–1 agg.) | (Slovenia) Mura | Vilnius, Lithuania |
| 20:00 EEST (UTC+3) | Mikoliūnas (yellow card) 16'; Diaw (yellow card) 26'; Uzėla (yellow card) 44'; Ljubisavljević (yellow card) 72' | Report | Kous 12'; Horvat (yellow card) 23'; Kozar (yellow card) 50'; Gorenc (yellow card) 74'; Lorbek (yellow card) 89' | Stadium: LFF Stadium; Attendance: 2,921; Referee: Bartosz Frankowski (Poland); Assistant referees: Marcin Boniek (Poland), Jakub Winkler (Poland); Fourth official: Krzysztof Jakubik (Poland) |
Note: Mura won 1–0 on aggregate.

==== Play-off round ====
| 19 August 2021 First leg | Mura (Slovenia) | 1–3 | (Austria) Sturm Graz | Murska Sobota, Slovenia |
| 20:00 CEST (UTC+2) | Škoflek 3'; Šturm (yellow card) 23' | Report | Jantscher 18' (pen.); Gorenc Stanković (yellow card) 34'; Kiteishvili 60'; Yeboah 63' | Stadium: Fazanerija City Stadium; Attendance: 4,000; Referee: Michael Oliver (England); Assistant referees: Simon Bennett (England), Stuart Burt (England); Fourth official: Peter Bankes (England) |

| 26 August 2021 Second leg | Sturm Graz (Austria) | 2–0 (5–1 agg.) | (Slovenia) Mura | Graz, Austria |
| 21:00 CEST (UTC+2) | Kiteishvili 39'; Jantscher 66' | Report | Maruško (yellow card) 33' (yellow-red card) 54'; Gorenc (yellow card) 82' | Stadium: Liebenauer Stadium; Attendance: 8,237; Referee: José María Sánchez (Spain); Assistant referees: Raúl Cabañero (Spain), Iñigo Prieto (Spain); Fourth official: José Luis Munuera Montero (Spain) |
Note: Sturm Graz won 5–1 on aggregate.

=== UEFA Europa Conference League ===
==== Group stage ====
| Pos | Team | Pld | W | D | L | GF | GA | GD | Pts | Qualification | REN | VIT | TOT | MUR |
|---|---|---|---|---|---|---|---|---|---|---|---|---|---|---|
| 1 | (France) Rennes | 6 | 4 | 2 | 0 | 13 | 7 | +6 | 14 | Advance to round of 16 | — | 3–3 | 2–2 | 1–0 |
| 2 | (Netherlands) Vitesse | 6 | 3 | 1 | 2 | 12 | 9 | +3 | 10 | Advance to knockout round play-offs | 1–2 | — | 1–0 | 3–1 |
| 3 | (England) Tottenham Hotspur | 6 | 2 | 1 | 3 | 11 | 11 | 0 | 7 | | 0–3 (Note: The Tottenham Hotspur v Rennes match was awarded as a 3–0 win to Rennes due to numerous positive COVID-19 tests in the Tottenham Hotspur squad.) | 3–2 | — | 5–1 |
| 4 | (Slovenia) Mura | 6 | 1 | 0 | 5 | 5 | 14 | −9 | 3 | | 1–2 | 0–2 | 2–1 | — |

Source: UEFA
Rules for classification: Group stage tiebreakers
Notes:

| 16 September 2021 1 | Mura (Slovenia) | 0–2 | (Netherlands) Vitesse | Maribor, Slovenia (Note: Mura played their home matches at Ljudski vrt, Maribor, instead of their regular stadium Fazanerija City Stadium, Murska Sobota, which did not meet UEFA requirements.) |
| 18:45 CEST (UTC+2) | Horvat (yellow card) 72' | Report | Tronstad 30'; Doekhi 69' | Stadium: Ljudski vrt Attendance: 3,300; Referee: Mohammed Al-Hakim (Sweden); Assistant referees: Fredrik Klyver (Sweden), Niklas Nyberg (Sweden); Fourth official: Adam Ladebäck (Sweden) |

| 30 September 2021 2 | Tottenham Hotspur (England) | 5–1 | (Slovenia) Mura | London, England |
| 20:00 BST (UTC+1) | Alli 4' (pen.); Lo Celso 8'; Skipp (yellow card) 61'; Kane 68', 76', 87' | Report | Obradović (yellow card) 3'; Kous 53'; Maroša (yellow card) 74' | Stadium: Tottenham Hotspur Stadium; Attendance: 25,121; Referee: Yigal Frid (Israel); Assistant referees: Omer Barbiro (Israel), Matityahu Yacobov (Israel); Fourth official: Daniel Bar Natan (Israel) |

| 21 October 2021 3 | Mura (Slovenia) | 1–2 | (France) Rennes | Maribor, Slovenia |
| 18:45 CEST (UTC+2) | Lotrič 20'; Maruško (yellow card) 90+4' | Report | Guirassy 17' (pen.); Laborde 41'; Tchaouna (yellow card) 88' | Stadium: Ljudski vrt Attendance: 3,500; Referee: Volen Chinkov (Bulgaria); Assistant referees: Deniz Sokolov, Georgi Todorov; Fourth official: Nikola Popov |

| 4 November 2021 4 | Rennes (France) | 1–0 | (Slovenia) Mura | Rennes, France |
| 21:00 CET (UTC+1) | Badé 76'; Tchaouna (yellow card) 90+3'; Laborde (yellow card) 90+4' | Report | | Stadium: Roazhon Park; Attendance: 23,115; Referee: Juri Frischer (Estonia); Assistant referees: Veiko Mõtsnik, Sander Saga; Fourth official: Roomer Tarajev |

| 25 November 2021 5 | Mura (Slovenia) | 2–1 | (England) Tottenham Hotspur | Maribor, Slovenia |
| 18:45 CET (UTC+1) | Horvat 11'; Gorenc (yellow card) 22'; Mulahusejnović (yellow card) 27'; Kozar (yellow card) 35'; Karamarko (yellow card) 53'; Šturm (yellow card) 65'; Lorbek (yellow card) 83'; Maroša (yellow card) 89', (goal) 90+4' | Report | Sessegnon (yellow card) 15' (yellow-red card) 32'; Alli (yellow card) 53'; Kane 72' | Stadium: Ljudski vrt Attendance: 6,100; Referee: Antonio Emanuel Carvalho Nobre (Portugal); Assistant referees: Nelson Pereira (Portugal), Pedro Ribeiro (Portugal); Fourth official: Fábio Oliveira Melo (Portugal) |

| 9 December 2021 6 | Vitesse (Netherlands) | 3–1 | (Slovenia) Mura | Arnhem, Netherlands |
| 21:00 CET (UTC+1) | Buitink 4'; Openda 35'; Huisman 40'; Doekhi (yellow card) 77'; Bero (yellow card) 83' | Report | Kous (yellow card) 46'; Kozar (yellow card) 54'; K. Cipot (yellow card) 76'; Maroša 82'; Karničnik (yellow card) 90+4' | Stadium: GelreDome; Attendance: 0 Referee: Filip Glova (Slovakia); Assistant referees: Peter Bednár (Slovakia), Daniel Poláček (Slovakia); Fourth official: Michal Očenáš (Slovakia) |
