= List of Slovenian football transfers winter 2022–23 =

This is a list of Slovenian football transfers for the 2022–23 winter transfer window. Only transfers featuring Slovenian PrvaLiga are listed.

== Slovenian PrvaLiga ==
Note: Flags indicate national team as has been defined under FIFA eligibility rules. Players may hold more than one non-FIFA nationality.

=== Maribor ===
In:

No.	Pos.	Nation	Player
14	FW	CZE	Denis Alijagić (from (Greece) Olympiacos B)
17	FW	AUT	Arnel Jakupović (from Domžale)

Out:

No.	Pos.	Nation	Player
11	FW	SVN	Danijel Šturm (on loan to Aluminij)
14	MF	SRB	Vladan Vidaković (on loan to (Georgia (country)) Dinamo Batumi)
18	FW	CRO	Roko Baturina (loan return to (Hungary) Ferencváros)
42	DF	SVN	Vid Koderman (to Koper)

=== Koper ===
In:

No.	Pos.	Nation	Player
9	FW	FRA	Timothé Nkada (from (France) Reims)
14	MF	ENG	Matthias Fanimo (from (Croatia) Slaven Belupo)
17	MF	SWE	William Milovanovic (from (Sweden) Häcken, previously on loan at (Sweden) Utsikten)
42	DF	SVN	Vid Koderman (from Maribor)
68	DF	CRO	Karlo Bilić (free agent)
77	MF	KEN	Wilkims Ochieng (free agent)

Out:

No.	Pos.	Nation	Player
9	FW	SVN	Dario Kolobarić (to Gorica)
17	FW	BIH	Danilo Šipovac (loan return to (Bosnia and Herzegovina) Zrinjski Mostar)
20	MF	SVN	Luka Šušnjara (to Tabor Sežana)
24	DF	SVN	Žiga Laci (loan return to (Greece) AEK Athens)
26	DF	SVN	Aleksander Rajčević (to (Italy) Kras Repen)
80	MF	JAM	Cristojaye Daley (loan return to (Jamaica) Harbour View)
—	MF	SVN	Žan Bešir (on loan to Tabor Sežana, previously on loan at Gorica)

=== Olimpija Ljubljana ===
In:

No.	Pos.	Nation	Player
17	FW	BIH	Admir Bristrić (from (Croatia) Rijeka)
21	MF	CRO	Ivan Posavec (from (Croatia) Varaždin)
23	MF	BIH	Anes Krdžalić (on loan from (Croatia) Kustošija)

Out:

No.	Pos.	Nation	Player
11	MF	POR	Samuel Pedro (to (Norway) Jerv)
20	DF	CRO	Ivan Lagundžić (to (Bosnia and Herzegovina) Borac Banja Luka)
77	FW	BIH	Almedin Ziljkić (to (Bosnia and Herzegovina) Sarajevo)

=== Mura ===
In:

No.	Pos.	Nation	Player
10	FW	CRO	Ivan Šarić (from (Croatia) Hajduk Split)
13	GK	SVN	Florijan Raduha (from Celje)
16	MF	ITA	Filippo Tripi (from (Italy) Roma)
18	MF	SRB	Lazar Zličić (from (Kazakhstan) Aksu)
22	MF	MNE	Nikola Jovićević (from Domžale)
—	FW	JAM	Warner Brown (from (Jamaica) Tivoli Gardens)
—	FW	MNE	Ognjen Stijepović (from (Italy) Spezia, previously on loan at (Italy) Imolese)

Out:

No.	Pos.	Nation	Player
7	MF	SVN	Alen Kozar (to (Singapore) Balestier Khalsa)
8	MF	CRO	Luka Bobičanec (to Celje)
14	MF	SVN	Nik Lorbek (free agent)
17	FW	SVN	Josip Majić (on loan to Krka)
21	DF	SVN	Miha Kompan Breznik (on loan to Tabor Sežana)
24	MF	SVN	Tio Cipot (to (Italy) Spezia)
27	FW	SRB	Mihajlo Baić (loan return to (Croatia) Osijek II)
—	FW	JAM	Warner Brown (on loan to Beltinci)
—	DF	SVN	Vito Štrakl (on loan to Beltinci, previously on loan at Ljutomer)
—	FW	SVN	Jovan Koprivica (to (Austria) Draßburg, previously on loan at Svoboda Ljubljana)

=== Bravo ===
In:

No.	Pos.	Nation	Player
17	MF	CRO	Denis Bušnja (on loan from (Croatia) Rijeka)
49	DF	CRO	Maro Katinić (on loan from (Croatia) Dinamo Zagreb)
52	GK	NGA	Matthew Cyprian (free agent)

Out:

No.	Pos.	Nation	Player
4	DF	MNE	Stefan Milić (loan return to (Croatia) Dinamo Zagreb)
6	DF	SVN	Mitja Križan (to (Russia) Rodina Moscow)
7	FW	CRO	Loren Maružin (to (Bulgaria) Hebar Pazardzhik)
15	DF	SVN	Matija Burin (to Dekani)
35	MF	CRO	Ivan Šaranić (loan return to (Croatia) Dinamo Zagreb)

=== Radomlje ===
In:

No.	Pos.	Nation	Player
9	FW	SEN	Pape Samba Thiam (on loan from (Italy) Benevento)
27	DF	SVN	Gaber Dobrovoljc (from (Iceland) KA)
33	MF	BIH	Ognjen Gnjatić (free agent)
55	DF	SVN	Janko Ivetić (from Triglav Kranj)

Out:

No.	Pos.	Nation	Player
9	FW	BIH	Nedim Hadžić (to (Bosnia and Herzegovina) Velež Mostar)
17	MF	SVN	Klemen Justin (to Dob)
19	FW	BIH	Ismir Nadarević (on loan to Šenčur)
29	DF	SVN	Luka Guček (to (Ukraine) Chornomorets Odesa)

=== Domžale ===
In:

No.	Pos.	Nation	Player
3	DF	SRB	Andrej Đurić (from (Serbia) Red Star Belgrade, previously on loan)
14	FW	BIH	Mirza Hasanbegović (free agent)
45	DF	SVN	Amadej Brecl (from Celje)
71	DF	SUI	Elmedin Fazlić (from (Switzerland) Basel youth)

Out:

No.	Pos.	Nation	Player
5	DF	SVN	Janez Pišek (to (Bosnia and Herzegovina) Borac Banja Luka)
14	FW	CRO	Ivan Durdov (to (Belgium) KV Oostende)
15	DF	SVN	Domen Zajšek (on loan to Bistrica)
16	MF	MNE	Nikola Jovićević (to Mura)
24	DF	DOM	Christian Schoissengeyr (free agent)
29	FW	AUT	Arnel Jakupović (to Maribor)
30	DF	BIH	Enes Alić (to (Hungary) Kisvárda)
35	DF	SVN	Mitja Ilenič (to (United States) New York City)
—	FW	JAM	Ranaldo Biggs (on loan to Rudar Velenje, previously on loan at Gorica)

=== Celje ===
In:

No.	Pos.	Nation	Player
23	DF	SVN	Žan Karničnik (on loan from (Bulgaria) Ludogorets)
24	DF	CRO	Daniel Štefulj (on loan from (Bulgaria) Dinamo Zagreb)
44	MF	CRO	Luka Bobičanec (from Mura)
69	GK	CRO	Matko Obradović (free agent)
81	DF	SVN	Klemen Nemanič (from (Romania) Csíkszereda)
99	FW	BEL	Ibrahim Kargbo Jr. (from (Ukraine) Dynamo Kyiv, previously on loan at (Cyprus) Doxa Katokopias)

Out:

No.	Pos.	Nation	Player
5	DF	SVN	Dušan Stojinović (to (Poland) Jagiellonia Białystok)
9	FW	CRO	Ivan Božić (free agent)
15	DF	SVN	Amadej Brecl (to Domžale)
24	DF	RUS	Grigori Morozov (on loan to (Israel) Beitar Jerusalem)
31	GK	SVN	Florijan Raduha (to Mura)
47	FW	CIV	Néné Gbamblé (to (Russia) Akhmat Grozny)
90	MF	BIH	Tomislav Tomić (to (Bosnia and Herzegovina) Široki Brijeg)
—	MF	SVN	Anej Kujović (on loan to Rudar Velenje, previously on loan at Bistrica)
—	FW	SVN	Stian Džumhur (on loan to Rudar Velenje, previously on loan at Bistrica)
—	FW	SVN	Tai Mateo Panić (to Dekani, previously on loan at Bistrica)

=== Tabor Sežana ===
In:

No.	Pos.	Nation	Player
7	FW	NGA	Manji Gimsay (from (Croatia) Dubrava)
11	MF	SVN	Luka Šušnjara (from Koper)
18	MF	CRO	Sacha Marasović (from (Croatia) Šibenik)
21	DF	SVN	Miha Kompan Breznik (on loan from Mura)
27	MF	SVN	Žan Bešir (on loan from Koper, previously on loan at Gorica)
36	DF	LBR	Mark Pabai (free agent)
55	MF	CRO	Dino Halilović (from (Netherlands) Den Bosch)
—	MF	SVN	Mark Žagar (from Dekani)

Out:

No.	Pos.	Nation	Player
3	DF	KOS	Elvis Letaj (loan return to (Croatia) Hajduk Split)
7	FW	SVN	Tom Kljun (to (Italy) Lecce)
10	MF	IRQ	Abdullah Hameed (free agent)
11	FW	AUT	Miloš Savić (to (Austria) Kuchl)
22	MF	CRO	Diego Živulić (to (Romania) Oțelul Galați)
31	FW	SRB	Stevan Nikolić (to Krško)
61	MF	TUR	Oğuzhan Demirci (free agent)
63	FW	FRA	Boucif El Afghani (free agent)
90	DF	SVN	Milan Kocić (to (Italy) Clivense)
92	MF	ESP	Coba Gomes (to (Spain) Conquense)
99	MF	MNE	Milan Vukotić (loan return to (Croatia) Dinamo Zagreb)
—	GK	SVN	Arian Rener (on loan to Fužinar, previously on loan at Primorje)
—	FW	SVN	Robert Čakš (to Beltinci, previously on loan)

=== Gorica ===
In:

No.	Pos.	Nation	Player
3	DF	CRO	Filip Brekalo (on loan from (Croatia) Dinamo Zagreb, previously on loan at (Croatia) Varaždin)
10	MF	USA	Steven Juncaj (from (United States) Michigan Stars)
11	FW	ALB	Bernard Karrica (on loan from (Croatia) Rijeka)
15	DF	LUX	Vahid Selimović (free agent)
17	DF	SVN	Tilen Mlakar (from Ilirija 1911)
27	MF	MKD	Luka Stankovski (on loan from (Turkey) Gaziantep)
80	MF	BIH	Zvonimir Petrović (from (Poland) Korona Kielce, previously on loan)
90	FW	SVN	Dario Kolobarić (from Koper)

Out:

No.	Pos.	Nation	Player
3	DF	SVN	Jošt Urbančič (to (Norway) Viking)
17	MF	SVN	Žan Bešir (loan return to Koper)
27	DF	SVN	Denis Klinar (to Fužinar)
77	FW	JAM	Ranaldo Biggs (loan return to Domžale)

== See also ==
- 2022–23 Slovenian PrvaLiga
