= 2018–19 Slovenian Football Cup =

Tournament details
- Country: Slovenia
- Teams: 28

Final positions
- Champions: Olimpija Ljubljana (2nd title)
- Runners-up: Maribor

Tournament statistics
- Matches played: 33
- Goals scored: 116 (3.52 per match)
- Top goal scorer(s): Jaka Štromajer; Stefan Savić (both five goals)

The 2018–19 Slovenian Football Cup was the 28th edition of the football knockout competition in Slovenia. The winners of the cup earned a place in the 2019–20 UEFA Europa League first qualifying round. The tournament began on 14 August 2018 and ended on 30 May 2019 with the final.

Olimpija Ljubljana were the defending champions after defeating Aluminij with a score of 6–1 in the previous season's final. They successfully defended the title by defeating their eternal rivals Maribor 2–1 in the final.

== Competition format ==
| Round | Draw date | Match date | Fixtures | Clubs | Format details |
|---|---|---|---|---|---|
| First round | 21 June 2018 | 14–16 August 2018 | 12 | 24 → 12 | 18 clubs that have qualified through MNZ Regional Cups + 6 clubs from the 2017–18 PrvaLiga that didn't qualify for UEFA competitions entered at this stage and were drawn into 12 pairs. Teams that have qualified from the same regional cup could not be drawn against each other. The twelve winners were decided over one leg, with extra time and penalties if scores were level. Lower-level teams were the hosts. If both teams from a pair were from the same level, the home team was determined by the draw. |
| Round of 16 | 20 August 2018 | 12–20 September 2018 | 8 | 12+4 → 8 | 12 first round winners were joined by four 2017–18 PrvaLiga teams that qualified for UEFA competitions, and were drawn into 8 pairs. Teams that have qualified from the same regional cup could not be drawn against each other. The eight winners were decided over one leg, with extra time and penalties if scores were level. Lower-level teams were the hosts. If both teams from a pair were from the same level, the home team was determined by the draw. |
| Quarter-finals | 21 September 2018 | 17–31 October 2018 | 4 | 8 → 4 | 8 teams were drawn into 4 pairs. The four winners were decided over two legs on home and away basis with away goals rule being used. In case of a tie, extra time and penalties were used. |
| Semi-finals | 20 December 2018 | 3–24 April 2019 | 2 | 4 → 2 | 4 teams were drawn into 2 pairs. The two winners were decided over two legs on home and away basis with away goals rule being used. In case of a tie, extra time and penalties were used. |
| Final | N/A | 30 May 2019 | 1 | 2 → 1 | Winner was decided in a single game, played at Stadion Z'dežele in Celje. Extra time and penalties would be used if the score would be level. The winners have qualified for the 2019–20 UEFA Europa League first qualifying round. |

== Qualified teams ==
=== 2017–18 Slovenian PrvaLiga members ===
- Aluminij
- Ankaran
- Celje
- Domžale
- Gorica
- Krško
- Maribor
- Olimpija
- Rudar Velenje
- Triglav Kranj

=== Qualified through MNZ Regional Cups ===
- 2017–18 MNZ Celje Cup: Šampion and Rogaška
- 2017–18 MNZ Koper Cup: Koper and Plama Podgrad
- 2017–18 MNZG-Kranj Cup: Jesenice and Zarica Kranj
- 2017–18 MNZ Lendava Cup: Turnišče and Nafta
- 2017–18 MNZ Ljubljana Cup: Ivančna Gorica and Bravo
- 2017–18 MNZ Maribor Cup: Akumulator Mežica and Korotan Prevalje
- 2017–18 MNZ Murska Sobota Cup: Grad and Mura
- 2017–18 MNZ Nova Gorica Cup: Bilje and Brda
- 2017–18 MNZ Ptuj Cup: Videm and Drava Ptuj

== Bracket ==
First round
Bilje | 0
Celje | 2
Turnišče | 0
Krško | 8
Korotan Prevalje | 5
Kranj | 1
Grad | 1
Aluminij | 2
Jesenice | 0
Koper | 12
Nafta 1903 | 2
Ankaran | 1
Videm | 1
Triglav Kranj (a.e.t.) | 2
Drava Ptuj | 0
Bravo | 2
Šampion | 0
Ivančna Gorica (a.e.t.) | 1
Akumulator Mežica | 1
Brda | 7
Plama Podgrad | 0
Gorica | 5
Rogaška | 1
Mura | 3

Round of 16
Celje | 0
Krško | 3
Korotan Prevalje | 0
Aluminij | 3
Koper | 2
Nafta 1903 | 0
Olimpija Ljubljana | 2
Triglav Kranj | 1
Bravo | 2
Maribor | 3
Ivančna Gorica | 0
Domžale | 3
Brda | 0
Gorica | 2
Mura | 1
Rudar Velenje | 0

Quarter-finals
Krško | 2 | 0 | 2
Aluminij (a.) | 2 | 0 | 2
Koper | 0 | 1 | 1
Olimpija Ljubljana | 5 | 1 | 6
Maribor | 1 | 2 | 3
Domžale | 0 | 2 | 2
Gorica | 0 | 2 | 2
Mura | 3 | 3 | 6

Semi-finals
Aluminij | 1 | 0 | 1
Olimpija Ljubljana | 2 | 4 | 6
Maribor | 1 | 1 | 2
Mura | 0 | 1 | 1

Final
Olimpija Ljubljana | 2
Maribor | 1

== First round ==
| 14 August 2018 | Turnišče | 0–8 | Krško | Turnišče |
| 16:00 CEST | | Report | Božić 3', 19', 65', 88'; Kuntarič 15' Vekić 16' (pen.); Koren 60' (o.g.); Kulinitš 90' | Stadium: Igrišče Turnišče; Attendance: 30; Referee: Alen Borošak |

| 15 August 2018 | Akumulator Mežica | 1–7 | Brda | Mežica |
| 16:00 CEST | Juraja 71' | Report | Perko 3'; Varga 19', 26', 75' (pen.); Bužinel 70'; Debenjak 81'; Kompara 87' | Stadium: Igrišče Mežica; Attendance: 120; Referee: Roman Glažar |

| 15 August 2018 | Grad | 1–2 | Aluminij | Grad |
| 16:00 CEST | Belna 38' | Report | Trdina 40'; Kidrič 70' | Stadium: Igrišče Pod gradom Attendance: 400; Referee: Bojan Tkalčič |

| 15 August 2018 | Drava Ptuj | 0–2 | Bravo | Ptuj |
| 16:00 CEST | | Report | Nukić 6' (pen.); Piskule 79' | Stadium: Ptuj City Stadium; Attendance: 150; Referee: Miran Bukovec |

| 15 August 2018 | Videm | 1–2 (a.e.t.) | Triglav Kranj | Videm pri Ptuju |
| 16:00 CEST | Zemljarič 32' | Report | Afoakwa 21'; Hasanaj 110' | Stadium: Videm Sports Park; Attendance: 300; Referee: Vojko Goričan |

| 15 August 2018 | Jesenice | 0–12 | Koper | Jesenice |
| 16:00 CEST | | Report | Štromajer 13', 34', 58', 66', 73'; Baša 21', 64', 76' Fatić 28', 48'; Hadžić 51'; Ajkić 71' | Stadium: Podmežakla Stadium; Attendance: 200; Referee: Mitja Žganec |

| 15 August 2018 | Plama Podgrad | 0–5 | Gorica | Krvavi Potok |
| 16:00 CEST | | Report | Smajlagić 48', 51'; Bužinel 56'; Osuji 64', 93' | Stadium: Stadion NK Jadran; Attendance: 150; Referee: Blaž Kos |

| 15 August 2018 | Šampion | 0–1 (a.e.t.) | Ivančna Gorica | Celje |
| 16:00 CEST | | Report | Kastelic 104' | Stadium: Olimp; Attendance: 100; Referee: Aleksandar Matković |

| 15 August 2018 | Nafta 1903 | 2–1 | Ankaran | Lendava |
| 16:00 CEST | Vaš 61' (pen.); Grabant 80' | Report | Menegusso 50' | Stadium: Lendava Sports Park; Attendance: 300; Referee: Dejan Vivod |

| 15 August 2018 | Bilje | 0–2 | Celje | Bilje |
| 16:00 CEST | | Report | Lupeta 76'; Koritnik 90+1' | Stadium: Stadion V dolinci Attendance: 200; Referee: Mihael Antič |

| 15 August 2018 | Korotan Prevalje | 5–1 | Kranj | Prevalje |
| 18:00 CEST | Kűzma 13', 36'; Kovačić 43'; Petrej 53'; Zamernik 56' | Report | Eržen 23' | Stadium: Športni park Ugasle peči Attendance: 200; Referee: Bojan Mertik |

| 16 August 2018 | Rogaška | 1–3 | Mura | Rogaška Slatina |
| 16:00 CEST | Biruš 5' | Report | Bobičanec 16', 26'; Maroša 62' (pen.) | Stadium: Rogaška Slatina Sports Centre; Attendance: 250; Referee: Marko Lacković |

== Round of 16 ==
| 12 September 2018 | Mura | 1–0 | Rudar Velenje | Murska Sobota |
| 15:30 CEST | Bobičanec 84' | Report | | Stadium: Fazanerija City Stadium; Attendance: 900; Referee: Asmir Sagrković |

| 12 September 2018 | Bravo | 2–3 | Maribor | Ljubljana |
| 15:30 CEST | Nukić 30'; Jašaragič 38' | Report | Mešanović 32'; Felipe Santos 90'; Rajčević 90+5' | Stadium: Šiška Sports Park; Attendance: 900; Referee: Marko Podgoršek |

| 12 September 2018 | Koper | 2–0 | Nafta 1903 | Koper |
| 19:00 CEST | Vrdolija 68'; Novinič 80' (o.g.) | Report | | Stadium: Bonifika Stadium; Attendance: 300; Referee: Bojan Tkalčič |

| 12 September 2018 | Ivančna Gorica | 0–3 | Domžale | Ivančna Gorica |
| 19:30 CEST | | Report | Vuk 6'; Ibričić 37'; Belima 68' | Stadium: Ivančna Gorica Stadium; Attendance: 200; Referee: Miran Bukovec |

| 19 September 2018 | Brda | 0–2 | Gorica | Dobrovo |
| 15:30 CEST | | Report | Osuji 14'; Filipović 90+2' | Stadium: Vipolže Stadium; Attendance: 250; Referee: Mitja Žganec |

| 19 September 2018 | Korotan Prevalje | 0–3 | Aluminij | Prevalje |
| 18:00 CEST | | Report | Kidrič 54'; Kontek 55'; Leko 67' | Stadium: Športni park Ugasle peči Attendance: 400; Referee: Vojko Goričan |

| 19 September 2018 | Celje | 0–3 | Krško | Celje |
| 19:00 CEST | | Report | Vekić 8'; Volaš 13'; Da Silva 56' | Stadium: Stadion Z'dežele; Attendance: 250; Referee: Alen Borošak |

| 20 September 2018 | Olimpija Ljubljana | 2–1 | Triglav Kranj | Ljubljana |
| 18:00 CEST | Lendrić 14'; Črnic 89' | Report | Tijanić 83' | Stadium: Stožice Stadium; Attendance: 800; Referee: Roman Glažar |

== Quarter-finals ==
=== First leg ===
| 17 October 2018 | Koper | 0–5 | Olimpija Ljubljana | Koper |
| 20:00 CEST | | Report | Savić 8'; Boateng 13', 48'; Vombergar 45'; Kronaveter 84' | Stadium: Bonifika Stadium; Attendance: 3,100; Referee: Slavko Vinčić |

| 23 October 2018 | Maribor | 1–0 | Domžale | Maribor |
| 16:30 CEST | Mlakar 20' | Report | | Stadium: Ljudski vrt Attendance: 2,500; Referee: Roman Glažar |

| 24 October 2018 | Gorica | 0–3 | Mura | Nova Gorica |
| 16:30 CEST | | Report | Lorbek 12'; Maroša 85', 90+2' | Stadium: Nova Gorica Sports Park; Attendance: 350; Referee: David Šmajc |

| 24 October 2018 | Krško | 2–2 | Aluminij | Krško |
| 18:00 CEST | Vukušić 18'; Ejup 50' | Report | Trdina 60'; Maloku 79' | Stadium: Matija Gubec Stadium; Attendance: 200; Referee: Asmir Sagrković |

=== Second leg ===
| 31 October 2018 | Mura | 3–2 (6–2 agg.) | Gorica | Murska Sobota |
| 13:00 CET | Maroša 6'; Horvat 51'; Karničnik 65' | Report | Kavčič 17'; Smajlagić 82' | Stadium: Fazanerija City Stadium; Attendance: 1,300; Referee: Roman Glažar |

| 31 October 2018 | Domžale | 2–2 (2–3 agg.) | Maribor | Domžale |
| 17:00 CET | Čerin 36'; Ibričić 76' (pen.) | Report | Cretu 90+3'; Mešanović 90+4' | Stadium: Domžale Sports Park; Attendance: 1,600; Referee: Andrej Žnidaršič |

| 31 October 2018 | Aluminij | 0–0 (2a–2 agg.) | Krško | Kidričevo |
| 18:00 CET | | Report | | Stadium: Aluminij Sports Park; Attendance: 100; Referee: Dragoslav Perić |

| 31 October 2018 | Olimpija Ljubljana | 1–1 (6–1 agg.) | Koper | Ljubljana |
| 20:00 CET | Lendrić 60' | Report | Baša 48' | Stadium: Stožice Stadium; Attendance: 500; Referee: Darjan Kovačič |

== Semi-finals ==
=== First leg ===
| 3 April 2019 | Maribor | 1–0 | Mura | Maribor |
| 20:00 CEST | Hotić 85' | Report | | Stadium: Ljudski vrt Attendance: 3,500; Referee: Roman Glažar |

| 4 April 2019 | Aluminij | 1–2 | Olimpija Ljubljana | Kidričevo |
| 20:00 CEST | Lucas Horvat 49' | Report | Brkić 27', 39' | Stadium: Aluminij Sports Park; Attendance: 300; Referee: Matej Jug |

=== Second leg ===
| 23 April 2019 | Olimpija Ljubljana | 4–0 (6–1 agg.) | Aluminij | Ljubljana |
| 20:00 CEST | Kronaveter 10', 69' (pen.); Savić 19', 87' | Report | | Stadium: Stožice Stadium; Attendance: 600; Referee: Nejc Kajtazović |

| 24 April 2019 | Mura | 1–1 (1–2 agg.) | Maribor | Murska Sobota |
| 19:30 CEST | Boškovič 90+2' | Report | Vršič 49' | Stadium: Fazanerija City Stadium; Attendance: 5,000; Referee: Damir Skomina |

== Final ==
30 May 2019
20:15 CEST

| Olimpija Ljubljana | 2–1 | Maribor |
|---|---|---|
| Savić 17', 75' | Report | Tavares 90+2' |

Stadion Z'dežele, Celje
Attendance: 8,623
Referee: Matej Jug

== See also ==
- 2018–19 Slovenian PrvaLiga
