= Cipot =

Cipot is a surname. Notable people with the surname include:

- Fabijan Cipot (born 1976), Slovenian footballer, father of Kai and Tio
- Kai Cipot (born 2001), Slovenian footballer
- Tio Cipot (born 2003), Slovenian footballer
