= 2021–22 Slovenian Football Cup =

Tournament details
- Country: Slovenia
- Teams: 12

Final positions
- Champions: Koper (4th title)
- Runners-up: Bravo

Tournament statistics
- Matches played: 11
- Goals scored: 26 (2.36 per match)
- Top goal scorer: Five players (2 goals each)

The 2021–22 Slovenian Football Cup was the 31st edition of the football knockout competition in Slovenia. The tournament began on 15 September 2021 and ended on 11 May 2022 with the final. Due to the COVID-19 pandemic in Slovenia, the Intercommunal Regional Cup competitions were not held in the 2020–21 season; as a result, only all ten teams of the 2020–21 Slovenian PrvaLiga and the best two teams of the 2020–21 Slovenian Second League entered the competition. Olimpija Ljubljana were the defending champions after winning the previous season's final.

Koper won their fourth title after beating Bravo 3–1 in the final. As winners, they earned a place in the second qualifying round of the 2022–23 UEFA Europa Conference League.

== Qualified teams ==
=== 2020–21 Slovenian PrvaLiga members ===
- Aluminij
- Bravo
- Celje
- Domžale
- Gorica
- Koper
- Maribor
- Mura
- Olimpija
- Tabor Sežana

=== 2020–21 Slovenian Second League members ===
- Krka
- Radomlje

== First round ==
Four first round matches were played on 15 and 16 September 2021.

| 15 September 2021 | Tabor Sežana | 0–2 | Celje | Sežana |
| 15:00 UTC+2 | | Report | Sokler 44'; Begić 90' | Stadium: Rajko Štolfa Stadium; Attendance: 160; Referee: Martin Matoša |

| 15 September 2021 | Radomlje | 2–1 | Krka | Domžale |
| 18:00 UTC+2 | Kregar 22'; Božić 73' | Report | Pranjić 33' | Stadium: Domžale Sports Park; Attendance: 150; Referee: Denis Šabanagić |

| 16 September 2021 | Gorica | 0–2 | Bravo | Nova Gorica |
| 14:00 UTC+2 | | Report | Maružin 32'; Ogrinec 33' | Stadium: Nova Gorica Sports Park; Attendance: 100; Referee: Aleksandar Matković |

| 16 September 2021 | Aluminij | 1–2 | Koper | Kidričevo |
| 16:00 UTC+2 | Kadrić 8' | Report | Parris 30'; Palčič 38' | Stadium: Aluminij Sports Park; Attendance: 100; Referee: Bojan Mertik |

== Quarter-finals ==
The quarter-finals were played on 27 and 28 October 2021.

| 27 October 2021 | Radomlje | 0–0 (a.e.t.) (3–4 p) | Celje | Domžale |
| 15:00 UTC+2 | | Report | | Stadium: Domžale Sports Park; Attendance: 200; Referee: Denis Šabanagić |
| | Penalties |
| | Zabukovnik (penalty scored); M. Božić (penalty scored); Mužek (penalty scored); Guzina (penalty missed); Šarić (penalty missed) | | (penalty scored) Kuzmanović; (penalty scored) Begić; (penalty scored) Medved; (penalty missed) Benedičič; (penalty scored) I. Božić |

| 27 October 2021 | Mura | 1–1 (a.e.t.) (2–3 p) | Bravo | Murska Sobota |
| 17:00 UTC+2 | Kozar 42' | Report | Kramarič 26' | Stadium: Fazanerija City Stadium; Attendance: 1,000; Referee: Alen Borošak |
| | Penalties |
| | Ouro (penalty scored); Maruško (penalty missed); Pucko (penalty missed); Karničnik (penalty scored); Lotrič (penalty missed) | | (penalty scored) Ogrinec; (penalty scored) Jakšić; (penalty scored) Križan; (penalty missed) Drkušić |

| 27 October 2021 | Olimpija Ljubljana | 0–1 | Koper | Ljubljana |
| 20:15 UTC+2 | | Report | Parris 5' | Stadium: Stožice Stadium; Attendance: 1,500; Referee: Dragoslav Perić |

| 28 October 2021 | Maribor | 1–2 | Domžale | Maribor |
| 20:15 UTC+2 | Sellouki 90' | Report | Ibričić 33'; Georgijević 70' | Stadium: Ljudski vrt Attendance: 1,500; Referee: Mihael Antič |

== Semi-finals ==
The semi-finals were played on 20 and 21 April 2022.

| 20 April 2022 | Bravo | 3–2 | Domžale | Ljubljana |
| 16:00 UTC+2 | Marjanac 64'; Kramarič 85' (pen.); Bajde 90+4' | Report | Ibričić 3'; Klemenčič 26' | Stadium: Šiška Sports Park; Attendance: 1,200; Referee: Bojan Mertik |

| 21 April 2022 | Koper | 1–0 | Celje | Koper |
| 20:15 UTC+2 | Osuji 90+5' (pen.) | Report | | Stadium: Bonifika Stadium; Attendance: 1,100; Referee: Nejc Kajtazović |

== Final ==
The final was played on 11 May 2022.

11 May 2022
20:30 CEST

| Koper | 3–1 | Bravo |
|---|---|---|
| Colley 70', 84'; Kotnik 73' | Report | Bajde 83' |

Stadion Z'dežele, Celje
Attendance: 3,200
Referee: Slavko Vinčić

== See also ==
- 2021–22 Slovenian PrvaLiga
