= Jan Gorenc =

Slovenian footballer (born 1999)

Personal information
- Date of birth: 26 July 1999 (age 27)
- Place of birth: Brežice, Slovenia
- Height: 1.92 m (6 ft 4 in)
- Position: Defender

Team information
- Current team: Olimpija Ljubljana
- Number: 30

Youth career
- –2017: Krško

Senior career*
Years	Team	Apps	(Gls)
2016–2018	Krško	35	(1)
2018–2020	Olimpija Ljubljana	2	(0)
2020–2022	Mura	65	(7)
2022–2025	Eupen	25	(4)
2024	→ Bravo (loan)	15	(1)
2025–	Olimpija Ljubljana	0	(0)

International career
2017	Slovenia U18	10	(0)
2017	Slovenia U19	2	(0)
2020	Slovenia U21	2	(0)
- * Club domestic league appearances and goals as of 13 June 2025

Jan Gorenc (born 26 July 1999) is a Slovenian professional footballer who plays as a defender for Slovenian PrvaLiga club Olimpija Ljubljana.

== Club career ==
In the summer of 2022, Gorenc signed a two-year contract with Eupen in Belgium. On 24 January 2024, he was loaned to Bravo until the end of the season.

== Honours ==
Olimpija Ljubljana

- Slovenian Cup: 2018–19

Mura

- Slovenian PrvaLiga: 2020–21
- Slovenian Cup: 2019–20
