= Luka Šušnjara =

Slovenian footballer

Personal information
- Date of birth: 4 April 1997 (age 29)
- Place of birth: Ljubljana, Slovenia
- Height: 1.88 m (6 ft 2 in)
- Position: Winger

Team information
- Current team: Triglav Kranj

Youth career
- 2010–2014: Domžale
- 2014–2016: Atalanta

Senior career*
Years	Team	Apps	(Gls)
2016	Dob	6	(0)
2017	Kranj	9	(2)
2017–2018	Celje	12	(1)
2018–2020	Mura	77	(14)
2020–2021	Chambly Oise	11	(0)
2021	Wisła Płock	8	(1)
2022	Koper	21	(0)
2023	Tabor Sežana	15	(2)
2023	Šibenik	0	(0)
2023	Valletta	7	(0)
2024	Vardar	13	(2)
2024–	Triglav Kranj	0	(0)

International career
2013	Slovenia U16		
2013	Slovenia U17		
2014	Slovenia U18		
2015–2016	Slovenia U19		
2017–2018	Slovenia U21		
- * Club domestic league appearances and goals as of 3 July 2024

Luka Šušnjara (born 4 April 1997) is a Slovenian professional footballer who plays as a winger for Triglav Kranj.

== Club career ==
Šušnjara made his professional debut with Celje in a 4–0 loss to Domžale on 23 July 2017. In August 2020, Šušnjara moved to Chambly.

On 26 January 2021, Šušnjara signed with Wisła Płock. He left the club by mutual consent on 9 November 2021. In August 2023, he joined Maltese powerhouse Valletta.

== International career ==
Šušnjara was capped for all Slovenian youth selections from under-16 to under-21.

== Honours ==
Mura

- Slovenian Cup: 2019–20

Koper

- Slovenian Cup: 2021–22
