= Klemen Šturm =

Slovenian footballer (born 1994)

Personal information
- Date of birth: 27 June 1994 (age 32)
- Place of birth: Kranj, Slovenia
- Height: 1.68 m (5 ft 6 in)
- Position: Left-back

Youth career
- –2012: Triglav Kranj

Senior career*
Years	Team	Apps	(Gls)
2012–2016	Triglav Kranj	110	(0)
2016–2018	Krško	61	(1)
2018–2022	Mura	107	(3)
2022–2023	Hapoel Hadera	22	(0)
2023–2026	Velež Mostar	72	(2)

International career
2009	Slovenia U16	1	(1)
2010	Slovenia U17	7	(0)
2012	Slovenia U19	5	(0)
2019	Slovenia B	1	(0)
- * Club domestic league appearances and goals as of 11 June 2026

Klemen Šturm (born 27 June 1994) is a Slovenian professional footballer who plays as a left-back.

== Honours ==
Mura

- Slovenian PrvaLiga: 2020–21
- Slovenian Cup: 2019–20
