= Kai Cipot =

Slovenian footballer (born 2001)

Personal information
- Date of birth: 28 April 2001 (age 25)
- Place of birth: Murska Sobota, Slovenia
- Height: 1.87 m (6 ft 2 in)
- Position: Defender

Team information
- Current team: Veres Rivne
- Number: 4

Youth career
- 2008–2013: Mura 05
- 2013–2020: Mura

Senior career*
Years	Team	Apps	(Gls)
2019–2025	Mura	137	(11)
2025–	Veres Rivne	29	(2)

International career
2019	Slovenia U18	3	(1)
2019–2020	Slovenia U19	14	(7)
2021	Slovenia U21	6	(0)
- * Club domestic league appearances and goals as of 3 June 2026

Kai Cipot (born 28 April 2001) is a Slovenian footballer who plays as a defender for Ukrainian Premier League club Veres Rivne. Initially a forward, he switched to his current position in 2022. Cipot was capped for Slovenia at under-18, under-19 and under-21 levels.

== Career ==
=== Mura ===
A graduate of Mura's youth academy, Cipot made his competitive debut for the club on 11 July 2019 in a 2–0 defeat to Maccabi Haifa during the UEFA Europa League qualifying stages. He scored his first goal later that season, netting the go-ahead goal in a 3–1 victory over Aluminij. In August 2020, Cipot extended his contract with the club for a further two years, to 2024, while it was previously set to expire in June 2022.

During the 2021–22 season, Cipot underwent a position change, switching from forward to defender. He cemented his place in the first team over the course of the 2022–23 season, appearing in almost every league match for the club over the course of the season. In January 2023, he once again signed a contract extension, tying him to the club until 2026. During the opening match of the 2023–24 season, Cipot suffered a thigh injury which sidelined him through April 2024. As a result, he appeared in just six league matches over the course of the campaign.

== Personal life ==
Cipot's father, Fabijan, played internationally for Slovenia. His younger brother, Tio, is also a professional footballer. His grandfather, Emil, also played in Mura's youth ranks during his early career.

== Career statistics ==
=== Club ===
As of match played 18 May 2024

Appearances and goals by club, season and competition
Club	Season	League			National cup		Continental		Total	
Club	Season	Division	Apps	Goals	Apps	Goals	Apps	Goals	Apps	Goals
Mura	2019–20	Slovenian PrvaLiga	16	2	3	1	1 (Note: Appearance(s) in UEFA Europa League)	0	20	3
Mura	2020–21	Slovenian PrvaLiga	32	3	1	0	2	0	35	3
Mura	2021–22	Slovenian PrvaLiga	19	3	1	0	12 (Note: Four appearances in UEFA Champions League, three appearances in UEFA Europa League, five appearances in UEFA Europa Conference League)	0	32	3
Mura	2022–23	Slovenian PrvaLiga	34	2	1	0	2 (Note: Appearance(s) in UEFA Europa Conference League)	0	37	2
Mura	2023–24	Slovenian PrvaLiga	6	0	1	0	—		7	0
Mura	Total		107	10	7	1	17	0	131	11
Career total			107	10	7	1	17	0	131	11

== Honours ==
Mura

- Slovenian PrvaLiga: 2020–21
- Slovenian Football Cup: 2019–20
