= Žan Trontelj =

Slovenian footballer

Personal information
- Full name: Žan Trontelj
- Date of birth: 21 January 2000 (age 26)
- Place of birth: Grosuplje, Slovenia
- Height: 1.77 m (5 ft 10 in)
- Position: Right-back

Team information
- Current team: Dunajská Streda
- Number: 23

Youth career
- 2014–2017: Bravo

Senior career*
Years	Team	Apps	(Gls)
2017–2023	Bravo	125	(2)
2023–2024	Mura	29	(2)
2024–2026	Zorya Luhansk	26	(0)
2025–2026	→ Gorica (loan)	33	(3)
2026–	Dunajská Streda	8	(0)

International career^{‡}
2015	Slovenia U16	2	(0)
2016–2017	Slovenia U17	5	(0)
2017–2018	Slovenia U18	2	(0)
2018–2019	Slovenia U19	10	(0)
2020–2022	Slovenia U21	6	(0)
- * Club domestic league appearances and goals as of 21 September 2026 ‡ National team caps and goals as of 24 February 2025

Žan Trontelj (born 21 January 2000) is a Slovenian professional footballer who plays as a right-back for Dunajská Streda.

== Club career ==
=== Zorya Luhansk ===
Žan Trontelj signed for Zorya Luhansk on 24 June 2024.
