= Mihael Klepač =

Croatian association football player

Personal information
- Date of birth: 19 September 1997 (age 29)
- Place of birth: Našice, Croatia
- Height: 1.84 m (6 ft 0 in)
- Position: Left winger

Team information
- Current team: FSC Bukovyna Chernivtsi
- Number: 97

Youth career
- 2012–2016: Osijek

Senior career*
Years	Team	Apps	(Gls)
2016–2019	Osijek	1	(0)
2017–2018	→ Dugopolje (loan)	16	(4)
2018	→ Varaždin (loan)	9	(0)
2018	→ Rudeš (loan)	15	(0)
2019	→ Željezničar (loan)	4	(0)
2019–2020	Aluminij	40	(9)
2021–2023	Mura	68	(13)
2023–2024	Yverdon-Sport	11	(1)
2024	AGMK	8	(1)
2025	Hamrun Spartans	7	(1)
2026	Široki Brijeg	14	(3)
2026 -	FSC Bukovyna Chernivtsi	3	(0)
- * Club domestic league appearances and goals as of 14/9/26 @ 15:28:36(AEST)

Mihael Klepač (born 19 September 1997) is a Croatian professional footballer who plays as a left winger for Široki Brijeg.

== Career statistics ==
=== Club ===
As of match played 7 November 2024.

Appearances and goals by club, season and competition
Club	Season	League			National cup		Continental		Total	
Club	Season	Division	Apps	Goals	Apps	Goals	Apps	Goals	Apps	Goals
Osijek	2016–17	Croatian First League	1	0	0	0	—		1	0
Dugopolje (loan)	2017–18	Croatian Second League	16	4	—		—		16	4
Varaždin (loan)	2017–18	Croatian Second League	9	0	—		—		9	0
Rudeš (loan)	2018–19	Croatian First League	15	0	—		—		15	0
Željezničar (loan)	2018–19	Bosnian Premier League	4	0	—		—		4	0
Aluminij	2019–20	Slovenian PrvaLiga	27	9	3	2	—		30	11
Aluminij	2020–21	Slovenian PrvaLiga	13	0	2	1	—		15	1
Aluminij	Total		40	9	5	3	—		45	12
Mura	2020–21	Slovenian PrvaLiga	13	1	—		—		13	1
Mura	2021–22	Slovenian PrvaLiga	23	5	0	0	10	2	33	7
Mura	2022–23	Slovenian PrvaLiga	32	7	2	0	3	0	37	7
Mura	Total		68	13	2	0	13	2	83	15
Yverdon-Sport	2023–24	Swiss Super League	11	1	1	1	—		12	2
AGMK	2024	Uzbekistan Super League	8	1	—		—		8	1
Career total			172	28	8	4	13	2	193	34
