= Agron Šalja =

Slovenian footballer (born 1972)

Personal information
- Date of birth: 20 August 1972 (age 54)
- Place of birth: Vevče, SFR Yugoslavia
- Position: Midfielder

Senior career*
Years	Team	Apps	(Gls)
1991–1993	Olimpija	29	(0)
1993–1996	Primorje	45	(2)
1997	Olimpija	0	(0)
1997–1998	Vevče	10	(1)
1998–2001	Domžale	80	(8)
2002	Triglav Kranj	10	(0)
2002–2007	Interblock	124	(29)
Total		298	(40)

Managerial career
- 2016–2017: Slovenia U15
- 2016–2017: Slovenia U17
- 2018–2021: Slovenia U19
- 2021: Slovenia U17
- 2021: Celje
- 2023: Gorica
- 2023–2024: Krka
- 2024–2025: Mura (general manager)
- * Club domestic league appearances and goals

Agron Šalja (Albanian: Agron Shala; born 20 August 1972) is a Slovenian football manager and former player who manages Krka.

== Early life ==
Šalja was born on 20 August 1972. Born in the Socialist Federal Republic of Yugoslavia, he is a native of Ljubljana, Slovenia.

== Playing career ==
Slovenian news website Siol wrote in 2021 that Šalja was "once one of the most promising national players in Yugoslavia". In 1991, he started his career with Olimpija. Two years later, he signed for Primorje. Four years later, he signed for Vevče, before signing for Domžale in 1998. Subsequently, he signed for Triglav Kranj in 2002 and then Interblock the same year.

== Managerial career ==
Šalja started his managerial career with managed Slovenian side Celje, where he was described as "led them to stay in the first league competition in the 2020/21 season". Previously, he managed Slovenia national youth teams. Following his stint with Celje, he was appointed manager of Gorica in 2023. The same year, he was appointed manager of Krka.
