= Sandi Ogrinec =

Slovenian footballer (born 1998)

Personal information
- Date of birth: 5 June 1998 (age 28)
- Place of birth: Slovenia
- Height: 1.83 m (6 ft 0 in)
- Position: Midfielder

Team information
- Current team: Borac Banja Luka
- Number: 98

Youth career
- 2005–2010: Krka
- 2010–2015: Bravo
- 2015–2017: Maribor

Senior career*
Years	Team	Apps	(Gls)
2016–2020	Maribor	12	(0)
2018–2019	→ Krško (loan)	29	(0)
2020–2021	Bravo	63	(7)
2022–2024	WSG Tirol	56	(5)
2024–	Borac Banja Luka	64	(7)

International career
2014–2015	Slovenia U17 (Note: Official competitive UEFA matches only.)	9	(0)
2015–2016	Slovenia U19	8	(0)
2020–2021	Slovenia U21	3	(0)
- * Club domestic league appearances and goals as of 20 September 2026

Sandi Ogrinec (born 5 June 1998) is a Slovenian professional footballer who plays as a midfielder for Bosnian Premier League club Borac Banja Luka.

== Club career ==
Ogrinec made his professional debut in Slovenian PrvaLiga for Maribor on 21 May 2016 in a game against Gorica.

== Career statistics ==
=== Club ===
As of match played 20 September 2026

Appearances and goals by club, season and competition
Club	Season	League			National cup (Note: Includes Slovenian Cup, Austrian Cup, Bosnian Cup)		Continental		Other		Total	
Club	Season	Division	Apps	Goals	Apps	Goals	Apps	Goals	Apps	Goals	Apps	Goals
Maribor	2015–16	Slovenian PrvaLiga	1	0	—		—		—		1	0
Maribor	2016–17	Slovenian PrvaLiga	6	0	1	0	—		—		7	0
Maribor	2017–18	Slovenian PrvaLiga	2	0	1	0	—		—		3	0
Maribor	2018–19	Slovenian PrvaLiga	0	0	0	0	—		—		0	0
Maribor	2019–20	Slovenian PrvaLiga	3	0	0	0	—		—		3	0
Maribor	Total		12	0	2	0	—		—		14	0
Krško (loan)	2017–18	Slovenian PrvaLiga	9	0	—		—		—		9	0
Krško (loan)	2018–19	Slovenian PrvaLiga	20	0	3	0	—		—		23	0
Krško (loan)	Total		29	0	3	0	—		—		32	0
Bravo	2019–20	Slovenian PrvaLiga	15	2	—		—		—		15	2
Bravo	2020–21	Slovenian PrvaLiga	29	1	1	0	—		—		30	1
Bravo	2021–22	Slovenian PrvaLiga	19	4	2	1	—		—		21	5
Bravo	Total		63	7	3	1	—		—		66	8
WSG Tirol	2021–22	Austrian Bundesliga	11	1	—		—		3 (Note: Appearances in the 2021–22 Austrian Bundesliga Europa Conference League play-offs)	0	14	1
WSG Tirol	2022–23	Austrian Bundesliga	18	3	2	0	—		—		20	3
WSG Tirol	2023–24	Austrian Bundesliga	27	1	2	0	—		—		29	1
WSG Tirol	Total		56	5	4	0	—		3	0	63	5
Borac Banja Luka	2024–25	Bosnian Premier League	26	6	4	1	10 (Note: Appearances in UEFA Conference League)	2	—		40	9
Borac Banja Luka	2025–26	Bosnian Premier League	30	1	1	0	2	0	—		33	1
Borac Banja Luka	2026–27	Bosnian Premier League	8	0	0	0	7 (Note: Two appearances in UEFA Champions League, five appearances in UEFA Conference League)	0	—		15	0
Borac Banja Luka	Total		64	7	5	1	19	2	—		88	10
Career total			224	19	17	2	19	2	3	0	263	23
