= Klemen Pucko =

Slovenian footballer (born 1996)

Personal information
- Date of birth: 27 January 1996 (age 30)
- Height: 1.78 m (5 ft 10 in)
- Position: Left-back

Youth career
- –2008: Gančani
- 2008–2010: Mura 05
- 2011–2012: Maribor
- 2012–2013: Mura 05
- 2013–2015: Aluminij

Senior career*
Years	Team	Apps	(Gls)
2013	Mura 05	0	(0)
2015	Aluminij	3	(0)
2016–2025	Mura	192	(3)

International career
2011–2012	Slovenia U16	8	(0)
2012–2013	Slovenia U17	2	(0)
2014	Slovenia U19	1	(0)
- * Club domestic league appearances and goals

Klemen Pucko (born 27 January 1996) is a Slovenian former professional footballer who played as a defender.
