= Marko Zalokar =

Slovenian footballer

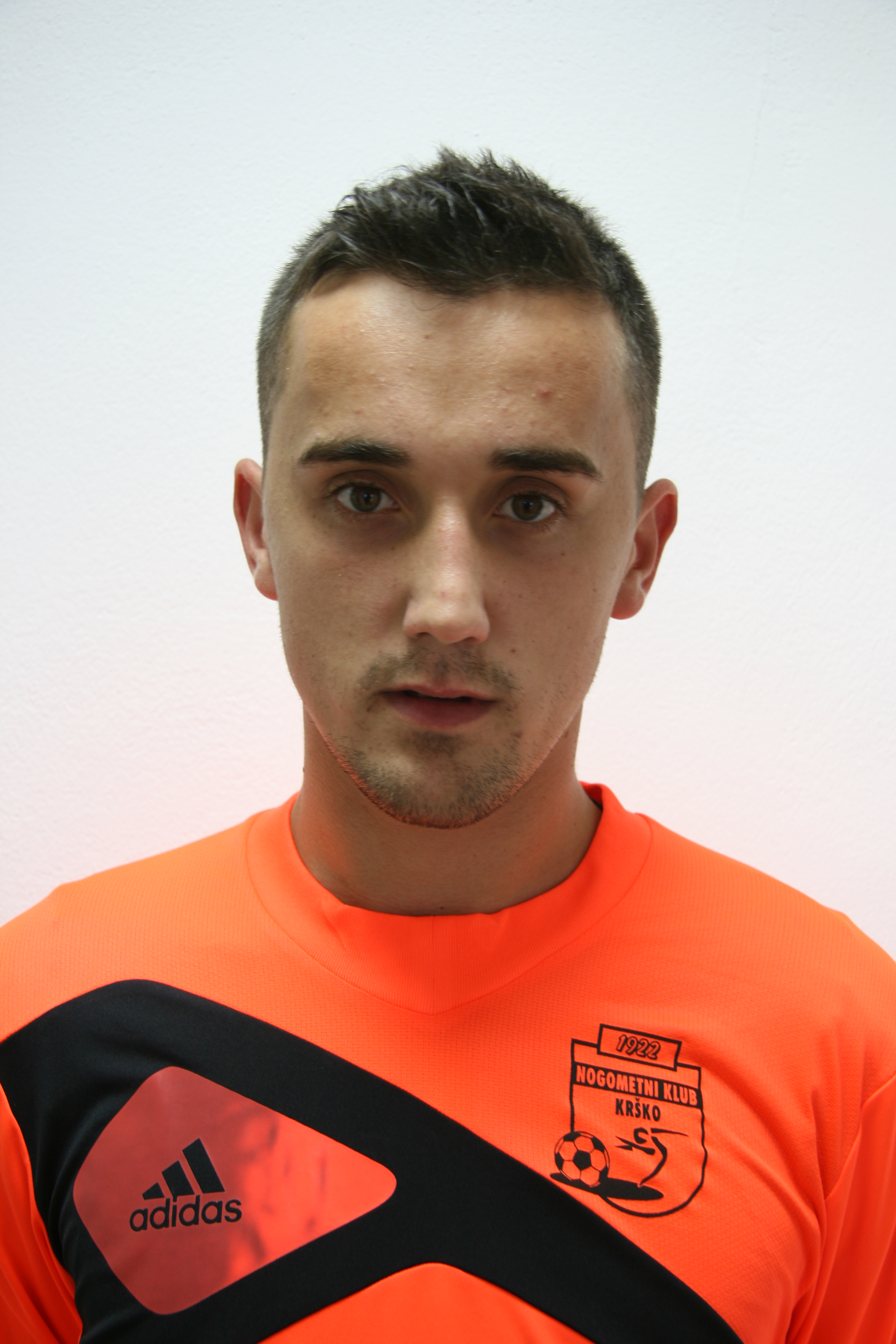

Personal information
- Date of birth: 18 June 1990 (age 36)
- Place of birth: Brežice, SFR Yugoslavia
- Height: 1.91 m (6 ft 3 in)
- Position: Goalkeeper

Team information
- Current team: Krško Posavje

Youth career
- 1997–2008: Krško

Senior career*
Years	Team	Apps	(Gls)
2008–2020	Krško	227	(0)
2020–2022	Mura	20	(0)
2022–2024	Maribor	0	(0)
2024–	Krško Posavje	0	(0)
- * Club domestic league appearances and goals as of 7 August 2024

Marko Zalokar (born 18 June 1990) is a Slovenian footballer who plays as a goalkeeper for Krško Posavje.
