= Marko Brkić (footballer) =

Bosnian footballer

Personal information
- Date of birth: 11 April 2000 (age 26)
- Place of birth: Banja Luka, Bosnia and Herzegovina
- Height: 1.91 m (6 ft 3 in)
- Position: Midfielder

Team information
- Current team: Banja Luka
- Number: 5

Youth career
- Red Star Belgrade

Senior career*
| Years | Team | Apps | (Gls) |
| 2018–2019 | FK Zvijezda 09 | 24 | (0) |
| 2019–2022 | NŠ Mura | 29 | (0) |
| 2022– | Borac Banja Luka | 0 | (0) |

International career
- Bosnia and Herzegovina U17
- Bosnia and Herzegovina U19
- * Club domestic league appearances and goals as of 4 April 2022

Marko Brkić (born 11 April 2000) is a Bosnian football midfielder who plays for Borac Banja Luka.
