= Haris Kadrić =

Slovenian professional football player

Personal information
- Date of birth: 16 March 2000 (age 26)
- Place of birth: Velenje, Slovenia
- Height: 1.88 m (6 ft 2 in)
- Position: Forward

Team information
- Current team: Novi Pazar (on loan from Kauno Žalgiris)
- Number: 18

Youth career
- –2016: Rudar Velenje
- 2016–2017: Bravo

Senior career*
Years	Team	Apps	(Gls)
2017–2018	Bravo	20	(11)
2018–2021	Olimpija Ljubljana	20	(2)
2019	→ Rudar Velenje (loan)	7	(0)
2020	→ Triglav Kranj (loan)	4	(3)
2020–2022	Aluminij	39	(5)
2022	Kolubara	18	(1)
2023	Voždovac	10	(1)
2023	Podbeskidzie Bielsko-Biała	11	(0)
2024	Gorica	12	(5)
2024–2025	Nafta 1903	15	(0)
2025–2026	Primorje	48	(13)
2026–	Kauno Žalgiris	3	(1)
2026–	→ Novi Pazar (loan)	2	(0)

International career
2017–2018	Slovenia U18	5	(4)
2018–2019	Slovenia U19	6	(1)
2019	Slovenia U21	1	(1)
- * Club domestic league appearances and goals as of 19 September 2026

Haris Kadrić (born 16 March 2000) is a Slovenian professional footballer who plays as a forward for Serbian SuperLiga club Novi Pazar on loan from Lithuanian club Kauno Žalgiris.

== Club career ==
Kadrić started his career with Rudar Velenje, before moving to Bravo in 2016.

In 2018, Kadrić signed with Olimpija Ljubljana, with whom he won the 2018–19 Slovenian Football Cup after defeating Maribor in the final. He is also youngest goalscorer for Olimpija in European qualifying competitions after scoring at the age of 18 years, 4 months and 10 days in a 5–1 win against Crusaders in UEFA Europa League qualifications.

He went on to represent Triglav Kranj and Aluminij in Slovenian PrvaLiga and Slovenian Second League, as well as Serbian sides Kolubara and Voždovac.

On 26 July 2023, he joined Polish second division club Podbeskidzie Bielsko-Biała. After making 13 appearances across all competitions, he left the club by mutual consent on 30 December 2023.

On 23 January 2024, Kadrić returned to Slovenia to sign with Gorica.

== International career ==
Kadrić was part of the Slovenia U17 and U19 teams, for whom he scored five goals in 11 matches.

Kadrić received a call-up to the under-21s for June 2019 friendlies against Switzerland and Georgia, scoring on his debut against the latter in a 1–1 draw.

== Honours ==
Olimpija Ljubljana

- Slovenian Football Cup: 2018–19
