= Žan Bešir =

Slovenian professional footballer

Personal information
- Full name: Žan Bešir
- Date of birth: 17 October 2000 (age 26)
- Place of birth: Postojna, Slovenia
- Position: Midfielder

Team information
- Current team: Dundee
- Number: 17

Youth career
- Primorje
- Koper

Senior career*
Years	Team	Apps	(Gls)
2019–2023	Koper	33	(2)
2021	→ Jadran Dekani (loan)	7	(2)
2022–2023	→ Gorica (loan)	14	(0)
2023	→ Tabor Sežana (loan)	7	(0)
2023–2026	Primorje	82	(15)
2024	→ Nafta 1903 (loan)	11	(1)
2026–	Dundee	5	(0)

International career^{‡}
2021	Slovenia U21	1	(0)
- * Club domestic league appearances and goals as of 14:21, 8 November 2026 (UTC) ‡ National team caps and goals as of 12 November 2021

Žan Bešir (born 17 October 2000) is a Slovenian professional footballer who plays as a midfielder for Scottish Premiership club Dundee.

== Career ==
=== Koper and loans ===
Bešir made his senior debut for FC Koper on 18 September 2019 in a Slovenian Cup match away to NK Maribor, where he scored both a goal and an own goal as he helped seal an upset victory for the then Slovenian Second League side. While with Koper, Bešir became a regular substitute player during their 2021–22 title race which they narrowly lost to Maribor while later lifting Slovenian Cup that season against NK Bravo. Bešir also went on several loans while at Koper, playing for NK Jadran Dekani in the Second League and for ND Gorica and NK Tabor Sežana in the Slovenian PrvaLiga.

=== Primorje and Nafta ===
In July 2023, Bešir signed for Slovenian Second League club ND Primorje. In January 2024, despite having started well for his new team, he was sent on loan to Primorje's promotion rivals NK Nafta 1903. After PrvaLiga club NK Rogaška failed to obtain a license, Bešir enjoyed two promotions in one season with Nafta getting automatically promoted alongside his parent club, Primorje.

Returning to Primorje in the top flight, Bešir made headlines for scoring against his previous loan team, Nafta, in October 2024. Bešir followed this up with a great November, culminating in being named as the PrvaLiga Player of the Month.

=== Dundee ===
On 8 July 2026, after attending a pre-season trip to Hungary with the club, Bešir signed a two-year deal with Scottish Premiership club Dundee with an option of another year. Bešir made his debut for the Dark Blues on 14 July in a Scottish League Cup group stage win away to Annan Athletic.

=== International ===
On 12 November 2021, Bešir made his debut for the Slovenia national under-21 football team, coming on as a substitute in a 2023 UEFA Euro qualifier victory over Albania U21.

== Career statistics ==
As of match played 7 November 2026

Appearances and goals by club, season and competition
Club	Season	League			National cup		League cup		Other		Total	
Club	Season	Division	Apps	Goals	Apps	Goals	Apps	Goals	Apps	Goals	Apps	Goals
Koper	2019–20	Slovenian Second League	9	0	3	1	—		—		12	1
Koper	2020–21	Slovenian PrvaLiga	7	0	1	0	—		—		8	0
Koper	2021–22	Slovenian PrvaLiga	19	2	1	0	—		—		20	2
Koper	2022–23	Slovenian PrvaLiga	0	0	0	0	—		—		0	0
Koper	2023–24	Slovenian PrvaLiga	0	0	0	0	—		—		0	0
Koper	Total		35	2	5	1	0	0	0	0	40	3
Jadran Dekani (loan)	2020–21	Slovenian Second League	7	2	—		—		0	0	7	2
Gorica (loan)	2022–23	Slovenian PrvaLiga	14	0	—		—		—		14	0
Tabor Sežana (loan)	2022–23	Slovenian PrvaLiga	7	0	1	0	—		—		8	0
Primorje	2023–24	Slovenian Second League	17	5	1	1	—		—		18	6
Primorje	2024–25	Slovenian PrvaLiga	33	5	2	0	—		—		35	5
Primorje	2025–26	Slovenian PrvaLiga	32	5	1	0	—		1 (Note: Appearance in PrvaLiga play-off)	0	34	5
Primorje	Total		82	15	4	1	0	0	1	0	87	16
Nafta 1903 (loan)	2023–24	Slovenian Second League	11	1	1	0	—		—		12	1
Dundee	2026–27	Scottish Premiership	5	0	0	0	3	0	0	0	8	0
Career total			161	20	11	2	3	0	1	0	176	22

== Honours ==
FC Koper

- Slovenian Football Cup: 2021–22
