= Matko Obradović =

Croatian footballer (born 1991)

Personal information
- Date of birth: 11 May 1991 (age 35)
- Place of birth: Dubrovnik, SFR Yugoslavia
- Height: 1.83 m (6 ft 0 in)
- Position: Goalkeeper

Team information
- Current team: Palm City
- Number: 77

Youth career
- –2006: Orebić
- 2006–2007: Jadran LP
- 2007–2010: Mosor

Senior career*
Years	Team	Apps	(Gls)
2009–2010	Mosor	13	(0)
2011–2012	Koper	0	(0)
2012–2014	Krka	70	(0)
2014–2018	Maribor	7	(0)
2018–2022	Mura	112	(0)
2022–2024	Celje	24	(0)
2025–	Palm City	0	(0)
- * Club domestic league appearances and goals as of 5 December 2024

Matko Obradović (born 11 May 1991) is a Croatian footballer who plays for UAE Second Division League side Palm City as a goalkeeper.

== Career ==
Obradović, coming from the Pelješac peninsula, played in his hometown Orebić, before moving for a season to Jadran LP, and then, aged 16, to a trial at Hajduk Split. After a few test matches there, he joined the nearby Druga HNL team Mosor. There, while a member of the under-19 team, he played 13 matches for the senior team, and, in the summer of 2010, won the Croatian U19 amateur championship.

After that, he joined Koper in early 2011. Not getting a single cap for the first team, he signed for Krka in the Slovenian Second League. Achieving promotion to the Slovenian PrvaLiga, Obradović was selected in the best team of the 2013–14 season. After that, he moved to Maribor, where he won two league championships, and played two times in the group stage of the UEFA Champions League. After four years at Maribor, he moved to Mura in 2018. With Mura, he won the 2020–21 Slovenian PrvaLiga, which was the first ever league title of the club.

== Honours ==
Maribor

- Slovenian PrvaLiga: 2014–15, 2016–17
- Slovenian Cup: 2015–16

Mura

- Slovenian PrvaLiga: 2020–21
- Slovenian Cup: 2019–20

Celje

- Slovenian PrvaLiga: 2023–24
