= Andraž Žinič =

Slovenian footballer

Personal information
- Date of birth: 12 February 1999 (age 27)
- Place of birth: Ljubljana, Slovenia
- Height: 1.79 m (5 ft 10 in)
- Position: Right-back

Team information
- Current team: Triglav Kranj

Youth career
- Komenda
- 2010–2018: Domžale

Senior career*
Years	Team	Apps	(Gls)
2018–2022	Domžale	70	(1)
2018–2019	→ Dob (loan)	30	(2)
2022–2024	Maribor	33	(0)
2024–	Triglav Kranj	0	(0)

International career
2015–2016	Slovenia U17	9	(0)
2016	Slovenia U18	1	(0)
2021	Slovenia U21	3	(0)
- * Club domestic league appearances and goals as of 5 September 2024

Andraž Žinič (born 12 February 1999) is a Slovenian footballer who plays as a right-back for Triglav Kranj.

== Club career ==
Žinič made his Slovenian PrvaLiga debut for Domžale on 23 February 2020 in a game against Mura.

On 29 July 2022, he signed a three-year contract with Maribor.
