= Fabijan Cipot =

Slovenian footballer (born 1976)

Personal information
- Date of birth: 25 August 1976 (age 50)
- Place of birth: Murska Sobota, SFR Yugoslavia
- Height: 1.92 m (6 ft 4 in)
- Position: Defender

Youth career
- Mura

Senior career*
Years	Team	Apps	(Gls)
1996–1999	Mura	84	(20)
2000–2002	Maribor	55	(7)
2003	Al Sadd SC		
2003–2005	Al-Arabi SC		
2006	Nafta Lendava	12	(2)
2006–2007	Maribor	31	(1)
2007–2008	Luzern	12	(0)
2008–2011	Rudar Velenje	99	(11)
2011–2013	Mura 05	46	(2)

International career
1999–2007	Slovenia	26	(0)
- * Club domestic league appearances and goals

Fabijan Cipot (born 25 August 1976) is a retired Slovenian football defender.

== Club career ==
Cipot started his career at his hometown club Bakovci. As a youngster he moved to the nearby Mura. He made his Mura debut on 7 May 1997 in a 1. SNL tie with Rudar Velenje. In the following season he established himself as a regular first team player. In January 2000 he left Mura and signed with Maribor. After four seasons with Maribor, he moved to Qatar, where he played for Al-Sadd SC and Al-Arabi SC. After three seasons in Qatar, he returned to Europe. His trial in summer 2005 at Norwegian Brann ended with injury suffered in a friendly match against Birmingham City. He returned in spring 2006, playing for Nafta Lendava. In summer 2006 he signed with Maribor. After a year in Maribor, he moved to Swiss side Lucerne. In February 2008 he left Lucerne and signed with Rudar Velenje. In June 2011 he left Rudar Velenje and signed a contract with Mura 05.

== International career ==
Cipot made his debut for Slovenia in a February 1999 friendly match against Switzerland, and earned a total of 26 caps.

== Personal life ==
Cipot's sons Kai and Tio are also professional footballers.
