= Nik Lorbek =

Slovenian footballer (born 1996)

Personal information
- Date of birth: 17 April 1996 (age 30)
- Height: 1.83 m (6 ft 0 in)
- Position: Defensive midfielder

Team information
- Current team: SV Bad Schwanberg
- Number: 18

Youth career
- Pobrežje
- 2010–2015: Maribor

Senior career*
Years	Team	Apps	(Gls)
2014–2017	Maribor B	70	(16)
2017–2019	Mura	59	(5)
2019–2021	Union SG	8	(0)
2021–2023	Mura	32	(0)
2023–	SV Bad Schwanberg	12	(1)

International career
2011–2012	Slovenia U16	8	(0)
2012–2013	Slovenia U17	10	(1)
2013	Slovenia U18	5	(1)
2013–2014	Slovenia U19	18	(0)
- * Club domestic league appearances and goals as of 15 December 2023

Nik Lorbek (born 17 April 1996) is a Slovenian footballer who plays as a midfielder for SV Bad Schwanberg.

== Career ==
Lorbek spent most of his youth career with Maribor. At the age of 18, he was promoted to the club's reserve team, Maribor B, where he played for three seasons in the Slovenian Third League.

Lorbek moved to Slovenian Second League side Mura in June 2017. In his first season with Mura, they were promoted to the Slovenian First League, and in his second they qualified for the UEFA Europa League. In the summer of 2019, he moved to Belgium and joined Royale Union Saint-Gilloise.

In July 2021, Lorbek returned to Mura, where he stayed until January 2023 when he mutually terminated his contract.

== Honours ==
Mura

- Slovenian Second League: 2017–18

Union SG

- Belgian First Division B: 2020–21
