= Tio Cipot =

Slovenian footballer (born 2003)

Personal information
- Date of birth: 20 April 2003 (age 23)
- Place of birth: Murska Sobota, Slovenia
- Height: 1.85 m (6 ft 1 in)
- Positions: Midfielder; winger

Team information
- Current team: Maribor
- Number: 7

Youth career
- –2013: Mura 05
- 2013–2022: Mura

Senior career*
Years	Team	Apps	(Gls)
2020–2023	Mura	44	(4)
2023–2026	Spezia	17	(0)
2024–2026	→ Grazer AK (loan)	42	(8)
2026–	Maribor	31	(6)

International career
2021	Slovenia U18	2	(0)
2021	Slovenia U19	5	(0)
2022–2025	Slovenia U21	20	(8)
- * Club domestic league appearances and goals as of 22 November 2026

Tio Cipot (born 20 April 2003) is a Slovenian professional footballer who plays as a midfielder for Slovenian PrvaLiga club Maribor.

== Club career ==
Born in Murska Sobota, Cipot is a youth product of his hometown side Mura. He made his senior debut for the club on 19 July 2020 in a league match against Aluminij.

Cipot transferred to Serie A side Spezia in January 2023 for an alleged transfer fee of €700,000, signing a contract with the club until 2027. He made his Serie A debut on 27 January, replacing João Moutinho in the 67th minute of a 2–0 home win against Bologna.

== International career ==
Cipot was a youth international for Slovenia and represented the country at the under-18, under-19 and under-21 levels. He made his under-21 debut on 26 September 2022 against Bosnia and Herzegovina, scoring a brace in a 3–2 defeat.

== Personal life ==
Cipot's father, Fabijan, played internationally for Slovenia. His elder brother, Kai, is also a professional footballer.
