= Ivan Kontek =

Croatian footballer

Personal information
- Date of birth: 29 January 1997 (age 29)
- Place of birth: Zagreb, Croatia
- Height: 1.88 m (6 ft 2 in)
- Position: Defender

Team information
- Current team: Casertana
- Number: 4

Youth career
- –2007: Maksimir
- 2007–2008: Dubrava
- 2008–2011: Dinamo Zagreb
- 2011–2012: Croatia Sesvete
- 2012–2013: Zagreb
- 2013–2014: Tekstilac Ravnice
- 2014: Lokomotiva
- 2014–2015: Tekstilac Ravnice
- 2015–2016: Sesvete

Senior career*
Years	Team	Apps	(Gls)
2015–2018	Sesvete	51	(3)
2018	Lokomotiva	0	(0)
2018	→ Sesvete (loan)	10	(0)
2018–2020	Aluminij	59	(0)
2020–2022	Ternana	37	(1)
2022–2023	Cesena	5	(0)
2023	→ Foggia (loan)	14	(0)
2023–2024	Virtus Entella	8	(0)
2024	Catania	14	(1)
2024–	Casertana	58	(1)
- * Club domestic league appearances and goals as of 1 May 2026

Ivan Kontek (born 29 January 1997) is a Croatian professional footballer who plays as a defender for Serie C Group C club Casertana.

== Club career ==
He made his professional Slovenian PrvaLiga debut for Aluminij on 20 July 2018 in a game against Celje.

On 19 September 2020, he signed a two-year contract with Italian third-tier Serie C club Ternana. For the 2021–22 season, Ternana was promoted to Serie B.

On 9 July 2022, Kontek joined Cesena on a two-year deal. On 5 January 2023, Kontek moved on loan to Foggia. During football season Kontek played 5 matches. Anyway, he struck the decisive goal at the last minute of the extra time in the match over Cerignola during play-off tournament. The draw allowed the team through to the semi-finals. Foggia held an obligation to purchase his rights if the club gained promotion to Serie B at the end of the 2022–23 season. They were not promoted.

On 24 August 2023, Kontek signed with Virtus Entella.
