= Dario Kolobarić =

Slovenian footballer (born 2000)

Personal information
- Date of birth: 6 February 2000 (age 26)
- Place of birth: Teslić, Bosnia and Herzegovina
- Height: 1.84 m (6 ft 0 in)
- Position: Forward

Youth career
- Idrija
- 2014–2015: Bravo
- 2015–2019: Domžale
- 2016–2017: → Red Bull Salzburg (loan)

Senior career*
Years	Team	Apps	(Gls)
2019–2021	Domžale	41	(14)
2020	→ Dob (loan)	1	(1)
2021–2022	Shakhtyor Soligorsk	5	(1)
2022	Koper	15	(0)
2023	Gorica	14	(5)
2023–2025	Domžale	27	(1)

International career
2015–2016	Slovenia U16	8	(2)
2016–2017	Slovenia U17	8	(1)
2017–2018	Slovenia U18	2	(0)
2018–2019	Slovenia U19	8	(2)
2021–2022	Slovenia U21	4	(0)
- * Club domestic league appearances and goals as of 1 February 2026

Dario Kolobarić (born 6 February 2000) is a Slovenian professional footballer who plays as a forward.

== Career ==
In 2016, Kolobarić joined the youth academy of Red Bull Salzburg from Domžale.

Before the second half of the 2019–20 season, Domžale sent him on loan to Dob in the Slovenian second division.

On 3 September 2021, Kolobarić joined Belarusian Premier League team Shakhtyor Soligorsk for an undisclosed fee.
