= Tomislav Mrkonjić =

Croatian footballer (born 1994)

Personal information
- Date of birth: 22 February 1994 (age 32)
- Place of birth: Split, Croatia
- Height: 1.84 m (6 ft 0 in)
- Positions: Attacking midfielder; winger

Team information
- Current team: Posušje
- Number: 62

Youth career
- Croatia Zmijavci
- Hajduk Split
- Dinamo Zagreb
- RNK Split

Senior career*
Years	Team	Apps	(Gls)
2014–2016	RNK Split	4	(0)
2015–2016	→ Imotski (loan)	29	(11)
2016–2017	Croatia Zmijavci	16	(11)
2017	Hajduk Split II	14	(1)
2017–2018	Croatia Zmijavci		
2018–2020	Rudeš	27	(4)
2020–2022	Croatia Zmijavci	40	(22)
2022	Radomlje	16	(8)
2022–2023	PEC Zwolle	10	(3)
2025–	Posušje	7	(0)
- * Club domestic league appearances and goals as of 1 June 2025

Tomislav Mrkonjić (born 22 February 1994) is a Croatian professional footballer who plays as an attacking midfielder or winger for Posušje.

== Career ==
Mrkonjić played with Imotski from 2015 to 2016, on loan from RNK Split, and made 29 appearances in the Croatian Second League over the course of two seasons.

During the 2016–17 season, Mrkonjić returned to play for his hometown club, Croatia Zmijavci, a team in the Croatian Third League. He was proclaimed as the best player of the first half of the season, in which Mrkonjić scored 11 goals and made 13 assists in 16 appearances.

In July 2018 he joined Croatian top division side Rudeš to help them in relegation battle. His first goals came in round 2 against Osijek, where he scored a brace in a 3–2 defeat.

In February 2020 he returned to Croatia Zmijavci, who were newly promoted to the second division.

Mrkonjić joined Dutch Eerste Divisie club PEC Zwolle on 6 July 2022, signing a two-year contract with an option for an additional year. On 26 June 2023, his contract with PEC Zwolle was terminated by mutual consent.
