= Amadej Maroša =

Slovenian footballer (born 1994)

Personal information
- Date of birth: 7 February 1994 (age 32)
- Place of birth: Murska Sobota, Slovenia
- Height: 1.77 m (5 ft 10 in)
- Position: Forward

Team information
- Current team: Nafta 1903
- Number: 17

Youth career
- –2007: Mura 05
- 2007–2008: Radgona
- 2008–2013: Mura 05

Senior career*
Years	Team	Apps	(Gls)
2013	Mura 05	2	(0)
2013–2015	Beltinci		
2015	UFC Fehring	3	(1)
2015–2016	Beltinci	20	(11)
2016–2022	Mura	168	(74)
2022	AEL Limassol	14	(6)
2022–2023	Górnik Zabrze	5	(0)
2023	Górnik Zabrze II	2	(0)
2023–2025	Mura	70	(19)
2025–	Nafta 1903	30	(20)
- * Club domestic league appearances and goals as of 17 July 2026

Amadej Maroša (born 7 February 1994) is a Slovenian professional footballer who plays as a forward for Nafta 1903.

== Career ==
On 25 November 2021, Maroša scored the winning goal in stoppage time for Mura in a 2–1 UEFA Europa Conference League win over Tottenham Hotspur.

== Honours ==
Mura

- Slovenian PrvaLiga: 2020–21
- Slovenian Cup: 2019–20
- Slovenian Second League: 2017–18
