= Saša Varga =

Belgian footballer

Personal information
- Date of birth: 19 February 1993 (age 33)
- Place of birth: Liège, Belgium
- Height: 1.88 m (6 ft 2 in)
- Position: Forward

Team information
- Current team: IMT
- Number: 24

Youth career
- Rad

Senior career*
Years	Team	Apps	(Gls)
2011–2013	Rad	11	(0)
2011–2012	→ Palić (loan)	24	(7)
2012	→ BASK (loan)	10	(1)
2014	Teleoptik	14	(2)
2015	Jumilla	5	(0)
2016	Bežanija	3	(0)
2017	Sinđelić Beograd	10	(2)
2018	Brda	30	(13)
2019	Radomlje	19	(13)
2020	Javor Ivanjica	6	(1)
2020–2022	Radomlje	31	(10)
2022	FCM Traiskirchen	12	(0)
2022–	IMT	1	(0)
- * Club domestic league appearances and goals as of 25 June 2023

Saša Varga (Serbian Cyrillic: Саша Варга; born 19 February 1993) is a Belgian professional footballer who plays as a forward for IMT.

== Career ==
Varga started out at Rad, making his Serbian SuperLiga debut in 2011. He later played for Slovenian clubs Brda and Radomlje. In January 2020, Varga returned to Serbia and signed with Javor Ivanjica.

== Personal life ==
Born in Liège, Belgium, Varga is the son of footballer Zvonko Varga.
