= Rok Kidrič =

Slovenian footballer (born 1995)

Personal information
- Date of birth: 27 April 1995 (age 31)
- Place of birth: Celje, Slovenia
- Height: 1.96 m (6 ft 5 in)
- Position: Forward

Youth career
- –2013: Celje

Senior career*
Years	Team	Apps	(Gls)
2014–2015	Celje	0	(0)
2014	→ Šmartno (loan)	23	(5)
2015	→ Dravinja (loan)	11	(2)
2015–2016	Drava	20	(6)
2016–2017	Dob	24	(19)
2017–2018	Ankaran	10	(2)
2018–2019	Aluminij	32	(10)
2019	Olimpija	21	(3)
2020	Boluspor	14	(1)
2020–2021	Bravo	19	(2)
2021	Aluminij	19	(2)
2022–2025	Puszcza Niepołomice	38	(9)
- * Club domestic league appearances and goals as of 15:39, 29 May 2025 (UTC)

Rok Kidrič (born 27 April 1995) is a Slovenian professional footballer who plays as a forward.

== Early life ==
Kidrič was born on 27 April 1995. Born in Celje, he is a native of Mestinje.

== Career ==
Kidrič started his career with NK Celje in 2014. Unused, he was loaned the same year to Slovenian side Šmartno, where he made twenty-three league appearances and scored five goals. Six months later, he was sent on loan to Dravinja, where he made eleven league appearances and scored two goals. Ahead of the 2015–16 season, he signed for Drava, where he made twenty league appearances and scored six goals, before signing for Ankaran in 2016, where he made twenty-four league appearances and scored nineteen goals.

One year later, he signed for Aluminij, where he was regarded as one of the club's most important players while playing for them and made thirty-two league appearances and scored ten goals. Subsequently, he signed for Slovenian side Olimpija in 2019, where he made twenty-one league appearances and scored three goals. The next year, he moved abroad for the first time by signing for Turkish side Boluspor, where he made fourteen league appearances and scored once. During the summer of 2020, he returned to his country and signed for Bravo, where he made nineteen league appearances and scored two goals. Following his stint there, he signed for Polish side Puszcza Niepołomice, helping the club achieve promotion from the second tier to the top flight.

== Style of play ==
Kidrič plays as a forward and is left-footed. Polish news website iGol.pl wrote in 2023 that he "is very useful in set pieces... is useful not only when the ball is crossed into the penalty area. He gives a lot of possibilities in the play".
