= Mustafa Nukić =

Slovenian footballer (born 1990)

Personal information
- Date of birth: 3 December 1990 (age 35)
- Place of birth: Vlasenica, SR Bosnia and Herzegovina, SFR Yugoslavia
- Height: 1.87 m (6 ft 2 in)
- Position: Forward

Youth career
- Svoboda Ljubljana
- Olimpija Ljubljana
- 2008–2009: Interblock

Senior career*
Years	Team	Apps	(Gls)
2007–2008	Svoboda Ljubljana	6	(1)
2008–2009	Interblock Svoboda	1	(0)
2009–2011	Interblock	0	(0)
2009–2010	→ Livar (loan)	5	(0)
2011	→ Zarica Kranj (loan)		
2011	Celje	2	(0)
2012	Radomlje	5	(0)
2012–2013	Svoboda Ljubljana	20	(26)
2013	Triglav Kranj	18	(3)
2014	Koper	4	(0)
2015	Ivančna Gorica	9	(1)
2015	Annabichler SV	15	(1)
2016–2018	Ilirija 1911	65	(38)
2018–2021	Bravo	91	(27)
2021–2024	Olimpija Ljubljana	71	(23)
2025	Slovan	29	(2)

International career
2008	Slovenia U18	4	(0)
- * Club domestic league appearances and goals

Mustafa Nukić (born 3 December 1990) is a Slovenian retired footballer who played as a forward.

In a journeyman career, he made over 150 Slovenian PrvaLiga appearances for Celje, Triglav Kranj, Koper, Bravo and Olimpija Ljubljana. He contributed 17 goals as Bravo won the Slovenian Second League in 2018–19.

== Career ==
Born in Vlasenica (now in Republika Srpska, Bosnia and Herzegovina), Nukić and his mother immigrated to Ljubljana, Slovenia when he was 18 months old due to the outbreak of the Bosnian War. He was raised in refugee accommodation in Vič, where he was joined by his father and stayed there until the sixth grade of primary school. Prohibited from going to kindergarten, he did not meet Slovenians until he began primary school. He was a childhood fan and youth player for Olimpija Ljubljana.

Nukić spent his early career with several teams in the Slovenian PrvaLiga and Slovenian Second League, including Koper, a team that he called the best organised in Slovenia, but also the worst experience of his career due to disagreements with manager Rodolfo Vanoli. For three years, he studied economics at university, while working for office supply company Extra Lux. He had the only foreign footballing experience of his career in 2015 at Annabichler SV in the Austrian Regionalliga (third tier), an experience he disliked because of the long driving distances.

Nukić transferred in July 2018 from Ilirija 1911 to Bravo. In 2018–19, he scored 17 goals as his team won the Second League title, but in the following campaign he scored only three goals in 34 games while adding six assists. In 2020–21, he was the league's top assist provider with eleven, as well as scoring seven goals.

On 25 June 2021, at the age of 30, he returned to Olimpija on a two-year deal. He made his professional debut for the team on 22 July in his first European match, in which he scored the only goal of a UEFA Europa Conference League second qualifying round first leg at home to Birkirkara of Malta. The Professional Footballers' Union of Slovenia named him in the Best XI of the season.

== Honours ==
Bravo

- Slovenian Second League: 2018–19

Olimpija Ljubljana

- Slovenian PrvaLiga: 2022–23
- Slovenian Cup: 2022–23
