= Loren Maružin =

Bulgarian footballer (born 2002)

Personal information
- Date of birth: 4 December 1997 (age 28)
- Place of birth: Pula, Croatia
- Height: 1.84 m (6 ft 0 in)
- Position: Winger

Team information
- Current team: Aluminij
- Number: 11

Youth career
- Rovinj

Senior career*
Years	Team	Apps	(Gls)
2017–2018	Istra 1961	2	(0)
2018	Pazinka Pazin	17	(5)
2018–2019	Jadran Poreč	17	(7)
2019–2021	Lokomotiva Zagreb	10	(0)
2020–2021	→ Orijent (loan)	16	(4)
2021–2022	Bravo	63	(7)
2023	Hebar	17	(1)
2023–	Aluminij	14	(0)
- * Club domestic league appearances and goals as of 26 March 2024

Loren Maružin (born 4 December 1997) is a Croatian footballer who plays as a winger for Slovenian PrvaLiga club Aluminij.
