= Luka Bobičanec =

Croatian footballer (born 1993)

Personal information
- Date of birth: 23 May 1993 (age 33)
- Place of birth: Čakovec, Croatia
- Height: 1.80 m (5 ft 11 in)
- Positions: Attacking midfielder; winger

Team information
- Current team: Mura
- Number: 8

Youth career
- 2002–2006: Dubrava Sivica
- 2007–2011: Međimurje

Senior career*
Years	Team	Apps	(Gls)
2010–2011	Međimurje	4	(0)
2011–2012	Čakovec	29	(6)
2012–2014	SV Stegersbach	21	(1)
2014–2015	SV Heiligenbrunn	43	(36)
2016	Nafta 1903	12	(13)
2016–2017	Polet Sv. Martin na Muri	29	(31)
2017–2022	Mura	156	(49)
2023–2024	Celje	48	(4)
2025	Hanoi FC	15	(3)
2025–	Mura	23	(4)
- * Club domestic league appearances and goals as of 22:37, 10 November 2026 (UTC)

Luka Bobičanec (born 23 May 1993) is a Croatian professional footballer who plays as a midfielder for Slovenian PrvaLiga club Mura.

== Club career ==
Bobičanec spent a few seasons in the Austrian lower leagues, with SV Stegersbach and SV Heiligenbrunn.

On 8 January 2025, Bobičanec signed for V.League 1 side Hanoi FC.

== Honours ==
Nafta 1903

- MNZ Lendava Cup: 2015–16

Polet Sveti Martin na Muri

- Međužupanijska nogometna liga Čakovec-Varaždin: 2016–17

Mura

- Slovenian First League: 2020–21
- Slovenian Second League: 2017–18
- Slovenian Cup: 2019–20

Celje

- Slovenian First League: 2023–24

Individual

- Slovenian Second League Player of the Year: 2017–18
- Slovenian Second League Team of the Year: 2017–18
