= Fazanerija City Stadium =

Stadium in Murska Sobota, Slovenia

Fazanerija
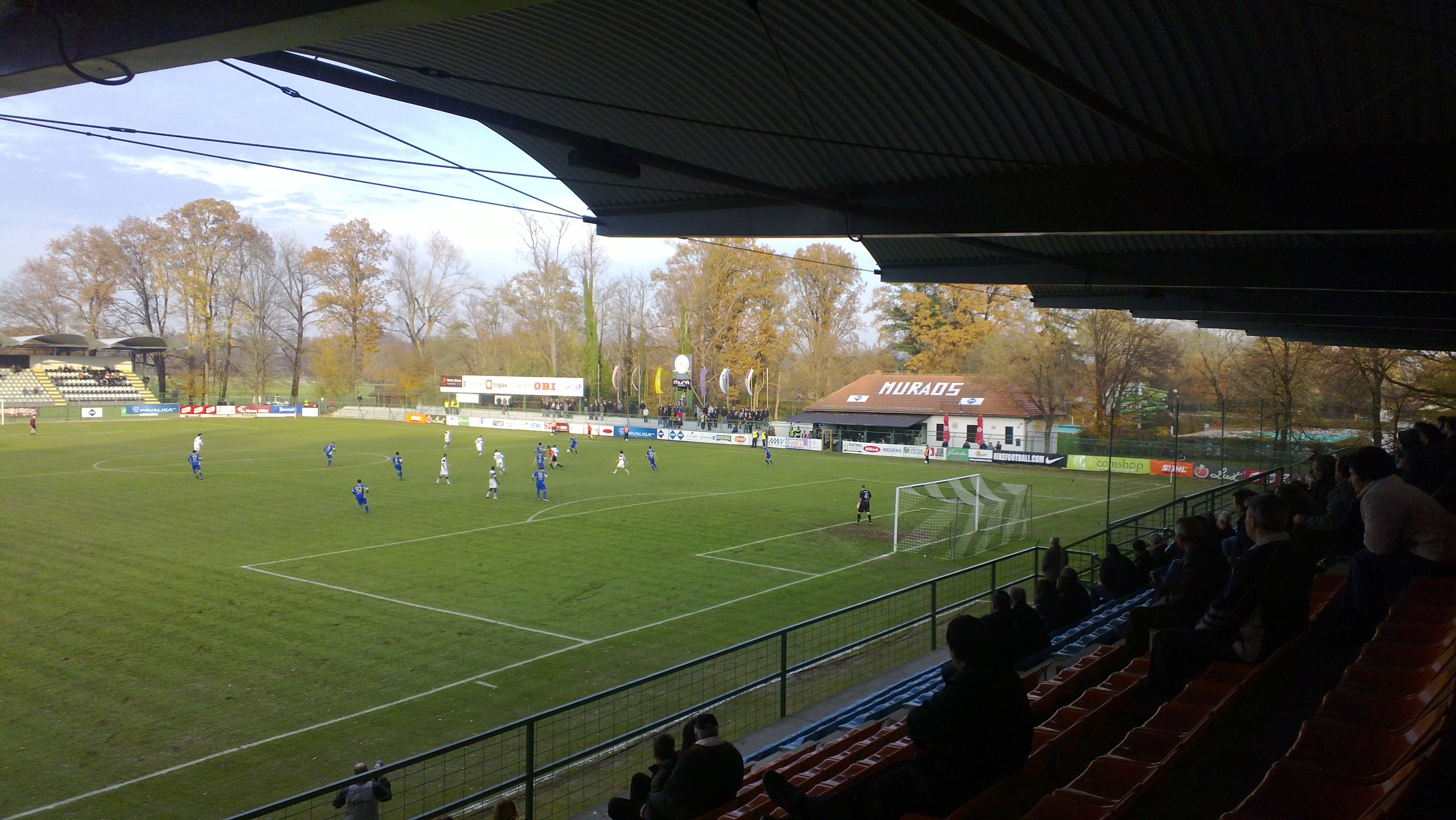
- Fazanerija in 2012
- Interactive map of Fazanerija
- Full name: Mestni stadion Fazanerija
- Former names: Stadion Viteškega Kralja Aleksandra I. Zedinitelja
- Location: Murska Sobota, Slovenia
- Coordinates: 46°40′6″N 16°9′27″E
- Owner: City Municipality of Murska Sobota
- Capacity: 4,506
- Record attendance: 6,000 (Mura 05 vs Nafta, 31 July 2011)
- Field size: 105 by 68 metres (114.8 yd × 74.4 yd)

Construction
- Built: 1935–1936
- Opened: 28 June 1936
- Renovated: 2001, 2019–2020, 2022
- Expanded: 1983, 1994, 2025–present

Tenants
- NK Mura (1936–2005); ND Mura 05 (2005–2013); NŠ Mura (2013–present); ŽNK Mura (2023–present)

Fazanerija City Stadium (Slovene: Mestni stadion Fazanerija) is a multi-use stadium in Murska Sobota, Slovenia. It is currently used mostly for football matches and is the home ground of NŠ Mura. The stadium was built in 1936 and has a capacity of 4,506 seats. With the standing area included, the total capacity of the stadium is around 4,700.

== History ==
In 1934, the Municipality of Murska Sobota contacted the architect Franc Novak and asked him to make plans for the stadium. The first pitch was completed by 1936. The stadium was officially opened on 28 June 1936, and became the home ground of the local football team SK Mura. Initially, the stadium was called Stadion Viteškega Kralja Aleksandra I. Zedinitelja, in honour of Alexander I of Yugoslavia. The cost of building the stadium was 160,000 Yugoslav dinar.

In the early 1980s, the stadium was expanded with the construction of a new main stand. A decade later, in 1994, two additional stands were built, located in the northern and southern parts of the stadium. In 2001, all stands were covered with a roof.

In 2017, the locker rooms underwent a complete reconstruction in accordance with UEFA standards. In 2019, Fazanerija received floodlights. In 2019 and 2020, the stadium underwent further renovations and adjustments, including new seats, renovation of the stand for away fans, renovation of the roof, renovation of the camera tower and the new press center.

== Events ==
The stadium is mainly used for football and is the home ground of NŠ Mura. Previously, the stadium was used by NK Mura and ND Mura 05, the clubs that were dissolved in 2005 and 2013, respectively. The stadium hosted three matches of the Slovenia national team, most recently in 2003. Fazanerija is also occasionally used as a venue for Slovenia's youth national teams and the Slovenia women's national team.

Slovenia national team matches
Date	Competition	Opponent	Result	Attendance
19 June 1991	Friendly	Croatia	0–1	4,000
22 April 1998	Friendly	Czech Republic	1–3	2,000
20 August 2003	Friendly	Hungary	2–1	4,000

== See also ==
- List of football stadiums in Slovenia
