= 2020–21 Slovenian PrvaLiga =

Slovenian PrvaLiga
- Season: 2020–21
- Dates: 22 August 2020 – 22 May 2021
- Champions: Mura (1st title)
- Relegated: Gorica
- Champions League: Mura
- Europa Conference League: Maribor; Olimpija Ljubljana; Domžale
- Matches: 180
- Goals: 422 (2.34 per match)
- Best player: Senijad Ibričić
- Top goalscorer: Jan Mlakar; Nardin Mulahusejnović (14 goals each)
- Highest attendance: 3,200; Maribor 1–3 Mura
- Lowest attendance: N/A^{a}

The 2020–21 Slovenian PrvaLiga was the 30th edition of the Slovenian PrvaLiga since its establishment in 1991. The season began on 22 August 2020 and ended on 22 May 2021.

Celje were the defending champions, having won their first title in the previous season. Mura won their first title after defeating Maribor in the final round. As champions, they qualified for the first qualifying round of the 2021–22 UEFA Champions League.

== Competition format ==
Each team played 36 matches (18 home and 18 away). Teams played four matches against each other (2 home and 2 away).

== Teams ==
Rudar Velenje and Triglav Kranj were relegated at the end of the previous season. Koper and Gorica joined the other eight teams in the league this season after gaining promotion from the Slovenian Second League.

=== Stadiums and locations ===
Seating capacity only; some stadiums also have standing areas.

Aluminij	Bravo	Celje	Domžale
Aluminij Sports Park	Šiška Sports Park	Stadion Z'dežele	Domžale Sports Park
Capacity: 600	Capacity: 2,308	Capacity: 13,059	Capacity: 3,100
Gorica	2020–21 Slovenian PrvaLiga is located in Slovenia		Koper
Nova Gorica Sports Park	2020–21 Slovenian PrvaLiga is located in Slovenia		Bonifika Stadium
Capacity: 3,100	2020–21 Slovenian PrvaLiga is located in Slovenia		Capacity: 4,047
Maribor	Mura	Olimpija Ljubljana	Tabor Sežana
Ljudski vrt	Fazanerija City Stadium	Stožice Stadium	Rajko Štolfa Stadium
Capacity: 11,671	Capacity: 4,506	Capacity: 16,038	Capacity: 1,310

=== Personnel and kits ===
Team	Manager	Captain	Kit manufacturer	Shirt sponsor
Aluminij	(Slovenia) Oskar Drobne	(Slovenia) Luka Janžekovič	Zeus Sport	Talum, Zavarovalnica Sava
Bravo	(Slovenia) Dejan Grabić	(Nigeria) Ovbokha Agboyi	Joma	Nomago, Mastercard, Generali
Celje	(Slovenia) Agron Šalja	(Slovenia) Dušan Stojinović	Nike	Cinkarna, Droga
Domžale	(Slovenia) Dejan Djuranović	(Bosnia and Herzegovina) Senijad Ibričić	Joma	Esad Mulalić s.p.
Gorica	(Serbia) Aleksandar Jović	(Slovenia) Rok Grudina	Erreà	Hit, E 3
Koper	(Slovenia) Nedžad Okčić	(Slovenia) Ivica Guberac	Macron	Port of Koper
Maribor	(Slovenia) Simon Rožman	(Brazil) Marcos Tavares	Adidas	Zavarovalnica Sava, Nova KBM, Radio City
Mura	(Slovenia) Ante Šimundža	(Slovenia) Alen Kozar	Adidas	Generali
Olimpija Ljubljana	(Slovenia) Goran Stanković	(Slovenia) Timi Max Elšnik	Nike	Merkur zavarovalnica
Tabor Sežana	(Slovenia) Sabit Šljivo	(Slovenia) Marko Krivičić	Erreà	CherryBox24

=== Managerial changes ===
Team	Outgoing manager	Date of vacancy	Position in table	Incoming manager	Date of appointment
Maribor	(Bosnia and Herzegovina) Sergej Jakirović	29 August 2020	1st	(Italy) Mauro Camoranesi	3 September 2020
Tabor Sežana	(Italy) Mauro Camoranesi	3 September 2020	5th	(Slovenia) Goran Stanković	8 September 2020
Gorica	(Bosnia and Herzegovina) Borivoje Lučić	15 September 2020	10th	(Serbia) Gordan Petrić	18 September 2020
Aluminij	(Austria) Slobodan Grubor	7 December 2020	9th	(Slovenia) Oskar Drobne	7 December 2020
Gorica	(Serbia) Gordan Petrić	14 December 2020	10th	(Serbia) Aleksandar Jović	14 December 2020
Celje	(Slovenia) Dušan Kosič	21 December 2020	7th	(Czech Republic) Jiří Jarošík	25 December 2020
Olimpija Ljubljana	(Croatia) Dino Skender	8 January 2021	2nd	(Slovenia) Goran Stanković	11 January 2021
Tabor Sežana	(Slovenia) Goran Stanković	11 January 2021	6th	(Slovenia) Igor Božič	14 January 2021
Koper	(Slovenia) Miran Srebrnič	15 February 2021	4th	(Italy) Rodolfo Vanoli	17 February 2021
Maribor	(Italy) Mauro Camoranesi	23 February 2021	2nd	(Slovenia) Simon Rožman	20 March 2021
Tabor Sežana	(Slovenia) Igor Božič	12 April 2021	7th	(Slovenia) Sabit Šljivo	12 April 2021
Celje	(Czech Republic) Jiří Jarošík	26 April 2021	9th	(Slovenia) Agron Šalja	26 April 2021
Koper	(Italy) Rodolfo Vanoli	19 May 2021	8th	(Slovenia) Nedžad Okčić	19 May 2021

== League table ==
Pos	Team	Pld	W	D	L	GF	GA	GD	Pts	Qualification or relegation
1	Mura (C)	36	17	12	7	50	26	+24	63 (Note: Head to head points: Mura 7, Maribor 4)	Qualification for the Champions League first qualifying round
2	Maribor	36	17	12	7	64	41	+23	63	Qualification for the Europa Conference League first qualifying round
3	Olimpija Ljubljana (Note: Olimpija Ljubljana qualified for the Europa Conference League second qualifying round by winning the 2020–21 Slovenian Football Cup.)	36	16	11	9	45	35	+10	59	Qualification for the Europa Conference League second qualifying round
4	Domžale	36	14	13	9	52	41	+11	55	Qualification for the Europa Conference League first qualifying round
5	Bravo	36	10	15	11	39	39	0	45	
6	Tabor Sežana	36	12	8	16	40	44	−4	44	
7	Celje	36	12	7	17	36	41	−5	43	
8	Aluminij	36	10	13	13	31	41	−10	43	
9	Koper (O)	36	11	9	16	41	56	−15	42	Qualification for the relegation play-offs
10	Gorica (R)	36	7	8	21	24	58	−34	29	Relegation to Slovenian Second League

Source: Soccerway
Rules for classification: 1) Points; 2) Head-to-head points; 3) Head-to-head goal difference; 4) Head-to-head goals scored; 5) Goal difference; 6) Goals scored
(C) Champions; (O) Play-off winners; (R) Relegated

== Results ==
=== First half of the season ===
Home \ Away	ALU	BRA	CEL	DOM	GOR	KOP	MAR	MUR	OLI	TAB
Aluminij		1–1	0–0	1–2	2–1	1–1	1–3	1–2	1–0	0–0
Bravo	1–1		2–1	1–0	4–1	0–0	1–2	2–1	0–0	3–1
Celje	4–0	2–0		1–2	1–1	2–0	0–2	0–2	1–1	2–1
Domžale	2–1	1–2	0–1		1–1	1–1	1–1	1–1	3–1	3–1
Gorica	2–0	0–0	0–2	0–2		2–4	0–4	0–1	0–2	2–1
Koper	1–0	2–1	3–0	2–0	1–1		1–2	1–3	1–1	2–1
Maribor	3–0	4–1	2–2	4–3	3–1	1–1		2–1	1–1	1–0
Mura	1–2	0–0	0–0	1–1	1–0	2–1	2–0		0–1	3–0
Olimpija	3–0	2–0	1–0	3–2	1–0	1–2	2–0	0–0		2–1
Tabor	3–1	2–0	1–0	1–1	1–0	1–0	3–1	0–0	2–1	

Source: PrvaLiga
Legend: Blue = home team win; Yellow = draw; Red = away team win.

=== Second half of the season ===
Home \ Away	ALU	BRA	CEL	DOM	GOR	KOP	MAR	MUR	OLI	TAB
Aluminij		3–0	1–0	1–0	2–0	0–1	0–0	0–0	0–0	0–2
Bravo	0–1		2–0	2–2	0–0	3–0	0–1	0–1	3–0	1–1
Celje	0–1	2–3		0–2	0–1	2–1	2–1	1–3	4–0	0–3
Domžale	1–1	0–0	3–1		1–0	3–1	3–3	1–1	2–0	2–1
Gorica	0–0	3–2	0–2	2–1		2–1	1–1	1–5	0–1	0–3
Koper	0–3	0–0	1–1	0–2	0–0		0–3	1–0	1–2	1–0
Maribor	2–2	1–1	0–1	1–3	3–0	4–2		1–3	1–1	2–1
Mura	2–0	2–2	0–0	3–0	3–1	2–1	0–0		3–0	0–0
Olimpija	2–2	1–1	1–0	0–0	2–0	6–2	0–0	2–0		1–2
Tabor	1–1	0–0	0–1	0–0	0–1	3–4	0–4	3–1	0–3	

Source: PrvaLiga
Legend: Blue = home team win; Yellow = draw; Red = away team win.

== PrvaLiga play-off ==
A two-legged play-off between the ninth-placed team from the PrvaLiga and the second-placed team from the 2020–21 Slovenian Second League was played. The winner earned a place in the 2021–22 PrvaLiga season.

30 May 2021
17:00 CEST

Krka	0–2	Koper
	Report	Mulahusejnović 65' (pen.); Stevanović 67'

Portoval, Novo Mesto
Attendance: 300
Referee: Nejc Kajtazović
2 June 2021
20:00 CEST

Koper	2–3	Krka
Juffo 74'; Jelić Balta 84'	Report	Dušak 27', 44'; Parris 62'

Bonifika Stadium, Koper
Attendance: 500
Referee: Asmir Sagrković

Koper won 4–3 on aggregate.

== Top scorers ==
Rank	Player	Club	Goals
1	(Slovenia) Jan Mlakar	Maribor	14
1	(Bosnia and Herzegovina) Nardin Mulahusejnović	Koper	14
3	(Slovenia) Dario Kolobarić	Domžale	12
4	(Croatia) Luka Bobičanec	Mura	11
4	(Serbia) Đorđe Ivanović	Olimpija Ljubljana	11
4	(Slovenia) Andrés Vombergar	Olimpija Ljubljana	11
7	(Croatia) Filip Dangubić	Celje	10
7	(Slovenia) Milan Tučić	Bravo	10
9	(Greece) Christos Rovas	Tabor Sežana	9
10	(Austria) Arnel Jakupović	Domžale	7
10	(Slovenia) Rok Kronaveter	Maribor	7
10	(Slovenia) Aljoša Matko	Maribor	7
10	(Slovenia) Mustafa Nukić	Bravo	7
10	(Slovenia) Rudi Požeg Vancaš	Maribor	7
10	(Slovenia) Dare Vršič	Koper	7

== See also ==
- 2020–21 Slovenian Football Cup
- 2020–21 Slovenian Second League

== Notes ==
^a Many matches were played either behind closed doors or with significantly reduced capacity due to the COVID-19 pandemic in Slovenia.
