= Slovenia national under-19 football team =

National football team of Slovenia

Slovenia Under-19
- Association: Football Association of Slovenia
- Confederation: UEFA (Europe)
- Head coach: Muamer Vugdalić
- FIFA code: SVN
First colours	Second colours

Biggest win
- Slovenia 7–0 Andorra (Bakovci, Slovenia; 15 October 2013); Estonia 0–7 Slovenia (Sandviken, Sweden; 19 November 2019)

Biggest defeat
- Slovenia 1–7 England (Donetsk, Ukraine; 27 July 2009)

European Championship
- Appearances: 1 (first in 2009)
- Best result: Group stage (2009)

The Slovenia national under-19 football team is the national under-19 football team of Slovenia, governed by the Football Association of Slovenia.

== Players ==
=== Past squads ===
- 2009 UEFA European Under-19 Football Championship squad

== See also ==
- Slovenia national football team
- Slovenia national under-21 football team
