= NŠ Mura =

Slovenian football club

Coordinates: 46°40′6.81″N 16°9′27.57″E

Mura
- Full name: Nogometna šola Mura
- Nicknames: Čarno-bejli or Črno-beli (The Black and Whites)
- Founded: 2012; 14 years ago
- Ground: Fazanerija
- Capacity: 4,506
- President: Robert Kuzmič
- Head coach: Vacant
- League: Slovenian PrvaLiga
- 2025–26: Slovenian PrvaLiga, 8th of 10
- Website: www.nsmura.si
Home colours	Away colours

Nogometna šola Mura (English: Mura Football School), commonly referred to as NŠ Mura or simply Mura, is a Slovenian professional football club from Murska Sobota. Founded in 2012, the team currently plays in the Slovenian PrvaLiga, the top tier of Slovenian football. The club's home ground is Fazanerija City Stadium with a capacity of 4,506 seats.

The club started competing in the fourth tier of Slovenian football in 2013, and was promoted to the top flight by 2018. In 2020, Mura won its first major trophy after winning the Slovenian national cup. A year later, they became the champions of the Slovenian top division. Nicknamed the "Black and Whites" (Prekmurje Slovene: Čarno-bejli), they play their home games in black-and-white striped kits.

== History ==
After the 2012–13 season, the old ND Mura 05 experienced financial difficulties and was dissolved. The newly established club used its youth club to register a team for the 2013–14 season under the name NŠ Mura. Their first season of play was in 1. MNL Murska Sobota (fourth tier), where they finished second and earned promotion to the Slovenian Third League. In 2016–17 and 2017–18, Mura earned consecutive promotions to reach the top flight of Slovenian football for the first time. In 2018–19, the club finished fourth in the PrvaLiga and qualified for the UEFA Europa League, their first European competition. The club won its first major honour in 2020, defeating second division side Nafta 1903 in the final of the Slovenian Football Cup on 24 June.

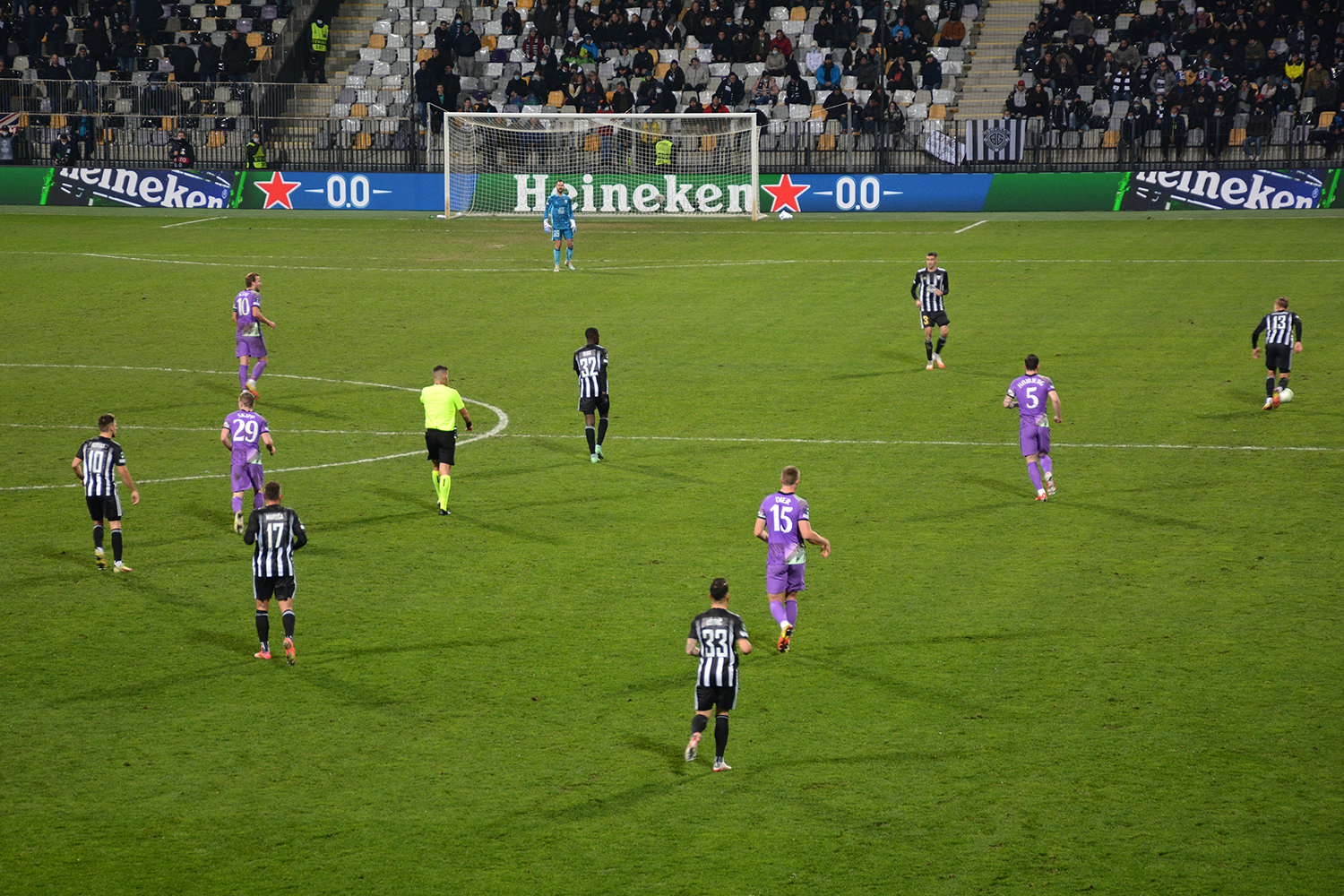
Match between Mura and Tottenham Hotspur in 2021

In 2020–21, Mura won its first Slovenian national league title after beating Maribor 3–1 in the final round of the season and finished with the same number of points as Maribor, but with a better head-to-head record.

On 26 August 2021, Mura made history by qualifying for their first ever group stage of European club competition. They played against Sturm Graz in the play-off round of the UEFA Europa League, and lost 5–1 on aggregate. As a result, they dropped into UEFA Europa Conference League, becoming only the second ever Slovenian side, after Maribor, to play in a group stage of European competition. Subsequently, Mura was drawn into a group with Vitesse, Rennes and Tottenham Hotspur. After losing the first four games in the group, Mura caused an upset by beating Tottenham 2–1 at home with a last-minute goal from Amadej Maroša. The result was labelled by the English press as one of the most humiliating defeats in Tottenham's entire history, given that they had played in the UEFA Champions League final as recently as 2019. Mura finished the competition in fourth place, with five defeats in six games.

== Stadium ==
Mura play their home matches at Fazanerija City Stadium in Murska Sobota. The stadium was originally built in 1936 and has been expanded and renovated several times since then. It currently has a capacity of 4,506 covered seats. With the standing area included, the total capacity of the stadium is around 4,700.

== Players ==
=== Current squad ===
As of 31 July 2026

Note: Flags indicate national team as defined under FIFA eligibility rules; some limited exceptions apply. Players may hold more than one non-FIFA nationality.

No.	Pos.	Nation	Player
2	DF	TOG	Faad Sana
3	DF	SLO	Aleksandar Zeljković
4	DF	SLO	Žan Flis
5	MF	CRO	Ivan Jelić Balta
6	MF	SLO	Florjan Jevšenak (on loan from Celje)
7	FW	SLO	Niko Kasalo
8	MF	CRO	Luka Bobičanec
9	FW	CRO	Marko Aščić (on loan from Rijeka)
10	MF	SLO	Nino Kouter (captain)
14	MF	SLO	Alen Kozar
15	MF	SLO	Anej Roman Leljak
17	DF	SLO	Kristjan Trdin
18	MF	SLO	Aljaž Zalaznik
20	DF	SLO	Samo Sečkar
21	DF	SLO	Žan Petrovič

No.	Pos.	Nation	Player
22	DF	SLO	Nejc Ajhmajer
23	MF	SLO	Jan Kovačič
24	DF	CRO	Lovro Kitin (on loan from Rijeka)
26	DF	CRO	Borna Proleta
27	DF	SLO	Mai Kolbl
30	FW	SLO	Kenan Kurtović (on loan from Kasımpaşa)
33	GK	SLO	Žiga Fermišek
34	MF	SLO	Amadej Filipčič
47	FW	CRO	Šimun Butić (on loan from Rijeka)
49	MF	CRO	Petar Pfeifer
77	MF	SLO	Luka Turudija
81	GK	SLO	Nejc Antonič
88	MF	SLO	Alen Korošec
89	MF	SLO	Val Bislimaj
99	FW	SLO	Robert Čakš

== Honours ==
=== League ===
- Slovenian PrvaLiga
  - Winners: 2020–21
- Slovenian Second League
  - Winners: 2017–18
- Slovenian Third League
  - Runners-up: 2015–16, 2016–17
- 1. MNL (fourth tier)
  - Runners-up: 2013–14

=== Cup ===
- Slovenian Cup
  - Winners: 2019–20
- MNZ Murska Sobota Cup
  - Winners: 2016–17, 2017–18

== League history ==
Season	League	Position	Record	Cup
2013–14	1. MNL (level 4)	2nd	15–7–4	did not qualify
2014–15	3. SNL – East	4th	15–3–8	did not qualify
2015–16	3. SNL – East	2nd	18–3–5	Round of 16
2016–17	3. SNL – East	2nd	20–3–3	did not qualify
2017–18	2. SNL	1st	23–3–4	Quarter-finals
2018–19	1. SNL	4th	13–13–10	Semi-finals
2019–20	1. SNL	4th	14–14–8	Winners
2020–21	1. SNL	1st	17–12–7	Round of 16
2021–22	1. SNL	4th	15–12–9	Quarter-finals
2022–23	1. SNL	5th	13–13–10	Round of 32
2023–24	1. SNL	6th	11–10–15	Semi-finals
2024–25	1. SNL	7th	9–8–19	Round of 16
2025–26	1. SNL	8th	8–7–19	Round of 16

== European record ==
Summary

Competition	Record					
Competition	G	W	D	L	GF	GA
UEFA Champions League	4	2	1	1	7	3
UEFA Europa League	9	3	1	5	12	15
UEFA Conference League	10	3	2	5	10	17
Total	23	8	4	11	29	35

Matches

All results (home and away) list Mura's goal tally first.

Season	Competition	Round	Club	Home	Away	Agg.
2019–20	UEFA Europa League	First qualifying round	(Israel) Maccabi Haifa	2–3	0–2	2–5
2020–21 (Note: Only one match per qualifying round was played due to the COVID-19 pandemic.)	UEFA Europa League	First qualifying round	(Estonia) Nõmme Kalju	—N/a	4–0 (Note: Played at Szusza Ferenc Stadion in Budapest (Hungary) due to travel restrictions related to the COVID-19 pandemic.)	—N/a
2020–21	UEFA Europa League	Second qualifying round	(Denmark) AGF	3–0	—N/a	
2020–21	UEFA Europa League	Third qualifying round	(Netherlands) PSV Eindhoven	1–5	—N/a	
2021–22	UEFA Champions League	First qualifying round	(North Macedonia) Shkëndija	5–0	1–0	6–0
2021–22	UEFA Champions League	Second qualifying round	(Bulgaria) Ludogorets Razgrad	0–0	1–3	1–3
2021–22	UEFA Europa League	Third qualifying round	(Lithuania) Žalgiris	0–0	1–0	1–0
2021–22	UEFA Europa League	Play-off round	(Austria) Sturm Graz	1–3	0–2	1–5
2021–22	UEFA Europa Conference League	Group G	(Netherlands) Vitesse	0–2	1–3	—N/a
2021–22	UEFA Europa Conference League	Group G	(England) Tottenham Hotspur	2–1	1–5	—N/a
2021–22	UEFA Europa Conference League	Group G	(France) Rennes	1–2	0–1	—N/a
2022–23	UEFA Europa Conference League	First qualifying round	(Moldova) Sfîntul Gheorghe	2–1	2–1	4–2
2022–23	UEFA Europa Conference League	Second qualifying round	(Republic of Ireland) St Patrick's Athletic	0–0 (Note: After extra time.)	1–1	1–1 (Note: Lost 5–6 on penalties.)
