= Žiga =

- Pronunciation: Slovene: [ʒíːɡa]
- Gender: Male
- Language: Slovenia

Other names
- Related names: Sigmund, Zygmunt

Žiga is a Slovenian given name. It is the Slovenian form of Sigmund.

== Notable people with the name ==
- Žiga Dimec (born 1993), Slovenian basketball player
- Žiga Donik (born 1995), Slovenian volleyball player
- Žiga Frelih (born 1998), Slovenian footballer
- Žiga Hirschler (1894–1941), Croatian composer
- Žiga Lin Hočevar (born 2007), Slovenian slalom canoeist
- Žiga Jeglič (born 1988), Slovenian ice hockey player
- Žiga Jelar (born 1997), Slovenian ski jumper
- Žiga Jerman (born 1998), Slovenian racing cyclist
- Žiga Kariž (born 1973), Slovenian painter
- Žiga Kastrevec (born 1994), Slovenian footballer
- Žiga Kous (born 1992), Slovenian footballer
- Žiga Laci (born 2002), Slovenian footballer
- Žiga Lipušček (born 1997), Slovenian footballer
- Žiga Mlakar (born 1990), Slovenian handball player
- Žiga Pance (born 1989), Slovenian ice hockey player
- Žiga Pavlin (born 1985), Slovenian ice hockey player
- Žiga Pešut (born 1992), Slovenian ice hockey player
- Žiga Ravnikar (born 1999), Slovenian archer
- Žiga Repas (born 2001), Slovenian footballer
- Žiga Samar (born 2001), Slovenian basketball player
- Žiga Smrtnik (born 1994), Slovenian footballer
- Žiga Svete (born 1985), Slovenian ice hockey player
- Žiga Zatežič (born 1995), Slovenian basketball player
- Žiga Škoflek (born 1994), Slovenian footballer
- Žiga Štern (born 1994), Slovenian volleyball player
- Žiga Živko (born 1995), Slovenian footballer

== See also ==
- Ivan Žiga (born 1972), Slovak footballer
- Peter Žiga (born 1972), Slovak politician and businessman
- Ziga (disambiguation)
- Žika, given name
