= Žika =

Žika is a Slavic masculine given name, a nickname derived from South Slavic given names beginning with Živ-, such as Živorad, Živojin or Života. Notable people with the name include:

- Žika Bujuklić (born 1952), Serbian academic and politician
- Žika Gojković (born 1972), Serbian politician
- Žika Jelić (born 1942), Serbian rock musician
- Žika Mitrović (1921–2005), Serbian film director and screenwriter
- Žika Petrović (1939–2000), Serbian engineer and business executive
- Žika Rafajlović (1871–1953), Serbian politician
- Žika Todorović (born 1965), Serbian actor and musician
- Živojin Milovanović (1884–1905), soldier and member of the Serbian Chetnik Organization
- Živojin Pavlović (1933–1998), Serbian film director and writer
- Živojin Tamburić (born 1957), Serbian comics critic, editor, and publisher
- Vuča Žikić (died 1808), builder of the Deligrad fortification in the First Serbian Uprising, named Captain Žika

== See also ==
- Zika (disambiguation)
- Žiga, Slovenian given name
