= Žižka =

Žižka (feminine: Žižková) is a Czech surname. The oldest documents of the surname are from 1367 (written as Žužka) and from 1376. The origin of the surname is unclear and there are several theories about its origin. It could be derived from the given name Zikmund, from the Czech word šiška, (Note: With different meanings: 'conifer cone'; something oval-shaped/irregular-shaped (resembling a conifer cone); food made from dough in this shape; 'human head' (expresivelly).) or from the nickname Žužka with an unclear meaning. Notable people with the surname include:

- Blanka Zizka (born 1955), Czech-American theatre director and playwright
- Daniel Žižka (born 2002), Czech singer-songwriter
- Jan Žižka (1360–1424), Czech military leader
- Ladislav Žižka (born 1945), Czech biathlete
- Peter Zizka (born 1961), German designer and conceptual artist
- Tomáš Žižka (born 1979), Czech ice hockey player
