= Života =

- Gender: masculine

Origin
- Origin: Slavic
- Region of origin: Serbia

Other names
- Related names: Živorad, Živojin

Života (Serbian Cyrillic: Живота) is a Serbian masculine given name of Slavic origin. It is derived from the Slavic word živ, meaning "alive, living, vivacious".

Notable people with the name include:

- Života Ðurić (1963–1999), Yugoslav fighter pilot
- Života Panić (1933–2003), Yugoslav military officer
- Života Starčević (born 1968) is a Serbian politician
