= Zika (surname) =

Zika (feminine: Ziková) and Zíka (feminine: Zíková) is a Czech surname, a pet form of Zikmund. Zika also appears in other languages. Notable people with the surname include:

- Adolf Zika (born 1972), Czech photographer
- Anna Zíková (born 1998), Czech ice hockey player
- Ardian Zika (born 1980), American businessman and politician
- Damouré Zika (1923–2009), Nigerian traditional healer, broadcaster and film actor
- Jack Zika (born 1977), American politician
- Jenny Zika (born 1984), Austrian tennis player
- Zdeněk Zika (1950–2014), Czech rower

== See also ==
- Zika (disambiguation)
