= Zika (disambiguation) =

Zika, or Zika fever, is an illness caused by the Zika virus.

Zika or Žika may also refer to:

- Zika virus, a member of the Flaviviridae virus family
- Zika Forest, a forest in Uganda
- Zika rabbit, a breed of rabbit

== People ==
- Zika (surname), list of people with the surname
- Žika, list of people with the name
- Zika Ascher (1910–1992), Czech artist and designer

== See also ==
- Foolish Years, a Yugoslav movie series known informally as Žika's Dynasty
- Zika virus outbreak, a list of outbreaks
  - 2015–16 Zika virus epidemic
- Zica (disambiguation)
