= Zica =

Zica may refer to:

- Žiča, an early 13th-century Serb Orthodox monastery near Kraljevo, Serbia
- Zica family, a historic Brazilian family, originating in Minas Gerais in the late 18th century
- Zica, Africa, Ancient city and former bishopric in Roman Africa, probably in present Tunisian city of Zaghouan; now a Latin Catholic titular bishopric

== See also ==
- Zika (disambiguation)
