= Zikmund =

Zikmund (feminine: Zikmundová) is a Czech given name and surname, a Czech variant of the name Sigismund. Pet forms of the name are Zika and Zíka. Notable people with the name include:

== Given name ==
- Zikmund Huler (?–1405), Bohemian sub-chamberlain
- Zikmund of Pernštejn (c. 1437 – c. 1470s), Moravian nobleman
- Zikmund Schul (1916–1944), German composer
- Zikmund Winter (1846–1912), Czech writer and historian

== Surname ==
- Allen H. Zikmund (1922–2018), American football player and coach
- Barbara Brown Zikmund (born 1939), American historian
- Larry Zikmund (born 1946), American politician
- Miroslav Zikmund (1919–2021), Czech travel writer and explorer

== See also ==
- Sigismund, Holy Roman Emperor (called Zikmund Lucemburský in Czech)
- 230648 Zikmund, minor planet named after Zikmund Lucemburský
