= Živojinović =

Živojinović (Serbian: Живојиновић) is a Serbian patronymic surname derived from a masculine given name Živojin. Notable people with the surname include:

- Aleksandar Živojinović (born 1953), better known as Alex Lifeson, Canadian musician
- Velimir Bata Živojinović (1933–2016), Serbian actor
- Branimir Živojinović (1930–2007), Serbian poet, son of Velimir
- Fahreta Živojinović (born 1960 as Fahreta Jahić), better known as Lepa Brena, Bosnian folk singer and wife of Slobodan Živojinović
- Slobodan Živojinović (born 1963), Serbian tennis player
- Velimir Živojinović Masuka (1886–1974), Serbian theater director
