= Živorad =

- Gender: male

Origin
- Origin: Slavic
- Region of origin: Serbia

Other names
- Related names: Živojin, Živko

Živorad (Serbian Cyrillic: Живорад) is a Serbian masculine given name of Slavic origin. It is derived from the Slavic elements živ ("alive, living") and rad ("happy, willing").

Nicknames for Živorad are Živko and Žika.

== Notable people with the name ==
- Živorad Janković (1924–1990), Bosnian architect
- Živorad Jelić (born 1942), Serbian rock musician
- Živorad Jevtić (1943–2000), Serbian footballer
- Živorad Jovanović (1914–1942), Yugoslav partisan
- Živorad Kovačević (1930–2011), Serbian diplomat and politician
- Živorad Milosavljević (born 1956), Serbian politician
- Živorad Mišić (born 1986), Serbian footballer
- Živorad Mitrović (1921–2005), Serbian film director and screenwriter
- Živorad Nastasijević (1893–1966), Serbian painter
- Živorad Nešić (born 1943), Serbian politician
- Živorad Petrović (1939–2000), Serbian engineer and business executive
- Živorad Smiljanić (1942–2018), Serbian politician
- Živorad Tomić (born 1951), Croatian film director
