= Meanings of minor-planet names: 230001–231000 =

As minor planet discoveries are confirmed, they are given a permanent number by the IAU's Minor Planet Center (MPC), and the discoverers can then submit names for them, following the IAU's naming conventions. The list below concerns those minor planets in the specified number-range that have received names, and explains the meanings of those names.

Official naming citations of newly named small Solar System bodies are approved and published in a bulletin by IAU's Working Group for Small Bodies Nomenclature (WGSBN). Before May 2021, citations were published in MPC's Minor Planet Circulars for many decades. Recent citations can also be found on the JPL Small-Body Database (SBDB). Until his death in 2016, German astronomer Lutz D. Schmadel compiled these citations into the Dictionary of Minor Planet Names (DMP) and regularly updated the collection.

Based on Paul Herget's The Names of the Minor Planets, Schmadel also researched the unclear origin of numerous asteroids, most of which had been named prior to World War II. This article incorporates text from this source, which is in the public domain: SBDB New namings may only be added to this list below after official publication as the preannouncement of names is condemned. The WGSBN publishes a comprehensive guideline for the naming rules of non-cometary small Solar System bodies.

== 230001–230100 ==
| Named minor planet | Provisional | This minor planet was named for... | Ref · Catalog |
|---|---|---|---|
There are no named minor planets in this number range

== 230101–230200 ==
back to top

| Named minor planet | Provisional | This minor planet was named for... | Ref · Catalog |
|---|---|---|---|
| 230151 Vachier | 2001 QZ_{72} | Frederic Vachier (born 1974), a celestial mechanician and observer at the IMCCE-Observatory in Paris. He has studied binary asteroids, both as an observer and as a theorist for orbit determinations. | JPL · 230151 |
| 230155 Francksallet | 2001 QC_{111} | Franck Sallet (born 1970), a French amateur astronomer | JPL · 230155 |

== 230201–230300 ==
back to top

| Named minor planet | Provisional | This minor planet was named for... | Ref · Catalog |
|---|---|---|---|
There are no named minor planets in this number range

== 230301–230400 ==
back to top

| Named minor planet | Provisional | This minor planet was named for... | Ref · Catalog |
|---|---|---|---|
There are no named minor planets in this number range

== 230401–230500 ==
back to top

| Named minor planet | Provisional | This minor planet was named for... | Ref · Catalog |
|---|---|---|---|
| 230415 Matthiasjung | 2002 MQ_{5} | Matthias Jung (born 1961), a German amateur astronomer | JPL · 230415 |
| 230434 Johnhanley | 2002 PV_{147} | John J. Hanley (born 1963), American electrical engineer who provided key support during New Horizons. | JPL · 230434 |

== 230501–230600 ==
back to top

| Named minor planet | Provisional | This minor planet was named for... | Ref · Catalog |
|---|---|---|---|
There are no named minor planets in this number range

== 230601–230700 ==
back to top

| Named minor planet | Provisional | This minor planet was named for... | Ref · Catalog |
|---|---|---|---|
| 230631 Justino | 2003 MB | Justino Sota Martinez (1931–2017) was the father of the discoverer. He was a Catholic priest in Atauta between 1954 and 1964. Then he got a bachelor's degree in literature, and become a secondary school teacher in Villaca\~{n}as and Tres Cantos. With his wife Carmen Ballano, he had two children (Fernando and Alfredo). | JPL · 230631 |
| 230648 Zikmund | 2003 SL_{15} | Sigismund of Luxembourg or Zikmund Lucemburský (1368–1437), Holy Roman Emperor, King of Hungary, Croatia, Germany, Italy, and Bohemia | JPL · 230648 |
| 230656 Kovácspál | 2003 SX_{111} | Pál Kovács (1912–1995), a Hungarian Olympic fencer and sports leader | JPL · 230656 |
| 230667 Janmlynář | 2003 SZ_{200} | Czech physicist Jan Mlynář (1966–2023). | IAU · 230667 |
| 230691 Van Vogt | 2003 UD_{18} | Alfred Elton van Vogt (1912–2000), a Canadian-born science-fiction writer | JPL · 230691 |

== 230701–230800 ==
back to top

| Named minor planet | Provisional | This minor planet was named for... | Ref · Catalog |
|---|---|---|---|
| 230728 Tedstryk | 2003 UE_{316} | Theodore Stryk (born 1979), American philosopher planetary-image expert at Roane State Community College. | JPL · 230728 |
| 230736 Jalyhome | 2003 WV_{2} | Jalyhome, a school/orphanage for lepers in Pondicherry, India | JPL · 230736 |
| 230759 Anishahosadurga | 2003 WE_{183} | Anisha Hosadurga (born 1997), American New Horizons real-time flight controller and mission operations analyst. | JPL · 230759 |
| 230765 Alfbester | 2003 XN_{15} | Alfred Bester (1913–1987), an American science-fiction writer | JPL · 230765 |

== 230801–230900 ==
back to top

| Named minor planet | Provisional | This minor planet was named for... | Ref · Catalog |
|---|---|---|---|
There are no named minor planets in this number range

== 230901–231000 ==
back to top

| Named minor planet | Provisional | This minor planet was named for... | Ref · Catalog |
|---|---|---|---|
| 230975 Rogerfederer | 2005 AQ_{25} | Roger Federer (born 1981), a Swiss tennis player | JPL · 230975 |

back to top

| Preceded by 229,001–230,000 | Meanings of minor-planet names List of minor planets: 230,001–231,000 | Succeeded by 231,001–232,000 |
