= Ziga =

Ziga may refer to:

== People ==
- David Kwaku Ziga (born 1922), Ghanaian politician and potter
- Patricia Foufoué Ziga (born 1972), Côte d'Ivoire sprinter
- Tecla San Andres Ziga (1906–1992), Filipino politician
- Victor Ziga, Filipino politician

== Places ==
- Ziga Department, Sanmatenga Province, Burkina Faso
  - Ziga, Burkina Faso
- Ziga, Navarre, Spain

== Other ==
- Žiga, a Slovene male given name
- Z (military symbol), a military symbol painted on Russian tanks during the 2022 invasion of Ukraine
