= Žiga Smrtnik =

Slovenian footballer

Personal information
- Date of birth: 1 February 1994 (age 32)
- Place of birth: Ljubljana, Slovenia
- Position: Forward

Team information
- Current team: Gemonese

Youth career
- –2011: Interblock
- 2011–2012: Koper

Senior career*
Years	Team	Apps	(Gls)
2012–2015	Koper	17	(0)
2013–2014	→ Jadran Dekani (loan)	24	(15)
2014	→ Radomlje (loan)	15	(0)
2014	→ Radomlje B	3	(1)
2015–2017	Kras Repen	53	(34)
2017–2019	Cjarlins Muzane	64	(21)
2019	Tamai	16	(2)
2020	Chions	6	(0)
2020–2021	Brian Lignano		
2021–2022	Kras Repen	14	(5)
2022–	Gemonese		

International career
2010	Slovenia U17 (Note: Official competitive matches only.)	3	(0)
2012	Slovenia U19	2	(0)
- * Club domestic league appearances and goals as of 15 February 2023

Žiga Smrtnik (born 1 February 1994) is a Slovenian footballer who plays for Italian Promozione side Gemonese.

== Career ==
On 6 June 2019, Italian Serie D club Tamai confirmed that Smrtnik had joined the club. He played for Tamai until the end of 2019, before moving to fellow league club Chions.
