= Žiga Zatežič =

Slovenian basketball player

Southeastern Oklahoma Savage Storm
- Position: Shooting guard

Personal information
- Born: December 20, 1995 (age 30) Novo Mesto, Slovenia
- Listed height: 1.96 m (6 ft 5 in)
- Listed weight: 86 kg (190 lb)

Career information
- College: Southeastern Oklahoma State (2016–2020)
- Playing career: 2012–2020

Career history
- 2012–2015: Krka-Telekom
- 2012–2014: → Krka mladi

Žiga Zatežič (born 20 December 1995) is a Slovenian retired professional basketball player who played professional for Krka-Telekom of the Telemach League and college Southeastern Oklahoma State.
