= Živojin =

- Pronunciation: Serbian pronunciation: [ʒîʋojin]
- Gender: male

Origin
- Origin: Slavic
- Region of origin: Serbia

Other names
- Related names: Živorad, Živko

Živojin (Serbian Cyrillic: Живојин) is a Serbian masculine given name of Slavic origin. It is derived from the Slavic element živ, meaning "alive, living".

== Notable people with the name ==
- Živojin Bumbaširević (1920–2008), Serbian orthopaedic surgeon and traumatologist
- Živojin Jocić (1870–1914), Serbian chemist
- Živojin Juškić (born 1969), Serbian footballer
- Živojin Lazić (1876–1958), Serbian politician
- Živojin Lukić (1889–1934), Serbian sculptor
- Živojin Milenković (1928–2008), Serbian actor
- Živojin Milovanović (1884–1905), Serbian soldier
- Živojin Mišić (1855–1921), Serbian military commander
- Živojin Pavlović (1933–1998), Serbian film director and writer
- Živojin Rafajlović (1871–1953), Serbian politician
- Živojin Rakočević (born 1973), Serbian journalist, writer and poet
- Zivojin Stjepić (born 1967), Serbian politician
- Živojin Tamburić (born 1957), Serbian comics critic, historian, editor and publisher
- Živojin Zdravković (1914–2001), Serbian conductor

== See also ==
- Živojinović
