= List of minor planets: 230001–231000 =

The following is a partial list of minor planets, running from minor-planet number 230001 through 231000, inclusive. The primary data for this and other partial lists is based on JPL's "Small-Body Orbital Elements" and data available from the Minor Planet Center. Critical list information is also provided by the MPC, unless otherwise specified from Lowell Observatory. A detailed description of the table's columns and additional sources are given on the main page including a complete list of every page in this series, and a statistical break-up on the dynamical classification of minor planets.

Also see the summary list of all named bodies in numerical and alphabetical order, and the corresponding naming citations for the number range of this particular list. New namings may only be added to this list after official publication, as the preannouncement of names is condemned by the Working Group for Small Bodies Nomenclature of the International Astronomical Union.

Near-Earth obj.	MBA (inner)	MBA (outer)	Centaur
Mars-crosser	MBA (middle)	Jupiter trojan	Trans-Neptunian obj.
Unclassified

== 230001–230100 ==
Designation			Discovery			Properties		Ref
Permanent	Provisional	Named after	Date	Site	Discoverer(s)	Category	Diam.	Ref
230001	2000 DP_{58}	—	February 29, 2000	Socorro	LINEAR	·	2.1 km	MPC · JPL
230002	2000 DU_{59}	—	February 29, 2000	Socorro	LINEAR	·	1.2 km	MPC · JPL
230003	2000 DL_{71}	—	February 29, 2000	Socorro	LINEAR	THB	4.3 km	MPC · JPL
230004	2000 DC_{99}	—	February 29, 2000	Socorro	LINEAR	·	1.3 km	MPC · JPL
230005	2000 DH_{99}	—	February 29, 2000	Socorro	LINEAR	V	1.1 km	MPC · JPL
230006	2000 DO_{104}	—	February 29, 2000	Socorro	LINEAR	·	4.7 km	MPC · JPL
230007	2000 EO_{30}	—	March 5, 2000	Socorro	LINEAR	·	1.3 km	MPC · JPL
230008	2000 EF_{92}	—	March 9, 2000	Socorro	LINEAR	·	5.6 km	MPC · JPL
230009	2000 EY_{101}	—	March 14, 2000	Kitt Peak	Spacewatch	·	3.0 km	MPC · JPL
230010	2000 FW_{23}	—	March 29, 2000	Socorro	LINEAR	·	1.8 km	MPC · JPL
230011	2000 FC_{48}	—	March 29, 2000	Socorro	LINEAR	·	1.6 km	MPC · JPL
230012	2000 FC_{66}	—	March 29, 2000	Socorro	LINEAR	NYS	1.9 km	MPC · JPL
230013	2000 GU_{44}	—	April 5, 2000	Socorro	LINEAR	NYS	1.2 km	MPC · JPL
230014	2000 GQ_{54}	—	April 5, 2000	Socorro	LINEAR	·	1.8 km	MPC · JPL
230015	2000 GB_{72}	—	April 5, 2000	Socorro	LINEAR	·	4.5 km	MPC · JPL
230016	2000 GP_{112}	—	April 4, 2000	Socorro	LINEAR	·	5.3 km	MPC · JPL
230017	2000 GE_{164}	—	April 13, 2000	Haleakala	NEAT	TIR	5.2 km	MPC · JPL
230018	2000 HO_{7}	—	April 27, 2000	Socorro	LINEAR	MAS	1.3 km	MPC · JPL
230019	2000 HE_{17}	—	April 24, 2000	Kitt Peak	Spacewatch	·	2.4 km	MPC · JPL
230020	2000 HM_{33}	—	April 30, 2000	Socorro	LINEAR	·	1.5 km	MPC · JPL
230021	2000 HS_{78}	—	April 28, 2000	Anderson Mesa	LONEOS	PHO	1.5 km	MPC · JPL
230022	2000 HW_{90}	—	April 25, 2000	Kitt Peak	Spacewatch	HYG	4.0 km	MPC · JPL
230023	2000 JW_{3}	—	May 4, 2000	Socorro	LINEAR	H	760 m	MPC · JPL
230024	2000 JK_{6}	—	May 3, 2000	Socorro	LINEAR	TIR	3.4 km	MPC · JPL
230025	2000 JB_{55}	—	May 6, 2000	Socorro	LINEAR	·	1.5 km	MPC · JPL
230026	2000 JJ_{69}	—	May 1, 2000	Anderson Mesa	LONEOS	·	2.8 km	MPC · JPL
230027	2000 KR_{64}	—	May 27, 2000	Socorro	LINEAR	·	1.7 km	MPC · JPL
230028	2000 KU_{66}	—	May 29, 2000	Anderson Mesa	LONEOS	H	750 m	MPC · JPL
230029	2000 KQ_{81}	—	May 25, 2000	Anderson Mesa	LONEOS	·	2.1 km	MPC · JPL
230030	2000 OO_{55}	—	July 29, 2000	Anderson Mesa	LONEOS	·	1.7 km	MPC · JPL
230031	2000 PG	—	August 1, 2000	Socorro	LINEAR	H	900 m	MPC · JPL
230032	2000 QP_{3}	—	August 24, 2000	Socorro	LINEAR	·	3.4 km	MPC · JPL
230033	2000 QK_{16}	—	August 24, 2000	Socorro	LINEAR	·	1.4 km	MPC · JPL
230034	2000 QV_{26}	—	August 24, 2000	Socorro	LINEAR	(5)	1.7 km	MPC · JPL
230035	2000 QJ_{34}	—	August 26, 2000	Socorro	LINEAR	·	2.8 km	MPC · JPL
230036	2000 QG_{78}	—	August 24, 2000	Socorro	LINEAR	·	2.4 km	MPC · JPL
230037	2000 QG_{85}	—	August 25, 2000	Socorro	LINEAR	·	3.4 km	MPC · JPL
230038	2000 QX_{129}	—	August 28, 2000	Socorro	LINEAR	·	3.2 km	MPC · JPL
230039	2000 QR_{156}	—	August 31, 2000	Socorro	LINEAR	MAR	1.7 km	MPC · JPL
230040	2000 QT_{162}	—	August 31, 2000	Socorro	LINEAR	·	1.9 km	MPC · JPL
230041	2000 QW_{165}	—	August 31, 2000	Socorro	LINEAR	·	2.3 km	MPC · JPL
230042	2000 QR_{212}	—	August 31, 2000	Socorro	LINEAR	(5)	1.3 km	MPC · JPL
230043	2000 QO_{249}	—	August 31, 2000	Socorro	LINEAR	·	3.0 km	MPC · JPL
230044	2000 RJ_{56}	—	September 6, 2000	Socorro	LINEAR	(5)	1.9 km	MPC · JPL
230045	2000 SZ_{19}	—	September 23, 2000	Socorro	LINEAR	·	1.9 km	MPC · JPL
230046	2000 SO_{30}	—	September 24, 2000	Socorro	LINEAR	·	2.9 km	MPC · JPL
230047	2000 SJ_{40}	—	September 24, 2000	Socorro	LINEAR	·	3.2 km	MPC · JPL
230048	2000 ST_{99}	—	September 23, 2000	Socorro	LINEAR	(5)	1.8 km	MPC · JPL
230049	2000 ST_{105}	—	September 24, 2000	Socorro	LINEAR	·	1.6 km	MPC · JPL
230050	2000 SU_{109}	—	September 24, 2000	Socorro	LINEAR	·	4.1 km	MPC · JPL
230051	2000 SZ_{114}	—	September 24, 2000	Socorro	LINEAR	·	2.1 km	MPC · JPL
230052	2000 SP_{129}	—	September 22, 2000	Socorro	LINEAR	MAR	1.9 km	MPC · JPL
230053	2000 SV_{133}	—	September 23, 2000	Socorro	LINEAR	·	2.2 km	MPC · JPL
230054	2000 SY_{148}	—	September 24, 2000	Socorro	LINEAR	(5)	1.5 km	MPC · JPL
230055	2000 SC_{149}	—	September 24, 2000	Socorro	LINEAR	·	2.5 km	MPC · JPL
230056	2000 SS_{182}	—	September 20, 2000	Kitt Peak	Spacewatch	·	1.9 km	MPC · JPL
230057	2000 SY_{182}	—	September 20, 2000	Kitt Peak	Spacewatch	·	1.4 km	MPC · JPL
230058	2000 SD_{193}	—	September 24, 2000	Socorro	LINEAR	·	2.6 km	MPC · JPL
230059	2000 SJ_{250}	—	September 24, 2000	Socorro	LINEAR	·	2.0 km	MPC · JPL
230060	2000 SO_{265}	—	September 26, 2000	Socorro	LINEAR	·	2.1 km	MPC · JPL
230061	2000 SH_{288}	—	September 26, 2000	Socorro	LINEAR	·	2.5 km	MPC · JPL
230062	2000 SM_{310}	—	September 26, 2000	Socorro	LINEAR	·	2.3 km	MPC · JPL
230063	2000 SH_{350}	—	September 29, 2000	Anderson Mesa	LONEOS	·	2.0 km	MPC · JPL
230064	2000 SN_{352}	—	September 30, 2000	Anderson Mesa	LONEOS	·	3.0 km	MPC · JPL
230065	2000 TM_{48}	—	October 1, 2000	Socorro	LINEAR	·	2.3 km	MPC · JPL
230066	2000 TR_{59}	—	October 2, 2000	Anderson Mesa	LONEOS	·	5.1 km	MPC · JPL
230067	2000 TG_{72}	—	October 1, 2000	Apache Point	SDSS	(5)	1.6 km	MPC · JPL
230068	2000 UM	—	October 30, 2000	Socorro	LINEAR	·	2.3 km	MPC · JPL
230069	2000 UC_{30}	—	October 29, 2000	Socorro	LINEAR	·	6.0 km	MPC · JPL
230070	2000 UX_{33}	—	October 31, 2000	Socorro	LINEAR	HNS	1.9 km	MPC · JPL
230071	2000 UH_{55}	—	October 24, 2000	Socorro	LINEAR	·	4.5 km	MPC · JPL
230072	2000 UD_{58}	—	October 25, 2000	Socorro	LINEAR	·	1.5 km	MPC · JPL
230073	2000 UG_{70}	—	October 25, 2000	Socorro	LINEAR	·	2.3 km	MPC · JPL
230074	2000 UE_{74}	—	October 29, 2000	Socorro	LINEAR	·	1.7 km	MPC · JPL
230075	2000 UQ_{103}	—	October 25, 2000	Socorro	LINEAR	JUN	1.3 km	MPC · JPL
230076	2000 UE_{111}	—	October 26, 2000	Kitt Peak	Spacewatch	·	1.8 km	MPC · JPL
230077	2000 VG_{7}	—	November 1, 2000	Socorro	LINEAR	(12739)	2.3 km	MPC · JPL
230078	2000 VE_{51}	—	November 3, 2000	Socorro	LINEAR	·	3.5 km	MPC · JPL
230079	2000 WW_{1}	—	November 17, 2000	Kitt Peak	Spacewatch	·	2.8 km	MPC · JPL
230080	2000 WE_{11}	—	November 20, 2000	Junk Bond	J. Medkeff	·	1.5 km	MPC · JPL
230081	2000 WP_{38}	—	November 20, 2000	Socorro	LINEAR	·	2.9 km	MPC · JPL
230082	2000 WO_{42}	—	November 21, 2000	Socorro	LINEAR	·	1.9 km	MPC · JPL
230083	2000 WT_{53}	—	November 27, 2000	Kitt Peak	Spacewatch	·	2.7 km	MPC · JPL
230084	2000 WG_{91}	—	November 21, 2000	Socorro	LINEAR	·	4.4 km	MPC · JPL
230085	2000 WX_{106}	—	November 20, 2000	Socorro	LINEAR	·	5.7 km	MPC · JPL
230086	2000 WR_{131}	—	November 20, 2000	Anderson Mesa	LONEOS	·	4.0 km	MPC · JPL
230087	2000 WT_{132}	—	November 19, 2000	Socorro	LINEAR	·	2.0 km	MPC · JPL
230088	2000 WJ_{140}	—	November 21, 2000	Socorro	LINEAR	(5)	3.7 km	MPC · JPL
230089	2000 WP_{148}	—	November 30, 2000	Socorro	LINEAR	APO	460 m	MPC · JPL
230090	2000 WA_{157}	—	November 30, 2000	Socorro	LINEAR	·	3.1 km	MPC · JPL
230091	2000 XH_{5}	—	December 1, 2000	Socorro	LINEAR	·	2.8 km	MPC · JPL
230092	2000 XD_{11}	—	December 1, 2000	Socorro	LINEAR	·	3.6 km	MPC · JPL
230093	2000 XG_{12}	—	December 4, 2000	Socorro	LINEAR	·	3.6 km	MPC · JPL
230094	2000 XX_{30}	—	December 4, 2000	Socorro	LINEAR	JUN	1.7 km	MPC · JPL
230095	2000 XJ_{41}	—	December 5, 2000	Socorro	LINEAR	·	3.0 km	MPC · JPL
230096	2000 XA_{46}	—	December 15, 2000	Socorro	LINEAR	BAR	1.7 km	MPC · JPL
230097	2000 YU_{13}	—	December 22, 2000	Kitt Peak	Spacewatch	·	2.8 km	MPC · JPL
230098	2000 YL_{41}	—	December 30, 2000	Socorro	LINEAR	WIT	1.9 km	MPC · JPL
230099	2000 YQ_{42}	—	December 30, 2000	Socorro	LINEAR	·	1.8 km	MPC · JPL
230100	2000 YF_{46}	—	December 30, 2000	Socorro	LINEAR	·	3.5 km	MPC · JPL

== 230101–230200 ==
back to top

Designation			Discovery			Properties		Ref
Permanent	Provisional	Named after	Date	Site	Discoverer(s)	Category	Diam.	Ref
230101	2000 YK_{58}	—	December 30, 2000	Socorro	LINEAR	·	2.5 km	MPC · JPL
230102	2000 YY_{73}	—	December 30, 2000	Socorro	LINEAR	·	3.8 km	MPC · JPL
230103	2000 YH_{122}	—	December 28, 2000	Socorro	LINEAR	·	2.5 km	MPC · JPL
230104	2000 YR_{135}	—	December 18, 2000	Anderson Mesa	LONEOS	·	2.5 km	MPC · JPL
230105	2000 YW_{143}	—	December 23, 2000	Apache Point	SDSS	·	3.0 km	MPC · JPL
230106	2001 AZ_{8}	—	January 2, 2001	Socorro	LINEAR	EUN	1.9 km	MPC · JPL
230107	2001 AH_{22}	—	January 3, 2001	Socorro	LINEAR	EUN	2.1 km	MPC · JPL
230108	2001 AB_{25}	—	January 4, 2001	Socorro	LINEAR	·	5.2 km	MPC · JPL
230109	2001 AL_{27}	—	January 5, 2001	Socorro	LINEAR	·	2.1 km	MPC · JPL
230110	2001 AL_{36}	—	January 5, 2001	Socorro	LINEAR	ADE	4.3 km	MPC · JPL
230111	2001 BE_{10}	—	January 18, 2001	Socorro	LINEAR	ATE · PHA	370 m	MPC · JPL
230112	2001 BX_{13}	—	January 18, 2001	Kitt Peak	Spacewatch	NEM	3.0 km	MPC · JPL
230113	2001 BZ_{62}	—	January 29, 2001	Socorro	LINEAR	·	2.4 km	MPC · JPL
230114	2001 BR_{71}	—	January 29, 2001	Socorro	LINEAR	NEM	3.4 km	MPC · JPL
230115	2001 BO_{76}	—	January 26, 2001	Socorro	LINEAR	·	2.6 km	MPC · JPL
230116	2001 CD_{45}	—	February 15, 2001	Socorro	LINEAR	·	4.1 km	MPC · JPL
230117	2001 DA_{3}	—	February 16, 2001	Socorro	LINEAR	·	2.1 km	MPC · JPL
230118	2001 DB_{3}	—	February 16, 2001	Socorro	LINEAR	AMO +1km	1.2 km	MPC · JPL
230119	2001 DQ_{38}	—	February 19, 2001	Socorro	LINEAR	·	3.5 km	MPC · JPL
230120	2001 DU_{44}	—	February 19, 2001	Socorro	LINEAR	DOR	4.8 km	MPC · JPL
230121	2001 DR_{83}	—	February 23, 2001	Kitt Peak	Spacewatch	·	2.8 km	MPC · JPL
230122	2001 FC_{121}	—	March 26, 2001	Socorro	LINEAR	·	2.9 km	MPC · JPL
230123	2001 KR_{3}	—	May 17, 2001	Socorro	LINEAR	·	2.0 km	MPC · JPL
230124	2001 MO_{14}	—	June 28, 2001	Anderson Mesa	LONEOS	·	1.6 km	MPC · JPL
230125	2001 MA_{15}	—	June 28, 2001	Anderson Mesa	LONEOS	·	3.0 km	MPC · JPL
230126	2001 MQ_{23}	—	June 27, 2001	Haleakala	NEAT	·	2.6 km	MPC · JPL
230127	2001 NK_{7}	—	July 13, 2001	Palomar	NEAT	TEL	2.0 km	MPC · JPL
230128	2001 OX_{19}	—	July 21, 2001	Palomar	NEAT	·	1.6 km	MPC · JPL
230129	2001 OX_{35}	—	July 21, 2001	Haleakala	NEAT	V	930 m	MPC · JPL
230130	2001 OB_{40}	—	July 20, 2001	Palomar	NEAT	·	1.6 km	MPC · JPL
230131	2001 OK_{62}	—	July 23, 2001	Haleakala	NEAT	·	1.3 km	MPC · JPL
230132	2001 OC_{78}	—	July 26, 2001	Palomar	NEAT	V	880 m	MPC · JPL
230133	2001 OD_{78}	—	July 26, 2001	Palomar	NEAT	ULA · CYB	8.1 km	MPC · JPL
230134	2001 ON_{79}	—	July 27, 2001	Palomar	NEAT	·	1.6 km	MPC · JPL
230135	2001 OD_{89}	—	July 21, 2001	Haleakala	NEAT	·	940 m	MPC · JPL
230136	2001 PH_{10}	—	August 8, 2001	Haleakala	NEAT	·	1.8 km	MPC · JPL
230137	2001 PR_{11}	—	August 11, 2001	Palomar	NEAT	·	1.8 km	MPC · JPL
230138	2001 PX_{12}	—	August 7, 2001	Haleakala	NEAT	V	1.0 km	MPC · JPL
230139	2001 PY_{14}	—	August 13, 2001	Kvistaberg	Uppsala-DLR Asteroid Survey	·	1.2 km	MPC · JPL
230140	2001 PG_{31}	—	August 10, 2001	Palomar	NEAT	·	2.5 km	MPC · JPL
230141	2001 PW_{34}	—	August 10, 2001	Palomar	NEAT	·	6.1 km	MPC · JPL
230142	2001 PJ_{51}	—	August 7, 2001	Palomar	NEAT	·	1.8 km	MPC · JPL
230143	2001 QQ_{13}	—	August 16, 2001	Socorro	LINEAR	·	2.9 km	MPC · JPL
230144	2001 QX_{35}	—	August 16, 2001	Socorro	LINEAR	(2076)	1.2 km	MPC · JPL
230145	2001 QH_{36}	—	August 16, 2001	Socorro	LINEAR	·	1.9 km	MPC · JPL
230146	2001 QD_{44}	—	August 16, 2001	Socorro	LINEAR	·	5.5 km	MPC · JPL
230147	2001 QG_{52}	—	August 16, 2001	Socorro	LINEAR	NYS	1.4 km	MPC · JPL
230148	2001 QA_{54}	—	August 16, 2001	Socorro	LINEAR	·	1.3 km	MPC · JPL
230149	2001 QX_{57}	—	August 16, 2001	Socorro	LINEAR	NYS	1.7 km	MPC · JPL
230150	2001 QV_{70}	—	August 17, 2001	Socorro	LINEAR	·	2.0 km	MPC · JPL
230151 Vachier	2001 QZ_{72}	Vachier	August 20, 2001	Pic du Midi	Pic du Midi	·	2.0 km	MPC · JPL
230152	2001 QO_{82}	—	August 17, 2001	Socorro	LINEAR	·	4.3 km	MPC · JPL
230153	2001 QK_{96}	—	August 19, 2001	Needville	Needville	·	1.6 km	MPC · JPL
230154	2001 QV_{104}	—	August 22, 2001	Socorro	LINEAR	·	2.1 km	MPC · JPL
230155 Francksallet	2001 QC_{111}	Francksallet	August 26, 2001	Vicques	M. Ory	NYS	1.5 km	MPC · JPL
230156	2001 QW_{114}	—	August 17, 2001	Socorro	LINEAR	ERI	2.7 km	MPC · JPL
230157	2001 QH_{149}	—	August 22, 2001	Haleakala	NEAT	·	1.3 km	MPC · JPL
230158	2001 QJ_{151}	—	August 23, 2001	Socorro	LINEAR	H	820 m	MPC · JPL
230159	2001 QN_{188}	—	August 22, 2001	Kitt Peak	Spacewatch	NYS ·	2.5 km	MPC · JPL
230160	2001 QQ_{207}	—	August 23, 2001	Anderson Mesa	LONEOS	·	1.3 km	MPC · JPL
230161	2001 QD_{227}	—	August 24, 2001	Anderson Mesa	LONEOS	·	2.0 km	MPC · JPL
230162	2001 QE_{244}	—	August 24, 2001	Socorro	LINEAR	V	1.1 km	MPC · JPL
230163	2001 QZ_{245}	—	August 24, 2001	Socorro	LINEAR	·	2.4 km	MPC · JPL
230164	2001 QC_{246}	—	August 24, 2001	Socorro	LINEAR	·	2.0 km	MPC · JPL
230165	2001 QO_{247}	—	August 24, 2001	Socorro	LINEAR	NYS	1.9 km	MPC · JPL
230166	2001 QD_{252}	—	August 25, 2001	Socorro	LINEAR	MAS	1.0 km	MPC · JPL
230167	2001 QH_{253}	—	August 25, 2001	Socorro	LINEAR	MAS	1.0 km	MPC · JPL
230168	2001 QO_{265}	—	August 26, 2001	Desert Eagle	W. K. Y. Yeung	·	1.4 km	MPC · JPL
230169	2001 QT_{289}	—	August 16, 2001	Socorro	LINEAR	·	1.4 km	MPC · JPL
230170	2001 QH_{329}	—	August 19, 2001	Cerro Tololo	Deep Ecliptic Survey	·	1.3 km	MPC · JPL
230171	2001 QO_{333}	—	August 25, 2001	Socorro	LINEAR	·	2.2 km	MPC · JPL
230172	2001 RO_{14}	—	September 10, 2001	Socorro	LINEAR	·	1.6 km	MPC · JPL
230173	2001 RC_{27}	—	September 7, 2001	Socorro	LINEAR	·	1.5 km	MPC · JPL
230174	2001 RX_{67}	—	September 10, 2001	Socorro	LINEAR	·	2.5 km	MPC · JPL
230175	2001 RC_{69}	—	September 10, 2001	Socorro	LINEAR	·	2.2 km	MPC · JPL
230176	2001 RX_{73}	—	September 10, 2001	Socorro	LINEAR	·	1.9 km	MPC · JPL
230177	2001 RU_{80}	—	September 14, 2001	Palomar	NEAT	·	2.7 km	MPC · JPL
230178	2001 RV_{114}	—	September 12, 2001	Socorro	LINEAR	·	1.8 km	MPC · JPL
230179	2001 RQ_{118}	—	September 12, 2001	Socorro	LINEAR	·	1.5 km	MPC · JPL
230180	2001 RT_{129}	—	September 12, 2001	Socorro	LINEAR	ERI	2.3 km	MPC · JPL
230181	2001 RA_{134}	—	September 12, 2001	Socorro	LINEAR	·	2.3 km	MPC · JPL
230182	2001 RK_{138}	—	September 12, 2001	Socorro	LINEAR	NYS	1.1 km	MPC · JPL
230183	2001 RN_{152}	—	September 11, 2001	Anderson Mesa	LONEOS	·	2.3 km	MPC · JPL
230184	2001 RT_{155}	—	September 12, 2001	Socorro	LINEAR	·	1.6 km	MPC · JPL
230185	2001 SF_{8}	—	September 18, 2001	Kitt Peak	Spacewatch	·	3.9 km	MPC · JPL
230186	2001 SV_{17}	—	September 16, 2001	Socorro	LINEAR	NYS	1.5 km	MPC · JPL
230187	2001 SD_{43}	—	September 16, 2001	Socorro	LINEAR	NYS	1.4 km	MPC · JPL
230188	2001 SX_{55}	—	September 16, 2001	Socorro	LINEAR	·	2.0 km	MPC · JPL
230189	2001 SD_{56}	—	September 16, 2001	Socorro	LINEAR	NYS	1.9 km	MPC · JPL
230190	2001 SZ_{85}	—	September 20, 2001	Socorro	LINEAR	·	6.5 km	MPC · JPL
230191	2001 SF_{103}	—	September 20, 2001	Socorro	LINEAR	·	1.6 km	MPC · JPL
230192	2001 ST_{116}	—	September 16, 2001	Socorro	LINEAR	·	2.0 km	MPC · JPL
230193	2001 SF_{119}	—	September 16, 2001	Socorro	LINEAR	·	1.7 km	MPC · JPL
230194	2001 SH_{135}	—	September 16, 2001	Socorro	LINEAR	MAS	870 m	MPC · JPL
230195	2001 SA_{145}	—	September 16, 2001	Socorro	LINEAR	·	2.8 km	MPC · JPL
230196	2001 SR_{156}	—	September 17, 2001	Socorro	LINEAR	·	1.8 km	MPC · JPL
230197	2001 SP_{162}	—	September 17, 2001	Socorro	LINEAR	·	1.7 km	MPC · JPL
230198	2001 ST_{174}	—	September 16, 2001	Socorro	LINEAR	MAS	1.4 km	MPC · JPL
230199	2001 SK_{214}	—	September 19, 2001	Socorro	LINEAR	·	1.5 km	MPC · JPL
230200	2001 SY_{229}	—	September 19, 2001	Socorro	LINEAR	NYS	2.2 km	MPC · JPL

== 230201–230300 ==
back to top

Designation			Discovery			Properties		Ref
Permanent	Provisional	Named after	Date	Site	Discoverer(s)	Category	Diam.	Ref
230201	2001 SL_{233}	—	September 19, 2001	Socorro	LINEAR	NYS	1.5 km	MPC · JPL
230202	2001 SY_{233}	—	September 19, 2001	Socorro	LINEAR	·	1.6 km	MPC · JPL
230203	2001 SX_{259}	—	September 20, 2001	Socorro	LINEAR	·	1.5 km	MPC · JPL
230204	2001 ST_{265}	—	September 25, 2001	Desert Eagle	W. K. Y. Yeung	·	1.4 km	MPC · JPL
230205	2001 SA_{285}	—	September 22, 2001	Kitt Peak	Spacewatch	CLA	2.0 km	MPC · JPL
230206	2001 SL_{291}	—	September 21, 2001	Anderson Mesa	LONEOS	EUP	7.7 km	MPC · JPL
230207	2001 SR_{295}	—	September 20, 2001	Socorro	LINEAR	·	1.5 km	MPC · JPL
230208	2001 SU_{308}	—	September 22, 2001	Socorro	LINEAR	·	1.2 km	MPC · JPL
230209	2001 SW_{346}	—	September 25, 2001	Socorro	LINEAR	V	760 m	MPC · JPL
230210	2001 TK_{2}	—	October 6, 2001	Palomar	NEAT	NYS	1.2 km	MPC · JPL
230211	2001 TR_{25}	—	October 14, 2001	Socorro	LINEAR	·	2.0 km	MPC · JPL
230212	2001 TM_{28}	—	October 14, 2001	Socorro	LINEAR	·	1.7 km	MPC · JPL
230213	2001 TP_{31}	—	October 14, 2001	Socorro	LINEAR	·	2.2 km	MPC · JPL
230214	2001 TY_{37}	—	October 14, 2001	Socorro	LINEAR	·	2.5 km	MPC · JPL
230215	2001 TT_{38}	—	October 14, 2001	Socorro	LINEAR	V	1.2 km	MPC · JPL
230216	2001 TL_{48}	—	October 9, 2001	Kitt Peak	Spacewatch	MAS	970 m	MPC · JPL
230217	2001 TD_{62}	—	October 13, 2001	Socorro	LINEAR	·	1.8 km	MPC · JPL
230218	2001 TM_{71}	—	October 13, 2001	Socorro	LINEAR	·	1.8 km	MPC · JPL
230219	2001 TN_{78}	—	October 13, 2001	Socorro	LINEAR	NYS	1.9 km	MPC · JPL
230220	2001 TD_{90}	—	October 14, 2001	Socorro	LINEAR	·	1.8 km	MPC · JPL
230221	2001 TY_{108}	—	October 14, 2001	Socorro	LINEAR	·	2.0 km	MPC · JPL
230222	2001 TV_{123}	—	October 12, 2001	Haleakala	NEAT	·	1.5 km	MPC · JPL
230223	2001 TV_{125}	—	October 12, 2001	Haleakala	NEAT	·	1.9 km	MPC · JPL
230224	2001 TS_{160}	—	October 15, 2001	Kitt Peak	Spacewatch	MAS	830 m	MPC · JPL
230225	2001 TM_{161}	—	October 11, 2001	Palomar	NEAT	·	1.4 km	MPC · JPL
230226	2001 TQ_{188}	—	October 14, 2001	Socorro	LINEAR	NYS	1.2 km	MPC · JPL
230227	2001 TH_{192}	—	October 14, 2001	Socorro	LINEAR	V	840 m	MPC · JPL
230228	2001 TU_{195}	—	October 15, 2001	Palomar	NEAT	·	2.4 km	MPC · JPL
230229	2001 TH_{199}	—	October 11, 2001	Socorro	LINEAR	·	3.4 km	MPC · JPL
230230	2001 TF_{200}	—	October 11, 2001	Socorro	LINEAR	·	1.6 km	MPC · JPL
230231	2001 TD_{258}	—	October 8, 2001	Palomar	NEAT	·	1.4 km	MPC · JPL
230232	2001 TJ_{258}	—	October 8, 2001	Palomar	NEAT	V	920 m	MPC · JPL
230233	2001 UM_{43}	—	October 17, 2001	Socorro	LINEAR	·	1.4 km	MPC · JPL
230234	2001 UP_{68}	—	October 20, 2001	Socorro	LINEAR	·	2.3 km	MPC · JPL
230235	2001 UU_{71}	—	October 20, 2001	Kitt Peak	Spacewatch	·	1.9 km	MPC · JPL
230236	2001 UR_{73}	—	October 17, 2001	Socorro	LINEAR	·	1.7 km	MPC · JPL
230237	2001 US_{83}	—	October 20, 2001	Socorro	LINEAR	·	1.8 km	MPC · JPL
230238	2001 UH_{86}	—	October 16, 2001	Kitt Peak	Spacewatch	MAS	1.0 km	MPC · JPL
230239	2001 UT_{114}	—	October 22, 2001	Socorro	LINEAR	·	1.5 km	MPC · JPL
230240	2001 UY_{114}	—	October 22, 2001	Socorro	LINEAR	NYS	1.3 km	MPC · JPL
230241	2001 UP_{128}	—	October 20, 2001	Socorro	LINEAR	·	1.8 km	MPC · JPL
230242	2001 UD_{131}	—	October 20, 2001	Socorro	LINEAR	fast	2.0 km	MPC · JPL
230243	2001 UL_{134}	—	October 21, 2001	Socorro	LINEAR	·	1.7 km	MPC · JPL
230244	2001 UD_{150}	—	October 23, 2001	Socorro	LINEAR	NYS	1.9 km	MPC · JPL
230245	2001 UF_{177}	—	October 21, 2001	Socorro	LINEAR	MAS	980 m	MPC · JPL
230246	2001 UO_{191}	—	October 18, 2001	Kitt Peak	Spacewatch	·	1.7 km	MPC · JPL
230247	2001 VC_{4}	—	November 11, 2001	Kitt Peak	Spacewatch	(194)	3.8 km	MPC · JPL
230248	2001 VT_{5}	—	November 9, 2001	Socorro	LINEAR	·	1.4 km	MPC · JPL
230249	2001 VK_{23}	—	November 9, 2001	Socorro	LINEAR	·	1.3 km	MPC · JPL
230250	2001 VU_{25}	—	November 9, 2001	Socorro	LINEAR	V	980 m	MPC · JPL
230251	2001 VT_{31}	—	November 9, 2001	Socorro	LINEAR	T_{j} (2.92) · 3:2	6.3 km	MPC · JPL
230252	2001 VN_{39}	—	November 9, 2001	Socorro	LINEAR	HNS	1.8 km	MPC · JPL
230253	2001 VO_{61}	—	November 10, 2001	Socorro	LINEAR	·	1.9 km	MPC · JPL
230254	2001 VA_{64}	—	November 10, 2001	Socorro	LINEAR	·	2.1 km	MPC · JPL
230255	2001 VQ_{85}	—	November 12, 2001	Socorro	LINEAR	·	1.4 km	MPC · JPL
230256	2001 VM_{104}	—	November 12, 2001	Socorro	LINEAR	·	1.7 km	MPC · JPL
230257	2001 VA_{105}	—	November 12, 2001	Socorro	LINEAR	NYS	1.6 km	MPC · JPL
230258	2001 WB_{8}	—	November 17, 2001	Socorro	LINEAR	·	1.6 km	MPC · JPL
230259	2001 WZ_{23}	—	November 17, 2001	Kitt Peak	Spacewatch	·	970 m	MPC · JPL
230260	2001 WT_{33}	—	November 17, 2001	Socorro	LINEAR	NYS ·	3.2 km	MPC · JPL
230261	2001 WA_{45}	—	November 18, 2001	Socorro	LINEAR	·	1.8 km	MPC · JPL
230262	2001 WL_{52}	—	November 19, 2001	Socorro	LINEAR	NYS	1.7 km	MPC · JPL
230263	2001 WC_{61}	—	November 19, 2001	Socorro	LINEAR	·	1.4 km	MPC · JPL
230264	2001 WD_{65}	—	November 20, 2001	Socorro	LINEAR	·	1.3 km	MPC · JPL
230265	2001 WM_{70}	—	November 20, 2001	Socorro	LINEAR	·	1.3 km	MPC · JPL
230266	2001 WZ_{72}	—	November 20, 2001	Socorro	LINEAR	·	1.5 km	MPC · JPL
230267	2001 WD_{93}	—	November 21, 2001	Socorro	LINEAR	·	1.8 km	MPC · JPL
230268	2001 XO_{4}	—	December 10, 2001	Socorro	LINEAR	H	940 m	MPC · JPL
230269	2001 XZ_{6}	—	December 11, 2001	Socorro	LINEAR	H	840 m	MPC · JPL
230270	2001 XE_{20}	—	December 9, 2001	Socorro	LINEAR	(5)	1.6 km	MPC · JPL
230271	2001 XL_{24}	—	December 10, 2001	Socorro	LINEAR	·	1.6 km	MPC · JPL
230272	2001 XQ_{38}	—	December 9, 2001	Socorro	LINEAR	H	870 m	MPC · JPL
230273	2001 XU_{57}	—	December 10, 2001	Socorro	LINEAR	NYS	1.5 km	MPC · JPL
230274	2001 XC_{58}	—	December 10, 2001	Socorro	LINEAR	·	1.2 km	MPC · JPL
230275	2001 XD_{77}	—	December 11, 2001	Socorro	LINEAR	MAS	1.0 km	MPC · JPL
230276	2001 XJ_{109}	—	December 11, 2001	Socorro	LINEAR	NYS	1.7 km	MPC · JPL
230277	2001 XR_{124}	—	December 14, 2001	Socorro	LINEAR	·	2.0 km	MPC · JPL
230278	2001 XW_{145}	—	December 14, 2001	Socorro	LINEAR	·	1.6 km	MPC · JPL
230279	2001 XN_{158}	—	December 14, 2001	Socorro	LINEAR	MAS	1.1 km	MPC · JPL
230280	2001 XT_{200}	—	December 15, 2001	Socorro	LINEAR	·	1.3 km	MPC · JPL
230281	2001 XO_{210}	—	December 11, 2001	Socorro	LINEAR	·	1.9 km	MPC · JPL
230282	2001 XH_{215}	—	December 13, 2001	Socorro	LINEAR	(10369)	3.5 km	MPC · JPL
230283	2001 XK_{216}	—	December 14, 2001	Socorro	LINEAR	NYS	1.5 km	MPC · JPL
230284	2001 XP_{218}	—	December 15, 2001	Socorro	LINEAR	·	2.3 km	MPC · JPL
230285	2001 XE_{225}	—	December 15, 2001	Socorro	LINEAR	MAS	1.1 km	MPC · JPL
230286	2001 XA_{228}	—	December 15, 2001	Socorro	LINEAR	·	1.6 km	MPC · JPL
230287	2001 XE_{228}	—	December 15, 2001	Socorro	LINEAR	·	2.1 km	MPC · JPL
230288	2001 XL_{243}	—	December 14, 2001	Socorro	LINEAR	·	1.7 km	MPC · JPL
230289	2001 XB_{254}	—	December 14, 2001	Socorro	LINEAR	H	1.1 km	MPC · JPL
230290	2001 YQ_{13}	—	December 17, 2001	Socorro	LINEAR	SUL · slow	3.4 km	MPC · JPL
230291	2001 YB_{31}	—	December 18, 2001	Socorro	LINEAR	·	1.9 km	MPC · JPL
230292	2001 YJ_{65}	—	December 18, 2001	Socorro	LINEAR	3:2	3.7 km	MPC · JPL
230293	2001 YS_{66}	—	December 18, 2001	Socorro	LINEAR	3:2	6.5 km	MPC · JPL
230294	2001 YW_{79}	—	December 18, 2001	Socorro	LINEAR	HIL · 3:2	5.4 km	MPC · JPL
230295	2001 YB_{121}	—	December 18, 2001	Palomar	NEAT	·	3.8 km	MPC · JPL
230296	2001 YJ_{154}	—	December 19, 2001	Palomar	NEAT	·	2.5 km	MPC · JPL
230297	2002 AT_{17}	—	January 9, 2002	Socorro	LINEAR	H	820 m	MPC · JPL
230298	2002 AE_{18}	—	January 8, 2002	Cima Ekar	ADAS	·	2.0 km	MPC · JPL
230299	2002 AZ_{30}	—	January 9, 2002	Socorro	LINEAR	·	2.8 km	MPC · JPL
230300	2002 AB_{46}	—	January 9, 2002	Socorro	LINEAR	(5)	1.3 km	MPC · JPL

== 230301–230400 ==
back to top

Designation			Discovery			Properties		Ref
Permanent	Provisional	Named after	Date	Site	Discoverer(s)	Category	Diam.	Ref
230301	2002 AL_{52}	—	January 9, 2002	Socorro	LINEAR	KON	3.7 km	MPC · JPL
230302	2002 AF_{91}	—	January 13, 2002	Socorro	LINEAR	·	1.7 km	MPC · JPL
230303	2002 AB_{105}	—	January 9, 2002	Socorro	LINEAR	MIS	3.1 km	MPC · JPL
230304	2002 AA_{110}	—	January 9, 2002	Socorro	LINEAR	·	1.5 km	MPC · JPL
230305	2002 AW_{115}	—	January 9, 2002	Socorro	LINEAR	·	3.1 km	MPC · JPL
230306	2002 AC_{131}	—	January 12, 2002	Palomar	NEAT	·	5.1 km	MPC · JPL
230307	2002 AV_{144}	—	January 13, 2002	Socorro	LINEAR	·	1.6 km	MPC · JPL
230308	2002 AJ_{161}	—	January 13, 2002	Socorro	LINEAR	·	3.8 km	MPC · JPL
230309	2002 AT_{169}	—	January 14, 2002	Socorro	LINEAR	T_{j} (2.95) · 3:2	4.8 km	MPC · JPL
230310	2002 AJ_{174}	—	January 14, 2002	Socorro	LINEAR	·	1.9 km	MPC · JPL
230311	2002 BF_{1}	—	January 19, 2002	Desert Eagle	W. K. Y. Yeung	·	1.4 km	MPC · JPL
230312	2002 BF_{15}	—	January 19, 2002	Socorro	LINEAR	·	1.8 km	MPC · JPL
230313	2002 CE_{2}	—	February 3, 2002	Palomar	NEAT	EUN	2.2 km	MPC · JPL
230314	2002 CL_{3}	—	February 6, 2002	Socorro	LINEAR	·	2.1 km	MPC · JPL
230315	2002 CT_{26}	—	February 6, 2002	Socorro	LINEAR	·	1.7 km	MPC · JPL
230316	2002 CW_{30}	—	February 6, 2002	Socorro	LINEAR	·	1.8 km	MPC · JPL
230317	2002 CY_{32}	—	February 6, 2002	Socorro	LINEAR	HNS	1.9 km	MPC · JPL
230318	2002 CG_{38}	—	February 7, 2002	Socorro	LINEAR	(5)	2.1 km	MPC · JPL
230319	2002 CH_{40}	—	February 6, 2002	Haleakala	NEAT	·	2.2 km	MPC · JPL
230320	2002 CJ_{52}	—	February 12, 2002	Desert Eagle	W. K. Y. Yeung	·	3.1 km	MPC · JPL
230321	2002 CY_{53}	—	February 7, 2002	Socorro	LINEAR	·	2.6 km	MPC · JPL
230322	2002 CQ_{77}	—	February 7, 2002	Socorro	LINEAR	·	1.9 km	MPC · JPL
230323	2002 CW_{77}	—	February 7, 2002	Socorro	LINEAR	·	3.1 km	MPC · JPL
230324	2002 CU_{83}	—	February 7, 2002	Socorro	LINEAR	·	2.0 km	MPC · JPL
230325	2002 CR_{84}	—	February 7, 2002	Socorro	LINEAR	·	1.8 km	MPC · JPL
230326	2002 CH_{86}	—	February 7, 2002	Socorro	LINEAR	·	2.0 km	MPC · JPL
230327	2002 CV_{86}	—	February 7, 2002	Socorro	LINEAR	·	2.1 km	MPC · JPL
230328	2002 CN_{91}	—	February 7, 2002	Socorro	LINEAR	EUN	1.6 km	MPC · JPL
230329	2002 CA_{98}	—	February 7, 2002	Socorro	LINEAR	·	2.4 km	MPC · JPL
230330	2002 CS_{100}	—	February 7, 2002	Socorro	LINEAR	(5)	3.1 km	MPC · JPL
230331	2002 CC_{109}	—	February 7, 2002	Socorro	LINEAR	·	1.5 km	MPC · JPL
230332	2002 CT_{119}	—	February 7, 2002	Socorro	LINEAR	·	2.1 km	MPC · JPL
230333	2002 CD_{124}	—	February 7, 2002	Socorro	LINEAR	·	2.3 km	MPC · JPL
230334	2002 CM_{142}	—	February 9, 2002	Socorro	LINEAR	HIL · 3:2 · (6124)	6.6 km	MPC · JPL
230335	2002 CD_{144}	—	February 9, 2002	Socorro	LINEAR	·	2.9 km	MPC · JPL
230336	2002 CJ_{178}	—	February 10, 2002	Socorro	LINEAR	·	2.2 km	MPC · JPL
230337	2002 CE_{180}	—	February 10, 2002	Socorro	LINEAR	·	1.4 km	MPC · JPL
230338	2002 CC_{186}	—	February 10, 2002	Socorro	LINEAR	·	1.4 km	MPC · JPL
230339	2002 CD_{200}	—	February 10, 2002	Socorro	LINEAR	L4	10 km	MPC · JPL
230340	2002 CH_{200}	—	February 10, 2002	Socorro	LINEAR	·	2.6 km	MPC · JPL
230341	2002 CF_{215}	—	February 10, 2002	Socorro	LINEAR	·	1.3 km	MPC · JPL
230342	2002 CO_{215}	—	February 10, 2002	Socorro	LINEAR	·	1.7 km	MPC · JPL
230343	2002 CA_{220}	—	February 10, 2002	Socorro	LINEAR	EUN	2.0 km	MPC · JPL
230344	2002 CR_{238}	—	February 11, 2002	Socorro	LINEAR	·	1.5 km	MPC · JPL
230345	2002 CO_{252}	—	February 4, 2002	Eskridge	Farpoint	EUN	1.4 km	MPC · JPL
230346	2002 CN_{263}	—	February 7, 2002	Socorro	LINEAR	3:2	7.9 km	MPC · JPL
230347	2002 CQ_{273}	—	February 8, 2002	Palomar	NEAT	·	2.2 km	MPC · JPL
230348	2002 CM_{277}	—	February 7, 2002	Palomar	NEAT	·	1.3 km	MPC · JPL
230349	2002 CL_{287}	—	February 8, 2002	Haleakala	NEAT	·	2.1 km	MPC · JPL
230350	2002 CE_{288}	—	February 9, 2002	Kitt Peak	Spacewatch	·	3.5 km	MPC · JPL
230351	2002 CN_{289}	—	February 10, 2002	Socorro	LINEAR	EUN	1.8 km	MPC · JPL
230352	2002 CH_{297}	—	February 11, 2002	Socorro	LINEAR	·	2.0 km	MPC · JPL
230353	2002 CK_{302}	—	February 13, 2002	Socorro	LINEAR	·	4.0 km	MPC · JPL
230354	2002 CH_{310}	—	February 6, 2002	Palomar	NEAT	MAR	1.7 km	MPC · JPL
230355	2002 CW_{314}	—	February 7, 2002	Palomar	NEAT	(5)	1.1 km	MPC · JPL
230356	2002 DG_{1}	—	February 18, 2002	Oaxaca	Roe, J. M.	·	2.2 km	MPC · JPL
230357	2002 EJ_{32}	—	March 10, 2002	Palomar	NEAT	·	4.1 km	MPC · JPL
230358	2002 EZ_{36}	—	March 9, 2002	Kitt Peak	Spacewatch	·	2.9 km	MPC · JPL
230359	2002 ER_{55}	—	March 13, 2002	Socorro	LINEAR	·	2.0 km	MPC · JPL
230360	2002 EK_{56}	—	March 13, 2002	Socorro	LINEAR	·	1.5 km	MPC · JPL
230361	2002 EA_{61}	—	March 13, 2002	Socorro	LINEAR	·	2.5 km	MPC · JPL
230362	2002 EP_{84}	—	March 9, 2002	Socorro	LINEAR	·	2.0 km	MPC · JPL
230363	2002 EU_{96}	—	March 11, 2002	Kitt Peak	Spacewatch	·	940 m	MPC · JPL
230364	2002 EF_{101}	—	March 6, 2002	Catalina	CSS	·	2.2 km	MPC · JPL
230365	2002 EX_{101}	—	March 6, 2002	Socorro	LINEAR	MAR	2.4 km	MPC · JPL
230366	2002 EP_{113}	—	March 10, 2002	Anderson Mesa	LONEOS	·	1.4 km	MPC · JPL
230367	2002 EK_{138}	—	March 12, 2002	Palomar	NEAT	(5)	2.2 km	MPC · JPL
230368	2002 EY_{152}	—	March 15, 2002	Palomar	NEAT	·	2.2 km	MPC · JPL
230369	2002 EU_{155}	—	March 11, 2002	Kitt Peak	Spacewatch	·	1.8 km	MPC · JPL
230370	2002 FQ_{1}	—	March 19, 2002	Fountain Hills	Hills, Fountain	JUN	2.6 km	MPC · JPL
230371	2002 FA_{15}	—	March 16, 2002	Anderson Mesa	LONEOS	·	3.2 km	MPC · JPL
230372	2002 FC_{15}	—	March 16, 2002	Haleakala	NEAT	·	3.6 km	MPC · JPL
230373	2002 FW_{15}	—	March 16, 2002	Haleakala	NEAT	·	3.0 km	MPC · JPL
230374	2002 GD_{9}	—	April 14, 2002	Desert Eagle	W. K. Y. Yeung	·	1.8 km	MPC · JPL
230375	2002 GM_{14}	—	April 14, 2002	Socorro	LINEAR	·	1.8 km	MPC · JPL
230376	2002 GV_{16}	—	April 15, 2002	Socorro	LINEAR	·	3.2 km	MPC · JPL
230377	2002 GP_{18}	—	April 13, 2002	Palomar	NEAT	·	3.3 km	MPC · JPL
230378	2002 GA_{20}	—	April 14, 2002	Socorro	LINEAR	·	2.9 km	MPC · JPL
230379	2002 GZ_{51}	—	April 5, 2002	Palomar	NEAT	·	1.9 km	MPC · JPL
230380	2002 GU_{52}	—	April 5, 2002	Anderson Mesa	LONEOS	·	3.5 km	MPC · JPL
230381	2002 GV_{77}	—	April 9, 2002	Socorro	LINEAR	ERI	2.3 km	MPC · JPL
230382	2002 GN_{78}	—	April 9, 2002	Socorro	LINEAR	·	2.0 km	MPC · JPL
230383	2002 GH_{83}	—	April 10, 2002	Socorro	LINEAR	·	2.5 km	MPC · JPL
230384	2002 GP_{103}	—	April 10, 2002	Socorro	LINEAR	·	4.4 km	MPC · JPL
230385	2002 GX_{117}	—	April 11, 2002	Socorro	LINEAR	·	2.4 km	MPC · JPL
230386	2002 GC_{120}	—	April 12, 2002	Palomar	NEAT	·	3.0 km	MPC · JPL
230387	2002 GH_{121}	—	April 12, 2002	Haleakala	NEAT	·	3.1 km	MPC · JPL
230388	2002 GG_{122}	—	April 10, 2002	Socorro	LINEAR	·	2.6 km	MPC · JPL
230389	2002 GR_{126}	—	April 12, 2002	Socorro	LINEAR	·	1.7 km	MPC · JPL
230390	2002 GA_{144}	—	April 11, 2002	Anderson Mesa	LONEOS	·	3.7 km	MPC · JPL
230391	2002 GV_{151}	—	April 14, 2002	Haleakala	NEAT	·	1.7 km	MPC · JPL
230392	2002 GB_{166}	—	April 15, 2002	Anderson Mesa	LONEOS	·	5.0 km	MPC · JPL
230393	2002 GP_{169}	—	April 9, 2002	Socorro	LINEAR	MIS	2.7 km	MPC · JPL
230394	2002 GK_{176}	—	April 12, 2002	Socorro	LINEAR	·	1.7 km	MPC · JPL
230395	2002 JW_{10}	—	May 7, 2002	Socorro	LINEAR	·	3.0 km	MPC · JPL
230396	2002 JM_{14}	—	May 7, 2002	Socorro	LINEAR	·	3.9 km	MPC · JPL
230397	2002 JB_{46}	—	May 9, 2002	Socorro	LINEAR	·	5.1 km	MPC · JPL
230398	2002 JR_{64}	—	May 9, 2002	Socorro	LINEAR	·	3.7 km	MPC · JPL
230399	2002 JD_{73}	—	May 8, 2002	Socorro	LINEAR	·	2.9 km	MPC · JPL
230400	2002 JY_{87}	—	May 11, 2002	Socorro	LINEAR	·	2.5 km	MPC · JPL

== 230401–230500 ==
back to top

Designation			Discovery			Properties		Ref
Permanent	Provisional	Named after	Date	Site	Discoverer(s)	Category	Diam.	Ref
230401	2002 JQ_{102}	—	May 9, 2002	Socorro	LINEAR	·	3.4 km	MPC · JPL
230402	2002 JJ_{110}	—	May 11, 2002	Socorro	LINEAR	·	2.1 km	MPC · JPL
230403	2002 JV_{121}	—	May 5, 2002	Palomar	NEAT	EUN	2.0 km	MPC · JPL
230404	2002 JW_{130}	—	May 8, 2002	Kitt Peak	Spacewatch	·	3.5 km	MPC · JPL
230405	2002 JV_{141}	—	May 11, 2002	Socorro	LINEAR	·	2.7 km	MPC · JPL
230406	2002 JM_{144}	—	May 13, 2002	Palomar	NEAT	·	1.8 km	MPC · JPL
230407	2002 KA_{2}	—	May 16, 2002	Socorro	LINEAR	·	3.7 km	MPC · JPL
230408	2002 KY_{2}	—	May 18, 2002	Palomar	NEAT	·	2.3 km	MPC · JPL
230409	2002 KG_{9}	—	May 31, 2002	Palomar	NEAT	EUN	1.9 km	MPC · JPL
230410	2002 KM_{9}	—	May 30, 2002	Palomar	NEAT	·	3.5 km	MPC · JPL
230411	2002 LZ_{20}	—	June 6, 2002	Socorro	LINEAR	·	5.6 km	MPC · JPL
230412	2002 LV_{24}	—	June 1, 2002	Palomar	NEAT	PHO	1.4 km	MPC · JPL
230413	2002 LE_{32}	—	June 10, 2002	Socorro	LINEAR	·	6.7 km	MPC · JPL
230414	2002 LW_{44}	—	June 5, 2002	Anderson Mesa	LONEOS	·	4.2 km	MPC · JPL
230415 Matthiasjung	2002 MQ_{5}	Matthiasjung	June 20, 2002	Palomar	NEAT	·	1.4 km	MPC · JPL
230416	2002 NG_{26}	—	July 9, 2002	Socorro	LINEAR	·	5.5 km	MPC · JPL
230417	2002 NV_{37}	—	July 9, 2002	Socorro	LINEAR	·	3.8 km	MPC · JPL
230418	2002 NC_{52}	—	July 14, 2002	Socorro	LINEAR	·	1.3 km	MPC · JPL
230419	2002 OE_{8}	—	July 18, 2002	Palomar	NEAT	·	4.9 km	MPC · JPL
230420	2002 PP_{6}	—	August 5, 2002	Palomar	NEAT	APO · critical	510 m	MPC · JPL
230421	2002 PD_{17}	—	August 6, 2002	Palomar	NEAT	EOS	2.7 km	MPC · JPL
230422	2002 PG_{20}	—	August 6, 2002	Palomar	NEAT	·	3.8 km	MPC · JPL
230423	2002 PZ_{28}	—	August 6, 2002	Palomar	NEAT	TIR	4.8 km	MPC · JPL
230424	2002 PD_{53}	—	August 8, 2002	Palomar	NEAT	·	3.2 km	MPC · JPL
230425	2002 PT_{67}	—	August 6, 2002	Palomar	NEAT	EOS	2.7 km	MPC · JPL
230426	2002 PD_{110}	—	August 13, 2002	Socorro	LINEAR	·	810 m	MPC · JPL
230427	2002 PO_{110}	—	August 13, 2002	Anderson Mesa	LONEOS	·	4.0 km	MPC · JPL
230428	2002 PY_{110}	—	August 13, 2002	Socorro	LINEAR	·	4.2 km	MPC · JPL
230429	2002 PC_{118}	—	August 13, 2002	Anderson Mesa	LONEOS	·	3.9 km	MPC · JPL
230430	2002 PD_{120}	—	August 13, 2002	Anderson Mesa	LONEOS	·	860 m	MPC · JPL
230431	2002 PB_{123}	—	August 15, 2002	Palomar	NEAT	·	4.5 km	MPC · JPL
230432	2002 PC_{125}	—	August 14, 2002	Socorro	LINEAR	TIR	5.8 km	MPC · JPL
230433	2002 PD_{132}	—	August 13, 2002	Socorro	LINEAR	·	7.7 km	MPC · JPL
230434 Johnhanley	2002 PV_{147}	Johnhanley	August 10, 2002	Cerro Tololo	M. W. Buie	·	2.9 km	MPC · JPL
230435	2002 PQ_{153}	—	August 8, 2002	Palomar	NEAT	·	810 m	MPC · JPL
230436	2002 PF_{156}	—	August 8, 2002	Palomar	S. F. Hönig	TIR	4.5 km	MPC · JPL
230437	2002 PO_{159}	—	August 8, 2002	Palomar	S. F. Hönig	·	3.4 km	MPC · JPL
230438	2002 PH_{161}	—	August 8, 2002	Palomar	S. F. Hönig	·	4.3 km	MPC · JPL
230439	2002 PG_{163}	—	August 8, 2002	Palomar	S. F. Hönig	EOS	2.7 km	MPC · JPL
230440	2002 PQ_{165}	—	August 8, 2002	Palomar	Lowe, A.	EOS	3.1 km	MPC · JPL
230441	2002 QT_{51}	—	August 29, 2002	Palomar	S. F. Hönig	·	3.6 km	MPC · JPL
230442	2002 QH_{61}	—	August 28, 2002	Palomar	NEAT	·	3.7 km	MPC · JPL
230443	2002 QN_{86}	—	August 17, 2002	Palomar	NEAT	EOS	2.5 km	MPC · JPL
230444	2002 QJ_{91}	—	August 19, 2002	Palomar	NEAT	·	2.6 km	MPC · JPL
230445	2002 QF_{100}	—	August 18, 2002	Palomar	NEAT	·	4.4 km	MPC · JPL
230446	2002 QT_{102}	—	August 29, 2002	Palomar	NEAT	EOS	2.6 km	MPC · JPL
230447	2002 QF_{109}	—	August 17, 2002	Palomar	NEAT	·	2.8 km	MPC · JPL
230448	2002 QB_{117}	—	August 16, 2002	Palomar	NEAT	·	4.4 km	MPC · JPL
230449	2002 QZ_{135}	—	August 30, 2002	Palomar	NEAT	·	610 m	MPC · JPL
230450	2002 QT_{136}	—	August 28, 2002	Palomar	NEAT	·	4.4 km	MPC · JPL
230451	2002 RB_{10}	—	September 4, 2002	Palomar	NEAT	THM	3.9 km	MPC · JPL
230452	2002 RF_{17}	—	September 4, 2002	Anderson Mesa	LONEOS	·	2.0 km	MPC · JPL
230453	2002 RO_{80}	—	September 5, 2002	Socorro	LINEAR	·	2.5 km	MPC · JPL
230454	2002 RB_{87}	—	September 5, 2002	Socorro	LINEAR	·	960 m	MPC · JPL
230455	2002 RE_{92}	—	September 5, 2002	Socorro	LINEAR	·	1.5 km	MPC · JPL
230456	2002 RZ_{114}	—	September 6, 2002	Socorro	LINEAR	·	4.3 km	MPC · JPL
230457	2002 RS_{118}	—	September 7, 2002	Campo Imperatore	CINEOS	·	5.4 km	MPC · JPL
230458	2002 RM_{120}	—	September 5, 2002	Haleakala	NEAT	·	1.0 km	MPC · JPL
230459	2002 RF_{129}	—	September 10, 2002	Haleakala	NEAT	·	5.7 km	MPC · JPL
230460	2002 RU_{141}	—	September 10, 2002	Haleakala	NEAT	·	760 m	MPC · JPL
230461	2002 RW_{142}	—	September 11, 2002	Palomar	NEAT	EMA	3.8 km	MPC · JPL
230462	2002 RD_{144}	—	September 11, 2002	Palomar	NEAT	·	3.6 km	MPC · JPL
230463	2002 RV_{149}	—	September 11, 2002	Haleakala	NEAT	·	4.0 km	MPC · JPL
230464	2002 RO_{151}	—	September 12, 2002	Palomar	NEAT	VER	4.8 km	MPC · JPL
230465	2002 RC_{153}	—	September 12, 2002	Palomar	NEAT	·	5.4 km	MPC · JPL
230466	2002 RO_{172}	—	September 13, 2002	Palomar	NEAT	·	3.2 km	MPC · JPL
230467	2002 RR_{172}	—	September 13, 2002	Palomar	NEAT	HYG	4.6 km	MPC · JPL
230468	2002 RX_{173}	—	September 13, 2002	Palomar	NEAT	·	4.5 km	MPC · JPL
230469	2002 RM_{175}	—	September 13, 2002	Palomar	NEAT	·	840 m	MPC · JPL
230470	2002 RX_{223}	—	September 13, 2002	Palomar	NEAT	·	3.2 km	MPC · JPL
230471	2002 RH_{228}	—	September 14, 2002	Haleakala	NEAT	V	1.0 km	MPC · JPL
230472	2002 RG_{241}	—	September 14, 2002	Palomar	R. Matson	EOS	2.7 km	MPC · JPL
230473	2002 SG_{15}	—	September 27, 2002	Palomar	NEAT	TIR	5.0 km	MPC · JPL
230474	2002 SK_{20}	—	September 26, 2002	Palomar	NEAT	EOS	2.4 km	MPC · JPL
230475	2002 SH_{67}	—	September 30, 2002	Socorro	LINEAR	·	4.9 km	MPC · JPL
230476	2002 TA_{3}	—	October 1, 2002	Anderson Mesa	LONEOS	·	1.1 km	MPC · JPL
230477	2002 TF_{10}	—	October 1, 2002	Haleakala	NEAT	·	7.3 km	MPC · JPL
230478	2002 TA_{14}	—	October 1, 2002	Socorro	LINEAR	·	1.2 km	MPC · JPL
230479	2002 TT_{36}	—	October 2, 2002	Socorro	LINEAR	·	1.8 km	MPC · JPL
230480	2002 TY_{45}	—	October 2, 2002	Socorro	LINEAR	·	910 m	MPC · JPL
230481	2002 TO_{51}	—	October 2, 2002	Socorro	LINEAR	·	1.2 km	MPC · JPL
230482	2002 TL_{54}	—	October 2, 2002	Socorro	LINEAR	·	1.3 km	MPC · JPL
230483	2002 TB_{65}	—	October 2, 2002	Kvistaberg	Uppsala-DLR Asteroid Survey	(1118)	6.2 km	MPC · JPL
230484	2002 TJ_{73}	—	October 3, 2002	Palomar	NEAT	V	1.1 km	MPC · JPL
230485	2002 TH_{76}	—	October 1, 2002	Anderson Mesa	LONEOS	·	930 m	MPC · JPL
230486	2002 TM_{86}	—	October 3, 2002	Socorro	LINEAR	THM	3.0 km	MPC · JPL
230487	2002 TT_{86}	—	October 3, 2002	Socorro	LINEAR	EOS	3.3 km	MPC · JPL
230488	2002 TL_{91}	—	October 3, 2002	Palomar	NEAT	V	950 m	MPC · JPL
230489	2002 TG_{100}	—	October 4, 2002	Socorro	LINEAR	·	630 m	MPC · JPL
230490	2002 TO_{128}	—	October 4, 2002	Palomar	NEAT	·	1.3 km	MPC · JPL
230491	2002 TF_{165}	—	October 2, 2002	Haleakala	NEAT	·	1.8 km	MPC · JPL
230492	2002 TO_{195}	—	October 3, 2002	Socorro	LINEAR	·	1.1 km	MPC · JPL
230493	2002 TP_{199}	—	October 3, 2002	Palomar	NEAT	·	5.3 km	MPC · JPL
230494	2002 TO_{214}	—	October 4, 2002	Socorro	LINEAR	·	5.7 km	MPC · JPL
230495	2002 TE_{232}	—	October 6, 2002	Socorro	LINEAR	·	4.8 km	MPC · JPL
230496	2002 TQ_{242}	—	October 9, 2002	Socorro	LINEAR	·	1.1 km	MPC · JPL
230497	2002 TG_{258}	—	October 9, 2002	Socorro	LINEAR	·	670 m	MPC · JPL
230498	2002 TJ_{268}	—	October 9, 2002	Socorro	LINEAR	·	1.1 km	MPC · JPL
230499	2002 TH_{274}	—	October 9, 2002	Socorro	LINEAR	·	1 km	MPC · JPL
230500	2002 TM_{279}	—	October 10, 2002	Socorro	LINEAR	·	1.2 km	MPC · JPL

== 230501–230600 ==
back to top

Designation			Discovery			Properties		Ref
Permanent	Provisional	Named after	Date	Site	Discoverer(s)	Category	Diam.	Ref
230501	2002 TR_{285}	—	October 10, 2002	Socorro	LINEAR	·	1.2 km	MPC · JPL
230502	2002 TR_{288}	—	October 10, 2002	Socorro	LINEAR	·	1.3 km	MPC · JPL
230503	2002 TC_{385}	—	October 5, 2002	Apache Point	SDSS	·	3.6 km	MPC · JPL
230504	2002 UG_{2}	—	October 28, 2002	Palomar	NEAT	·	880 m	MPC · JPL
230505	2002 UH_{34}	—	October 30, 2002	Kitt Peak	Spacewatch	CYB	6.3 km	MPC · JPL
230506	2002 UG_{49}	—	October 31, 2002	Socorro	LINEAR	·	1.4 km	MPC · JPL
230507	2002 VQ_{9}	—	November 1, 2002	Palomar	NEAT	·	1.2 km	MPC · JPL
230508	2002 VP_{17}	—	November 5, 2002	Socorro	LINEAR	·	990 m	MPC · JPL
230509	2002 VM_{19}	—	November 4, 2002	Palomar	NEAT	V	870 m	MPC · JPL
230510	2002 VW_{37}	—	November 5, 2002	Socorro	LINEAR	·	1.5 km	MPC · JPL
230511	2002 VD_{38}	—	November 5, 2002	Socorro	LINEAR	·	770 m	MPC · JPL
230512	2002 VT_{40}	—	November 1, 2002	Palomar	NEAT	·	870 m	MPC · JPL
230513	2002 VZ_{51}	—	November 6, 2002	Anderson Mesa	LONEOS	·	1.3 km	MPC · JPL
230514	2002 VQ_{60}	—	November 3, 2002	Haleakala	NEAT	·	870 m	MPC · JPL
230515	2002 VV_{94}	—	November 12, 2002	Socorro	LINEAR	·	980 m	MPC · JPL
230516	2002 VQ_{106}	—	November 12, 2002	Socorro	LINEAR	V	1.1 km	MPC · JPL
230517	2002 VC_{119}	—	November 12, 2002	Socorro	LINEAR	·	1.4 km	MPC · JPL
230518	2002 VE_{126}	—	November 12, 2002	Socorro	LINEAR	·	1.1 km	MPC · JPL
230519	2002 WY_{5}	—	November 24, 2002	Palomar	NEAT	·	1.8 km	MPC · JPL
230520	2002 WE_{8}	—	November 24, 2002	Palomar	NEAT	·	1.1 km	MPC · JPL
230521	2002 WM_{11}	—	November 27, 2002	Anderson Mesa	LONEOS	PHO	1.4 km	MPC · JPL
230522	2002 WM_{19}	—	November 24, 2002	Palomar	S. F. Hönig	·	770 m	MPC · JPL
230523	2002 WN_{19}	—	November 24, 2002	Palomar	S. F. Hönig	·	870 m	MPC · JPL
230524	2002 WD_{20}	—	November 25, 2002	Palomar	S. F. Hönig	·	1.5 km	MPC · JPL
230525	2002 XW_{5}	—	December 1, 2002	Socorro	LINEAR	·	1.2 km	MPC · JPL
230526	2002 XB_{11}	—	December 3, 2002	Palomar	NEAT	·	1.1 km	MPC · JPL
230527	2002 XF_{24}	—	December 5, 2002	Socorro	LINEAR	·	1.4 km	MPC · JPL
230528	2002 XZ_{26}	—	December 5, 2002	Anderson Mesa	LONEOS	·	980 m	MPC · JPL
230529	2002 XX_{28}	—	December 5, 2002	Socorro	LINEAR	·	1.4 km	MPC · JPL
230530	2002 XO_{35}	—	December 5, 2002	Fountain Hills	C. W. Juels, P. R. Holvorcem	PHO	1.6 km	MPC · JPL
230531	2002 XY_{66}	—	December 10, 2002	Socorro	LINEAR	·	660 m	MPC · JPL
230532	2002 XE_{76}	—	December 11, 2002	Socorro	LINEAR	·	1.5 km	MPC · JPL
230533	2002 XE_{95}	—	December 5, 2002	Socorro	LINEAR	·	850 m	MPC · JPL
230534	2002 XK_{98}	—	December 5, 2002	Socorro	LINEAR	·	4.1 km	MPC · JPL
230535	2002 XW_{99}	—	December 5, 2002	Socorro	LINEAR	·	1.1 km	MPC · JPL
230536	2002 YX_{5}	—	December 27, 2002	Anderson Mesa	LONEOS	·	970 m	MPC · JPL
230537	2002 YE_{15}	—	December 31, 2002	Kitt Peak	Spacewatch	·	1.4 km	MPC · JPL
230538	2002 YG_{16}	—	December 31, 2002	Socorro	LINEAR	·	1.1 km	MPC · JPL
230539	2002 YC_{23}	—	December 31, 2002	Socorro	LINEAR	·	1.5 km	MPC · JPL
230540	2002 YX_{24}	—	December 31, 2002	Socorro	LINEAR	·	1.0 km	MPC · JPL
230541	2002 YR_{25}	—	December 31, 2002	Socorro	LINEAR	·	1.3 km	MPC · JPL
230542	2003 AC_{2}	—	January 2, 2003	Socorro	LINEAR	·	1.6 km	MPC · JPL
230543	2003 AM_{3}	—	January 3, 2003	Socorro	LINEAR	PHO	1.6 km	MPC · JPL
230544	2003 AC_{55}	—	January 5, 2003	Socorro	LINEAR	·	1.2 km	MPC · JPL
230545	2003 AM_{61}	—	January 7, 2003	Socorro	LINEAR	(2076)	1.3 km	MPC · JPL
230546	2003 AQ_{69}	—	January 8, 2003	Socorro	LINEAR	·	1.8 km	MPC · JPL
230547	2003 AY_{82}	—	January 8, 2003	Socorro	LINEAR	·	1.2 km	MPC · JPL
230548	2003 AT_{90}	—	January 5, 2003	Anderson Mesa	LONEOS	·	1.7 km	MPC · JPL
230549	2003 BH	—	January 18, 2003	Haleakala	NEAT	APO · PHA	220 m	MPC · JPL
230550	2003 BM	—	January 21, 2003	Wrightwood	J. W. Young	·	760 m	MPC · JPL
230551	2003 BD_{2}	—	January 25, 2003	Anderson Mesa	LONEOS	·	1.2 km	MPC · JPL
230552	2003 BK_{8}	—	January 26, 2003	Anderson Mesa	LONEOS	·	1.1 km	MPC · JPL
230553	2003 BS_{8}	—	January 26, 2003	Anderson Mesa	LONEOS	·	1.4 km	MPC · JPL
230554	2003 BS_{10}	—	January 26, 2003	Anderson Mesa	LONEOS	·	2.0 km	MPC · JPL
230555	2003 BY_{11}	—	January 26, 2003	Anderson Mesa	LONEOS	·	1.4 km	MPC · JPL
230556	2003 BU_{15}	—	January 26, 2003	Anderson Mesa	LONEOS	·	1.3 km	MPC · JPL
230557	2003 BC_{25}	—	January 25, 2003	Palomar	NEAT	·	1.6 km	MPC · JPL
230558	2003 BM_{27}	—	January 26, 2003	Anderson Mesa	LONEOS	·	1.4 km	MPC · JPL
230559	2003 BC_{42}	—	January 27, 2003	Socorro	LINEAR	·	970 m	MPC · JPL
230560	2003 BY_{43}	—	January 28, 2003	Palomar	NEAT	·	1.7 km	MPC · JPL
230561	2003 BH_{47}	—	January 28, 2003	Haleakala	NEAT	BRA	2.1 km	MPC · JPL
230562	2003 BW_{50}	—	January 27, 2003	Socorro	LINEAR	·	810 m	MPC · JPL
230563	2003 BO_{51}	—	January 27, 2003	Socorro	LINEAR	·	2.5 km	MPC · JPL
230564	2003 BK_{54}	—	January 27, 2003	Palomar	NEAT	·	1.5 km	MPC · JPL
230565	2003 BG_{55}	—	January 27, 2003	Haleakala	NEAT	·	1.8 km	MPC · JPL
230566	2003 BH_{58}	—	January 27, 2003	Socorro	LINEAR	·	1.3 km	MPC · JPL
230567	2003 BL_{58}	—	January 27, 2003	Socorro	LINEAR	·	1.7 km	MPC · JPL
230568	2003 BN_{58}	—	January 27, 2003	Socorro	LINEAR	MAS	950 m	MPC · JPL
230569	2003 BA_{60}	—	January 27, 2003	Socorro	LINEAR	·	1.6 km	MPC · JPL
230570	2003 BQ_{64}	—	January 30, 2003	Anderson Mesa	LONEOS	·	1.0 km	MPC · JPL
230571	2003 BS_{65}	—	January 30, 2003	Anderson Mesa	LONEOS	·	1.1 km	MPC · JPL
230572	2003 BF_{70}	—	January 30, 2003	Anderson Mesa	LONEOS	·	1.1 km	MPC · JPL
230573	2003 BR_{79}	—	January 31, 2003	Socorro	LINEAR	·	900 m	MPC · JPL
230574	2003 BK_{81}	—	January 31, 2003	Socorro	LINEAR	·	1.0 km	MPC · JPL
230575	2003 BN_{83}	—	January 31, 2003	Socorro	LINEAR	·	1.8 km	MPC · JPL
230576	2003 BE_{88}	—	January 27, 2003	Socorro	LINEAR	·	1.3 km	MPC · JPL
230577	2003 BZ_{88}	—	January 28, 2003	Socorro	LINEAR	·	1.4 km	MPC · JPL
230578	2003 CA_{3}	—	February 2, 2003	Anderson Mesa	LONEOS	·	1.2 km	MPC · JPL
230579	2003 CU_{3}	—	February 2, 2003	Palomar	NEAT	·	1.8 km	MPC · JPL
230580	2003 CH_{4}	—	February 1, 2003	Anderson Mesa	LONEOS	·	1.3 km	MPC · JPL
230581	2003 CX_{5}	—	February 1, 2003	Socorro	LINEAR	·	1.2 km	MPC · JPL
230582	2003 CQ_{9}	—	February 2, 2003	Socorro	LINEAR	ERI	2.5 km	MPC · JPL
230583	2003 CU_{16}	—	February 7, 2003	Desert Eagle	W. K. Y. Yeung	·	1.1 km	MPC · JPL
230584	2003 DS_{16}	—	February 21, 2003	Palomar	NEAT	MAS	940 m	MPC · JPL
230585	2003 DY_{17}	—	February 19, 2003	Palomar	NEAT	·	1.5 km	MPC · JPL
230586	2003 DE_{19}	—	February 21, 2003	Palomar	NEAT	·	1.5 km	MPC · JPL
230587	2003 DW_{19}	—	February 22, 2003	Palomar	NEAT	V	840 m	MPC · JPL
230588	2003 DB_{24}	—	February 22, 2003	Palomar	NEAT	·	1.4 km	MPC · JPL
230589	2003 EM_{12}	—	March 6, 2003	Socorro	LINEAR	·	1.8 km	MPC · JPL
230590	2003 EE_{13}	—	March 6, 2003	Palomar	NEAT	NYS	1.2 km	MPC · JPL
230591	2003 EO_{25}	—	March 6, 2003	Anderson Mesa	LONEOS	NYS	1.4 km	MPC · JPL
230592	2003 EH_{27}	—	March 6, 2003	Socorro	LINEAR	·	1.6 km	MPC · JPL
230593	2003 EF_{29}	—	March 6, 2003	Socorro	LINEAR	·	1.6 km	MPC · JPL
230594	2003 EF_{33}	—	March 7, 2003	Kitt Peak	Spacewatch	·	1.3 km	MPC · JPL
230595	2003 EM_{33}	—	March 7, 2003	Anderson Mesa	LONEOS	·	1.2 km	MPC · JPL
230596	2003 EQ_{35}	—	March 7, 2003	Socorro	LINEAR	·	1.3 km	MPC · JPL
230597	2003 ES_{45}	—	March 7, 2003	Socorro	LINEAR	ERI	2.3 km	MPC · JPL
230598	2003 EH_{52}	—	March 11, 2003	Palomar	NEAT	·	2.5 km	MPC · JPL
230599	2003 FJ_{1}	—	March 24, 2003	Socorro	LINEAR	APO +1km	970 m	MPC · JPL
230600	2003 FR_{7}	—	March 30, 2003	Desert Moon	Stevens, B. L.	·	1.4 km	MPC · JPL

== 230601–230700 ==
back to top

Designation			Discovery			Properties		Ref
Permanent	Provisional	Named after	Date	Site	Discoverer(s)	Category	Diam.	Ref
230601	2003 FQ_{12}	—	March 22, 2003	Kvistaberg	Uppsala-DLR Asteroid Survey	·	1.3 km	MPC · JPL
230602	2003 FW_{20}	—	March 23, 2003	Kitt Peak	Spacewatch	(6769)	1.9 km	MPC · JPL
230603	2003 FN_{22}	—	March 25, 2003	Kitt Peak	Spacewatch	·	2.1 km	MPC · JPL
230604	2003 FV_{25}	—	March 24, 2003	Kitt Peak	Spacewatch	·	2.6 km	MPC · JPL
230605	2003 FY_{38}	—	March 23, 2003	Kitt Peak	Spacewatch	·	1.3 km	MPC · JPL
230606	2003 FP_{40}	—	March 25, 2003	Palomar	NEAT	V	1.0 km	MPC · JPL
230607	2003 FQ_{51}	—	March 25, 2003	Catalina	CSS	·	2.2 km	MPC · JPL
230608	2003 FC_{54}	—	March 25, 2003	Haleakala	NEAT	·	1.8 km	MPC · JPL
230609	2003 FP_{66}	—	March 26, 2003	Palomar	NEAT	·	1.7 km	MPC · JPL
230610	2003 FF_{73}	—	March 26, 2003	Haleakala	NEAT	NYS	1.8 km	MPC · JPL
230611	2003 FV_{79}	—	March 27, 2003	Palomar	NEAT	·	1.7 km	MPC · JPL
230612	2003 FJ_{80}	—	March 27, 2003	Socorro	LINEAR	·	3.0 km	MPC · JPL
230613	2003 FG_{81}	—	March 27, 2003	Socorro	LINEAR	·	1.8 km	MPC · JPL
230614	2003 FX_{82}	—	March 27, 2003	Catalina	CSS	·	1.6 km	MPC · JPL
230615	2003 FP_{88}	—	March 28, 2003	Kitt Peak	Spacewatch	NYS	1.9 km	MPC · JPL
230616	2003 FN_{100}	—	March 31, 2003	Anderson Mesa	LONEOS	·	2.1 km	MPC · JPL
230617	2003 FW_{104}	—	March 26, 2003	Kitt Peak	Spacewatch	fast	1.3 km	MPC · JPL
230618	2003 FW_{116}	—	March 24, 2003	Kitt Peak	Spacewatch	NYS	2.7 km	MPC · JPL
230619	2003 FG_{119}	—	March 26, 2003	Anderson Mesa	LONEOS	NYS	2.0 km	MPC · JPL
230620	2003 FH_{130}	—	March 27, 2003	Kitt Peak	Spacewatch	·	1.3 km	MPC · JPL
230621	2003 FW_{130}	—	March 31, 2003	Anderson Mesa	LONEOS	·	1.8 km	MPC · JPL
230622	2003 GO_{14}	—	April 2, 2003	Haleakala	NEAT	·	1.9 km	MPC · JPL
230623	2003 GH_{27}	—	April 6, 2003	Kitt Peak	Spacewatch	·	1.8 km	MPC · JPL
230624	2003 GU_{39}	—	April 8, 2003	Socorro	LINEAR	·	1.8 km	MPC · JPL
230625	2003 HX_{14}	—	April 26, 2003	Haleakala	NEAT	·	1.8 km	MPC · JPL
230626	2003 HY_{18}	—	April 25, 2003	Kitt Peak	Spacewatch	·	1.5 km	MPC · JPL
230627	2003 HF_{45}	—	April 29, 2003	Socorro	LINEAR	MAS	1.0 km	MPC · JPL
230628	2003 HB_{54}	—	April 24, 2003	Anderson Mesa	LONEOS	NYS	1.5 km	MPC · JPL
230629	2003 HR_{55}	—	April 29, 2003	Anderson Mesa	LONEOS	·	1.4 km	MPC · JPL
230630	2003 KP_{36}	—	May 30, 2003	Socorro	LINEAR	EUN	2.0 km	MPC · JPL
230631 Justino	2003 MB	Justino	June 18, 2003	Sierra Nevada	Sota, A.	·	2.4 km	MPC · JPL
230632	2003 MO_{3}	—	June 25, 2003	Socorro	LINEAR	·	2.1 km	MPC · JPL
230633	2003 MH_{5}	—	June 26, 2003	Socorro	LINEAR	·	7.4 km	MPC · JPL
230634	2003 QR_{2}	—	August 19, 2003	Campo Imperatore	CINEOS	·	2.8 km	MPC · JPL
230635	2003 QO_{3}	—	August 18, 2003	Wise	Polishook, D.	·	3.2 km	MPC · JPL
230636	2003 QG_{7}	—	August 21, 2003	Palomar	NEAT	·	2.2 km	MPC · JPL
230637	2003 QD_{24}	—	August 21, 2003	Palomar	NEAT	·	4.0 km	MPC · JPL
230638	2003 QO_{43}	—	August 22, 2003	Palomar	NEAT	·	4.5 km	MPC · JPL
230639	2003 QJ_{55}	—	August 23, 2003	Socorro	LINEAR	·	3.7 km	MPC · JPL
230640	2003 QE_{89}	—	August 26, 2003	Socorro	LINEAR	AGN	2.1 km	MPC · JPL
230641	2003 QS_{114}	—	August 26, 2003	Socorro	LINEAR	·	3.0 km	MPC · JPL
230642	2003 QW_{114}	—	August 21, 2003	Campo Imperatore	CINEOS	·	2.0 km	MPC · JPL
230643	2003 RQ_{10}	—	September 8, 2003	Haleakala	NEAT	DOR	5.1 km	MPC · JPL
230644	2003 RP_{12}	—	September 14, 2003	Haleakala	NEAT	·	5.4 km	MPC · JPL
230645	2003 RZ_{15}	—	September 15, 2003	Palomar	NEAT	AEO	1.7 km	MPC · JPL
230646	2003 RF_{19}	—	September 15, 2003	Anderson Mesa	LONEOS	AGN	1.9 km	MPC · JPL
230647	2003 SN_{11}	—	September 16, 2003	Kitt Peak	Spacewatch	·	4.7 km	MPC · JPL
230648 Zikmund	2003 SL_{15}	Zikmund	September 17, 2003	Kleť	KLENOT	·	2.7 km	MPC · JPL
230649	2003 SM_{27}	—	September 18, 2003	Socorro	LINEAR	AGN	1.7 km	MPC · JPL
230650	2003 SC_{30}	—	September 18, 2003	Palomar	NEAT	PAD	2.5 km	MPC · JPL
230651	2003 SF_{30}	—	September 18, 2003	Palomar	NEAT	AGN	2.3 km	MPC · JPL
230652	2003 SH_{90}	—	September 18, 2003	Socorro	LINEAR	·	5.0 km	MPC · JPL
230653	2003 SC_{95}	—	September 19, 2003	Kitt Peak	Spacewatch	·	2.8 km	MPC · JPL
230654	2003 SD_{99}	—	September 19, 2003	Kitt Peak	Spacewatch	·	2.5 km	MPC · JPL
230655	2003 SM_{101}	—	September 20, 2003	Palomar	NEAT	EOS	2.6 km	MPC · JPL
230656 Kovácspál	2003 SX_{111}	Kovácspál	September 19, 2003	Piszkéstető	K. Sárneczky, B. Sipőcz	·	2.6 km	MPC · JPL
230657	2003 SQ_{115}	—	September 16, 2003	Kitt Peak	Spacewatch	PAD	2.4 km	MPC · JPL
230658	2003 SC_{117}	—	September 16, 2003	Palomar	NEAT	·	3.2 km	MPC · JPL
230659	2003 SA_{119}	—	September 16, 2003	Kitt Peak	Spacewatch	·	3.3 km	MPC · JPL
230660	2003 SO_{138}	—	September 20, 2003	Palomar	NEAT	·	3.9 km	MPC · JPL
230661	2003 ST_{159}	—	September 22, 2003	Kitt Peak	Spacewatch	·	3.4 km	MPC · JPL
230662	2003 SX_{177}	—	September 19, 2003	Socorro	LINEAR	·	4.4 km	MPC · JPL
230663	2003 SV_{188}	—	September 22, 2003	Anderson Mesa	LONEOS	·	3.0 km	MPC · JPL
230664	2003 SX_{191}	—	September 19, 2003	Palomar	NEAT	EMA	5.8 km	MPC · JPL
230665	2003 SD_{198}	—	September 21, 2003	Anderson Mesa	LONEOS	·	4.8 km	MPC · JPL
230666	2003 SL_{199}	—	September 21, 2003	Anderson Mesa	LONEOS	·	4.3 km	MPC · JPL
230667 Janmlynář	2003 SZ_{200}	Janmlynář	September 25, 2003	Kleť	KLENOT	AGN	2.0 km	MPC · JPL
230668	2003 SC_{201}	—	September 23, 2003	Sierra Nevada	Sota, A.	·	2.6 km	MPC · JPL
230669	2003 SJ_{222}	—	September 27, 2003	Desert Eagle	W. K. Y. Yeung	·	2.8 km	MPC · JPL
230670	2003 SU_{248}	—	September 26, 2003	Socorro	LINEAR	THM	3.3 km	MPC · JPL
230671	2003 SH_{253}	—	September 27, 2003	Kitt Peak	Spacewatch	HOF	4.3 km	MPC · JPL
230672	2003 SC_{267}	—	September 29, 2003	Socorro	LINEAR	·	2.2 km	MPC · JPL
230673	2003 ST_{269}	—	September 30, 2003	Goodricke-Pigott	Kessel, J. W.	slow	5.8 km	MPC · JPL
230674	2003 SV_{279}	—	September 18, 2003	Kitt Peak	Spacewatch	·	3.2 km	MPC · JPL
230675	2003 SC_{286}	—	September 20, 2003	Palomar	NEAT	·	2.4 km	MPC · JPL
230676	2003 SP_{292}	—	September 25, 2003	Palomar	NEAT	EOS	2.6 km	MPC · JPL
230677	2003 SO_{297}	—	September 18, 2003	Haleakala	NEAT	·	4.9 km	MPC · JPL
230678	2003 SK_{309}	—	September 27, 2003	Socorro	LINEAR	·	5.3 km	MPC · JPL
230679	2003 SG_{325}	—	September 17, 2003	Kitt Peak	Spacewatch	HYG	3.6 km	MPC · JPL
230680	2003 TD_{1}	—	October 4, 2003	Kingsnake	J. V. McClusky	·	5.3 km	MPC · JPL
230681	2003 TQ_{3}	—	October 5, 2003	Great Shefford	Birtwhistle, P.	·	2.7 km	MPC · JPL
230682	2003 TR_{20}	—	October 15, 2003	Palomar	NEAT	·	4.0 km	MPC · JPL
230683	2003 TD_{21}	—	October 15, 2003	Anderson Mesa	LONEOS	·	3.9 km	MPC · JPL
230684	2003 TQ_{37}	—	October 2, 2003	Kitt Peak	Spacewatch	GEF	1.7 km	MPC · JPL
230685	2003 TK_{39}	—	October 2, 2003	Kitt Peak	Spacewatch	·	2.8 km	MPC · JPL
230686	2003 TC_{45}	—	October 3, 2003	Kitt Peak	Spacewatch	·	3.4 km	MPC · JPL
230687	2003 TK_{51}	—	October 5, 2003	Kitt Peak	Spacewatch	·	4.6 km	MPC · JPL
230688	2003 TH_{56}	—	October 5, 2003	Kitt Peak	Spacewatch	·	1.5 km	MPC · JPL
230689	2003 UY_{15}	—	October 16, 2003	Anderson Mesa	LONEOS	ARM	6.3 km	MPC · JPL
230690	2003 UX_{16}	—	October 16, 2003	Črni Vrh	Mikuž, H.	·	3.2 km	MPC · JPL
230691 Van Vogt	2003 UD_{18}	Van Vogt	October 18, 2003	Saint-Sulpice	B. Christophe	·	2.6 km	MPC · JPL
230692	2003 UG_{35}	—	October 16, 2003	Palomar	NEAT	·	2.6 km	MPC · JPL
230693	2003 UF_{49}	—	October 16, 2003	Anderson Mesa	LONEOS	·	4.0 km	MPC · JPL
230694	2003 US_{55}	—	October 18, 2003	Palomar	NEAT	·	5.4 km	MPC · JPL
230695	2003 UZ_{57}	—	October 16, 2003	Kitt Peak	Spacewatch	EOS	2.4 km	MPC · JPL
230696	2003 UG_{60}	—	October 17, 2003	Anderson Mesa	LONEOS	·	5.8 km	MPC · JPL
230697	2003 UT_{64}	—	October 16, 2003	Anderson Mesa	LONEOS	·	3.2 km	MPC · JPL
230698	2003 UB_{72}	—	October 19, 2003	Socorro	LINEAR	·	2.8 km	MPC · JPL
230699	2003 UO_{77}	—	October 17, 2003	Anderson Mesa	LONEOS	EOS	3.0 km	MPC · JPL
230700	2003 UB_{78}	—	October 17, 2003	Anderson Mesa	LONEOS	·	3.6 km	MPC · JPL

== 230701–230800 ==
back to top

Designation			Discovery			Properties		Ref
Permanent	Provisional	Named after	Date	Site	Discoverer(s)	Category	Diam.	Ref
230701	2003 UP_{79}	—	October 19, 2003	Anderson Mesa	LONEOS	URS	5.4 km	MPC · JPL
230702	2003 UC_{93}	—	October 20, 2003	Kitt Peak	Spacewatch	·	1.9 km	MPC · JPL
230703	2003 UJ_{100}	—	October 19, 2003	Palomar	NEAT	·	4.1 km	MPC · JPL
230704	2003 UX_{104}	—	October 18, 2003	Kitt Peak	Spacewatch	·	2.4 km	MPC · JPL
230705	2003 UK_{120}	—	October 18, 2003	Kitt Peak	Spacewatch	·	1.2 km	MPC · JPL
230706	2003 UQ_{130}	—	October 19, 2003	Palomar	NEAT	TIR	2.9 km	MPC · JPL
230707	2003 UW_{132}	—	October 19, 2003	Palomar	NEAT	·	4.4 km	MPC · JPL
230708	2003 UX_{133}	—	October 20, 2003	Palomar	NEAT	·	6.5 km	MPC · JPL
230709	2003 UK_{134}	—	October 20, 2003	Palomar	NEAT	·	3.8 km	MPC · JPL
230710	2003 UL_{138}	—	October 21, 2003	Socorro	LINEAR	HYG	4.1 km	MPC · JPL
230711	2003 US_{141}	—	October 18, 2003	Anderson Mesa	LONEOS	·	2.9 km	MPC · JPL
230712	2003 UJ_{147}	—	October 18, 2003	Anderson Mesa	LONEOS	·	3.8 km	MPC · JPL
230713	2003 UY_{150}	—	October 21, 2003	Kitt Peak	Spacewatch	·	3.2 km	MPC · JPL
230714	2003 UY_{152}	—	October 21, 2003	Kitt Peak	Spacewatch	·	3.1 km	MPC · JPL
230715	2003 UC_{154}	—	October 19, 2003	Kitt Peak	Spacewatch	THM	3.0 km	MPC · JPL
230716	2003 UO_{168}	—	October 22, 2003	Socorro	LINEAR	·	3.4 km	MPC · JPL
230717	2003 UG_{186}	—	October 22, 2003	Kitt Peak	Spacewatch	TEL	2.0 km	MPC · JPL
230718	2003 UX_{187}	—	October 22, 2003	Socorro	LINEAR	EMA	5.7 km	MPC · JPL
230719	2003 UF_{189}	—	October 22, 2003	Kitt Peak	Spacewatch	(159)	5.1 km	MPC · JPL
230720	2003 UW_{192}	—	October 20, 2003	Kitt Peak	Spacewatch	HYG	4.6 km	MPC · JPL
230721	2003 UA_{199}	—	October 21, 2003	Socorro	LINEAR	·	3.0 km	MPC · JPL
230722	2003 UD_{202}	—	October 21, 2003	Socorro	LINEAR	·	3.1 km	MPC · JPL
230723	2003 UO_{203}	—	October 21, 2003	Kitt Peak	Spacewatch	·	3.0 km	MPC · JPL
230724	2003 UO_{246}	—	October 24, 2003	Socorro	LINEAR	·	3.5 km	MPC · JPL
230725	2003 UN_{247}	—	October 24, 2003	Haleakala	NEAT	·	4.1 km	MPC · JPL
230726	2003 US_{266}	—	October 28, 2003	Socorro	LINEAR	·	6.6 km	MPC · JPL
230727	2003 UJ_{279}	—	October 27, 2003	Socorro	LINEAR	·	3.4 km	MPC · JPL
230728 Tedstryk	2003 UE_{316}	Tedstryk	October 22, 2003	Kitt Peak	M. W. Buie	·	2.3 km	MPC · JPL
230729	2003 US_{316}	—	October 27, 2003	Kitt Peak	Spacewatch	·	3.0 km	MPC · JPL
230730	2003 UM_{320}	—	October 22, 2003	Palomar	NEAT	EOS	2.9 km	MPC · JPL
230731	2003 UO_{328}	—	October 17, 2003	Apache Point	SDSS	·	4.1 km	MPC · JPL
230732	2003 VJ_{2}	—	November 4, 2003	Socorro	LINEAR	·	7.2 km	MPC · JPL
230733	2003 VC_{4}	—	November 14, 2003	Palomar	NEAT	·	3.2 km	MPC · JPL
230734	2003 WF_{1}	—	November 16, 2003	Catalina	CSS	·	3.4 km	MPC · JPL
230735	2003 WO_{1}	—	November 16, 2003	Catalina	CSS	·	3.0 km	MPC · JPL
230736 Jalyhome	2003 WV_{2}	Jalyhome	November 18, 2003	Begues	Begues	EOS	2.7 km	MPC · JPL
230737	2003 WX_{7}	—	November 18, 2003	Wrightwood	J. W. Young	·	3.9 km	MPC · JPL
230738	2003 WO_{10}	—	November 18, 2003	Kitt Peak	Spacewatch	·	5.0 km	MPC · JPL
230739	2003 WU_{11}	—	November 18, 2003	Palomar	NEAT	·	3.8 km	MPC · JPL
230740	2003 WZ_{19}	—	November 19, 2003	Socorro	LINEAR	·	5.5 km	MPC · JPL
230741	2003 WF_{27}	—	November 16, 2003	Kitt Peak	Spacewatch	EOS	2.9 km	MPC · JPL
230742	2003 WO_{27}	—	November 16, 2003	Kitt Peak	Spacewatch	·	2.7 km	MPC · JPL
230743	2003 WM_{30}	—	November 18, 2003	Kitt Peak	Spacewatch	TIR	2.7 km	MPC · JPL
230744	2003 WW_{34}	—	November 19, 2003	Kitt Peak	Spacewatch	EOS	3.2 km	MPC · JPL
230745	2003 WM_{57}	—	November 18, 2003	Kitt Peak	Spacewatch	·	3.7 km	MPC · JPL
230746	2003 WA_{66}	—	November 19, 2003	Socorro	LINEAR	·	3.3 km	MPC · JPL
230747	2003 WM_{75}	—	November 18, 2003	Kitt Peak	Spacewatch	·	5.0 km	MPC · JPL
230748	2003 WF_{102}	—	November 21, 2003	Socorro	LINEAR	·	4.1 km	MPC · JPL
230749	2003 WU_{111}	—	November 20, 2003	Socorro	LINEAR	·	3.7 km	MPC · JPL
230750	2003 WM_{118}	—	November 20, 2003	Socorro	LINEAR	·	3.1 km	MPC · JPL
230751	2003 WP_{132}	—	November 20, 2003	Socorro	LINEAR	·	3.1 km	MPC · JPL
230752	2003 WP_{134}	—	November 21, 2003	Socorro	LINEAR	·	3.4 km	MPC · JPL
230753	2003 WA_{159}	—	November 29, 2003	Kitt Peak	Spacewatch	THM	4.1 km	MPC · JPL
230754	2003 WW_{163}	—	November 30, 2003	Kitt Peak	Spacewatch	·	3.4 km	MPC · JPL
230755	2003 WT_{169}	—	November 19, 2003	Catalina	CSS	·	1.9 km	MPC · JPL
230756	2003 WV_{169}	—	November 19, 2003	Palomar	NEAT	·	5.0 km	MPC · JPL
230757	2003 WK_{170}	—	November 20, 2003	Palomar	NEAT	·	4.3 km	MPC · JPL
230758	2003 WP_{171}	—	November 23, 2003	Anderson Mesa	LONEOS	·	5.3 km	MPC · JPL
230759 Anishahosadurga	2003 WE_{183}	Anishahosadurga	November 23, 2003	Kitt Peak	M. W. Buie	·	6.0 km	MPC · JPL
230760	2003 WG_{189}	—	November 20, 2003	Palomar	NEAT	·	4.5 km	MPC · JPL
230761	2003 WV_{189}	—	November 23, 2003	Catalina	CSS	·	5.2 km	MPC · JPL
230762	2003 WP_{192}	—	November 23, 2003	Socorro	LINEAR	T_{j} (2.97)	7.6 km	MPC · JPL
230763	2003 XX_{1}	—	December 1, 2003	Socorro	LINEAR	·	6.0 km	MPC · JPL
230764	2003 XW_{12}	—	December 13, 2003	Socorro	LINEAR	·	1.1 km	MPC · JPL
230765 Alfbester	2003 XN_{15}	Alfbester	December 15, 2003	Saint-Sulpice	B. Christophe	·	4.3 km	MPC · JPL
230766	2003 XQ_{19}	—	December 14, 2003	Palomar	NEAT	·	3.6 km	MPC · JPL
230767	2003 XH_{22}	—	December 5, 2003	Socorro	LINEAR	·	1.4 km	MPC · JPL
230768	2003 XL_{35}	—	December 3, 2003	Socorro	LINEAR	·	5.6 km	MPC · JPL
230769	2003 YU_{10}	—	December 17, 2003	Socorro	LINEAR	HYG	4.2 km	MPC · JPL
230770	2003 YV_{10}	—	December 17, 2003	Socorro	LINEAR	HYG	4.4 km	MPC · JPL
230771	2003 YY_{23}	—	December 17, 2003	Socorro	LINEAR	·	6.0 km	MPC · JPL
230772	2003 YU_{25}	—	December 18, 2003	Socorro	LINEAR	·	3.8 km	MPC · JPL
230773	2003 YW_{56}	—	December 19, 2003	Socorro	LINEAR	·	4.3 km	MPC · JPL
230774	2003 YC_{63}	—	December 19, 2003	Socorro	LINEAR	·	5.3 km	MPC · JPL
230775	2003 YX_{71}	—	December 18, 2003	Socorro	LINEAR	·	4.7 km	MPC · JPL
230776	2003 YG_{74}	—	December 18, 2003	Socorro	LINEAR	·	7.1 km	MPC · JPL
230777	2003 YX_{104}	—	December 21, 2003	Socorro	LINEAR	HYG	4.1 km	MPC · JPL
230778	2003 YW_{118}	—	December 27, 2003	Kitt Peak	Spacewatch	TIR	4.6 km	MPC · JPL
230779	2003 YG_{127}	—	December 27, 2003	Socorro	LINEAR	·	4.0 km	MPC · JPL
230780	2003 YA_{139}	—	December 27, 2003	Kitt Peak	Spacewatch	·	4.9 km	MPC · JPL
230781	2003 YE_{139}	—	December 28, 2003	Socorro	LINEAR	·	6.4 km	MPC · JPL
230782	2003 YC_{145}	—	December 28, 2003	Socorro	LINEAR	·	3.0 km	MPC · JPL
230783	2003 YK_{145}	—	December 28, 2003	Socorro	LINEAR	·	7.0 km	MPC · JPL
230784	2003 YZ_{150}	—	December 29, 2003	Catalina	CSS	T_{j} (2.92)	3.9 km	MPC · JPL
230785	2003 YC_{152}	—	December 29, 2003	Socorro	LINEAR	·	4.7 km	MPC · JPL
230786	2003 YO_{167}	—	December 18, 2003	Socorro	LINEAR	·	2.8 km	MPC · JPL
230787	2004 BE_{13}	—	January 17, 2004	Palomar	NEAT	CYB	6.3 km	MPC · JPL
230788	2004 BV_{47}	—	January 21, 2004	Socorro	LINEAR	·	5.3 km	MPC · JPL
230789	2004 BT_{81}	—	January 26, 2004	Anderson Mesa	LONEOS	·	6.5 km	MPC · JPL
230790	2004 BT_{98}	—	January 27, 2004	Kitt Peak	Spacewatch	·	1.6 km	MPC · JPL
230791	2004 BC_{107}	—	January 28, 2004	Kitt Peak	Spacewatch	·	6.1 km	MPC · JPL
230792	2004 BL_{114}	—	January 29, 2004	Anderson Mesa	LONEOS	·	1.4 km	MPC · JPL
230793	2004 BQ_{139}	—	January 19, 2004	Kitt Peak	Spacewatch	·	4.1 km	MPC · JPL
230794	2004 BT_{148}	—	January 16, 2004	Kitt Peak	Spacewatch	·	4.2 km	MPC · JPL
230795	2004 DW_{17}	—	February 18, 2004	Kitt Peak	Spacewatch	·	3.9 km	MPC · JPL
230796	2004 EJ	—	March 10, 2004	Palomar	NEAT	V	1.0 km	MPC · JPL
230797	2004 ED_{13}	—	March 11, 2004	Palomar	NEAT	·	1.2 km	MPC · JPL
230798	2004 EF_{31}	—	March 13, 2004	Palomar	NEAT	·	980 m	MPC · JPL
230799	2004 EV_{59}	—	March 15, 2004	Palomar	NEAT	·	1.1 km	MPC · JPL
230800	2004 EO_{62}	—	March 12, 2004	Palomar	NEAT	·	3.1 km	MPC · JPL

== 230801–230900 ==
back to top

Designation			Discovery			Properties		Ref
Permanent	Provisional	Named after	Date	Site	Discoverer(s)	Category	Diam.	Ref
230801	2004 ES_{79}	—	March 15, 2004	Palomar	NEAT	·	1.3 km	MPC · JPL
230802	2004 FR_{13}	—	March 16, 2004	Kitt Peak	Spacewatch	V	990 m	MPC · JPL
230803	2004 FO_{41}	—	March 18, 2004	Kitt Peak	Spacewatch	·	1.6 km	MPC · JPL
230804	2004 FA_{68}	—	March 20, 2004	Socorro	LINEAR	·	1.2 km	MPC · JPL
230805	2004 FX_{104}	—	March 23, 2004	Socorro	LINEAR	·	1.7 km	MPC · JPL
230806	2004 FU_{116}	—	March 23, 2004	Socorro	LINEAR	·	1.1 km	MPC · JPL
230807	2004 FO_{136}	—	March 27, 2004	Anderson Mesa	LONEOS	·	1.3 km	MPC · JPL
230808	2004 GH_{21}	—	April 11, 2004	Palomar	NEAT	·	1.6 km	MPC · JPL
230809	2004 GF_{79}	—	April 9, 2004	Siding Spring	SSS	·	1.2 km	MPC · JPL
230810	2004 HJ_{12}	—	April 20, 2004	Reedy Creek	J. Broughton	·	1.7 km	MPC · JPL
230811	2004 HG_{16}	—	April 17, 2004	Socorro	LINEAR	·	1.1 km	MPC · JPL
230812	2004 HN_{34}	—	April 17, 2004	Socorro	LINEAR	·	1.2 km	MPC · JPL
230813	2004 HX_{37}	—	April 23, 2004	Kitt Peak	Spacewatch	·	2.0 km	MPC · JPL
230814	2004 JK_{14}	—	May 9, 2004	Kitt Peak	Spacewatch	·	1.5 km	MPC · JPL
230815	2004 JD_{23}	—	May 13, 2004	Anderson Mesa	LONEOS	·	970 m	MPC · JPL
230816	2004 JN_{30}	—	May 15, 2004	Socorro	LINEAR	·	1.1 km	MPC · JPL
230817	2004 JC_{31}	—	May 15, 2004	Socorro	LINEAR	·	930 m	MPC · JPL
230818	2004 JZ_{33}	—	May 15, 2004	Socorro	LINEAR	·	980 m	MPC · JPL
230819	2004 LZ_{6}	—	June 11, 2004	Socorro	LINEAR	·	1.7 km	MPC · JPL
230820	2004 LY_{7}	—	June 11, 2004	Socorro	LINEAR	·	2.1 km	MPC · JPL
230821	2004 LT_{11}	—	June 12, 2004	Siding Spring	SSS	·	2.5 km	MPC · JPL
230822	2004 LO_{13}	—	June 11, 2004	Socorro	LINEAR	·	2.7 km	MPC · JPL
230823	2004 MR_{4}	—	June 21, 2004	Reedy Creek	J. Broughton	·	1.7 km	MPC · JPL
230824	2004 NO_{12}	—	July 11, 2004	Socorro	LINEAR	·	1.7 km	MPC · JPL
230825	2004 NM_{13}	—	July 11, 2004	Socorro	LINEAR	(2076)	1.1 km	MPC · JPL
230826	2004 NX_{13}	—	July 11, 2004	Socorro	LINEAR	·	2.8 km	MPC · JPL
230827	2004 NM_{14}	—	July 11, 2004	Socorro	LINEAR	·	3.0 km	MPC · JPL
230828	2004 OE_{9}	—	July 19, 2004	Anderson Mesa	LONEOS	·	1.6 km	MPC · JPL
230829	2004 PB_{21}	—	August 7, 2004	Palomar	NEAT	·	990 m	MPC · JPL
230830	2004 PE_{32}	—	August 8, 2004	Socorro	LINEAR	·	1.8 km	MPC · JPL
230831	2004 PV_{38}	—	August 9, 2004	Anderson Mesa	LONEOS	·	3.0 km	MPC · JPL
230832	2004 PB_{40}	—	August 9, 2004	Socorro	LINEAR	·	3.9 km	MPC · JPL
230833	2004 PY_{44}	—	August 7, 2004	Palomar	NEAT	·	3.6 km	MPC · JPL
230834	2004 PD_{47}	—	August 8, 2004	Palomar	NEAT	(5)	1.9 km	MPC · JPL
230835	2004 PP_{49}	—	August 8, 2004	Socorro	LINEAR	·	1.4 km	MPC · JPL
230836	2004 PO_{84}	—	August 10, 2004	Anderson Mesa	LONEOS	·	3.3 km	MPC · JPL
230837	2004 PO_{88}	—	August 11, 2004	Palomar	NEAT	·	2.6 km	MPC · JPL
230838	2004 PU_{89}	—	August 10, 2004	Socorro	LINEAR	·	3.5 km	MPC · JPL
230839	2004 PE_{103}	—	August 12, 2004	Socorro	LINEAR	·	2.8 km	MPC · JPL
230840	2004 QV_{3}	—	August 21, 2004	Catalina	CSS	V	920 m	MPC · JPL
230841	2004 QP_{6}	—	August 22, 2004	Kitt Peak	Spacewatch	·	2.3 km	MPC · JPL
230842	2004 QD_{10}	—	August 21, 2004	Siding Spring	SSS	·	3.7 km	MPC · JPL
230843	2004 QG_{25}	—	August 20, 2004	Catalina	CSS	·	2.4 km	MPC · JPL
230844	2004 RR	—	September 3, 2004	Palomar	NEAT	·	2.7 km	MPC · JPL
230845	2004 RP_{20}	—	September 7, 2004	Kitt Peak	Spacewatch	NYS	1.4 km	MPC · JPL
230846	2004 RZ_{36}	—	September 7, 2004	Kitt Peak	Spacewatch	NYS	1.6 km	MPC · JPL
230847	2004 RQ_{37}	—	September 7, 2004	Socorro	LINEAR	·	1.4 km	MPC · JPL
230848	2004 RF_{42}	—	September 7, 2004	Kitt Peak	Spacewatch	·	1.9 km	MPC · JPL
230849	2004 RD_{53}	—	September 8, 2004	Socorro	LINEAR	·	1.3 km	MPC · JPL
230850	2004 RV_{70}	—	September 8, 2004	Socorro	LINEAR	·	2.0 km	MPC · JPL
230851	2004 RN_{80}	—	September 8, 2004	Socorro	LINEAR	NYS	1.4 km	MPC · JPL
230852	2004 RU_{81}	—	September 8, 2004	Socorro	LINEAR	·	1.3 km	MPC · JPL
230853	2004 RZ_{83}	—	September 9, 2004	Kleť	Kleť	·	2.2 km	MPC · JPL
230854	2004 RQ_{101}	—	September 8, 2004	Socorro	LINEAR	EUN	1.5 km	MPC · JPL
230855	2004 RQ_{102}	—	September 8, 2004	Socorro	LINEAR	·	2.4 km	MPC · JPL
230856	2004 RB_{105}	—	September 8, 2004	Palomar	NEAT	·	3.4 km	MPC · JPL
230857	2004 RU_{127}	—	September 7, 2004	Kitt Peak	Spacewatch	·	1.6 km	MPC · JPL
230858	2004 RN_{156}	—	September 10, 2004	Socorro	LINEAR	PHO	2.1 km	MPC · JPL
230859	2004 RG_{162}	—	September 11, 2004	Socorro	LINEAR	·	4.6 km	MPC · JPL
230860	2004 RZ_{165}	—	September 6, 2004	Palomar	NEAT	·	1.2 km	MPC · JPL
230861	2004 RJ_{177}	—	September 10, 2004	Socorro	LINEAR	EUN	2.2 km	MPC · JPL
230862	2004 RA_{178}	—	September 10, 2004	Socorro	LINEAR	·	1.9 km	MPC · JPL
230863	2004 RS_{182}	—	September 10, 2004	Socorro	LINEAR	·	2.1 km	MPC · JPL
230864	2004 RR_{183}	—	September 10, 2004	Socorro	LINEAR	·	1.6 km	MPC · JPL
230865	2004 RN_{188}	—	September 10, 2004	Socorro	LINEAR	·	2.2 km	MPC · JPL
230866	2004 RM_{189}	—	September 10, 2004	Socorro	LINEAR	EUN	2.5 km	MPC · JPL
230867	2004 RE_{193}	—	September 10, 2004	Socorro	LINEAR	TEL	2.5 km	MPC · JPL
230868	2004 RT_{193}	—	September 10, 2004	Socorro	LINEAR	·	2.6 km	MPC · JPL
230869	2004 RJ_{196}	—	September 10, 2004	Socorro	LINEAR	·	3.2 km	MPC · JPL
230870	2004 RW_{198}	—	September 10, 2004	Kitt Peak	Spacewatch	·	1.8 km	MPC · JPL
230871	2004 RA_{199}	—	September 10, 2004	Socorro	LINEAR	·	2.8 km	MPC · JPL
230872	2004 RG_{199}	—	September 10, 2004	Socorro	LINEAR	slow	4.4 km	MPC · JPL
230873	2004 RE_{208}	—	September 11, 2004	Socorro	LINEAR	·	3.6 km	MPC · JPL
230874	2004 RM_{210}	—	September 11, 2004	Socorro	LINEAR	·	2.0 km	MPC · JPL
230875	2004 RJ_{213}	—	September 11, 2004	Socorro	LINEAR	·	2.2 km	MPC · JPL
230876	2004 RV_{214}	—	September 11, 2004	Socorro	LINEAR	·	2.3 km	MPC · JPL
230877	2004 RC_{219}	—	September 11, 2004	Socorro	LINEAR	·	3.1 km	MPC · JPL
230878	2004 RY_{244}	—	September 10, 2004	Kitt Peak	Spacewatch	·	1.3 km	MPC · JPL
230879	2004 RV_{253}	—	September 6, 2004	Palomar	NEAT	·	2.9 km	MPC · JPL
230880	2004 RB_{255}	—	September 6, 2004	Palomar	NEAT	·	2.9 km	MPC · JPL
230881	2004 RC_{303}	—	September 12, 2004	Kitt Peak	Spacewatch	·	1.4 km	MPC · JPL
230882	2004 RQ_{306}	—	September 12, 2004	Socorro	LINEAR	(5)	2.1 km	MPC · JPL
230883	2004 RK_{317}	—	September 11, 2004	Palomar	NEAT	·	2.4 km	MPC · JPL
230884	2004 RB_{320}	—	September 13, 2004	Socorro	LINEAR	·	1.7 km	MPC · JPL
230885	2004 RF_{338}	—	September 15, 2004	Kitt Peak	Spacewatch	·	2.3 km	MPC · JPL
230886	2004 RZ_{340}	—	September 7, 2004	Socorro	LINEAR	·	2.1 km	MPC · JPL
230887	2004 RW_{345}	—	September 8, 2004	Socorro	LINEAR	·	2.6 km	MPC · JPL
230888	2004 SD_{10}	—	September 16, 2004	Siding Spring	SSS	·	1.9 km	MPC · JPL
230889	2004 SG_{26}	—	September 16, 2004	Socorro	LINEAR	·	6.2 km	MPC · JPL
230890	2004 SP_{31}	—	September 17, 2004	Socorro	LINEAR	·	2.1 km	MPC · JPL
230891	2004 SL_{32}	—	September 17, 2004	Socorro	LINEAR	·	4.2 km	MPC · JPL
230892	2004 SV_{52}	—	September 22, 2004	Socorro	LINEAR	·	2.0 km	MPC · JPL
230893	2004 TH_{2}	—	October 4, 2004	Kitt Peak	Spacewatch	·	3.5 km	MPC · JPL
230894	2004 TV_{4}	—	October 4, 2004	Kitt Peak	Spacewatch	·	4.4 km	MPC · JPL
230895	2004 TF_{12}	—	October 7, 2004	Goodricke-Pigott	R. A. Tucker	·	3.6 km	MPC · JPL
230896	2004 TN_{18}	—	October 12, 2004	Goodricke-Pigott	R. A. Tucker	·	3.5 km	MPC · JPL
230897	2004 TB_{23}	—	October 4, 2004	Kitt Peak	Spacewatch	·	2.5 km	MPC · JPL
230898	2004 TK_{34}	—	October 4, 2004	Kitt Peak	Spacewatch	·	1.4 km	MPC · JPL
230899	2004 TT_{46}	—	October 4, 2004	Kitt Peak	Spacewatch	MAS	1.1 km	MPC · JPL
230900	2004 TT_{59}	—	October 5, 2004	Kitt Peak	Spacewatch	·	2.5 km	MPC · JPL

== 230901–231000 ==
back to top

Designation			Discovery			Properties		Ref
Permanent	Provisional	Named after	Date	Site	Discoverer(s)	Category	Diam.	Ref
230901	2004 TL_{63}	—	October 5, 2004	Kitt Peak	Spacewatch	·	2.5 km	MPC · JPL
230902	2004 TW_{67}	—	October 5, 2004	Anderson Mesa	LONEOS	·	3.1 km	MPC · JPL
230903	2004 TW_{69}	—	October 5, 2004	Palomar	NEAT	·	2.8 km	MPC · JPL
230904	2004 TG_{75}	—	October 6, 2004	Kitt Peak	Spacewatch	·	1.5 km	MPC · JPL
230905	2004 TW_{88}	—	October 5, 2004	Kitt Peak	Spacewatch	·	1.5 km	MPC · JPL
230906	2004 TX_{89}	—	October 5, 2004	Anderson Mesa	LONEOS	·	1.7 km	MPC · JPL
230907	2004 TJ_{100}	—	October 5, 2004	Anderson Mesa	LONEOS	(5)	3.5 km	MPC · JPL
230908	2004 TJ_{172}	—	October 8, 2004	Socorro	LINEAR	·	2.5 km	MPC · JPL
230909	2004 TU_{175}	—	October 9, 2004	Socorro	LINEAR	·	2.2 km	MPC · JPL
230910	2004 TE_{194}	—	October 7, 2004	Kitt Peak	Spacewatch	·	1.7 km	MPC · JPL
230911	2004 TR_{201}	—	October 7, 2004	Kitt Peak	Spacewatch	·	2.0 km	MPC · JPL
230912	2004 TB_{223}	—	October 7, 2004	Socorro	LINEAR	MAR	1.8 km	MPC · JPL
230913	2004 TA_{243}	—	October 6, 2004	Socorro	LINEAR	·	3.2 km	MPC · JPL
230914	2004 TD_{260}	—	October 9, 2004	Socorro	LINEAR	·	3.8 km	MPC · JPL
230915	2004 TN_{261}	—	October 9, 2004	Kitt Peak	Spacewatch	·	1.9 km	MPC · JPL
230916	2004 TA_{276}	—	October 9, 2004	Kitt Peak	Spacewatch	·	2.1 km	MPC · JPL
230917	2004 TR_{276}	—	October 9, 2004	Kitt Peak	Spacewatch	·	2.1 km	MPC · JPL
230918	2004 TK_{300}	—	October 8, 2004	Socorro	LINEAR	·	2.6 km	MPC · JPL
230919	2004 TR_{300}	—	October 8, 2004	Socorro	LINEAR	·	3.3 km	MPC · JPL
230920	2004 TZ_{323}	—	October 11, 2004	Kitt Peak	Spacewatch	·	2.5 km	MPC · JPL
230921	2004 TA_{349}	—	October 7, 2004	Kitt Peak	Spacewatch	·	3.1 km	MPC · JPL
230922	2004 TL_{355}	—	October 7, 2004	Socorro	LINEAR	·	3.7 km	MPC · JPL
230923	2004 TL_{357}	—	October 14, 2004	Anderson Mesa	LONEOS	MAR	1.7 km	MPC · JPL
230924	2004 TZ_{361}	—	October 15, 2004	Socorro	LINEAR	·	2.9 km	MPC · JPL
230925	2004 TP_{366}	—	October 8, 2004	Kitt Peak	Spacewatch	·	1.9 km	MPC · JPL
230926	2004 UW_{8}	—	October 23, 2004	Socorro	LINEAR	·	1.7 km	MPC · JPL
230927	2004 VJ_{20}	—	November 4, 2004	Catalina	CSS	·	2.8 km	MPC · JPL
230928	2004 VD_{54}	—	November 3, 2004	Catalina	CSS	·	3.0 km	MPC · JPL
230929	2004 VJ_{55}	—	November 10, 2004	Desert Eagle	W. K. Y. Yeung	·	2.8 km	MPC · JPL
230930	2004 VL_{72}	—	November 4, 2004	Catalina	CSS	WIT	1.6 km	MPC · JPL
230931	2004 VF_{73}	—	November 5, 2004	Palomar	NEAT	·	4.1 km	MPC · JPL
230932	2004 VQ_{78}	—	November 2, 2004	Anderson Mesa	LONEOS	·	3.2 km	MPC · JPL
230933	2004 VQ_{83}	—	November 10, 2004	Kitt Peak	Spacewatch	·	3.8 km	MPC · JPL
230934	2004 WX_{6}	—	November 19, 2004	Socorro	LINEAR	·	5.3 km	MPC · JPL
230935	2004 WC_{8}	—	November 19, 2004	Catalina	CSS	AGN	1.7 km	MPC · JPL
230936	2004 XC_{2}	—	December 1, 2004	Catalina	CSS	GEF	1.9 km	MPC · JPL
230937	2004 XD_{2}	—	December 1, 2004	Catalina	CSS	(32418)	3.2 km	MPC · JPL
230938	2004 XR_{7}	—	December 2, 2004	Socorro	LINEAR	HYG	5.7 km	MPC · JPL
230939	2004 XH_{10}	—	December 2, 2004	Palomar	NEAT	·	2.3 km	MPC · JPL
230940	2004 XP_{17}	—	December 3, 2004	Kitt Peak	Spacewatch	KOR	2.5 km	MPC · JPL
230941	2004 XN_{22}	—	December 8, 2004	Socorro	LINEAR	·	3.4 km	MPC · JPL
230942	2004 XX_{29}	—	December 10, 2004	Socorro	LINEAR	·	2.7 km	MPC · JPL
230943	2004 XM_{33}	—	December 10, 2004	Socorro	LINEAR	·	4.2 km	MPC · JPL
230944	2004 XA_{35}	—	December 11, 2004	Kitt Peak	Spacewatch	·	2.4 km	MPC · JPL
230945	2004 XQ_{36}	—	December 11, 2004	Campo Imperatore	CINEOS	·	2.4 km	MPC · JPL
230946	2004 XT_{45}	—	December 9, 2004	Kitt Peak	Spacewatch	·	4.6 km	MPC · JPL
230947	2004 XY_{54}	—	December 10, 2004	Socorro	LINEAR	·	2.7 km	MPC · JPL
230948	2004 XG_{58}	—	December 10, 2004	Kitt Peak	Spacewatch	·	3.4 km	MPC · JPL
230949	2004 XY_{73}	—	December 7, 2004	Socorro	LINEAR	·	2.6 km	MPC · JPL
230950	2004 XW_{80}	—	December 10, 2004	Socorro	LINEAR	·	5.3 km	MPC · JPL
230951	2004 XJ_{82}	—	December 11, 2004	Kitt Peak	Spacewatch	·	4.5 km	MPC · JPL
230952	2004 XM_{87}	—	December 9, 2004	Catalina	CSS	·	2.7 km	MPC · JPL
230953	2004 XD_{94}	—	December 11, 2004	Kitt Peak	Spacewatch	WIT	1.7 km	MPC · JPL
230954	2004 XV_{98}	—	December 11, 2004	Kitt Peak	Spacewatch	·	3.9 km	MPC · JPL
230955	2004 XX_{111}	—	December 10, 2004	Kitt Peak	Spacewatch	WIT	1.3 km	MPC · JPL
230956	2004 XT_{112}	—	December 10, 2004	Kitt Peak	Spacewatch	HOF	3.6 km	MPC · JPL
230957	2004 XW_{120}	—	December 14, 2004	Socorro	LINEAR	·	3.9 km	MPC · JPL
230958	2004 XP_{128}	—	December 14, 2004	Socorro	LINEAR	·	2.7 km	MPC · JPL
230959	2004 XF_{135}	—	December 15, 2004	Socorro	LINEAR	HOF	5.0 km	MPC · JPL
230960	2004 XY_{162}	—	December 15, 2004	Catalina	CSS	·	2.7 km	MPC · JPL
230961	2004 XC_{174}	—	December 10, 2004	Kitt Peak	Spacewatch	·	4.5 km	MPC · JPL
230962	2004 XJ_{177}	—	December 11, 2004	Kitt Peak	Spacewatch	·	5.9 km	MPC · JPL
230963	2004 XH_{182}	—	December 2, 2004	Anderson Mesa	LONEOS	·	2.6 km	MPC · JPL
230964	2004 XK_{191}	—	December 11, 2004	Kitt Peak	Spacewatch	·	3.7 km	MPC · JPL
230965	2004 XA_{192}	—	December 12, 2004	Palomar	Palomar	other TNO	339 km	MPC · JPL
230966	2004 YR_{15}	—	December 18, 2004	Mount Lemmon	Mount Lemmon Survey	·	2.3 km	MPC · JPL
230967	2004 YA_{19}	—	December 18, 2004	Mount Lemmon	Mount Lemmon Survey	ELF	6.3 km	MPC · JPL
230968	2004 YL_{20}	—	December 18, 2004	Mount Lemmon	Mount Lemmon Survey	·	3.5 km	MPC · JPL
230969	2004 YJ_{21}	—	December 18, 2004	Mount Lemmon	Mount Lemmon Survey	EOS	2.4 km	MPC · JPL
230970	2004 YA_{31}	—	December 18, 2004	Kitt Peak	Spacewatch	·	5.7 km	MPC · JPL
230971	2005 AF_{2}	—	January 6, 2005	Catalina	CSS	TIR	5.3 km	MPC · JPL
230972	2005 AG_{2}	—	January 6, 2005	Catalina	CSS	H	750 m	MPC · JPL
230973	2005 AM_{5}	—	January 6, 2005	Catalina	CSS	·	4.8 km	MPC · JPL
230974	2005 AZ_{14}	—	January 6, 2005	Socorro	LINEAR	AGN	1.7 km	MPC · JPL
230975 Rogerfederer	2005 AQ_{25}	Rogerfederer	January 10, 2005	Vicques	M. Ory	·	3.2 km	MPC · JPL
230976	2005 AG_{28}	—	January 10, 2005	Kitami	K. Endate	·	2.9 km	MPC · JPL
230977	2005 AW_{32}	—	January 11, 2005	Socorro	LINEAR	H	960 m	MPC · JPL
230978	2005 AR_{41}	—	January 15, 2005	Socorro	LINEAR	EOS	3.8 km	MPC · JPL
230979	2005 AT_{42}	—	January 15, 2005	Anderson Mesa	LONEOS	T_{j} (2.97) · AMO +1km	1.5 km	MPC · JPL
230980	2005 AS_{47}	—	January 13, 2005	Vail-Jarnac	Jarnac	·	3.1 km	MPC · JPL
230981	2005 AA_{62}	—	January 15, 2005	Kitt Peak	Spacewatch	·	6.5 km	MPC · JPL
230982	2005 AH_{76}	—	January 15, 2005	Kitt Peak	Spacewatch	·	2.3 km	MPC · JPL
230983	2005 AQ_{77}	—	January 15, 2005	Kitt Peak	Spacewatch	·	4.3 km	MPC · JPL
230984	2005 AP_{78}	—	January 15, 2005	Kitt Peak	Spacewatch	·	3.5 km	MPC · JPL
230985	2005 BY_{19}	—	January 16, 2005	Socorro	LINEAR	·	4.1 km	MPC · JPL
230986	2005 BF_{28}	—	January 31, 2005	Socorro	LINEAR	H	760 m	MPC · JPL
230987	2005 BD_{48}	—	January 17, 2005	Catalina	CSS	·	6.3 km	MPC · JPL
230988	2005 CJ_{4}	—	February 1, 2005	Kitt Peak	Spacewatch	·	2.7 km	MPC · JPL
230989	2005 CR_{10}	—	February 1, 2005	Kitt Peak	Spacewatch	·	3.7 km	MPC · JPL
230990	2005 CP_{13}	—	February 2, 2005	Kitt Peak	Spacewatch	·	4.6 km	MPC · JPL
230991	2005 CO_{14}	—	February 2, 2005	Kitt Peak	Spacewatch	·	3.2 km	MPC · JPL
230992	2005 CX_{14}	—	February 2, 2005	Kitt Peak	Spacewatch	·	2.9 km	MPC · JPL
230993	2005 CK_{23}	—	February 2, 2005	Catalina	CSS	EOS	3.2 km	MPC · JPL
230994	2005 CW_{42}	—	February 2, 2005	Socorro	LINEAR	LIX	4.9 km	MPC · JPL
230995	2005 CX_{42}	—	February 2, 2005	Socorro	LINEAR	·	5.3 km	MPC · JPL
230996	2005 CV_{56}	—	February 2, 2005	Kitt Peak	Spacewatch	·	3.3 km	MPC · JPL
230997	2005 CS_{62}	—	February 9, 2005	Kitt Peak	Spacewatch	·	2.7 km	MPC · JPL
230998	2005 CM_{65}	—	February 9, 2005	Kitt Peak	Spacewatch	EOS	3.1 km	MPC · JPL
230999	2005 CX_{65}	—	February 9, 2005	Kitt Peak	Spacewatch	EOS	2.6 km	MPC · JPL
231000	2005 CU_{70}	—	February 1, 2005	Catalina	CSS	·	2.8 km	MPC · JPL

back to top

== See also ==
- Meanings of minor-planet names: 230001–231000
