= Žiga Svete =

Slovenian ice hockey player

- Born: April 13, 1985 (age 40) Bled, Slovenia
- Height: 5 ft 11 in (180 cm)
- Weight: 185 lb (84 kg; 13 st 3 lb)
- Position: Defence
- Catches: Left
- Slohokej team: HK Partizan
- National team: Slovenia
- NHL draft: Undrafted
- Playing career: 2001–present

Žiga Svete (born 13 April 1985, in Bled) is a Slovenian ice hockey defenceman. He is currently playing with HK Partizan of the Slohokej Liga.

Svete has played for the Slovenian junior national team in three IIHF World Junior Championships, and he played with the Slovenia men's national ice hockey team at the 2009 IIHF World Championship Division I.
