= Žika Bujuklić =

Serbian politician and academic

- Жика Бујуклић

Member of the National Assembly of the Republic of Serbia
- In office 1 August 2022 – 6 February 2024

Personal details
- Born: 1952 (age 73–74) Belgrade, PR Serbia, FPR Yugoslavia
- Party: Independent

Žika Bujuklić (Serbian Cyrillic: Жика Бујуклић; born 1952) is a Serbian academic and politician. He served in the Serbian national assembly from 2022 to 2024 as an independent delegate endorsed by the Serbian Progressive Party (SNS).

== Early life and academic career ==
Bujuklić was born in Belgrade, in what was then the People's Republic of Serbia in the Federal People's Republic of Yugoslavia. After graduating from the violin department of the Stanković Musical School, he attended the University of Belgrade Faculty of Law, earning a bachelor's degree in 1975. In 1985, he received a master's degree for his thesis on property law in the medieval Statute of Budva.

He was later approved for a doctoral dissertation on hereditary law in fourteenth-century Kotor but was required to change his thesis due to the Yugoslav Wars of the 1990s and the resulting inaccessibility of some Montenegrin archives. He ultimately received a Ph.D. in the field of Roman law in 1999. He has published widely on the subject; his book Forum Romanum: Roman State, Law, Religion, and Myth received the Veselin Lučić Endowment Award for best scientific achievement by a University of Belgrade professor in 2005.

Bujuklić became an assistant trainee at the University of Belgrade Faculty of Law in 1978, an assistant in 1985, an assistant professor in 1999, and a full professor in 2014. At one time, Aleksandar Vučić was one of his students. He retired in 2018.

== Politician ==
In the 2022 Serbian parliamentary election, the Serbian Progressive Party reserved the lead positions on its Together We Can Do Everything electoral list for non-party cultural figures and academics. Bujuklić was given the fifth position on the list; this was tantamount to election, and he was indeed elected when the list won a plurality victory with 120 out of 250 mandates.

During his assembly term, he was a member of the education committee, (Note: Formally known as the Committee on Education, Science, Technological Development, and the Information Society.) the subcommittee on science and higher education, and the committee on constitutional and legislative issues; a deputy member of the committee on Kosovo-Metohija; the leader of Serbia's parliamentary friendship group with the Sovereign Order of Malta; and a member of the friendship group with Italy.

He was not a candidate in the 2023 parliamentary election, and his term ended when the new assembly convened in February 2024.
