= Živojin Rakočević =

Serbian journalist (born 1973)

- Живојин Ракочевић
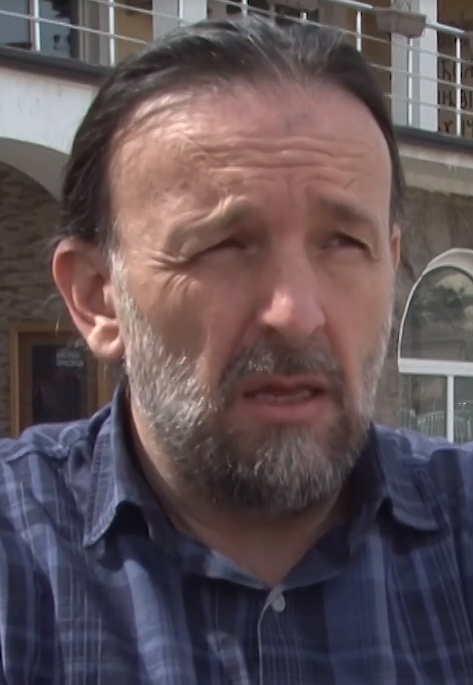
- Born: 1973 (age 52–53); Sela, SR Montenegro, SFR Yugoslavia
- Education: University of Priština; University of Belgrade
- Occupations: Journalist, writer, poet, publicist

Živojin Rakočević (Serbian Cyrillic: Живојин Ракочевић; born 1973) is a Serbian journalist, writer, poet and publicist.

== Biography ==
Rakočević was born in 1973 in the village of Sela, SR Montenegro, SFR Yugoslavia.

He graduated from the Faculty of Philology at the University of Priština and received his master's degree from the University of Belgrade.

He is the former editor-in-chief of KIM Radio and a former member of the Republic Broadcasting Agency from 2009 to 2014.

He was a board member of the Anti-Corruption Agency from 2018 to 2020. He has been writing for Politika for more than ten years.

He has been the director of the Gračanica Cultural Center since 2013.

He is a member of the management board of the Association of Journalists of Serbia (UNS) and was the vice president of UNS from 2009 to 2013. He is currently the president of UNS.

Together with Mitar Reljić, he visited and photographed numerous Serbian cemeteries, many of which were destroyed by planning, in the territory of Kosovo and Metohija. Reljić's book Serbian Cemeteries in Kosovo and Metohija: Destroyed Monumental and Linguistic Heritage was born out of that undertaking.

He published several books of poetry and publications. His poems have been published in national, regional and one American magazine.

== Publications ==
- Bogu dušu
- Žitije kamena
- Čekajući metastazu
- Pronađeno pozorište
- Povratak u katakombe
- Glad
- Nagrađeni zločin

== Awards ==
- "Brank's Award" of Matica Srpska
- "Milan Pantić" award for investigative journalism and courage in reporting on events related to the pogrom of Serbs on 17 March 2004
- University Award of Priština
- "Lazar Vučković" Award
- Award "Kondir of Kosovo girl".
- "Grigorije Božović" Award
- The "Seal of Herzeg Šćepan" Award
- Gran pri pro poet
