= Živorad Mišić =

Serbian footballer

Personal information
- Full name: Živorad Mišić
- Date of birth: 1 October 1986 (age 40)
- Place of birth: Požarevac, SFR Yugoslavia
- Height: 1.79 m (5 ft 10 1/2 in)
- Position: Forward

Team information
- Current team: Herzogenburg SC
- Number: 7

Senior career*
Years	Team	Apps	(Gls)
2004–2006	Bambi Braničevo		
2006–2009	VGSK		
2009–2011	Sloga Petrovac	43	(9)
2011–2014	Javor Ivanjica	46	(4)
2013	→ Sloga Petrovac (loan)	14	(1)
2014–2015	Sloga Petrovac	25	(0)
2016	SV Albania	24	(4)
2017–2018	Sieghartskirchen SV	20	(9)
2018–2021	USC Rohrbach	42	(17)
2021	Kottingbrunn	11	(2)
2022	Draßburg	5	(0)
2022–2023	ASK Bad Fischau-Brunn	21	(1)
2023–2024	USC Markersdorf	17	(6)
2024-	Herzogenburg SC	10	(0)
- * Club domestic league appearances and goals as of 30 December 2024

Živorad Mišić (Serbian Cyrillic: Живорад Мишић; born 1 October 1986) is a Serbian football forward.
