= Živko =

- Pronunciation: Serbo-Croatian: [ʒiʋko]
- Gender: Male
- Language: Serbo-Croatian

Origin
- Origin: South Slavic
- Meaning: živ (alive, living)

Other names
- Alternative spelling: Serbian Cyrillic: Живко
- Related names: Zhivko

Živko (Serbian Cyrillic: Живко) is a Serbian and Croatian masculine given name of Slavic origin. It is derived from the Slavic word živ, meaning "alive, living". The Bulgarian form of the name is Zhivko.

== Notable people with the name ==
=== Given name ===
- Živko Adamović (1923–1998), Serbian entomologist and artist
- Živko Andrijašević (born 1967), Montenegrin historian and writer
- Živko Anočić (born 1981), Croatian actor
- Živko Bertić (1875–1938), Croatian politician, lawyer and writer
- Živko Budimir (born 1962), Bosnian Croat politician
- Živko Čingo (1935–1987), Macedonian writer
- Živko Dabić (1777–1808), captain in the First Serbian Uprising
- Živko Gocić (born 1982), Serbian water polo player
- Živko Gvozdić (fl. 1903–1918), Serbian Chetnik commander
- Živko Jugović (1855―1908), Serbian painter
- Živko Ključe (born 1955), Croatian composer
- Živko Konstantinović Paraćinac (c. 1770–1809), revolutionary in the First Serbian Uprising
- Živko Kostadinović (born 1992), Swiss footballer
- Živko Kustić (1930–2014), Croatian journalist and writer
- Živko Lukić (1943–2015), Serbian footballer
- Živko Marković (born 1952), Serbian politician
- Živko Nikolić (1941–2001), Yugoslav and Montenegrin film director
- Živko Papaz (born 1968), Serbish paralympic sport shooter
- Živko Pavlović, Serbian icon painter
- Živko Popovski (1934–2007), Macedonian architect
- Živko Radišić (1937–2021), Bosnian Serb politician
- Živko Šibalić (born 1963), birth name of the Serbian bishop Teodosije
- Živko Slijepčević (born 1957), Serbian football manager and player
- Živko Stojsavljević (1900–1978), Serbian painter
- Živko Topalović (1886–1972), Yugoslav socialist politician
- Živko Vrcelj (born 1959), Serbian medical doctor and politician
- Živko Zalar (born 1948), Croatian cinematographer
- Živko Živković (born 1989), Serbian footballer

=== Surname ===
- Tomislav Živko (born 1988), Croatian footballer
- Žiga Živko (born 1995), Slovenian footballer

== See also ==
- Živkovac, village in Grocka municipality, Serbia
- Živkovci, village in Ljig municipality, Serbia
- Živkovo, village in Leskovac municipality, Serbia
- Živković Kosa, village in Vojnić municipality, Croatia
- Živković, South Slavic surname
