= Živković =

Živković (sometimes transliterated Zivkovic, Serbian Cyrillic: Живковић, pronounced [ʒǐːʋkoʋitɕ]) is a Croatian and Serbian surname derived from a masculine given name Živko.

It is the most common surname in the Šibenik-Knin County in Croatia, and among the most frequent ones in two other counties.

It may refer to:

- Aleksandar Živković (footballer, born 1912), who played 15 times for Yugoslavia
- Aleksandar Živković (footballer, born 1977), who played twice for FR Yugoslavia
- Andrija Živković (born 1996), Serbian footballer
- Bojan Živković (born 1981), Serbian footballer
- Bora Zivkovic (born 1974), Danish footballer
- Boris Živković (born 1975), Croatian footballer
- Borna Živković, Croatian basket player
- Bratislav Živković (footballer), born 1970
- Bratislav Živković (soldier), 1975-2025
- Danijel Živković (born 1987), Montenegrin politician
- Dejan Živković (footballer, born 1979), Serbian football striker
- Dejan Živković (footballer, born 1982), Serbian football midfielder
- Denis Zivkovic (born 1987), American tennis player
- Dobrosav Živković (born 1962), Serbian illustrator
- Dragoljub Živković (Serbian engineer), Serbian engineer and politician, born 1955
- Dragoljub Živković (Serbian philosopher), Serbian philosopher and politician, born 1937
- Đuro Živković (born 1975), Serbian composer
- Filip Živković (born 2006), Croatian footballer
- Ivan Živković (1947-2016), Serbian diplomat
- Ivana Živković, United Nations official; Croatian diplomat
- Jovan Živković (born 2006), Austrian football player
- Katarina Živković (born 1989), Serbian singer
- Ljubica Živković (1936–2017), Serbian chess player
- Marjan Živković (born 1973), Serbian football manager and player
- Marko Živković (born 1994), Serbian footballer
- Milenko Živković, Serbian composer
- Milorad Živković (born 1963), Bosnian politician
- Miloš Živković (footballer, born December 1984), Serbian football defender
- Miloš Živković (footballer, born 1985), Serbian football defender
- Miloš Živković (writer) (born 1974), Serbian author
- Miodrag Živković (politician), Montenegrin politician (Liberal Party of Montenegro), born 1957
- Miodrag Živković (sculptor), Serbian sculptor and university professor, 1928-2020
- Mirjana Živković (1935–2020), Serbian composer
- Mladen Živković (born 1989), Serbian footballer
- Moreno Živković (born 2004), Croatian footballer
- Nebojša Jovan Živković, Serbian composer
- Nenad Živković (born 1989), Serbian footballer
- Petar Živković (1879–1947), Prime Minister of the Kingdom of Yugoslavia
- Radivoje Živković (born 1950), Serbian basketball player
- Radmila Živković (1953-2024), Serbian actress
- Radule Živković (born 1990), Montenegrin footballer
- Ratka Živković (born 1975), Serbian footballer
- Richairo Živković (born 1996), Dutch footballer
- Sanja Živković, Serbian-Canadian film director
- Srđan Živković (born 1986), Serbian basketball player
- Stevan Živković (born 1988), Serbian kickboxer
- Tamara Živković (born 2000), Montenegrin singer
- Tibor Živković (1966–2013), Serbian historian
- Predrag Živković "Tozovac" (1936–2021), Serbian folk singer and composer
- Vasa Živković (1819–1891), Serbian poet, cleric, and patriot
- Vladan Živković (1941-2022), Yugoslav actor
- Zagorka Živković, Swedish composer
- Živko Živković (born 1989), Serbian footballer
- Zoran Živković (handballer) (born 1945), Serbian handball player and coach widely known under his nickname Tuta
- Zoran Živković (writer) (born 1948), Serbian writer
- Zoran Živković (politician) (born 1960), politician and former Prime Minister of Serbia
- Zoran Živković (footballer) (born 1967), Croatian international footballer
- Zvonko Živković (born 1959), Serbian footballer
