= 2013–14 Sevilla FC season =

107th season in existence of Sevilla FC

Sevilla
2013–14 season
- President: José María del Nido
- Head coach: Unai Emery
- Stadium: Ramón Sánchez Pizjuán
- La Liga: 5th
- Copa del Rey: Round of 32
- UEFA Europa League: Winners
- Top goalscorer: League: Kevin Gameiro (15); All: Carlos Bacca (21)
Home colours	Away colours	Third colours

The 2013–14 Spanish football season was Sevilla Fútbol Club's 13th consecutive season in La Liga.

== First team squad ==
Updated 16 October 2013

Note: Flags indicate national team as defined under FIFA eligibility rules; some limited exceptions apply. Players may hold more than one non-FIFA nationality.

No.	Pos.	Nation	Player
1	GK	ESP	Javi Varas
2	DF	ARG	Federico Fazio
3	DF	ESP	Fernando Navarro
5	DF	POR	Diogo Figueiras
6	DF	POR	Daniel Carriço (on loan from Reading)
7	MF	GER	Marko Marin (on loan from Chelsea)
8	MF	URU	Sebastián Cristóforo
9	FW	COL	Carlos Bacca
10	MF	ARG	Diego Perotti
11	MF	CRO	Ivan Rakitić (captain)
12	MF	ESP	Vicente Iborra
13	GK	POR	Beto
14	MF	CHI	Bryan Rabello
15	MF	GER	Piotr Trochowski

No.	Pos.	Nation	Player
16	FW	RUS	Denis Cheryshev (on loan from Real Madrid)
17	MF	ESP	Jairo Samperio
18	DF	FRA	Geoffrey Kondogbia
19	MF	ESP	José Antonio Reyes
20	MF	ESP	Vitolo
21	DF	ARG	Nicolás Pareja (on loan from Spartak Moscow)
22	MF	CMR	Stéphane Mbia (on loan from Queens Park Rangers)
23	DF	ESP	Coke
24	FW	ROU	Raul Rusescu
25	GK	ESP	Julián Cuesta
27	MF	ESP	Antonio Cotán
30	DF	ESP	Israel Puerto
32	DF	ESP	Alberto Moreno
—	FW	FRA	Kevin Gameiro

== Transfers ==
=== Summer 2013 ===
==== In ====
(substituted on) In (5 players)
Player	From	Fee
(Romania) Raul Rusescu	(Romania) Steaua București	Undisclosed
(Spain) Jairo	(Spain) Racing Santander	Free
(Colombia) Carlos Bacca	(Belgium) Club Brugge	€8,000,000
(France) Kevin Gameiro	(France) Paris Saint-Germain	€10,000,000
(Uruguay) Sebastián Cristóforo	(Uruguay) Peñarol	€2,250,000

==== Out ====
(substituted off) Out (6 players)
Player	New Team	Fee
(Spain) Jesús Navas	(England) Manchester City	€14,900,000
(Spain) Antonio Luna	(England) Aston Villa	€2,000,000
(Spain) Luis Alberto	(England) Liverpool	€8,000,000
(Spain) Álvaro Negredo	(England) Manchester City	€20,000,000
(Spain) José Campaña	(England) Crystal Palace	€2,000,000
(Chile) Gary Medel	(Wales) Cardiff City	€9,500,000
(France) Geoffrey Kondogbia	(France) Monaco	

==== Loans in ====
(substituted on) Loan in (5 player)
Player	From
(Germany) Marko Marin	(England) Chelsea
(Cameroon) Stéphane Mbia	(England) Queens Park Rangers

== Pre-season and friendlies ==
Win Draw Loss

20 July 2013 Copa EuroAmericana	Universidad Católica	0–2	Sevilla	Santiago de Chile
16:30			Marin 60'; Jairo 83'	Stadium: Estadio San Carlos de Apoquindo; Attendance: 15,000; Referee: Eduardo Gamboa (Chile)

23 July 2013 Copa EuroAmericana	Atlético Nacional	1–1 (4–3 p)	Sevilla	Medellín
19:30	Cárdenas 44'		Coke 65'	Stadium: Atanasio Girardot Sports Complex; Attendance: 20,000; Referee: Adrián Vélez (Colombia)
	Penalties
	Uribe (penalty scored); Arias (penalty missed); Nájera (penalty missed); Valencia (penalty scored); Guisao (penalty scored); Murillo (penalty scored)		(penalty scored) Rakitić; (penalty missed) Moreno; (penalty missed) Coke; (penalty scored) Jairo; (penalty scored) Bacca; (penalty missed) Cotán

26 July 2013 Copa EuroAmericana	Barcelona SC	1–3	Sevilla	Guayaquil
19:30	Caicedo 4' (pen.)		Pareja 72'; Jairo 79'; Bacca 86'	Stadium: Estadio Monumental; Attendance: 5,000; Referee: Víctor Hugo Carrillo (Peru)

== Competitions ==
=== La Liga ===
==== League table ====
Pos	Team	Pld	W	D	L	GF	GA	GD	Pts	Qualification or relegation
3	Real Madrid	38	27	6	5	104	38	+66	87 (Note: Barcelona finished ahead of Real Madrid on head-to-head points: Barcelona 2–1 Real Madrid, Real Madrid 3–4 Barcelona.)	Qualification for the Champions League group stage
4	Athletic Bilbao	38	20	10	8	66	39	+27	70	Qualification for the Champions League play-off round
5	Sevilla	38	18	9	11	69	52	+17	63	Qualification for the Europa League group stage (Note: Sevilla automatically qualified for the 2014–15 UEFA Europa League group stage as the defending champions; the berth through their league position was vacated.)
6	Villarreal	38	17	8	13	60	44	+16	59 (Note: Villarreal finished ahead of Real Sociedad on head-to-head points: Villarreal 5–1 Real Sociedad, Real Sociedad 1–2 Villarreal.)	Qualification for the Europa League play-off round (Note: Since both the 2013–14 Copa del Rey champions (Real Madrid) and runners-up (Barcelona) qualified for the 2014–15 UEFA Champions League, the 5th, 6th and 7th placed teams qualified for the group stage, play-off round and third qualifying round of the 2014–15 UEFA Europa League respectively.)
7	Real Sociedad	38	16	11	11	62	55	+7	59	Qualification for the Europa League third qualifying round

Source: La Liga, ESPN
Rules for classification: 1st points; 2nd head-to-head points;

==== Results summary ====
Overall								Home						Away					
Pld	W	D	L	GF	GA	GD	Pts	W	D	L	GF	GA	GD	W	D	L	GF	GA	GD
38	18	9	11	69	52	+17	63	11	4	4	40	21	+19	7	5	7	29	31	−2

Last updated: 18 May 2014.
Source: Competitive matches

==== Results by round ====
Round	1	2	3	4	5	6	7	8	9	10	11	12	13	14	15	16	17	18	19	20	21	22	23	24	25	26	27	28	29	30	31	32	33	34	35	36	37	38
Ground	H	A	H	A	A	H	A	H	A	H	A	H	A	H	A	H	A	H	A	A	H	A	H	H	A	H	A	H	A	H	A	H	A	H	A	H	A	H
Result	L	D	D	L	L	W	D	W	D	W	L	L	W	W	W	D	W	W	D	D	L	L	L	D	W	W	W	W	W	W	L	W	W	W	L	D	L	W
Position	14	12	15	19	20	15	13	12	11	11	11	14	11	8	8	7	7	7	7	7	7	7	7	7	7	7	7	7	5	5	5	5	5	5	5	5	5	4

Source: Competitive matches
A = Away; H = Home; W = Win; D = Draw; L = Loss

==== Matches ====
18 August 2013 1	Sevilla	1–3	Atlético Madrid	Seville
22:00 CEST (UTC+02:00)	Perotti 37', (yellow card) 44'; Kondogbia (yellow card) 50'; Coke (yellow card) 75'; Vitolo (yellow card) 86'	Report	Turan (yellow card) 2'; Costa 35', 79'; Gabi (yellow card) 49'; Miranda (yellow card) 56'; Óliver (yellow card) 66'; Rodríguez 90'	Stadium: Ramón Sánchez Pizjuán; Attendance: 30,000; Referee: Carlos Clos Gómez

25 August 2013 2	Levante	0–0	Sevilla	Valencia
20:00 CEST (UTC+02:00)	Navarro (yellow card) 34'; López (yellow card) 36'; Barral (yellow card) 39'	Report	Iborra (yellow card) 38'; Coke (yellow card) 44'; Rakitić (yellow card) 69'; Kondogbia (yellow card) 73'; Fazio (yellow card) 79'	Stadium: Ciutat de València; Attendance: 8,342; Referee: Fernando Teixeira Vitienes

1 September 2013 3	Sevilla	2–2	Málaga	Seville
20:00 CEST (UTC+02:00)	Mbia (yellow card) 31'; Gameiro 44', 71'; Cala (yellow card) 60'; Rakitić (yellow card) 74'	Report	Darder (yellow card) 17'; Sánchez (yellow card) 29'; Angeleri (yellow card) 34'; Morales 40'; Santa Cruz 68'	Stadium: Ramón Sánchez Pizjuán; Attendance: 35,000; Referee: Carlos del Cerro Grande

14 September 2013 4	Barcelona	3–2	Sevilla	Barcelona
20:00 CEST (UTC+02:00)	Alves 36'; Messi 75'; Adriano (yellow card) 88'; Sánchez 90+4'	Report	Vitolo (yellow card) 8'; Mbia (yellow card) 31'; Jairo (yellow card) 35'; Coke (yellow card) 49', (goal) 90'; Cala (yellow card) 64'; Rakitić 80'	Stadium: Camp Nou; Attendance: 79,000; Referee: César Muñiz Fernández (Asturias)

22 September 2013 5	Valencia	3–1	Sevilla	Valencia
12:00 CEST (UTC+02:00)	Jonas 32', 73', (yellow card) 38'; Ruiz 82'; Banega (yellow card) 90+1'	Report	Gameiro 52'; Cala (yellow card) 89'	Stadium: Mestalla; Attendance: 45,000; Referee: Alberto Undiano Mallenco

25 September 2013 6	Sevilla	4–1	Rayo Vallecano	Seville
20:00 CEST (UTC+02:00)	Rakitić 17' (pen.), 53'; Cala (yellow card) 45+1'; Marin (yellow card) 45+2' Trochowski (yellow card) 78'; Bacca 80', 88'	Report	Arbilla (yellow card) 16'; Gálvez (yellow card) 52' (yellow-red card) 66'; Adrián 55'; Saúl (yellow card) 56'; Mojica (yellow card) 69'; Viera (red card) 82'; Bangoura (yellow card) 87'	Stadium: Ramón Sánchez Pizjuán; Attendance: 30,000; Referee: Antonio Mateu Lahoz

28 September 2013 7	Real Sociedad	1–1	Sevilla	San Sebastián
20:00 CEST (UTC+02:00)	Griezmann 66'	Report	Figueiras (yellow card) 15'; Jairo 18'; Rakitić (yellow card) 55'; Cala (yellow card) 69' (yellow-red card) 85'; Cristóforo (yellow card) 74'; Moreno (yellow card) 74'	Stadium: Anoeta; Attendance: 28,000; Referee: Carlos Velasco Carballo

6 October 2013 8	Sevilla	2–1	Almería	Seville
12:00 CEST (UTC+02:00)	Gameiro 6'; Iborra (yellow card) 31'; Moreno (yellow card) 71'; Fazio (yellow card) 78'; Cristóforo (yellow card) 90+1'; Rakitić 90+3'	Report	Verza (yellow card) 13'; Rodri (yellow card) 20', (goal) 23'; Christian (yellow card) 52'; Suso (yellow card) 88'; Soriano (yellow card) 90+6'	Stadium: Ramón Sánchez Pizjuán; Attendance: 31,123; Referee: Ignacio Iglesias Villanueva

20 October 2013 9	Valladolid	2–2	Sevilla	Valladolid
18:00 CEST (UTC+02:00)	Rossi (yellow card) 21'; Manucho 82'; Ebert 84', (yellow card) 90+2'	Report	Bacca 2', (yellow card) 54'; Cala (yellow card) 5'; Moreno 31'; Carriço (yellow card) 35'	Stadium: José Zorrilla; Attendance: – Referee: Eduardo Prieto Iglesias

27 October 2013 10	Sevilla	2–1	Osasuna	Seville
12:00 CEST (UTC+02:00)	Rakitić (yellow card) 33', (goal) 55'; Jairo 75'	Report	Silva (yellow card) 11'; Damià (red card) 34'; Puñal (yellow card) 64'; Oier (yellow card) 84'; Riera 87', (yellow card) 88'	Stadium: Ramón Sánchez Pizjuán; Attendance: 25,000; Referee: José González González

30 October 2013 11	Real Madrid	7–3	Sevilla	Madrid
22:00 CET (UTC+01:00)	Bale 13', 27'; Ronaldo 32' (pen.), 60', 71'; Ramos (yellow card) 37'; Benzema 53', 80'; Arbeloa (yellow card) 65'; Khedira (yellow card) 66'	Report	Moreno (yellow card) 25'; Rakitić 38' (pen.), 63'; Bacca 40'; Mbia (yellow card) 59' (yellow-red card) 76'; Perotti (yellow card) 90+3'	Stadium: Santiago Bernabéu; Attendance: 70,000; Referee: José Teixeira Vitienes (Cantabria)

4 November 2013 12	Sevilla	0–1	Celta Vigo	Seville
22:00 CET (UTC+01:00)	Mbia (yellow card) 28'; Figueiras (yellow card) 45'	Report	López 47'; Toni (yellow card) 90+2'	Stadium: Ramón Sánchez Pizjuán; Attendance: 32,000; Referee: Juan Martínez Munuera

10 November 2013 13	Espanyol	1–3	Sevilla	Cornellà de Llobregat
12:00 CET (UTC+01:00)	García 23'; Sidnei (yellow card) 28'; López (yellow card) 79'; Sánchez (yellow card) 82' (yellow-red card) 85'	Report	Fazio 3'; Vitolo 10'; Pareja (yellow card) 12'; Bacca 58'; Cristóforo (yellow card) 75'; Iborra (yellow card) 88'	Stadium: Cornellà-El Prat; Attendance: 21,000; Referee: Miguel Ayza Gámez

23 November 2013 14	Sevilla	4–0	Betis	Seville
21:00 CET (UTC+01:00)	Bacca 2'; Mbia 43'; Vitolo 59'; Iborra 88'	Report	Vadillo (yellow card) 34'; Paulão (yellow card) 36' (yellow-red card) 42'; Nono (yellow card) 45+2'; Torres (yellow card) 51'; Matilla (yellow card) 90+2'	Stadium: Ramón Sánchez Pizjuán; Attendance: 40,150; Referee: Javier Estrada Fernández

1 December 2013 15	Granada	1–2	Sevilla	Granada
17:00 CET (UTC+01:00)	Rico (yellow card) 16'; Brahimi 61' (pen.); Yebda (yellow card) 80'; Buonanotte (yellow card) 84'; Ighalo (yellow card) 90'	Report	Bacca 23'; Carriço (yellow card) 25'; Mbia (yellow card) 29'; Rakitić (yellow card) 57'; Jairo (yellow card) 59'; Iborra (yellow card) 60'; Figueiras (yellow card) 82'; Gameiro 87', (yellow card) 90'	Stadium: Los Cármenes; Attendance: 18,000; Referee: Carlos del Cerro Grande

14 December 2013 16	Sevilla	1–1	Athletic Bilbao	Seville
19:00 CET (UTC+01:00)	Moreno 4'; Figueiras (yellow card) 34'; Bacca (yellow card) 45+1'; Vitolo (yellow card) 55'; Mbia (yellow card) 89'	Report	Susaeta 6'; Gurpegui (yellow card) 38'	Stadium: Ramón Sánchez Pizjuán; Attendance: 31,456; Referee: Alberto Undiano Mallenco

21 December 2013 17	Villarreal	1–2	Sevilla	Villarreal
16:00 CET (UTC+01:00)	Costa (yellow card) 55'; Gabriel (yellow card) 58'; Perbet 88' (pen.); Pereira (yellow card) 90+2'	Report	Cala 24', (red card) 86'; Carriço (yellow card) 51'; Coke (yellow card) 69'; Bacca 71'; Iborra (yellow card) 76'; Beto (yellow card) 90'	Stadium: El Madrigal; Attendance: 20,000; Referee: Jesús Gil Manzano

4 January 2014 18	Sevilla	3–0	Getafe	Seville
12:00 CET (UTC+01:00)	Rakitić (yellow card) 22', (goal) 77'; Vitolo 34'; Bacca 55'; Navarro (yellow card) 61'	Report	Arroyo (yellow card) 55'; López (yellow card) 90'	Stadium: Ramón Sánchez Pizjuán; Attendance: 28,914; Referee: Miguel Ayza Gámez

12 January 2014 19	Elche	1–1	Sevilla	Elche
22:00 CET (UTC+01:00)	Pelegrín (yellow card) 39'; Gil (yellow card) 54'; Herrera 82'	Report	Iborra (yellow card) 36'; Carriço (yellow card) 40', (goal) 89'; Reyes (yellow card) 85'	Stadium: Manuel Martínez Valero; Attendance: 20,014; Referee: Alfonso Álvarez Izquierdo

19 January 2014 20	Atlético Madrid	1–1	Sevilla	Madrid
21:00 CET (UTC+01:00)	Villa 18'; Juanfran (yellow card) 71'; Gabi (yellow card) 72'	Report	Pareja (yellow card) 13'; Rakitić 73' (pen.), (yellow card) 90'; Moreno (red card) 89'	Stadium: Vicente Calderón; Attendance: 45,000; Referee: José Hernández Hernández

25 January 2014 21	Sevilla	2–3	Levante	Seville
22:00 CET (UTC+01:00)	Coke 25'; Carriço (yellow card) 39'; Rakitić 68'; Pareja (yellow card) 74'; Fazio (yellow card) 87'; Jairo (red card) 90+2'	Report	Barral 30' (pen.); Vyntra (yellow card) 32', (goal) 71'; Simão (yellow card) 43', (goal) 75'; El Zhar (yellow card) 88'; Karabelas (red card) 90+1'	Stadium: Ramón Sánchez Pizjuán; Attendance: 31,000; Referee: Teixeira Vitienes

1 February 2014 22	Málaga	3–2	Sevilla	Málaga
22:00 CET (UTC+01:00)	Duda 31' (pen.), 83', (yellow card) 83'; Antunes (yellow card) 41'; Eliseu (yellow card) 45'; Samu 77'; Sánchez (yellow card) 90+2'	Report	Coke (yellow card) 29'; Moreno (yellow card) 34'; Vitolo (yellow card) 36'; Bacca 49', (yellow card) 78'; Fazio 66'; Iborra (yellow card) 76'	Stadium: La Rosaleda; Attendance: 30,377; Referee: José González González

9 February 2014 23	Sevilla	1–4	Barcelona	Seville
21:00 CET (UTC+01:00)	Moreno 15'; Carriço (yellow card) 39'; Figueiras (yellow card) 70'; Cheryshev (yellow card) 71'	Report	Song (yellow card) 20'; Sánchez 34'; Messi 44', 56'; July (yellow card) 59'; Valdés (yellow card) 68'; Fàbregas 88'	Stadium: Ramón Sánchez Pizjuán; Attendance: 27,500; Referee: José Teixeira Vitienes

16 February 2014 24	Sevilla	0–0	Valencia	Seville
21:00 CET (UTC+01:00)	Coke (yellow card) 19'; Vitolo (yellow card) 58'; Cheryshev (yellow card) 69' (yellow-red card) 90+3'	Report	Costa (yellow card) 41' (yellow-red card) 50'; Bernat (yellow card) 62'; Senderos (yellow card) 62'; Parejo (yellow card) 64'; Vargas (yellow card) 77'; Alves (yellow card) 90+1'	Stadium: Ramón Sánchez Pizjuán; Attendance: 26,500; Referee: Alfonso Álvarez Izquierdo

23 February 2014 25	Rayo Vallecano	0–1	Sevilla	Madrid
12:00 CET (UTC+01:00)	Falque (yellow card) 43'; Saúl (yellow card) 65'	Report	Fazio (yellow card) 24'; Iborra (yellow card) 36' (yellow-red card) 83'; Coke 57'	Stadium: Vallecas; Attendance: 13,800; Referee: Carlos Delgado Ferreiro

2 March 2014 26	Sevilla	1–0	Real Sociedad	Seville
19:00 CET (UTC+01:00)	Gameiro 77'	Report	Zaldúa (yellow card) 7'; José Ángel (yellow card) 56'; I. Martínez (yellow card) 60'; Griezmann (yellow card) 66'	Stadium: Ramón Sánchez Pizjuán; Attendance: 35,000; Referee: José Hernández Hernández

9 March 2014 27	Almería	1–3	Sevilla	Almería
17:00 CET (UTC+01:00)	Dubarbier (yellow card) 38'; Rodri (yellow card) 44'; Vidal 84'	Report	Navarro (yellow card) 16'; Bacca 31'; Reyes (yellow card) 45'; Carriço 51'; Figueiras (yellow card) 65'; Gameiro 76'; Beto (yellow card) 86'	Stadium: Mediterráneo; Attendance: 15,000; Referee: Carlos Clos Gómez

16 March 2014 28	Sevilla	4–1	Real Valladolid	Seville
19:00 CET (UTC+01:00)	Rakitić 23' (pen.); Gameiro 41', 66' (pen.); Figueiras 74', (yellow card) 79'; Reyes (yellow card) 86'; Bacca (yellow card) 90+2'	Report	Bergdich (yellow card) 7'; Valiente (yellow card) 51'; Guerra 76'; Rukavina (yellow card) 89'	Stadium: Ramón Sánchez Pizjuán; Attendance: 39,700; Referee: Carlos Velasco Carballo

23 March 2014 29	Osasuna	1–2	Sevilla	Pamplona
12:00 CET (UTC+01:00)	Cejudo (yellow card) 39'; Armenteros (yellow card) 74'; Silva (yellow card) 88'; Acuña 90+4'	Report	Jairo 27'; Bacca 45+1' (pen.)	Stadium: El Sadar; Attendance: 18,000; Referee: Alfonso Álvarez Izquierdo

26 March 2014 30	Sevilla	2–1	Real Madrid	Seville
22:00 CET (UTC+01:00)	Bacca 19', 72'; Iborra (yellow card) 21'; Marin (yellow card) 61'	Report	Ronaldo 14'; Bale (yellow card) 23'; Varane (yellow card) 78'; Alonso (yellow card) 87'	Stadium: Ramón Sánchez Pizjuán; Attendance: 38,100; Referee: José González González

29 March 2014 31	Celta Vigo	1–0	Sevilla	Vigo
18:00 CEST (UTC+02:00)	Fontàs (yellow card) 25'; Nolito 87' (pen.)	Report	Gameiro (yellow card) 79'; Fazio (yellow card) 85'; Iborra (yellow card) 85'; Jairo (yellow card) 89'	Stadium: Balaídos; Attendance: 19,500; Referee: José González González

6 April 2014 32	Sevilla	4–1	Espanyol	Seville
19:00 CEST (UTC+02:00)	Mbia 18', (yellow card) 51'; Gameiro 44', 84'; Fazio (yellow card) 46'; Figueiras (yellow card) 60'; Rakitić 89'	Report	D. López (yellow card) 40'; García 47' (pen.)	Stadium: Ramón Sánchez Pizjuán; Attendance: 33,600; Referee: Carlos del Cerro Grande

13 April 2014 33	Betis	0–2	Sevilla	Seville
12:00 CEST (UTC+02:00)	N'Diaye (yellow card) 5'; Juan Carlos (red card) 27'; Castro (yellow card) 31'; Baptistão (yellow card) 57'; Chica (yellow card) 61'	Report	Trochowski (yellow card) 13'; Gameiro 30' (pen.), 82'; Reyes (yellow card) 34'; Vitolo (yellow card) 55'; Navarro (yellow card) 69'	Stadium: Benito Villamarín; Attendance: 32,254; Referee: Carlos Velasco Carballo

20 April 2014 34	Sevilla	4–0	Granada	Seville
19:00 CEST (UTC+02:00)	Carriço (yellow card) 10'; Mainz 14' (o.g.); Gameiro 51'; Mbia 58'; Vitolo 68'; Navarro (yellow card) 79'	Report		Stadium: Ramón Sánchez Pizjuán; Attendance: 27,000; Referee: José Teixeira Vitienes

27 April 2014 35	Athletic Bilbao	3–1	Sevilla	Bilbao
19:00 CEST (UTC+02:00)	Susaeta 4'; Muniain 53', (yellow card) 63'; Herrera 73'; Toquero (yellow card) 89'	Report	Pareja (yellow card) 22'; Iborra (yellow card) 29'; Figueiras (yellow card) 32' (yellow-red card) 72'; Carriço (yellow card) 45'; Gameiro 79'	Stadium: San Mamés; Attendance: 35,630; Referee: Alfonso Álvarez Izquierdo

4 May 2014 36	Sevilla	0–0	Villarreal	Seville
19:00 CEST (UTC+02:00)		Report		Stadium: Ramón Sánchez Pizjuán; Attendance: 33,000; Referee: Eduardo Prieto Iglesias

11 May 2014 37	Getafe	1–0	Sevilla	Getafe
19:00 CEST (UTC+02:00)	Escudero (yellow card) 69', (goal) 70'; Lacen (yellow card) 73'; Castro (yellow card) 79'	Report	Fazio (yellow card) 12'; Navarro (yellow card) 20'	Stadium: Coliseum Alfonso Pérez; Attendance: 8,000; Referee: Javier Estrada Fernández

18 May 2014 38	Sevilla	3–1	Elche	Seville
21:00 CEST (UTC+02:00)	Iborra 16', 72', (yellow card) 75'; Cotán (yellow card) 40'; Jairo 61'	Report	Mantecón (yellow card) 73'; Boakye 90+2'	Stadium: Ramón Sánchez Pizjuán; Attendance: 36,300; Referee: José Hernández Hernández (Las Palmas)

=== Copa del Rey ===
==== Round of 32 ====
6 December 2013 First leg	Racing Santander	0–1	Sevilla	Santander
20:00 CET (UTC+01:00)	Barrio (yellow card) 51'; Miguélez (yellow card) 69'; Soria (yellow card) 88'		Jairo 5'; Iborra (yellow card) 28'; Cala (yellow card) 50' (yellow-red card) 52'; Coke (yellow card) 52'; Cristóforo (yellow card) 64'	Stadium: El Sardinero; Attendance: 5,000; Referee: Ignacio Iglesias Villanueva (Galicia)

18 December 2013 Second leg	Sevilla	0–2 (1–2 agg.)	Racing Santander	Seville
21:30 CET (UTC+01:00)	Mbia (red card) 62'; Figueiras (yellow card) 72'; Rusescu (yellow card) 73'; Cala (yellow card) 83'		Miguélez 63' (pen.); Koné (yellow card) 79', (goal) 90'	Stadium: Ramón Sánchez Pizjuán

=== UEFA Europa League ===
==== Third qualifying round ====
1 August 2013 First leg	Sevilla (Spain)	3–0	(Montenegro) Mladost Podgorica	Seville, Spain
21:30 CEST (UTC+02:00)	Bacca 18'; Perotti 82' (pen.); Carriço 90+1'	Report	Mitrović (yellow card) 12'; Živković (yellow card) 71'; Šofranac (yellow card) 81'	Stadium: Ramón Sánchez Pizjuán; Attendance: 27,548; Referee: Slavko Vinčić (Slovenia)

8 August 2013 Second leg	Mladost Podgorica (Montenegro)	1–6 (1–9 agg.)	(Spain) Sevilla	Podgorica, Montenegro
20:30 CEST (UTC+02:00)	Pavićević 90+1'	Report	Vitolo 10'; Rusescu 23', 39'; Rabello 33'; Coke 37', 60', (yellow card) 79'	Stadium: Podgorica City Stadium; Attendance: 3,500; Referee: Yevhen Aranovskiy (Ukraine)

==== Play-off round ====
22 August 2013 First leg	Sevilla (Spain)	4–1	(Poland) Śląsk Wrocław	Seville, Spain
21:30 CEST (UTC+02:00)	Jairo (yellow card) 26'; Marin (yellow card) 33', (goal) 67', 89'; Rakitić 36'; Figueiras (yellow card) 75'; Gameiro 85'	Report	Paixão 16', (yellow card) 27'; Stevanović (yellow card) 35'; Plaku (yellow card) 49'; Dudu (red card) 55'; Spahić (yellow card) 90+3'	Stadium: Ramón Sánchez Pizjuán; Attendance: 16,758; Referee: Manuel Gräfe (Germany)

29 August 2013 Second leg	Śląsk Wrocław (Poland)	0–5 (1–9 agg.)	(Spain) Sevilla	Wrocław, Poland
20:45 CEST (UTC+02:00)	Kokoszka (yellow card) 80'; Plaku (yellow card) 89'	Report	Rakitić 22'; Bacca 38', 87'; Jairo 71'; Perotti 78'	Stadium: Stadion Miejski; Attendance: 41,955; Referee: Fırat Aydınus (Turkey)

==== Group stage ====
Pos	Team	Pld	W	D	L	GF	GA	GD	Pts	Qualification	SEV	SLO	FRE	EST
1	(Spain) Sevilla	6	3	3	0	9	4	+5	12	Advance to knockout phase	—	1–1	2–0	1–1
2	(Czech Republic) Slovan Liberec	6	2	3	1	9	8	+1	9	Advance to knockout phase	1–1	—	1–2	2–1
3	(Germany) SC Freiburg	6	1	3	2	5	8	−3	6		0–2	2–2	—	1–1
4	(Portugal) Estoril	6	0	3	3	5	8	−3	3		1–2	1–2	0–0	—

Source: Soccerway

19 September 2013 1	Estoril (Portugal)	1–2	(Spain) Sevilla	Estoril, Portugal
21:05 CEST (UTC+02:00)	Babanco (yellow card) 29'; Evandro (yellow card) 39'; Bruno Miguel 61'	Report	Mbia (yellow card) 39'; Vitolo 59'; Gameiro 77'	Stadium: Estádio António Coimbra da Mota; Attendance: 4,154; Referee: Alon Yefet (Israel)

3 October 2013 2	Sevilla (Spain)	2–0	(Germany) Freiburg	Seville, Spain
19:00 CEST (UTC+02:00)	Iborra (yellow card) 55'; Perotti 63' (pen.), (yellow card) 64'; Bacca 90+1'	Report	Diagne (yellow card) 56' (red card) 62'	Stadium: Ramón Sánchez Pizjuán; Attendance: 17,041; Referee: Vladislav Bezborodov (Russia)

24 October 2013 3	Slovan Liberec (Czech Republic)	1–1	(Spain) Sevilla	Liberec, Czech Republic
19:00 CEST (UTC+02:00)	Rabušic 20'; Pevalka (yellow card) 65'; Kovář (red card) 78'; Kušnír (yellow card) 80'	Report	Coke (yellow card) 42'; Moreno (yellow card) 76'; Vitolo 88'	Stadium: Stadion u Nisy; Attendance: 7,700; Referee: Mike Dean (England)

7 November 2013 4	Sevilla (Spain)	1–1	(Czech Republic) Slovan Liberec	Seville, Spain
21:05 CET (UTC+01:00)	Cala (yellow card) 22'; Perotti 29'; Cristóforo (yellow card) 45+2'; Mbia (yellow card) 90+3'	Report	Frýdek (yellow card) 10'; Kováč (yellow card) 28'; Pavelka 71'; Sackey (yellow card) 77'; Šural (yellow card) 90+2'	Stadium: Ramón Sánchez Pizjuán; Attendance: 15,178; Referee: Szymon Marciniak (Poland)

28 November 2013 5	Sevilla (Spain)	1–1	(Portugal) Estoril	Seville, Spain
19:00 CET (UTC+01:00)	Gameiro 7'; Moreno (yellow card) 48'; Fazio (yellow card) 57'; Iborra (yellow card) 90+3'	Report	Sebá (yellow card) 50'; Fernandes 90'	Stadium: Ramón Sánchez Pizjuán; Attendance: 12,557; Referee: Anastasios Sidiropoulos (Greece)

12 December 2013 6	Freiburg (Germany)	0–2	(Spain) Sevilla	Freiburg im Breisgau, Germany
21:05 CET (UTC+01:00)	Darida (yellow card) 13'; Höfler (yellow card) 60'	Report	Cala (yellow card) 25'; Iborra 40'; Jairo (yellow card) 70'; Navarro (yellow card) 72'; Bacca (yellow card) 73'; Rusescu 90+4', (yellow card) 90+4'	Stadium: Mage Solar Stadion; Attendance: 15,700; Referee: Tony Chapron (France)

==== Knockout phase ====
===== Round of 32 =====
20 February 2014 First leg	Maribor (Slovenia)	2–2	(Spain) Sevilla	Maribor, Slovenia
21:05 CET (UTC+01:00)	Tavares 33'; Bohar (yellow card) 42'; Vršič 81'; Cvijanović (yellow card) 90+1'	Report	Pareja (yellow card) 44'; Gameiro 47'; Fazio (yellow card) 56', (goal) 72'; Carriço (yellow card) 62'	Stadium: Ljudski vrt Attendance: 12,700; Referee: István Vad (Hungary)

27 February 2014 Second leg	Sevilla (Spain)	2–1 (4–3 agg.)	(Slovenia) Maribor	Seville, Spain
19:00 CET (UTC+01:00)	Reyes 42'; Gameiro 59'	Report	Mezga (yellow card) 49'; Cvijanović (yellow card) 69'; Filipović (yellow card) 85'; Vršič 90+2'	Stadium: Ramón Sánchez Pizjuán; Attendance: 21,562; Referee: Luca Banti (Italy)

===== Round of 16 =====
13 March 2014 First leg	Sevilla (Spain)	0–2	(Spain) Betis	Seville, Spain
21:05 CET (UTC+01:00)	Iborra (yellow card) 26'; Figueiras (yellow card) 90+6'	Report	Cedrick (yellow card) 13'; Baptistão 15'; Caro (yellow card) 28'; Jordi (yellow card) 51'; Adán (yellow card) 72'; Sevilla 77'	Stadium: Ramón Sánchez Pizjuán; Attendance: 35,506; Referee: Cüneyt Çakır (Turkey)

20 March 2014 Second leg	Betis (Spain)	0–2 (a.e.t.) (2–2 agg.) (3–4 p)	(Spain) Sevilla	Seville, Spain
21:05 CET (UTC+01:00)	Nono (yellow card) 31'; Jordi (yellow card) 75'	Report	Mbia (yellow card) 19'; Reyes 20'; Figueiras (yellow card) 45'; Bacca 75'; Coke (yellow card) 89'; Fazio (yellow card) 90+4'; Jairo (yellow card) 105+1'	Stadium: Benito Villamarín; Attendance: 48,000; Referee: Pedro Proença (Portugal)
	Penalties
	Castro (penalty scored); Sevilla (penalty scored); Amaya (penalty scored); N'Diaye (penalty missed); Nono (penalty missed)		(penalty missed) Vitolo; (penalty scored) Coke; (penalty scored) Gameiro; (penalty scored) Moreno; (penalty scored) Rakitić

===== Quarter-finals =====
3 April 2014 First leg	Porto (Portugal)	1–0	(Spain) Sevilla	Porto, Portugal
21:05 CEST (UTC+02:00)	Mangala 31'; Martínez (yellow card) 43'; Fernando (yellow card) 87' (yellow-red card) 87'	Report	Moreno (yellow card) 15'; Reyes (yellow card) 69'	Stadium: Estádio do Dragão; Attendance: 31,122; Referee: Wolfgang Stark (Germany)

10 April 2014 Second leg	Sevilla (Spain)	4–1 (4–2 agg.)	(Portugal) Porto	Seville, Spain
21:05 CEST (UTC+02:00)	Rakitić 5' (pen.); Vitolo 26'; Bacca 29', (yellow card) 66'; Coke (yellow card) 32' (yellow-red card) 54'; Gameiro 79'	Report	Mangala (yellow card) 29'; Danilo (yellow card) 29'; Varela (yellow card) 31'; Quaresma (yellow card) 32', (goal) 90+2'; Ricardo (yellow card) 75'	Stadium: Ramón Sánchez Pizjuán; Attendance: 31,422; Referee: Gianluca Rocchi (Italy)

===== Semi-finals =====
24 April 2014 First leg	Sevilla (Spain)	2–0	(Spain) Valencia	Seville, Spain
21:05 CEST (UTC+02:00)	Mbia 33'; Bacca 36'; Marin (yellow card) 71'	Report	Alcácer (yellow card) 89'; Mathieu (yellow card) 90+2'	Stadium: Ramón Sánchez Pizjuán; Attendance: 33,496; Referee: Damir Skomina (Slovenia)

1 May 2014 Second leg	Valencia (Spain)	3–1 (3–3(a) agg.)	(Spain) Sevilla	Valencia, Spain
21:05 CEST (UTC+02:00)	Feghouli 14', (yellow card) 73'; Beto 26' (o.g.); Bernat (yellow card) 53'; Mathieu 69', (yellow card) 90+3'; Alves (yellow card) 82'	Report	Carriço (yellow card) 86'; Mbia 90+4'; Jairo (yellow card) 90+4'	Stadium: Mestalla; Attendance: 45,938; Referee: Milorad Mažić (Serbia)

===== Final =====
14 May 2014 Final	Sevilla (Spain)	0–0 (a.e.t.) (4–2 p)	(Portugal) Benfica	Turin, Italy
20:45 CEST (UTC+02:00)	Fazio (yellow card) 11'; Moreno (yellow card) 13'; Coke (yellow card) 98'	Report	Siqueira (yellow card) 30'; Almeida (yellow card) 100'	Stadium: Juventus Stadium; Attendance: 33,120; Referee: Felix Brych (Germany)
	Penalties
	Bacca (penalty scored); Mbia (penalty scored); Coke (penalty scored); Gameiro (penalty scored)		(penalty scored) Lima; (penalty missed) Cardozo; (penalty missed) Rodrigo; (penalty scored) Luisão

== Statistics ==
=== Appearances and goals ===
Last updated on 14 May 2014

No.	Pos	Nat	Player	Total		La Liga		Copa del Rey		Europa League	
No.	Pos	Nat	Player	Apps	Goals	Apps	Goals	Apps	Goals	Apps	Goals
Goalkeepers
1	GK	(Spain) ESP	Javi Varas	17	0	5+1	0	2	0	9	0
13	GK	(Portugal) POR	Beto	43	0	33	0	0	0	10	0
25	GK	(Spain) ESP	Julián Cuesta	0	0	0	0	0	0	0	0
Defenders
2	DF	(Argentina) ARG	Federico Fazio	41	3	27	2	1	0	12+1	1
3	DF	(Spain) ESP	Fernando Navarro	39	0	21+3	0	1+1	0	13	0
5	DF	(Portugal) POR	Diogo Figueiras	35	1	19+3	1	1	0	8+4	0
6	DF	(Portugal) POR	Daniel Carriço	31	3	22	2	0	0	9	1
21	DF	(Argentina) ARG	Nicolás Pareja	37	0	23+2	0	0	0	12	0
23	DF	(Spain) ESP	Coke	38	5	23+2	3	1	0	11+1	2
30	DF	(Spain) ESP	Israel Puerto	4	0	0+3	0	0	0	0+1	0
31	DF	(Spain) ESP	Moi	2	0	1+1	0	0	0	0	0
32	DF	(Spain) ESP	Alberto Moreno	44	3	27+2	3	1	0	11+3	0
Midfielders
7	MF	(Germany) GER	Marko Marin	30	2	10+8	0	0	0	4+8	2
8	MF	(Uruguay) URU	Sebastián Cristóforo	21	0	4+8	0	2	0	6+1	0
11	MF	(Croatia) CRO	Ivan Rakitić	52	15	29+5	12	0	0	16+2	3
12	MF	(Spain) ESP	Vicente Iborra	36	4	25+2	3	2	0	5+2	1
15	MF	(Germany) GER	Piotr Trochowski	15	0	9	0	1	0	2+3	0
17	MF	(Spain) ESP	Jairo Samperio	36	6	16+9	4	2	1	5+4	1
19	MF	(Spain) ESP	José Antonio Reyes	34	2	15+6	0	0+1	0	12	2
20	MF	(Spain) ESP	Vitolo	45	8	25+4	4	0	0	11+5	4
22	MF	(Cameroon) CMR	Stéphane Mbia	29	5	18+1	3	1+1	0	8	2
27	MF	(Spain) ESP	Antonio Cotán	4	0	2	0	0	0	0+2	0
Forwards
9	FW	(Colombia) COL	Carlos Bacca	52	21	27+8	14	0+1	0	12+4	7
16	FW	(Russia) RUS	Denis Cheryshev	5	0	1+3	0	0	0	1	0
18	FW	(France) FRA	Kevin Gameiro	49	21	20+15	15	1	0	6+7	6
33	FW	(Spain) ESP	Carlos Fernández	5	0	2+2	0	0+1	0	0	0
Players who have made an appearance this season but have left the club
4	DF	(Spain) ESP	Cala	19	1	9	1	2	0	8	0
10	MF	(Argentina) ARG	Diego Perotti	19	5	3+7	1	1	0	5+3	4
12	MF	(Netherlands) NED	Hedwiges Maduro	1	0	0	0	0	0	1	0
14	MF	(Chile) CHI	Bryan Rabello	15	1	2+4	0	1	0	7+1	1
22	MF	(Central African Republic) CAF	Geoffrey Kondogbia	3	0	0+2	0	0	0	1	0
24	FW	(Romania) ROU	Raul Rusescu	7	3	0+1	0	2	0	2+2	3
