= List of academic journals published in Serbia =

This is a list of academic journals published in Serbia.

- Acta Entomologica Serbica
- Balcanica
- Belgrade Law Review
- Journal of Graphic Engineering and Design
- Metallurgical and Materials Engineering
- Journal of Mining and Metallurgy, Section B: Metallurgy
- Philotheos: International Journal for Philosophy and Theology
- Psihijatrija danas
- Serbian Astronomical Journal
- Sociološki pregled

== See also ==
- List of Serbian-language journals
