= Astromundus =

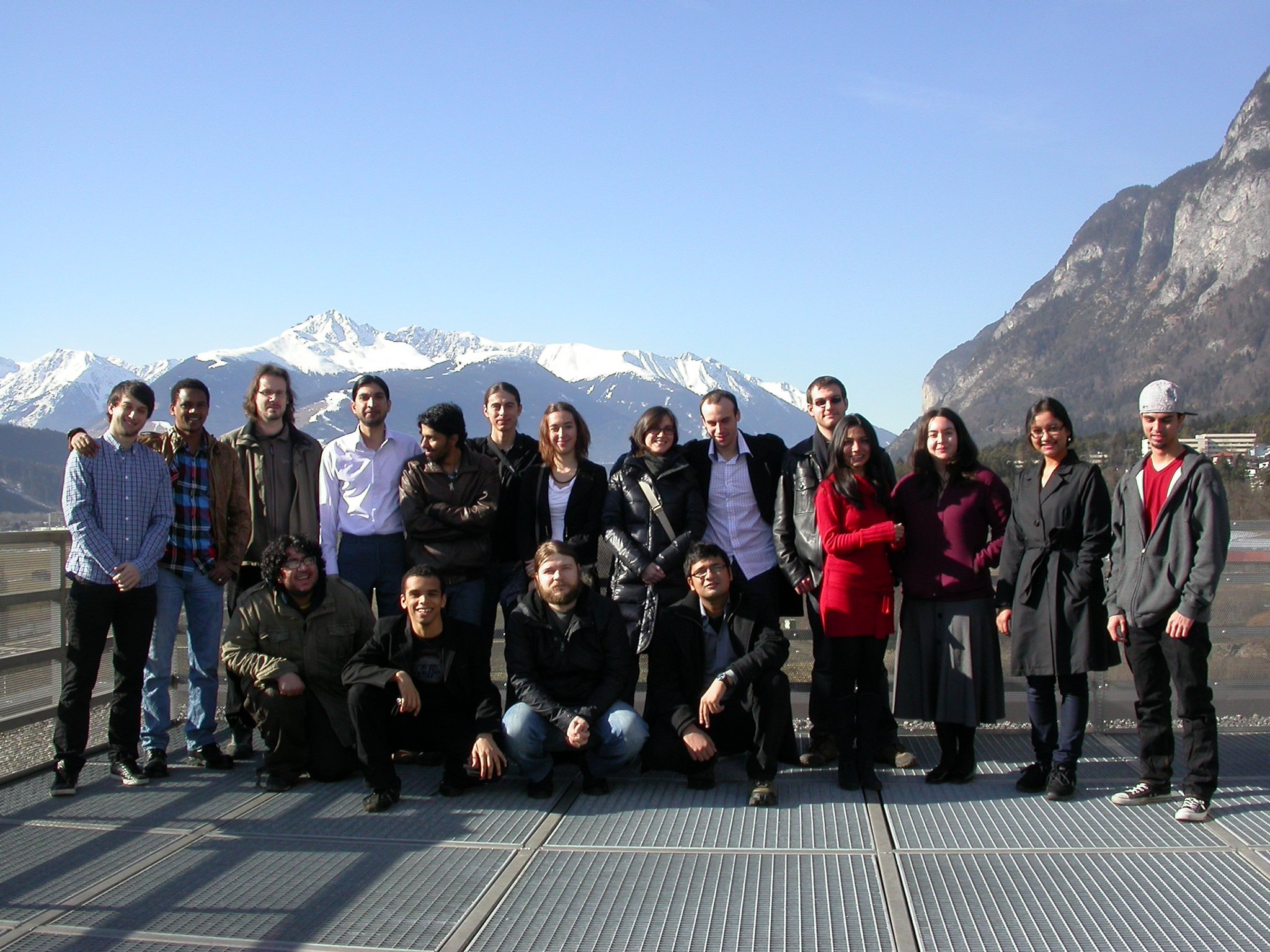
Students and tutors on the roof of Victor Franz Hess Haus, farewell from Innsbruck, 2011

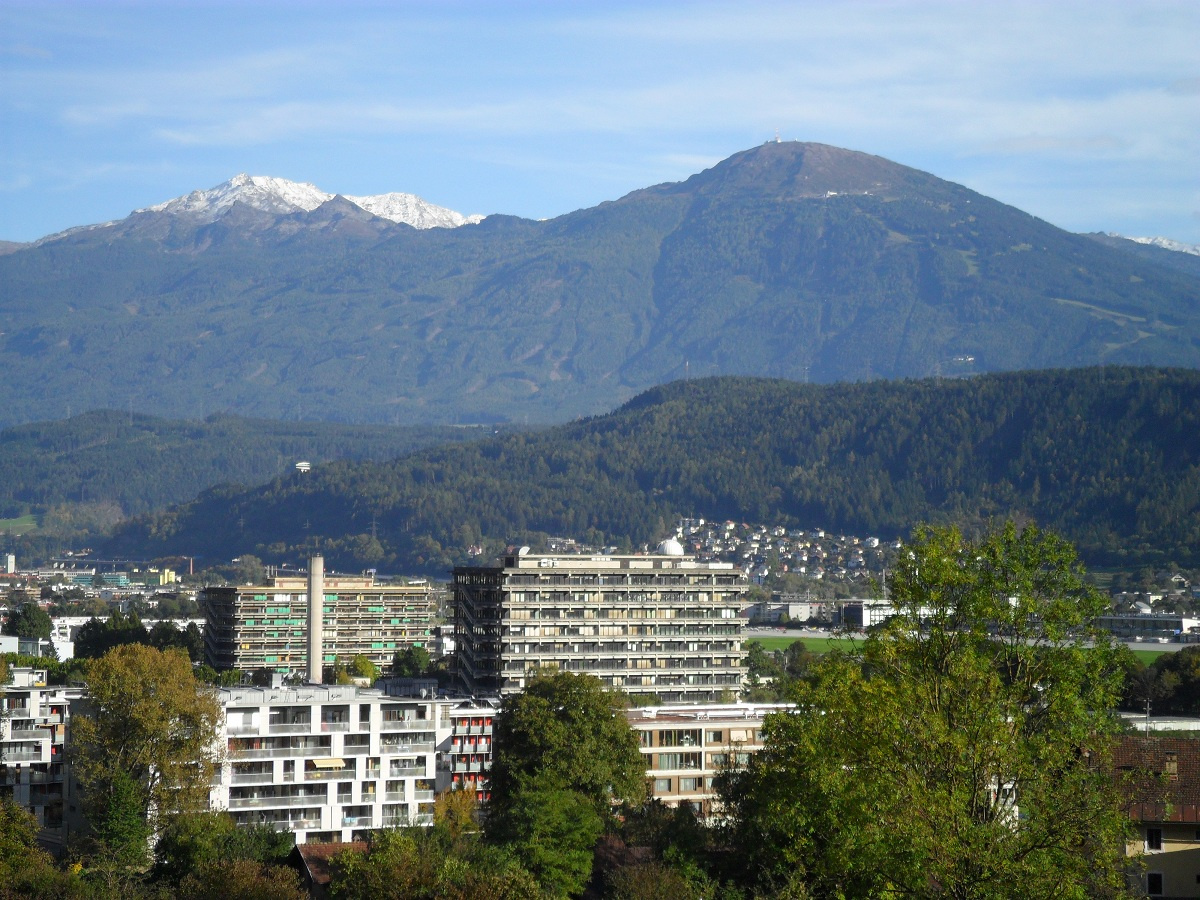
Institute of Astro- and Particle Physics of University of Innsbruck can be seen here (the tallest building with a telescope dome on the roof).

Astromundus was a 2-years Erasmus Mundus masters course in Astronomy and Astrophysics. It was offered by a consortium of 5 partner universities of four different European countries. Partner universities were University of Innsbruck in Austria, University of Padova and University of Rome Tor Vergata in Italy, University of Göttingen in Germany and University of Belgrade in Serbia. Belgrade was a third country partner of this consortium.

Main objective of this masters course was to provide students from all over the world with a state-of-the-art background in Astrophysics which would be useful in their future research career. Also, as typical of all other Erasmus Mundus programs, it encourages cultural exchange between different countries. The first edition of AstroMundus officially started on September 22, 2010 in Innsbruck. The welcome reception was held at Claudiasaal, a historical landmark of Innsbruck. The AstroMundus programme ended with the conclusion of the 8th course edition in January 2020.

The programmed spun off a new Erasmus Mundus master’s degree programme called MASS.

== Topics of interest ==
Courses offered by Astromundus are mainly on these topics. They span throughout almost all the branches of Modern Astronomy, Astrophysics and Cosmology.

- Galactic Astrophysics (the Sun and the Solar System, the Milky Way, stellar evolution, the interstellar medium)
- Planetology and Astrobiology (including Extrasolar planets)
- Extragalactic Astrophysics (galaxies, galaxy evolution, galaxy clusters, intracluster medium, star formation)
- Active Galactic Nuclei (including accretion theory, relativistic jets, modelling)
- Cosmology (including observational cosmology, galaxy surveys, gravitational lensing, very early universe)
- Particle Cosmology
- Astroparticle physics
- Gravitational waves
- Observational astrophysics from the ground and from space (including Radio, X-ray, optical)
- Computational astrophysics (N-body simulations, magneto-hydrodynamic simulations, High energy physics with CERN)

== Scholarships ==
Like all Erasmus Mundus programmes, Astromundus was funded by European Commission. Two categories of scholarships are awarded to the selected students: category A for non-European students and category B for European students. For the first edition, the students who were awarded the "category A" scholarships came from Bangladesh, Egypt, Ethiopia, India, Mexico, Pakistan, Taiwan, Turkey and the United States. European students came from Bosnia and Herzegovina, Bulgaria, Italy, North Macedonia and Spain.

Students holding a category A scholarship got 1000 euros per month during the whole 24-month period of their master studies. Additionally, 4000 euros were given in the beginning of every academic year. In total a category A scholarship amounts to 32,000 euros excluding tuition and insurance fees. Students did not need to pay tuition fees in any of the partner universities, and they would also get an international health and travel insurance valid for two years. Including the tuition and insurance fees, this particular scholarship would amount to almost 48,000 euros in two years. On the other hand, category B scholarship holding European students get 500 euros per month during the whole period. Usually, they would not get the travel allowance, although one can get an allowance of 3000 euros if they spend more than 3 months in the University of Belgrade. On the contrary if any student holding a category A scholarship spends more than 3 months in Belgrade, they were not paid for the months in excess of three. This system had been devised especially to encourage European students to go to third-world countries and third-world country students to visit Western European universities.

Scholarships for scholars are also available in Astromundus. These are short term scholarships awarded for teaching or research for a maximum period of three months

== Partner universities ==
=== University of Innsbruck ===
University of Innsbruck was the coordinating university of this programme, and prospective students needed to send their application package there. First semester of the programme was also held at this university, and all the students would go there for the first semester which usually starts during winter. Innsbruck offer introductory graduate courses on various fields of Physics, Mathematics and Astrophysics so that students from different background can come to an equal standard and be ready for the next semesters.

Courses offered by the University of Innsbruck are: Advanced Mathematical Methods for Astrophysicists, Concepts of Physics for Astrophysicists, Concepts of Galactic Astrophysics, Concepts of Extragalactic Astrophysics, Introduction to Radio Astronomy, Galaxy Groups, Basic Concepts of Astro- and Particle Physics, Astrophysics Laboratory etc. Among these first four courses are compulsory. Each of the compulsory courses carry six credits. In total a student need to cover 30 credits in one semester of Astromundus.

=== University of Padova ===
University of Padova was one of the oldest universities in Italy. It hosts two (second and final) of the four semesters of Astromundus.

=== University of Rome Tor Vergata ===
University of Rome Tor Vergata was the second public university of Rome and hosts all of the last three semesters of Astromundus. A student can spend 3 semesters here but it was encouraged to change institutions.

More specialized courses are offered here. Such as, Extragalactic Astrophysics 1, Relativity and Cosmology, Stellar Astrophysics, Experimental Solar Physics, Extragalactic Astrophysics 2 (Observational cosmology and Galaxy clusters), Space Physics, Planetology, Astrobiology, Physics of Gravitation Radiative Processes in Astrophysics etc. Jonathan Lunine, a planetary scientist and physicist from the United States, was currently working here as a visiting professor who offers lectures in Planetology.

=== University of Göttingen ===
For the last two semesters students would go to the University of Goettingen, which was ranked 4th in Germany, 30th in Europe and 93rd in the world in 2010 by the Academic Ranking of World Universities. Courses offered here are mainly on stellar structure and evolution, stellar atmospheres and their modelling, active galactic nuclei, numerical experiments in astrophysics, cosmological structure formation, inflationary theory, helioseismology, and the physics of the Sun. They also offer some seminar courses related to string theory and supermassive black holes that one can take for credits.

=== University of Belgrade ===
University of Belgrade is situated in Belgrade, the capital of Serbia. Students can go there for the last two semesters. The best master theses written by Astromundus students will be considered for publication in the Serbian Astronomical Journal published by the Astronomical Observatory Belgrade and the Department of Astronomy, Belgrade.

== Examination and grade conversion scheme ==
A student typically needs to go to more than two universities in two years. Thus, they would encounter different environments, different examination, and different grading systems. Like in Innsbruck, in accordance with the Austrian system, exams are usually in written form and grades are given on a scale of 1 to 5, 1 being excellent and 5 being insufficient and grades have to be an integer number. In Italy however exams are usually oral (typically 40 minutes to one hour, sometimes even longer) and grades range from 0 to 30, 17 being fail and 30 being the highest score. They also have a grade named 30 LODE (or 30+) awarded for exceptionally good performances. In Germany, exams are again oral (lasting for 15 to 30 minutes) and grading system was somewhat similar to Austria. Only here the difference was, grades don't necessarily have to be an integer, students very frequently get grades like 1.3, 1+, 2.7 etc. Serbian system was very different, their marks range from 1 to 100 with a passing mark of 50.

As it was a joint master programme, one certificate had to be offered by the consortium as a whole, all the different grades are converted into the Austrian system, University of Innsbruck being the coordinating university. The grade conversion scheme was given below:

Country	Insufficient	Sufficient	Satisfactory	Good	Excellent
Austria	5	4	3	2	1
Germany	5, 6	4-, 4, 4+, 3.7	3-, 3, 3.3, 3+, 2.7	2-, 2, 2.3, 2+, 1.7	1-, 1, 1+, 1.3
Italy	0-17	18-20	21-24	25-27	28-30 LODE
Serbia	<50(not passing)	51-60(6)	61-70(7)	71-80(8)	81-100(9)(10)
