= List of Serbian-language magazines =

== Active ==
Magazine	Publisher	Type	Active	Notes
Politikin Zabavnik
NIN

== Defunct ==
Magazine	Publisher	Type	Active	Notes
Pogledi	NIP Pogledi, Kragujevac	Politics	1982–2005	
Duga	BIGZ, Belgrade	News	1970s–2000s	
Srpska zora	Vienna	Illustrated	1876–1881	
Stražilovo			1885–94	Digital Library
Ruski arhiv		Politics, Culture, Economy	1928–37	Focus on Russia. Digital Library
Golub	Karakašević, in Sombor	Youth magazine	1879–1914	

== See also ==
- List of academic journals published in Serbia
- List of Serbian-language journals

== Sources ==
- Milana Bikicki (1993). Prilozi za istoriju srpske periodike. Biblioteka Matice srpske. ISBN 9788680061108.
- Jeremija D. Mitrović (1984). Građa za istoriju i bibliografiju srpske periodike do 1920. godine: (časopisi, novine, kalendari, almanasi). Prosveta.
- Yugoslav Scientific Research Directory. Nolit. 1964.
