= List of Serbian-language journals =

This is a list of the most important journals in Serbian history.

== Academic ==
Journal	Publisher	Type	Active	Notes
Voice of SANU — Glas SANU (Глас САНУ)	Serbian Academy of Sciences and Arts	Academic	1887–present	
Monument — Spomenik (Споменик)	Serbian Academy of Sciences and Arts	Academic		
Glasnik Etnografskog instituta SANU	Serbian Academy of Sciences and Arts	Academic		
Serbian Ethnographical Journal — Srpski etnografski zbornik (Српски етнографски зборник)	Serbian Academy of Sciences and Arts	Academic: Ethnography		
Journal for History, Language and Literature — Zbornik za istoriju, jezik i književnost srpskog naroda (Зборник за историју, језик и књижевност српског народа)	Serbian Academy of Sciences and Arts	Academic: History, Linguistics and Literature		
Dijalekatski zbornik (Дијалекатски зборник)	Serbian Academy of Sciences and Arts	Academic: Dialectology		
Glasnik Srpskog učenog društva (Гласник Српског ученог друштва)	Srpsko učeno društvo	Academic	1868–1886	
Glasnik Društva srpske slovesnosti (Гласник Друштва српске словесности)	Društvo srbske slovesnosti	Academic	1847–1864	
Annals of Matica srpska — Letopis Matice srpske (Летопис Матице српске)	Matica srpska		1824–present	The oldest Serbian literary journal.

== Other ==
Journal	Publisher	Type	Active	Notes
Branko's Circle — Brankovo kolo (Бранково коло)	Srpska manastirska štamparija (in Sremski Karlovci)	Literature	1895–1914	
Brotherhood — Brastvo (Браство)	Društvo „Sveti Sava“ (in Belgrade)	History, Geography and Folklore	1887–?	
Bosnian Fairy — Bosanska vila (Босанска вила)	? (in Sarajevo)	Literature	1886–1914	The only Serbian magazine in Austro-Hungarian Bosnia-Herzegovina
Fairy — Vila (Вила)	Stojan Novaković (in Belgrade)	Entertainment, Literature and Sciences	1865–1868	
Serbian Literary Journal — Srpski književni glasnik (Српски књижевни гласник)	Pavlović and Stojanović (in Belgrade)	Literature	1901–1914; 1920–1941	The most important Serbian journal of the first half of the 20th century. Regarded as "One of the most excellent periodicals in the history of Serbian literature" which also played "an exceptionally important part in the history of Serbian music criticism and essay literature".
Journal of the Ethnographic Museum	Ethnographic Museum (in Belgrade)	Ethnography	1926–present	Digital Library
Glasnik Srpskog geografskog društva		Geography	1912–present	Digital Library (2002–)
Istorijski časopis (Historical Review)	Istorijski institut (in Belgrade)	History	1948–present	Digital Library (2001–)

== See also ==
- List of academic journals published in Serbia
- List of Serbian-language magazines

== Sources ==
- Milana Bikicki (1993). Prilozi za istoriju srpske periodike. Biblioteka Matice srpske.
- Jeremija D. Mitrović (1984). Građa za istoriju i bibliografiju srpske periodike do 1920. godine: (časopisi, novine, kalendari, almanasi). Prosveta.
- Yugoslav Scientific Research Directory. Nolit. 1964.
