= Zhivko =

Zhivko (Cyrillic: Живко) is a Bulgarian masculine given name. The Serbo-Croatian variant of the same name is Živko.

It may refer to:

- Zhivko Atanasov (born 1991), Bulgarian footballer
- Zhivko Boyadzhiev (born 1976), Bulgarian footballer
- Zhivko Dinev (born 1987), Bulgarian footballer
- Zhivko Gospodinov (1957–2015), Bulgarian footballer
- Zhivko Milanov (born 1984), Bulgarian footballer
- Zhivko Vangelov (born 1960), Bulgarian wrestler
- Zhivko Videnov (born 1977), Bulgarian hurdler
- Zhivko Zhelev (born 1979), Bulgarian footballer
