= Kosta Mandrović =

Serbian illustrator, author and publisher

Konstantin "Kosta" Mandrović (Serbian Cyrillic: Коста Мандровић, fl. 1873–1903) was a Serbian illustrator, author and publisher in Vienna, Austria.

He was an ethnic Serb who lived in Vienna. He was an experienced book trader before he started publishing the illustrated magazine of "Srpska zora" (1876-1881).

== Work ==
- Mandrović, Kosta (1884). Илустрована историја српског народа, од најстаријих времена до проглашења нове краљевине. За народ и школу. Са 100 слика [Illustrirte Geschichte der Serben]. Verlag v. Jos. A. Massanetz & Comp. in Wien.
- Mandrović, Kosta (1885). Илустрована историја српског народа, од најстаријих времена до проглашења нове краљевине. За народ и школу. Са 120 слика и једном картом Балканског полуострова [Illustrirte Geschichte der Serben].
- Mandrović, Kosta (1902). Илустроване историје српског народа. Vol. I. Рајнерштрасе № 41.
- Mandrović, Kosta (1902). Илустроване историје српског народа. Vol. II. Рајнерштрасе № 41.
- Mandrović, Kosta (1902). Илустроване историје српског народа. Vol. III. Рајнерштрасе № 41.
- Mandrović, Kosta (1902). Илустроване историје српског народа. Vol. IV.
- Mandrović, Kosta (1902). Илустроване историје српског народа. Vol. V.
- Mandrović, Kosta (1902). Илустроване историје српског народа. Vol. VI.
- Mandrović, Kosta (1902). Илустроване историје српског народа. Vol. VII.
- Mandrović, Kosta (1903). Илустроване историје српског народа. Vol. VIII.
- Mandrović, Kosta (1903). Илустроване историје српског народа. Vol. IX.
- Mandrović, Kosta (1903). Илустрована историја српског народа, од најстаријих времена до краја XIX. века. За народ и школу. Друго умножено издање. Са 144 слике и једном картом Балканског полуострова [Illustrirte Geschichte der Serben]. Stamparija Fridriha Jaspera.
