= Srpska zora (magazine) =

Serbian-language magazine (1876–1881)

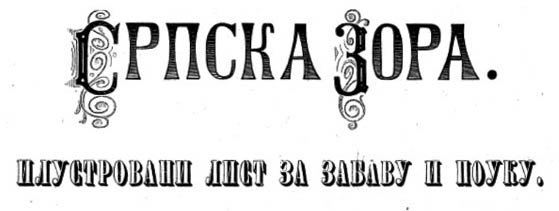
- Type: Magazine
- Owner(s): Kosta Mandrović (1876), Todor Stefanović Vilovski (1876–1881)
- Editor: Mita Georgiević (1876), Todor Stefanović Vilovski (1876–1881)
- Founded: January 1876
- Ceased publication: 1881
- Language: Serbian in the Cyrillic alphabet
- Headquarters: Vienna, Austria-Hungary

Srpska zora (Serbian: Српска зора, "Serb Dawn") was a Serbian-language magazine published in Vienna, Austria-Hungary, between 1876 and 1881. It was founded by publisher Kosta Mandrović, with Mita Georgiević as editor until the fourth issue when Todor Stefanović Vilovski succeeded as editor. From the second issue in 1877, the ownership and publication was handed to Vilovski. It was first published in January 1876, and published in the Armenian Monastery in Vienna, and was later published in the Bulgarian printing house of Yanko S. Kovachev. It was mostly published monthly.

Among contributors were Stefan Mitrov Ljubiša, Jovan Jovanović Zmaj, Đura Jakšić, Milan Đ. Milićević, Ljubomir Nenadović, Jakov Ignjatović, Laza Lazarević, Branko Radičević, Laza Kostić, Vuk Vrčević, Milorad Petrović Šapčanin, Đorđe Rajković, Jovan Simeonović Čokić, Jovan Stefanović Vilovski, Stojan Novaković, Miša Dimitrijević, Čedomilj Mijatović, Felix Kanitz, Milan Jovanović Batut, and others.

The magazine is notable for covering the South Slavic wars and rebellions, including illustrations.

== See also ==
- List of Serbian-language magazines

== Sources ==
- Ženarju, Ivana (2011). "Slike rata u ilustrovanom časopisu "Srpska zora" (1876-1881)" [Images of War in the Srpska zora Illustrated Magazine (1876-1881)]. Baština. 31 – via Academia.edu.
- Ženarju, Ivana (2012). Хероји, политика, свакодневница: илустровани свет Српске зоре (1876-1881). Задужбина Андрејевић – via Academia.edu.
- Matica srpska. "Изложбе: СРПСКА ЗОРА 1876. (150 година од изласка првог броја Српске зоре)". Библиотека Матице српске [Library of Matica srpska].
- Књижевни илустровани лист "Српска зора", RTS, 2022
- Vilovski, Todor Stefanović, ed. (1880). Српска зора. Vol. 5.
