= Journal of Mining and Metallurgy, Section B =

- Discipline: Mining, Metallurgy
- Language: English
- Edited by: Dragana Živković

Publication details
- Former names: Journal of Mining and Metallurgy (Yugoslavia), Glasnik Rudarstva i Metalurgije
- History: 1965-present
- Publisher: University of Belgrade (Serbia)
- Frequency: Biannual
- Open access: yes
- Impact factor: 1.134 (2019)

Standard abbreviations
- ISO 4: J. Min. Metall. B

Indexing
- CODEN: JMBMFR
- ISSN: 1450-5339 (print); 2217-7175 (web)
- OCLC no.: 189921907

Links
- Journal homepage; Online archiv

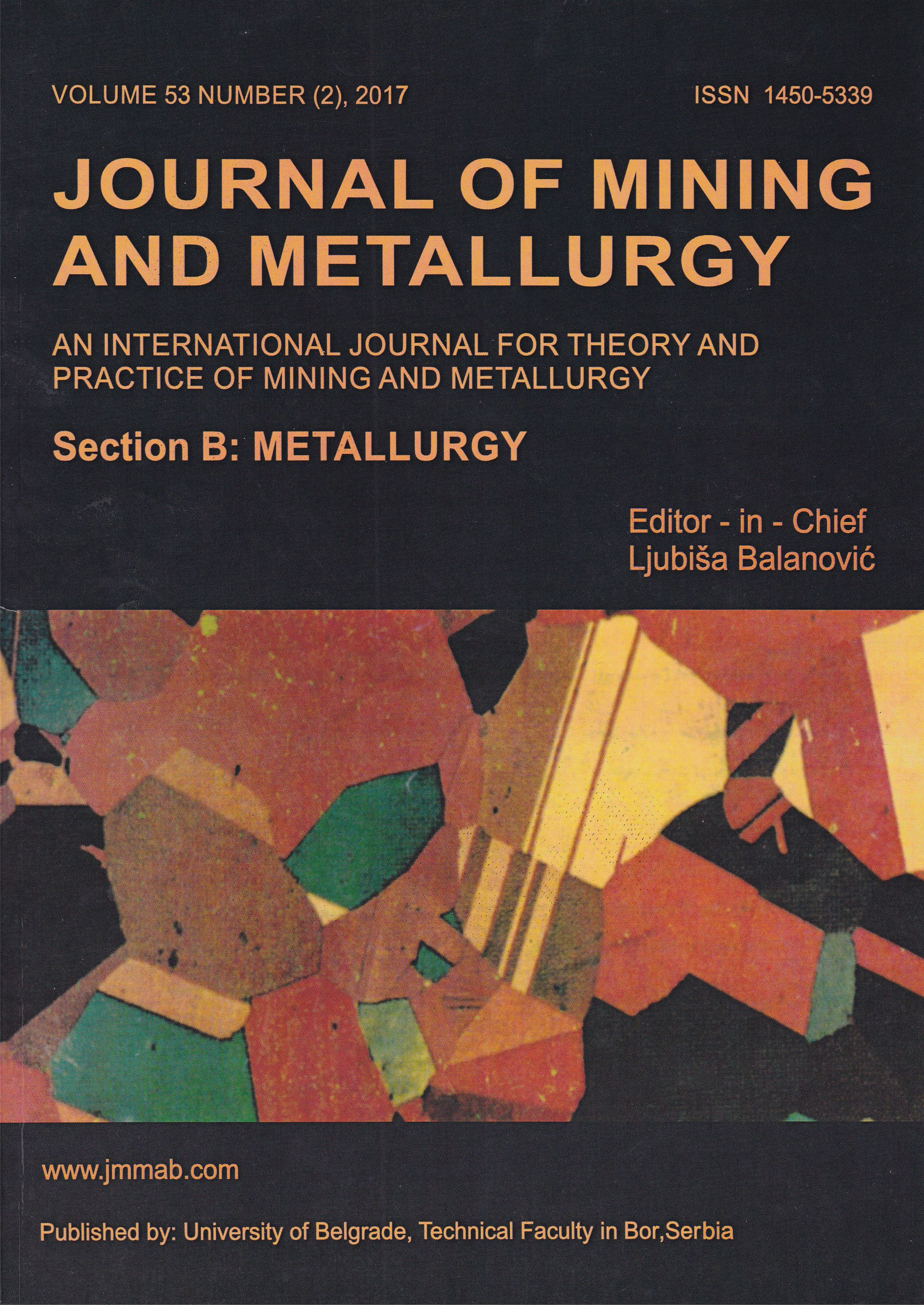
Cover of 2017 edition

The Journal of Mining and Metallurgy, Section B: Metallurgy is a biannual peer-reviewed scientific journal that covers mining and metallurgy. The editor-in-chief is Dragana Živković (University of Belgrade). Publishing formats include original research articles, review articles, short notices, letters, and book reviews.

== Abstracting and indexing ==
The journal is abstracted and indexed in:

- Science Citation Index Expanded
- Materials Science Citation Index
- Chemical Abstracts
- Scopus
- EBSCO databases
- VINITI Database RAS

According to the Journal Citation Reports, the journal has a 2012 impact factor of 1.435, ranking it 12th out of 75 journals in the category "Metallurgy & Metallurgical Engineering".
