= Živko R. Adamović =

Entomologist (1923–1998)

Živko Rafailo "Dika" Adamović (March 9, 1923 – May 1, 1998) was a Yugoslav and Serbian entomologist, expert in Odonatology, ecologist and a painter. He was a curator at the Museum of Natural History, Belgrade, and staff member at the National Institute for Medical Research at the University of Belgrade. Most of his research deals with the fauna of the former Yugoslavia, and combine ecology, morphometry, taxonomy and studies of biogeography.

== Life and career ==
Živko Adamović was born in a craftsman's family in Obrenovac near Belgrade in 1923. His father Rafailo was a tailor and his mother Bosiljka was a housewife; apart from their son, they also had four daughters. After attending the elementary school in Obrenovac, Adamović completed a teacher-training in Belgrade in 1942. After a brief employment as a teacher, in 1945 he joined the Serbian Natural History Museum (Museum of Natural History, Belgrade).

In 1952 he graduated from the Faculty of Natural Sciences and Mathematics (in Biology) in Belgrade. It was during this period that he published his first scientific papers, which mark the beginnings of odonatology in the post-World War II Yugoslavia. In the subsequent years, Adamović broadened his research interests, publishing on Cicindelidae and Cerambycidae (Coleoptera) and particularly also on Asilidae (Diptera). Robber flies were the object of his special interest; his doctoral dissertation was titled “Ecology of some asilid species and their relationships with the native bee, Apis mellifica L." (1963). In 1972 he moved to the Institute for Medical Research, at the University of Belgrade, from which he formally retired in 1986. During that period he worked on the Psychodidae and Culicidae (Diptera). His papers on the mosquitoes represent an invaluable contribution to our knowledge of the fauna and ecology of these insects in the territory of the former Yugoslavia.

Throughout his life, most particularly after his formal retirement, Adamović continued his odonatological studies. His first papers are dealing with the older institutional collections (1948, 1949), but later on he began to gather material and data in the field himself and produced a number of valuable publications, such as his 1956 treatment of the fauna of southern Banat in Serbia. In 1967 he was invited by Annin Heymer to participate in the tribute issue of the Deutsche entomologische Zeitschrift, in celebration of Erich Schmidt's 70th anniversary. Adamović had a longstanding and intense correspondence with Dr. Schmidt, contributing a paper on the odonate fauna of the Dubrovnik area in Dalmatia, which remains one of the key works on the fauna of the Adriatic coast. He also produced a monograph on the Odonata of the Durmitor Range in Montenegro, where much emphasis is given to ecology, altitudinal distribution and biogeography. In other papers he analyzed odonate communities in peculiar habitats or in the regions of particular nature conservation interest. Noteworthy are his morphometric studies on Cordulegaster heros in Serbia and Macedonia (1992), on Calopteryx balcanica and C. splendens ancilla (1996c) and on Platycnemis pennipes nitidula (1997).

Adamović was primarily an ecologist by vocation. But he was also a gifted taxonomist and biogeographer, and contributed significantly to applied medical entomology as well. In Diptera and Orthoptera he published seven taxa new to science. On numerous occasions he acted as a mentor to M.Sc. and Ph.D. candidates, and assisted in preparation and defense of their work related to Odonata and mosquitoes. Another project of his was starting a journal, Acta entomologica serbica, published by the Entomological Society of Serbia, where he was appointed as the Editor-in-Chief. The first issue appeared in 1996. Before that, he was in the editorial board of Acta entomologica jugoslavica and committee of the Entomological Society of Yugoslavia.

He was an active member of the Serbian Biological, Serbian Ecological, and Serbian Entomological Societies. The Serbian Academy of Sciences and Arts invited him on their Committee for Fauna of Serbia. He was also a member of the Organisationskomitee der Entomo-Faunistik Mitteleuropas (with its main office in Austria). The International Odonatological Society (S.I.O.) he joined almost immediately upon its inception. He participated actively at the Kyoto Meeting, convened by the S.I.O. Japanese Branch in the framework of the 16th International Congress of Entomology (1980), and at the 1st Odonatological Symposium of the Alps-Adriatic Regional Community, in Maribor, Slovenia (1994).

Adamović was known as an artist painter - a member of the widely known and distinguished group the “Four Painters of Obrenovac.” Apart from Adamović, other members were Voja Stamenić, Brane Vujčić and Ilija Vićić. They had a collective exhibition in Obrenovac in 1958 in Dom JNA gallery.

== Odonatological bibliography ==
- 1948 Liste des demoiselles (Odonata, Fabr.) de ITnstitut biologique B Sarajevo. GodiSnjak biol. Inst. Saraj. 1(1): 79–84. — [Serb., with Fr. s.]
- 1949 La liste des odonates du Museum d’Histoire Naturelle du Pays Serbe. Glasn. prir. Muz. srp. Zemlje (B) 1/2: 275–293. — [Serb., with Fr. s.]
- 1950 Seconde contribution ä l'etude des asilides comme les ennemis des abbeilles. Arh. biol. Nauka 2(1): 4-75. — (Serb., with Fr. title; — include references to Odon.
- 1956 List of the collected species of Odonata from South Banat, Serbia. Glasn. prir. Muz. srp. Zemlje (B) 8(2): 101–128. - [With Serb, s.]
- 1963a Rezhim pitaniya nekotoryh vidov ktyrey (Asilidae, Diptera) v Yugoslavii. Arh. biol. Nauka 15(1/2): 37–74. — [Russ., with Fr. title; — include references to Odon.; — Engl. s. was circulated with the reprints]
- 1963b Ecology of some asilid species (Asilidae, Diptera) and their relation to honeybee (Apis mellifica L.). Posebna Izd. prir. Muz. Beogr. 30: 1–104. — [Serb., with Engl, s.; — includes references to Odon.]
- 1964a The feeding habits of some asilid species (Asilidae, Diptera) in Yugoslavia. Arh. biol. Nauka 15(1/2): 41–74. — [Includes references to Odon.]
- 1964b Robber-flies positions in the biotic community (Diptera, Asilidae). Zast. Prir. 27/28: 221–227. — (Serb., with Engl. & Russ, s's; — includes references to Odon.]
- 1966 Ecological differences of some closely related species. Ekalogija 1(1/2): 121–131. — [With Croat, s.; — includes a treatment of Aeshna affinis and A. mixta]
- 1967 Odonata collected in Dubrovnik district, Jugoslavia [sic!]. Dt. eni. Z. (N.F.) 14(3/4): 283–302.
- 1982 (— & L. ANDJUS) Pregled dosadaänjih istrazivanja faune Odonata SR Srbije. — [Review of the investigations on the Odonata fauna in SR Serbia]. Sadr. Ref. Skup. Em. Yug., Zabljak, p. 6. - [Serb.]
- 1983 (— & L. ANDJUS) Odonata na podruCju Obedske bare. — [Odonates in the area of Obedska bara], /«: Zasita. uredjivanje I unapredjenje Obedske bare, pp. 47–50, Pokr. Zavod za zašt. prir. Novi Sad. — [Serb.]
- 1985 (ANDJUS, L. & —) Novi podaci o fauni Odonata Cme Gore. — [New data on the Odonata of Montenegro]. - Sadr. Ref. ent. Kolok. jugosl. Ent. Dr, Donji Milanovac, p. 10. — [Serb.]
- 1986a (ANDJUS, L. & —) IScezle i ugro/enc vrste Odonata u siroj okolini Beograda. — [Extinct and vulnerable Odonata species in the surrounding of Belgrade]. Sadr. Ref. 16 Skup Entomol. Jugosl., Vrsac, p. 16. — [Serb.]
- 1986b (— & L. ANDJUS) Ekoloäko odvajanje i koegzistencija nekih bliskih vrsta Odonata i Diptera. — [Ecological separation and coexistence in some allied Odonata and Diptera species]. Zbom. Ref. 7 Kongr. Biol. Jugosl., Budva, p. 180. — [Serb,]
- 1988 (— & L. ANDJUS) Skupine Odonata u planinskim stanistima Jugoslavije. — [Odonata com- munities in the mountainous habitats in Yugoslavia], Zborn. Ref. 4 Kongr. Ekol. Jugosl., Ohrid, pp. 360–361. — [Serb,]
- 1990a Odonata collected in Strumiska kotlina, Macedonia, Yugoslavia. Glasn. prir. Muz. Beogr. (B) 45: 47–59. — [With Serb, s.]
- 1990b Odonata of Daicsko jezero. Bull. Acad, serbe Sci. Arts (Sei. math, nat.) 102(32): 15–20.
- 1992 (— , L. ANDJUS & A. MLADENOVlC,) Cordulegaster Heros Theischinger, 1979 in Serbia and Macedonia (Odonata, Cordulegastridae). Opusc. zool. flumin. 101: l-l I
- 1993 Distribution of Odonata at Krupadko jezero, Serbia. Bull. Acad, serbe Sci. Arts (Sci. math. nat.) 106(34): 9-22.
- 1994 ( —, L. ANDJUS & L. MIHAILOVIC,) Habitat distribution and biogeographical features of the Odonata species in the Durmitor range, Montenegro. Abstr. Pap. Posters I. Odonat. Symp. Alps-Adriatic reg. Community, Maribor, p. 6.
- 1996a (—, L. ANDJUS & L. MIHAILOVIC,) Odonata (Insecta), Fauna Durmitora 5: 43–80, 3 col. pls excl.. — [Engl, with Serb, s.]
- 1996b ( —, L. ANDJUS & L. MIHAILOVlC,) Habitat distribution and biogeographical features of the Odonata in the Durmitor range, Montenegro. Nolul. odonatol. 4(7): 109–114.
- 1996c ( — & S.T. VIJATOV) Morphometric examination of Calopteryx balcanica Fudakowski, 1930 and C. splendens ancilla Selys, 1853 (Zygoptera: Calopterygidae). Odonatologica 25(2): 109–118.
- 1996d Odonata taken and observed in Donji Ceklin, Montenegro. Acta ent. serb. 1(1/2): 39–48. — [With Serb, s.]
- 1996e ( — & S.T. VIJATOV) The summer Odonata species in the lower Tisa Valley, Banat. Acta ent. Serb. 1(1/2): 63–80. — [With Serb, s.]
- 1997 ( — & S.T. VIJATOV) Morphometric distinction of Platycnemis pennipes nitidula Bridle, 1832 from P. p. pennipes Pallas, 1771 (Odonata: Platycnemididae). Acta ent. serb. 2(1/2); 61–75. — [With Serb, s.). Adamović also published papers on mosquitoes, robber flies, locusts and other insects.
