= Živko Andrijašević =

Montenegrin historian and writer

- Born: 24 February 1967 (age 59); Bar, Montenegro, SFRY
- Education: University of Belgrade MA & PhD
- Occupation: Historian

Živko M. Andrijašević (born 24 February 1967) is a Montenegrin historian and writer.

He is the author of the standard historical dictionary of Montenegro.

== Biography ==
Živko Andrijašević was born on February 24, 1967 in Bar. He graduated in 1991 from the Faculty of Teaching (Philosophy) in Nikšić. He completed a M.A degree from the Faculty of Philosophy, University of Belgrade in 1998 with the thesis "The National Ideology of Nikola I Petrović Njegoš 1860-1878". He completed his PhD there in 2003 with the thesis "State Ideology of Montenegro 1878-1918".

He began his teaching training in 1993 at the University of Nikšić. As an assistant, he held exercises primarily focused on the history of South Slavs in the Middle Ages. He was elected to the position of assistant professor on April 6, 2004. He became Associate Professor in June 2009 and full Professor in 2015.

== Works ==
His works include:

- Pokrštavanje Muslimana 1913 godine (co-author with Zoran Stanojević), Published: Podgorica: Almanah, 2003.
- History of Montenegro: From Ancient Times to 2003; Part one Živko M. Andrijašević, part two Šerbo Rastoder. Published: Podgorica: Diaspora center, 2006.
- Istorijski Leksikon Crne Gore (Historical Dictionary of Montenegro)(co-author, co-editor), Published: 2006
  - Istorijski Leksikon Crne Gore: A-Crn ISBN 86-7706-165-7
  - Istorijski Leksikon Crne Gore: ?-?
  - Istorijski Leksikon Crne Gore: Per-Ž
