= Nenad Živković =

Serbian footballer

Personal information
- Full name: Nenad Živković
- Date of birth: 10 March 1989 (age 37)
- Place of birth: Belgrade, SFR Yugoslavia
- Height: 1.93 m (6 ft 4 in)
- Position: Striker

Senior career*
Years	Team	Apps	(Gls)
2007–2008	Teleoptik	7	(0)
2008–2009	Palilulac Beograd	25	(4)
2009–2011	Srem	58	(11)
2011–2012	BSK Borča	27	(1)
2013	Kolubara	15	(6)
2013	Bežanija	14	(0)
2014	Jedinstvo Užice	8	(3)
2014	BSK Borča	4	(0)
2015	Sinđelić Beograd	14	(1)
2015–2016	Kagoshima United	8	(0)
2016	Sinđelić Beograd	10	(1)
Total		190	(27)
- * Club domestic league appearances and goals as of 14 December 2016

Nenad Živković (Serbian Cyrillic: Ненад Живковић; born 10 March 1989) is a Serbian football forward.
