= Ivan Živković =

Serbian diplomat

Ivan Živković (1947 – 20 November 2016) was a Serbian diplomat. He was last serving as Serbia's ambassador to Kenya. He held several diplomatic offices across Africa, including in Burundi, Comoros, Eritrea, Rwanda, Somalia and Uganda.

Živković died on 20 November 2016 in Nairobi, aged 69. He was rushed to Aga Khan Hospital with breathing problems but died shortly after. At the time of his death, he was living in the Runda suburb of Nairobi.
