= Javi Barrio =

Spanish footballer (born 1991)

Personal information
- Full name: Javier Martínez Barrio
- Date of birth: 21 May 1991 (age 35)
- Place of birth: Logroño, Spain
- Height: 1.85 m (6 ft 1 in)
- Position: Right-back

Team information
- Current team: Cacereño
- Number: 3

Youth career
- Logroñés

Senior career*
Years	Team	Apps	(Gls)
2010–2013	Racing B	77	(3)
2011–2014	Racing Santander	14	(0)
2014–2015	Huracán	14	(1)
2015–2016	Guijuelo	0	(0)
2016	Boiro	13	(1)
2016–2017	Sabadell	21	(0)
2017–2018	Villanovense	36	(1)
2018–2020	Calahorra	24	(1)
2020	Haro	7	(0)
2020–2022	Atlético Sanluqueño	46	(1)
2022–2024	Zamora	8	(0)
2024–	Cacereño	58	(1)
- * Club domestic league appearances and goals as of 9 June 2026

Javier "Javi" Martínez Barrio (born 21 May 1991) is a Spanish footballer who plays as a right-back for Primera Federación club Cacereño.

== Club career ==
Barrio was born in Logroño, La Rioja. A product of hometown club UD Logroñés, he signed a contract with Racing de Santander in 2010, being assigned to the reserves in the Tercera División.

Barrio made his first-team debut on 13 December 2011, starting in a 3–2 home win against Rayo Vallecano in the round of 32 of the Copa del Rey (eventual 6–6 aggregate victory). On 21 April 2013 he first appeared in the league, playing the full 90 minutes in a 1–0 Segunda División loss at Villarreal CF.

On 12 August 2014, Barrio joined Segunda División B side Huracán Valencia CF. He continued to compete in the lower leagues the following seasons, representing CD Guijuelo, CD Boiro, CE Sabadell FC, CF Villanovense, CD Calahorra, Haro Deportivo and Atlético Sanluqueño CF. While at the service of Calahorra, a torn meniscus sidelined him for several months.
