= Živko Ključe =

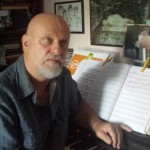
- Born: 30 April 1955
- Era: 20th/21st century
- Awards: Order of Danica Hrvatska

Živko Ključe (born 30 April 1955, Opuzen) is a Croatian composer, double bass player and ethnomusicologist.

== Biography ==
Ključe graduated in double bass at the string section of the Music Academy of Sarajevo in the class of Josip Novosel (1981) and in composition in the class of Anđelka Bego-Šimunić and Ališer Sijarić (2009). After completing his first degree, he became leader of the double bass section of the Mostar Symphony Orchestra, of which he was also director from 1998 to 2007. He has also worked with the Dubrovnik City Orchestra and the Opera of the Croatian National Theatre in Split. He founded the Mostar String Quintet, also dedicating himself to educational activity in Mostar's Music School. He put a lot of effort into preserving the music heritage of the Neretva valley, collecting and setting down old songs, both secular and ecclesiastical. The result of this work was the printing of a collection of arrangements called Stare pisme s ušća Neretve / Old Songs from the Neretva Estuary, and he also published volume of his own compositions entitled Moja ispovid / My Confession. He is the artistic director and founder of several a cappella ensembles. As composer, he has won several awards at the Festival of Dalmatia A Cappella Ensembles in Omiš (including a gold, silver and bronze plaque). He won the Opuzen City Prize for the promotion of music and education. Particularly distinguished among his compositions are Opuzen Mass for male voice a cappella choir, using motifs of vernacular and Glagolitic singing, which has been printed as a pictorial and music portfolio, String Quartet No 1, Passacaglia for wind quartet, SS for violin and piano, Theme and Variations for piano, Song Without Words for double bass and piano, Nerenta Alla Baroco for solo harpsichord or piano and also Fantasy for chamber symphony orchestra. He is a member of several professional music associations (Croatian Composers' Society, Musicological Association of the Federation of Bosnia and Herzegovina, Croatian Association of Orchestral and Chamber Artists, for instance).

== Works (selection) ==
- String Quartet No 1 (2008)
- Fantasia for chamber symphony orchestra (2009)
- Party in the Tavern, for solo voice, harmony-singing group and orchestra (1987)
- Fugheta for piano (2006)
- Mass (from Opuzen) a cappella based on motifs of folk and glagolitic singing for male choir (1996)
- Narenta ala baroco for piano/harpsichord (2008)
- Passacaglia for wind quintet (2008)
- Song for double bass and piano
- SS for violin and piano (2007)
- Theme with Variations for piano (2006)
