= Mirjana Živković =

Serbian composer (1935–2020)

- Born: 3 May 1935; Split, Croatia
- Died: 27 April 2020 (aged 84); Belgrade, Serbia

Academic work
- Institutions: University of Arts in Belgrade
- Website: mirjanaz.com

Mirjana Živković (3 May 1935 – 27 April 2020) was a Serbian composer, musicologist, and longtime professor at the Faculty of Music, University of Arts in Belgrade. She was a member of the Serbian Composers' Association, and her compositions include Summer Night. She published two text books on music, Harmony II and Instrumental Counterpoint and is the joint author of Krađa kulturnog i nacionalnog blaga Jugoslavije (Beograd : NIU "Vojska"; Gornji Milanovac : NIP "Dečje novine", 1995).
