= Filip Mitrović =

Serbian pop singer (born 1991)

Filip Mitrovic
- Born: 31 October 1991 (age 34); Kraljevo
- Genres: Folk, pop
- Occupation: Singer
- Years active: 2011–present
- Label: Grand Production
- Website: filip-mitrovic.com

Filip Mitrovic (born October 31, 1991, Kraljevo) is a Serbian pop singer. Before becoming a singer, he was a pizza master.

== Debut ==
The public was introduced to Filip through the talent show Prvi glas Srbije (season 1) which was aired on Prva Srpska Televizija where he won the fifth place. A year after the expiry of the contract, he signed a new contract and became part of Grand Production, the largest production company in the Balkan.

== Discography ==
In 2013, he began working with Grand Production, one of Serbia’s most proeminent music production companies, through which he released “Šta sam ti ja,” a duet with Serbian folk singer Biljana Sečivanović.

A few months later, he was invited to participate in the reality television show Farma, broadcast by RTV Pink, one of Serbia’s major television networks. He remained on the show for 95 days, gaining significant public exposure beyond the music industry. Following his appearance on the program, he released his first solo single, “Ljubavni parazit,” which soon gained significant popularity on Serbian television and radio stations.

Soon he presented the songs:

- Antidepresiv (2013)
- Luda Glava (2013)
- Brojim (2014)
- Beli grad (2014)
- Ludo Srce (2015)
- Zabranjeno moje (2016)
- Ne pričam nikom o tebi (2017)

In October 2017. Filip released his first album `Virus`.

Filip has collaborated with many serbian composers and arrangers such as Bojan Vasic and Marko Cvetković, who also worked for distinctive balkan music artists such as Saša Matić, Ceca, Aca Lukas and many others.

He was the first serbian singer to shoot a music video in Iceland, which attracted significant media attention since, in 2016 and 2017, the country had been a destination for the world-famous Canadian musician Justin Bieber.

Despite this period of considerable activity between 2013 and 2017, Mitrovic's public presence gradually declined in the following years. He became less prominent in the Serbian mainstream music scene and spent several years away from the public spotlight, after this period of relative absence, Mitrović began returning to the music scene in 2024, releasing new material and gradually rebuilding his public presence.
