= Srpski etnografski zbornik =

- Discipline: Ethnography
- Language: Serbian

Publication details
- History: 1894–present

Standard abbreviations
- ISO 4: Srp. Etnogr. Zb.

Indexing
- OCLC no.: 317725130

The Serbian ethnographic series or Serbian Ethnographical Journal (French: Recueil Serbe d'ethnographie), known in Serbian as Srpski etnografski zbornik (Serbian Cyrillic: Српски етнографски зборник, СЕЗ, СЕЗб/SEZ, SEZb), is a peer reviewed academic journal published by the Serbian Academy of Sciences and Arts (SANU). It includes the subseries Naselja i poreklo stanovništva (Насеља и пореклo становништва), formerly named Naselja srpskih zemalja (Насеља српских земаља).
