= Živko Konstantinović Paraćinac =

Revolutionary in the First Serbian Uprising

Živko Konstantinović Paraćinac (c. 1770 – 1809) was a revolutionary in the First Serbian Uprising who was executed after a trial for leaving his post without a fight.

Historians were unable to determine where he came from, but it can be assumed from his nickname that he was from Paraćin and region around it. He was in the Serbian delegation sent to Constantinople to negotiate a truce during the first insurrection. Also, he was the missing commander of Kladovo when Prince Alexander Prozorovsky's Russian troops arrived in support of the Serb insurgents in their last-ditch effort to defeat the massive Ottoman army at the Battle of Kladovo. Apparently Živko Konstantinović was found negligent for leaving his post at a most crucial time and after a quick court martial he was summarily sentenced to death by firing squad.
