= Acta Entomologica Serbica =

- Discipline: Entomology
- Language: English
- Edited by: Ljiljana D. Protić

Publication details
- Former names: Glasnik Entomološkog društva Kraljevine Srba, Hrvata i Slovenaca, Glasnik Jugoslovenskog entomološkog društva, Acta entomologica Jugoslavica
- History: 1926-present
- Publisher: Entomological Society of Serbia (Serbia)
- Frequency: Biannual

Standard abbreviations
- ISO 4: Acta Entomol. Serbica

Indexing
- ISSN: 0354-9410 (print); 2406-1581 (web)
- OCLC no.: 456154914

Links
- Journal homepage

Acta Entomologica Serbica is a peer-reviewed scientific journal covering entomology published by the Entomological Society of Serbia. It publishes mainly original research papers.

The journal was established as Glasnik Entomološkog društva Kraljevine Srba, Hrvata i Slovenaca (Bulletin of the Entomological Society of the Kingdom of Serbs, Croats and Slovenes) in May 1926, then renamed to Glasnik Jugoslovenskog entomološkog društva (Bulletin of the Yugoslav Entomological Society) in 1929. It was re-established as Acta entomologica Jugoslavica in 1971 and obtained its current name in December 1996. Its founder and first Editor-in-Chief was entomologist and ecologist Dr. Živko R. Adamović.
