= Milorad Živković =

Bosnian politician (born 1963)

- Милорад Живковић

Member of the House of Representatives
- In office 9 December 2002 – 9 December 2014

Personal details
- Born: 2 May 1963 (age 63) Mrkonjić Grad, PR Bosnia and Herzegovina, FPR Yugoslavia
- Party: Alliance of Independent Social Democrats (2000–present)
- Spouse: Slobodanka Živković
- Children: 2
- Education: University of Tuzla; University of Banja Luka

Milorad Živković (born 2 May 1963) is a Bosnian Serb politician and doctor who was a member of the national House of Representatives from 2002 to 2014.

He is a member of the Alliance of Independent Social Democrats.

== Biography ==
Živković was born on 2 May 1963 to parents Dragolije and Riste in the town of Mrkonjić Grad. He completed his elementary and secondary studies in the town, and in 1988 graduated from the University of Tuzla with a degree in Medicine. In 1989 to 1997, he worked as a doctor at a health center in Doboj, later serving two more years at a general hospital nearby. From 1999 to 2003, he worked as the coordinator for reproductive health in Republika Srpska. In 2004, Živković enrolled in the University of Banja Luka, where he received both his Master's degree and his Doctorate in Medicine.

He has been a member of the Alliance of Independent Social Democrats (SNSD) since 2000. At the 2000 parliamentary election, Živković was elected to the National Assembly of Republika Srpska. At the 2002 general election, he was elected to the national House of Representatives. He served three terms in parliament. During his time in office, Živković served as Chairman of the House of Representatives four separate times between 2007 and 2014.

After politics, he returned to medicine, serving as Acting Director of the St. Apostle Luke Hospital in Doboj. Živković was dismissed from the position in 2019 following allegations of financial mismanagement. He was later named the Bosnian Ambassador to Slovenia.

== Personal life ==
Živković is married to his wife Slobodanka and they have two children; a son, Nemanja and a daughter Teodora. The couple has two apartments, one in Bosnia and one in Serbia.

== See also ==
- Republika Srpska
- House of Representatives of Bosnia and Herzegovina
