= Psihijatrija danas =

- Discipline: Mental health
- Language: Serbian
- Edited by: Dušica Lečić-Toševski

Publication details
- Publisher: Institute of Mental Health in Belgrade (Serbia)

Standard abbreviations
- ISO 4: Psihijatr. Danas

Indexing
- ISSN: 0350-2538

Links
- Journal homepage

Psihijatrija danas (in English: Nowadays Psychiatry, or literally Psychiatry Today) is a biannual peer-reviewed academic journal and an official journal of the Psychiatric Association of Serbia. The editor-in-chief is Dušica Lecic-Tosevski. It is published by the Institute of Mental Health (Belgrade).

== Abstracting and indexing ==
The journal is abstracted and indexed in PsycINFO and Psychological Abstracts.
