= Tomislav Živko =

Croatian footballer

Personal information
- Date of birth: 29 January 1988 (age 38)
- Place of birth: Livno, Yugoslavia
- Height: 1.70 m (5 ft 7 in)
- Position: Winger

Youth career
- 2002–2003: Varteks
- 2003–2007: Zagreb

Senior career*
Years	Team	Apps	(Gls)
2007–2008	Vinogradar	22	(0)
2008–2009	FC Rostov	3	(0)
2009	FK Ventspils	4	(0)
2010	Inter Zaprešić	6	(1)
2010–2011	Zelina	5	(0)
2011–2012	Zrinjski Mostar	4	(0)
- * Club domestic league appearances and goals as of 7 January 2012

Tomislav Živko (born 29 January 1988) is a Croatian retired footballer.
