= Živkovo =

- Village
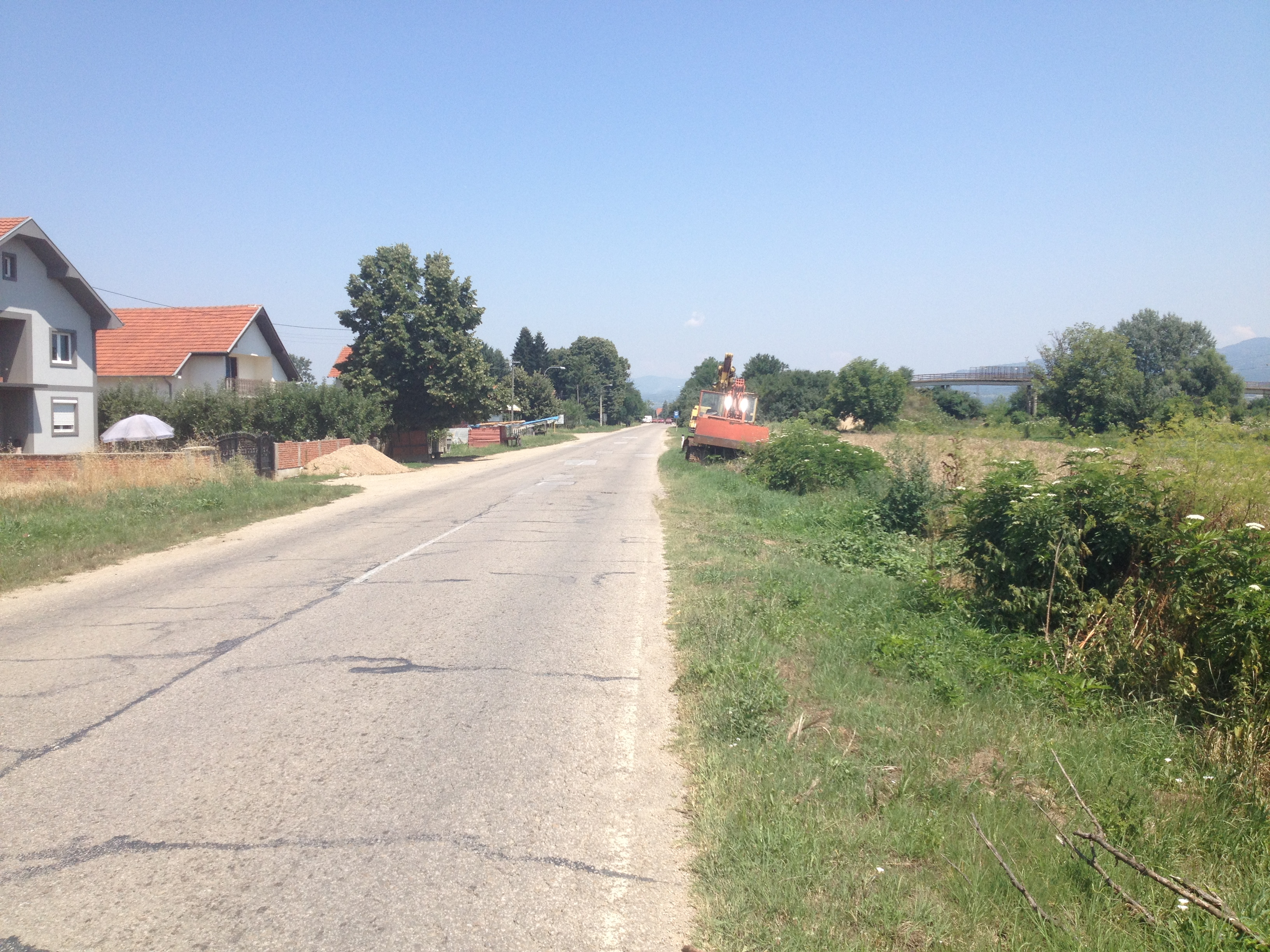
- Živkovo

- Location within Serbia
- Coordinates: 43°04′27″N 21°56′07″E
- Country: Serbia
- District: Jablanica District
- Municipality: Leskovac

Population (2002)
  - Total: 669
- Time zone: UTC+1 (CET)
  - Summer (DST): UTC+2 (CEST)

Živkovo is a village in the municipality of Leskovac, Serbia. According to the 2002 census, the village has a population of 669 people.
