= Radule Živković =

Montenegrin footballer

Personal information
- Full name: Radule Živković
- Date of birth: 22 October 1990 (age 36)
- Place of birth: Titograd, Yugoslavia
- Position: Right-back

Team information
- Current team: Mladost DG
- Number: 29

Senior career*
Years	Team	Apps	(Gls)
2011–2015	Mladost Podgorica	52	(0)
2015–2018	Rudar Pljevlja	81	(3)
2018–2020	OFK Titograd	43	(0)
2020–2021	Podgorica	28	(1)
2021–2023	Dečić	14	(1)
2023–2024	Arsenal Tivat	33	(0)
2024–	Mladost DG	18	(0)
- * Club domestic league appearances and goals as of 3 April 2025

Radule Živković (born 22 October 1990) is a Montenegrin football player who is currently playing for Mladost DG.

Živković started professional career in 2011 at OFK Titograd in that time called Mladost Podgorica. After three years at Rudar Pljevlja where he lifted Montenegrin Cup trophy, he returned to OFK Titograd. In his career, he played for Podgorica, Dečić and Arsenal Tivat.

== Honours ==
Rudar Pljevlja

- Montenegrin Cup: 2015–16

Arsenal Tivat

- Montenegrin Cup (runner-up): 2022–23
