= Serbian Astronomical Journal =

- Discipline: Astronomy
- Language: English
- Edited by: Dejan Urošević

Publication details
- Former names: Bulletin Astronomique de Belgrade, Bulletin de l'Observatoire Astronomique de Belgrade, Publications of the Department of Astronomy
- History: 1936-present
- Publisher: Astronomical Observatory Belgrade and Department of Astronomy, Faculty of Mathematics, University of Belgrade (Serbia)
- Frequency: Biannual
- Impact factor: 1.100 (2013)

Standard abbreviations
- ISO 4: Serb. Astron. J.

Indexing
- CODEN: SAJOFK
- ISSN: 1450-698X (print); 1820-9289 (web)
- LCCN: 2001234058
- OCLC no.: 43554517

Links
- Journal homepage; Bulletin Astronomique de Belgrade; Bulletin de l'Observatoire Astronomique de Belgrade; Publications of the Department of Astronomy

The Serbian Astronomical Journal is a biannual peer-reviewed scientific journal covering astronomy. The journal is the successor of the Bulletin Astronomique de Belgrade (1992–1998), which was formed by a merger of the Bulletin de l'Observatoire Astronomique de Belgrade (1936–1991) and the Publications of the Department of Astronomy (1969–1990). It has been published under the present title since 1998. It is published by the Astronomical Observatory Belgrade and the Department of Astronomy (Faculty of Mathematics, University of Belgrade). It publishes invited reviews, original scientific papers, preliminary reports, and professional papers over the entire range of astronomy, astrophysics, astrobiology, and related fields.

== Abstracting and indexing ==
The Serbian Astronomical Journal is abstracted and indexed by Astrophysics Data System, Chemical Abstracts, Referativni Zhurnal, EBSCO databases, Scopus and Thomson Reuters products
