= List of Slovenian football transfers summer 2026 =

This is a list of Slovenian football transfers for the 2026 summer transfer window. Only transfers featuring Slovenian PrvaLiga are listed.

== Slovenian PrvaLiga ==
Note: Flags indicate national team as has been defined under FIFA eligibility rules. Players may hold more than one non-FIFA nationality.

=== Celje ===
In:

| No. | Pos. | Nation | Player |
|---|---|---|---|
| 2 | DF | LTU | Pijus Širvys (from Maribor) |
| 7 | FW | SLO | Benjamin Verbič (from (Greece) Levadiakos) |
| 9 | FW | SLO | Blaž Kramer (from (Turkey) Konyaspor) |
| 14 | MF | SLO | Luka Vešner Tičić (from (Russia) Nizhny Novgorod) |
| 15 | DF | SLO | Žan Žužek (from (Turkey) Gençlerbirliği) |
| 20 | DF | SEN | Alpha Diounkou (from (Cyprus) Omonia) |
| 23 | GK | SLO | Žiga Frelih (from (Slovakia) Spartak Trnava) |
| 25 | FW | KOS | Veton Tusha (from (Kosovo) Drita) |
| 33 | DF | GRE | Leonardo Koutris (from (Poland) Pogoń Szczecin) |
| 77 | FW | SLO | Matic Ivanšek (from Bravo) |
| 91 | FW | AUS | Yaya Dukuly (from (Australia) Adelaide United) |
| — | DF | SLO | Žan Luka Šega (from Olimpija Ljubljana youth) |
| — | FW | SLO | Lukas Čeh (from Aluminij youth) |

Out:

| No. | Pos. | Nation | Player |
|---|---|---|---|
| 2 | DF | ESP | Juanjo Nieto (to (Spain) Castellón) |
| 5 | MF | SLO | Gašper Vodeb (on loan to Krka) |
| 7 | MF | SLO | Florjan Jevšenak (on loan to Mura) |
| 14 | DF | CRO | Nino Vukasović (to (Bosnia and Herzegovina) Velež Mostar) |
| 15 | DF | ESP | David Castro (to (Spain) Racing Ferrol) |
| 16 | MF | CRO | Ivica Vidović (on loan to (Bosnia and Herzegovina) Zrinjski Mostar) |
| 20 | FW | RUS | Nikita Iosifov (to (Spain) Sporting Gijón) |
| 22 | MF | CRO | Jakov Pranjić (on loan to (Croatia) Gorica) |
| 23 | DF | SLO | Žan Karničnik (to Maribor) |
| 99 | FW | SLO | Matej Poplatnik (to Triglav Kranj) |
| — | FW | SLO | Lukas Čeh (on loan to Beltinci) |
| — | DF | FRO | Hanus Sørensen (on loan to Aluminij, previously on loan at Triglav Kranj) |
| — | DF | SLO | Matija Kavčič (on loan to Brinje Grosuplje, previously on loan at (Poland) Stal Mielec) |
| — | MF | SLO | Žan Luka Žužek (reloan to Dravinja) |
| — | DF | SLO | Matija Boben (to Aluminij, previously on loan at Mura) |
| — | MF | SLO | Lucas Mačak (to Triglav Kranj, previously on loan) |
| — | FW | SLO | Stian Džumhur (free agent, previously on loan at Rudar Velenje) |

=== Koper ===
In:

| No. | Pos. | Nation | Player |
|---|---|---|---|
| 4 | MF | SLO | Leo Štulac (from (Croatia) Istra 1961) |
| 5 | DF | SRB | Filip Bačkulja (from (Serbia) Novi Pazar) |
| 11 | MF | CGO | Nsana Simon (from (Azerbaijan) Sumgayit) |
| 18 | DF | ITA | Giuseppe Agyemang (from (Italy) Novara) |
| 19 | FW | SLO | Robert Berić (free agent) |
| 25 | MF | FRA | Bangaly Diawara (from (Albania) Flamurtari) |
| 26 | FW | SLO | Benjamin Adrović (from Slovan) |
| 29 | DF | SLO | Luka Guček (from (Poland) Górnik Łęczna) |
| 33 | DF | SLO | Amadej Marinič (from Radomlje) |
| 47 | DF | ESP | Álvaro Roncal (from (Bosnia and Herzegovina) Rudar Prijedor) |
| 79 | MF | SLO | David Pejičić (on loan from (Italy) Udinese, previously on loan at Maribor) |
| 86 | MF | AUT | Stefano Surdanovic (from (Bosnia and Herzegovina) Zrinjski Mostar) |
| 90 | GK | ITA | Edoardo Piana (from (Italy) Udinese, previously on loan at (Italy) Monopoli) |

Out:

| No. | Pos. | Nation | Player |
|---|---|---|---|
| 1 | GK | SVK | Michal Kukučka (loan return to (Germany) 1. FC Nürnberg) |
| 2 | DF | LBR | Mark Pabai (to (Netherlands) De Graafschap) |
| 3 | DF | BRA | Felipe Curcio (to (Croatia) Rudeš) |
| 4 | DF | MAD | Scotty Sadzoute (to (France) Sedan) |
| 11 | FW | FRA | Ilann Petrisot (free agent) |
| 12 | GK | ITA | Omar Rugginenti (free agent) |
| 14 | MF | SLO | Jan Strcaj (on loan to Dekani) |
| 15 | DF | SLO | Maj Mittendorfer (to (Kazakhstan) Yelimay) |
| 18 | MF | SLO | Aljaž Zalaznik (to Mura) |
| 21 | MF | SLO | Nik Omladič (to (Austria) GSV St. Martin/Sulmtal) |
| 25 | GK | SLO | Tadej Bonaca (free agent) |
| 30 | FW | GHA | Brian Oddei (to (Armenia) Noah) |
| 33 | DF | SRB | Filip Damjanović (to (Azerbaijan) Turan Tovuz) |
| 42 | MF | FRA | Abdoulaye Dabo (free agent) |
| 80 | MF | BEL | Jean-Pierre Longonda (on loan to (Italy) Mantova) |
| — | FW | CRO | Aldin Delimehić (to (Greece) Eordaikos) |
| — | DF | SLO | Riad Silajdžić (to Dekani, previously on loan) |
| — | DF | NGR | Victor Ehimbe (free agent, previously on loan at Domžale) |
| — | MF | GHA | Mukadas Abdul Samed (to Dekani, previously on loan) |
| — | MF | SLO | Žan Žabkar (to Triglav Kranj, previously on loan at Tabor Sežana) |
| — | MF | CRO | Petar Petriško (to Aluminij, previously on loan at (Bosnia and Herzegovina) Široki Brijeg) |
| — | MF | SLO | Sandro Jovanović (to (Bosnia and Herzegovina) Željezničar, previously on loan at Primorje) |
| — | MF | FRA | Omar El Manssouri (to (Morocco) RS Berkane, previously on loan at (Saudi Arabia) Al-Batin) |
| — | FW | SLO | Maj Žigart (to Izola, previously on loan at Tabor Sežana) |

=== Bravo ===
In:

| No. | Pos. | Nation | Player |
|---|---|---|---|
| 2 | DF | ESP | Raúl Parra (from (Malaysia) Johor Darul Ta'zim) |
| 4 | DF | AUT | Jakob Brunnhofer (on loan from (Austria) Rapid Wien II) |
| 5 | DF | CMR | Ibrahim Halilou (from (France) Lyon B) |
| 6 | MF | SLO | Jon Ficko (from Primorje) |
| 9 | FW | SLO | Aldin Jakupović (on loan from (Germany) Holstein Kiel) |
| 11 | FW | CIV | Okpo Mazié (from (France) Caen) |
| 17 | MF | NGR | James Arinze (from (Denmark) Midtjylland youth) |
| 20 | MF | CIV | Nadon Kouassi (from (Albania) Lushnja) |
| 28 | DF | NGR | Molade Olanrewaju (from (Nigeria) Ikorodu City) |
| 33 | FW | SLO | Milan Tučić (from (Hungary) Újpest) |
| 40 | FW | SLO | Matej Malenšek (on loan from (Czech Republic) Jablonec) |
| 77 | GK | SLO | Matjaž Rozman (from Aluminij) |
| 95 | DF | SLO | Maj Fogec (from Primorje) |
| 99 | MF | SLO | Marko Simonič (from Aluminij) |

Out:

| No. | Pos. | Nation | Player |
|---|---|---|---|
| 5 | MF | SEN | Fallou Faye (to (Czech Republic) Slovan Liberec) |
| 9 | FW | BIH | Admir Bristrić (loan return to Olimpija Ljubljana) |
| 10 | MF | SLO | Martin Pečar (to (Spain) Tenerife) |
| 11 | FW | CAF | Vénuste Baboula (to (Czech Republic) Slovan Liberec) |
| 13 | GK | SLO | Uroš Likar (to (Switzerland) Neuchâtel Xamax) |
| 17 | FW | SLO | Matic Ivanšek (to Celje) |
| 19 | MF | SLO | Tais Šabotić (to Primorje) |
| 23 | DF | COM | Kenan Toibibou (to (Spain) Cádiz) |
| 27 | DF | MKD | David Stojanoski (to Krka) |
| 42 | MF | CRO | Luka Lukanić (free agent) |
| 73 | GK | CRO | Borna Buljan (to (Croatia) Dugopolje) |
| 91 | DF | FRA | Nathan Monzango (to (Azerbaijan) Qabala) |
| — | GK | SLO | Luka Dakić (to Tolmin, previously on loan at Jesenice) |
| — | MF | SLO | Mark Kerin (to Bistrica, previously on loan) |

=== Olimpija Ljubljana ===
In:

| No. | Pos. | Nation | Player |
|---|---|---|---|
| 6 | MF | ESP | Luis Perea (from (Poland) Arka Gdynia) |
| 11 | FW | CAN | Federico Rose (from Mura) |
| 14 | DF | SLO | Kristjan Bendra (from (Austria) Sturm Graz II) |
| 17 | FW | ALB | Marvin Çuni (on loan from (Russia) Rubin Kazan, previously on loan at (Italy) Bari) |
| 19 | FW | ALB | Indrit Tuci (from (Czech Republic) Sparta Prague, previously on loan at (Turkey) Kayserispor) |
| 23 | DF | GEO | Davit Kobouri (from (Hungary) Újpest) |
| 77 | FW | BRA | Xande (from (Bulgaria) Spartak Varna) |
| 79 | FW | SLE | Yayah Kallon (from (Italy) Casertana) |
| 90 | MF | CRO | Robert Mišković (from (Croatia) Opatija) |
| — | DF | BRA | Artur Vinicius (from (Brazil) Fluminense youth) |

Out:

| No. | Pos. | Nation | Player |
|---|---|---|---|
| 11 | FW | ESP | Álex Blanco (to (Turkey) Ümraniyespor) |
| 14 | MF | SLO | Jasmin Kurtić (to Brinje Grosuplje) |
| 16 | MF | ALB | Jurgen Çelhaka (to (Turkey) Muğlaspor) |
| 17 | DF | AUT | Ahmet Muhamedbegović (to (Germany) Dynamo Dresden) |
| 23 | MF | POR | Diogo Pinto (to (Romania) Dinamo București) |
| 24 | MF | NED | Reda Boultam (free agent) |
| 27 | DF | TOG | Frederic Ananou (free agent) |
| 31 | GK | SLO | Tijan Vasić (on loan to Vrhnika) |
| 37 | FW | BRA | Pedro Lucas (free agent) |
| 43 | GK | SLO | Val Matija Zakrajšek (free agent) |
| 45 | MF | SLO | Mateo Aćimović (to (Spain) Las Palmas) |
| 53 | MF | SLO | Miljan Pantić (on loan to Primorje) |
| 52 | GK | SLO | Matevž Dajčar (on loan to Mura) |
| 56 | FW | SLO | Inas Kukavica (to Vrhnika) |
| 58 | DF | BIH | Marat Žlibanović (to (Bosnia and Herzegovina) Sloga Meridian) |
| 81 | MF | SLO | Žiga Pečjak (on loan to Vrhnika) |
| 97 | FW | GHA | Kelvin Ofori (loan return to (Slovakia) Slovan Bratislava) |
| 98 | DF | SLO | Jan Cedilnik (free agent) |
| — | DF | SLO | Vall Janković (free agent, previously on loan at Slovan) |
| — | DF | UKR | Danylo Malov (to (Poland) Lechia Gdańsk, previously on loan at (Armenia) Gandzasar) |
| — | MF | BEN | Mariano Ahouangbo (to (Armenia) Gandzasar, previously on loan) |
| — | FW | BIH | Admir Bristrić (to (England) Leicester City, previously on loan at Bravo) |

=== Maribor ===
In:

| No. | Pos. | Nation | Player |
|---|---|---|---|
| 5 | MF | SLO | Žan Jevšenak (from (Italy) Pisa, previously on loan at (Turkey) Vanspor) |
| 8 | MF | POR | Claude Gonçalves (from (Poland) Legia Warsaw) |
| 17 | FW | SLO | Jan Mlakar (on loan from (Italy) Pisa, previously on loan at (France) Amiens) |
| 21 | DF | SLO | Vid Koderman (from Aluminij) |
| 23 | DF | SLO | Žan Karničnik (from Celje) |
| 25 | DF | SLO | Miha Blažič (from (United Arab Emirates) Kalba) |
| 30 | DF | SLO | Petar Stojanović (on loan from (Poland) Legia Warsaw) |
| 39 | GK | SRB | Ivan Lainović (from (Serbia) Čukarički) |
| 79 | FW | SLO | Luka Zahović (from (Romania) CFR Cluj) |
| 99 | FW | MKD | Behar Feta (from Aluminij) |

Out:

| No. | Pos. | Nation | Player |
|---|---|---|---|
| 2 | FW | ALG | Hillal Soudani (to (Croatia) Kustošija) |
| 5 | DF | LTU | Pijus Širvys (to Celje) |
| 15 | MF | SLO | Jan Repas (to (Cyprus) AEK Larnaca) |
| 17 | MF | ENG | Sheyi Ojo (to (Kazakhstan) Aktobe) |
| 18 | MF | ECU | Óscar Zambrano (to (England) Hull City) |
| 21 | MF | POL | Karol Borys (loan return to (Belgium) Westerlo) |
| 23 | DF | IRL | James Furlong (to (England) Walsall) |
| 27 | FW | SLO | Luka Mlakar (on loan to Tabor Sežana) |
| 30 | FW | GHA | Benjamin Tetteh (to (United Arab Emirates) Kalba) |
| 32 | DF | SLO | Luka Krajnc (free agent) |
| 44 | DF | TUN | Omar Rekik (to (Bulgaria) Ludogorets) |
| 79 | MF | SLO | David Pejičić (loan return to (Italy) Udinese) |
| — | FW | HUN | György Komáromi (on loan to (Hungary) MTK Budapest, previously on loan at (Hungary) Debrecen) |
| — | FW | GAB | Orphé Mbina (to (Azerbaijan) Sabah, previously on loan) |

=== Radomlje ===
In:

| No. | Pos. | Nation | Player |
|---|---|---|---|
| 2 | DF | CRO | Antonio Bosec (from (Croatia) Vukovar 1991) |
| 10 | MF | SLO | Nik Marinšek (from Austria Klagenfurt) |
| 13 | GK | SLO | Nejc Dermastija (from Ilirija 1911) |
| 22 | DF | SRB | Aleksa Paić (from (Serbia) Jedinstvo Ub) |
| 23 | FW | CRO | Josip Balić (from (Croatia) Dugopolje) |
| 24 | MF | CRO | Bruno Burčul (from (Croatia) Rijeka) |
| 27 | FW | NED | Saydou Bangura (from (Croatia) Istra 1961, previously on loan at (Bosnia and Herzegovina) Široki Brijeg) |
| 41 | MF | CRO | Mihael Žaper (reloan from (Croatia) Hajduk Split) |

Out:

| No. | Pos. | Nation | Player |
|---|---|---|---|
| 3 | DF | SLO | Amadej Marinič (to Koper) |
| 10 | MF | SLO | Andrej Pogačar (on loan to (Italy) Catanzaro) |
| 12 | DF | CRO | Matej Mamić (to (Romania) Voluntari) |
| 17 | FW | SLO | Florijan Mežnar (on loan to (Italy) Empoli Primavera) |
| 19 | GK | SLO | Jakob Kobal (to Dekani) |
| 20 | FW | SLO | Luka Kušić (to (Italy) Bologna Primavera) |
| 21 | MF | CIV | Donald Gbinde (free agent) |
| 22 | MF | SRB | Nikola Jojić (loan return to (England) Stoke City) |
| 43 | GK | SLO | Tilen Gašper Štiftar (free agent) |
| 77 | DF | SLO | Žan Žaler (free agent) |
| 85 | DF | CRO | Patrik Klančir (to (Bosnia and Herzegovina) Radnik Bijeljina) |
| 98 | FW | RUS | Stanislav Krapukhin (to Tabor Sežana) |

=== Aluminij ===
In:

| No. | Pos. | Nation | Player |
|---|---|---|---|
| 5 | DF | SLO | Matija Boben (from Celje, previously on loan at Mura) |
| 6 | DF | CRO | Dino Šimunić (from (Croatia) Karlovac 1919) |
| 7 | MF | SRB | Marko Mladenović (from (Serbia) Vojvodina) |
| 10 | FW | GER | Robert Ramšak (from (Germany) RB Leipzig, previously on loan at (Germany) SV Sandhausen) |
| 11 | FW | NGR | Bede Osuji (from (India) Punjab) |
| 12 | DF | CRO | Ante Bekavac (from (Ukraine) Kryvbas Kryvyi Rih) |
| 23 | DF | SLO | Enej Kramberger (from Maribor youth, previously on loan at Ilirija 1911) |
| 25 | FW | SLO | Murat Bajraj (from Beltinci) |
| 27 | MF | SLO | Maj Blažič (from (Italy) Empoli Primavera) |
| 32 | DF | CRO | Vito Težak (from (Croatia) Varaždin, previously on loan at Beltinci) |
| 44 | MF | CRO | Petar Petriško (from Koper, previously on loan at (Bosnia and Herzegovina) Široki Brijeg) |
| 66 | GK | SLO | Lukas Tomažič (from Rudar Velenje) |
| 80 | DF | FRO | Hanus Sørensen (on loan from Celje, previously on loan at Triglav Kranj) |
| — | MF | NGR | Ammeer Suleiman Auwal (from (Croatia) Rudeš) |

Out:

| No. | Pos. | Nation | Player |
|---|---|---|---|
| 2 | DF | SLO | Gašper Pečnik (to (Austria) SC Weiz) |
| 3 | DF | SLO | Aleksandar Zeljković (to Mura) |
| 5 | DF | SLO | Amir Feratovič (to (Poland) Chrobry Głogów) |
| 6 | MF | SLO | Omar Kočar (to (Poland) Puszcza Niepołomice) |
| 7 | MF | GHA | Eric Taylor (loan return to Maribor) |
| 8 | MF | SLO | Rok Maher (to Brinje Grosuplje) |
| 10 | FW | SLO | Emir Saitoski (to (South Korea) Gwangju) |
| 11 | FW | MKD | Behar Feta (to Maribor) |
| 17 | DF | SLO | Filip Kosi (to (Bosnia and Herzegovina) Sarajevo) |
| 22 | GK | SLO | Matjaž Rozman (to Bravo) |
| 32 | GK | SLO | David Kramberger (on loan to Podvinci) |
| 35 | FW | SLO | Jure Boršič (on loan to Beltinci) |
| 36 | DF | SLO | Tjan Kolednik (to Hajdina) |
| 41 | DF | GRE | Stefanos Evangelou (to (Greece) Anagennisi Karditsa) |
| 42 | DF | SLO | Vid Koderman (to Maribor) |
| 44 | DF | SLO | Blaž Petriško (to (Croatia) Sloga Čakovec) |
| 66 | MF | SLO | Marko Simonič (to Bravo) |
| 77 | FW | CRO | Josip Pejić (to (Croatia) Rudeš) |
| 88 | DF | SLO | Uroš Korun (free agent) |
| 90 | FW | SLO | Noel Lan Koren (to Brinje Grosuplje) |
| 99 | FW | SRB | Andrej Stamenković (to (Serbia) Napredak Kruševac) |
| — | MF | NGR | Ammeer Suleiman Auwal (on loan to Hajdina) |
| — | DF | SLO | Tjan Kolednik (to Rogoza, previously on loan at Hajdina) |
| — | MF | SLO | Lan Mesarič (to Bistrica, previously on loan at Hajdina) |
| — | FW | SLO | Luka Pučnik (to Dravinja, previously on loan) |

=== Mura ===
In:

| No. | Pos. | Nation | Player |
|---|---|---|---|
| 3 | DF | SLO | Aleksandar Zeljković (from Aluminij) |
| 6 | MF | SLO | Florjan Jevšenak (on loan from Celje) |
| 9 | FW | CRO | Marko Aščić (on loan from (Croatia) Rijeka) |
| 14 | MF | SLO | Alen Kozar (from (Cyprus) Enosis Neon Paralimni) |
| 18 | MF | SLO | Aljaž Zalaznik (from Koper) |
| 24 | DF | CRO | Lovro Kitin (on loan from (Croatia) Rijeka) |
| 25 | GK | SLO | Adnan Golubović (from (Kosovo) Ballkani) |
| 30 | FW | SLO | Kenan Kurtović (on loan from (Turkey) Kasımpaşa) |
| 47 | FW | CRO | Šimun Butić (on loan from (Croatia) Rijeka, previously on loan at (Croatia) Vukovar 1991) |
| 49 | MF | CRO | Petar Pfeifer (from (Croatia) Rijeka youth) |
| 52 | GK | SLO | Matevž Dajčar (on loan from Olimpija Ljubljana) |
| 56 | DF | CRO | Matej Matić (from (Ukraine) Polissya Zhytomyr, previously on loan at (Poland) Polonia Bytom) |
| 71 | FW | BUL | Boris Dimitrov (free agent) |
| 77 | DF | ROU | Darius Oroian (from (Romania) Sepsi OSK) |
| — | FW | CAN | Federico Rose (from Tabor Sežana, previously on loan) |

Out:

| No. | Pos. | Nation | Player |
|---|---|---|---|
| 16 | MF | SLO | Luka Turudija (to Brinje Grosuplje) |
| 30 | FW | SLO | Kenan Kurtović (to (Turkey) Kasımpaşa) |
| 42 | DF | SLO | Matija Boben (loan return to Celje) |
| 44 | DF | AUT | Raphael Hofer (to Austria Salzburg) |
| — | FW | CAN | Federico Rose (to Olimpija Ljubljana) |

=== Brinje Grosuplje ===
In:

| No. | Pos. | Nation | Player |
|---|---|---|---|
| 18 | MF | SLO | Rok Maher (from Aluminij) |
| 22 | FW | SLO | Noel Lan Koren (from Aluminij) |
| 27 | MF | SLO | Jasmin Kurtić (from Olimpija Ljubljana) |
| 28 | DF | SLO | Matija Kavčič (on loan from Celje, previously on loan at (Poland) Stal Mielec) |
| — | MF | SLO | Luka Turudija (from Mura) |

Out:

| No. | Pos. | Nation | Player |

=== Nafta 1903 ===
In:

| No. | Pos. | Nation | Player |

Out:

| No. | Pos. | Nation | Player |

== See also ==
- 2026–27 Slovenian PrvaLiga
