= 2024–25 NK Maribor season =

65th season in existence of NK Maribor

NK Maribor
2024–25 season
- President: Drago Cotar
- Manager: Ante Šimundža (until 8 October 2024); Boštjan Cesar (since 14 October 2024)
- Stadium: Ljudski vrt
- Slovenian PrvaLiga: 2nd
- Slovenian Cup: Quarter-final
- UEFA Europa League: First qualifying round
- UEFA Conference League: Play-off round
- Top goalscorer: League: Benjamin Tetteh (11); All: Benjamin Tetteh (13)
- Highest home attendance: 9,650 vs Olimpija (25 August 2024)
- Lowest home attendance: 1,500 vs Aluminij (4 March 2025) and vs Radomlje (26 April 2025)
- Average home league attendance: 3,850
Home colours	Away colours

The 2024–25 season was the 65th season in the history of NK Maribor, and the club's 34th consecutive season in Slovenian PrvaLiga, the top tier of Slovenian football. In addition to the domestic league, the team also participated in the Slovenian Cup, the UEFA Europa League and the UEFA Conference League.

== Transfers and loans ==
=== Transfers in ===
Date	Position	Name	From	Fee	Ref.
2 July 2024	DF	(France) Bradley M'bondo	(France) Niort	Free transfer	
26 July 2024	FW	(Gabon) Orphé Mbina	(France) Nîmes	€300,000	
6 August 2024	DF	(Iraq) Adam Rasheed	(Italy) Torino	Free transfer	
6 September 2024	DF	(Portugal) André Sousa	(Portugal) Nacional	Free transfer	
6 September 2024	MF	(England) Sheyi Ojo	Free agent		
7 September 2024	DF	(Slovenia) Luka Krajnc	(Italy) Catanzaro	Undisclosed	
7 September 2024	FW	(Hungary) György Komáromi	(Hungary) Puskás Akadémia	€600,000	
2 January 2025	DF	(Tunisia) Omar Rekik	Free agent		
3 February 2025	FW	(Republic of Ireland) Ali Reghba	(North Macedonia) Rabotnichki	Undisclosed	

=== Transfers out ===
Date	Position	Name	To	Fee	Ref.
30 May 2024	MF	(Slovenia) Aleks Pihler	Released (Note: Joined Borac Banja Luka on 23 June 2024.)		
30 May 2024	DF	(Slovenia) Nemanja Mitrović	Released (Note: Joined SV Wildon on 17 July 2024.)		
30 May 2024	DF	(Japan) Itsuki Urata	Released (Note: Joined Bunyodkor on 29 July 2024.)		
30 May 2024	GK	(Slovenia) Marko Zalokar	Released (Note: Joined Krško Posavje on 6 August 2024.)		
30 May 2024	FW	(Nigeria) Ishaq Rafiu	Contract terminated (Note: Joined Primorje on 8 August 2024.)		
5 July 2024	DF	(Montenegro) Luka Uskoković	(Latvia) Liepāja	Free transfer	
17 July 2024	MF	(Croatia) Marin Laušić	(Latvia) Liepāja	Undisclosed	
19 July 2024	FW	(Croatia) Marko Kolar	(Croatia) Gorica	Free transfer	
19 July 2024	FW	(Angola) Érico Castro	Contract terminated (Note: Joined Fafe on 6 August 2024.)		
19 August 2024	MF	(Croatia) Alen Dizdarević	(Netherlands) Helmond Sport	Undisclosed	
30 August 2024	FW	(Austria) Arnel Jakupović	(Croatia) Osijek	€1 million	
5 September 2024	MF	(Slovenia) Marcel Lorber	(Slovenia) Domžale	Free transfer	
5 September 2024	DF	(Slovenia) Andraž Žinič	Contract terminated (Note: Joined Triglav Kranj on 10 September 2024.)		
6 September 2024	MF	(France) Redwan Bourlès	Contract terminated		
11 September 2024	DF	(Slovenia) Sven Karič	(Russia) Pari Nizhny Novgorod	€200,000	
9 January 2025	FW	(Ivory Coast) Etienne Beugre	(France) Bordeaux	Undisclosed	
27 January 2025	DF	(Slovenia) Mark Strajnar	(Slovenia) Domžale	Undisclosed	
28 January 2025	GK	(Slovenia) Samo Pridgar	(Slovenia) Radomlje	Free transfer	
17 February 2025	MF	(Slovenia) Maks Barišič	Contract terminated (Note: Joined Koper on 18 February 2025)		

=== Loans in ===
Start date	Position	Name	From	End date	Ref.
29 June 2024	MF	(Poland) Karol Borys	(Belgium) Westerlo	End of season	
6 September 2024	FW	(Ghana) Benjamin Tetteh	(France) Metz	End of season	
31 January 2025	MF	(Turkey) Bartuğ Elmaz	(Turkey) Fenerbahçe	End of season	
15 February 2025	FW	(Finland) Kai Meriluoto	(Finland) HJK Helsinki	End of season	

=== Loans out ===
Start date	Position	Name	To	End date	Ref.
25 June 2024	DF	(Slovenia) Mark Strajnar	(Slovenia) Mura	End of season (Note: Loan was terminated in January 2025, as Strajnar joined Domžale on a permanent basis.)	
19 July 2024	DF	(Slovenia) Luka Poredoš	(Slovenia) Bistrica	End of season	
7 September 2024	MF	(North Macedonia) Behar Feta	(Slovenia) Domžale	End of season	
8 January 2025	DF	(Slovenia) Gregor Sikošek	(Croatia) Gorica	End of season	
4 February 2025	FW	(Gabon) Orphé Mbina	(Portugal) União de Leiria	End of season	
15 February 2025	DF	(Slovenia) Lan Vidmar	(Slovenia) Koper	January 2026	
15 February 2025	MF	(Slovenia) Niko Osterc	(Slovenia) Beltinci	End of season	

== Friendlies ==
=== Pre-season ===
The pre-season program consisting of six friendlies was announced on 13 June.

19 June 2024 Friendly	Ormož	0–14	Maribor	Ormož
17:00 UTC+2		Report	Beugre 21'; Strajnar 26'; Jakupović 28', 32', 41'; Soudani 43'; Bourlès 46'; Prapotnik 52' (o.g.); Barišič 53'; Grlić 58'; Kolar 60' (pen.), 85'; Sikošek 72'; Ž. Repas 74'	Attendance: 650

22 June 2024 Friendly	Maribor (Slovenia)	2–1	(Slovakia) Spartak Trnava	Ormož
17:00 UTC+2	Barišič 9'; Paur 90+2' (o.g.)	Report	Paur 77'	Referee: Teo Glažar

25 June 2024 Friendly	Maribor (Slovenia)	3–0	(Montenegro) Budućnost Podgorica	Beltinci
17:00 UTC+2	Kolar 30'; Karič 68'; Milec 105'	Report		Stadium: Beltinci Sports Park; Referee: Slavko Nemet

28 June 2024 Friendly	Maribor (Slovenia)	2–2	(Albania) KF Egnatia	Beltinci
17:00 UTC+2	Bourlès 24'; Soudani 41'	Report	Spahiu 96'; Kasa 106'	Stadium: Beltinci Sports Park; Referee: Slavko Nemet

4 July 2024 Friendly	Maribor (Slovenia)	0–4	(Romania) Rapid București	Maribor
11:00 UTC+2		Report	Hasani 24', 49'; Jambor 68'; Gheorghe 87'	Stadium: Ljudski vrt Referee: Alen Borošak

4 July 2024 Friendly	Maribor (Slovenia)	2–1	(Bulgaria) CSKA 1948 Sofia	Beltinci
18:00 UTC+2	Milec 48'; Jakupović 83'	Report	Umarbayev 59'	Stadium: Beltinci Sports Park; Referee: Matej Kapun

=== Mid-season ===
As in previous seasons, Maribor spent the mid-season break preparing in Turkey, this time in Belek.

9 January 2025 Friendly	Maribor (Slovenia)	2–1	(Croatia) Istra 1961	Maribor
12:10 UTC+1	Soudani 20'; Grlić 58'	Report	Filet 75'	Stadium: Ljudski vrt Referee: Damjan Novarlič

16 January 2025 Friendly	Maribor (Slovenia)	0–2	(Ukraine) Dynamo Kyiv	Belek
11:00 UTC+3		Report	Guerrero 31'; Dyachuk 36'	Stadium: Kaya Palazzo

20 January 2025 Friendly	Maribor (Slovenia)	4–3	(Serbia) TSC	Belek
14:30 UTC+3	Mbina 60'; Ž. Repas 89'; Tetteh 112', 120'	Report	Banjac 47'; Lazetić 57'; Pantović 98'	Stadium: Calista Football Center

24 January 2025 Friendly	Maribor (Slovenia)	0–2	(Poland) Jagiellonia Białystok	Belek
11:00 UTC+3		Report	Diaby-Fadiga 37' (pen.), 62' (pen.)	Stadium: Cornelia Deluxe Resort

24 January 2025 Friendly	Maribor (Slovenia)	0–4	(Moldova) Zimbru Chișinău	Belek
17:30 UTC+3		Report	Ohajunwa 7'; Dahan 49'; Covali 73', 76'	Stadium: Kaya Palazzo

== Competitions ==
=== Overview ===
Competition	First match	Last match	Starting round	Record							
Competition	First match	Last match	Starting round	Pld	W	D	L	GF	GA	GD	Win %
Slovenian PrvaLiga	21 July 2024	25 May 2025	Matchday 1	36	19	10	7	64	32	+32	52.78
Slovenian Cup	25 September 2024	2 April 2025	Second round	4	3	0	1	8	2	+6	75.00
UEFA Europa League	11 July 2024	18 July 2024	First qualifying round	2	0	1	1	3	4	−1	0.00
UEFA Conference League	25 July 2024	29 August 2024	Second qualifying round	6	2	0	4	6	7	−1	33.33
Total				48	24	11	13	81	45	+36	50.00

Source: Soccerway

=== Slovenian PrvaLiga ===
==== League table ====
Pos	Team	Pld	W	D	L	GF	GA	GD	Pts	Qualification or relegation
1	Olimpija Ljubljana (C)	36	21	11	4	63	20	+43	74	Qualification for the Champions League first qualifying round
2	Maribor	36	19	10	7	64	32	+32	67	Qualification for the Conference League second qualifying round
3	Koper	36	19	9	8	60	35	+25	66	Qualification for the Conference League first qualifying round
4	Celje	36	17	10	9	76	51	+25	61	Qualification for the Europa League first qualifying round (Note: Celje qualified for the Europa League first qualifying round by winning the 2024–25 Slovenian Football Cup.)
5	Bravo	36	14	13	9	52	44	+8	55	

Source: PrvaLiga
Rules for classification: 1) Points; 2) Head-to-head points; 3) Head-to-head goal difference; 4) Head-to-head goals scored; 5) Goal difference; 6) Goals scored
(C) Champions

==== Results summary ====
Overall								Home						Away					
Pld	W	D	L	GF	GA	GD	Pts	W	D	L	GF	GA	GD	W	D	L	GF	GA	GD
36	19	10	7	64	32	+32	67	12	3	3	39	16	+23	7	7	4	25	16	+9

==== Results by round ====
Round	1	2	3	4	5	6	7	8	9	10	11	12	13	14	15	16	17	18	19	20	21	22	23	24	25	26	27	28	29	30	31	32	33	34	35	36
Ground	H	A	H	H	A	H	H	H	A	A	H	A	A	H	A	A	A	H	H	A	H	H	A	H	A	H	A	A	H	A	A	H	A	H	A	H
Result	W	L	D	W	D	D	W	W	W	W	L	W	D	W	D	L	D	W	W	W	L	W	W	W	L	W	D	L	D	D	W	W	W	W	D	L
Position	1	4	5	4	5	5	4	2	2	2	2	2	2	2	2	2	2	2	2	2	2	2	2	2	2	2	2	2	2	2	2	2	2	2	2	2

Source: PrvaLiga
A = Away; H = Home; W = Win; D = Draw; L = Loss

==== Matches ====
The match schedule was released on 27 June 2024.

21 July 2024 1	Maribor	4–1	Domžale	Maribor
17:30 UTC+2	Grlić 7'; Jakupović 26', 90+2'; Barišič 90+4'	Report	Krstovski 83' (pen.)	Stadium: Ljudski vrt Attendance: 2,150; Referee: Martin Matoša

18 September 2024 (Note: The match was originally scheduled for July, but was postponed and moved to 18 September due to matches in European competitions.) 2	Celje	2–1	Maribor	Celje
17:00 UTC+2	Kučys 27'; Sešlar 90'	Report	Komáromi 57'	Stadium: Stadion Z'dežele; Attendance: 3,480; Referee: Matej Jug

4 August 2024 3	Maribor	1–1	Bravo	Maribor
20:15 UTC+2	Beugre 18'	Report	Pečar 62'	Stadium: Ljudski vrt Attendance: 3,150; Referee: Denis Halilović

11 August 2024 4	Maribor	2–1	Mura	Maribor
20:15 UTC+2	Jakupović 21', 67'	Report	Proleta 5'	Stadium: Ljudski vrt Attendance: 4,750; Referee: Rade Obrenović

18 August 2024 5	Radomlje	1–1	Maribor	Domžale
17:30 UTC+2	Malenšek 61'	Report	Jakupović 29'	Stadium: Domžale Sports Park; Attendance: 350; Referee: Mihael Antič

25 August 2024 6	Maribor	1–1	Olimpija Ljubljana	Maribor
17:30 UTC+2	Ž. Repas 26'	Report	Lasickas 35'	Stadium: Ljudski vrt Attendance: 9,650; Referee: David Šmajc

1 September 2024 7	Maribor	4–1	Primorje	Maribor
17:30 UTC+2	Beugre 38'; Mbina 43', 90+2'; Sikošek 45+4'	Report	Smajlagić 20'	Stadium: Ljudski vrt Attendance: 2,300; Referee: Anže Jerič

15 September 2024 8	Maribor	2–0	Koper	Maribor
20:15 UTC+2	Mbina 22'; Božić 58'	Report		Stadium: Ljudski vrt Attendance: 2,500; Referee: Bojan Mertik

22 September 2024 9	Nafta 1903	0–3	Maribor	Lendava
17:30 UTC+2		Report	Grlić 56'; Beugre 59'; Božić 79'	Stadium: Lendava Sports Park; Attendance: 2,000; Referee: Mihael Antič

29 September 2024 10	Domžale	0–3	Maribor	Domžale
20:15 UTC+2		Report	Mbina 39'; Iličić 43' (pen.); Ž. Repas 84'	Stadium: Domžale Sports Park; Attendance: 600; Referee: Denis Šabanagić

6 October 2024 11	Maribor	1–2	Celje	Maribor
17:30 UTC+2	Krajnc 3'	Report	Kučys 61'; Edmilson 90+2'	Stadium: Ljudski vrt Attendance: 6,000; Referee: Rade Obrenović

20 October 2024 12	Bravo	0–1	Maribor	Ljubljana
15:00 UTC+2		Report	Soudani 84'	Stadium: Šiška Sports Park; Attendance: 1,000; Referee: Bojan Mertik

26 October 2024 13	Mura	1–1	Maribor	Murska Sobota
20:15 UTC+2	Maroša 35'	Report	Tetteh 90+3'	Stadium: Fazanerija City Stadium; Attendance: 2,750; Referee: Martin Matoša

2 November 2024 14	Maribor	1–0	Radomlje	Maribor
17:30 UTC+1	Mbina 20'	Report		Stadium: Ljudski vrt Attendance: 2,500; Referee: Denis Šabanagić

10 November 2024 15	Olimpija Ljubljana	0–0	Maribor	Ljubljana
15:00 UTC+1		Report		Stadium: Stožice Stadium; Attendance: 9,845; Referee: Mihael Antič

24 November 2024 16	Primorje	2–0	Maribor	Nova Gorica
17:30 UTC+1	Gulič 39'; Bešir 56'	Report		Stadium: Nova Gorica Sports Park; Attendance: 400; Referee: Rade Obrenović

30 November 2024 17	Koper	1–1	Maribor	Koper
15:00 UTC+1	El Manssouri 75'	Report	Tetteh 36'	Stadium: Bonifika Stadium; Attendance: 1,500; Referee: David Šmajc

8 December 2024 18	Maribor	4–0	Nafta 1903	Maribor
15:00 UTC+1	Božić 25', 75'; Tetteh 53'; Soudani 84'	Report		Stadium: Ljudski vrt Attendance: 2,500; Referee: Anže Jerič

1 February 2025 19	Maribor	2–1	Domžale	Maribor
17:30 UTC+1	Soudani 9', 41'	Report	Burić 76' (pen.)	Stadium: Ljudski vrt Attendance: 3,000; Referee: Alen Bubek

8 February 2025 20	Celje	1–2	Maribor	Celje
15:00 UTC+1	Kučys 64'	Report	Tetteh 23'; Elmaz 52'	Stadium: Stadion Z'dežele; Attendance: 2,850; Referee: David Šmajc

15 February 2025 21	Maribor	2–3	Bravo	Maribor
15:00 UTC+1	Ž. Repas 31'; J. Repas 39'	Report	Jovan 5', 59'; Poplatnik 80' (pen.)	Stadium: Ljudski vrt Attendance: 2,800; Referee: Bojan Mertik

22 February 2025 22	Maribor	2–0	Mura	Maribor
15:00 UTC+1	Soudani 11'; Tetteh 44'	Report		Stadium: Ljudski vrt Attendance: 3,800; Referee: Rade Obrenović

1 March 2025 23	Radomlje	0–4	Maribor	Domžale
15:00 UTC+1		Report	Grlić 20'; Tetteh 55'; Širvys 64'; Reghba 74'	Stadium: Domžale Sports Park; Attendance: 300; Referee: Martin Matoša

9 March 2025 24	Maribor	1–0	Olimpija Ljubljana	Maribor
15:00 UTC+1	Soudani 77'	Report		Stadium: Ljudski vrt Attendance: 9,500; Referee: David Šmajc

12 March 2025 25	Primorje	2–1	Maribor	Ajdovščina
15:00 UTC+1	Kadrić 7'; Zavnik 82' (pen.)	Report	Klemenčič 69' (o.g.)	Stadium: Ajdovščina City Stadium; Attendance: 350; Referee: Mihael Antič

16 March 2025 26	Maribor	4–2	Koper	Maribor
17:30 UTC+1	Tetteh 16' (pen.), 84'; Soudani 66'; Elmaz 77'	Report	Domgjoni 6'; T. Juric 19'	Stadium: Ljudski vrt Attendance: 2,200; Referee: Martin Matoša

16 April 2025 (Note: The match was originally scheduled for 29 March, but was postponed and moved to 16 April due to bad weather.) 27	Nafta 1903	1–1	Maribor	Lendava
17:30 UTC+2	Pihler 90'	Report	Soudani 8'	Stadium: Lendava Sports Park; Attendance: 1,100; Referee: Dejan Balažič

6 April 2025 28	Domžale	1–0	Maribor	Domžale
20:15 UTC+2	Perc 69'	Report		Stadium: Domžale Sports Park; Attendance: 300; Referee: Aleksandar Matković

7 May 2025 (Note: The match was originally scheduled for 9 April, but was postponed and moved to 7 May due to Celje's matches in UEFA Conference League.) 29	Maribor	1–1	Celje	Maribor
18:45 UTC+2	Ojo 30'	Report	Sešlar 43' (pen.)	Stadium: Ljudski vrt Attendance: 4,000; Referee: Dejan Balažič

13 April 2025 30	Bravo	1–1	Maribor	Ljubljana
20:15 UTC+2	Ivanšek 55'	Report	J. Repas 90+4' (pen.)	Stadium: Stožice Stadium; Attendance: 450; Referee: Mihael Antič

21 April 2025 31	Mura	1–2	Maribor	Murska Sobota
17:30 UTC+2	Maroša 66' (pen.)	Report	Meriluoto 82', 84'	Stadium: Fazanerija City Stadium; Attendance: 2,056; Referee: David Šmajc

26 April 2025 32	Maribor	4–0	Radomlje	Maribor
17:30 UTC+2	Rekik 52'; Soudani 55'; Meriluoto 74'; Viher 86'	Report		Stadium: Ljudski vrt Attendance: 1,500; Referee: Mateo Tozan

3 May 2025 33	Olimpija Ljubljana	1–2	Maribor	Ljubljana
20:15 UTC+2	Kojić 8'	Report	Çelhaka 15' (o.g.); Meriluoto 53'	Stadium: Stožice Stadium; Attendance: 9,000; Referee: Alen Bubek

11 May 2025 34	Maribor	3–1	Primorje	Maribor
17:30 UTC+2	Tetteh 5' (pen.), 76'; Ž. Repas 6'	Report	Bešir 82'	Stadium: Ljudski vrt Attendance: 2,500; Referee: Martin Matoša

18 May 2025 35	Koper	1–1	Maribor	Koper
20:15 UTC+2	Manseri 25'	Report	Tetteh 90+1' (pen.)	Stadium: Bonifika Stadium; Attendance: 900; Referee: Bojan Mertik

25 May 2025 36	Maribor	0–1	Nafta 1903	Maribor
15:00 UTC+2		Report	Dragóner 9'	Stadium: Ljudski vrt Attendance: 4,500; Referee: Denis Halilović

=== Slovenian Cup ===
==== Second round ====
25 September 2024 Second round	Marjeta	0–4	Maribor	Marjeta na Dravskem Polju
18:00 UTC+2		Report	Mbina 3'; M'bondo 7'; Sikošek 14'; Ojo 44'	Stadium: Igrišče Marjeta; Attendance: 2,000; Referee: Miha Kamplet

==== Round of 32 ====
30 October 2024 Round of 32	Preddvor	1–2	Maribor	Srednja Bela
14:00 UTC+1	Bunić 38'	Report	Tetteh 72'; Soudani 88'	Stadium: Preddvor Sports Park; Attendance: 1,200; Referee: Matej Jug

==== Round of 16 ====
4 March 2025 Round of 16	Maribor	2–0	Aluminij	Maribor
17:30 UTC+1	Tetteh 57'; Soudani 87'	Report		Stadium: Ljudski vrt Attendance: 1,500; Referee: Bojan Mertik

==== Quarter-final ====
2 April 2025 Quarter-final	Maribor	0–1	Celje	Maribor
19:00 UTC+2		Report	Delaurier-Chaubet 83'	Stadium: Ljudski vrt Attendance: 5,500; Referee: Rade Obrenović

=== UEFA Europa League ===
==== First qualifying round ====
11 July 2024 First leg	Botev Plovdiv (Bulgaria)	2–1	(Slovenia) Maribor	Plovdiv, Bulgaria
21:00 UTC+3	Ujah 9'; Iliev 74'	Report	Širvys 19'	Stadium: Stadion Hristo Botev; Attendance: 16,318; Referee: David Dickinson (Scotland)

18 July 2024 Second leg	Maribor (Slovenia)	2–2 (3–4 agg.)	(Bulgaria) Botev Plovdiv	Maribor, Slovenia
20:15 UTC+2	J. Repas 13'; Beugre 80'	Report	Nwachukwu 47'; Ujah 60'	Stadium: Ljudski vrt Attendance: 8,124; Referee: Vitaliy Romanov (Ukraine)

=== UEFA Conference League ===
==== Second qualifying round ====
25 July 2024 First leg	Maribor (Slovenia)	2–0	(Romania) Universitatea Craiova	Maribor, Slovenia
20:15 UTC+2	J. Repas 57'; Jakupović 88'	Report		Stadium: Ljudski vrt Attendance: 5,500; Referee: Mads Kristoffersen (Denmark)

1 August 2024 Second leg	Universitatea Craiova (Romania)	3–2 (3–4 agg.)	(Slovenia) Maribor	Craiova, Romania
20:00 UTC+3	Mitriță 52'; Grego 72'; Koljić 90+5'	Report	Iličić 68'; Jakupović 82'	Stadium: Ion Oblemenco Stadium; Attendance: 18,620; Referee: Jasmin Sabotic (Luxembourg)

==== Third qualifying round ====
8 August 2024 First leg	Maribor (Slovenia)	2–1	(Serbia) Vojvodina	Maribor, Slovenia
20:15 UTC+2	Iličić 59'; Soudani 90+8'	Report	Zady Sery 77'	Stadium: Ljudski vrt Attendance: 6,850; Referee: Daniel Stefański (Poland)

15 August 2024 Second leg	Vojvodina (Serbia)	1–0 (a.e.t.) (2–2 agg.) (2–4 p)	(Slovenia) Maribor	Bačka Topola, Serbia
20:00 UTC+2	Crnomarković 26'	Report		Stadium: TSC Arena; Attendance: 1,900; Referee: Gustavo Correia (Portugal)
	Penalties
	Petrović (penalty scored); Savićević (penalty scored); Nikolić (penalty missed); Ivanović (penalty missed)		(penalty scored) Mbina; (penalty scored) Soudani; (penalty scored) Repas; (penalty scored) Vrhovec

==== Play-off round ====
22 August 2024 First leg	Djurgården (Sweden)	1–0	(Slovenia) Maribor	Stockholm, Sweden
19:00 UTC+2	Nguen 69'	Report		Stadium: Tele2 Arena; Attendance: 12,579; Referee: Jasper Vergoote (Belgium)

29 August 2024 Second leg	Maribor (Slovenia)	0–1 (0–2 agg.)	(Sweden) Djurgården	Maribor, Slovenia
20:15 UTC+2		Report	Hümmet 4'	Stadium: Ljudski vrt Attendance: 8,150; Referee: Manfredas Lukjančukas (Lithuania)
