= List of Slovenian football transfers winter 2023–24 =

This is a list of Slovenian football transfers for the 2023–24 winter transfer window. Only transfers featuring Slovenian PrvaLiga are listed.

== Slovenian PrvaLiga ==
Note: Flags indicate national team as has been defined under FIFA eligibility rules. Players may hold more than one non-FIFA nationality.

=== Olimpija Ljubljana ===
In:

| No. | Pos. | Nation | Player |
|---|---|---|---|
| 19 | FW | CRO | Ivan Durdov (from (Belgium) Oostende, previously on loan at (Spain) Mirandés) |
| 36 | GK | SVN | Gal Lubej Fink (from Bravo) |
| 99 | FW | CRO | Antonio Marin (from (Croatia) Dinamo Zagreb) |

Out:

| No. | Pos. | Nation | Player |
|---|---|---|---|
| 25 | DF | SRB | Marko Mijailović (to (Serbia) Spartak Subotica) |
| 27 | DF | AUT | Pascal Estrada (to (Austria) SCR Altach) |
| 33 | MF | SVN | Nemanja Gavrić (to Radomlje) |
| 43 | DF | SVN | Aljaž Krefl (to Celje) |
| 99 | FW | POR | Rui Pedro (to (Turkey) Hatayspor) |
| — | FW | SVN | Tihomir Maksimović (on loan to Bravo, previously on loan at Krka) |

=== Celje ===
In:

| No. | Pos. | Nation | Player |
|---|---|---|---|
| 17 | FW | JAM | Rolando Aarons (free agent) |
| 23 | DF | SVN | Žan Karničnik (from (Bulgaria) Ludogorets Razgrad, previously on loan) |
| 43 | DF | SVN | Aljaž Krefl (from Olimpija Ljubljana) |
| 70 | FW | BIH | Luka Menalo (on loan from (Croatia) Dinamo Zagreb) |
| 90 | FW | NGA | Sunday Adetunji (on loan from (Serbia) Čukarički) |
| — | FW | NGA | Ibrahim Beji Muhammad (from (Nigeria) Mavlon) |

Out:

| No. | Pos. | Nation | Player |
|---|---|---|---|
| 5 | MF | BFA | Abdoul Bandaogo (to (Spain) Melilla) |
| 27 | FW | FRA | Julien Lamy (to Mura) |
| 35 | DF | SVN | Nejc Klašnja (to Radomlje) |
| 42 | DF | SVN | Vid Koderman (to Radomlje) |
| 77 | FW | SVN | Lovro Bizjak (to (Croatia) Kustošija) |
| 90 | FW | SVN | Domen Justinek (to Bistrica) |
| 92 | MF | SVN | Miha Sitar (on loan to Rudar Velenje) |
| — | MF | SVN | Dejan Kantužer (to Rogaška, previously on loan) |

=== Maribor ===
In:

| No. | Pos. | Nation | Player |
|---|---|---|---|
| 5 | DF | LTU | Pijus Širvys (from (Lithuania) Panevėžys) |
| 10 | MF | SVN | Maks Barišič (from Koper) |
| 11 | MF | FRA | Redwan Bourlès (free agent) |
| 13 | FW | CIV | Etienne Beugré (from (Ivory Coast) Denguélé) |
| 20 | MF | SVN | Žiga Repas (from Domžale) |
| 50 | DF | SVN | Lan Vidmar (from Bistrica) |

Out:

| No. | Pos. | Nation | Player |
|---|---|---|---|
| 40 | DF | ARG | Ignacio Guerrico (to (Argentina) Aldosivi) |

=== Domžale ===
In:

| No. | Pos. | Nation | Player |

Out:

| No. | Pos. | Nation | Player |
|---|---|---|---|
| 19 | MF | SVN | Žiga Repas (to Maribor) |

=== Mura ===
In:

| No. | Pos. | Nation | Player |
|---|---|---|---|
| 19 | FW | FRA | Julien Lamy (from Celje) |

Out:

| No. | Pos. | Nation | Player |

=== Koper ===
In:

| No. | Pos. | Nation | Player |

Out:

| No. | Pos. | Nation | Player |
|---|---|---|---|
| 22 | MF | SVN | Maks Barišič (to Maribor) |

=== Radomlje ===
In:

| No. | Pos. | Nation | Player |
|---|---|---|---|
| 13 | MF | SVN | Nemanja Gavrić (from Olimpija Ljubljana) |
| 35 | DF | SVN | Nejc Klašnja (from Celje) |
| 42 | DF | SVN | Vid Koderman (from Celje) |

Out:

| No. | Pos. | Nation | Player |

=== Bravo ===
In:

| No. | Pos. | Nation | Player |
|---|---|---|---|
| 14 | FW | SVN | Tihomir Maksimović (on loan from Olimpija Ljubljana, previously on loan at Krka) |

Out:

| No. | Pos. | Nation | Player |
|---|---|---|---|
| 22 | GK | SVN | Gal Lubej Fink (to Olimpija Ljubljana) |

=== Rogaška ===
In:

| No. | Pos. | Nation | Player |
|---|---|---|---|
| 17 | MF | SVN | Dejan Kantužer (from Celje, previously on loan) |

Out:

| No. | Pos. | Nation | Player |
|---|---|---|---|
| 17 | MF | SVN | Dejan Kantužer (on loan to Rudar Velenje) |

=== Aluminij ===
In:

| No. | Pos. | Nation | Player |

Out:

| No. | Pos. | Nation | Player |

== See also ==
- 2023–24 Slovenian PrvaLiga
