= 2020–21 Cardiff City F.C. season =

Welsh football club season

Cardiff City
2020–21 season
- Owner: Vincent Tan
- Chairman: Mehmet Dalman
- Manager: Neil Harris (until 21 January); Mick McCarthy (from 22 January)
- Stadium: Cardiff City Stadium
- Championship: 8th
- FA Cup: Third round
- EFL Cup: First round
- Welsh League Cup: Second round
- Top goalscorer: League: Kieffer Moore (20); All: Kieffer Moore (20)
- Biggest win: 4–0 vs. Luton Town (28 Nov 20); 4–0 vs. Birmingham City (1 May 21)
- Biggest defeat: 0–5 vs. Sheffield Wednesday (5 April 21)
Home colours	Away colours	Third colours

The 2020–21 season was the 122nd season in existence of Cardiff City Football Club. In addition to the Championship, Cardiff City participated in that season's editions of the FA Cup, the Welsh League Cup, and participated in the EFL Cup.

== First-team squad ==
As of 8 May 2021

Note: Flags indicate national team as has been defined under FIFA eligibility rules. Players may hold more than one non-FIFA nationality.

No.	Name	Nat.	Position(s)	Date of birth (age)	Apps.	Goals	Year signed	Signed from	Transfer fee	Ends
Goalkeepers
1	Dillon Phillips	(England)	GK	11 June 1995 (aged 26)	17	0	2020	(England) Charlton Athletic	Undisclosed	2023
12	Alex Smithies	(England)	GK	5 March 1990 (aged 31)	69	0	2018	(England) Queens Park Rangers	£4,000,000	2022
Defenders
2	Jordi Osei-Tutu	(England)	RB/RW	2 October 1998 (aged 22)	9	0	2020	(England) Arsenal	Loan	2021
3	Joe Bennett	(England)	LB	28 March 1990 (aged 31)	178	5	2016	(England) Aston Villa	Free	2021
4	Sean Morrison	(England)	CB	8 January 1991 (aged 30)	276	30	2014	(England) Reading	£3,180,000	2022
5	Aden Flint	(England)	CB	11 July 1989 (aged 31)	52	6	2019	(England) Middlesbrough	£4,000,000	2022
16	Curtis Nelson	(England)	CB	21 May 1993 (aged 28)	82	3	2019	(England) Oxford United	Free	2023
22	Sol Bamba	(Ivory Coast) (France)	CB	13 January 1985 (aged 36)	118	10	2016	Free agent	Free	2021
30	Ciaron Brown	(Northern Ireland) (England)	CB	14 January 1998 (aged 23)	13	0	2018	(England) Wealdstone	Trainee	2021
32	Joel Bagan	(Scotland) (England)	LB	3 September 2001 (aged 19)	9	0	2020	Academy	Trainee	2023
38	Perry Ng	(England)	RB/LB/CB	27 April 1996 (aged 25)	19	0	2021	(England) Crewe Alexandra	£350,000	2024
Midfielders
6	Will Vaulks	(Wales) (England)	DM	13 September 1993 (aged 27)	77	9	2019	(England) Rotherham United	£2,100,000	2022
7	Leandro Bacuna	(Curaçao)	CM/RB	21 August 1991 (aged 29)	100	3	2019	(England) Aston Villa	£4,000,000	2023
8	Joe Ralls	(England)	CM/LM	12 October 1993 (aged 27)	279	31	2011	Academy	Trainee	2022
11	Josh Murphy	(England)	LW/RW/SS	24 February 1995 (aged 26)	97	13	2018	(England) Norwich City	£11,000,000	2022
15	Jonny Williams	(Wales) (England)	AM/CM/LM	9 October 1993 (aged 27)	9	0	2021	(England) Charlton Athletic	Undisclosed	2021
21	Marlon Pack	(England)	CM/DM	25 March 1991 (aged 30)	83	4	2019	(England) Bristol City	Undisclosed	2022
23	Harry Wilson	(Wales)	RW/LW/AM	22 March 1997 (aged 24)	38	7	2020	(England) Liverpool	Loan	2021
27	Sheyi Ojo	(England)	RW/LW/AM	19 June 1997 (aged 24)	41	5	2020	(England) Liverpool	Loan	2021
28	Tom Sang	(England)	AM/RW/RB	29 June 1999 (aged 22)	11	0	2020	(England) Manchester United	Free	2023
33	Junior Hoilett	(Canada)	LW/RW/AM	5 June 1990 (aged 31)	184	25	2016	Free agent	Free	2021
34	Tavio Kouakou D'Almeida	(Ivory Coast)	CM	11 December 2000 (aged 20)	0	0	2019	(France) Auxerre	Free	2021
40	Rubin Colwill	(Wales)	AM/CM	27 April 2002 (aged 19)	6	0	2020	Academy	Trainee	2023
Forwards
10	Kieffer Moore	(Wales) (England)	CF	8 August 1992 (aged 28)	42	20	2020	(England) Wigan Athletic	£2,000,000	2023
14	Isaac Vassell	(England)	CF	9 September 1993 (aged 27)	3	1	2019	(England) Birmingham City	Undisclosed	2022
17	Lee Tomlin	(England)	SS	12 January 1989 (aged 32)	57	11	2017	(England) Bristol City	£2,900,000	2022
19	Max Watters	(England)	CF	23 March 1999 (aged 22)	3	0	2021	(England) Crawley Town	Undisclosed	2024
29	Mark Harris	(Wales)	CF/LW/RW	29 December 1998 (aged 22)	19	3	2017	Academy	Trainee	2023
39	Isaak Davies	(Wales)	CF	25 September 2001 (aged 19)	0	0	2020	Academy	Trainee	2023
Out on Loan
9	Robert Glatzel	(Germany)	CF	8 January 1994 (aged 27)	58	11	2019	(Germany) 1. FC Heidenheim	£5,500,000	2022
20	Gavin Whyte	(Northern Ireland)	RW	31 January 1996 (aged 25)	37	1	2019	(England) Oxford United	£2,000,000	2023
25	Joe Day	(England)	GK	13 August 1990 (aged 30)	2	0	2019	(Wales) Newport County	Free	2021

== Statistics ==
As of 8 May 2021
Players with names in italics and marked * were on loan from another club for the whole of their season with Cardiff City.

No.	Pos	Nat	Player	Total		Championship		FA Cup		League Cup	
No.	Pos	Nat	Player	Apps	Goals	Apps	Goals	Apps	Goals	Apps	Goals
1	GK	(England) ENG	Dillon Phillips	17	0	15+1	0	1+0	0	0+0	0
2	DF	(England) ENG	Jordi Osei-Tutu*	9	0	6+2	0	0+0	0	1+0	0
3	DF	(England) ENG	Joe Bennett	31	1	29+0	1	1+0	0	1+0	0
4	DF	(England) ENG	Sean Morrison	39	5	37+1	5	0+0	0	1+0	0
5	DF	(England) ENG	Aden Flint	22	1	22+0	1	0+0	0	0+0	0
6	MF	(Wales) WAL	Will Vaulks	43	5	36+6	5	1+0	0	0+0	0
7	MF	(Curaçao) CUW	Leandro Bacuna	44	2	32+10	2	1+0	0	1+0	0
8	MF	(England) ENG	Joe Ralls	40	5	34+5	5	1+0	0	0+0	0
10	FW	(Wales) WAL	Kieffer Moore	42	20	40+2	20	0+0	0	0+0	0
11	MF	(England) ENG	Josh Murphy	34	2	12+20	2	1+0	0	1+0	0
12	GK	(England) ENG	Alex Smithies	32	0	31+0	0	0+0	0	1+0	0
15	MF	(Wales) WAL	Jonny Williams	9	0	1+8	0	0+0	0	0+0	0
16	DF	(England) ENG	Curtis Nelson	46	1	44+0	1	1+0	0	1+0	0
17	FW	(England) ENG	Lee Tomlin	5	1	1+4	1	0+0	0	0+0	0
19	FW	(England) ENG	Max Watters	3	0	1+2	0	0+0	0	0+0	0
21	MF	(England) ENG	Marlon Pack	41	2	30+9	2	1+0	0	1+0	0
22	DF	(Ivory Coast) CIV	Sol Bamba	7	0	0+6	0	0+0	0	1+0	0
23	MF	(Wales) WAL	Harry Wilson*	38	7	33+4	7	1+0	0	0+0	0
27	MF	(England) ENG	Sheyi Ojo*	41	5	25+15	5	0+1	0	0+0	0
28	MF	(England) ENG	Tom Sang	10	0	8+1	0	0+0	0	0+1	0
29	FW	(Wales) WAL	Mark Harris	17	3	6+10	3	0+1	0	0+0	0
30	DF	(Northern Ireland) NIR	Ciaron Brown	12	0	11+1	0	0+0	0	0+0	0
32	DF	(Scotland) SCO	Joel Bagan	8	0	5+2	0	1+0	0	0+0	0
33	MF	(Canada) CAN	Junior Hoilett	23	2	15+6	2	0+1	0	1+0	0
38	DF	(England) ENG	Perry Ng	19	0	19+0	0	0+0	0	0+0	0
40	MF	(Wales) WAL	Rubin Colwill	6	0	3+3	0	0+0	0	0+0	0
Players out on loan:
9	FW	(Germany) GER	Robert Glatzel	23	3	9+12	3	1+0	0	1+0	0
20	MF	(Northern Ireland) NIR	Gavin Whyte	7	0	1+6	0	0+0	0	0+0	0
Players who left the club:
13	DF	(Croatia) CRO	Filip Benković*	1	0	0+1	0	0+0	0	0+0	0
18	DF	(Republic of Ireland) IRL	Greg Cunningham	5	0	3+1	0	0+0	0	0+1	0

=== Goals record ===
As of 8 May 2021

Rank	No.	Nat.	Po.	Name	Championship	FA Cup	League Cup	Total
1	10	(Wales)	CF	Kieffer Moore	20	0	0	20
2	23	(Wales)	RW	Harry Wilson	7	0	0	7
3	4	(England)	CB	Sean Morrison	5	0	0	5
3	6	(Wales)	DM	Will Vaulks	5	0	0	5
3	8	(England)	CM	Joe Ralls	5	0	0	5
3	27	(England)	RW	Sheyi Ojo	5	0	0	5
7	9	(Germany)	CF	Robert Glatzel	3	0	0	3
7	29	(Wales)	CF	Mark Harris	3	0	0	3
9	7	(Curaçao)	CM	Leandro Bacuna	2	0	0	2
9	11	(England)	LW	Josh Murphy	2	0	0	2
9	21	(England)	CM	Marlon Pack	2	0	0	2
9	33	(Canada)	LW	Junior Hoilett	2	0	0	2
12	3	(England)	LB	Joe Bennet	1	0	0	1
12	5	(England)	CB	Aden Flint	1	0	0	1
12	16	(England)	CB	Curtis Nelson	1	0	0	1
12	17	(England)	SS	Lee Tomlin	1	0	0	1
Own Goals					1	0	0	1
Total					66	0	0	66

=== Assists record ===
As of 8 May 2021

Rank	No.	Nat.	Po.	Name	Championship	FA Cup	League Cup	Total
1	23	(Wales)	RW	Harry Wilson	11	0	0	11
2	27	(England)	RW	Sheyi Ojo	7	0	0	7
4	11	(England)	LW	Josh Murphy	5	0	0	5
5	8	(England)	CM	Joe Ralls	4	0	0	4
6	38	(England)	RB	Perry Ng	3	0	0	3
7	3	(England)	LB	Joe Bennett	2	0	0	2
7	4	(England)	CB	Sean Morrison	2	0	0	2
7	6	(Wales)	DM	Will Vaulks	2	0	0	2
7	21	(England)	CM	Marlon Pack	2	0	0	2
7	33	(Canada)	LW	Junior Hoilett	2	0	0	2
11	5	(England)	CB	Aden Flint	1	0	0	1
11	7	(Curaçao)	CM	Leandro Bacuna	1	0	0	1
11	9	(Germany)	CF	Robert Glatzel	1	0	0	1
11	10	(Wales)	CF	Kieffer Moore	1	0	0	1
11	29	(Wales)	CF	Mark Harris	1	0	0	1
Total					45	0	0	45

=== Disciplinary record ===
As of 8 May 2021

Rank	No.	Nat.	Po.	Name	Championship			FA Cup			League Cup			Total		
Rank	No.	Nat.	Po.	Name	Booked	(yellow card) (yellow-red card)	Sent off (straight red)	Booked	(yellow card) (yellow-red card)	Sent off (straight red)	Booked	(yellow card) (yellow-red card)	Sent off (straight red)	Booked	(yellow card) (yellow-red card)	Sent off (straight red)
1	7	(Curaçao)	CM	Leandro Bacuna	8	0	0	0	0	0	1	0	0	9	0	0
2	4	(England)	CB	Sean Morrison	8	0	0	0	0	0	0	0	0	8	0	0
3	6	(Wales)	DM	Will Vaulks	6	0	1	0	0	0	0	0	0	6	0	1
3	8	(England)	CM	Joe Ralls	5	1	0	0	0	0	0	0	0	5	1	0
5	3	(England)	LB	Joe Bennett	6	0	0	0	0	0	0	0	0	6	0	0
5	16	(England)	CB	Curtis Nelson	6	0	0	0	0	0	0	0	0	6	0	0
5	21	(England)	CM	Marlon Pack	4	1	0	0	0	0	0	0	0	4	1	0
8	27	(England)	RW	Sheyi Ojo	5	0	0	0	0	0	0	0	0	5	0	0
9	5	(England)	CB	Aden Flint	4	0	0	0	0	0	0	0	0	4	0	0
9	10	(Wales)	CF	Kieffer Moore	4	0	0	0	0	0	0	0	0	4	0	0
9	30	(Northern Ireland)	CB	Ciaron Brown	4	0	0	0	0	0	0	0	0	4	0	0
9	38	(England)	RB	Perry Ng	3	0	0	0	0	0	0	0	0	3	0	0
13	11	(England)	LW	Josh Murphy	2	0	0	0	0	0	0	0	0	2	0	0
13	17	(England)	SS	Lee Tomlin	1	1	0	0	0	0	0	0	0	1	1	0
13	23	(Wales)	RW	Harry Wilson	3	0	0	0	0	0	0	0	0	3	0	0
13	28	(England)	AM	Tom Sang	1	0	0	0	0	0	1	0	0	2	0	0
13	33	(Canada)	LW	Junior Hoilett	2	0	0	0	0	0	1	0	0	3	0	0
17	1	(England)	GK	Dillon Phillips	1	0	0	0	0	0	0	0	0	1	0	0
17	15	(Wales)	AM	Jonny Williams	1	0	0	0	0	0	0	0	0	1	0	0
17	18	(Republic of Ireland)	LB	Greg Cunningham	1	0	0	0	0	0	0	0	0	1	0	0
Total					71	3	1	0	0	0	3	0	0	74	3	1

=== Clean sheets ===
Includes all competitive matches. The list is sorted by squad number when total clean sheets are equal. Numbers in parentheses represent games where both goalkeepers participated and both kept a clean sheet; the number in parentheses is awarded to the goalkeeper who was substituted on, whilst a full clean sheet is awarded to the goalkeeper who was on the field at the start of play.

As of match played 7 May 2021

Rank	No.	Nat.	Name	Matches played	Championship	FA Cup	EFL Cup	Total
1	12	(England)	Alex Smithies	32	8	0	0	8
2	1	(England)	Dillon Phillips	17	7	0	0	7

=== Contracts ===
Date	Position	Nationality	Name	Status	Contract Length	Expiry Date	Ref.
13 August 2020	LW	(Wales)	Mark Harris	Signed	1 Year	June 2021	
13 August 2020	AM	(England)	Tom Sang	Signed	1 Year	June 2021	
7 September 2020	CB	(England)	Curtis Nelson	Extended	2 years	June 2023	
5 November 2020	LB	(Scotland)	Joel Bagan	Signed	2 years	June 2023	
15 February 2021	AM	(Wales)	Rubin Colwill	Signed	2 years	June 2023	
15 February 2021	CF	(Wales)	Isaak Davies	Signed	2 years	June 2023	
17 March 2021	AM	(Wales)	Kieron Evans	Signed	2 years	June 2023	
17 March 2021	MF	(Wales)	Keenan Patten	Extended	1 year	June 2022	
12 April 2021	AM	(England)	Tom Sang	Signed	2 Years	June 2023	
19 May 2021	CF	(Wales)	Mark Harris	Signed	2 Years	June 2023	
16 June 2021	AM	(Wales)	Cian Ashford	Signed	3 years	June 2024	

== Transfers ==
=== Transfers in ===
Date from	Position	Nationality	Name	From	Fee	Ref.
13 August 2020	CF	(Wales)	Kieffer Moore	(England) Wigan Athletic	Undisclosed	
4 September 2020	CB	(Wales)	Oliver Denham	(England) Manchester United	Free transfer	
4 September 2020	CF	(England)	Chanka Zimba	(England) Blackburn Rovers	Free transfer	
21 September 2020	CM	(England)	Camron McWilliams	(England) Northampton Town	Free transfer	
21 September 2020	CM	(Republic of Ireland)	Rolan Idowu	(England) Southampton	Free transfer	
16 October 2020	GK	(England)	Dillon Phillips	(England) Charlton Athletic	Undisclosed	
16 January 2021	CF	(England)	Max Watters	(England) Crawley Town	Undisclosed	
19 January 2021	RB	(England)	Perry Ng	(England) Crewe Alexandra	£350,000	
1 February 2021	AM	(Wales)	Jonny Williams	(England) Charlton Athletic	Undisclosed	
17 March 2021	CB	(Nigeria)	Ibrahim Bakare	Free agent	Free	

=== Loans in ===
Date from	Position	Nationality	Name	From	Date until	Ref.
25 August 2020	RB	(England)	Jordi Osei-Tutu	(England) Arsenal	End of season	
7 September 2020	RW	(England)	Sheyi Ojo	(England) Liverpool	End of season	
16 October 2020	CB	(Croatia)	Filip Benković	(England) Leicester City	6 January 2021	
16 October 2020	RW	(Wales)	Harry Wilson	(England) Liverpool	End of season	

=== Loans out ===
Date from	Position	Nationality	Name	To	Date until	Ref.
21 July 2020	CB	(Northern Ireland)	Ciaron Brown	(Scotland) Livingston	29 January 2021	
1 August 2020	CM	(Republic of Ireland)	Aaron Bolger	(Republic of Ireland) Shamrock Rovers	October 2020	
10 August 2020	CF	(England)	Danny Williams	(England) Haverfordwest County	End of season	
16 September 2020	FW	(Wales)	James Waite	(England) Weston-super-Mare	End of season	
22 September 2020	AM	(England)	Tom Sang	(England) Cheltenham Town	4 January 2021	
16 October 2020	CB	(England)	Aden Flint	(England) Sheffield Wednesday	4 January 2021	
4 January 2021	GK	(England)	Joe Day	(England) Bristol Rovers	End of season	
14 January 2021	RW	(Northern Ireland)	Gavin Whyte	(England) Hull City	End of season	
28 January 2021	LB	(Republic of Ireland)	Greg Cunningham	(England) Preston North End	6 February 2021	
1 February 2021	CF	(Germany)	Robert Glatzel	(Germany) Mainz 05	End of Season	

=== Transfers out ===
Date from	Position	Nationality	Name	To	Fee	Ref.
1 July 2020	CF	(England)	Omar Bogle	(England) Charlton Athletic	Released	
1 July 2020	CB	(England)	Matthew Connolly	Unattached	Released	
1 July 2020	RB	(Wales)	Cameron Coxe	(England) Solihull Moors	Released	
1 July 2020	RB	(Wales)	Connor Davies	(Wales) Pen-y-Bont	Released	
1 July 2020	CM	(Wales)	Lloyd Humphries	(England) Weston-super-Mare	Released	
1 July 2020	CF	(England)	Shamar Moore	Unattached	Released	
1 July 2020	MF	(Wales)	Harry Pinchard	Unattached	Released	
1 July 2020	CB	(Wales)	Ryan Pryce	(Wales) Bala Town	Released	
1 July 2020	RB	(Wales)	Jazz Richards	(Wales) Haverfordwest County	Released	
1 July 2020	AM	(Wales)	Siôn Spence	Unattached	Released	
1 July 2020	CM	(England)	Laurence Wootton	(United States) Ohio State Buckeyes	Free transfer	
17 August 2020	CF	(England)	Danny Ward	(England) Huddersfield Town	Free transfer	
9 September 2020	RW	(England)	Nathaniel Mendez-Laing	(England) Middlesbrough	Contract Termination	
11 September 2020	GK	(Philippines)	Neil Etheridge	(England) Birmingham City	Undisclosed	
30 September 2020	CF	(Scotland)	Callum Paterson	(England) Sheffield Wednesday	Undisclosed	
6 February 2021	LB	(Republic of Ireland)	Greg Cunningham	(England) Preston North End	Undisclosed	

== Pre-season and friendlies ==
Win Draw Loss Fixtures

== Competitions ==
=== Overview ===
Competition	First match	Last match	Starting round	Record							
Competition	First match	Last match	Starting round	Pld	W	D	L	GF	GA	GD	Win %
EFL Championship	12 September 2020	May 2021	Matchday 1	46	18	14	14	66	49	+17	39.13
FA Cup	9 January 2021	9 January 2021	Third round	1	0	0	1	0	1	−1	0.00
EFL Cup	5 September 2020	5 September 2020	First round	1	0	0	1	0	3	−3	0.00
Welsh League Cup	11 December 2020		First round	1	1	0	0	2	0	+2	100.00
Total				49	19	14	16	68	53	+15	38.78

Last updated: 8 May 2021
Source: Competitions

=== EFL Championship ===
==== League table ====
Pos	Team	Pld	W	D	L	GF	GA	GD	Pts	Promotion, qualification or relegation
5	Barnsley	46	23	9	14	58	50	+8	78	Qualification for Championship play-offs
6	Bournemouth	46	22	11	13	73	46	+27	77	Qualification for Championship play-offs
7	Reading	46	19	13	14	62	54	+8	70	
8	Cardiff City	46	18	14	14	66	49	+17	68	
9	Queens Park Rangers	46	19	11	16	57	55	+2	68	
10	Middlesbrough	46	18	10	18	55	53	+2	64	
11	Millwall	46	15	17	14	47	52	−5	62	

Source: EFL Official Website
Rules for classification: 1) Points; 2) Goal difference; 3) Number of goals scored; 4) Head-to-head results; 5) Wins; 6) Away goals; 7) Penalty points (sec 9.5); 8) 12-point sending off offences

==== Results summary ====
Overall								Home						Away					
Pld	W	D	L	GF	GA	GD	Pts	W	D	L	GF	GA	GD	W	D	L	GF	GA	GD
46	18	14	14	66	49	+17	68	8	6	9	37	26	+11	10	8	5	29	23	+6

Last updated: 9 May 2021.

==== Results by matchday ====
Matchday	1	2	3	4	5	6	7	8	9	10	11	12	13	14	15	16	17	18	19	20	21	22	23	24	25	26	27	28	29	30	31	32	33	34	35	36	37	38	39	40	41	42	43	44	45	46
Ground	H	A	H	A	A	H	H	A	A	H	H	A	A	H	H	A	A	H	H	A	H	A	H	H	A	H	A	A	H	A	H	A	A	H	A	H	H	A	H	A	H	A	A	H	A	H
Result	L	W	L	D	W	D	D	D	L	W	L	D	L	W	W	W	W	L	W	L	L	L	L	L	D	D	W	W	W	W	W	W	D	W	D	L	D	W	L	L	D	D	D	W	W	D
Position	21	14	16	14	12	13	15	14	17	13	15	15	18	14	11	11	9	10	9	10	12	14	15	15	15	15	14	11	7	7	7	6	8	6	8	8	9	8	8	8	8	8	9	8	8	8

Updated to match(es) played on 8 May2021. Source:
A = Away; H = Home; W = Win; D = Draw; L = Loss

==== Matches ====
The 2020–21 season fixtures were released on 21 August.

12 September 2020 1	Cardiff City	0–2	Sheffield Wednesday	Cardiff
15:00 BST		Report	Windass 4'; Rhodes 44'; Luongo (yellow card) 74'	Stadium: Cardiff City Stadium; Attendance: 0 Referee: Andy Madley (Yorkshire)

19 September 2020 2	Nottingham Forest	0–2	Cardiff City	Nottingham
12:30 BST		Report	Moore 3', 40'	Stadium: City Ground; Attendance: 0 Referee: James Linington (Isle of Wight)
Note: Live on Sky Sports TV

26 September 2020 3	Cardiff City	1–2	Reading	Cardiff
15:00 BST	Hoilett (yellow card) 18'; Moore (yellow card) 53'; Tomlin 81'	Report	Morrison 47'; João 66'; Olise (yellow card) 90+4'	Stadium: Cardiff City Stadium; Attendance: 0 Referee: David Webb (Lancashire)

3 October 2020 4	Blackburn Rovers	0–0	Cardiff City	Blackburn
15:00 BST	Johnson (yellow card) 50'; Gallagher (yellow card) 80'	Report	Cunningham (yellow card) 34'; Bacuna (yellow card) 49'; Tomlin (yellow card) 59' (yellow-red card) 69'	Stadium: Ewood Park; Attendance: 0 Referee: Darren Bond (Lancashire)

18 October 2020 5	Preston North End	0–1	Cardiff City	Preston
12:00 BST	Browne (yellow card) 60'	Report	Ojo 52'	Stadium: Deepdale; Attendance: 0 Referee: Keith Stroud (Wessex)
Note: Live on Sky Sports TV

21 October 2020 6	Cardiff City	1–1	Bournemouth	Cardiff
19:45 BST	Morrison (yellow card) 66'; Wilson 62'; Ralls (yellow card) 90'	Report	Solanke 35'	Stadium: Cardiff City Stadium; Referee: Simon Hooper (Swindon)

24 October 2020 7	Cardiff City	1–1	Middlesbrough	Cardiff
15:00 BST	Moore (yellow card) 28'; Ojo 70'	Report	Saville 36'	Stadium: Cardiff City Stadium; Referee: John Brooks (Leicestershire)

28 October 2020 8	Derby County	1–1	Cardiff City	Derby
19:45 GMT	Waghorn 24'; Jóźwiak (yellow card) 82'; Shinnie (yellow card) 86' te Wierik (yellow card) 90'	Report	Moore 77'; Morrison (yellow card) 82'; Ojo (yellow card) 90+1'; Bacuna (yellow card) 90+3'	Stadium: Pride Park Stadium; Referee: Oliver Langford (West Midlands)

31 October 2020 9	Queens Park Rangers	3–2	Cardiff City	London
15:00 GMT	Chair 15', (yellow card) 15'; Kane 27', (yellow card) 45+3'; Cameron (yellow card) 31'; Barbet (yellow card) 48'; Ball 90+1'	Report	Ralls (yellow card) 22', (goal) 49' (pen.), 85'; Bacuna (yellow card) 38'; Tomlin (yellow card) 75'	Stadium: Loftus Road; Referee: Andy Woolmer (Northamptonshire)

3 November 2020 10	Cardiff City	3–0	Barnsley	Cardiff
19:45 GMT	Hoilett 4'; Ralls 45+1' (pen.); Wilson 77'	Report	James (yellow card) 39'	Stadium: Cardiff City Stadium; Referee: Dean Whitestone (Northampton)
Note: Live on Sky Sports TV

6 November 2020 11	Cardiff City	0–1	Bristol City	Cardiff
18:00 GMT	Pack (yellow card) 51'	Report	Martin 2' (yellow card) 45+1'	Stadium: Cardiff City Stadium; Referee: David Webb (Lancashire)
Note: Live on Sky Sports TV

21 November 2020 12	Millwall	1–1	Cardiff City	London
15:00 GMT	Smith 35'	BBC Report	Moore 79'	Stadium: The Den; Referee: Graham Scott (Oxfordshire)

25 November 2020 13	Coventry City	1–0	Cardiff City	Birmingham
19:45 GMT	Walker 54'	Report	Morrison (yellow card) 41'; Wilson (yellow card) 85'	Stadium: St Andrew's; Referee: Jeremy Simpson (Lancashire)

28 November 2020 14	Cardiff City	4–0	Luton Town	Cardiff
15:00 GMT	Nelson (yellow card) 4'; Morrison 5'; M Harris 9'; Moore 59'; Ojo 82'	Report		Stadium: Cardiff City Stadium; Referee: Josh Smith (Peterborough)

1 December 2020 15	Cardiff City	3–0	Huddersfield Town	Cardiff
19:00 GMT	Moore 35', 86'; Glatzel 85'; Bennett (yellow card) 90+3'	Report	Mbenza (yellow card) 87'	Stadium: Cardiff City Stadium; Referee: Kevin Friend (Leicester)

5 December 2020 16	Watford	0–1	Cardiff City	Watford
15:00 GMT	Perica (yellow card) 89'	Report	Moore 43'; Ojo (yellow card) 60'; Ralls (yellow card) 66'	Stadium: Vicarage Road; Attendance: 1,973; Referee: Steve Martin (Staffordshire)

8 December 2020 17	Stoke City	1–2	Cardiff City	Stoke-on-Trent
19:45 GMT	Morrison 25' (o.g.); Smith (yellow card) 62'; McClean (yellow card) 73'	Report	Glatzel 66'; Morrison 76'; Ojo (yellow card) 90+5'	Stadium: Bet365 Stadium; Referee: Tony Harrington (Hartlepool)
Note: Live on Sky Sports TV

12 December 2020 18	Cardiff City	0–2	Swansea City	Cardiff
12:30 GMT	Morrison (yellow card) 18'; Moore (yellow card) 35'; Ralls (yellow card) 46' (yellow-red card) 67'	BBC Report	Lowe 6', 72'; Bennett (yellow card) 14'; Guehi (yellow card) 35'	Stadium: Cardiff City Stadium; Referee: John Brooks (Leicestershire)
Note: Live on Sky Sports TV

16 December 2020 19	Cardiff City	3–2	Birmingham City	Cardiff
19:00 GMT	Glatzel 10'; Ojo (yellow card) 43'; Wilson 77'; Morrison 89'	BBC Report	Toral (yellow card) 21'; Roberts 31'; Colin (yellow card) 43'; Sánchez 57'	Stadium: Cardiff City Stadium; Referee: Michael Salisbury (Lancashire)

19 December 2020 20	Norwich City	2–0	Cardiff City	Norwich
12:30 GMT	Buendía 27'; Cantwell 70'	Report	Nelson (yellow card) 54'; Ojo (yellow card) 57'; Bacuna (yellow card) 82'; Wilson (yellow card) 90+4'	Stadium: Carrow Road; Attendance: 2,000; Referee: Tim Robinson (West Sussex)
Note: Live on Sky Sports TV

26 December 2020 21	Cardiff City	2–3	Brentford	Cardiff
15:00 GMT	Vaulks 45+4', 76', (yellow card) 55'	BBC Report	Canós 50', 65', 73'	Stadium: Cardiff City Stadium; Referee: Dean Whitestone (Northamptonshire)

29 December 2020 22	Wycombe Wanderers	2–1	Cardiff City	High Wycombe
19:45 GMT	Tafazolli 33'; Thompson (yellow card) 45+3'; Wheeler 63'; Ikpeazu (yellow card) 78'	BBC Report	Bennett (yellow card) 88'; Bacuna (yellow card) 90'; Hoilett 90+3'	Stadium: Adams Park; Referee: Leigh Doughty (Blackpool)

16 January 2021 23	Cardiff City	1–2	Norwich City	Cardiff
15:00 GMT	Bacuna (yellow card) 34'; Pack (yellow card) 54' (yellow-red card) 70'; Hoilett (yellow card) 57'; Ralls 65'; Harry Wilson	BBC Report	Hanley 3'; Cantwell 22'	Stadium: Cardiff City Stadium; Referee: Tony Harrington (Hartlepool)

20 January 2021 24	Cardiff City	0–1	Queens Park Rangers	Cardiff
19:00 GMT		Sky Sports Report	Barbet (yellow card) 36'; Cameron (yellow card) 48'; Willock 71'; Chair (yellow card) 89'	Stadium: Cardiff City Stadium; Referee: Darren Bond (Lancashire)

27 January 2021 25	Barnsley	2–2	Cardiff City	Barnsley
19:00 GMT	Andersen 20'; Woodrow 52'	BBC Report	Ojo 58'; Moore 68'	Stadium: Oakwell; Referee: Andy Woolmer (Northamptonshire)

30 January 2021 26	Cardiff City	1–1	Millwall	Cardiff
15:00 GMT	Bennett (yellow card) 69'; Moore 71'; Vaulks (yellow card) 76'; Morrison (yellow card) 84'	BBC Report	Flint 9' (o.g.)	Stadium: Cardiff City Stadium; Referee: Matt Donohue (Manchester)

6 February 2021 27	Bristol City	0–2	Cardiff City	Bristol
15:00 GMT		BBC Report	Nelson 18'; Moore 25'	Stadium: Ashton Gate Stadium; Referee: Jarred Gillett (Australia)

9 February 2021 28	Rotherham United	1–2	Cardiff City	Rotherham
19:00 GMT	Crooks 61'	BBC Report	Ojo 42'; Bennett 85'	Stadium: New York Stadium; Referee: Geoff Eltringham (Durham)

13 February 2021 29	Cardiff City	3–1	Coventry City	Cardiff
15:00 GMT	Moore 31', 38'; Murphy 46'; Flint (yellow card) 59'; Morrison (yellow card) 80'; Bennett (yellow card) 90+2'	BBC Report	Biamou (yellow card) 58'; Hyam 81'	Stadium: Cardiff City Stadium; Referee: James Linington (Isle of Wight)

16 February 2021 30	Luton Town	0–2	Cardiff City	Luton
20:15 GMT		BBC Report	Wilson 53'; Vaulks 57', (yellow card) 65'	Stadium: Kenilworth Road; Referee: Tim Robinson (West Sussex)
Note: Live on Sky Sports TV

20 February 2021 31	Cardiff City	4–0	Preston	Cardiff
15:00 GMT	Moore 2' (pen.); Murphy 46'; Flint (yellow card) 65'; Pack 71'; Harris 77'; Bennett (yellow card) 90+1'	BBC Report		Stadium: Cardiff City Stadium; Referee: Jeremy Simpson (Lancashire)

24 February 2021 32	Bournemouth	1–2	Cardiff City	Bournemouth
19:45 GMT	Billing (yellow card) 26'; Long 67'; Cook (yellow card) 76'; Kelly (yellow card) 90+1'	BBC Report	Nelson (yellow card) 26'; Morrison 28'; Moore 37' (pen.), (yellow card) 86'; Ng (yellow card) 77'; Flint (yellow card) 90'	Stadium: Dean Court; Referee: Gavin Ward (Surrey)

27 February 2021 33	Middlesbrough	1–1	Cardiff City	Middlesbrough
15:00 GMT	McNair 82'	BBC Report	Vaulks (yellow card) 30'; Morrison 37'; Bennett (yellow card) 57'; Ng (yellow card) 59'	Stadium: Riverside Stadium; Referee: Jarred Gillett (Australia)

2 March 2021 34	Cardiff City	4–0	Derby County	Cardiff
19:00 GMT	Bacuna 22' 56'; Moore 48'; Vaulks 90+3'	BBC Report		Stadium: Cardiff City Stadium; Referee: Dean Whitestone (Northamptonshire)

5 March 2021 35	Huddersfield Town	0–0	Cardiff City	Huddersfield
19:45 GMT		BBC Report		Stadium: Kirklees Stadium; Referee: Tim Robinson (West Sussex)
Note: Live on Sky Sports

13 March 2021 36	Cardiff City	1–2	Watford	Cardiff
15:00 GMT	Sierralta 14' (o.g.); Bacuna (yellow card) 81'; Ng (yellow card) 90+2'	Sky Sports Report	Chalobah 15'; Bachmann (yellow card) 39'; Hughes (yellow card) 45+1'; Sarr (yellow card) 82'; Sierralta (yellow card) 85'; Masina 90+3'	Stadium: Cardiff City Stadium; Referee: Keith Stroud (Wessex)

16 March 2021 37	Cardiff City	0–0	Stoke City	Cardiff
19:00 GMT	Pack (yellow card) 56'	BBC Report	Allen (yellow card) 88'	Stadium: Cardiff City Stadium; Referee: Graham Scott (Oxfordshire)
Note: Live on Sky Sports Red Button

20 March 2021 38	Swansea City	0–1	Cardiff City	Swansea
17:30 GMT		BBC Report	Flint 8'; Morrison (yellow card) 45+1'; Vaulks (yellow card) 81'; Brown (yellow card) 90+2'	Stadium: Liberty Stadium; Referee: Paul Tierney (Wigan)
Note: Live on Sky Sports

2 April 2021 39	Cardiff City	0–1	Nottingham Forest	Cardiff
15:00 BST	Pack (yellow card) 14'; Brown (yellow card) 37'	Sky Report; BBC Report	Christie (yellow card) 26'; Garner 29'; Grabban (yellow card) 55'; Cafú (yellow card) 87'	Stadium: Cardiff City Stadium; Referee: Gavin Ward (Surrey)

5 April 2021 40	Sheffield Wednesday	5–0	Cardiff City	Sheffield
17:30 BST	Börner 4'; Paterson 20'; Reach 23', 69'; Rhodes 65'	BBC Report		Stadium: Hillsborough Stadium; Referee: David Webb (Lancashire)
Note: Live on Sky Sports

10 April 2021 41	Cardiff City	2–2	Blackburn Rovers	Cardiff
15:00 BST	Vaulks 27'; Ralls 70'	BBC Report	Armstrong 43', 90'	Stadium: Cardiff City Stadium; Referee: Jeremy Simpson (Lancashire)

16 April 2021 42	Reading	1–1	Cardiff City	Reading
18:00 BST	Meite 90+4'	BBC Report	Moore 87' (pen.)	Stadium: Madejski Stadium; Referee: John Brooks (Leicestershire)
Note: Live on Sky Sports

20 April 2021 43	Brentford	1–1	Cardiff City	London
18:00 BST	Fosu-Henry 63', (yellow card) 87'; Canós (yellow card) 90'	BBC Report	Moore 57' (pen.)	Stadium: Brentford Community Stadium; Referee: Darren England (Yorkshire)
Note: Live on Sky Sports

24 April 2021 44	Cardiff City	2–1	Wycombe Wanderers	Cardiff
15:00 BST	Moore 22', 71'; Vaulks (red card) 90+5'	BBC Report	Jacobson 43' (pen.)	Stadium: Cardiff City Stadium; Referee: Matt Donohue (Manchester)

1 May 2021 45	Birmingham City	0–4	Cardiff City	Birmingham
15:00 BST	Dean (yellow card) 84'	BBC Report	Wilson 9', 40', 86'; Pack (yellow card) 61'; M Harris 68'	Stadium: St Andrew's; Referee: Andy Davies (Hampshire)

8 May 2021 46	Cardiff City	1–1	Rotherham	Cardiff
12:30 BST	Ralls (yellow card) 52'; Pack 88'	BBC Report	Wing 5'; Ihiekwe (yellow card) 39'; Wiles (yellow card) 70'	Stadium: Cardiff City Stadium; Referee: Graham Scott (Oxfordshire)

=== FA Cup ===
The third round draw was made on 30 November, with Premier League and EFL Championship clubs all entering the competition.

9 January 2021 Third round	Nottingham Forest	1–0	Cardiff City	West Bridgford
12:00 GMT	Taylor 3'	Report		Stadium: The City Ground; Attendance: 0 Referee: David Webb
Note: Live on BT Sports Extra 4

=== EFL Cup ===
The first round draw was made on 18 August, live on Sky Sports, by Paul Merson.

5 September 2020 First round	Northampton Town	3–0	Cardiff City	Northampton
15:00 BST	Korboa (yellow card) 23'; Smith 33' (pen.); Horsfall (yellow card) 46'; Warburton 49' (yellow card) 61'; Watson (yellow card) 57' (goal) 59'	Report	Bacuna (yellow card) 27'; Hoilett (yellow card) 40'; Sang (yellow card) 79'	Stadium: PTS Academy Stadium; Attendance: 0 Referee: Darren Drysdale

=== Welsh League Cup ===
Cardiff entered the Welsh League Cup for the first time in the club's history in the 2020–21 season.

11 December 2020 First round	Taff's Well	0–2	Cardiff City	Taff's Well
19:45 GMT	Evans 44'; I Davies 79'			Stadium: USW Sports Park

== Summary ==
Games played	49 (46 EFL Championship, 1 FA Cup, 1 League Cup, 1 Welsh League Cup)
Games won	19 (18 EFL Championship, 0 FA Cup, 0 League Cup, 1 Welsh League Cup)
Games drawn	14 (14 EFL Championship, 0 FA Cup, 0 League Cup)
Games lost	16 (14 EFL Championship, 1 FA Cup, 1 League Cup)
Goals scored	68 (66 EFL Championship, 0 FA Cup, 0 League Cup, 2 Welsh League Cup)
Goals conceded	53 (49 EFL Championship, 1 FA Cup, 3 League Cup)
Goal difference	15
Clean sheets	15 (14 EFL Championship, 0 FA Cup, 0 League Cup, 1 Welsh League Cup)
Yellow cards	75 (70 EFL Championship, 0 FA Cup, 3 League Cup, 2 Welsh League Cup)
Red cards	4 (4 EFL Championship, 0 FA Cup, 0 League Cup)
Worst Discipline	(Curaçao) Leandro Bacuna (8 (yellow card) , 0 (yellow card) (yellow-red card) , 0 (red card) )
Best result	4–0 vs. Luton Town (28 Nov 20); 4–0 vs. Preston North End (20 Feb 21); 4–0 vs. Derby County (2 Mar 21); 4–0 vs. Birmingham City (1 May 21)
Worst result	0–5 vs. Sheffield Wednesday (8 Apr 21)
Most appearances	(England) Curtis Nelson (46 starts, 0 subs)
Top scorer	(Wales) Kieffer Moore (20)
Most Clean Sheets	(England) Dillon Phillips (7) (England) Alex Smithies (7)
Points	68

== Club staff ==
=== Backroom staff ===
Position	Name
Manager	(Republic of Ireland) Mick McCarthy
Assistant manager	(England) Terry Connor
First-team coach	(Wales) James Rowberry
Goalkeeper coach	(Wales) Andy Dibble
Head of medical services	(England) Matthew May
Club doctor	(Wales) Dr. Len Nokes
First-team physiotherapist	(Wales) James Rowland
Head of Fitness & Conditioning	(England) Lee Southernwood
Senior Strength & Conditioning	(Wales) Mike Beere
Sports scientist	(Wales) Ben Parry
Head scout	(England) Glyn Chamberlain
First Team Analyst	(Wales) Jack Radusin
Player Liaison Officer	(Wales) Jack Osmond-Smith
Kit and Equipment Manager	(Wales) Paul Carter

=== Board of directors ===
Position	Name
Chairman	(Cyprus) Mehmet Dalman
General Manager	(Malaysia) Ken Choo
Finance Director	(Wales) Philip Jenkins
Non-Executive; Board Members; Football Club	(Wales) Steve Borley (since 1998) (Malaysia) Derek Chee Seng Chin (since 2010) (Malaysia) Veh Ken Choo (since 2016) (Cyprus) Mehmet Dalman (since 2012) (United Kingdom) Marco Ronaldo Mario Caramella (since 2017)
Non-Executive; Board Members; Cardiff City (Holdings)	(Malaysia) Danni Rais (since 2012)
Club Secretary	(England) Michelle McDonald
