= Tom Sang =

English footballer (born 1999)

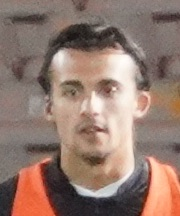
- Sang with Port Vale in 2023

Personal information
- Full name: Thomas Roy Sang
- Date of birth: 29 June 1999 (age 27)
- Place of birth: Liverpool, England
- Height: 6 ft 2 in (1.88 m)
- Positions: Defensive midfielder; right-back

Team information
- Current team: Shrewsbury Town
- Number: 10

Youth career
- 2011–2013: Bolton Wanderers
- 2015–2018: Manchester United

Senior career*
Years	Team	Apps	(Gls)
2018–2019	Manchester United	0	(0)
2019	→ AFC Fylde (loan)	0	(0)
2019–2023	Cardiff City	21	(0)
2020–2021	→ Cheltenham Town (loan)	10	(0)
2022	→ St Johnstone (loan)	9	(0)
2023–2025	Port Vale	66	(0)
2025–	Shrewsbury Town	36	(2)
- * Club domestic league appearances and goals as of 18:10, 5 May 2026 (UTC)

Thomas Roy Sang (born 29 June 1999) is an English professional footballer who plays for EFL League Two club Shrewsbury Town. A versatile defensive midfielder, he can also play at right-back. His father, Neil, played professional football.

Sang began his career in the youth team at Bolton Wanderers before joining Manchester United following a successful trial in 2019. He spent the second half of the 2018–19 season on loan at AFC Fylde and signed with Cardiff City following a trial spell. He spent time on loan at Cheltenham Town and St Johnstone before moving to Port Vale on a free transfer in July 2023. He was promoted out of League Two with the club at the end of the 2024–25 season. He joined Shrewsbury Town in June 2025.

== Early life ==
Thomas Roy Sang was born in Liverpool on 29 June 1999. His father, Neil Sang, is a former professional football player and agent. It was reported that his grandfather was Malaysian, giving him eligibility to represent Malaysia internationally.

== Club career ==
=== Early career ===
Sang began his career with Bolton Wanderers at under-13 level, but was released after his under-14 season. He spent 18 months without a club, during which time he struggled with injuries, before signing for Manchester United in 2015 after a successful trial; he later turned professional at the club, signing a contract extension in May 2018. United coach Kieran McKenna said that he was a "hard-working and diligent lad" after manager José Mourinho called him up to train with the first-team in October 2018. In January 2019, Sang joined AFC Fylde on loan for the remainder of the 2018–19 season; Dave Challinor's side were fourth in the National League at the time. However, he did not feature in the league or in the 2019 FA Trophy final victory over Leyton Orient.

=== Cardiff City ===
Sang was released by Manchester United in the summer of 2019 and subsequently signed for EFL Championship club Cardiff City after a trial period. He made his professional debut after coming on as a substitute for Gavin Whyte in a penalty shoot-out defeat to Reading in the FA Cup on 4 February 2020.

On 22 September 2020, he joined EFL League Two side Cheltenham Town on loan until January 2021. He made his first Football League appearance for Cheltenham in a 2–0 win over Crawley Town at Whaddon Road on 10 October. He made 14 appearances in all competitions for Cheltenham before returning to Cardiff in January 2021, winning praise from Cheltenham manager Michael Duff for his dedication and enthusiasm. He had started just three league games for Cheltenham, playing largely in an attacking central midfield role, though Cardiff manager Neil Harris noted that Cheltenham had been in excellent form. He had also been used at right-back towards the end of his loan spell and later acknowledged that he had learnt a lot despite initially being disappointed with the amount of gametime he had at Whaddon Road.

He made his league debut for Cardiff on 5 March 2021, playing as right-back in a 0–0 draw away at Huddersfield Town. He signed a new two-year deal the following month. He was preferred to Perry Ng at right-back by manager Mick McCarthy towards the end of the 2020–21 season. However, speaking in January 2022, new manager Steve Morison said that he saw Sang as a central midfield player, leaving him to compete with Joe Ralls, Will Vaulks, Marlon Pack, Leandro Bacuna, Sam Bowen and Ryan Wintle for one of three available places in the starting eleven. On 31 January, Sang joined Scottish Premiership club St Johnstone on loan until the end of the 2021–22 season. He impressed during his home debut at McDiarmid Park, showing "ambition, energy and a willingness to advance deep into opposition territory" throughout a 2–1 win over Heart of Midlothian after starting the sequence of play that led to Ali Crawford's opening goal within the first minute of the match; an Opta Sports analysis showed him to be a key performer in the game. He played nine games for Callum Davidson's Saints, mainly at right-back, though was an unused substitute in both legs of the play-off victory over Inverness Caledonian Thistle.

He impressed Cardiff manager Steve Morison by playing in central midfield during friendly games in summer 2022, though he faced competition from Joe Ralls, Andy Rinomhota, Romaine Sawyers, Rubin Colwill, Ryan Wintle, Eli King and Ebou Adams for a starting place. He was not utilised by manager Sabri Lamouchi in the second half of the 2022–23 season. Sang made 18 starts and nine substitute appearances during a four-year stay at the Cardiff City Stadium.

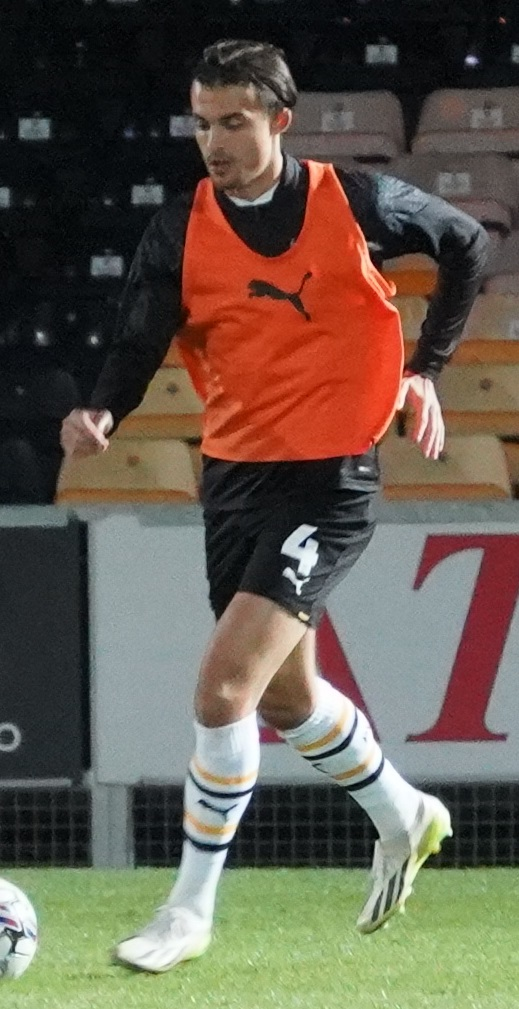
Sang warming up for Port Vale in October 2023

=== Port Vale ===
On 12 June 2023, Sang signed a two-year deal with EFL League One club Port Vale to run from 1 July. Manager Andy Crosby said that "his versatility will give us options", whilst the club's director of football, David Flitcroft, said that "he will add a different dimension to our midfield". An injury crises left him playing out of position at left-wing-back in November. However, he adapted well to the role as a right-footed player. Sang himself was injured at the end of the calendar year, as an Achilles tendon problem saw him sidelined for a few weeks. He adapted well to playing at full-back when new manager Darren Moore switched to a back four in February. He adapted well to being played on the right of a back three in a 0–0 draw at Wigan Athletic on 6 April.

He scored his first career goal on 13 August 2024, in a 3–2 defeat at Barrow in the EFL Cup. Moore played him on the right of a back three against Swindon Town on 28 September and played well, being given to room to allow his long passes to create chances. He was named on the EFL Team of the Week for his performance, having made six key passes, won six aerial duels and collecting an assist. He remained a key player at wingback following injury to Kyle John. In November he started two games in central midfield and another two on the right of the back three, winning praise for his defensive performance in the 1–1 draw with local rivals Crewe Alexandra. He was sent off for violent conduct following a clash with Antoni Sarcevic in the Boxing day defeat at Bradford City. He returned to the starting line-up the following month, by which point he had played in nine different positions – right and left back, right and left-wing back, right and left of a back three, central midfield, right of a midfield four and right of a front three – during his Vale career. He was again shown a straight red card on 1 February after a high challenge on Ashley Hunter in a 2–1 home win over Accrington Stanley. He dislocated his shoulder in a win at Crewe Alexandra at the end of March and was ruled out for the rest of the 2024–25 season. He played 28 league games in the campaign, helping the team to secure an automatic promotion place. He was released upon the expiry of his contract.

=== Shrewsbury Town ===
On 27 June 2025, Sang agreed a two-year deal with League Two club Shrewsbury Town. He was signed to compete with Luca Hoole for the right wing-back or full-back position, as well as Sam Clucas, Taylor Perry, Alex Gilliead and Harrison Biggins in the centre of Michael Appleton's midfield. On 12 August, he scored his second career goal in a 3–2 defeat at Grimsby Town in the EFL Cup. He missed a month of football after sustaining a hamstring injury in April. Nevertheless, he said he enjoyed the end of the campaign under new manager Gavin Cowan as compared to the "brutal" start to the campaign. He played 42 games in the 2025–26 season, scoring four goals. Cowan compared him to David Beckham.

== Style of play ==
Sang is a versatile midfielder who is also able to play at right-back or as an attacking wing-back. Attacking from the wings he can cut inside and whip in dangerous, inswinging crosses.

== Career statistics ==
As of match played 2 May 2026

Appearances and goals by club, season and competition
Club	Season	League			FA Cup		EFL Cup		Other		Total	
Club	Season	Division	Apps	Goals	Apps	Goals	Apps	Goals	Apps	Goals	Apps	Goals
Manchester United	2018–19	Premier League	0	0	0	0	0	0	0	0	0	0
AFC Fylde (loan)	2018–19	National League	0	0	0	0	—		1 (Note: Appearance in FA Trophy)	0	1	0
Cardiff City	2019–20	EFL Championship	0	0	1	0	0	0	—		1	0
Cardiff City	2020–21	EFL Championship	9	0	0	0	1	0	—		10	0
Cardiff City	2021–22	EFL Championship	3	0	1	0	1	0	—		5	0
Cardiff City	2022–23	EFL Championship	9	0	2	0	1	0	—		12	0
Cardiff City	Total		21	0	4	0	3	0	—		28	0
Cheltenham Town (loan)	2020–21	EFL League Two	10	0	1	0	—		3 (Note: Appearance(s) in EFL Trophy)	0	14	0
St Johnstone (loan)	2021–22	Scottish Premiership	9	0	—		—		—		9	0
Port Vale	2023–24	EFL League One	38	0	4	0	5	0	1	0	48	0
Port Vale	2024–25	EFL League Two	28	0	1	0	1	1	2	0	32	1
Port Vale	Total		66	0	5	0	6	1	3	0	80	1
Shrewsbury Town	2025–26	EFL League Two	36	2	2	1	1	1	3	0	42	4
Shrewsbury Town	2026–27	EFL League Two	0	0	0	0	0	0	0	0	0	0
Shrewsbury Town	Total		36	2	2	1	1	1	3	0	42	4
Career total			142	2	12	1	10	2	10	0	174	5

== Honours ==
Port Vale

- EFL League Two second-place promotion: 2024–25
