= Neil Sang =

English footballer

Personal information
- Date of birth: 23 May 1972 (age 54)
- Place of birth: Liverpool, England
- Position: Midfielder

Youth career
- 1987–1990: Everton

Senior career*
Years	Team	Apps	(Gls)
1990–1991	Everton	0	(0)
1991–1992	Torquay United	14	(0)
1992–19??	Runcorn		
1994	Macclesfield Town	0	(0)
- Caernarfon Town
- Bangor City
- Chorley
- Marine
- * Club domestic league appearances and goals

Neil Sang (born 23 May 1972) is an English former professional footballer who played in the Football League for Torquay United. He went on to work as a football agent and currently represents Tom Davies who plays for Everton His son Tom is a footballer, who plays for Port Vale.

== Footballer ==
Sang began his career as a trainee with Everton. He also played in Leagues One and Two for Torquay United, for Caernarfon Town and then signed for Bangor City in the 1997 close season where he played under former Everton legend Graeme Sharp. Sharp mentions this fact in his Autobiography (page 255): "I also brought a player called Neil Sang to the club. Sangy had been a young reserve during my latter years at Everton, but he hadn't managed to break into the first team, which was a bit of a surprise because he had all the attributes to be a class footballer."

In 1998, he was playing alongside Lee Trundle for Chorley, while by December 1998 he was playing for Marine. He also had spells at Conference clubs Macclesfield Town and Morecambe FC.

== Licensed agent ==
At 26 he became the youngest FIFA-licensed football agent in the world at the time when he acquired his licence in 1999. Clients include Danny Cadamarteri, Geremi, Kevin McLeod, Richie Partridge, Lee Trundle and Mark Wilson.

In 1999, he set up a company, Sportstar Promotions, based in Speke, which he is managing director of.

In 2005, Sang negotiated what was believed to be the first image rights deal outside the Premier League, when Lee Trundle signed an agreement with Swansea City, then of Football League One.

== Radio pundit ==
Sang offered his views on football and transfer dealings on Terrace Talk which was a weekly Saturday afternoon radio show hosted by Phil Cooper or Toby Gilles, Liverpool legend Ian St John and former Everton defender Ian Snodin. The show aired on Liverpool's Radio City 96.7 FM.

He also has his own show in conjunction with Bury FC player, Ryan Lowe.
