= Sven Karič =

Slovenian footballer (born 1998)

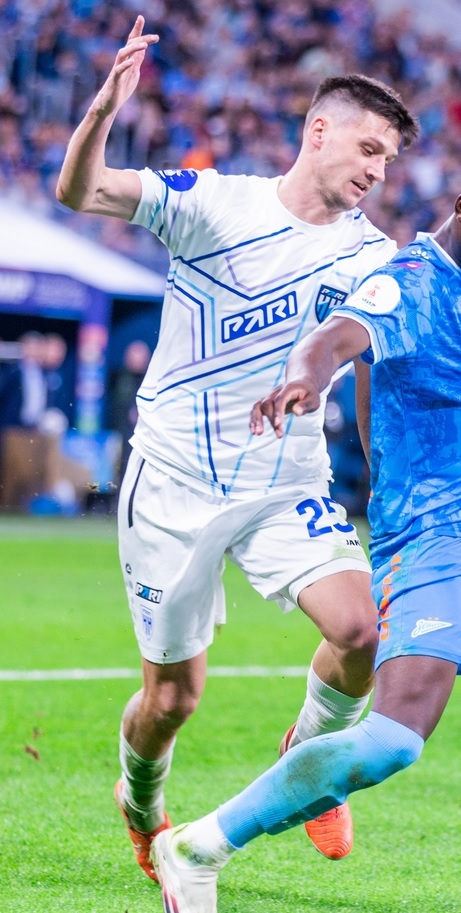
- Karič with Pari Nizhny Novgorod in 2025

Personal information
- Full name: Sven Šoštarič Karič
- Date of birth: 7 March 1998 (age 28)
- Place of birth: Slovenia
- Height: 1.86 m (6 ft 1 in)
- Position: Defender

Team information
- Current team: Pari Nizhny Novgorod
- Number: 25

Youth career
- Pobrežje
- 2011–2016: Maribor

Senior career*
Years	Team	Apps	(Gls)
2017–2019	Derby County	0	(0)
2019	→ Braintree Town (loan)	6	(0)
2019–2022	Domžale	86	(6)
2022–2024	Maribor	64	(4)
2024–	Pari Nizhny Novgorod	50	(2)

International career^{‡}
2015	Slovenia U17 (Note: Official UEFA competitive matches only.)	4	(0)
2015–2016	Slovenia U19	9	(0)
2019–2021	Slovenia U21	8	(0)
2021–	Slovenia	2	(0)
- * Club domestic league appearances and goals as of 17 May 2026 ‡ National team caps and goals as of 10 June 2025

Sven Šoštarič Karič (born 7 March 1998) is a Slovenian footballer who plays for Russian Premier League club Pari Nizhny Novgorod and Slovenia national team as a defender.

== Club career ==
In early 2017, Karič signed for Derby County of the Championship after trialing with Croatian team Dinamo Zagreb and refusing a professional contract from Slovenian side Maribor. In March 2019, he was sent on loan to Braintree Town in the English fifth division.

Karič returned to Slovenia in July 2019 and signed for Domžale. He stayed at Domžale for three years, before re-joining his childhood club Maribor in 2022 on a contract until 2025.

On 11 September 2024, Karič moved abroad again and signed with Pari Nizhny Novgorod, joining his countrymen Luka Vešner Tičić at the Russian Premier League club.

== International career ==
Karič debuted for the senior Slovenia national team in a friendly 6–0 win over Gibraltar on 4 June 2021.

== Personal life ==
He is the son of the former Slovenian international Amir Karić. His sister Tija is also a footballer.

== Career statistics ==
=== Club ===
As of 17 May 2026

Club	Season	League			National cup (Note: Includes Slovenian Cup, Russian Cup)		Continental		Other		Total	
Club	Season	Division	Apps	Goals	Apps	Goals	Apps	Goals	Apps	Goals	Apps	Goals
Braintree Town (loan)	2018–19	National League	6	0	—		—		—		6	0
Domžale	2019–20	Slovenian PrvaLiga	23	2	1	0	3 (Note: Appearances in UEFA Europa League)	1	—		27	3
Domžale	2020–21	Slovenian PrvaLiga	30	3	3	1	—		—		33	4
Domžale	2021–22	Slovenian PrvaLiga	33	1	2	0	6 (Note: Appearances in UEFA Conference League)	0	—		41	1
Domžale	Total		86	6	6	1	9	1	0	0	101	8
Maribor	2022–23	Slovenian PrvaLiga	28	1	4	0	5 (Note: One appearance in UEFA Champions League, two appearances in UEFA Europa League, two appearances in UEFA Conference League)	0	—		37	1
Maribor	2023–24	Slovenian PrvaLiga	31	3	2	0	3	0	—		36	3
Maribor	2024–25	Slovenian PrvaLiga	5	0	—		6 (Note: Two appearances in UEFA Europa League, four appearances in UEFA Conference League)	0	—		11	0
Maribor	Total		64	4	6	0	14	0	0	0	84	4
Nizhny Novgorod	2024–25	Russian Premier League	21	1	2	1	—		2 (Note: Appearances in relegation play-offs)	0	25	2
Nizhny Novgorod	2025–26	Russian Premier League	29	1	4	0	—		—		33	1
Nizhny Novgorod	Total		50	2	6	1	0	0	2	0	58	3
Career total			206	12	18	2	23	1	2	0	249	15

=== International ===
As of match played 10 June 2025

Appearances and goals by national team and year
National team	Year	Apps	Goals
Slovenia	2021	1	0
Slovenia	2025	1	0
Total		2	0
