= Federico Rose =

Canadian soccer player (born 2004)

Personal information
- Full name: Federico Fitz Anthony Rose
- Date of birth: August 7, 2004 (age 22)
- Place of birth: Toronto, Ontario, Canada
- Height: 1.87 m (6 ft 2 in)
- Position: Forward

Team information
- Current team: Olimpija Ljubljana
- Number: 9

Youth career
- 2018–2022: Woodbridge Strikers
- 2022–2024: Vélez Sarsfield
- 2024: Pafos

Senior career*
Years	Team	Apps	(Gls)
2024–2026	Tabor Sežana	39	(12)
2026	→ Mura (loan)	6	(3)
2026–	Olimpija Ljubljana	0	(0)
- * Club domestic league appearances and goals as of 16:55, 14 April 2026 (UTC) ‡ National team caps and goals as of 16:55, 14 April 2026 (UTC)

Federico Fitz Anthony Rose (born August 7, 2004) is a Canadian professional soccer player who plays as a forward for Slovenian PrvaLiga club Olimpija Ljubljana.

== Club career ==
Rose is a youth product of the Canadian club Woodbridge Strikers and Argentine club Vélez Sarsfield, and moved to the youth side of the Cypriot club Pafos in 2024 to finish his development. On 6 Augus 2024, he joined the Slovenian Second League club Tabor Sežana. On 12 February 2026, he joined Slovenian PrvaLiga club Mura on loan for the second half of the 2025–26 season.

In 2026, Rose joined Slovenian PrvaLiga club Olimpija Ljubljana on a contract until 2029.

== Personal life ==
Born in Canada, Rose was born to a Jamaican father and an Argentine mother. He has Croatian roots through a maternal grandparent, and also holds Croatian citizenship.
