= Luka Krajnc =

Slovenian footballer (born 1994)

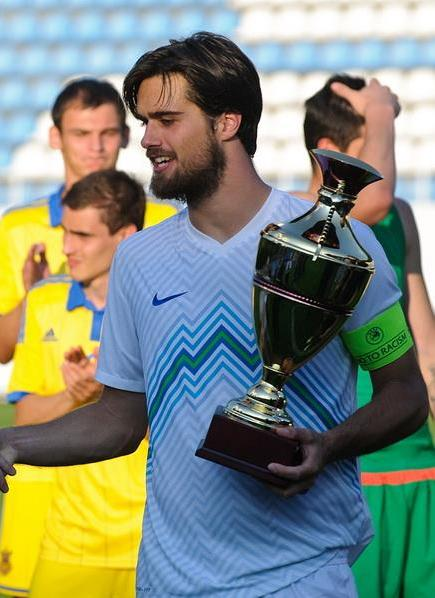
- Krajnc in 2015

Personal information
- Date of birth: 19 September 1994 (age 32)
- Place of birth: Ptuj, Slovenia
- Height: 1.88 m (6 ft 2 in)
- Position: Defender

Youth career
- 2003–2011: Maribor
- 2011–2013: Genoa

Senior career*
Years	Team	Apps	(Gls)
2010–2011	Maribor	1	(0)
2011–2015	Genoa	3	(0)
2013–2015	→ Cesena (loan)	44	(1)
2015–2018	Cagliari	21	(0)
2016–2017	→ Sampdoria (loan)	0	(0)
2017–2018	→ Frosinone (loan)	46	(0)
2018–2021	Frosinone	24	(0)
2020–2021	→ Fortuna Düsseldorf (loan)	24	(2)
2021–2023	Hannover 96	40	(1)
2023–2024	Catanzaro	16	(0)
2024–2026	Maribor	38	(1)

International career
2010	Slovenia U16	1	(0)
2010	Slovenia U17	5	(0)
2011	Slovenia U18	2	(0)
2011–2012	Slovenia U19	16	(1)
2011–2012	Slovenia U20	2	(0)
2012–2016	Slovenia U21	19	(2)
2015–2018	Slovenia	4	(0)
- * Club domestic league appearances and goals as of 2 June 2026

Luka Krajnc (born 19 September 1994) is a Slovenian professional footballer who plays as a defender.

== Club career ==
Krajnc began his football career at the age of eight, when his father took him to the Slovenian club Maribor for a trial. He signed his first professional contract with Maribor at the age of 16 and played for the main squad in a couple of friendly matches. On 29 May 2011, he played his first and only 1. SNL match for Maribor in the last round of the 2010–11 season, with Maribor already being crowned champions. At the time of his debut, he was the youngest player ever with an appearance for Maribor in a 1. SNL match, a record which lasted until 25 March 2012 when it was surpassed by Petar Stojanović.

On 3 April 2011, Krajnc signed a pre-contract with Italian Serie A club Genoa. The transfer fee paid by Genoa was undisclosed, but was reported to be close to €1 million. He joined his new club on 1 July 2011 and was assigned to Genoa's youth team, which he also captained, before making his debut for the first team on 27 October 2012 at San Siro in a league match against AC Milan. With 18 years, one month and 14 days, he became the youngest Slovenian player with an appearance in the Italian top division, Serie A.

On 3 July 2013, he moved to Cesena in a temporary co-ownership deal. In June 2015, Genoa acquired Cesena's share and became the sole owner of the player's rights.

On 31 August 2016, Krajnc joined Sampdoria on a season-long loan. In the second part of the 2016–17 season, he was loaned to Frosinone.

On 20 June 2018, Frosinone turned Krajnc's loan into a permanent deal for an undisclosed fee.

In September 2020, he joined Fortuna Düsseldorf on a season-long loan.

On 24 August 2021, Krajnc joined Hannover 96 on a three-year contract.

On 23 August 2023, Krajnc returned to Italy and signed a two-year deal with Catanzaro.

After 13 years of playing abroad, Krajnc returned to his childhood club Maribor on 7 September 2024 and signed a contract until 2026 with the option for another year.

== International career ==
Krajnc has represented Slovenia at all youth levels from under-16 to under-21. He made his senior international debut on 30 March 2015, replacing Dominic Maroh after 65 minutes in an eventual 1–0 friendly defeat against Qatar at the Jassim bin Hamad Stadium in Doha.

== Personal life ==
Krajnc is from Kapla na Kozjaku in the hilly region of northeastern Slovenia near the Austrian border, approximately 37 km from the city of Maribor. Before moving to Maribor, he usually had to study and do homework in the back seat of his father's car, driving to and from training.

== Career statistics ==
As of match played 25 May 2025

Appearances and goals by club, season and competition
Club	Season	League			National cup (Note: Includes Coppa Italia, DFB-Pokal, Slovenian Cup)		Total	
Club	Season	Division	Apps	Goals	Apps	Goals	Apps	Goals
Maribor	2010–11	1. SNL	1	0	0	0	1	0
Genoa	2011–12	Serie A	0	0	0	0	0	0
Genoa	2012–13	Serie A	3	0	0	0	3	0
Genoa	Total		3	0	0	0	3	0
Cesena (loan)	2013–14	Serie B	22	1	0	0	22	1
Cesena (loan)	2014–15	Serie A	22	0	1	0	23	0
Cesena (loan)	Total		44	1	1	0	45	1
Cagliari	2015–16	Serie B	21	0	3	0	24	0
Cagliari	2016–17	Serie A	0	0	0	0	0	0
Cagliari	Total		21	0	3	0	24	0
Sampdoria (loan)	2016–17	Serie A	0	0	1	0	1	0
Frosinone (loan)	2016–17	Serie B	19	0	0	0	19	0
Frosinone (loan)	2017–18	Serie B	27	0	2	0	29	0
Frosinone (loan)	Total		46	0	2	0	48	0
Frosinone	2018–19	Serie A	9	0	0	0	9	0
Frosinone	2019–20	Serie B	15	0	0	0	15	0
Frosinone	2020–21	Serie B	0	0	0	0	0	0
Frosinone	2021–22	Serie B	0	0	0	0	0	0
Frosinone	Total		24	0	0	0	24	0
Fortuna Düsseldorf (loan)	2020–21	2. Bundesliga	24	2	0	0	24	2
Hannover 96	2021–22	2. Bundesliga	20	0	2	0	22	0
Hannover 96	2022–23	2. Bundesliga	20	1	1	0	21	1
Hannover 96	2023–24	2. Bundesliga	0	0	0	0	0	0
Hannover 96	Total		40	1	3	0	43	1
Catanzaro	2023–24	Serie B	15	0	0	0	15	0
Catanzaro	2024–25	Serie B	1	0	0	0	1	0
Catanzaro	Total		16	0	0	0	16	0
Maribor	2024–25	1. SNL	23	1	2	0	25	1
Career total			242	5	12	0	254	5
