= Benjamin Tetteh =

Ghanaian footballer (born 1997)

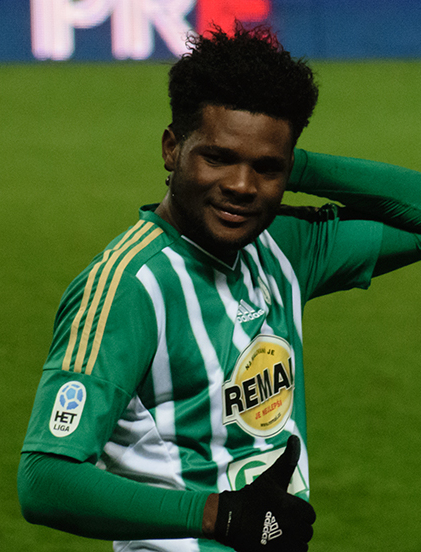
- Tetteh with Bohemians in 2017

Personal information
- Date of birth: 10 July 1997 (age 29)
- Place of birth: Accra, Ghana
- Height: 1.93 m (6 ft 4 in)
- Positions: Striker; attacking midfielder; left winger

Team information
- Current team: Kalba

Youth career
- 2013–2014: Tudu Mighty Jets
- 2014–2015: Dreams

Senior career*
Years	Team	Apps	(Gls)
2015–2018	Standard Liège	16	(2)
2016–2017	→ Slovácko (loan)	13	(1)
2017–2018	→ Bohemians (loan)	20	(2)
2018–2021	Sparta Prague	65	(19)
2020–2021	→ Yeni Malatyaspor (loan)	32	(5)
2021–2022	Yeni Malatyaspor	26	(7)
2022–2023	Hull City	15	(1)
2023–2025	Metz	12	(0)
2024–2025	→ Maribor (loan)	19	(11)
2025–2026	Maribor	29	(12)
2026–	Kalba	0	(0)

International career
2015	Ghana U20	4	(1)
2021–2022	Ghana	7	(0)
- * Club domestic league appearances and goals as of 18:00, 23 May 2026 (UTC)

Benjamin Tetteh (born 10 July 1997) is a Ghanaian professional footballer who plays for UAE Pro League club Kalba. He can play at various attacking positions, including as a striker, attacking midfielder or left winger.

== Club career ==
Tetteh joined Standard Liège in 2015 from Dreams FC, signing a three-year deal. On 17 October 2015, he made his Belgian Pro League debut with Standard Liège against K.V.C. Westerlo.

In July 2018, Tetteh moved to Sparta Prague. He stayed with Sparta for three seasons, before joining Turkish club Yeni Malatyaspor in July 2021.

In July 2022, Tetteh signed for Hull City. He made his debut as a 64th-minute substitute for Óscar Estupiñán on 30 July 2022 in the home match against Bristol City. He won his side's penalty to equalise the score, coming under criticism after the match for the minimal contact that caused him to go down. He scored his first league goal for Hull on 3 March 2023 in a 2–0 home win over West Brom.

On 10 August 2023, Tetteh signed for Metz for an undisclosed fee. In September 2024, he joined Slovenian PrvaLiga club Maribor on a season-long loan.

== International career ==
Tetteh made his debut for the Ghana national team on 9 October 2021 in a World Cup qualifier against Zimbabwe.

On 16 January 2022, Tetteh was sent off in the 94th minute of a 1–1 Africa Cup of Nations group stage draw with Gabon after punching an opposition player in a brawl at full-time. Tetteh was subsequently handed a three-match ban by the CAF.

== Career statistics ==
=== Club ===
As of match played 18 May 2025

Appearances and goals by club, season and competition
Club	Season	League			National cup (Note: Includes Belgian Cup, Czech Cup, Turkish Cup, FA Cup, Coupe de France, Slovenian Cup)		League cup (Note: Includes EFL Cup)		Other		Total	
Club	Season	Division	Apps	Goals	Apps	Goals	Apps	Goals	Apps	Goals	Apps	Goals
Standard Liège	2015–16	Belgian Pro League	15	2	1	0	—		—		16	2
Standard Liège	2016–17	Belgian First Division A	1	0	0	0	—		—		1	0
Standard Liège	Total		16	2	1	0	—		—		17	2
Slovácko (loan)	2016–17	Czech First League	13	1	1	0	—		—		14	1
Bohemians (loan)	2017–18	Czech First League	20	2	1	1	—		—		21	3
Sparta Prague	2018–19	Czech First League	32	11	3	0	—		2 (Note: Appearances in UEFA Europa League)	0	37	11
Sparta Prague	2019–20	Czech First League	33	8	3	1	—		2	0	38	9
Sparta Prague	Total		65	19	6	1	—		4	0	75	20
Yeni Malatyaspor	2020–21	Süper Lig	32	5	1	1	—		—		33	6
Yeni Malatyaspor	2021–22	Süper Lig	26	7	1	1	—		—		27	8
Yeni Malatyaspor	Total		58	12	2	2	—		—		60	14
Hull City	2022–23	EFL Championship	15	1	1	0	1	0	—		17	1
Metz	2023–24	Ligue 1	12	0	1	0	0	0	—		13	0
Maribor (loan)	2024–25	Slovenian PrvaLiga	19	11	2	2	—		—		21	13
Career total			218	48	15	6	1	0	4	0	238	54

=== International ===
Appearances and goals by national team and year
National team	Year	Apps	Goals
Ghana	2021	2	0
Ghana	2022	5	0
Total		7	0

== Honours ==
Standard Liège

- Belgian Cup: 2015–16

Sparta Prague

- Czech Cup: 2019–20
