= Matic Ivanšek =

Slovenian footballer (born 2004)

Personal information
- Full name: Matic Ivanšek
- Date of birth: 26 July 2004 (age 22)
- Place of birth: Slovenia
- Position: Right winger

Team information
- Current team: NK Celje
- Number: 77

Youth career
- NK Triglav Kranj
- NK Olimpija Ljubljana

Senior career*
Years	Team	Apps	(Gls)
2023–2026	NK Bravo	82	(11)
2026–	NK Celje	3	(0)

International career
2022–2023	Slovenia U18	2	(1)
2022–2023	Slovenia U19	5	(0)
2025–	Slovenia U21	2	(0)
- * Club domestic league appearances and goals as of 26 August 2026

Matic Ivanšek (born 26 July 2004) is a Slovenian professional footballer who plays as a right winger for NK Celje and the Slovenia under-21 national team. He previously played for NK Bravo, where he established himself as one of the club's leading young attacking players.

== Early life ==
Ivanšek developed through the youth systems of NK Triglav Kranj and NK Olimpija Ljubljana before beginning his senior career in Slovenian football.

== Club career ==
=== NK Bravo ===
On 13 July 2023, Ivanšek joined NK Bravo. He quickly established himself as a regular first-team player in the Slovenian PrvaLiga.

During the 2023–24 season, he made 24 league appearances and scored two goals. In the following season he became one of Bravo's most productive attacking players, scoring five league goals and providing assists while also featuring in the UEFA Conference League and Slovenian Cup.

Across three seasons with Bravo, Ivanšek made more than 80 league appearances and scored 11 goals.

=== NK Celje ===
On 1 July 2026, Ivanšek joined Slovenian champions NK Celje on a free transfer, signing a contract until June 2029.

Following his arrival, he began featuring for Celje in domestic competition and UEFA Champions League qualifying matches.

== International career ==
Ivanšek has represented Slovenia at under-18, under-19 and under-21 levels. He scored once in two appearances for the Slovenia under-18 national team and later progressed to the under-21 squad.

== Playing style ==
Primarily a right winger, Ivanšek can also operate as an attacking midfielder, left winger, right midfielder, or right-back. He is right-footed and is known for his versatility and attacking contribution from wide areas.

== Career statistics ==
Club	League Apps	League Goals
NK Bravo	82	11
NK Celje	3	0
Total	85	11
