= Redwan Bourlès =

French footballer (born 2003)

Personal information
- Date of birth: 2 January 2003 (age 23)
- Place of birth: Lorient, France
- Height: 1.86 m (6 ft 1 in)
- Positions: Winger; attacking midfielder

Youth career
- 2009–2011: Vigilante de Keryado
- 2011–2014: CEP Lorient
- 2014–2021: Lorient

Senior career*
Years	Team	Apps	(Gls)
2019–2022	Lorient II	34	(7)
2021–2022	Lorient	4	(0)
2022–2023	Rennes II	18	(2)
2024	Maribor	10	(0)
- * Club domestic league appearances and goals as of 6 September 2024

Redwan Bourlès (born 2 January 2003) is a French professional footballer who plays as a midfielder.

== Career ==
Born in Lorient, Bourlès started playing football as early as 2009, with Vigilante de Keryado, an amateur club from his hometown.

He moved to their neighbors of CEP Lorient in 2011, before joining the FC Lorient academy in 2014.

Bourlès made his professional debut for Lorient on 13 August 2021, coming on as a substitute during the 1–0 Ligue 1 home win against Monaco.

On 16 January 2024, Bourlès signed with Slovenian PrvaLiga club Maribor on a contract running until 2026.

== Personal life ==
Bourlès is of Moroccan descent.
