= Jan Repas =

Slovenian footballer (born 1997)

Personal information
- Date of birth: 19 March 1997 (age 29)
- Place of birth: Ljubljana, Slovenia
- Height: 1.71 m (5 ft 7 in)
- Position: Midfielder

Team information
- Current team: AEK Larnaca
- Number: 20

Youth career
- –2016: Domžale

Senior career*
Years	Team	Apps	(Gls)
2015–2017	Domžale	44	(6)
2017–2020	Caen	25	(0)
2018–2020	Caen II	24	(6)
2020–2026	Maribor	188	(24)
2026–	AEK Larnaca	1	(1)

International career
2012–2013	Slovenia U17 (Note: Official UEFA competitive matches only)	4	(1)
2015–2016	Slovenia U19	5	(0)
2017–2018	Slovenia U21	9	(0)
2017–2024	Slovenia	4	(0)
- * Club domestic league appearances and goals as of 30 August 2026

Jan Repas (born 19 March 1997) is a Slovenian professional footballer who plays as a midfielder for Cypriot First Division club AEK Larnaca.

== Club career ==
=== Domžale ===
Repas made his professional debut for Domžale on 28 November 2015 in the Slovenian PrvaLiga match against Koper.

=== Caen ===
In August 2017, Repas signed for Caen for a reported fee of about €1 million.

=== Maribor ===
On 30 June 2020, Repas signed for Slovenian side Maribor until 2023. In August 2022, he renewed his contract with the Violets until 2025.

== International career ==
Repas made three appearances for Slovenia in 2017 during the 2018 World Cup qualification campaign. He also represented Slovenia at youth international level with the under-17, under-19 and under-21 teams.

== Personal life ==
His younger brother, Žiga Repas, is also a professional footballer.

== Career statistics ==
=== Club ===
As of 5 July 2018

Appearances and goals by club, season and competition
Club	season	League			National cup		League cup		Other		Total	
Club	season	Division	Apps	Goals	Apps	Goals	Apps	Goals	Apps	Goals	Apps	Goals
Domžale	2015–16	PrvaLiga	8	1	1	0	—		0	0	9	1
Domžale	2016–17	PrvaLiga	32	4	5	0	—		4 (Note: Appearances in UEFA Europa League)	0	41	4
Domžale	2017–18	PrvaLiga	4	1	0	0	—		7	2	11	3
Domžale	Total		44	6	6	0	0	0	11	2	61	8
Caen	2017–18	Ligue 1	15	0	3	0	1	0	—		19	0
Career total			59	6	9	0	1	0	11	2	80	8

=== International ===
Appearances and goals by national team and year
National team	Year	Apps	Goals
Slovenia	2017	3	0
Slovenia	2024	1	0
Total		4	0
