= Vid Koderman =

Slovenian footballer (born 2003)

Personal information
- Date of birth: 18 April 2003 (age 23)
- Place of birth: Ptuj, Slovenia
- Height: 1.77 m (5 ft 10 in)
- Position: Left-back

Team information
- Current team: Maribor
- Number: 21

Youth career
- Aluminij
- 2017–2021: Maribor

Senior career*
Years	Team	Apps	(Gls)
2021–2023	Maribor	16	(0)
2022	→ Tabor Sežana (loan)	13	(1)
2023	Koper	11	(0)
2023–2024	Celje	1	(0)
2024	Radomlje	7	(0)
2024–2026	Aluminij	63	(6)
2026–	Maribor	6	(0)

International career
2018	Slovenia U16	4	(0)
2021	Slovenia U18	2	(0)
2021–2023	Slovenia U21	10	(0)
- * Club domestic league appearances and goals as of 7 November 2026

Vid Koderman (born 18 April 2003) is a Slovenian footballer who plays as a left-back for Slovenian PrvaLiga club Maribor.
