= Sheyi Ojo =

English footballer (born 1997)

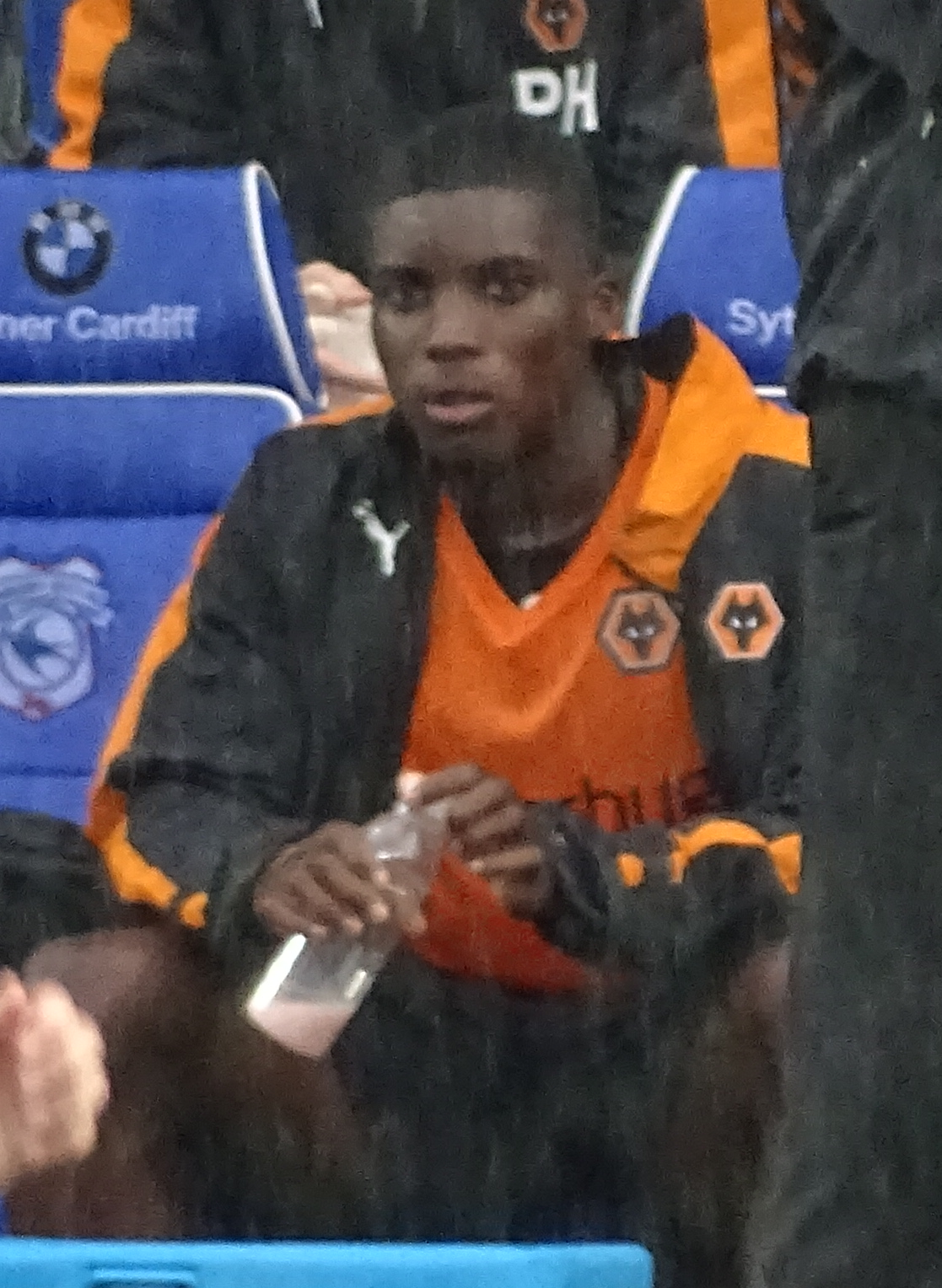
- Ojo with Wolverhampton Wanderers in 2015

Personal information
- Full name: Oluwaseyi Babajide Ojo
- Date of birth: 19 June 1997 (age 29)
- Place of birth: Hemel Hempstead, England
- Height: 1.77 m (5 ft 10 in)
- Positions: Winger; full-back

Team information
- Current team: Aktobe
- Number: 9

Youth career
- 2007–2011: Milton Keynes Dons
- 2011–2015: Liverpool

Senior career*
Years	Team	Apps	(Gls)
2015–2022	Liverpool	8	(0)
2015	→ Wigan Athletic (loan)	11	(0)
2015–2016	→ Wolverhampton Wanderers (loan)	17	(2)
2017–2018	→ Fulham (loan)	22	(4)
2018–2019	→ Reims (loan)	15	(0)
2019–2020	→ Rangers (loan)	19	(1)
2020–2021	→ Cardiff City (loan)	41	(5)
2021–2022	→ Millwall (loan)	18	(0)
2022–2024	Cardiff City	36	(1)
2023–2024	→ Kortrijk (loan)	29	(1)
2024–2026	Maribor	57	(4)
2026–	Aktobe	10	(3)

International career
2011–2012	England U16	3	(0)
2012–2014	England U17	11	(1)
2014–2015	England U18	8	(3)
2015–2016	England U19	14	(1)
2017	England U20	5	(0)
2017	England U21	1	(0)
- * Club domestic league appearances and goals as of 1 November 2026

Oluwaseyi Babajide "Sheyi" Ojo (born 19 June 1997) is an English professional footballer who plays as a full-back or winger for Kazakhstan Premier League club Aktobe.

Ojo joined Liverpool as a 14-year-old and came through their academy. He spent time on loan with Championship clubs Wigan Athletic and Wolverhampton Wanderers before making his competitive debut for Liverpool in January 2016.

Ojo has represented England at under-16, under-17, under-18, under-19, under-20 and under-21 levels.

== Club career ==
=== Early career ===
Ojo joined MK Dons' academy when he was 10 years old. By the age of 13, he had played for the Dons' U18 side and was training with the first team squad. During his time at the club, Ojo became the first MK Dons trainee to receive an international cap at youth level.

=== Liverpool ===
On 11 November 2011, Liverpool beat off competition from a host of Europe's top clubs including a multimillion-pound offer from Chelsea to sign Ojo, then 14, for an undisclosed fee believed to be in the region of £2 million. In April 2014, Ojo was joint top scorer alongside fellow Liverpool player Harry Wilson in the U17 Future Cup.

==== Loan to Wigan ====
Having made a number of appearances on Liverpool's bench over the festive period, Ojo joined Wigan Athletic on loan on 2 February 2015. Five days later, he made his professional debut coming on as a 59th-minute substitute for Wigan in a Championship match against AFC Bournemouth, with Wigan naming Ojo as their Man of the Match after he had a positive impact on the game.

==== Loan to Wolverhampton Wanderers ====
On 2 August 2015, Ojo scored the winning goal for Liverpool in a friendly against Swindon Town. On 4 August 2015, Liverpool announced that Ojo had signed a new long-term contract with the club and confirmed that he would join Wolverhampton Wanderers on a season-long loan. He made his Wolves debut on the opening day of the 2015–16 Championship season as a substitute, coming on in the 84th minute and picking up a yellow card as his side went on to beat Blackburn Rovers. Three days later, he made his first start for Wolves in a 2–1 League Cup win over Newport County, assisting Nouha Dicko for Wolves' opening goal.

==== Return to Liverpool ====
He was recalled by Liverpool on 7 January 2016. The next day, Ojo made his competitive first-team debut for Liverpool, as a substitute in the FA Cup Third round tie against Exeter City that ended in a 2–2 draw. He scored his first competitive goal for Liverpool in the replay against Exeter on 20 January; his goal was the second in a 3–0 victory.

Ojo made his Premier League debut on 20 March 2016, replacing Joe Allen in the 87th minute in a 3–2 loss away to Southampton at St Mary's Stadium. Three weeks later, he made his first start for Liverpool in the Premier League against Stoke City at Anfield, where he assisted Daniel Sturridge for Liverpool's second goal in a 4–1 win, before being replaced by Divock Origi.

Ahead of the 2016–17 season, Ojo sustained a fracture in his back and did not return to first team training until mid-November.

==== Loan to Fulham ====
On 16 August 2017, Ojo joined Fulham on season-long loan. He scored a double in a 5–4 win over Sheffield United, on 21 November. He scored the winning goal in a 1–0 win over Birmingham City, on 9 December. On 23 December, Ojo received a yellow card and scored in a 2–1 win over Barnsley.

==== Loan to Stade de Reims ====
On 30 August 2018, Ojo signed a new contract with Liverpool and joined Stade de Reims on a season-long loan. He also played for Reims II.

==== Loan to Rangers ====
On 18 June 2019, Rangers of the Scottish Premiership announced they signed Ojo on a season-long loan, a day before his 22nd birthday. He made his competitive debut for the club on 9 July 2019 in a 4–0 win over St Joseph's of Gibraltar in the 2019–20 UEFA Europa League, and scored the second goal. He scored four goals for Rangers in Europe.

==== Loan to Cardiff City ====
Ojo joined Championship club Cardiff City on 7 September 2020 for the 2020–21 season. He scored his first goal for Cardiff in a 1–0 win over Preston North End on 18 October.

==== Loan to Millwall ====
On 31 August 2021, Ojo went out on his seventh loan move, this time joining Millwall until 30 June 2022.

In June 2022 it was announced by Liverpool that he would leave the club at the end of the month when his contract expired.

=== Cardiff City ===
On 13 July 2022, Ojo returned to Cardiff City on a permanent basis, signing a two-year contract.

On 16 August 2023, Ojo joined Belgian Pro League club K.V. Kortrijk on a season-long loan.

On 7 June 2024, Cardiff announced he would be leaving in the summer when his contract expired.

=== Maribor ===
On 6 September 2024, Ojo joined the 16-times Slovenian champions Maribor on a two-year deal.

=== Aktobe ===
After two years with Maribor, Ojo moved to Kazakhstan and signed with Kazakhstan Premier League club Aktobe in August 2026.

== International career ==
As Ojo was born in England, he is eligible to represent England, and through his Nigerian heritage is also eligible to play for Nigeria in international football. Ojo has represented England at under-16, under-17, under-18, under-19, under-20 and under-21 levels. In his early teens, Ojo often played at a higher age group at international level, representing England U17s at the St George's Park Tournament in 2012 at the age of 15. Ojo also represented England U17s in the 2014 Algarve Tournament, with England coming second to Germany after a 1–0 loss in the final game.

In September 2014, Ojo received his first under-18 call-up for a double header against the Netherlands. Ojo appeared in both games with England winning by an aggregate score of 7–2. In late August 2015, Ojo received his first call-up to the under-19 team and played the full 90 minutes in a 3–2 friendly away win over Germany on 4 September. At the 2016 UEFA European Under-19 Championship, he started against France and helped The Young Lions secure a 2–1 win by providing two assists.

Ojo was selected for the England under-20 team in the 2017 FIFA U-20 World Cup. He made his tournament debut in the match against Guinea, and was a substitute in a few other games, including the semi-final match against Italy in which he assisted in two of the goals. In the final, Ojo came on as a substitute for Kieran Dowell in the 62nd minute. England beat Venezuela 1–0, which was the country's first win in a global tournament since their World Cup victory of 1966.

In September 2018, he stated he could represent Nigeria at senior level in the future.

== Personal life ==
Born in Hemel Hempstead, England, his name "Babajide" is a variant form of the Yoruba name: Babatunde, meaning "Father has Returned" or "Father Comes Back to Life". During his time with the Liverpool Football Academy, Ojo was a student at Rainhill Media Arts College in Rainhill.

== Career statistics ==
As of 1 July 2024

Appearances and goals by club, season and competition
Club	Season	League			National cup		League cup		Other		Total	
Club	Season	Division	Apps	Goals	Apps	Goals	Apps	Goals	Apps	Goals	Apps	Goals
Liverpool	2014–15	Premier League	0	0	0	0	0	0	0	0	0	0
Liverpool	2015–16	Premier League	8	0	3	1	0	0	0	0	11	1
Liverpool	2016–17	Premier League	0	0	2	0	0	0	—		2	0
Liverpool	Total		8	0	5	1	0	0	0	0	13	1
Wigan Athletic (loan)	2014–15	Championship	11	0	0	0	0	0	—		11	0
Wolverhampton Wanderers (loan)	2015–16	Championship	17	2	0	0	2	1	—		19	3
Fulham (loan)	2017–18	Championship	22	4	1	0	1	0	0	0	24	4
Reims (loan)	2018–19	Ligue 1	15	0	2	1	1	0	—		18	1
Rangers (loan)	2019–20	Scottish Premiership	19	1	2	0	2	0	13 (Note: Appearances in UEFA Europa League)	4	36	5
Cardiff City (loan)	2020–21	Championship	41	5	1	0	0	0	–		42	5
Millwall (loan)	2021–22	Championship	18	0	1	0	0	0	–		19	0
Cardiff City	2022–23	Championship	37	1	2	1	1	0	—		40	2
Cardiff City	2023–24	Championship	0	0	0	0	1	0	—		1	0
Cardiff City	Total		37	1	2	1	2	0	0	0	41	2
Kortrijk (loan)	2023–24	Belgian Pro League	29	1	2	0	—		1 (Note: One appearance in relegation play-offs)	0	32	1
Career total			220	15	16	3	8	1	14	4	258	23

== Honours ==
England U20

- FIFA U-20 World Cup: 2017
