= Žiga Repas =

Slovenian footballer (born 2001)

Personal information
- Date of birth: 29 May 2001 (age 25)
- Place of birth: Ljubljana, Slovenia
- Height: 1.80 m (5 ft 11 in)
- Position: Midfielder

Team information
- Current team: Maribor
- Number: 10

Youth career
- 2008–2020: Domžale

Senior career*
Years	Team	Apps	(Gls)
2019–2024	Domžale	51	(5)
2020–2021	→ Dob (loan)	9	(4)
2024–	Maribor	74	(8)

International career
2017–2018	Slovenia U17	9	(0)
2019	Slovenia U18	3	(0)
2019–2020	Slovenia U19	10	(2)
- * Club domestic league appearances and goals as of 22 November 2026

Žiga Repas (born 29 May 2001) is a Slovenian footballer who plays as a midfielder for Slovenian PrvaLiga club Maribor.

== Personal life ==
His older brother, Jan Repas, is also a professional footballer.
