= Maks Barišič =

Slovenian footballer (born 1995)

Personal information
- Full name: Maks Barišić
- Date of birth: 6 March 1995 (age 31)
- Place of birth: Koper, Slovenia
- Height: 1.87 m (6 ft 2 in)
- Position: Winger

Team information
- Current team: Cjarlins Muzane

Youth career
- –2013: Koper
- 2012–2013: → Catania (loan)
- 2013–2014: Catania
- 2013–2014: → AC Milan (loan)

Senior career*
Years	Team	Apps	(Gls)
2014–2020	Catania	78	(9)
2016	→ Messina (loan)	9	(2)
2017–2018	→ Fidelis Andria (loan)	16	(2)
2019	→ Padova (loan)	0	(0)
2020–2023	Koper	71	(19)
2024–2025	Maribor	19	(3)
2025	Koper	0	(0)
2025	Rodina Moscow	7	(1)
2025–2026	Kras Repen	28	(16)
2026–	Cjarlins Muzane	11	(5)

International career
2011–2012	Slovenia U17		
2012–2013	Slovenia U18		
2013	Slovenia U19		
- * Club domestic league appearances and goals as of 15 November 2026

Maks Barišič (born 6 March 1995) is a Slovenian footballer who plays as a winger for Cjarlins Muzane.

== Club career ==
On 31 January 2019, Barišič joined Padova on loan from Catania with an option to buy. On 24 September 2020, his contract with Catania was terminated by mutual consent. Later that month, he signed a two-year contract with Slovenian PrvaLiga club Koper.

On 14 December 2023, Barišič left Koper and transferred to fellow PrvaLiga club Maribor for an alleged transfer fee of €200,000. He signed a contract until summer 2026 and was given the number 10 shirt.
