= List of NK Maribor seasons =

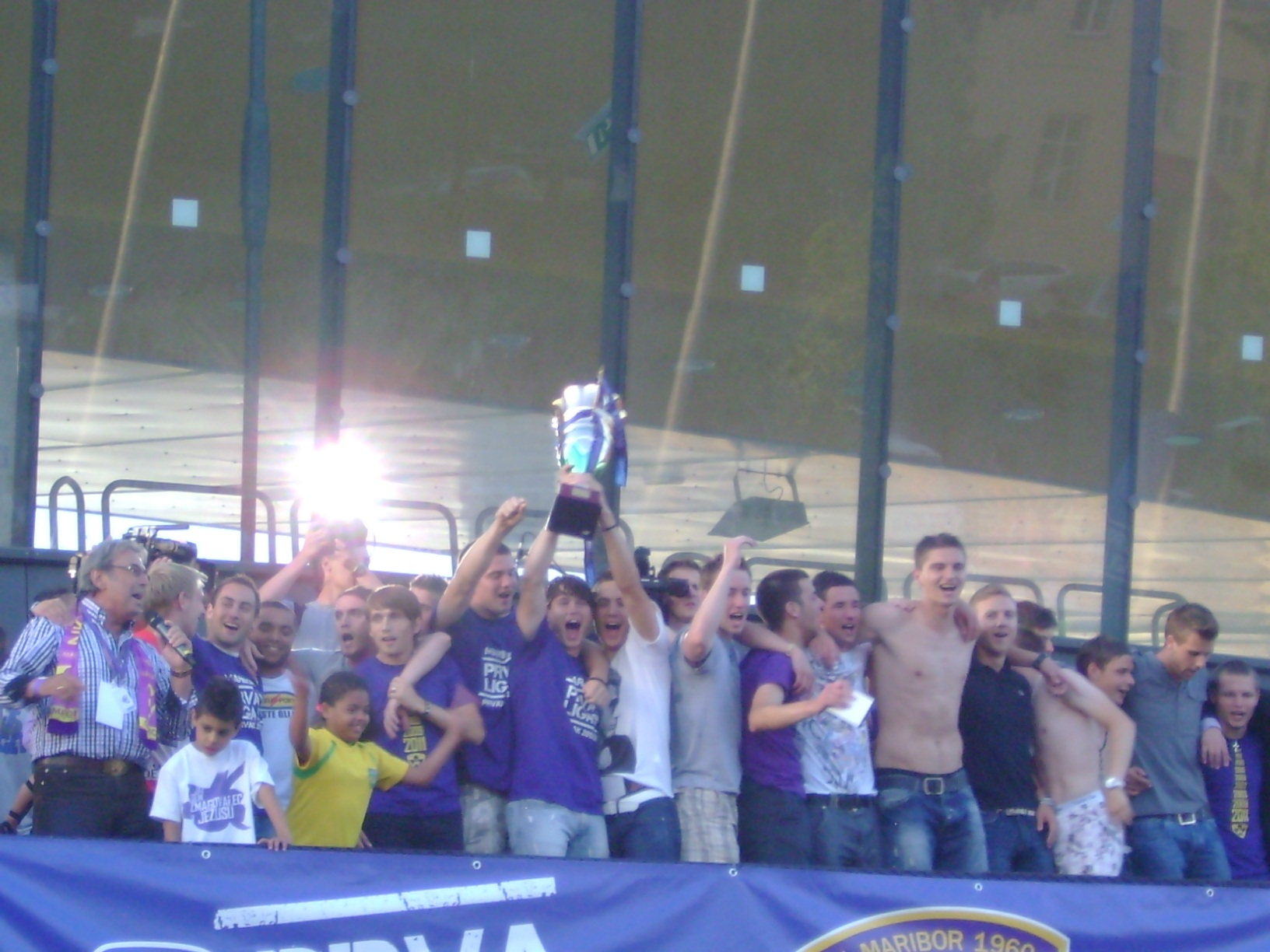
Maribor players celebrating the club's ninth league title

Nogometni klub Maribor is a professional association football club from Maribor, Slovenia. Founded in 1960, the club joined the Football Association of Yugoslavia during the same year and was a member thereof until 1991 and the independence of Slovenia when the club joined the Football Association of Slovenia, where it remains to the present day.

Maribor was founded on 12 December 1960 when it entered the Republic League, the third tier of the Yugoslav football system. During its time in the Yugoslav leagues, Maribor was one of only three Slovenian clubs to participate in the Yugoslav First League, the system's top division. In 31 seasons before the independence of Slovenia in 1991, the club played five seasons in the top Yugoslav division, seventeen in the Second League and nine in the Third League (six seasons as part of the Republic League and three in the Inter-Republic League formed at the end of the 1980s). Apart from winning the Yugoslav second division once and the third division five times, the club had no major success during its Yugoslav period; the closest it came to winning a major trophy was in the 1967–68 season, when it reached the semi-finals of the Yugoslav Cup.

Ljudski vrt

Since 1991, Maribor has competed in the Slovenian PrvaLiga, the highest level of football in the country. The team was one of the league's founding members and is one of only two clubs that have competed in every season of the Slovenian top division since its establishment. The first major success for the club was during its first season as part of the Slovenian football system when it won the Slovenian Cup, a feat it has repeated eight times to date for a total of nine cup titles. The club has won the league championship 16 times in 35 seasons and is the most successful club in the country. In 2009, the club also won the Slovenian Supercup for the first time, the last domestic trophy missing among the club's honours.

As of the end of the 2025–26 season, the team have spent 40 seasons in the top division, 17 in the second division and 9 in the third. To date, the club has won a total of 29 domestic trophies. The team plays at the Ljudski vrt stadium since 1961 and played there even during the stadium's construction. This list details the club's achievements in senior league and cup competitions, and the top scorers for each season.

== Key ==
League

- P = Matches played
- W = Matches won
- D = Matches drawn
- L = Matches lost
- F = Goals for
- A = Goals against
- Pts = Points won
- Pos = Final position

SFR Yugoslavia (1960–61 to 1990–91)

- Div 1 = Yugoslav First League
- Div 2 = Yugoslav Second League
- Div 3 = Yugoslav Third League^{[A]}
- Cup = Yugoslav Cup

Slovenia (since 1991–92)

- Div 1 = Slovenian PrvaLiga
- Cup = Slovenian Cup
- Supercup = Slovenian Supercup

Cup / Europe

- N/A = Was not held
- QR = Qualifying round
- R1 = First round
- R2 = Second round
- R3 = Third round
- R16 = Round of 16
- R32 = Round of 32
- PR = Playoff round
- G = Group stage
- QF = Quarter-final
- SF = Semi-final
- F = Final/Runners-up
- W = Competition won

Champions †	Runners-up ‡	Promoted ↑	Relegated ↓	Top scorer in top division ♦

== Domestic record ==
Correct as of the end of the 2025–26 season. Top scorer's goal tallies are for league goals only. Due to differences in the competition's structure over time (NK Maribor competed in both the Yugoslav Cup and the Slovenian Cup), performances cannot be easily compared, and are therefore not available for sorting.

List of year ranges, representing seasons, and displaying the numbers and types of accomplishments of awards by the team and its players during those timeframes
Season	Division	P	W	D	L	F	A	Pts	Pos	Cup	Supercup	Competition	Result	Name	Goals
Season	League									Cup	Supercup	Other		Top scorer	
1960–61	Div 3 ↑	22	16	3	3	60	22	35	1st †	—	N/A	—	—	Štefan Tolič	9
1961–62	Div 2	22	10	4	8	33	33	24	5th	R2	N/A	—	—	Bogdan Pirc	8
1962–63	Div 2	30	12	11	7	51	33	35	3rd	R16	N/A	—	—	Bogdan Pirc	17
1963–64	Div 2	30	17	6	7	57	21	40	2nd ‡	—	N/A	—	—	Bogdan Pirc	14
1964–65	Div 2	30	16	6	8	56	33	38	3rd	—	N/A	—	—	Bogdan Pirc	11
1965–66	Div 2	33	16	9	8	56	30	41	4th	—	N/A	—	—	Tomislav Prosen	15
1966–67	Div 2 ↑	34	23	10	1	68	17	56	1st †	R16	N/A	—	—	Vito Marković; Boris Binkovski	11
1967–68	Div 1	30	8	11	11	38	53	27	12th	SF	N/A	—	—	Mladen Kranjc	11
1968–69	Div 1	34	7	14	13	33	57	28	16th	—	N/A	—	—	Mladen Kranjc	11
1969–70	Div 1	34	13	7	14	40	51	33	10th	—	N/A	—	—	Mladen Kranjc	12
1970–71	Div 1	34	9	11	14	33	48	29	13th	—	N/A	Mitropa Cup	R1	Mladen Kranjc	7
1971–72	Div 1 ↓	34	3	14	17	24	61	20	18th	—	N/A	—	—	Mladen Kranjc	13
1972–73	Div 2	34	20	10	4	69	23	50	2nd ‡	QF	N/A	—	—	Branko Horjak	22
1973–74	Div 2	34	12	8	14	46	42	32	13th	R16	N/A	—	—	Slobodan Vučeković	13
1974–75	Div 2 ↓	34	9	15	10	37	46	33	15th	N/A^{[B]}	N/A	—	—	Branko Horjak	17
1975–76	Div 3 ↑	26	23	1	2	86	21	47	1st †	—	N/A	—	—	Slobodan Miljković; Bojan Krempl	16
1976–77	Div 2	34	14	7	13	44	49	35	8th	—	N/A	—	—	Branko Horjak	17
1977–78	Div 2	34	13	12	9	47	39	38	4th	R32	N/A	—	—	Branko Horjak	9
1978–79	Div 2	30	12	10	8	46	34	34	2nd ‡	—	N/A	—	—	Savo Zolotić	8
1979–80	Div 2	30	13	5	12	47	38	31	5th	QF	N/A	—	—	Josip Turčik	19
1980–81	Div 2 ↓^{[C]}	30	14	8	8	50	48	36	10th	—	N/A	—	—	Josip Turčik	19
1981–82	Div 3 ↑	26	18	6	2	52	13	42	1st †	R16	N/A	—	—	Bojan Krempl	10
1982–83	Div 2 ↓	34	7	12	15	24	40	26	17th	—	N/A	—	—	Jože Prelogar; Milan Žurman	6
1983–84	Div 3 ↑	26	22	1	3	74	11	35	1st †	R32	N/A	—	—	Matjaž Kek	20
1984–85	Div 2 ↓	34	11	6	17	39	47	28	16th	—	N/A	—	—	Matjaž Kek	10
1985–86	Div 3 ↑	26	17	6	3	66	18	40	1st †	R16	N/A	—	—	Jože Prelogar	30
1986–87	Div 2 ↓	34	11	6	17	36	59	28	16th	R16	N/A	—	—	Milan Žurman	15
1987–88	Div 3	26	16	6	4	40	17	38	2nd ‡	—	N/A	—	—	Metod Verle	9
1988–89	Div 3	34	12	9	13	30	32	30	10th	R32	N/A	—	—	Milan Žurman	6
1989–90	Div 3	34	12	7	15	38	36	29	11th	R32	N/A	—	—	Igor Poznič	11
1990–91	Div 3	34	14	5	15	34	37	31	8th	—	N/A	—	—	Igor Poznič	10
1991–92	Div 1^{[D]}	40	25	9	6	76	29	59	2nd ‡	W †	N/A	—	—	Igor Poznič	27
1992–93	Div 1	34	18	12	4	50	20	48	2nd ‡	R16	N/A	UEFA Cup Winners' Cup	R1	Ante Šimundža; Mirsad Bičakčić	12
1993–94	Div 1	30	16	10	4	55	24	42	3rd	W †	N/A	UEFA Cup	R2	Kliton Bozgo	13
1994–95	Div 1	30	17	8	5	61	23	42	2nd ‡	SF	N/A	UEFA Cup Winners' Cup	R1	Ante Šimundža	9
1995–96	Div 1	36	14	11	11	47	32	53	4th	R16	—	UEFA Cup	R1	Ante Šimundža; Gregor Židan	7
1996–97	Div 1	36	21	8	7	71	34	71	1st †	W †	—	UEFA Intertoto Cup	G	Oskar Drobne	14
1997–98	Div 1	36	24	4	8	69	34	76	1st †	QF	N/A	UEFA Champions League UEFA Cup	QR R1	Marko Kmetec	10
1998–99	Div 1	33	19	9	5	72	29	66	1st †	W †	N/A	UEFA Champions League UEFA Cup	QR R1	Kliton Bozgo	15
1999–2000	Div 1	33	25	6	2	90	30	81	1st †	SF	N/A	UEFA Champions League	G^{[E]}	Kliton Bozgo	24 ♦
2000–01	Div 1	33	18	8	7	61	36	62	1st †	QF	N/A	UEFA Champions League	QR	Andrej Kvas	9
2001–02	Div 1	33	19	9	5	64	23	66	1st †	SF	N/A	UEFA Champions League	QR	Samir Duro	15
2002–03	Div 1	31	18	8	5	56	31	62	1st †	QF	N/A	UEFA Champions League	QR	Ermin Rakovič	13
2003–04	Div 1	32	15	9	8	51	34	54	3rd	W †	N/A	UEFA Champions League	QR	Damir Pekič	12
2004–05	Div 1	32	15	6	11	47	36	51	7th	SF	N/A	UEFA Cup	R1	Kliton Bozgo	18 ♦
2005–06	Div 1	36	16	6	14	51	42	54	4th	SF	N/A	—	—	Martin Pregelj	8
2006–07	Div 1	36	15	12	9	64	50	57	3rd	F ‡	N/A	UEFA Intertoto Cup UEFA Cup	R3^{[F]} QR	Dimitar Makriev	13
2007–08	Div 1	36	14	10	12	55	46	52	4th	F ‡	—	UEFA Intertoto Cup	R2	Dimitar Makriev	10
2008–09	Div 1	36	17	12	7	62	44	63	1st †	SF	—	—	—	Marcos Tavares	15
2009–10	Div 1	36	18	8	10	58	44	63	2nd ‡	W †	W †	UEFA Champions League UEFA Europa League	QR PR	Dragan Jelić	15
2010–11	Div 1	36	21	12	3	65	25	75	1st †	F ‡	F ‡	UEFA Europa League	PR	Marcos Tavares	16 ♦
2011–12	Div 1	36	26	7	3	88	35	85	1st †	W †	F ‡	UEFA Champions League UEFA Europa League	QR G^{[G]}	Dalibor Volaš	17
2012–13	Div 1	36	24	6	6	80	35	78	1st †	W †	W †	UEFA Champions League UEFA Europa League	PR G	Marcos Tavares	17 ♦
2013–14	Div 1	36	24	5	7	78	31	77	1st †	F ‡	W †	UEFA Champions League UEFA Europa League	PR R32	Nusmir Fajić	16
2014–15	Div 1	36	24	7	5	74	32	79	1st †	SF	W †	UEFA Champions League	G	Marcos Tavares	17 ♦
2015–16	Div 1	36	19	11	6	78	37	68	2nd ‡	W †	F	UEFA Champions League	QR	Jean-Philippe Mendy	17 ♦
2016–17	Div 1	36	21	10	5	63	30	73	1st †	SF	N/A	UEFA Europa League	PR	Luka Zahović	15
2017–18	Div 1	36	24	8	4	76	28	80	2nd ‡	QF	N/A	UEFA Champions League	G	Luka Zahović	18 ♦
2018–19	Div 1	36	23	9	4	82	34	78	1st †	F ‡	N/A	UEFA Europa League	QR	Luka Zahović	18 ♦
2019–20	Div 1	36	20	7	9	66	39	67	2nd ‡	R16	N/A	UEFA Champions League UEFA Europa League	QR PR	Rok Kronaveter	14
2020–21	Div 1	36	17	12	7	64	41	63	2nd ‡	QF	N/A	UEFA Europa League	QR	Jan Mlakar	14 ♦
2021–22	Div 1	36	21	7	8	57	37	70	1st †	QF	N/A	UEFA Europa Conference League	QR	Ognjen Mudrinski	17 ♦
2022–23	Div 1	36	18	8	10	70	43	62	3rd	F ‡	N/A	UEFA Champions League UEFA Europa League UEFA Europa Conference League	QR QR PR	Žan Vipotnik	20 ♦
2023–24	Div 1	36	19	10	7	67	35	67	2nd ‡	R16	N/A	UEFA Europa Conference League	QR	Arnel Jakupović	17
2024–25	Div 1	36	19	10	7	64	32	67	2nd ‡	QF	N/A	UEFA Conference League	PR	Benjamin Tetteh	11
2025–26	Div 1	34	15	8	11	57	43	53	5th	R32	N/A	UEFA Conference League	QR	Benjamin Tetteh	12 ♦

== Footnotes ==
- ^{A} The Slovenian Republic League, the highest football league in SR Slovenia, was regarded as the third level league within the Yugoslav football system for most of the time. In 1988 Football Association of Yugoslavia reorganized its competitions and replaced the Republic leagues with the newly formed Inter-Republic league which effectively became the third tier of Yugoslav football.
- ^{B} The 1974–75 Yugoslav Cup edition was not held, due to the rescheduling purposes as the Football Association of Yugoslavia had decided to move the date of cup final from 29 November (or Republic Day, the anniversary of the establishment of communist Yugoslavia) to on or around 25 May (or Youth Day, a national holiday which doubled as the official celebration of Josip Broz Tito's birthday). As a direct consequence, the 1975–76 Cup edition was contested for almost two years.
- ^{C} The club was relegated after a verdict by the Disciplinary Committee of the Football Association of Yugoslavia due to the bribery scandal.
- ^{D} After Slovenia's independence in 1991, Maribor joined the Football Association of Slovenia, the governing body of Slovenian football. The team was one of the founding members of the Slovenian PrvaLiga and played there ever since.
- ^{E} As of the 2026–27 season, Maribor is the only Slovenian club to have appeared in the group stage (rebranded as the league phase in 2024) of the UEFA Champions League.
- ^{F} UEFA acknowledges Maribor as one of the winners of the 2006 UEFA Intertoto Cup; however, the trophy itself was awarded to Newcastle United, the team that advanced farthest in UEFA competitions that season.
