= List of NK Maribor players =

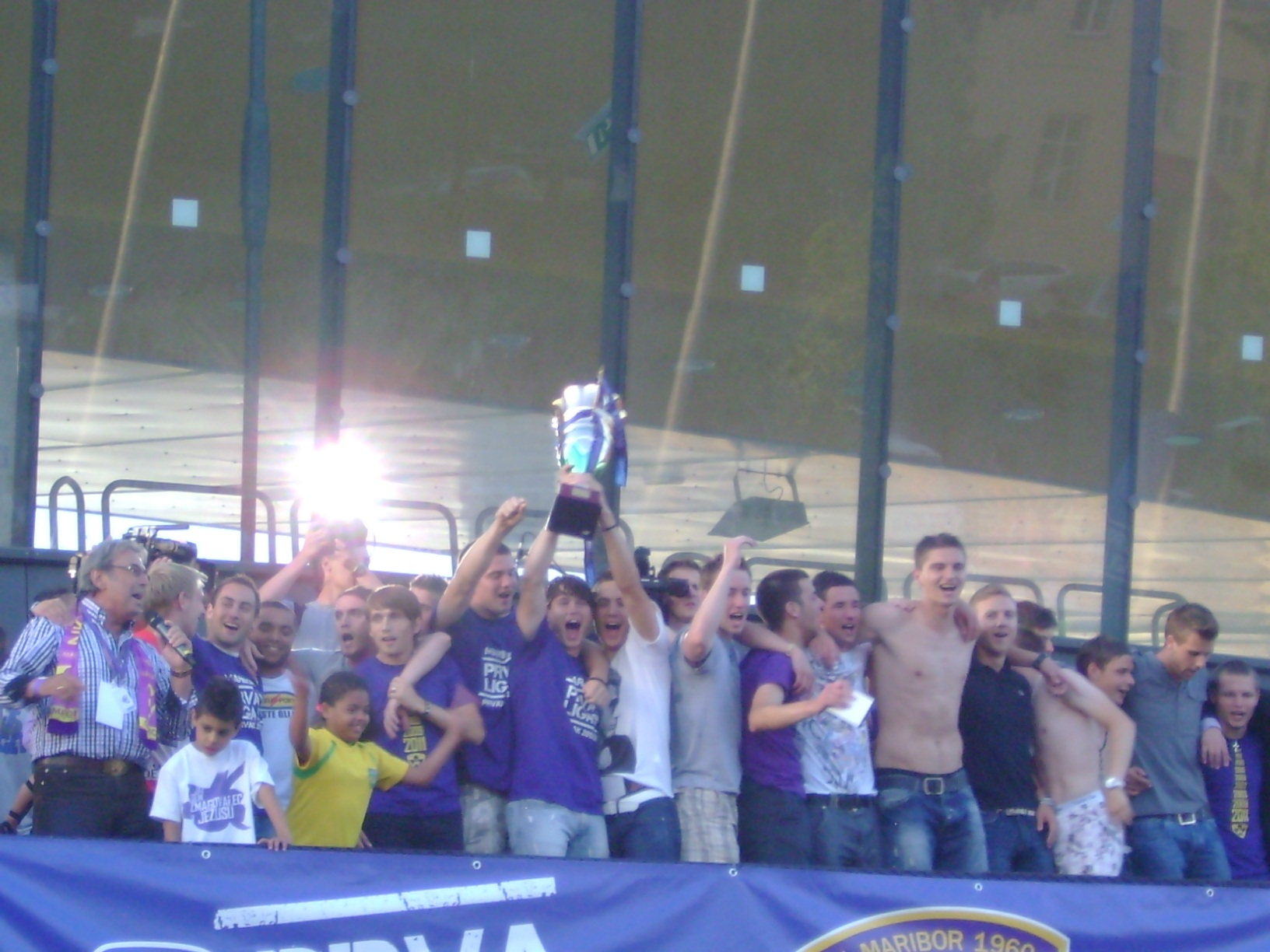
Maribor players celebrating the club's ninth league title in 2011.

Nogometni klub Maribor is an association football club from Maribor, Slovenia. The club was founded in 1960 and joined the Football Association of Yugoslavia the same year. It remained a member until Slovenia gained its independence in 1991, when the club joined the Football Association of Slovenia. Maribor are one of only three Slovenian teams who participated in the Yugoslav highest division, the Yugoslav First League, between the end of the Second World War in 1945 and the breakup of Yugoslavia in 1991. Apart from winning the Yugoslav second division once and the third division five times, they had no success during the Yugoslav period; the closest they came to winning a major trophy was in the 1967–68 season, when they reached the semi-finals of the Yugoslav Cup. Since 1991, Maribor have competed in the Slovenian PrvaLiga, the highest level of football in the country. They were one of the founding members and are one of only two clubs that never dropped out of the league since the inaugural 1991–92 season. Maribor are the most successful club in the country, having won 16 PrvaLiga titles, 9 Slovenian Cups and 4 Slovenian Supercups.

Aside from winning the Slovenian title as Maribor's manager, Matjaž Kek won several championships with the club as a player. Longtime Maribor captain Marcos Tavares joined the club in 2008 and became the all-time record holder for the most appearances and most goals, with 593 appearances and 211 goals until his retirement in 2022. He also holds the club record for most appearances and goals in the Slovenian top division with 436 and 159, respectively. Furthermore, he also holds the club record for most appearances and goals in the Union of European Football Associations (UEFA) competitions, with 94 and 31, respectively.

Since Maribor was founded in 1960, more than 600 players have made a competitive first-team appearance for the club. All players who have featured in 100 or more such matches are listed below. The list also includes all current or former Maribor players who have been capped for their respective national teams.

== Key ==
Key
§	The player has been capped at full international level while a member of the club
†	The player has been capped at full international level
#	Club record
—N/a	The player is still a member of the club

== Players ==
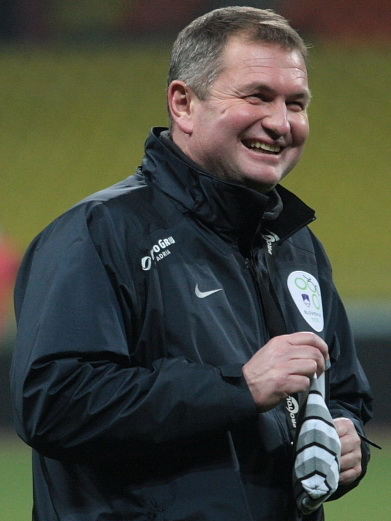
Matjaž Kek won the Slovenian PrvaLiga title with Maribor both as player and manager.

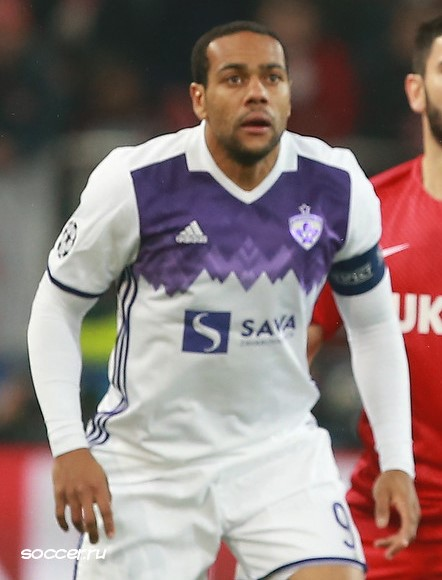
Marcos Tavares has made the most appearances and scored the most goals for the club.

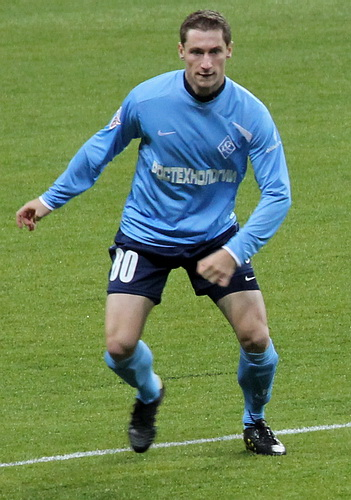
Dragan Jelić made the most appearances for the club between 2001 and 2010.

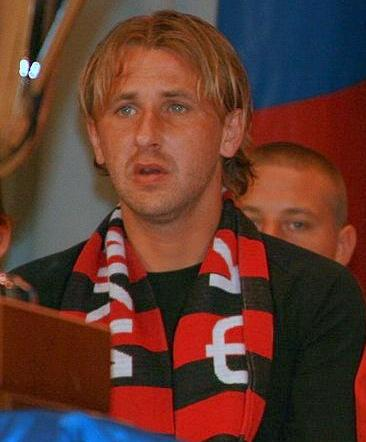
Nastja Čeh has made over 100 appearances for the club in the Slovenian PrvaLiga.

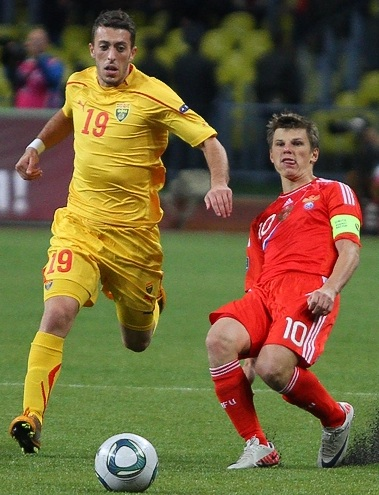
Agim Ibraimi (left) playing for Macedonia in 2011.

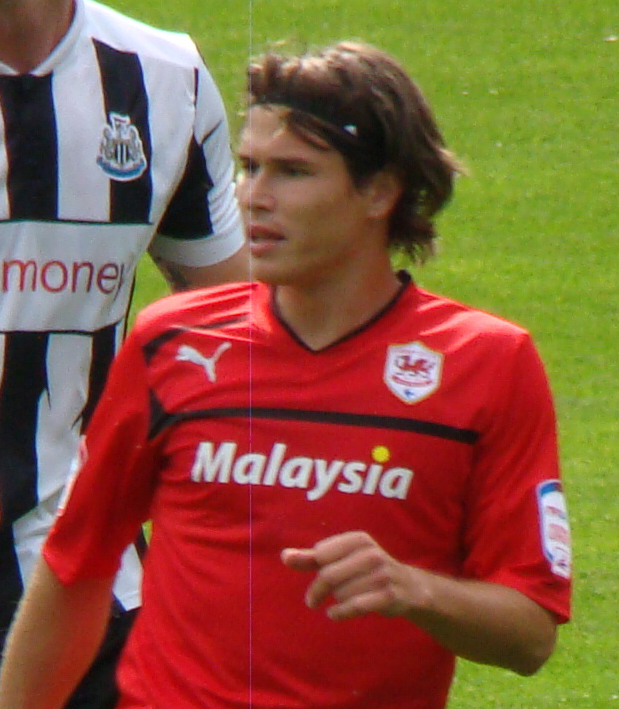
Etien Velikonja spent three seasons in Maribor before moving to Cardiff City in 2012 for the club's record transfer fee at the time.

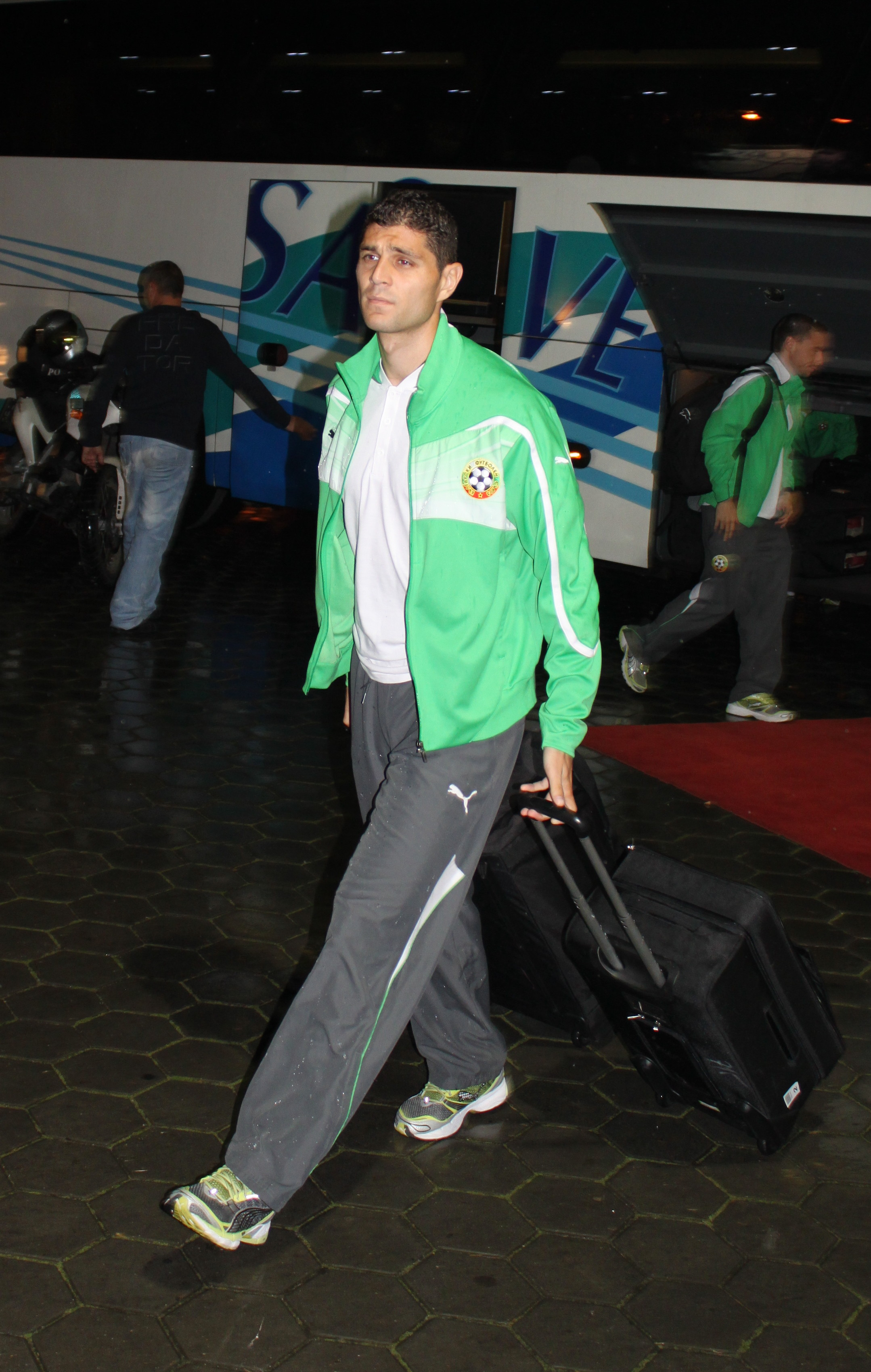
Dimitar Makriev was the club's leading goalscorer in the 2006–07 and 2007–08 seasons.

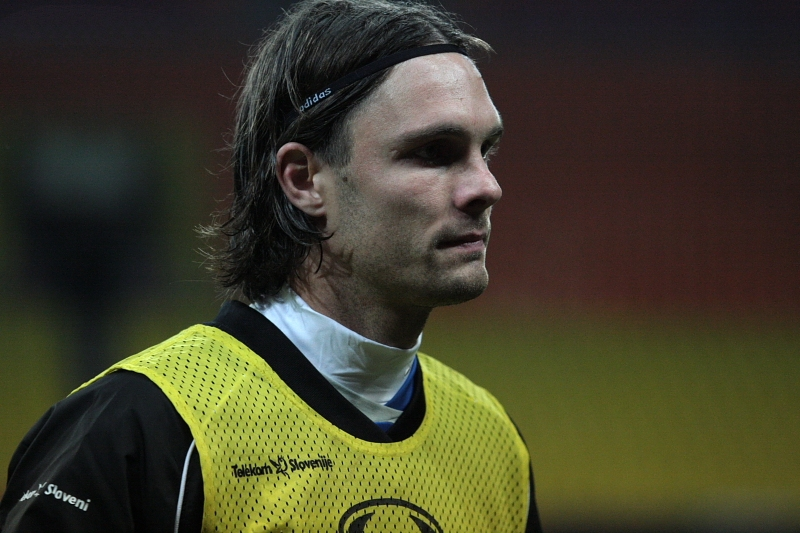
Marko Šuler was an important piece in Matjaž Kek's Slovenia squad at the 2010 FIFA World Cup.

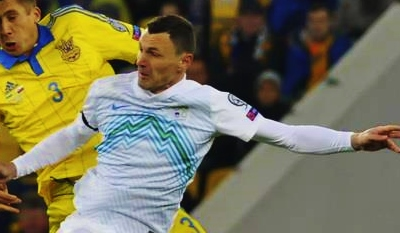
Milivoje Novaković, the second highest goal scorer of the Slovenian national team, played for the club between 2016 and 2017.

The list below includes all NK Maribor players who have made at least 100 official appearances for the club or who have been capped at full international level by their countries. The list is initially ordered by the number of appearances, then by goals scored. If the players are still tied, they are listed alphabetically. The first and last columns contain the year of the player's first and last senior appearance for Maribor. The seasons column counts those seasons in which the player made at least one official appearance. The table that follows is accurate as of the end of the 2025–26 season.

List of Maribor players, and displaying the types of accomplishments and statistics by the players during their time with the club^{[A]}
Name	Country represented	First	Last	Seasons	Apps	Goals
Marcos Tavares	—	2008	2022	15	593 #	211 #
Tomislav Prosen	—	1962	1979	16 #	391	74
Aleš Križan	Slovenia §	1989	2001	10	365	6
Mitja Viler	Slovenia §	2010	2021	11	358	11
Jasmin Handanović	Slovenia §	2011	2020	9	351	0
Herbert Vabič	—	1961	1975	15	317	0
Mladen Kranjc	—	1963	1977	12	311	104
Martin Milec	Slovenia §	2010	2025	12	311	17
Gregor Židan	Slovenia §	1993	2001	9	308	35
Aleš Mertelj	Slovenia §	2009	2017	8	308	12
Aleksander Rajčević	Slovenia §	2010	2020	10	302	10
Ante Šimundža	Slovenia §	1991	2000	10	296	102
Milan Arnejčič	—	1961	1977	15	283	73
Matjaž Kek	Slovenia †	1980	1999	11	280	60
Milan Žurman	—	1981	1997	9	276	82
Branko Horjak	—	1970	1979	9	268	117
Herbert Klančnik	—	1963	1973	10	266	29
Emil Šterbal	—	1991	1999	8	263	3
Igor Poznič	Slovenia §	1985	1996	10	256	88
Vladimir Bolfek	—	1962	1974	11	254	1
Dejan Mezga	—	2007	2016	9	242	61
Zvonko Breber	—	1972	1980	8	239	37
Peter Binkovski	Slovenia §	1989	1999	8	236	18
Amir Karić	Slovenia §	1993	2003	10	235	36
Blaž Vrhovec	Slovenia §	2016	2025	8	231	9
Stipe Balajić	—	1998	2005	8	230	37
Jan Repas	Slovenia §	2020	2026	6	227	27
Branko Šarenac	—	1975	1989	8	226	14
Bojan Krempl	—	1975	1984	10	224	78
Josip Sizgoreo	—	1963	1970	7	222	11
Dragan Grbavac	—	1970	1978	8	221	11
Sašo Lukič	—	1989	1996	8	218	7
Željko Filipović	Slovenia §	2010	2016	6	215	5
Aleks Pihler	Slovenia §	2016	2024	8	209	14
Ažbe Jug	—	2020	—N/a	6	209	0
Kajo Grubišič	—	1963	1972	7	204	2
Suad Fileković	Slovenia §	1999	2010	8	201	6
Dragan Jelić	—	2003	2011	9	200	51
Goran Cvijanović	Slovenia §	2010	2014	4	200	35
Luka Zahović	Slovenia §	2013	—N/a	9	198	81
Aleš Mejač	Slovenia §	2008	2015	8	198	4
Damjan Bohar	Slovenia §	2013	2018	5	195	27
Dare Vršič	Slovenia †	2014	2019	6	193	30
Vojislav Simeunović	—	1965	1972	8	188	0
Boris Binkovski	—	1965	1973	7	182	30
Marko Simeunovič	Slovenia §	1984	2002	8	182	0
Renato Kotnik	—	1990	1995	6	181	27
Rene Mihelič	Slovenia §	2005	2020	7	181	25
Kliton Bozgo	Albania §	1993	2005	5	179	110
Damir Pekič	—	1997	2007	10	178	78
Marinko Šarkezi	—	1997	2004	7	177	13
Dejan Djuranovič	Slovenia †	1994	2003	7	175	26
Marko Šuler	Slovenia †	2014	2019	6	174	9
Vito Marković	—	1961	1969	9	172	62
Oliver Hafner	—	1984	1989	5	172	36
Miro Petrič	—	1970	1977	8	170	3
Agim Ibraimi	(North Macedonia) Macedonia §	2011	2016	5	168	42
Marko Popović	—	2005	2009	5	168	12
Vlado Fatur	—	1974	1985	10	168	3
Josip Lukačevič	—	1985	1991	7	165	9
Alojz Fricelj	—	1982	1997	6	162	18
Amir Dervišević	Slovenia §	2013	2021	7	161	18
Elvedin Džinić	—	2005	2010	7	161	16
Tomaž Murko	—	1997	2006	9	161	0
Dalibor Volaš	—	2008	2015	7	159	62
Dino Hotić	Bosnia and Herzegovina §	2013	2019	8	159	22
Vlado Potočnik	—	1975	1989	9	159	5
Mladen Dabanovič	Slovenia †	1990	1995	6	157	0
Žikica Vuksanović	—	1997	2007	9	152	6
Marko Pridigar	—	2005	2014	9	149	0
Bojan Škerjanec	—	1982	1989	9	147	4
Muamer Vugdalić	Slovenia §	1998	2002	5	143	9
Bogdan Pirc	—	1961	1969	8	142	70
Jože Karmel	—	1972	1978	6	142	2
Rok Kronaveter	Slovenia †	2019	2023	4	141	33
Nastja Čeh	Slovenia †	1997	2001	5	141	21
Boris Ljubič	—	1982	1989	7	141	19
Marinko Galič	Slovenia §	1994	2001	6	140	22
Esad Pirc	—	1973	1979	6	139	41
Milorad Vuksanovič	—	1978	1982	6	136	4
Jasmin Mešanović	Bosnia and Herzegovina †	2017	2021	4	134	26
Robert Berić	Slovenia §	2010	2013	3	130	37
Rajko Rašević	—	1967	1972	5	128	9
Jean-Philippe Mendy	—	2013	2016	3	125	42
Slobodan Filipović	—	1969	1975	7	124	1
Gregor Bajde	—	2015	2021	6	119	26
Željko Milinovič	Slovenia §	1995	1998	3	118	4
Franc Fridl	—	1991	1998	7	118	3
Miha Golob	—	2001	2005	4	118	3
Fabijan Cipot	Slovenia §	2000	2007	6	116	9
Arghus	—	2011	2015	5	116	8
Boštjan Žnuderl	—	1998	2005	6	116	7
Veroljub Jovanović	—	1961	1965	5	116	1
Žarko Tarana	—	1990	1993	3	115	3
Anton Čeh	—	1961	1965	5	113	16
Milan Đuričić	—	1971	1974	4	112	5
Milan Rakič	Slovenia §	2003	2007	4	111	16
Štefan Tolič	—	1961	1966	6	110	14
Marijan Bakula	—	1990	1993	3	109	18
Martin Pregelj	—	1999	2007	5	109	16
Janko Irgolič	—	1979	1986	7	107	0
Nemanja Mitrović	Slovenia §	2019	2023	5	106	6
Dalibor Teinović	—	2002	2005	3	105	4
Marko Božić	—	2022	2024	3	103	17
Armin Bačinović	Slovenia §	2007	2010	4	103	6
Milan Šober	—	1961	1967	9	101	19
Hillal Soudani	Algeria †	2023	2026	3	98	36
Simon Sešlar	Slovenia §	1999	2001	3	97	11
Danijel Brezič	Slovenia †	2002	2005	3	96	5
Rudi Požeg Vancaš	Slovenia †	2019	2021	3	94	18
Alexandru Crețu	Romania §	2018	2021	4	94	5
Gregor Sikošek	Slovenia §	2021	2025	4	94	4
Marwan Kabha	Israel §	2015	2017	3	92	5
Josip Iličić	Slovenia §	2010	2025	4	89	18
Damjan Ošlaj	Slovenia §	2003	2006	4	86	3
Spasoje Bulajič	Slovenia §	1996	1998	3	85	4
Sven Karič	Slovenia †	2022	2024	3	84	4
Pijus Širvys	Lithuania §	2024	2026	3	82	4
Jan Mlakar	Slovenia §	2018	—N/a	3	79	32
Saša Ivković	United Arab Emirates †	2018	2019	3	76	11
Miral Samardžić	Slovenia †	2007	2010	4	72	1
Samir Duro	Bosnia and Herzegovina §	2001	2002	3	71	28
Matic Črnic	Slovenia †	2009	2014	6	69	7
Blagoja Milevski	(North Macedonia) Macedonia †	1993	1995	2	69	3
Zoran Pavlović	Slovenia †	2008	2009	3	67	11
Etien Velikonja	Slovenia §	2011	2012	3	66	28
Petar Stojanović	Slovenia §	2012	—N/a	5	66	3
Aleš Čeh	Slovenia †	2003	2004	2	63	0
Kenan Pirić	Bosnia and Herzegovina §	2018	2020	2	60	0
Geri Çipi	Albania §	1998	2000	2	59	2
Dimitar Makriev	Bulgaria †	2006	2007	2	58	33
Damjan Gajser	Slovenia §	1997	1999	3	58	16
Slobodan Janković	(Socialist Federal Republic of Yugoslavia) Yugoslavia †	1969	1979	2	57	14
Benjamin Tetteh	Ghana †	2024	2026	2	54	25
Zajko Zeba	Bosnia and Herzegovina §	2005	2006	2	54	13
Vladislav Lungu	Moldova †	2006	2007	2	54	0
Žan Vipotnik	Slovenia §	2021	2023	2	50	23
Felipe Santos	Benin †	2018	2021	3	50	5
Milivoje Novaković	Slovenia §	2016	2017	2	49	19
Dejan Trajkovski	Slovenia †	2011	2014	4	49	0
Ermin Rakovič	Slovenia §	2002	2003	3	48	22
Barnabás Sztipánovics	Hungary †	2000	2002	2	48	22
Omar Rekik	Tunisia §	2025	—N/a	2	47	2
Andrej Pečnik	Slovenia †	2006	2007	2	47	1
Erik Janža	Slovenia †	2015	2016	3	46	0
Siniša Anđelković	Slovenia †	2010	2010	2	45	4
Luka Krajnc	Slovenia †	2011	2026	3	43	1
Nino Žugelj	Slovenia †	2019	2022	3	42	7
Matej Šnofl	Slovenia †	1996	2001	4	42	1
Rajko Rep	Slovenia †	2010	2012	3	37	2
Vladislav Bogićević	(Socialist Federal Republic of Yugoslavia) Yugoslavia †	1969	1970	1	37	0
Antoine Makoumbou	Republic of the Congo §	2021	2022	2	37	0
Danijel Šturm	Slovenia †	2021	2022	2	35	2
Valon Ahmedi	Albania §	2016	2018	4	35	1
Aljoša Matko	Slovenia †	2020	2021	2	34	7
Matej Palčič	Slovenia §	2016	2017	2	34	0
Orphé Mbina	Gabon §	2024	2025	2	33	15
Viktor Paço	Albania §	1997	1997	2	32	15
Ilija Martinović	Montenegro §	2020	2021	2	32	3
Enes Mešanović	Bosnia and Herzegovina †	2003	2004	1	30	6
Milan Janković	(Socialist Federal Republic of Yugoslavia) Yugoslavia †	1979	1980	1	29	8
Janez Aljančič	Slovenia †	2009	2010	1	27	0
Dominik Beršnjak	Slovenia †	2004	2004	2	25	6
Vladimir Kokol	Slovenia †	2000	2001	1	25	1
Milko Djurovski	(Socialist Federal Republic of Yugoslavia) Yugoslavia / (North Macedonia) Macedonia^{[B]} §	1994	1994	2	23	13
Matjaž Cvikl	Slovenia †	1991	1997	2	23	10
Saša Gajser	Slovenia †	1992	1993	3	22	1
Jean-Claude Billong	Cameroon †	2017	2017	1	20	1
Xhuliano Skuka	Albania †	2023	2023	1	19	3
Mehmet Dragusha	Albania †	1998	1999	2	18	2
Rocky Siberie	Netherlands Antilles / Curaçao^{[C]} †	2005	2005	1	17	7
Đorđe Ivanović	Serbia †	2022	2022	1	16	4
Kai Meriluoto	Finland †	2025	2025	1	15	4
Jean Michaël Seri	Ivory Coast §	2025	—N/a	1	15	0
Dragan Čadikovski	(North Macedonia) Macedonia †	2007	2007	1	14	4
Érico Castro	Angola †	2023	2023	1	14	2
Marko Janković	Montenegro §	2015	2016	1	14	0
Abel Gigli	Somalia †	2015	2015	1	13	0
Ishaq Rafiu	Nigeria †	2022	2023	2	11	1
Zdravko Šaraba	Bosnia and Herzegovina †	2008	2008	1	10	0
Amar Rahmanović	Bosnia and Herzegovina †	2016	2016	2	9	0
Faruk Ihtijarević	Bosnia and Herzegovina †	2001	2001	2	8	0
Amir Ružnić	Slovenia †	1995	1995	1	5	0
Dalibor Šilić	Bosnia and Herzegovina †	2001	2001	1	3	0
Žan Celar	Slovenia †	2016	2016	1	1	0
Téva Gardies	Madagascar †	2026	—N/a	1	1	0
Žan Karničnik	Slovenia §	2017	—N/a	1	1	0

== Footnotes ==
- ^{A} Statistics include appearances and goals from competitive matches only, not unofficial matches such as exhibition games. During its Yugoslav period (1960–1991) Maribor competed in the Yugoslav First, Second and Third Leagues, the Slovenian Republic League, the Yugoslav Cup and the Slovenian Republic Football Cup. Since Slovenia's independence in 1991, the club has competed domestically in the Slovenian PrvaLiga, Slovenian Cup and Slovenian Supercup, and at European level in the UEFA Champions League, UEFA Cup/UEFA Europa League, UEFA Conference League, UEFA Cup Winners' Cup and UEFA Intertoto Cup.
- ^{B} Milko Djurovski represented Macedonia at full international level while a Maribor player during the 1993–94 and 1994–95 seasons. In the 1980s he represented Yugoslavia.
- ^{C} In 2005, during his brief stay at the club, Rocky Siberie was eligible to play for the Netherlands Antilles, an autonomous Caribbean country within the Kingdom of the Netherlands, and has made appearances for their national team between 2004 and 2008. Since the dissolution of the country in 2010, he has represented Curaçao.
