= History of NK Maribor =

History of Nogometni klub Maribor

Nogometni klub Maribor is a Slovenian professional association football club based in Maribor. It was founded in December 1960 by officials and players of NK Branik Maribor. With 16 Slovenian PrvaLiga titles and 9 Slovenian Cups, they are the most successful Slovenian team. Maribor is also the only Slovenian club that reached the group stages of the UEFA Champions League.

In its early years, the club played in the Yugoslav Second League, before being promoted to the Yugoslav First League in 1967. They remained in the top division for five seasons, then dropped out and never returned to the Yugoslav top flight. In the early 1980s, the club was relegated to the third level due to a bribery scandal.

Following Slovenia's independence in 1991, Maribor were one of the founding members of the Slovenian PrvaLiga, and also won the inaugural edition of the Slovenian Cup in 1992. The first golden era of the club was between 1997 and 2003, when Maribor won seven consecutive league titles and reached the group stages of the 1999–2000 UEFA Champions League. In the mid-2000s, the club declined for several years and was plagued by major financial difficulties.

The second golden era of the club began in 2007, when Zlatko Zahovič was appointed sports director of the club. In the period between 2009 and 2019, Maribor won eight league titles, four cup titles, and qualified for the Champions League group stages twice.

== Background ==
The first step in the establishment of NK Maribor was the creation of the I. SSK Maribor on 28 June 1919. In 1920, the club acquired their first pitch at the Ljudski vrt area and played its first official competitive match against Rapid.

During the interwar period, the Slovenian football scene was dominated by clubs located in Ljubljana and therefore Maribor managed to win the Ljubljana Subassociation League title only three times (1931, 1933 and 1939). After World War II, FD Maribor stepped in as the successor of the I. SSK Maribor. In 1949, NK Branik Maribor was founded. The team was disbanded in August 1960 due to the food poisoning affair before the match against Karlovac in the promotion play-offs for the Yugoslav Second League.

== Formation and early years (1960–1967) ==
Maribor's first kit

Nogometni klub Maribor was founded on 12 December 1960 by officials and players of NK Branik Maribor, a club that folded a few months earlier. The board of the newly established club then organized the presidential elections. Srečko Koren was appointed as the first club president, Andrija Pflander as the first head coach, and Oto Blaznik as the first team captain. It was initially proposed that the club should be named NK Maribor 1960 and that the colours of the club should be red and white, inspired by the colours of the coat of arms of the city of Maribor. However, at the first general assembly on 26 December 1960, it was decided that the club would be called NK Maribor, with purple and white as its main colours. Blaznik was the one who proposed the combination of purple and white jerseys to the club board after seeing photos of Italian side Fiorentina in La Gazzetta dello Sport. Maribor played its first match on 5 February 1961, a friendly against Kovinar, defeating them 2–1 with two goals by Stefan Tolič.

Maribor started competing during the second part of the 1960–61 Slovenian Republic League, and took over the points and position of the city rivals ŽŠD Maribor. The first official league match was played on 12 March 1961, when Maribor played against Nova Gorica and won 2–0. The team won the Republic League (third tier in Yugoslavia) in its first season, and thus qualified for the play-offs to advance to the Yugoslav second division. Pflander was the head coach of the team that won the Republic title, however, he had to step down from the position due to illness. His successor became Vladimir Šimunić, who eventually led the team to the Yugoslav First League six years later. Maribor went through as a winner in the first two rounds of the qualifications and eventually defeated Uljanik from Pula in the final phase with 2–1 on aggregate, therefore earning promotion to the second Yugoslav division.

On 2 September 1962, football fans across Slovenia witnessed the birth of a new rivalry between Maribor and Olimpija. The first match between the two sides was played in Ljubljana and ended in a draw (1–1). After five seasons in the second tier, the club, managed by Šimunić, won the second division and qualified for the Yugoslav First League, making it one of only three Slovenian clubs in history to play in the Yugoslav top flight.

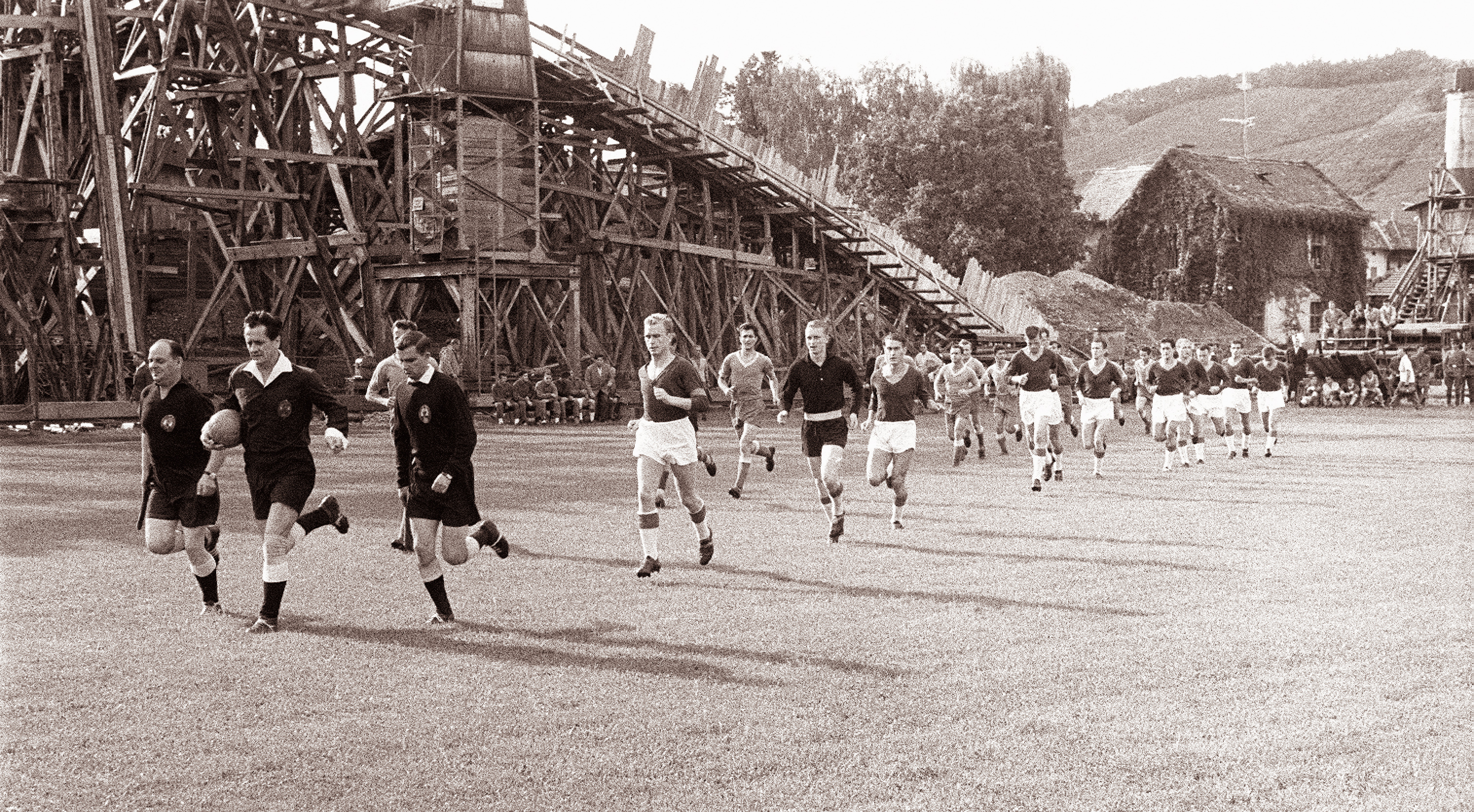
Maribor and Uljanik players before the promotion play-offs in 1961.

== Yugoslav First League (1967–1972) ==
The club's first match in the Yugoslav top division was played on 20 August 1967 against Vardar in Skopje, which ended in a 1–1 draw with Maras scoring the only goal for Maribor. The first home match was played on 27 August against Proleter Zrenjanin in front of 8,000 spectators, which Maribor won 3–0. The goals were scored by Mladen Kranjc, Milan Arnejčič and Boris Binkovski. During the same season, the first match in Yugoslav top division between two Slovenian clubs was contested, when Maribor hosted a match against their rivals Olimpija in front of 13,000 spectators, which ended in a goalless draw. Maribor finished its first top division season in 12th place. In 1966 and 1967, the team also won back-to-back Slovenian Republic Cup titles, beating Olimpija on both occasions. Furthermore, Maribor reached the semi-finals of the Yugoslav Cup in 1968, narrowly losing 2–1 to Crvena zvezda.

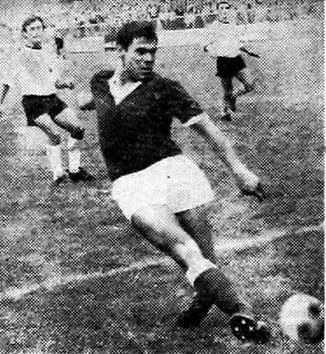
Mladen Kranjc playing for Maribor in 1969.

During their five-year stint in the Yugoslav top division, Maribor played a total of 166 matches and achieved 40 wins, 57 draws and 69 defeats, with a goal difference of 166–270. Their highest league position was in 1969–70, when the club finished in 10th place in a league with 18 teams. 1971–72 was their last season in the Yugoslav first division as the team finished in last place with just 20 points. Maribor never returned to the Yugoslav top division again.

In the first division, Maribor played a total of ten matches against Olimpija, with an overall score of two wins, three draws and five defeats. All matches between the two clubs during this time were sold out, with crowd attendance sometimes reaching up to 20,000. Mladen Kranjc, one of the best players in the history of the club, was the best goalscorer for the team in each of its five seasons spent in the Yugoslav top league, having scored 54 goals, which brought him a transfer from Maribor to Dinamo Zagreb.

== The dark years (1973–1990) ==
In 1972–73, Maribor played in the second Yugoslav division. In the last round, they defeated Rijeka 7–1 at home in front of 7,000 spectators, which was enough for second place and a place in the promotion play-offs. In the first qualifying round against Budućnost, Maribor advanced on penalties and qualified for the decisive round against Proleter. The first leg was played in Maribor on 8 July 1973, and is considered one of the most historic matches in the history of the club, as it still holds the record for the most spectators in the home game. There were 20,000 spectators, and almost three hours before the start of the match, about 15,000 people already gathered in the stands. Maribor won the match 3–1. Two goals advantage was, however, not enough as Proleter won the second leg 3–0 at home and earned the promotion to the top flight, eliminating Maribor 4–3 on aggregate. When the score was 1–0 for Proleter, Josip Ražić scored an equalising goal in the 23rd minute, but the goal was not awarded by the main referee. Later, the television review showed that the ball had actually crossed the line and that the goal should have counted.

After the dramatic play-offs against Proleter, a period of stagnation began for the club. Maribor finished the 1973–74 season in 13th place, and barely avoided relegation to the third tier. However, they were relegated the next season (1974–75), which meant that the team was not part of the top two divisions of Yugoslav football for the first time in 14 years. Maribor immediately returned to the second division after only one season and was again close to promotion to the top tier in 1978–79 when they finished as runners-up, six points behind Čelik. At the end of the 1980–81 season, Maribor defeated Čelik 4–2 in the decisive last round and finished in 10th place, and thus avoided relegation, when the bribery scandal, dubbed as the "Ball Affair" (Slovene: Afera Žoga), caused that the club was relegated by the disciplinary committee of the Football Association of Yugoslavia, from second to third division. The club allegedly had a secret fund that was used for bribing the officials and opponents. Some club officials recorded the cost of bribery in their "black book", which was later confiscated by the authorities. The club had to play in the Slovenian Republic League in the next season. During the 1980s, Maribor never fully recovered from the affair and was bouncing between second and third division up until Slovenia's independence in 1991. Between 1981 and 1989, Maribor won six Slovenian Republic Cups.

From 1988 and until Slovenia's independence in 1991, Maribor played in the West Division of the newly established Inter-Republic League (third tier of Yugoslav football) with teams from Slovenia, Croatia and Bosnia and Herzegovina. In 1988, Maribor joined the Branik Sports Association and became Maribor Branik. Although the club uses the name NK Maribor in domestic and international competitions, it is, nevertheless, officially registered under the name of NK Maribor Branik to this day.

== New country and international debut (1991–1996) ==
After Slovenia's independence in 1991, the best clubs in the country formed the Slovenian First League, or simply 1. SNL. Maribor were one of the founding members of the league and is one of only two clubs, the other being Celje, which has never dropped out from the Slovenian top division since then. The team played its first 1. SNL match against Gorica in Nova Gorica, which ended in a 1–1 draw. Later, the match was registered as a 3–0 win for Gorica because Maribor's goalscorer Ante Šimundža was not eligible to play for the team. Maribor had to wait until the second round when they won their first points after they defeated Koper with the score of 5–0. The club's first official scorer in the Slovenian League match was Igor Poznič. During the first couple of seasons, Maribor's rivals Olimpija from Ljubljana, which had a long tradition of playing in the Yugoslav first division and at the time still had their squad composed of players from that era, dominated the league. Despite, Maribor still managed to win the first edition of the Slovenian Football Cup. The final match was played in Ljubljana at the Bežigrad Stadium against Olimpija. The final ended in a goalless draw and was won by Maribor on penalties, with the decisive goal scored by Edim Hadžialagić.

In 1992–93, Maribor debuted in international competitions as the team played in the 1992–93 European Cup Winners' Cup. It was on 19 August 1992, when the team hosted Ħamrun Spartans from Malta and won 4–0. The next season, Maribor again played in the European Cup Winners' Cup and achieved its biggest victory in European competitions to date, when they defeated Estonian side Norma Tallinn 10–0 at home. The match is also historic for being the first match at Ljudski vrt that was played at night under the floodlights.

Maribor were Slovenian League runners-up in 1991–92, 1992–93 and 1994–95, and finished third in 1993–94. During this period the club managed to win another Slovenian Cup, in 1993–94, after defeating Mura in the final over two legs.

== Domination (1996–2003) ==

The lineup that defeated Dynamo Kyiv 1–0 in the UEFA Champions League.

The 1996–97 season was a turning point in the history of Maribor. They won the league and became Slovenian national champions for the first time. During this season, the average home attendance of Maribor's matches was 5,289, which is still a record. The final match of the season was played on 1 June 1997 against Beltinci in front of 14,000 spectators, which is also a joint-record attendance of the 1. SNL. During the course of the same season Maribor also won the Slovenian Cup, thus winning the domestic double.

In 1998–99, Maribor came close to qualifying for the elite UEFA Champions League, but were eliminated in the final qualifying round by PSV Eindhoven, losing 5–3 on aggregate after extra time. However, they managed to qualify for the group stage in the next season. Under the guidance of head coach Bojan Prašnikar, Maribor defeated Genk (5–1, 0–3) and Lyon (1–0, 2–0) in the qualifying rounds. In the group stage, they were drawn against Dynamo Kyiv, Bayer Leverkusen and Lazio. Maribor started their Champions League campaign with a win as the team managed to pull an upset in Kyiv against Dynamo; Šimundža scored late in the game for the final score of 1–0. After that, Maribor did not win any points in the group until the final round when the team played in Leverkusen against Bayer, and managed to hold on to a 0–0 draw, thus preventing the German side from qualifying to the next round.

One of the most famous matches in the history of the Slovenian league was played in the final round of the 2000–01 season, when Olimpija met Maribor at their home stadium in Ljubljana. Both teams were competing for their fifth league title. Olimpija needed a win to secure the title, while a draw was enough for Maribor. The match ended with a draw (1–1), and Maribor won their fifth consecutive title in front of 3,000 Maribor fans that travelled to Ljubljana. Croatian coach Ivo Šušak became the first foreign coach to win the Slovenian league title.

In 2002–03, Celje led the championship standings and Maribor began to face their first financial and results crisis in more than a decade. At one point, the team was twelve points behind the league leaders when the title hunt began with new head coach Matjaž Kek. Maribor caught up with Celje three rounds before the end of the season and played a decisive match against them at home, only one round later. Celje was leading 1–0 until the 86th minute, when Danijel Brezič and Damir Pekič scored two late goals for Maribor and thus secured their seventh consecutive title.

== Financial difficulties (2004–2008) ==
The 2003–04 Slovenian Cup was the last trophy won by Maribor before the club declined. They failed to win their eighth consecutive league title in 2003–04 after losing to Mura in the final round of the season, losing the title to Gorica. The following season, Maribor finished seventh in the league and played in the relegation group, which is still their lowest ever finish in Slovenian football.

Between 2004 and 2008, the club was struggling with financial difficulties and the disbandment of the club was seriously considered at one point. Due to debt, which at one point reached over €3 million, the club could not afford to buy new players. As a consequence, the first team consisted mostly of youth team players together with a couple of foreign players brought to the club as free agents. In the fall of 2006, the club changed leadership, and it was not until January 2011 that the club announced that the debt had been paid in full.

Despite the debt, Maribor managed to defeat Villarreal 3–2 on aggregate, a club that played in the semi-final of the UEFA Champions League only a couple of months earlier, in the third round of the 2006 UEFA Intertoto Cup. UEFA recognizes Maribor as one of the winners of the competition. However, the trophy itself was awarded only to Newcastle United. The next year, Maribor was eliminated from the 2007 UEFA Intertoto Cup by Hajduk Kula. After winning the first match 2–0, Maribor suffered a heavy 5–0 defeat away in Serbia, which is still described today as one of the club's most unexpected defeats.

In this period, Maribor also lost two consecutive Slovenian cup finals (2007 and 2008), and never finished higher than third in the league.

== Beginning of the golden era with Zahovič and Tavares (2008–2013) ==
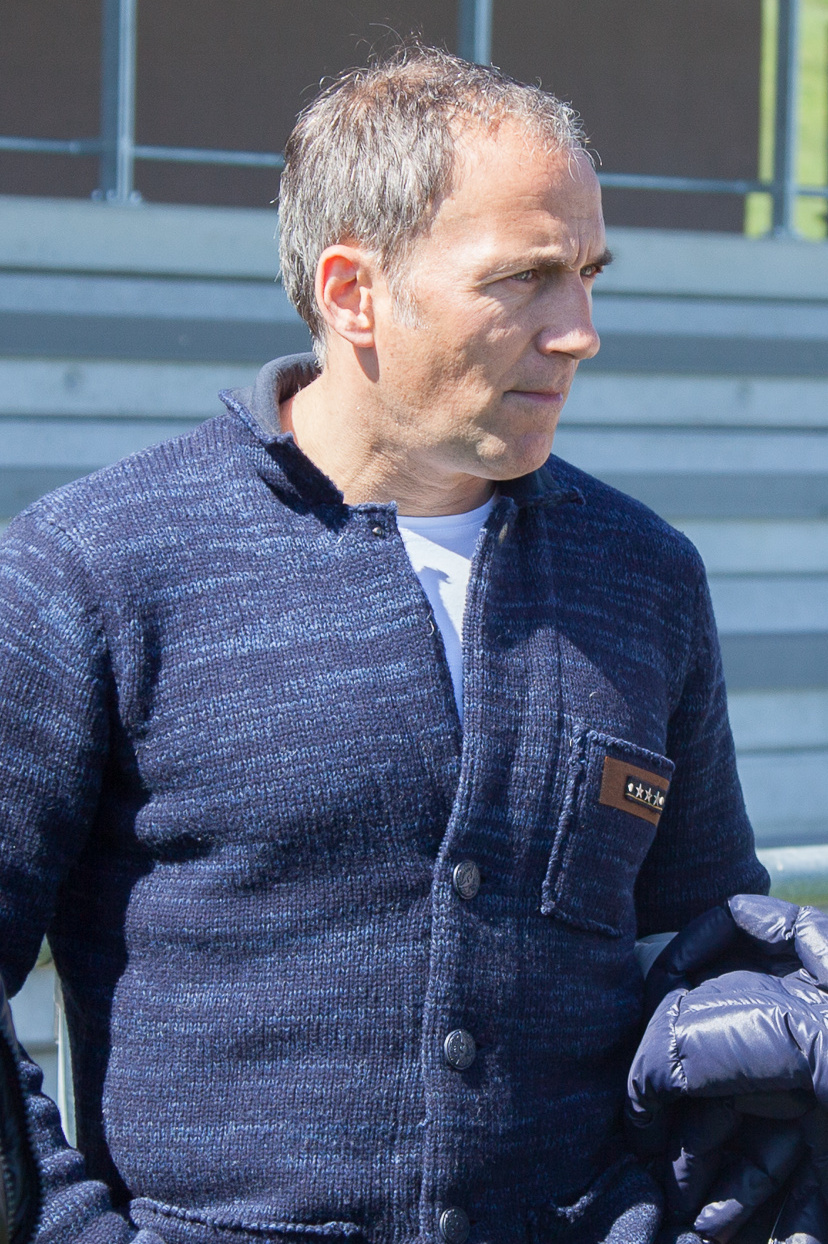
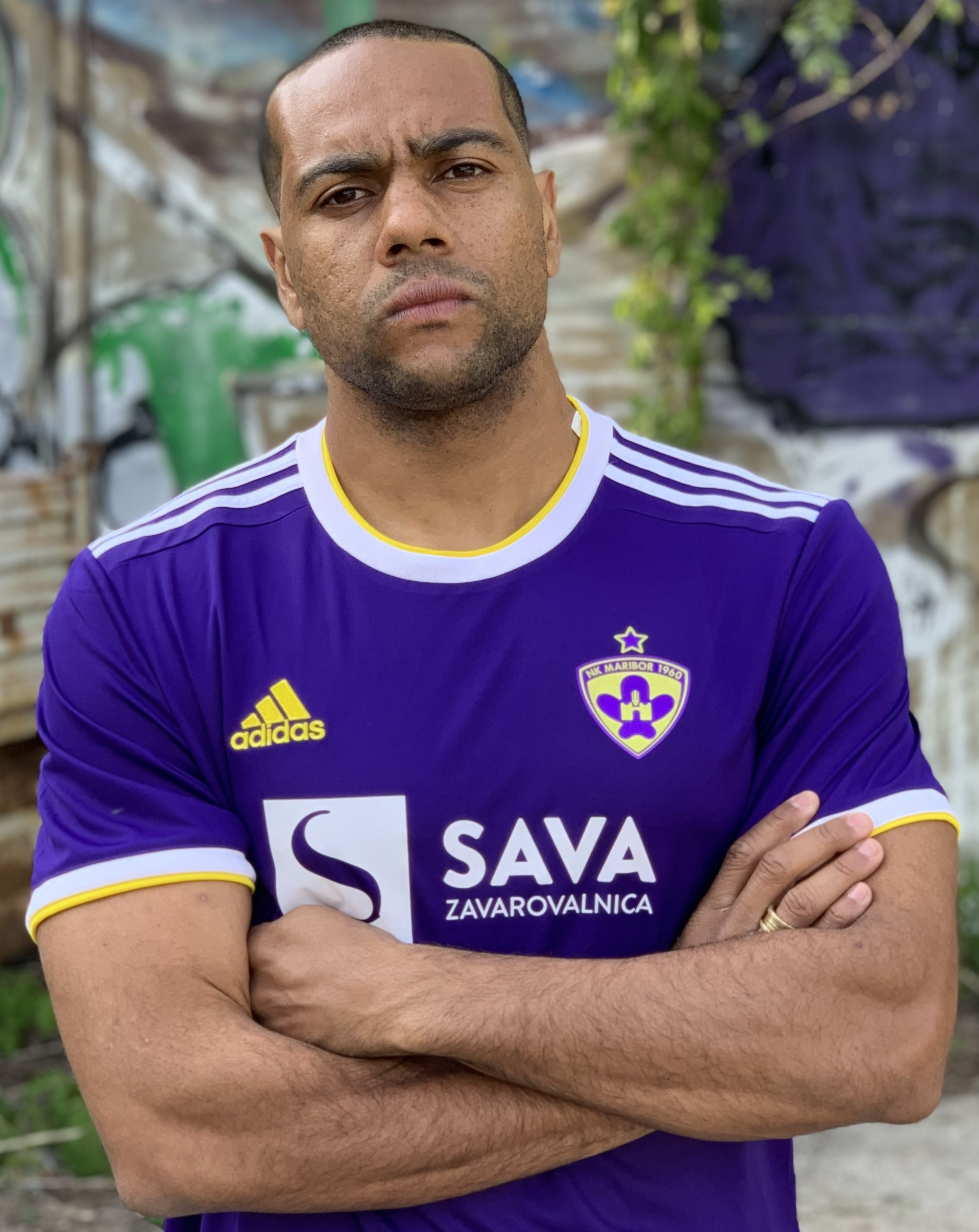
Milanič (left) and Tavares (right), who are considered the best manager and the best player in the history of the club.

Before the 2007–08 season, former Slovenian international Zlatko Zahovič was appointed sports director of Maribor, which marked the beginning of the golden era of the club. In 2008, Darko Milanič and Marcos Tavares were brought to Maribor. The former became the most successful manager in the history of Maribor, and the latter the club's all-time top goalscorer in all competitions.

In May 2008, the club reopened the Ljudski vrt stadium, which underwent a major reconstruction. The first match played at the renovated stadium was a league match against Nafta Lendava, which was won 3–1 in front of 12,435 spectators. In the 2008–09 season, the team reached the semi-finals of the 2008–09 Slovenian Cup, where they were eliminated by Interblock. With a 1–0 home victory in front of 9,000 fans against Celje on 9 May 2009, the club managed to secure its first league title in six years. The scorer of the goal, which brought Maribor the eighth championship title, was Dalibor Volaš.

At the beginning of the 2009–10 season, Maribor won its first Slovenian Supercup title, the only domestic trophy missing among club honours. The club also qualified for the final of the Slovenian Cup, which was hosted on their stadium in May 2010, and won their sixth cup title after extra time, defeating Domžale. David Bunderla scored the decisive goal in the 120th minute of the match. With the latest trophy, Milanič became the first manager to have won all three domestic trophies in Slovenian club football.

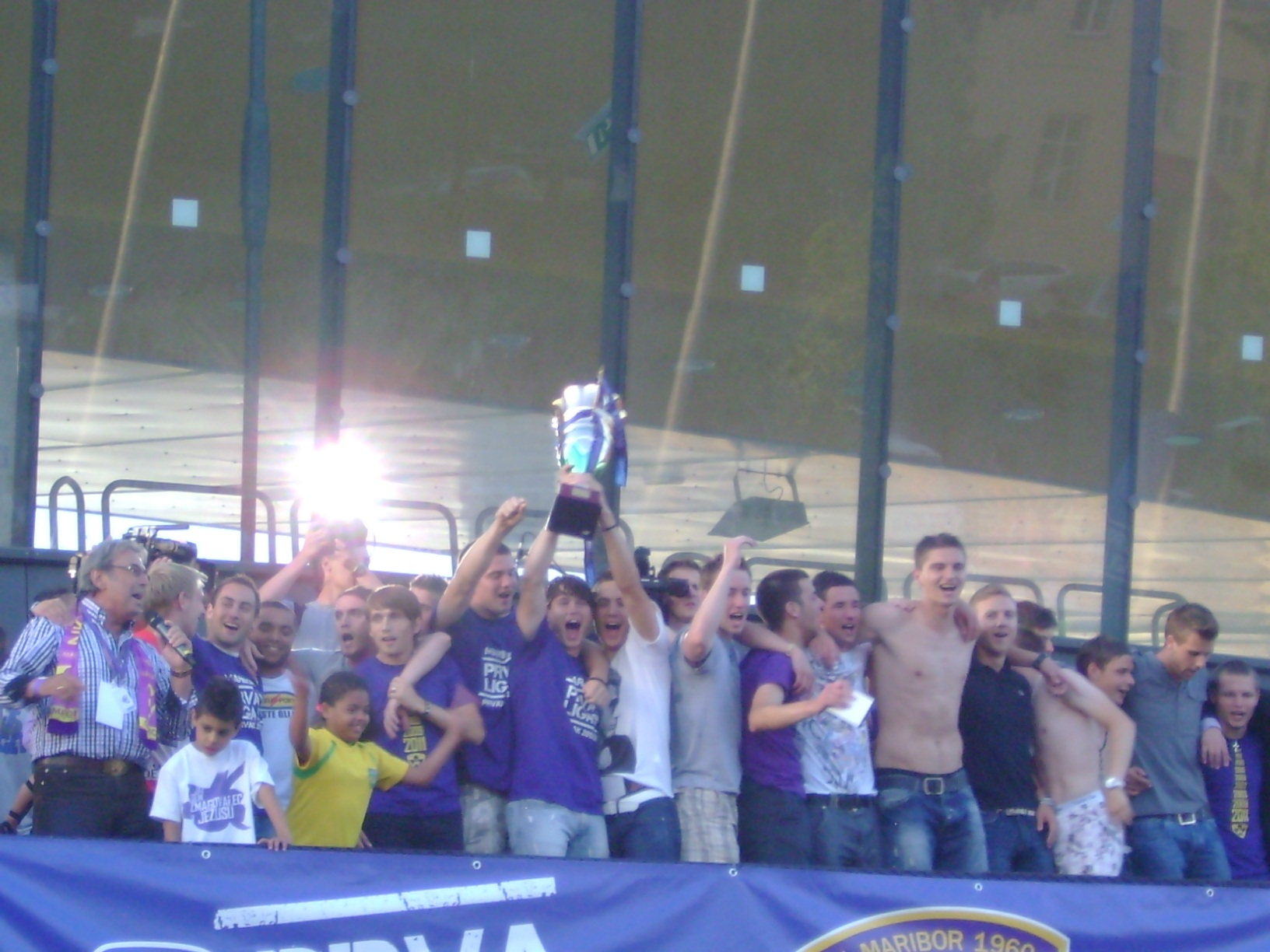
Maribor players celebrating the club's ninth league title in 2011.

Maribor played in another Supercup match at the beginning of the 2010–11 season, but failed to defend the title after losing to Koper on penalties. The team had an impressive run in the 2010–11 UEFA Europa League where it played a total of six matches, defeating Videoton (1–1, 2–0) and Hibernian (3–0, 3–2), before losing in the play-offs against Serie A club Palermo (0–3, 3–2).

After 15 rounds of the 2010–11 Slovenian PrvaLiga season, Maribor set a record for the best start in the history of the Slovenian League. With eleven wins and four draws, the team won an impressive 37 points and improved the club's record of the generation that had played in the UEFA Champions League eleven years earlier. With the 2–1 away victory over Primorje, on 21 May 2011, Maribor secured its ninth Slovenian league title. Four days later, the team played the Slovenian cup final at Stožice Stadium and lost to Domžale, 4–3. Marcos Tavares was crowned as the top league goalscorer of the 2010–11 season, with 16 goals.

At the beginning of the 2011–12 season, Maribor lost their second consecutive Supercup match, to Domžale. In European competitions, Maribor qualified for the group stages for the first time since 1999. After being eliminated from the 2011–12 UEFA Champions League by Maccabi Haifa, Maribor caused one of the biggest upsets in the 2011–12 UEFA Europa League play-offs by eliminating Rangers and thus qualifying for the group stage. Maribor were drawn against the title holders Braga, Club Brugge and Birmingham City. The club lost five out of six matches and scored its only point at home against Braga (1–1), and eventually finished dead last in the group. In this season, Maribor won its tenth league title with a record numbers of points (85) and finished 20 points above second-placed Olimpija. Furthermore, they won the 2012 Slovenian Cup Final by defeating their Styrian rivals Celje on penalties, securing their seventh cup title and the first double since 1998–99. They repeated this feat the following season by winning all three domestic trophies (league, cup and supercup). Maribor also played in the group stages of the 2012–13 UEFA Europa League, where they won four points. In June 2013, Milanič resigned. Under his leadership, Maribor won nine trophies in five seasons.

== Champions League and Zahovič's departure (2013–2020) ==
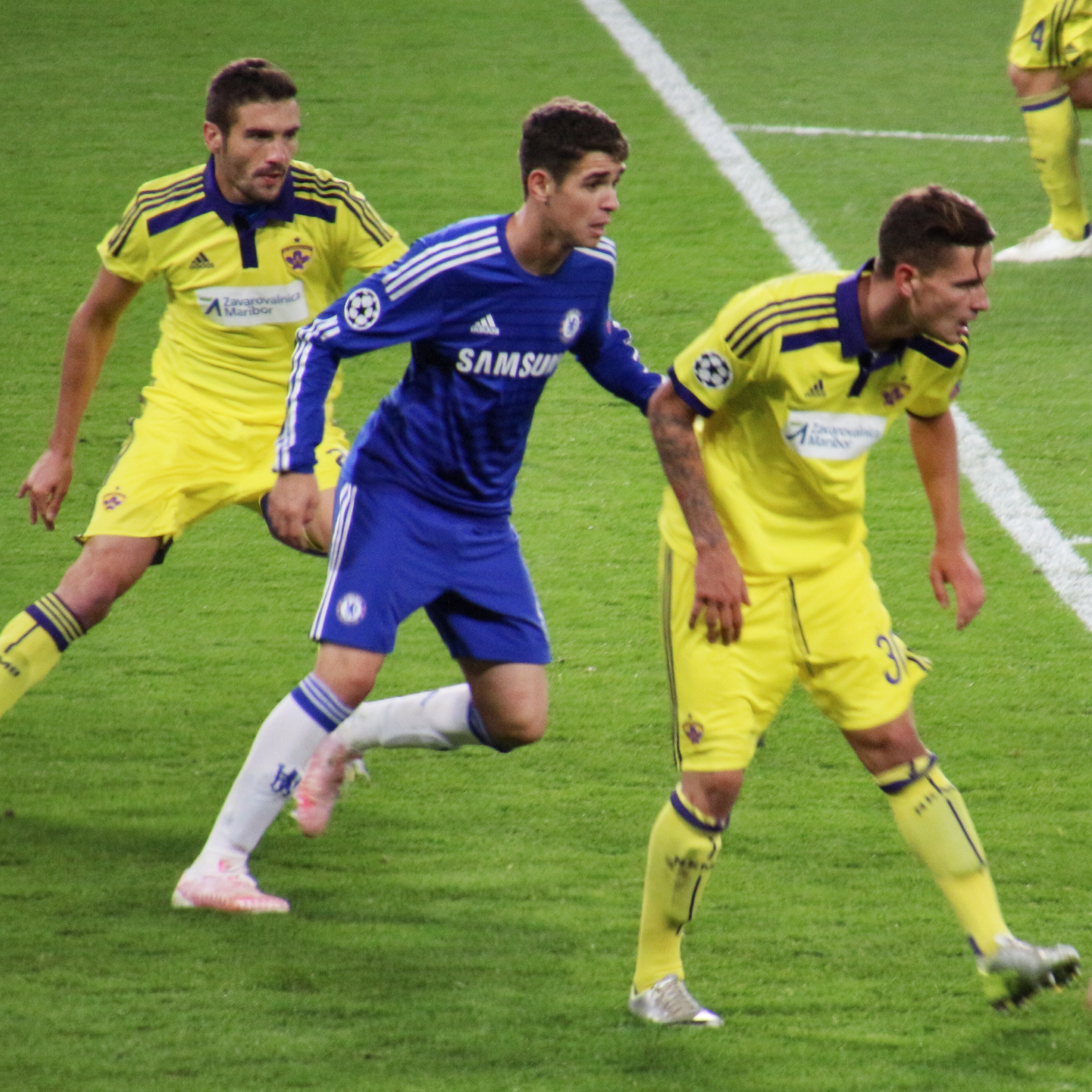
Maribor playing against Chelsea in October 2014.

Under the leadership of the newly appointed manager Ante Čačić, Maribor won another Supercup title in July 2013 after beating Olimpija. Shortly afterwards, Čačić left the club and was replaced by Ante Šimundža. In 2013–14, Maribor qualified for the group stage of the UEFA Europa League for the third consecutive season. This time, they made a breakthrough and advanced to the knockout stages for the first time after finishing second, behind Rubin Kazan and above Zulte Waregem and Wigan Athletic. In the round of 32, they were eliminated by Sevilla with an aggregate score of 4–3. The club confirmed its fourth consecutive league title by defeating Triglav Kranj 2–1 on 13 May 2014. However, they failed to win their third consecutive double as they lost 2–0 in the cup final against Gorica.

In the 2014–15 season, Maribor reached the group stages of the UEFA Champions League for the first time since 1999 after eliminating Zrinjski Mostar, Maccabi Tel Aviv and Celtic in the qualifying rounds. They were drawn in Group G with Chelsea, Schalke 04 and Sporting CP. Maribor managed to score three points in six games after drawing with Sporting CP and Chelsea at home and with Schalke 04 in Gelsenkirchen. All three matches ended 1–1. Other results include a heavy defeat at Stamford Bridge against Chelsea, where Maribor lost 6–0, and defeats against Sporting CP and Schalke 04 (3–1 and 1–0, respectively). During the next season, Maribor sacked two managers, Šimundža and Krunoslav Jurčić, and failed to win the domestic title for the first time since 2009–10 after finishing second behind their rivals Olimpija. They did, however, win their ninth cup title after defeating Celje in the final.

Maribor bounced back and reclaimed the title the following season. As champions, they earned a place in the 2017–18 UEFA Champions League and repeated the feat from 2014, qualifying for the group stages of the competition for the third time in the history of the club. They again won three points in six games, drawing twice with Spartak Moscow and once with Sevilla. Their 7–0 defeat to Liverpool in the third matchday was the club's heaviest home defeat in European competitions, and their second highest European defeat overall. During the same season, Maribor failed to win a trophy for the first time since 2007–08. In the national league, Maribor was already ten points behind Olimpija by mid-March with twelve games remaining, however, the club won the next eight out of nine games and took one point lead over Olimpija before the head-to-head match in the 34th round. In the title deciding match, Olimpija won 3–2 with a goal by Andrés Vombergar in the last minute. Maribor have won two remaining games, but lost the league title to Olimpija on head-to-head record after finishing with the same number of points. Olimpija also eliminated Maribor in the quarter-finals of the national cup with an aggregate score of 4–1, meaning that Maribor failed to reach the semi-finals of the competition for the first time since 2002–03.

In 2018–19, Maribor won its 15th national title under the guidance of Milanič, who won his sixth league title with the club. In 2019–20, Maribor were eliminated in the round of 16 of the 2019–20 Slovenian Cup by the second division side Koper. They were never before eliminated from the cup by a team outside the top division; it was also the first time since 1995–96 that Maribor got eliminated so early in the competition.

In March 2020, Milanič and Zahovič resigned after a series of poor results. During Zahovič's era, Maribor won eight league titles and reached the UEFA Champions League group stages twice.

== Decline and Tavares' departure (2020–present) ==
After the departure of Zahovič and Milanič, a turbulent period began for the club. Zahovič was replaced by Oliver Bogatinov as sports director, who was previously the head of the youth academy. Maribor lost the 2019–20 Slovenian PrvaLiga title to Celje and barely ranked second, with the same number of points as Olimpija. In the 2020–21 UEFA Europa League, the team was eliminated in the first qualifying round by the semi-professional Northern Irish club Coleraine, which was described as one of the most humiliating defeats in the history of the club. In early 2021, Bogatinov left the club due to alleged disputes with former Maribor player Marko Šuler, who became the new sports director. In 2020–21, Maribor once again failed to win the championship after losing the title-deciding home match against Mura in the last round. Maribor needed a draw for the title, but lost 3–1 and Mura won its first title. Within two years after Zahovič's departure, Maribor sacked three managers (Sergej Jakirović, Mauro Camoranesi and Simon Rožman) and went on a record run of nine consecutive winless matches against their biggest rivals Olimpija.

In 2021–22, Maribor won its 16th national title on the final day of the season after beating Mura 3–1, ending a three-year trophyless drought. Ognjen Mudrinski was one of the key members of the team; he was voted as the PrvaLiga player of the year, and also finished as the league's top scorer with 17 goals. After the season, a longtime captain and the club's all-time most capped player and top goalscorer, Marcos Tavares, retired from professional football after spending 15 seasons with Maribor. In his honour, Maribor retired his number 9 jersey, and also renamed the West Stand of Ljudski vrt to Marcos Tavares Stand.

The success from the previous season was short-lived, as the start of the 2022–23 season was the worst for the club since Slovenia's independence in 1991. Maribor were sitting in last place after five rounds with just three points, failed to score in six consecutive European games, lost a record six games in a row, and went on a nine-game winless streak in all competitions, also a record. Although they still managed to finish in third place in the league, it was nonetheless the club's worst season in 15 years, as Maribor had last finished lower than second place in the 2007–08 season. The club managed to reach the cup final, but failed to win the trophy after losing to Olimpija 2–1 after extra time with a last minute penalty kick.
