= 2016–17 NK Maribor season =

NK Maribor
2016–17 season
- President: Drago Cotar
- Head Coach: Darko Milanič
- Stadium: Ljudski vrt
- Slovenian League: Winners
- Slovenian Cup: Semi-finals
- Europa League: Play-off round
- Top goalscorer: League: Luka Zahović (15); All: Luka Zahović (16)
- Highest home attendance: 12,000 vs Olimpija (25 February 2017)
- Lowest home attendance: 1,200 vs Celje (17 May 2017)
- Average home league attendance: 4,222
Home colours	Away colours

The 2016–17 season was Maribor's 57th season of football, and their 26th consecutive season in the Slovenian PrvaLiga, Slovenian top division, since the league establishment in 1991 with Maribor as one of the league's founding members. The team participated in the Slovenian PrvaLiga, Slovenian Football Cup, and UEFA Europa League. The season covers the period from 1 June 2016 to 31 May 2017.

== Slovenian League ==
=== Standings ===
Pos	Team	Pld	W	D	L	GF	GA	GD	Pts	Qualification or relegation
1	Maribor (C)	36	21	10	5	63	30	+33	73	Qualification for the Champions League second qualifying round
2	Gorica	36	16	12	8	48	39	+9	60 (Note: Gorica ahead of Olimpija on head-to-head record: Olimpija–Gorica 1–0, Gorica–Olimpija 1–1, Olimpija–Gorica 1–2, Gorica–Olimpija 1–0)	Qualification for the Europa League first qualifying round (Note: Domžale qualified for Europa League first qualifying round by winning the 2016–17 Slovenian Football Cup.)
3	Olimpija Ljubljana	36	17	9	10	49	35	+14	60	Qualification for the Europa League first qualifying round
4	Domžale	36	16	8	12	63	45	+18	56	Qualification for the Europa League first qualifying round
5	Celje	36	15	10	11	48	39	+9	55	

Source: PrvaLiga (in Slovene), Soccerway
Rules for classification: 1) Points; 2) Head-to-head points; 3) Head-to-head goal difference; 4) Head-to-head away goals scored; 5) Goal difference; 6) Goals scored; 7) Away goals scored; 8) Fairplay ranking; 9) Draw.
(C) Champions

==== Results summary ====
Overall								Home						Away					
Pld	W	D	L	GF	GA	GD	Pts	W	D	L	GF	GA	GD	W	D	L	GF	GA	GD
36	21	10	5	63	30	+33	73	14	2	2	33	9	+24	7	8	3	30	21	+9

Last updated: 27 May 2017.

==== Results by round ====
Round	1	2	3	4	5	6	7	8	9	10	11	12	13	14	15	16	17	18	19	20	21	22	23	24	25	26	27	28	29	30	31	32	33	34	35	36
Ground	H	H	A	H	A	H	A	H	A	A	A	H	A	H	A	H	A	H	H	H	A	H	A	H	A	H	A	A	A	H	A	H	A	H	A	H
Result	W	W	D	D	L	L	W	W	W	W	D	W	W	W	D	W	W	W	W	W	L	W	W	W	D	W	D	D	W	W	D	D	L	L	D	W
Position	3	1	2	3	4	5	4	4	2	2	2	2	2	1	2	2	1	1	1	1	1	1	1	1	1	1	1	1	1	1	1	1	1	1	1	1

Updated to match(es) played on 27 May 2017. Source: PrvaLiga website
A = Away; H = Home; W = Win; D = Draw; L = Loss

=== Matches ===
17 July 2016 1	Maribor	1–0	Koper	Maribor
20:15 CEST	Hodžić (yellow card) 57'; Viler (yellow card) 75'; Vršič 90+4' (yellow card) 90+4'	Report	Gregov (yellow card) 44'	Stadium: Ljudski vrt Attendance: 2,000; Referee: Dragoslav Perić

24 July 2016 2	Maribor	2–0	Rudar Velenje	Maribor
20:15 CEST	Omoregie 33'; Vrhovec (yellow card) 72'; Omoregie 89'	Report	Zec (yellow card) 6'; Krcić (yellow card) 32'	Stadium: Ljudski vrt Attendance: 2,500; Referee: Damir Skomina

31 July 2016 3	Domžale	2–2	Maribor	Domžale
20:15 CEST	Juninho 49'; Balkovec 65' (f.k.); Širok (yellow card) 82'	Report	Miha Blažič 28' (o.g.); Bohar 30'; Pihler (yellow card) 38'	Stadium: Sports Park; Attendance: 2,500; Referee: Matej Jug

8 August 2016 4	Maribor	1–1	Olimpija	Maribor
20:15 CEST	Novaković 18'; Vršič (yellow card) 42'; Sallalich (yellow card) 65'	Report	Kronaveter (yellow card) 48'; Zajc 79'	Stadium: Ljudski vrt Attendance: 11,000; Referee: Nejc Kajtazović

13 August 2016 5	Gorica	2–1	Maribor	Nova Gorica
17:55 CEST	Šuler 42' (o.g.); Burgić 67'	Report	Defendi (yellow card) 13'; Bajde 56'; Vrhovec (yellow card) 62'; Janža (yellow card) 83'	Stadium: Sports Park; Attendance: 1,000; Referee: Damir Skomina

21 August 2016 6	Maribor	0–2	Aluminij	Maribor
20:15 CEST	Mertelj (yellow card) 13'; Šuler (yellow card) 64'; Hodžić (yellow card) 70'; Kabha (yellow card) 89'	Report	Škoflek 24'; Petrović (yellow card) 42'; Zeba 72'	Stadium: Ljudski vrt Attendance: 2,000; Referee: Darjan Kovačič

28 August 2016 7	Celje	0–3	Maribor	Celje
20:15 CEST	Pišek (yellow card) 70'	Report	Defendi (yellow card) 44'; Pišek 51' (o.g.); Omoregie 71'; Zahović 86'	Stadium: Arena Petrol; Attendance: 2,800; Referee: Bojan Mertik

10 September 2016 8	Maribor	4–0	Radomlje	Maribor
20:15 CEST	Novaković 40'; Omoregie 45+1', 57'; Šuler 51'	Report	Jugovar (yellow card) 17'; Nunić (red card) 39'	Stadium: Ljudski vrt Attendance: 2,300; Referee: Roman Glažar

17 September 2016 9	Krško	1–2	Maribor	Krško
20:15 CEST	Jurečič (yellow card) 16'; Šturm 36'; Krajcer (yellow card) 56'	Report	Vršič 12'; Vrhovec (yellow card) 36'; Šme (yellow card) 70'; Kabha 90+1'; Šuler (yellow card) 90+4'	Stadium: Matija Gubec; Attendance: 1,700; Referee: Asmir Sagrković

21 September 2016 10	Koper	1–2	Maribor	Koper
20:15 CEST	Datković 30'; Ibričić (yellow card) 47'; Andrejašič (yellow card) 53'; Pučko (yellow card) 64'; Gregov (yellow card) 65'; Pranjić (yellow card) 77'; Muslimović (yellow card) 85'	Report	Pihler (yellow card) 27'; Zahović 45'; Tavares 62'; Janža (yellow card) 66'	Stadium: Bonifika; Attendance: 2,000; Referee: Matej Jug

25 September 2016 11	Rudar Velenje	1–1	Maribor	Velenje
16:55 CEST	Vručina (yellow card) 31' (goal) 65'; Pišek (yellow card) 62'	Report	Novaković 26'; Kabha (yellow card) 21'	Stadium: Ob Jezeru; Attendance: 2,000; Referee: Rade Obrenović

1 October 2016 12	Maribor	3–1	Domžale	Maribor
20:15 CEST	Tavares 51' 56'; Zahović 90+1'	Report	Horvat 8'; Matjašič (yellow card) 21'; Dobrovoljc (yellow card) 33'; Halilović (yellow card) 74'; Širok (red card) 90+6'	Stadium: Ljudski vrt Attendance: 4,000; Referee: Damir Skomina

15 October 2016 13	Olimpija	1–3	Maribor	Ljubljana
20:30 CEST	Krefl (yellow card) 81'; Kronaveter 86'; Velikonja (yellow card) 90'	Report	Kabha (yellow card) 12'; Tavares (yellow card) 12'; Novaković 35' (yellow card) 64'; Pihler 49'; Vršič (yellow card) 63'; Janža (yellow card) 82'; Handanović (yellow card) 90+3'; Zahović 90+4'	Stadium: Stožice; Attendance: 13,770; Referee: Matej Jug

22 October 2016 14	Maribor	1–0	Gorica	Maribor
20:15 CEST	Šuler 47'	Report		Stadium: Ljudski vrt Attendance: 3,500; Referee: Dejan Balažič

30 October 2016 15	Aluminij	0–0	Maribor	Kidričevo
14:00 CET	Vrbanec (yellow card) 38'; Turkalj (yellow card) 44'; Rebernik (yellow card) 74'	Report	Janža (yellow card) 88'	Stadium: Sports Park; Attendance: 1,500; Referee: Roberto Ponis

5 November 2016 16	Maribor	2–0	Celje	Maribor
20:15 CET	Zahović 62' (yellow card) 86'; Novaković 70'	Report	Rahmanović (yellow card) 53'	Stadium: Ljudski vrt Attendance: 2,000; Referee: Matej Jug

20 November 2016 17	Radomlje	0–3	Maribor	Domžale
16:55 CET	Jazbec (yellow card) 35'; Marinšek (yellow card) 90+3'	Report	Šuler 32'; Pihler 37', 88'; Janža (yellow card) 56'; Šme (yellow card) 81'	Stadium: Sports Park; Attendance: 600; Referee: Nejc Kajtazović

26 November 2016 18	Maribor	4–0	Krško	Maribor
20:15 CET	Zahović 8' (yellow card) 65'; Vršič 15'; Tavares 18'; Šme (yellow card) 26'; Sallalich 36'	Report	Špiler (yellow card) 21'; Dangubić (yellow card) 84'; Sokler (yellow card) 87'	Stadium: Ljudski vrt Attendance: 3,500; Referee: Rade Obrenović

30 November 2016 19	Maribor	4–0	Koper	Maribor
20:15 CET	Zahović 9'; Tavares 12', 59'; Vršič 36'; Sallalich (yellow card) 68'; Hotić (yellow card) 77'	Report	Kokorović (yellow card) 50'; Biljan (yellow card) 57'; Teijo (yellow card) 68'	Stadium: Ljudski vrt Attendance: 2,000; Referee: Miran Bukovec

3 December 2016 20	Maribor	1–0	Rudar Velenje	Maribor
20:15 CET	Zahović 81'; Kabha (yellow card) 81'	Report	Vručina (yellow card) 29'; Babić (yellow card) 64'; Mužek (yellow card) 81'; Kašnik (yellow card) 90+3'	Stadium: Ljudski vrt Attendance: 2,500; Referee: Roman Glažar

10 December 2016 21	Domžale	3–2	Maribor	Domžale
16:55 CET	Vetrih 12', 74'; Blažič 32'	Report	Zahović 6' (pen.), 43'; Pihler (yellow card) 38'; Vrhovec (yellow card) 60'; Šme (yellow card) 62'; Šuler (yellow card) 89'	Stadium: Sports Park; Attendance: 1,700; Referee: Roberto Ponis

25 February 2017 22	Maribor	1–0	Olimpija	Maribor
20:15 CET	Zahović 51'; Kabha (yellow card) 58'; Defendi (yellow card) 88'	Report	Avramovski (yellow card) 82'	Stadium: Ljudski vrt Attendance: 12,000; Referee: Damir Skomina

7 March 2017 23	Gorica	2–4	Maribor	Nova Gorica
16:00 CET	Burgič 14' (pen.); Humar (yellow card) 21'; Burgič 72'	Report	Kabha (yellow card) 33'; Vršič 35', 41'; Šuler (yellow card) 59'; Zahović 63', 85'; Novaković (yellow card) 72'	Stadium: Sports Park; Attendance: 1,100; Referee: Dejan Balažič

11 March 2017 24	Maribor	4–1	Aluminij	Maribor
20:15 CET	Zahović 41' (pen.); Novaković 64'; Vršič 66' (f.k.); Tavares 86'	Report	Bizjak (yellow card) 40' (goal) 78'	Stadium: Ljudski vrt Attendance: 4,500; Referee: Roberto Ponis

18 March 2017 25	Celje	1–1	Maribor	Celje
20:15 CET	Barišić (yellow card) 5' (red card) 54'; Volaš 45'; Vidmajer (yellow card) 74'	Report	Novaković 6'; Pihler (yellow card) 44'; Vrhovec (yellow card) 58'; Bajde (yellow card) 87'	Stadium: Arena Petrol; Attendance: 3,500; Referee: Damir Skomina

29 March 2017 26	Maribor	1–0	Radomlje	Maribor
19:30 CEST	Vršič 7'; Sallalich (yellow card) 78'	Report	Jazbec (yellow card) 19'; Cerar (yellow card) 75'; Balić (yellow card) 83'	Stadium: Ljudski vrt Attendance: 3,500; Referee: Vojko Goričan

1 April 2017 27	Krško	1–1	Maribor	Krško
20:15 CEST	Šturm (yellow card) 26'; Dangubić 29' (pen.)	Report	Defendi (yellow card) 28'; Vršič 41'	Stadium: Matija Gubec; Attendance: 1,900; Referee: Mitja Žganec

8 April 2017 28	Koper	2–2	Maribor	Koper
20:15 CEST	Ibričić 10' (pen.) (yellow card) 29'; Park (yellow card) 30'; Datković (yellow card) 73'; Križman 81'; Kokorović (yellow card) 83'	Report	Viler (yellow card) 15'; Novaković 59', 63'	Stadium: Bonifika; Attendance: 1,500; Referee: Rade Obrenović

15 April 2017 29	Rudar Velenje	0–1	Maribor	Velenje
20:15 CEST	Vručina (yellow card) 56'; Zec (yellow card) 90+1'	Report	Zahović 39'; Palčič (yellow card) 61'; Handanović (yellow card) 90+3'	Stadium: Ob Jezeru City Stadium; Attendance: 2,000; Referee: Asmir Sagrković

22 April 2017 30	Maribor	1–0	Domžale	Maribor
20:15 CEST	Tavares 1'; Vrhovec (yellow card) 5'; Mertelj (yellow card) 89'; Viler (yellow card) 90'	Report	Husmani (yellow card) 49'	Stadium: Ljudski vrt Attendance: 4,500; Referee: Dragoslav Perić

29 April 2017 31	Olimpija	0–0	Maribor	Ljubljana
20:30 CEST	Issah (yellow card) 41'	Report	Zahović (yellow card) 35'; Pihler (yellow card) 38'; Novaković (yellow card) 89'	Stadium: Stožice; Attendance: 7,000; Referee: Andrej Žnidaršič

6 May 2017 32	Maribor	2–2	Gorica	Maribor
20:15 CEST	Zahović (yellow card) 37'; Viler (yellow card) 45'; Novaković 52', 87'	Report	Žigon 35'; Filipović (yellow card) 39'; Osuji 72'	Stadium: Ljudski vrt Attendance: 6,000; Referee: Roberto Ponis

14 May 2017 33	Aluminij	3–1	Maribor	Kidričevo
16:55 CEST	Mesec 18', 42'; Kramer 44'; Vrbanec (yellow card) 85'; Bizjak (yellow card) 90+3'	Report	Vrhovec (yellow card) 57'; Hotić (yellow card) 78' (goal) 87' (f.k.)	Stadium: Sports Park; Attendance: 1,200; Referee: Asmir Sagrković

17 May 2017 34	Maribor	0–2	Celje	Maribor
20:15 CEST	Tavares (yellow card) 29'; Rajčević (yellow card) 85'	Report	Požeg Vancaš (yellow card) 26'; Džinić (yellow card) 49'; Volaš (yellow card) 51'; Cvek 67'; Hodžić 85' (o.g.)	Stadium: Ljudski vrt Attendance: 1,200; Referee: Rade Obrenović

21 May 2017 35	Radomlje	1–1	Maribor	Murska Sobota
16:55 CEST	Nunić 53'; Lidjan (yellow card) 74'; Primc (yellow card) 87'	Report	Tavares 67'	Stadium: Fazanerija; Attendance: 1,200; Referee: Bojan Mertik

27 May 2017 36	Maribor	1–0	Krško	Maribor
16:55 CEST	Rajčević (yellow card) 37'; Hotić 45'; Viler (yellow card) 67'	Report	Mujan (yellow card) 35'; Šturm (yellow card) 60'; Pušaver (yellow card) 89'	Stadium: Ljudski vrt Attendance: 7,000; Referee: Miran Bukovec

Colour key: Green = Maribor win; Yellow = draw; Red = opponents win.

Notes

1. The match was originally scheduled on 4 March 2017, however, it was postponed to a later date because of poor weather conditions and waterlogged pitch.

== Slovenian Cup ==
14 September 2016 Round of 16	Radomlje	0–2	Maribor	Domžale
18:00 CEST	Stoiljković (yellow card) 27'; Osmanaj (yellow card) 80'	Report	Defendi (yellow card) 55'; Vršič 74'; Šuler (yellow card) 80'; Kabha 90+3'	Stadium: Sports Park; Attendance: 500; Referee: Vojko Goričan

19 October 2016 Quarter-finals 1st leg	Gorica	1–1	Maribor	Nova Gorica
18:00 CEST	Grudina (yellow card) 31'; Celcer (yellow card) 34'; Kotnik 58' (f.k.)	Report	Zahović 44'; Hotić (yellow card) 62'; Sallalich (yellow card) 71'; Mezga (yellow card) 89'	Stadium: Sports Park; Attendance: 700; Referee: Dragoslav Perić

26 October 2016 Quarter-finals 2nd leg	Maribor	0–0 (1–1 (a) agg.)	Gorica	Maribor
17:15 CEST	Šme (yellow card) 33'; Sallalich (yellow card) 48'; Hotić (yellow card) 55'; Obradović (yellow card) 90+2'	Report	Kolenc (yellow card) 22'; Burgić (yellow card) 45'	Stadium: Ljudski vrt Attendance: 3,000; Referee: Damir Skomina

5 April 2017 Semi-finals 1st leg	Olimpija	2–1	Maribor	Ljubljana
20:15 CEST (UTC+02:00)	Eleke (yellow card) 41'; Wobay (yellow card) 48'; Benko 81', 85'; Štiglec (yellow card) 90+4'	Report	Vrhovec (yellow card) 40'; Vršič 48' (yellow card) 64'; Šuler (yellow card) 79'	Stadium: Stožice; Attendance: 6,000; Referee: Matej Jug

12 April 2017 Semi-finals 2nd leg	Maribor	1–1 (2–3 agg.)	Olimpija	Maribor
17:15 CEST (UTC+02:00)	Hotić 71'	Report	Eleke (yellow card) 18'; Crețu 32' (yellow card) 45'; Klinar (yellow card) 63'; Vodišek (yellow card) 66'	Stadium: Ljudski vrt Attendance: 10,500; Referee: Damir Skomina

Colour key: Green = Maribor win; Yellow = draw; Red = opponents win.

== UEFA Europa League ==
=== Second qualifying round ===
14 July 2016 First leg	Maribor (Slovenia)	0–0	(Bulgaria) Levski Sofia	Maribor, Slovenia
20:00 CEST		Report	Hristov (yellow card) 31'; Kostadinov (yellow card) 35'; Jorgačević (yellow card) 65'	Stadium: Ljudski vrt Attendance: 7,345; Referee: Cristian Balaj (Romania)

21 July 2016 Second leg	Levski Sofia (Bulgaria)	1–1 (1–1 (a) agg.)	(Slovenia) Maribor	Sofia, Bulgaria
19:00 CEST	Aleksandrov (yellow card) 6'; Narh 22'; Kostadinov (yellow card) 65'; Narh (yellow card) 90'	Report	Kabha (yellow card) 47'; Tavares 68'; Hotić (yellow card) 76'; Šuler (yellow card) 82'	Stadium: Georgi Asparuhov; Attendance: 17,600; Referee: Michael Tykgaard (Denmark)

=== Third qualifying round ===
28 July 2016 First leg	Aberdeen (Scotland)	1–1	(Slovenia) Maribor	Aberdeen, Scotland
20:45 CEST	Hayes (yellow card) 31' (goal) 88'; Rooney (yellow card) 90+3'	Report	Kabha (yellow card) 25'; Vrhovec (yellow card) 67'; Novaković 83'; Bohar (yellow card) 90+1'; Tavares (yellow card) 90+4'	Stadium: Pittodrie Stadium; Attendance: 17,105; Referee: Tore Hansen (Norway)

4 August 2016 Second leg	Maribor (Slovenia)	1–0 (2–1 agg.)	(Scotland) Aberdeen	Maribor, Slovenia
20:15 CEST	Handanović (yellow card) 23'; Novaković (yellow card) 38'; Janža (yellow card) 54'; Kabha (yellow card) 83'; Shinnie 90+3' (o.g.)	Report	Shinnie (yellow card) 36'; Stockley (yellow card) 53' (red card) 61'; Wright (yellow card) 90+3'	Stadium: Ljudski vrt Attendance: 9,796; Referee: Nikola Popov (Bulgaria)

=== Play-off round ===
18 August 2016 First leg	Gabala (Azerbaijan)	3–1	(Slovenia) Maribor	Baku, Azerbaijan
19:00 CEST	Zenjov 37'; Dabo 50', 52'	Report	Tavares 17'; Šuler (yellow card) 29'; Vrhovec (yellow card) 58'	Stadium: Bakcell Arena; Attendance: 4,723; Referee: Aleksei Kulbakov (Belarus)

25 August 2016 Second leg	Maribor (Slovenia)	1–0 (2–3 agg.)	(Azerbaijan) Gabala	Maribor, Slovenia
20:15 CEST	Janža (yellow card) 49'; Pihler (yellow card) 60'; Šme (yellow card) 65'; Tavares 66'; Kabha (yellow card) 67'	Report	Vernydub (yellow card) 38'; Weeks (red card) 69'; Mammadov (yellow card) 87'; Ozobić (yellow card) 89'	Stadium: Ljudski vrt Attendance: 9,000; Referee: Viktor Kassai (Hungary)

Colour key: Green = Maribor win; Yellow = draw; Red = opponents win.

Notes

2. Gabala played their home match at Bakcell Arena in Baku, as their own Gabala City Stadium did not meet UEFA criteria.

== Friendlies ==
17 June 2016 1	Mattersburg (Austria)	0–0	(Slovenia) Maribor	Jennersdorf, Austria
18:00 CEST		Report		Referee: Thomas Paukovits

21 June 2016 2	Maribor (Slovenia)	2–2	(Georgia (country)) Chikhura Sachkhere	Bakovci, Slovenia
17:00 CEST	Tavares 18'; Štor 58'	Report	Lobjanidze 25', 39'	Stadium: ŠRC Bakovci; Referee: Štefan Fekonja

25 June 2016 3	Maribor (Slovenia)	2–3	(Poland) Jagiellonia Białystok	Beltinci, Slovenia
18:15 CEST	Tomasik 66' (o.g.); Bajde 90'	Report	Górski 21'; Mystkowski 28'; Černych 57'	Stadium: Beltinci Sports Park; Referee: Darjan Kovačič

29 June 2016 4	Sturm Graz (Austria)	1–2	(Slovenia) Maribor	Gralla, Austria
19:00 CEST	Matić 43'	Report	Sallalich 20'; Bohar 77'	Stadium: Sportanlage Gralla; Attendance: 800; Referee: Alexander Harkam

3 July 2016 5	Maribor (Slovenia)	2–1	(North Macedonia) Vardar	Odranci, Slovenia
17:00 CEST	Šuler 45'; Tavares 60'	Report	Felipe 78' (f.k.)	Stadium: ŠRC Odranci; Referee: Bojan Mertik

6 July 2016 6	Maribor (Slovenia)	1–1	(Romania) Astra Giurgiu	Kidričevo, Slovenia
17:30 CEST	Kabha 48'	Report	Júnior 9'	Stadium: Sports Park; Referee: Niko Mihelič

9 July 2016 7	Maribor (Slovenia)	0–0	(Scotland) Celtic	Maribor, Slovenia
19:00 CEST		Report		Stadium: Ljudski vrt Attendance: 3,000; Referee: Tadej Mežnar

7 October 2016 8	Maribor (Slovenia)	0–3	(Hungary) Szombathelyi Haladás	Odranci, Slovenia
15:00 CEST		http://www.nkmaribor.com/novice/?id=7212 (in Slovene)	Gaál 13'; Dombi 74'; Rácz 80'	Stadium: ŠRC Odranci; Referee: Bojan Mertik

11 November 2016 9	Maribor (Slovenia)	0–1	(Croatia) Inter Zaprešić	Maribor, Slovenia
14:15 CET		http://www.nkmaribor.com/novice/?id=7296 (in Slovene)	Mamut 83'	Stadium: Ljudski vrt Referee: Tadej Mežnar

18 January 2017 10	Nafta 1903	1–2	Maribor	Lendava, Slovenia
16:00 CET	Marciuš 15'	Report	Vršič 32'; Bohar 68'	Stadium: 2. OŠ Lendava Field; Referee: Hozjan

21 January 2017 11	ZTE (Hungary)	1–3	(Slovenia) Maribor	Zalaegerszeg, Hungary
14:00 CET	Végh 4'	Report	Omoregie 16'; Štor 70'; Sallallich 87'	Stadium: ZTE Football Centre; Referee: Dávid Lapath

24 January 2017 12	Maribor (Slovenia)	5–0	(Austria) Kapfenberger SV	Maribor, Slovenia
14:00 CET	Vršič 16'; Defendi 30'; Vršič 40' (pen.); Meusburger 44' (o.g.); Novaković 60'	Report		Stadium: Ljudski vrt (artificial turf); Referee: Tadej Mežnar

28 January 2017 13	Maribor (Slovenia)	4–1	(Croatia) Gorica	Maribor, Slovenia
14:00 CET	Tavares 4'; Novaković 51'; Hotić 55' (pen.); Novaković 77'	Report	Tatar 14'	Stadium: Ljudski vrt (artificial turf); Referee: Miha Kamplet

1 February 2017 14	Maribor (Slovenia)	1–1	(Russia) Arsenal Tula	Belek, Turkey
15:00 CET	Pihler 43'	Report	Denisov 3'	Stadium: Titanic Deluxe Sports Centre; Referee: Isa Kas (Turkey)

4 February 2017 15	Maribor (Slovenia)	0–0	(Belarus) BATE Borisov	Belek, Turkey
15:00 CET		Report		Stadium: Cornelia Sport Center; Referee: Rifet Çakır (Turkey)

6 February 2017 16	Maribor (Slovenia)	1–1	(Ukraine) Oleksandriya	Belek, Turkey
15:00 CET	Bohar 5'	Report	Uskoković 15' (o.g.)	Stadium: Susesi Sport Center; Referee: Askhat Abdanbaev (Kazakhstan)

8 February 2017 17	Maribor (Slovenia)	2–2	(Bulgaria) Ludogorets	Belek, Turkey
14:00 CET	Zahović 5', 31' (pen.)	Report	Keșerü 63'; Lukoki 84'	Stadium: Titanic Deluxe Sports Centre; Referee: Denis Ismailov (Kazakhstan)

10 February 2017 18	Maribor (Slovenia)	0–1	(Czech Republic) Slovácko	Belek, Turkey
17:00 CET		Report	Čivić 30'	Stadium: Susesi Sport Center; Referee: Roman Galimov (Russia)

11 February 2017 19	Maribor (Slovenia)	1–3	(Montenegro) Budućnost Podgorica	Belek, Turkey
15:00 CET	Bajde 48'	Report	Raičević 15'; Raičković 32'; Mirković 64'	Stadium: Susesi Sport Center; Attendance: Gediminas Mažeika (Lithuania)

18 February 2017 20	Maribor	1–1	Rudar Velenje	Maribor, Slovenia
15:00 CET	Novaković 34'	Report	Vručina 55' (pen.)	Stadium: Ljudski vrt Referee: Slavko Vinčić

Colour key: Green = Maribor win; Yellow = draw; Red = opponents win.

== Squad statistics ==
=== Key ===
Players

- No. = Shirt number
- Pos. = Playing position
- GK = Goalkeeper
- DF = Defender
- MF = Midfielder
- FW = Forward

Nationality

- = Bosnia and Herzegovina
- = Brazil
- = Croatia
- = France
- = Israel
- (North Macedonia) = Macedonia
- = Nigeria
- = Senegal
- = Serbia
- = Slovenia

Competitions

- = Appearances
- = Goals
- = Yellow card
- (red card) = Red card

Designations

- ‡ The player was selected in the official 2016–17 Slovenian PrvaLiga team of the season

=== Appearances and goals ===
Correct as of 27 May 2017, after the match against Krško. Flags indicate national team as has been defined under FIFA eligibility rules. Players may hold more than one non-FIFA nationality. Only the players, which made at least one appearance for the first team, are listed.

List of Maribor players, who represented the team during the 2016–17 season, and displaying their statistics during that timeframe
No.	Pos.	Name		Goal		Goal		Goal		Goal
No.	Pos.	Name	League		Cup		Europa League		Total	
2	DF	(Slovenia) Adis Hodžić	7	0	—	—	2	0	9	0
3	DF	(Slovenia) Erik Janža	16	0	2	0	6	0	24	0
4	DF	(Slovenia) Marko Šuler ‡	32	3	3	0	6	0	41	3
5	MF	(Slovenia) Blaž Vrhovec	27	0	5	0	6	0	38	0
6	MF	(Slovenia) Aleks Pihler	31	3	2	0	4	0	37	3
7	DF	(Slovenia) Žan Karničnik	1	0	—	—	—	—	1	0
7	MF	(Bosnia and Herzegovina) Amar Rahmanović	1	0	—	—	—	—	1	0
8	MF	(Israel) Sintayehu Sallalich	22	1	3	0	4	0	29	1
9	FW	(Brazil) Marcos Tavares	33	9	5	0	6	3	44	12
10	MF	(Slovenia) Dino Hotić	28	2	3	1	3	0	34	3
11	FW	(Slovenia) Milivoje Novaković	26	11	3	0	6	1	35	12
14	FW	(Nigeria) Sunny Omoregie	14	5	2	0	2	0	18	5
18	MF	(Slovenia) Sandi Ogrinec	6	0	1	0	—	—	7	0
20	FW	(Slovenia) Gregor Bajde	10	1	1	0	6	0	17	1
22	MF	(Slovenia) Dare Vršič ‡	26	9	3	2	6	0	35	11
24	MF	(Israel) Marwan Kabha	20	1	3	1	5	0	28	2
26	DF	(Slovenia) Aleksander Rajčević	12	0	1	0	—	—	13	0
28	DF	(Slovenia) Mitja Viler	18	0	3	0	—	—	21	0
29	DF	(Slovenia) Matej Palčič	17	0	4	0	—	—	21	0
30	MF	(Albania) Valon Ahmedi	5	0	—	—	—	—	5	0
31	MF	(Slovenia) Daniel Vujčić	1	0	—	—	—	—	1	0
32	DF	(Montenegro) Luka Uskoković	1	0	—	—	—	—	1	0
33	GK	(Slovenia) Jasmin Handanović ‡	32	0	—	—	6	0	38	0
35	DF	(Brazil) Rodrigo Defendi ‡	25	0	5	0	4	0	34	0
39	MF	(Slovenia) Damjan Bohar	20	1	4	0	5	0	29	1
44	DF	(Slovenia) Denis Šme	15	0	2	0	6	0	23	0
45	DF	(Slovenia) Robert Pušaver	1	0	—	—	—	—	1	0
69	GK	(Croatia) Matko Obradović	4	0	5	0	—	—	9	0
70	MF	(Slovenia) Aleš Mertelj	12	0	2	0	1	0	15	0
88	MF	(Croatia) Dejan Mezga	4	0	3	0	—	—	7	0
90	FW	(Slovenia) Luka Zahović ‡	28	15	5	1	—	—	33	16
Own goals			—	2	—	—	—	1	—	3
Totals			—	63	—	5	—	5	—	73

=== Discipline ===
Correct as of 27 May 2017, after the match against Krško. Flags indicate national team as has been defined under FIFA eligibility rules. Players may hold more than one non-FIFA nationality. If a player received two yellow cards in a match and was subsequently sent off, the numbers count as two yellow cards, one red card.

List of Maribor players, who represented the team during the 2016–17 season, and displaying their statistics during that timeframe
No.	Pos.	Name	Yellow card	Red card	Yellow card	Red card	Yellow card	Red card	Yellow card	Red card
No.	Pos.	Name	League		Cup		Europa League		Total	
2	DF	(Slovenia) Adis Hodžić	2	0	—	—	0	0	2	0
3	DF	(Slovenia) Erik Janža	5	0	0	0	2	0	7	0
4	DF	(Slovenia) Marko Šuler ‡	4	0	2	0	2	0	8	0
5	MF	(Slovenia) Blaž Vrhovec	7	0	1	0	2	0	10	0
6	MF	(Slovenia) Aleks Pihler	5	0	0	0	1	0	6	0
8	MF	(Israel) Sintayehu Sallalich	3	0	2	0	0	0	5	0
9	FW	(Brazil) Marcos Tavares	2	0	0	0	1	0	3	0
10	MF	(Slovenia) Dino Hotić	2	0	2	0	1	0	5	0
11	FW	(Slovenia) Milivoje Novaković	3	0	0	0	1	0	4	0
20	FW	(Slovenia) Gregor Bajde	1	0	0	0	0	0	1	0
22	MF	(Slovenia) Dare Vršič ‡	3	0	1	0	0	0	4	0
24	MF	(Israel) Marwan Kabha	6	0	0	0	4	0	10	0
26	DF	(Slovenia) Aleksander Rajčević	2	0	0	0	—	—	2	0
28	DF	(Slovenia) Mitja Viler	5	0	0	0	—	—	5	0
29	DF	(Slovenia) Matej Palčič	1	0	0	0	—	—	1	0
33	GK	(Slovenia) Jasmin Handanović ‡	2	0	—	—	1	0	3	0
35	DF	(Brazil) Rodrigo Defendi ‡	4	0	1	0	0	0	5	0
39	MF	(Slovenia) Damjan Bohar	0	0	0	0	1	0	1	0
44	DF	(Slovenia) Denis Šme	4	0	1	0	1	0	6	0
69	GK	(Croatia) Matko Obradović	0	0	1	0	—	—	1	0
70	MF	(Slovenia) Aleš Mertelj	2	0	0	0	0	0	2	0
88	MF	(Croatia) Dejan Mezga	0	0	1	0	—	—	1	0
90	FW	(Slovenia) Luka Zahović ‡	4	0	0	0	—	—	4	0
Totals			67	0	12	0	17	0	96	0

=== Foreign players ===
Below is the list of foreign players who have made appearances for the club during the 2016–17 season. Players primary citizenship is listed first.

EU Nationals

- (Croatia) (Slovenia) Dejan Mezga
- (Croatia) Matko Obradović

EU Nationals (Dual citizenship)

- (Brazil) (Italy) Rodrigo Defendi
- (Brazil) (Slovenia) Marcos Tavares

Non-EU Nationals

- (Bosnia and Herzegovina) Amar Rahmanović
- (Israel) Marwan Kabha
- (Israel) Sintayehu Sallalich
- (Nigeria) Sunny Omoregie

== Transfers and loans ==
=== In ===
No.	Pos.	Nat.	Name	Age	EU	Moving from	Type	Transfer window	Ends	Transfer fee	Source
6	MF	(Slovenia)	Aleks Pihler	22	EU	(Slovenia) Zavrč	Transfer	Summer	2019	Undisclosed	
5	MF	(Slovenia)	Blaž Vrhovec	24	EU	(Slovenia) Celje	Transfer	Summer	2019	Undisclosed, alleged to be around €500,000	
14	FW	(Nigeria)	Sunny Omoregie	27	Non-EU	(Slovenia) Celje	Transfer	Summer	2019	Undisclosed, part of Blaž Vrhovec transfer	
—	FW	(Serbia)	Zoran Baljak	20	Non-EU	(Serbia) Dinamo Vranje	Transfer	Summer	—	Free transfer	
—	MF	(Slovenia)	Chris Cener	15	EU	(Austria) Rapid Wien	Transfer	Summer	—	Undisclosed, youth transfer	
88	MF	(Croatia)	Dejan Mezga	31	EU	(Cyprus) Apollon Limassol	Transfer	Summer	2017	Free	

=== Out ===
No.	Pos.	Nat.	Name	Age	EU	Moving to	Type	Transfer window	Transfer fee	Source
6	MF	(Senegal)	Welle N'Diaye	26	Non-EU	Free agent	Contract ended	Summer	Free	
10	MF	(North Macedonia)	Agim Ibraimi	27	EU	(Kazakhstan) Astana	Transfer	Summer	Free	
5	MF	(Slovenia)	Željko Filipović	27	EU	(Belgium) Mechelen	Transfer	Summer	Undisclosed, alleged to be around €500,000	
14	FW	(France)	Jean-Philippe Mendy	29	EU	(China) Shijiazhuang Ever Bright	Transfer	Summer	Undisclosed, alleged to be around €2 million	
—	DF	(Slovenia)	Žan Florjanc	18	EU	(Slovenia) Aluminij	Transfer	Summer	Youth transfer	
—	FW	(Serbia)	Zoran Baljak	20	Non-EU	Retirement	—	—	Contract ended, player deceased	
—	MF	(Slovenia)	Damjan Marjanović	20	EU	Retirement	—	—	Contract ended, player deceased	
—	GK	(Serbia)	Ljubomir Moravac	19	Non-EU	Retirement	—	—	Career ended	
—	MF	(Croatia)	Sven Dodlek	20	EU	(Slovenia) Rudar Velenje	Transfer	Summer	Free	
7	MF	(Bosnia and Herzegovina)	Amar Rahmanović	22	Non-EU	(Slovenia) Celje	Transfer	Summer	Free	
3	DF	(Slovenia)	Erik Janža	23	EU	(Czech Republic) Viktoria Plzeň	Transfer	Winter	Undisclosed, alleged to be around €700,000	
88	MF	(Croatia)	Dejan Mezga	31	EU	(Portugal) Nacional	Transfer	Winter	Free	
—	FW	(Slovenia)	Bian Paul Šauperl	21	EU	(Slovenia) Veržej	Transfer	Winter	Free	

Notes

3. Agim Ibraimi signed a two-and-a-half year contract with Kazakhstan Premier League side Astana, with the contract reportedly being worth a total of €2.25 million. Astana acquired the player as a free agent, with Ibraimi, whose contract with Maribor was set to expire in 2019, presumably buying out his contract for an undisclosed fee.

=== Loans in ===
No.	Pos.	Nat.	Name	Age	EU	Moving from	Type	Transfer window	Ends	Transfer fee	Source
90	FW	(Slovenia)	Luka Zahović	20	EU	(Netherlands) Heerenveen	Loan	Summer	2017	—	

=== Loans out ===
No.	Pos.	Nat.	Name	Age	EU	Moving to	Type	Transfer window	Transfer fee	Source
97	FW	(Slovenia)	Martin Kramarič	18	EU	(Slovenia) Krško	Loan	Summer	—	
25	MF	(Serbia)	Ranko Moravac	21	EU	(Slovenia) Krško	Loan	Summer	—	
72	MF	(Slovenia)	Dejan Vokić	20	EU	(Slovenia) Krško	Loan	Summer	—	
16	DF	(Slovenia)	Damjan Vuklišević	20	EU	(Slovenia) Krško	Loan	Summer	—	
—	GK	(Slovenia)	Tadej Ponudič	18	EU	(Slovenia) Aluminij	Loan	Summer	—	
—	DF	(Slovenia)	Tim Vorše	18	EU	(Slovenia) Aluminij	Loan	Summer	—	
—	DF	(Slovenia)	Robert Pušaver	21	EU	(Slovenia) Krško	Loan	Summer	—	
20	FW	(Slovenia)	Gregor Bajde	22	EU	(Italy) Novara	Loan	Summer	—	
14	FW	(Nigeria)	Sunny Omoregie	28	Non-EU	(Israel) Hapoel Kfar Saba	Loan	Winter	—	
—	MF	(Slovenia)	Amir Dervišević	24	EU	(Slovenia) Veržej	Loan	Winter	—	
—	MF	(Slovenia)	Dejan Vokić	20	EU	(Slovenia) Veržej	Loan	Winter	—	

== See also ==
- List of NK Maribor seasons
