= Peter Binkovski =

Slovenian footballer

Personal information
- Date of birth: 28 June 1972 (age 54)
- Place of birth: SFR Yugoslavia
- Height: 1.81 m (5 ft 11 in)
- Position: Midfielder

Senior career*
Years	Team	Apps	(Gls)
1989–1996	Maribor	196	(15)
1996	Öster	14	(0)
1997	Brummel Sendai	18	(0)
1998	First Vienna	3	(0)
1998	Maccabi Jaffa	4	(0)
1998	Korotan Prevalje	1	(0)
1999	Maribor	2	(0)
1999	Pohorje	9	(0)
2000–2001	Rudar Velenje	42	(0)
2002	Domžale	9	(0)
2002–2003	Korotan Prevalje	4	(0)
2003	Železničar Maribor	12	(1)
2005	SV Wildon	2	(0)

International career
1992	Slovenia U21	1	(0)
1994–1996	Slovenia	16	(1)
- * Club domestic league appearances and goals

Peter Binkovski (born 28 June 1972) is a retired Slovenian football midfielder, playing mainly for Maribor and the Slovenia national team before short spells in four other countries followed by a return clubs to his homeland. He was capped 16 times and scored one goal for Slovenia between 1994 and 1996.

== International career ==
Binkovski made his debut for Slovenia in a February 1994 friendly match against Georgia, coming on as a 74th-minute substitute for Alfred Jermaniš, and earned a total of 16 caps, scoring 1 goal. His final international was a November 1996 World Cup qualification match against Bosnia and Herzegovina.

== Personal life ==
Binkovski's father Boris was also a footballer.
