= Danijel Brezič =

Slovenian footballer (born 1976)

Personal information
- Full name: Danijel Brezič
- Date of birth: 15 February 1976 (age 50)
- Place of birth: Murska Sobota, Yugoslavia
- Height: 1.74 m (5 ft 9 in)
- Position: Midfielder

Senior career*
Years	Team	Apps	(Gls)
1993–1997	Mura	99	(4)
1997–1999	Rudar Velenje	60	(4)
1999–2001	Austria Lustenau	61	(7)
2001–2002	R.W.D. Molenbeek	9	(0)
2002–2005	Maribor	70	(4)
2005–2007	Celje	58	(2)
2007–2009	Domžale	60	(3)
2009–2010	Interblock	13	(0)
2010–2011	Celje	44	(0)
2011–2012	Grazer AK II	4	(0)
2013–2015	SG Steinfeld	15	(2)

International career
1998	Slovenia	1	(0)
- * Club domestic league appearances and goals as of 2 August 2009 (UTC)

Danijel Brezič (born 15 February 1976 in Murska Sobota) is a Slovenian retired football midfielder, who last played for Grazer AK in the Austrian Regional League Central.

== Club career ==
He previously played for R.W.D. Molenbeek in the Belgian First Division. He later played in the Austrian lower leagues.

== International career ==
Brezič made his debut for Slovenia in a March 1998 friendly match against Poland, coming on as a 88th-minute substitute for Robert Englaro. It proved to be his sole international appearance.

== Honours ==
=== Mura Murska Sobota ===
- Slovenian Cup: 1994–95

=== Rudar Velenje ===
- Slovenian Cup: 1997–98

=== Maribor ===
- Slovenian PrvaLiga: 2002–03
- Slovenian Cup: 2003–04

=== Domžale ===
- Slovenian PrvaLiga: 2007–08
- Slovenian Supercup: 2007

== See also ==
- List of NK Maribor players
