= Tomislav Prosen =

Yugoslav footballer and manager

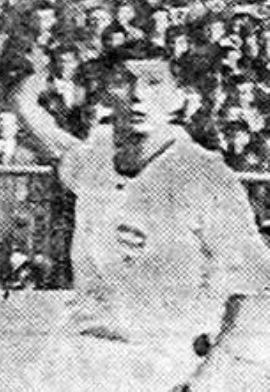

Tomislav Prosen (born 24 December 1943 in Sisak) is a Yugoslav retired football player and manager. He is considered one of the greatest players who played for Slovenian club NK Maribor, where he spent much of his career. Prosen is Maribor's second all-time most capped player with 391 appearances between 1962 and 1979. He played in the 1967–68 Mitropa Cup final for Red Star Belgrade as a guest player. He also played 4 Eredivisie matches for NEC in 1971.
