= Jože Prelogar =

Slovenian footballer

Personal information
- Full name: Jože Prelogar
- Date of birth: 5 March 1959 (age 67)
- Place of birth: Ljubljana, SFR Yugoslavia
- Height: 1.80 m (5 ft 11 in)
- Position: Midfielder

Senior career*
| Years | Team | Apps | (Gls) |
| 1977–1980 | Rudar Velenje | | |
| 1980–1983 | Olimpija | 10 | (0) |
| 1983–1986 | Maribor | | |
| 1986–1987 | Olimpija | | |
| 1987–1992 | Austria Klagenfurt | 122 | (15) |
| 1991–1993 | Krka | 24 | (3) |
| 1993 | Celje | 10 | (4) |
| 1993–1994 | Gorica | 14 | (3) |
| 1994–1995 | Železničar Ljubljana | 26 | (10) |
| 1995–1996 | ASK Klagenfurt | | |
| 1996–1998 | Livar | | |

Managerial career
- 1998–2001: Livar
- 2001–2003: Olimpija
- 2002–2003: Slovenia U17
- 2003–2004: Slovenia U18
- 2004–2007: Slovenia (assistant)
- 2007: Interblock (assistant)
- 2007–2009: Radomlje
- 2009–2010: Austria Kärnten
- 2011–2013: Adria
- 2013–2014: Austria Klagenfurt
- 2014: SAK Klagenfurt
- 2015: FC Welzenegg
- 2015: SV Sachsenburg
- 2015–2016: SG Drautal
- 2017-2018: FC St. Veit
- 2018–2019: ASK Klagenfurt
- * Club domestic league appearances and goals

Jože Prelogar (born 5 March 1959) is a Slovenian football manager and former player. He played as a midfielder.
