= Branko Horjak =

Yugoslav footballer

Personal information
- Date of birth: 11 September 1950 (age 76)
- Place of birth: SFR Yugoslavia

Senior career*
Years	Team	Apps	(Gls)
1970–1979	Maribor		

International career
- Yugoslavia U21

Managerial career
- 1993–1994: Maribor
- 1995: Maribor
- 2000: Aluminij
- 2004–2005: Maribor
- 2007–2008: Maribor
- * Club domestic league appearances and goals

Branko Horjak (born 11 September 1950) is a Yugoslav retired football player and manager. He is considered one of the greatest players who played for Slovenian club Maribor, where he played for nine seasons between 1970 and 1979. He is the second all-time top goalscorer for Maribor with 117 goals in 268 official appearances. During his final seasons he played in the Austrian lower leagues, where he took on the role of a manager.

In Slovenia he coached Aluminij and Železničar Maribor, and managed Maribor on four occasions. During his coaching career he has also managed Maribor's youth squads.

== International career ==
Horjak was never capped by Yugoslavia at full international level, however, he was part of the country's under-21 football team.

== Coaching career ==
Horjak knew he would like to become a football coach even during high school. He began and completed his coaching licence in Austria and took the role of managing an amateur football club from Poljčane. In 1993, he became head coach of Maribor for the first time and led the team to the second round of the 1993–94 UEFA Cup, where his side was narrowly eliminated by Borussia Dortmund (2–1 on aggregate). During the same season Horjak won his first trophy as a coach, after winning the 1993–94 Slovenian Football Cup. However, after finishing third in the national league he was sacked. In the next decade he coached Železničar Maribor and Aluminij, and was involved with Maribor on several occasions, either as the coach of the main squad or the club's youth selections. With Železničar (two years) and Aluminij (three years), he competed in the Slovenian Second League and came close to qualifying for the top division with both clubs.

== Personal life ==
Horjak is married and has two daughters.

== See also ==
- List of NK Maribor players
