= Milan Arnejčič =

Slovenian footballer (1942–2024)

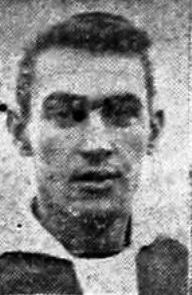

Personal information
- Date of birth: 18 October 1942
- Place of birth: Marburg, Reichsgau Styria, Nazi Germany
- Date of death: 8 March 2024 (aged 81)
- Place of death: Maribor, Slovenia
- Position: Forward

Youth career
- Železničar Maribor

Senior career*
Years	Team	Apps	(Gls)
1959–1960	Železničar Maribor		
1960–1969	Maribor		
1969–1970	Red Star Belgrade	12	(3)
1970–1971	Grazer AK	12	(4)
1971–1978	Maribor		
- * Club domestic league appearances and goals

Milan Arnejčič (18 October 1942 – 8 March 2024) was a Slovenian professional footballer who played as a forward.

== Career ==
Born in Maribor on 18 October 1942, Arnejčič started playing with Železničar Maribor and helped them win the 1960 Slovenian regional cup by scoring two of the four goals of his club in the victory in the final over NK Ljubljana. In 1960, he moved to NK Maribor. During the 1960s he became one of the most prominent Slovenian players. He was part of Maribor team that got the promotion to the Yugoslav First League in 1967. He played with Maribor until 1969, making 58 appearances and scoring 15 goals in the top tier during the last two seasons there.

In 1969, he joined Red Star Belgrade, who had won the Yugoslav championship in the last two seasons in 1968 and 1969. In the 1969–70 season Arnejčič joined Red Star, the club won the double (league and cup) with Arnejčič contributing 12 league appearances and 3 league goals for Red Star's third Yugoslav title in a row. Red Star was interested in bringing as well Tomislav Prosen and Mladen Kranjc, who, along with Arnejčič, were the main players of Maribor, however at the end they only brought Arnejčič in a deal which meant that Milan Janković, Vladislav Bogićević and Rade Radić moved to Maribor.

After winning both national titles with Red Star in only one season, Arnejčič failed to impress, and he moved abroad in summer 1970 by joining Nationalliga (predecessor of the Austrian Bundesliga) side Grazer AK. He made 12 league appearances and scored 4 goals in the 1970–71 Austrian football championship in which GAK finished in 11th place.

In summer 1971 Arnejčič returned to his home-town club NK Maribor, still playing in the Yugoslav First League, although in the first season he returned, 1971–72, they finished bottom of the league and were relegated to the Yugoslav Second League. Despite those events, Arnejčič kept playing with NK Maribor all the way until 1978, when he retired. In total he spent 16 seasons with Maribor playing 286 matches and scoring 73 goals.

== Death ==
Arnejčič died in Maribor on 8 March 2024, at the age of 81.

== Honours ==
Red Star

- Yugoslav First League: 1969–70
- Yugoslav Cup: 1970

== See also ==
- List of NK Maribor players
