= Mladen Kranjc =

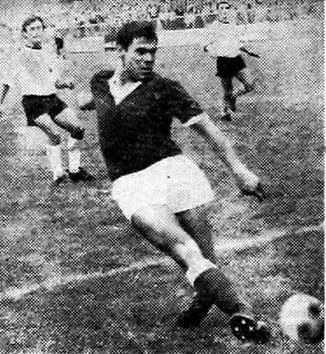
Mladen Kranjc playing for Maribor in 1969.

Mladen Kranjc (12 April 1945 – 22 October 1988) was a Croatian-Slovenian footballer who played as a forward.

== Career ==
Kranjc was born in Varaždin, present day Croatia, and played for Sloboda Varaždin before transferring to Slovenian club Maribor. Dubbed as the črni biser (English: The black pearl), Kranjc spent the majority of his football career playing for the Slovenian side, having spent there a total of 12 seasons during the 1960s and 1970s. He is regarded as one of the best players in the history of the club, and was the best goalscorer for the team in each of its five seasons spent in the Yugoslav top division, having scored a total of 54 league goals. His success eventually led to his transfer to one of the top Yugoslav clubs, Dinamo Zagreb, in 1972. He played in Zagreb for one season and then moved to Olimpija. In 1974 he returned to Maribor and remained there until his retirement in 1977. Kranjc has made a total of 311 appearances for Maribor, scoring 104 goals in the process. He died at the age of 43, after being involved in a motorcycle accident in Dolnja Počehova.

== See also ==
- List of NK Maribor players
