= Martin Pregelj =

Slovenian footballer

Personal information
- Full name: Martin Pregelj
- Date of birth: 6 May 1977 (age 49)
- Place of birth: Koper, SFR Yugoslavia
- Height: 1.87 m (6 ft 2 in)
- Position: Central midfielder

Senior career*
Years	Team	Apps	(Gls)
1995–1999	Koper	49	(3)
1999–2001	Maribor	38	(0)
2001–2003	Sturm Graz	27	(1)
2003–2004	Enosis Neon Paralimni	14	(2)
2004	Koper	1	(0)
2005–2007	Maribor	48	(15)
2007–2009	Interblock	35	(6)
2009	Mura 05	5	(1)
2011–2012	Stojnci		
2012	Železničar Maribor	3	(1)

Managerial career
- 2021: Izola
- * Club domestic league appearances and goals

Martin Pregelj (born 6 May 1977) is a Slovenian football manager and former player who played as a midfielder.
