= Milan Žurman =

Slovenian footballer and manager (1961–2024)

Personal information
- Date of birth: 6 April 1961
- Date of death: 11 April 2024 (aged 63)
- Position: Forward

Senior career*
Years	Team	Apps	(Gls)
1981–1989	Maribor	213	(58)
1989–1991	SVA Kindberg		
1991–1994	SVL Flavia Solva		
1994–1996	Rudar Velenje	51	(15)
1996–1997	Maribor	26	(4)
1997–2005	SV Wildon		
2005	SV Strass		
2005–2006	TuS Heiligenkreuz	17	(3)
2006	SV Wildon		

Managerial career
- 2014–2015: Rapid Kapfenberg
- 2015–2016: Kapfenberger SV
- * Club domestic league appearances and goals

Milan Žurman (6 April 1961 – 11 April 2024) was a Slovenian football player and manager. A forward, he spent majority of his career with Slovenian club Maribor, where he played between 1981 and 1989 and from 1996 to 1997, making 276 appearances and scoring 82 goals for the club across all competitions. He was also a member of another Slovenian club, Rudar Velenje, where he spent two seasons. Outside Slovenia, he only played for the Austrian lower league clubs. In addition to football, he also played futsal from 1984. Žurman died on 11 April 2024, at the age of 63.
