= Aleks Pihler =

Slovenian footballer (born 1994)

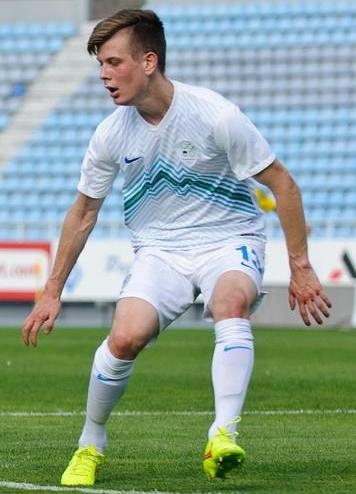
- Pihler with Slovenia U21 in 2015

Personal information
- Date of birth: 15 January 1994 (age 32)
- Place of birth: Ptuj, Slovenia
- Height: 1.83 m (6 ft 0 in)
- Position: Midfielder

Team information
- Current team: Nafta 1903
- Number: 18

Youth career
- 2003–2012: Maribor
- 2012–2013: Domžale

Senior career*
Years	Team	Apps	(Gls)
2012–2015	Domžale	14	(1)
2014–2015	→ Triglav Kranj (loan)	24	(1)
2015–2016	Zavrč	33	(3)
2016–2024	Maribor	165	(14)
2024–2025	Borac Banja Luka	9	(0)
2025–	Nafta 1903	50	(7)

International career
2009–2010	Slovenia U16	2	(0)
2010	Slovenia U17	7	(2)
2011–2012	Slovenia U18	13	(2)
2012	Slovenia U19	7	(0)
2015–2016	Slovenia U21	8	(0)
2016	Slovenia	1	(0)
- * Club domestic league appearances and goals as of 1 August 2026

Aleks Pihler (born 15 January 1994) is a Slovenian footballer who plays as a midfielder for Nafta 1903.

== International career ==
Pihler got his first call up to the Slovenia national team for the 2018 FIFA World Cup qualifiers against Slovakia and England in October 2016. He made his debut on 14 November 2016 in a friendly against Poland.

== Honours ==
Maribor

- Slovenian Championship: 2016–17, 2018–19, 2021–22
