= Marwan Kabha =

Israeli footballer (born 1991)

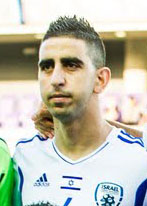
- Kabha with Israel Under-21 in 2013

Personal information
- Date of birth: 23 February 1991 (age 35)
- Place of birth: Ein as-Sahla, Israel
- Height: 1.81 m (5 ft 11 in)
- Position: Defensive midfielder

Team information
- Current team: Tzeirei Umm al-Fahm

Youth career
- Maccabi Petah Tikva

Senior career*
Years	Team	Apps	(Gls)
2009–2015	Maccabi Petah Tikva	122	(8)
2015–2018	Maribor	63	(2)
2018–2021	Hapoel Be'er Sheva	86	(4)
2021–2023	Bnei Sakhnin	49	(0)
2023–2024	Maccabi Bnei Reineh	11	(0)
2024	Maccabi Jaffa	16	(0)
2024–2025	Hapoel Umm al-Fahm	31	(0)
2025–2026	Maccabi Umm al-Fahm	9	(0)
2026–	Tzeiri Tmara	2	(0)

International career
2010–2013	Israel U21	14	(0)
2017	Israel	4	(0)
- * Club domestic league appearances and goals as of 15 June 2026

Marwan Kabha (Arabic: مروان كبها, Hebrew: מרואן קבהא; born 23 February 1991) is an Israeli professional footballer who plays a defensive midfielder for Liga Alef club Tzeirei Umm al-Fahm and the Israel national team.

== Early life ==
Kabha was born in Ein as-Sahla, Israel, to a Muslim-Arab family of Palestinian descent.

== Club career ==
In summer 2015, after playing six seasons with Israeli side Maccabi Petah Tikva, he moved abroad and signed a three-year contract with Slovenian side NK Maribor.

== International career ==
He was also part of the Israeli under-21 squad at the 2013 UEFA European Under-21 Championship.

== Honours ==
Maribor

- Slovenian Championship: 2016–17
- Slovenian Cup: 2015–16
