= Igor Poznič =

Slovenian footballer (1967–2025)

Personal information
- Date of birth: 13 August 1967
- Date of death: 1 January 2025 (aged 57)
- Position: Forward

Senior career*
Years	Team	Apps	(Gls)
1985–1993	Maribor	183	(61)
1993–1994	Grazer AK	3	(0)
1994	Mura	13	(6)
1995–1996	Maribor	37	(9)
1996	Felgueiras	6	(0)
1997–1998	Drava Ptuj		

International career
1993	Slovenia	1	(0)
- * Club domestic league appearances and goals

Igor Poznič (13 August 1967 – 1 January 2025) was a Slovenian professional footballer who played as a forward.

== Club career ==
During most of his career, Poznič played for Maribor, where he made 256 appearances and scored 88 goals, making him one of the most successful players in the club's history. He was also one of the most prolific scorers in the Slovenian PrvaLiga during the early 1990s, with a 50% scoring rate (51 goals in 102 league appearances).

== International career ==
In 1993, Poznič made one appearance for the Slovenia national team.

== Death ==
Poznič died on 1 January 2025, at the age of 57.
