= Gregor Bajde =

Slovenian footballer (born 1994)

Personal information
- Date of birth: 29 April 1994 (age 32)
- Place of birth: Slovenia
- Height: 1.86 m (6 ft 1 in)
- Positions: Winger; forward

Team information
- Current team: FC Großklein

Youth career
- 2001–2008: Kresnice
- 2008–2011: Bravo
- 2011–2012: Interblock

Senior career*
Years	Team	Apps	(Gls)
2011–2012	Interblock	18	(1)
2012–2015	Celje	78	(12)
2013	→ Bravo (loan)	1	(2)
2015–2021	Maribor	87	(22)
2016–2017	→ Novara (loan)	10	(0)
2021–2022	Bravo	30	(5)
2022–2024	Celje	49	(9)
2024–2025	Borac Banja Luka	5	(0)
2025–2026	Nafta 1903	19	(3)
2026–	FC Großklein	0	(0)

International career
2009–2010	Slovenia U16	3	(0)
2010	Slovenia U17	7	(2)
2011–2012	Slovenia U18	13	(3)
2012	Slovenia U19	6	(3)
2015–2016	Slovenia U21	10	(1)
- * Club domestic league appearances and goals as of 20 July 2026

Gregor Bajde (born 29 April 1994) is a Slovenian footballer who plays as a winger for FC Großklein.

== Honours ==
Maribor

- Slovenian Championship: 2016–17, 2018–19
- Slovenian Cup: 2015–16

Celje

- Slovenian Championship: 2023–24
