= Boris Binkovski =

German footballer (1944–2021)

Personal information
- Full name: Boris Edward Binkowski
- Date of birth: 25 November 1944
- Place of birth: Finow, Nazi Germany
- Date of death: 28 October 2021 (aged 76)
- Position: Winger

Senior career*
Years	Team	Apps	(Gls)
1961–1963	Triglav Kranj		
1963–1965	Kladivar		
1965–1973	Maribor	165	(29)
1972	→ Mura (loan)		
1973–1974	Wacker Innsbruck	6	(1)
1974–1975	LASK	19	(1)
1976	FC Antwerp	8	(0)
- * Club domestic league appearances and goals

Boris Binkovski (or Binkowski; 25 November 1944 – 28 October 2021) was a Yugoslav footballer who had spells at clubs in Austria and Belgium.

== Career ==
Born in Finow, East Germany, Binkovski was raised in Slovenia and played with local clubs Triglav Kranj and Kladivar in the Yugoslav third level before joining Maribor in 1965. Maribor was back then playing in the Yugoslav Second League and Binkovski was part of the generation that achieved promotion to the Yugoslav First League in 1967. He played with Maribor for almost a decade, with the exception of two half seasons when he was on loan at Mura in the Second League, in the second half of the 1971–72 season and the first half of 1972–73. He made 182 appearances and scored 30 goals in all competitions with Maribor.

In 1973, Binkovski moved to neighbouring Austria where he played a season with FC Wacker Innsbruck and then a season and a half with LASK Linz in the Austrian Bundesliga. During the winter break of 1975–76 he joined Royal Antwerp and played with them in the second half of the 1975–76 Belgian First Division. He stayed at Royal Antwerp at several functions within the club until 1992.

== Personal life ==
His son Peter was also a footballer, gaining 16 caps for Slovenia in the 1990s.

=== Death ===
Binkovski died in October 2021.
