= List of Slovenian football transfers summer 2025 =

This is a list of Slovenian football transfers for the 2025 summer transfer window. Only transfers featuring Slovenian PrvaLiga are listed.

== Slovenian PrvaLiga ==
Note: Flags indicate national team as has been defined under FIFA eligibility rules. Players may hold more than one non-FIFA nationality.

=== Olimpija Ljubljana ===
In:

No.	Pos.	Nation	Player
3	DF	SVN	Jošt Urbančič (from (Norway) Viking)
4	DF	BUL	Veljko Jelenković (from (Bulgaria) Slavia Sofia)
10	FW	MKD	Dimitar Mitrovski (from (Croatia) Varaždin)
27	DF	TOG	Frederic Ananou (from (Germany) Jahn Regensburg)
28	DF	POR	Diogo Almeida (from (Portugal) Feirense)
30	DF	SVN	Jan Gorenc (from (Belgium) Eupen)
52	GK	SVN	Matevž Dajčar (from (Italy) Atalanta U23)
80	MF	BEN	Mariano Ahouangbo (from (Tunisia) Soliman)

Out:

No.	Pos.	Nation	Player
2	DF	POR	Jorge Silva (free agent)
3	DF	POR	David Sualehe (to (Armenia) Noah)
8	DF	LTU	Justas Lasickas (to (Croatia) Rijeka)
10	FW	AUT	Raul Florucz (to (Belgium) Union Saint-Gilloise)
14	DF	SVN	Marcel Ratnik (to (United Arab Emirates) Al Ain)
21	DF	ESP	Manuel Pedreño (free agent)
22	GK	SVN	Denis Pintol (to Primorje)
—	FW	BIH	Admir Bristrić (on loan to Bravo, previously on loan at (Ukraine) Polissya Zhytomyr)
—	FW	SVN	Tihomir Maksimović (to Triglav Kranj, previously on loan at Slovan)

=== Maribor ===
In:

No.	Pos.	Nation	Player
3	DF	AUT	Čedomir Bumbić (from (Austria) First Vienna)
8	MF	GHA	Eric Taylor (from (Norway) Kongsvinger)
29	DF	SVN	Luka Guček (from (Ukraine) Vorskla Poltava)
30	FW	GHA	Benjamin Tetteh (from (France) Metz, previously on loan)
41	MF	FRA	Malamine Bamba (from (France) Martigues)
55	DF	SVN	Mark Španring (from Bravo)
70	MF	FRA	Isaac Tshipamba (from (France) Quevilly-Rouen)
98	GK	MAD	Téva Gardies (from (France) Châteaubriant)

Out:

No.	Pos.	Nation	Player
4	MF	SVN	Blaž Vrhovec (retired)
7	MF	HUN	György Komáromi (on loan to (Hungary) Debrecen)
8	MF	AUT	Marko Božić (to (Turkey) Erzurumspor)
14	DF	POR	André Sousa (to (Portugal) Paços de Ferreira)
16	MF	SVN	Niko Grlić (on loan to Bravo)
22	DF	SVN	Martin Milec (to Rače)
42	FW	FIN	Kai Meriluoto (loan return to (Finland) HJK)
70	MF	TUR	Bartuğ Elmaz (loan return to (Turkey) Fenerbahçe)
72	MF	SVN	Josip Iličić (to Koper)
81	GK	NED	Menno Bergsen (to (Netherlands) Helmond Sport)
—	MF	SVN	Lanej Bakšič (on loan to Dravinja)
—	FW	SVN	Marcos Tavares (on loan to Nafta, previously on loan at Bistrica)
—	DF	SVN	Luka Poredoš (to Nafta, previously on loan at Bistrica)
—	MF	SVN	Brin Horvat (to Beltinci, previously on loan at Bistrica)
—	MF	MKD	Behar Feta (to Aluminij, previously on loan at Domžale)
—	MF	SVN	Patrik Katič (to Triglav Kranj, previously on loan at Krka)

=== Koper ===
In:

No.	Pos.	Nation	Player
4	DF	FRA	Charles Divialle-Corbière (from (France) Metz B)
5	MF	CRO	Ivan Jelić Balta (from (Bosnia and Herzegovina) Sarajevo)
19	FW	CRO	Leo Rimac (from (Croatia) Dinamo Zagreb U19)
22	DF	BIH	Jasmin Čeliković (from (Russia) Akhmat Grozny, previously on loan at (Greece) Panetolikos)
26	DF	POL	Florian Hartherz (from (Poland) Miedź Legnica)
35	DF	NGA	Victor Ehibe (from (Nigeria) Shooting Stars)
59	MF	EST	Bogdan Vaštšuk (from (Kuwait) Al-Shabab)
69	DF	FRA	Brice Negouai (from (France) Villefranche)
72	MF	SVN	Josip Iličić (from Maribor)

Out:

No.	Pos.	Nation	Player
4	DF	SVN	Lan Vidmar (loan return to Maribor)
17	MF	CRO	Petar Petriško (on loan to Aluminij)
20	FW	NGA	Wisdom Sule (on loan to Aluminij)
26	MF	CRO	Gabriel Groznica (to (Kosovo) Ferizaj)
29	MF	CRO	Nikola Krajinović (free agent)
34	DF	SVN	Anel Zulić (loan return to (Denmark) Viborg)
35	MF	CRO	Di Mateo Lovrić (to (Bulgaria) Dobrudzha)
48	DF	FRA	Ahmed Sidibé (to (Italy) Venezia)
77	MF	SVN	Enej Jelenič (loan return to (Italy) Novara)
—	MF	FRA	Ilan Bacha (to (France) Chantilly, previously on loan at Dekani)
—	FW	SVN	Enej Marsetič (to Bistrica, previously on loan)

=== Celje ===
In:

No.	Pos.	Nation	Player
1	GK	SVN	Žan-Luk Leban (from (England) Everton)
4	MF	SVN	Darko Hrka (from Nafta)
5	DF	SVN	Gašper Vodeb (from Tabor Sežana)
9	FW	CRO	Franko Kovačević (from (Germany) Wehen Wiesbaden, previously on loan at (South Korea) Gangwon)
10	FW	SVN	Danijel Šturm (from Domžale)
11	MF	KOS	Milot Avdyli (from (Ukraine) Vorskla Poltava)
13	MF	NGA	Papa Daniel (from (Nigeria) Niger Tornadoes)
15	DF	ESP	David Castro (from (Spain) Racing Ferrol)
16	MF	CRO	Ivica Vidović (from Triglav Kranj)
17	MF	SVN	Andrej Kotnik (from (China) Dalian K'un City)
21	GK	CRO	Simon Sluga (from (Israel) Maccabi Tel Aviv)
42	DF	SVN	Matija Boben (from (Romania) CFR Cluj, previously on loan at (Romania) Politehnica Iași)
99	FW	SVN	Matej Poplatnik (from Bravo)

Out:

No.	Pos.	Nation	Player
4	MF	ROU	Marco Dulca (free agent)
5	MF	FRA	Clément Lhernault (free agent)
7	FW	SVN	Aljoša Matko (to (Hungary) Újpest)
10	MF	SVN	Nino Kouter (to Mura)
11	MF	SVN	Svit Sešlar (loan return to (Turkey) Eyüpspor)
21	DF	SVN	Nejc Ajhmajer (to Mura)
22	GK	SVN	Matjaž Rozman (to Aluminij)
25	DF	SVN	Matija Kavčič (on loan to (Poland) Stal Mielec)
35	FW	FRA	Logan Delaurier-Chaubet (loan return to (Netherlands) Almere City)
41	GK	POR	Ricardo Silva (to (Bahrain) Al-Khaldiya)
70	DF	FRO	Hanus Sørensen (on loan to Triglav Kranj)
81	DF	SVN	Klemen Nemanič (to (Slovakia) Dunajská Streda)
88	MF	SVN	Tamar Svetlin (to (Poland) Korona Kielce)
99	MF	ESP	Íñigo Eguaras (to (France) Dunkerque)
—	MF	SVN	Jošt Pišek (on loan to (Poland) Stal Mielec, previously on loan at Mura)
—	DF	SVN	Aljaž Krefl (free agent, previously on loan at Aluminij)
—	DF	CRO	Slavko Bralić (to (Bosnia and Herzegovina) Sarajevo, previously on loan at (Croatia) Gorica)
—	MF	SVN	Miha Sitar (to Ilirija, previously on loan at Rudar Velenje)
—	MF	SVN	Anel Islamagić (free agent, previously on loan at Slovan)

=== Bravo ===
In:

No.	Pos.	Nation	Player
9	FW	BIH	Admir Bristrić (on loan from Olimpija Ljubljana, previously on loan at (Ukraine) Polissya Zhytomyr)
79	MF	SVN	Niko Grlić (on loan from Maribor)

Out:

No.	Pos.	Nation	Player
5	DF	SVN	Mark Španring (to Maribor)
15	FW	SVN	Matej Poplatnik (to Celje)

=== Primorje ===
In:

No.	Pos.	Nation	Player
73	GK	SVN	Denis Pintol (from Olimpija Ljubljana)

Out:

No.	Pos.	Nation	Player

=== Mura ===
In:

No.	Pos.	Nation	Player
10	MF	SVN	Nino Kouter (from Celje)
22	DF	SVN	Nejc Ajhmajer (from Celje)

Out:

No.	Pos.	Nation	Player
7	MF	SVN	Jošt Pišek (loan return to Celje)

=== Radomlje ===
In:

No.	Pos.	Nation	Player

Out:

No.	Pos.	Nation	Player

=== Domžale ===
In:

No.	Pos.	Nation	Player

Out:

No.	Pos.	Nation	Player
7	FW	SVN	Danijel Šturm (to Celje)
21	MF	MKD	Behar Feta (loan return to Maribor)

=== Aluminij ===
In:

No.	Pos.	Nation	Player
11	MF	MKD	Behar Feta (from Maribor, previously on loan at Domžale)
19	FW	NGA	Wisdom Sule (on loan from Koper)
22	GK	SVN	Matjaž Rozman (from Celje)
77	MF	CRO	Petar Petriško (on loan from Koper)

Out:

No.	Pos.	Nation	Player
43	DF	SVN	Aljaž Krefl (loan return to Celje)

== See also ==
- 2025–26 Slovenian PrvaLiga
