= 2024–25 NK Celje season =

Celje
2024–25 season
- Manager: Albert Riera
- Stadium: Stadion Z'dežele
- Slovenian PrvaLiga: 4th
- Slovenian Football Cup: Winners
- UEFA Champions League: Second qualifying round
- UEFA Europa League: Third qualifying round
- UEFA Conference League: Quarter-finals
- Top goalscorer: League: Armandas Kučys (9); All: Armandas Kučys (17)

The 2024–25 season is the 106th year in the history of NK Celje and the 11th consecutive season in the top division. In addition to competing in the domestic league, Celje is also taking part in the Slovenian Football Cup and the UEFA Conference League. They were eliminated from both the Champions League and UEFA Europa League during the qualifying rounds.

== Transfers ==
=== Out ===
Pos.	Player	Transferred to	Fee	Date	Source
DF	(Slovenia) David Zec	(Germany) Holstein Kiel	Undisclosed	1 January 2025	

== Friendlies ==
=== Pre-season ===
19 June 2024 Friendly	Celje (Slovenia)	2–2	(Bosnia and Herzegovina) Borac Banja Luka	Zreče
18:00 UTC+2				Stadium: Zreški Stadion

25 June 2024 Friendly	Celje (Slovenia)	2–0	(Romania) Corvinul Hunedoara
17:30 UTC+2

28 June 2024 Friendly	Celje (Slovenia)	2–3	(Romania) Oțelul Galați	Kranjska Gora
11:00 UTC+2				Stadium: Športni Park Ruteč

28 June 2024 Friendly	Celje (Slovenia)	1–0	(Romania) Rapid București	Kranj
17:30 UTC+2				Stadium: Športnega Centra Kranj Pomožnem Terenu

=== Mid-season ===
18 January 2025 Friendly	Osijek (Croatia)	2–2	(Slovenia) Celje
11:30

25 January 2025 Friendly	Celje (Slovenia)	2–0	(Bosnia and Herzegovina) Široki Brijeg
11:30

== Competitions ==
=== Overall record ===
Competition	First match	Last match	Starting round	Final position	Record							
Competition	First match	Last match	Starting round	Final position	Pld	W	D	L	GF	GA	GD	Win %
Slovenian PrvaLiga	21 July 2024		Matchday 1		10	5	2	3	18	14	+4	50.00
Slovenian Football Cup	25 September 2024		Round of 32		1	1	0	0	3	0	+3	100.00
UEFA Champions League	10 July 2024	30 July 2024	First qualifying round	Second qualifying round	4	2	1	1	8	7	+1	50.00
UEFA Europa League	8 August 2024	15 August 2024	Third qualifying round	Third qualifying round	2	1	0	1	2	3	−1	50.00
UEFA Conference League	22 August 2024	17 April 2025	Play-off round	Quarter-finals	14	5	3	6	29	26	+3	35.71
Total					31	14	6	11	60	50	+10	45.16

Last updated: 28 September 2024
Source: Competitions

=== Slovenian PrvaLiga ===
==== League table ====
Pos	Team	Pld	W	D	L	GF	GA	GD	Pts	Qualification or relegation
2	Maribor	36	19	10	7	64	32	+32	67	Qualification for the Conference League second qualifying round
3	Koper	36	19	9	8	60	35	+25	66	Qualification for the Conference League first qualifying round
4	Celje	36	17	10	9	76	51	+25	61	Qualification for the Europa League first qualifying round (Note: Celje qualified for the Europa League first qualifying round by winning the 2024–25 Slovenian Football Cup.)
5	Bravo	36	14	13	9	52	44	+8	55	
6	Primorje	36	11	10	15	41	61	−20	43	

Source: PrvaLiga
Rules for classification: 1) Points; 2) Head-to-head points; 3) Head-to-head goal difference; 4) Head-to-head goals scored; 5) Goal difference; 6) Goals scored

==== Results summary ====
Overall								Home						Away					
Pld	W	D	L	GF	GA	GD	Pts	W	D	L	GF	GA	GD	W	D	L	GF	GA	GD
20	9	4	7	35	31	+4	31	6	1	4	21	19	+2	3	3	3	14	12	+2

Last updated: 8 February 2025.
Source: soccerway

==== Results by round ====
Round	1	2	3	4	5	6	7	8	9	10	11	12	13	14	15	16	17	18	19	20	21	22	23
Ground	H	H	A	H	A	H	A	H	A	A	A	H	A	H	A	H	A	H	H	H	A	H	A
Result	W	W	L	W	D	L	D	W	W	L	W	W	L	L	W	W	D	D	L	L			
Position	3	2	4	2	3	5	6	5	3	5	4	3	4	4	4	4	4	4	5	5			

Updated to match(es) played on 8 February 2025. Source:
A = Away; H = Home; W = Win; D = Draw; L = Loss

==== Matches ====
The match schedule was released on 27 June 2024.

21 July 2024 1	Celje	2–1	Bravo	Celje
20:15 UTC+2				Stadium: Stadion Z'dežele

3 August 2024 3	Mura	1–0	Celje	Murska Sobota
20:15 UTC+2				Stadium: Fazanerija City Stadium

11 August 2024 4	Celje	4–2	Radomlje	Celje
17:30 UTC+2				Stadium: Stadion Z'dežele

18 August 2024 5	Olimpija Ljubljana	2–2	Celje	Ljubljana
20:15 UTC+2				Stadium: Stožice Stadium

25 August 2024 6	Celje	0–3	Primorje	Celje
20:15 UTC+2				Stadium: Stadion Z'dežele

1 September 2024 7	Koper	0–0	Celje	Koper
20:15 UTC+2				Stadium: Bonifika Stadium

15 September 2024 8	Celje	3–1	Nafta 1903	Celje
17:30 UTC+2				Stadium: Stadion Z'dežele

18 September 2024 2	Celje	2–1	Maribor	Celje
				Stadium: Stadion Z'dežele

22 September 2024 9	Domžale	0–3	Celje	Domžale
20:15 UTC+2				Stadium: Domžale Sports Park

28 September 2024 10	Bravo	3–2	Celje	Ljubljana
17:30 UTC+2				Stadium: Stožice Stadium

6 October 2024 11	Maribor	1–2	Celje	Maribor
17:30 CET	Krajnc 3'; Širvys (yellow card) 17'; Repas (yellow card) 25' (yellow-red card) 59'; Repas (yellow card) 54'; Sikošek (yellow card) 89'	Report	Zec (yellow card) 50'; Kučys 61'; Edmilson 90+2' (yellow card) 90+2'	Stadium: Ljudski vrt Attendance: 6,000; Referee: (Slovenia) Rade Obrenović

19 October 2024 12	Celje	4–3	Mura	Celje
15:00 CET	Zec (yellow card) 43' (yellow-red card) 78'; Kvesić 63' (yellow card) 70'; Kučys 69'; Vuklišević 75'; Matko 80'	Report	Vizinger 8' 48'; Maroša 86' (pen.)	Stadium: Stadion Z'dežele; Attendance: 1,500; Referee: (Slovenia) Slavko Vinčić

27 October 2024 13	Radomlje	4–2	Celje	Domžale
17:30 CET	Stjepan Davidović 53'; Niko Gajzler 73'; Vucenovic 81'; Dobrovoljc (yellow card) 90+2'; Zukić 90+6'	Report	Kvesić 8'; Sešlar 65'; Matija Kavčič (yellow card) 75'; Matko (yellow card) 90+2'	Stadium: Domžale Sports Park; Attendance: 350; Referee: (Slovenia) Anže Jerič

3 November 2024 14	Celje	0–1	Olimpija Ljubljana	Celje
15:00 CET	Svetlin (yellow card) 77'	Report	David Sualehe (yellow card) 25'; Florucz 50' (yellow card) 75'; Doffo (yellow card) 77'; Thalisson (yellow card) 80'; Manuel Pedreño (yellow card) 90+2'	Stadium: Stadion Z'dežele; Attendance: 3,625; Referee: (Slovenia) Bojan Mertik

10 November 2024 15	Primorje	1–3	Celje	Nova Gorica
20:15 CET	Smajlagić 11' (pen.); Duan Ignjatović (yellow card) 90+2'	Report	Nemanič 55'; Kvesić 66'; Edmilson 74' (pen.); Zec (yellow card) 83'	Stadium: Nova Gorica Sports Park; Attendance: 200; Referee: (Slovenia) Martin Matoša

23 November 2024 16	Celje	1–0	Koper	Celje
15:00 CET	Brnić 15'; Nemanič (yellow card) 50'	Report	Di Mateo Lovrić (yellow card) 38'; Jurić (yellow card) 38'; Felipe Curcio (yellow card) 38'; Sidibé (yellow card) 74' (yellow-red card) 86'; Juric (yellow card) 81'; Pabai (yellow card) 90+3'	Stadium: Stadion Z'dežele; Attendance: 1,374; Referee: (Slovenia) Matej Jug

1 December 2024 17	Nafta	0–0	Celje	Lendava
15:00 CET	Darko Hrka (yellow card) 76'	Report	Sešlar (yellow card) 46'	Stadium: Lendava Sports Park; Attendance: 1,500; Referee: (Slovenia) David Šmajc

7 December 2024 18	Celje	2–2	Domžale	Celje
15:00 CET	Íñigo Eguaras (yellow card) 45+1'; Sešlar (red card) 62'; Brnić 78'; Kvesić 80'	Report	Šturm 8' 53'; Abraham Nwankwo (yellow card) 56'; Luka Kambič (yellow card) 90+1'	Stadium: Stadion Z'dežele; Attendance: 750; Referee: (Slovenia) Žan Jazbec

1 February 2025 19	Celje	2–3	Bravo	Celje
15:00 CET	Delaurier-Chaubet 23'; Brnić 46'; Edmilson (yellow card) 82'; Karničnik (yellow card) 85'	Report	Trdin 24'; Atemona 33'; Beno Selan (yellow card) 60'; Poplatnik 76'	Stadium: Stadion Z'dežele; Attendance: 1,250; Referee: (Slovenia) Slavko Vinčić

8 February 2025 20	Celje	1–2	Maribor	Celje
15:00 CET	Kučys 64'; Zabukovnik (yellow card) 90'	Report	Tetteh 23'; Elmaz (yellow card) 25' (goal) 52'; Repas (yellow card) 90+1'	Stadium: Stadion Z'dežele; Attendance: 2,850; Referee: (Slovenia) David Šmajc

16 February 2025 21	Mura	0–0	Celje	Murska Sobota
15:00 CET		Report		Stadium: Fazanerija City Stadium; Attendance: 1,490; Referee: (Slovenia) Dejan Balažič

23 February 2025 22	Celje	9–1	Radomlje	Celje
17:30 CET	Sešlar 7'; Prutsev 11' 21'; Kučys 16'; Tutyškinas 58' 78'; Edmilson 71'; Íñigo Eguaras 75'; Svetlin 90+2'	Report	Jaša Martinčič 31' (yellow card) 49'; Korun (yellow card) 65'	Stadium: Stadion Z'dežele; Attendance: 1,030; Referee: (Slovenia) Žan Jazbec

2 March 2025 23	Olimpija	2–0	Celje	Ljubljana
15:00 CET	Florucz 40'; Doffo (yellow card) 60'; Tamm 62'	Report	Juanjo Nieto (yellow card) 22'; Karničnik (yellow card) 34'	Stadium: Stožice Stadium; Attendance: 3,200; Referee: (Slovenia) Slavko Vinčić

9 March 2025 24	Celje	2–2	Primorje	Celje
17:30 CET	Kvesić 27'; Clément Lhernault (yellow card) 37'; Tutyškinas (yellow card) 66'; Kučys 90+3'	Report	Edvin Suljanović 55' (yellow card) 72'; Ishaq Rafiu 70'; Domagoj Babin (yellow card) 82'	Stadium: Stadion Z'dežele; Attendance: 1,020; Referee: (Slovenia) Dejan Balažič

16 March 2025 26	Celje	3–2	Nafta	Celje
20:15 CET	Prutsev 40'; Tutyškinas (yellow card) 62'; Kouter (yellow card) 78'; Zabukovnik 87'; Kučys 90+3'	Report	Zsombor Kálnoki-Kis 59'; Szabolcs Szalay 68'; Darko Hrka (yellow card) 79'	Stadium: Stadion Z'dežele; Attendance: 840; Referee: (Slovenia) Aleksandar Matković

29 March 2025 27	Domžale	0–1	Celje	Domžale
20:15 CET	Šturm (yellow card) 44'; Luka Kambič (yellow card) 57'; Lukas Hempt (yellow card) 90+3'	Report	Kvesić 11'	Stadium: Domžale Sports Park; Attendance: 250; Referee: (Slovenia) Alen Bubek

6 April 2025 28	Bravo	1–2	Celje	Ljubljana
17:30 CET	Baboula 25' (yellow card) 45+1'	Report	Kvesić (yellow card) 14'; Matko 32' 38'; Juanjo Nieto (yellow card) 39'; Zabukovnik (yellow card) 53'; Bejger (yellow card) 55'; Tutyškinas (yellow card) 73'; Edmilson (yellow card) 90+2'	Stadium: Stožice Stadium; Attendance: 250; Referee: (Slovenia) David Šmajc

13 April 2025 30	Celje	2–1	Mura	Celje
17:30 CET	Dulca (yellow card) 55'; Sešlar 72'; Iosifov (yellow card) 82'; Svetlin 90+5' (pen.)	Report	Antolin 5'; Sadriu (yellow card) 82'	Stadium: Stadion Z'dežele; Attendance: 1,364; Referee: (Slovenia) Slavko Vinčić

21 April 2025 31	Radomlje	1–3	Celje	Domžale
15:00 CET	Gordić 22'; Nino Vukasović (yellow card) 67'; Vokić (yellow card) 73'	Report	Juanjo Nieto (yellow card) 22'; Prutsev 48' (yellow card) 77'; Matko 79' 84'	Stadium: Domžale Sports Park; Attendance: 350; Referee: (Slovenia) Denis Šabanagič

27 April 2025 32	Celje	3–3	Olimpija	Celje
17:30 CET	Juanjo Nieto (yellow card) 38'; Kvesić (yellow card) 38'; Isosifov 43'; Svetlin (yellow card) 68'; Sešlar 70' (pen.); Matko 82' (yellow card) 83'; Prutsev (yellow card) 88' (yellow-red card) 90+2'	Report	Dino Kojić 6'; Durdov (yellow card) 38'; Doffo (yellow card) 38'; David Sualehe 58' (pen.) (yellow card) 64'; Florucz 90+5' (yellow card) 90+6'	Stadium: Stadion Z'dežele; Attendance: 3,270; Referee: (Slovenia) Mihael Antič

30 April 2025 25	Koper	1–1	Celje	Koper
18:45 CET	Felipe Curcio 76'; Kamil Manseri (yellow card) 82'; Maj Mittendorfer (yellow card) 86'	Report	Kvesić (yellow card) 23'; Matko (yellow card) 50'; Zabukovnik (yellow card) 65'; Sešlar (yellow card) 69'; Nemanič (yellow card) 75'; Svetlin 90'	Stadium: Bonifika Stadium; Attendance: 1,000; Referee: (Slovenia) David Šmajc

4 May 2025 33	Primorje	0–5	Celje	Ajdovščina
17:30 CET	Haris Kadrić (red card) 52'; Maj Fogec (yellow card) 61'	Report	Edmilson 5'; Prutsev 6' 43'; Sešlar 25'; Dulca (yellow card) 68'; Iosifov (yellow card) 83'; Tutyškinas 90+3'	Stadium: Ajdovščina Stadium; Attendance: 150; Referee: (Slovenia) Božo Kondić

=== Slovenian Football Cup ===
25 September 2024 Round of 64	Dravinja	0–3	Celje	Slovenske Konjice
15:30 UTC+2			Matko 13', 51'; Pišek 82'	Stadium: Štadion Dobrava; Referee: Gašper Lončar

30 October 2024 Round of 32	Hodoš	0–8	Celje	Hodoš
14:00 CET		Report	Edmilson 8' 75' 76'; Dulca 12'; Pišek 15' 69'; Bralić 44'; Nemanič 49'	Stadium: Nogometno igrišče Hodoš; Attendance: 350; Referee: (Slovenia) Blaž Bezjak

26 February 2025 Round of 16	Celje	3–2	Tabor Sežana	Celje
16:00 CET	Karničnik 17'; Nemanič 25'; Íñigo Eguaras (yellow card) 32' (goal) 57'; Matko (yellow card) 40'	Report	Mihael Briški 33' (pen.); Matevž Medič Slaček 81'; Kamal Bafounta (yellow card) 90+1'	Stadium: Stadion Z'dežele; Attendance: 730; Referee: (Slovenia) Darjan Kovačič

2 April 2025 Quarter-finals	Maribor	0–1	Celje	Maribor
19:00 CET	Soudani (yellow card) 86'	Report	Vuklišević (yellow card) 62'; Delaurier-Chaubet 83'; Nemanič (yellow card) 86'	Stadium: Ljudski vrt Attendance: 5,500; Referee: (Slovenia) Rade Obrenović

24 April 2025 Semi-finals	Celje	–	Olimpija	Celje
18:00 CET				Stadium: Stadion Z'dežele

=== UEFA Champions League ===
==== Qualifying ====
===== First qualifying round =====
10 July 2024 First leg	Flora (Estonia)	0–5	(Slovenia) Celje	Tallinn, Estonia
19:00 EEST (UTC+3)	Hussar (yellow card) 34'; Tõugjas (yellow card) 43'	Report	Matko 7', (penalty missed) 21'; Vuklišević 10'; Zabukovnik 45+1', (yellow card) 89'; Aarons 71'; Svetlin 90'	Stadium: Lilleküla Stadium; Attendance: 2,002; Referee: Alejandro Muñiz Ruiz (Spain); Assistant referees: Diego Sánchez Rojo (Spain), Fabian Blanco Rodríguez (Spain); Fourth official: Miguel Ángel Ortiz Arias (Spain)

16 July 2024 Second leg	Celje (Slovenia)	2–1 (7–1 agg.)	(Estonia) Flora	Celje, Slovenia
19:00 CEST (UTC+2)	Bobičanec (yellow card) 34'; Kouter (yellow card) 43'; Krefl (yellow card) 61'; Dulca (yellow card) 67'; Matko 73' (pen.); Karničnik 76'	Report	Varjund 12'	Stadium: Stadion Z'dežele; Attendance: 2,382; Referee: Goga Kikacheishvili (Georgia); Assistant referees: David Akhvlediani (Georgia), Davit Gabisonia (Georgia); Fourth official: Aleko Aptsiauri (Georgia)
Note: Celje won 7–1 on aggregate.

===== Second qualifying round =====
24 July 2024 First leg	Celje (Slovenia)	1–1	(Slovakia) Slovan Bratislava	Celje, Slovenia
20:15 CEST (UTC+2)	Bobičanec 7'; Kučys (yellow card) 56'; Karničnik (yellow card) 74'	Report	Takáč (yellow card) 4'; Strelec 11'; Savvidis (red card) 30'; Weiss (yellow card) 31'; Mak (yellow card) 45+2'	Stadium: Stadion Z'dežele; Attendance: 4,382; Referee: Darren England (England); Assistant referees: James Mainwaring (England), Nick Greenhalgh (England); Fourth official: Thomas Bramall (England)

30 July 2024 Second leg	Slovan Bratislava (Slovakia)	5–0 (6–1 agg.)	(Slovenia) Celje	Bratislava, Slovakia
20:30 CEST (UTC+2)	Tolić 17', (yellow card) 45'; Strelec 30', 72'; Mak 60'; Barseghyan 75'	Report	Vuklišević (red card) 16'; Dulca (yellow card) 90+2'	Stadium: Tehelné pole Attendance: 17,197; Referee: Fabio Maresca (Italy); Assistant referees: Daniele Bindoni (Italy), Marco Scatragli (Italy); Fourth official: Giovanni Ayroldi (Italy)
Note: Slovan Bratislava won 6–1 on aggregate.

=== UEFA Europa League ===
==== Qualifying ====
===== Third qualifying round =====
8 August 2024 First leg	Celje (Slovenia)	1–0	(Republic of Ireland) Shamrock Rovers	Celje, Slovenia
20:15 CEST (UTC+2)	Menalo 34'; Zec (yellow card) 75'; Aarons (yellow card) 84'	Report	Watts (yellow card) 30'; Honohan (yellow card) 65'; Pöhls (yellow card) 73'	Stadium: Stadion Z'dežele; Attendance: 2,478; Referee: Damian Sylwestrzak (Poland); Assistant referees: Paweł Sokolnicki (Poland), Bartosz Kaszyński (Poland); Fourth official: Marcin Kochanek (Poland)

15 August 2024 Second leg	Shamrock Rovers (Republic of Ireland)	3–1 (a.e.t.) (3–2 agg.)	(Slovenia) Celje	Tallaght, Republic of Ireland
20:00 IST (UTC+1)	Watts 37' (pen.); Farrugia 41', (yellow card) 72'; Greene (yellow card) 53'; Honohan (yellow card) 78'; Hoare (yellow card) 108'; Pöhls (yellow card) 120+1'	Report	Štubljar (yellow card) 36'; Vuklišević (yellow card) 52'; Karničnik 83', (yellow card) 87'; Kvesić (yellow card) 90+2'; Zec (yellow card) 105+1'	Stadium: Tallaght Stadium; Attendance: 6,153; Referee: Ovidiu Hațegan (Romania); Assistant referees: Mircea Mihail Grigoriu (Romania), Sebastian Gheorghe (Romania); Fourth official: Iulian Dima (Romania)
Note: Shamrock Rovers won 3–2 on aggregate.

=== UEFA Conference League ===
==== Play-off round ====
22 August 2024 First leg	Pyunik (Armenia)	1–0	(Slovenia) Celje	Yerevan, Armenia
20:00 AMT (UTC+4)	Otubanjo (yellow card) 45+2'; Buhari 59'; Vakulenko (yellow card) 90+3'	Report	Zec (yellow card) 41'; Pišek (yellow card) 72'	Stadium: Vazgen Sargsyan Republican Stadium; Attendance: 7,768; Referee: Luka Bilbija (Bosnia and Herzegovina); Assistant referees: Damir Lazić (Bosnia and Herzegovina), Aleksandar Smiljanić (Bosnia and Herzegovina); Fourth official: Dragan Petrović (Bosnia and Herzegovina)

29 August 2024 Second leg	Celje (Slovenia)	4–1 (4–2 agg.)	(Armenia) Pyunik	Celje, Slovenia
20:15 CEST (UTC+2)	Nemanič (yellow card) 13', (goal) 22'; Kvesić (yellow card) 23' (red card) 50'; Bobičanec 42' (pen.); Kučys 73', 85', (yellow card) 90+5'; Rozman (yellow card) 90+3'; Pišek (yellow card) 90+3'	Report	James (red card) 11'; Cociuc 63' (pen.); Bratkov (yellow card) 90+1'; Bravo (yellow card) 90+5'	Stadium: Stadion Z'dežele; Attendance: 2,837; Referee: Christian-Petru Ciochirca (Austria); Assistant referees: Maximilian Weiss (Austria), Michael Obritzberger (Austria); Fourth official: Alan Kijas (Austria)
Note: Celje 4–2 on aggregate.

==== League phase ====
Pos	Team	Pld	W	D	L	GF	GA	GD	Pts	Qualification
19	(Football Association of Iceland) Víkingur Reykjavík	6	2	2	2	7	8	−1	8	Advance to knockout phase play-offs (unseeded)
20	(Football Association of Bosnia and Herzegovina) Borac Banja Luka	6	2	2	2	4	7	−3	8	Advance to knockout phase play-offs (unseeded)
21	(Football Association of Slovenia) Celje	6	2	1	3	13	13	0	7	Advance to knockout phase play-offs (unseeded)
22	(Cyprus Football Association) Omonia	6	2	1	3	7	7	0	7	Advance to knockout phase play-offs (unseeded)
23	(Norwegian Football Federation) Molde	6	2	1	3	10	11	−1	7	Advance to knockout phase play-offs (unseeded)

Source: UEFA
Rules for classification: League phase tiebreakers

Round	1	2	3	4	5	6
Ground	A	H	A	H	A	H
Result	L	W	L	D	L	W

First match(es) will be played on ?. Source: UEFA
A = Away; H = Home; W = Win; D = Draw; L = Loss

2 October 2024 1	Vitória de Guimarães (Portugal)	3–1	(Slovenia) Celje	Guimarães, Portugal
15:30 UTC+1	Samu 7'; Gustavo Silva 36'; Tiago Silva 62'	Report	Matko 45'; Kučys (yellow card) 69'; Edmilson (yellow card) 87'	Stadium: Estádio D. Afonso Henriques; Attendance: 10,263; Referee: (Belgium) Lothar D'hondt

24 October 2024 2	Celje (Slovenia)	5–1	(Turkey) Başakşehir	Celje, Slovenia
18:45 UTC+2	Svetlin 5'; Brnić 30'; Sešlar 34'; Kučys (yellow card) 37' (goal) 51' 77'; Zec (yellow card) 81'	Report	Ba (yellow card) 24'; Özdemir (yellow card) 35'; Türüç (yellow card) 70'; Opoku (yellow card) 74'; Pelkas 75'; Davidson (yellow card) 81'	Stadium: Stadion Z'dežele; Attendance: 2,175; Referee: (Ukraine) Oleksiy Derevinskyi

7 November 2024 3	Real Betis (Spain)	2–1	(Slovenia) Celje	Seville, Spain
21:00 UTC+1	Natan 75'; Juanmi 90+4'	Report	Karničnik (yellow card) 35'; Kučys (yellow card) 49'; Juanjo Nieto (yellow card) 54' (goal) 81'; Lovro Štubljar (yellow card) 90+1'	Stadium: Estadio Benito Villamarín; Attendance: 37,618; Referee: (Serbia) Novak Simović

28 November 2024 4	Celje (Slovenia)	3–3	(Poland) Jagiellonia Białystok	Celje, Slovenia
18:45 UTC+2	Zec 7'; Juanjo Nieto (yellow card) 33' (goal) 53'; Nemanič (yellow card) 33'; Adrián Diéguez 80' (o.g.)	Report	Afimico Pululu 34'; Churlinov (yellow card) 39'; Jesús Imaz 70'; Hansen 77'; Nguiamba (yellow card) 86'	Stadium: Stadion Z'dežele; Attendance: 3,520; Referee: (Netherlands) Allard Lindhout

12 December 2024 5	Pafos (Cyprus)	2–0	(Slovenia) Celje	Limassol, Cyprus
22:00 UTC+2	Luckassen (yellow card) 23'; Pileas (yellow card) 36'; Dragomir 48'; Correia (yellow card) 28', (goal) 63'; Name (yellow card) 90+1'	Report	Svetlin (yellow card) 17'; Zabukovnik (penalty missed) 24	Stadium: Alphamega Stadium; Attendance: 2,051; Referee: (Poland) Paweł Raczkowski

19 December 2024 6	Celje (Slovenia)	3–2	(Wales) The New Saints	Celje, Slovenia
21:00 UTC+1	Edmilson 20', 43'; Nemanič (yellow card) 39'; Kouter (yellow card) 76'; Zec 79'	Report	Davies 19'; Daniels (yellow card) 29'; Holden 42'; Roberts (yellow card) 71'	Stadium: Stadion Z'dežele; Attendance: 2,640; Referee: (Switzerland) Lukas Fähndrich

==== Knockout phase ====
===== Knockout phase play-offs =====
The draw for the knockout phase play-offs was held on 20 December 2024.

13 February 2025 First leg	Celje (Slovenia)	2–2	(Cyprus) APOEL	Celje, Slovenia
18:45	Kučys 2', 59'	Report	Abagna 32'; Laifis 70'	Stadium: Stadion Z'dežele; Attendance: 4,050; Referee: (Ukraine) Mykola Balakin

20 February 2025 Second leg	APOEL (Cyprus)	0–2 (2–4 agg.)	(Slovenia) Celje	Nicosia, Cyprus
21:00 (22:00 UTC+2)		Report	Kučys 45+4'; Svetlin 51'	Stadium: GSP Stadium; Attendance: 9,108; Referee: (Scotland) John Beaton
Note: Celje 4–2 on aggregate.

===== Round of 16 =====
The draw for the round of 16 was held on 21 February 2025, 14:00 CET.

6 March 2025 First leg	Celje (Slovenia)	1–0	(Switzerland) Lugano	Celje, Slovenia
21:00	Svetlin 23'	Report		Stadium: Stadion Z'dežele; Attendance: 5,712; Referee: (Portugal) António Nobre

13 March 2025 Second leg	Lugano (Switzerland)	5–4 (a.e.t.) (5–5 agg.) (1–3 p)	(Slovenia) Celje	Thun, Switzerland (Note: Lugano played their home matches at Stockhorn Arena, Thun, instead of their regular stadium, Cornaredo Stadium, Lugano, due to renovation work.)
18:45	Mahmoud 21'; Koutsias 42', 80'; Dos Santos 44'; Doumbia 118'	Report	Sešlar 40'; Svetlin 68'; Kučys 90+5' (pen.); Nieto 97'	Stadium: Stockhorn Arena; Attendance: 1,853; Referee: (Latvia) Andris Treimanis
	Penalties
	Przybyłko (penalty missed); Steffen (penalty missed); Mai (penalty scored); Cimignani (penalty missed)		(penalty scored) Edmilson; (penalty scored) Sešlar; (penalty scored) Karničnik
Note: 5–5 on aggregate. Celje won 3–1 on penalties.

===== Quarter-finals =====
The draw for the quarter-finals was held on 21 February 2025, 14:00 CET.

10 April 2025 First leg	Celje (Slovenia)	1–2	(Italy) Fiorentina	Celje, Slovenia
21:00 CEST (UTC+2)	Vuklišević (yellow card) 55'; Delaurier-Chaubet 68' (pen.)	Report	Ranieri 27', (yellow card) 49'; Moreno (yellow card) 35'; Zaniolo (yellow card) 53'; Mandragora 62' (pen.); Dodô (yellow card) 87'; Parisi (yellow card) 90+6'	Stadium: Stadion Z'dežele; Attendance: 12,512; Referee: Felix Zwayer (Germany)

17 April 2025 Second leg	Fiorentina (Italy)	2–2 (4–3 agg.)	(Slovenia) Celje	Florence, Italy
18:45 CEST (UTC+2)	Mandragora 37', (yellow card) 61'; Folorunsho (yellow card) 55'; Kean 67'	Report	Matko 54'; Nemanič 65'; Vuklišević (yellow card) 90+5'	Stadium: Stadio Artemio Franchi; Attendance: 13,195; Referee: João Pinheiro (Portugal)
Note: Fiorentina 4–3 on aggregate.
