= Slovenia national football team results (2020–present) =

This is a list of international football games played by the Slovenia national football team from 2020 to present.

== Fixtures and results ==
Key

Win Draw Loss Fixtures

=== 2020 ===
3 September 2020–21 UEFA Nations League C	Slovenia	0–0	Greece	Ljubljana, Slovenia
20:45 UTC+2		Report		Stadium: Stožice Stadium; Attendance: 0 (Note: Due to the COVID-19 pandemic in Europe, all matches scheduled for September 2020 were played behind closed doors.); Referee: Bobby Madden (Scotland)

6 September 2020–21 UEFA Nations League C	Slovenia	1–0	Moldova	Ljubljana, Slovenia
18:00 UTC+2	Bohar 28'	Report		Stadium: Stožice Stadium; Attendance: 0 Referee: Jérôme Brisard (France)

7 October Friendly	Slovenia	4–0	San Marino	Ljubljana, Slovenia
20:45 UTC+2	Mitrović 17', 42'; Vučkić 25' (pen.); Rep 48'	Report		Stadium: Stožice Stadium; Attendance: 500; Referee: Sebastian Gishamer (Austria)

11 October 2020–21 UEFA Nations League C	Kosovo	0–1	Slovenia	Pristina, Kosovo
20:45 UTC+2		Report	Vučkić 22'	Stadium: Fadil Vokrri Stadium; Attendance: 0 Referee: Andrew Madley (England)

14 October 2020–21 UEFA Nations League C	Moldova	0–4	Slovenia	Chișinău, Moldova
21:45 UTC+3		Report	Lovrić 8'; Vučkić 37' (pen.), 42', 55' (pen.)	Stadium: Zimbru Stadium; Attendance: 0 Referee: João Pinheiro (Portugal)

11 November Friendly	Slovenia	0–0	Azerbaijan	Ljubljana, Slovenia
20:45 UTC+1		Report		Stadium: Stožice Stadium; Attendance: 0 Referee: Ferenc Karakó (Hungary)

15 November 2020–21 UEFA Nations League C	Slovenia	2–1	Kosovo	Ljubljana, Slovenia
20:45 UTC+1	Kurtić 63'; Iličić 90+4' (pen.)	Report	Muriqi 58'	Stadium: Stožice Stadium; Attendance: 0 Referee: Bartosz Frankowski (Poland)

18 November 2020–21 UEFA Nations League C	Greece	0–0	Slovenia	Athens, Greece
21:45 UTC+2		Report		Stadium: Georgios Kamaras Stadium; Attendance: 0 Referee: Carlos del Cerro Grande (Spain)

=== 2021 ===
24 March 2022 FIFA World Cup qualification	Slovenia	1–0	Croatia	Ljubljana, Slovenia
20:45 UTC+1	Lovrić 15'	Report		Stadium: Stožice Stadium; Attendance: 0 Referee: Antonio Mateu Lahoz (Spain)

27 March 2022 FIFA World Cup qualification	Russia	2–1	Slovenia	Sochi, Russia
17:00 UTC+3	Dzyuba 26', 35'	Report	Iličić 36'	Stadium: Fisht Stadium; Attendance: 13,008; Referee: Marco Di Bello (Italy)

30 March 2022 FIFA World Cup qualification	Cyprus	1–0	Slovenia	Nicosia, Cyprus
19:00 UTC+3	Pittas 42'	Report		Stadium: GSP Stadium; Attendance: 0 Referee: Andreas Ekberg (Sweden)

1 June Friendly	North Macedonia	1–1	Slovenia	Skopje, North Macedonia
18:00 UTC+2	Elmas 55'	Report	Črnigoj 90+7'	Stadium: National Arena Todor Proeski; Attendance: 10,000; Referee: Besfort Kasumi (Kosovo)

4 June Friendly	Slovenia	6–0	Gibraltar	Koper, Slovenia
20:45 UTC+2	Šporar 11', 34'; Iličić 17', 57'; Mlakar 38'; Stanković 61'	Report		Stadium: Bonifika; Attendance: 1,035; Referee: Haris Kaljanac (Bosnia and Herzegovina)

1 September 2022 FIFA World Cup qualification	Slovenia	1–1	Slovakia	Ljubljana, Slovenia
20:45 UTC+2	Stojanović 42'	Report	Boženík 32'	Stadium: Stožice Stadium; Attendance: 4,034; Referee: István Kovács (Romania)

4 September 2022 FIFA World Cup qualification	Slovenia	1–0	Malta	Ljubljana, Slovenia
18:00 UTC+2	Lovrić 45' (pen.)	Report		Stadium: Stožice Stadium; Attendance: 4,571; Referee: Andris Treimanis (Latvia)

7 September 2022 FIFA World Cup qualification	Croatia	3–0	Slovenia	Split, Croatia
20:45 UTC+2	Livaja 33'; Pašalić 66'; Vlašić 90+4'	Report		Stadium: Stadion Poljud; Attendance: 16,237; Referee: Clément Turpin (France)

8 October 2022 FIFA World Cup qualification	Malta	0–4	Slovenia	Ta' Qali, Malta
20:45 UTC+2		Report	Iličić 27', 60'; Šporar 49'; Šeško 67'	Stadium: National Stadium; Attendance: 3,967; Referee: Anastasios Sidiropoulos (Greece)

11 October 2022 FIFA World Cup qualification	Slovenia	1–2	Russia	Maribor, Slovenia
20:45 UTC+2	Iličić 40'	Report	Diveyev 28'; Dzhikiya 32'	Stadium: Ljudski vrt Attendance: 6,524; Referee: Artur Soares Dias (Portugal)

11 November 2022 FIFA World Cup qualification	Slovakia	2–2	Slovenia	Trnava, Slovakia
20:45 UTC+1	Duda 58' (pen.); Strelec 74'	Report	Zajc 18'; Mevlja 62'	Stadium: Anton Malatinský Stadium; Attendance: 2,726; Referee: Mattias Gestranius (Finland)

14 November 2022 FIFA World Cup qualification	Slovenia	2–1	Cyprus	Ljubljana, Slovenia
15:00 UTC+1	Zajc 48'; Gnezda Čerin 84'	Report	Kakoullis 89'	Stadium: Stožice Stadium; Attendance: 5,117; Referee: Sergey Ivanov (Russia)

=== 2022 ===
26 March Friendly	Croatia	1–1	Slovenia	Al Rayyan, Qatar
17:00 UTC+3	Kramarić 39'	Report	Bijol 90+1'	Stadium: Education City Stadium; Attendance: 3,000; Referee: Abdullah Jamali (Kuwait)

29 March Friendly	Qatar	0–0	Slovenia	Al Rayyan, Qatar
20:30 UTC+3		Report		Stadium: Education City Stadium; Referee: Youssef Essrayri (Tunisia)

2 June 2022–23 UEFA Nations League B	Slovenia	0–2	Sweden	Ljubljana, Slovenia
20:45 UTC+2		Report	Forsberg 39' (pen.); Kulusevski 88'	Stadium: Stožice Stadium; Attendance: 5,123; Referee: Ruddy Buquet (France)

5 June 2022–23 UEFA Nations League B	Serbia	4–1	Slovenia	Belgrade, Serbia
20:45 UTC+2	A. Mitrović 24'; Milinković-Savić 56'; Jović 85'; Radonjić 90+2'	Report	Stojanović 30'	Stadium: Rajko Mitić Stadium; Attendance: 10,925; Referee: Jesús Gil Manzano (Spain)

9 June 2022–23 UEFA Nations League B	Norway	0–0	Slovenia	Oslo, Norway
20:45 UTC+2		Report		Stadium: Ullevaal Stadion; Attendance: 18,134; Referee: Fábio Veríssimo (Portugal)

12 June 2022–23 UEFA Nations League B	Slovenia	2–2	Serbia	Ljubljana, Slovenia
20:45 UTC+2	Gnezda Čerin 48'; Šeško 53'	Report	Živković 8'; A. Mitrović 35'	Stadium: Stožice Stadium; Attendance: 13,782; Referee: Maurizio Mariani (Italy)

24 September 2022–23 UEFA Nations League B	Slovenia	2–1	Norway	Ljubljana, Slovenia
18:00 UTC+2	Šporar 69'; Šeško 81'	Report	Haaland 47'	Stadium: Stožice Stadium; Attendance: 14,824; Referee: Lawrence Visser (Belgium)

27 September 2022–23 UEFA Nations League B	Sweden	1–1	Slovenia	Solna, Sweden
20:45 UTC+2	Forsberg 42'	Report	Šeško 28'	Stadium: Friends Arena; Attendance: 22,895; Referee: Felix Zwayer (Germany)

17 November Friendly	Romania	1–2	Slovenia	Cluj-Napoca, Romania
18:30 UTC+2	Drăguș 64'	Report	Šeško 26'; Šporar 32'	Stadium: Cluj Arena; Attendance: 6,845; Referee: Nicolas Laforge (Belgium)

20 November Friendly	Slovenia	1–0	Montenegro	Ljubljana, Slovenia
15:00 UTC+1	Zajc 42'	Report		Stadium: Stožice Stadium; Attendance: 11,165; Referee: Christopher Jäger (Austria)

=== 2023 ===
23 March UEFA Euro 2024 qualifying	Kazakhstan	1–2	Slovenia	Astana, Kazakhstan
21:00 UTC+6	Samorodov 24'	Report	Brekalo 47'; Vipotnik 78'	Stadium: Astana Arena; Attendance: 27,122; Referee: Glenn Nyberg (Sweden)

26 March UEFA Euro 2024 qualifying	Slovenia	2–0	San Marino	Ljubljana, Slovenia
18:00 UTC+2	Šeško 56'; Di Maio 60' (o.g.)	Report		Stadium: Stožice Stadium; Attendance: 10,282; Referee: Nathan Verboomen (Belgium)

16 June UEFA Euro 2024 qualifying	Finland	2–0	Slovenia	Helsinki, Finland
19:00 UTC+3	Pohjanpalo 13'; Antman 64'	Report		Stadium: Helsinki Olympic Stadium; Attendance: 32,560; Referee: Guillermo Cuadra Fernández (Spain)

19 June UEFA Euro 2024 qualifying	Slovenia	1–1	Denmark	Ljubljana, Slovenia
20:45 UTC+2	Šporar 25'	Report	Højlund 42'	Stadium: Stožice Stadium; Attendance: 14,382; Referee: François Letexier (France)

7 September UEFA Euro 2024 qualifying	Slovenia	4–2	Northern Ireland	Ljubljana, Slovenia
20:45 UTC+2	Šporar 3', 56'; Evans 17' (o.g.); Šeško 42'	Report	Price 7'; Evans 53'	Stadium: Stožice Stadium; Attendance: 12,587; Referee: Marco Guida (Italy)

10 September UEFA Euro 2024 qualifying	San Marino	0–4	Slovenia	Serravalle, San Marino
20:45 UTC+2		Report	Vipotnik 4'; Mlakar 16'; Lovrić 61'; Karničnik 67'	Stadium: San Marino Stadium; Attendance: 844; Referee: Mykola Balakin (Ukraine)

14 October UEFA Euro 2024 qualifying	Slovenia	3–0	Finland	Ljubljana, Slovenia
18:00 UTC+2	Šeško 16' (pen.), 28'; Janža 90+2'	Report		Stadium: Stožice Stadium; Attendance: 15,823; Referee: Daniele Orsato (Italy)

17 October UEFA Euro 2024 qualifying	Northern Ireland	0–1	Slovenia	Belfast, Northern Ireland
19:45 UTC+1		Report	Gnezda Čerin 5'	Stadium: Windsor Park; Attendance: 16,332; Referee: István Kovács (Romania)

17 November UEFA Euro 2024 qualifying	Denmark	2–1	Slovenia	Copenhagen, Denmark
20:45 UTC+1	Mæhle 26'; Delaney 54'	Report	Janža 30'	Stadium: Parken Stadium; Attendance: 35,608; Referee: José María Sánchez Martínez (Spain)

20 November UEFA Euro 2024 qualifying	Slovenia	2–1	Kazakhstan	Ljubljana, Slovenia
20:45 UTC+1	Šeško 41' (pen.); Verbič 86'	Report	Orazov 48'	Stadium: Stožice Stadium; Attendance: 16,432; Referee: Szymon Marciniak (Poland)

=== 2024 ===
20 January Friendly	United States	0–1	Slovenia	San Antonio, United States
14:00 UTC−6		Report	Gradišar 26'	Stadium: Toyota Field; Attendance: 9,191; Referee: Pierre-Luc Lauzière (Canada)

21 March Friendly	Malta	2–2	Slovenia	Ta' Qali, Malta
19:00 UTC+1	Guillaumier 54'; Pisani 58'	Report	Šporar 28'; Šeško 81'	Stadium: National Stadium; Attendance: 1,652; Referee: Sandi Putros (Denmark)

26 March Friendly	Slovenia	2–0	Portugal	Ljubljana, Slovenia
20:45 UTC+1	Gnezda Čerin 72'; Elšnik 80'	Report		Stadium: Stožice Stadium; Attendance: 16,432; Referee: Irfan Peljto (Bosnia and Herzegovina)

4 June Friendly	Slovenia	2–1	Armenia	Ljubljana, Slovenia
18:00 UTC+2	Mlakar 11'; Iličić 63'	Report	Haroyan 56'	Stadium: Stožice Stadium; Attendance: 8,389; Referee: Andreas Argyrou (Cyprus)

8 June Friendly	Slovenia	1–1	Bulgaria	Ljubljana, Slovenia
15:00 UTC+2	Šporar 14'	Report	Despodov 4' (pen.)	Stadium: Stožice Stadium; Attendance: 11,037; Referee: Arda Kardeşler (Turkey)

16 June UEFA Euro 2024 Group C	Slovenia	1–1	Denmark	Stuttgart, Germany
18:00 UTC+2	Janža 77'	Report	Eriksen 17'	Stadium: MHPArena; Attendance: 54,000; Referee: Sandro Schärer (Switzerland)

20 June UEFA Euro 2024 Group C	Slovenia	1–1	Serbia	Munich, Germany
15:00 UTC+2	Karničnik 69'	Report	Jović 90+5'	Stadium: Allianz Arena; Attendance: 63,028; Referee: István Kovács (Romania)

25 June UEFA Euro 2024 Group C	England	0–0	Slovenia	Cologne, Germany
21:00 UTC+2		Report		Stadium: RheinEnergieStadion; Attendance: 41,536; Referee: Clément Turpin (France)

1 July UEFA Euro 2024 Round of 16	Portugal	0–0 (a.e.t.) (3–0 p)	Slovenia	Frankfurt, Germany
21:00 UTC+2		Report		Stadium: Waldstadion; Attendance: 46,576; Referee: Daniele Orsato (Italy)
	Penalties
	Ronaldo (penalty scored); Fernandes (penalty scored); B. Silva (penalty scored)		(penalty missed) Iličić; (penalty missed) Balkovec; (penalty missed) Verbič

6 September 2024–25 UEFA Nations League B	Slovenia	1–1	Austria	Ljubljana, Slovenia
20:45 UTC+2	Šeško 16' (pen.)	Report	Laimer 28'	Stadium: Stožice Stadium; Attendance: 14,834; Referee: Radu Petrescu (Romania)

9 September 2024–25 UEFA Nations League B	Slovenia	3–0	Kazakhstan	Ljubljana, Slovenia
20:45 UTC+2	Šeško 23', 28', 63'	Report		Stadium: Stožice Stadium; Attendance: 9,814; Referee: João Pinheiro (Portugal)

10 October 2024–25 UEFA Nations League B	Norway	3–0	Slovenia	Oslo, Norway
20:45 UTC+2	Haaland 7', 62'; Sørloth 52'	Report		Stadium: Ullevaal Stadion; Attendance: 23,341; Referee: Manfredas Lukjančukas (Lithuania)

13 October 2024–25 UEFA Nations League B	Kazakhstan	0–1	Slovenia	Almaty, Kazakhstan
18:00 UTC+5		Report	Mlakar 55'	Stadium: Almaty Central Stadium; Attendance: 19,783; Referee: Craig Pawson (England)

14 November 2024–25 UEFA Nations League B	Slovenia	1–4	Norway	Ljubljana, Slovenia
20:45 UTC+1	Šeško 21' (pen.)	Report	Nusa 4', 59'; Haaland 45'; Hauge 82'	Stadium: Stožice Stadium; Attendance: 15,308; Referee: Michael Oliver (England)

17 November 2024–25 UEFA Nations League B	Austria	1–1	Slovenia	Vienna, Austria
18:00 UTC+1	Schmid 27'	Report	Gnezda Čerin 81'	Stadium: Ernst-Happel-Stadion; Attendance: 46,000; Referee: Glenn Nyberg (Sweden)

=== 2025 ===
20 March 2024–25 UEFA Nations League promotion/relegation play-offs	Slovakia	0–0	Slovenia	Bratislava, Slovakia
20:45 UTC+1		Report		Stadium: Tehelné pole Attendance: 12,545; Referee: Maurizio Mariani (Italy)

23 March 2024–25 UEFA Nations League promotion/relegation play-offs	Slovenia	1–0 (a.e.t.)	Slovakia	Ljubljana, Slovenia
18:00 UTC+1	Gnezda Čerin 95'	Report		Stadium: Stožice Stadium; Attendance: 14,076; Referee: István Kovács (Romania)

6 June Friendly	Luxembourg	0–1	Slovenia	Luxembourg City, Luxembourg
19:00 UTC+2		Report	Svetlin 44'	Stadium: Stade de Luxembourg; Attendance: 7,508; Referee: Matthew De Gabriele (Malta)

10 June Friendly	Slovenia	2–1	Bosnia and Herzegovina	Celje, Slovenia
18:00 UTC+2	Verbič 63'; Vombergar 89' (pen.)	Report	Muharemović 90+4'	Stadium: Stadion Z'dežele; Attendance: 12,073; Referee: Nikola Dabanović (Montenegro)

5 September 2026 FIFA World Cup qualification	Slovenia	2–2	Sweden	Ljubljana, Slovenia
20:45 UTC+2	Lovrić 46'; Vipotnik 90'	Report	Elanga 18'; Ayari 73'	Stadium: Stožice Stadium; Attendance: 15,679; Referee: José María Sánchez Martínez (Spain)

8 September 2026 FIFA World Cup qualification	Switzerland	3–0	Slovenia	Basel, Switzerland
20:45 UTC+2	Elvedi 18'; Embolo 33'; Ndoye 38'	Report		Stadium: St. Jakob-Park; Attendance: 12,757; Referee: François Letexier (France)

10 October 2026 FIFA World Cup qualification	Kosovo	0–0	Slovenia	Pristina, Kosovo
20:45 UTC+2		Report		Stadium: Fadil Vokrri Stadium; Attendance: 12,268; Referee: Marco Guida (Italy)

13 October 2026 FIFA World Cup qualification	Slovenia	0–0	Switzerland	Ljubljana, Slovenia
20:45 UTC+2		Report		Stadium: Stožice Stadium; Attendance: 14,637; Referee: Felix Zwayer (Germany)

15 November 2026 FIFA World Cup qualification	Slovenia	0–2	Kosovo	Ljubljana, Slovenia
20:45 UTC+1		Report	Asllani 6'; Karničnik 64' (o.g.)	Stadium: Stožice Stadium; Attendance: 15,382; Referee: Clément Turpin (France)

18 November 2026 FIFA World Cup qualification	Sweden	1–1	Slovenia	Solna, Sweden
20:45 UTC+1	Lundgren 87'	Report	Elšnik 64'	Stadium: Strawberry Arena; Attendance: 25,724; Referee: Maurizio Mariani (Italy)

=== 2026 ===
28 March Friendly	Hungary	1–0	Slovenia	Budapest, Hungary
18:00 UTC+1	Schön 79'	Report		Stadium: Puskás Aréna; Attendance: 50,252; Referee: Rohit Saggi (Norway)

31 March Friendly	Montenegro	2–3	Slovenia	Podgorica, Montenegro
18:00 UTC+2	Osmajić 20', 44'	Report	Vipotnik 41', 55'; Šturm 47'	Stadium: Podgorica City Stadium; Attendance: 3,000; Referee: Duje Strukan (Croatia)

4 June Friendly	Slovenia	1–1	Cyprus	Ljubljana, Slovenia
18:00 UTC+2	Drkušić 65'	Report	Tzionis 7'	Stadium: Stožice Stadium; Attendance: 9,023; Referee: Patrik Kolarić (Croatia)

7 June Friendly	Croatia	2–1	Slovenia	Varaždin, Croatia
20:45 UTC+2	Modrić 51'; Pašalić 90+3'	Report	Šporar 83'	Stadium: Stadion Varteks; Attendance: 7,032; Referee: Bence Csonka (Hungary)

26 September 2026–27 UEFA Nations League B	Slovenia	0–0	Scotland	Ljubljana, Slovenia
15:00 UTC+2		Report		Stadium: Stožice Stadium; Attendance: 12,182; Referee: Horațiu Feșnic (Romania)

29 September 2026–27 UEFA Nations League B	Slovenia	2–0	North Macedonia	Ljubljana, Slovenia
20:45 UTC+2	Lovrić 55'; Matko 82'	Report		Stadium: Stožice Stadium; Attendance: 10,246; Referee: Andrea Colombo (Italy)

3 October 2026–27 UEFA Nations League B	Switzerland	2–1	Slovenia	Lucerne, Switzerland
20:45 UTC+2	Janža 10' (o.g.); Ndoye 38'	Report	Vipotnik 2'	Stadium: Thermoplan Arena; Attendance: 15,240; Referee: Ivan Kružliak (Slovakia)

6 October 2026–27 UEFA Nations League B	Scotland	1–2	Slovenia	Glasgow, Scotland
19:45 UTC+1	Christie 31'	Report	Matko 56'; Šturm 71'	Stadium: Hampden Park; Attendance: 34,466; Referee: José María Sánchez Martínez (Spain)

13 November 2026–27 UEFA Nations League B	Slovenia	0–0	Switzerland	Maribor, Slovenia
20:45 UTC+1		Report		Stadium: Ljudski vrt Attendance: 10,500; Referee: Jasper Vergoote (Belgium)

16 November 2026–27 UEFA Nations League B	North Macedonia	0–3	Slovenia	Skopje, North Macedonia
20:45 UTC+1		Report	Šturm 29', 90+1'; Zec 66'	Stadium: Toše Proeski Arena; Attendance: 1,875; Referee: Serdar Gözübüyük (Netherlands)

=== 2027 ===
27 March 2026–27 UEFA Nations League promotion/relegation play-offs	Slovenia	v	Wales	Slovenia
20:45 UTC+1

30 March 2026–27 UEFA Nations League promotion/relegation play-offs	Wales	v	Slovenia	Wales
19:45 UTC+1
