= Mario Kvesić =

Bosnian footballer (born 1992)

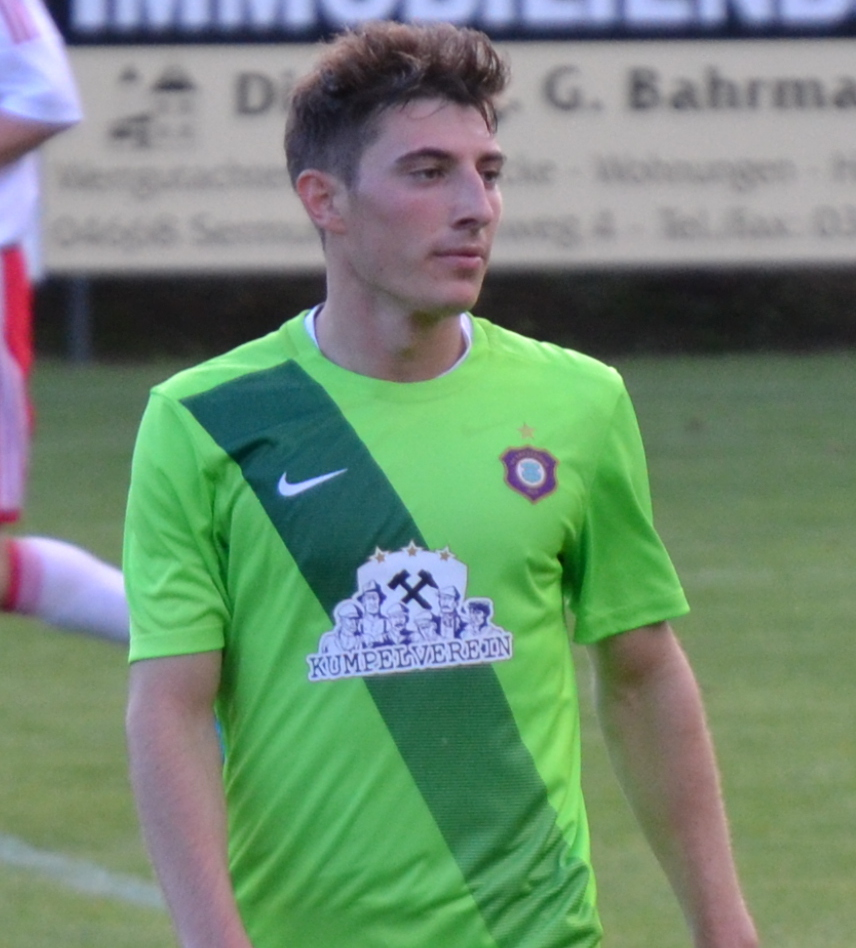
- Kvesić playing for Erzgebirge Aue in 2016

Personal information
- Date of birth: 12 January 1992 (age 34)
- Place of birth: Široki Brijeg, SFR Yugoslavia
- Height: 1.75 m (5 ft 9 in)
- Position: Midfielder

Team information
- Current team: Celje
- Number: 8

Youth career
- Široki Brijeg

Senior career*
Years	Team	Apps	(Gls)
2011–2012	Široki Brijeg	24	(3)
2012–2015	RNK Split	62	(6)
2015–2019	Erzgebirge Aue	90	(12)
2019–2020	1. FC Magdeburg	20	(1)
2020–2021	Olimpija Ljubljana	8	(1)
2021	Pohang Steelers	26	(2)
2022–2023	Olimpija Ljubljana	52	(20)
2023–	Celje	50	(10)

International career
- Bosnia Herzegovina U17
2010	Bosnia Herzegovina U19 (Note: Official UEFA competitive matches only)	2	(0)
2011–2013	Bosnia Herzegovina U21	7	(2)
- * Club domestic league appearances and goals as of 25 May 2025

Mario Kvesić (born 12 January 1992) is a Bosnian professional footballer who plays as a midfielder for Slovenian PrvaLiga club Celje.

== Career statistics ==
As of match played 25 May 2025

Appearances and goals by club, season and competition
Club	Season	League			National cup (Note: Includes Bosnian Cup, Croatian Cup, DFB-Pokal, Korean FA Cup, Slovenian Cup)		Continental		Other		Total	
Club	Season	Division	Apps	Goals	Apps	Goals	Apps	Goals	Apps	Goals	Apps	Goals
Široki Brijeg	2010–11	Premier League of Bosnia and Herzegovina	4	0	0	0	—		0	0	4	0
Široki Brijeg	2011–12	Premier League of Bosnia and Herzegovina	20	3	5	1	—		0	0	25	4
Široki Brijeg	Total		24	3	5	1	—		0	0	29	4
RNK Split	2012–13	Prva HNL	11	1	2	0	—		—		13	1
RNK Split	2013–14	Prva HNL	25	3	0	0	—		—		25	3
RNK Split	2014–15	Prva HNL	26	2	5	0	3 (Note: Appearances in UEFA Europa League)	0	—		34	2
RNK Split	Total		62	6	7	0	3	0	—		72	6
Erzgebirge Aue	2015–16	3. Liga	31	4	2	0	—		—		33	4
Erzgebirge Aue	2016–17	2. Bundesliga	28	4	1	0	—		—		29	4
Erzgebirge Aue	2017–18	2. Bundesliga	19	3	0	0	—		2 (Note: Appearances in 2. Bundesliga relegation play-offs)	0	21	3
Erzgebirge Aue	2018–19	2. Bundesliga	12	1	0	0	—		—		12	1
Erzgebirge Aue	Total		90	12	3	0	—		2	0	95	12
1. FC Magdeburg	2019–20	3. Liga	20	1	1	0	—		—		21	1
Olimpija Ljubljana	2020–21	Slovenian PrvaLiga	8	1	—		—		—		8	1
Pohang Steelers	2021	K League 1	26	2	2	1	6 (Note: Appearances in AFC Champions League)	0	—		34	3
Olimpija Ljubljana	2021–22	Slovenian PrvaLiga	17	8	—		—		—		17	8
Olimpija Ljubljana	2022–23	Slovenian PrvaLiga	35	12	4	0	4 (Note: Appearances in UEFA Conference League)	1	—		43	13
Olimpija Ljubljana	Total		52	20	4	0	4	1	—		60	21
Celje	2023–24	Slovenian PrvaLiga	16	2	0	0	2	0	—		18	2
Celje	2024–25	Slovenian PrvaLiga	34	8	5	0	18 (Note: Four appearances in UEFA Champions League, two appearances in UEFA Europa League, twelve appearances in UEFA Conference League)	0	—		57	8
Celje	Total		50	10	5	0	20	0	—		75	10
Career total			332	55	27	2	33	1	2	0	394	58

== Honours ==
Olimpija

- Slovenian PrvaLiga: 2022-23
- Slovenian Football Cup: 2022-23

Celje

- Slovenian PrvaLiga: 2023-24, 2025–26
- Slovenian Football Cup: 2024-25
