= Žan Karničnik =

Slovenian footballer (born 1994)

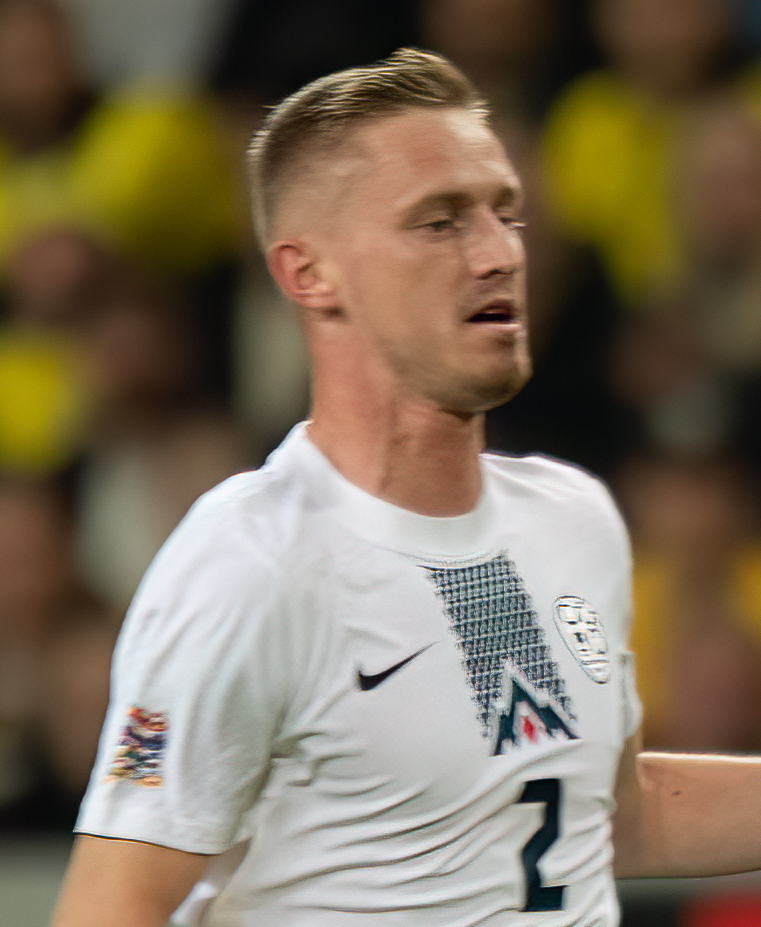
- Karničnik with Slovenia in 2022

Personal information
- Date of birth: 18 September 1994 (age 32)
- Place of birth: Slovenj Gradec, Slovenia
- Height: 1.84 m (6 ft 0 in)
- Position: Right-back

Team information
- Current team: Maribor
- Number: 23

Youth career
- –2013: Dravograd

Senior career*
Years	Team	Apps	(Gls)
2013–2015	Radlje ob Dravi	51	(10)
2015–2017	Maribor	1	(0)
2015–2017	Maribor B	50	(11)
2017–2022	Mura	146	(14)
2022–2023	Ludogorets Razgrad	16	(0)
2022	Ludogorets Razgrad II	4	(0)
2023	→ Celje (loan)	34	(2)
2024–2026	Celje	64	(3)
2026–	Maribor	13	(2)

International career^{‡}
2021–	Slovenia	54	(2)
- * Club domestic league appearances and goals as of 22 November 2026 ‡ National team caps and goals as of 16 November 2026

Žan Karničnik (born 18 September 1994) is a Slovenian professional footballer who plays as a right-back for Slovenian PrvaLiga club Maribor and the Slovenia national team.

== Club career ==
Karničnik played for the youth teams of Slovenian club Dravograd before moving to the Styrian League side Radlje ob Dravi in 2013 to start his senior career. Before the start of the 2015–16 season, he signed with PrvaLiga club Maribor, where he was part of their reserve side, Maribor B, playing in the Slovenian third division. After being a regular starter for Maribor B for two seasons, he made his first and only appearance for Maribor's first team in May 2017, starting in a 3–1 loss against Aluminij.

On 26 July 2017, Karničnik joined Slovenian Second League club Mura. At the end of his first season at Mura, the club won the league and was thus promoted to the PrvaLiga. In the 2020–21 season, Karničnik made 34 appearances as he won the PrvaLiga title with Mura, the first domestic league title in the club's history.

In January 2022, Karničnik moved to Bulgarian champions Ludogorets Razgrad. With Ludogorets, he won the national title in the 2021–22 season, making eleven league appearances in the second part of the season. He was set to leave Ludogorets in the summer of 2022 due to a lack of playing time and was on the verge of signing for Norwegian side Lillestrøm SK, but the transfer was cancelled as the paperwork was sent too late after the transfer window had already closed. After only five games played in the first part of the 2022–23 season, he returned to Slovenia in December 2022 and joined Celje on a one-year loan. After a successful loan spell, Karničnik joined Celje on a permanent basis in January 2024. With the club, he won the Slovenian First League in the 2023–24 season, appearing in 34 league games and scoring four goals.

== International career ==
Karničnik made his debut for the Slovenia national team on 8 October 2021 in a World Cup qualifier against Malta.

In June 2024, he was called up to the squad for UEFA Euro 2024 by Slovenian coach Matjaž Kek. He played the full 90 minutes in all four Slovenia matches at the tournament, and also scored in the 1–1 group stage draw against Serbia.

== Career statistics ==
=== Club ===
As of match played 22 May 2026

Appearances and goals by club, season and competition
Club	Season	League			National cup (Note: Includes Slovenian Cup, Bulgarian Cup)		Continental		Total	
Club	Season	Division	Apps	Goals	Apps	Goals	Apps	Goals	Apps	Goals
Radlje ob Dravi	2013–14	Styrian League	26	1	—		—		26	1
Radlje ob Dravi	2014–15	Slovenian Third League	25	9	—		—		25	9
Radlje ob Dravi	Total		51	10	0	0	0	0	51	10
Maribor B	2015–16	Slovenian Third League	25	4	—		—		25	4
Maribor B	2016–17	Slovenian Third League	25	7	—		—		25	7
Maribor B	Total		50	11	0	0	0	0	50	11
Maribor	2016–17	Slovenian PrvaLiga	1	0	—		—		1	0
Mura	2017–18	Slovenian Second League	25	4	4	1	—		29	5
Mura	2018–19	Slovenian PrvaLiga	35	2	5	1	—		40	3
Mura	2019–20	Slovenian PrvaLiga	33	3	5	1	1 (Note: Appearances in UEFA Europa League)	0	39	4
Mura	2020–21	Slovenian PrvaLiga	34	3	1	0	3	0	38	3
Mura	2021–22	Slovenian PrvaLiga	19	2	1	0	14 (Note: Four appearances in UEFA Champions League, four appearances in UEFA Europa League, six appearances in UEFA Europa Conference League)	0	34	2
Mura	Total		146	14	16	3	18	0	180	17
Ludogorets	2021–22	First League	11	0	3	0	0	0	14	0
Ludogorets	2022–23	First League	5	0	0	0	4 (Note: Three appearances in UEFA Champions League, one appearance in UEFA Europa League)	0	9	0
Ludogorets	Total		16	0	3	0	4	0	23	0
Ludogorets II	2022–23	Second League	4	0	—		—		4	0
Celje	2022–23	Slovenian PrvaLiga	16	0	2	0	—		18	0
Celje	2023–24	Slovenian PrvaLiga	34	4	0	0	6 (Note: Appearances in UEFA Europa Conference League)	0	40	4
Celje	2024–25	Slovenian PrvaLiga	22	0	4	1	16 (Note: Three appearances and one goal in UEFA Champions League, one appearance and one goal in UEFA Europa League, twelve appearances in UEFA Conference League)	2	42	3
Celje	2025–26	Slovenian PrvaLiga	26	1	1	0	14 (Note: Four appearances in UEFA Europa League, ten appearances and two goals in UEFA Conference League)	2	41	3
Celje	Total		98	5	7	1	36	4	141	10
Career total			366	40	26	4	58	4	450	48

=== International ===
As of match played 16 November 2026

Appearances and goals by national team and year
National team	Year	Apps	Goals
Slovenia	2021	4	0
Slovenia	2022	10	0
Slovenia	2023	10	1
Slovenia	2024	10	1
Slovenia	2025	10	0
Slovenia	2026	10	0
Total		54	2

Scores and results list Slovenia's goal tally first, score column indicates score after each Karničnik goal.

List of international goals scored by Žan Karničnik
No.	Date	Venue	Cap	Opponent	Score	Result	Competition
1	10 September 2023	San Marino Stadium, Serravalle, San Marino	20	San Marino	4–0	4–0	UEFA Euro 2024 qualifying
2	20 June 2024	Allianz Arena, Munich, Germany	30	Serbia	1–0	1–1	UEFA Euro 2024

== Honours ==
Maribor

- Slovenian First League: 2016–17

Mura

- Slovenian First League: 2020–21
- Slovenian Second League: 2017–18
- Slovenian Cup: 2019–20

Ludogorets Razgrad

- Bulgarian First League: 2021–22
- Bulgarian Supercup: 2022

Celje

- Slovenian First League: 2023–24, 2025–26
- Slovenian Cup: 2024–25

Individual

- Slovenian First League Player of the Year: 2023–24
- Slovenian First League Team of the Season: 2023–24, 2024–25, 2025–26
- Slovenian First League Player of the Month: October 2023, September 2026
