= Artemijus Tutyškinas =

Lithuanian footballer

Personal information
- Date of birth: 8 August 2003 (age 23)
- Place of birth: Vilnius, Lithuania
- Height: 1.89 m (6 ft 2 in)
- Position: Defender

Team information
- Current team: Celje
- Number: 6

Youth career
- 2013–2021: Escola Varsovia

Senior career*
Years	Team	Apps	(Gls)
2021	Escola Varsovia	4	(2)
2021–2023	Crotone	0	(0)
2022–2023	→ ŁKS Łódź (loan)	14	(0)
2022–2023	→ ŁKS Łódź II (loan)	4	(0)
2023–2025	ŁKS Łódź	19	(1)
2023–2024	ŁKS Łódź II	9	(0)
2025–	Celje	47	(7)

International career^{‡}
2018–2019	Lithuania U17	10	(0)
2021	Lithuania U19	5	(0)
2021–2023	Lithuania U21	5	(1)
2021–	Lithuania	28	(0)
- * Club domestic league appearances and goals as of 16:20, 27 September 2026 (UTC) ‡ National team caps and goals as of 20:05, 16 November 2026 (UTC)

Artemijus Tutyškinas (born 8 August 2003) is a Lithuanian professional footballer who plays as a defender for Slovenian club Celje and the Lithuania national team.

== International career ==
Tutyškinas made his international debut for Lithuania on the 8 September 2021, replacing Linas Klimavičius during the 5–0 away defeat against Italy, the European reigning champions. Aged only 18 years and one month at the time, he became the youngest ever Lithuania international to play in an official game.

== Career statistics ==
=== International ===
As of match played 18 November 2026

Appearances and goals by national team and year
National team	Year	Apps	Goals
Lithuania
Lithuania	2021	2	0
Lithuania	2022	2	0
Lithuania	2023	2	0
Lithuania	2024	7	0
Lithuania	2025	8	0
Lithuania	2026	7	0
Total		28	0

== Honours ==
ŁKS Łódź

- I liga: 2022–23

ŁKS Łódź II

- III liga, group I: 2022–23

Celje

- Slovenian PrvaLiga: 2025–26
- Slovenian Cup: 2024–25
