= Dulca =

Dulca is a Romanian surname. Notable people with the surname include:

- Cristian Dulca (born 1972), Romanian footballer and coach
- Marco Dulca (born 1999), Romanian footballer
