= Victor Gidado =

Nigerian footballer (born 2004)

Personal information
- Full name: Victor Ntino-Emo Gidado
- Date of birth: 14 April 2004 (age 22)
- Place of birth: Karu, Nigeria
- Height: 1.78 m (5 ft 10 in)
- Position: Attacking midfielder

Team information
- Current team: Gaziantep
- Number: 8

Youth career
- KSM Sport FA

Senior career*
| Years | Team | Apps | (Gls) |
| 2023–2026 | NK Bravo | 63 | (5) |
| 2026– | Gaziantep | 21 | (0) |
- * Club domestic league appearances and goals as of 6 November 2026

Victor Ntino-Emo Gidado (born 14 April 2004) is a Nigerian professional footballer who plays as an attacking midfielder for Süper Lig club Gaziantep.

== Club career ==
Gidado is a product of the Nigerian academy KSM Sport FA. He moved to Slovenian PrvaLiga club NK Bravo in 2023. On 10 January 2026, he transferred to Süper Lig club Gaziantep on a 3.5 year contract.
