= Nikita Iosifov =

Russian footballer

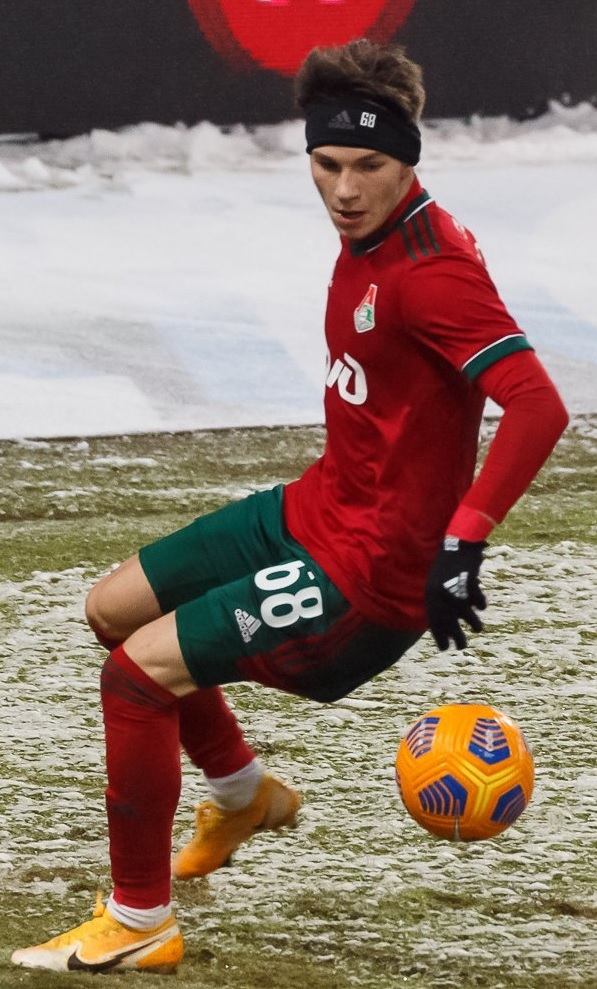
- Iosifov with Lokomotiv in 2021

Personal information
- Full name: Nikita Igorevich Iosifov
- Date of birth: 11 April 2001 (age 25)
- Place of birth: Michurinsk, Tambov Oblast, Russia
- Height: 1.75 m (5 ft 9 in)
- Position: Winger

Team information
- Current team: Sporting Gijón
- Number: 20

Youth career
- 2013–2018: Spartak Moscow
- 2018–2019: Lokomotiv Moscow

Senior career*
| Years | Team | Apps | (Gls) |
| 2019–2020 | Kazanka Moscow | 15 | (2) |
| 2020–2021 | Lokomotiv Moscow | 4 | (0) |
| 2021–2023 | Villarreal B | 41 | (6) |
| 2021–2023 | Villarreal | 1 | (0) |
| 2023–2024 | Mirandés | 6 | (0) |
| 2024 | Castellón | 14 | (0) |
| 2024–2026 | Celje | 50 | (15) |
| 2026– | Sporting Gijón | 7 | (1) |

International career
| 2018–2019 | Russia U18 | 10 | (4) |
| 2021 | Russia U21 | 2 | (0) |
- * Club domestic league appearances and goals as of 27 September 2026

Nikita Igorevich Iosifov (Russian: Никита Игоревич Иосифов; born 11 April 2001) is a Russian professional footballer who plays as a left winger for Spanish club Sporting Gijón.

== Club career ==
Iosifov is a youth product of FC Lokomotiv Moscow, and made his senior debut with farm team Kazanka Moscow in 2019. He made his Russian Premier League debut on 11 August 2020, in a game against FC Rubin Kazan; he substituted Dmitri Barinov in added time.

On 12 July 2021, Iosifov joined Villarreal in Spain on a five-year contract, and was initially assigned to the B-team. He was occasionally included in the matchday squads of the senior team for La Liga and UEFA Champions League games early in the 2021–22 season, but remained on the bench.

Iosifov made his first team debut for the Yellow Submarine on 30 November 2021, in a Copa del Rey game against the sixth-tier club Victoria CF, and scored Villarreal's last goal in a 8–0 victory. He made his La Liga debut on 22 January 2022 against Mallorca as an added-time substitute for Moi Gómez. At the end of the 2021–22 season, Villarreal B was promoted to the second-tier Segunda División.

Iosifov left Villarreal on 30 June 2023, as his contract expired, and signed a two-year contract with Mirandés on 5 July. The following 19 January, he left the club on a mutual agreement, and agreed to an 18-month deal with Castellón immediately after.

On 11 August 2024, Iosifov moved to Slovenian side Celje on a one-year deal. The following 2 July, he agreed to a one-year extension, and scored 16 goals during the season.

On 13 July 2026, Iosifov returned to Spain and its second division, signing a one-year contract with Sporting Gijón.

== Career statistics ==
As of match played 27 September 2026

Appearances and goals by club, season and competition
| Club | Season | League | | | National cup (Note: Includes Russian Cup, Copa del Rey, and Slovenian Football Cup) | | Continental | | Other | | Total | |
| Club | Season | Division | Apps | Goals | Apps | Goals | Apps | Goals | Apps | Goals | Apps | Goals |
|---|---|---|---|---|---|---|---|---|---|---|---|---|
| Kazanka Moscow | 2019–20 | Russian Second League | 10 | 2 | — | | — | | — | | 10 | 2 |
| Kazanka Moscow | 2020–21 | Russian Second League | 5 | 0 | — | | — | | — | | 5 | 0 |
| Kazanka Moscow | Total | | 15 | 2 | 0 | 0 | 0 | 0 | 0 | 0 | 15 | 2 |
| Lokomotiv Moscow | 2020–21 | Russian Premier League | 4 | 0 | 1 | 0 | 1 (Note: Appearance in UEFA Champions League) | 0 | 0 | 0 | 6 | 0 |
| Villarreal B | 2021–22 | Primera División RFEF | 28 | 5 | — | | — | | 2 (Note: Appearances in Primera División RFEF play-offs) | 1 | 30 | 6 |
| Villarreal B | 2022–23 | Segunda División | 13 | 1 | — | | — | | — | | 13 | 1 |
| Villarreal B | Total | | 41 | 6 | 0 | 0 | 0 | 0 | 2 | 1 | 43 | 7 |
| Villarreal | 2021–22 | La Liga | 1 | 0 | 1 | 1 | 0 | 0 | — | | 2 | 1 |
| Mirandés | 2023–24 | Segunda División | 6 | 0 | 2 | 0 | — | | — | | 8 | 0 |
| Castellón | 2023–24 | Primera Federación | 14 | 0 | — | | — | | 2 (Note: Appearances in Primera Federación final) | 0 | 16 | 0 |
| Celje | 2024–25 | Slovenian PrvaLiga | 17 | 3 | 3 | 1 | 1 (Note: Appearance in UEFA Conference League) | 0 | — | | 21 | 4 |
| Celje | 2025–26 | Slovenian PrvaLiga | 33 | 12 | 1 | 0 | 18 (Note: Four appearances and one goal in UEFA Europa League, fourteen appearances and three goals in UEFA Conference League) | 4 | — | | 52 | 16 |
| Celje | Total | | 50 | 15 | 4 | 1 | 19 | 4 | 0 | 0 | 73 | 20 |
| Sporting Gijón | 2026–27 | Segunda División | 7 | 1 | 0 | 0 | — | | — | | 7 | 1 |
| Career total | | | 138 | 24 | 8 | 2 | 20 | 4 | 4 | 1 | 170 | 31 |

== Honours ==
Lokomotiv Moscow

- Russian Cup: 2020–21

Celje

- Slovenian PrvaLiga: 2025–26
- Slovenian Football Cup: 2024–25

Individual

- Slovenian PrvaLiga top goalscorer: 2025–26
