= Žan-Luk Leban =

Slovenian footballer (born 2002)

Personal information
- Date of birth: 15 December 2002 (age 23)
- Place of birth: Trbovlje, Slovenia
- Height: 1.88 m (6 ft 2 in)
- Position: Goalkeeper

Team information
- Current team: Celje
- Number: 1

Youth career
- –2019: FCB Escola Varsovia
- 2019–2023: Everton

Senior career*
Years	Team	Apps	(Gls)
2021–2025	Everton	0	(0)
2023–2024	→ Farsley Celtic (loan)	41	(0)
2025–	Celje	29	(0)

International career
2017–2018	Slovenia U16	4	(0)
2018–2019	Slovenia U17	10	(0)
2023–2025	Slovenia U21	5	(0)
- * Club domestic league appearances and goals as of 21:43, 4 June 2026 (UTC)

Žan-Luk Leban (born 15 December 2002) is a Slovenian professional footballer who plays as a goalkeeper for Slovenian PrvaLiga club Celje.

He played for Slovenia's under-16, under-17 and under-21 teams.

== Early life ==
Born in Trbovlje, Leban moved to Poland at the age of six as his parents were looking for work. As a youth player for FCB Escola Varsovia, he attracted the likes of Barcelona, Manchester United, Tottenham Hotspur, Leicester City, and Liverpool. At the age of 15, he attended trials with Barcelona and almost signed for the team.

== Club career ==
=== Everton ===
Leban joined Everton's youth academy in June 2019. In the 2020–21 FA Youth Cup fourth round match against Manchester City, Leban made some important saves and was praised for his performance as Everton won 1–0. He was first included in the Everton senior squad on 20 March 2021 for the 2020–21 FA Cup quarter-final match against Manchester City, when Everton manager Carlo Ancelotti called up two youth goalkeepers due to injuries; however, he was an unused substitute as João Virgínia started the match.

In February 2023, Leban extended his contract with Everton until the summer of 2025.

In August 2023, he went on a season-long loan to National League North side Farsley Celtic.

After the 2024–25 season, Leban departed Everton upon the expiration of his contract.

== Personal life ==
He is the son of former Slovenian basketball international Boštjan Leban.

== Honours ==
Celje

- Slovenian PrvaLiga: 2025–26
