= Mark Zabukovnik =

Slovenian footballer (born 2000)

Personal information
- Date of birth: 27 December 2000 (age 25)
- Height: 1.85 m (6 ft 1 in)
- Position: Defensive midfielder

Team information
- Current team: Celje
- Number: 19

Youth career
- 2007–2019: Radomlje

Senior career*
Years	Team	Apps	(Gls)
2018–2022	Radomlje	79	(10)
2022–	Celje	88	(7)

International career^{‡}
2021–2022	Slovenia U21	10	(1)
2024–	Slovenia	9	(0)
- * Club domestic league appearances and goals as of 21 November 2025 ‡ National team caps and goals as of 16 November 2026

Mark Zabukovnik (born 27 December 2000) is a Slovenian professional footballer who plays as a defensive midfielder for Celje and the Slovenia national team.

== International career ==
Zabukovnik made his debut for the Slovenia national team on 20 January 2024 in a friendly against the United States.

== Honours ==
Celje

- Slovenian PrvaLiga: 2025–26
