= Tamar Svetlin =

Slovenian footballer (born 2001)

Personal information
- Date of birth: 30 July 2001 (age 25)
- Place of birth: Ljubljana, Slovenia
- Height: 1.77 m (5 ft 10 in)
- Position: Midfielder

Team information
- Current team: Saint-Étienne
- Number: 16

Youth career
- Arne Tabor 69
- Bravo
- 2016–2019: Domžale

Senior career*
Years	Team	Apps	(Gls)
2019–2021	Domžale	55	(4)
2021–2025	Celje	90	(11)
2022–2023	→ Bravo (loan)	23	(2)
2025–2026	Korona Kielce	34	(1)
2026–	Saint-Étienne	4	(0)

International career^{‡}
2016	Slovenia U15	6	(0)
2017	Slovenia U16	5	(3)
2016–2018	Slovenia U17	31	(7)
2018–2019	Slovenia U18	3	(0)
2018–2020	Slovenia U19	22	(2)
2020–2021	Slovenia U21	9	(1)
2024–	Slovenia	7	(1)
- * Club domestic league appearances and goals as of 09:05, 6 September 2026 (UTC) ‡ National team caps and goals as of 21:43, 4 June 2026 (UTC)

Tamar Svetlin (born 30 July 2001) is a Slovenian professional footballer who plays as a midfielder for Ligue 2 club Saint-Étienne and the Slovenia national team.

== International career ==
Svetlin previously represented Slovenia at all youth international levels from under-15 to under-21. He made his debut for the senior team in a January 2024 friendly match away against the United States. In his second appearance for the team, on 6 June 2025, he scored the only goal of the match in a 1–0 friendly win against Luxembourg.

== Career statistics ==
=== International ===
As of match played 4 June 2026

Appearances and goals by national team and year
National team	Year	Apps	Goals
Slovenia	2024	1	0
Slovenia	2025	3	1
Slovenia	2026	3	0
Total		7	1

Scores and results list Slovenia's goal tally first, score column indicates score after each Svetlin goal.

List of international goals scored by Tamar Svetlin
No.	Date	Venue	Opponent	Score	Result	Competition
1	6 June 2025	Stade de Luxembourg, Luxembourg City, Luxembourg	Luxembourg	1–0	1–0	Friendly

== Honours ==
Celje

- Slovenian PrvaLiga: 2023–24
- Slovenian Cup: 2024–25
