= Marco Dulca =

Romanian footballer (born 1999)

Personal information
- Full name: Marco Alexandru Dulca
- Date of birth: 11 May 1999 (age 27)
- Place of birth: Pohang, South Korea
- Height: 1.84 m (6 ft 0 in)
- Position: Midfielder

Team information
- Current team: Kayserispor
- Number: 88

Youth career
- 2004–2015: Universitatea Cluj
- 2015–2019: Swansea City

Senior career*
Years	Team	Apps	(Gls)
2019–2021	Viitorul Constanța	14	(0)
2020–2021	→ Chindia Târgoviște (loan)	31	(2)
2021–2022	Chindia Târgoviște	36	(2)
2022–2023	FCSB	5	(0)
2023	Chindia Târgoviște	16	(0)
2023–2025	Celje	38	(0)
2025–2026	Petrolul Ploiești	23	(2)
2026–	Kayserispor	9	(0)

International career
2015	Romania U17 (Note: Official competitive matches only)	1	(0)
2018	Romania U19	3	(0)
2017–2021	Romania U21	6	(0)
2021	Romania Olympic	3	(0)
- * Club domestic league appearances and goals as of 8 November 2026

Marco Alexandru Dulca (born 11 May 1999) is a Romanian professional footballer who plays as a midfielder for TFF 1. Lig club Kayserispor.

== Club career ==
=== Early career and Viitorul Constanța ===
Dulca started practising football with Universitatea Cluj at the age of five, and remained at the club for more than a decade before joining the academy of Swansea City in 2015.

He returned to Romania four years later after signing with Viitorul Constanța, where he recorded his senior debut in a 3–2 Liga I victory over Hermannstadt on 28 July 2019.

=== Chindia Târgoviște ===
On 30 August 2020, Dulca was loaned out to fellow league team Chindia Târgoviște. He scored his first career goal in a 2–2 home draw with Argeș Pitești on 19 December, and totalled 33 matches in all competitions during the 2020–21 season.

During the summer of 2021, Dulca joined Chindia Târgoviște on a permanent basis as part of a swap deal.

=== FCSB ===
On 5 August 2022, FCSB officially announced the signing of Dulca after diverting him from his way to 1899 Hoffenheim and meeting his €200,000 release clause. He made his debut the following day in a 1–1 league draw at Mioveni.

=== Celje ===
On 14 September 2023, Dulca moved abroad for the first time in his senior career and signed with Slovenian PrvaLiga outfit Celje on a contract until 2026.

== International career ==
Dulca represented the Romania national under-23 team in the 2020 Summer Olympics in Japan, starting in all three games of the group-stage exit.

== Personal life ==
Dulca was born in Pohang, South Korea, where his father Cristian was playing for Pohang Steelers. The latter was also a professional footballer and was part of the Romania squad for the 1998 FIFA World Cup.

In 2021, it was reported that Dulca started dating Mihaela Buzărnescu, a Romanian tennis player 11 years his senior. They ended their relationship the following year, after she accused him of emotional abuse.

== Career statistics ==
As of match played 9 November 2026

Appearances and goals by club, season and competition
Club	Season	League			National cup (Note: Includes Cupa României, Slovenian Cup)		Continental		Other		Total	
Club	Season	Division	Apps	Goals	Apps	Goals	Apps	Goals	Apps	Goals	Apps	Goals
Viitorul Constanța	2019–20	Liga I	14	0	1	0	0	0	0	0	15	0
Chindia Târgoviște (loan)	2020–21	Liga I	31	2	2	0	—		—		33	2
Chindia Târgoviște	2021–22	Liga I	33	2	2	0	—		2 (Note: Appearances in Liga I promotion/relegation play-offs)	0	37	2
Chindia Târgoviște	2022–23	Liga I	19	0	—		—		—		19	0
Chindia Târgoviște	Total		83	4	4	0	—		2	0	89	4
FCSB	2022–23	Liga I	5	0	3	0	5 (Note: Appearances in UEFA Conference League)	0	—		13	0
Celje	2023–24	Slovenian PrvaLiga	21	0	2	0	—		—		23	0
Celje	2024–25	Slovenian PrvaLiga	17	0	4	1	13 (Note: Two appearances in UEFA Champions League, two appearances in UEFA Europa League, nine appearances in UEFA Conference League)	0	—		34	1
Celje	Total		38	0	6	1	13	0	—		57	1
Petrolul Ploiești	2025–26	Liga I	23	2	1	0	—		—		24	2
Kayserispor	2026–27	TFF 1. Lig	9	0	0	0	—		—		9	0
Career total			172	6	15	1	18	0	2	0	207	7

== Honours ==
Viitorul Constanța

- Supercupa României: 2019

Celje

- Slovenian PrvaLiga: 2023–24
- Slovenian Cup: 2024–25
