= Behar Feta =

Macedonian football player (born 2003)

Personal information
- Date of birth: 7 April 2003 (age 23)
- Place of birth: Skopje, Macedonia
- Height: 1.67 m (5 ft 6 in)
- Positions: Winger; full-back

Team information
- Current team: Maribor
- Number: 99

Youth career
- Fortuna
- Shkëndija

Senior career*
Years	Team	Apps	(Gls)
2021–2023	Voska Sport	57	(37)
2023–2025	Maribor	16	(0)
2024–2025	→ Domžale (loan)	14	(0)
2025–2026	Aluminij	30	(10)
2026–	Maribor	12	(0)

International career
2018–2019	North Macedonia U17 (Note: Only appearances in official UEFA competitive matches are listed.)	6	(3)
2021	North Macedonia U19	3	(1)
2023–2024	North Macedonia U21	7	(1)
- * Club domestic league appearances and goals as of 22 November 2026

Behar Feta (born 7 April 2003) is a Macedonian footballer who plays as a winger for Slovenian PrvaLiga club Maribor.

== Club career ==
Born in Skopje, Feta began his career at hometown club Fortuna, before moving to Shkëndija. He made his senior debut with Voska Sport, where he scored 29 goals in 28 games during the 2022–23 Macedonian Second League season, helping the team earn promotion to the Macedonian First League.

Feta joined Slovenian PrvaLiga side Maribor in August 2023, signing a three-year contract. His first season was cut short by a foot injury in November 2023, which sidelined him until the spring part of the season.

In September 2024, Feta was sent on a season-long loan to fellow PrvaLiga side Domžale. He made his debut for the club on 15 September in a goalless draw against Bravo.

== International career ==
A North Macedonia youth international at the under-17 and under-19 level, he was called up to the under-21 team for their UEFA European Under-21 Championship qualifying matches against Sweden and the Netherlands in September 2023. He made his official competitive debut in a 1–0 away win against the former on 8 September 2023, starting the match and playing the full 90 minutes. He scored his first goal for the under-21 side in October 2024 against Moldova. The following month, Feta was called up to the senior team for the first time, ahead of their UEFA Nations League matches against Latvia and the Faroe Islands.

== Style of play ==
Primarily a winger, he has also been deployed by Maribor at left-back.
