= Nino Kouter =

Slovenian footballer (born 1993)

Personal information
- Date of birth: 19 December 1993 (age 32)
- Place of birth: Murska Sobota, Slovenia
- Height: 1.73 m (5 ft 8 in)
- Position: Defensive midfielder

Team information
- Current team: Mura
- Number: 10

Youth career
- Tišina
- 2005–2011: Mura 05
- 2008–2009: → Črenšovci (loan)

Senior career*
Years	Team	Apps	(Gls)
2010–2013	Mura 05	58	(0)
2012	→ Čarda (loan)	10	(3)
2013–2014	Zavrč	4	(0)
2014–2016	Veržej	58	(5)
2016–2017	UFC Bad Radkersburg	25	(3)
2017–2021	Mura	128	(18)
2021–2022	Manisa	25	(1)
2022–2025	Celje	80	(6)
2025–	Mura	46	(4)

International career
2011	Slovenia U19	2	(0)
2020–2021	Slovenia	6	(0)
- * Club domestic league appearances and goals as of 22:37, 10 November 2026 (UTC)

Nino Kouter (born 19 December 1993) is a Slovenian professional footballer who plays as a defensive midfielder for Slovenian PrvaLiga club Mura.

== Club career ==
Kouter made his senior debut for Mura 05 in the Slovenian Second League on 8 August 2010, coming on as a substitute in the 66th minute for Marko Smodiš in the home match against Interblock, which finished as a 1–1 draw.

== International career ==
Kouter made his international debut for Slovenia on 3 September 2020 in the UEFA Nations League match against Greece, coming on as a substitute in the 78th minute for Jaka Bijol, with the home match finishing as a 0–0 draw.

== Career statistics ==
=== International ===
As of match played 4 June 2021

Appearances and goals by national team and year
National team	Year	Apps	Goals
Slovenia	2020	4	0
Slovenia	2021	2	0
Total		6	0

== Honours ==
FC Bad Radkersburg

- Oberliga Süd Ost: 2016–17

Mura

- Slovenian PrvaLiga: 2020–21
- Slovenian Cup: 2019–20
- Slovenian Second League: 2017–18

Celje

- Slovenian PrvaLiga: 2023–24
- Slovenian Cup: 2024–25
