= Matjaž Rozman =

Slovenian footballer (born 1987)

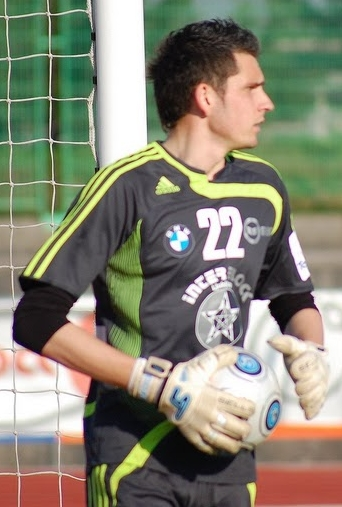
- Rozman in 2009

Personal information
- Date of birth: 3 January 1987 (age 39)
- Place of birth: Ptuj, SFR Yugoslavia
- Height: 1.92 m (6 ft 4 in)
- Position: Goalkeeper

Team information
- Current team: Bravo
- Number: 77

Youth career
- Gerečja vas
- –2006: Aluminij

Senior career*
Years	Team	Apps	(Gls)
2004–2006	Aluminij	36	(0)
2006–2009	Interblock	76	(0)
2010–2011	SpVgg Greuther Fürth II	11	(0)
2012–2015	Rudar Velenje	99	(0)
2015–2016	Slaven Belupo	34	(0)
2016–2025	Celje	175	(0)
2025–2026	Aluminij	26	(0)
2026–	Bravo	5	(0)

International career
2006–2007	Slovenia U20	2	(0)
2007–2008	Slovenia U21	5	(0)
- * Club domestic league appearances and goals as of 23 August 2026

Matjaž Rozman (born 3 January 1987) is a Slovenian footballer who plays as a goalkeeper for Slovenian PrvaLiga club Bravo.

== Club career ==
Rozman left Aluminij after his first senior season in July 2006 and signed with Interblock, earning 76 league caps.

In January 2010, he signed a two-and-a-half-year contract with SpVgg Greuther Fürth. He never broke into the first team and was eventually sent to the reserves. On 30 August 2011, he was released from his contract.

== International career ==
Rozman was a member of the Slovenia under-21 team, making five appearances between 2007 and 2008.

== Honours ==
Interblock

- Slovenian Cup: 2007–08, 2008–09

Celje

- Slovenian PrvaLiga: 2019–20, 2023–24
- Slovenian Cup: 2024–25

Individual

- Slovenian PrvaLiga Team of the Year: 2019–20
