= Svit Sešlar =

Slovenian football player (born 2002)

Personal information
- Date of birth: 9 January 2002 (age 24)
- Place of birth: Maribor, Slovenia
- Height: 1.85 m (6 ft 1 in)
- Position: Midfielder

Team information
- Current team: Celje
- Number: 10

Youth career
- –2015: Dravinja
- 2016: Aluminij
- 2016–2018: Celje
- 2018: Drava Ptuj
- 2019–2020: Olimpija Ljubljana

Senior career*
Years	Team	Apps	(Gls)
2018	Drava Ptuj	5	(1)
2020–2023	Olimpija Ljubljana	74	(12)
2020	→ Krka (loan)	3	(1)
2023–2025	Eyüpspor	33	(3)
2024–2025	→ Celje (loan)	26	(10)
2025–	Celje	5	(4)

International career^{‡}
2017–2018	Slovenia U16	7	(0)
2019	Slovenia U18	2	(0)
2021–2025	Slovenia U21	22	(1)
2024–	Slovenia	7	(0)
- * Club domestic league appearances and goals as of 3 March 2026 ‡ National team caps and goals as of 7 June 2026

Svit Sešlar (born 9 January 2002) is a Slovenian professional footballer who plays as a midfielder for Slovenian PrvaLiga club Celje and the Slovenia national team.

== Club career ==
Sešlar grew up in Slovenske Konjice and started his career with local side Dravinja, and later also played youth football for Aluminij, Celje and Drava Ptuj. In early 2019, he signed for Slovenian top flight side Olimpija Ljubljana. He made his Slovenian PrvaLiga debut for Olimpija on 14 February 2021 in a 2–0 victory over Mura. In January 2022, he extended his contract with the club until 2026.

== International career ==
Sešlar made his Slovenia national team debut on 14 November 2024 in a Nations League game against Norway at the Stožice Stadium. He substituted Petar Stojanović in the 81st minute, as Norway won 4–1.

== Personal life ==
Sešlar is the son of Simon Sešlar, a former Slovenian international footballer. He has two sisters, Hana and Lina.

== Career statistics ==
As of 26 June 2025

Appearances and goals by club, season and competition
Club	Season	League			National cup (Note: Includes Slovenian Cup, Turkish Cup)		Continental		Total	
Club	Season	Division	Apps	Goals	Apps	Goals	Apps	Goals	Apps	Goals
Drava Ptuj	2018–19	2. SNL	5	1	1	0	—		6	1
Olimpija Ljubljana	2019–20	1. SNL	0	0	0	0	0	0	0	0
Olimpija Ljubljana	2020–21	1. SNL	4	0	1	0	0	0	5	0
Olimpija Ljubljana	2021–22	1. SNL	32	2	1	0	4 (Note: Appearances in UEFA Conference League)	0	37	2
Olimpija Ljubljana	2022–23	1. SNL	34	9	5	0	2	1	41	10
Olimpija Ljubljana	2023–24	1. SNL	4	1	0	0	7 (Note: Six appearances in UEFA Champions League, one appearance in UEFA Europa League)	0	11	1
Olimpija Ljubljana	Total		74	12	7	0	13	1	94	13
Krka (loan)	2020–21	2. SNL	3	1	0	0	—		3	1
Eyüpspor	2023–24	TFF First League	21	2	2	0	—		23	2
Eyüpspor	2024–25	Süper Lig	2	0	0	0	—		2	0
Eyüpspor	Total		23	2	2	0	—		25	2
Celje (loan)	2024–25	1. SNL	26	10	5	1	12	2	43	13
Career total			131	26	15	1	25	3	171	30

== Honours ==
Olimpija Ljubljana

- Slovenian PrvaLiga: 2022–23
- Slovenian Cup: 2020–21, 2022–23

Celje

- Slovenian PrvaLiga: 2025–26
- Slovenian Cup: 2024–25

Individual

- UEFA Conference League Team of the Season: 2024–25
- Slovenian PrvaLiga Young player of the Year: 2024–25
- Slovenian PrvaLiga Team of the Season: 2024–25, 2025–26
