= Aljoša Matko =

Slovenian footballer (born 2000)

Personal information
- Date of birth: 29 March 2000 (age 26)
- Place of birth: Novo Mesto, Slovenia
- Height: 1.77 m (5 ft 10 in)
- Positions: Forward; winger

Team information
- Current team: Újpest
- Number: 17

Youth career
- 2005–2013: Bela Krajina
- 2013–2015: Krka
- 2015–2019: Maribor

Senior career*
Years	Team	Apps	(Gls)
2019–2021	Maribor	31	(7)
2019–2020	→ Bravo (loan)	34	(15)
2021–2022	Hammarby IF	13	(2)
2022	→ Olimpija Ljubljana (loan)	15	(1)
2022–2025	Celje	87	(39)
2025–	Újpest	41	(22)

International career^{‡}
2015–2016	Slovenia U16	14	(5)
2016–2017	Slovenia U17	12	(0)
2017–2018	Slovenia U18	5	(3)
2018–2019	Slovenia U19	12	(7)
2020–2022	Slovenia U21	18	(5)
2025–	Slovenia	11	(2)
- * Club domestic league appearances and goals as of 29 September 2026 ‡ National team caps and goals as of 16 November 2026

Aljoša Matko (born 29 March 2000) is a Slovenian footballer who plays as a forward for Nemzeti Bajnokság I club Újpest and the Slovenia national team.

== Early life ==
Matko was born in Novo Mesto and grew up in Črnomelj. He began his career at the age of four with local club Bela Krajina, where he stayed for eight years. In 2013 he moved to Krka, before joining the youth academy of domestic giants Maribor in 2015. He went on to score 67 goals in 93 games in the club's youth system.

== Club career ==
=== Maribor ===
In 2019–20, Matko was sent on loan from Maribor to fellow PrvaLiga club Bravo, where he made his debut in senior football. Matko scored 15 goals in 34 games for Bravo, that finished sixth in the table, which meant that he became the fourth best goalscorer in the whole league.

Back at Maribor for the 2020–21 season, Matko established himself as a starter under manager Mauro Camoranesi. At the end of 2020, he won the Purple Warrior, a trophy awarded to the most distinguished Maribor player in the past year. He was also named Slovenian Youth Footballer of the Year by the Slovenian magazine EkipaSN. On 29 January 2021, Matko extended his contract with Maribor until the summer of 2024. In April of the same year, Matko was involved in a car accident as a driver but escaped uninjured, although several passengers suffered from severe injuries. He soon returned to the pitch and ended the season making 29 league appearances, scoring seven goals, as Maribor finished second in the table behind Mura.

=== Hammarby IF ===
On 12 August 2021, Matko transferred to Hammarby IF in the Swedish Allsvenskan for an undisclosed fee, signing a three-year contract. He made his competitive debut for the club only four days later, on 16 August, in a 2–0 home loss to IF Elfsborg. On 22 August, he scored his first Allsvenskan goal for the club, against the same opponent, IF Elfsborg, in a 2–2 away draw.

On 1 February 2022, Matko returned to Slovenia by joining Olimpija Ljubljana on loan for the remainder of the PrvaLiga season, with an option to make the transfer permanent. He returned to Hammarby in July 2022, but failed to make any competitive appearances under new head coach Martí Cifuentes. In total, Matko played 13 Allsvenskan games for the club, scoring twice.

=== Celje ===
On 15 August 2022, Matko transferred to PrvaLiga club Celje and signed a two-year contract until 2024.

== International career ==
Between 2015 and 2022, Matko was capped for all Slovenian youth teams from under-16 to under-21, making over 60 appearances for all selections.

With the under-21 team, Matko appeared at the 2021 UEFA European Under-21 Championship, hosted by Slovenia. He featured in all three games in the group stage and scored Slovenia's only goal of the tournament in a 1–1 draw against Czech Republic.

== Career statistics ==
=== Club ===
As of match played 25 May 2025

Appearances and goals by club, season and competition
Club	Season	League			National cup (Note: Includes Slovenian Football Cup, Svenska Cupen)		Continental		Total	
Club	Season	Division	Apps	Goals	Apps	Goals	Apps	Goals	Apps	Goals
Maribor	2018–19	Slovenian PrvaLiga	0	0	0	0	0	0	0	0
Maribor	2020–21	Slovenian PrvaLiga	29	7	1	0	1 (Note: Appearance in UEFA Europa League)	0	31	7
Maribor	2021–22	Slovenian PrvaLiga	2	0	0	0	1 (Note: Appearance(s) in UEFA Conference League)	0	3	0
Maribor	Total		31	7	1	0	2	0	34	7
Bravo (loan)	2019–20	Slovenian PrvaLiga	34	15	1	0	—		35	15
Hammarby IF	2021	Allsvenskan	13	2	1	0	0	0	14	2
Olimpija Ljubljana (loan)	2021–22	Slovenian PrvaLiga	15	1	0	0	—		15	1
Celje	2022–23	Slovenian PrvaLiga	29	14	4	0	—		33	14
Celje	2023–24	Slovenian PrvaLiga	26	18	0	0	6	2	32	20
Celje	2024–25	Slovenian PrvaLiga	32	7	6	6	19 (Note: Four appearance and two goals in UEFA Champions League, two appearances in UEFA Europa League, thirteen appearances and two goals in UEFA Conference League)	4	57	17
Celje	Total		87	39	10	6	25	6	122	51
Career total			180	64	13	6	27	6	220	76

=== International ===
Scores and results list Slovenia's goal tally first, score column indicates score after each Matko goal.

List of international goals scored by Aljoša Matko
No.	Date	Venue	Opponent	Score	Result	Competition
1	29 September 2026	Stožice Stadium, Ljubljana, Slovenia	North Macedonia	2–0	2–0	2026–27 UEFA Nations League B
2	6 October 2026	Hampden Park, Glasgow, Scotland	Scotland	1–1	2–1	2026–27 UEFA Nations League B

== Honours ==
Maribor

- Slovenian PrvaLiga: 2018–19

Celje

- Slovenian PrvaLiga: 2023–24
- Slovenian Cup: 2024–25

Individual

- Slovenian PrvaLiga Team of the Season: 2023–24
- Slovenian PrvaLiga Player of the Month: August 2023, April 2025
- Slovenian PrvaLiga top scorer: 2023–24
- Nemzeti Bajnokság I top scorer: 2025–26
- Slovenian Youth Footballer of the Year: 2020
- NK Maribor Player of the Year: 2020
