= Klemen Nemanič =

Slovenian footballer (born 1996)

Personal information
- Date of birth: 7 November 1996 (age 30)
- Place of birth: Ljubljana, Slovenia
- Height: 1.94 m (6 ft 4 in)
- Position: Centre-back

Team information
- Current team: DAC Dunajská Streda
- Number: 81

Youth career
- –2010: Domžale
- 2011–2015: Interblock

Senior career*
Years	Team	Apps	(Gls)
2015–2018	Dob	48	(4)
2018	Legionovia Legionowo	15	(1)
2018–2022	Tabor Sežana	108	(4)
2022	FK Csíkszereda	13	(1)
2022–2025	Celje	55	(1)
2025–	DAC Dunajská Streda	40	(1)

International career
2011–2012	Slovenia U16	10	(0)
2012–2013	Slovenia U17	9	(0)
2014	Slovenia U19	4	(0)
- * Club domestic league appearances and goals as of 21 September 2026

Klemen Nemanič (born 7 November 1996) is a Slovenian professional footballer who plays as a defender for Slovak club DAC Dunajská Streda.

== Honours ==
Celje

- Slovenian PrvaLiga: 2023–24
- Slovenian Cup: 2024–25
