= David Zec =

Slovenian footballer (born 2000)

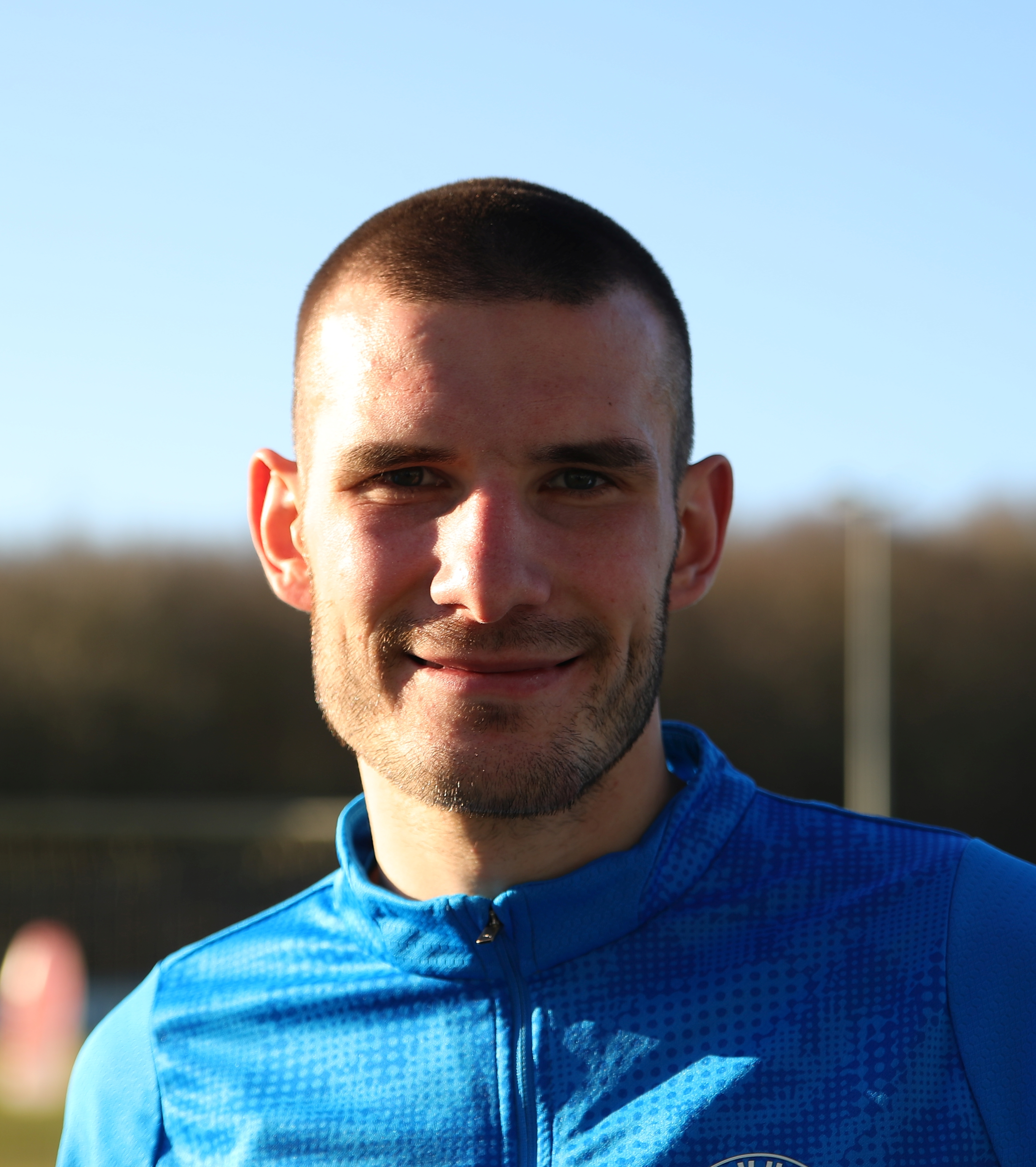
- Zec with Holstein Kiel in 2026

Personal information
- Date of birth: 5 January 2000 (age 26)
- Place of birth: Kranj, Slovenia
- Height: 1.90 m (6 ft 3 in)
- Position: Centre-back

Team information
- Current team: Holstein Kiel
- Number: 26

Youth career
- 2007–2018: Triglav Kranj
- 2018–2019: Benfica

Senior career*
Years	Team	Apps	(Gls)
2017–2018	Triglav Kranj	31	(2)
2018–2021	Benfica B	9	(0)
2020–2021	→ Rukh Lviv (loan)	9	(0)
2021–2024	Celje	110	(10)
2025–	Holstein Kiel	49	(8)

International career^{‡}
2016	Slovenia U16	6	(0)
2016–2017	Slovenia U17	12	(1)
2017–2018	Slovenia U18	4	(1)
2017–2019	Slovenia U19	12	(1)
2019–2022	Slovenia U21	16	(1)
2024–	Slovenia	10	(1)
- * Club domestic league appearances and goals as of 18 May 2026 ‡ National team caps and goals as of 16 November 2026

David Zec (born 5 January 2000) is a Slovenian professional footballer who plays as a centre-back for 2. Bundesliga club Holstein Kiel and the Slovenia national team.

== Club career ==
On 24 December 2024, Zec signed for Bundesliga club Holstein Kiel on a long-term contract.

== International career ==
Zec made his debut for Slovenia in a January 2024 friendly match away against the United States.

== Honours ==
Triglav Kranj

- Slovenian Second League: 2016–17

Celje

- Slovenian First League: 2023–24
