= Aljaž Krefl =

Slovenian footballer (born 1994)

Personal information
- Date of birth: 20 February 1994 (age 32)
- Place of birth: Slovenia
- Height: 1.73 m (5 ft 8 in)
- Position: Left-back

Team information
- Current team: Rudar Velenje

Youth career
- –2013: Rudar Velenje

Senior career*
Years	Team	Apps	(Gls)
2012–2015	Rudar Velenje	58	(3)
2013	→ Šmartno 1928 (loan)	9	(1)
2015–2019	Olimpija Ljubljana	20	(0)
2017	→ Spartak Subotica (loan)	10	(0)
2019–2020	Rudar Velenje	39	(1)
2020–2022	Aluminij	38	(5)
2022–2023	Olimpija Ljubljana	38	(0)
2024–2025	Celje	7	(0)
2025	→ Aluminij (loan)	9	(1)
2025–	Rudar Velenje	0	(0)

International career
2011–2012	Slovenia U18	9	(0)
2015–2016	Slovenia U21	10	(0)
- * Club domestic league appearances and goals as of 17 October 2025

Aljaž Krefl (born 20 February 1994) is a Slovenian professional footballer who plays as a left-back for Rudar Velenje.

== Club career ==
Krefl joined Olimpija Ljubljana from Rudar Velenje in June 2015.

On 8 February 2017, he was sent on loan to Serbian side Spartak Subotica.

== International career ==
Krefl was capped internationally for the Slovenia under-21 team.

== Honours ==
Olimpija Ljubljana

- Slovenian PrvaLiga: 2015–16, 2017–18, 2022–23
- Slovenian Cup: 2017–18, 2022–23

Celje

- Slovenian PrvaLiga: 2023–24
