= Danijel Šturm =

Slovenian footballer (born 1999)

Personal information
- Date of birth: 4 January 1999 (age 27)
- Place of birth: Šempeter pri Gorici, Slovenia
- Height: 1.82 m (6 ft 0 in)
- Position: Left winger

Team information
- Current team: Slavia Prague
- Number: 10

Youth career
- Tolmin
- Bilje

Senior career*
| Years | Team | Apps | (Gls) |
| 2015–2018 | Tolmin | 35 | (21) |
| 2018–2019 | Chiasso | 0 | (0) |
| 2018 | → Mendrisio (loan) | 7 | (2) |
| 2019 | → Tolmin (loan) | 12 | (12) |
| 2019–2021 | Bilje | 37 | (15) |
| 2021–2023 | Maribor | 28 | (1) |
| 2023 | → Aluminij (loan) | 12 | (0) |
| 2023–2025 | Domžale | 65 | (19) |
| 2025 | Celje | 18 | (5) |
| 2026 | Sigma Olomouc | 10 | (4) |
| 2026– | Slavia Prague | 12 | (2) |

International career^{‡}
| 2024– | Slovenia | 16 | (4) |
- * Club domestic league appearances and goals as of 1 November 2026 ‡ National team caps and goals as of 16 November 2026

Danijel Šturm (born 4 January 1999) is a Slovenian professional footballer who plays as a winger for Czech First League club Slavia Prague and the Slovenia national team.

== Club career ==
After playing in the lower divisions in Slovenia and Switzerland, Šturm joined Slovenian top division club Maribor in the summer of 2021. He made his league debut on 18 July 2021 against Celje, and scored his first goal for Maribor the same month against Urartu in the UEFA Europa Conference League qualifiers.

== International career ==
Šturm made his debut for the senior Slovenia national team on 20 January 2024 in a friendly against the United States.

== Career statistics ==
=== International ===
As of match played 16 November 2026

Appearances and goals by national team and year
| National team | Year | Apps | Goals |
|---|---|---|---|
| Slovenia | 2024 | 1 | 0 |
| Slovenia | 2025 | 5 | 0 |
| Slovenia | 2026 | 10 | 4 |
| Total | | 16 | 4 |

Scores and results list Slovenia's goal tally first, score column indicates score after each Šturm goal.

List of international goals scored by Danijel Šturm
| No. | Date | Venue | Opponent | Score | Result | Competition |
|---|---|---|---|---|---|---|
| 1 | 31 March 2026 | Podgorica City Stadium, Podgorica, Montenegro | Montenegro | 2–2 | 3–2 | Friendly |
| 2 | 6 October 2026 | Hampden Park, Glasgow, Scotland | Scotland | 2–1 | 2–1 | 2026–27 UEFA Nations League B |
| 3 | 16 November 2026 | Toše Proeski Arena, Skopje, North Macedonia | North Macedonia | 1–0 | 3–0 | 2026–27 UEFA Nations League B |
| 4 | 16 November 2026 | Toše Proeski Arena, Skopje, North Macedonia | North Macedonia | 3–0 | 3–0 | 2026–27 UEFA Nations League B |
