= 2025–26 Slovenian PrvaLiga =

35th season of the Slovenian PrvaLiga

Slovenian PrvaLiga
- Season: 2025–26
- Dates: 18 July 2025 – 23 May 2026
- Champions: Celje (3rd title)
- Relegated: Primorje; Domžale
- Champions League: Celje
- Europa League: Aluminij (cup winners)
- Conference League: Koper; Bravo
- Matches: 162
- Goals: 500 (3.09 per match)
- Best player: Josip Iličić
- Top goalscorer: Nikita Iosifov; Benjamin Tetteh (12 goals each)
- Biggest home win: Celje 5–0 Aluminij (26 April 2026)
- Biggest away win: Radomlje 0–6 Bravo (30 August 2025)
- Highest scoring: Koper 6–2 Bravo (31 January 2026)
- Highest attendance: 8,900; Maribor 1–1 Olimpija
- Total attendance: 214,515
- Average attendance: 1,332

The 2025–26 Slovenian PrvaLiga was the 35th edition of the Slovenian PrvaLiga since its establishment in 1991. The season began on 18 July 2025 and ended on 23 May 2026.

Celje won the league for their third PrvaLiga title. As champions, they qualified for the second qualifying round of the 2026–27 UEFA Champions League.

Two-time champions Domžale withdrew from the league after 18 rounds due to financial insolvency and were subsequently dissolved.

== Teams ==
Olimpija Ljubljana entered the season as defending champions after winning their fourth title in the previous season. Nafta 1903 were relegated at the end of the previous season, and were replaced by Aluminij.

=== Stadiums and locations ===
Locations of the 2025–26 Slovenian PrvaLiga teams

Team	Location	Stadium	Capacity
Aluminij	Kidričevo	Aluminij Sports Park	789
Bravo	Ljubljana	Stožice Stadium	16,038
Celje	Celje	Stadion Z'dežele	13,059
Domžale	Domžale	Domžale Sports Park	3,100
Koper	Koper	Bonifika Stadium	4,047
Maribor	Maribor	Ljudski vrt	11,709
Mura	Murska Sobota	Fazanerija City Stadium	4,506
Olimpija Ljubljana	Ljubljana	Stožice Stadium	16,038
Primorje	Ajdovščina	Ajdovščina Stadium	1,630
Radomlje	Radomlje	Domžale Sports Park	3,100

== League table ==
Pos	Team	Pld	W	D	L	GF	GA	GD	Pts	Qualification or relegation
1	Celje (C)	34	23	5	6	85	32	+53	74	Qualification for the Champions League second qualifying round
2	Koper	34	20	7	7	71	43	+28	67	Qualification for the Conference League second qualifying round
3	Bravo	34	19	5	10	62	51	+11	62	Qualification for the Conference League second qualifying round
4	Olimpija Ljubljana	34	16	7	11	50	40	+10	55	
5	Maribor	34	15	8	11	57	43	+14	53	
6	Radomlje	34	13	6	15	50	63	−13	45	
7	Aluminij	34	10	6	18	42	61	−19	36	Qualification for the Europa League first qualifying round (Note: Aluminij qualified as the 2025–26 Slovenian Cup winners)
8	Mura	34	8	7	19	35	55	−20	31	
9	Primorje (R)	34	6	4	24	31	74	−43	22	Qualification for the relegation play-offs
10	Domžale (D, R)	18	3	3	12	17	38	−21	12	Withdrew and dissolved

Source: PrvaLiga
Rules for classification: 1) Points; 2) Head-to-head points; 3) Head-to-head goal difference; 4) Head-to-head goals scored; 5) Goal difference; 6) Goals scored
(C) Champions; (D) Disqualified; (R) Relegated

=== Results ===
Home \ Away	ALU	BRA	CEL	DOM	KOP	MAR	MUR	OLI	PRI	RAD
Aluminij		1–3	2–3	3–1	1–0	2–3	2–2	0–3	0–0	2–1
Aluminij		0–1	2–1		2–4	1–1	2–1	1–2	0–0	1–2
Bravo	1–2		0–5	1–1	4–2	2–3	2–0	2–1	3–0	0–4
Bravo	2–1		1–0		1–1	3–0	0–2	2–1	2–1	2–1
Celje	2–1	0–0		4–1	1–1	3–0	3–0	0–0	4–1	2–0
Celje	5–0	2–3			1–2	1–0	5–1	2–0	5–1	3–1
Domžale	0–2	1–0	0–2		1–3	1–2	3–3	1–3	1–0	1–1
Koper	4–1	2–1	3–3	2–1		1–0	2–1	1–0	2–0	1–2
Koper	1–0	6–2	0–1			3–1	3–0	3–2	2–1	2–2
Maribor	2–3	3–3	1–2	3–0	2–2		1–0	1–1	4–0	5–1
Maribor	3–0	2–0	3–3		2–0		3–0	0–3 (Note: The match was suspended in the 52nd minute with the score 1–0 for Olimpija Ljubljana, and was later registered as 3–0 for Olimpija.)	2–0	2–2
Mura	1–1	1–1	2–1	3–0	3–2	0–1		0–2	2–2	0–0
Mura	0–3	1–2	0–2		0–1	2–1		0–0	3–1	2–0
Olimpija Ljubljana	1–1	1–2	0–5	1–2	1–3	1–0	1–0		2–0	2–1
Olimpija Ljubljana	2–1	1–2	3–1		3–3	0–0	1–0		3–0	2–1
Primorje	4–1	1–3	2–3	3–2	2–1	0–2	1–0	1–1		1–2
Primorje	2–0	3–2	0–4		0–4	0–2	0–2	0–2		2–3
Radomlje	1–2	0–6	0–3	2–0	1–1	1–1	3–1	3–2	3–1	
Radomlje	2–1	1–3	1–3		0–3	2–1	3–2	1–2	2–1	

Source: PrvaLiga
Legend: Blue = home team win; Yellow = draw; Red = away team win.

== PrvaLiga play-off ==
A two-legged play-off between the ninth-placed team from the PrvaLiga, Primorje, and the second-placed team from the 2025–26 Slovenian Second League, Nafta 1903, was played. The winner earned a place in the 2026–27 PrvaLiga season.

27 May 2026
18:00 UTC+2

Primorje	0–0	Nafta 1903
	Report

Ajdovščina City Stadium, Ajdovščina
Attendance: 800
Referee: David Šmajc
31 May 2026
17:00 UTC+2

Nafta 1903	1–0	Primorje
Maroša 90+3'	Report

Lendava Sports Park, Lendava
Attendance: 1,500
Referee: Aleksandar Matković

Nafta 1903 won 1–0 on aggregate.

== Statistics ==
=== Top scorers ===
Rank	Player	Club	Goals
1	(Russia) Nikita Iosifov	Celje	12
1	(Ghana) Benjamin Tetteh	Maribor	12
3	(Croatia) Franko Kovačević	Celje	11
4	(Bosnia and Herzegovina) Admir Bristrić	Bravo	10
4	(North Macedonia) Behar Feta	Aluminij	10
4	(Slovenia) Josip Iličić	Koper	10
4	(Slovenia) Jaša Martinčič	Radomlje	10
8	(Central African Republic) Vénuste Baboula	Bravo	9
8	(Croatia) Antonio Marin	Olimpija Ljubljana	9
8	(Slovenia) Leo Rimac	Koper	9
8	(Slovenia) Andraž Ruedl	Koper	9
8	(Slovenia) Emir Saitoski	Aluminij	9
8	(Slovenia) Svit Sešlar	Celje	9

== See also ==
- 2025–26 Slovenian Football Cup
- 2025–26 Slovenian Second League
