= NK Bravo =

Bravo
- Full name: Nogometni klub Bravo
- Nickname: Šiškarji (The Boys from Šiška)
- Founded: 2006; 20 years ago
- Ground: Stožice Stadium
- Capacity: 16,038
- President: Luka Brezovec
- Head coach: Aleš Arnol
- League: Slovenian PrvaLiga
- 2025–26: Slovenian PrvaLiga, 3rd of 10
- Website: nk-bravo.si
Home colours	Away colours

Nogometni klub Bravo (English: Bravo Football Club), commonly referred simply as Bravo, is a Slovenian professional football club from Ljubljana, which plays in the Slovenian PrvaLiga, the top level of the football league system in the country. The club was founded in 2006.

== Players ==
=== Current squad ===
As of 6 August 2026

Note: Flags indicate national team as defined under FIFA eligibility rules; some limited exceptions apply. Players may hold more than one non-FIFA nationality.

No.	Pos.	Nation	Player
3	DF	GER	Christalino Atemona
4	DF	AUT	Jakob Brunnhofer (on loan from Rapid Wien II)
5	DF	CMR	Ibrahim Halilou
6	MF	SVN	Jon Ficko
7	FW	ITA	Divine Omoregie
8	MF	SVN	Sandi Nuhanović (captain)
9	FW	SVN	Aldin Jakupović (on loan from Holstein Kiel)
10	FW	SVN	Jakoslav Stanković
11	FW	CIV	Okpo Mazié
12	GK	SVN	Luka Dakić
14	MF	SVN	Enrik Ostrc
17	MF	NGA	James Arinze
20	MF	CIV	Nadon Kouassi
21	MF	SVN	Lan Štravs
22	GK	SVN	Benjamin Matičič

No.	Pos.	Nation	Player
23	GK	SVN	Artem Grom
24	DF	SVN	Gašper Jovan
27	DF	MKD	David Stojanoski
28	MF	SVN	Svit Blaško
31	DF	SVN	Viktor Božić
35	FW	SVN	Rok Kopatin
37	DF	SVN	Svit Mlekuž
42	DF	SVN	An Kumer Čelik
44	MF	SVN	Tit Kostić
66	DF	SVN	Jaša Kraševec
68	DF	FRA	Marwann Nzuzi
75	FW	SVN	Andrej Pečar
77	GK	SVN	Matjaž Rozman
95	DF	SVN	Maj Fogec
99	MF	SVN	Marko Simonič

== Honours ==
League

- Slovenian Second League
  - Winners: 2018–19
- Slovenian Third League
  - Winners: 2016–17
- Ljubljana Regional League (fourth tier)
  - Winners: 2014–15
- MNZ Ljubljana League (fifth tier)
  - Winners: 2013–14

Cup

- Slovenian Cup
  - Runners-up: 2021–22
- MNZ Ljubljana Cup
  - Winners: 2017–18

== European record ==
All results (home and away) list Bravo's goal tally first.

Season	Competition	Round	Opposition	Home	Away	Aggregate
2024–25	UEFA Conference League	First qualifying round	(Wales) Connah's Quay Nomads	0–1	2–0 (a.e.t.)	2–1
2024–25	UEFA Conference League	Second qualifying round	(Bosnia and Herzegovina) Zrinjski Mostar	1–3	1–0	2–3
2026–27	UEFA Conference League	Second qualifying round	(North Macedonia) Shkëndija	2–1	1–3	3–4
