= 2024–25 Slovenian Football Cup =

Tournament details
- Country: Slovenia

Final positions
- Champions: Celje (2nd title)
- Runners-up: Koper

The 2024–25 Slovenian Football Cup was the 34th edition of the football knockout tournament in Slovenia. Rogaška were the defending champions after winning their first title in the previous season.

Celje defeated Koper 4–0 in the final, winning their second title and their first since 2005.

== Preliminary round ==
Team 1	Score	Team 2
7 August 2024
Puconci	3–8	Ljutomer
9 August 2024
Apače (Murska Sobota)	1–2	Hodoš
11 August 2024
Nafta veterani	2–4	Graničar
Lipa	2–5	Veržej
Hotiza	2–2 (3–4 p)	Polana
Dobrovnik	0–5	Turnišče
Bogojina	3–0	Rakičan
Gančani	0–0 (5–4 p)	Grad
13 August 2024
Brda	0–3 (w/o)	Tolmin
Brinje Grosuplje	1–1 (3–4 p)	Krka
14 August 2024
Radenska Slatina	0–3	Beltinci
Svoboda Kisovec	0–4	Ilirija 1911
Šentjernej	1–8	Vrhnika
Ihan	0–9	Svoboda Ljubljana
Moravče	3–8	Zagorje
Bela Krajina	2–1	Kočevje
Kolpa	1–3	Jevnica
Dragomer	2–5	Litija
Komen	0–5	Izola
Jadran Hrpelje-Kozina	1–5	Jadran Dekani
Vodice Šempas	1–4	Bilje
Slovan	4–2	Šmartno Ljubljana
18 August 2024
Mostje	0–3	Čentiba
20 August 2024
Podlehnik	0–3 (w/o)	Apače (Ptuj)
Cirkulane	0–5	Središče
Makole	1–1 (4–3 p)	Markovci
Hajdoše	1–10	Gerečja vas
Vir	0–3	Dob
21 August 2024
Leskovec	0–3 (w/o)	Stojnci
Skorba	0–2	Bukovci
Rogoznica	4–2	Grajena
Oplotnica	0–4	Tržec
Polskava	0–6	Boč Poljčane
Trebnje	5–1	Viktorija
Dravograd	0–4	Korotan Prevalje
Radlje	0–13	Dobrovce
Limbuš Pekre	2–1	Fužinar
Škofja Loka	6–2	Bled-Bohinj
Šenčur	1–1 (5–6 p)	Velesovo Cerklje
Jesenice	6–0	Sava Kranj
Ljubljana	0–2	Arne Tabor 69
22 August 2024
Dornava	2–5	Pragersko
Zgornja Polskava	4–0	Slovenja vas
24 August 2024
Lenart	0–1	Peca
Malečnik	1–3	Marjeta
Duplek	0–7	Rače
Pesnica	2–1	Roho
Polet	1–0	Visoko
Kranjska Gora	2–11	Preddvor
Pohorje	1–1 (2–4 p)	Jurovski Dol
25 August 2024
Bitnje	3–3 (3–5 p)	Jezero Medvode
27 August 2024
Britof	1–3	Triglav Kranj
28 August 2024
Mons Claudius	0–5	Rudar Velenje
Šmarje pri Jelšah	0–8	Dravinja
3 September 2024
Žalec	2–0	Šampion

== First round ==
Team 1	Score	Team 2
27 August 2024
Rudar Trbovlje	0–5	Domžale
Arne Tabor 69	0–5	Ilirija 1911
Vrhnika	8–0	Komenda
28 August 2024
Bistrc	0–10	Jadran Dekani
Galeb Ankaran	0–6	Koper
Košana	0–3	Tabor Sežana
Kobilje	0–9	Turnišče
Litija	1–0	Kresnice
Bela Krajina	2–2 (5–4 p)	Svoboda Ljubljana
Jevnica	1–0	Ivančna Gorica
IB 1975 Ljubljana	1–5	Krka
Radomlje	14–0	Zagorje
Veržej	0–9	Mura
Bogojina	3–1	Tromejnik
Križevci	0–6	Čarda Martjanci
Gančani	0–4	Ljutomer
Idrija	1–2	Tolmin
Adria	1–0	Vipava
Črenšovci	0–3	Odranci
Goričanka	0–8	Dokležovje
Hodoš	0–0 (7–6 p)	Ižakovci
Bakovci	3–0 (w/o)	Roma
Tišina	3–2	Cankova
Pušča	1–1 (4–3 p)	Serdica
Cven	0–8	Beltinci
Korte	0–2	Izola
Renče	0–2	Bilje
Panonija	0–11	Polana
Gorica	1–1 (4–2 p)	Primorje
29 August 2024
Nedelica	1–12	Srednja Bistrica
Graničar	5–4	Čentiba
3 September 2024
Gerečja vas	0–3 (w/o)	Aluminij
Makole	1–1 (4–5 p)	Drava Ptuj
Središče	0–7	Videm
Apače (Ptuj)	1–0	Ormož
Tržec	0–9	Zavrč
Preddvor	1–0	Šobec Lesce
4 September 2024
Olimpija Dolga vas	0–8	Nafta 1903
Pesnica	2–2 (4–3 p)	Starše
Limbuš Pekre	1–4	Dobrovce
Rače	3–1	Korotan Prevalje
Marjeta	1–1 (6–5 p)	Peca
MB Tabor	3–2	Jurovski Dol
Zgornja Polskava	0–1	Stojnci
Bukovci	3–3 (3–4 p)	Podvinci
Rogoznica	3–5	Hajdina
Gorišnica	4–3	Boč Poljčane
Pragersko	0–6	Bistrica
Škofja Loka	1–2	Žiri
Polet	7–2	Tržič 2012
Železniki	5–3	Jezero Medvode
Zarica Kranj	1–3	Velesovo Cerklje
10 September 2024
Rogaška	0–2	Dravinja
Laško	2–7	Krško
Mozirje	4–2	Žalec
11 September 2024
Zreče	0–3	Rudar Velenje
Triglav Kranj	4–0	Jesenice
Brežice 1919	8–1	Šmartno 1928

== Second round ==
Team 1	Score	Team 2
17 September 2024
Velesovo Cerklje	2–0	Polet
Dokležovje	2–1	Ljutomer
18 September 2024
Srednja Bistrica	2–4	Turnišče
Graničar	0–15	Nafta 1903
Polana	1–0	Odranci
Litija	0–1	Ilirija 1911
Bela Krajina	2–1	Slovan
Jevnica	0–3	Vrhnika
Bravo	5–0	Krka
Bogojina	0–4	Mura
Bakovci	0–7	Čarda Martjanci
Pušča	0–2	Beltinci
Tišina	1–1 (0–2 p)	Hodoš
Adria	1–3	Tolmin
Rače	2–0	Pesnica
Dobrovce	5–2	MB Tabor
Jadran Dekani	1–8	Koper
Preddvor	5–0	Žiri
Železniki	0–5	Triglav Kranj
24 September 2024
Apače (Ptuj)	0–5	Bistrica
Hajdina	0–4	Aluminij
Videm	2–0	Podvinci
Dob	0–0 (2–4 p)	Radomlje
25 September 2024
Gorica	0–1	Bilje
Marjeta	0–4	Maribor
Stojnci	1–2	Zavrč
Gorišnica	1–5	Drava Ptuj
Domžale	0–3	Olimpija Ljubljana
Izola	0–3	Tabor Sežana
Dravinja	0–3	Celje
Krško Posavje	1–3	Rudar Velenje
Mozirje	0–4	Brežice 1919

== Round of 32 ==
Team 1	Score	Team 2
29 October 2024
Beltinci	4–0	Triglav Kranj
Vrhnika	1–3	Bistrica
30 October 2024
Bilje	1–2 (a.e.t.)	Koper
Rače	3–2	Brežice 1919
Velesovo Cerklje	1–3	Čarda Martjanci
Hodoš	0–8	Celje
Radomlje	1–2	Olimpija Ljubljana
Tolmin	0–2	Bravo
Preddvor	1–2	Maribor
Rudar Velenje	1–2	Aluminij
Mura	9–0	Zavrč
31 October 2024
Videm	0–3	Nafta 1903
Turnišče	0–1	Ilirija 1911
Tabor Sežana	1–0	Drava Ptuj
Dokležovje	2–4	Dobrovce
Bela Krajina	1–0	Polana

== Round of 16 ==
Team 1	Score	Team 2
26 February 2025
Olimpija Ljubljana	3–0	Ilirija 1911
Celje	3–2	Tabor Sežana
Mura	0–1	Koper
4 March 2025
Maribor	2–0	Aluminij
5 March 2025
Čarda Martjanci	1–2	Nafta 1903
Bravo	7–0	Rače
Dobrovce	0–3	Bistrica
6 March 2025
Beltinci	10–0	Bela Krajina

== Quarter-finals ==
1 April 2025	Bistrica	0–2	Koper	Slovenska Bistrica
16:00 UTC+2		Report	T. Juric 70'; Popović 85'	Stadium: Slovenska Bistrica Sports Park; Attendance: 1,200; Referee: Žan Jazbec

2 April 2025	Nafta 1903	2–2 (a.e.t.) (4–5 p)	Bravo	Lendava
16:00 UTC+2	Špoljarić 30'; Lesjak 110'	Report	Poplatnik 56', 91'	Stadium: Lendava Sports Park; Attendance: 400; Referee: Denis Halilović
	Penalties
	Georgievski (penalty missed); Pirtovšek (penalty scored); Pihler (penalty missed); Špoljarić (penalty scored); Szalay (penalty scored); Lesjak (penalty scored); Kálnoki-Kis (penalty missed)		(penalty scored) Poplatnik; (penalty missed) Jakšić; (penalty missed) Nuhanović; (penalty scored) Gidado; (penalty scored) Španring; (penalty scored) Stanković; (penalty scored) Ivanšek

2 April 2025	Maribor	0–1	Celje	Maribor
19:00 UTC+2		Report	Delaurier-Chaubet 83'	Stadium: Ljudski vrt Attendance: 5,500; Referee: Rade Obrenović

3 April 2025	Olimpija Ljubljana	5–2	Beltinci	Ljubljana
16:00 UTC+2	Durdov 1'; Lasickas 19'; Kojić 29', 39'; Aćimović 88'	Report	Jelovica 25'; Štimac 89'	Stadium: Stožice Stadium; Attendance: 1,000; Referee: Mihael Antič

== Semi-finals ==
23 April 2025	Koper	3–0	Bravo	Koper
18:00 UTC+2	El Manssouri 15'; T. Juric 21' (pen.), 40'	Report		Stadium: Bonifika Stadium; Attendance: 1,000; Referee: David Šmajc

24 April 2025	Celje	2–1	Olimpija Ljubljana	Celje
18:00 UTC+2	Matko 28', 83'	Report	Doffo 34'	Stadium: Stadion Z'dežele; Attendance: 4,156; Referee: Bojan Mertik

== Final ==
The final was held on 14 May 2025 at Stožice Stadium in Ljubljana.

14 May 2025
20:00 UTC+2

Koper	0–4	Celje
	Report	Sešlar 26'; Matko 30', 81'; Iosifov 41'

Stožice Stadium, Ljubljana
Attendance: 6,108
Referee: Slavko Vinčić

== See also ==
- 2024–25 Slovenian PrvaLiga
