= 2024–25 NK Olimpija Ljubljana season =

NK Olimpija Ljubljana
2024–25 season
- Manager: Víctor Sánchez
- Stadium: Stožice Stadium
- Slovenian PrvaLiga: 1st
- Slovenian Cup: Semi-finals
- UEFA Conference League: Knockout phase play-offs
- Top goalscorer: League: Florucz (15); All: Florucz (20)
- Highest home attendance: 12,616 v Rijeka (29 Aug 2024, UEFA Conference League)
- Lowest home attendance: 300 v Ilirija 1911 (26 Feb 2025, Cup)
- Biggest win: 5–0 v Rijeka (Home, 29 Aug 2024, UEFA Conference League); 5–0 v Primorje (Home, 1 Feb 2025, PrvaLiga); 5–0 v Radomlje (Home, 17 May 2025, PrvaLiga)
- Biggest defeat: 1–4 v Cerlce Brugge (Home, 29 Aug 2024, UEFA Conference League)

The 2024–25 season is the 20th season in the history of NK Olimpija Ljubljana, and the club's 17th consecutive season in the Slovenian PrvaLiga. In addition to the domestic league, the team is scheduled to participate in the Slovenian Cup and the UEFA Conference League.

== First team ==
=== Management team ===
Position	Staff
Head coach	(Spain) Víctor Sánchez
Assistant coach	(Greece) Giannis Kontoes
Assistant coach	(Spain) Ramiro Muñoz (since 14. 1. 2025)
Goalkeeper coach	(Croatia) Josip Škorić
Athletic coach	(Croatia) Nikola Vidović
Athletic coach	(Croatia) Hrvoje Božičković
Athletic coach	(Croatia) Ivan Zorić
Video analyst	(Croatia) Ivan Damjanović
Physiotherapist	(Slovenia) Žiga Benko
Physiotherapist	(Slovenia) Luka Levec
Physiotherapist	(Croatia) Riva Milić
Economist	(Slovenia) Branko Bučar
Assistant Economist	(Slovenia) Jože Vidergar

Source: NK Olimpija

== Kits ==
Supplier: Puma

Home	Away	Third

== Contracts and transfers ==
=== New contracts ===
The following Olimpija players signed their first or new professional contracts with the club.

Date	No.	Pos.	Player	Contract type	Ref.
First team
28 Jun 2024	9	FW	(Slovenia) Dino Kojić	Contract extension till 2027	
27 Aug 2024	15	DF	(Slovenia) Marko Ristić	Contract extension till 2028	
24 Sep 2024	6	MF	(Nigeria) Peter Agba	Contract extension till 2028	
16 Oct 2024	10	MF	(Austria) Raul Florucz	Contract extension till 2028	
25 Nov 2024	14	DF	(Slovenia) Marcel Ratnik	Contract extension till 2028	
25 Nov 2024	9	FW	(Slovenia) Dino Kojić	Contract extension till 2029	
Academy
1 July 2024	44	RB	(Slovenia) Matej Dvoršak	First professional contract till 2027	
1/28 Aug 2024	–	DF	(Slovenia) Nik Pirečnik	First professional contract till 2027	
1 Aug 2024	–		(Slovenia) Matej Henjak	First professional contract till 2027	
6 Sep 2024	–		(Croatia) Frano Mohorovičić	First professional contract till 2025	

=== Transfers in ===
The following players joined Olimpia permanently and signed professional contracts with the club.

Date	No.	Pos.	Player	Transferred from	Transfer fee	Ref.
First team
21 Jun 2024	88	MF	(Brazil) Thalisson	(Slovenia) Rogaška (PrvaLiga)	Free	
27 Jul 2024	28	W	(Germany) Benjika Caciel	(Germany) Würzburger Kickers (Regionalliga Bayern)	Free	
18 Jul 2024	21	DF	(Spain) Manuel Pedreño	(Spain) SD Tarazona (Primera Federación)	Free	
28 Aug 2024	33	LB	(Spain) Jordi Govea	(Bulgaria) Beroe (efbet Liga)	Undisclosed	
30 Aug 2024	11	W	(Spain) Álex Blanco	(Italy) Reggiana (Serie B)	Undisclosed	
8 Jan 2025	27	FW	(Estonia) Alex Tamm	(Estonia) Nõmme Kalju (Meistriliiga)	Free Transfer	
12 Jan 2025		MF	(Albania) Jurgen Çelhaka	(Poland) Legia Warsaw (Ekstraklasa)	Free Transfer	
Academy
16 Aug 2024	–	FW	(Croatia) Frane Bobanović	(Croatia) Hajduk U-19	Free	
24 Dec 2024	–	LB	(Slovenia) Ajdin Husić	(Slovenia) Brinje Grosuplje	Undisclosed	
18 Jan 2025	–	GK	(Slovenia) Tijan Vasić	(Slovenia) Domžale	Undisclosed	

=== Transfers out ===
Date	No.	Pos.	Player	Transferred to	Fee/Notes	Ref.
First team
25 June 2024	11	MF	(Israel) Sa'ar Fadida	(Israel) Maccabi Bnei Reineh		
25 June 2024	21	MF	(Croatia) Ivan Posavec	(Bosnia and Herzegovina) Zrinjski Mostar	Undisclosed	
30 June 2024	82	FW	(Albania) Redi Kasa	(Albania) Egnatia	Loan return	
10 July 2024	6	DF	(Austria) Mateo Karamatic	(Austria) Hartberg		
13 July 2024	31	GK	(Slovenia) Žan Mauricio	(Slovenia) Nafta		
29 July 2024	10	MF	(Slovenia) Timi Max Elšnik	(Serbia) Red Star Belgrade	€1.5m	
23 October 2024		FW	(Slovenia) Mustafa Nukić	Free Agent		
16 January 2025		DF	(Serbia) Nikola Motika	Free Agent	Contract expired	
30 January 2025		FW	(Germany) Benjika Caciel	(Germany) Rot-Weiß Erfurt	Released	
Academy
12 June 2024		GK	(India) Som Kumar	(India) Kerala Blasters	Free transfer	
30 June 2024		DF	(Slovenia) Tim Matanović	(Slovenia) Rudar Velenje	Free transfer	
1 July 2024		RW	(Slovenia) Marcel Kobal	(Slovenia) Bistrica	Free transfer	
17 July 2024		MF	(Slovenia) Jaša Jelen	(Slovenia) Radomlje	Free transfer	
12 August 2024		FW	(Slovenia) Senad Porić	(Slovenia) Svoboda Ljubljana	Free transfer	
12 August 2024		W	(Slovenia) Nik Balon	(Slovenia) Svoboda Ljubljana	Free transfer	
12 August 2024		MF	(Slovenia) David Uršič	(Slovenia) Svoboda Ljubljana	Free transfer	
8 Januar 2025		CF	(Slovenia) Marcel Petrov	(China) Shanghai Shenhua	Free transfer	

=== Loans out ===
Date	No.	Pos.	Player	Loaned to	Notes	Ref.
First team
15 June 2024	17	FW	(Bosnia and Herzegovina) Admir Bristrić	(Ukraine) Polissya Zhytomyr	End of season (buy option)	
11 July 2024	26	LB	(Slovenia) Vall Janković	(Slovenia) Slovan	End of season	
6 August 2024	44	RB	(Slovenia) Matej Dvoršak	(Slovenia) Slovan	Till 17 Januar 2025	
16 August 2024	29	FW	(Slovenia) Tihomir Maksimović	(Slovenia) Slovan	End of season	
30 August 2024	20	W	(Serbia) Nemanja Motika	(Germany) Greuther Fürth	End of season	

== Friendlies ==
=== Pre-season ===
26 June 2024 Friendly	Olimpija Ljubljana (Slovenia)	2–0	(Romania) Gloria Buzău	Ljubljana
18:00	Pedro Lucas 18'; Boultam 43'	Report		Stadium: Šiška Sports Park

2 July 2024 Friendly	Olimpija Ljubljana (Slovenia)	1–0	(Bosnia and Herzegovina) Sarajevo	Ljubljana
18:00	Dvoršak 80'	Report		Stadium: Kodeljevo Sports Park

6 July 2024 Friendly	Olimpija Ljubljana (Slovenia)	3–1	(Czech Republic) Slovácko	Ljubljana
11:00	Florucz 58'; Motika 80'; Kojić 88'	Report	Kozák 87'	Stadium: Kodeljevo Sports Park

13 July 2024 Friendly	Olimpija Ljubljana (Slovenia)	3–0	(Bulgaria) CSKA 1948 Sofia	Ljubljana
19:00	Sualehe 33'; Motika 64'; Boultam 70'	Report		Stadium: Stožice Stadium

=== Mid-season ===
20 January 2025 Friendly	Śląsk Wrocław (Poland)	0–2	(Slovenia) Olimpija Ljubljana	San Pedro del Pinatar, Spain
16:00 CET		Report	Florucz 59'; Sualehe 63'	Stadium: Pinatar Arena

23 January 2025 Friendly	Olimpija Ljubljana (Slovenia)	6–1	(Spain) Real Murcia Imperial	San Pedro del Pinatar, Spain
11:00 CET	Agba 6' 52'; Boultam 43'; Durdov 66' 73' 78'	Report		Stadium: Pinatar Arena

24 January 2025 Friendly	Olimpija Ljubljana (Slovenia)	0–1	(Ukraine) Kryvbas Kryvyi Rih	San Pedro del Pinatar, Spain
16:00 CET		Report	Kozhushko 82'	Stadium: Pinatar Arena

== Competitions ==
=== Overall record ===
Competition	First match	Last match	Starting round	Final position	Record							
Competition	First match	Last match	Starting round	Final position	Pld	W	D	L	GF	GA	GD	Win %
Slovenian PrvaLiga	19 July 2024	24 May 2025	Matchday 1	Winners	36	21	11	4	63	20	+43	58.33
Slovenian Cup	25 September 2024	24 April 2025	Second round	Semi-finals	5	4	0	1	11	5	+6	80.00
UEFA Conference League	25 July 2024	20 February 2025	Second qualifying round	Knockout phase play-offs	14	8	3	3	21	9	+12	57.14
Total					55	33	14	8	95	34	+61	60.00

Last updated: 1 September 2024
Source: Soccerway

=== Slovenian PrvaLiga ===
==== League table ====
Pos	Team	Pld	W	D	L	GF	GA	GD	Pts	Qualification or relegation
1	Olimpija Ljubljana (C)	36	21	11	4	63	20	+43	74	Qualification for the Champions League first qualifying round
2	Maribor	36	19	10	7	64	32	+32	67	Qualification for the Conference League second qualifying round
3	Koper	36	19	9	8	60	35	+25	66	Qualification for the Conference League first qualifying round
4	Celje	36	17	10	9	76	51	+25	61	Qualification for the Europa League first qualifying round (Note: Celje qualified for the Europa League first qualifying round by winning the 2024–25 Slovenian Football Cup.)
5	Bravo	36	14	13	9	52	44	+8	55	

Source: PrvaLiga
Rules for classification: 1) Points; 2) Head-to-head points; 3) Head-to-head goal difference; 4) Head-to-head goals scored; 5) Goal difference; 6) Goals scored
(C) Champions

==== Results summary ====
Overall								Home						Away					
Pld	W	D	L	GF	GA	GD	Pts	W	D	L	GF	GA	GD	W	D	L	GF	GA	GD
36	21	11	4	63	20	+43	74	12	4	2	40	8	+32	9	7	2	23	12	+11

Last updated: 24 May 2025.
Source: PrvaLiga

==== Results by round ====
Round	1	2	3	4	5	6	7	8	9	10	11	12	13	14	15	16	17	18	19	20	21	23	22	24	25	26	27	28	29	30	31	32	33	34	35	36
Ground	H	A	H	A	H	A	H	A	H	A	H	A	H	A	H	A	H	A	H	A	H	H	A^{1}	A	H	A	H	A	H	A	H	A	H	A	H	A
Result	W	W	W	D	D	D	W	W	D	W	L	W	W	W	D	W	W	D	W	W	W	W	L	L	W	W	W	W	D	D	W	D	L	D	W	D
Position	2	1	1	1	1	4	1	1	1	1	1	1	1	1	1	1	1	1	1	1	1	1	1	1	1	1	1	1	1	1	1	1	1	1	1	1

Updated to match(es) played on 1 September 2024. Source:
A = Away; H = Home; W = Win; D = Draw; L = Loss
Notes:
- ^{1} Matchday 22 (v. Domžale) was postponed due to several illness in the Olimpija team.

==== Matches ====
The match schedule was released on 27 June 2024.

19 July 2024 1	Olimpija Ljubljana	2–0	Primorje	Ljubljana
20:15 CEST (UTC+02:00)	Sualehe (yellow card) 36'; Boultam 45'; Kojić 64'; Agba (yellow card) 62'	Report	Agrelos (yellow card) 40'	Stadium: Stožice Stadium; Attendance: 1,500; Referee: Mateo Tozan (Spodnje Škofije)

28 July 2024 2	Koper	0–1	Olimpija Ljubljana	Koper
20:15 CEST (UTC+02:00)	Ankrah (yellow card) 53'; Mittendorfer (yellow card) 67'; Tomek (yellow card) 77'; Mijailović (yellow card) 92'	Report	Durdov 11'; Ratnik (yellow card) 34'; Thalisson (yellow card) 67'; Florucz (yellow card) 94'	Stadium: Bonifika Stadium; Attendance: 2,300; Referee: Bojan Mertik (Odranci)

5 August 2024 3	Olimpija Ljubljana	2–0	Nafta	Ljubljana
20:15 CEST (UTC+02:00)	Durdov 8' (yellow card) 47'; Ne. Motika 57'	Report	Tojčić (yellow card) 22'; Georgievski (yellow card) 44'; Szalay (yellow card) 46'	Stadium: Stožice Stadium; Attendance: 1,127; Referee: Anže Jerič

11 August 2024 4	Domžale	0–0	Olimpija Ljubljana	Domžale
17:30 CEST (UTC+02:00)	Perc (yellow card) 52'; Krupić (yellow card) 92'	Report	Muhamedbegović (yellow card) 41'; Sualehe (yellow card) 52'; Ristić (yellow card) 60'; Agba (yellow card) 85'; Boultam (yellow card) 86'	Stadium: Domžale Sports Park; Attendance: 2,000; Referee: Matej Jug

18 August 2024 5	Olimpija Ljubljana	2–2	Celje	Ljubljana
20:15 CEST (UTC+02:00)	Pinto 3'; Florucz (yellow card) 34'; Pedro Lucas 51'; Doffo (yellow card) 77'		Edmilson 26' (yellow card) 83'; Menalo 26'	Stadium: Stožice Stadium; Attendance: 3,070; Referee: Alen Borošak

25 August 2024 6	Maribor	1–1	Olimpija Ljubljana	Maribor
17:30 CEST (UTC+02:00)	Karič (yellow card) 25'; Ž. Repas 26'; Milec (yellow card) 30'; Ž. Repas (yellow card) 47'; Iličić (yellow card) 62'; Vidmar (yellow card) 70'	Report	Thalisson (yellow card) 30'; Lasickas 35'; Ristić (yellow card) 88'	Stadium: Ljudski vrt Attendance: 9,650; Referee: David Šmajc

1 September 2024 7	Olimpija Ljubljana	4–0	Mura	Ljubljana
20:15 CEST (UTC+02:00)	Florucz 52' (yellow card) 31'; Pinto 79', 83'; Kojić 87'; Vidovšek (yellow card) 73'	Report	Kurtovič (yellow card) 45'; Maroša (yellow card) 50'; Sadriu (yellow card) 69'	Stadium: Stožice Stadium; Attendance: 3,156; Referee: Mihael Antič

14 September 2024 8	Kalcer Radomlje	0–2	Olimpija Ljubljana	Domžale
20:15 CEST (UTC+02:00)	Gnjatić (yellow card) 8, 71' (yellow-red card); Mamić (yellow card) 74'	Report	Florucz (yellow card) 13' (goal) 53'; Doffo (yellow card) 32'; Boultam 76' (pen.)	Stadium: Domžale Sports Park; Attendance: 500; Referee: Rade Obrenović

21 September 2024 9	Olimpija Ljubljana	1–1	Bravo	Ljubljana
20:15 CEST (UTC+02:00)	Pedro Lucas 3' (pen.); Agba (yellow card) 69'	Report	Španring (yellow card) 17'; Pečar (yellow card) 72'; Poplatnik 80' (yellow card) 93'; Štravs (yellow card) 86'	Stadium: Stožice Stadium; Attendance: 1,500; Referee: David Šmajc

28 September 2024 10	Primorje	0–2	Olimpija Ljubljana	Ajdovščina
15:00 CEST (UTC+02:00)	Fogec (yellow card) 78'; Klemenčič (yellow card) 82'; Bešir (yellow card) 90'	Report	Durdov 12'; Florucz 60'; Boultam (yellow card) 83'	Stadium: Ajdovščina City Stadium; Attendance: 1,300; Referee: Bojan Mertik

6 October 2024 11	Olimpija Ljubljana	0–1	Koper	Ljubljana
20:15 CEST (UTC+02:00)	Pinto (penalty missed) 50'; Sualehe (yellow card) 69'; Pedro Lucas (yellow card) 76'; Silva (yellow card) 77'; Florucz (yellow card) 90'	Report	El Manssouri 16' (yellow card) 90'; D. Jurić (yellow card) 43'; Omladič (yellow card) 53'; Felipe Curcio (yellow card) 68'; Sidibé (yellow card) 76'; T. Juric (yellow card) 90'; Mijailović (yellow card) 93'	Stadium: Stožice Stadium; Attendance: 1,000; Referee: David Šmajc

19 October 2024 12	Nafta	0–1	Olimpija Ljubljana	Lendava
17:30 CEST (UTC+02:00)	Pirtovšek (yellow card) 60'; Lesjak (yellow card) 68'; Hrka (yellow card) 87'	Report	Blanco 8'	Stadium: Lendava Sports Park; Attendance: 1,300; Referee: Alen Bubek

27 October 2024 13	Olimpija Ljubljana	3–0	Domžale	Ljubljana
20:15 CET (UTC+01:00)	Florucz 10' 53'; Ristić (yellow card) 21'; Boultam (yellow card) 35'; Brest (yellow card) 51'; Nwankwo 81' (o.g.)	Report	Nwankwo (yellow card) 47'; Lazarević (yellow card) 88'	Stadium: Stožice Stadium; Attendance: 1,500; Referee: Alen Borošak

2 November 2024 14	Celje	0–1	Olimpija Ljubljana	Celje
15:00 CET (UTC+01:00)	Svetlin (yellow card) 77'; Matko (penalty missed) 99'	Report	Sualehe (yellow card) 25'; Florucz 49' (yellow card) 74'; Doffo (yellow card) 74'; Thalisson (yellow card) 79'; Pedreño (yellow card) 92'	Stadium: Stadion Z'dežele; Attendance: 3,625; Referee: Bojan Mertik

10 November 2024 15	Olimpija Ljubljana	0–0	Maribor	Ljubljana
15:00 CET (UTC+01:00)	Govea (yellow card) 24' (yellow-red card) 65'; Lasickas (yellow card) 90'	Report	Ž. Repas (yellow card) 8'; Iličić (yellow card) 25' (yellow-red card) 90'; Mbina (yellow card) 33'; Krajnc (yellow card) 41'	Stadium: Stožice Stadium; Attendance: 9,865; Referee: Mihael Antič

23 November 2024 16	Mura	0–1	Olimpija Ljubljana	Murska Sobota
15:00 CET (UTC+01:00)	Nuhanović (yellow card) 12'; Vrbanec (yellow card) 41'; Cipot (yellow card) 84'; Sadriu (yellow card) 88'; Bezerra (yellow card) 91'; Kumer Čelik (yellow card) 96'	Report	Sualehe (yellow card) 38'; Brest 67'	Stadium: Fazanerija City Stadium; Attendance: 2,500; Referee: Slavko Vinčić

1 December 2024 17	Olimpija Ljubljana	2–0	Kalcer Radomlje	Ljubljana
17:30 CET (UTC+01:00)	Durdov 38'; Kojić 82'	Report	Barnabas (yellow card) 26'; Gnjatić (yellow card) 36'; Mamić (yellow card) 90'	Stadium: Stožice Stadium; Attendance: 1,000; Referee: Denis Šabaganić

7 December 2024 18	Bravo	1–1	Olimpija Ljubljana	Ljubljana
17:30 CET (UTC+01:00)	Stanković 24' (yellow card) 69'; Jovan (yellow card) 88'; Poplatnik (yellow card) 89'	Report	Florucz 12'	Stadium: Stožice Stadium; Attendance: 900; Referee: Dejan Balažič

2 February 2025 19	Olimpija Ljubljana	5–0	Primorje	Ljubljana
13:00 CET (UTC+01:00)	Tamm 7' (yellow card) 38'; Çelhaka (yellow card) 27'; Silva 41'; Florucz 65'; Blanco 70'; Agba 90'	Report	Dobnikar (yellow card) 1'; Ishaq Rafiu (red card) 30'; Suljanović (yellow card) 33' (yellow-red card) 61'; Stožinič (yellow card) 71'	Stadium: Stožice Stadium; Attendance: 1,000; Referee: Mihael Antič

8 February 2025 20	Koper	1–2	Olimpija Ljubljana	Koper
17:30 CET (UTC+01:00)	Domgjoni (yellow card) 8'; T. Juric 14'; Groznica (yellow card) 48' (yellow-red card) 91'; Tomek (yellow card) 92'	Report	Brest (yellow card) 18'; Çelhaka (yellow card) 47'; Tamm 58'; Florucz 74'	Stadium: Bonifika Stadium; Attendance: 2,300; Referee: Aleksandar Matković

16 February 2025 21	Olimpija Ljubljana	3–0	Nafta	Ljubljana
17:30 CET (UTC+01:00)	Marin 22' (pen.); Durdov 51'; Florucz 77'; Kojić (yellow card) 79'	Report	Hrka (yellow card) 6'; Klausz (yellow card) 60' (yellow-red card) 90'	Stadium: Stožice Stadium; Attendance: 1,600; Referee: Mateo Tozan

2 March 2025 23	Olimpija Ljubljana	2–0	Celje	Ljubljana
15:00 CET (UTC+01:00)	Florucz 40'; Tamm 62'; Doffo (yellow card) 60'	Report	Nieto (yellow card) 22'; Karničnik (yellow card) 34'	Stadium: Stožice Stadium; Attendance: 3,200; Referee: Slavko Vinčić

5 March 2025 22	Domžale	3–1	Olimpija Ljubljana	Domžale
17:30 CET (UTC+01:00)	Šturm 10' 70'; Krupić (yellow card) 72'; Kranjčič 79'; Kambič (yellow card) 80'; Lorber (yellow card) 85'; Štubljar (yellow card) 87'	Report	Pedreño (yellow card) 5'; Florucz (yellow card) 47' (goal) 60'; Boultam (yellow card) 78'	Stadium: Domžale Sports Park; Attendance: 1,000; Referee: Denis Halilović

9 March 2025 24	Maribor	1–0	Olimpija Ljubljana	Maribor
15:00 CET (UTC+01:00)	Tetteh (yellow card) 45'; Soudani 77'; Elmaz (yellow card) 47' (yellow-red card) 81'; Širvys (yellow card) 83'; J. Repas (yellow card) 89'; Rekik (yellow card) 91'; Ojo (yellow card) 96'	Report	Pedreño (yellow card) 45' (yellow-red card) 48'	Stadium: Ljudski vrt Attendance: 9,500; Referee: David Šmajc

12 March 2025 25	Olimpija Ljubljana	2–1	Mura	Ljubljana
17:30 CET (UTC+01:00)	Marin 35'; Tamm 89'	Report	Decoene (yellow card) 45'; Sadriu (yellow card) 49'; Cipot (yellow card) 74' (yellow-red card) 86'; Vrbanec 76'; Raduha (yellow card) 83'	Stadium: Stožice Stadium; Attendance: 1,300; Referee: Denis Halilović

15 March 2025 26	Kalcer Radomlje	0–3	Olimpija Ljubljana	Domžale
20:15 CET (UTC+01:00)	Korun (yellow card) 71'	Report	Ristić 67'; Agba 81'; Brest 94'	Stadium: Domžale Sports Park; Attendance: 600; Referee: Rade Obrenović

30 March 2025 27	Olimpija Ljubljana	3–0	Bravo	Ljubljana
17:30 CEST (UTC+02:00)	Thalisson 5'; Florucz 40' (pen.); Boultam 73'	Report	Atemona (yellow card) 17, 38' (yellow-red card); Baboula (yellow card) 65'; Štravs (yellow card) 67'	Stadium: Stožice Stadium; Attendance: 2,200; Referee: Bojan Mertik

6 April 2025 28	Primorje	0–2	Olimpija Ljubljana	Ajdovščina
15:00 CEST (UTC+02:00)	Klemenčič (yellow card) 42'; Petek (yellow card) 63'; Fogec (yellow card) 79'; Rak (yellow card) 82'	Report	Silva 34'; Lasickas (yellow card) 38'; Brest (yellow card) 47' (goal) 52'; Çelhaka (yellow card) 89'	Stadium: Ajdovščina City Stadium; Attendance: 840; Referee: Martin Matoša

9 April 2025 29	Olimpija Ljubljana	1–1	Koper	Ljubljana
17:00 CEST (UTC+02:00)	Mittendorfer 63' (o.g.); Blanco (yellow card) 65'; Florucz (yellow card) 68'; Çelhaka (yellow card) 68'	Report	Mittendorfer 79' (yellow card) 90'; Sule (yellow card) 20'; Zulić (yellow card) 46'; Sidibé (yellow card) 74'	Stadium: Stožice Stadium; Attendance: 1,200; Referee: David Šmajc

12 April 2025 30	Nafta	1–1	Olimpija Ljubljana	Lendava
17:30 CEST (UTC+02:00)	Mauricio (yellow card) 55'; Kálnoki-Kis (yellow card) 65'; Csóka (yellow card) 75, 93' (yellow-red card); Tojčić (yellow card) 79'; Brkić 86'	Report	Boultam 56' (pen.)	Stadium: Lendava Sports Park; Attendance: 800; Referee: Alen Bubek

19 April 2025 31	Olimpija Ljubljana	2–0	Domžale	Ljubljana
20:15 CEST (UTC+02:00)	Muhamedbegović 49'; Florucz 74'; Silva (yellow card) 93'	Report	Perc (yellow card) 39'; Tolić (yellow card) 64'; Lazarević (yellow card) 93'	Stadium: Stožice Stadium; Attendance: 2,000; Referee: Dejan Balažič

27 April 2025 32	Celje	3–3	Olimpija Ljubljana	Celje
17:30 CEST (UTC+02:00)	Kvesić (yellow card) 38'; Nieto (yellow card) 38'; Iosifov 43'; Svetlin (yellow card) 68'; Sešlar 70' (pen.); Matko 82' (yellow card) 83'; Prutsev (yellow card) 88, 92' (yellow-red card)	Report	Kojić 6'; Doffo (yellow card) 38'; Durdov (yellow card) 38'; Sualehe 58' (pen.) (yellow card) 64'; Florucz (yellow card) 90' (goal) 95'	Stadium: Stadion Z'dežele; Attendance: 3,270; Referee: Mihael Antič

3 May 2025 33	Olimpija Ljubljana	1–2	Maribor	Ljubljana
20:15 CEST (UTC+02:00)	Kojić 8'; Tamm (yellow card) 62'; Florucz (yellow card) 66'	Report	Çelhaka 15' (o.g.); Rekik (yellow card) 20'; Meriluoto 53'; J. Repas (yellow card) 50'; Reghba (yellow card) 84'; Jug (yellow card) 87'	Stadium: Stožice Stadium; Attendance: 9,000; Referee: Alen Bubek

10 May 2025 34	Mura	1–1	Olimpija Ljubljana	Murska Sobota
20:15 CET CEST (UTC+02:00)	Cipot (yellow card) 17, 35' (yellow-red card); Vizinger 18' (yellow card) 35'; Sana (yellow card) 55, 91' (yellow-red card); Sadriu (yellow card) 60'; Kurtovič (yellow card) 77'; Maroša (yellow card) 91'; Kumer Čelik (yellow card) 93'	Report	Tamm 13'; Thalisson (yellow card) 74'; Doffo (yellow card) 91'	Stadium: Fazanerija City Stadium; Attendance: 1,776; Referee: Denis Halilović

17 May 2025 35	Olimpija Ljubljana	5–0	Kalcer Radomlje	Ljubljana
15:00 CET CEST (UTC+02:00)	Ratnik 14' 71'; Tamm 28'; Boultam (yellow card) 51'; Kojić 61'; Pedreño 84' (pen.)	Report	Ljutić (yellow card) 12, 71' (yellow-red card); Vukasović (yellow card) 27'; Kukovec (yellow card) 29'; Gnjatić (yellow card) 57'	Stadium: Stožice Stadium; Attendance: 4,348; Referee: Martin Matoša

24 May 2025 36	Bravo	0–0	Olimpija Ljubljana	Ljubljana
15:00 CET CEST (UTC+02:00)	Španring (yellow card) 16'	Report		Stadium: Stožice Stadium; Attendance: 2,650; Referee: Mateo Tozan

=== Slovenian Cup ===
25 September 2024 Second round	Domžale	0–3	Olimpija Ljubljana	Domžale
18:00 CEST (UTC+02:00)	Grajfoner (yellow card) 12' (yellow-red card) 34'; Šturm (yellow card) 60'	Report	Krstovski 36' (o.g.); Florucz 42' 70'	Stadium: Domžale Sports Park; Attendance: 700; Referee: Amel Begić

30 October 2024 Round of 32	Kalcer Radomlje	1–2	Olimpija Ljubljana	Radomlje
14:00 CET (UTC+01:00)	Štorman 43'; Vučenović (yellow card) 56'; Korun (yellow card) 64'; Kompan Breznik (yellow card) 78'; Kukovec (yellow card) 85'	Report	Lasickas 12'; Boultam (yellow card) 19'; Sualehe 39'	Stadium: Radomlje Sports Park; Attendance: 850; Referee: Dejan Balažič

26 February 2025 Round of 16	Olimpija Ljubljana	3–0	Ilirija 1911	Ljubljana
14:30 CET (UTC+01:00)	Çelhaka 7'; Blanco 44'; Marin 52'; Brest (yellow card) 78'	Report		Stadium: Kodeljevo Sports Park; Attendance: 300; Referee: Božo Kondić

3 April 2025 Quarter-finals	Olimpija Ljubljana	5–2	Beltinci Klima Tratnjek	Ljubljana
16:00 CEST (UTC+02:00)	Durdov 1'; Lasickas 19'; Kojić 29' 39'; Aćimović 88'	Report	Igwe (yellow card) 13'; Jelovica 25'; Štimac 89'	Stadium: Stožice Stadium; Attendance: 1,000; Referee: Mihael Antič

24 April 2025 Semi-finals	Celje	2–1	Olimpija Ljubljana	Celje
18:00 CEST (UTC+02:00)	Matko 28' 83' (yellow card) 49'; Nemanič (yellow card) 44'; Karničnik (yellow card) 88'; Svetlin (yellow card) 96'	Report	Florucz (yellow card) 17'; Sualehe (yellow card) 20'; Doffo 34' (yellow card) 91'; Çelhaka (yellow card) 57'; Vidovšek (yellow card) 83'; Silva (yellow card) 93'	Stadium: Stadion Z'dežele; Attendance: 4,156; Referee: Bojan Mertik

=== UEFA Conference League ===
==== Second qualifying round ====
25 July 2024 Second leg	Olimpija Ljubljana (Slovenia)	2–0	(Ukraine) Polissya Zhytomyr	Ljubljana
19:00 UTC+2	Jorge Silva (yellow card) 31'; Kojić (yellow card) 33'; Florucz 56'; Pinto 90+2'	Report	Sarapiy (yellow card) 25'; Budkivskyi (yellow card) 31'; Maisuradze (yellow card) 49'; Ashur (yellow card) 77'; Krushynskyi (yellow card) 87'	Stadium: Stožice Stadium; Attendance: 3,572; Referee: Javier Alberola Rojas (Spain)

1 August 2024 First leg	Polissya Zhytomyr (Ukraine)	1–2 (1–4 agg.)	(Slovenia) Olimpija Ljubljana	Gliwice, Poland
18:00 UTC+2	Kushnirenko 1'; Diachenko (yellow card) 42'; Talles Costa (yellow card) 85'; Mykhaylichenko (yellow card) 86'	Report	Florucz 11' (yellow card) 62'; Durdov 90+3'	Stadium: Piotr Wieczorek Municipal Stadium; Attendance: 1,296; Referee: Miloš Milanović (Serbia)

==== Third qualifying round ====
8 August 2024 First leg	Olimpija Ljubljana (Slovenia)	3–0	(Moldova) Sheriff Tiraspol	Ljubljana
19:00 UTC+2	Muhamedbegović (yellow card) 14'; Pedro Lucas 45+4' (pen.); Doffo 65'; Sualehe 84'	Report	Lins (yellow card) 45+2'	Stadium: Stožice Stadium; Attendance: 3,797; Referee: Vasilis Fotias (Greece)

15 August 2024 Second leg	Sheriff Tiraspol (Moldova)	0–1 (0–4 agg.)	(Slovenia) Olimpija Ljubljana	Tiraspol, Moldova
20:00 UTC+3	Kyabou (yellow card) 43'; Mija (yellow card) 82'; Ademo (yellow card) 90+2'	Report	Motika 87' (pen.)	Stadium: Sheriff Stadium; Attendance: 2,422; Referee: Maurizio Mariani (Italy)

==== Play-off round ====
22 August 2024 First leg	Rijeka (Croatia)	1–1	(Slovenia) Olimpija Ljubljana	Rijeka, Croatia
20:00 UTC+3	Ivanović 33'; Pašalić (yellow card) 49'; Đalović (yellow card) 72'; Zlomislić (yellow card) 75'; Ante Majstorović (yellow card) 76'; Toni Fruk (yellow card) 83'	Report	Doffo (yellow card) 34'; Ratnik (yellow card) 34'; Sualehe (yellow card) 35'; Pedro Lucas 76' (pen.); Thalisson (yellow card) 78'	Stadium: Stadion Rujevica; Attendance: 6,487; Referee: César Soto Grado (Spain)

29 August 2024 Second leg	Olimpija Ljubljana (Slovenia)	5–0 (6–1 agg.)	(Croatia) Rijeka	Ljubljana, Slovenia
19:00 CEST (UTC+02:00)	Florucz 2' (yellow card) 54'; Thalisson (yellow card) 10' (goal) 13', 45'; Kojić 35'; Lucas 47'	Report	Janković (yellow card) 8'; Radeljić (yellow card) 38'; Petrovič (yellow card) 52'	Stadium: Stožice; Attendance: 12,616; Referee: Urs Schnyder (Switzerland)

==== League phase ====
Pos	Team	Pld	W	D	L	GF	GA	GD	Pts	Qualification
12	(Cyprus Football Association) Pafos	6	3	1	2	11	7	+4	10	Advance to knockout phase play-offs (seeded)
13	(Hellenic Football Federation) Panathinaikos	6	3	1	2	10	7	+3	10	Advance to knockout phase play-offs (seeded)
14	(Football Association of Slovenia) Olimpija Ljubljana	6	3	1	2	7	6	+1	10	Advance to knockout phase play-offs (seeded)
15	(Royal Spanish Football Federation) Real Betis	6	3	1	2	6	5	+1	10	Advance to knockout phase play-offs (seeded)
16	(German Football Association) 1. FC Heidenheim	6	3	1	2	7	7	0	10	Advance to knockout phase play-offs (seeded)

Source: UEFA
Rules for classification: League phase tiebreakers

Round	1	2	3	4	5	6
Ground	A	H	A	H	H	A
Result	L	W	W	W	L	D
Position	22	17	10	7	14	14
Points	0	3	6	9	9	10

Updated to match(es) played on 3 October 2024. Source: UEFA
A = Away; H = Home; W = Win; D = Draw; L = Loss

3 October 2024 1	1. FC Heidenheim (Germany)	2–1	(Slovenia) Olimpija Ljubljana	Heidenheim, Germany
18:45 CEST (UTC+2)	Beck 6'; Wanner (penalty missed) 83', 83', (yellow card) 84'; Scienza (yellow card) 88'; Kerber (yellow card) 90+5'	Report	Thalisson (yellow card) 37'; Agba (yellow card) 65'; Blanco 77'	Stadium: Voith-Arena; Attendance: 12,887; Referee: Enea Jorgji (Albania)

24 October 2024 2	Olimpija Ljubljana (Slovenia)	2–0	(Austria) LASK	Ljubljana
21:00 CEST (UTC+2)	Blanco 14'; Sualehe (yellow card) 48'; Boultam (yellow card) 72'; Pedro Lucas 80' (yellow card) 81'; Muhamedbegović (yellow card) 90'	Report	Bogarde (yellow card) 73'; Flecker (yellow card) 94'	Stadium: Stožice Stadium; Attendance: 6,558; Referee: Daniele Chiffi (Italy)

7 November 2024 3	HJK (Finland)	0–2	(Slovenia) Olimpija Ljubljana	Helsinki, Finland
18:45 (19:45 UTC+2)		Report	Brest 57'; Agba 68'	Stadium: Bolt Arena; Attendance: 6,394; Referee: Robert Jones (England)

28 November 2024 4	Olimpija Ljubljana (Slovenia)	1–0	(Northern Ireland) Larne	Ljubljana
21:00 CET (UTC+01:00)	Silva (yellow card) 35'; Durdov 67'	Report	Graham (yellow card) 35' (yellow-red card) 81'; Ferguson (yellow card) 57'	Stadium: Stožice Stadium; Attendance: 4,954; Referee: Sander van der Eijk (Netherlands)

12 December 2024 5	Olimpija Ljubljana (Slovenia)	1–4	(Belgium) Cercle Brugge	Ljubljana
18:45 CET (UTC+01:00)	Blanco 5'; Agba (yellow card) 27'; Škorić (yellow card) 45+4'; Thalisson (red card) 48'; Sánchez (yellow card) 50'; Sualehe (yellow card) 53'; Ristić (yellow card) 65'; Doffo (yellow card) 90+4'	Report	Olaigbe 2', 81'; Felipe Augusto (yellow card) 8' (goal) 24'; Diakité (yellow card) 64'; Denkey 72'	Stadium: Stožice Stadium; Attendance: 5,646; Referee: Adam Ladebäck (Sweden)

19 December 2024 6	Jagiellonia Białystok (Poland)	0–0	(Slovenia) Olimpija Ljubljana	Białystok, Poland
21:00	Sáček (yellow card) 32'; Pululu (yellow card) 38'; Nguiamba (yellow card) 82'	Report	Brest (yellow card) 17'; Blanco (yellow card) 28'; Silva (yellow card) 85'; Boultam (yellow card) 89'	Stadium: Białystok Municipal Stadium; Attendance: 14,329; Referee: Luis Godinho (Portugal)

==== Knockout phase ====
===== Knockout phase play-offs =====
The draw for the knockout phase play-offs was held on 20 December 2024.

13 February 2025 First leg	Borac Banja Luka (Bosnia and Herzegovina)	1–0	(Slovenia) NK Olimpija Ljubljana	Banja Luka, Bosnia and Herzegovina
21:00 CET (UTC+01:00)	Kvržić (yellow card) 32'; Despotović (penalty missed) 86'; Ogrinec 90+1'	Report	Florucz (yellow card) 16' (yellow-red card) 52'; Vidovšek (yellow card) 78'; Sánchez (yellow card) 84'; Lubej Fink (yellow card) 87'	Stadium: Banja Luka City Stadium; Attendance: 8,406; Referee: Radu Petrescu (Romania)

20 February 2025 Second leg	Olimpija Ljubljana (Slovenia)	0–0 (0–1 agg.)	(Bosnia and Herzegovina) Borac Banja Luka	Ljubljana
	Blanco (penalty missed) 7'; Sualehe (yellow card) 84'; Giannis Kontoes (yellow card) 90+8'; Pedreño (yellow card) 90+9'; Lubej Fink (yellow card) 90+14'	Report	Meijers (yellow card) 7'; Kulašin (yellow card) 53'; Ogrinec (yellow card) 59'; Herrera (yellow card) 76'; Kvržić (yellow card) 90+2'; Boban Nikolov (yellow card) 80'; Mladen Žižović (yellow card) 90+18' (yellow-red card) 90+19'; Subić (yellow card) 90+18'	Stadium: Stožice Stadium; Attendance: 12,169; Referee: Manfredas Lukjančukas (Lithuania)

== Player seasonal records ==
Updated 29 May 2025. Competitive matches only.

=== Goals ===
Rank	Name	League	Europe	Cup	Total
1	(Austria) Raul Florucz	15	3	2	20
2	(Slovenia) Dino Kojić	6	3	2	11
3	(Croatia) Ivan Durdov	5	4	1	10
4	(Spain) Álex Blanco	2	4	1	7
5	(Brazil) Pedro Lucas	2	4	–	6
5	(Estonia) Alex Tamm	6	–	–	6
7	(Lithuania) Justas Lasickas	1	2	2	5
8	(Portugal) Diogo Pinto	3	1	–	4
8	(Slovenia) Marko Brest	3	1	–	4
8	(Netherlands) Reda Boultam	4	–	–	4
12	(Brazil) Thalisson	1	2	–	3
12	(Portugal) David Sualehe	1	1	1	3
12	(Nigeria) Peter Agba	2	1	–	3
12	(Croatia) Antonio Marin	2	–	1	3
15	(Serbia) Nemanja Motika	1	1	–	2
15	(Argentina) Agustín Doffo	–	1	1	2
15	(Slovenia) Marcel Ratnik	2	–	–	2
15	(Portugal) Jorge Silva	2	–	–	2
19	(Austria) Ahmet Muhamedbegovic	1	–	–	1
19	(Spain) Manuel Pedreño	1	–	–	1
19	(Slovenia) Marko Ristić	1	–	–	1
19	(Albania) Jurgen Çelhaka	–	–	1	1
19	(Slovenia) Mateo Aćimović	–	–	1	1

Source: Competitive matches
