= 2024–25 FC Koper season =

Koper
2024–25 season
- Chairman: Ante Guberac
- Head coach: (Slovenia) Slaviša Stojanovič
- Stadium: Bonifika Stadium
- Slovenian PrvaLiga: 3rd
- Slovenian Football Cup: Runners Up
Home colours	Away colours	Third colours

This season will be Koper 104th season in the clubs history. This season the club will participate in the following competitions: Slovenian PrvaLiga, Slovenian Football Cup.

== Current squad ==
As of 24 July 2025

Note: Flags indicate national team as defined under FIFA eligibility rules; some limited exceptions apply. Players may hold more than one non-FIFA nationality.

No.	Pos.	Nation	Player
2	DF	LBR	Mark Pabai
3	DF	BRA	Felipe Curcio
4	DF	FRA	Charles Divialle-Corbière
6	MF	CRO	Fran Tomek
8	MF	KOS	Toni Domgjoni
9	FW	AUS	Tomi Juric
10	MF	FRA	Omar El Manssouri
11	FW	AUS	Deni Jurić
15	DF	SLO	Maj Mittendorfer
17	MF	CRO	Petar Petriško
18	MF	SLO	Aljaž Zalaznik
21	MF	SLO	Nik Omladič
22	DF	BIH	Jasmin Čeliković
23	MF	SLO	Sandro Jovanović

No.	Pos.	Nation	Player
25	GK	SLO	Tadej Bonaca
28	DF	SLO	Dominik Ivkič
31	GK	SLO	Metod Jurhar
32	DF	SRB	Veljko Mijailović
35	DF	NGR	Victor Ehibe
39	MF	SLO	Damjan Bohar
45	MF	FRA	Isaac Matondo
48	DF	FRA	Ahmed Sidibé
49	MF	SLO	Timotej Brkić
69	DF	FRA	Brice Negouai
72	MF	SLO	Josip Iličić
73	GK	SLO	Luka Baš
80	MF	BEL	Jean-Pierre Longonda
99	MF	FRA	Kamil Manseri

== Non-competitive ==
=== Club Friendlies ===
22 June 2024 Friendly	Primorje (Slovenia)	0-2	(Slovenia) Koper	Ajdovščina
18:00		Report	Durmisi 40' 45+2'	Stadium: Ajdovščina Stadium

27 June 2024 Friendly	Koper (Slovenia)	4-3	(Slovenia) Grosuplje	Koper
18:00	Wisdom Aondowase Sule 17' 27'; Petar Petriško 68' 77'	Report	Marcel Kene 20'; Nejc Mocnik 67'; Perfil de iakc 90'	Stadium: Bonifika Stadium

29 June 2024 Friendly	Rijeka (Croatia)	1-0	(Slovenia) Koper	Rijeka
19:00	Smolčić 2'	Report		Stadium: Stadion Rujevica

13 July 2024 Friendly	Austria Klagenfurt	1-1	(Slovenia) Koper	Klagenfurt am Wörthersee
17:00	Toshevski 33'	Report	Gabriel Groznica 6'	Stadium: Wörthersee Stadion

14 July 2024 Friendly	Koper (Slovenia)	2-2	(Croatia) Istra 1961	Koper
19:00	Omladič 62'; Andraž Ruedl 76'	Report	Marešić 59'; Filet 78'	Stadium: Bonifika Stadium

== Competitive ==
=== League Table ===
Pos	Team	Pld	W	D	L	GF	GA	GD	Pts	Qualification or relegation
1	Olimpija Ljubljana (C)	36	21	11	4	63	20	+43	74	Qualification for the Champions League first qualifying round
2	Maribor	36	19	10	7	64	32	+32	67	Qualification for the Conference League second qualifying round
3	Koper	36	19	9	8	60	35	+25	66	Qualification for the Conference League first qualifying round
4	Celje	36	17	10	9	76	51	+25	61	Qualification for the Europa League first qualifying round (Note: Celje qualified for the Europa League first qualifying round by winning the 2024–25 Slovenian Football Cup.)
5	Bravo	36	14	13	9	52	44	+8	55	

Source: PrvaLiga
Rules for classification: 1) Points; 2) Head-to-head points; 3) Head-to-head goal difference; 4) Head-to-head goals scored; 5) Goal difference; 6) Goals scored
(C) Champions

==== Results summary ====
Overall								Home						Away					
Pld	W	D	L	GF	GA	GD	Pts	W	D	L	GF	GA	GD	W	D	L	GF	GA	GD
36	19	9	8	60	35	+25	66	8	7	3	27	14	+13	11	2	5	33	21	+12

Last updated: 25 May 2025.
Source: soccerway

===== Results by round =====
Round	1	2	3	4	5
Ground	A	H	A	A	H
Result	W	L	W	L	W
Position	4	7	3	6	4

Updated to match(es) played on 17 August 2024. Source: worldfootball
A = Away; H = Home; W = Win; D = Draw; L = Loss

==== Matches ====
20 July 2024 1	Radomlje	0-1	Koper	Domžale
17:30 CEST	Rok Štorman (yellow card) 52'; Gnjatić (yellow card) 57'; Velić (yellow card) 69'	Report	Felipe Curcio 75'; Maj Mittendorfer (yellow card) 76'	Stadium: Domžale Sports Park; Attendance: 250; Referee: (Slovenia) Damjan Novarlić

28 July 2024 2	Koper	0-1	Olimpija Ljubljana	Koper
20:15 CEST	Ahmed Awua Ankrah (yellow card) 53'; Maj Mittendorfer (yellow card) 67'; Fran Tomek (yellow card) 77'; Veljko Mijailović (yellow card) 90+2'	Report	Durdov 11'; Ratnik (yellow card) 34'; Thalisson (yellow card) 67'; Florucz (yellow card) 90+5'	Stadium: Bonifika Stadium; Attendance: 2,300; Referee: (Slovenia) Bojan Mertik

3 August 2024 3	Primorje	0-2	Koper	Nova Gorica
17:30 CEST	Edvin Suljanović (yellow card) 48'	Report	Felipe Curcio (yellow card) 18' (goal) 45+1'; Omladič (yellow card) 27'; Ahmed Sidibé (yellow card) 51'; Petar Petriško 78'; Ahmed Awua Ankrah (yellow card) 88'	Stadium: Nova Gorica Sports Park; Attendance: 500; Referee: (Slovenia) Žan Jazbec

12 August 2024 4	Bravo	1-0	Koper	Ljubljana
20:15 CEST	Poplatnik (yellow card) 86'; Burić 90+2' (o.g.)	Report	Jovanović (yellow card) 23'	Stadium: Stožice Stadium; Referee: (Slovenia) David Šmajc

17 August 2024 5	Koper	3-0	Nafta 1903	Koper
20:15 CEST	Di Mateo Lovrić (yellow card) 5'; Veljko Mijailović 51'; Petar Petriško 55'; Omladič 77'	Report		Stadium: Bonifika Stadium; Attendance: 500; Referee: (Slovenia) Aleksandar Matković

24 August 2024 6	Domžale	0-3	Koper	Domžale
20:15 CEST	Morré Timothe Makadji (red card) 57'; Offenbacher (yellow card) 84'; Abraham Nwankwo (yellow card) 85'	Report	Wisdom Sule (yellow card) 30'; Petar Petriško 43' (pen.) 61' (pen.); Maj Mittendorfer 51'; Di Mateo Lovrić (yellow card) 88'	Stadium: Domžale Sports Park; Attendance: 600; Referee: (Slovenia) Martin Matoša
