= Leard Sadriu =

Kosovan footballer (born 2001)

Personal information
- Date of birth: 22 April 2001 (age 25)
- Place of birth: Ferizaj, Kosovo under UN administration
- Height: 1.86 m (6 ft 1 in)
- Position: Centre-back

Team information
- Current team: Argeș Piteşti
- Number: 3

Youth career
- –2017: Ferizaj
- 2017–2018: Shkëndija

Senior career*
Years	Team	Apps	(Gls)
2018–2022	Shkëndija	17	(0)
2021–2022	→ Skënderbeu (loan)	51	(1)
2022–2025	Mura	71	(1)
2025–	Argeș Piteşti	48	(3)

International career^{‡}
2017	Kosovo U17	2	(0)
2018–2019	Kosovo U19	6	(0)
2020–2022	Kosovo U21	15	(1)
2022–	Kosovo	2	(0)
- * Club domestic league appearances and goals as of 6 November 2026 ‡ National team caps and goals as of 10 October 2025

Leard Sadriu (born 22 April 2001) is a Kosovan professional footballer who plays as a centre-back for Liga I club Argeș Piteşti and the Kosovo national team.

== Club career ==
=== Shkëndija ===
On 14 December 2017, Sadriu signed a three-year contract with Macedonian First League club Shkëndija. On 25 January 2018, the club confirmed that Sadriu's transfer was permanent. His debut with Shkëndija came on 7 April in a 5–0 home win against Renova after coming on as a substitute in place of Egzon Bejtulai.

==== Loan at Skënderbeu Korçë ====
On 11 January 2021, Sadriu joined Kategoria Superiore side Skënderbeu Korçë, on a season-long loan. His debut with Skënderbeu Korçë came five days later in a 2–1 home defeat against Partizani Tirana after being named in the starting line-up.

=== Mura ===
On 6 September 2022, Sadriu signed a three-year contract with Slovenian PrvaLiga side Mura.

=== FC Argeş Piteşti ===
On 29 May 2025, Sadriu signed a deal with Romanian Liga I club Argeş Piteşti.

== International career ==
From 2017 to 2022, Sadriu represented Kosovo at the under-17, under-19, and under-21 youth international levels, and made a total of 21 competitive appearances for all three teams. On 30 May 2022, he received a call-up from the senior team for training session before the 2022–23 UEFA Nations League matches against Cyprus, Greece and Northern Ireland, but did not make the final squad. His debut with the senior team came on 16 November 2022 in a friendly match against Armenia, after being named in the starting line-up and playing the entire match.

== Career statistics ==
=== Club ===
As of match played 6 November 2026

Club	Season	League			National cup (Note: Includes Macedonian Cup, Albanian Cup, Slovenian Cup, Cupa României)		Europe		Other		Total	
Club	Season	Division	Apps	Goals	Apps	Goals	Apps	Goals	Apps	Goals	Apps	Goals
Shkëndija	2017–18	Macedonian First League	2	0	–		–		–		2	0
Shkëndija	2018–19	Macedonian First League	7	0	0	0	0	0	–		7	0
Shkëndija	2019–20	Macedonian First League	5	0	0	0	0	0	–		5	0
Shkëndija	2020–21	Macedonian First League	2	0	0	0	0	0	–		2	0
Shkëndija	2022–23	Macedonian First League	1	0	–		2 (Note: Appearances in UEFA Conference League)	0	–		3	0
Shkëndija	Total		17	0	0	0	2	0	–		19	0
Skënderbeu (loan)	2020–21	Kategoria Superiore	18	1	3	0	–		–		21	1
Skënderbeu (loan)	2021–22	Kategoria Superiore	33	0	3	0	–		–		36	0
Skënderbeu (loan)	Total		51	1	6	0	–		–		57	1
Mura	2022–23	Slovenian PrvaLiga	12	0	0	0	–		–		12	0
Mura	2023–24	Slovenian PrvaLiga	28	0	3	0	–		–		31	0
Mura	2024–25	Slovenian PrvaLiga	31	1	2	0	–		–		33	1
Mura	Total		71	1	5	0	–		–		76	1
Argeș Pitești	2025–26	Liga I	36	3	5	0	–		–		41	3
Argeș Pitești	2026–27	Liga I	12	0	1	0	–		–		13	0
Argeș Pitești	Total		48	3	6	0	–		–		54	3
Career total			187	5	17	0	2	0	–		206	5

=== International ===
As of match played 10 October 2025

Appearances and goals by national team and year
National team	Year	Apps	Goals
Kosovo
Kosovo	2022	1	0
Kosovo	2023	0	0
Kosovo	2024	0	0
Kosovo	2025	1	0
Total		2	0

== Honours ==
Shkëndija

- Macedonian First League: 2017–18, 2018–19, 2020–21
- Macedonian Cup: 2017–18

Skënderbeu

- Albanian Cup runner-up: 2020–21
