= Diogo Pinto (footballer, born 1999) =

Portuguese footballer (born 1999)

Personal information
- Full name: Diogo Costa Pinto
- Date of birth: 29 June 1999 (age 27)
- Place of birth: Tomar, Portugal
- Height: 1.75 m (5 ft 9 in)
- Positions: Attacking midfielder; winger

Team information
- Current team: Dinamo București
- Number: 8

Youth career
- 2007–2008: União Tomar
- 2008–2014: Sporting CP
- 2014–2015: União Leiria
- 2015–2018: Benfica

Senior career*
Years	Team	Apps	(Gls)
2018–2019	Benfica U23	37	(13)
2019–2020	Benfica B	4	(0)
2020–2021	Ascoli	8	(1)
2020–2021	→ Potenza (loan)	2	(0)
2021	→ Vilafranquense (loan)	10	(1)
2021–2022	Estrela Amadora	29	(13)
2022–2023	Casa Pia	18	(0)
2023–2026	Olimpija Ljubljana	53	(6)
2026–	Dinamo București	9	(2)

International career
2019	Portugal U20	1	(0)
- * Club domestic league appearances and goals as of 6 November 2026

Diogo Costa Pinto (born 29 June 1999) is a Portuguese professional footballer who plays as an attacking midfielder or a winger for Liga I club Dinamo București.

== Career ==
Born in Tomar, Pinto made his professional debut with Benfica B in a 4–0 away loss to Vilafranquense in LigaPro on 18 August 2019.

On 13 January 2020, he was acquired by Ascoli, before joining Serie C club Potenza on loan on 5 October 2020.

On 26 January 2021, Pinto was loaned to Vilafranquense. On 7 July 2021, he signed a two-year contract with Estrela da Amadora.

On 26 June 2022, recently-promoted Primeira Liga side Casa Pia announced the signing of Pinto on a two-year contract. He made his Primeira Liga debut on 7 August, coming off the bench for Takahiro Kunimoto in the 72nd minute of a 0–0 draw away at Santa Clara.

On 18 August 2023, Slovenian champions Olimpija Ljubljana announced the signing of Pinto on a three-year contract. On 23 July 2025, Pinto scored the fastest hat-trick in Olimpija's history in a Conference League match against Inter Club d'Escaldes, after scoring three goals in ten minutes.

== Career statistics ==
As of 6 November 2026

Appearances and goals by club, season and competition
Club	Season	League			National cup (Note: Includes Taça Revelação, Coppa Italia, Taça de Portugal, Slovenian Cup, Cupa României)		Europe		Other		Total	
Club	Season	Division	Apps	Goals	Apps	Goals	Apps	Goals	Apps	Goals	Apps	Goals
Benfica U23	2018–19	Liga Revelação	35	13	2	5	—		—		37	18
Benfica U23	2019–20	Liga Revelação	2	0	—		—		—		2	0
Benfica U23	Total		37	13	2	5	—		—		39	18
Benfica B	2019–20	LigaPro	4	0	—		—		—		4	0
Ascoli	2019–20	Serie B	8	1	—		—		—		8	1
Ascoli	2020–21	Serie B	0	0	1	0	—		—		1	0
Ascoli	Total		8	1	1	0	—		—		9	1
Potenza (loan)	2020–21	Serie C	2	0	—		—		—		2	0
Vilafranquense (loan)	2020–21	Liga Portugal 2	10	1	—		—		—		10	1
Estrela Amadora	2021–22	Liga Portugal 2	29	13	3	1	—		2 (Note: Appearances in Taça da Liga)	0	34	14
Casa Pia	2022–23	Primeira Liga	17	0	3	1	—		3	0	23	1
Casa Pia	2023–24	Primeira Liga	1	0	—		—		2	1	30	1
Casa Pia	Total		18	0	3	1	—		5	1	26	2
Olimpija Ljubljana	2023–24	Slovenian PrvaLiga	17	0	2	1	5 (Note: Two appearances and one goal in UEFA Europa League, three appearances in UEFA Conference League)	1	—		24	2
Olimpija Ljubljana	2024–25	Slovenian PrvaLiga	19	3	4	0	9 (Note: Appearances in UEFA Conference League)	1	—		32	4
Olimpija Ljubljana	2025–26	Slovenian PrvaLiga	17	3	2	0	7 (Note: Two appearances and one goal in UEFA Champions League, five appearances and four goals in UEFA Conference League)	5	—		26	8
Olimpija Ljubljana	Total		53	6	8	1	21	7	—		82	14
Dinamo București	2026–27	Liga I	9	2	2	3	—		—		11	5
Career total			170	36	19	11	21	7	5	1	215	55

== Honours ==
Olimpija Ljubljana

- Slovenian PrvaLiga: 2024–25

Individual

- Liga Portugal 2 Team of the Season: 2021–22
- Liga Portugal 2 Goal of the Month: January 2022
