= Pedreño =

Pedreño is a Spanish surname. Notable people with the surname include:

- Manuel Pedreño (born 2000), Spanish footballer
- Óscar Plano (born 1991), Spanish footballer, full name Óscar Plano Pedreño
