= Pedro Lucas (footballer, born 1998) =

Brazilian footballer (born 1998)

Personal information
- Full name: Pedro Lucas Schwaizer
- Date of birth: 5 September 1998 (age 28)
- Place of birth: Vale Real, Brazil
- Height: 1.82 m (6 ft 0 in)
- Position: Forward

Youth career
- 2008–2019: Internacional

Senior career*
Years	Team	Apps	(Gls)
2019–2021	Internacional	12	(1)
2020	→ Figueirense (loan)	14	(3)
2020–2021	→ CSA (loan)	24	(5)
2021	→ Mirassol (loan)	14	(3)
2021–2023	Mafra	61	(9)
2023–2026	Olimpija Ljubljana	55	(9)
- * Club domestic league appearances and goals as of 16 June 2026

Pedro Lucas Schwaizer (born 5 September 1998) is a Brazilian professional footballer who plays as a forward.

== Club career ==
Born in Vale Real, Pedro Lucas joined the youth academy of Internacional in 2008. In 2015, he captained the under-17 side and scored 25 goals in 42 matches.

Ahead of the 2019 season, Pedro Lucas was promoted to the senior team. On 22 January, he made his professional debut, playing the whole ninety minutes of a 1–0 win against São Luiz, in Campeonato Gaúcho.

On 20 July 2021, he moved to Portugal and signed with Mafra.

== Personal life ==
Pedro Lucas' younger sister, Maria Luiza, is also a footballer. Their father André represented Grêmio at the junior level.

== Career statistics ==
As of match played 3 November 2024

Appearances and goals by club, season and competition
Club	Season	League			State league		National cup (Note: Includes Copa do Brasil, Taça de Portugal, Slovenian Cup)		League cup (Note: Includes Taça da Liga)		Continental		Other		Total	
Club	Season	Division	Apps	Goals	Apps	Goals	Apps	Goals	Apps	Goals	Apps	Goals	Apps	Goals	Apps	Goalsx
Internacional	2019	Série A	5	0	7 (Note: Appearance(s) in Campeonato Gaúcho)	1	0	0	—		2 (Note: Appearance(s) in Copa Libertadores)	0	—		14	1
Internacional	2020	Série A	0	0	0	0	0	0	—		0	0	—		0	0
Internacional	2021	Série A	0	0	0	0	0	0	—		0	0	—		0	0
Internacional	Total		5	0	7	1	0	0	—		2	0	—		14	1
Figueirense (loan)	2020	Série B	5	0	9 (Note: Appearance(s) in Campeonato Catarinense)	3	4	0	—		—		—		18	3
CSA (loan)	2020	Série B	24	5	0	0	0	0	—		—		0	0	24	5
CSA (loan)	2021	Série B	0	0	0	0	0	0	—		—		1 (Note: Appearance(s) in Copa do Nordeste)	0	1	0
CSA (loan)	Total		24	5	0	0	0	0	—		—		1	0	25	5
Mirassol (loan)	2021	Série C	0	0	14 (Note: Appearance(s) in Campeonato Paulista)	3	1	0	—		—		—		15	3
Mafra	2021–22	Liga Portugal 2	28	5	—		6	1	0	0	—		—		34	6
Mafra	2022–23	Liga Portugal 2	33	4	—		2	1	3	0	—		—		38	5
Mafra	Total		61	9	—		8	2	3	0	—		—		72	11
Olimpija Ljubljana	2023–24	Slovenian PrvaLiga	23	3	—		2	1	—		10 (Note: Four appearances in UEFA Champions League, two appearances in UEFA Europa League, four appearances and two goals in UEFA Europa Conference League)	2	—		35	6
Olimpija Ljubljana	2024–25	Slovenian PrvaLiga	12	2	—		2	0	—		8 (Note: Appearance(s) in UEFA Conference League)	4	—		22	6
Olimpija Ljubljana	Total		35	5	—		4	1	—		18	6	—		57	12
Career total			130	19	30	7	17	3	3	0	20	6	1	0	201	35
