= Nemanja Motika =

Serbian footballer (born 2003)

Personal information
- Date of birth: 20 March 2003 (age 23)
- Place of birth: Berlin, Germany
- Height: 1.79 m (5 ft 10 in)
- Positions: Winger; forward

Team information
- Current team: Olimpija Ljubljana
- Number: 20

Youth career
- BFC Preussen
- –2012: Hertha Zehlendorf
- 2012–2017: Hertha BSC
- 2017–2022: Bayern Munich
- 2022: Red Star Belgrade

Senior career*
Years	Team	Apps	(Gls)
2021–2022	Bayern Munich II	27	(16)
2022	Bayern Munich	0	(0)
2022–2023	Red Star Belgrade	10	(1)
2023	→ Austria Lustenau (loan)	15	(1)
2023–	Olimpija Ljubljana	38	(8)
2024–2025	→ Greuther Fürth (loan)	11	(0)

International career
2018	Germany U16	1	(0)
2021–2022	Serbia U19	12	(3)
2022	Serbia U21	2	(0)
- * Club domestic league appearances and goals as of 1 June 2025

Nemanja Motika (Serbian Cyrillic: Немања Мотика; born 20 March 2003) is a professional footballer who plays as a winger or forward for Slovenian PrvaLiga club Olimpija Ljubljana. Born in Germany, he represented both Germany and Serbia at youth international level.

== Club career ==
Motika made his professional debut for Bayern Munich II in the 3. Liga on 9 May 2021, coming on as a substitute in the 68th minute for Rémy Vita against SpVgg Unterhaching. Four minutes later, he scored his first goal for the club, halving Bayern's deficit to 2–1. The home match finished as a loss with no further goals scored.

After an impressive half-season at Bayern Munich II, where he scored 15 goals and provided 8 assists for the Martín Demichelis' team, Motika was called up to Bayern Munich first squad for the match against Borussia Mönchengladbach in January 2022; however, he failed to make an appearance and was an unused substitute.

On 2 February 2022, Motika signed a four-year contract with Red Star Belgrade and took the number 17 shirt on the advice of fellow German footballer Marko Marin.

On 12 June 2023, Motika transferred to Slovenian PrvaLiga champions Olimpija Ljubljana on a free transfer, with Red Star receiving the full transfer fee for future transfers under €1.5 million and an additional 20% of the remaining fee should the transfer exceed this price.

== International career ==
Motika played one match for the Germany national under-16 team in September 2018 against Cyprus. In November 2020, he was called up to train with the Serbia national under-19 team.

== Personal life ==
Motika was born in Berlin, and is of Serbian descent. His father hails from the Nišići plateau near Sarajevo, and his mother hails from Vranje.

== Career statistics ==
=== Club ===
As of 28 May 2025

Appearances and goals by club, season and competition
Club	Season	League			National cup		Continental		Other		Total	
Club	Season	Division	Apps	Goals	Apps	Goals	Apps	Goals	Apps	Goals	Apps	Goals
Bayern Munich II	2020–21	3. Liga	3	1	—		—		—		3	1
Bayern Munich II	2021–22	Regionalliga	24	15	—		—		—		24	15
Bayern Munich II	Total		27	16	—		—		—		27	16
Bayern Munich	2021–22	Bundesliga	0	0	0	0	0	0	0	0	0	0
Red Star Belgrade	2021–22	Serbian SuperLiga	10	1	2	0	2 (Note: Appearance(s) in UEFA Europa League)	0	—		14	1
Red Star Belgrade	2022–23	Serbian SuperLiga	0	0	1	0	1	0	—		2	0
Red Star Belgrade	Total		10	1	3	0	3	0	—		16	1
Austria Lustenau (loan)	2022–23	Austrian Bundesliga	15	1	0	0	—		3 (Note: Appearance(s) in Austrian Bundesliga Europa Conference League play-offs)	0	18	1
Olimpija Ljubljana	2023–24	Slovenian PrvaLiga	32	7	1	0	13 (Note: Five appearances in UEFA Champions League, two appearances in UEFA Europa League, six appearances in UEFA Europa Conference League)	0	—		46	7
Olimpija Ljubljana	2024–25	Slovenian PrvaLiga	6	1	0	0	5 (Note: Appearance(s) in UEFA Conference League)	1	—		11	2
Olimpija Ljubljana	Total		38	8	1	0	18	1	—		57	9
Greuther Fürth (loan)	2024–25	2. Bundesliga	11	0	1	0	—		—		12	0
Career total			101	26	5	0	21	1	3	0	130	27

== Honours ==
Red Star Belgrade

- Serbian SuperLiga: 2021–22
- Serbian Cup: 2021–22
