= Ivan Durdov =

Croatian footballer

Personal information
- Date of birth: 17 July 2000 (age 26)
- Place of birth: Split, Croatia
- Height: 1.94 m (6 ft 4 in)
- Position: Forward

Team information
- Current team: Bruk-Bet Termalica
- Number: 19

Youth career
- Adriatic
- 2013–2017: RNK Split

Senior career*
| Years | Team | Apps | (Gls) |
| 2017–2021 | Osijek II | 36 | (4) |
| 2020–2021 | → Solin (loan) | 17 | (5) |
| 2021 | Rudeš | 17 | (2) |
| 2021–2022 | Solin | 15 | (5) |
| 2022 | Orijent | 15 | (8) |
| 2022–2023 | Domžale | 17 | (7) |
| 2023–2024 | Oostende | 8 | (0) |
| 2023–2024 | → Mirandés (loan) | 20 | (1) |
| 2024–2026 | Olimpija Ljubljana | 59 | (17) |
| 2026– | Bruk-Bet Termalica | 16 | (3) |

International career
| 2018 | Croatia U18 | 2 | (0) |
| 2021 | Croatia U20 | 1 | (0) |
- * Club domestic league appearances and goals as of 21:40, 25 May 2026 (UTC)

Ivan Durdov (born 17 July 2000) is a Croatian professional footballer who plays as a forward for I liga club Bruk-Bet Termalica Nieciecza.

== Club career ==
Born in Split, Durdov played for hometown sides NK Adriatic and RNK Split as a youth. He joined NK Osijek in 2017, and made his senior debut with their reserve team, playing for two seasons in the Druga HNL.

In 2020, Durdov was loaned to fellow second division side NK Solin, but his loan was terminated in January of the following year, and he subsequently moved to NK Rudeš in the same division. After narrowly missing out promotion, he returned to Solin, now with a permanent contract.

On 19 January 2022, Durdov joined HNK Orijent also in division two. He left the club on 15 June, moving abroad for the first time in his career with NK Domžale of the Slovenian PrvaLiga.

On 17 January 2023, Durdov switched teams and countries again, signing a contract with KV Oostende of the Belgian Pro League. On 17 August, after featuring rarely and with Oostende now relegated to the Challenger Pro League, he was loaned to Spanish Segunda División side CD Mirandés for the season.

On 15 February 2024, Durdov signed a two-and-a-half-year contract with Olimpija Ljubljana in Slovenia.

On 16 January 2026, Durdov moved to Polish club Bruk-Bet Termalica Nieciecza on a two-and-a-half-year deal, for a reported fee of €100,000.

== Career statistics ==
As of match played 23 May 2026

Appearances and goals by club, season and competition
| Club | Season | League | | | National cup (Note: Includes Croatian Cup, Copa del Rey, Slovenian Cup) | | Continental | | Total | |
| Club | Season | Division | Apps | Goals | Apps | Goals | Apps | Goals | Apps | Goals |
|---|---|---|---|---|---|---|---|---|---|---|
| Osijek II | 2017–18 | 3. HNL | 9 | 2 | 0 | 0 | — | | 9 | 2 |
| Osijek II | 2018–19 | 2. HNL | 16 | 1 | 0 | 0 | — | | 16 | 1 |
| Osijek II | 2019–20 | 2. HNL | 11 | 1 | 0 | 0 | — | | 11 | 1 |
| Osijek II | Total | | 36 | 4 | 0 | 0 | — | | 36 | 4 |
| Solin (loan) | 2020–21 | 2. HNL | 17 | 5 | 0 | 0 | — | | 17 | 5 |
| Rudeš | 2020–21 | 2. HNL | 17 | 2 | 0 | 0 | — | | 17 | 2 |
| Solin | 2021–22 | 2. HNL | 15 | 5 | 0 | 0 | — | | 15 | 5 |
| Orijent | 2021–22 | 2. HNL | 15 | 8 | 0 | 0 | — | | 15 | 8 |
| Domžale | 2022–23 | 1. SNL | 17 | 7 | 2 | 2 | — | | 19 | 9 |
| Oostende | 2022–23 | Belgian Pro League | 8 | 0 | 0 | 0 | — | | 8 | 0 |
| Oostende | 2023–24 | Challenger Pro League | 0 | 0 | 0 | 0 | — | | 0 | 0 |
| Oostende | Total | | 8 | 0 | 0 | 0 | — | | 8 | 0 |
| Mirandés (loan) | 2023–24 | Segunda División | 20 | 1 | 2 | 1 | — | | 22 | 2 |
| Olimpija Ljubljana | 2023–24 | 1. SNL | 16 | 5 | 1 | 0 | — | | 17 | 5 |
| Olimpija Ljubljana | 2024–25 | 1. SNL | 27 | 5 | 3 | 1 | 13 (Note: Appearance(s) in UEFA Conference League) | 2 | 43 | 8 |
| Olimpija Ljubljana | 2025–26 | 1. SNL | 16 | 7 | 0 | 0 | 8 (Note: Two appearances in UEFA Champions League, six appearances and two goals in UEFA Conference League) | 3 | 24 | 10 |
| Olimpija Ljubljana | Total | | 59 | 17 | 4 | 1 | 21 | 5 | 84 | 23 |
| Bruk-Bet Termalica | 2025–26 | Ekstraklasa | 16 | 3 | — | | — | | 16 | 3 |
| Career total | | | 220 | 52 | 8 | 4 | 21 | 5 | 249 | 61 |

== Honours ==
Olimpija Ljubljana

- Slovenian PrvaLiga: 2024–25
