= Manuel Pedreño =

Spanish footballer

Manu Pedreño
Personal information
- Full name: Antonio Manuel Moñino Pedreño
- Date of birth: 9 October 2000 (age 26)
- Place of birth: Garres y Lages, Spain
- Height: 1.90 m (6 ft 3 in)
- Position: Defender

Team information
- Current team: Ibiza
- Number: 16

Youth career
- Ranero
- UCAM Murcia
- 2019: Almería

Senior career*
Years	Team	Apps	(Gls)
2019–2021	Almería B	39	(0)
2021–2022	Antequera	16	(1)
2022–2023	Murcia	24	(0)
2023–2024	Tarazona	34	(0)
2024–2025	Olimpija Ljubljana	19	(1)
2025–	Ibiza	21	(1)
- * Club domestic league appearances and goals as of 10 June 2026

Antonio Manuel Moñino "Manu" Pedreño (born 9 October 2000) is a Spanish footballer who plays as a defender for Primera Federación club Ibiza.

A centre-back who has also played as a full-back, Pedreño played for Slovenian PrvaLiga club Olimpija Ljubljana in 2024–25, winning the league title.

== Career ==
Born in the village of Garres y Lages in Murcia, Pedreño went from Ranero CF to the youth ranks of UCAM Murcia CF and UD Almería, where he began playing senior football in their reserve team in the Segunda División B and Tercera División. In July 2021, he signed for Antequera CF of the new fourth-tier Segunda Federación.

In January 2022, after 16 games and one goal for Antequera, Pedreño moved to Real Murcia in the same league for the remainder of the season. Though considered by some fans to be an unnecessary addition, he became a regular part of the side that won promotion to the Primera Federación.

In June 2023, with Pedreño having lost his starting place at Murcia, he was tracked by Hércules CF who needed to free up an under-23 slot for his signing. He left in August for SD Tarazona, also in the third tier.

Pedreño moved abroad for the first time in his career in July 2024, signing for NK Olimpija Ljubljana under compatriot manager Víctor Sánchez. He made his debut in the Slovenian PrvaLiga on 25 August in the 1–1 draw with NK Maribor in the Eternal derby, being substituted for Jorge Silva at half time. He also took part in the UEFA Conference League. His team won the league in the 2024–25 season, in which he scored his only goal in the 5–0 home win over NK Radomlje on 17 May that sealed the title with a game remaining.

On 27 August 2025, Pedreño returned to Spain's third tier by signing for UD Ibiza on a two-year contract.

== Honours ==
Olimpija Ljubljana

- Slovenian PrvaLiga: 2024–25
