= Vid Chinoso Juvančič =

Slovenian footballer (born 2007)

Personal information
- Full name: Vid Chinoso Ugwaegbunam Juvančič
- Date of birth: 16 April 2008 (age 18)
- Place of birth: Ljubljana, Slovenia
- Height: 1.84 m (6 ft 0 in)
- Position: Winger

Team information
- Current team: Radomlje
- Number: 29

Youth career
- Radomlje

Senior career*
Years	Team	Apps	(Gls)
2024–	Radomlje	20	(0)

International career^{‡}
2024	Slovenia U17	2	(0)
- * Club domestic league appearances and goals ‡ National team caps and goals as of 7 November 2024

Vid Chinoso Ugwaegbunam Juvančič (born 16 April 2008), is a Slovenian professional footballer who plays as a winger for Radomlje.

== Club career ==
As a youth player, Juvančič joined the youth academy of Radomlje, where he received interest from the youth academies of Italian Serie A sides Inter and Juventus. At the age of sixteen, he debuted for the club's senior team.

== International career ==
Juvančič is a Slovenia youth international. On 7 November 2024, he debuted for the Slovenia national under-17 football team during a 0–1 home friendly loss to the Czech Republic national under-17 football team.
