= Mateo Karamatic =

Austrian footballer (born 2001)

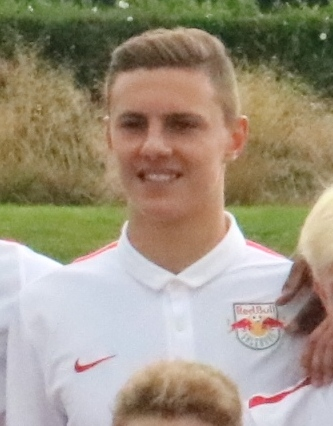
- Karamatic in 2016

Personal information
- Date of birth: 28 September 2001 (age 25)
- Place of birth: Ehenbichl, Austria
- Height: 1.87 m (6 ft 2 in)
- Position: Centre-back

Team information
- Current team: Dukla Prague
- Number: 55

Youth career
- 2007–2015: SV Reutte
- 2015–2018: Red Bull Salzburg

Senior career*
Years	Team	Apps	(Gls)
2018	USK Anif II	12	(1)
2018–2020	USK Anif	17	(0)
2020–2022	Osijek II	39	(1)
2022–2024	Olimpija Ljubljana	35	(1)
2024–2025	TSV Hartberg	23	(0)
2025–2026	Al-Nasr	3	(0)
2026–	Dukla Prague	1	(0)
- * Club domestic league appearances and goals as of 19:28, 17 October 2026 (UTC)

Mateo Karamatic (Croatian: Karamatić; born 28 September 2001) is an Austrian professional football player who plays as a centre-back for Czech National Football League club Dukla Prague.

== Career ==
Karamatic is a youth product of the Austrian clubs SV Reutte and Red Bull Salzburg. In 2018, he began his senior career with USK Anif in the Austrian Regionalliga. In 2020, he moved to Croatia with the Osijek reserves in the First Football League. On 18 July 2022, he transferred to the Slovenian PrvaLiga club Olimpija Ljubljana on a contract until 2025, and helped them win the 2022–23 Slovenian Football Cup and 2024–25 Slovenian PrvaLiga. On 10 July 2024, he returned to Austria with TSV Hartberg on a 1-year contract. On 11 June 2025, he signed with Al-Nasr SC in the UAE Pro League on a contract until 2027.

On 11 September 2026, Karamatic signed for Czech National Football League side Dukla Prague.

== Personal life ==
Born in Austria, Karamatic is of Croatian descent and holds dual Austrian-Croatian citizenship.

== Honours ==
Olimpija Ljubljana

- Slovenian Football Cup: 2022–23
- Slovenian PrvaLiga: 2024–25
