= Jorge Silva (footballer, born 1996) =

Portuguese footballer (born 1996)

Personal information
- Full name: Jorge Fernando dos Santos Silva
- Date of birth: 22 March 1996 (age 30)
- Place of birth: Porto, Portugal
- Height: 1.83 m (6 ft 0 in)
- Position: Right-back

Team information
- Current team: Turan Tovuz
- Number: 7

Youth career
- 2005–2008: Salgueiros
- 2008–2014: Leixões
- 2014–2015: Sporting CP

Senior career*
Years	Team	Apps	(Gls)
2015–2016	Sporting CP B	7	(0)
2016–2019	Leixões	82	(0)
2019–2023	Paços Ferreira	42	(0)
2023–2025	Olimpija Ljubljana	63	(3)
2025–	Turan Tovuz	27	(1)

International career
2014	Portugal U18	5	(0)
2014–2015	Portugal U19	8	(0)
2016	Portugal U20	2	(0)
- * Club domestic league appearances and goals as of 00:25, 23 June 2026 (UTC)

Jorge Fernando dos Santos Silva (born 22 March 1996) is a Portuguese professional footballer who plays as a right-back for Azerbaijan Premier League club Turan Tovuz.

== Club career ==
=== Sporting CP ===
Born in Porto, Silva finished his development at Sporting CP. He made his senior debut with their reserves in the LigaPro on 23 January 2016, playing the entire 3–0 away loss against Farense.

=== Leixões ===
Silva signed with Leixões of the same league on 17 June 2016. During his spell at the Estádio do Mar he appeared in an average of 28 league matches, being sent off in the 1–0 home defeat to Académico de Viseu on 30 October 2016.

=== Paços Ferreira ===
On 1 July 2019, Silva joined Primeira Liga club Paços de Ferreira on a three-year contract. He played his first game in the competition on 4 November, as a second-half substitute in the 1–0 loss at B-SAD.

Silva missed the vast majority of the 2020–21 and 2021–22 seasons, due to injury.

=== Olimpija Ljubljana ===
On 26 June 2023, Silva moved abroad for the first time and signed with Slovenian PrvaLiga champions Olimpija Ljubljana on a two-year contract. His debut on 11 July was the first European game of his career, a 2–1 home win over Latvia's Valmiera in the first qualifying round of the UEFA Champions League.

Silva scored his first goal as a professional on 6 April 2024, his team's second in the 3–2 away victory against Rogaška after replacing his compatriot David Sualehe at half-time. He won the national league at the end of the 2024–25 campaign.

=== Later career ===
On 11 September 2025, Silva joined Azerbaijan Premier League side Turan Tovuz on a two-year deal.

== Honours ==
Olimpija Ljubljana

- Slovenian PrvaLiga: 2024–25
