= Reda Boultam =

Dutch footballer (born 1998)

Personal information
- Date of birth: 3 March 1998 (age 28)
- Place of birth: Almere, Netherlands
- Height: 1.87 m (6 ft 2 in)
- Position: Midfielder

Youth career
- SC Buitenboys
- –2013: Almere City
- 2013–2018: Ajax

Senior career*
Years	Team	Apps	(Gls)
2016–2018	Ajax	0	(0)
2016–2018	Jong Ajax	5	(0)
2018–2020	Cremonese	18	(1)
2020–2021	Triestina	9	(2)
2021	→ Salernitana (loan)	1	(0)
2021–2023	Salernitana	0	(0)
2021–2022	→ Cosenza (loan)	22	(0)
2022–2023	→ Istra 1961 (loan)	22	(2)
2023–2026	Olimpija Ljubljana	35	(4)

International career
2015	Netherlands U17	8	(1)
2015	Netherlands U18	1	(0)
- * Club domestic league appearances and goals as of 24 April 2026

Reda Boultam (born 3 March 1998) is a Dutch professional footballer who plays as a midfielder.

== Club career ==
Boultam made his professional debut in the Eerste Divisie for Jong Ajax on 27 January 2017 in a game against FC Den Bosch.

On 9 July 2018, Boultam's contract at Ajax was not extended. He moved on a free transfer to Italian club Cremonese. On 7 August 2020, his contract with Cremonese was terminated.

On 16 August 2020, Triestina announced that Boultam had signed a three-year contract with the club.

On 1 February 2021, Boultam moved to Serie B club Salernitana on loan with an obligation to buy.

On 12 August 2021, he went to Cosenza on loan. On 31 August 2022, Salernitana loaned Boultam again, this time to Istra 1961 in Croatia.

On 23 August 2023, Boultam joined Slovenian team Olimpija Ljubljana on a contract until 2026.

== Career statistics ==
=== Club ===
As of match played 30 October 2019

Appearances and goals by club, season and competition
Club	Season	Division	League		National cup		Other		Total	
Club	Season	Division	Apps	Goals	Apps	Goals	Apps	Goals	Apps	Goals
Jong Ajax	2016–17	Eerste Divisie	1	0	—		—		1	0
Jong Ajax	2017–18	Eerste Divisie	4	0	—		—		4	0
Jong Ajax	Total		5	0	—		—		5	0
Cremonese	2018–19	Serie B	14	1	1	0	—		15	1
Cremonese	2019–20	Serie B	4	0	3	0	—		7	0
Cremonese	Total		18	1	4	0	—		22	1
Career total			23	1	4	0	0	0	27	1
