= Martin Pečar =

Slovenian footballer (born 2002)

Personal information
- Date of birth: 5 July 2002 (age 24)
- Place of birth: Izola, Slovenia
- Height: 1.75 m (5 ft 9 in)
- Positions: Winger; attacking midfielder

Team information
- Current team: Tenerife

Youth career
- –2014: Izola
- 2014–2017: Koper
- 2017–2018: Olimpija Ljubljana
- 2018–2021: Eintracht Frankfurt

Senior career*
Years	Team	Apps	(Gls)
2021–2022	Eintracht Frankfurt	0	(0)
2022	→ Austria Wien II (loan)	9	(0)
2022–2024	Austria Wien II	22	(3)
2023–2024	→ Bravo (loan)	27	(7)
2024–2026	Bravo	69	(13)
2026–	Tenerife	0	(0)

International career
2017	Slovenia U15	5	(1)
2017	Slovenia U16	4	(0)
2017–2019	Slovenia U17	25	(4)
2019	Slovenia U18	4	(1)
2019–2020	Slovenia U19	8	(0)
2020–2025	Slovenia U21	14	(0)
- * Club domestic league appearances and goals as of 18 June 2026

Martin Pečar (born 5 July 2002) is a Slovenian footballer who plays as a midfielder for Segunda División club Tenerife.

== Career ==
In early 2018, at the age of 15, Pečar trained with the senior team of Slovenian side Olimpija Ljubljana. Before the second half of 2021–22, he was sent on loan to Austria Wien II in the Austrian second tier from German Bundesliga club Eintracht Frankfurt. On 18 February 2022, he debuted for Austria Wien II during a 2–0 defeat against Floridsdorfer AC. On 1 July 2022, the transfer to Austria was made permanent.

== Honours ==
Individual

- Slovenian PrvaLiga Player of the Month: September 2023
