= Nick Perc =

Slovenian footballer (born 2003)

Personal information
- Date of birth: 27 May 2003 (age 23)
- Height: 1.80 m (5 ft 11 in)
- Position: Forward

Team information
- Current team: Ilirija 1911

Youth career
- –2018: Šampion
- 2018–2019: Celje
- 2019–2022: Domžale

Senior career*
Years	Team	Apps	(Gls)
2020–2025	Domžale	88	(2)
2026	Egaleo	3	(1)
2026–	Ilirija 1911	0	(0)

International career
2017–2018	Slovenia U15	5	(0)
2018–2019	Slovenia U16	9	(1)
2019	Slovenia U17	11	(2)
2021	Slovenia U19	1	(0)
2022–2024	Slovenia U21	5	(0)
- * Club domestic league appearances and goals as of 30 July 2026

Nick Perc (born 27 May 2003) is a Slovenian footballer who plays as a forward for Ilirija 1911.

== Career statistics ==
=== Club ===
As of 11 June 2022

Appearances and goals by club, season and competition
Club	Season	League			National cup		Continental		Total	
Club	Season	Division	Apps	Goals	Apps	Goals	Apps	Goals	Apps	Goals
Domžale	2019–20	1. SNL	1	0	0	0	0	0	1	0
Domžale	2020–21	1. SNL	2	0	0	0	0	0	2	0
Domžale	2021–22	1. SNL	12	0	0	0	1 (Note: Appearances in UEFA Europa Conference League)	0	13	0
Domžale	Total		15	0	0	0	1	0	16	0
Career total			15	0	0	0	1	0	16	0
