= Ahmed Sidibé (footballer, born 2002) =

French footballer (born 2002)

Personal information
- Full name: Ahmed Franck Sidibé
- Date of birth: 10 February 2002 (age 24)
- Place of birth: Villeneuve-Saint-Georges, France
- Height: 1.89 m (6 ft 2 in)
- Position: Centre-back

Team information
- Current team: Vitória de Guimarães (on loan from Venezia)
- Number: 5

Youth career
- CFF Paris
- 2018–2019: Saint-Étienne

Senior career*
Years	Team	Apps	(Gls)
2019–2024	Saint-Étienne II	39	(0)
2024–2025	Koper	54	(2)
2025–	Venezia	5	(0)
2026–	→ Vitória de Guimarães (loan)	0	(0)
- * Club domestic league appearances and goals as of 23 August 2026 ‡ National team caps and goals as of 23:28, 16 May 2026 (UTC)

Ahmed Franck Sidibé (born 10 February 2002) is a French professional footballer who plays as a centre-back for Primeira Liga club Vitória de Guimarães, on loan from Serie A club Venezia.

== Career ==
A youth product of CFF Paris and Saint-Étienne, Sidibé started playing with Saint-Étienne's reserves in 2019. On 28 May 2021, he signed his first professional contract with Sidibé. On 8 January 2024, he joined Koper in the Slovenian PrvaLiga. He was named to the 2024–25 Slovenian PrvaLiga Team of the Season. On 28 August 2025, he transferred to the Serie B club Venezia on a 3+2 year contract. He helped Venezia win the 2025–26 Serie B, earning promotion to Serie A.

== Personal life ==
Born in France, Sidibé is of Ivorian and Senegalese descent.

== Honours ==
Venezia

- Serie B: 2025–26

Individual

- 2024–25 Slovenian PrvaLiga Team of the Season
