= 2022–23 Slovenian PrvaLiga =

Slovenian PrvaLiga
- Season: 2022–23
- Dates: 15 July 2022 – 20 May 2023
- Champions: Olimpija Ljubljana (3rd title)
- Relegated: Gorica; Tabor Sežana
- Champions League: Olimpija Ljubljana
- Europa Conference League: Celje; Maribor; Domžale
- Matches: 180
- Goals: 457 (2.54 per match)
- Best player: Žan Vipotnik
- Top goalscorer: Žan Vipotnik (20 goals)
- Biggest home win: Maribor 7–0 Radomlje
- Biggest away win: Tabor 0–8 Olimpija
- Highest scoring: Tabor 0–8 Olimpija
- Longest winning run: 8 matches Olimpija
- Longest unbeaten run: 11 matches Radomlje
- Longest winless run: 19 matches Radomlje
- Longest losing run: 4 matches Bravo, Gorica and Koper
- Highest attendance: 9,611; Maribor 2–0 Olimpija
- Lowest attendance: 0 (behind closed doors); Olimpija 2–0 Mura; Maribor 0–3 Domžale
- Total attendance: 227,209
- Average attendance: 1,276

The 2022–23 Slovenian PrvaLiga was the 32nd edition of the Slovenian PrvaLiga since its establishment in 1991. The season began on 15 July 2022 and ended on 20 May 2023. Olimpija Ljubljana won the league after beating Maribor 2–0 in the 31st round, clinching their third league title with five rounds to go. As champions, they qualified for the first qualifying round of the 2023–24 UEFA Champions League.

Maribor were the defending champions after winning their sixteenth title in the previous season.

== Competition format ==
Each team played 36 matches (18 home and 18 away). Teams played four matches against each other (2 home and 2 away).

== Teams ==
Aluminij were relegated after finishing last in the previous season. Gorica were promoted from the Slovenian Second League.

=== Stadiums and locations ===
Seating capacity only; some stadiums also have standing areas.

| Bravo | Celje | Domžale | Gorica |
|---|---|---|---|
| Šiška Sports Park | Stadion Z'dežele | Domžale Sports Park | Nova Gorica Sports Park |
| Capacity: 2,308 | Capacity: 13,059 | Capacity: 3,100 | Capacity: 3,100 |
| Koper | 2022–23 Slovenian PrvaLiga is located in Slovenia | | Maribor |
| Bonifika Stadium | 2022–23 Slovenian PrvaLiga is located in Slovenia | | Ljudski vrt |
| Capacity: 4,047 | 2022–23 Slovenian PrvaLiga is located in Slovenia | | Capacity: 11,709 |
| Mura | Olimpija Ljubljana | Radomlje | Tabor Sežana |
| Fazanerija City Stadium | Stožice Stadium | Domžale Sports Park | Rajko Štolfa Stadium |
| Capacity: 4,506 | Capacity: 16,038 | Capacity: 3,100 | Capacity: 1,310 |

=== Personnel and kits ===
| Team | Manager | Captain | Kit manufacturer | Shirt sponsor |
|---|---|---|---|---|
| Bravo | (Slovenia) Aleš Arnol | (Slovenia) Martin Kramarič | Joma | Nomago, Mastercard, Generali |
| Celje | (Ukraine) Roman Pylypchuk | (Slovenia) Denis Popović | Nike | Cinkarna |
| Domžale | (Slovenia) Simon Rožman | (North Macedonia) Zeni Husmani | Joma | None |
| Gorica | (Slovenia) Agron Šalja | (Slovenia) Etien Velikonja | Erreà | Hit, E3 |
| Koper | (Slovenia) Zoran Zeljković | (Slovenia) Matej Palčič | Macron | Port of Koper |
| Maribor | (Croatia) Damir Krznar | (Slovenia) Martin Milec | Adidas | Zavarovalnica Sava, Nova KBM, Radio City |
| Mura | (Slovenia) Dejan Grabić | (Slovenia) Žiga Kous | Adidas | Generali |
| Olimpija Ljubljana | (Spain) Albert Riera | (Slovenia) Timi Max Elšnik | Puma | None |
| Radomlje | (Slovenia) Oliver Bogatinov | (Slovenia) Luka Cerar | Joma | Kalcer |
| Tabor Sežana | (Slovenia) Dušan Kosič | (Slovenia) Jan Koprivec | Erreà | CherryBox24, Involta |

=== Managerial changes ===
| Team | Outgoing manager | Date of vacancy | Position in table | Incoming manager | Date of appointment |
|---|---|---|---|---|---|
| Maribor | (Slovenia) Radovan Karanović | 15 August 2022 | 10th | (Croatia) Damir Krznar | 16 August 2022 |
| Radomlje | (Bosnia and Herzegovina) Nermin Bašić | 9 December 2022 | 9th | (Slovenia) Oliver Bogatinov | 22 December 2022 |
| Gorica | (Slovenia) Miran Srebrnič | 24 February 2023 | 10th | (Italy) Edoardo Reja | 2 March 2023 |
| Bravo | (Slovenia) Dejan Grabić | 28 February 2023 | 7th | (Slovenia) Aleš Arnol | 1 March 2023 |
| Mura | (Slovenia) Damir Čontala | 28 February 2023 | 6th | (Slovenia) Dejan Grabić | 28 February 2023 |
| Gorica | (Italy) Edoardo Reja | 17 April 2023 | 9th | (Slovenia) Agron Šalja | 17 April 2023 |

== League table ==
| Pos | Team | Pld | W | D | L | GF | GA | GD | Pts | Qualification or relegation |
|---|---|---|---|---|---|---|---|---|---|---|
| 1 | Olimpija Ljubljana (C) | 36 | 23 | 4 | 9 | 60 | 39 | +21 | 73 | Qualification for the Champions League first qualifying round |
| 2 | Celje | 36 | 19 | 10 | 7 | 53 | 34 | +19 | 67 | Qualification for the Europa Conference League second qualifying round |
| 3 | Maribor | 36 | 18 | 8 | 10 | 70 | 43 | +27 | 62 | Qualification for the Europa Conference League first qualifying round |
| 4 | Domžale | 36 | 13 | 13 | 10 | 50 | 42 | +8 | 52 | Qualification for the Europa Conference League first qualifying round |
| 5 | Mura | 36 | 13 | 13 | 10 | 50 | 45 | +5 | 52 | |
| 6 | Koper | 36 | 14 | 8 | 14 | 46 | 40 | +6 | 50 | |
| 7 | Radomlje | 36 | 10 | 14 | 12 | 35 | 53 | −18 | 44 | |
| 8 | Bravo | 36 | 9 | 9 | 18 | 33 | 41 | −8 | 36 | |
| 9 | Gorica (R) | 36 | 5 | 12 | 19 | 31 | 57 | −26 | 27 | Qualification for the relegation play-offs |
| 10 | Tabor Sežana (R) | 36 | 3 | 15 | 18 | 29 | 63 | −34 | 24 | Relegation to Slovenian Second League |

Source: PrvaLiga
Rules for classification: 1) Points; 2) Head-to-head points; 3) Head-to-head goal difference; 4) Head-to-head goals scored; 5) Goal difference; 6) Goals scored
(C) Champions; (R) Relegated

== Results ==
=== First half of the season ===
| Home \ Away | BRA | CEL | DOM | GOR | KOP | MAR | MUR | OLI | RAD | TAB |
|---|---|---|---|---|---|---|---|---|---|---|
| Bravo | | 2–0 | 0–1 | 2–0 | 1–0 | 0–1 | 0–1 | 6–1 | 1–1 | 2–1 |
| Celje | 1–0 | | 2–1 | 1–0 | 1–1 | 3–3 | 3–3 | 4–3 | 2–1 | 1–0 |
| Domžale | 0–0 | 0–0 | | 5–1 | 0–2 | 3–2 | 2–2 | 0–3 | 3–1 | 1–1 |
| Gorica | 2–0 | 0–2 | 0–0 | | 1–2 | 1–4 | 0–0 | 0–0 | 0–1 | 1–1 |
| Koper | 2–0 | 0–2 | 1–1 | 1–1 | | 2–1 | 0–0 | 0–2 | 5–0 | 2–1 |
| Maribor | 3–0 | 2–2 | 0–3 | 3–2 | 0–1 | | 5–1 | 0–2 | 0–3 | 2–2 |
| Mura | 1–0 | 3–1 | 4–3 | 2–0 | 2–1 | 0–1 | | 2–3 | 3–0 | 2–2 |
| Olimpija | 1–0 | 0–0 | 3–2 | 2–0 | 2–1 | 1–0 | 2–0 | | 2–1 | 2–0 |
| Radomlje | 1–1 | 1–1 | 0–2 | 1–1 | 2–2 | 0–5 | 1–1 | 0–1 | | 0–0 |
| Tabor | 0–4 | 1–0 | 1–1 | 1–3 | 0–2 | 0–4 | 0–4 | 0–1 | 2–1 | |

Source: PrvaLiga
Legend: Blue = home team win; Yellow = draw; Red = away team win.

=== Second half of the season ===
| Home \ Away | BRA | CEL | DOM | GOR | KOP | MAR | MUR | OLI | RAD | TAB |
|---|---|---|---|---|---|---|---|---|---|---|
| Bravo | | 0–3 | 0–2 | 2–1 | 0–1 | 2–3 | 0–0 | 1–0 | 0–1 | 1–1 |
| Celje | 2–1 | | 1–0 | 0–1 | 2–0 | 3–1 | 2–1 | 0–1 | 1–1 | 0–0 |
| Domžale | 2–2 | 2–1 | | 1–1 | 0–0 | 1–1 | 0–0 | 2–1 | 1–2 | 0–4 |
| Gorica | 0–0 | 1–2 | 0–2 | | 2–2 | 0–3 | 1–1 | 2–2 | 1–1 | 1–0 |
| Koper | 1–0 | 0–1 | 2–3 | 1–0 | | 0–1 | 1–2 | 0–1 | 1–2 | 5–1 |
| Maribor | 1–1 | 2–0 | 1–0 | 2–1 | 3–1 | | 3–1 | 2–0 | 7–0 | 1–1 |
| Mura | 0–1 | 0–2 | 0–1 | 4–2 | 1–2 | 2–1 | | 2–1 | 1–1 | 2–2 |
| Olimpija | 2–1 | 0–2 | 1–4 | 4–3 | 3–2 | 2–0 | 0–0 | | 1–0 | 1–0 |
| Radomlje | 3–1 | 0–3 | 1–0 | 2–0 | 1–1 | 1–1 | 0–0 | 2–1 | | 0–0 |
| Tabor | 1–1 | 2–2 | 1–1 | 0–1 | 0–1 | 1–1 | 1–2 | 0–8 | 1–2 | |

Source: PrvaLiga
Legend: Blue = home team win; Yellow = draw; Red = away team win.

== PrvaLiga play-off ==
A two-legged play-off between the ninth-placed team from the PrvaLiga and the second-placed team from the 2022–23 Slovenian Second League was played. The winner earned a place in the 2023–24 PrvaLiga season.

25 May 2023
20:15 CEST

| Aluminij | 3–1 | Gorica |
|---|---|---|
| Brest 7'; Marinšek 57' (pen.); Skiba 78' | Report | Krajnc 19' |

Aluminij Sports Park, Kidričevo
Attendance: 600
Referee: Slavko Vinčić
28 May 2023
17:30 CEST

| Gorica | 1–1 | Aluminij |
|---|---|---|
| Iličić 9' | Report | Marinšek 27' |

Nova Gorica Sports Park, Nova Gorica
Attendance: 800
Referee: Rade Obrenović

Aluminij won 4–2 on aggregate.

== Statistics ==
=== Top scorers ===
| Rank | Player | Club | Goals |
|---|---|---|---|
| 1 | (Slovenia) Žan Vipotnik | Maribor | 20 |
| 2 | (Kosovo) Mirlind Daku | Mura | 19 |
| 3 | (Slovenia) Aljoša Matko | Celje | 14 |
| 4 | (Slovenia) Andrej Kotnik | Koper | 12 |
| 4 | (Croatia) Franko Kovačević | Domžale | 12 |
| 4 | (Slovenia) Martin Kramarič | Bravo | 12 |
| 4 | (Bosnia and Herzegovina) Mario Kvesić | Olimpija Ljubljana | 12 |
| 8 | (Slovenia) Ester Sokler | Radomlje | 10 |
| 9 | (Nigeria) Bright Edomwonyi | Koper | 9 |
| 9 | (Nigeria) Chukwubuikem Ikwuemesi | Celje | 9 |
| 9 | (Slovenia) Svit Sešlar | Olimpija Ljubljana | 9 |

== Awards ==
=== Annual awards ===
PrvaLiga Player of the Year

- Žan Vipotnik

PrvaLiga Young player of the Year

- Žan Vipotnik

PrvaLiga Manager of the Year

- Albert Riera

=== PrvaLiga Team of the Season ===

2022–23 Team of the Season

| Player | Team | Position | Ref. |
|---|---|---|---|
| (Slovenia) Matevž Vidovšek | Olimpija Ljubljana | Goalkeeper | |
| (Serbia) Đorđe Crnomarković | Olimpija Ljubljana | Defender | |
| (Slovenia) Gregor Sikošek | Maribor | Defender | |
| (Sweden) Max Watson | Maribor | Defender | |
| (Slovenia) Marcel Ratnik | Olimpija Ljubljana | Defender | |
| (Slovenia) Timi Max Elšnik | Olimpija Ljubljana | Midfielder | |
| (Slovenia) Svit Sešlar | Olimpija Ljubljana | Midfielder | |
| (Bosnia and Herzegovina) Mario Kvesić | Olimpija Ljubljana | Midfielder | |
| (Kosovo) Mirlind Daku | Mura | Forward | |
| (Nigeria) Chukwubuikem Ikwuemesi | Celje | Forward | |
| (Slovenia) Žan Vipotnik | Maribor | Forward | |

== See also ==
- 2022–23 Slovenian Football Cup
- 2022–23 Slovenian Second League
