= Matevž Vidovšek =

Slovenian footballer (born 1999)

Personal information
- Date of birth: 30 October 1999 (age 27)
- Place of birth: Slovenj Gradec, Slovenia
- Height: 1.99 m (6 ft 6 in)
- Position: Goalkeeper

Team information
- Current team: Olimpija Ljubljana
- Number: 26

Youth career
- 2004–2015: Dravograd
- 2014: → Jarenina (loan)
- 2015–2016: Bravo
- 2016–2018: Atalanta
- 2018: → Pescara (loan)

Senior career*
Years	Team	Apps	(Gls)
2018–2020	Atalanta	0	(0)
2018–2019	→ Reggina 1914 (loan)	0	(0)
2019–2020	→ Ayia Napa (loan)	2	(0)
2020–	Olimpija Ljubljana	112	(0)

International career^{‡}
2015–2016	Slovenia U17	10	(0)
2017	Slovenia U18	4	(0)
2023–	Slovenia	2	(0)
- * Club domestic league appearances and goals as of 31 October 2026 ‡ National team caps and goals as of 17 March 2026

Matevž Vidovšek (born 30 October 1999) is a Slovenian professional footballer who plays as a goalkeeper for Slovenian PrvaLiga club Olimpija Ljubljana, where he has served as captain, and for the Slovenia national team. He won the Slovenian league title with Olimpija twice and the Slovenian Cup once.

He has also represented Slovenia at youth international level with the under-17 and under-18 teams.

== Club career ==
=== Early career and Italy ===
Vidovšek started his football career at local side Dravograd. In 2016, at the age of 16, he moved to the youth ranks of Serie A team Atalanta, and was later loaned to Italian teams Pescara and Reggina 1914, and Cypriot club Ayia Napa. He later said that Slovenian internationals Josip Iličić and Jasmin Kurtić helped him settle in Bergamo.

=== Olimpija Ljubljana ===
In September 2020, he signed a two-year contract with Slovenian PrvaLiga side Olimpija Ljubljana. He spent a season and a half as a backup goalkeeper, and later said he had considered ending his career as his contract was running out. He made his PrvaLiga debut in May 2022, in the last round of the 2021–22 Slovenian PrvaLiga season, keeping a clean sheet in a 2–0 away win over Celje, and was offered a new contract the following day. He credited club director Igor Barišić for his support and for the contract extension until 2025.

Under head coach Albert Riera, he became Olimpija's first-choice goalkeeper in the 2022–23 season and did not concede a league goal in his first six appearances. On 20 August 2022, he broke a bone in his left hand in a match against Koper, but played on until the end of the 2–0 win. In April 2023, he saved two penalties in the Slovenian Cup quarter-final shoot-out win against Celje (6–5), and in the final against Maribor, he saved a Panenka-style penalty by Marko Tolić. Olimpija won the league and cup double that season.

In the 2023–24 UEFA Champions League qualifiers, Vidovšek saved a 97th-minute penalty by Kiril Despodov against Ludogorets; Olimpija later reached the group stage of the UEFA Europa Conference League for the first time. He won his second league title with Olimpija in 2024–25.

In summer 2025, he was close to a transfer to Red Star Belgrade, but the move fell through due to health problems. He missed a long period in autumn 2025 after surgery. During his recovery, the club extended his contract until 2028; after returning in early 2026, he regained his place as the first-choice goalkeeper and captain. By February 2026, he had saved 7 of 17 penalties faced for Olimpija. In May 2026, clubs from England, France and Turkey were reported to be interested in him, but he remained at Olimpija for the 2026–27 season.

== International career ==
Vidovšek made 10 appearances for the Slovenia under-17 team and 4 for the under-18 team. He made his senior debut in June 2023 in a UEFA Euro 2024 qualifier against Denmark at Stožice Stadium (1–1), replacing the injured Jan Oblak. In March 2026, after a long absence, he was recalled by new head coach Boštjan Cesar for friendlies against Hungary and Montenegro, having earned two caps by then.

== Personal life ==
Vidovšek comes from the Carinthia region of Slovenia. In a 2022 interview, he shared that he is married and has a daughter. As a child, his role model was Iker Casillas, and he continues to follow Jan Oblak and Samir Handanović.

== Honours ==
Olimpija Ljubljana

- Slovenian PrvaLiga: 2022–23, 2024–25
- Slovenian Football Cup: 2022–23
