= Raul Florucz =

Austrian footballer (born 2001)

Personal information
- Full name: Raul Alexander Florucz
- Date of birth: 10 June 2001 (age 25)
- Place of birth: Vöcklabruck, Austria
- Height: 1.82 m (6 ft 0 in)
- Position: Winger

Team information
- Current team: Union Saint-Gilloise
- Number: 30

Youth career
- 2009–2013: DSG Union Haid
- 2013–2015: FC Pasching You
- 2015–2019: AKA Linz
- 2019–2020: Lokomotiva

Senior career*
Years	Team	Apps	(Gls)
2020–2023	Lokomotiva	8	(0)
2020–2021	→ Sesvete (loan)	12	(0)
2021	→ Hrvatski Dragovoljac (loan)	13	(2)
2022	→ Jarun (loan)	13	(6)
2022–2023	→ Jarun (loan)	24	(12)
2023–2025	Olimpija Ljubljana	60	(24)
2025–	Union Saint-Gilloise	33	(12)

International career^{‡}
2020	Austria U19	3	(0)
2025–	Austria	5	(0)
- * Club domestic league appearances and goals as of 25 October 2026 ‡ National team caps and goals as of 17 November 2026

Raul Alexander Florucz (born 10 June 2001) is an Austrian professional footballer who plays as a winger for Belgian Pro League club Union Saint-Gilloise and the Austria national team.

== Club career ==
=== Lokomotiva Zagreb ===
Florucz made his debut in the Croatian First League for Lokomotiva Zagreb on 17 July 2021 in a match against Hajduk Split.

=== Olimpija Ljubljana ===
In January 2023, he agreed to join Slovenian PrvaLiga team Olimpija Ljubljana during the summer transfer window (before the 2023–24 season), signing a three-year contract. He made his debut for Olimpija on 11 July in the first leg of the 2023–24 UEFA Champions League first qualifying round against Valmiera, which Olimpija won 2–1.

=== Union Saint-Gilloise ===
On 17 June 2025, Florucz joined Belgian Pro League side Union Saint-Gilloise by signing a contract until 2029. On 25 July 2025, Florucz scored on his league debut in a 1–1 draw against Royal Antwerp.

On 31 August 2025, he scored in the 2–0 home win over Belgian powerhouse Anderlecht.

== International career ==
In March 2025, Ralf Rangnick, the manager of the Austria national team, called up Florucz for the 2024–25 UEFA Nations League play-offs against Serbia.

== Personal life ==
Florucz was born in Austria to Romanian parents from Arad. His maternal grandfather, Mihai Mironiuc, was an international handball player for Romania.

== Career statistics ==
=== Club ===
As of match played 25 October 2026

Appearances and goals by club, season and competition
Club	Season	League			National cup (Note: Includes Croatian Cup, Slovenian Cup and Belgian Cup)		Europe		Other		Total	
Club	Season	Division	Apps	Goals	Apps	Goals	Apps	Goals	Apps	Goals	Apps	Goals
Lokomotiva	2021–22	1. HNL	7	0	1	0	—		—		8	0
Lokomotiva	2022–23	HNL	1	0	—		—		—		1	0
Lokomotiva	Total		8	0	1	0	—		—		9	0
Sesvete (loan)	2020–21	1. NL	12	0	2	1	—		—		14	1
Hrvatski Dragovoljac (loan)	2020–21	1. NL	13	2	—		—		—		13	2
Jarun (loan)	2021–22	1. NL	13	6	—		—		—		13	6
Jarun (loan)	2022–23	1. NL	24	12	—		—		—		24	12
Jarun (loan)	Total		37	18	—		—		—		37	18
Olimpija Ljubljana	2023–24	Slovenian PrvaLiga	29	9	3	0	3 (Note: Appearances in UEFA Champions League)	0	—		35	9
Olimpija Ljubljana	2024–25	Slovenian PrvaLiga	29	15	3	2	11 (Note: Appearances in UEFA Conference League)	3	—		43	20
Olimpija Ljubljana	Total		58	24	6	2	14	3	—		78	29
Union Saint-Gilloise	2025–26	Belgian Pro League	24	7	4	1	5	0	1 (Note: Appearance in Belgian Super Cup)	0	34	8
Union Saint-Gilloise	2026–27	Belgian Pro League	9	5	1	1	3 (Note: Two appearances and two goals in UEFA Champions League, one appearance and one goal in UEFA Europa League)	3	1	0	14	9
Union Saint-Gilloise	Total		33	12	5	2	8	3	2	0	48	17
Career total			161	56	14	5	22	6	2	0	199	67

=== International ===
As of match played 17 November 2026

Appearances and goals by national team and year
National team	Year	Apps	Goals
Austria	2025	3	0
Austria	2026	2	0
Total		5	0

== Honours ==
Hrvatski Dragovoljac

- Croatian Second League: 2020–21

Olimpija Ljubljana

- Slovenian PrvaLiga: 2024–25

Union Saint-Gilloise

- Belgian Cup: 2025–26
- Belgian Super Cup: 2026

Individual

- Slovenian PrvaLiga Player of the Year: 2024–25
- Slovenian PrvaLiga Team of the Season: 2024–25
- Slovenian PrvaLiga top scorer: 2024–25
