= Ognjen Gnjatić =

Bosnian footballer

Personal information
- Date of birth: 16 October 1991 (age 35)
- Place of birth: Bugojno, Bosnia and Herzegovina, Yugoslavia
- Height: 1.90 m (6 ft 3 in)
- Position: Defensive midfielder

Team information
- Current team: Radomlje
- Number: 6

Youth career
- Kozara Gradiška

Senior career*
Years	Team	Apps	(Gls)
2011–2012	Kozara Gradiška	24	(0)
2012–2015	Rad	61	(0)
2015–2017	Platanias	37	(0)
2017–2019	Roda JC	43	(0)
2019–2020	Korona Kielce	39	(0)
2020–2022	Erzgebirge Aue	23	(0)
2023–	Radomlje	58	(1)

International career
2011–2012	Bosnia and Herzegovina U21	4	(0)
- * Club domestic league appearances and goals as of 25 June 2025

Ognjen Gnjatić (Serbian Cyrillic: Огњен Гњатић, pronounced [ǒɡɲeŋ ɡɲǎːtitɕ]; (Note: In isolation, Ognjen is pronounced [ǒɡɲen].) born 16 October 1991) is a Bosnian professional footballer who plays as a defensive midfielder for Radomlje.

== Club career ==
Born in Bugojno, SR Bosnia and Herzegovina, Gnjatić played with FK Kozara Gradiška in the 2011–12 Bosnian Premier League.

In summer 2012, Gnjatić moved to Serbia and signed for top division side FK Rad. He made his debut in the 2012–13 Serbian SuperLiga on 10 August 2012, in the first round match against FK Radnički 1923.

== International career ==
Gnjatić was a member of the Bosnia and Herzegovina under-21 team.
