= Agustín Doffo =

Argentine footballer (born 1995)

Personal information
- Date of birth: 25 May 1995 (age 31)
- Place of birth: Oliva, Argentina
- Height: 1.79 m (5 ft 10 in)
- Positions: Attacking midfielder; winger

Team information
- Current team: Olimpija Ljubljana
- Number: 34

Youth career
- IDSC
- 2010: Embalse
- 2010–2015: Vélez Sarsfield

Senior career*
Years	Team	Apps	(Gls)
2015–2018	Vélez Sarsfield	19	(0)
2016–2017	→ Villarreal B (loan)	5	(1)
2018	Chapecoense	15	(3)
2019	O'Higgins	18	(1)
2020	Colón	0	(0)
2020–2022	Tuzla City	44	(1)
2022–	Olimpija Ljubljana	123	(0)
- * Club domestic league appearances and goals as of 15 August 2026

Agustín Doffo (born 25 May 1995) is an Argentine professional footballer who plays as a midfielder for Slovenian PrvaLiga club Olimpija Ljubljana.

== Club career ==
Born in Oliva, Córdoba, Doffo joined Vélez Sarsfield's youth setup in 2010. He made his first team debut on 23 May 2016, coming on as a late substitute for fellow youth graduate Nicolás Delgadillo in a 3–1 away win against Banfield in the Primera División championship; he also provided an assist for Mariano Pavone's last goal.

In August 2016 Doffo moved to Villarreal, signing a one-year loan deal and being assigned to the reserves in Segunda División B.

On 29 May 2022, he signed a two-year deal with Slovenian PrvaLiga side Olimpija Ljubljana.
