= Marcel Ratnik =

Slovenian footballer (born 2003)

Personal information
- Date of birth: 23 December 2003 (age 22)
- Place of birth: Slovenia
- Height: 1.86 m (6 ft 1 in)
- Positions: Centre-back; full-back

Team information
- Current team: Al Ain
- Number: 14

Youth career
- –2013: Mura 05
- 2013–2017: Mura
- 2017–2018: Maribor
- 2018–2021: Olimpija Ljubljana

Senior career*
Years	Team	Apps	(Gls)
2021–2025	Olimpija Ljubljana	110	(8)
2025–	Al Ain	23	(0)

International career^{‡}
2017–2018	Slovenia U15	6	(0)
2018–2019	Slovenia U16	9	(2)
2019	Slovenia U17	8	(0)
2021	Slovenia U18	2	(2)
2021	Slovenia U19	6	(0)
2022–2025	Slovenia U21	15	(0)
2024–	Slovenia	4	(0)
- * Club domestic league appearances and goals as of 17 May 2026 ‡ National team caps and goals as of 7 June 2026

Marcel Ratnik (born 23 December 2003) is a Slovenian professional footballer who plays as a defender for UAE Pro League club Al Ain and the Slovenia national team.

== Club career ==
=== Olimpija Ljubljana ===
Ratnik started his senior career with Olimpija Ljubljana, playing in the Slovenian PrvaLiga, the top tier of Slovenian football. He signed his first contract with Olimpija in March 2021, valid until 2023. He had to wait until July of that year to make his debut for the club, starting in a 1–1 draw against Radomlje. Ratnik would go on to make eleven more starts that season for a total of 17 league appearances alongside one appearance in the UEFA Europa Conference League third qualifying round against Portuguese club Santa Clara. During the season, he signed another new contract with Olimpija, this time until June 2025.

The next season, at the age of 18, Ratnik established himself as a starter and crucial player for Olimpija. He scored his first goal for the club in a 1–0 home win against Bravo in July 2022. Over the course of the season, Ratnik played a crucial role in his side lifting the league trophy in convincing fashion, making 31 appearances in the league campaign, as well as winning the Slovenian Cup to complete the double.

Ratnik played 49 times the following season, scoring 5 times, a career best. He made 34 appearances in the PrvaLiga and 14 appearances in European competitions, helping Olimpija to their first ever European group stage appearance.

In December 2024, Ratnik became the youngest ever player in Olimpija's history to reach 100 appearances in the Slovenian top division, at the age of 20 years and 350 days. He made 43 appearances in all competitions for Olimpija that season and, as captain, led the club to the league title.

=== Al Ain ===
In June 2025, Ratnik joined UAE Pro League team Al Ain on a four-year contract for a reported transfer fee of €2.2 million.

== International career ==
Ratnik represented Slovenia at all youth international levels from under-15 to under-21.

He made his debut for the senior Slovenia national team on 20 January 2024 in a friendly against the United States.

== Style of play ==
Ratnik can play as a full-back, but is predominantly a centre-back. He is known for his confidence with the ball at his feet, with Slovenian football portal Nogomania describing him as calm, sovereign, always alert and versatile. Due to the belief of Albert Riera, his coach during the 2022–23 season, that a player must be able to play in three different positions, Ratnik even played on the wing for a game towards the end of the season against Maribor.

== Career statistics ==
=== Club ===
As of 22 May 2026

Appearances and goals by club, season and competition
Club	Season	League			National cup (Note: Includes Slovenian Cup, UAE President's Cup)		League cup (Note: Includes UAE League Cup)		Continental		Other		Total	
Club	Season	Division	Apps	Goals	Apps	Goals	Apps	Goals	Apps	Goals	Apps	Goals	Apps	Goals
Olimpija Ljubljana	2021–22	Slovenian PrvaLiga	17	0	0	0	—		1 (Note: Appearances in UEFA Conference League)	0	—		18	0
Olimpija Ljubljana	2022–23	Slovenian PrvaLiga	31	1	5	0	—		2	0	—		38	1
Olimpija Ljubljana	2023–24	Slovenian PrvaLiga	34	5	1	0	—		14 (Note: Six appearances in UEFA Champions League, two appearances in UEFA Europa League, six appearances in UEFA Europa Conference League)	0	—		49	5
Olimpija Ljubljana	2024–25	Slovenian PrvaLiga	28	2	2	0	—		13	0	—		43	2
Olimpija Ljubljana	Total		110	8	8	0	0	0	30	0	0	0	148	8
Al Ain	2025–26	UAE Pro League	23	0	4	0	6	0	—		1 (Note: Appearance in FIFA Club World Cup)	0	34	0
Career total			133	8	12	0	6	0	30	0	1	0	182	8

=== International ===
As of match played 7 June 2026

Appearances and goals by national team and year
National team	Year	Apps	Goals
Slovenia	2024	1	0
Slovenia	2025	0	0
Slovenia	2026	3	0
Total		4	0

== Honours ==
Olimpija Ljubljana

- Slovenian PrvaLiga: 2022–23, 2024–25
- Slovenian Cup: 2022–23

Al Ain

- UAE Pro League: 2025–26
- UAE President's Cup: 2025–26
