= Oliver Bogatinov =

Slovenian association football manager (born 1978)

Personal information
- Date of birth: 26 September 1978 (age 48)
- Place of birth: Jesenice, SFR Yugoslavia
- Position: Forward

Team information
- Current team: Tikvesh (head coach)

Senior career*
Years	Team	Apps	(Gls)
–1999	Triglav Kranj		
1999–2002	Celje	63	(19)
2002–2005	Koper	50	(10)
2005–2008	Izola	39	(14)
2008	Bonifika	11	(6)

International career
1998	Slovenia U20	4	(1)

Managerial career
- 2006–2008: Izola
- 2012–2013: Mura 05
- 2017–2019: Aluminij
- 2022–2024: Radomlje
- 2024–2025: Koper
- 2025–2026: Gorica
- 2026–: Tikvesh
- * Club domestic league appearances and goals

Oliver Bogatinov (born 26 September 1978) is a Slovenian professional football manager and former player who is the manager of Macedonian First Football League club Tikvesh.

== Playing career ==
Born in Jesenice to parents of Macedonian descent, Bogatinov started his football career with Triglav Kranj. He was the top scorer of the 1997–98 Slovenian Second League with 32 goals as his team earned promotion to the Slovenian top division. Bogatinov spent the next seven seasons playing in the Slovenian top tier, making a total of 130 appearances for Triglav, Celje and Koper. He retired from professional football at the age of 26 due to injuries and focused on coaching career, although he still played semi-professional football in the Slovenian lower divisions for Izola and Bonifika.

== Managerial career ==
Bogatinov started his managerial career at Koper, where he was the coach of various youth selections. He was then a player/manager at third division side Izola, before becoming the assistant manager of Nedžad Okčić at Koper, when the team won its first ever top division title in 2009–10. Bogatinov was also the coach of Koper's under-17 team, with whom he won the national under-17 league.

In August 2012, before the Europa League play-off match against Lazio, Bogatinov took charge of Slovenian top division club Mura 05. Between 2013 and 2015, Bogatinov was working as the youth coach at Saudi club Al-Hilal SFC, his first club abroad. In 2015, he was the assistant of Marijan Pušnik at Olimpija Ljubljana. In December 2017, he took charge of Slovenian top division side Aluminij.

In March 2020, Bogatinov was appointed sports director of Slovenian team Maribor, replacing Zlatko Zahovič. He left the position in February 2021 along with head coach Mauro Camoranesi. Bogatinov was then appointed sports director of Koper, before returning to coaching in December 2022 when he was appointed as manager of Radomlje.
