= 2023–24 Slovenian PrvaLiga =

33rd season of the Slovenian PrvaLiga

Slovenian PrvaLiga
- Season: 2023–24
- Dates: 22 July 2023 – 19 May 2024
- Champions: Celje (2nd title)
- Relegated: Aluminij; Rogaška
- Champions League: Celje
- Europa League: Maribor
- Conference League: Olimpija Ljubljana; Bravo
- Matches: 180
- Goals: 505 (2.81 per match)
- Best player: Žan Karničnik
- Top goalscorer: Aljoša Matko (18 goals)
- Biggest home win: Maribor 7–0 Aluminij
- Biggest away win: Aluminij 0–5 Domžale
- Highest scoring: Aluminij 4–5 Olimpija
- Highest attendance: 10,460; Maribor 2–1 Olimpija
- Total attendance: 223,148
- Average attendance: 1,254

The 2023–24 Slovenian PrvaLiga was the 33rd edition of the Slovenian PrvaLiga since its establishment in 1991. The season began on 22 July 2023 and ended on 19 May 2024. Olimpija Ljubljana were the defending champions after winning their third title in the previous season.

Celje won their second PrvaLiga title with three rounds to go after defeating Olimpija 1–0 on 28 April 2024. As champions, they qualified for the first qualifying round of the 2024–25 UEFA Champions League. Maribor, which finished as runners-up, qualified for the first qualifying round of the 2024–25 UEFA Europa League instead of Slovenian Cup winners Rogaška, which failed to obtain competition licence and were thus relegated. The third-placed and the fourth-placed teams, Olimpija and Bravo, entered the second and first qualifying round of the 2024–25 UEFA Conference League, respectively. Aluminij were relegated to the Slovenian Second League as the bottom-placed team, together with eight-placed Rogaška.

== Teams ==
Olimpija Ljubljana entered the season as defending champions after winning their third title in the previous season. Gorica and Tabor Sežana were relegated at the end of the previous season. They were replaced by Aluminij and Rogaška, who joined the remaining eight teams this season after promotion from the Slovenian Second League. Aluminij returned to the first division after a one-year absence, while Rogaška made their PrvaLiga debut.

=== Stadiums and locations ===
Locations of the 2023–24 Slovenian PrvaLiga teams

Team	Location	Stadium	Capacity
Aluminij	Kidričevo	Aluminij Sports Park	789
Bravo	Ljubljana	Šiška Sports Park	2,308
Celje	Celje	Stadion Z'dežele	13,059
Domžale	Domžale	Domžale Sports Park	3,100
Koper	Koper	Bonifika Stadium	4,047
Maribor	Maribor	Ljudski vrt	11,709
Mura	Murska Sobota	Fazanerija City Stadium	4,506
Olimpija	Ljubljana	Stožice Stadium	16,038
Radomlje	Radomlje	Domžale Sports Park	3,100
Rogaška (Note: Rogaška played at Matija Gubec Stadium in Krško until mid-September 2023, as their stadium was still under renovations.)	Rogaška Slatina	Rogaška Slatina Sports Centre	1,000

=== Managerial changes ===
Team	Outgoing manager	Date of vacancy	Position in table	Incoming manager	Date of appointment
Celje	(Ukraine) Roman Pylypchuk	18 July 2023	Pre-season	(Spain) Albert Riera	20 July 2023
Domžale	(Slovenia) Simon Rožman	3 August 2023	5th	(Slovenia) Dušan Kosič	7 August 2023
Mura	(Slovenia) Dejan Grabić	14 August 2023	8th	(Serbia) Vladimir Vermezović	6 September 2023
Maribor	(Croatia) Damir Krznar	2 October 2023	5th	(Slovenia) Ante Šimundža	3 October 2023
Celje	(Spain) Albert Riera	11 October 2023	1st	(Croatia) Damir Krznar	11 October 2023
Olimpija Ljubljana	(Portugal) João Henriques	13 October 2023	3rd	(Slovenia) Zoran Zeljković	18 October 2023
Koper	(Slovenia) Zoran Zeljković	18 October 2023	2nd	(Slovenia) Safet Hadžić	18 October 2023
Koper	(Slovenia) Safet Hadžić	18 December 2023	3rd	(Slovenia) Aleksandar Radosavljević	18 December 2023
Mura	(Serbia) Vladimir Vermezović	20 February 2024	6th	(Slovenia) Anton Žlogar	21 February 2024
Radomlje	(Slovenia) Oliver Bogatinov	30 March 2024	10th	(Slovenia) Darjan Slavic	8 April 2024
Domžale	(Slovenia) Dušan Kosič	1 April 2024	7th	(Slovenia) Matej Podlogar	1 April 2024
Koper	(Slovenia) Aleksandar Radosavljević	5 April 2024	5th	(Slovenia) Oliver Bogatinov	5 April 2024
Olimpija Ljubljana	(Slovenia) Zoran Zeljković	6 May 2024	2nd	(Croatia) Goran Boromisa (caretaker)	10 May 2024

== League table ==
Pos	Team	Pld	W	D	L	GF	GA	GD	Pts	Qualification or relegation
1	Celje (C)	36	24	7	5	75	34	+41	79	Qualification for the Champions League first qualifying round
2	Maribor	36	19	10	7	67	35	+32	67	Qualification for the Europa League first qualifying round (Note: Since the 2023–24 Slovenian Cup winners (Rogaška) were denied a UEFA licence, the Europa League berth, which was originally intended for the cup winners, was transferred to the second-placed team in the league, Maribor.)
3	Olimpija Ljubljana	36	18	10	8	69	44	+25	64	Qualification for the Conference League second qualifying round
4	Bravo	36	12	14	10	42	42	0	50	Qualification for the Conference League first qualifying round
5	Koper	36	12	12	12	51	49	+2	48	
6	Mura	36	11	10	15	42	55	−13	43 (Note: Ranked on head-to-head points: Mura 9, Domžale 3.)	
7	Domžale	36	13	4	19	52	60	−8	43	
8	Rogaška (R)	36	10	6	20	37	64	−27	36	Relegation to fourth tier (Note: Rogaška did not obtain a competition licence and were relegated to the fourth division.)
9	Radomlje	36	7	12	17	33	51	−18	33	
10	Aluminij (R)	36	8	7	21	37	71	−34	31	Relegation to Slovenian Second League

Source: RSSSF
Rules for classification: 1) Points; 2) Head-to-head points; 3) Head-to-head goal difference; 4) Head-to-head goals scored; 5) Goal difference; 6) Goals scored
(C) Champions; (R) Relegated

== Results ==
=== First half of the season ===
Home \ Away	ALU	BRA	CEL	DOM	KOP	MAR	MUR	OLI	RAD	ROG
Aluminij		1–1	2–2	0–5	3–2	1–0	0–1	4–5	0–2	1–2
Bravo	2–0		0–2	3–2	0–3	2–1	2–0	4–2	0–2	2–0
Celje	1–3	2–1		3–1	2–0	2–0	5–0	0–1	1–0	2–0
Domžale	2–1	1–1	1–2		1–2	1–2	0–2	0–2	3–0	3–0
Koper	4–1	1–1	1–1	0–1		3–3	1–3	2–1	1–0	3–0
Maribor	1–0	2–1	0–1	1–1	0–1		3–1	3–1	3–1	2–1
Mura	1–0	1–1	0–2	2–3	2–2	0–0		1–3	0–2	3–1
Olimpija	0–0	1–1	2–4	2–1	1–1	2–1	1–0		1–1	5–0
Radomlje	0–2	1–2	0–4	3–1	1–1	0–4	1–1	0–2		1–3
Rogaška	0–1	2–0	0–4	1–2	0–1	2–2	0–2	0–2	1–1	

Source: PrvaLiga
Legend: Blue = home team win; Yellow = draw; Red = away team win.

=== Second half of the season ===
Home \ Away	ALU	BRA	CEL	DOM	KOP	MAR	MUR	OLI	RAD	ROG
Aluminij		1–1	1–3	1–3	1–2	0–2	2–0	0–4	1–1	0–1
Bravo	0–0		0–0	1–3	0–0	1–1	1–1	1–1	1–1	3–2
Celje	2–2	2–1		2–3	2–1	1–1	4–1	1–0	2–1	4–1
Domžale	2–0	1–3	2–1		1–0	1–1	3–5	1–3	1–1	0–1
Koper	2–1	0–0	1–3	3–1		1–1	2–1	2–4	0–1	1–2
Maribor	7–0	2–1	3–1	3–0	3–1		5–0	2–1	1–0	3–0
Mura	3–1	1–2	1–3	1–0	1–1	3–0		1–1	0–0	1–2
Olimpija	5–0	0–1	1–1	1–0	3–2	1–2	0–0		2–2	2–2
Radomlje	1–2	0–1	1–1	2–0	1–1	2–2	1–2	1–3		1–0
Rogaška	1–4	2–0	1–2	4–1	2–2	0–0	0–0	2–3	1–0	

Source: PrvaLiga
Legend: Blue = home team win; Yellow = draw; Red = away team win.

== PrvaLiga play-off ==
The ninth-placed club of the PrvaLiga, Radomlje, should have played a two-legged play-off against the second-placed club from the 2023–24 Slovenian Second League, Nafta 1903, for the final place in the following season's PrvaLiga. However, the Football Association of Slovenia cancelled the play-offs on 22 May 2024, as Rogaška, which finished eighth in the PrvaLiga, did not obtain a competition licence and were relegated. As a consequence, both Radomlje and Nafta 1903 earned a place in the 2024–25 Slovenian PrvaLiga season.

23 May 2024

Nafta 1903	Cancelled	Radomlje

Lendava Sports Park, Lendava
26 May 2024

Radomlje	Cancelled	Nafta 1903

Domžale Sports Park, Domžale

== Statistics ==
=== Top scorers ===
Rank	Player	Club	Goals
1	(Slovenia) Aljoša Matko	Celje	18
2	(Austria) Arnel Jakupović	Maribor	17
3	(Algeria) Hillal Soudani	Maribor	15
4	(Croatia) Patrik Mijić	Rogaška	11
4	(Slovenia) Matej Poplatnik	Bravo	11
6	(Slovenia) Amadej Maroša	Mura	10
6	(Portugal) Rui Pedro	Olimpija Ljubljana	10
8	(Austria) Raul Florucz	Olimpija Ljubljana	9
8	(France) Timothé Nkada	Koper	9
8	(Slovenia) Jošt Pišek	Domžale	9
8	(Bosnia and Herzegovina) Madžid Šošić	Radomlje	9

== Awards ==
=== Monthly awards ===
PrvaLiga Player of the Month

Month	Player	Club
July	(Austria) Arnel Jakupović	Maribor
August	(Slovenia) Aljoša Matko	Celje
September	(Slovenia) Martin Pečar	Bravo
October	(Slovenia) Žan Karničnik	Celje
November	(Portugal) Rui Pedro	Olimpija Ljubljana
December	(Slovenia) Jan Repas	Maribor
February	(Slovenia) Josip Iličić	Maribor
March	(Croatia) Patrik Mijić	Rogaška
April	(Algeria) Hillal Soudani	Maribor
May	(Algeria) Hillal Soudani	Maribor

=== Annual awards ===
PrvaLiga Player of the Year

- Žan Karničnik

PrvaLiga Young player of the Year

- Yegor Prutsev

PrvaLiga Manager of the Year

- Ante Šimundža

=== PrvaLiga Team of the Season ===
Player	Team	Position	Ref.
(Slovenia) Ažbe Jug	Maribor	Goalkeeper	
(Slovenia) Žan Karničnik	Celje	Defender	
(Slovenia) Sven Šoštarič Karič	Maribor	Defender	
(Slovenia) David Zec	Celje	Defender	
(Slovenia) Marcel Ratnik	Olimpija Ljubljana	Defender	
(Slovenia) Josip Iličić	Maribor	Midfielder	
(Algeria) Hillal Soudani	Maribor	Midfielder	
(Slovenia) Jan Repas	Maribor	Midfielder	
(Croatia) Patrik Mijić	Rogaška	Forward	
(Slovenia) Aljoša Matko	Celje	Forward	
(Austria) Arnel Jakupović	Maribor	Forward	

== See also ==
- 2023–24 Slovenian Football Cup
