= 2024–25 Slovenian PrvaLiga =

34th season of the Slovenian PrvaLiga

Slovenian PrvaLiga
- Season: 2024–25
- Dates: 19 July 2024 – 25 May 2025
- Champions: Olimpija Ljubljana (4th title)
- Relegated: Nafta 1903
- Champions League: Olimpija Ljubljana
- Europa League: Celje (cup winners)
- Conference League: Maribor; Koper
- Matches: 180
- Goals: 498 (2.77 per match)
- Best player: Raul Florucz
- Top goalscorer: Raul Florucz (15 goals)
- Biggest home win: Celje 9–1 Radomlje
- Biggest away win: Nafta 1903 1–6 Celje
- Highest scoring: Celje 9–1 Radomlje
- Highest attendance: 9,845; Olimpija 0–0 Maribor
- Lowest attendance: 100; Radomlje 2–0 Bravo
- Total attendance: 248,958
- Average attendance: 1,383

The 2024–25 Slovenian PrvaLiga was the 34th edition of the Slovenian PrvaLiga since its establishment in 1991. The season began on 19 July 2024 and ended on 25 May 2025.

Olimpija Ljubljana won the league, clinching their fourth PrvaLiga title. As champions, they qualified for the first qualifying round of the 2025–26 UEFA Champions League.

== Teams ==
Celje entered the season as defending champions after winning their second title in the previous season. Rogaška and Aluminij were relegated at the end of the previous season. They were replaced by Primorje and Nafta 1903, who joined the remaining eight teams this season after winning promotion from the Slovenian Second League.

=== Stadiums and locations ===
Locations of the 2024–25 Slovenian PrvaLiga teams

Team	Location	Stadium	Capacity
Bravo (Note: Bravo also played some home matches at Stožice Stadium.)	Ljubljana	Šiška Sports Park	2,308
Celje	Celje	Stadion Z'dežele	13,059
Domžale	Domžale	Domžale Sports Park	3,100
Koper	Koper	Bonifika Stadium	4,047
Maribor	Maribor	Ljudski vrt	11,709
Mura	Murska Sobota	Fazanerija City Stadium	4,506
Nafta 1903	Lendava	Lendava Sports Park	2,000
Olimpija Ljubljana	Ljubljana	Stožice Stadium	16,038
Primorje (Note: Primorje also played some home matches at Nova Gorica Sports Park in Nova Gorica.)	Ajdovščina	Ajdovščina City Stadium	1,630
Radomlje	Radomlje	Domžale Sports Park	3,100

=== Managerial changes ===
Team	Outgoing manager	Date of vacancy	Position in table	Incoming manager	Date of appointment
Celje	(Croatia) Damir Krznar	28 July 2024	5th	(Spain) Albert Riera	29 July 2024
Domžale	(Slovenia) Erik Merdanović	25 August 2024	10th	(Slovenia) Dejan Dončić	2 September 2024
Mura	(Slovenia) Anton Žlogar	5 September 2024	5th	(Slovenia) Oskar Drobne	7 September 2024
Maribor	(Slovenia) Ante Šimundža	8 October 2024	2nd	(Slovenia) Boštjan Cesar	14 October 2024
Mura	(Slovenia) Oskar Drobne	27 February 2025	6th	(Slovenia) Matjaž Kek Jr.	27 February 2025
Koper	(Slovenia) Oliver Bogatinov	6 March 2025	4th	(Slovenia) Slaviša Stojanović	19 March 2025
Mura	(Slovenia) Matjaž Kek Jr.	25 April 2025	7th	(Serbia) Ivan Kurtušić	25 April 2025
Domžale	(Slovenia) Dejan Dončić	28 April 2025	10th	(Slovenia) Anton Žlogar	29 April 2025

== League table ==
Pos	Team	Pld	W	D	L	GF	GA	GD	Pts	Qualification or relegation
1	Olimpija Ljubljana (C)	36	21	11	4	63	20	+43	74	Qualification for the Champions League first qualifying round
2	Maribor	36	19	10	7	64	32	+32	67	Qualification for the Conference League second qualifying round
3	Koper	36	19	9	8	60	35	+25	66	Qualification for the Conference League first qualifying round
4	Celje	36	17	10	9	76	51	+25	61	Qualification for the Europa League first qualifying round (Note: Celje qualified for the Europa League first qualifying round by winning the 2024–25 Slovenian Football Cup.)
5	Bravo	36	14	13	9	52	44	+8	55	
6	Primorje	36	11	10	15	41	61	−20	43	
7	Mura	36	9	8	19	37	51	−14	35 (Note: Ranked on head-to-head points: Mura 9, Radomlje 3.)	
8	Radomlje	36	10	5	21	37	69	−32	35	
9	Domžale (O)	36	7	8	21	35	66	−31	29	Qualification for the relegation play-offs
10	Nafta 1903 (R)	36	6	10	20	33	69	−36	28	Relegation to Slovenian Second League

Source: PrvaLiga
Rules for classification: 1) Points; 2) Head-to-head points; 3) Head-to-head goal difference; 4) Head-to-head goals scored; 5) Goal difference; 6) Goals scored
(C) Champions; (O) Play-off winners; (R) Relegated

== Results ==
=== First half of the season ===
Home \ Away	BRA	CEL	DOM	KOP	MAR	MUR	NAF	OLI	PRI	RAD
Bravo		3–2	0–0	1–0	0–1	2–1	2–0	1–1	4–0	0–0
Celje	2–1		2–2	1–0	2–1	4–3	3–1	0–1	0–3	4–2
Domžale	2–3	0–3		0–3	0–3	1–2	2–1	0–0	0–0	1–4
Koper	3–2	0–0	4–0		1–1	0–0	3–0	0–1	3–4	1–0
Maribor	1–1	1–2	4–1	2–0		2–1	4–0	1–1	4–1	1–0
Mura	2–3	1–0	0–1	1–3	1–1		1–0	0–1	4–0	1–0
Nafta 1903	0–1	0–0	5–2	1–2	0–3	0–0		0–1	0–3	2–1
Olimpija Ljubljana	1–1	2–2	3–0	0–1	0–0	4–0	2–0		2–0	2–0
Primorje	1–0	1–3	2–1	0–2	2–0	1–0	1–1	0–2		0–1
Radomlje	1–1	4–2	1–0	0–1	1–1	2–4	2–0	0–2	1–1	

Source: PrvaLiga
Legend: Blue = home team win; Yellow = draw; Red = away team win.

=== Second half of the season ===
Home \ Away	BRA	CEL	DOM	KOP	MAR	MUR	NAF	OLI	PRI	RAD
Bravo		1–2	3–3	2–1	1–1	1–1	1–1	0–0	3–1	4–0
Celje	2–3		1–1	2–3	1–2	2–1	3–2	3–3	2–2	9–1
Domžale	2–2	0–1		2–3	1–0	0–1	2–0	3–1	1–1	1–2
Koper	1–0	1–1	3–0		1–1	1–0	0–0	1–2	1–1	3–1
Maribor	2–3	1–1	2–1	4–2		2–0	0–1	1–0	3–1	4–0
Mura	1–1	0–0	0–2	1–3	1–2		0–0	1–1	3–1	2–0
Nafta 1903	0–1	1–6	3–2	1–5	1–1	4–2		1–1	2–2	2–1
Olimpija Ljubljana	3–0	2–0	2–0	1–1	1–2	2–1	3–0		5–0	5–0
Primorje	3–0	0–5	0–1	1–1	2–1	2–0	2–2	0–2		1–1
Radomlje	2–0	1–3	1–0	1–2	0–4	2–0	4–1	0–3	0–1	

Source: PrvaLiga
Legend: Blue = home team win; Yellow = draw; Red = away team win.

== PrvaLiga play-off ==
A two-legged play-off between the ninth-placed team from the PrvaLiga, Domžale, and the second-placed team from the 2024–25 Slovenian Second League, Triglav Kranj, was played. The winner earned a place in the 2025–26 PrvaLiga season.

29 May 2025
20:00 UTC+2

Domžale	1–3	Triglav Kranj
Kranjčič 89'	Report	Cukjati 54'; Piskule 60', 71'

Domžale Sports Park, Domžale
Attendance: 1,800
Referee: Alen Borošak
1 June 2025
18:00 UTC+2

Triglav Kranj	1–4	Domžale
Ovsenek 90+1'	Report	Piskule 16' (o.g.); Vučkić 18', 33'; Mlakar 78'

Kranj Sports Centre, Kranj
Attendance: 2,000
Referee: Aleksandar Matković

Domžale won 5–4 on aggregate.

== Statistics ==
=== Top scorers ===
Rank	Player	Club	Goals
1	(Austria) Raul Florucz	Olimpija Ljubljana	15
2	(Croatia) Dario Vizinger	Mura	14
3	(Slovenia) Matej Poplatnik	Bravo	13
3	(Slovenia) Danijel Šturm	Domžale	13
5	(Australia) Tomi Juric	Koper	12
6	(Australia) Deni Jurić	Koper	11
6	(Ghana) Benjamin Tetteh	Maribor	11
8	(Lithuania) Armandas Kučys	Celje	10
8	(Slovenia) Svit Sešlar	Celje	10
10	(Slovenia) Amadej Maroša	Mura	9
10	(Algeria) Hillal Soudani	Maribor	9

== Awards ==
=== Monthly awards ===
PrvaLiga Player of the Month

Month	Player	Club
July	(Austria) Arnel Jakupović	Maribor
August	(Austria) Raul Florucz	Olimpija Ljubljana
September	(Slovenia) Jan Repas	Maribor
October	(Austria) Raul Florucz	Olimpija Ljubljana
November	(Slovenia) Žan Bešir	Primorje
December	(Austria) Marko Božić	Maribor
February	(Slovenia) Matej Poplatnik	Bravo
March	(Algeria) Hillal Soudani	Maribor
April	(Slovenia) Aljoša Matko	Celje
May	(Slovenia) Svit Sešlar	Celje

=== Annual awards ===
PrvaLiga Player of the Year

- Raul Florucz

PrvaLiga Young player of the Year

- Svit Sešlar

PrvaLiga Manager of the Year

- Víctor Sánchez

=== PrvaLiga Team of the Season ===
Player	Team	Position	Ref.
(Slovenia) Matevž Vidovšek	Olimpija Ljubljana	Goalkeeper	
(Slovenia) Žan Karničnik	Celje	Defender	
(Tunisia) Omar Rekik	Maribor	Defender	
(France) Ahmed Sidibé	Koper	Defender	
(Slovenia) Marcel Ratnik	Olimpija Ljubljana	Defender	
(Slovenia) Svit Sešlar	Celje	Midfielder	
(Argentina) Agustín Doffo	Olimpija Ljubljana	Midfielder	
(Slovenia) Tamar Svetlin	Celje	Midfielder	
(Algeria) Hillal Soudani	Maribor	Forward	
(Austria) Raul Florucz	Olimpija Ljubljana	Forward	
(Ghana) Benjamin Tetteh	Maribor	Forward	

== See also ==
- 2024–25 Slovenian Football Cup
