= Domžale Sports Park =

Multi-purpose stadium in Domžale, Slovenia

- Interior of the stadium in 2014
- Interactive map of Domžale Sports Park
- Full name: Športni park Domžale
- Location: Domžale, Slovenia
- Coordinates: 46°8′13″N 14°36′8″E
- Owner: Municipality of Domžale
- Operator: Zavod za šport in rekreacijo Domžale
- Capacity: 3,100
- Surface: Grass
- Record attendance: 3,100
- Field size: 105 by 68 metres (115 by 74 yards)

Construction
- Built: 1948
- Renovated: 1976, 1997, 1999, 2004, 2006
- Expanded: 2003–2004

Tenant
- NK Radomlje

Domžale Sports Park (Slovene: Športni park Domžale) or Domžale Stadium (Slovene: Stadion Domžale) is a multi-purpose stadium located in Domžale, Slovenia. It is currently used mostly for football matches and is the home ground of NK Radomlje for their matches in the Slovenian First League. It was also the home stadium of NK Domžale until 2026, when the club withdrew from the top division and was dissolved due to financial problems.

The stadium was built in 1948 and has a capacity for 3,100 spectators. It was renovated and modernized in 1997 and 1999. Work on the new West Stand started in October 2003 and was finished in April 2004. In June 2006, the stadium received floodlights, mounted on four concrete towers and placed at each corner of the stadium.

== National team matches ==
Slovenia national team matches
Date	Competition	Opponent	Result	Attendance
7 February 2007	Friendly	Estonia	1–0	2,900

== See also ==
- List of football stadiums in Slovenia
