= List of events held in the Stožice Arena =

This is the complete list of all entertainment events held, cancelled and announced to be held in the Stožice Arena.

== Entertainment events ==
Entertainment events at the Stožice Arena
Date	Nationality	Artists	References
2010
7 October	Spain	José Carreras	
12 October	Canada	Leonard Cohen	
15 November	United Kingdom	Joe Cocker	
17 December	France	David Guetta	
2011
10 June	United Kingdom	Sting (Symphonicity Tour)	
11 November	United Kingdom	Elton John	
10 December	Bosnia and Herzegovina / Serbia	Zdravko Čolić	
15 December	France	David Guetta	
17 December	Croatia	Parni valjak	
2012
19 May	Bosnia and Herzegovina / Serbia	Lepa Brena	
16 September	United Kingdom	Il Divo	
2013
30 April	Germany	Rammstein	
4 May	United Kingdom	Mark Knopfler	
30 May	Croatia	Severina (Dobrodošao u klub Tour)	
25 July	Canada	Leonard Cohen	
9 November	Slovenia	Perpetuum Jazzile	
7 December	Croatia	Parni Valjak	
2014
26 September	United Kingdom	Il Divo	
6 November	Canada	Michael Bublé	
16 November	United States	OneRepublic (Native Tour, opening act: Kongos)	
14 December	Canada / United Kingdom	Bryan Adams	
2015
14 Februar	Bosnia and Herzegovina	Dino Merlin	
25 June	United States	Bob Dylan	
22 September	Italy	Eros Ramazzotti	
2 October	Slovenia	Big Foot Mama	
17 October	Serbia	Željko Joksimović	
2016
4 March	/	Radio Aktual's Women's Day: (Jasmin Stavros, Crvena Jabuka, Minea, Pop Design, and Gazde)	
8 October	Italy	Zucchero	
15 November	France	Jean Michel Jarre	
19 November	Italy	Andrea Bocelli	
6 December	Slovenia	Siddharta	
2017
18 March	Croatia	Prljavo kazalište	
7 April	Croatia / Slovenia	2Cellos	
8 April	Croatia / Slovenia	2Cellos	
14 May	United Kingdom	Depeche Mode (Global Spirit Tour, opening act: The Raveonettes)	
6 June	United States	Green Day	
9 June	Croatia	Oliver Dragojević & Gibonni	
14 June	Netherlands	André Rieu	
20 October	Slovenia	Pankrti	
30 October	Australia	Nick Cave	
18 November	Serbia	Riblja Čorba	
25 December	Slovenia	Magnifico	
2018
15 February	Bosnia and Herzegovina	Plavi Orkestar	
9 March	Bosnia and Herzegovina	Goran Bregović + Tifa & Alen Islamović as 'Bijelo Dugme'	
3 April	Argentina	Soy Luna	
4 April	Argentina	Soy Luna	
12 May	Spain	Enrique Iglesias	
13 May	Spain	Enrique Iglesias	
25 May	Serbia	Đorđe Balašević	
8 June	Germany	Scorpions (Crazy World Tour)	
22 November	Canada / United Kingdom	Bryan Adams (Ultimate Tour)	
7 December	Bosnia and Herzegovina / Serbia	Neda Ukraden	
15 December	Serbia	Ceca & Aca Lukas	
25 December	Slovenia	Magnifico	
2019
14 February	Bosnia and Herzegovina / Serbia	Zdravko Čolić	
8 March	/	Radio Aktual's Women's Day: (Ivan Zak, Grupa Vigor, Marko Škugor, Jole, Nina Pušlar, and Pravila igre)	
10 March	Spain	José Carreras	
27 April	United States	Lenny Kravitz	
9 May	Serbia	Željko Joksimović	
24 May	Netherlands	André Rieu	
4 June	United Kingdom	Sting (My Songs Tour, opening act: James Walsh)	
18 June	United Kingdom	Tom Jones	
29 June	United Kingdom	Mark Knopfler	
30 October	Germany	Scooter	
15 November	Croatia	Petar Grašo	
23 November	Italy	Eros Ramazzotti	
13 December	Slovenia	Ritem mladosti 2019: (Big Foot Mama, Tabu, Peter Lovšin, Modrijani, Neisha, Klemen Klemen, Valentino Kanzyani, Perpetuum Jazzile, and Joker Out)	
21 December	Croatia	Severina	
25 December	Slovenia	Magnifico	
2020
1 March	Colombia	Maluma	
2022
4 March	/	Radio Aktual's Women's Day: (Zdravko Škender, Tomislav Bralić & Klapa Intrade, Manca Špik & Isaac Palma, Maligani, Luka Basi, and Grupa Vigor)	
10 April	Germany	Hans Zimmer	
6 May	Australia	5 Seconds of Summer (opening act: Hinds)	
11 May	United States	OneRepublic (opening act: Jessia)	
20 May	Slovenia	Big Foot Mama	
25 May	Croatia / Slovenia	2Cellos	
26 May	Croatia / Slovenia	2Cellos	
12 July	United Kingdom	Judas Priest (opening act: The Dead Daisies)	
8 October	Italy	Andrea Bocelli	
2 December	/	Aktual's 15th Birthday: (Jasmin Stavros, Lidija Bačić, Klapa Rišpet, Rok 'n' Band, Luka Nižetić, Vesna Pisarović, and Jole)	
4 December	Canada / United Kingdom	Bryan Adams	
25 December	Slovenia	Magnifico	
28 December	Bosnia and Herzegovina	Goran Bregović + Tifa & Alen Islamović as 'Bijelo Dugme' (opening acts: Soulfingers, Balkan Boys)	
2023
3 March	/	Radio Aktual's Women's Day: (Mladen Grdović, Lana Jurčević, Novi fosili, Miran Rudan, Marko Škugor, Nuša Derenda, Siniša Žunec, and Klapa Šufit)	
22 April	Bosnia and Herzegovina	Halid Bešlić	
28 May	United Kingdom	Iron Maiden (The Future Past World Tour, opening act: The Raven Age)	
6 October	Slovenia	Joker Out	
1 December	/	Aktual's 16th Birthday: (Dražen Zečić, Jan Plestenjak, Tanja Žagar, Goran Karan, Davor Borno, and Klapa Kampanel)	
16 December	Slovenia	Nina Pušlar	
2024
1 March	Bosnia and Herzegovina	Dino Merlin	
2 March	Bosnia and Herzegovina	Dino Merlin	
10 May	Serbia	Aleksandra Prijović (Od istoka do zapada Tour, guest: Senidah)	
19 May	United Kingdom	Rod Stewart	
29 May	United Kingdom	Sting (My Songs Tour)	
16 November	Netherlands	André Rieu and the Johann Strauss Orchestra	
20 December	Italy	Laura Pausini (World Tour 2023-2024)	
2025
31 January	United States	Pantera	
8 March	Bosnia and Herzegovina / Serbia	Lepa Brena	
21 March	Bosnia and Herzegovina	Plavi Orkestar	
4 April	Bosnia and Herzegovina / Serbia	Zdravko Čolić	
23 April	Germany	David Garrett	
4 October	Slovenia	Mi2	
10 October	Croatia	Prljavo Kazalište	
8 November	Slovenia	Siddharta	
27 November	Netherlands	André Rieu and the Johann Strauss Orchestra	
13 December	Slovenia	Senidah	
20 December	Slovenia	Ansambel Saša Avsenika	
25 December	Slovenia	Magnifico	
2026
27 March	South Korea	K-Pop Forever!	
16 April	Canada	Cirque du Soleil (Ovo show)	
17 April	Canada	Cirque du Soleil (Ovo show)	
18 April	Canada	Cirque du Soleil (Ovo show)	
19 April	Canada	Cirque du Soleil (Ovo show)	
8 May	Croatia	Jakov Jozinović	
9 May	Croatia	Jakov Jozinović	
20 November	United Kingdom	Sarah Brightman	
21 November	Netherlands	André Rieu and the Johann Strauss Orchestra	
12 December	Canada / United Kingdom	Bryan Adams	
