= SpaceDent =

University of Ljubljana space science experiment

- Topic: Space dentistry
- Location: Bordeaux–Mérignac Airport, France
- Campaign: 20. November 2023 - 1. December 2023
- Nation: Slovenia
- Organization: European space agency; University of Ljubljana
- Status: Closed
- Website: https://www.spacedentproject.com/

SpaceDent was a research project conducted by students of the University of Ljubljana, Slovenia, as part of the 83rd parabolic flight campaign of the European Space Agency (ESA). During the experiment, they simulated the first tooth preparation and dental filling placement in weightlessness. The project explored the feasibility of performing dental procedures in microgravity conditions. The experiment module is part of the permanent exhibition at Herman Potočnik Noordung Center of Space Technologies in Vitanje.

== Background ==
On 6 November 2023, Slovenia applied for full membership in the European Space Agency (ESA), which coincided with the development of SpaceDent, the country's first student project under ESA. Slovenia officially joined ESA as a full member on 1 January 2025.

== Campaign ==
The experiment was conducted during the 83rd ESA Parabolic Flight Campaign, held from 20 November to 1 December 2023 at Bordeaux–Mérignac Airport in France. Two research modules, designed to simulate simplified dental clinic environments, were installed aboard the Air Zero G parabolic flight aircraft. The flights were conducted over the Atlantic Ocean. Over the course of 90 parabolic manoeuvres, each generating approximately 22 seconds of microgravity, two dental medicine students carried out the first simulated tooth preparation and dental filling placement procedures in weightless. The procedures were performed on artificial teeth inserted in dental manikin, placed within a specially designed enclosed workspace.

== Exhibition ==
After the campaign, the experiment structure became part of the permanent exhibition at the Herman Potočnik Noordung Center of Space Technologies in Vitanje.

== Awards and nominations ==
Name	Organization	Year	Ref.
Best practice award	Chamber of Commerce and Industry of Slovenia	2024	
Nomination for the Name of the week in Slovenia	Radio-Television of Slovenia	2024	
Special Commendation for Students for Special Achievements and Active Participation in Extracurricular Activities	University of Ljubljana	2024	
Engineering Spark Award	IRT Forum	2023	
