= Noordung =

Noordung may refer to:

- Herman Noordung, pseudonym of Herman Potočnik (1892–1929), Austro-Hungarian rocket engineer and pioneer of cosmonautics
- Noordung (NSK), a Slovene theater group associated with Neue Slowenische Kunst
