= 2022–23 UEFA Europa Conference League qualifying (first and second round matches) =

European football competition

This page summarises the matches of the first and second qualifying rounds of 2022–23 UEFA Europa Conference League qualifying.

Times are CEST (UTC+2), as listed by UEFA (local times, if different, are in parentheses).

== First qualifying round ==
=== Summary ===
The first legs were played on 5, 6 and 7 July, and the second legs were played on 12 and 14 July 2022.

The winners of the ties advanced to the Main Path second qualifying round. The losers were eliminated from European competitions for the season.

Team 1	Agg.	Team 2	1st leg	2nd leg
Alashkert (Armenia)	2–4	(Malta) Hamrun Spartans	1–0	1–4
Lechia Gdańsk (Poland)	6–2	(North Macedonia) Akademija Pandev	4–1	2–1
Inter Turku (Finland)	1–3	(Kosovo) Drita	1–0	0–3
Dinamo Tbilisi (Georgia (country))	4–4 (5–6 p)	(Estonia) Paide Linnameeskond	2–3	2–1 (a.e.t.)
Panevėžys (Lithuania)	0–2	(Moldova) Milsami Orhei	0–0	0–2
Laçi (Albania)	1–0	(Montenegro) Iskra	0–0	1–0
Gjilani (Kosovo)	2–3 (Note: Order of legs reversed after original draw.)	(Latvia) Liepāja	1–0	1–3
Sfîntul Gheorghe (Moldova)	2–4	(Slovenia) Mura	1–2	1–2
KuPS (Finland)	2–0	(Georgia (country)) Dila Gori	2–0	0–0
Ružomberok (Slovakia)	2–0	(Lithuania) Kauno Žalgiris	2–0	0–0
Budućnost Podgorica (Montenegro)	4–2	(Kosovo) Llapi	2–0	2–2
Gżira United (Malta)	2–1	(Andorra) Atlètic Club d'Escaldes	1–1	1–0 (a.e.t.)
Borac Banja Luka (Bosnia and Herzegovina)	3–3 (3–4 p)	(Faroe Islands) B36	2–0	1–3 (a.e.t.)
Olimpija Ljubljana (Slovenia)	3–2	(Luxembourg) Differdange 03	1–1	2–1 (a.e.t.)
St Joseph's (Gibraltar)	1–0	(Northern Ireland) Larne	0–0	1–0
UE Santa Coloma (Andorra)	1–5	(Iceland) Breiðablik	0–1	1–4
DAC Dunajská Streda (Slovakia)	5–1	(Northern Ireland) Cliftonville	2–1	3–0
Víkingur Gøta (Faroe Islands)	3–1	(Gibraltar) Europa	1–0	2–1
Bala Town (Wales)	2–2 (3–4 p)	(Republic of Ireland) Sligo Rovers	1–2	1–0 (a.e.t.)
Fola Esch (Luxembourg)	1–4	(San Marino) Tre Fiori	0–1	1–3
Dinamo Minsk (Belarus)	3–2	(Montenegro) Dečić	1–1	2–1
Tre Penne (San Marino)	0–8	(Bosnia and Herzegovina) Tuzla City	0–2	0–6
Saburtalo Tbilisi (Georgia (country))	1–1 (5–4 p)	(Albania) Partizani	0–1	1–0 (a.e.t.)
Shkëndija (North Macedonia)	4–2	(Armenia) Ararat Yerevan	2–0	2–2
Floriana (Malta)	0–1	(Moldova) Petrocub Hîncești	0–0	0–1
Pogoń Szczecin (Poland)	4–2	(Iceland) KR	4–1	0–1
HB (Faroe Islands)	2–2 (2–4 p)	(Wales) Newtown	1–0	1–2 (a.e.t.)
FCB Magpies (Gibraltar)	3–4	(Northern Ireland) Crusaders	2–1	1–3
Flora (Estonia)	3–4	(Finland) SJK	1–0	2–4 (a.e.t.)
Derry City (Republic of Ireland)	0–4	(Latvia) Riga	0–2	0–2

=== Matches ===
7 July 2022
17:00 (19:00 UTC+4)

Alashkert (Armenia)	1–0	(Malta) Hamrun Spartans
Yedigaryan 25'	Report

Vazgen Sargsyan Republican Stadium, Yerevan (Note: Alashkert played their home match at the Vazgen Sargsyan Republican Stadium, instead of their regular stadium, the Alashkert Stadium, which did not meet UEFA requirements.)
Attendance: 3,000
Referee: Vassilis Fotias (Greece)
14 July 2022
20:00

Hamrun Spartans (Malta)	4–1	(Armenia) Alashkert
Prša 55'; Guillaumier 63'; Jonny 73'; Dodô 75'	Report	Yedigaryan 48'

Centenary Stadium, Ta' Qali (Note: Hamrun Spartans are playing their home matches at the Centenary Stadium and the National Stadium in Ta' Qali, instead of their regular stadium, the Victor Tedesco Stadium, Hamrun, which did not meet UEFA requirements.)
Attendance: 1,420
Referee: Miloš Savović (Montenegro)

Hamrun Spartans won 4–2 on aggregate.

7 July 2022
20:15

Lechia Gdańsk (Poland)	4–1	(North Macedonia) Akademija Pandev
Paixão 17', 39', 66'; Zwoliński 25'	Report	Joković 81'

Stadion Gdańsk, Gdańsk
Attendance: 14,923
Referee: Nicolas Laforge (Belgium)
14 July 2022
17:00

Akademija Pandev (North Macedonia)	1–2	(Poland) Lechia Gdańsk
Mitrovski 59'	Report	Gajos 37'; Pietrzak 82'

Petar Miloševski Training Centre, Skopje (Note: Akademija Pandev played their home match at the Petar Miloševski Training Centre in Skopje, instead of their regular stadium, the Stadion Blagoj Istatov, in Strumica, which did not meet UEFA requirements.)
Attendance: 912
Referee: Daniele Chiffi (Italy)

Lechia Gdańsk won 6–2 on aggregate.

6 July 2022
17:00 (18:00 UTC+3)

Inter Turku (Finland)	1–0	(Kosovo) Drita
Niska 77'	Report

Veritas Stadion, Turku
Attendance: 2,252
Referee: Jan Petrik (Czech Republic)
12 July 2022
20:00

Drita (Kosovo)	3–0	(Finland) Inter Turku
Simonovski 2'; Muja 49', 51'	Report

Fadil Vokrri Stadium, Pristina (Note: Drita played their home matches at the Fadil Vokrri Stadium in Pristina, instead of their regular stadium, the Gjilan City Stadium, in Gjilan, which did not meet UEFA requirements.)
Attendance: 3,688
Referee: Neil Doyle (Republic of Ireland)

Drita won 3–1 on aggregate.

7 July 2022
19:00 (21:00 UTC+4)

Dinamo Tbilisi (Georgia (country))	2–3	(Estonia) Paide Linnameeskond
Skhirtladze 22'; Kharabadze 65'	Report	S. Luts 61'; Singhateh 81'; Piht 89'

Boris Paichadze Dinamo Arena, Tbilisi
Attendance: 4,530
Referee: Miloš Bošković (Montenegro)
14 July 2022
18:00 (19:00 UTC+3)

Paide Linnameeskond (Estonia)	1–2 (a.e.t.)	(Georgia (country)) Dinamo Tbilisi
Singhateh 115' (pen.)	Report	Skhirtladze 69'; Antilevsky 93'
Penalties
Mošnikov (penalty scored); Palumets (penalty scored); Tambedou (penalty scored); Saarma (penalty scored); Singhateh (penalty scored); Piht (penalty scored)	6–5	(penalty scored) Antilevsky; (penalty scored) Kutsia; (penalty scored) Barnes; (penalty scored) Camara; (penalty scored) Gabedava; (penalty missed) Kharabadze

Pärnu Rannastaadion, Pärnu (Note: Paide Linnameeskond played their home matches at the Pärnu Rannastaadion in Pärnu and the Lilleküla Stadium in Tallinn, instead of their regular stadium, the Paide linnastaadion, in Paide, which did not meet UEFA requirements.)
Attendance: 1,440
Referee: Svein Oddvar Moen (Norway)

4–4 on aggregate; Paide Linnameeskond won 6–5 on penalties.

7 July 2022
18:00 (19:00 UTC+3)

Panevėžys (Lithuania)	0–0	(Moldova) Milsami Orhei
	Report

Aukštaitija Stadium, Panevėžys
Attendance: 1,550
Referee: Mario Zebec (Croatia)
14 July 2022
18:00 (19:00 UTC+3)

Milsami Orhei (Moldova)	2–0	(Lithuania) Panevėžys
Spătaru 4'; Akpudje 54' (o.g.)	Report

District Sport Complex, Orhei
Attendance: 2,500
Referee: Vasilis Dimitriou (Cyprus)

Milsami Orhei won 2–0 on aggregate.

7 July 2022
20:00

Laçi (Albania)	0–0	(Montenegro) Iskra
	Report

Elbasan Arena, Elbasan (Note: Laçi played their home matches at the Elbasan Arena in Elbasan, instead of their regular stadium, the Laçi Stadium, in Laç, which did not meet UEFA requirements.)
Attendance: 200
Referee: Alain Durieux (Luxembourg)
14 July 2022
21:00

Iskra (Montenegro)	0–1	(Albania) Laçi
	Report	Mazrekaj 19'

DG Arena, Podgorica (Note: Iskra played their home match at the DG Arena in Podgorica, instead of their regular stadium, the Braća Velašević Stadium, in Danilovgrad, which did not meet UEFA requirements.)
Attendance: 550
Referee: Luca Pairetto (Italy)

Laçi won 1–0 on aggregate.

7 July 2022
20:00

Gjilani (Kosovo)	1–0	(Latvia) Liepāja
Dabiqaj 37'	Report

Fadil Vokrri Stadium, Pristina (Note: Gjilani played their home match at the Fadil Vokrri Stadium in Pristina, instead of their regular stadium, the Gjilan City Stadium, in Gjilan, which did not meet UEFA requirements.)
Attendance: 2,500
Referee: Robert Ian Jenkins (Wales)
14 July 2022
16:00 (17:00 UTC+3)

Liepāja (Latvia)	3–1	(Kosovo) Gjilani
Karašausks 49' (pen.); Belaković 64'; Dodô 88' (pen.)	Report	Krasniqi 51'

Daugava Stadium, Liepāja
Attendance: 1,864
Referee: Tore Hansen (Norway)

Liepāja won 3–2 on aggregate.

7 July 2022
19:00 (20:00 UTC+3)

Sfîntul Gheorghe (Moldova)	1–2	(Slovenia) Mura
Ibrahim 89'	Report	T. Cipot 65'; Calancea 73' (o.g.)

Zimbru Stadium, Chișinău (Note: Sfîntul Gheorghe played their home match at the Zimbru Stadium in Chișinău, instead of their regular stadium, the Suruceni Stadium, in Suruceni, which did not meet UEFA requirements.)
Attendance: 1,680
Referee: Vitālijs Spasjoņņikovs (Latvia)
14 July 2022
20:00

Mura (Slovenia)	2–1	(Moldova) Sfîntul Gheorghe
Petković 46'; Daku 81'	Report	Svinarenco 77'

Fazanerija City Stadium, Murska Sobota
Attendance: 3,700
Referee: Joey Kooij (Netherlands)

Mura won 4–2 on aggregate.

7 July 2022
18:00 (19:00 UTC+3)

KuPS (Finland)	2–0	(Georgia (country)) Dila Gori
Ikaunieks 32'; Väyrynen 90' (pen.)	Report

Kuopio Football Stadium, Kuopio
Attendance: 2,241
Referee: Luca Cibelli (Switzerland)
14 July 2022
19:00 (21:00 UTC+4)

Dila Gori (Georgia (country))	0–0	(Finland) KuPS
	Report

Tengiz Burjanadze Stadium, Gori
Attendance: 4,100
Referee: Sayat Karabayev (Kazakhstan)

KuPS won 2–0 on aggregate.

7 July 2022
18:30

Ružomberok (Slovakia)	2–0	(Lithuania) Kauno Žalgiris
Pilibaitis 13' (o.g.); Gerec 68'	Report

Štadión pod Čebraťom, Ružomberok
Attendance: 2,229
Referee: Ion Orlic (Moldova)
14 July 2022
18:00 (19:00 UTC+3)

Kauno Žalgiris (Lithuania)	0–0	(Slovakia) Ružomberok
	Report

Sūduva Stadium, Marijampolė (Note: Kauno Žalgiris played their home match at the Sūduva Stadium in Marijampolė, instead of their regular stadium, the Stadium of Football Academy of Kauno Žalgiris, in Kaunas, which did not meet UEFA requirements.)
Attendance: 423
Referee: Evangelos Manouchos (Greece)

Ružomberok won 2–0 on aggregate.

7 July 2022
20:30

Budućnost Podgorica (Montenegro)	2–0	(Kosovo) Llapi
Mijović 23'; Ignjatović 32'	Report

Podgorica City Stadium, Podgorica
Attendance: 3,500
Referee: Fedayi San (Switzerland)
14 July 2022
20:00

Llapi (Kosovo)	2–2	(Montenegro) Budućnost Podgorica
Firmino 45+1' (pen.); Kurtaj 71'	Report	Đukanović 23', 64'

Fadil Vokrri Stadium, Pristina (Note: Llapi played their home match at the Fadil Vokrri Stadium in Pristina, instead of their regular stadium, the Zahir Pajaziti Stadium, in Podujevo, which did not meet UEFA requirements.)
Attendance: 10,000
Referee: Mads-Kristoffer Kristoffersen (Denmark)

Budućnost Podgorica won 4–2 on aggregate.

5 July 2022
19:00

Gżira United (Malta)	1–1	(Andorra) Atlètic Club d'Escaldes
Jefferson 46'	Report	Lopez 65'

Centenary Stadium, Ta' Qali
Attendance: 308
Referee: Zaven Hovhannisyan (Armenia)
14 July 2022
19:00

Atlètic Club d'Escaldes (Andorra)	0–1 (a.e.t.)	(Malta) Gżira United
	Report	Jefferson 105'

Estadi Nacional, Andorra la Vella
Attendance: 400
Referee: Vitaliy Romanov (Ukraine)

Gżira United won 2–1 on aggregate.

7 July 2022
18:00

Borac Banja Luka (Bosnia and Herzegovina)	2–0	(Faroe Islands) B36
Tatar 37'; Piščević 84'	Report

Stadion Dr. Milan Jelić, Modriča (Note: Borac Banja Luka played their home match at the Stadion Dr. Milan Jelić in Modriča, instead of their regular stadium, the Banja Luka City Stadium, in Banja Luka.)
Attendance: 1,847
Referee: Rauf Jabarov (Azerbaijan)
14 July 2022
19:00 (18:00 UTC+1)

B36 (Faroe Islands)	3–1 (a.e.t.)	(Bosnia and Herzegovina) Borac Banja Luka
Egilsson 35', 54' (pen.), 66' (pen.)	Report	Tatar 75'
Penalties
Nattestad (penalty scored); Eriksen (penalty missed); E. Nielsen (penalty scored); Heinesen (penalty scored); Enevoldsen (penalty scored)	4–3	(penalty scored) Tatar; (penalty scored) Lukić; (penalty scored) Ćorić; (penalty missed) Piščević; (penalty missed) Subić

Gundadalur, Tórshavn
Attendance: 500
Referee: Joonas Jaanovits (Estonia)

3–3 on aggregate; B36 won 4–3 on penalties.

7 July 2022
19:00

Olimpija Ljubljana (Slovenia)	1–1	(Luxembourg) Differdange 03
Milović 62'	Report	Krefl 10' (o.g.)

Stožice Stadium, Ljubljana
Attendance: 1,150
Referee: Mykola Balakin (Ukraine)
14 July 2022
19:30

Differdange 03 (Luxembourg)	1–2 (a.e.t.)	(Slovenia) Olimpija Ljubljana
Bedouret 9'	Report	Doffo 80'; Milović 112'

Stade Municipal de la Ville de Differdange, Differdange
Attendance: 1,992
Referee: Stuart Attwell (England)

Olimpija Ljubljana won 3–2 on aggregate.

5 July 2022
19:00

St Joseph's (Gibraltar)	0–0	(Northern Ireland) Larne
	Report

Victoria Stadium, Gibraltar
Attendance: 677
Referee: Ioannis Papadopoulos (Greece)
14 July 2022
20:45 (19:45 UTC+1)

Larne (Northern Ireland)	0–1	(Gibraltar) St Joseph's
	Report	Valarino 79'

Inver Park, Larne
Attendance: 1,823
Referee: Michal Ocenáš (Slovakia)

St Joseph's won 1–0 on aggregate.

7 July 2022
17:00

UE Santa Coloma (Andorra)	0–1	(Iceland) Breiðablik
	Report	Þorvaldsson 14'

Estadi Nacional, Andorra la Vella
Attendance: 273
Referee: Veaceslav Banari (Moldova)
14 July 2022
21:15 (19:15 UTC+0)

Breiðablik (Iceland)	4–1	(Andorra) UE Santa Coloma
Þorvaldsson 45+1'; Gunnlaugsson 50' (pen.); Yeoman 64'; Steindórsson 67'	Report	Paredes 30'

Kópavogsvöllur, Kópavogur
Attendance: 1,123
Referee: Joni Hyytiä (Finland)

Breiðablik won 5–1 on aggregate.

7 July 2022
20:30

DAC Dunajská Streda (Slovakia)	2–1	(Northern Ireland) Cliftonville
Szánthó 25'; Krstović 65'	Report	Ron. Hale 28'

MOL Aréna, Dunajská Streda
Attendance: 5,030
Referee: Juan Martínez Munuera (Spain)
14 July 2022
21:00 (20:00 UTC+1)

Cliftonville (Northern Ireland)	0–3	(Slovakia) DAC Dunajská Streda
	Report	Veselovský 12'; Krstović 65', 90' (pen.)

Solitude, Belfast
Attendance: 2,000
Referee: Þorvaldur Árnason (Iceland)

DAC Dunajská Streda won 5–1 on aggregate.

6 July 2022
20:00 (19:00 UTC+1)

Víkingur Gøta (Faroe Islands)	1–0	(Gibraltar) Europa
Bárðarson 51'	Report

Tórsvøllur, Tórshavn (Note: Víkingur played their home matches at Tórsvøllur in Tórshavn, instead of their regular stadium, Sarpugerði, in Norðragøta, which did not meet UEFA requirements.)
Attendance: 722
Referee: Kristoffer Karlsson (Sweden)
14 July 2022
17:00

Europa (Gibraltar)	1–2	(Faroe Islands) Víkingur Gøta
Jiménez Sánchez 73'	Report	S. Vatnhamar 19', 45+1'

Victoria Stadium, Gibraltar
Attendance: 348
Referee: Antti Munukka (Finland)

Víkingur Gøta won 3–1 on aggregate.

7 July 2022
20:00 (19:00 UTC+1)

Bala Town (Wales)	1–2	(Republic of Ireland) Sligo Rovers
Mendes 6'	Report	Keena 28'; Mata 49'

Park Hall, Oswestry, England (Note: Bala Town played their home match at Park Hall, Oswestry, England, instead of their regular stadium, Maes Tegid, in Bala, which did not meet UEFA requirements.)
Attendance: 1,034
Referee: Jason Barcelo (Gibraltar)
14 July 2022
20:00 (19:00 UTC+1)

Sligo Rovers (Republic of Ireland)	0–1 (a.e.t.)	(Wales) Bala Town
	Report	Edwards 35'
Penalties
Cawley (penalty scored); Kirk (penalty scored); Keena (penalty scored); Blaney (penalty scored)	4–3	(penalty scored) Venables; (penalty scored) Edwards; (penalty missed) Spittle; (penalty scored) Kay; (penalty missed) Wall

The Showgrounds, Sligo
Attendance: 3,850
Referee: Jochem Kamphuis (Netherlands)

2–2 on aggregate; Sligo Rovers won 4–3 on penalties.

7 July 2022
20:00

Fola Esch (Luxembourg)	0–1	(San Marino) Tre Fiori
	Report	Núñez 85'

Stade Émile Mayrisch, Esch-sur-Alzette
Attendance: 925
Referee: Visar Kastrati (Kosovo)
14 July 2022
20:45

Tre Fiori (San Marino)	3–1	(Luxembourg) Fola Esch
Goh 30'; Gjurchinoski 45+1', 51'	Report	B. Correia 37'

San Marino Stadium, Serravalle (Note: Tre Fiori played their home matches at the San Marino Stadium in Serravalle, instead of their regular stadium, the Stadio di Fiorentino, in Fiorentino, which did not meet UEFA requirements.)
Attendance: 360
Referee: Viktor Kopiievskyi (Ukraine)

Tre Fiori won 4–1 on aggregate.

7 July 2022
20:00

Dinamo Minsk (Belarus)	1–1	(Montenegro) Dečić
Kislyak 33'	Report	Denković 26'

DG Arena, Podgorica, Montenegro (Note: Due to the country's involvement in the Russian invasion of Ukraine, Belarusian teams were required to play their home matches at neutral venues and behind closed doors until further notice.)
Attendance: 0
Referee: Jérémie Pignard (France)
14 July 2022
19:45

Dečić (Montenegro)	1–2	(Belarus) Dinamo Minsk
Bećiraj 60'	Report	Sachivko 26'; Bakić 77'

Podgorica City Stadium, Podgorica (Note: Dečić played their home match at the Podgorica City Stadium in Podgorica, instead of their regular stadium, the Stadion Tuško Polje, in Tuzi, which did not meet UEFA requirements.)
Attendance: 2,780
Referee: Dragomir Draganov (Bulgaria)

Dinamo Minsk won 3–2 on aggregate.

7 July 2022
20:45

Tre Penne (San Marino)	0–2	(Bosnia and Herzegovina) Tuzla City
	Report	Nargalić 90+2', 90+3'

San Marino Stadium, Serravalle (Note: Tre Penne played their home match at the San Marino Stadium in Serravalle, instead of their regular stadium, the Stadio Fonte dell'Ovo, in San Marino, which did not meet UEFA requirements.)
Attendance: 442
Referee: Dzmitry Dzmitryieu (Belarus)
14 July 2022
18:00

Tuzla City (Bosnia and Herzegovina)	6–0	(San Marino) Tre Penne
Smajlagić 35' (pen.), 57'; Čeliković 49'; Kuzmanović 50'; Šukilović 58'; Buric 83'	Report

Stadion Grbavica, Sarajevo (Note: Tuzla City played their home matches at the Stadion Grbavica in Sarajevo, instead of their regular stadium, the Tušanj City Stadium, in Tuzla, which did not meet UEFA requirements.)
Attendance: 1,500
Referee: Yigal Frid (Israel)

Tuzla City won 8–0 on aggregate.

7 July 2022
18:00 (20:00 UTC+4)

Saburtalo Tbilisi (Georgia (country))	0–1	(Albania) Partizani
	Report	Cara 47'

Tengiz Burjanadze Stadium, Gori (Note: Saburtalo Tbilisi played their home matches at the Tengiz Burjanadze Stadium in Gori and the Boris Paichadze Dinamo Arena in Tbilisi, instead of their regular stadium, the Mikheil Meskhi Stadium, in Tbilisi.)
Attendance: 2,000
Referee: Mohammad Al-Emara (Finland)
14 July 2022
20:00

Partizani (Albania)	0–1 (a.e.t.)	(Georgia (country)) Saburtalo Tbilisi
	Report	Sikharulidze 53'
Penalties
Atanaskoski (penalty missed); Bitri (penalty scored); Telushi (penalty scored); Skuka (penalty scored); Rrapaj (penalty missed); Sota (penalty scored); Gueye (penalty missed)	4–5	(penalty missed) Jinjolava; (penalty scored) Chaduneli; (penalty scored) Guliashvili; (penalty missed) Nonikashvili; (penalty scored) Sikharulidze; (penalty scored) Gocholeishvili; (penalty scored) G. Mamageishvili

Arena Kombëtare, Tirana
Attendance: 4,178
Referee: Darren England (England)

1–1 on aggregate; Saburtalo Tbilisi won 5–4 on penalties.

7 July 2022
20:00

Shkëndija (North Macedonia)	2–0	(Armenia) Ararat Yerevan
Shala 21'; Nafiu 45'	Report

Toše Proeski Arena, Skopje (Note: Shkëndija played their home matches at the Toše Proeski Arena in Skopje, instead of their regular stadium, the Ecolog Arena, in Tetovo, which did not meet UEFA requirements.)
Attendance: 1,523
Referee: Lukas Fähndrich (Switzerland)
14 July 2022
17:00 (19:00 UTC+4)

Ararat Yerevan (Armenia)	2–2	(North Macedonia) Shkëndija
G. Malakyan 49', 79'	Report	Bravo 2' (o.g.); Guri 45+3'

Vazgen Sargsyan Republican Stadium, Yerevan
Attendance: 2,850
Referee: Oleksii Derevinskyi (Ukraine)

Shkëndija won 4–2 on aggregate.

7 July 2022
19:00

Floriana (Malta)	0–0	(Moldova) Petrocub Hîncești
	Report

Centenary Stadium, Ta' Qali
Attendance: 652
Referee: Pavel Orel (Czech Republic)
14 July 2022
19:00 (20:00 UTC+3)

Petrocub Hîncești (Moldova)	1–0	(Malta) Floriana
Țurcan 26'	Report

Zimbru Stadium, Chișinău (Note: Petrocub Hîncești played their home matches at the Zimbru Stadium in Chișinău, instead of their regular stadium, the Stadionul Municipal, in Hîncești, which did not meet UEFA requirements.)
Attendance: 3,014
Referee: Artyom Kuchin (Kazakhstan)

Petrocub Hîncești won 1–0 on aggregate.

7 July 2022
18:00

Pogoń Szczecin (Poland)	4–1	(Iceland) KR
Drygas 7', 56'; Zahović 16'; Bartkowski 40'	Report	Lárusson 71'

Stadion Miejski im. Floriana Krygiera, Szczecin
Attendance: 9,249
Referee: Eldorjan Hamiti (Albania)
14 July 2022
20:15 (19:15 UTC+0)

KR (Iceland)	1–0	(Poland) Pogoń Szczecin
Hallsson 44'	Report

KR-völlur, Reykjavík
Attendance: 1,050
Referee: Andrew Davey (Northern Ireland)

Pogoń Szczecin won 4–2 on aggregate.

7 July 2022
20:00 (19:00 UTC+1)

HB (Faroe Islands)	1–0	(Wales) Newtown
Wardum 66'	Report

Gundadalur, Tórshavn
Attendance: 500
Referee: Robertas Valikonis (Lithuania)
14 July 2022
19:15 (18:15 UTC+1)

Newtown (Wales)	2–1 (a.e.t.)	(Faroe Islands) HB
Cowans 35'; Mwandwe 45+1'	Report	Petersen 48'
Penalties
M. Jones (penalty missed); Rushton (penalty scored); Ismail (penalty scored); Cowans (penalty scored); Mwandwe (penalty scored)	4–2	(penalty missed) Dalbúð; (penalty scored) Jónsson; (penalty missed) Johansen; (penalty scored) Samuelsen

Park Hall, Oswestry, England (Note: Newtown played their home matches at Park Hall, Oswestry, England, instead of their regular stadium, the Latham Park, in Newtown, which did not meet UEFA requirements.)
Attendance: 794
Referee: Walter Altmann (Austria)

2–2 on aggregate; Newtown won 4–2 on penalties.

7 July 2022
18:00

FCB Magpies (Gibraltar)	2–1	(Northern Ireland) Crusaders
Bent 44'; Pibe 48'	Report	Forsythe 63'

Victoria Stadium, Gibraltar
Attendance: 554
Referee: Helgi Mikael Jónasson (Iceland)
14 July 2022
21:00 (20:00 UTC+1)

Crusaders (Northern Ireland)	3–1	(Gibraltar) FCB Magpies
Heatley 33'; Winchester 80'; Burns 90+3'	Report	Casciaro 37'

Seaview, Belfast
Attendance: 1,745
Referee: Kaarlo Oskari Hämäläinen (Finland)

Crusaders won 4–3 on aggregate.

7 July 2022
18:00 (19:00 UTC+3)

Flora (Estonia)	1–0	(Finland) SJK
Miller 21'	Report

Lilleküla Stadium, Tallinn
Attendance: 1,910
Referee: Lazar Lukić (Serbia)
14 July 2022
18:00 (19:00 UTC+3)

SJK (Finland)	4–2 (a.e.t.)	(Estonia) Flora
Jervis 59' (pen.), 66', 85'; Tikkanen 113'	Report	Lilander 9'; Ojamaa 47'

OmaSP Stadion, Seinäjoki
Attendance: 2,469
Referee: Jørgen Burchardt (Denmark)

SJK won 4–3 on aggregate.

7 July 2022
20:45 (19:45 UTC+1)

Derry City (Republic of Ireland)	0–2	(Latvia) Riga
	Report	Ramos 41'; Filippov 68'

Ryan McBride Brandywell Stadium, Derry
Attendance: 2,999
Referee: Vilhjálmur Alvar Þórarinsson (Iceland)
14 July 2022
19:00 (20:00 UTC+3)

Riga (Latvia)	2–0	(Republic of Ireland) Derry City
Ramos 33', 76'	Report

Skonto Stadium, Riga
Attendance: 3,450
Referee: Jan Machálek (Czech Republic)

Riga won 4–0 on aggregate.

== Second qualifying round ==
=== Summary ===
The first legs were played on 19, 20 and 21 July, and the second legs were played on 26, 27 and 28 July 2022.

The winners of the ties advanced to the third qualifying round of their respective path. The losers were eliminated from European competitions for the season.

Team 1	Agg.	Team 2	1st leg	2nd leg
Champions Path
Shakhtyor Soligorsk (Belarus)	Bye	N/A	—	—
RFS (Latvia)	Bye	N/A	—	—
La Fiorita (San Marino)	0–10	(Kosovo) Ballkani	0–4	0–6
Víkingur Reykjavík (Iceland)	2–0	(Wales) The New Saints	2–0	0–0
Sutjeska (Montenegro)	0–1	(Faroe Islands) KÍ	0–0	0–1
Hibernians (Malta)	4–3	(Estonia) FCI Levadia	3–2	1–1
Tirana (Albania)	2–4	(Bosnia and Herzegovina) Zrinjski Mostar	0–1	2–3
Lech Poznań (Poland)	6–1	(Georgia (country)) Dinamo Batumi	5–0	1–1
CFR Cluj (Romania)	4–1	(Andorra) Inter Club d'Escaldes	3–0	1–1
Tobol (Kazakhstan)	3–0	(Gibraltar) Lincoln Red Imps	2–0	1–0
Main Path
Gżira United (Malta)	5–5 (3–1 p)	(Serbia) Radnički Niš	2–2	3–3 (a.e.t.)
Aris (Greece)	7–2 (Note: Order of legs reversed after original draw.)	(Belarus) Gomel	5–1	2–1
Botev Plovdiv (Bulgaria)	0–2	(Cyprus) APOEL	0–0	0–2
MOL Fehérvár (Hungary)	5–3	(Azerbaijan) Gabala	4–1	1–2
İstanbul Başakşehir (Turkey)	2–1	(Israel) Maccabi Netanya	1–1	1–0
Aris Limassol (Cyprus)	2–3	(Azerbaijan) Neftçi	2–0	0–3
Velež Mostar (Bosnia and Herzegovina)	0–2	(Malta) Hamrun Spartans	0–1	0–1
Saburtalo Tbilisi (Georgia (country))	3–4	(Romania) FCSB	1–0	2–4
Makedonija GP (North Macedonia)	0–4	(Bulgaria) CSKA Sofia	0–0	0–4
Hapoel Be'er Sheva (Israel)	3–1	(Belarus) Dinamo Minsk	2–1	1–0
Zira (Azerbaijan)	0–3	(Israel) Maccabi Tel Aviv	0–3	0–0
Vllaznia (Albania)	1–4	(Romania) Universitatea Craiova	1–1	0–3
Ararat-Armenia	0–0 (3–5 p)	(Estonia) Paide Linnameeskond	0–0	0–0 (a.e.t.)
Kairat (Kazakhstan)	0–2	(Hungary) Kisvárda	0–1	0–1
BATE Borisov (Belarus)	0–5	(Turkey) Konyaspor	0–3	0–2
Sepsi OSK (Romania)	3–3 (4–2 p)	(Slovenia) Olimpija Ljubljana	3–1	0–2 (a.e.t.)
Kyzylzhar (Kazakhstan)	3–2	(Croatia) Osijek	1–2	2–0
Liepāja (Latvia)	0–4	(Switzerland) Young Boys	0–1	0–3
Rapid Wien (Austria)	2–1	(Poland) Lechia Gdańsk	0–0	2–1
SJK (Finland)	2–6	(Norway) Lillestrøm	0–1	2–5
Breiðablik (Iceland)	3–2	(Montenegro) Budućnost Podgorica	2–0	1–2
St Patrick's Athletic (Republic of Ireland)	1–1 (6–5 p)	(Slovenia) Mura	1–1	0–0 (a.e.t.)
St Joseph's (Gibraltar)	0–11	(Czech Republic) Slavia Prague	0–4	0–7
Spartak Trnava (Slovakia)	6–2	(Wales) Newtown	4–1	2–1
Sūduva (Lithuania)	0–2	(Denmark) Viborg	0–1	0–1
Víkingur Gøta (Faroe Islands)	0–4	(Slovakia) DAC Dunajská Streda	0–2	0–2
Pogoń Szczecin (Poland)	1–5	(Denmark) Brøndby	1–1	0–4
AZ (Netherlands)	5–0	(Bosnia and Herzegovina) Tuzla City	1–0	4–0
Motherwell (Scotland)	0–3	(Republic of Ireland) Sligo Rovers	0–1	0–2
Molde (Norway)	6–2	(Sweden) IF Elfsborg	4–1	2–1
Koper (Slovenia)	1–2	(Liechtenstein) Vaduz	0–1	1–1 (a.e.t.)
B36 (Faroe Islands)	1–0	(San Marino) Tre Fiori	1–0	0–0
Ružomberok (Slovakia)	1–5	(Latvia) Riga	0–3	1–2
Basel (Switzerland)	3–1	(Northern Ireland) Crusaders	2–0	1–1
Antwerp (Belgium)	2–0	(Kosovo) Drita	0–0	2–0
Petrocub Hîncești (Moldova)	4–1	(Albania) Laçi	0–0	4–1
Racing Union (Luxembourg)	1–8	(Serbia) Čukarički	1–4	0–4
Levski Sofia (Bulgaria)	3–1	(Greece) PAOK	2–0	1–1
Vitória de Guimarães (Portugal)	3–0	(Hungary) Puskás Akadémia	3–0	0–0
Rijeka (Croatia)	1–4	(Sweden) Djurgårdens IF	1–2	0–2
Vorskla Poltava (Ukraine)	3–4	(Sweden) AIK	3–2	0–2 (a.e.t.)
Valmiera (Latvia)	2–5	(North Macedonia) Shkëndija	1–2	1–3
Raków Częstochowa (Poland)	6–0	(Kazakhstan) Astana	5–0	1–0
KuPS (Finland)	6–3	(Moldova) Milsami Orhei	2–2	4–1
Sparta Prague (Czech Republic)	1–2	(Norway) Viking	0–0	1–2

=== Champions Path matches ===
19 July 2022
20:45

La Fiorita (San Marino)	0–4	(Kosovo) Ballkani
	Report	Korenica 6'; Rrahmani 23', 50'; Berisha 73'

San Marino Stadium, Serravalle
Attendance: 271
Referee: Nikola Popov (Bulgaria)
26 July 2022
20:00

Ballkani (Kosovo)	6–0	(San Marino) La Fiorita
Rrahmani 6', 8', 69'; Abazi 73', 90+1'; Krasniqi 75'	Report

Fadil Vokrri Stadium, Pristina (Note: Ballkani played their home matches at the Fadil Vokrri Stadium in Pristina, instead of their regular stadium, the Theranda City Stadium, Suva Reka, which did not meet UEFA requirements.)
Attendance: 2,000
Referee: Adam Ladebäck (Sweden)

Ballkani won 10–0 on aggregate.

21 July 2022
21:30 (19:30 UTC+0)

Víkingur Reykjavík (Iceland)	2–0	(Wales) The New Saints
K. Ingason 29' (pen.), 57' (pen.)	Report

Víkingsvöllur, Reykjavík
Attendance: 812
Referee: Peter Kráľovič (Slovakia)
26 July 2022
19:15 (18:15 UTC+1)

The New Saints (Wales)	0–0	(Iceland) Víkingur Reykjavík
	Report

Park Hall, Oswestry
Attendance: 537
Referee: Ivaylo Stoyanov (Bulgaria)

Víkingur Reykjavík won 2–0 on aggregate.

20 July 2022
21:00

Sutjeska (Montenegro)	0–0	(Faroe Islands) KÍ
	Report

DG Arena, Podgorica (Note: Sutjeska Nikšić played their home match at the DG Arena in Podgorica, instead of their regular stadium, the Gradski stadion, in Nikšić, which did not meet UEFA requirements.)
Attendance: 920
Referee: Arda Kardeşler (Turkey)
27 July 2022
20:00 (19:00 UTC+1)

KÍ (Faroe Islands)	1–0	(Montenegro) Sutjeska
Klettskarð 66'	Report

Við Djúpumýrar, Klaksvík
Attendance: 920
Referee: Christian-Petru Ciochirca (Austria)

KÍ won 1–0 on aggregate.

19 July 2022
20:00

Hibernians (Malta)	3–2	(Estonia) FCI Levadia
Apap 17'; Degabriele 24'; Muritala 90'	Report	Uggè 87'; Agyiri 90+4'

Centenary Stadium, Ta' Qali (Note: Hibernians played their home matches at the Centenary Stadium in Ta' Qali, instead of their regular stadium, the Hibernians Stadium, in Paola, which did not meet UEFA requirements.)
Attendance: 474
Referee: Volen Chinkov (Bulgaria)
28 July 2022
19:00 (20:00 UTC+3)

FCI Levadia (Estonia)	1–1	(Malta) Hibernians
Õigus 79'	Report	Apap 78'

Lilleküla Stadium, Tallinn
Attendance: 1,351
Referee: Henrik Nalbandyan (Armenia)

Hibernians won 4–3 on aggregate.

19 July 2022
20:00

Tirana (Albania)	0–1	(Bosnia and Herzegovina) Zrinjski Mostar
	Report	Bilbija 12' (pen.)

Arena Kombëtare, Tirana (Note: Tirana played their home match at the Arena Kombëtare, instead of their regular stadium, the Selman Stërmasi Stadium, which did not meet UEFA requirements.)
Attendance: 4,136
Referee: Loukas Sotiriou (Cyprus)
28 July 2022
21:00

Zrinjski Mostar (Bosnia and Herzegovina)	3–2	(Albania) Tirana
Janković 25'; Tičinović 36'; Ćuže 80'	Report	Ismailgeci 51'; Xhixha 83'

Stadion pod Bijelim Brijegom, Mostar
Attendance: 5,000
Referee: Yasar Kemal Ugurlu (Turkey)

Zrinjski Mostar won 4–2 on aggregate.

21 July 2022
18:00

Lech Poznań (Poland)	5–0	(Georgia (country)) Dinamo Batumi
Skóraś 10', 33'; Amaral 24', 66'; Ishak 90+4'	Report

Stadion Poznań, Poznań
Attendance: 9,111
Referee: Ian McNabb (Northern Ireland)
28 July 2022
19:00 (21:00 UTC+4)

Dinamo Batumi (Georgia (country))	1–1	(Poland) Lech Poznań
Vatsadze 64'	Report	Czerwiński 76'

Batumi Stadium, Batumi
Attendance: 19,343
Referee: Igor Stojchevski (North Macedonia)

Lech Poznań won 6–1 on aggregate.

21 July 2022
19:30 (20:30 UTC+3)

CFR Cluj (Romania)	3–0	(Andorra) Inter Club d'Escaldes
Betancor 5' (pen.); Debeljuh 38'; Feher 84' (o.g.)	Report

Stadionul Dr. Constantin Rădulescu, Cluj
Attendance: 4,421
Referee: Alex Troleis (Faroe Islands)
27 July 2022
19:00

Inter Club d'Escaldes (Andorra)	1–1	(Romania) CFR Cluj
Soldevila 21'	Report	Deac 51' (pen.)

Estadi Comunal, Andorra la Vella
Attendance: 242
Referee: Kristoffer Hagenes (Norway)

CFR Cluj won 4–1 on aggregate.

21 July 2022
16:00 (20:00 UTC+6)

Tobol (Kazakhstan)	2–0	(Gibraltar) Lincoln Red Imps
Zhaksylykov 65'; Tomašević 90+1'	Report

Central Stadium, Kostanay
Attendance: 6,000
Referee: Matthew De Gabriele (Malta)
26 July 2022
18:00

Lincoln Red Imps (Gibraltar)	0–1	(Kazakhstan) Tobol
	Report	Tošić 31'

Victoria Stadium, Gibraltar
Attendance: 742
Referee: Gal Leibovitz (Israel)

Tobol won 3–0 on aggregate.

=== Main Path matches ===
21 July 2022
19:00

Gżira United (Malta)	2–2	(Serbia) Radnički Niš
Maxuell 56', 61' (pen.)	Report	Štulić 28'; Gakou 90+2'

Centenary Stadium, Ta' Qali
Attendance: 572
Referee: Ferenc Karakó (Hungary)
28 July 2022
19:00

Radnički Niš (Serbia)	3–3 (a.e.t.)	(Malta) Gżira United
Tolordava 15'; Petrov 77'; Pejović 102' (pen.)	Report	Jefferson 15', 90+4'; Maxuell 117'
Penalties
Pejović (penalty missed); Mesarović (penalty scored); Michibuchi (penalty missed); Petrov (penalty missed)	1–3	(penalty scored) Maxuell; (penalty scored) Mendonza; (penalty scored) Pisani

Čair Stadium, Niš
Attendance: 3,929
Referee: Andrei Chivulete (Romania)

5–5 on aggregate; Gżira United won 3–1 on penalties.

21 July 2022
20:00 (21:00 UTC+3)

Aris (Greece)	5–1	(Belarus) Gomel
Gray 16' (pen.), 79'; Iturbe 28'; Camacho 31'; Palma 61'	Report	Fabiano 11' (o.g.)

Kleanthis Vikelidis Stadium, Thessaloniki
Attendance: 12,000
Referee: Walter Altmann (Austria)
27 July 2022
20:00 (21:00 UTC+3)

Gomel (Belarus)	1–2	(Greece) Aris
Gogolashvili 82' (pen.)	Report	Gray 45', 90+3'

Kleanthis Vikelidis Stadium, Thessaloniki, Greece
Attendance: 0
Referee: Nicolas Laforge (Belgium)

Aris won 7–2 on aggregate.

20 July 2022
19:00 (20:00 UTC+3)

Botev Plovdiv (Bulgaria)	0–0	(Cyprus) APOEL
	Report

Vasil Levski National Stadium, Sofia (Note: Botev Plovdiv played their home match at the Vasil Levski National Stadium in Sofia, instead of their regular venue Stadion Hristo Botev, in Plovdiv, due to reconstruction.)
Attendance: 4,120
Referee: Balázs Berke (Hungary)
28 July 2022
19:00 (20:00 UTC+3)

APOEL (Cyprus)	2–0	(Bulgaria) Botev Plovdiv
Chebake 45+1'; Efrem 90+3'	Report

GSP Stadium, Nicosia
Attendance: 12,034
Referee: Morten Krogh (Denmark)

APOEL won 2–0 on aggregate.

21 July 2022
19:00

MOL Fehérvár (Hungary)	4–1	(Azerbaijan) Gabala
Kodro 30', 74'; Rus 67'; Zivzivadze 90'	Report	Utzig 16'

MOL Aréna Sóstó, Székesfehérvár
Attendance: 4,750
Referee: Kaspar Sjöberg (Sweden)
28 July 2022
18:00 (20:00 UTC+4)

Gabala (Azerbaijan)	2–1	(Hungary) MOL Fehérvár
Muradov 34'; Santos 73'	Report	Zivzivadze 44'

Gabala City Stadium, Qabala
Attendance: 1,800
Referee: Christopher Jäger (Austria)

MOL Fehérvár won 5–3 on aggregate.

21 July 2022
19:45 (20:45 UTC+3)

İstanbul Başakşehir (Turkey)	1–1	(Israel) Maccabi Netanya
Szysz 81'	Report	Itzhak 2'

Başakşehir Fatih Terim Stadium, Istanbul
Attendance: 2,776
Referee: Irakli Kvirikashvili (Georgia)
28 July 2022
18:45 (19:45 UTC+3)

Maccabi Netanya (Israel)	0–1	(Turkey) İstanbul Başakşehir
	Report	Ndayishimiye 9'

Netanya Stadium, Netanya
Attendance: 11,400
Referee: Dario Bel (Croatia)

İstanbul Başakşehir won 2–1 on aggregate.

21 July 2022
19:30 (20:30 UTC+3)

Aris Limassol (Cyprus)	2–0	(Azerbaijan) Neftçi
Caju 53'; Gomis 66'	Report

AEK Arena – Georgios Karapatakis, Larnaca (Note: Aris Limassol played their home match at the AEK Arena – Georgios Karapatakis in Larnaca, instead of their regular venue Tsirio Stadium, in Limassol, which did not meet UEFA requirements)
Attendance: 1,371
Referee: Ivan Bebek (Croatia)
28 July 2022
19:00 (21:00 UTC+4)

Neftçi (Azerbaijan)	3–0	(Cyprus) Aris Limassol
Donyoh 38'; Eddy 57'; Saief 62'	Report

Bakcell Arena, Baku
Attendance: 9,500
Referee: Bastian Dankert (Germany)

Neftçi won 3–2 on aggregate.

21 July 2022
20:30

Velež Mostar (Bosnia and Herzegovina)	0–1	(Malta) Hamrun Spartans
	Report	Guillaumier 30'

Stadion Grbavica, Sarajevo (Note: Velež Mostar played their home match at the Stadion Grbavica in Sarajevo, instead of their regular venue Stadion Rođeni, Mostar.)
Attendance: 7,186
Referee: Andrew Davey (Northern Ireland)
28 July 2022
20:00

Hamrun Spartans (Malta)	1–0	(Bosnia and Herzegovina) Velež Mostar
Jonny 15'	Report

Centenary Stadium, Ta' Qali
Attendance: 1,695
Referee: Juri Frischer (Estonia)

Hamrun Spartans won 2–0 on aggregate.

21 July 2022
18:00 (20:00 UTC+4)

Saburtalo Tbilisi (Georgia (country))	1–0	(Romania) FCSB
Nonikashvili 41'	Report

Boris Paichadze Dinamo Arena, Tbilisi
Attendance: 4,500
Referee: Kai Erik Steen (Norway)
28 July 2022
19:30 (20:30 UTC+3)

FCSB (Romania)	4–2	(Georgia (country)) Saburtalo Tbilisi
Dawa 44'; Edjouma 55'; Coman 80'; Radunović 87' (pen.)	Report	Sikharulidze 69'; Tabatadze 78'

Arena Națională, Bucharest
Attendance: 25,228
Referee: Jonathan Lardot (Belgium)

FCSB won 4–3 on aggregate.

21 July 2022
17:00

Makedonija GP (North Macedonia)	0–0	(Bulgaria) CSKA Sofia
	Report

Petar Miloševski Training Centre, Skopje (Note: Makedonija Gjorče Petrov played their home match at the Petar Miloševski Training Centre, instead of their regular stadium, the Ǵorče Petrov Stadium, which did not meet UEFA requirements.)
Attendance: 402
Referee: Bram Van Driessche (Belgium)
28 July 2022
19:00 (20:00 UTC+3)

CSKA Sofia (Bulgaria)	4–0	(North Macedonia) Makedonija GP
Mattheij 31'; Yomov 61'; Tufegdžić 78'; Nazon 87'	Report

Stadion Balgarska Armia, Sofia
Attendance: 4,697
Referee: Marcel Birsan (Romania)

CSKA Sofia won 4–0 on aggregate.

21 July 2022
19:30 (20:30 UTC+3)

Hapoel Be'er Sheva (Israel)	2–1	(Belarus) Dinamo Minsk
Yehezkel 1'; Hatuel 52'	Report	Kontsevoy 76'

Turner Stadium, Be'er Sheva
Attendance: 14,571
Referee: Espen Eskås (Norway)
28 July 2022
20:00 (21:00 UTC+3)

Dinamo Minsk (Belarus)	0–1	(Israel) Hapoel Be'er Sheva
	Report	Hatuel 85'

Turner Stadium, Be'er Sheva, Israel
Attendance: 0
Referee: Marian Alexandru Barbu (Romania)

Hapoel Be'er Sheva won 3–1 on aggregate.

21 July 2022
18:00 (20:00 UTC+4)

Zira (Azerbaijan)	0–3	(Israel) Maccabi Tel Aviv
	Report	Kanichowsky 18'; Jovanović 22', 54'

Dalga Arena, Baku (Note: Zira played their home match at the Dalga Arena, instead of their regular stadium, the Zira Olympic Sport Complex Stadium, which did not meet UEFA requirements.)
Attendance: 4,400
Referee: Rob Hennessy (Republic of Ireland)
28 July 2022
19:30 (20:30 UTC+3)

Maccabi Tel Aviv (Israel)	0–0	(Azerbaijan) Zira
	Report

Bloomfield Stadium, Tel Aviv
Attendance: 11,703
Referee: Mario Zebec (Croatia)

Maccabi Tel Aviv won 3–0 on aggregate.

21 July 2022
21:00

Vllaznia (Albania)	1–1	(Romania) Universitatea Craiova
Hoxhaj 51'	Report	Ivan 45+2' (pen.)

Loro Boriçi Stadium, Shkodër
Attendance: 8,958
Referee: Paul McLaughlin (Republic of Ireland)
28 July 2022
19:30 (20:30 UTC+3)

Universitatea Craiova (Romania)	3–0	(Albania) Vllaznia
Mateiu 58'; Raul Silva 62'; Găman 80'	Report

Stadionul Ion Oblemenco, Craiova
Attendance: 12,324
Referee: Ondřej Berka (Czech Republic)

Universitatea Craiova won 4–1 on aggregate.

21 July 2022
17:00 (19:00 UTC+4)

Ararat-Armenia	0–0	(Estonia) Paide Linnameeskond
	Report

Yerevan Football Academy Stadium, Yerevan
Attendance: 1,400
Referee: Sandi Putros (Denmark)
28 July 2022
18:00 (19:00 UTC+3)

Paide Linnameeskond (Estonia)	0–0 (a.e.t.)	Ararat-Armenia
	Report
Penalties
Mošnikov (penalty scored); Palumets (penalty scored); Singhateh (penalty scored); Saarma (penalty scored); Tambedou (penalty scored)	5–3	(penalty scored) Alemão; (penalty scored) Lima; (penalty scored) Wbeymar; (penalty missed) Duarte

Pärnu Rannastaadion, Pärnu
Attendance: 1,427
Referee: Damian Sylwestrzak (Poland)

0–0 on aggregate; Paide Linnameeskond won 5–3 on penalties.

21 July 2022
16:00 (20:00 UTC+6)

Kairat (Kazakhstan)	0–1	(Hungary) Kisvárda
	Report	Asani 82'

Almaty Central Stadium, Almaty
Attendance: 17,182
Referee: Peter Kjærsgaard-Andersen (Denmark)
28 July 2022
18:00

Kisvárda (Hungary)	1–0	(Kazakhstan) Kairat
Mešanović 39'	Report

Várkerti Stadion, Kisvárda
Attendance: 2,560
Referee: Chrysovalantis Theouli (Cyprus)

Kisvárda won 2–0 on aggregate.

21 July 2022
21:00 (22:00 UTC+3)

BATE Borisov (Belarus)	0–3	(Turkey) Konyaspor
	Report	Bytyqi 39'; Michalak 58'; Murić 90+5'

Konya Metropolitan Municipality Stadium, Konya, Turkey
Attendance: 0
Referee: Gustavo Correia (Portugal)
28 July 2022
20:00 (21:00 UTC+3)

Konyaspor (Turkey)	2–0	(Belarus) BATE Borisov
Rahmanović 37'; Calvo 43'	Report

Konya Metropolitan Municipality Stadium, Konya
Attendance: 22,795
Referee: Novak Simović (Serbia)

Konyaspor won 5–0 on aggregate.

21 July 2022
20:00 (21:00 UTC+3)

Sepsi OSK (Romania)	3–1	(Slovenia) Olimpija Ljubljana
Ștefănescu 45+4'; Păun 84'; Karamatic 90+3' (o.g.)	Report	Sešlar 4'

Stadionul Sepsi Arena, Sfântu Gheorghe
Attendance: 7,600
Referee: Don Robertson (Scotland)
28 July 2022
19:00

Olimpija Ljubljana (Slovenia)	2–0 (a.e.t.)	(Romania) Sepsi OSK
Kvesić 61'; Krefl 70'	Report
Penalties
Nukić (penalty missed); Crnomarković (penalty scored); Ziljkić (penalty scored); Prtajin (penalty missed)	2–4	(penalty scored) Mitrea; (penalty scored) Tudorie; (penalty scored) Damașcan; (penalty scored) Gheorghe

Stožice Stadium, Ljubljana
Attendance: 1,500
Referee: Sebastian Gishamer (Austria)

3–3 on aggregate; Sepsi OSK won 4–2 on penalties.

21 July 2022
14:00 (18:00 UTC+6)

Kyzylzhar (Kazakhstan)	1–2	(Croatia) Osijek
Nejašmić 84' (o.g.)	Report	Topčagić 58'; Kleinheisler 76'

Astana Arena, Nur-Sultan (Note: Kyzylzhar played their home matches at the Astana Arena in Nur-Sultan, instead of their regular venue Karasai Stadium, Petropavl, which did not meet UEFA requirements.)
Attendance: 1,458
Referee: Aleksandrs Anufrijevs (Latvia)
28 July 2022
20:30

Osijek (Croatia)	0–2	(Kazakhstan) Kyzylzhar
	Report	Ivaniadze 62'; Koné 71'

Gradski Vrt Stadium, Osijek
Attendance: 5,107
Referee: Anastasios Papapetrou (Greece)

Kyzylzhar won 3–2 on aggregate.

21 July 2022
16:00 (17:00 UTC+3)

Liepāja (Latvia)	0–1	(Switzerland) Young Boys
	Report	Fassnacht 73'

Daugava Stadium, Liepāja
Attendance: 3,734
Referee: David Munro (Scotland)
28 July 2022
20:00

Young Boys (Switzerland)	3–0	(Latvia) Liepāja
Nsame 2' (pen.); Rrudhani 41'; Niasse 72'	Report

Stadion Wankdorf, Bern
Attendance: 14,112
Referee: Abdulkadir Bitigen (Turkey)

Young Boys won 4–0 on aggregate.

21 July 2022
19:00

Rapid Wien (Austria)	0–0	(Poland) Lechia Gdańsk
	Report

Allianz Stadion, Vienna
Attendance: 12,700
Referee: Elchin Masiyev (Azerbaijan)
28 July 2022
19:45

Lechia Gdańsk (Poland)	1–2	(Austria) Rapid Wien
Zwoliński 82'	Report	Kühn 16'; Grüll 18' (pen.)

Stadion Gdańsk, Gdańsk
Attendance: 23,519
Referee: Alessandro Dudic (Switzerland)

Rapid Wien won 2–1 on aggregate.

21 July 2022
18:00 (19:00 UTC+3)

SJK (Finland)	0–1	(Norway) Lillestrøm
	Report	Dragsnes 68'

OmaSP Stadion, Seinäjoki
Attendance: 3,613
Referee: Marcel Birsan (Romania)
28 July 2022
19:00

Lillestrøm (Norway)	5–2	(Finland) SJK
Mathew 23'; Friðjónsson 42', 56', 61'; Rösler 85'	Report	Laine 31'; Rojas 90+1'

Åråsen Stadion, Lillestrøm
Attendance: 3,829
Referee: Iwan Arwel Griffith (Wales)

Lillestrøm won 6–2 on aggregate.

21 July 2022
21:15 (19:15 UTC+0)

Breiðablik (Iceland)	2–0	(Montenegro) Budućnost Podgorica
Steindórsson 88'; Gunnlaugsson 90+5' (pen.)	Report

Kópavogsvöllur, Kópavogur
Attendance: 968
Referee: Denys Shurman (Ukraine)
28 July 2022
20:30

Budućnost Podgorica (Montenegro)	2–1	(Iceland) Breiðablik
Janković 38'; Vl. Adžic 86'	Report	Þorvaldsson 51'

Podgorica City Stadium, Podgorica
Attendance: 5,212
Referee: Tom Owen (Wales)

Breiðablik won 3–2 on aggregate.

21 July 2022
20:45

St Patrick's Athletic (Republic of Ireland)	1–1	(Slovenia) Mura
Forrester 60'	Report	Daku 28'

Richmond Park, Dublin
Attendance: 2,560
Referee: Ishmael Barbara (Malta)
28 July 2022
20:00

Mura (Slovenia)	0–0 (a.e.t.)	(Republic of Ireland) St Patrick's Athletic
	Report
Penalties
Bobičanec (penalty scored); Majić (penalty missed); Daku (penalty scored); Klepač (penalty missed); Šroler (penalty scored); Beganović (penalty scored); Obradović (penalty scored); T. Cipot (penalty missed)	5–6	(penalty scored) E. Doyle; (penalty scored) Coughlan; (penalty missed) Cotter; (penalty scored) McClelland; (penalty missed) Grivosti; (penalty scored) Timmermans; (penalty scored) Atakayi; (penalty scored) Redmond

Fazanerija City Stadium, Murska Sobota
Attendance: 3,800
Referee: Urs Schnyder (Switzerland)

1–1 on aggregate; St Patrick's Athletic won 6–5 on penalties.

21 July 2022
19:00

St Joseph's (Gibraltar)	0–4	(Czech Republic) Slavia Prague
	Report	Sor 21', 32'; Ewerton 45+1'; Lingr 56'

Victoria Stadium, Gibraltar
Attendance: 756
Referee: Ívar Orri Kristjánsson (Iceland)
28 July 2022
19:00

Slavia Prague (Czech Republic)	7–0	(Gibraltar) St Joseph's
Olayinka 18', 29'; Jurečka 20'; Fila 34'; Tiéhi 49'; Ewerton 90+3'; Traoré 90+4'	Report

Sinobo Stadium, Prague
Attendance: 15,359
Referee: Tomasz Musiał (Poland)

Slavia Prague won 11–0 on aggregate.

21 July 2022
20:30

Spartak Trnava (Slovakia)	4–1	(Wales) Newtown
Yusuf 17', 41', 44'; Iván 75'	Report	Cowans 23'

Štadión Antona Malatinského, Trnava
Attendance: 5,247
Referee: Luka Bilbija (Bosnia and Herzegovina)
28 July 2022
19:15

Newtown (Wales)	1–2	(Slovakia) Spartak Trnava
A. Williams 35' (pen.)	Report	Štefánik 73'; Bukata 79'

Park Hall, Oswestry, England
Attendance: 654
Referee: Aristotelis Diamantopoulos (Greece)

Spartak Trnava won 6–2 on aggregate.

21 July 2022
18:30 (19:30 UTC+3)

Sūduva (Lithuania)	0–1	(Denmark) Viborg
	Report	Berger 78'

Sūduva Stadium, Marijampolė
Attendance: 1,654
Referee: Georgi Davidov (Bulgaria)
28 July 2022
19:00

Viborg (Denmark)	1–0	(Lithuania) Sūduva
Said 1'	Report

Viborg Stadion, Viborg
Attendance: 5,140
Referee: Jamie Robinson (Northern Ireland)

Viborg won 2–0 on aggregate.

20 July 2022
20:00

Víkingur Gøta (Faroe Islands)	0–2	(Slovakia) DAC Dunajská Streda
	Report	Krstović 8'; Cigaņiks 81'

Tórsvøllur, Tórshavn
Attendance: 610
Referee: Nejc Kajtazović (Slovenia)
28 July 2022
20:30

DAC Dunajská Streda (Slovakia)	2–0	(Faroe Islands) Víkingur Gøta
Krstović 26'; Veselovský 34'	Report

MOL Aréna, Dunajská Streda
Attendance: 5,076
Referee: Juxhin Xhaja (Albania)

DAC Dunajská Streda won 4–0 on aggregate.

21 July 2022
18:30

Pogoń Szczecin (Poland)	1–1	(Denmark) Brøndby
Zahović 85'	Report	Riveros 28'

Stadion Miejski im. Floriana Krygiera, Szczecin
Attendance: 8,753
Referee: Nenad Minaković (Serbia)
28 July 2022
20:00

Brøndby (Denmark)	4–0	(Poland) Pogoń Szczecin
Hedlund 17' (pen.), 33'; Kvistgaarden 52'; Divković 62'	Report

Brøndby Stadium, Brøndbyvester
Attendance: 15,417
Referee: Alexandre Boucaut (Belgium)

Brøndby won 5–1 on aggregate.

21 July 2022
20:30

AZ (Netherlands)	1–0	(Bosnia and Herzegovina) Tuzla City
D. de Wit 12' (pen.)	Report

AFAS Stadion, Alkmaar
Attendance: 9,047
Referee: Lukas Fähndrich (Switzerland)
28 July 2022
20:45

Tuzla City (Bosnia and Herzegovina)	0–4	(Netherlands) AZ
	Report	D. de Wit 34'; Pavlidis 61'; Lahdo 63'; De Jong 81'

Stadion Grbavica, Sarajevo
Attendance: 4,800
Referee: Ashot Ghaltakhchyan (Armenia)

AZ won 5–0 on aggregate.

21 July 2022
20:45

Motherwell (Scotland)	0–1	(Republic of Ireland) Sligo Rovers
	Report	Keena 27'

Fir Park, Motherwell
Attendance: 7,227
Referee: Kári Á Høvdanum (Faroe Islands)
28 July 2022
20:00

Sligo Rovers (Republic of Ireland)	2–0	(Scotland) Motherwell
Blaney 4'; Mata 90+1'	Report

The Showgrounds, Sligo
Attendance: 3,876
Referee: Bojan Pandžić (Sweden)

Sligo Rovers won 3–0 on aggregate.

21 July 2022
18:00

Molde (Norway)	4–1	(Sweden) IF Elfsborg
Kaasa 49'; Haugen 55'; Breivik 60'; Mannsverk 81' (pen.)	Report	Alm 14'

Aker Stadion, Molde
Attendance: 4,771
Referee: Willy Delajod (France)
28 July 2022
18:45

IF Elfsborg (Sweden)	1–2	(Norway) Molde
Baidoo 40'	Report	Breivik 54'; Fofana 83'

Borås Arena, Borås
Attendance: 3,441
Referee: Peter Bankes (England)

Molde won 6–2 on aggregate.

21 July 2022
18:00

Koper (Slovenia)	0–1	(Liechtenstein) Vaduz
	Report	Cicek 53'

Bonifika Stadium, Koper
Attendance: 860
Referee: Gergő Bogár (Hungary)
28 July 2022
20:00

Vaduz (Liechtenstein)	1–1 (a.e.t.)	(Slovenia) Koper
Sasere 101'	Report	Kotnik 88'

Rheinpark Stadion, Vaduz
Attendance: 743
Referee: Besfort Kasumi (Kosovo)

Vaduz won 2–1 on aggregate.

21 July 2022
19:00

B36 (Faroe Islands)	1–0	(San Marino) Tre Fiori
Johansen 84'	Report

Gundadalur, Tórshavn
Attendance: 640
Referee: António Nobre (Portugal)
28 July 2022
20:45

Tre Fiori (San Marino)	0–0	(Faroe Islands) B36
	Report

San Marino Stadium, Serravalle
Attendance: 280
Referee: Daniel Schlager (Germany)

B36 won 1–0 on aggregate.

21 July 2022
18:30

Ružomberok (Slovakia)	0–3	(Latvia) Riga
	Report	Torres 43'; Soisalo 45'; Douglas Aurélio 50'

Štadión pod Čebraťom, Ružomberok
Attendance: 2,757
Referee: Genc Nuza (Kosovo)
28 July 2022
19:00

Riga (Latvia)	2–1	(Slovakia) Ružomberok
Babec 39'; Soisalo 58'	Report	Maslo 53' (pen.)

Skonto Stadium, Riga
Attendance: 5,125
Referee: Jasmin Šabotić (Luxembourg)

Riga won 5–1 on aggregate.

21 July 2022
19:00

Basel (Switzerland)	2–0	(Northern Ireland) Crusaders
Ndoye 38'; Szalai 48'	Report

St. Jakob-Park, Basel
Attendance: 6,058
Referee: Amine Kourgheli (Belarus)
28 July 2022
21:00

Crusaders (Northern Ireland)	1–1	(Switzerland) Basel
Burns 53'	Report	Millar 36'

Seaview, Belfast
Attendance: 2,425
Referee: David Šmajc (Slovenia)

Basel won 3–1 on aggregate.

21 July 2022
19:00

Antwerp (Belgium)	0–0	(Kosovo) Drita
	Report

Bosuilstadion, Antwerp
Attendance: 8,215
Referee: Philip Farrugia (Malta)
28 July 2022
20:00

Drita (Kosovo)	0–2	(Belgium) Antwerp
	Report	Krasniqi 53'; Balikwisha 90+8'

Fadil Vokrri Stadium, Pristina
Attendance: 9,432
Referee: Sander van der Eijk (Netherlands)

Antwerp won 2–0 on aggregate.

21 July 2022
19:00

Petrocub Hîncești (Moldova)	0–0	(Albania) Laçi
	Report

Zimbru Stadium, Chișinău
Attendance: 5,439
Referee: Krzysztof Jakubik (Poland)
28 July 2022
20:00

Laçi (Albania)	1–4	(Moldova) Petrocub Hîncești
Mazrekaj 38'	Report	Cotogoi 54'; Ambros 74', 75'; Cojocaru 90+3'

Elbasan Arena, Elbasan
Attendance: 250
Referee: Manuel Schüttengruber (Austria)

Petrocub Hîncești won 4–1 on aggregate.

21 July 2022
20:00

Racing Union (Luxembourg)	1–4	(Serbia) Čukarički
Omrani 19'	Report	Kovač 16', 51'; Mijailović 35'; Lukić 66'

Stade de Luxembourg, Luxembourg City (Note: Racing Union played their home match at the Stade de Luxembourg, instead of their regular venue Stade Achille Hammerel, which did not meet UEFA requirements.)
Attendance: 832
Referee: Viktor Shimusik (Belarus)
28 July 2022
20:00

Čukarički (Serbia)	4–0	(Luxembourg) Racing Union
Badamosi 39', 41'; Ivanović 52'; Spasojević 73'	Report

Čukarički Stadium, Belgrade
Attendance: 1,105
Referee: Bulat Sariyev (Kazakhstan)

Čukarički won 8–1 on aggregate.

21 July 2022
19:00 (20:00 UTC+3)

Levski Sofia (Bulgaria)	2–0	(Greece) PAOK
Welton Felipe 1'; Bari 19'	Report

Stadion Georgi Asparuhov, Sofia
Attendance: 14,123
Referee: Jérémie Pignard (France)
28 July 2022
19:30 (20:30 UTC+3)

PAOK (Greece)	1–1	(Bulgaria) Levski Sofia
Dantas 56'	Report	Ronaldo 25'

Toumba Stadium, Thessaloniki
Attendance: 15,000
Referee: César Soto Grado (Spain)

Levski Sofia won 3–1 on aggregate.

21 July 2022
21:30 (20:30 UTC+1)

Vitória de Guimarães (Portugal)	3–0	(Hungary) Puskás Akadémia
Lameiras 4'; Tiago Silva 39'; Silva 65'	Report

Estádio D. Afonso Henriques, Guimarães
Attendance: 14,863
Referee: Henrik Nalbandyan (Armenia)
28 July 2022
21:00

Puskás Akadémia (Hungary)	0–0	(Portugal) Vitória de Guimarães
	Report

Pancho Aréna, Felcsút
Attendance: 2,325
Referee: Jakob Alexander Sundberg (Denmark)

Vitória de Guimarães won 3–0 on aggregate.

21 July 2022
20:30

Rijeka (Croatia)	1–2	(Sweden) Djurgårdens IF
Vučkić 13'	Report	Finndell 38'; Edvardsen 54'

Stadion Rujevica, Rijeka
Attendance: 6,473
Referee: Christian-Petru Ciochirca (Austria)
28 July 2022
19:00

Djurgårdens IF (Sweden)	2–0	(Croatia) Rijeka
Hien 55'; Banda 84'	Report

Tele2 Arena, Stockholm
Attendance: 18,605
Referee: Snir Levy (Israel)

Djurgårdens IF won 4–1 on aggregate.

21 July 2022
19:00

Vorskla Poltava (Ukraine)	3–2	(Sweden) AIK
Stepanyuk 4'; Kozyrenko 24'; Chelyadin 69'	Report	Stefanelli 17'; Larsson 44'

Tele2 Arena, Stockholm, Sweden (Note: Due to the Russian invasion of Ukraine, Ukrainian teams are required to play their home matches at neutral venues until further notice.)
Attendance: 7,911
Referee: Urs Schnyder (Switzerland)
27 July 2022
19:00

AIK (Sweden)	2–0 (a.e.t.)	(Ukraine) Vorskla Poltava
Mendes 45+3'; Björnström 107'	Report

Friends Arena, Solna
Attendance: 15,759
Referee: Miloš Milanović (Serbia)

AIK won 4–3 on aggregate.

21 July 2022
17:00

Valmiera (Latvia)	1–2	(North Macedonia) Shkëndija
Guèye 45'	Report	Doriev 9'; Guri 63'

Daugava Stadium, Riga
Attendance: 1,073
Referee: Michal Ocenáš (Slovakia)
28 July 2022
20:00

Shkëndija (North Macedonia)	3–1	(Latvia) Valmiera
Bejtulai 11'; Doriev 33'; Ramadani 85'	Report	Murata 25'

Toše Proeski Arena, Skopje
Attendance: 2,100
Referee: Kevin Clancy (Scotland)

Shkëndija won 5–2 on aggregate.

21 July 2022
21:00

Raków Częstochowa (Poland)	5–0	(Kazakhstan) Astana
Ivi 4'; Wdowiak 42'; Gutkovskis 66'; Kocherhin 77'; Tudor 90+4' (pen.)	Report

Miejski Stadion Piłkarski "Raków", Częstochowa
Attendance: 5,324
Referee: Goga Kikacheishvili (Georgia)
28 July 2022
17:00 (21:00 UTC+6)

Astana (Kazakhstan)	0–1	(Poland) Raków Częstochowa
	Report	Kocherhin 16'

Astana Arena, Nur-Sultan
Attendance: 8,569
Referee: Tomáš Klíma (Czech Republic)

Raków Częstochowa won 6–0 on aggregate.

21 July 2022
18:00

KuPS (Finland)	2–2	(Moldova) Milsami Orhei
Ikaunieks 46'; Väyrynen 84'	Report	Spătaru 60'; Camara 87'

Kuopio Football Stadium, Kuopio
Attendance: 2,403
Referee: Aristotelis Diamantopoulos (Greece)
28 July 2022
18:00

Milsami Orhei (Moldova)	1–4	(Finland) KuPS
Gînsari 45+2'	Report	Bispo 27'; Miettinen 53'; Carrillo 88'; Valenčič 90+1'

District Sport Complex, Orhei
Attendance: 2,800
Referee: Trustin Farrugia Cann (Malta)

KuPS won 6–3 on aggregate.

21 July 2022
19:00

Sparta Prague (Czech Republic)	0–0	(Norway) Viking
	Report

Stadion Letná, Prague
Attendance: 12,667
Referee: Manfredas Lukjančukas (Lithuania)
28 July 2022
19:00

Viking (Norway)	2–1	(Czech Republic) Sparta Prague
Vevatne 45'; Traoré 90+2'	Report	Zelený 42'

Viking Stadion, Stavanger
Attendance: 8,300
Referee: Visar Kastrati (Kosovo)

Viking won 2–1 on aggregate.
