= Arena Stožice =

Indoor arena in Ljubljana, Slovenia

Stožice Arena
- Zmajevo gnezdo (Dragon's Nest)
- Interior panorama view
- Interactive map of Stožice Arena
- Location: Ljubljana, Slovenia
- Coordinates: 46°4′52″N 14°31′17″E
- Owner: City Municipality of Ljubljana
- Operator: Javni zavod Šport Ljubljana
- Capacity: 12,480 (basketball, handball, volleyball); 14,500 (music events); 10,500 (ice hockey)
- Surface: Adaptable

Construction
- Groundbreaking: 2009
- Built: 2010
- Opened: 10 August 2010
- Cost: €66.3 million
- Architect: Sadar + Vuga d.o.o.
- General contractor: Grep d.o.o.

Tenants
- KK Cedevita Olimpija; RK Krim

The Stožice Arena (Slovene: Arena Stožice) is a multi-purpose indoor arena located in Ljubljana, Slovenia. It was designed by Slovenian Sadar + Vuga architects and is the biggest indoor arena in the country. It lies in the Bežigrad district, north of the city centre. The arena is part of the Stožice Sports Park sports complex.

The arena is the home ground of basketball club KK Cedevita Olimpija.

== History ==
Exterior view of Arena Stožice

The arena is named after the area in which it is located, and the change of the name is possible in the future due to sponsorship rights. Together with the football stadium, it is part of the Stožice Sports Park. The arena building area measures 14,164 square meters. It was constructed in just 14 months and opened on 10 August 2010 with a basketball match between Slovenia and Spain, which was won by Spain 79–72 after overtime.

The arena has a capacity of 12,480 seats for basketball and is located in the northwestern part of the sports park. The four levels of concourses and the lower, VIP and upper stands are covered by a shell-shaped dome. It is used for indoor sports such as basketball, handball and volleyball. The arena was also planned to host ice hockey games, but was later deemed unsuitable due to underground heating. Alongside the stadium, the arena is also designed to host many cultural events.

Arena Stožice was one of the four venues of the 2022 European Women's Handball Championship, and co-hosted EuroBasket Women 2023. The venue is also set to host the group stage of EuroBasket 2029.

== Gallery ==
Volleyball configuration in 2013

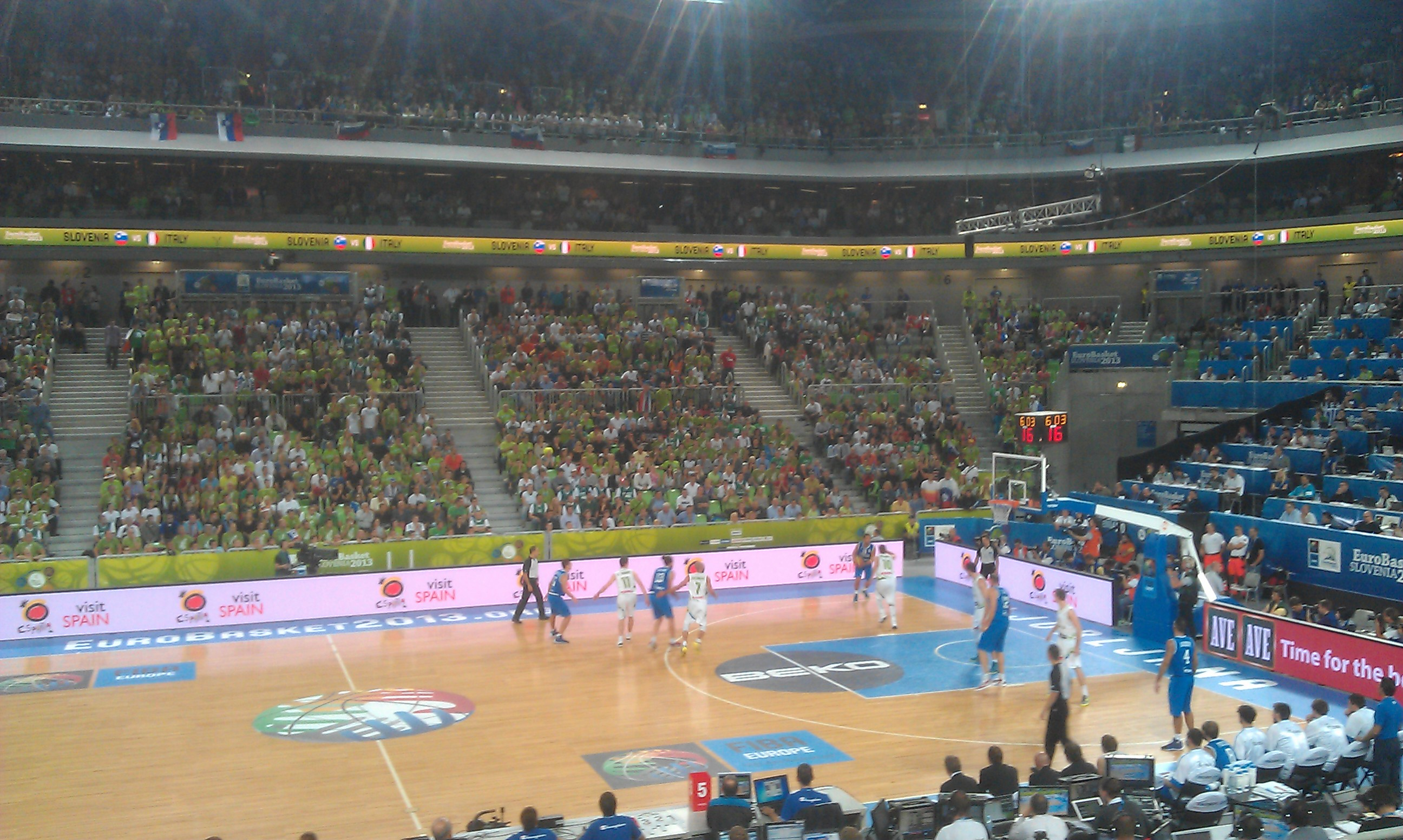
Stožice during EuroBasket 2013

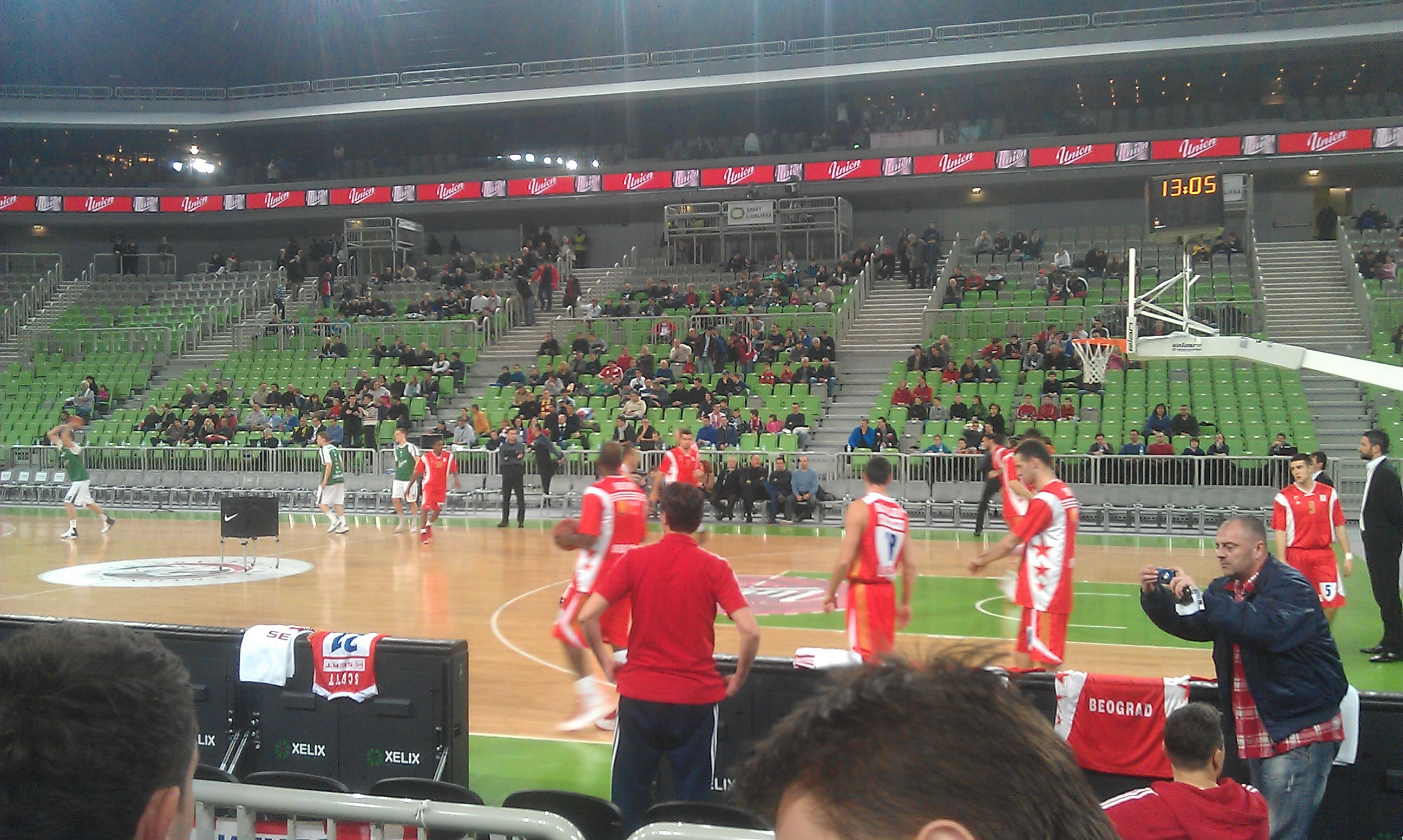
Stožice in 2013

== See also ==
- List of events held in the Stožice Arena
- List of indoor arenas in Slovenia

| Preceded by Žalgiris Arena; Kaunas | FIBA EuroBasket; Final venue 2013 | Succeeded by Stade Pierre-Mauroy; Lille |
| Preceded by Belgrade Arena; Belgrade | UEFA Futsal Championship; Final venue 2018 | Succeeded by Ziggo Dome; Amsterdam |
| Preceded by Jyske Bank Boxen; Herning | European Women's Handball Championship; Final venue 2022 | Succeeded by Wiener Stadthalle; Zürich |
| Preceded by Pavelló Municipal Font de Sant Lluís; Valencia | FIBA Women's EuroBasket; Final venue 2023 | Succeeded by Peace and Friendship Stadium; Piraeus |
