= Mavretič =

Mavretič is a Slovene surname. Notable people with the surname include:

- Anton Mavretič (1934–2019), Slovenian electrical engineer
- Josephus L. Mavretic (born 1934), American politician from North Carolina
- Til Mavretič (born 1997), Slovenian footballer
