= Stožice Stadium =

Football stadium

- Zmajevo gnezdo (Dragon's Nest)
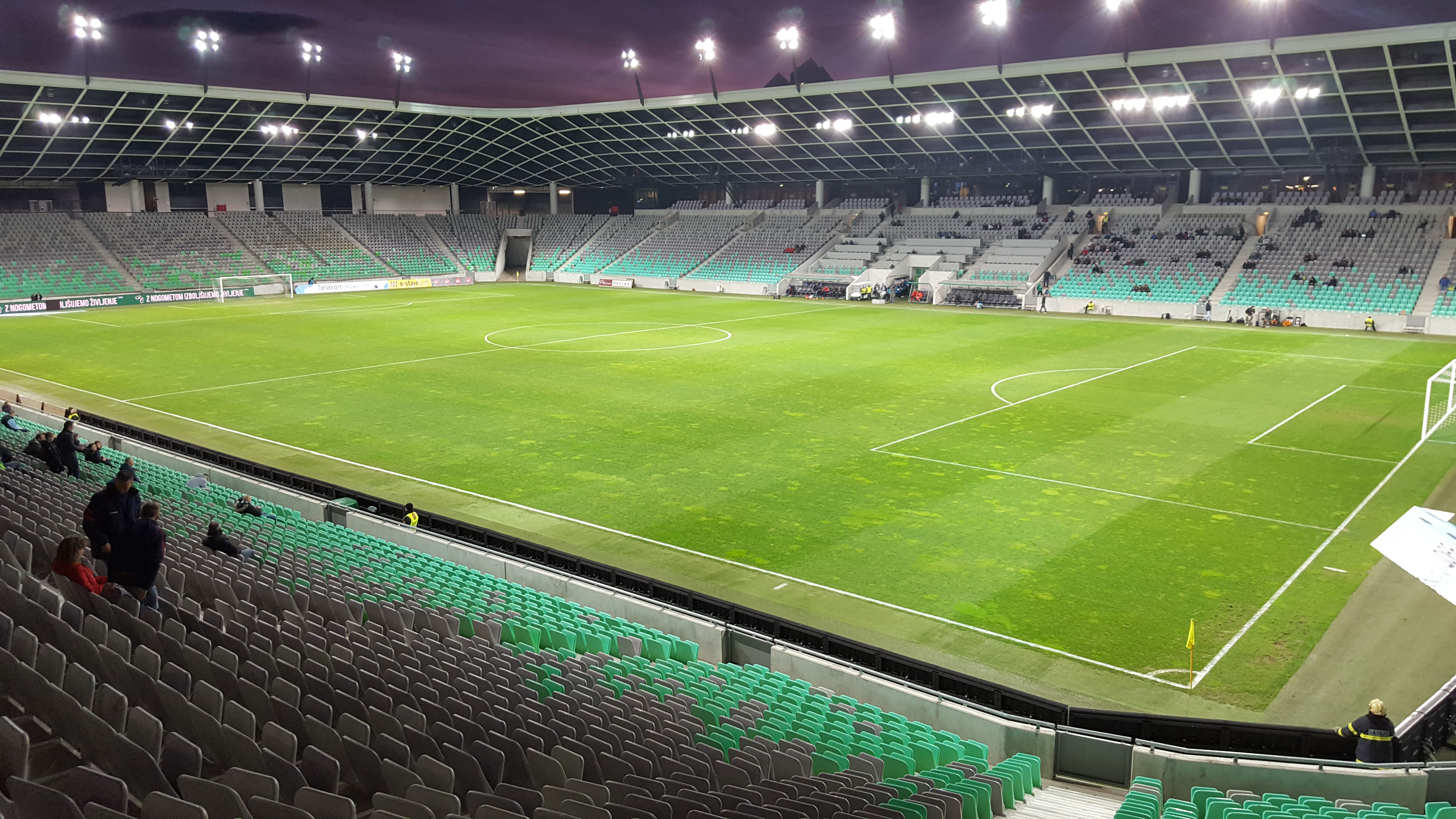
- Stožice Stadium in 2016; UEFA Category 4 stadium
- Interactive map of Stožice Stadium
- Location: Ljubljana, Slovenia
- Coordinates: 46°4′50″N 14°31′28″E
- Owner: City Municipality of Ljubljana
- Operator: Javni zavod Šport Ljubljana
- Capacity: 16,038 (football)
- Surface: Natural grass
- Record attendance: 16,432; Slovenia vs Kazakhstan (20 November 2023); Slovenia vs Portugal (26 March 2024)
- Field size: 105 by 68 metres (115 by 74 yards)

Construction
- Groundbreaking: 2009
- Built: 2010
- Opened: 11 August 2010
- Architect: Sadar + Vuga d.o.o
- General contractor: GREP d.o.o.

Tenants
- Olimpija Ljubljana (2010–present); Bravo (2024–present); Slovenia national football team (2010–present)

Stožice Stadium (Slovene: Stadion Stožice) is a multi-purpose stadium located in Ljubljana, Slovenia. It was designed by Sadar + Vuga architects and is the biggest football stadium in the country. It lies in the Bežigrad district, north of the city centre. The stadium is part of the Stožice Sports Park sports complex.

The stadium is the home ground of Olimpija Ljubljana and is the main venue of the Slovenia national football team. In addition to football, the stadium is also intended for cultural events.

== History ==
The stadium was named after the area in which it is located, and a change of the name is possible in the future due to sponsorship rights. Together with an indoor arena, it is a part of the Stožice Sports Park. The stadium's built-up area measures 24.614 square metres. It was constructed in 14 months and was opened on 11 August 2010 in a football friendly match between the national teams of Slovenia and Australia, won by Slovenia 2–0.

The stadium has a capacity of 16,038 spectators and is laid out under the plateau of the park. The stadium also has 558 VIP seats and 97 spots for people with disabilities. The stadium's press area can accommodate 210 journalists. As a structure, the stadium is 'sunk' into the park. Only the roof over the stands rises above the plane of the park as a monolithic crater.

For cultural purposes such as music concerts, the stadium capacity is increased to over 20,000.

== Football ==
The stadium is mainly used for football and is the home ground of football club Olimpija Ljubljana. In addition, the stadium is also the home venue of the Slovenia national football team, and has hosted 61 national team matches as of September 2026. In 2021, the stadium was one of the eight hosts of the 2021 UEFA European Under-21 Championship, and also hosted the final between Germany and Portugal.

== Culture ==
Although the stadium was primarily built for football, it is also intended to host a number of cultural events. The first was a joint project of two comedians, Lado Bizovičar and Jurij Zrnec, entitled Notpadu lajv?!, on 20 September 2010. Over 20,000 people gathered at this event.

== Records ==
On 20 November 2023, 16,432 spectators gathered for the UEFA Euro 2024 qualifying match between Slovenia and Kazakhstan, which is the highest attendance of any football match in Slovenia since the country's independence in 1991. The attendance record was later tied on 26 March 2024, when Slovenia hosted Portugal in a friendly match.

== See also ==
- List of football stadiums in Slovenia
