= Stožice Sports Park =

Multi-use sports complex in Ljubljana, Slovenia

- Aerial view of Stožice Sports Park in 2011
- Interactive map of Stožice Sports Park
- Location: Ljubljana, Slovenia
- Coordinates: 46°4′50″N 14°31′27″E
- Owner: City Municipality of Ljubljana
- Operator: Javni zavod Šport Ljubljana
- Capacity: Stadium: 16,038; Arena: 12,480

Construction
- Groundbreaking: 2009
- Built: 2009–2010
- Opened: August 2010
- Cost: €119 million
- Architect: Sadar + Vuga d.o.o.
- General contractor: GREP d.o.o

Tenants
- Slovenia national football team Slovenia national basketball team Slovenia men's national handball team NK Olimpija Ljubljana; RK Krim; KK Cedevita Olimpija

Stožice Sports Park (Slovene: Športni park Stožice) is a multi-use sports complex in Ljubljana, Slovenia, that hosts basketball and football departments of sports club Olimpija Ljubljana. The sports park is located in Bežigrad District, north of the city centre and next to the highway bypass.

== History ==
Street-level view of Stožice Sports Park

The inaugural event was held on 10 August 2010, when Arena Stožice hosted a basketball match between Slovenia and Spain, which was won by Spain 79–72 after overtime. The next day, Stožice Stadium hosted a football match between Slovenia and Australia, won by Slovenia 2–0.

The stadium and the arena are used as main venues of Slovenian national teams in football, basketball and handball, and as venues for concerts and other culture events.

== Construction ==
Construction of the venue commenced in June 2009 and was completed in August 2010. The complex was built at an estimated cost of €119 million (of which €9 million was provided by the European Commission), with €55 million spent on the stadium and the remaining €64 million on the arena. In addition to the arena and stadium, the complex was also to encompass a large shopping centre, however, the latter was never constructed due to lack of funding and is currently without a clear timeline for completion. Further controversy arose in March 2011, when it was revealed that the European Commission had demanded of the Government of Slovenia to produce a report on the bidding process, alleging that the process for obtaining EC funds had been rigged in a way which positioned this particular project as the only in Slovenia to qualify for said funds. A month later, Slovenia's Office for Local Self-Government and Regional Policy completed the revision of the bidding process and reported certain irregularities.
