= Herman Potočnik Noordung Center of Space Technologies =

Coordinates: 46°22′59.3″N 15°17′42.76″E

Cultural Centre of European Space Technologies (KSEVT)

The Cultural Centre of European Space Technologies (KSEVT) is the headquarters of an eponymous institute, promoting research in the fields of space culturalization. Moreover, it is the central cultural venue in Vitanje, where the family of Herman Potočnik Noordung, the spaceflight pioneer, originates from.

== History ==
=== Opening ===
KSEVT was officially opened on September 6, 2012. The opening ceremony hosted the Swiss art collective Cod.Act with their performance Pendulum Choir. Opening speeches were held by Danilo Türk, former president of the Republic of Slovenia, Žiga Turk, head of former Ministry of Education, Science, Culture and Sport (Slovenia), Yuri Baturin, head of the S. I. Vavilov Institute for History of Science and Technology at the Russian Academy of Sciences, Lojze Peterle, a Member of the European Parliament, Anton Mavretič, a Slovenian scientist, active in the programmes of MIT, NASA and the Boston University, and through a direct video connection with the International Space Station, Yuri Malenchenko, Russian cosmonaut, also greeted the public. The final act of the opening was made by Majda Širca, former head of Ministry of Culture (Slovenia).

=== Events ===
From the opening to the end of August 2014, KSEVT hosts a large permanent exhibition Herman Potočnik Noordung: 100 Monumental Influences. This exhibition focuses on the historical influences and future potentials of the 100 drawings Potočnik made for his book in 1928/29. There are also two large exhibitions in preparation: Space Sight (2014-2016) and Cinematography and Space (2016-2018).

From September 2012 to the end of August 2013 a museum original of the first satellite Sputnik 1 and the original Russian spacesuits Sokol-KV2 (Hawk) and Orlan M (Eagle) from the Star City were exhibited within the set of the Potočnik exhibition.

The work of KSEVT was first presented to the global expert public on the 63rd International Astronautical Congress in Naples, Italy. The congress was organized by the International Astronautical Federation.

From October 2013 to the end of August 2014, the Voyager/Mavretič exhibition was open for visitors, alongside the exhibition of Potočnik. The central artifact in the setup was the original alternate PLS instrument from the Voyager programme. Anton Mavretič, a space engineer with Slovenian roots, was one of the chief constructors of this instrument at the MIT.

== Current status ==
- Since 2017, the Herman Potočnik Noordung Center of Space Technologies has operated as a public institution, co-founded by the Slovenian Ministry of Economic Development and Technology and the Municipality of Vitanje.
- Its fundamental mission is to research, collect, and disseminate knowledge about space and space technologies to the public, merging science, economy, tourism, and art.
- The Center hosts permanent and temporary exhibitions, multimedia applications, and participates in international and EU-funded projects (including Horizon Europe, SEED, and Interreg Alpine Space).
- The governing Council consists of 7 members: 4 nominated by the Ministry, 1 by the municipality, 1 employee representative, and 1 public representative.
- As of 2023, the Center provides educational and artistic content on topics such as Earth observation, human space settlement (Copernicus Sentinel satellites), and space architecture.
- The institution’s funding comes from both public sources and commercial activities.
- Exhibitions include the legacy of Herman Potočnik Noordung and his foundational book “The Problem of Space Travel” (1929) as a centerpiece.

== Architecture ==
The architectural design of KSEVT was created by four architect bureaus: Bevk-Perović, Dekleva-Gregorič, OFIS and Sadar + Vuga. The design derives from the plans for a habitable wheel, one of the three parts of a geostationary space station which is described in Potočnik's book Das Problem der Befahrung des Weltraums - der Raketen-Motor (The Problem of Space Travel - The Rocket Motor).

The building is a concrete monolith object that consists of two low cylinders. In the dynamical relation of these two, an impression of levitation and rotation is created. Central hall is surrounded by the main exhibition area, and they are both connected with a round opening in the middle. The authors wished to stress how the local community programme and the scientific programme of KSEVT interact. At the highest point of the circular exhibition area there is a transition to the smaller cylinder of the building – to the first floor where study and research activities take place. There is also a special library - the Treasury of Modernity.

KSEVT's architects received the Slovenian national award for architecture: Plečnik's Award 2013, the Zlati svinčnik (Golden Pencil) Award 2013 and Trend Award 2012. They were among the nominees of the European Union Prize for Contemporary Architecture Mies van der Rohe Award.

== Programme ==
The main programme is accompanied by a set of smaller, temporary exhibitions, conferences, symposia, lectures, and other events in the fields of space culturalization. KSEVT focuses its work mainly on the research and development of the programmes of space culturalization. Composite missions are designed to intertwine science and art, stressing the importance of humanistic sciences and modern art in space exploration through various conferences, workshops and future residence programme for young artists and scientists. Their aim is to gradually develop cultural applications as an enhancement of the existing space programmes. KSEVT also carries out museum and exhibition activities which engage in space research, publishing, education and production of exhibitions and events. The third and main activity of KSEVT are the multimedia educational programmes for primary (elementary) and secondary (high) schools.

Slovenian high profile institutions that collaborate with KSEVT are the Research Centre of the Slovenian Academy of Sciences and Arts, Slovenian Science Foundation and Slovenska matica.

== See also ==
- Dragan Živadinov, DELAK Institute
- Herman Potočnik, European pioneer of spaceflight
- Nahum, KOSMICA Institute
