= Klapa Šufit =

Music group

Klapa Šufit is a musical group from Split, Croatia.

Klapa Šufit is a group of male singers who perform klapa music, a cappella multi-part singing, in a traditional way typical of Dalmatia, Croatia. They also perform modern klapa music featuring full instrumentation. Their most popular song is "Ne Diraj Moju Ljubav," which is also the title track of their third album.

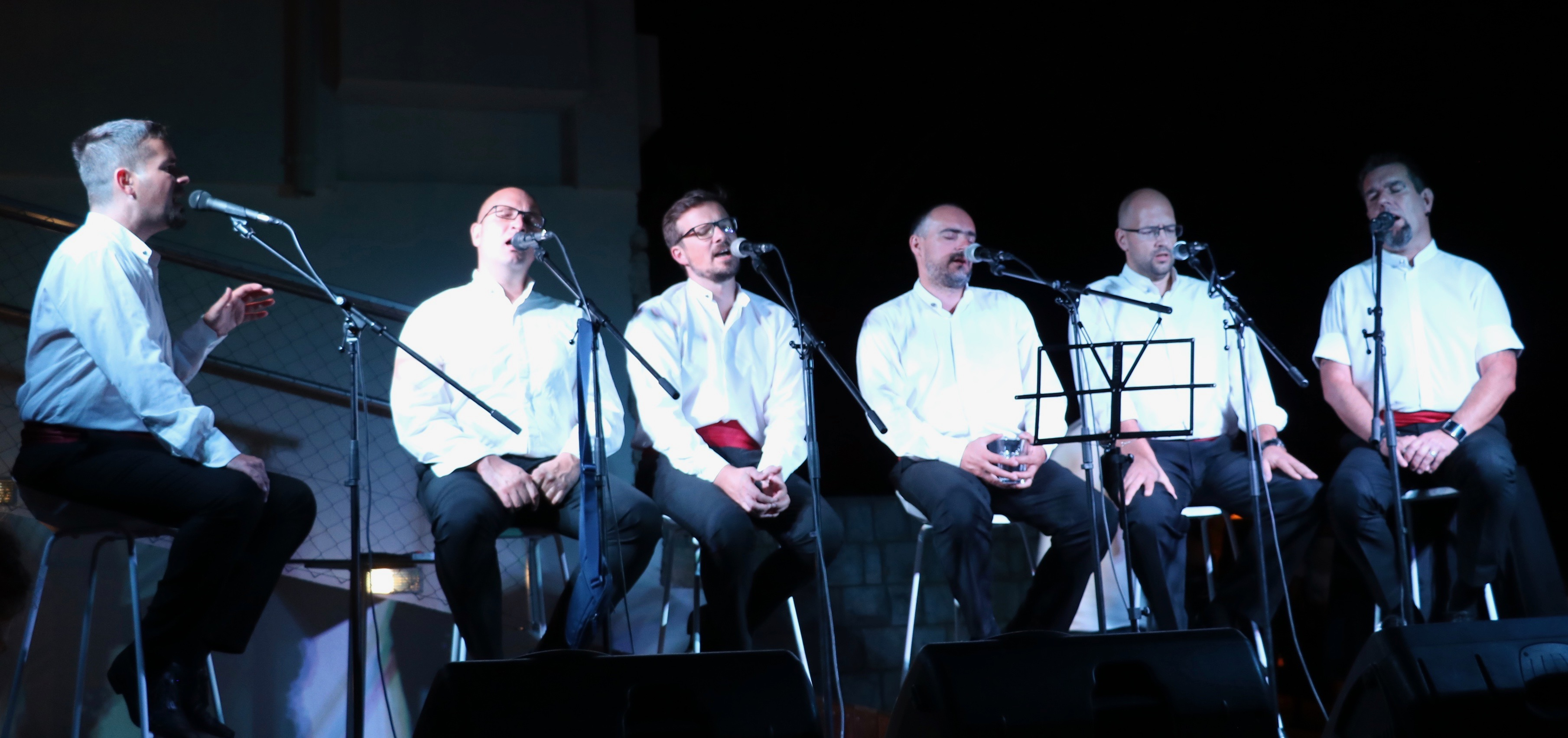
Klapa Šufit in Podgora, Croatia.

== About Klapa Šufit ==
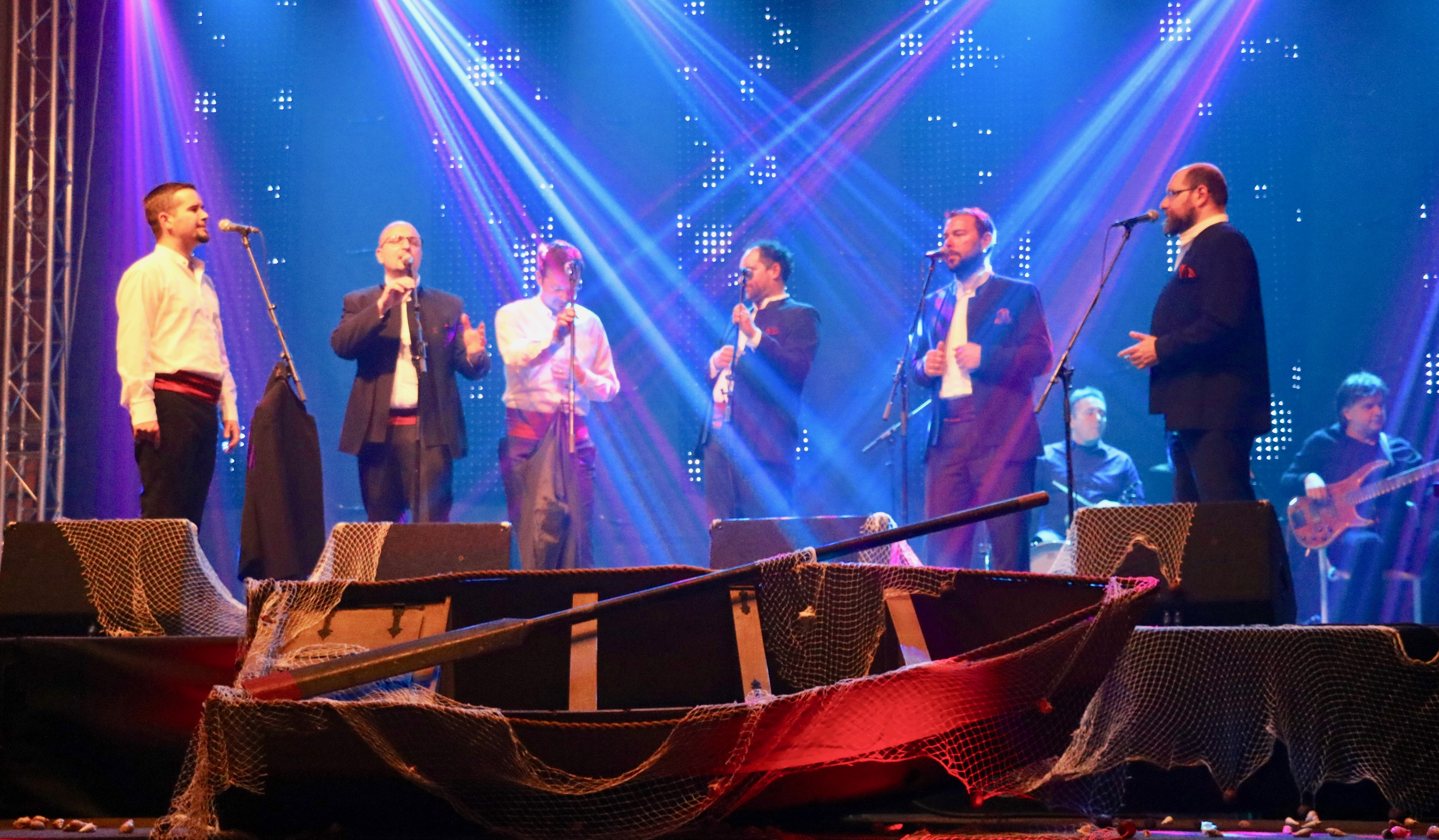
Klapa Šufit in Slovenia, 2016.

In the autumn of 1992, in the attic of Split’s 4th Gymnasium "Marko Marulić", the young and talented music professor Mr. Tomislav Versic gathered a group of students into a small vocal group, in Croatia known as “klapa”. (“Klapa” is a group of male or female singers who perform a cappella multi-part singing, typical for Dalmatia.) They named themselves Klapa Šufit as they were practicing in the school attic (Šufit is Croatian dialect for attic). A year and a half later, the students had their first successful appearance at the Festival of Dalmatian vocal groups in Omiš, competing as the youngest male vocal group contestant in the history of the most important festival of klapa singing.

Over the years, Klapa Šufit has grown into a renowned and innovative klapa group. Directed in its infancy by the experienced bard Dusko Tambaca, Klapa Šufit has been preserving and promoting this beautiful UNESCO-protected singing style typical of Split, the administrative and historical centre of Dalmatia. By regular appearances at the historic Omiš Klapa Festiva, Klapa Šufit reached the peak of klapa singing. In 1999, Klapa Šufit won the third award by audience vote. By the end of the same year, Klapa Šufit recorded its first album “Good Morning, Sea”. The album was promoted through various concerts, of which the most important of all was a concert in Croatian National Theatre in Split, performed in front of the cameras for national television, with great support of the audience and of music critics.

Beginning in 2006, Klapa Šufit was conducted by professor Jasminko Setka. With rarely-seen synergy between music pedagogue and klapa members, they achieved success unique in the history of klapa singing and competition. Klapa Šufit was winner of the Festival in Omis three years in a row (in 2006, 2007, and 2008), as awarded by the votes of the professional jury and by the votes of the audience. In 2009, Klapa Šufit recorded a new CD, ‘’Ponoc je mila moja majko’’ ("It's midnight, my dear mother") with songs that have won many prizes. Then in 2012, they released their first CD of music with full instrumentation, "Ne Diraj Moju Ljubav." The title track has become one of the most famous klapa songs of all time.

Klapa Šufit has achieved success in performances in Croatia and abroad, in cooperation with other klapa groups and stage artists and in numerous music festivals. They have a large fan base in Croatia and Slovenia (where they have a fan club), and their popularity has recently increased throughout the world, with a Klapa Šufit Fan Club of North America being founded in 2016.

Born in the attic of their local high school, and singing songs of their grandfathers, Klapa Šufit has climbed all the way to the top—to "the attic"—of Dalmatian traditional klapa singing.

== Discography ==
- The first studio album Dobro jutro more ("Good morning, sea") was recorded in 1999 and released under the minor local record label "BeSTMUSIC".
- The second studio album Ponoć je mila moja majko ("It's midnight, my dear mother") was recorded in 2009 and released under the minor local record label "Scardona".
  - Track listing:
  1. Ponoc je, mila moja majko (It's midnight, my dear mother)
  2. Zeleni skoju, dobra duso (Green islet, kind soul)
  3. Spusta se noc (The night falls)
  4. Ruka moja, sto si takla (Hand of mine, her face you touch)
  5. Ako si jubo posla spat (If you have gone to sleep)
  6. Perusce besid (The story of leaves )
  7. Ja odlazin draga (I'm leaving my dear)
  8. Kljuc zivota (Key of life)
  9. Otka' te znam (Since I know you)
  10. Leute moj (My fishing sloop)
  11. Tuzni snovi, bol prosjaka (sad dreams, the pain of the poor)
- The third studio album Ne Diraj Moju Ljubav (released in 2012)
- The fourth studio album Oprosti Dušo (released in 2018)

== Members ==
Over the years, the members of the group have changed; since 2006, the members have included the following:

- Igor Jelaska - 1st tenor,

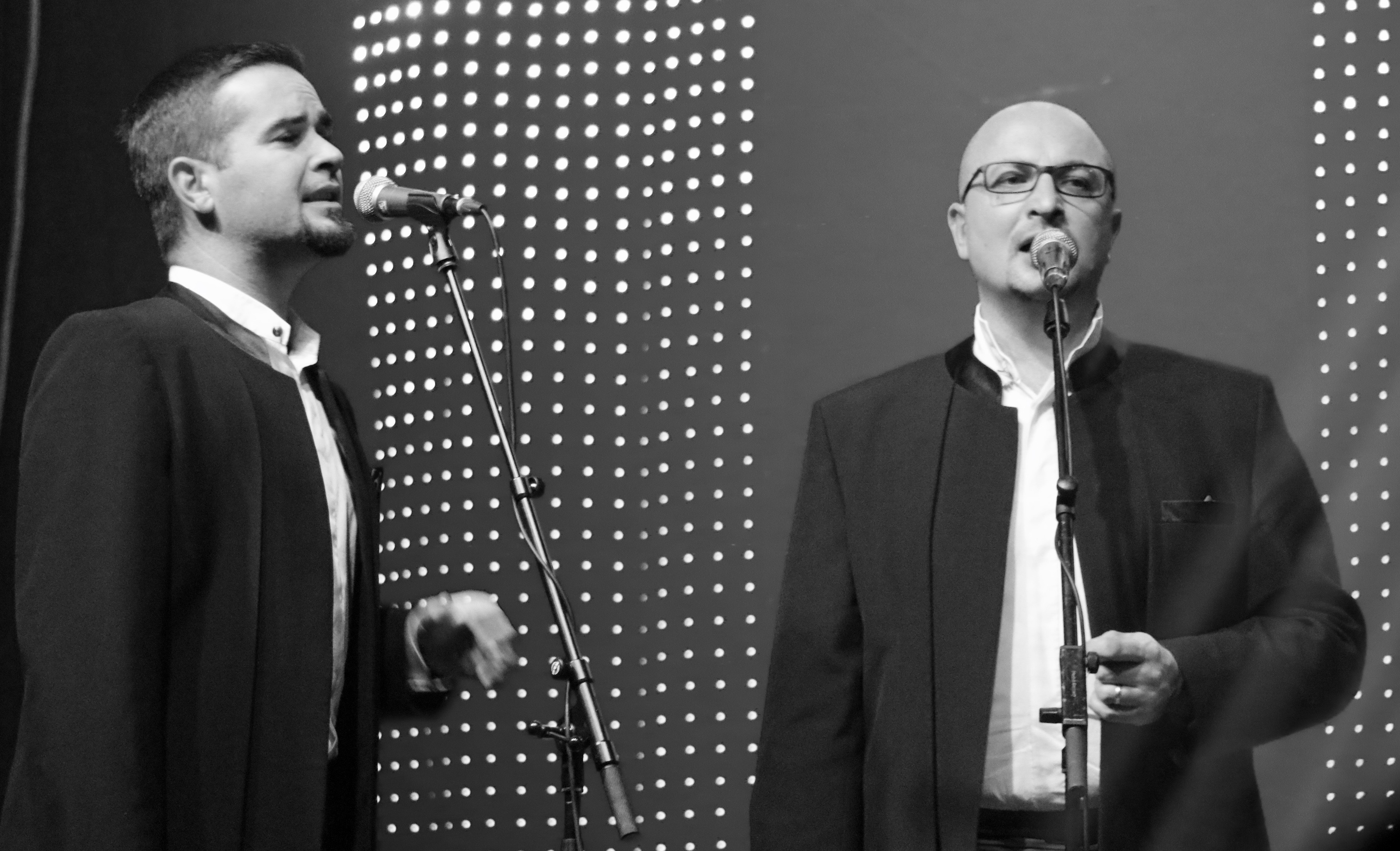
Igor Jelaska and Jurica Nazlić

- Jurica Nazlić - 2nd tenor,
- Teo Bikić - 2nd tenor,
- Marko Lasić - 2nd tenor,
- Ivan Bratincević - baritone,
- Kresimir Grgić - baritone,
- Zvonimir Kovacic - baritone,
- Nikola Akrap - first bass,
- Bruno Vucica - first bass,
- Teo Turk - second bass,
- Zdeslav Mišurac - second bass

conductor: Jasminko Setka

== Awards and acknowledgements ==
- "Golden shield with historical emblem of the town Omiš" (2006, 2007, 2008) presented to the most successful vocal group according to the votes of the jury in the finals of the Festival of Dalmatian vocal groups in Omiš
- "Golden Omiš" Award (2006, 2007, 2008) presented to the most successful vocal group according to the votes of the audience in the finals of the Dalmatian vocal groups in Omiš
- "Golden cherries of Kaštela" (2009) awarded by the jury at the Festival of Dalmatian songs in Kaštela.
- The award for the outstanding contribution to traditional Dalmatian singing (2009), given by the Festival of Dalmatian vocal groups.
- The first prize of the jury at the 2017 Šibenik Šansone Festival for their performance of "Uzelo te nebo suncu."
