= Chamber of Commerce and Industry of Slovenia =

Slovenian non-governmental organisation

Building of the Chamber of Commerce and Industry (2007)

The Chamber of Commerce and Industry of Slovenia (Slovene: Gospodarska zbornica Slovenije; acronym: GZS) is a non-governmental organisation representing the interests of the Slovenian economy. It has the function of an informational body in the sense of economic and business services and protects the interests of its members in the field of economic policy. Its headquarters are located at 13 Dimitz Street (Dimičeva ulica) in the Bežigrad District of Ljubljana. The building was erected in 1999 according to plans by the Sadar + Vuga architecture bureau.
