= Big Foot Mama =

Slovenian rock band

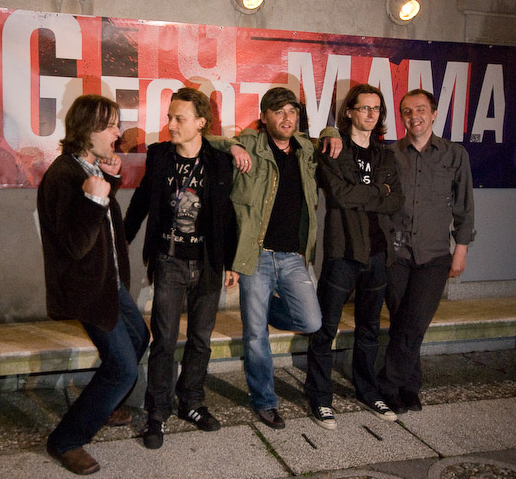
Big Foot Mama in 2009

Big Foot Mama is a rock band from Ljubljana, Slovenia. It is one of the most popular Slovenian pop rock bands of the 1990s.

The group started their career in 1990. After their third album, Tretja dimenzija (The Third Dimension), they were already considered as the Slovenian pop rock band of the decade, breaking sales records in rock category and selling out some of the biggest venues in the Slovenian capital Ljubljana like Križanke and Hala Tivoli, which were previously considered as unconquerable for Slovenian rock bands.

== Current lineup ==
- Grega Skočir - vocals
- Daniel Gregorič - guitars
- Alen Steržaj - bass
- Jože Habula - drums
- Zoran Čalić - guitars

== Discography ==
- Nova pravila (New Rules) - 1995
- Kaj se dogaja? (What Is Going On?) - 1997
- Tretja dimenzija (Third Dimension) - 1999
- Doba norih (Age of the Mad) - 2001
- Big Foot Mama [best of] - 2003
- 5ing (Petting) - 2004
- 15 let v živo z gosti (15 Years - Live with Guests) - 2006
- Važn, da zadane (Important, that it Hits) - 2007
- Izhod (Exit) - 2012
- Plameni v raju (Flames In Paradise) - 2018
