= Noordung (NSK) =

Noordung (also Cosmokinetic Cabinet Noordung) are a Slovenian theatre group; founded in 1983 under the name of Scipion Nasice Sisters Theatre they were, in 1984, a founding member of the Neue Slowenische Kunst collective. They were also known 1987–1990 as Red Pilot Theater.

The group are named after Herman Potočnik (pseudonym: Hermann Noordung), an early 20th-century Slovene rocket engineer and pioneer of astronautics.
