= Salko Nargalić =

Bosnian footballer

Personal information
- Date of birth: 16 July 2001 (age 25)
- Place of birth: Sarajevo, Bosnia and Herzegovina
- Height: 1.92 m (6 ft 4 in)
- Position: Forward

Team information
- Current team: Radnik Hadžići
- Number: 9

Youth career
- –2020: Sarajevo

Senior career*
Years	Team	Apps	(Gls)
2021	Željezničar	1	(0)
2021–2023	Tuzla City	10	(3)
2021–2022	→ Orašje (loan)	26	(11)
2023–	Radnik Hadžići	15	(3)
- * Club domestic league appearances and goals as of 18 November 2023

Salko Nargalić (born 16 July 2001) is a Bosnian professional footballer who plays as a forward for First League of FBiH club Radnik Hadžići.

== Club career ==
=== Tuzla City ===
In July 2021, Nargalić signed a contract with Bosnian club Tuzla City, however, they sent him to Orašje on loan until the end of the season. After Nargalic finished season with Orašje, he returned to Tuzla City for European campaign. In first match against Tre Penne in San Marino, Nargalić scored two goals. In February 2023, Nargalić left the club.

=== Radnik Hadžići ===
In July 2023, Nargalić signed a contract with Bosnian club Radnik Hadžići.

== Career statistics ==
=== Club ===
As of match played 29 November 2023

Appearances and goals by club, season and competition
Club	Season	League			National cup (Note: Appearance(s) in Bosnia and Herzegovina Football Cup)		Europe		Total	
Club	Season	League	Apps	Goals	Apps	Goals	Apps	Goals	Apps	Goals
Željezničar	2020–21	Bosnian Premier League	1	0	0	0	—		1	0
Tuzla City	2021–22	Bosnian Premier League	0	0	0	0	0	0	0	0
Tuzla City	2022–23	Bosnian Premier League	10	3	1	0	2 (Note: Appearance(s) in UEFA Europa Conference League)	2	13	5
Tuzla City	Total		10	3	1	0	2	2	13	5
Orašje (loan)	2021–22	First League of FBiH	26	11	0	0	–		26	11
Radnik Hadžići	2023–24	First League of FBiH	15	3	1	0	—		16	3
Career total			52	17	2	0	2	2	56	19
