= Herman Potočnik =

Austrian military officer, electrical engineer and astronautics theorist (1892–1929)

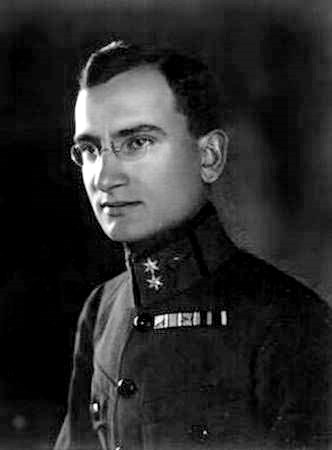
- Born: 22 December 1892; Pola, Austrian Littoral, Austria-Hungary
- Died: 27 August 1929 (aged 36); Vienna, Austria

Herman Potočnik (pseudonym Hermann Noordung; 22 December 1892 – 27 August 1929) was an Austrian officer, electrical engineer and astronautics theorist. He is regarded as a pioneer and visionary of modern space flight and is remembered mainly for his work concerning the long-term human habitation of space.

== Early life ==
Potočnik was born in Pola (now Pula), Istria, then part of the Austria-Hungarian monarchy (now in Croatia). His family was of Slovene ethnicity and originated from Lower Styria (now Slovenia).

His father Jožef was born in 1841 in Zgornji Razbor and at the time of Herman's birth he served as a doctor and a navy officer of the Austro-Hungarian Navy harbour of Pola. His mother Minka was born February 7, 1854; she was a descendant of Czech immigrants, manufacturers of crucibles for glass-making, and a daughter of a well known wine merchant and local councillor Jožef Kokošinek from Maribor (born in Vitanje). In 1866, Herman's father Jožef participated with the second Battle of Vis, where the Austrian Navy commanded by Wilhelm von Tegetthoff defeated the Royal Italian Navy. Jožef was later a general in the Austro-Hungarian Army.

When Herman's father died in 1894, his mother relocated the family to Maribor. Herman had two brothers, Adolf and Gustav (who were both navy officers), and a sister Frančiška (Franci). He spent most of his childhood years in Maribor and, according to oral sources, in Vitanje.

The meaning of his German-like pseudonym Noordung is still a mystery, but some suggest that he used it to indicate the problems of chaos (German: Ordnung, "order"; ordunga in Slovene colloquial language). Assuming that the initial "N" was intended as a negation, the name could mean "no order".

== Education and military service ==
In Maribor, Potočnik attended primary school. Afterward he attended the military secondary schools in Fischau and Hranice in Moravia. His uncle Heinrich was a major-general in the army, and probably enabled his study at Austrian military schools. From 1910 to 1913 he studied at the Imperial and Royal Technical Military Academy in Mödling in Lower Austria (Niederösterreich) near Vienna and graduated as an engineer second lieutenant. His specialization was building of railways and bridges.

During World War I he served in Galicia, Serbia and Bosnia and in 1915 he was promoted to the rank of First Lieutenant (Oberleutnant). He was assigned to the southwestern front of the Soča battlefield and there he experienced a breakthrough of the Austrian army to the river Piava and its retreat. In 1919 he was pensioned from the Austrian military with the rank of captain because of tuberculosis that he contracted during the war. He started to study electrical engineering in the mechanical engineering department of the University of Technology in Vienna, Austria, and was awarded a doctorate in engineering. From 1925 onward, he devoted himself entirely to the problems of rocket science and space technology. Owing to chronic illness, he did not find a job or marry, but lived with his brother Adolf in Vienna, Austria.

== The Problem of Space Travel ==
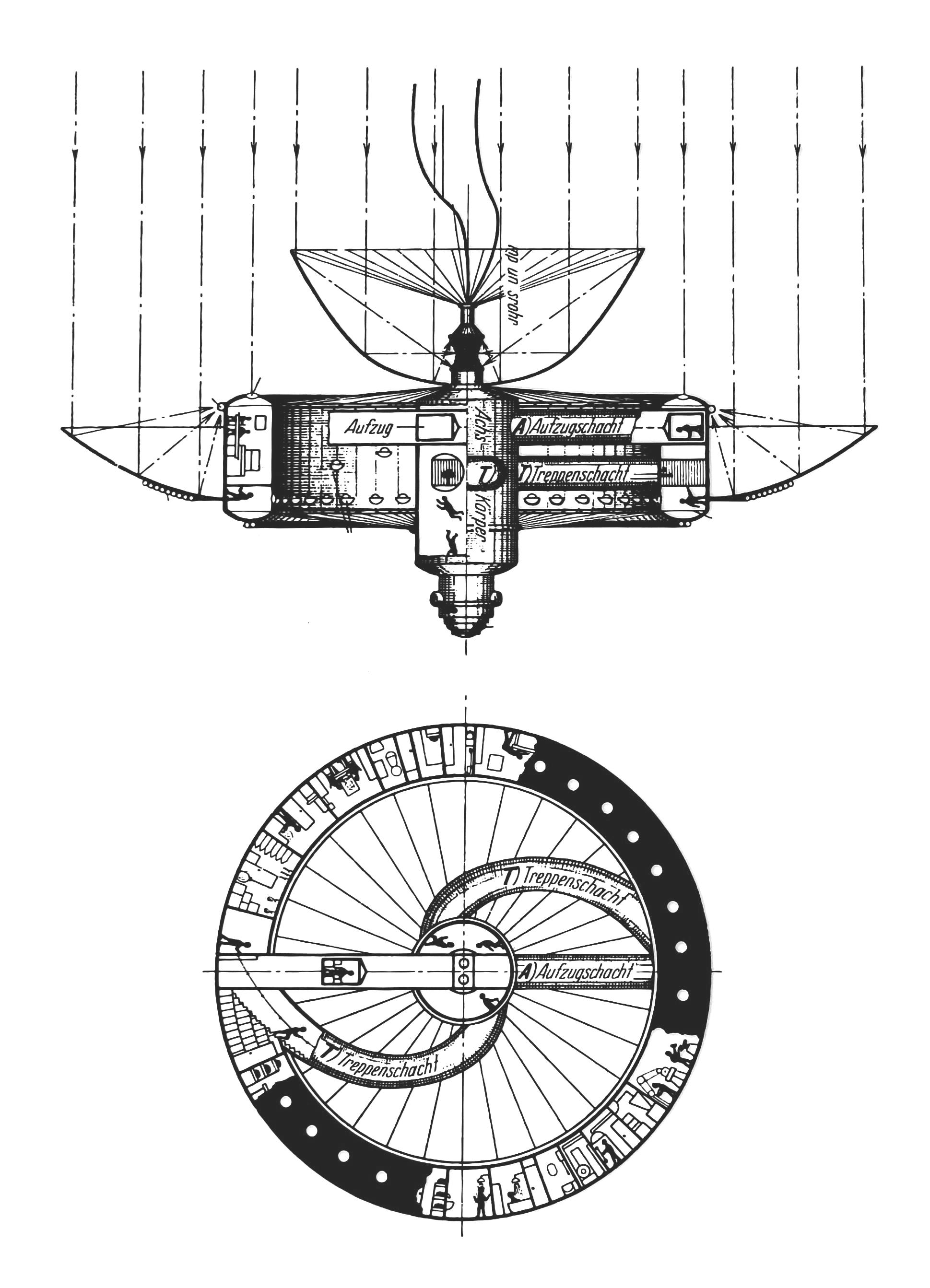
Description of a space station in Hermann Noordung's The Problem of Space Travel (1929). (Legend: Achs-Körper: axle body. Aufzugschacht: elevator shaft. Treppenschacht: stairwell. Verdampfungsrohr: boiler pipe).

At the end of 1928, he published his sole book, Das Problem der Befahrung des Weltraums – der Raketen-Motor (The Problem of Space Travel – The Rocket Motor) in Berlin. The publisher, Richard Carl Schmidt, printed the year 1929 as a publishing date, probably from a purely business motive (to keep the book looking new throughout the coming year) and this date is often mistakenly given as the actual date of publication. In 188 pages and 100 handmade illustrations, Potočnik described a plan for establishment of a permanent human presence in outer space. He conceived a detailed design for a space station, regarded by Russian and American historians of spaceflight to be the first space architecture. He described the use of orbiting spacecraft for detailed observation of the ground for peaceful and military purposes, and described how the special conditions of space could be useful for scientific experiments. Potočnik expressed strong doubts of the potentially destructive military use of these fresh discoveries.

The book was translated into Russian during early 1935, Slovene in 1986 (by the Slovenska matica), English in 1995 (by NASA) and Croatian in 2004 (by Marino Fonović, published by Labin Art Press). A partial translation to English, containing most of the essential chapters, was made as early as 1929 for the American magazine Science Wonder Stories and was issued in three parts (July, August and September 1929) and credited to "Captain Hermann Noordung, A.D., M.E., Berlin." The article was also published in Science Wonder Stories' affiliated publication Air Wonder Stories at the same time.

With his many ideas he became one of the founders of astronautics. His concepts were first considered seriously only by amateur rocketeers in Germany, the Verein für Raumschiffahrt (VfR – "Spaceflight Society"), the most notable of whom was Hermann Oberth. In its Russian edition, the book may also have influenced Sergey Korolev and his acquaintances. More locally, Viennese engineers dismissed his work as fantasy.

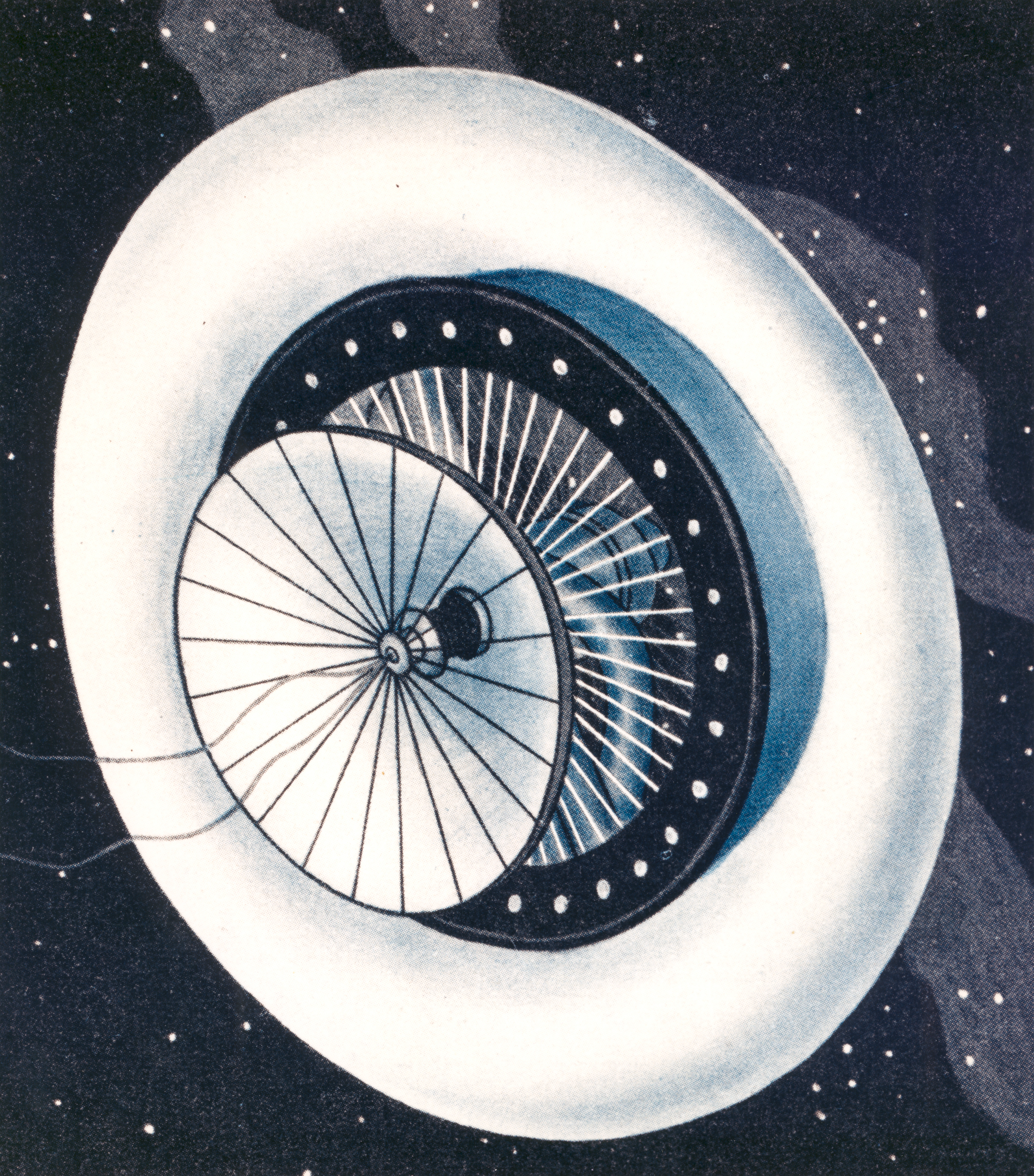
The space station Wohnrad (Living Wheel).

Potočnik's book described geostationary satellites (first proposed by Konstantin Tsiolkovsky) and discussed communication between them and the ground using radio, but did not suggest the idea of using satellites for mass broadcasting and as telecommunications relays (developed by Arthur C. Clarke in his article Wireless World of 1945). The wheel-shaped space station served as an inspiration for further development by Wernher von Braun (another former VfR member) in 1952. Von Braun considered orbiting space stations as intermediate to travel to other planets. In 1955 and 1968, George Pal's and Byron Haskin's Conquest of Space (based on Wernher von Braun's published concepts: first, several articles in Collier's magazine 1952–1954, co-written with Willy Ley and Chesley Bonestell, and later developed into books from Viking Press.) and Stanley Kubrick's movie 2001: A Space Odyssey, respectively, depicted such a role for "Space Station V".

=== Detailed Architectural Analysis of the Space Station Concept ===
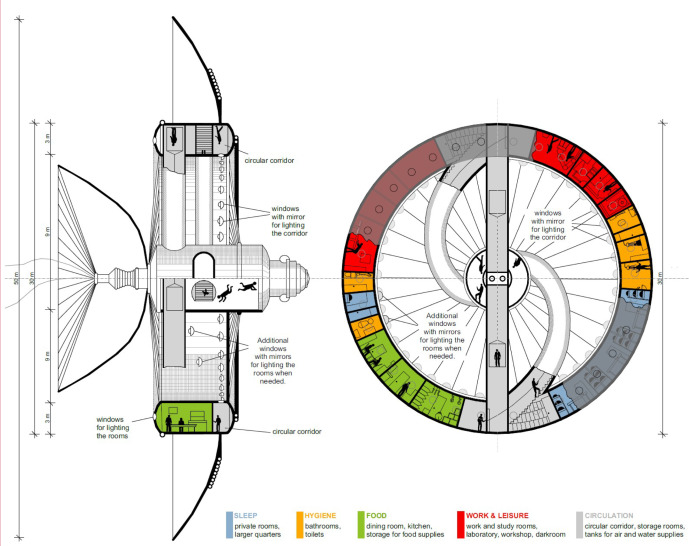
Noordung's space wheel drawing translated and marked

In recent research, Potočnik’s rotating wheel station ('Wohnrad') has been re-evaluated through digital reconstruction and architectural analysis, revealing details of the internal spatial organization, proportional relationships of habitat modules, and functional layout that were not fully described in earlier secondary sources. This research situates his design as a precursor to later rotating space habitat concepts and deepens our understanding of his intentions for human habitation in orbit.

== Death ==
Potočnik died of pneumonia at the age of 36 while in great poverty in Vienna, Austria, and was buried there. An obituary notice about his death was printed in one Maribor daily newspaper, mentioning his ranks (engineers and captain), his illness, but nothing about his work regarding space.

== Legacy ==
- Streets in Graz and Ljubljana now bear his name.
- A proposal was made during the late 1990s to name the International Space Station after him, but was not adopted.
- In 1999 a two-day international memorial symposium about his life and work was held at the University of Maribor, celebrating the 70th anniversary of the first printing of his famous book.
- Asteroid 19612 Noordung, found in 1999 at Črni Vrh Observatory, is named after him.
- In 2006, the Herman Potočnik Noordung Memorial Centre (HPNMC) was built in Vitanje, Slovenia.
- There is activity to construct a statue of Herman Potočnik in his birthplace of Pula.

Cultural Centre of European Space Technologies (KSEVT), inspired by his space station concept

- In 2012, the Cultural Centre of European Space Technologies (KSEVT), inspired by his work, was built in Vitanje, Slovenia.

== See also ==
- Timeline of space exploration
- Rotating wheel space station
- Noordung (NSK)
