= Anton Mavretič =

Slovenian electrical engineer (1934–2019)

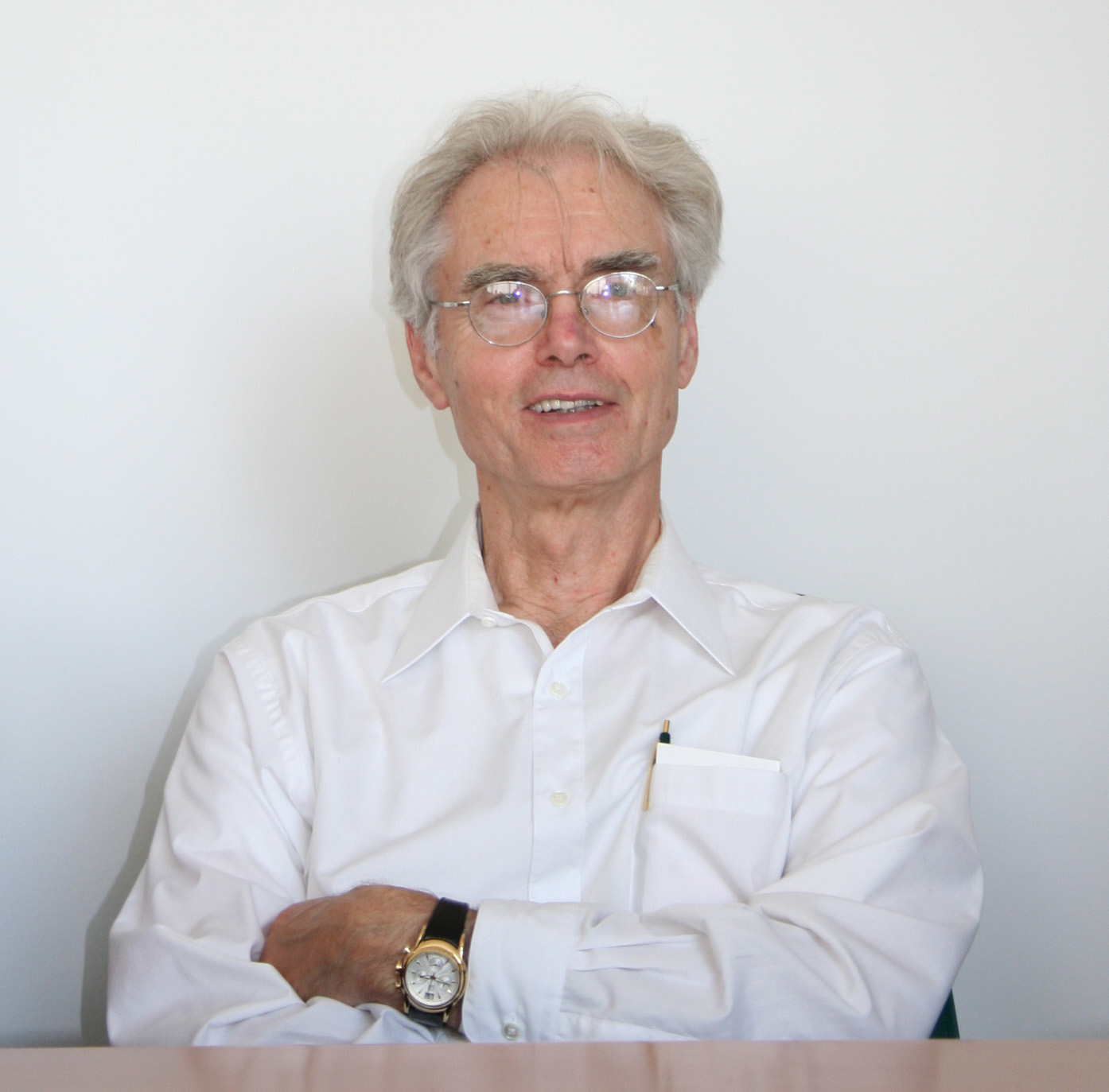
- Anton Mavretič in 2008
- Born: December 11, 1934; Boldraž, near Metlika, Slovenia
- Died: November 21, 2019 (aged 84); United States
- Occupation: Electrical engineer

Anton Mavretič (11 December 1934 – 21 November 2019) was a Slovene electrical engineer who worked in the United States.

Mavretič moved to the United States in 1957. He studied at the University of Denver and the Syracuse University. Then he worked at Westinghouse for two years developing color TV and finally studied at the Pennsylvania State University where he obtained PhD in ionospheric research. Later, he became an engineer at MIT where he worked on the Interplanetary Monitoring Platform. In 1978, he was employed at Harvard University and in 1980 became a professor and research associate at the Center for Space Physics at Boston University. He became a corresponding member of Slovenian Academy of Sciences and Arts in June 2007. In 1985 he founded the consulting firm SIAT of Boston LLC.

Mavretič worked for the MIT Center for Space Research under contract for NASA from 1972 to 1979 and contributed to the development of plasma spectrometers for the Voyager 1 and Voyager 2 projects.

== Education ==
- Bachelor of science in electrical engineering from the University of Denver, December, 1959
- Master of science in electrical engineering from the University of Denver, June, 1961
- PhD in electrical engineering from Pennsylvania State University, December, 1968
