= Sadar + Vuga =

Sadar + Vuga, d.o.o., is a Slovenian architectural bureau that was established in 1996 by the architects Jurij Sadar and Boštjan Vuga. It has become one of the most notable Slovenian architectural bureaus with a number of exhibitions and its works are permanently on display at the Technical University of Munich and MAO Ljubljana. Some of its central works are KSEVT, Stožice Sports Park, and Chamber of Commerce and Industry of Slovenia. Four international monographs have been published, and a documentary film has been produced on Sadar + Vuga.
