= 2022–23 UEFA Europa Conference League qualifying =

Europa Conference League

2022–23 UEFA Europa Conference League qualifying was the preliminary phase of the 2022–23 UEFA Europa Conference League, prior to the competition proper. Qualification consisted of the qualifying phase (first to third rounds) and the play-off round. It began on 5 July and ended on 25 August 2022.

A total of 166 teams competed in the qualifying system, with 25 teams in Champions Path and 141 teams in Main Path. The 22 winners in the play-off round advanced to the group stage, to join the 10 losers of the Europa League play-off round.

Times are CEST (UTC+2), as listed by UEFA (local times, if different, are in parentheses).

== Teams ==
=== Champions Path ===
The Champions Path included league champions which were eliminated from the Champions Path qualifying phase of the Champions League and the Champions Path qualifying phase of the Europa League, and consisted of the following rounds:

- Second qualifying round (16 teams): 16 teams which entered this round (including 13 losers of the Champions League first qualifying round and 3 losers of the Champions League preliminary qualifying round).
- Third qualifying round (10 teams): 8 winners of the second qualifying round and 2 losers of the Champions League first qualifying round which were drawn to receive a bye.
- Play-off round (10 teams): 5 teams which entered this round (including 5 losers of the Europa League Champions Path third qualifying round), and 5 winners of the third qualifying round.

Below are the participating teams of the Champions Path (with their 2022 UEFA club coefficients, not to be used as seeding for the Champions Path, however), grouped by their starting rounds.

Key to colours
Winners of play-off round advance to group stage

Play-off round
Team	Coeff.
(Slovenia) Maribor	14.000
(Slovakia) Slovan Bratislava	13.000
(Luxembourg) F91 Dudelange	8.500
(Northern Ireland) Linfield	7.000
(North Macedonia) Shkupi	4.500

Third qualifying round
Team	Coeff.
(Belarus) Shakhtyor Soligorsk	6.250
(Latvia) RFS	4.000

Second qualifying round
Team	Coeff.
(Romania) CFR Cluj	19.500
(Wales) The New Saints	8.500
(Gibraltar) Lincoln Red Imps	7.250
(Bosnia and Herzegovina) Zrinjski Mostar	7.000
(Montenegro) Sutjeska	6.250
(Faroe Islands) KÍ	6.250
(Poland) Lech Poznań	6.000
(Malta) Hibernians	5.500
(Estonia) FCI Levadia	4.750
(Kazakhstan) Tobol	4.500
(San Marino) La Fiorita	4.000
(Georgia (country)) Dinamo Batumi	3.250
(Andorra) Inter Club d'Escaldes	3.000
(Albania) Tirana	2.750
(Kosovo) Ballkani	1.633
(Iceland) Víkingur Reykjavík	1.075

Notes

1. ^{UEL CH Q3} Losers of Europa League third qualifying round (Champions Path).
2. ^{UCL Q1} Losers of Champions League first qualifying round.
3. ^{UCL PR F} Loser of Champions League preliminary round final.
4. ^{UCL PR SF} Losers of Champions League preliminary round semi-finals.

=== Main Path ===
The Main Path included league non-champions, and consisted of the following rounds:

- First qualifying round (60 teams): 60 teams which entered in this round.
- Second qualifying round (90 teams): 60 teams which entered in this round, and 30 winners of the first qualifying round.
- Third qualifying round (54 teams): nine teams which entered in this round, and 45 winners of the second qualifying round.
- Play-off round (34 teams): seven teams which entered this round (including two losers of the Europa League Main Path third qualifying round), and 27 winners of the third qualifying round.

Below are the participating teams of the League Path (with their 2022 UEFA club coefficients), grouped by their starting rounds.

Key to colours
Winners of play-off round advance to group stage

Play-off round
Team	Coeff.
(Spain) Villarreal	78.000
(Serbia) Partizan	24.500
(England) West Ham United	21.328
(Italy) Fiorentina	15.380
(Germany) 1. FC Köln	15.042
(France) Nice	12.016
(Czech Republic) Slovácko	5.560

Third qualifying round
Team	Coeff.
(Ukraine) Zorya Luhansk	18.000
(Belgium) Anderlecht	11.500
(Austria) Wolfsberger AC	11.000
(Portugal) Gil Vicente	10.676
(Netherlands) Twente	9.860
(Switzerland) Lugano	9.000
(Croatia) Hajduk Split	8.000
(Scotland) Dundee United	7.380
(Greece) Panathinaikos	5.640

Second qualifying round
Team	Coeff.
(Switzerland) Basel	55.000
(Czech Republic) Slavia Prague	52.000
(Switzerland) Young Boys	37.000
(Netherlands) AZ	28.500
(Greece) PAOK	25.000
(Turkey) İstanbul Başakşehir	25.000
(Israel) Maccabi Tel Aviv	24.500
(Kazakhstan) Astana	20.500
(Norway) Molde	19.000
(Cyprus) APOEL	18.000
(Romania) FCSB	17.500
(Belarus) BATE Borisov	17.500
(Austria) Rapid Wien	16.000
(Croatia) Rijeka	15.000
(Belgium) Antwerp	14.500
(Israel) Hapoel Be'er Sheva	14.000
(Czech Republic) Sparta Prague	13.500
(Hungary) MOL Fehérvár	11.500
(Portugal) Vitória de Guimarães	10.676
(Bulgaria) CSKA Sofia	10.500
(Lithuania) Sūduva	10.000
(Denmark) Brøndby	8.500
(Slovakia) Spartak Trnava	8.500
(Kazakhstan) Kairat	8.000
(Croatia) Osijek	8.000
(Romania) Universitatea Craiova	7.500
(Scotland) Motherwell	7.380
(Azerbaijan) Neftçi	7.000
(Serbia) Čukarički	6.675
(Serbia) Radnički Niš	6.675
(Liechtenstein) Vaduz	6.500
(Ukraine) Vorskla Poltava	6.360
(Greece) Aris	5.640
(Norway) Viking	5.450
(Norway) Lillestrøm	5.450
(Denmark) Viborg	5.435
(Turkey) Konyaspor	5.420
(Cyprus) Aris Limassol	5.275
Ararat-Armenia	5.000
(Sweden) AIK	5.000
(Israel) Maccabi Netanya	4.875
(Sweden) Djurgårdens IF	4.575
(Sweden) IF Elfsborg	4.575
(Bulgaria) Botev Plovdiv	3.900
(Bulgaria) Levski Sofia	3.900
(Azerbaijan) Gabala	3.500
(Romania) Sepsi OSK	3.430
(Azerbaijan) Zira	3.400
(Hungary) Puskás Akadémia	3.275
(Hungary) Kisvárda	3.275
(Poland) Raków Częstochowa	3.175
(Kazakhstan) Kyzylzhar	3.150
(Slovenia) Koper	3.000
(Belarus) Gomel	2.500
(Bosnia and Herzegovina) Velež Mostar	2.000
(Latvia) Valmiera	2.000
(Luxembourg) Racing Union	2.000
(Republic of Ireland) St Patrick's Athletic	1.625
(Albania) Vllaznia	1.600
(North Macedonia) Makedonija GP	1.400

First qualifying round
Team	Coeff.
(Estonia) Flora	9.750
(North Macedonia) Shkëndija	9.000
(Latvia) Riga	8.000
(Armenia) Alashkert	8.000
(Slovenia) Olimpija Ljubljana	7.750
(Finland) KuPS	7.500
(Luxembourg) Fola Esch	7.500
(Montenegro) Budućnost Podgorica	7.000
(Georgia (country)) Dinamo Tbilisi	6.500
(Slovakia) DAC Dunajská Streda	6.500
(Albania) Laçi	6.000
(Slovenia) Mura	5.500
(Kosovo) Drita	5.000
(Belarus) Dinamo Minsk	5.000
(Faroe Islands) B36	4.750
(Moldova) Petrocub Hîncești	4.500
(Latvia) Liepāja	4.500
(Gibraltar) Europa	4.500
(Albania) Partizani	4.250
(Iceland) Breiðablik	4.000
(Faroe Islands) HB	4.000
(Malta) Gżira United	4.000
(Moldova) Milsami Orhei	3.750
(Lithuania) Kauno Žalgiris	3.500
(Wales) Bala Town	3.250
(San Marino) Tre Penne	3.250
(Gibraltar) St Joseph's	3.250
(Northern Ireland) Crusaders	3.250
(Poland) Pogoń Szczecin	3.175
(Poland) Lechia Gdańsk	3.175
(Slovakia) Ružomberok	3.125
(Bosnia and Herzegovina) Borac Banja Luka	3.000
(Finland) Inter Turku	3.000
(Iceland) KR	3.000
(San Marino) Tre Fiori	3.000
(Georgia (country)) Saburtalo Tbilisi	3.000
(Moldova) Sfîntul Gheorghe	2.500
(Faroe Islands) Víkingur Gøta	2.500
(Malta) Floriana	2.250
(Republic of Ireland) Derry City	2.250
(Northern Ireland) Larne	2.000
(Lithuania) Panevėžys	2.000
(Estonia) Paide Linnameeskond	2.000
(Northern Ireland) Cliftonville	2.000
(Bosnia and Herzegovina) Tuzla City	1.825
(Finland) SJK	1.775
(Luxembourg) Differdange 03	1.750
(Kosovo) Llapi	1.633
(Kosovo) Gjilani	1.633
(Armenia) Ararat Yerevan	1.625
(Republic of Ireland) Sligo Rovers	1.625
(Georgia (country)) Dila Gori	1.400
(North Macedonia) Akademija Pandev	1.400
(Malta) Hamrun Spartans	1.400
(Wales) Newtown	1.100
(Gibraltar) FCB Magpies	1.083
(Montenegro) Dečić	1.000
(Montenegro) Iskra	1.000
(Andorra) UE Santa Coloma	0.933
(Andorra) Atlètic Club d'Escaldes	0.933

Notes

1. ^{UEL MP Q3} Losers of Europa League third qualifying round (Main Path).

== Format ==
Each tie was played over two legs, with each team playing one leg at home. The team that scored more goals on aggregate over the two legs advanced to the next round. If the aggregate score was level at the end of normal time of the second leg, extra time was played, and if the same number of goals were scored by both teams during extra time, the tie was decided by a penalty shoot-out.

== Schedule ==
The schedule of the competition was as follows (all draws were held at the UEFA headquarters in Nyon, Switzerland).

Schedule for the qualifying phase of the 2022–23 UEFA Europa Conference League
Round	Draw date	First leg	Second leg
First qualifying round	14 June 2022	7 July 2022	14 July 2022
Second qualifying round	15 June 2022	21 July 2022	28 July 2022
Third qualifying round	18 July 2022	4 August 2022	11 August 2022
Play-offs	2 August 2022	18 August 2022	25 August 2022

== First qualifying round ==
The draw for the first qualifying round was held on 14 June 2022.

=== Seeding ===
A total of 60 teams played in the first qualifying round. Seeding of teams was based on their 2022 UEFA club coefficients. Teams from the same association could not be drawn against each other. Prior to the draw, UEFA formed six groups of five seeded teams and five unseeded teams in accordance with the principles set by the Club Competitions Committee. Numbers were pre-assigned for each team by UEFA. The first team drawn in each tie was the home team of the first leg.

Group 1		Group 2		Group 3	
Seeded	Unseeded	Seeded	Unseeded	Seeded	Unseeded
(Armenia) Alashkert (2); (Georgia (country)) Dinamo Tbilisi (1); (Kosovo) Drita (3); (Moldova) Milsami Orhei (5); (Poland) Lechia Gdańsk (4)	(Finland) Inter Turku (6); (Lithuania) Panevėžys (7); (Estonia) Paide Linnameeskond (8); (North Macedonia) Akademija Pandev (9); (Malta) Hamrun Spartans (10)	(Finland) KuPS (1); (Albania) Laçi (2); (Slovenia) Mura (3); (Latvia) Liepāja (4); (Lithuania) Kauno Žalgiris (5)	(Slovakia) Ružomberok (7); (Moldova) Sfîntul Gheorghe (6); (Kosovo) Gjilani (9); (Georgia (country)) Dila Gori (8); (Montenegro) Iskra (10)	(Slovenia) Olimpija Ljubljana (1); (Montenegro) Budućnost Podgorica (2); (Faroe Islands) B36 (3); (Malta) Gżira United (4); (Gibraltar) St Joseph's (5)	(Bosnia and Herzegovina) Borac Banja Luka (6); (Northern Ireland) Larne (7); (Luxembourg) Differdange 03 (8); (Kosovo) Llapi (10); (Andorra) Atlètic Club d'Escaldes (9)
Group 4		Group 5		Group 6	
Seeded	Unseeded	Seeded	Unseeded	Seeded	Unseeded
(Luxembourg) Fola Esch (5); (Slovakia) DAC Dunajská Streda (4); (Gibraltar) Europa (3); (Iceland) Breiðablik (2); (Wales) Bala Town (1)	(San Marino) Tre Fiori (7); (Faroe Islands) Víkingur Gøta (6); (Northern Ireland) Cliftonville (9); (Republic of Ireland) Sligo Rovers (8); (Andorra) UE Santa Coloma (10)	(North Macedonia) Shkëndija (1); (Belarus) Dinamo Minsk (2); (Moldova) Petrocub Hîncești (5); (Albania) Partizani (3); (San Marino) Tre Penne (4)	(Georgia (country)) Saburtalo Tbilisi (6); (Malta) Floriana (7); (Bosnia and Herzegovina) Tuzla City (9); (Armenia) Ararat Yerevan (8); (Montenegro) Dečić (10)	(Estonia) Flora (1); (Latvia) Riga (5); (Faroe Islands) HB (4); (Northern Ireland) Crusaders (3); (Poland) Pogoń Szczecin (2)	(Iceland) KR (10); (Republic of Ireland) Derry City (7); (Finland) SJK (8); (Wales) Newtown (9); (Gibraltar) FCB Magpies (6)

=== Summary ===
The first legs were played on 5, 6 and 7 July, and the second legs were played on 12 and 14 July 2022.

The winners of the ties advanced to the Main Path second qualifying round. The losers were eliminated from European competitions for the season.

Team 1	Agg.	Team 2	1st leg	2nd leg
Alashkert (Armenia)	2–4	(Malta) Hamrun Spartans	1–0	1–4
Lechia Gdańsk (Poland)	6–2	(North Macedonia) Akademija Pandev	4–1	2–1
Inter Turku (Finland)	1–3	(Kosovo) Drita	1–0	0–3
Dinamo Tbilisi (Georgia (country))	4–4 (5–6 p)	(Estonia) Paide Linnameeskond	2–3	2–1 (a.e.t.)
Panevėžys (Lithuania)	0–2	(Moldova) Milsami Orhei	0–0	0–2
Laçi (Albania)	1–0	(Montenegro) Iskra	0–0	1–0
Gjilani (Kosovo)	2–3 (Note: Order of legs reversed after original draw.)	(Latvia) Liepāja	1–0	1–3
Sfîntul Gheorghe (Moldova)	2–4	(Slovenia) Mura	1–2	1–2
KuPS (Finland)	2–0	(Georgia (country)) Dila Gori	2–0	0–0
Ružomberok (Slovakia)	2–0	(Lithuania) Kauno Žalgiris	2–0	0–0
Budućnost Podgorica (Montenegro)	4–2	(Kosovo) Llapi	2–0	2–2
Gżira United (Malta)	2–1	(Andorra) Atlètic Club d'Escaldes	1–1	1–0 (a.e.t.)
Borac Banja Luka (Bosnia and Herzegovina)	3–3 (3–4 p)	(Faroe Islands) B36	2–0	1–3 (a.e.t.)
Olimpija Ljubljana (Slovenia)	3–2	(Luxembourg) Differdange 03	1–1	2–1 (a.e.t.)
St Joseph's (Gibraltar)	1–0	(Northern Ireland) Larne	0–0	1–0
UE Santa Coloma (Andorra)	1–5	(Iceland) Breiðablik	0–1	1–4
DAC Dunajská Streda (Slovakia)	5–1	(Northern Ireland) Cliftonville	2–1	3–0
Víkingur Gøta (Faroe Islands)	3–1	(Gibraltar) Europa	1–0	2–1
Bala Town (Wales)	2–2 (3–4 p)	(Republic of Ireland) Sligo Rovers	1–2	1–0 (a.e.t.)
Fola Esch (Luxembourg)	1–4	(San Marino) Tre Fiori	0–1	1–3
Dinamo Minsk (Belarus)	3–2	(Montenegro) Dečić	1–1	2–1
Tre Penne (San Marino)	0–8	(Bosnia and Herzegovina) Tuzla City	0–2	0–6
Saburtalo Tbilisi (Georgia (country))	1–1 (5–4 p)	(Albania) Partizani	0–1	1–0 (a.e.t.)
Shkëndija (North Macedonia)	4–2	(Armenia) Ararat Yerevan	2–0	2–2
Floriana (Malta)	0–1	(Moldova) Petrocub Hîncești	0–0	0–1
Pogoń Szczecin (Poland)	4–2	(Iceland) KR	4–1	0–1
HB (Faroe Islands)	2–2 (2–4 p)	(Wales) Newtown	1–0	1–2 (a.e.t.)
Bruno's Magpies (Gibraltar)	3–4	(Northern Ireland) Crusaders	2–1	1–3
Flora (Estonia)	3–4	(Finland) SJK	1–0	2–4 (a.e.t.)
Derry City (Republic of Ireland)	0–4	(Latvia) Riga	0–2	0–2

== Second qualifying round ==
The draw for the second qualifying round was held on 15 June 2022.

=== Seeding ===
A total of 106 teams played in the second qualifying round. They were divided into two paths:

- Champions Path (16 teams): The teams, whose identity was not known at the time of draw, was seeded as following:
  - Seeded: 13 of the 15 losers of the 2022–23 UEFA Champions League first qualifying round (two of the teams received a bye to the third qualifying round).
  - Unseeded: 3 losers of the 2022–23 UEFA Champions League preliminary round.
- Main Path (90 teams): 60 teams which entered in this round, and 30 winners of the first qualifying round. Seeding of teams was based on their 2022 UEFA club coefficients. For the winner of the first qualifying round, whose identity was not known at the time of draw, the club coefficient of the highest-ranked remaining team in each tie was used. Teams from the same association could not be drawn against each other.

Prior to the draw, UEFA formed three groups in the Champions Path with two groups of five seeded teams and one unseeded team and one group of three seeded teams and one unseeded team and nine groups in the Main Path of five seeded teams and five unseeded teams, in accordance with the principles set by the Club Competitions Committee. In each group of the Champions Path, firstly, a seeded team was drawn against the only unseeded team, and then, the remaining seeded teams were drawn against each other. In the Main Path, numbers were pre-assigned for each team by UEFA, with the draw held in one run for Groups 1–9 with ten teams. The first team drawn in each tie was the home team of the first leg.

On 27 May 2022, the UEFA executive committee decided to prevent teams from Belarus and Ukraine from being drawn against each other in any future UEFA competitions with immediate effect and until further notice due to the Belarusian involvement in the Russian invasion of Ukraine.

Champions Path
Group 1		Group 2		Group 3	
Seeded	Unseeded	Seeded	Unseeded	Seeded	Unseeded
(Iceland) Víkingur Reykjavík; (Montenegro) Sutjeska; (Faroe Islands) KÍ; (Wales) The New Saints; (Kosovo) Ballkani	(San Marino) La Fiorita	(Poland) Lech Poznań; (Bosnia and Herzegovina) Zrinjski Mostar; (Georgia (country)) Dinamo Batumi; (Albania) Tirana; (Malta) Hibernians	(Estonia) FCI Levadia	(Romania) CFR Cluj; (Kazakhstan) Tobol; (Gibraltar) Lincoln Red Imps	(Andorra) Inter Club d'Escaldes

Main Path
Group 1		Group 2		Group 3	
Seeded	Unseeded	Seeded	Unseeded	Seeded	Unseeded
(Turkey) İstanbul Başakşehir (2); (Cyprus) APOEL (1); (Hungary) MOL Fehérvár (3); (Serbia) Radnički Niš (5); (Greece) Aris (4)	(Israel) Maccabi Netanya (6); (Malta) Gżira United (7); (Bulgaria) Botev Plovdiv (8); (Azerbaijan) Gabala (9); (Belarus) Gomel (10)	(Romania) FCSB (1); (Israel) Hapoel Be'er Sheva (2); (Bulgaria) CSKA Sofia (3); (Malta) Hamrun Spartans (4); (Azerbaijan) Neftçi (5)	(Cyprus) Aris Limassol (7); (Belarus) Dinamo Minsk (6); (Georgia (country)) Saburtalo Tbilisi (8); (Bosnia and Herzegovina) Velež Mostar (10); (North Macedonia) Makedonija GP (9)	(Israel) Maccabi Tel Aviv (5); (Belarus) BATE Borisov (2); (Kazakhstan) Kairat (3); (Romania) Universitatea Craiova (4); (Estonia) Paide Linnameeskond (1)	(Turkey) Konyaspor (6); Ararat-Armenia (8); (Azerbaijan) Zira (7); (Hungary) Kisvárda (9); (Albania) Vllaznia (10)
Group 4		Group 5		Group 6	
Seeded	Unseeded	Seeded	Unseeded	Seeded	Unseeded
(Switzerland) Young Boys (1); (Austria) Rapid Wien (3); (Finland) SJK (2); (Croatia) Osijek (4); (Slovenia) Olimpija Ljubljana (5)	(Norway) Lillestrøm (6); (Latvia) Liepāja (8); (Romania) Sepsi OSK (7); (Poland) Lechia Gdańsk(9); (Kazakhstan) Kyzylzhar (10)	(Czech Republic) Slavia Prague (1); (Lithuania) Sūduva (2); (Slovakia) Spartak Trnava (3); (Montenegro) Budućnost Podgorica (5); (Slovenia) Mura (4)	(Denmark) Viborg (6); (Iceland) Breiðablik (7); (Wales) Newtown (9); (Gibraltar) St Joseph's (8); (Republic of Ireland) St Patrick's Athletic (10)	(Netherlands) AZ (1); (Norway) Molde (2); (Denmark) Brøndby (4); (Scotland) Motherwell (3); (Slovakia) DAC Dunajská Streda (5)	(Sweden) IF Elfsborg (6); (Faroe Islands) Víkingur Gøta (7); (Republic of Ireland) Sligo Rovers (9); (Bosnia and Herzegovina) Tuzla City (8); (Poland) Pogoń Szczecin (10)
Group 7		Group 8		Group 9	
Seeded	Unseeded	Seeded	Unseeded	Seeded	Unseeded
(Switzerland) Basel (3); (Belgium) Antwerp (2); (Latvia) Riga (1); (San Marino) Tre Fiori (4); (Liechtenstein) Vaduz (5)	(Kosovo) Drita (6); (Faroe Islands) B36 (10); (Slovakia) Ružomberok (8); (Northern Ireland) Crusaders (9); (Slovenia) Koper (7)	(Greece) PAOK (1); (Croatia) Rijeka (2); (Portugal) Vitória de Guimarães (3); (Serbia) Čukarički (4); (Albania) Laçi (5)	(Sweden) Djurgårdens IF (6); (Moldova) Petrocub Hîncești (7); (Bulgaria) Levski Sofia (8); (Hungary) Puskás Akadémia (9); (Luxembourg) Racing Union (10)	(Kazakhstan) Astana (1); (Czech Republic) Sparta Prague (2); (North Macedonia) Shkëndija (4); (Finland) KuPS (3); (Ukraine) Vorskla Poltava (5)	(Norway) Viking (6); (Sweden) AIK (7); (Moldova) Milsami Orhei (9); (Poland) Raków Częstochowa (8); (Latvia) Valmiera (10)

1. ^{†} Winner of the first qualifying round, whose identity was not known at the time of draw. Teams in italics defeated a team with a higher coefficient, thus effectively taking the coefficient of their opponent in the draw.

=== Summary ===
The first legs were played on 19, 20 and 21 July, and the second legs were played on 26, 27 and 28 July 2022.

The winners of the ties advanced to the third qualifying round of their respective path. The losers were eliminated from European competitions for the season.

Team 1	Agg.	Team 2	1st leg	2nd leg
Champions Path
Shakhtyor Soligorsk (Belarus)	Bye	N/A	—	—
RFS (Latvia)	Bye	N/A	—	—
La Fiorita (San Marino)	0–10	(Kosovo) Ballkani	0–4	0–6
Víkingur Reykjavík (Iceland)	2–0	(Wales) The New Saints	2–0	0–0
Sutjeska (Montenegro)	0–1	(Faroe Islands) KÍ	0–0	0–1
Hibernians (Malta)	4–3	(Estonia) FCI Levadia	3–2	1–1
Tirana (Albania)	2–4	(Bosnia and Herzegovina) Zrinjski Mostar	0–1	2–3
Lech Poznań (Poland)	6–1	(Georgia (country)) Dinamo Batumi	5–0	1–1
CFR Cluj (Romania)	4–1	(Andorra) Inter Club d'Escaldes	3–0	1–1
Tobol (Kazakhstan)	3–0	(Gibraltar) Lincoln Red Imps	2–0	1–0
Main Path
Gżira United (Malta)	5–5 (3–1 p)	(Serbia) Radnički Niš	2–2	3–3 (a.e.t.)
Aris (Greece)	7–2 (Note: Order of legs reversed after original draw.)	(Belarus) Gomel	5–1	2–1
Botev Plovdiv (Bulgaria)	0–2	(Cyprus) APOEL	0–0	0–2
MOL Fehérvár (Hungary)	5–3	(Azerbaijan) Gabala	4–1	1–2
İstanbul Başakşehir (Turkey)	2–1	(Israel) Maccabi Netanya	1–1	1–0
Aris Limassol (Cyprus)	2–3	(Azerbaijan) Neftçi	2–0	0–3
Velež Mostar (Bosnia and Herzegovina)	0–2	(Malta) Hamrun Spartans	0–1	0–1
Saburtalo Tbilisi (Georgia (country))	3–4	(Romania) FCSB	1–0	2–4
Makedonija G.P. (North Macedonia)	0–4	(Bulgaria) CSKA Sofia	0–0	0–4
Hapoel Be'er Sheva (Israel)	3–1	(Belarus) Dinamo Minsk	2–1	1–0
Zira (Azerbaijan)	0–3	(Israel) Maccabi Tel Aviv	0–3	0–0
Vllaznia (Albania)	1–4	(Romania) Universitatea Craiova	1–1	0–3
Ararat-Armenia	0–0 (3–5 p)	(Estonia) Paide Linnameeskond	0–0	0–0 (a.e.t.)
Kairat (Kazakhstan)	0–2	(Hungary) Kisvárda	0–1	0–1
BATE Borisov (Belarus)	0–5	(Turkey) Konyaspor	0–3	0–2
Sepsi OSK (Romania)	3–3 (4–2 p)	(Slovenia) Olimpija Ljubljana	3–1	0–2 (a.e.t.)
Kyzylzhar (Kazakhstan)	3–2	(Croatia) Osijek	1–2	2–0
Liepāja (Latvia)	0–4	(Switzerland) Young Boys	0–1	0–3
Rapid Wien (Austria)	2–1	(Poland) Lechia Gdańsk	0–0	2–1
SJK (Finland)	2–6	(Norway) Lillestrøm	0–1	2–5
Breiðablik (Iceland)	3–2	(Montenegro) Budućnost Podgorica	2–0	1–2
St Patrick's Athletic (Republic of Ireland)	1–1 (6–5 p)	(Slovenia) Mura	1–1	0–0 (a.e.t.)
St Joseph's (Gibraltar)	0–11	(Czech Republic) Slavia Prague	0–4	0–7
Spartak Trnava (Slovakia)	6–2	(Wales) Newtown	4–1	2–1
Sūduva (Lithuania)	0–2	(Denmark) Viborg	0–1	0–1
Víkingur Gøta (Faroe Islands)	0–4	(Slovakia) DAC Dunajská Streda	0–2	0–2
Pogoń Szczecin (Poland)	1–5	(Denmark) Brøndby	1–1	0–4
AZ (Netherlands)	5–0	(Bosnia and Herzegovina) Tuzla City	1–0	4–0
Motherwell (Scotland)	0–3	(Republic of Ireland) Sligo Rovers	0–1	0–2
Molde (Norway)	6–2	(Sweden) IF Elfsborg	4–1	2–1
Koper (Slovenia)	1–2	(Liechtenstein) Vaduz	0–1	1–1 (a.e.t.)
B36 (Faroe Islands)	1–0	(San Marino) Tre Fiori	1–0	0–0
Ružomberok (Slovakia)	1–5	(Latvia) Riga	0–3	1–2
Basel (Switzerland)	3–1	(Northern Ireland) Crusaders	2–0	1–1
Antwerp (Belgium)	2–0	(Kosovo) Drita	0–0	2–0
Petrocub Hîncești (Moldova)	4–1	(Albania) Laçi	0–0	4–1
Racing Union (Luxembourg)	1–8	(Serbia) Čukarički	1–4	0–4
Levski Sofia (Bulgaria)	3–1	(Greece) PAOK	2–0	1–1
Vitória de Guimarães (Portugal)	3–0	(Hungary) Puskás Akadémia	3–0	0–0
Rijeka (Croatia)	1–4	(Sweden) Djurgårdens IF	1–2	0–2
Vorskla Poltava (Ukraine)	3–4	(Sweden) AIK	3–2	0–2 (a.e.t.)
Valmiera (Latvia)	2–5	(North Macedonia) Shkëndija	1–2	1–3
Raków Częstochowa (Poland)	6–0	(Kazakhstan) Astana	5–0	1–0
KuPS (Finland)	6–3	(Moldova) Milsami Orhei	2–2	4–1
Sparta Prague (Czech Republic)	1–2	(Norway) Viking	0–0	1–2

== Third qualifying round ==
The draw for the third qualifying round was held on 18 July 2022.

=== Seeding ===
A total of 64 teams played in the third qualifying round. They were divided into two paths:

- Champions Path (10 teams): eight winners of the second qualifying round (Champions Path), whose identity was not known at the time of the draw, and two losers from the first qualifying round of the Champions League which received a bye to this round. There was no seeding.
- Main Path (54 teams): nine teams that entered in this round, and 45 winners of the second qualifying round (Main Path). Seeding of teams was based on their 2022 UEFA club coefficients. For the winners of the second qualifying round, whose identity was not known at the time of draw, the club coefficient of the highest-ranked remaining team in each tie was used. Teams from the same association could not be drawn against each other.

Prior to the draw, UEFA formed two groups in the Champions Path with one group of six teams and one group of four teams and six groups in the Main Path with three groups of four seeded teams and four unseeded teams, and with three groups of five seeded teams and five unseeded teams. in accordance with the principles set by the Club Competitions Committee. In each group of the Champions Path, the teams were drawn into ties without seeding. The first ball drawn designated the home team for the first leg. In the Main Path, numbers were pre-assigned for each team by UEFA, with the draw held in one run for Groups 1–3 with eight teams, and in one run for Groups 4–6 with ten teams. The first team drawn in each tie was the home team of the first leg.

Champions Path
Group 1	Group 2
(Latvia) RFS; (Kosovo) Ballkani; (Iceland) Víkingur Reykjavík; (Faroe Islands) KÍ; (Malta) Hibernians; (Poland) Lech Poznań	(Belarus) Shakhtyor Soligorsk; (Bosnia and Herzegovina) Zrinjski Mostar; (Romania) CFR Cluj; (Kazakhstan) Tobol

Main Path
Group 1		Group 2		Group 3	
Seeded	Unseeded	Seeded	Unseeded	Seeded	Unseeded
(Turkey) İstanbul Başakşehir (2); (Poland) Raków Częstochowa (1); (Norway) Viking (4); (North Macedonia) Shkëndija (3)	(Slovakia) Spartak Trnava (5); (Republic of Ireland) Sligo Rovers (7); (Iceland) Breiðablik (6); (Sweden) AIK (8)	(Switzerland) Young Boys (1); (Belgium) Anderlecht (3); (Portugal) Vitória de Guimarães (2); (Denmark) Viborg (4)	(Croatia) Hajduk Split (6); (Finland) KuPS (5); (Estonia) Paide Linnameeskond (8); (Faroe Islands) B36 (7)	(Switzerland) Basel (1); (Netherlands) AZ (2); (Belgium) Antwerp (3); (Bulgaria) CSKA Sofia (4)	(Denmark) Brøndby (5); (Scotland) Dundee United (6); (Republic of Ireland) St Patrick's Athletic (7); (Norway) Lillestrøm (8)
Group 4		Group 5		Group 6	
Seeded	Unseeded	Seeded	Unseeded	Seeded	Unseeded
(Israel) Maccabi Tel Aviv (1); (Cyprus) APOEL (2); (Romania) FCSB (3); (Austria) Wolfsberger AC (5); (Portugal) Gil Vicente (4)	(Latvia) Riga (6); (Kazakhstan) Kyzylzhar (7); (Malta) Gżira United (9); (Slovakia) DAC Dunajská Streda (8); (Greece) Aris (10)	(Bulgaria) Levski Sofia (5); (Norway) Molde (2); (Austria) Rapid Wien (3); (Israel) Hapoel Be'er Sheva (4); (Netherlands) Twente (1)	(Switzerland) Lugano (6); (Hungary) Kisvárda (7); (Azerbaijan) Neftçi (8); (Serbia) Čukarički (10); (Malta) Hamrun Spartans (9)	(Czech Republic) Slavia Prague (1); (Ukraine) Zorya Luhansk (2); (Turkey) Konyaspor (3); (Sweden) Djurgårdens IF (4); (Hungary) MOL Fehérvár (5)	(Romania) Sepsi OSK (6); (Romania) Universitatea Craiova (7); (Liechtenstein) Vaduz (8); (Moldova) Petrocub Hîncești (9); (Greece) Panathinaikos (10)

Notes

1. ^{†} Winner of the main path second qualifying round, whose identity was not known at the time of draw. Teams in italics defeated a team with a higher coefficient, thus effectively taking the coefficient of their opponent in the draw.
2. ^{††} Winner of the champions path second qualifying round, whose identity was not known at the time of draw.

=== Summary ===
The first legs were played on 3 and 4 August, and the second legs were played on 9, 10 and 11 August 2022.

The winners of the ties advanced to the play-off round of their respective path. The losers were eliminated from European competitions for the season.

Team 1	Agg.	Team 2	1st leg	2nd leg
Champions Path
Víkingur Reykjavík (Iceland)	2–4	(Poland) Lech Poznań	1–0	1–4 (a.e.t.)
RFS (Latvia)	4–2	(Malta) Hibernians	1–1	3–1
Ballkani (Kosovo)	4–4 (4–3 p)	(Faroe Islands) KÍ	3–2	1–2 (a.e.t.)
Zrinjski Mostar (Bosnia and Herzegovina)	2–1	(Kazakhstan) Tobol	1–0	1–1
Shakhtyor Soligorsk (Belarus)	0–1	(Romania) CFR Cluj	0–0	0–1
Main Path
Spartak Trnava (Slovakia)	0–3	(Poland) Raków Częstochowa	0–2	0–1
AIK (Sweden)	2–2 (3–2 p)	(North Macedonia) Shkëndija	1–1	1–1 (a.e.t.)
Viking (Norway)	5–2	(Republic of Ireland) Sligo Rovers	5–1	0–1
Breiðablik (Iceland)	1–6	(Turkey) İstanbul Başakşehir	1–3	0–3
KuPS (Finland)	0–5	(Switzerland) Young Boys	0–2	0–3
Paide Linnameeskond (Estonia)	0–5	(Belgium) Anderlecht	0–2	0–3
Viborg (Denmark)	5–1	(Faroe Islands) B36	3–0	2–1
Hajduk Split (Croatia)	3–2	(Portugal) Vitória de Guimarães	3–1	0–1
Brøndby (Denmark)	2–2 (1–3 p)	(Switzerland) Basel	1–0	1–2 (a.e.t.)
Lillestrøm (Norway)	1–5	(Belgium) Antwerp	1–3	0–2
CSKA Sofia (Bulgaria)	2–1	(Republic of Ireland) St Patrick's Athletic	0–1	2–0
Dundee United (Scotland)	1–7	(Netherlands) AZ	1–0	0–7
APOEL (Cyprus)	1–0	(Kazakhstan) Kyzylzhar	1–0	0–0
DAC Dunajská Streda (Slovakia)	0–2	(Romania) FCSB	0–1	0–1
Riga (Latvia)	1–5	(Portugal) Gil Vicente	1–1	0–4
Wolfsberger AC (Austria)	4–0	(Malta) Gżira United	0–0	4–0
Maccabi Tel Aviv (Israel)	3–2	(Greece) Aris	2–0	1–2
Molde (Norway)	4–2	(Hungary) Kisvárda	3–0	1–2
Neftçi (Azerbaijan)	2–3	(Austria) Rapid Wien	2–1	0–2 (a.e.t.)
Lugano (Switzerland)	1–5	(Israel) Hapoel Be'er Sheva	0–2	1–3
Hamrun Spartans (Malta)	2–2 (4–1 p) (Note: Order of legs reversed after original draw.)	(Bulgaria) Levski Sofia	0–1	2–1 (a.e.t.)
Čukarički (Serbia)	2–7	(Netherlands) Twente	1–3	1–4
Zorya Luhansk (Ukraine)	1–3	(Romania) Universitatea Craiova	1–0	0–3
Vaduz (Liechtenstein)	5–3	(Turkey) Konyaspor	1–1	4–2
Sepsi OSK (Romania)	2–6	(Sweden) Djurgårdens IF	1–3	1–3
MOL Fehérvár (Hungary)	7–1	(Moldova) Petrocub Hîncești	5–0	2–1
Slavia Prague (Czech Republic)	3–1	(Greece) Panathinaikos	2–0	1–1

== Play-off round ==
The draw for the play-off round was held on 2 August 2022.

=== Seeding ===
A total of 44 teams played in the play-off round. They were divided into two paths:

- Champions Path (10 teams): The teams, whose identity was not known at the time of the draw, were seeded as follows:
  - Seeded: five losers of the 2022–23 UEFA Europa League third qualifying round (Champions Path).
  - Unseeded: five winners of the third qualifying round (Champions Path).
- Main Path (34 teams): five teams which entered in this round, 27 winners of the third qualifying round (Main Path), and two losers of the 2022–23 UEFA Europa League third qualifying round (Main Path). Seeding of teams was based on their 2022 UEFA club coefficients. For the winners of the third qualifying round and losers of the Europa League third qualifying round, whose identity was not known at the time of draw, the club coefficient of the highest-ranked remaining team in each tie was used. Teams from the same association could not be drawn against each other.

Prior to the draw, UEFA formed four groups in the Main Path, three of four seeded teams and four unseeded teams, and one of five seeded teams and five unseeded teams, in accordance with the principles set by the Club Competitions Committee. In the Main Path, numbers were pre-assigned for each team by UEFA, with the draw held in two runs, one for Groups 1–3 with eight teams and one for Group 4 with ten teams. The first team drawn in each tie was the home team of the first leg.

Champions Path
Seeded	Unseeded
(Luxembourg) F91 Dudelange; (North Macedonia) Shkupi; (Northern Ireland) Linfield; (Slovakia) Slovan Bratislava; (Slovenia) Maribor	(Poland) Lech Poznań; (Latvia) RFS; (Kosovo) Ballkani; (Bosnia and Herzegovina) Zrinjski Mostar; (Romania) CFR Cluj

Main Path
Group 1		Group 2	
Seeded	Unseeded	Seeded	Unseeded
(Switzerland) Basel (1); (Turkey) İstanbul Başakşehir (2); (Cyprus) APOEL (3); (Italy) Fiorentina (4)	(Belgium) Antwerp (8); (Bulgaria) CSKA Sofia (7); (Netherlands) Twente (6); (Sweden) Djurgårdens IF (5)	(Spain) Villarreal (4); (Israel) Maccabi Tel Aviv (3); (Romania) FCSB (2); (Austria) Rapid Wien (1)	(France) Nice (5); (Croatia) Hajduk Split (6); (Liechtenstein) Vaduz (7); (Norway) Viking (8)
Group 3		Group 4	
Seeded	Unseeded	Seeded	Unseeded
(Czech Republic) Slavia Prague (1); (Serbia) Partizan (2); (Romania) Universitatea Craiova (3); (Germany) 1. FC Köln (4)	(Israel) Hapoel Be'er Sheva (5); (Hungary) MOL Fehérvár (6); (Poland) Raków Częstochowa (7); (Malta) Hamrun Spartans (8)	(Switzerland) Young Boys (1); (Netherlands) AZ (2); (England) West Ham United (3); (Norway) Molde (4); (Czech Republic) Slovácko (5)	(Belgium) Anderlecht (6); (Austria) Wolfsberger AC (7); (Portugal) Gil Vicente (8); (Sweden) AIK (9); (Denmark) Viborg (10)

Notes

1. ^{†} Winner of the third qualifying round, whose identity was not known at the time of draw. Teams in italics defeated a team with a higher coefficient, thus effectively taking the coefficient of their opponent in the draw.
2. ^{††} Loser of the UEFA Europa League third qualifying round, whose identity was not known at the time of draw. Teams in italics lost against a team with a higher coefficient, thus effectively taking the coefficient of their opponent in the draw.

=== Summary ===
The first legs were played on 17 and 18 August, and the second legs were played on 23 and 25 August 2022.

The winners of the ties advanced to the group stage. The losers were eliminated from European competitions for the season.

Team 1	Agg.	Team 2	1st leg	2nd leg
Champions Path
Maribor (Slovenia)	0–1	(Romania) CFR Cluj	0–0	0–1
RFS (Latvia)	3–3 (4–2 p)	(Northern Ireland) Linfield	2–2	1–1 (a.e.t.)
Lech Poznań (Poland)	3–1	(Luxembourg) F91 Dudelange	2–0	1–1
Shkupi (North Macedonia)	1–3	(Kosovo) Ballkani	1–2	0–1
Zrinjski Mostar (Bosnia and Herzegovina)	2–2 (5–6 p)	(Slovakia) Slovan Bratislava	1–0	1–2 (a.e.t.)
Main Path
CSKA Sofia (Bulgaria)	1–2	(Switzerland) Basel	1–0	0–2
Vaduz (Liechtenstein)	2–1	(Austria) Rapid Wien	1–1	1–0
Raków Częstochowa (Poland)	2–3	(Czech Republic) Slavia Prague	2–1	0–2 (a.e.t.)
Djurgårdens IF (Sweden)	5–3 (Note: Order of legs reversed after original draw.)	(Cyprus) APOEL	3–0	2–3
Maccabi Tel Aviv (Israel)	1–2	(France) Nice	1–0	0–2 (a.e.t.)
Universitatea Craiova (Romania)	2–2 (3–4 p)	(Israel) Hapoel Be'er Sheva	1–1	1–1 (a.e.t.)
İstanbul Başakşehir (Turkey)	4–2	(Belgium) Antwerp	1–1	3–1
FCSB (Romania)	4–3	(Norway) Viking	1–2	3–1
Partizan (Serbia)	7–4	(Malta) Hamrun Spartans	4–1	3–3
Fiorentina (Italy)	2–1	(Netherlands) Twente	2–1	0–0
Villarreal (Spain)	6–2	(Croatia) Hajduk Split	4–2	2–0
1. FC Köln (Germany)	4–2	(Hungary) MOL Fehérvár	1–2	3–0
West Ham United (England)	6–1	(Denmark) Viborg	3–1	3–0
Young Boys (Switzerland)	1–1 (1–3 p)	(Belgium) Anderlecht	0–1	1–0 (a.e.t.)
Slovácko (Czech Republic)	4–0	(Sweden) AIK	3–0	1–0
Molde (Norway)	4–1	(Austria) Wolfsberger AC	0–1	4–0
AZ (Netherlands)	6–1	(Portugal) Gil Vicente	4–0	2–1
