= 2022–23 UEFA Europa Conference League =

European football tournament

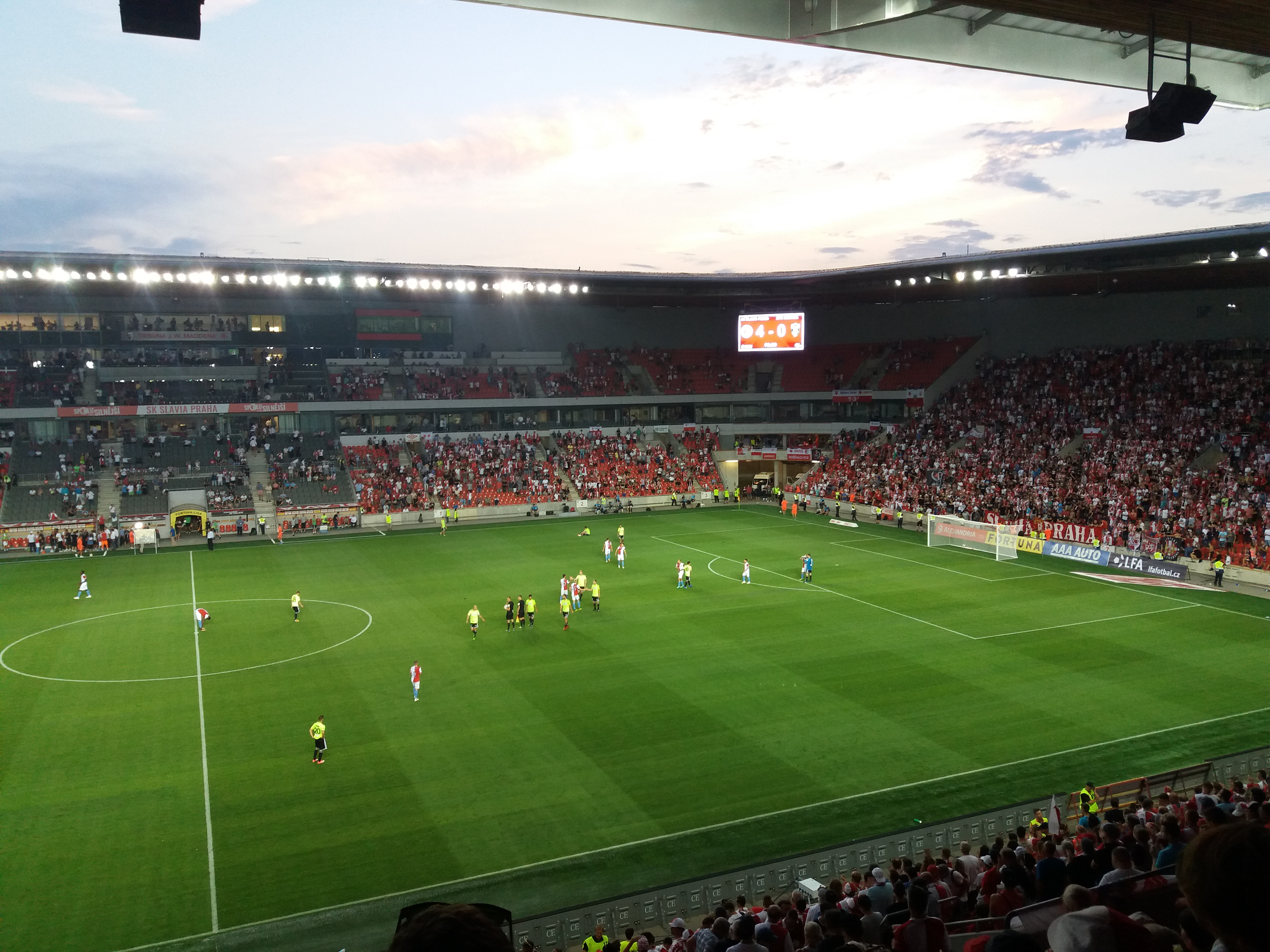
- The Fortuna Arena in Prague hosted the final

Tournament details
- Dates: Qualifying: 5 July – 25 August 2022; Competition proper: 8 September 2022 – 7 June 2023
- Teams: Competition proper: 32+8; Total: 134+43 (from 54 associations)

Final positions
- Champions: (England) West Ham United (1st title)
- Runners-up: (Italy) Fiorentina

Tournament statistics
- Matches played: 141
- Goals scored: 379 (2.69 per match)
- Attendance: 2,077,952 (14,737 per match)
- Top scorer(s): (Switzerland) Zeki Amdouni (Basel) (Brazil) Arthur Cabral (Fiorentina); 7 goals each
- Best player: (England) Declan Rice (West Ham United)
- Best young player: (France) Andy Diouf (Basel)

The 2022–23 UEFA Europa Conference League was the second season of the UEFA Europa Conference League, Europe's tertiary club football tournament organised by UEFA.

The final was played at Fortuna Arena in Prague, Czech Republic. It was won by West Ham United, who defeated Fiorentina 2–1, and qualified for the 2023–24 UEFA Europa League group stage as a result.

As the title holders, Roma qualified for the 2022–23 UEFA Europa League. They were unable to defend their title after advancing to the Europa League knockout phase.

== Association team allocation ==
A total of 177 teams from 54 of the 55 UEFA member associations (excluding Russia) participated in the 2022–23 UEFA Europa Conference League. The association ranking based on the UEFA country coefficients was used to determine the number of participating teams for each association:

- Associations 1–5 each had one team qualify.
- Associations 6–17 (except Russia) and 51–55 each had two teams qualify.
- Associations 18–50 (except Liechtenstein) each had three teams qualify.
- Liechtenstein had one team qualify as they organized only a domestic cup and no domestic league.
- Moreover, 18 teams eliminated from the 2022–23 UEFA Champions League and 25 teams eliminated from the 2022–23 UEFA Europa League were transferred to the Europa Conference League.

=== Association ranking ===
For the 2022–23 UEFA Europa Conference League, the associations were allocated places according to their 2021 UEFA country coefficients, which took into account their performance in European competitions from 2016–17 to 2020–21.

Apart from the allocation based on the country coefficients, associations could have additional teams participating in the Europa Conference League, as noted below:

- (UCL) – Additional teams transferred from the UEFA Champions League
- (UEL) – Additional teams transferred from the UEFA Europa League

Association ranking for 2022–23 UEFA Europa Conference League

Rank	Association	Coeff.	Teams	Notes
1	England	100.569	1	
2	Spain	97.855	1	
3	Italy	75.438	1	+1 (UEL)
4	Germany	73.570	1	
5	France	56.081	1	
6	Portugal	48.549	2	+1 (UEL)
7	Netherlands	39.200	2	
8	Russia	38.382	0	
9	Belgium	36.500	2	+1 (UEL)
10	Austria	35.825	2	+1 (UEL)
11	Scotland	33.375	2	+1 (UEL)
12	Ukraine	33.100	2	+1 (UEL)
13	Turkey	30.100	2	+2 (UEL)
14	Denmark	27.875	2	+1 (UEL)
15	Cyprus	27.750	2	+2 (UEL)
16	Serbia	26.750	2	+1 (UEL)
17	Czech Republic	26.600	2	+1 (UEL)
18	Croatia	26.275	3	
19	Switzerland	26.225	3	

Rank	Association	Coeff.	Teams	Notes
20	Greece	26.000	3	
21	Israel	24.375	3	
22	Norway	21.000	3	+1 (UEL)
23	Sweden	20.500	3	
24	Bulgaria	20.375	3	+1 (UEL)
25	Romania	18.200	3	+1 (UCL)
26	Azerbaijan	16.875	3	+1 (UEL)
27	Kazakhstan	15.625	3	+1 (UCL)
28	Hungary	15.500	3	
29	Belarus	15.250	3	+1 (UCL)
30	Poland	15.125	3	+1 (UCL)
31	Slovenia	14.250	3	+1 (UEL)
32	Slovakia	13.625	3	+1 (UEL)
33	Liechtenstein	9.000	1	
34	Lithuania	8.750	3	+1 (UEL)
35	Luxembourg	8.250	3	+1 (UEL)
36	Bosnia and Herzegovina	8.000	3	+1 (UCL)
37	Republic of Ireland	7.875	3	+1 (UEL)

Rank	Association	Coeff.	Teams	Notes
38	North Macedonia	7.625	3	+1 (UEL)
39	Armenia	7.375	3	+1 (UEL)
40	Latvia	7.375	3	+1 (UCL)
41	Albania	7.250	3	+1 (UCL)
42	Northern Ireland	6.958	3	+1 (UEL)
43	Georgia	6.875	3	+1 (UCL)
44	Finland	6.875	3	
45	Moldova	6.875	3	+1 (UEL)
46	Malta	6.375	3	+1 (UCL)
47	Faroe Islands	6.125	3	+1 (UCL)
48	Kosovo	5.833	3	+1 (UCL)
49	Gibraltar	5.666	3	+1 (UCL)
50	Montenegro	5.000	3	+1 (UCL)
51	Wales	5.000	2	+1 (UCL)
52	Iceland	4.875	2	+1 (UCL)
53	Estonia	4.750	2	+1 (UCL)
54	Andorra	3.331	2	+1 (UCL)
55	San Marino	1.166	2	+1 (UCL)

=== Distribution ===
The following was the access list for this season. In the default access list, the title holders of the Europa Conference League qualified for the Europa League group stage.

Due to the suspension of Russia for the 2022–23 European season, the following changes to the access list were made:

- The cup winners of association 16 (Serbia) enter the Europa League third qualifying round instead of the second qualifying round.
- The cup winners of associations 18 (Croatia) and 19 (Switzerland) enter the third qualifying round instead of the second qualifying round.
- The cup winners of associations 30 to 39 (Poland, Slovenia, Slovakia, Liechtenstein, Lithuania, Luxembourg, Bosnia and Herzegovina, Republic of Ireland, North Macedonia and Armenia) enter the second qualifying round instead of the first qualifying round.

Since several changes were made in the Europa League access list following the qualification of the Europa Conference League title holders to the Europa League group stage, the following changes to the access list were made:

- The cup winners of association 17 (Czech Republic) enter the Europa League third qualifying round instead of the second qualifying round.
- The cup winners of association 20 (Greece) enter the third qualifying round instead of the second qualifying round.
- The cup winners of associations 40 (Latvia) and 41 (Albania) enter the second qualifying round instead of the first qualifying round.

Moreover, in the default access list, originally 16 losers from the Champions League first qualifying round were transferred to the Europa Conference League second qualifying round (Champions Path). However, since the Champions League title holders, Real Madrid, which were guaranteed a berth in the Champions League group stage, already qualified via their domestic league, only 15 losers from the Champions League first qualifying round were transferred to the Europa Conference League second qualifying round (Champions Path) after the Champions League access list was rebalanced. As a result, only 16 teams entered the Champions Path second qualifying round (two of the losers from the Champions League first qualifying round were drawn to receive byes to the third qualifying round).

Access list for 2022–23 UEFA Europa Conference League
		Teams entering in this round	Teams advancing from previous round	Teams transferred from Champions League or Europa League
First qualifying round (60 teams)		14 domestic cup winners from associations 42–55; 25 domestic league runners-up from associations 30–55 (except Liechtenstein); 21 domestic league third-placed teams from associations 29–50 (except Liechtenstein)		
Second qualifying round (106 teams)	Champions Path (16 teams)			3 teams eliminated from Champions League preliminary round; 13 teams eliminated from Champions League first qualifying round
Second qualifying round (106 teams)	Main Path (90 teams)	21 domestic cup winners from associations 21–41; 14 domestic league runners-up from associations 16–29; 16 domestic league third-placed teams from associations 13–28; 8 domestic league fourth-placed teams from associations 7–15 (except Russia); 1 domestic league fifth-placed team from association 6	30 winners from the first qualifying round	
Third qualifying round (64 teams)	Champions Path (10 teams)		8 winners from the second qualifying round (Champions Path)	2 teams eliminated from Champions League first qualifying round
Third qualifying round (64 teams)	Main Path (54 teams)	3 domestic cup winners from associations 18–20; 5 domestic league third-placed teams from associations 7–12 (except Russia); 1 domestic league fourth-placed team from association 6	45 winners from the second qualifying round (Main Path)	
Play-off round (44 teams)	Champions Path (10 teams)		5 winners from the third qualifying round (Champions Path)	5 teams eliminated from Europa League third qualifying round (Champions Path)
Play-off round (44 teams)	Main Path (34 teams)	1 domestic league fifth-placed team from association 5; 4 domestic league sixth-placed teams from associations 1–4 (EFL Cup winners for England)	27 winners from the third qualifying round (Main Path)	2 teams eliminated from Europa League third qualifying round (Main Path)
Group stage (32 teams)			5 winners from the play-off round (Champions Path); 17 winners from the play-off round (Main Path)	10 teams eliminated from Europa League play-off round
Preliminary knockout round (16 teams)			8 group runners-up from the group stage	8 group third-placed teams from Europa League group stage
Knockout phase (16 teams)			8 group winners from the group stage; 8 winners from the preliminary knockout round	

=== Teams ===
The labels in the parentheses show how each team qualified for the place of its starting round:

- CW: Domestic cup winners
- 2nd, 3rd, 4th, 5th, 6th, etc.: League position of the previous season
- Abd-: League positions of abandoned season as determined by the national association; all teams were subject to approval by UEFA
- LC: League cup winners
- RW: Regular season winners
- PW: End-of-season Europa Conference League play-offs winners
- UCL: Transferred from the Champions League
  - Q1: Losers from the first qualifying round
  - PR: Losers from the preliminary round (F: final; SF: semi-finals)
- UEL: Transferred from the Europa League
  - GS: Third-placed teams from the group stage
  - PO: Losers from the play-off round
  - CH/MP Q3: Losers from the third qualifying round (Champions/Main Path)

The second qualifying round, third qualifying round and play-off round were divided into Champions Path (CH) and Main Path (MP).

Qualified teams for 2022–23 UEFA Europa Conference League
Entry round		Teams			
Knockout round play-offs		(Norway) Bodø/Glimt (UEL GS)	(Cyprus) AEK Larnaca (UEL GS)	(Bulgaria) Ludogorets Razgrad (UEL GS)	(Portugal) Braga (UEL GS)
Knockout round play-offs		(Moldova) Sheriff Tiraspol (UEL GS)	(Italy) Lazio (UEL GS)	(Azerbaijan) Qarabağ (UEL GS)	(Turkey) Trabzonspor (UEL GS)
Group stage		(Belgium) Gent (UEL PO)	Austria Wien (UEL PO)	(Scotland) Heart of Midlothian (UEL PO)	(Ukraine) Dnipro-1 (UEL PO)
Group stage		(Turkey) Sivasspor (UEL PO)	(Denmark) Silkeborg (UEL PO)	(Cyprus) Apollon Limassol (UEL PO)	(Lithuania) Žalgiris (UEL PO)
Group stage		(Republic of Ireland) Shamrock Rovers (UEL PO)	(Armenia) Pyunik (UEL PO)		
Play-off round	CH	(Slovenia) Maribor (UEL CH Q3)	(Slovakia) Slovan Bratislava (UEL CH Q3)	(Luxembourg) F91 Dudelange (UEL CH Q3)	(North Macedonia) Shkupi (UEL CH Q3)
Play-off round	CH	(Northern Ireland) Linfield (UEL CH Q3)			
Play-off round	MP	(England) West Ham United (7th)	(Spain) Villarreal (7th)	(Italy) Fiorentina (7th)	(Germany) 1. FC Köln (7th)
Play-off round	MP	(France) Nice (5th)	(Serbia) Partizan (UEL MP Q3)	(Czech Republic) Slovácko (UEL MP Q3)	
Third qualifying round	CH	(Belarus) Shakhtyor Soligorsk (UCL Q1)	(Latvia) RFS (UCL Q1)		
Third qualifying round	MP	(Portugal) Gil Vicente (5th)	(Netherlands) Twente (4th)	(Belgium) Anderlecht (3rd)	(Austria) Wolfsberger AC (4th)
Third qualifying round	MP	(Scotland) Dundee United (4th)	(Ukraine) Zorya Luhansk (Abd-4th)	(Croatia) Hajduk Split (CW)	(Switzerland) Lugano (CW)
Third qualifying round	MP	(Greece) Panathinaikos (CW)			
Second qualifying round	CH	(Romania) CFR Cluj (UCL Q1)	(Kazakhstan) Tobol (UCL Q1)	(Poland) Lech Poznań (UCL Q1)	(Bosnia and Herzegovina) Zrinjski Mostar (UCL Q1)
Second qualifying round	CH	(Albania) Tirana (UCL Q1)	(Georgia (country)) Dinamo Batumi (UCL Q1)	(Malta) Hibernians (UCL Q1)	(Faroe Islands) KÍ (UCL Q1)
Second qualifying round	CH	(Kosovo) Ballkani (UCL Q1)	(Gibraltar) Lincoln Red Imps (UCL Q1)	(Montenegro) Sutjeska (UCL Q1)	(Wales) The New Saints (UCL Q1)
Second qualifying round	CH	(Iceland) Víkingur Reykjavík (UCL Q1)	(Andorra) Inter Club d'Escaldes (UCL PR F)	(Estonia) FCI Levadia (UCL PR SF)	(San Marino) La Fiorita (UCL PR SF)
Second qualifying round	MP	(Portugal) Vitória de Guimarães (6th)	(Netherlands) AZ (PW)	(Belgium) Antwerp (4th)	(Austria) Rapid Wien (PW)
Second qualifying round	MP	(Scotland) Motherwell (5th)	(Ukraine) Vorskla Poltava (Abd-5th)	(Turkey) Konyaspor (3rd)	(Turkey) İstanbul Başakşehir (4th)
Second qualifying round	MP	(Denmark) Brøndby (4th)	(Denmark) Viborg (PW)	(Cyprus) APOEL (3rd)	(Cyprus) Aris Limassol (4th)
Second qualifying round	MP	(Serbia) Čukarički (3rd)	(Serbia) Radnički Niš (4th)	(Czech Republic) Slavia Prague (2nd)	(Czech Republic) Sparta Prague (3rd)
Second qualifying round	MP	(Croatia) Osijek (3rd)	(Croatia) Rijeka (4th)	(Switzerland) Basel (2nd)	(Switzerland) Young Boys (3rd)
Second qualifying round	MP	(Greece) PAOK (2nd)	(Greece) Aris (3rd)	(Israel) Hapoel Be'er Sheva (CW)	(Israel) Maccabi Tel Aviv (3rd)
Second qualifying round	MP	(Israel) Maccabi Netanya (4th)	(Norway) Molde (CW)	(Norway) Viking (3rd)	(Norway) Lillestrøm (4th)
Second qualifying round	MP	(Sweden) AIK (2nd)	(Sweden) Djurgårdens IF (3rd)	(Sweden) IF Elfsborg (4th)	(Bulgaria) Levski Sofia (CW)
Second qualifying round	MP	(Bulgaria) CSKA Sofia (2nd)	(Bulgaria) Botev Plovdiv (PW)	(Romania) Sepsi OSK (CW)	(Romania) FCSB (2nd)
Second qualifying round	MP	(Romania) Universitatea Craiova (PW)	(Azerbaijan) Neftçi (2nd)	(Azerbaijan) Zira (3rd)	(Azerbaijan) Gabala (4th)
Second qualifying round	MP	(Kazakhstan) Kairat (CW)	(Kazakhstan) Astana (2nd)	(Kazakhstan) Kyzylzhar (4th)	(Hungary) Kisvárda (2nd)
Second qualifying round	MP	(Hungary) Puskás Akadémia (3rd)	(Hungary) MOL Fehérvár (4th)	(Belarus) Gomel (CW)	(Belarus) BATE Borisov (2nd)
Second qualifying round	MP	(Poland) Raków Częstochowa (CW)	(Slovenia) Koper (CW)	(Slovakia) Spartak Trnava (CW)	(Liechtenstein) Vaduz (CW)
Second qualifying round	MP	(Lithuania) Sūduva (2nd)	(Luxembourg) Racing Union (CW)	(Bosnia and Herzegovina) Velež Mostar (CW)	(Republic of Ireland) St Patrick's Athletic (CW)
Second qualifying round	MP	(North Macedonia) Makedonija GP (CW)	Ararat-Armenia (2nd)	(Latvia) Valmiera (2nd)	(Albania) Vllaznia (CW)
First qualifying round		(Belarus) Dinamo Minsk (3rd)	(Poland) Pogoń Szczecin (3rd)	(Poland) Lechia Gdańsk (4th)	(Slovenia) Olimpija Ljubljana (3rd)
First qualifying round		(Slovenia) Mura (4th)	(Slovakia) Ružomberok (2nd)	(Slovakia) DAC Dunajská Streda (PW)	(Lithuania) Kauno Žalgiris (3rd)
First qualifying round		(Lithuania) Panevėžys (4th)	(Luxembourg) Differdange 03 (2nd)	(Luxembourg) Fola Esch (3rd)	(Bosnia and Herzegovina) Tuzla City (2nd)
First qualifying round		(Bosnia and Herzegovina) Borac Banja Luka (3rd)	(Republic of Ireland) Sligo Rovers (3rd)	(Republic of Ireland) Derry City (4th)	(North Macedonia) Akademija Pandev (2nd)
First qualifying round		(North Macedonia) Shkëndija (3rd)	(Armenia) Alashkert (3rd)	(Armenia) Ararat Yerevan (4th)	(Latvia) Liepāja (3rd)
First qualifying round		(Latvia) Riga (4th)	(Albania) Laçi (2nd)	(Albania) Partizani (3rd)	(Northern Ireland) Crusaders (CW)
First qualifying round		(Northern Ireland) Cliftonville (2nd)	(Northern Ireland) Larne (PW)	(Georgia (country)) Saburtalo Tbilisi (CW)	(Georgia (country)) Dinamo Tbilisi (2nd)
First qualifying round		(Georgia (country)) Dila Gori (3rd)	(Finland) KuPS (CW)	(Finland) SJK (3rd)	(Finland) Inter Turku (4th)
First qualifying round		(Moldova) Petrocub Hîncești (2nd)	(Moldova) Milsami Orhei (3rd)	(Moldova) Sfîntul Gheorghe (4th)	(Malta) Floriana (CW)
First qualifying round		(Malta) Hamrun Spartans (3rd)	(Malta) Gżira United (4th)	(Faroe Islands) B36 (CW)	(Faroe Islands) HB (2nd)
First qualifying round		(Faroe Islands) Víkingur Gøta (3rd)	(Kosovo) Llapi (CW)	(Kosovo) Drita (2nd)	(Kosovo) Gjilani (3rd)
First qualifying round		(Gibraltar) Europa (2nd)	(Gibraltar) St Joseph's (3rd)	(Gibraltar) FCB Magpies (4th)	(Montenegro) Budućnost Podgorica (CW)
First qualifying round		(Montenegro) Dečić (3rd)	(Montenegro) Iskra (4th)	(Wales) Bala Town (2nd)	(Wales) Newtown (3rd)
First qualifying round		(Iceland) Breiðablik (2nd)	(Iceland) KR (3rd)	(Estonia) Paide Linnameeskond (CW)	(Estonia) Flora (2nd)
First qualifying round		(Andorra) Atlètic Club d'Escaldes (CW)	(Andorra) UE Santa Coloma (2nd)	(San Marino) Tre Fiori (CW)	(San Marino) Tre Penne (2nd)

One team not playing in a national top division will take part in the competition: Vaduz (2nd tier).

Notes

1. Champions League (UCL Q1): Two of the Champions League first qualifying round losers were drawn to receive byes to the third qualifying round (Champions Path), as two fewer losers were transferred to the second qualifying round (Champions Path), due to Champions League group stage berths vacated following the UCL title holders qualifying via league position and the suspension of Russia from the 2022–23 European season.
2. Armenia (ARM): Noravank would have qualified for the Europa Conference League second qualifying round as the winners of the 2021–22 Armenian Cup, but failed to obtain a UEFA licence. As a result, the berth reserved for the second qualifying round was given to the second-placed team of the 2021–22 Armenian Premier League, Ararat-Armenia, who originally entered the first qualifying round, and the berth reserved for the first qualifying round was given to the fourth-placed team, Ararat Yerevan.
3. Liechtenstein (LIE): The seven teams affiliated with the Liechtenstein Football Association (LFV) all played in the Swiss football league system. The only competition organised by the LFV was the Liechtenstein Football Cup – the winners of which qualified for the UEFA Europa Conference League.
4. Russia (RUS): On 28 February 2022, Russian football clubs and national teams were suspended from FIFA and UEFA competitions due to the Russian invasion of Ukraine. On 2 May 2022, UEFA confirmed that Russian clubs would be excluded from the 2022–23 UEFA competitions.
5. Ukraine (UKR): The 2021–22 Ukrainian Premier League was abandoned due to the Russian invasion of Ukraine. The fourth and fifth-placed teams of the league at the time of the abandonment (Zorya Luhansk and Vorskla Poltava) were selected to play in the 2022–23 UEFA Europa Conference League by the Ukrainian Association of Football.

== Schedule ==
The schedule of the competition was as follows. Matches were scheduled for Thursdays apart from the final, which took place on a Wednesday, though exceptionally could take place on Tuesdays or Wednesdays due to scheduling conflicts (especially featuring teams from associations where there were few approved stadiums, such as Gibraltar and Wales). Scheduled kick-off times starting from the group stage were 18:45 and 21:00 CEST/CET, though exceptionally could take place at 16:30 due to geographical reasons.

As the 2022 FIFA World Cup took place in Qatar between 20 November and 18 December 2022, the group stage commenced in the first week of September 2022 and concluded in the first week of November 2022 to make way for the World Cup.

The draws for the qualifying round were held at the UEFA headquarters in Nyon, Switzerland. The group stage draw took place in Istanbul, Turkey.

Schedule for 2022–23 UEFA Europa Conference League
Phase	Round	Draw date	First leg	Second leg
Qualifying	First qualifying round	14 June 2022	7 July 2022	14 July 2022
Qualifying	Second qualifying round	15 June 2022	21 July 2022	28 July 2022
Qualifying	Third qualifying round	18 July 2022	4 August 2022	11 August 2022
Play-offs	Play-off round	2 August 2022	18 August 2022	25 August 2022
Group stage	Matchday 1	26 August 2022	8 September 2022	
Group stage	Matchday 2	26 August 2022	15 September 2022	
Group stage	Matchday 3	26 August 2022	6 October 2022	
Group stage	Matchday 4	26 August 2022	13 October 2022	
Group stage	Matchday 5	26 August 2022	27 October 2022	
Group stage	Matchday 6	26 August 2022	3 November 2022	
Knockout phase	Knockout round play-offs	7 November 2022	16 February 2023	23 February 2023
Knockout phase	Round of 16	24 February 2023	9 March 2023	16 March 2023
Knockout phase	Quarter-finals	17 March 2023	13 April 2023	20 April 2023
Knockout phase	Semi-finals	17 March 2023	11 May 2023	18 May 2023
Knockout phase	Final	17 March 2023	7 June 2023 at Fortuna Arena, Prague	

== Qualifying rounds ==
=== First qualifying round ===
The draw for the first qualifying round was held on 14 June 2022. The first legs were played on 5, 6 and 7 July, and the second legs were played on 12 and 14 July 2022.

The winners of the ties advanced to the Main Path second qualifying round. The losers were eliminated from European competitions for the season.

Team 1	Agg.	Team 2	1st leg	2nd leg
Alashkert (Armenia)	2–4	(Malta) Hamrun Spartans	1–0	1–4
Lechia Gdańsk (Poland)	6–2	(North Macedonia) Akademija Pandev	4–1	2–1
Inter Turku (Finland)	1–3	(Kosovo) Drita	1–0	0–3
Dinamo Tbilisi (Georgia (country))	4–4 (5–6 p)	(Estonia) Paide Linnameeskond	2–3	2–1 (a.e.t.)
Panevėžys (Lithuania)	0–2	(Moldova) Milsami Orhei	0–0	0–2
Laçi (Albania)	1–0	(Montenegro) Iskra	0–0	1–0
Gjilani (Kosovo)	2–3 (Note: Order of legs reversed after original draw.)	(Latvia) Liepāja	1–0	1–3
Sfîntul Gheorghe (Moldova)	2–4	(Slovenia) Mura	1–2	1–2
KuPS (Finland)	2–0	(Georgia (country)) Dila Gori	2–0	0–0
Ružomberok (Slovakia)	2–0	(Lithuania) Kauno Žalgiris	2–0	0–0
Budućnost Podgorica (Montenegro)	4–2	(Kosovo) Llapi	2–0	2–2
Gżira United (Malta)	2–1	(Andorra) Atlètic Club d'Escaldes	1–1	1–0 (a.e.t.)
Borac Banja Luka (Bosnia and Herzegovina)	3–3 (3–4 p)	(Faroe Islands) B36	2–0	1–3 (a.e.t.)
Olimpija Ljubljana (Slovenia)	3–2	(Luxembourg) Differdange 03	1–1	2–1 (a.e.t.)
St Joseph's (Gibraltar)	1–0	(Northern Ireland) Larne	0–0	1–0
UE Santa Coloma (Andorra)	1–5	(Iceland) Breiðablik	0–1	1–4
DAC Dunajská Streda (Slovakia)	5–1	(Northern Ireland) Cliftonville	2–1	3–0
Víkingur Gøta (Faroe Islands)	3–1	(Gibraltar) Europa	1–0	2–1
Bala Town (Wales)	2–2 (3–4 p)	(Republic of Ireland) Sligo Rovers	1–2	1–0 (a.e.t.)
Fola Esch (Luxembourg)	1–4	(San Marino) Tre Fiori	0–1	1–3
Dinamo Minsk (Belarus)	3–2	(Montenegro) Dečić	1–1	2–1
Tre Penne (San Marino)	0–8	(Bosnia and Herzegovina) Tuzla City	0–2	0–6
Saburtalo Tbilisi (Georgia (country))	1–1 (5–4 p)	(Albania) Partizani	0–1	1–0 (a.e.t.)
Shkëndija (North Macedonia)	4–2	(Armenia) Ararat Yerevan	2–0	2–2
Floriana (Malta)	0–1	(Moldova) Petrocub Hîncești	0–0	0–1
Pogoń Szczecin (Poland)	4–2	(Iceland) KR	4–1	0–1
HB (Faroe Islands)	2–2 (2–4 p)	(Wales) Newtown	1–0	1–2 (a.e.t.)
FCB Magpies (Gibraltar)	3–4	(Northern Ireland) Crusaders	2–1	1–3
Flora (Estonia)	3–4	(Finland) SJK	1–0	2–4 (a.e.t.)
Derry City (Republic of Ireland)	0–4	(Latvia) Riga	0–2	0–2

=== Second qualifying round ===
The draw for the second qualifying round was held on 15 June 2022. The first legs were played on 19, 20 and 21 July, and the second legs were played on 26, 27 and 28 July 2022.

The winners of the ties advanced to the third qualifying round of their respective path. The losers were eliminated from European competitions for the season.

Team 1	Agg.	Team 2	1st leg	2nd leg
Champions Path
Shakhtyor Soligorsk (Belarus)	Bye	N/A	—	—
RFS (Latvia)	Bye	N/A	—	—
La Fiorita (San Marino)	0–10	(Kosovo) Ballkani	0–4	0–6
Víkingur Reykjavík (Iceland)	2–0	(Wales) The New Saints	2–0	0–0
Sutjeska (Montenegro)	0–1	(Faroe Islands) KÍ	0–0	0–1
Hibernians (Malta)	4–3	(Estonia) FCI Levadia	3–2	1–1
Tirana (Albania)	2–4	(Bosnia and Herzegovina) Zrinjski Mostar	0–1	2–3
Lech Poznań (Poland)	6–1	(Georgia (country)) Dinamo Batumi	5–0	1–1
CFR Cluj (Romania)	4–1	(Andorra) Inter Club d'Escaldes	3–0	1–1
Tobol (Kazakhstan)	3–0	(Gibraltar) Lincoln Red Imps	2–0	1–0
Main Path
Gżira United (Malta)	5–5 (3–1 p)	(Serbia) Radnički Niš	2–2	3–3 (a.e.t.)
Aris (Greece)	7–2 (Note: Order of legs reversed after original draw.)	(Belarus) Gomel	5–1	2–1
Botev Plovdiv (Bulgaria)	0–2	(Cyprus) APOEL	0–0	0–2
MOL Fehérvár (Hungary)	5–3	(Azerbaijan) Gabala	4–1	1–2
İstanbul Başakşehir (Turkey)	2–1	(Israel) Maccabi Netanya	1–1	1–0
Aris Limassol (Cyprus)	2–3	(Azerbaijan) Neftçi	2–0	0–3
Velež Mostar (Bosnia and Herzegovina)	0–2	(Malta) Hamrun Spartans	0–1	0–1
Saburtalo Tbilisi (Georgia (country))	3–4	(Romania) FCSB	1–0	2–4
Makedonija GP (North Macedonia)	0–4	(Bulgaria) CSKA Sofia	0–0	0–4
Hapoel Be'er Sheva (Israel)	3–1	(Belarus) Dinamo Minsk	2–1	1–0
Zira (Azerbaijan)	0–3	(Israel) Maccabi Tel Aviv	0–3	0–0
Vllaznia (Albania)	1–4	(Romania) Universitatea Craiova	1–1	0–3
Ararat-Armenia	0–0 (3–5 p)	(Estonia) Paide Linnameeskond	0–0	0–0 (a.e.t.)
Kairat (Kazakhstan)	0–2	(Hungary) Kisvárda	0–1	0–1
BATE Borisov (Belarus)	0–5	(Turkey) Konyaspor	0–3	0–2
Sepsi OSK (Romania)	3–3 (4–2 p)	(Slovenia) Olimpija Ljubljana	3–1	0–2 (a.e.t.)
Kyzylzhar (Kazakhstan)	3–2	(Croatia) Osijek	1–2	2–0
Liepāja (Latvia)	0–4	(Switzerland) Young Boys	0–1	0–3
Rapid Wien (Austria)	2–1	(Poland) Lechia Gdańsk	0–0	2–1
SJK (Finland)	2–6	(Norway) Lillestrøm	0–1	2–5
Breiðablik (Iceland)	3–2	(Montenegro) Budućnost Podgorica	2–0	1–2
St Patrick's Athletic (Republic of Ireland)	1–1 (6–5 p)	(Slovenia) Mura	1–1	0–0 (a.e.t.)
St Joseph's (Gibraltar)	0–11	(Czech Republic) Slavia Prague	0–4	0–7
Spartak Trnava (Slovakia)	6–2	(Wales) Newtown	4–1	2–1
Sūduva (Lithuania)	0–2	(Denmark) Viborg	0–1	0–1
Víkingur Gøta (Faroe Islands)	0–4	(Slovakia) DAC Dunajská Streda	0–2	0–2
Pogoń Szczecin (Poland)	1–5	(Denmark) Brøndby	1–1	0–4
AZ (Netherlands)	5–0	(Bosnia and Herzegovina) Tuzla City	1–0	4–0
Motherwell (Scotland)	0–3	(Republic of Ireland) Sligo Rovers	0–1	0–2
Molde (Norway)	6–2	(Sweden) IF Elfsborg	4–1	2–1
Koper (Slovenia)	1–2	(Liechtenstein) Vaduz	0–1	1–1 (a.e.t.)
B36 (Faroe Islands)	1–0	(San Marino) Tre Fiori	1–0	0–0
Ružomberok (Slovakia)	1–5	(Latvia) Riga	0–3	1–2
Basel (Switzerland)	3–1	(Northern Ireland) Crusaders	2–0	1–1
Antwerp (Belgium)	2–0	(Kosovo) Drita	0–0	2–0
Petrocub Hîncești (Moldova)	4–1	(Albania) Laçi	0–0	4–1
Racing Union (Luxembourg)	1–8	(Serbia) Čukarički	1–4	0–4
Levski Sofia (Bulgaria)	3–1	(Greece) PAOK	2–0	1–1
Vitória de Guimarães (Portugal)	3–0	(Hungary) Puskás Akadémia	3–0	0–0
Rijeka (Croatia)	1–4	(Sweden) Djurgårdens IF	1–2	0–2
Vorskla Poltava (Ukraine)	3–4	(Sweden) AIK	3–2	0–2 (a.e.t.)
Valmiera (Latvia)	2–5	(North Macedonia) Shkëndija	1–2	1–3
Raków Częstochowa (Poland)	6–0	(Kazakhstan) Astana	5–0	1–0
KuPS (Finland)	6–3	(Moldova) Milsami Orhei	2–2	4–1
Sparta Prague (Czech Republic)	1–2	(Norway) Viking	0–0	1–2

=== Third qualifying round ===
The draw for the third qualifying round was held on 18 July 2022. The first legs were played on 3 and 4 August, and the second legs were played on 9, 10 and 11 August 2022.

The winners of the ties advanced to the play-off round of their respective path. The losers were eliminated from European competitions for the season.

Team 1	Agg.	Team 2	1st leg	2nd leg
Champions Path
Víkingur Reykjavík (Iceland)	2–4	(Poland) Lech Poznań	1–0	1–4 (a.e.t.)
RFS (Latvia)	4–2	(Malta) Hibernians	1–1	3–1
Ballkani (Kosovo)	4–4 (4–3 p)	(Faroe Islands) KÍ	3–2	1–2 (a.e.t.)
Zrinjski Mostar (Bosnia and Herzegovina)	2–1	(Kazakhstan) Tobol	1–0	1–1
Shakhtyor Soligorsk (Belarus)	0–1	(Romania) CFR Cluj	0–0	0–1
Main Path
Spartak Trnava (Slovakia)	0–3	(Poland) Raków Częstochowa	0–2	0–1
AIK (Sweden)	2–2 (3–2 p)	(North Macedonia) Shkëndija	1–1	1–1 (a.e.t.)
Viking (Norway)	5–2	(Republic of Ireland) Sligo Rovers	5–1	0–1
Breiðablik (Iceland)	1–6	(Turkey) İstanbul Başakşehir	1–3	0–3
KuPS (Finland)	0–5	(Switzerland) Young Boys	0–2	0–3
Paide Linnameeskond (Estonia)	0–5	(Belgium) Anderlecht	0–2	0–3
Viborg (Denmark)	5–1	(Faroe Islands) B36	3–0	2–1
Hajduk Split (Croatia)	3–2	(Portugal) Vitória de Guimarães	3–1	0–1
Brøndby (Denmark)	2–2 (1–3 p)	(Switzerland) Basel	1–0	1–2 (a.e.t.)
Lillestrøm (Norway)	1–5	(Belgium) Antwerp	1–3	0–2
CSKA Sofia (Bulgaria)	2–1	(Republic of Ireland) St Patrick's Athletic	0–1	2–0
Dundee United (Scotland)	1–7	(Netherlands) AZ	1–0	0–7
APOEL (Cyprus)	1–0	(Kazakhstan) Kyzylzhar	1–0	0–0
DAC Dunajská Streda (Slovakia)	0–2	(Romania) FCSB	0–1	0–1
Riga (Latvia)	1–5	(Portugal) Gil Vicente	1–1	0–4
Wolfsberger AC (Austria)	4–0	(Malta) Gżira United	0–0	4–0
Maccabi Tel Aviv (Israel)	3–2	(Greece) Aris	2–0	1–2
Molde (Norway)	4–2	(Hungary) Kisvárda	3–0	1–2
Neftçi (Azerbaijan)	2–3	(Austria) Rapid Wien	2–1	0–2 (a.e.t.)
Lugano (Switzerland)	1–5	(Israel) Hapoel Be'er Sheva	0–2	1–3
Hamrun Spartans (Malta)	2–2 (4–1 p) (Note: Order of legs reversed after original draw.)	(Bulgaria) Levski Sofia	0–1	2–1 (a.e.t.)
Čukarički (Serbia)	2–7	(Netherlands) Twente	1–3	1–4
Zorya Luhansk (Ukraine)	1–3	(Romania) Universitatea Craiova	1–0	0–3
Vaduz (Liechtenstein)	5–3	(Turkey) Konyaspor	1–1	4–2
Sepsi OSK (Romania)	2–6	(Sweden) Djurgårdens IF	1–3	1–3
MOL Fehérvár (Hungary)	7–1	(Moldova) Petrocub Hîncești	5–0	2–1
Slavia Prague (Czech Republic)	3–1	(Greece) Panathinaikos	2–0	1–1

== Play-off round ==
The draw for the play-off round was held on 2 August 2022. The first legs were played on 17 and 18 August, and the second legs were played on 23 and 25 August 2022.

The winners of the ties advanced to the group stage. The losers were eliminated from European competitions for the season.

Team 1	Agg.	Team 2	1st leg	2nd leg
Champions Path
Maribor (Slovenia)	0–1	(Romania) CFR Cluj	0–0	0–1
RFS (Latvia)	3–3 (4–2 p)	(Northern Ireland) Linfield	2–2	1–1 (a.e.t.)
Lech Poznań (Poland)	3–1	(Luxembourg) F91 Dudelange	2–0	1–1
Shkupi (North Macedonia)	1–3	(Kosovo) Ballkani	1–2	0–1
Zrinjski Mostar (Bosnia and Herzegovina)	2–2 (5–6 p)	(Slovakia) Slovan Bratislava	1–0	1–2 (a.e.t.)
Main Path
CSKA Sofia (Bulgaria)	1–2	(Switzerland) Basel	1–0	0–2
Vaduz (Liechtenstein)	2–1	(Austria) Rapid Wien	1–1	1–0
Raków Częstochowa (Poland)	2–3	(Czech Republic) Slavia Prague	2–1	0–2 (a.e.t.)
Djurgårdens IF (Sweden)	5–3 (Note: Order of legs reversed after original draw.)	(Cyprus) APOEL	3–0	2–3
Maccabi Tel Aviv (Israel)	1–2	(France) Nice	1–0	0–2 (a.e.t.)
Universitatea Craiova (Romania)	2–2 (3–4 p)	(Israel) Hapoel Be'er Sheva	1–1	1–1 (a.e.t.)
İstanbul Başakşehir (Turkey)	4–2	(Belgium) Antwerp	1–1	3–1
FCSB (Romania)	4–3	(Norway) Viking	1–2	3–1
Partizan (Serbia)	7–4	(Malta) Hamrun Spartans	4–1	3–3
Fiorentina (Italy)	2–1	(Netherlands) Twente	2–1	0–0
Villarreal (Spain)	6–2	(Croatia) Hajduk Split	4–2	2–0
1. FC Köln (Germany)	4–2	(Hungary) MOL Fehérvár	1–2	3–0
West Ham United (England)	6–1	(Denmark) Viborg	3–1	3–0
Young Boys (Switzerland)	1–1 (1–3 p)	(Belgium) Anderlecht	0–1	1–0 (a.e.t.)
Slovácko (Czech Republic)	4–0	(Sweden) AIK	3–0	1–0
Molde (Norway)	4–1	(Austria) Wolfsberger AC	0–1	4–0
AZ (Netherlands)	6–1	(Portugal) Gil Vicente	4–0	2–1

== Group stage ==
Location of teams of the 2022–23 UEFA Europa Conference League group stage.
Brown: Group A; Red: Group B; Orange: Group C; Yellow: Group D;
Green: Group E; Blue: Group F; Purple: Group G; Pink: Group H.

The draw for the group stage was held on 26 August 2022. The 32 teams were drawn into eight groups of four. For the draw, the teams were seeded into four pots, each of eight teams, based on their 2022 UEFA club coefficients. Teams from the same association and, for political reasons, teams from Serbia and Kosovo could not be drawn into the same group.

All teams besides AZ, Basel, CFR Cluj, Gent, Partizan, Slavia Prague and Slovan Bratislava, who competed in last season's group stage, made their debut appearances in the group stage. Ballkani, Djurgårdens IF, Dnipro-1, Pyunik, RFS, Silkeborg, Slovácko, Vaduz and Žalgiris made their debut appearances in a UEFA competition group stage. Ballkani, Vaduz and Žalgiris were the first teams from Kosovo, Liechtenstein and Lithuania, respectively, to play in a UEFA competition group stage.

A total of 28 national associations were represented in the group stage.

=== Group A ===
Pos	Team	Pld	W	D	L	GF	GA	GD	Pts	Qualification	IBS	FIO	HEA	RFS
1	(Turkey) İstanbul Başakşehir	6	4	1	1	14	3	+11	13 (Note: Tied on head-to-head points. Head-to-head goal difference: İstanbul Başakşehir +2, Fiorentina −2.)	Advance to round of 16	—	3–0	3–1	3–0
2	(Italy) Fiorentina	6	4	1	1	14	6	+8	13	Advance to knockout round play-offs	2–1	—	5–1	1–1
3	(Scotland) Heart of Midlothian	6	2	0	4	6	16	−10	6		0–4	0–3	—	2–1
4	(Latvia) RFS	6	0	2	4	2	11	−9	2		0–0	0–3	0–2	—

Source: UEFA

=== Group B ===
Pos	Team	Pld	W	D	L	GF	GA	GD	Pts	Qualification	WHU	AND	SIL	FCSB
1	(England) West Ham United	6	6	0	0	13	4	+9	18	Advance to round of 16	—	2–1	1–0	3–1
2	(Belgium) Anderlecht	6	2	2	2	6	5	+1	8	Advance to knockout round play-offs	0–1	—	1–0	2–2
3	(Denmark) Silkeborg	6	2	0	4	12	7	+5	6		2–3	0–2	—	5–0
4	(Romania) FCSB	6	0	2	4	3	18	−15	2		0–3	0–0	0–5	—

Source: UEFA

=== Group C ===
Pos	Team	Pld	W	D	L	GF	GA	GD	Pts	Qualification	VIL	LCH	HBS	AW
1	(Spain) Villarreal	6	4	1	1	14	9	+5	13	Advance to round of 16	—	4–3	2–2	5–0
2	(Poland) Lech Poznań	6	2	3	1	12	7	+5	9	Advance to knockout round play-offs	3–0	—	0–0	4–1
3	(Israel) Hapoel Be'er Sheva	6	1	4	1	8	5	+3	7		1–2	1–1	—	4–0
4	Austria Wien	6	0	2	4	2	15	−13	2		0–1	1–1	0–0	—

Source: UEFA

=== Group D ===
Pos	Team	Pld	W	D	L	GF	GA	GD	Pts	Qualification	NCE	PRT	KLN	SVK
1	(France) Nice	6	2	3	1	8	7	+1	9 (Note: Head-to-head points: Nice 4, Partizan 1.)	Advance to round of 16	—	2–1	1–1	1–2
2	(Serbia) Partizan	6	2	3	1	9	7	+2	9	Advance to knockout round play-offs	1–1	—	2–0	1–1
3	(Germany) 1. FC Köln	6	2	2	2	8	8	0	8		2–2	0–1	—	4–2
4	(Czech Republic) Slovácko	6	1	2	3	8	11	−3	5		0–1	3–3	0–1	—

Source: UEFA

=== Group E ===
Pos	Team	Pld	W	D	L	GF	GA	GD	Pts	Qualification	AZ	DNI	APL	VAD
1	(Netherlands) AZ	6	5	0	1	12	6	+6	15	Advance to round of 16	—	2–1	3–2	4–1
2	(Ukraine) Dnipro-1	6	3	1	2	9	7	+2	10	Advance to knockout round play-offs	0–1	—	1–0	2–2
3	(Cyprus) Apollon Limassol	6	2	1	3	5	7	−2	7		1–0	1–3	—	1–0
4	(Liechtenstein) Vaduz	6	0	2	4	5	11	−6	2		1–2	1–2	0–0	—

Source: UEFA

=== Group F ===
Pos	Team	Pld	W	D	L	GF	GA	GD	Pts	Qualification	DJU	GNT	MOL	SHR
1	(Sweden) Djurgårdens IF	6	5	1	0	12	6	+6	16	Advance to round of 16	—	4–2	3–2	1–0
2	(Belgium) Gent	6	2	2	2	10	6	+4	8	Advance to knockout round play-offs	0–1	—	4–0	3–0
3	(Norway) Molde	6	2	1	3	9	10	−1	7		2–3	0–0	—	3–0
4	(Republic of Ireland) Shamrock Rovers	6	0	2	4	1	10	−9	2		0–0	1–1	0–2	—

Source: UEFA

=== Group G ===
Pos	Team	Pld	W	D	L	GF	GA	GD	Pts	Qualification	SIV	CLJ	SLP	BLK
1	(Turkey) Sivasspor	6	3	2	1	11	7	+4	11	Advance to round of 16	—	3–0	1–1	3–4
2	(Romania) CFR Cluj	6	3	1	2	5	5	0	10	Advance to knockout round play-offs	0–1	—	2–0	1–0
3	(Czech Republic) Slavia Prague	6	2	2	2	6	7	−1	8		1–1	0–1	—	3–2
4	(Kosovo) Ballkani	6	1	1	4	8	11	−3	4		1–2	1–1	0–1	—

Source: UEFA

=== Group H ===
Pos	Team	Pld	W	D	L	GF	GA	GD	Pts	Qualification	SLO	BSL	PYU	ZAL
1	(Slovakia) Slovan Bratislava	6	3	2	1	9	7	+2	11 (Note: Head-to-head points: Slovan Bratislava 4, Basel 1.)	Advance to round of 16	—	3–3	2–1	0–0
2	(Switzerland) Basel	6	3	2	1	11	9	+2	11	Advance to knockout round play-offs	0–2	—	3–1	2–2
3	(Armenia) Pyunik	6	2	0	4	8	9	−1	6		2–0	1–2	—	2–0
4	(Lithuania) Žalgiris	6	1	2	3	5	8	−3	5		1–2	0–1	2–1	—

Source: UEFA

== Knockout phase ==
In the knockout phase, teams played against each other over two legs on a home-and-away basis, except for the one-match final. The mechanism of the draws for each round was as follows:

- In the draw for the knockout round play-offs, the eight group runners-up were seeded, and the eight Europa League group third-placed teams were unseeded. The seeded teams were drawn against the unseeded teams, with the seeded teams hosting the second leg. Teams from the same association could not be drawn against each other.
- In the draw for the round of 16, the eight group winners were seeded, and the eight winners of the knockout round play-offs were unseeded. Again, the seeded teams were drawn against the unseeded teams, with the seeded teams hosting the second leg. Teams from the same association could not be drawn against each other.
- In the draws for the quarter-finals and semi-finals, there were no seedings, and teams from the same association could be drawn against each other. As the draws for the quarter-finals and semi-finals were held together before the quarter-finals were played, the identity of the quarter-final winners was not known at the time of the semi-final draw. A draw was also held to determine which semi-final winner would be designated as the "home" team for the final (for administrative purposes as it was played at a neutral venue).

=== Bracket ===
Knockout round play-offs
(Norway) Bodø/Glimt	0	0	0
(Poland) Lech Poznań	0	1	1
(Portugal) Braga	0	2	2
(Italy) Fiorentina	4	3	7
(Turkey) Trabzonspor	1	0	1
(Switzerland) Basel	0	2	2
(Moldova) Sheriff Tiraspol	0	3	3
(Serbia) Partizan	1	1	2
(Azerbaijan) Qarabağ	1	0	1 (3)
(Belgium) Gent (p)	0	1	1 (5)
(Cyprus) AEK Larnaca	1	0	1
(Ukraine) Dnipro-1	0	0	0
(Bulgaria) Ludogorets Razgrad	1	1	2 (0)
(Belgium) Anderlecht (p)	0	2	2 (3)
(Italy) Lazio	1	0	1
(Romania) CFR Cluj	0	0	0

Round of 16
(Poland) Lech Poznań	2	3	5
(Sweden) Djurgårdens IF	0	0	0
(Italy) Fiorentina	1	4	5
(Turkey) Sivasspor	0	1	1
(Switzerland) Basel (p)	2	2	4 (4)
(Slovakia) Slovan Bratislava	2	2	4 (1)
(Moldova) Sheriff Tiraspol	0	1	1
(France) Nice	1	3	4
(Belgium) Gent	1	4	5
(Turkey) İstanbul Başakşehir	1	1	2
(Cyprus) AEK Larnaca	0	0	0
(England) West Ham United	2	4	6
(Belgium) Anderlecht	1	1	2
(Spain) Villarreal	1	0	1
(Italy) Lazio	1	1	2
(Netherlands) AZ	2	2	4

Quarter-finals
(Poland) Lech Poznań	1	3	4
(Italy) Fiorentina	4	2	6
(Switzerland) Basel (a.e.t.)	2	2	4
(France) Nice	2	1	3
(Belgium) Gent	1	1	2
(England) West Ham United	1	4	5
(Belgium) Anderlecht	2	0	2 (1)
(Netherlands) AZ (p)	0	2	2 (4)

Semi-finals
(Italy) Fiorentina (a.e.t.)	1	3	4
(Switzerland) Basel	2	1	3
(England) West Ham United	2	1	3
(Netherlands) AZ	1	0	1

Final
7 June – Prague
(Italy) Fiorentina	1
(England) West Ham United	2

=== Knockout round play-offs ===
The draw for the knockout round play-offs was held on 7 November 2022, 14:00 CET. The first legs were played on 16 February, and the second legs were played on 23 February 2023.

Team 1	Agg.	Team 2	1st leg	2nd leg
Qarabağ (Azerbaijan)	1–1 (3–5 p)	(Belgium) Gent	1–0	0–1 (a.e.t.)
Trabzonspor (Turkey)	1–2	(Switzerland) Basel	1–0	0–2
Lazio (Italy)	1–0	(Romania) CFR Cluj	1–0	0–0
Bodø/Glimt (Norway)	0–1	(Poland) Lech Poznań	0–0	0–1
Braga (Portugal)	2–7	(Italy) Fiorentina	0–4	2–3
AEK Larnaca (Cyprus)	1–0	(Ukraine) Dnipro-1	1–0	0–0
Sheriff Tiraspol (Moldova)	3–2	(Serbia) Partizan	0–1	3–1
Ludogorets Razgrad (Bulgaria)	2–2 (0–3 p)	(Belgium) Anderlecht	1–0	1–2 (a.e.t.)

=== Round of 16 ===
The draw for the round of 16 was held on 24 February 2023, 13:00 CET. The first legs were played on 7 and 9 March, and the second legs were played on 15 and 16 March 2023.

Team 1	Agg.	Team 2	1st leg	2nd leg
AEK Larnaca (Cyprus)	0–6	(England) West Ham United	0–2	0–4
Fiorentina (Italy)	5–1	(Turkey) Sivasspor	1–0	4–1
Lazio (Italy)	2–4	(Netherlands) AZ	1–2	1–2
Lech Poznań (Poland)	5–0	(Sweden) Djurgårdens IF	2–0	3–0
Basel (Switzerland)	4–4 (4–1 p)	(Slovakia) Slovan Bratislava	2–2	2–2 (a.e.t.)
Sheriff Tiraspol (Moldova)	1–4	(France) Nice	0–1	1–3
Anderlecht (Belgium)	2–1	(Spain) Villarreal	1–1	1–0
Gent (Belgium)	5–2	(Turkey) İstanbul Başakşehir	1–1	4–1

=== Quarter-finals ===
The draw for the quarter-finals was held on 17 March 2023, 14:00 CET. The first legs were played on 13 April, and the second legs were played on 20 April 2023.

Team 1	Agg.	Team 2	1st leg	2nd leg
Lech Poznań (Poland)	4–6	(Italy) Fiorentina	1–4	3–2
Gent (Belgium)	2–5	(England) West Ham United	1–1	1–4
Anderlecht (Belgium)	2–2 (1–4 p) (Note: Order of legs reversed after original draw.)	(Netherlands) AZ	2–0	0–2 (a.e.t.)
Basel (Switzerland)	4–3	(France) Nice	2–2	2–1 (a.e.t.)

=== Semi-finals ===
The draw for the semi-finals was held on 17 March 2023, 14:00 CET, after the quarter-final draw. The first legs were played on 11 May, and the second legs were played on 18 May 2023.

Team 1	Agg.	Team 2	1st leg	2nd leg
Fiorentina (Italy)	4–3	(Switzerland) Basel	1–2	3–1 (a.e.t.)
West Ham United (England)	3–1	(Netherlands) AZ	2–1	1–0

=== Final ===
The final was played on 7 June 2023 at the Fortuna Arena in Prague. A draw was held on 17 March 2023, after the quarter-final and semi-final draws, to determine the "home" team for administrative purposes.

7 June 2023
21:00 UTC+2

Fiorentina (Italian Football Federation)	1–2	(The Football Association) West Ham United
Bonaventura 67'	Report	Benrahma 62' (pen.); Bowen 90'

Fortuna Arena, Prague
Attendance: 17,363
Referee: Carlos del Cerro Grande (Spain)

== Statistics ==
Statistics exclude qualifying rounds and play-off round.

=== Top goalscorers ===
Rank	Player	Team	Goals	Minutes played
1	(Brazil) Arthur Cabral	(Italy) Fiorentina	7	704
1	(Switzerland) Zeki Amdouni	(Switzerland) Basel	7	876
3	(Jamaica) Michail Antonio	(England) West Ham United	6	610
3	(Serbia) Luka Jović	(Italy) Fiorentina	6	649
3	(Belgium) Hugo Cuypers	(Belgium) Gent	6	878
6	(Norway) Kristoffer Velde	(Poland) Lech Poznań	5	396
6	(Nigeria) Gift Orban	(Belgium) Gent	5	441
6	(Czech Republic) Antonín Barák	(Italy) Fiorentina	5	486
6	(Greece) Vangelis Pavlidis	(Netherlands) AZ	5	532
6	(Ukraine) Artem Dovbyk	(Ukraine) Dnipro-1	5	628
6	(England) Jarrod Bowen	(England) West Ham United	5	744
6	(Switzerland) Andi Zeqiri	(Switzerland) Basel	5	779
6	(Argentina) Nicolás González	(Italy) Fiorentina	5	830
6	(Sweden) Mikael Ishak	(Poland) Lech Poznań	5	943
6	(Poland) Michał Skóraś	(Poland) Lech Poznań	5	1040

=== Team of the Season ===
The UEFA technical study group selected the following players as the team of the tournament.

Pos.	Player	Team
GK	(France) Alphonse Areola	(England) West Ham United
DF	(Switzerland) Dan Ndoye	(Switzerland) Basel
DF	(Serbia) Nikola Milenković	(Italy) Fiorentina
DF	(Morocco) Nayef Aguerd	(England) West Ham United
DF	(Italy) Cristiano Biraghi	(Italy) Fiorentina
MF	(France) Andy Diouf	(Switzerland) Basel
MF	(Brazil) Lucas Paquetá	(England) West Ham United
MF	(England) Declan Rice	(England) West Ham United
FW	(Argentina) Nicolás González	(Italy) Fiorentina
FW	(Jamaica) Michail Antonio	(England) West Ham United
FW	(England) Jarrod Bowen	(England) West Ham United

=== Player of the Season ===
- (England) Declan Rice ( (England) West Ham United)

=== Young Player of the Season ===
- (France) Andy Diouf ( (Switzerland) Basel)

== See also ==
- 2022–23 UEFA Champions League
- 2022–23 UEFA Europa League
- 2022–23 UEFA Women's Champions League
- 2022–23 UEFA Youth League
