= 2022–23 UEFA Europa Conference League qualifying (third and play-off round matches) =

European football competition

This page summarises the matches of the third qualifying and play-off rounds of 2022–23 UEFA Europa Conference League qualifying.

Times are CEST (UTC+2), as listed by UEFA (local times, if different, are in parentheses).

== Third qualifying round ==
=== Summary ===
The first legs were played on 3 and 4 August, and the second legs were played on 9, 10 and 11 August 2022.

The winners of the ties advanced to the play-off round of their respective path. The losers were eliminated from European competitions for the season.

Team 1	Agg.	Team 2	1st leg	2nd leg
Champions Path
Víkingur Reykjavík (Iceland)	2–4	(Poland) Lech Poznań	1–0	1–4 (a.e.t.)
RFS (Latvia)	4–2	(Malta) Hibernians	1–1	3–1
Ballkani (Kosovo)	4–4 (4–3 p)	(Faroe Islands) KÍ	3–2	1–2 (a.e.t.)
Zrinjski Mostar (Bosnia and Herzegovina)	2–1	(Kazakhstan) Tobol	1–0	1–1
Shakhtyor Soligorsk (Belarus)	0–1	(Romania) CFR Cluj	0–0	0–1
Main Path
Spartak Trnava (Slovakia)	0–3	(Poland) Raków Częstochowa	0–2	0–1
AIK (Sweden)	2–2 (3–2 p)	(North Macedonia) Shkëndija	1–1	1–1 (a.e.t.)
Viking (Norway)	5–2	(Republic of Ireland) Sligo Rovers	5–1	0–1
Breiðablik (Iceland)	1–6	(Turkey) İstanbul Başakşehir	1–3	0–3
KuPS (Finland)	0–5	(Switzerland) Young Boys	0–2	0–3
Paide Linnameeskond (Estonia)	0–5	(Belgium) Anderlecht	0–2	0–3
Viborg (Denmark)	5–1	(Faroe Islands) B36	3–0	2–1
Hajduk Split (Croatia)	3–2	(Portugal) Vitória de Guimarães	3–1	0–1
Brøndby (Denmark)	2–2 (1–3 p)	(Switzerland) Basel	1–0	1–2 (a.e.t.)
Lillestrøm (Norway)	1–5	(Belgium) Antwerp	1–3	0–2
CSKA Sofia (Bulgaria)	2–1	(Republic of Ireland) St Patrick's Athletic	0–1	2–0
Dundee United (Scotland)	1–7	(Netherlands) AZ	1–0	0–7
APOEL (Cyprus)	1–0	(Kazakhstan) Kyzylzhar	1–0	0–0
DAC Dunajská Streda (Slovakia)	0–2	(Romania) FCSB	0–1	0–1
Riga (Latvia)	1–5	(Portugal) Gil Vicente	1–1	0–4
Wolfsberger AC (Austria)	4–0	(Malta) Gżira United	0–0	4–0
Maccabi Tel Aviv (Israel)	3–2	(Greece) Aris	2–0	1–2
Molde (Norway)	4–2	(Hungary) Kisvárda	3–0	1–2
Neftçi (Azerbaijan)	2–3	(Austria) Rapid Wien	2–1	0–2 (a.e.t.)
Lugano (Switzerland)	1–5	(Israel) Hapoel Be'er Sheva	0–2	1–3
Hamrun Spartans (Malta)	2–2 (4–1 p) (Note: Order of legs reversed after original draw.)	(Bulgaria) Levski Sofia	0–1	2–1 (a.e.t.)
Čukarički (Serbia)	2–7	(Netherlands) Twente	1–3	1–4
Zorya Luhansk (Ukraine)	1–3	(Romania) Universitatea Craiova	1–0	0–3
Vaduz (Liechtenstein)	5–3	(Turkey) Konyaspor	1–1	4–2
Sepsi OSK (Romania)	2–6	(Sweden) Djurgårdens IF	1–3	1–3
MOL Fehérvár (Hungary)	7–1	(Moldova) Petrocub Hîncești	5–0	2–1
Slavia Prague (Czech Republic)	3–1	(Greece) Panathinaikos	2–0	1–1

=== Champions Path matches ===
4 August 2022
20:45 (18:45 UTC+0)

Víkingur Reykjavík (Iceland)	1–0	(Poland) Lech Poznań
Sigurpálsson 45'	Report

Víkingsvöllur, Reykjavík
Attendance: 1,023
Referee: Juxhin Xhaja (Albania)
11 August 2022
20:30

Lech Poznań (Poland)	4–1 (a.e.t.)	(Iceland) Víkingur Reykjavík
Ishak 32'; Velde 44'; Marchwiński 96'; Sousa 119'	Report	Djurić 90+5'

Stadion Poznań, Poznań
Attendance: 12,555
Referee: Julian Weinberger (Austria)

Lech Poznań won 4–2 on aggregate.

4 August 2022
18:00 (19:00 UTC+3)

RFS (Latvia)	1–1	(Malta) Hibernians
Ilić 85'	Report	Vella 39'

Daugava Stadium, Riga (Note: RFS played their home matches at the Daugava Stadium, instead of their regular stadium, LNK Sports Parks, which did not meet UEFA requirements.)
Attendance: 1,911
Referee: Genc Nuza (Kosovo)
11 August 2022
20:00

Hibernians (Malta)	1–3	(Latvia) RFS
J. Grech 71' (pen.)	Report	Mareš 45' (pen.); Ilić 78', 87'

Centenary Stadium, Ta' Qali (Note: Hibernians played their home matches at the Centenary Stadium in Ta' Qali, instead of their regular stadium, the Hibernians Stadium, in Paola, which did not meet UEFA requirements.)
Attendance: 1,215
Referee: Kateryna Monzul (Ukraine)

RFS won 4–2 on aggregate.

4 August 2022
20:00

Ballkani (Kosovo)	3–2	(Faroe Islands) KÍ
Gripshi 30'; Korenica 41'; Rrahmani 50'	Report	Klettskarð 69', 88'

Fadil Vokrri Stadium, Pristina (Note: Ballkani played their home matches at the Fadil Vokrri Stadium in Pristina, instead of their regular stadium, the Theranda City Stadium, Suva Reka, which did not meet UEFA requirements.)
Attendance: 3,500
Referee: Espen Eskås (Norway)
11 August 2022
20:00 (19:00 UTC+1)

KÍ (Faroe Islands)	2–1 (a.e.t.)	(Kosovo) Ballkani
Mikkelsen 56'; Da Silva 89'	Report	Krasniqi 83'
Penalties
Bjartalíð (penalty scored); Holvad (penalty missed); Poulsen (penalty scored); Danielsen (penalty missed); J. Andreasen (penalty scored)	3–4	(penalty scored) Ar. Thaqi; (penalty scored) Dellova; (penalty scored) Gripshi; (penalty missed) Zyba; (penalty scored) Emërllahu

Tórsvøllur, Tórshavn (Note: KÍ Klaksvík played their third qualifying round home match at Tórsvøllur in Tórshavn, instead of their regular stadium, Við Djúpumýrar in Klaksvík.)
Attendance: 1,666
Referee: Goga Kikacheishvili (Georgia)

4–4 on aggregate; Ballkani won 4–3 on penalties.

4 August 2022
21:00

Zrinjski Mostar (Bosnia and Herzegovina)	1–0	(Kazakhstan) Tobol
Janković 76'	Report

Stadion pod Bijelim Brijegom, Mostar
Attendance: 4,754
Referee: António Nobre (Portugal)
11 August 2022
16:00 (20:00 UTC+6)

Tobol (Kazakhstan)	1–1	(Bosnia and Herzegovina) Zrinjski Mostar
Déblé 53'	Report	Ćuže 34'

Central Stadium, Kostanay
Attendance: 6,000
Referee: Nathan Verboomen (Belgium)

Zrinjski Mostar won 2–1 on aggregate.

4 August 2022
19:00 (20:00 UTC+3)

Shakhtyor Soligorsk (Belarus)	0–0	(Romania) CFR Cluj
	Report

New Sakarya Stadium, Adapazarı, Turkey (Note: Due to the country's involvement in the Russian invasion of Ukraine, Belarusian teams were required to play their home matches at neutral venues and behind closed doors until further notice.)
Attendance: 0
Referee: Ioannis Papadopoulos (Greece)
11 August 2022
19:00 (20:00 UTC+3)

CFR Cluj (Romania)	1–0	(Belarus) Shakhtyor Soligorsk
Betancor 37'	Report

Stadionul Dr. Constantin Rădulescu, Cluj
Attendance: 6,700
Referee: Morten Krogh (Denmark)

CFR Cluj won 1–0 on aggregate.

=== Main Path matches ===
4 August 2022
18:30

Spartak Trnava (Slovakia)	0–2	(Poland) Raków Częstochowa
	Report	Ivi 30', 45+1' (pen.)

Anton Malatinský Stadium, Trnava
Attendance: 8,720
Referee: Igor Pajač (Croatia)
11 August 2022
18:00

Raków Częstochowa (Poland)	1–0	(Slovakia) Spartak Trnava
Kocherhin 68'	Report

Miejski Stadion Piłkarski "Raków", Częstochowa
Attendance: 5,434
Referee: Allard Lindhout (Netherlands)

Raków Częstochowa won 3–0 on aggregate.

4 August 2022
19:00

AIK (Sweden)	1–1	(North Macedonia) Shkëndija
Guidetti 17'	Report	Hasani 1'

Friends Arena, Solna
Attendance: 15,692
Referee: Bram Van Driessche (Belgium)
11 August 2022
20:00

Shkëndija (North Macedonia)	1–1 (a.e.t.)	(Sweden) AIK
Hasani 22' (pen.)	Report	Ayari 56'
Penalties
Stojanovski (penalty scored); Dita (penalty missed); Doriev (penalty missed); Cake (penalty scored); Hasani (penalty missed)	2–3	(penalty missed) Larsson; (penalty scored) Hussein; (penalty scored) Stefanelli; (penalty scored) Björnström; (penalty missed) Ring

Toše Proeski Arena, Skopje (Note: Shkëndija played their home matches at the Toše Proeski Arena in Skopje, instead of their regular stadium, the Ecolog Arena, in Tetovo, which did not meet UEFA requirements.)
Attendance: 4,304
Referee: Don Robertson (Scotland)

2–2 on aggregate; AIK won 3–2 on penalties.

4 August 2022
19:00

Viking (Norway)	5–1	(Republic of Ireland) Sligo Rovers
Tripić 4'; Friðjónsson 8'; Traoré 53'; Sandberg 60'; Austbø 86'	Report	Cawley 89' (pen.)

Viking Stadion, Stavanger
Attendance: 11,645
Referee: Radu Petrescu (Romania)
11 August 2022
20:00 (19:00 UTC+1)

Sligo Rovers (Republic of Ireland)	1–0	(Norway) Viking
Fitzgerald 44'	Report

The Showgrounds, Sligo
Attendance: 3,879
Referee: Novak Simović (Serbia)

Viking won 5–2 on aggregate.

4 August 2022
20:45 (18:45 UTC+0)

Breiðablik (Iceland)	1–3	(Turkey) İstanbul Başakşehir
V. Einarsson 63'	Report	Aleksić 38', 90+2'; Türüç 52'

Kópavogsvöllur, Kópavogur
Attendance: 1,283
Referee: Petri Viljanen (Finland)
11 August 2022
19:45 (20:45 UTC+3)

İstanbul Başakşehir (Turkey)	3–0	(Iceland) Breiðablik
Okaka 44'; Touba 74'; Aleksić 84'	Report

Fatih Terim Stadium, Istanbul
Attendance: 2,401
Referee: Tamás Bognár (Hungary)

İstanbul Başakşehir won 6–1 on aggregate.

4 August 2022
18:00 (19:00 UTC+3)

KuPS (Finland)	0–2	(Switzerland) Young Boys
	Report	Nsame 25' (pen.); Elia 40'

Veritas Stadium, Turku
Attendance: 1,521
Referee: Gergő Bogár (Hungary)
11 August 2022
21:00

Young Boys (Switzerland)	3–0	(Finland) KuPS
Nsame 3', 57'; Sierro 35'	Report

Stadion Wankdorf, Bern
Attendance: 14,059
Referee: Stéphanie Frappart (France)

Young Boys won 5–0 on aggregate.

4 August 2022
18:45 (19:45 UTC+3)

Paide Linnameeskond (Estonia)	0–2	(Belgium) Anderlecht
	Report	Refaelov 10'; F. Silva 40'

Lilleküla Stadium, Tallinn (Note: Paide Linnameeskond played their home matches at the Pärnu Rannastaadion in Pärnu and the Lilleküla Stadium in Tallinn, instead of their regular stadium, the Paide linnastaadion, in Paide, which did not meet UEFA requirements.)
Attendance: 7,506
Referee: David Fuxman (Israel)
11 August 2022
20:00

Anderlecht (Belgium)	3–0	(Estonia) Paide Linnameeskond
Fábio Silva 62'; Murillo 71', 75'	Report

Constant Vanden Stock Stadium, Brussels
Attendance: 11,235
Referee: Giorgi Kruashvili (Georgia)

Anderlecht won 5–0 on aggregate.

3 August 2022
19:00

Viborg (Denmark)	3–0	(Faroe Islands) B36
Bonde 21' (pen.); Leemans 48'; Ndione 52'	Report

Viborg Stadion, Viborg
Attendance: 5,191
Referee: Henrik Nalbandyan (Armenia)
9 August 2022
20:00 (19:00 UTC+1)

B36 (Faroe Islands)	1–2	(Denmark) Viborg
Przybylski 79'	Report	Mortimer 64'; Jatta 86'

Tórsvøllur, Tórshavn
Attendance: 868
Referee: Pavel Orel (Czech Republic)

Viborg won 5–1 on aggregate.

4 August 2022
21:00

Hajduk Split (Croatia)	3–1	(Portugal) Vitória de Guimarães
Sahiti 67'; Melnjak 75'; Krovinović 87'	Report	Miguel Maga 61'

Stadion Poljud, Split
Attendance: 32,000
Referee: Mohammed Al-Hakim (Sweden)
10 August 2022
18:00 (17:00 UTC+1)

Vitória de Guimarães (Portugal)	1–0	(Croatia) Hajduk Split
Anderson 5'	Report

Estádio D. Afonso Henriques, Guimarães
Attendance: 15,214
Referee: Ali Palabıyık (Turkey)

Hajduk Split won 3–2 on aggregate.

4 August 2022
20:30

Brøndby (Denmark)	1–0	(Switzerland) Basel
Divković 74'	Report

Brøndby Stadium, Brøndbyvester
Attendance: 15,015
Referee: Filip Glova (Slovakia)
11 August 2022
19:15

Basel (Switzerland)	2–1 (a.e.t.)	(Denmark) Brøndby
Frei 40' (pen.); Zeqiri 45+5'	Report	Kvistgaarden 45+1'
Penalties
Diouf (penalty scored); Ndoye (penalty scored); Szalai (penalty missed); Males (penalty scored)	3–1	(penalty missed) Radošević; (penalty missed) Salech; (penalty scored) Greve; (penalty missed) Bjur

St. Jakob-Park, Basel
Attendance: 20,064
Referee: Christian Dingert (Germany)

2–2 on aggregate; Basel won 3–1 on penalties.

4 August 2022
19:00

Lillestrøm (Norway)	1–3	(Belgium) Antwerp
Knudsen 45+3'	Report	Almeida 5'; Nainggolan 50', 86'

Åråsen Stadion, Lillestrøm
Attendance: 4,927
Referee: Daniel Stefański (Poland)
11 August 2022
19:30

Antwerp (Belgium)	2–0	(Norway) Lillestrøm
Valencia 11'; Verstraete 69'	Report

Bosuilstadion, Antwerp
Attendance: 9,586
Referee: Duje Strukan (Croatia)

Antwerp won 5–1 on aggregate.

4 August 2022
19:00 (20:00 UTC+3)

CSKA Sofia (Bulgaria)	0–1	(Republic of Ireland) St Patrick's Athletic
	Report	Atakayi 87'

Vasil Levski National Stadium, Sofia (Note: CSKA Sofia played their home matches at the Vasil Levski National Stadium, instead of their regular venue, the Stadion Balgarska Armia, which did not meet UEFA requirements.)
Attendance: 7,048
Referee: Manuel Schüttengruber (Austria)
11 August 2022
20:45 (19:45 UTC+1)

St Patrick's Athletic (Republic of Ireland)	0–2	(Bulgaria) CSKA Sofia
	Report	Garcez 12'; Turitsov 81' (pen.)

Tallaght Stadium, Tallaght (Note: St Patrick's Athletic played their third qualifying round home match at Tallaght Stadium, instead of their regular venue, Richmond Park, which did not meet UEFA requirements.)
Attendance: 6,760
Referee: Horațiu Feșnic (Romania)

CSKA Sofia won 2–1 on aggregate.

4 August 2022
21:00 (20:00 UTC+1)

Dundee United (Scotland)	1–0	(Netherlands) AZ
Middleton 61'	Report

Tannadice Park, Dundee
Attendance: 10,181
Referee: Vítor Ferreira (Portugal)
11 August 2022
21:00

AZ (Netherlands)	7–0	(Scotland) Dundee United
Pavlidis 21', 36'; Reijnders 31', 41'; Evjen 44'; D. de Wit 46'; Lahdo 74'	Report

AFAS Stadion, Alkmaar
Attendance: 11,005
Referee: Antonio Mateu Lahoz (Spain)

AZ won 7–1 on aggregate.

4 August 2022
19:00 (20:00 UTC+3)

APOEL (Cyprus)	1–0	(Kazakhstan) Kyzylzhar
Efrem 27'	Report

GSP Stadium, Nicosia
Attendance: 12,630
Referee: Erik Lambrechts (Belgium)
11 August 2022
15:30 (19:30 UTC+6)

Kyzylzhar (Kazakhstan)	0–0	(Cyprus) APOEL
	Report

Astana Arena, Nur-Sultan (Note: Kyzylzhar played their home matches at the Astana Arena in Nur-Sultan, instead of their regular venue Karasai Stadium, Petropavl, which did not meet UEFA requirements.)
Attendance: 6,380
Referee: Daniel Siebert (Germany)

APOEL won 1–0 on aggregate.

3 August 2022
20:30

DAC Dunajská Streda (Slovakia)	0–1	(Romania) FCSB
	Report	Tamm 69'

MOL Aréna, Dunajská Streda
Attendance: 8,424
Referee: Rade Obrenovič (Slovenia)
11 August 2022
19:30 (20:30 UTC+3)

FCSB (Romania)	1–0	(Slovakia) DAC Dunajská Streda
Cordea 28'	Report

Arena Națională, Bucharest
Attendance: 40,457
Referee: Aliyar Aghayev (Azerbaijan)

FCSB won 2–0 on aggregate.

3 August 2022
19:00 (20:00 UTC+3)

Riga (Latvia)	1–1	(Portugal) Gil Vicente
Aurélio 18'	Report	Boselli 63'

Skonto Stadium, Riga
Attendance: 7,100
Referee: Jakob Kehlet (Denmark)
11 August 2022
21:00 (20:00 UTC+1)

Gil Vicente (Portugal)	4–0	(Latvia) Riga
Ngonda 16' (o.g.); Villodres 22'; Navarro 45+1', 76' (pen.)	Report

Estádio Cidade de Barcelos, Barcelos
Attendance: 7,596
Referee: Mykola Balakin (Ukraine)

Gil Vicente won 5–1 on aggregate.

3 August 2022
19:30

Wolfsberger AC (Austria)	0–0	(Malta) Gżira United
	Report

Wörthersee Stadion, Klagenfurt (Note: Wolfsberger AC are playing their home matches at the Wörthersee Stadion, in Klagenfurt, instead of their regular venue, the Lavanttal-Arena, in Wolfsberg, which did not meet UEFA requirements.)
Attendance: 2,114
Referee: Urs Schnyder (Switzerland)
9 August 2022
18:00

Gżira United (Malta)	0–4	(Austria) Wolfsberger AC
	Report	Baribo 12'; Baumgartner 33'; Röcher 59' (pen.); Boakye 84'

Centenary Stadium, Ta' Qali
Attendance: 786
Referee: Nick Walsh (Scotland)

Wolfsberger AC won 4–0 on aggregate.

4 August 2022
19:00 (20:00 UTC+3)

Maccabi Tel Aviv (Israel)	2–0	(Greece) Aris
Jovanović 29'; Zahavi 84'	Report

Bloomfield Stadium, Tel Aviv
Attendance: 21,204
Referee: Dennis Higler (Netherlands)
11 August 2022
20:00 (21:00 UTC+3)

Aris (Greece)	2–1	(Israel) Maccabi Tel Aviv
Gray 60' (pen.); Doukouré 81'	Report	Zahavi 74'

Kleanthis Vikelidis Stadium, Thessaloniki
Attendance: 16,762
Referee: John Beaton (Scotland)

Maccabi Tel Aviv won 3–2 on aggregate.

4 August 2022
19:00

Molde (Norway)	3–0	(Hungary) Kisvárda
Hussain 63'; Fofana 81'; Linnes 82'	Report

Aker Stadion, Molde
Attendance: 3,404
Referee: Igor Stojchevski (North Macedonia)
11 August 2022
21:00

Kisvárda (Hungary)	2–1	(Norway) Molde
Asani 14', 29'	Report	Mannsverk 69'

Várkerti Stadion, Kisvárda
Attendance: 2,548
Referee: Alain Durieux (Luxembourg)

Molde won 4–2 on aggregate.

4 August 2022
19:00 (21:00 UTC+4)

Neftçi (Azerbaijan)	2–1	(Austria) Rapid Wien
Jaber 44'; Saief 60'	Report	Burgstaller 90+5'

Bakcell Arena, Baku
Attendance: 9,800
Referee: Dario Bel (Croatia)
11 August 2022
20:30

Rapid Wien (Austria)	2–0 (a.e.t.)	(Azerbaijan) Neftçi
Grüll 66'; Druijf 112'	Report

Allianz Stadion, Vienna
Attendance: 14,200
Referee: Rohit Saggi (Norway)

Rapid Wien won 3–2 on aggregate.

4 August 2022
20:00

Lugano (Switzerland)	0–2	(Israel) Hapoel Be'er Sheva
	Report	Yosefi 39'; Selmani 85'

Cornaredo Stadium, Lugano
Attendance: 3,369
Referee: Michael Fabbri (Italy)
11 August 2022
19:15 (20:15 UTC+3)

Hapoel Be'er Sheva (Israel)	3–1	(Switzerland) Lugano
Miguel Vitor 51'; Hajdari 61' (o.g.); Hatuel 85'	Report	Doumbia 73' (pen.)

Netanya Stadium, Netanya (Note: Hapoel Be'er Sheva played their home match at the Netanya Stadium, instead of their regular stadium, Turner Stadium, Be'er Sheva, due to safety concerns relating to the 2022 Israel–Gaza conflict.)
Attendance: 4,798
Referee: Juan Martínez Munuera (Spain)

Hapoel Be'er Sheva won 5–1 on aggregate.

4 August 2022
19:30

Hamrun Spartans (Malta)	0–1	(Bulgaria) Levski Sofia
	Report	Krastev 90+5'

National Stadium, Ta' Qali (Note: Hamrun Spartans are playing their home matches at the Centenary Stadium and the National Stadium in Ta' Qali, instead of their regular stadium, the Victor Tedesco Stadium, Hamrun, which did not meet UEFA requirements.)
Attendance: 3,135
Referee: Willy Delajod (France)
11 August 2022
20:00 (21:00 UTC+3)

Levski Sofia (Bulgaria)	1–2 (a.e.t.)	(Malta) Hamrun Spartans
Tsunami 90+1'	Report	Guillaumier 78'; Camenzuli 90+2'
Penalties
Petkov (penalty scored); Tsunami (penalty missed); Krastev (penalty missed)	1–4	(penalty scored) Freitas; (penalty scored) Montebello; (penalty scored) Guillaumier; (penalty scored) Fedele

Stadion Georgi Asparuhov, Sofia
Attendance: 16,480
Referee: István Kovács (Romania)

2–2 on aggregate; Hamrun Spartans won 4–1 on penalties.

4 August 2022
20:00

Čukarički (Serbia)	1–3	(Netherlands) Twente
Kovač 59'	Report	Rots 8'; Vlap 31'; Brenet 43'

Partizan Stadium, Belgrade (Note: Čukarički played their third qualifying round home match at the Partizan Stadium, instead of their regular venue, the Čukarički Stadium)
Attendance: 2,374
Referee: Harald Lechner (Austria)
11 August 2022
19:00

Twente (Netherlands)	4–1	(Serbia) Čukarički
Pröpper 16'; Vlap 34'; Tzolis 84', 90+2'	Report	Adžić 7'

De Grolsch Veste, Enschede
Attendance: 22,500
Referee: Kristo Tohver (Estonia)

Twente won 7–2 on aggregate.

4 August 2022
19:30

Zorya Luhansk (Ukraine)	1–0	(Romania) Universitatea Craiova
Nahnoynyi 56'	Report

Arena Lublin, Lublin, Poland (Note: Due to the Russian invasion of Ukraine, Ukrainian teams are required to play their home matches at neutral venues until further notice.)
Attendance: 782
Referee: Georgi Davidov (Bulgaria)
11 August 2022
19:30 (20:30 UTC+3)

Universitatea Craiova (Romania)	3–0	(Ukraine) Zorya Luhansk
R. Silva 5'; Baiaram 53'; Crețu 57'	Report

Stadionul Ion Oblemenco, Craiova
Attendance: 15,079
Referee: Matej Jug (Slovenia)

Universitatea Craiova won 3–1 on aggregate.

4 August 2022
20:00

Vaduz (Liechtenstein)	1–1	(Turkey) Konyaspor
Sasere 72'	Report	Demir 88'

Rheinpark Stadion, Vaduz
Attendance: 2,032
Referee: Manfredas Lukjančukas (Lithuania)
11 August 2022
19:00 (20:00 UTC+3)

Konyaspor (Turkey)	2–4	(Liechtenstein) Vaduz
Guilherme 18' (pen.); Hadžiahmetović 90+5'	Report	Gasser 28', 89'; Sutter 31'; Cicek 67'

Konya Metropolitan Municipality Stadium, Konya
Attendance: 22,723
Referee: Guillermo Cuadra Fernández (Spain)

Vaduz won 5–3 on aggregate.

4 August 2022
20:00 (21:00 UTC+3)

Sepsi OSK (Romania)	1–3	(Sweden) Djurgårdens IF
Tudorie 79' (pen.)	Report	Edvardsen 26' (pen.); Asoro 31', 54'

Stadionul Sepsi Arena, Sfântu Gheorghe
Attendance: 6,632
Referee: Paweł Raczkowski (Poland)
11 August 2022
19:00

Djurgårdens IF (Sweden)	3–1	(Romania) Sepsi OSK
Finndell 12'; Asoro 23', 71'	Report	Matei 8'

Tele2 Arena, Stockholm
Attendance: 19,280
Referee: Sascha Stegemann (Germany)

Djurgårdens IF won 6–2 on aggregate.

4 August 2022
20:55

MOL Fehérvár (Hungary)	5–0	(Moldova) Petrocub Hîncești
Dárdai 20'; Kodro 23' (pen.); Stopira 35'; Petryak 66'; Zivzivadze 88' (pen.)	Report

MOL Aréna Sóstó, Székesfehérvár
Attendance: 3,365
Referee: Vilhjálmur Alvar Þórarinsson (Iceland)
11 August 2022
19:00 (20:00 UTC+3)

Petrocub Hîncești (Moldova)	1–2	(Hungary) MOL Fehérvár
Sandu 34' (pen.)	Report	Zivzivadze 31', 39'

Zimbru Stadium, Chișinău (Note: Petrocub Hîncești played their home matches at the Zimbru Stadium in Chișinău, instead of their regular stadium, the Stadionul Municipal, in Hîncești, which did not meet UEFA requirements.)
Attendance: 4,702
Referee: Jérôme Brisard (France)

MOL Fehérvár won 7–1 on aggregate.

4 August 2022
19:00

Slavia Prague (Czech Republic)	2–0	(Greece) Panathinaikos
Schranz 45+2'; Usor 56'	Report

Fortuna Arena, Prague
Attendance: 17,314
Referee: Ruddy Buquet (France)
11 August 2022
19:30 (20:30 UTC+3)

Panathinaikos (Greece)	1–1	(Czech Republic) Slavia Prague
Šporar 58'	Report	Jurečka 90+5'

Leoforos Alexandras Stadium, Athens
Attendance: 13,123
Referee: Peter Bankes (England)

Slavia Prague won 3–1 on aggregate.

== Play-off round ==
=== Summary ===
The first legs were played on 17 and 18 August, and the second legs were played on 23 and 25 August 2022.

The winners of the ties advanced to the group stage. The losers were eliminated from European competitions for the season.

Team 1	Agg.	Team 2	1st leg	2nd leg
Champions Path
Maribor (Slovenia)	0–1	(Romania) CFR Cluj	0–0	0–1
RFS (Latvia)	3–3 (4–2 p)	(Northern Ireland) Linfield	2–2	1–1 (a.e.t.)
Lech Poznań (Poland)	3–1	(Luxembourg) F91 Dudelange	2–0	1–1
Shkupi (North Macedonia)	1–3	(Kosovo) Ballkani	1–2	0–1
Zrinjski Mostar (Bosnia and Herzegovina)	2–2 (5–6 p)	(Slovakia) Slovan Bratislava	1–0	1–2 (a.e.t.)
Main Path
CSKA Sofia (Bulgaria)	1–2	(Switzerland) Basel	1–0	0–2
Vaduz (Liechtenstein)	2–1	(Austria) Rapid Wien	1–1	1–0
Raków Częstochowa (Poland)	2–3	(Czech Republic) Slavia Prague	2–1	0–2 (a.e.t.)
Djurgårdens IF (Sweden)	5–3 (Note: Order of legs reversed after original draw.)	(Cyprus) APOEL	3–0	2–3
Maccabi Tel Aviv (Israel)	1–2	(France) Nice	1–0	0–2 (a.e.t.)
Universitatea Craiova (Romania)	2–2 (3–4 p)	(Israel) Hapoel Be'er Sheva	1–1	1–1 (a.e.t.)
İstanbul Başakşehir (Turkey)	4–2	(Belgium) Antwerp	1–1	3–1
FCSB (Romania)	4–3	(Norway) Viking	1–2	3–1
Partizan (Serbia)	7–4	(Malta) Hamrun Spartans	4–1	3–3
Fiorentina (Italy)	2–1	(Netherlands) Twente	2–1	0–0
Villarreal (Spain)	6–2	(Croatia) Hajduk Split	4–2	2–0
1. FC Köln (Germany)	4–2	(Hungary) MOL Fehérvár	1–2	3–0
West Ham United (England)	6–1	(Denmark) Viborg	3–1	3–0
Young Boys (Switzerland)	1–1 (1–3 p)	(Belgium) Anderlecht	0–1	1–0 (a.e.t.)
Slovácko (Czech Republic)	4–0	(Sweden) AIK	3–0	1–0
Molde (Norway)	4–1	(Austria) Wolfsberger AC	0–1	4–0
AZ (Netherlands)	6–1	(Portugal) Gil Vicente	4–0	2–1

=== Champions Path matches ===
18 August 2022
20:15

Maribor (Slovenia)	0–0	(Romania) CFR Cluj
	Report

Ljudski vrt, Maribor
Attendance: 4,500
Referee: Pavel Orel (Czech Republic)
25 August 2022
19:00 (20:00 UTC+3)

CFR Cluj (Romania)	1–0	(Slovenia) Maribor
Cvek 90'	Report

Stadionul Dr. Constantin Rădulescu, Cluj
Attendance: 9,852
Referee: John Beaton (Scotland)

CFR Cluj won 1–0 on aggregate.

18 August 2022
19:00 (20:00 UTC+3)

RFS (Latvia)	2–2	(Northern Ireland) Linfield
Friesenbichler 88'; Lipušček 90+5'	Report	Fallon 38'; Cooper 71'

Daugava Stadium, Riga
Attendance: 4,710
Referee: Aliyar Aghayev (Azerbaijan)
25 August 2022
20:45 (19:45 UTC+1)

Linfield (Northern Ireland)	1–1 (a.e.t.)	(Latvia) RFS
McClean 104'	Report	Callacher 120+1' (o.g.)
Penalties
M. Clarke (penalty missed); Devine (penalty missed); Vertainen (penalty scored); McClean (penalty scored)	2–4	(penalty scored) Friesenbichler; (penalty scored) Ilić; (penalty scored) Mareš; (penalty scored) Panić

Windsor Park, Belfast
Attendance: 4,742
Referee: Matej Jug (Slovenia)

3–3 on aggregate; RFS won 4–2 on penalties.

18 August 2022
20:30

Lech Poznań (Poland)	2–0	(Luxembourg) F91 Dudelange
Velde 6'; Ishak 66'	Report

Stadion Poznań, Poznań
Attendance: 9,150
Referee: Manfredas Lukjančukas (Lithuania)
25 August 2022
20:30

F91 Dudelange (Luxembourg)	1–1	(Poland) Lech Poznań
Kirch 36'	Report	Pereira 60'

Stade de Luxembourg, Luxembourg City (Note: F91 Dudelange will play their home match at the Stade de Luxembourg, in Luxembourg City, instead of their regular stadium, the Stade Jos Nosbaum, in Dudelange, which did not meet UEFA requirements.)
Attendance: 1,935
Referee: Nikola Dabanović (Montenegro)

Lech Poznań won 3–1 on aggregate.

18 August 2022
21:00

Shkupi (North Macedonia)	1–2	(Kosovo) Ballkani
Adetunji 19'	Report	Rrahmani 23'; Korenica 67'

Toše Proeski Arena, Skopje (Note: Shkupi played their home match at the Toše Proeski Arena, instead of their regular stadium, the Čair Stadium, which did not meet UEFA requirements.)
Attendance: 8,430
Referee: Ivar Orri Kristjansson (Iceland)
25 August 2022
20:00

Ballkani (Kosovo)	1–0	(North Macedonia) Shkupi
Korenica 69'	Report

Fadil Vokrri Stadium, Pristina
Attendance: 12,000
Referee: István Vad (Hungary)

Ballkani won 3–1 on aggregate.

18 August 2022
20:00

Zrinjski Mostar (Bosnia and Herzegovina)	1–0	(Slovakia) Slovan Bratislava
Bilbija 89'	Report

Stadion pod Bijelim Brijegom, Mostar
Attendance: 5,100
Referee: Julian Weinberger (Austria)
25 August 2022
20:30

Slovan Bratislava (Slovakia)	2–1 (a.e.t.)	(Bosnia and Herzegovina) Zrinjski Mostar
Ramírez 67', 120+2'	Report	Savić 103'
Penalties
Hrnčár (penalty scored); Medved (penalty scored); Mustafić (penalty scored); Abena (penalty scored); Ramírez (penalty scored); Kashia (penalty missed); Čavrić (penalty scored)	6–5	(penalty scored) Bilbija; (penalty scored) Kamenar; (penalty scored) Savić; (penalty scored) Maglica; (penalty scored) Jakovljević; (penalty missed) Barišić; (penalty missed) Malekinušić

Tehelné pole, Bratislava
Attendance: 14,333
Referee: Mohammed Al-Hakim (Sweden)

2–2 on aggregate; Slovan Bratislava won 6–5 on penalties.

=== Main Path matches ===
18 August 2022
19:00 (20:00 UTC+3)

CSKA Sofia (Bulgaria)	1–0	(Switzerland) Basel
López 71' (o.g.)	Report

Vasil Levski National Stadium, Sofia
Attendance: 15,364
Referee: Duje Strukan (Croatia)
25 August 2022
19:00

Basel (Switzerland)	2–0	(Bulgaria) CSKA Sofia
Frei 66'; Lang 84'	Report

St. Jakob-Park, Basel
Attendance: 18,469
Referee: António Nobre (Portugal)

Basel won 2–1 on aggregate.

18 August 2022
20:00

Vaduz (Liechtenstein)	1–1	(Austria) Rapid Wien
Ulrich 10'	Report	Druijf 53'

Rheinpark Stadion, Vaduz
Attendance: 3,497
Referee: Kristo Tohver (Estonia)
25 August 2022
21:00

Rapid Wien (Austria)	0–1	(Liechtenstein) Vaduz
	Report	Cicek 22'

Allianz Stadion, Vienna
Attendance: 15,100
Referee: Rade Obrenovič (Slovenia)

Vaduz won 2–1 on aggregate.

18 August 2022
18:00

Raków Częstochowa (Poland)	2–1	(Czech Republic) Slavia Prague
Ivi 29'; Tudor 61'	Report	Holeš 60'

Miejski Stadion Piłkarski "Raków", Częstochowa
Attendance: 5,500
Referee: Rohit Saggi (Norway)
25 August 2022
19:00

Slavia Prague (Czech Republic)	2–0 (a.e.t.)	(Poland) Raków Częstochowa
Usor 62'; Schranz 120+2'	Report

Fortuna Arena, Prague
Attendance: 19,370
Referee: Craig Pawson (England)

Slavia Prague won 3–2 on aggregate.

17 August 2022
18:45

Djurgårdens IF (Sweden)	3–0	(Cyprus) APOEL
Edvardsen 9'; Ekdal 54'; Wikheim 65'	Report

Tele2 Arena, Stockholm
Attendance: 19,122
Referee: Juxhin Xhaja (Albania)
23 August 2022
18:00 (19:00 UTC+3)

APOEL (Cyprus)	3–2	(Sweden) Djurgårdens IF
Maglica 7'; Blum 23'; Marquinhos 74'	Report	Andersson 68'; Asoro 90+1'

GSP Stadium, Nicosia
Attendance: 12,824
Referee: Roi Reinshreiber (Israel)

Djurgårdens IF won 5–3 on aggregate.

18 August 2022
19:00 (20:00 UTC+3)

Maccabi Tel Aviv (Israel)	1–0	(France) Nice
Perica 74'	Report

Bloomfield Stadium, Tel Aviv
Attendance: 26,871
Referee: Allard Lindhout (Netherlands)
25 August 2022
20:00

Nice (France)	2–0 (a.e.t.)	(Israel) Maccabi Tel Aviv
Claude-Maurice 25'; Beka Beka 113'	Report

Allianz Riviera, Nice
Attendance: 20,117
Referee: Sascha Stegemann (Germany)

Nice won 2–1 on aggregate.

18 August 2022
19:30 (20:30 UTC+3)

Universitatea Craiova (Romania)	1–1	(Israel) Hapoel Be'er Sheva
Ivan 75' (pen.)	Report	Hatuel 70'

Stadionul Municipal, Drobeta-Turnu Severin (Note: Universitatea Craiova played their play-off round home match at the Stadionul Municipal, in Drobeta-Turnu Severin, instead of their regular stadium, the Stadionul Ion Oblemenco, in Craiova.)
Attendance: 10,127
Referee: Nick Walsh (Scotland)
25 August 2022
19:00 (20:00 UTC+3)

Hapoel Be'er Sheva (Israel)	1–1 (a.e.t.)	(Romania) Universitatea Craiova
Hemed 105+1'	Report	Roguljić 105'
Penalties
Suleymanov (penalty scored); Keltjens (penalty scored); Lopes (penalty scored); Dadia (penalty scored)	4–3	(penalty scored) Roguljić; (penalty missed) Ivan; (penalty scored) Nistor; (penalty scored) Găman; (penalty missed) Bancu

Turner Stadium, Be'er Sheva
Attendance: 14,701
Referee: Erik Lambrechts (Belgium)

2–2 on aggregate; Hapoel Be'er Sheva won 4–3 on penalties.

18 August 2022
19:45 (20:45 UTC+3)

İstanbul Başakşehir (Turkey)	1–1	(Belgium) Antwerp
Chouiar 54'	Report	Almeida 88'

Fatih Terim Stadium, Istanbul
Attendance: 3,450
Referee: Jérôme Brisard (France)
25 August 2022
20:45

Antwerp (Belgium)	1–3	(Turkey) İstanbul Başakşehir
Frey 56' (pen.)	Report	Özcan 8'; Okaka 58'; Aleksić 83'

Bosuilstadion, Antwerp
Attendance: 12,955
Referee: Manuel Schüttengruber (Austria)

İstanbul Başakşehir won 4–2 on aggregate.

18 August 2022
20:30 (21:30 UTC+3)

FCSB (Romania)	1–2	(Norway) Viking
Coman 3'	Report	Kabran 5'; Bjørshol 35'

Arena Națională, Bucharest
Attendance: 30,134
Referee: Giorgi Kruashvili (Georgia)
25 August 2022
19:00

Viking (Norway)	1–3	(Romania) FCSB
Tripić 26' (pen.)	Report	Edjouma 2'; Cordea 54'; Radunović 90+4' (pen.)

Viking Stadion, Stavanger
Attendance: 14,104
Referee: Tamás Bognár (Hungary)

FCSB won 4–3 on aggregate.

18 August 2022
21:00

Partizan (Serbia)	4–1	(Malta) Hamrun Spartans
Gomes 15'; Urošević 25'; Diabaté 33'; Andrade 77'	Report	Guillaumier 52'

Partizan Stadium, Belgrade
Attendance: 5,502
Referee: Filip Glova (Slovakia)
25 August 2022
20:00

Hamrun Spartans (Malta)	3–3	(Serbia) Partizan
Prša 27'; Freitas 82' (pen.); Fedele 90+1' (pen.)	Report	Gomes 34', 78'; Urošević 72'

National Stadium, Ta' Qali
Attendance: 3,269
Referee: Jakob Kehlet (Denmark)

Partizan won 7–4 on aggregate.

18 August 2022
21:00

Fiorentina (Italy)	2–1	(Netherlands) Twente
González 2'; Cabral 31'	Report	Černý 64'

Stadio Artemio Franchi, Florence
Attendance: 16,674
Referee: Daniel Stefański (Poland)
25 August 2022
19:00

Twente (Netherlands)	0–0	(Italy) Fiorentina
	Report

De Grolsch Veste, Enschede
Attendance: 29,500
Referee: Radu Petrescu (Romania)

Fiorentina won 2–1 on aggregate.

18 August 2022
20:45

Villarreal (Spain)	4–2	(Croatia) Hajduk Split
Morales 15', 36'; Livaja 19' (o.g.); Gerard 45+1'	Report	Biuk 2'; Fossati 85' (pen.)

Ciutat de València, Valencia (Note: Villarreal played their play-off round home match at the Estadi Ciutat de València, in Valencia, instead of their regular stadium, the Estadio de la Cerámica, in Villarreal.)
Attendance: 11,275
Referee: Aleksei Kulbakov (Belarus)
25 August 2022
21:00

Hajduk Split (Croatia)	0–2	(Spain) Villarreal
	Report	Pedraza 37'; Chukwueze 56'

Stadion Poljud, Split
Attendance: 30,000
Referee: Andris Treimanis (Latvia)

Villarreal won 6–2 on aggregate.

18 August 2022
20:30

1. FC Köln (Germany)	1–2	(Hungary) MOL Fehérvár
Dietz 14'	Report	Zivzivadze 32'; Dárdai 40'

RheinEnergieStadion, Cologne
Attendance: 44,000
Referee: Tiago Martins (Portugal)
25 August 2022
19:00

MOL Fehérvár (Hungary)	0–3	(Germany) 1. FC Köln
	Report	Hübers 10'; Skhiri 46'; Schindler 90+4'

MOL Aréna Sóstó, Székesfehérvár
Attendance: 10,411
Referee: Ali Palabıyık (Turkey)

1. FC Köln won 4–2 on aggregate.

18 August 2022
20:45 (19:45 UTC+1)

West Ham United (England)	3–1	(Denmark) Viborg
Scamacca 24'; Bowen 64'; Antonio 78'	Report	Bonde 69'

London Stadium, London
Attendance: 30,230
Referee: Marco Di Bello (Italy)
25 August 2022
19:00

Viborg (Denmark)	0–3	(England) West Ham United
	Report	Scamacca 22'; Benrahma 51'; Souček 64'

Viborg Stadion, Viborg
Attendance: 8,435
Referee: Harald Lechner (Austria)

West Ham United won 6–1 on aggregate.

18 August 2022
19:00

Young Boys (Switzerland)	0–1	(Belgium) Anderlecht
	Report	Delcroix 57'

Stadion Wankdorf, Bern
Attendance: 18,363
Referee: Aleksandar Stavrev (North Macedonia)
25 August 2022
20:00

Anderlecht (Belgium)	0–1 (a.e.t.)	(Switzerland) Young Boys
	Report	Elia 26'
Penalties
Hoedt (penalty scored); Stroeykens (penalty missed); Sadiki (penalty scored); Esposito (penalty scored)	3–1	(penalty scored) Rieder; (penalty missed) Rrudhani; (penalty missed) Imeri; (penalty missed) Lustenberger

Constant Vanden Stock Stadium, Brussels
Attendance: 14,393
Referee: Serhiy Boyko (Ukraine)

1–1 on aggregate; Anderlecht won 3–1 on penalties.

18 August 2022
19:00

Slovácko (Czech Republic)	3–0	(Sweden) AIK
Petržela 28'; Sinyavskiy 77'; Reinberk 81'	Report

Městský fotbalový stadion Miroslava Valenty, Uherské Hradiště
Attendance: 6,032
Referee: Horațiu Feșnic (Romania)
25 August 2022
19:00

AIK (Sweden)	0–1	(Czech Republic) Slovácko
	Report	Sinyavskiy 76'

Friends Arena, Solna
Attendance: 15,799
Referee: Donatas Rumšas (Lithuania)

Slovácko won 4–0 on aggregate.

18 August 2022
19:00

Molde (Norway)	0–1	(Austria) Wolfsberger AC
	Report	Baribo 22'

Aker Stadion, Molde
Attendance: 4,761
Referee: Anastasios Papapetrou (Greece)
25 August 2022
19:00

Wolfsberger AC (Austria)	0–4	(Norway) Molde
	Report	Breivik 6'; Mannsverk 34'; Brynhildsen 72', 90+3'

Wörthersee Stadion, Klagenfurt
Attendance: 3,105
Referee: Rob Harvey (Republic of Ireland)

Molde won 4–1 on aggregate.

18 August 2022
21:00

AZ (Netherlands)	4–0	(Portugal) Gil Vicente
D. de Wit 24'; Lahdo 78'; Pavlidis 85'; M. de Wit 89'	Report

AFAS Stadion, Alkmaar
Attendance: 11,211
Referee: Guillermo Cuadra Fernández (Spain)
25 August 2022
21:00 (20:00 UTC+1)

Gil Vicente (Portugal)	1–2	(Netherlands) AZ
Boselli 86'	Report	Evjen 60'; Reijnders 64'

Estádio Cidade de Barcelos, Barcelos
Attendance: 4,625
Referee: Fran Jović (Croatia)

AZ won 6–1 on aggregate.
