= 2022–23 UEFA Champions League qualifying =

European football tournament

2022–23 UEFA Champions League qualifying was the preliminary phase of the 2022–23 UEFA Champions League, prior to the competition proper. Qualification consisted of the qualifying phase (preliminary and first to third rounds) and the play-off round. It began on 21 June and ended on 24 August 2022.

A total of 52 teams competed in the qualifying system of the 2022–23 UEFA Champions League, with 42 teams in Champions Path and 10 teams in League Path. The six winners in the play-off round (four from Champions Path, two from League Path) advanced to the group stage, to join the 26 teams that enter in the group stage.

Times are CEST (UTC+2), as listed by UEFA (local times, if different, are in parentheses).

== Teams ==
=== Champions Path ===
The Champions Path included all league champions which did not qualify directly for the group stage, and consisted of the following rounds:

- Preliminary round (4 teams playing one-legged semi-finals and final): 4 teams which entered in this round.
- First qualifying round (30 teams): 29 teams which entered in this round, and 1 winner of the preliminary round.
- Second qualifying round (20 teams): 5 teams which entered in this round, and 15 winners of the first qualifying round.
- Third qualifying round (12 teams): 2 teams which entered in this round, and 10 winners of the second qualifying round.
- Play-off round (8 teams): 2 teams which entered in this round, and 6 winners of the third qualifying round.

All teams eliminated from the Champions Path entered either the Europa League or the Europa Conference League:

- The 3 losers of the preliminary round and 13 losers of the first qualifying round entered the Europa Conference League Champions Path second qualifying round.
- The 2 drawn losers of the first qualifying round entered the Europa Conference League Champions Path third qualifying round.
- The 10 losers of the second qualifying round entered the Europa League Champions Path third qualifying round
- The 6 losers of the third qualifying round entered the Europa League play-off round.
- The 4 losers of the play-off round entered the Europa League group stage.

Below are the participating teams of the Champions Path (with their 2022 UEFA club coefficients), grouped by their starting rounds.

Key to colours
Winners of play-off round advance to group stage
Losers of play-off round entered Europa League group stage
Losers of third qualifying round entered Europa League play-off round
Losers of second qualifying round entered Europa League third qualifying round
Drawn losers of the first qualifying round entered Europa Conference League third qualifying round
Losers of the preliminary round and first qualifying round entered Europa Conference League second qualifying round

Play-off round
Team	Coeff.
(Denmark) Copenhagen	40.500
(Turkey) Trabzonspor	5.500

Third qualifying round
Team	Coeff.
(Serbia) Red Star Belgrade	46.000
(Cyprus) Apollon Limassol	14.000

Second qualifying round
Team	Coeff.
(Croatia) Dinamo Zagreb	49.500
(Greece) Olympiacos	41.000
(Czech Republic) Viktoria Plzeň	31.000
(Israel) Maccabi Haifa	7.000
(Switzerland) Zürich	7.000

First qualifying round
Team	Coeff.
(Azerbaijan) Qarabağ	25.000
(Sweden) Malmö FF	23.500
(Bulgaria) Ludogorets Razgrad	23.000
(Moldova) Sheriff Tiraspol	22.500
(Romania) CFR Cluj	19.500
(Norway) Bodø/Glimt	17.000
(Hungary) Ferencváros	15.500
(Slovenia) Maribor	14.000
(Slovakia) Slovan Bratislava	13.000
(Finland) HJK	8.500
(Wales) The New Saints	8.500
(Luxembourg) F91 Dudelange	8.500
(Lithuania) Žalgiris	8.000
(Gibraltar) Lincoln Red Imps	7.250
(Republic of Ireland) Shamrock Rovers	7.000
(Northern Ireland) Linfield	7.000
(Bosnia and Herzegovina) Zrinjski Mostar	7.000
(Belarus) Shakhtyor Soligorsk	6.250
(Montenegro) Sutjeska	6.250
(Faroe Islands) KÍ	6.250
(Poland) Lech Poznań	6.000
(Malta) Hibernians	5.500
(Kazakhstan) Tobol	4.500
(North Macedonia) Shkupi	4.500
(Armenia) Pyunik	4.250
(Latvia) RFS	4.000
(Georgia (country)) Dinamo Batumi	3.250
(Albania) Tirana	2.750
(Kosovo) Ballkani	1.633

Preliminary round
Team	Coeff.
(Estonia) FCI Levadia	4.750
(San Marino) La Fiorita	4.000
(Andorra) Inter Club d'Escaldes	3.000
(Iceland) Víkingur Reykjavík	1.075

=== League Path ===
The League Path included all league non-champions which did not qualify directly for the group stage, and consisted of the following rounds:

- Second qualifying round (4 teams): 4 teams which entered in this round.
- Third qualifying round (8 teams): 6 teams which entered in this round, and 2 winners of the second qualifying round.
- Play-off round (4 teams): 4 winners of the third qualifying round.

All teams eliminated from the League Path entered the Europa League:

- The 2 losers of the second qualifying round entered the Main Path third qualifying round.
- The 4 losers of the third qualifying round and the 2 losers of the play-off round entered the group stage.

Below are the participating teams of the League Path (with their 2022 UEFA club coefficients), grouped by their starting rounds.

Key to colours
Winners of play-off round advance to group stage
Losers of play-off round entered Europa League group stage
Losers of third qualifying round entered Europa League group stage
Losers of second qualifying round entered Europa League third qualifying round

Third qualifying round
Team	Coeff.
(Portugal) Benfica	61.000
(Scotland) Rangers	50.250
(Netherlands) PSV Eindhoven	33.000
(France) Monaco	26.000
(Austria) Sturm Graz	7.770
(Belgium) Union Saint-Gilloise	6.120

Second qualifying round
Team	Coeff.
(Ukraine) Dynamo Kyiv	44.000
(Denmark) Midtjylland	19.000
(Turkey) Fenerbahçe	14.500
(Cyprus) AEK Larnaca	7.500

== Format ==
Each tie, apart from the preliminary round, was played over two legs, with each team playing one leg at home. The team that scored more goals on aggregate over the two legs advanced to the next round. If the aggregate score was level at the end of normal time of the second leg, extra time was played, and if the same number of goals were scored by both teams during extra time, the tie was decided by a penalty shoot-out.

In the preliminary round, the semi-finals and final were played as a single match hosted by one of the participating teams. If the score was level at the end of normal time, extra time was played, and if the same number of goals were scored by both teams during extra time, the tie was decided by a penalty shoot-out.

The 2022–23 season saw the video assistant referee (VAR) used for the first time during the qualification phase following its introduction in the third qualifying round.

In the draws for each round, teams were seeded based on their UEFA club coefficients at the beginning of the season, with the teams divided into seeded and unseeded pots containing the same number of teams. A seeded team was drawn against an unseeded team, with the order of legs (or the administrative "home" team in the preliminary round matches) in each tie decided by draw. As the identity of the winners of the previous round was not known at the time of the draws, the seeding was carried out under the assumption that the team with the higher coefficient of an undecided tie advanced to this round, which means if the team with the lower coefficient was to advance, it simply took the seeding of its opponent. Prior to the draws, UEFA formed "groups" in accordance with the principles set by the Club Competitions Committee, but they were purely for convenience of the draw and did not resemble any real groupings in the sense of the competition. Teams from associations with political conflicts as decided by UEFA should not be drawn into the same tie. After the draws, the order of legs of a tie could be reversed by UEFA due to scheduling or venue conflicts.

== Schedule ==
The schedule of the competition was as follows (all draws were held at the UEFA headquarters in Nyon, Switzerland).

Schedule for the qualifying phase of the 2022–23 UEFA Champions League
Round	Draw date	First leg	Second leg
Preliminary round	7 June 2022	21 June 2022 (semi-finals)	24 June 2022 (final)
First qualifying round	14 June 2022	5–6 July 2022	12–13 July 2022
Second qualifying round	15 June 2022	19–20 July 2022	26–27 July 2022
Third qualifying round	18 July 2022	2–3 August 2022	9 August 2022
Play-offs	2 August 2022	16–17 August 2022	23–24 August 2022

== Preliminary round ==
The preliminary round consisted of two semi-finals on 21 June 2022 and the final on 24 June 2022. The draw for the preliminary round was held on 7 June 2022.

=== Seeding ===
A total of four teams played in the preliminary round. Seeding of teams was based on their 2022 UEFA club coefficients, with two seeded teams and two unseeded teams in the semi-final round. The matches took place at Víkingsvöllur in Reykjavík, Iceland so the first team drawn in each tie in the semi-final round, and also the final round (between the two winners of the semi-finals, whose identity was not known at the time of draw), would be the "home" team for administrative purposes.

Seeded	Unseeded
(Estonia) FCI Levadia; (San Marino) La Fiorita	(Andorra) Inter Club d'Escaldes; (Iceland) Víkingur Reykjavík

=== Bracket ===
Semi-final round
21 June – Reykjavík
(San Marino) La Fiorita	1
(Andorra) Inter Club d'Escaldes	2
21 June – Reykjavík
(Estonia) FCI Levadia	1
(Iceland) Víkingur Reykjavík	6

Final round
24 June – Reykjavík
(Andorra) Inter Club d'Escaldes	0
(Iceland) Víkingur Reykjavík	1

=== Summary ===
The preliminary round matches consisted of two semi-finals on 21 June 2022 and the final on 24 June 2022.

The winner of the preliminary round final advanced to the first qualifying round. The losers of the semi-finals and final were transferred to the Europa Conference League Champions Path second qualifying round.

Team 1	Score	Team 2
Semi-final round
FCI Levadia (Estonia)	1–6	(Iceland) Víkingur Reykjavík
La Fiorita (San Marino)	1–2	(Andorra) Inter Club d'Escaldes
Final round
Inter Club d'Escaldes (Andorra)	0–1	(Iceland) Víkingur Reykjavík

=== Semi-final round ===
21 June 2022
21:30 (19:30 UTC+0)

FCI Levadia (Estonia)	1–6	(Iceland) Víkingur Reykjavík
Beglarishvili 5' (pen.)	Report	McLagan 10'; K. Ingason 27'; Sigurðsson 45+1'; Hansen 49'; Gudjónsson 71'; Magnússon 77'

Víkingsvöllur, Reykjavík
Attendance: 725
Referee: Tomasz Musiał (Poland)

21 June 2022
15:00 (13:00 UTC+0)

La Fiorita (San Marino)	1–2	(Andorra) Inter Club d'Escaldes
Rinaldi 45+2'	Report	Soldevila 55', 66'

Víkingsvöllur, Reykjavík
Attendance: 39
Referee: Rohit Saggi (Norway)

=== Final round ===
24 June 2022
21:30 (19:30 UTC+0)

Inter Club d'Escaldes (Andorra)	0–1	(Iceland) Víkingur Reykjavík
	Report	K. Ingason 68'

Víkingsvöllur, Reykjavík
Attendance: 925
Referee: Urs Schnyder (Switzerland)

== First qualifying round ==
The draw for the first qualifying round was held on 14 June 2022.

=== Seeding ===
A total of 30 teams played in the first qualifying round: 29 teams which enter in this round, and 1 winner of the preliminary round. Seeding of teams was based on their 2022 UEFA club coefficients. For the winner of the preliminary round, whose identity was not known at the time of draw, the club coefficient of the highest-ranked remaining team was used. Prior to the draw, UEFA formed three groups of five seeded teams and five unseeded teams in accordance with the principles set by the Club Competitions Committee. The first team drawn in each tie would be the home team of the first leg.

Group 1		Group 2		Group 3	
Seeded	Unseeded	Seeded	Unseeded	Seeded	Unseeded
(Bulgaria) Ludogorets Razgrad; (Romania) CFR Cluj; (Hungary) Ferencváros; (Slovenia) Maribor; (Luxembourg) F91 Dudelange	(Montenegro) Sutjeska; (Belarus) Shakhtyor Soligorsk; (Kazakhstan) Tobol; (Armenia) Pyunik; (Albania) Tirana	(Sweden) Malmö FF; (Norway) Bodø/Glimt; (Finland) HJK; (Wales) The New Saints; (Lithuania) Žalgiris	(Northern Ireland) Linfield; (Faroe Islands) KÍ; (Iceland) Víkingur Reykjavík; (Kosovo) Ballkani; (Latvia) RFS	(Azerbaijan) Qarabağ; (Moldova) Sheriff Tiraspol; (Slovakia) Slovan Bratislava; (Gibraltar) Lincoln Red Imps; (Republic of Ireland) Shamrock Rovers	(Bosnia and Herzegovina) Zrinjski Mostar; (Poland) Lech Poznań; (Malta) Hibernians; (North Macedonia) Shkupi; (Georgia (country)) Dinamo Batumi

Notes

1. ^{†} Winner of the preliminary round, whose identity was not known at the time of draw. Teams in italics defeated a team with a higher coefficient, thus effectively taking the coefficient of their opponent in the draw.

=== Summary ===
The first legs were played on 5 and 6 July, and the second legs were played on 12 and 13 July 2022.

The winners of the ties advanced to the Champions Path second qualifying round. The losers were transferred to the Europa Conference League Champions Path second qualifying round.

Team 1	Agg.	Team 2	1st leg	2nd leg
Pyunik (Armenia)	2–2 (4–3 p)	(Romania) CFR Cluj	0–0	2–2 (a.e.t.)
Maribor (Slovenia)	2–0 (Note: Losers drawn to receive a bye to the Europa Conference League third qualifying round.)	(Belarus) Shakhtyor Soligorsk	0–0	2–0
Ludogorets Razgrad (Bulgaria)	3–0	(Montenegro) Sutjeska	2–0	1–0
F91 Dudelange (Luxembourg)	3–1	(Albania) Tirana	1–0	2–1
Tobol (Kazakhstan)	1–5	(Hungary) Ferencváros	0–0	1–5
Malmö FF (Sweden)	6–5	(Iceland) Víkingur Reykjavík	3–2	3–3
Ballkani (Kosovo)	1–2	(Lithuania) Žalgiris	1–1	0–1 (a.e.t.)
HJK (Finland)	2–2 (5–4 p)	(Latvia) RFS	1–0	1–2 (a.e.t.)
Bodø/Glimt (Norway)	4–3	(Faroe Islands) KÍ	3–0	1–3
The New Saints (Wales)	1–2	(Northern Ireland) Linfield	1–0	0–2 (a.e.t.)
Shamrock Rovers (Republic of Ireland)	3–0	(Malta) Hibernians	3–0	0–0
Lech Poznań (Poland)	2–5	(Azerbaijan) Qarabağ	1–0	1–5
Shkupi (North Macedonia)	3–2	(Gibraltar) Lincoln Red Imps	3–0	0–2
Zrinjski Mostar (Bosnia and Herzegovina)	0–1	(Moldova) Sheriff Tiraspol	0–0	0–1
Slovan Bratislava (Slovakia)	2–1	(Georgia (country)) Dinamo Batumi	0–0	2–1 (a.e.t.)

=== Matches ===
5 July 2022
18:00 (20:00 UTC+4)

Pyunik (Armenia)	0–0	(Romania) CFR Cluj
	Report

Vazgen Sargsyan Republican Stadium, Yerevan
Attendance: 8,000
Referee: Bastian Dankert (Germany)
13 July 2022
20:30 (21:30 UTC+3)

CFR Cluj (Romania)	2–2 (a.e.t.)	(Armenia) Pyunik
Adjei-Boateng 6'; Petrila 94'	Report	Gajić 89', 119'
Penalties
Dugandžić (penalty scored); Petrila (penalty missed); Burcă (penalty scored); Muhar (penalty scored); Camora (penalty missed)	3–4	(penalty scored) Cociuc; (penalty scored) Dashyan; (penalty scored) Harutyunyan; (penalty scored) Avagyan

Stadionul Dr. Constantin Rădulescu, Cluj
Attendance: 7,017
Referee: Michael Fabbri (Italy)

2–2 on aggregate; Pyunik won 4–3 on penalties.

6 July 2022
20:15

Maribor (Slovenia)	0–0	(Belarus) Shakhtyor Soligorsk
	Report

Ljudski vrt, Maribor
Attendance: 6,450
Referee: Anastasios Papapetrou (Greece)
13 July 2022
19:00 (20:00 UTC+3)

Shakhtyor Soligorsk (Belarus)	0–2	(Slovenia) Maribor
	Report	Baturina 12', 56'

New Sakarya Stadium, Adapazarı, Turkey (Note: Due to the country's involvement in the Russian invasion of Ukraine, Belarusian teams were required to play their home matches at neutral venues and behind closed doors until further notice.)
Attendance: 0
Referee: Enea Jorgji (Albania)

Maribor won 2–0 on aggregate.

5 July 2022
19:45 (20:45 UTC+3)

Ludogorets Razgrad (Bulgaria)	2–0	(Montenegro) Sutjeska
Santana 74'; Tissera 90+1'	Report

Ludogorets Arena, Razgrad
Attendance: 3,963
Referee: Vítor Ferreira (Portugal)
12 July 2022
21:00

Sutjeska (Montenegro)	0–1	(Bulgaria) Ludogorets Razgrad
	Report	Sotiriou 53'

DG Arena, Podgorica (Note: Sutjeska Nikšić played their home match at the DG Arena in Podgorica, instead of their regular stadium, the Gradski stadion, in Nikšić, which did not meet UEFA requirements.)
Attendance: 1,000
Referee: Gergő Bogár (Hungary)

Ludogorets Razgrad won 3–0 on aggregate.

6 July 2022
19:30

F91 Dudelange (Luxembourg)	1–0	(Albania) Tirana
Nader 71'	Report

Stade Jos Nosbaum, Dudelange
Attendance: 1,555
Referee: Rohit Saggi (Norway)
12 July 2022
20:00

Tirana (Albania)	1–2	(Luxembourg) F91 Dudelange
Xhixha 78'	Report	Bojić 49'; Sinani 61'

Arena Kombëtare, Tirana (Note: Tirana played their home match at the Arena Kombëtare, instead of their regular stadium, the Selman Stërmasi Stadium, which did not meet UEFA requirements.)
Attendance: 6,000
Referee: César Soto Grado (Spain)

F91 Dudelange won 3–1 on aggregate.

6 July 2022
16:00 (20:00 UTC+6)

Tobol (Kazakhstan)	0–0	(Hungary) Ferencváros
	Report

Central Stadium, Kostanay
Attendance: 8,420
Referee: Dario Bel (Croatia)
13 July 2022
20:00

Ferencváros (Hungary)	5–1	(Kazakhstan) Tobol
Traoré 4', 17'; Laïdouni 21'; Bassey 74', 90+1'	Report	Sergeyev 23'

Ferencváros Stadion, Budapest
Attendance: 17,347
Referee: Krzysztof Jakubik (Poland)

Ferencváros won 5–1 on aggregate.

5 July 2022
19:00

Malmö FF (Sweden)	3–2	(Iceland) Víkingur Reykjavík
Olsson 16'; Toivonen 42'; Birmančević 84'	Report	K. Ingason 38'; Gudjónsson 90+3'

Eleda Stadion, Malmö
Attendance: 11,830
Referee: Dumitri Muntean (Moldova)
12 July 2022
21:30 (19:30 UTC+0)

Víkingur Reykjavík (Iceland)	3–3	(Sweden) Malmö FF
K. Gunnarsson 15', 75'; Hansen 56'	Report	Birmančević 34'; Beijmo 44'; Christiansen 47'

Víkingsvöllur, Reykjavík
Attendance: 1,080
Referee: John Beaton (Scotland)

Malmö FF won 6–5 on aggregate.

5 July 2022
20:00

Ballkani (Kosovo)	1–1	(Lithuania) Žalgiris
Gripshi 15'	Report	Buff 25'

Fadil Vokrri Stadium, Pristina (Note: Ballkani played their home match at the Fadil Vokrri Stadium in Pristina, instead of their regular stadium, the Theranda City Stadium, Suva Reka, which did not meet UEFA requirements.)
Attendance: 4,000
Referee: Rob Harvey (Republic of Ireland)
12 July 2022
18:00 (19:00 UTC+3)

Žalgiris (Lithuania)	1–0 (a.e.t.)	(Kosovo) Ballkani
Oyewusi 97'	Report

LFF Stadium, Vilnius
Attendance: 3,542
Referee: Espen Eskås (Norway)

Žalgiris won 2–1 on aggregate.

6 July 2022
18:00 (19:00 UTC+3)

HJK (Finland)	1–0	(Latvia) RFS
Martic 11'	Report

Bolt Arena, Helsinki
Attendance: 3,874
Referee: Juxhin Xhaja (Albania)
12 July 2022
17:30 (18:30 UTC+3)

RFS (Latvia)	2–1 (a.e.t.)	(Finland) HJK
Zjuzins 48'; Panić 56'	Report	Murilo 75'
Penalties
Jagodinskis (penalty scored); Šarić (penalty scored); Panić (penalty missed); Lipušček (penalty scored); Mareš (penalty scored)	4–5	(penalty scored) Väänänen; (penalty scored) Murilo; (penalty scored) Radulović; (penalty scored) Serrarens; (penalty scored) Terho

Slokas Stadium, Jūrmala (Note: RFS played their home match at the Slokas Stadium in Jūrmala, instead of their regular stadium, LNK Sports Parks, in Riga, which did not meet UEFA requirements.)
Attendance: 1,631
Referee: David Fuxman (Israel)

2–2 on aggregate; HJK won 5–4 on penalties.

6 July 2022
18:00

Bodø/Glimt (Norway)	3–0	(Faroe Islands) KÍ
Boniface 11', 31', 58' (pen.)	Report

Aspmyra Stadion, Bodø
Attendance: 4,227
Referee: Mohammed Al-Hakim (Sweden)
13 July 2022
19:00 (18:00 UTC+1) (Note: The KÍ Klaksvík v Bodø/Glimt match, originally scheduled for 12 July 2022, 20:00 (19:00 UTC+1), was rescheduled to the following day, 19:00 (18:00 UTC+1), as Bodo/Glimt's flight to the Faroe Islands arrived late due to bad weather conditions.)

KÍ (Faroe Islands)	3–1	(Norway) Bodø/Glimt
Mikkelsen 12'; J. Andreasen 20', 85'	Report	Boniface 55' (pen.)

Við Djúpumýrar, Klaksvík
Attendance: 883
Referee: Horațiu Feșnic (Romania)

Bodø/Glimt won 4–3 on aggregate.

5 July 2022
20:00 (19:00 UTC+1)

The New Saints (Wales)	1–0	(Northern Ireland) Linfield
Brobbel 57'	Report

Park Hall, Oswestry
Attendance: 1,034
Referee: Andrei Chivulete (Romania)
13 July 2022
20:45 (19:45 UTC+1)

Linfield (Northern Ireland)	2–0 (a.e.t.)	(Wales) The New Saints
Mulgrew 90+4'; Devine 95'	Report

Windsor Park, Belfast
Attendance: 2,971
Referee: Duje Strukan (Croatia)

Linfield won 2–1 on aggregate.

5 July 2022
20:30 (19:30 UTC+1)

Shamrock Rovers (Republic of Ireland)	3–0	(Malta) Hibernians
Finn 25'; Watts 40'; Gaffney 78'	Report

Tallaght Stadium, Tallaght
Attendance: 7,019
Referee: Morten Krogh (Denmark)
12 July 2022
20:00

Hibernians (Malta)	0–0	(Republic of Ireland) Shamrock Rovers
	Report

Centenary Stadium, Ta' Qali (Note: Hibernians played their home match at the Centenary Stadium in Ta'Qali, instead of their regular stadium, the Hibernians Stadium, in Paola, which did not meet UEFA requirements.)
Attendance: 979
Referee: Manfredas Lukjančukas (Lithuania)

Shamrock Rovers won 3–0 on aggregate.

5 July 2022
20:00

Lech Poznań (Poland)	1–0	(Azerbaijan) Qarabağ
Ishak 41'	Report

Stadion Poznań, Poznań
Attendance: 25,118
Referee: José Luis Munuera (Spain)
12 July 2022
18:00 (20:00 UTC+4)

Qarabağ (Azerbaijan)	5–1	(Poland) Lech Poznań
Kady 14', 74'; Ozobić 42'; Medina 56'; A. Hüseynov 77'	Report	Velde 1'

Tofiq Bahramov Republican Stadium, Baku
Attendance: 27,652
Referee: Andrew Madley (England)

Qarabağ won 5–2 on aggregate.

5 July 2022
20:45

Shkupi (North Macedonia)	3–0	(Gibraltar) Lincoln Red Imps
Danfa 11'; Adetunji 29'; Wiseman 62' (o.g.)	Report

Toše Proeski Arena, Skopje (Note: Shkupi played their home matches at the Toše Proeski Arena, instead of their regular stadium, the Čair Stadium, which did not meet UEFA requirements.)
Attendance: 2,500
Referee: Sebastian Gishamer (Austria)
12 July 2022
18:00

Lincoln Red Imps (Gibraltar)	2–0	(North Macedonia) Shkupi
Juanfri 32'; Casciaro 69'	Report

Victoria Stadium, Gibraltar
Attendance: 896
Referee: Filip Glova (Slovakia)

Shkupi won 3–2 on aggregate.

6 July 2022
20:00

Zrinjski Mostar (Bosnia and Herzegovina)	0–0	(Moldova) Sheriff Tiraspol
	Report

Stadion pod Bijelim Brijegom, Mostar
Attendance: 5,400
Referee: Fabio Maresca (Italy)
12 July 2022
19:00 (20:00 UTC+3)

Sheriff Tiraspol (Moldova)	1–0	(Bosnia and Herzegovina) Zrinjski Mostar
Savić 22' (o.g.)	Report

Zimbru Stadium, Chișinău (Note: Sheriff Tiraspol played their home matches at the Zimbru Stadium in Chișinău, instead of their regular stadium, the Sheriff Stadium, in Tiraspol, due to Transnistria's involvement in the Russian invasion of Ukraine.)
Attendance: 4,242
Referee: Radu Petrescu (Romania)

Sheriff Tiraspol won 1–0 on aggregate.

6 July 2022
20:30

Slovan Bratislava (Slovakia)	0–0	(Georgia (country)) Dinamo Batumi
	Report

Tehelné pole, Bratislava
Attendance: 10,589
Referee: David Coote (England)
13 July 2022
19:00 (21:00 UTC+4)

Dinamo Batumi (Georgia (country))	1–2 (a.e.t.)	(Slovakia) Slovan Bratislava
Davitashvili 104'	Report	Barseghyan 115'; Weiss 120+3'

Batumi Stadium, Batumi
Attendance: 20,022
Referee: António Nobre (Portugal)

Slovan Bratislava won 2–1 on aggregate.

== Second qualifying round ==
The draw for the second qualifying round was held on 15 June 2022.

=== Seeding ===
A total of 24 teams played in the second qualifying round. They were divided into two paths:

- Champions Path (20 teams): 5 teams which enter in this round, and 15 winners of the first qualifying round.
- League Path (4 teams): 4 teams which enter in this round.

Seeding of teams was based on their 2022 UEFA club coefficients. For the winners of the first qualifying round, whose identity was not known at the time of draw, the club coefficient of the highest-ranked remaining team in each tie was used. Prior to the draw, UEFA formed three groups for the champions path draw in accordance with the principles set by the Club Competitions Committee: two groups that produce three ties each (Groups 1 and 2) and one with four ties (Group 3). The first team drawn in each tie would be the home team of the first leg.

Champions Path
Group 1		Group 2		Group 3	
Seeded	Unseeded	Seeded	Unseeded	Seeded	Unseeded
(Croatia) Dinamo Zagreb; (Azerbaijan) Qarabağ; (Hungary) Ferencváros	(Slovakia) Slovan Bratislava; (North Macedonia) Shkupi; (Switzerland) Zürich	(Czech Republic) Viktoria Plzeň; (Sweden) Malmö FF; (Norway) Bodø/Glimt	(Finland) HJK; (Northern Ireland) Linfield; (Lithuania) Žalgiris	(Greece) Olympiacos; (Bulgaria) Ludogorets Razgrad; (Moldova) Sheriff Tiraspol; (Armenia) Pyunik	(Slovenia) Maribor; (Luxembourg) F91 Dudelange; (Israel) Maccabi Haifa; (Republic of Ireland) Shamrock Rovers

Notes

1. ^{†} Winner of the first qualifying round, whose identity was not known at the time of draw. Teams in italics defeated a team with a higher coefficient, thus effectively taking the coefficient of their opponent in the draw.

League Path
Seeded	Unseeded
(Ukraine) Dynamo Kyiv; (Denmark) Midtjylland	(Turkey) Fenerbahçe; (Cyprus) AEK Larnaca

=== Summary ===
The first legs were played on 19 and 20 July, and the second legs were played on 26 and 27 July 2022.

The winners of the ties advanced to the third qualifying round of their respective path. The Champions Path losers were transferred to the Europa League Champions Path third qualifying round, while the League Path losers were transferred to the Europa League Main Path third qualifying round.

Team 1	Agg.	Team 2	1st leg	2nd leg
Champions Path
Ferencváros (Hungary)	5–3	(Slovakia) Slovan Bratislava	1–2	4–1
Dinamo Zagreb (Croatia)	3–2	(North Macedonia) Shkupi	2–2	1–0
Qarabağ (Azerbaijan)	5–4	(Switzerland) Zürich	3–2	2–2 (a.e.t.)
HJK (Finland)	1–7	(Czech Republic) Viktoria Plzeň	1–2	0–5
Linfield (Northern Ireland)	1–8	(Norway) Bodø/Glimt	1–0	0–8
Žalgiris (Lithuania)	3–0	(Sweden) Malmö FF	1–0	2–0
Ludogorets Razgrad (Bulgaria)	4–2	(Republic of Ireland) Shamrock Rovers	3–0	1–2
Maribor (Slovenia)	0–1	(Moldova) Sheriff Tiraspol	0–0	0–1
Maccabi Haifa (Israel)	5–1	(Greece) Olympiacos	1–1	4–0
Pyunik (Armenia)	4–2	(Luxembourg) F91 Dudelange	0–1	4–1
League Path
Midtjylland (Denmark)	2–2 (4–3 p)	(Cyprus) AEK Larnaca	1–1	1–1 (a.e.t.)
Dynamo Kyiv (Ukraine)	2–1	(Turkey) Fenerbahçe	0–0	2–1 (a.e.t.)

=== Champions Path matches ===
20 July 2022
20:00

Ferencváros (Hungary)	1–2	(Slovakia) Slovan Bratislava
Zachariassen 70'	Report	Kashia 81'; Barseghyan 86'

Ferencváros Stadion, Budapest
Attendance: 20,459
Referee: Ricardo de Burgos Bengoetxea (Spain)
27 July 2022
20:30

Slovan Bratislava (Slovakia)	1–4	(Hungary) Ferencváros
De Marco 70'	Report	Boli 20'; Zachariassen 31'; Traoré 89'; Laïdouni 90+5'

Tehelné pole, Bratislava
Attendance: 21,500
Referee: Marco Di Bello (Italy)

Ferencváros won 5–3 on aggregate.

19 July 2022
21:00

Dinamo Zagreb (Croatia)	2–2	(North Macedonia) Shkupi
Ademi 44'; Petković 86'	Report	Queven 25'; Cephas 89'

Stadion Maksimir, Zagreb
Attendance: 7,912
Referee: Radu Petrescu (Romania)
26 July 2022
21:00

Shkupi (North Macedonia)	0–1	(Croatia) Dinamo Zagreb
	Report	Ademi 47'

Toše Proeski Arena, Skopje
Attendance: 12,500
Referee: Jakob Kehlet (Denmark)

Dinamo Zagreb won 3–2 on aggregate.

19 July 2022
18:00 (20:00 UTC+4)

Qarabağ (Azerbaijan)	3–2	(Switzerland) Zürich
Kady 17'; Wadji 36', 66'	Report	Kamberi 65'; Kryeziu 85' (pen.)

Tofiq Bahramov Republican Stadium, Baku
Attendance: 30,782
Referee: Irfan Peljto (Bosnia and Herzegovina)
27 July 2022
19:00

Zürich (Switzerland)	2–2 (a.e.t.)	(Azerbaijan) Qarabağ
Medvedev 4' (o.g.); Santini 90+6'	Report	Kady 56'; Owusu 98'

Letzigrund, Zürich
Attendance: 10,237
Referee: Allard Lindhout (Netherlands)

Qarabağ won 5–4 on aggregate.

20 July 2022
18:00 (19:00 UTC+3)

HJK (Finland)	1–2	(Czech Republic) Viktoria Plzeň
Radulović 50'	Report	Chorý 6' (pen.); Kopic 57'

Bolt Arena, Helsinki
Attendance: 5,236
Referee: Nikola Dabanović (Montenegro)
26 July 2022
19:00

Viktoria Plzeň (Czech Republic)	5–0	(Finland) HJK
Pernica 11'; Sýkora 21', 73'; Hejda 31'; Kliment 84'	Report

Doosan Arena, Plzeň
Attendance: 10,810
Referee: Aleksandar Stavrev (North Macedonia)

Viktoria Plzeň won 7–1 on aggregate.

19 July 2022
20:45 (19:45 UTC+1)

Linfield (Northern Ireland)	1–0	(Norway) Bodø/Glimt
Millar 83'	Report

Windsor Park, Belfast
Attendance: 3,168
Referee: Andris Treimanis (Latvia)
27 July 2022
18:00

Bodø/Glimt (Norway)	8–0	(Northern Ireland) Linfield
Vetlesen 7'; Boniface 21' (pen.); Pellegrino 25', 54' (pen.); Saltnes 29'; Espejord 52', 88'; Sampsted 73'	Report

Aspmyra Stadion, Bodø
Attendance: 5,110
Referee: Roi Reinshreiber (Israel)

Bodø/Glimt won 8–1 on aggregate.

19 July 2022
18:00 (19:00 UTC+3)

Žalgiris (Lithuania)	1–0	(Sweden) Malmö FF
Ourega 49'	Report

LFF Stadium, Vilnius
Attendance: 4,918
Referee: Georgi Kabakov (Bulgaria)
27 July 2022
19:00

Malmö FF (Sweden)	0–2	(Lithuania) Žalgiris
	Report	Oyewusi 34'; Oliveira 52'

Eleda Stadion, Malmö
Attendance: 17,234
Referee: Kristo Tohver (Estonia)

Žalgiris won 3–0 on aggregate.

19 July 2022
19:45 (20:45 UTC+3)

Ludogorets Razgrad (Bulgaria)	3–0	(Republic of Ireland) Shamrock Rovers
Sotiriou 26', 35'; Igor Thiago 90+4'	Report

Ludogorets Arena, Razgrad
Attendance: 4,983
Referee: João Pinheiro (Portugal)
26 July 2022
21:00 (20:00 UTC+1)

Shamrock Rovers (Republic of Ireland)	2–1	(Bulgaria) Ludogorets Razgrad
Greene 21'; Emakhu 88'	Report	Cauly 90+1'

Tallaght Stadium, Tallaght
Attendance: 6,322
Referee: Fabio Maresca (Italy)

Ludogorets Razgrad won 4–2 on aggregate.

20 July 2022
20:15

Maribor (Slovenia)	0–0	(Moldova) Sheriff Tiraspol
	Report

Ljudski vrt, Maribor
Attendance: 7,150
Referee: Harald Lechner (Austria)
26 July 2022
19:00 (20:00 UTC+3)

Sheriff Tiraspol (Moldova)	1–0	(Slovenia) Maribor
Yansané 88'	Report

Zimbru Stadium, Chișinău
Attendance: 6,738
Referee: Tamás Bognár (Hungary)

Sheriff Tiraspol won 1–0 on aggregate.

20 July 2022
19:00 (20:00 UTC+3)

Maccabi Haifa (Israel)	1–1	(Greece) Olympiacos
Haziza 90+2'	Report	Zinckernagel 7'

Sammy Ofer Stadium, Haifa
Attendance: 29,654
Referee: Sascha Stegemann (Germany)
27 July 2022
21:00 (22:00 UTC+3)

Olympiacos (Greece)	0–4	(Israel) Maccabi Haifa
	Report	Chery 5'; Pierrot 61', 65'; Abu Fani 87'

Karaiskakis Stadium, Piraeus
Attendance: 21,705
Referee: Daniel Stefański (Poland)

Maccabi Haifa won 5–1 on aggregate.

19 July 2022
18:00 (20:00 UTC+4)

Pyunik (Armenia)	0–1	(Luxembourg) F91 Dudelange
	Report	Hadji 72' (pen.)

Vazgen Sargsyan Republican Stadium, Yerevan
Attendance: 9,000
Referee: Craig Pawson (England)
26 July 2022
19:30

F91 Dudelange (Luxembourg)	1–4	(Armenia) Pyunik
Hassan 21'	Report	Juninho 24'; Juričić 54', 85'; Otubanjo 76'

Stade Jos Nosbaum, Dudelange
Attendance: 1,495
Referee: José Luis Munuera (Spain)

Pyunik won 4–2 on aggregate.

=== League Path matches ===
19 July 2022
19:45

Midtjylland (Denmark)	1–1	(Cyprus) AEK Larnaca
Sviatchenko 84'	Report	Gyurcsó 81'

MCH Arena, Herning
Attendance: 7,008
Referee: Novak Simović (Serbia)
26 July 2022
17:30 (18:30 UTC+3)

AEK Larnaca (Cyprus)	1–1 (a.e.t.)	(Denmark) Midtjylland
Olatunji 9'	Report	Dalsgaard 12'
Penalties
Altman (penalty missed); Miličević (penalty scored); Romo (penalty scored); Gama (penalty scored); Gustavo (penalty missed)	3–4	(penalty scored) Dreyer; (penalty scored) Sisto; (penalty scored) Sørensen; (penalty scored) Dyhr; (penalty missed) Kaba

AEK Arena – Georgios Karapatakis, Larnaca
Attendance: 6,163
Referee: István Vad (Hungary)

2–2 on aggregate; Midtjylland won 4–3 on penalties.

20 July 2022
20:00

Dynamo Kyiv (Ukraine)	0–0	(Turkey) Fenerbahçe
	Report

Stadion Miejski im. Władysława Króla, Łódź, Poland (Note: Due to the Russian invasion of Ukraine, Ukrainian teams were required to play their home matches at neutral venues until further notice.)
Attendance: 11,603
Referee: Glenn Nyberg (Sweden)
27 July 2022
19:00 (20:00 UTC+3)

Fenerbahçe (Turkey)	1–2 (a.e.t.)	(Ukraine) Dynamo Kyiv
Szalai 89'	Report	Buyalskyi 57'; Karavayev 114'

Şükrü Saracoğlu Stadium, Istanbul
Attendance: 40,000
Referee: Massimiliano Irrati (Italy)

Dynamo Kyiv won 2–1 on aggregate.

== Third qualifying round ==
The draw for the third qualifying round was held on 18 July 2022.

=== Seeding ===
A total of 20 teams played in the third qualifying round. They were divided into two paths:

- Champions Path (12 teams): 2 teams which enter in this round, and 10 winners of the second qualifying round (Champions Path).
- League Path (8 teams): 6 teams which enter in this round, and 2 winners of the second qualifying round (League Path).

Seeding of teams was based on their 2022 UEFA club coefficients. For the winners of the second qualifying round, whose identity was not known at the time of draw, the club coefficient of the highest-ranked remaining team in each tie was used. Prior to the draw, UEFA formed two groups of three seeded teams and three unseeded teams in accordance with the principles set by the Club Competitions Committee. The first team drawn in each tie would be the home team of the first leg.

Champions Path
Group 1		Group 2	
Seeded	Unseeded	Seeded	Unseeded
(Croatia) Dinamo Zagreb; (Israel) Maccabi Haifa; (Azerbaijan) Qarabağ	(Bulgaria) Ludogorets Razgrad; (Hungary) Ferencváros; (Cyprus) Apollon Limassol	(Serbia) Red Star Belgrade; (Czech Republic) Viktoria Plzeň; (Lithuania) Žalgiris	(Moldova) Sheriff Tiraspol; (Norway) Bodø/Glimt; (Armenia) Pyunik

League Path
Seeded	Unseeded
(Portugal) Benfica; (Scotland) Rangers; (Ukraine) Dynamo Kyiv; (Netherlands) PSV Eindhoven	(France) Monaco; (Denmark) Midtjylland; (Austria) Sturm Graz; (Belgium) Union Saint-Gilloise

Notes

1. ^{†} Winner of the second qualifying round, whose identity was not known at the time of draw. Teams in italics defeated a team with a higher coefficient, thus effectively taking the coefficient of their opponent in the draw.

=== Summary ===
The first legs were played on 2 and 3 August, and the second legs were played on 9 August 2022.

The winners of the ties advanced to the play-off round of their respective path. The Champions Path losers were transferred to the Europa League play-off round, while the League Path losers were transferred to the Europa League group stage.

Team 1	Agg.	Team 2	1st leg	2nd leg
Champions Path
Maccabi Haifa (Israel)	4–2	(Cyprus) Apollon Limassol	4–0	0–2
Qarabağ (Azerbaijan)	4–2	(Hungary) Ferencváros	1–1	3–1
Ludogorets Razgrad (Bulgaria)	3–6	(Croatia) Dinamo Zagreb	1–2	2–4
Sheriff Tiraspol (Moldova)	2–4	(Czech Republic) Viktoria Plzeň	1–2	1–2
Bodø/Glimt (Norway)	6–1	(Lithuania) Žalgiris	5–0	1–1
Red Star Belgrade (Serbia)	7–0	(Armenia) Pyunik	5–0	2–0
League Path
Monaco (France)	3–4	(Netherlands) PSV Eindhoven	1–1	2–3 (a.e.t.)
Dynamo Kyiv (Ukraine)	3–1	(Austria) Sturm Graz	1–0	2–1 (a.e.t.)
Union Saint-Gilloise (Belgium)	2–3	(Scotland) Rangers	2–0	0–3
Benfica (Portugal)	7–2	(Denmark) Midtjylland	4–1	3–1

=== Champions Path matches ===
3 August 2022
19:00 (20:00 UTC+3)

Maccabi Haifa (Israel)	4–0	(Cyprus) Apollon Limassol
Peybernes 38' (o.g.); Mohamed 54', 62'; Pierrot 79'	Report

Sammy Ofer Stadium, Haifa
Attendance: 30,000
Referee: Maurizio Mariani (Italy)
9 August 2022
19:00 (20:00 UTC+3)

Apollon Limassol (Cyprus)	2–0	(Israel) Maccabi Haifa
Ongenda 19'; Coll 27'	Report

GSP Stadium, Nicosia (Note: Apollon Limassol played their home match at the GSP Stadium in Nicosia, instead of their regular stadium, the Tsirio Stadium, in Limassol, which did not meet UEFA requirements.)
Attendance: 3,936
Referee: Felix Zwayer (Germany)

Maccabi Haifa won 4–2 on aggregate.

3 August 2022
18:00 (20:00 UTC+4)

Qarabağ (Azerbaijan)	1–1	(Hungary) Ferencváros
Owusu 34'	Report	Boli 17'

Tofiq Bahramov Republican Stadium, Baku
Attendance: 31,200
Referee: Andreas Ekberg (Sweden)
9 August 2022
20:00

Ferencváros (Hungary)	1–3	(Azerbaijan) Qarabağ
Traoré 86'	Report	Zoubir 7'; Wadji 54', 78'

Ferencváros Stadion, Budapest
Attendance: 18,875
Referee: Carlos del Cerro Grande (Spain)

Qarabağ won 4–2 on aggregate.

2 August 2022
19:45 (20:45 UTC+3)

Ludogorets Razgrad (Bulgaria)	1–2	(Croatia) Dinamo Zagreb
Tekpetey 22'	Report	Perić 6'; Padt 9' (o.g.)

Ludogorets Arena, Razgrad
Attendance: 7,505
Referee: Cüneyt Çakır (Turkey)
9 August 2022
20:00

Dinamo Zagreb (Croatia)	4–2	(Bulgaria) Ludogorets Razgrad
Drmić 12'; Oršić 27' (pen.), 44'; Petković 87' (pen.)	Report	Despodov 45+4', 49' (pen.)

Stadion Maksimir, Zagreb
Attendance: 13,658
Referee: Benoît Bastien (France)

Dinamo Zagreb won 6–3 on aggregate.

2 August 2022
19:00 (20:00 UTC+3)

Sheriff Tiraspol (Moldova)	1–2	(Czech Republic) Viktoria Plzeň
Akanbi 36' (pen.)	Report	Chorý 41' (pen.); Bucha 55'

Zimbru Stadium, Chișinău
Attendance: 8,153
Referee: Danny Makkelie (Netherlands)
9 August 2022
19:00

Viktoria Plzeň (Czech Republic)	2–1	(Moldova) Sheriff Tiraspol
Kliment 10'; Mosquera 62'	Report	Akanbi 47' (pen.)

Doosan Arena, Plzeň
Attendance: 10,770
Referee: Orel Grinfeld (Israel)

Viktoria Plzeň won 4–2 on aggregate.

3 August 2022
18:00

Bodø/Glimt (Norway)	5–0	(Lithuania) Žalgiris
Vetlesen 33' (pen.); Pellegrino 36'; Salvesen 58'; Høibråten 61'; Espejord 90+3'	Report

Aspmyra Stadion, Bodø
Attendance: 6,117
Referee: István Vad (Hungary)
9 August 2022
18:00 (19:00 UTC+3)

Žalgiris (Lithuania)	1–1	(Norway) Bodø/Glimt
Kyeremeh 39'	Report	Mvuka 51'

LFF Stadium, Vilnius
Attendance: 4,629
Referee: Sandro Schärer (Switzerland)

Bodø/Glimt won 6–1 on aggregate.

3 August 2022
20:45

Red Star Belgrade (Serbia)	5–0	(Armenia) Pyunik
Bukari 29', 44', 70'; Kangwa 33'; Mitrović 77'	Report

Red Star Stadium, Belgrade
Attendance: 40,456
Referee: Artur Soares Dias (Portugal)
9 August 2022
19:00 (21:00 UTC+4)

Pyunik (Armenia)	0–2	(Serbia) Red Star Belgrade
	Report	Kanga 44' (pen.); Pavkov 60'

Vazgen Sargsyan Republican Stadium, Yerevan
Attendance: 6,000
Referee: Willie Collum (Scotland)

Red Star Belgrade won 7–0 on aggregate.

=== League Path matches ===
2 August 2022
20:00

Monaco (France)	1–1	(Netherlands) PSV Eindhoven
Disasi 80'	Report	Veerman 38'

Stade Louis II, Monaco
Attendance: 10,802
Referee: Davide Massa (Italy)
9 August 2022
20:30

PSV Eindhoven (Netherlands)	3–2 (a.e.t.)	(France) Monaco
Veerman 21'; Gutiérrez 89'; De Jong 109'	Report	Maripán 58'; Ben Yedder 70'

Philips Stadion, Eindhoven
Attendance: 35,000
Referee: Jesús Gil Manzano (Spain)

PSV Eindhoven won 4–3 on aggregate.

3 August 2022
20:00

Dynamo Kyiv (Ukraine)	1–0	(Austria) Sturm Graz
Karavayev 28'	Report

Stadion Miejski im. Władysława Króla, Łódź, Poland
Attendance: 6,092
Referee: François Letexier (France)
9 August 2022
20:30

Sturm Graz (Austria)	1–2 (a.e.t.)	(Ukraine) Dynamo Kyiv
Højlund 27'	Report	Vivcharenko 97'; Tsyhankov 112'

Liebenauer Stadium, Graz
Attendance: 14,007
Referee: Ivan Kružliak (Slovakia)

Dynamo Kyiv won 3–1 on aggregate.

2 August 2022
20:45

Union Saint-Gilloise (Belgium)	2–0	(Scotland) Rangers
Teuma 27'; Vanzeir 76' (pen.)	Report

Den Dreef, Leuven (Note: Union Saint-Gilloise played their home match at Den Dreef in Leuven, instead of their regular stadium, the Joseph Marien Stadium, in Brussels, which did not meet UEFA requirements.)
Attendance: 1,100
Referee: Irfan Peljto (Bosnia and Herzegovina)
9 August 2022
20:45 (19:45 UTC+1)

Rangers (Scotland)	3–0	(Belgium) Union Saint-Gilloise
Tavernier 45' (pen.); Čolak 58'; Tillman 79'	Report

Ibrox Stadium, Glasgow
Attendance: 48,454
Referee: Anastasios Sidiropoulos (Greece)

Rangers won 3–2 on aggregate.

2 August 2022
21:00 (20:00 UTC+1)

Benfica (Portugal)	4–1	(Denmark) Midtjylland
Ramos 17', 33', 61'; Fernández 40'	Report	Sisto 78' (pen.)

Estádio da Luz, Lisbon
Attendance: 53,346
Referee: Alejandro Hernández Hernández (Spain)
9 August 2022
19:45

Midtjylland (Denmark)	1–3	(Portugal) Benfica
Sisto 63'	Report	Fernández 23'; Araújo 56'; Gonçalves 88'

Cepheus Park, Randers (Note: Midtjylland played their third qualifying round home match at Randers Stadium in Randers as their regular stadium, the MCH Arena in Herning, was being used for the 2022 FEI World Equestrian Games.)
Attendance: 5,111
Referee: Srđan Jovanović (Serbia)

Benfica won 7–2 on aggregate.

== Play-off round ==
The draw for the play-off round was held on 2 August 2022.

=== Seeding ===
A total of 12 teams played in the play-off round. They were divided into two paths:

- Champions Path (8 teams): 2 teams which entered in this round, and 6 winners of the third qualifying round (Champions Path).
- League Path (4 teams): 4 winners of the third qualifying round (League Path).

Seeding of teams was based on their 2022 UEFA club coefficients. For the winners of the third qualifying round, whose identity was not known at the time of draw, the club coefficient of the highest-ranked remaining team in each tie was used. The first team drawn in each tie would be the home team of the first leg.

Champions Path
Seeded	Unseeded
(Croatia) Dinamo Zagreb; (Serbia) Red Star Belgrade; (Denmark) Copenhagen; (Czech Republic) Viktoria Plzeň	(Azerbaijan) Qarabağ; (Norway) Bodø/Glimt; (Israel) Maccabi Haifa; (Turkey) Trabzonspor

League Path
Seeded	Unseeded
(Portugal) Benfica; (Scotland) Rangers	(Ukraine) Dynamo Kyiv; (Netherlands) PSV Eindhoven

Notes

1. ^{†} Winner of the third qualifying round, whose identity was not known at the time of draw. Teams in italics defeated a team with a higher coefficient, thus effectively taking the coefficient of their opponent in the draw.

=== Summary ===
The first legs were played on 16 and 17 August, and the second legs were played on 23 and 24 August 2022.

The winners of the ties advanced to the group stage. The losers were transferred to the Europa League group stage.

Team 1	Agg.	Team 2	1st leg	2nd leg
Champions Path
Qarabağ (Azerbaijan)	1–2	(Czech Republic) Viktoria Plzeň	0–0	1–2
Bodø/Glimt (Norway)	2–4	(Croatia) Dinamo Zagreb	1–0	1–4 (a.e.t.)
Maccabi Haifa (Israel)	5–4	(Serbia) Red Star Belgrade	3–2	2–2
Copenhagen (Denmark)	2–1	(Turkey) Trabzonspor	2–1	0–0
League Path
Dynamo Kyiv (Ukraine)	0–5	(Portugal) Benfica	0–2	0–3
Rangers (Scotland)	3–2	(Netherlands) PSV Eindhoven	2–2	1–0

=== Champions Path matches ===
17 August 2022
18:45 (20:45 UTC+4)

Qarabağ (Azerbaijan)	0–0	(Czech Republic) Viktoria Plzeň
	Report

Tofiq Bahramov Republican Stadium, Baku
Attendance: 31,150
Referee: Slavko Vinčić (Slovenia)
23 August 2022
21:00

Viktoria Plzeň (Czech Republic)	2–1	(Azerbaijan) Qarabağ
Kopic 58'; Kliment 73'	Report	Ozobić 38'

Doosan Arena, Plzeň
Attendance: 10,963
Referee: Artur Soares Dias (Portugal)

Viktoria Plzeň won 2–1 on aggregate.

16 August 2022
21:00

Bodø/Glimt (Norway)	1–0	(Croatia) Dinamo Zagreb
Pellegrino 37'	Report

Aspmyra Stadion, Bodø
Attendance: 7,762
Referee: Danny Makkelie (Netherlands)
24 August 2022
21:00

Dinamo Zagreb (Croatia)	4–1 (a.e.t.)	(Norway) Bodø/Glimt
Oršić 4'; Petković 35'; Drmić 117'; Bočkaj 120'	Report	Grønbæk 70'

Stadion Maksimir, Zagreb
Attendance: 18,349
Referee: Antonio Mateu Lahoz (Spain)

Dinamo Zagreb won 4–2 on aggregate.

17 August 2022
21:00 (22:00 UTC+3)

Maccabi Haifa (Israel)	3–2	(Serbia) Red Star Belgrade
Pierrot 18', 51'; Chery 61'	Report	Pešić 27'; Kanga 39'

Sammy Ofer Stadium, Haifa
Attendance: 29,132
Referee: Carlos del Cerro Grande (Spain)
23 August 2022
21:00

Red Star Belgrade (Serbia)	2–2	(Israel) Maccabi Haifa
Pešić 27'; Ivanić 43'	Report	Sundgren 45+5'; Pavkov 90' (o.g.)

Red Star Stadium, Belgrade
Attendance: 47,731
Referee: Anthony Taylor (England)

Maccabi Haifa won 5–4 on aggregate.

16 August 2022
21:00

Copenhagen (Denmark)	2–1	(Turkey) Trabzonspor
Claesson 9'; Lerager 48'	Report	Bakasetas 79'

Parken Stadium, Copenhagen
Attendance: 27,520
Referee: Michael Oliver (England)
24 August 2022
21:00 (22:00 UTC+3)

Trabzonspor (Turkey)	0–0	(Denmark) Copenhagen
	Report

Şenol Güneş Sports Complex, Trabzon
Attendance: 36,128
Referee: Danny Makkelie (Netherlands)

Copenhagen won 2–1 on aggregate.

=== League Path matches ===
17 August 2022
21:00

Dynamo Kyiv (Ukraine)	0–2	(Portugal) Benfica
	Report	Gilberto 9'; Ramos 37'

Stadion Miejski im. Władysława Króla, Łódź, Poland
Attendance: 16,450
Referee: Felix Zwayer (Germany)
23 August 2022
21:00 (20:00 UTC+1)

Benfica (Portugal)	3–0	(Ukraine) Dynamo Kyiv
Otamendi 27'; R. Silva 40'; Neres 42'	Report

Estádio da Luz, Lisbon
Attendance: 58,705
Referee: Clément Turpin (France)

Benfica won 5–0 on aggregate.

16 August 2022
21:00 (20:00 UTC+1)

Rangers (Scotland)	2–2	(Netherlands) PSV Eindhoven
Čolak 40'; Lawrence 70'	Report	Sangaré 37'; Obispo 78'

Ibrox Stadium, Glasgow
Attendance: 49,097
Referee: Daniele Orsato (Italy)
24 August 2022
21:00

PSV Eindhoven (Netherlands)	0–1	(Scotland) Rangers
	Report	Čolak 60'

Philips Stadion, Eindhoven
Attendance: 34,893
Referee: Szymon Marciniak (Poland)

Rangers won 3–2 on aggregate.
