= 2022–23 UEFA Champions League =

European football tournament

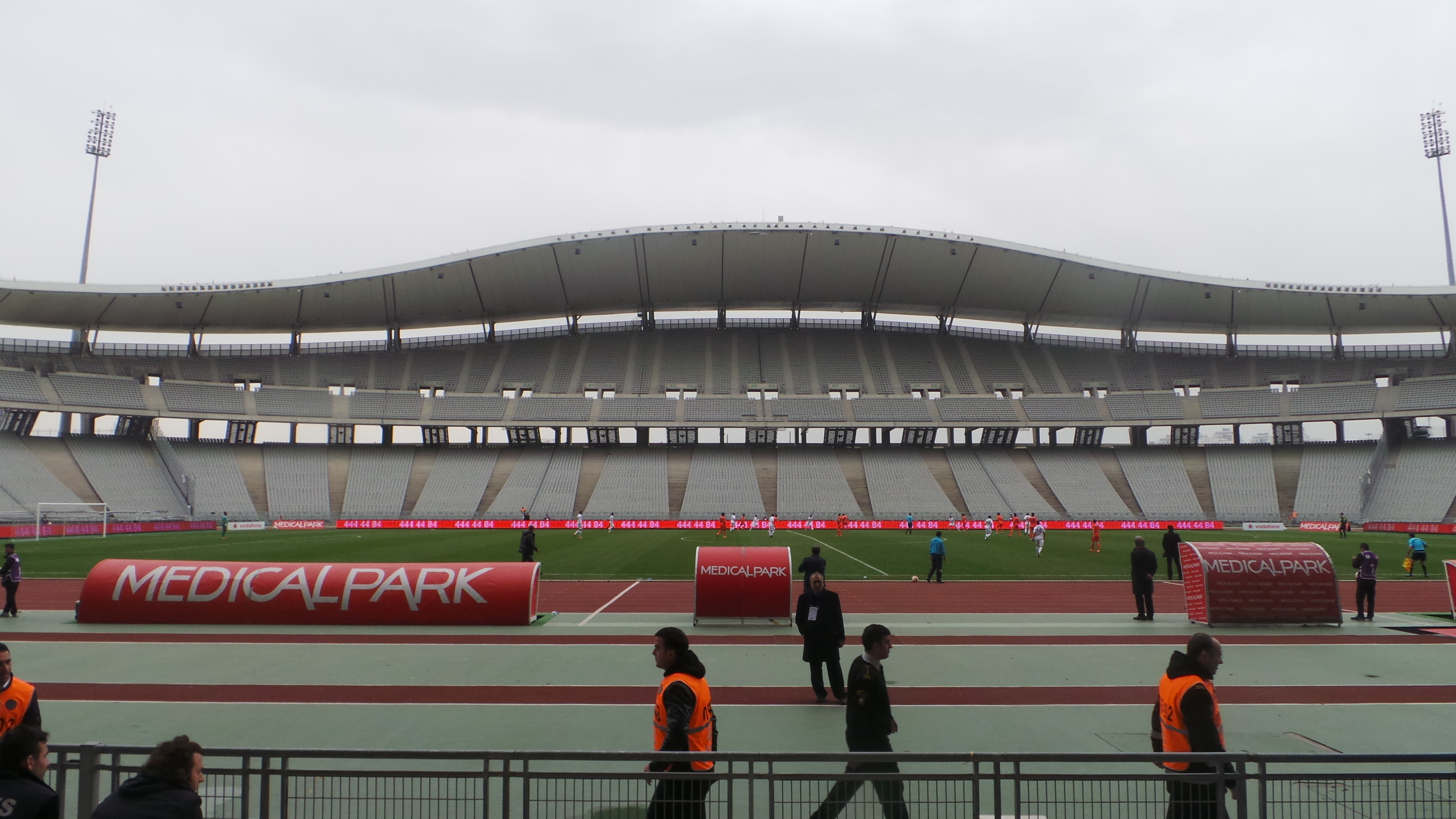
- The Atatürk Olympic Stadium in Istanbul hosted the final

Tournament details
- Dates: Qualifying: 21 June – 24 August 2022; Competition proper: 6 September 2022 – 10 June 2023
- Teams: Competition proper: 32; Total: 78 (from 53 associations)

Final positions
- Champions: (England) Manchester City (1st title)
- Runners-up: (Italy) Inter Milan

Tournament statistics
- Matches played: 125
- Goals scored: 372 (2.98 per match)
- Attendance: 6,194,200 (49,554 per match)
- Top scorer(s): Erling Haaland (Manchester City); 12 goals
- Best player: Rodri (Manchester City)
- Best young player: Khvicha Kvaratskhelia (Napoli)

The 2022–23 UEFA Champions League was the 68th season of Europe's premier club football tournament organised by UEFA, and the 31st season since it was renamed from the European Champion Clubs' Cup to the UEFA Champions League.

The final was played at the Atatürk Olympic Stadium in Istanbul, Turkey, on 10 June 2023. The stadium was originally appointed to host the 2020 UEFA Champions League final, but both this and the 2021 editions, which had been subsequently re-allocated to the Atatürk, were moved due to the COVID-19 pandemic. The 2023 final was contested by English club Manchester City and Italian club Inter Milan, with the former winning 1–0 via a second-half goal by Rodri, who was named man of the match by UEFA. For Manchester City, this was their first-ever European Cup, and first European trophy since 1970. Having earlier won the Premier league and FA Cup titles, they achieved a continental treble. As winners, Manchester City earned the right to play against Sevilla, the winners of the 2022–23 UEFA Europa League, in the 2023 UEFA Super Cup, as well as qualifying for both the 2023 and 2025 FIFA Club World Cups in Saudi Arabia and the United States, respectively.

Real Madrid were the defending champions, having won a record-extending fourteenth European Cup title in the previous edition, but they were eliminated by eventual champions Manchester City in the semi-finals.

== Association team allocation ==
A total of 78 teams from 53 of the 55 UEFA member associations participated in the 2022–23 UEFA Champions League (the exceptions being Russia, who were banned from participating due to the Russian invasion of Ukraine, and Liechtenstein, which did not organise a domestic league). The association ranking based on the UEFA association coefficients was used to determine the number of participating teams for each association:

- Associations 1–4 each had four teams qualify.
- Associations 5–6 each had three teams qualify.
- Associations 7–15 (except Russia) each had two teams qualify.
- Associations 16–55 (except Liechtenstein) each had one team qualify.
- The winners of the 2021–22 UEFA Champions League and 2021–22 UEFA Europa League were each given an additional entry if they did not qualify for the 2022–23 UEFA Champions League through their domestic league.

=== Association ranking ===
For the 2022–23 UEFA Champions League, the associations were allocated places according to their 2021 UEFA association coefficients, which took into account their performance in European competitions from 2016–17 to 2020–21.

Apart from the allocation based on the association coefficients, associations could have additional teams participating in the Champions League, as noted below:

- (UEL) – Additional berth for UEFA Europa League title holders

Association ranking for 2022–23 UEFA Champions League

Rank	Association	Coeff.	Teams	Notes
1	England	100.569	4	
2	Spain	97.855	4	
3	Italy	75.438	4	
4	Germany	73.570	4	+1 (UEL)
5	France	56.081	3	
6	Portugal	48.549	3	
7	Netherlands	39.200	2	
8	Russia	38.382	0	
9	Belgium	36.500	2	
10	Austria	35.825	2	
11	Scotland	33.375	2	
12	Ukraine	33.100	2	
13	Turkey	30.100	2	
14	Denmark	27.875	2	
15	Cyprus	27.750	2	
16	Serbia	26.750	1	
17	Czech Republic	26.600	1	
18	Croatia	26.275	1	
19	Switzerland	26.225	1	

Rank	Association	Coeff.	Teams	Notes
20	Greece	26.000	1	
21	Israel	24.375	1	
22	Norway	21.000	1	
23	Sweden	20.500	1	
24	Bulgaria	20.375	1	
25	Romania	18.200	1	
26	Azerbaijan	16.875	1	
27	Kazakhstan	15.625	1	
28	Hungary	15.500	1	
29	Belarus	15.250	1	
30	Poland	15.125	1	
31	Slovenia	14.250	1	
32	Slovakia	13.625	1	
33	Liechtenstein	9.000	0	
34	Lithuania	8.750	1	
35	Luxembourg	8.250	1	
36	Bosnia and Herzegovina	8.000	1	
37	Republic of Ireland	7.875	1	
38	North Macedonia	7.625	1	

Rank	Association	Coeff.	Teams	Notes
39	Armenia	7.375	1	
40	Latvia	7.375	1	
41	Albania	7.250	1	
42	Northern Ireland	6.958	1	
43	Georgia	6.875	1	
44	Finland	6.875	1	
45	Moldova	6.875	1	
46	Malta	6.375	1	
47	Faroe Islands	6.125	1	
48	Kosovo	5.833	1	
49	Gibraltar	5.666	1	
50	Montenegro	5.000	1	
51	Wales	5.000	1	
52	Iceland	4.875	1	
53	Estonia	4.750	1	
54	Andorra	3.331	1	
55	San Marino	1.166	1	

=== Distribution ===
The following is the access list for this season.

Access list for 2022–23 UEFA Champions League
		Teams entering in this round	Teams advancing from previous round
Preliminary round (4 teams)		4 champions from associations 52–55	
First qualifying round (30 teams)		29 champions from associations 22–51 (except Liechtenstein)	1 winner from the preliminary round
Second qualifying round (24 teams)	Champions Path (20 teams)	5 champions from associations 17–21	15 winners from the first qualifying round
Second qualifying round (24 teams)	League Path (4 teams)	4 runners-up from associations 12–15	
Third qualifying round (20 teams)	Champions Path (12 teams)	2 champions from associations 15–16	10 winners from the second qualifying round (Champions Path)
Third qualifying round (20 teams)	League Path (8 teams)	4 runners-up from associations 7–11 (except Russia); 2 third-placed teams from associations 5–6	2 winners from the second qualifying round (League Path)
Play-off round (12 teams)	Champions Path (8 teams)	2 champions from associations 13–14	6 winners from the third qualifying round (Champions Path)
Play-off round (12 teams)	League Path (4 teams)		4 winners from the third qualifying round (League Path)
Group stage (32 teams)		Europa League title holder; 11 champions from associations 1–12 (except Russia); 6 runners-up from associations 1–6; 4 third-placed teams from associations 1–4; 4 fourth-placed teams from associations 1–4	4 winners from the play-off round (Champions Path); 2 winners from the play-off round (League Path)
Knockout phase (16 teams)			8 group winners from the group stage; 8 group runners-up from the group stage

Due to the suspension of Russia for the 2022–23 European season, the following changes to the access list were made:

- The champions of association 11 (Scotland) enter the group stage instead of the play-off round (Champions Path).
- The champions of association 13 (Turkey) enter the play-off round instead of the third qualifying round (Champions Path).
- The champions of association 15 (Cyprus) enter the third qualifying round instead of the second qualifying round (Champions Path).
- The champions of associations 18 (Croatia) and 19 (Switzerland) enter the second qualifying round instead of the first qualifying round (Champions Path).
- The runners-up of associations 10 (Austria) and 11 (Scotland) enter the third qualifying round instead of the second qualifying round (League Path).

Since the Champions League title holders (Real Madrid) qualified via their domestic league, the following changes to the access list were made:

- The champions of association 12 (Ukraine) enter the group stage instead of the play-off round (Champions Path).
- The champions of association 14 (Denmark) enter the play-off round instead of the third qualifying round (Champions Path).
- The champions of association 16 (Serbia) enter the third qualifying round instead of the second qualifying round (Champions Path).
- The champions of associations 20 (Greece) and 21 (Israel) enter the second qualifying round instead of the first qualifying round (Champions Path).

=== Teams ===
The labels in the parentheses show how each team qualified for the place of its starting round:

- TH: Champions League title holders
- EL: Europa League title holders
- 1st, 2nd, 3rd, 4th, etc.: League positions of the previous season
- Abd-: League positions of abandoned season as determined by the national association; all teams were subject to approval by UEFA

The second qualifying round, third qualifying round and play-off round were divided into Champions Path (CH) and League Path (LP).

Qualified teams for 2022–23 UEFA Champions League
Entry round		Teams			
Group stage		(Spain) Real Madrid (1st)^{TH}	(Germany) Eintracht Frankfurt (EL)	(England) Manchester City (1st)	(England) Liverpool (2nd)
Group stage		(England) Chelsea (3rd)	(England) Tottenham Hotspur (4th)	(Spain) Barcelona (2nd)	(Spain) Atlético Madrid (3rd)
Group stage		(Spain) Sevilla (4th)	(Italy) Milan (1st)	(Italy) Inter Milan (2nd)	(Italy) Napoli (3rd)
Group stage		(Italy) Juventus (4th)	(Germany) Bayern Munich (1st)	(Germany) Borussia Dortmund (2nd)	(Germany) Bayer Leverkusen (3rd)
Group stage		(Germany) RB Leipzig (4th)	(France) Paris Saint-Germain (1st)	(France) Marseille (2nd)	(Portugal) Porto (1st)
Group stage		(Portugal) Sporting CP (2nd)	(Netherlands) Ajax (1st)	(Belgium) Club Brugge (1st)	(Austria) Red Bull Salzburg (1st)
Group stage		(Scotland) Celtic (1st)	(Ukraine) Shakhtar Donetsk (Abd-1st)		
Play-off round	CH	(Turkey) Trabzonspor (1st)	(Denmark) Copenhagen (1st)		
Third qualifying round	CH	(Cyprus) Apollon Limassol (1st)	(Serbia) Red Star Belgrade (1st)		
Third qualifying round	LP	(France) Monaco (3rd)	(Portugal) Benfica (3rd)	(Netherlands) PSV Eindhoven (2nd)	(Belgium) Union Saint-Gilloise (2nd)
Third qualifying round	LP	(Austria) Sturm Graz (2nd)	(Scotland) Rangers (2nd)		
Second qualifying round	CH	(Czech Republic) Viktoria Plzeň (1st)	(Croatia) Dinamo Zagreb (1st)	(Switzerland) Zürich (1st)	(Greece) Olympiacos (1st)
Second qualifying round	CH	(Israel) Maccabi Haifa (1st)			
Second qualifying round	LP	(Ukraine) Dynamo Kyiv (Abd-2nd)	(Turkey) Fenerbahçe (2nd)	(Denmark) Midtjylland (2nd)	(Cyprus) AEK Larnaca (2nd)
First qualifying round		(Norway) Bodø/Glimt (1st)	(Sweden) Malmö FF (1st)	(Bulgaria) Ludogorets Razgrad (1st)	(Romania) CFR Cluj (1st)
First qualifying round		(Azerbaijan) Qarabağ (1st)	(Kazakhstan) Tobol (1st)	(Hungary) Ferencváros (1st)	(Belarus) Shakhtyor Soligorsk (1st)
First qualifying round		(Poland) Lech Poznań (1st)	(Slovenia) Maribor (1st)	(Slovakia) Slovan Bratislava (1st)	(Lithuania) Žalgiris (1st)
First qualifying round		(Luxembourg) F91 Dudelange (1st)	(Bosnia and Herzegovina) Zrinjski Mostar (1st)	(Republic of Ireland) Shamrock Rovers (1st)	(North Macedonia) Shkupi (1st)
First qualifying round		(Armenia) Pyunik (1st)	(Latvia) RFS (1st)	(Albania) Tirana (1st)	(Northern Ireland) Linfield (1st)
First qualifying round		(Georgia (country)) Dinamo Batumi (1st)	(Finland) HJK (1st)	(Moldova) Sheriff Tiraspol (1st)	(Malta) Hibernians (1st)
First qualifying round		(Faroe Islands) KÍ (1st)	(Kosovo) Ballkani (1st)	(Gibraltar) Lincoln Red Imps (1st)	(Montenegro) Sutjeska (1st)
First qualifying round		(Wales) The New Saints (1st)			
Preliminary round		(Iceland) Víkingur Reykjavík (1st)	(Estonia) FCI Levadia (1st)	(Andorra) Inter Club d'Escaldes (1st)	(San Marino) La Fiorita (1st)

Notes

1. Liechtenstein (LIE): The seven teams affiliated with the Liechtenstein Football Association (LFV) all played in the Swiss football league system. The only competition organised by the LFV was the Liechtenstein Football Cup – the winners of which qualified for the UEFA Europa Conference League.
2. Russia (RUS): On 28 February 2022, Russian football clubs and national teams were suspended from FIFA and UEFA competitions due to the Russian invasion of Ukraine. On 2 May 2022, UEFA confirmed that Russian clubs would be excluded from the 2022–23 UEFA competitions.
3. Ukraine (UKR): The 2021–22 Ukrainian Premier League was abandoned due to the Russian invasion of Ukraine. The top two teams of the league at the time of the abandonment (Shakhtar Donetsk and Dynamo Kyiv) were selected to play in the 2022–23 UEFA Champions League by the Ukrainian Association of Football.

== Schedule ==
The schedule of the competition was as follows. All matches were played on Tuesdays and Wednesdays apart from the preliminary round final and the final. Scheduled kick-off times starting from the play-off round were 18:45 and 21:00 CEST/CET.

As the 2022 FIFA World Cup took place in Qatar between 20 November and 18 December 2022, the group stage commenced in the first week of September 2022 and concluded in the first week of November 2022 to make way for the World Cup.

The draws for the qualifying round started at 12:00 CEST/CET and were held at the UEFA headquarters in Nyon, Switzerland. The group stage draw took place in Istanbul, Turkey.

Schedule for 2022–23 UEFA Champions League
Phase	Round	Draw date	First leg	Second leg
Qualifying	Preliminary round	7 June 2022	21 June 2022 (semi-finals)	24 June 2022 (final)
Qualifying	First qualifying round	14 June 2022	5–6 July 2022	12–13 July 2022
Qualifying	Second qualifying round	15 June 2022	19–20 July 2022	26–27 July 2022
Qualifying	Third qualifying round	18 July 2022	2–3 August 2022	9 August 2022
Play-offs	Play-off round	2 August 2022	16–17 August 2022	23–24 August 2022
Group stage	Matchday 1	25 August 2022	6–7 September 2022	
Group stage	Matchday 2	25 August 2022	13–14 September 2022	
Group stage	Matchday 3	25 August 2022	4–5 October 2022	
Group stage	Matchday 4	25 August 2022	11–12 October 2022	
Group stage	Matchday 5	25 August 2022	25–26 October 2022	
Group stage	Matchday 6	25 August 2022	1–2 November 2022	
Knockout phase	Round of 16	7 November 2022	14–15 & 21–22 February 2023	7–8 & 14–15 March 2023
Knockout phase	Quarter-finals	17 March 2023	11–12 April 2023	18–19 April 2023
Knockout phase	Semi-finals	17 March 2023	9–10 May 2023	16–17 May 2023
Knockout phase	Final	17 March 2023	10 June 2023 at Atatürk Olympic Stadium, Istanbul	

== Qualifying rounds ==
=== Preliminary round ===
A total of four teams played in the preliminary round. Seeding of teams was based on their 2022 UEFA club coefficients, with two seeded teams and two unseeded teams in the semi-final round. The matches took place at Víkingsvöllur in Reykjavík, Iceland so the first team drawn in each tie in the semi-final round, and also the final round (between the two winners of the semi-finals, whose identity was not known at the time of draw), would be the "home" team for administrative purposes. The winner of the preliminary round final advanced to the first qualifying round. The losers of the semi-finals and final were transferred to the Europa Conference League Champions Path second qualifying round.

Team 1	Score	Team 2
Semi-final round
FCI Levadia (Estonia)	1–6	(Iceland) Víkingur Reykjavík
La Fiorita (San Marino)	1–2	(Andorra) Inter Club d'Escaldes
Final round
Inter Club d'Escaldes (Andorra)	0–1	(Iceland) Víkingur Reykjavík

=== First qualifying round ===
The draw for the first qualifying round was held on 14 June 2022. The first legs were played on 5 and 6 July, and the second legs were played on 12 and 13 July 2022.

The winners of the ties advanced to the Champions Path second qualifying round. The losers were transferred to the Europa Conference League Champions Path second qualifying round.

Team 1	Agg.	Team 2	1st leg	2nd leg
Pyunik (Armenia)	2–2 (4–3 p)	(Romania) CFR Cluj	0–0	2–2 (a.e.t.)
Maribor (Slovenia)	2–0 (Note: Losers drawn to receive a bye to the Europa Conference League third qualifying round.)	(Belarus) Shakhtyor Soligorsk	0–0	2–0
Ludogorets Razgrad (Bulgaria)	3–0	(Montenegro) Sutjeska	2–0	1–0
F91 Dudelange (Luxembourg)	3–1	(Albania) Tirana	1–0	2–1
Tobol (Kazakhstan)	1–5	(Hungary) Ferencváros	0–0	1–5
Malmö FF (Sweden)	6–5	(Iceland) Víkingur Reykjavík	3–2	3–3
Ballkani (Kosovo)	1–2	(Lithuania) Žalgiris	1–1	0–1 (a.e.t.)
HJK (Finland)	2–2 (5–4 p)	(Latvia) RFS	1–0	1–2 (a.e.t.)
Bodø/Glimt (Norway)	4–3	(Faroe Islands) KÍ	3–0	1–3
The New Saints (Wales)	1–2	(Northern Ireland) Linfield	1–0	0–2 (a.e.t.)
Shamrock Rovers (Republic of Ireland)	3–0	(Malta) Hibernians	3–0	0–0
Lech Poznań (Poland)	2–5	(Azerbaijan) Qarabağ	1–0	1–5
Shkupi (North Macedonia)	3–2	(Gibraltar) Lincoln Red Imps	3–0	0–2
Zrinjski Mostar (Bosnia and Herzegovina)	0–1	(Moldova) Sheriff Tiraspol	0–0	0–1
Slovan Bratislava (Slovakia)	2–1	(Georgia (country)) Dinamo Batumi	0–0	2–1 (a.e.t.)

=== Second qualifying round ===
The draw for the second qualifying round was held on 15 June 2022. The first legs were played on 19 and 20 July, and the second legs were played on 26 and 27 July 2022.

The winners of the ties advanced to the third qualifying round of their respective path. The Champions Path losers were transferred to the Europa League Champions Path third qualifying round, while the League Path losers were transferred to the Europa League Main Path third qualifying round.

Team 1	Agg.	Team 2	1st leg	2nd leg
Champions Path
Ferencváros (Hungary)	5–3	(Slovakia) Slovan Bratislava	1–2	4–1
Dinamo Zagreb (Croatia)	3–2	(North Macedonia) Shkupi	2–2	1–0
Qarabağ (Azerbaijan)	5–4	(Switzerland) Zürich	3–2	2–2 (a.e.t.)
HJK (Finland)	1–7	(Czech Republic) Viktoria Plzeň	1–2	0–5
Linfield (Northern Ireland)	1–8	(Norway) Bodø/Glimt	1–0	0–8
Žalgiris (Lithuania)	3–0	(Sweden) Malmö FF	1–0	2–0
Ludogorets Razgrad (Bulgaria)	4–2	(Republic of Ireland) Shamrock Rovers	3–0	1–2
Maribor (Slovenia)	0–1	(Moldova) Sheriff Tiraspol	0–0	0–1
Maccabi Haifa (Israel)	5–1	(Greece) Olympiacos	1–1	4–0
Pyunik (Armenia)	4–2	(Luxembourg) F91 Dudelange	0–1	4–1
League Path
Midtjylland (Denmark)	2–2 (4–3 p)	(Cyprus) AEK Larnaca	1–1	1–1 (a.e.t.)
Dynamo Kyiv (Ukraine)	2–1	(Turkey) Fenerbahçe	0–0	2–1 (a.e.t.)

=== Third qualifying round ===
The draw for the third qualifying round was held on 18 July 2022. The first legs were played on 2 and 3 August, and the second legs were played on 9 August 2022.

The winners of the ties advanced to the play-off round of their respective path. The Champions Path losers were transferred to the Europa League play-off round, while the League Path losers were transferred to the Europa League group stage.

Team 1	Agg.	Team 2	1st leg	2nd leg
Champions Path
Maccabi Haifa (Israel)	4–2	(Cyprus) Apollon Limassol	4–0	0–2
Qarabağ (Azerbaijan)	4–2	(Hungary) Ferencváros	1–1	3–1
Ludogorets Razgrad (Bulgaria)	3–6	(Croatia) Dinamo Zagreb	1–2	2–4
Sheriff Tiraspol (Moldova)	2–4	(Czech Republic) Viktoria Plzeň	1–2	1–2
Bodø/Glimt (Norway)	6–1	(Lithuania) Žalgiris	5–0	1–1
Red Star Belgrade (Serbia)	7–0	(Armenia) Pyunik	5–0	2–0
League Path
Monaco (France)	3–4	(Netherlands) PSV Eindhoven	1–1	2–3 (a.e.t.)
Dynamo Kyiv (Ukraine)	3–1	(Austria) Sturm Graz	1–0	2–1 (a.e.t.)
Union Saint-Gilloise (Belgium)	2–3	(Scotland) Rangers	2–0	0–3
Benfica (Portugal)	7–2	(Denmark) Midtjylland	4–1	3–1

== Play-off round ==
The draw for the play-off round was held on 2 August 2022. The first legs were played on 16 and 17 August, and the second legs were played on 23 and 24 August 2022.

The winners of the ties advanced to the group stage. The losers were transferred to the Europa League group stage.

Team 1	Agg.	Team 2	1st leg	2nd leg
Champions Path
Qarabağ (Azerbaijan)	1–2	(Czech Republic) Viktoria Plzeň	0–0	1–2
Bodø/Glimt (Norway)	2–4	(Croatia) Dinamo Zagreb	1–0	1–4 (a.e.t.)
Maccabi Haifa (Israel)	5–4	(Serbia) Red Star Belgrade	3–2	2–2
Copenhagen (Denmark)	2–1	(Turkey) Trabzonspor	2–1	0–0
League Path
Dynamo Kyiv (Ukraine)	0–5	(Portugal) Benfica	0–2	0–3
Rangers (Scotland)	3–2	(Netherlands) PSV Eindhoven	2–2	1–0

== Group stage ==
Location of teams of the 2022–23 UEFA Champions League group stage.
Brown: Group A; Red: Group B; Orange: Group C; Yellow: Group D;
Green: Group E; Blue: Group F; Purple: Group G; Pink: Group H.

The draw for the group stage was held on 25 August 2022. The 32 teams were drawn into eight groups of four. For the draw, the teams were seeded into four pots, each of eight teams, based on the following principles:

- Pot 1 contained the Champions League and Europa League title holders, and the champions of the top six associations based on their 2021 UEFA country coefficients. Since the Champions League title holders, Real Madrid, were also the champions of Association 2 (Spain), the champions of Association 7 (Netherlands), Ajax, were seeded into Pot 1.
- Pots 2, 3 and 4 contained the remaining teams, seeded based on their 2022 UEFA club coefficients.

Teams from the same association could not be drawn into the same group.

Eintracht Frankfurt made their debut appearance in the group stage (and first appearance in the European Cup since their loss in the 1960 final) after winning the 2021–22 UEFA Europa League and, as a result, this was the first time that five German clubs played in the group stage.

A total of 15 national associations were represented in the group stage. This season was the first since the 1995–96 edition in which a Turkish side failed to qualify for the group stage. It was also the first time since the 2007–08 season that two Scottish sides qualified for the group stage.

=== Group A ===
Pos	Team	Pld	W	D	L	GF	GA	GD	Pts	Qualification	NAP	LIV	AJX	RAN
1	(Italy) Napoli	6	5	0	1	20	6	+14	15 (Note: Tied on head-to-head points. Head-to-head goal difference: Napoli +1, Liverpool −1.)	Advance to knockout phase	—	4–1	4–2	3–0
2	(England) Liverpool	6	5	0	1	17	6	+11	15	Advance to knockout phase	2–0	—	2–1	2–0
3	(Netherlands) Ajax	6	2	0	4	11	16	−5	6	Transfer to Europa League	1–6	0–3	—	4–0
4	(Scotland) Rangers	6	0	0	6	2	22	−20	0		0–3	1–7	1–3	—

Source: UEFA

=== Group B ===
Pos	Team	Pld	W	D	L	GF	GA	GD	Pts	Qualification	POR	BRU	LEV	ATM
1	(Portugal) Porto	6	4	0	2	12	7	+5	12	Advance to knockout phase	—	0–4	2–0	2–1
2	(Belgium) Club Brugge	6	3	2	1	7	4	+3	11	Advance to knockout phase	0–4	—	1–0	2–0
3	(Germany) Bayer Leverkusen	6	1	2	3	4	8	−4	5 (Note: Head-to-head points: Bayer Leverkusen 4, Atlético Madrid 1.)	Transfer to Europa League	0–3	0–0	—	2–0
4	(Spain) Atlético Madrid	6	1	2	3	5	9	−4	5		2–1	0–0	2–2	—

Source: UEFA

=== Group C ===
Pos	Team	Pld	W	D	L	GF	GA	GD	Pts	Qualification	BAY	INT	BAR	PLZ
1	(Germany) Bayern Munich	6	6	0	0	18	2	+16	18	Advance to knockout phase	—	2–0	2–0	5–0
2	(Italy) Inter Milan	6	3	1	2	10	7	+3	10	Advance to knockout phase	0–2	—	1–0	4–0
3	(Spain) Barcelona	6	2	1	3	12	12	0	7	Transfer to Europa League	0–3	3–3	—	5–1
4	(Czech Republic) Viktoria Plzeň	6	0	0	6	5	24	−19	0		2–4	0–2	2–4	—

Source: UEFA

=== Group D ===
Pos	Team	Pld	W	D	L	GF	GA	GD	Pts	Qualification	TOT	FRA	SPO	MAR
1	(England) Tottenham Hotspur	6	3	2	1	8	6	+2	11	Advance to knockout phase	—	3–2	1–1	2–0
2	(Germany) Eintracht Frankfurt	6	3	1	2	7	8	−1	10	Advance to knockout phase	0–0	—	0–3	2–1
3	(Portugal) Sporting CP	6	2	1	3	8	9	−1	7	Transfer to Europa League	2–0	1–2	—	0–2
4	(France) Marseille	6	2	0	4	8	8	0	6		1–2	0–1	4–1	—

Source: UEFA

=== Group E ===
Pos	Team	Pld	W	D	L	GF	GA	GD	Pts	Qualification	CHE	MIL	SAL	DZG
1	(England) Chelsea	6	4	1	1	10	4	+6	13	Advance to knockout phase	—	3–0	1–1	2–1
2	(Italy) Milan	6	3	1	2	12	7	+5	10	Advance to knockout phase	0–2	—	4–0	3–1
3	(Austria) Red Bull Salzburg	6	1	3	2	5	9	−4	6	Transfer to Europa League	1–2	1–1	—	1–0
4	(Croatia) Dinamo Zagreb	6	1	1	4	4	11	−7	4		1–0	0–4	1–1	—

Source: UEFA

=== Group F ===
Pos	Team	Pld	W	D	L	GF	GA	GD	Pts	Qualification	RMA	RBL	SHK	CEL
1	(Spain) Real Madrid	6	4	1	1	15	6	+9	13	Advance to knockout phase	—	2–0	2–1	5–1
2	(Germany) RB Leipzig	6	4	0	2	13	9	+4	12	Advance to knockout phase	3–2	—	1–4	3–1
3	(Ukraine) Shakhtar Donetsk	6	1	3	2	8	10	−2	6	Transfer to Europa League	1–1	0–4	—	1–1
4	(Scotland) Celtic	6	0	2	4	4	15	−11	2		0–3	0–2	1–1	—

Source: UEFA

=== Group G ===
Pos	Team	Pld	W	D	L	GF	GA	GD	Pts	Qualification	MCI	DOR	SEV	CPH
1	(England) Manchester City	6	4	2	0	14	2	+12	14	Advance to knockout phase	—	2–1	3–1	5–0
2	(Germany) Borussia Dortmund	6	2	3	1	10	5	+5	9	Advance to knockout phase	0–0	—	1–1	3–0
3	(Spain) Sevilla	6	1	2	3	6	12	−6	5	Transfer to Europa League	0–4	1–4	—	3–0
4	(Denmark) Copenhagen	6	0	3	3	1	12	−11	3		0–0	1–1	0–0	—

Source: UEFA

=== Group H ===
Pos	Team	Pld	W	D	L	GF	GA	GD	Pts	Qualification	BEN	PAR	JUV	MHA
1	(Portugal) Benfica	6	4	2	0	16	7	+9	14 (Note: Tied on head-to-head results, overall goal difference and overall goals scored. Overall away goals scored: Benfica 9, Paris Saint-Germain 6.)	Advance to knockout phase	—	1–1	4–3	2–0
2	(France) Paris Saint-Germain	6	4	2	0	16	7	+9	14	Advance to knockout phase	1–1	—	2–1	7–2
3	(Italy) Juventus	6	1	0	5	9	13	−4	3 (Note: Tied on head-to-head results. Overall goal difference is used as the tiebreaker.)	Transfer to Europa League	1–2	1–2	—	3–1
4	(Israel) Maccabi Haifa	6	1	0	5	7	21	−14	3		1–6	1–3	2–0	—

Source: UEFA

== Knockout phase ==
In the knockout phase, teams played against each other over two legs on a home-and-away basis, except for the one-match final. The mechanism of the draws for each round was as follows:

- In the draw for the round of 16, the eight group winners were seeded, and the eight group runners-up were unseeded. The seeded teams were drawn against the unseeded teams, with the seeded teams hosting the second leg. Teams from the same group or the same association cannot be drawn against each other.
- In the draws for the quarter-finals onwards, there were no seedings, and teams from the same group or the same association could be drawn against each other. As the draws for the quarter-finals and semi-finals were held together before the quarter-finals were played, the identity of the quarter-final winners was not known at the time of the semi-final draw. A draw was also held to determine which semi-final winner was designated as the "home" team for the final (for administrative purposes as it was played at a neutral venue).

=== Bracket ===
Round of 16
(England) Liverpool	2	0	2
(Spain) Real Madrid	5	1	6
(Germany) Borussia Dortmund	1	0	1
(England) Chelsea	0	2	2
(Germany) RB Leipzig	1	0	1
(England) Manchester City	1	7	8
(France) Paris Saint-Germain	0	0	0
(Germany) Bayern Munich	1	2	3
(Italy) Milan	1	0	1
(England) Tottenham Hotspur	0	0	0
(Germany) Eintracht Frankfurt	0	0	0
(Italy) Napoli	2	3	5
(Belgium) Club Brugge	0	1	1
(Portugal) Benfica	2	5	7
(Italy) Inter Milan	1	0	1
(Portugal) Porto	0	0	0

Quarter-finals
(Spain) Real Madrid	2	2	4
(England) Chelsea	0	0	0
(England) Manchester City	3	1	4
(Germany) Bayern Munich	0	1	1
(Italy) Milan	1	1	2
(Italy) Napoli	0	1	1
(Portugal) Benfica	0	3	3
(Italy) Inter Milan	2	3	5

Semi-finals
(Spain) Real Madrid	1	0	1
(England) Manchester City	1	4	5
(Italy) Milan	0	0	0
(Italy) Inter Milan	2	1	3

Final
10 June – Istanbul
(England) Manchester City	1
(Italy) Inter Milan	0

=== Round of 16 ===
The draw for the round of 16 was held on 7 November 2022, 12:00 CET. The first legs were played on 14, 15, 21 and 22 February, and the second legs were played on 7, 8, 14 and 15 March 2023.

Team 1	Agg.	Team 2	1st leg	2nd leg
RB Leipzig (Germany)	1–8	(England) Manchester City	1–1	0–7
Club Brugge (Belgium)	1–7	(Portugal) Benfica	0–2	1–5
Liverpool (England)	2–6	(Spain) Real Madrid	2–5	0–1
Milan (Italy)	1–0	(England) Tottenham Hotspur	1–0	0–0
Eintracht Frankfurt (Germany)	0–5	(Italy) Napoli	0–2	0–3
Borussia Dortmund (Germany)	1–2	(England) Chelsea	1–0	0–2
Inter Milan (Italy)	1–0	(Portugal) Porto	1–0	0–0
Paris Saint-Germain (France)	0–3	(Germany) Bayern Munich	0–1	0–2

=== Quarter-finals ===
The draw for the quarter-finals was held on 17 March 2023, 12:00 CET. The first legs were played on 11 and 12 April, and the second legs were played on 18 and 19 April 2023.

Team 1	Agg.	Team 2	1st leg	2nd leg
Real Madrid (Spain)	4–0	(England) Chelsea	2–0	2–0
Benfica (Portugal)	3–5 (Note: Order of legs reversed after original draw.)	(Italy) Inter Milan	0–2	3–3
Manchester City (England)	4–1	(Germany) Bayern Munich	3–0	1–1
Milan (Italy)	2–1	(Italy) Napoli	1–0	1–1

=== Semi-finals ===
The draw for the semi-finals was held on 17 March 2023, 12:00 CET, after the quarter-final draw. The first legs were played on 9 and 10 May, and the second legs were played on 16 and 17 May 2023.

Team 1	Agg.	Team 2	1st leg	2nd leg
Milan (Italy)	0–3	(Italy) Inter Milan	0–2	0–1
Real Madrid (Spain)	1–5	(England) Manchester City	1–1	0–4

=== Final ===
The final was played on 10 June 2023 at the Atatürk Olympic Stadium in Istanbul. A draw was held on 17 March 2023, after the quarter-final and semi-final draws, to determine the "home" team for administrative purposes.

10 June 2023
22:00 UTC+3

Manchester City (The Football Association)	1–0	(Italian Football Federation) Inter Milan
Rodri 68'	Report

Atatürk Olympic Stadium, Istanbul
Attendance: 71,412
Referee: Szymon Marciniak (Poland)

== Statistics ==
Statistics exclude qualifying rounds and play-off round.

=== Top goalscorers ===
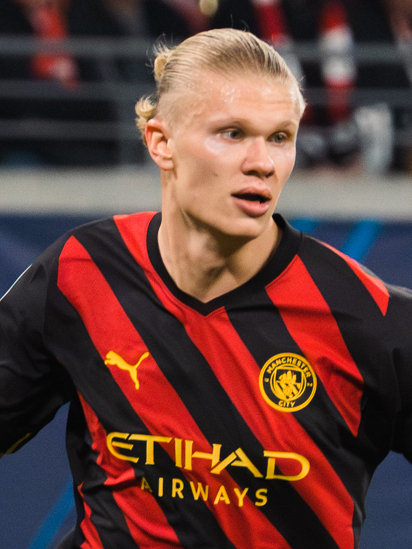
Manchester City forward Erling Haaland was the tournament's top scorer with 12 goals.

Rank	Player	Team	Goals	Minutes played
1	(Norway) Erling Haaland	(England) Manchester City	12	845
2	(Egypt) Mohamed Salah	(England) Liverpool	8	624
3	(France) Kylian Mbappé	(France) Paris Saint-Germain	7	651
3	(Brazil) Vinícius Júnior	(Spain) Real Madrid	7	975
5	(Portugal) João Mário	(Portugal) Benfica	6	865
6	(Nigeria) Victor Osimhen	(Italy) Napoli	5	424
6	(Poland) Robert Lewandowski	(Spain) Barcelona	5	442
6	(Iran) Mehdi Taremi	(Portugal) Porto	5	613
6	(Brazil) Rodrygo	(Spain) Real Madrid	5	824
6	(Portugal) Rafa Silva	(Portugal) Benfica	5	826
6	(France) Olivier Giroud	(Italy) Milan	5	939

=== Team of the season ===
The UEFA technical study group selected the following players as the team of the tournament.

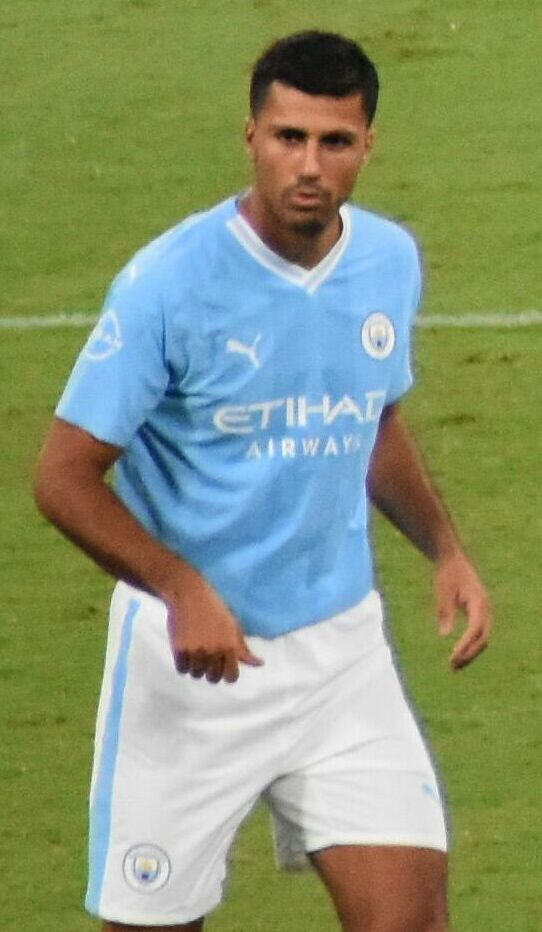
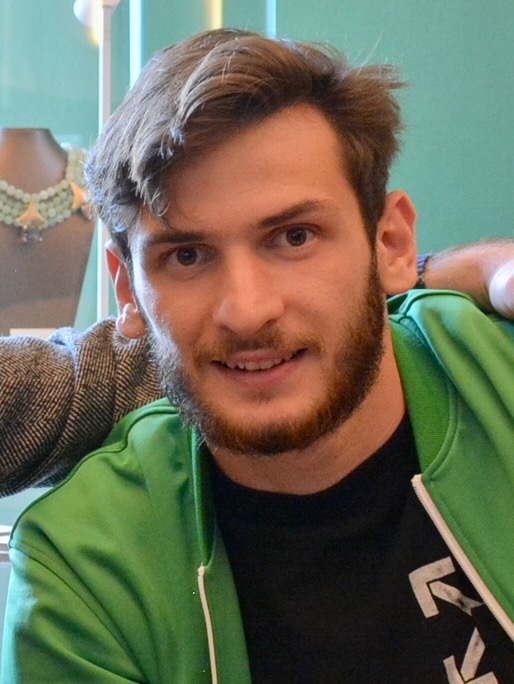
Manchester City midfielder Rodri (left) was named the Champions League Player of the Season, while Napoli forward Khvicha Kvaratskhelia (right) was named the Young Player of the Season.

Pos.	Player	Team
GK	(Belgium) Thibaut Courtois	(Spain) Real Madrid
DF	(England) Kyle Walker	(England) Manchester City
DF	(Portugal) Rúben Dias	(England) Manchester City
DF	(Italy) Alessandro Bastoni	(Italy) Inter Milan
DF	(Italy) Federico Dimarco	(Italy) Inter Milan
MF	(England) John Stones	(England) Manchester City
MF	(Belgium) Kevin De Bruyne	(England) Manchester City
MF	(Spain) Rodri	(England) Manchester City
FW	(Portugal) Bernardo Silva	(England) Manchester City
FW	(Norway) Erling Haaland	(England) Manchester City
FW	(Brazil) Vinícius Júnior	(Spain) Real Madrid

=== Player of the Season ===
- (Spain) Rodri ( (England) Manchester City)

=== Young Player of the Season ===
- (Georgia (country)) Khvicha Kvaratskhelia ( (Italy) Napoli)

== See also ==
- 2022–23 UEFA Europa League
- 2022–23 UEFA Europa Conference League
- 2023 UEFA Super Cup
- 2022–23 UEFA Women's Champions League
- 2022–23 UEFA Youth League
