= 2022–23 UEFA Europa League qualifying =

Union of European Football Associations matches

The 2022–23 UEFA Europa League qualifying phase and play-off round began on 4 August and ended on 25 August 2022.

A total of 28 teams competed in the qualifying system of the 2022–23 UEFA Europa League, which included the qualifying phase, with 10 teams in Champions Path and six teams in Main Path, and the play-off round. The 10 winners in the play-off round advanced to the group stage, to join the 12 teams that entered in the group stage, the six losers of the Champions League play-off round (four from Champions Path and two from League Path), and the four League Path losers of the Champions League third qualifying round.

Times are CEST (UTC+2), as listed by UEFA (local times, if different, are in parentheses).

== Teams ==
In the third qualifying round, the teams were divided into two paths:

- Champions Path (10 teams): 10 teams which entered this round (10 losers of the Champions League Champions Path second qualifying round).
- Main Path (4 teams): 4 teams which entered this round (including 2 losers of the Champions League League Path second qualifying round).

The winners of the third qualifying round were combined into a single path for the play-off round:

- Play-off round (20 teams): 13 teams which entered this round (including 6 losers of the Champions League Champions Path third qualifying round), and 7 winners of the third qualifying round.

All teams eliminated from the qualifying phase and play-off round entered the Europa Conference League:

- The 5 losers of the Champions Path third qualifying round entered the Champions Path play-off round.
- The 2 losers of the Main Path third qualifying round entered the Main Path play-off round.
- The 10 losers of the play-off round entered the group stage.

Below are the participating teams (with their 2022 UEFA club coefficients, not to be used as seeding for qualifying phase and play-off round, however), grouped by their starting rounds.

Key to colours
Winners of play-off round advance to group stage
Losers of play-off round enter Europa Conference League group stage
Losers of third qualifying round enter Europa Conference League play-off round

Play-off round
Team	Coeff.
(Belgium) Gent	27.500
(Bulgaria) Ludogorets Razgrad	23.000
(Moldova) Sheriff Tiraspol	22.500
(Hungary) Ferencváros	15.500
(Cyprus) Apollon Limassol	14.000
(Lithuania) Žalgiris	8.000
Austria Wien	7.770
(Scotland) Heart of Midlothian	7.380
(Cyprus) Omonia	7.000
(Turkey) Sivasspor	6.500
(Ukraine) Dnipro-1	6.360
(Denmark) Silkeborg	5.435
(Armenia) Pyunik	4.250

Third qualifying round (Champions Path)
Team	Coeff.
(Greece) Olympiacos	41.000
(Sweden) Malmö FF	23.500
(Slovenia) Maribor	14.000
(Slovakia) Slovan Bratislava	13.000
(Finland) HJK	8.500
(Luxembourg) F91 Dudelange	8.500
(Northern Ireland) Linfield	7.000
(Republic of Ireland) Shamrock Rovers	7.000
(Switzerland) Zürich	7.000
(North Macedonia) Shkupi	4.500

Third qualifying round (Main Path)
Team	Coeff.
(Serbia) Partizan	24.500
(Turkey) Fenerbahçe	14.500
(Cyprus) AEK Larnaca	7.500
(Czech Republic) Slovácko	5.560

Notes

1. ^{CH Q3} Losers of Champions League third qualifying round (Champions Path).
2. ^{CH Q2} Losers of Champions League second qualifying round (Champions Path).
3. ^{LP Q2} Losers of Champions League second qualifying round (League Path).

== Format ==
Each tie was played over two legs, with each team playing one leg at home. The team that scored more goals on aggregate over the two legs advance to the next round. If the aggregate score was level at the end of normal time of the second leg, extra time was played, and if the same number of goals were scored by both teams during extra time, the tie was decided by a penalty shoot-out.

== Schedule ==
The schedule of the competition was as follows (all draws were held at the UEFA headquarters in Nyon, Switzerland).

Schedule for the qualifying phase of the 2022–23 UEFA Europa League
Round	Draw date	First leg	Second leg
Third qualifying round	18 July 2022	4 August 2022	11 August 2022
Play-offs	2 August 2022	18 August 2022	25 August 2022

== Third qualifying round ==
The draw for the third qualifying round was held on 18 July 2022.

=== Seeding ===
A total of 14 teams played in the qualifying round. They were divided into two paths:

- Champions Path (10 teams): 10 losers of the 2022–23 UEFA Champions League second qualifying round (Champions Path), whose identity was not known at the time of draw. There was no seeding.
- Main Path (4 teams): The teams were seeded as follows:
  - Seeded: 2 teams which entered in this round.
  - Unseeded: 2 losers of the 2022–23 UEFA Champions League second qualifying round (League Path), whose identity was not known at the time of draw.

Teams from the same association could not be drawn against each other. The first team drawn in each tie was the home team of the first leg.

Champions Path
- (Slovakia) Slovan Bratislava
- (North Macedonia) Shkupi
- (Switzerland) Zürich
- (Finland) HJK
- (Northern Ireland) Linfield
- (Sweden) Malmö FF
- (Republic of Ireland) Shamrock Rovers
- (Slovenia) Maribor
- (Greece) Olympiacos
- (Luxembourg) F91 Dudelange

Main Path
Seeded	Unseeded
(Serbia) Partizan; (Czech Republic) Slovácko	(Cyprus) AEK Larnaca; (Turkey) Fenerbahçe

=== Summary ===
The first legs were played on 4 August, and the second legs were played on 9 and 11 August 2022.

The winners of the ties advanced to the play-off round. The losers were transferred to the Europa Conference League play-off round of their respective path.

Team 1	Agg.	Team 2	1st leg	2nd leg
Champions Path
Malmö FF (Sweden)	5–2	(Luxembourg) F91 Dudelange	3–0	2–2
Shamrock Rovers (Republic of Ireland)	5–2	(North Macedonia) Shkupi	3–1	2–1
Linfield (Northern Ireland)	0–5	(Switzerland) Zürich	0–2	0–3
Olympiacos (Greece)	3–3 (4–3 p)	(Slovakia) Slovan Bratislava	1–1	2–2 (a.e.t.)
Maribor (Slovenia)	0–3	(Finland) HJK	0–2	0–1
Main Path
AEK Larnaca (Cyprus)	4–3	(Serbia) Partizan	2–1	2–2
Fenerbahçe (Turkey)	4–1	(Czech Republic) Slovácko	3–0	1–1

=== Champions Path matches ===
4 August 2022
19:00

Malmö FF (Sweden)	3–0	(Luxembourg) F91 Dudelange
Kiese Thelin 54'; Toivonen 81'; Birmančević 85'	Report

Eleda Stadion, Malmö
Attendance: 11,172
Referee: Enea Jorgji (Albania)
11 August 2022
20:00

F91 Dudelange (Luxembourg)	2–2	(Sweden) Malmö FF
Hadji 56'; Sinani 61'	Report	Buya Turay 50'; Toivonen 52'

Stade de Luxembourg, Luxembourg City (Note: F91 Dudelange played their home match at the Stade de Luxembourg, in Luxembourg City, instead of their regular stadium, the Stade Jos Nosbaum, in Dudelange, which did not meet UEFA requirements.)
Attendance: 898
Referee: Ricardo de Burgos Bengoetxea (Spain)

Malmö FF won 5–2 on aggregate.

4 August 2022
21:00 (20:00 UTC+1)

Shamrock Rovers (Republic of Ireland)	3–1	(North Macedonia) Shkupi
Burke 13' (pen.); Watts 29'; O'Neill 90+7'	Report	Queven 77'

Tallaght Stadium, Tallaght
Attendance: 6,455
Referee: Bartosz Frankowski (Poland)
9 August 2022
21:00

Shkupi (North Macedonia)	1–2	(Republic of Ireland) Shamrock Rovers
Adetunji 90+4'	Report	Gaffney 65'; Emakhu 85'

Toše Proeski Arena, Skopje (Note: Shkupi played their home matches at the Toše Proeski Arena, instead of their regular stadium, the Čair Stadium, which did not meet UEFA requirements.)
Attendance: 4,870
Referee: Aleksei Kulbakov (Belarus)

Shamrock Rovers won 5–2 on aggregate.

4 August 2022
20:45 (19:45 UTC+1)

Linfield (Northern Ireland)	0–2	(Switzerland) Zürich
	Report	Aiyegun 8'; Gnonto 64'

Windsor Park, Belfast
Attendance: 3,044
Referee: Marco Di Bello (Italy)
11 August 2022
19:00

Zürich (Switzerland)	3–0	(Northern Ireland) Linfield
Avdijaj 11', 26'; Santini 84'	Report

Letzigrund, Zürich
Attendance: 7,904
Referee: Harm Osmers (Germany)

Zürich won 5–0 on aggregate.

4 August 2022
21:00 (22:00 UTC+3)

Olympiacos (Greece)	1–1	(Slovakia) Slovan Bratislava
El-Arabi 86'	Report	Green 63'

Karaiskakis Stadium, Piraeus
Attendance: 15,585
Referee: Lawrence Visser (Belgium)
11 August 2022
20:30

Slovan Bratislava (Slovakia)	2–2 (a.e.t.)	(Greece) Olympiacos
Šaponjić 90+4'; Green 108'	Report	Zinckernagel 54'; A. Camara 101'
Penalties
Ramírez (penalty scored); Šaponjić (penalty scored); Kucka (penalty missed); Green (penalty scored); Chakvetadze (penalty missed)	3–4	(penalty missed) Kunde; (penalty scored) Bouchalakis; (penalty scored) Masouras; (penalty scored) Pipa; (penalty scored) Valbuena

Tehelné pole, Bratislava
Attendance: 18,133
Referee: Glenn Nyberg (Sweden)

3–3 on aggregate; Olympiacos won 4–3 on penalties.

4 August 2022
20:15

Maribor (Slovenia)	0–2	(Finland) HJK
	Report	Browne 47'; Radulović 64'

Ljudski vrt, Maribor
Attendance: 6,000
Referee: Georgi Kabakov (Bulgaria)
11 August 2022
18:00 (19:00 UTC+3)

HJK (Finland)	1–0	(Slovenia) Maribor
Hostikka 54'	Report

Bolt Arena, Helsinki
Attendance: 6,487
Referee: Tobias Stieler (Germany)

HJK won 3–0 on aggregate.

=== Main Path matches ===
4 August 2022
18:00 (19:00 UTC+3)

AEK Larnaca (Cyprus)	2–1	(Serbia) Partizan
García 34'; Miličević 70'	Report	Menig 18'

AEK Arena – Georgios Karapatakis, Larnaca
Attendance: 4,250
Referee: Andris Treimanis (Latvia)
11 August 2022
21:00

Partizan (Serbia)	2–2	(Cyprus) AEK Larnaca
Ricardo 24', 54'	Report	Gyurcsó 51'; Faraj 57'

Partizan Stadium, Belgrade
Attendance: 10,802
Referee: José María Sánchez Martínez (Spain)

AEK Larnaca won 4–3 on aggregate.

4 August 2022
19:00 (20:00 UTC+3)

Fenerbahçe (Turkey)	3–0	(Czech Republic) Slovácko
Mor 17'; Lincoln 45+2', 81'	Report

Şükrü Saracoğlu Stadium, Istanbul
Attendance: 35,536
Referee: João Pinheiro (Portugal)
11 August 2022
19:00

Slovácko (Czech Republic)	1–1	(Turkey) Fenerbahçe
Šašinka 58'	Report	Dursun 56'

Městský fotbalový stadion Miroslava Valenty, Uherské Hradiště
Attendance: 6,520
Referee: Nikola Dabanović (Montenegro)

Fenerbahçe won 4–1 on aggregate.

== Play-off round ==
The draw for the play-off round was held on 2 August 2022.

=== Seeding ===
A total of 20 teams played in the play-off round. The teams were seeded into four "priority groups":

- Priority 1: The 6 teams from the higher ranking association which entered in this round.
- Priority 2: 6 losers of the 2022–23 UEFA Champions League third qualifying round (Champions Path), whose identity was not known at the time of the draw
- Priority 3: 5 winners of the third qualifying round (Champions Path), whose identity was not known at the time of the draw
- Priority 4: The remaining team which entered in this round, and 2 winners of the third qualifying round (Main Path), whose identity was not known at the time of the draw

The procedure of the draw was as follows:

1. Three teams from Pot 1 (Priority 1) were paired with the three teams in Pot 4 (Priority 4).
2. The three remaining Pot 1 (Priority 1) teams were then paired with teams from Pot 3 (Priority 3).
3. The two remaining Pot 3 (Priority 3) teams were then paired with teams from Pot 2 (Priority 2).
4. The four remaining Pot 2 (Priority 2) balls were then drawn one after another to complete the ninth and tenth pairings (open draw).

Country protection was not applied. The first team drawn in each tie was the home team of the first leg.

Priority 1	Priority 2	Priority 3	Priority 4
(Belgium) Gent; Austria Wien; (Scotland) Heart of Midlothian; (Turkey) Sivasspor; (Ukraine) Dnipro-1; (Denmark) Silkeborg	(Cyprus) Apollon Limassol; (Hungary) Ferencváros; (Bulgaria) Ludogorets Razgrad; (Moldova) Sheriff Tiraspol; (Lithuania) Žalgiris; (Armenia) Pyunik	(Sweden) Malmö FF; (Republic of Ireland) Shamrock Rovers; (Switzerland) Zürich; (Greece) Olympiacos; (Finland) HJK	(Cyprus) Omonia; (Cyprus) AEK Larnaca; (Turkey) Fenerbahçe

=== Summary ===
The first legs were played on 18 August, and the second legs were played on 25 August 2022.

The winners of the ties advanced to the group stage. The losers were transferred to the Europa Conference League group stage.

Team 1	Agg.	Team 2	1st leg	2nd leg
Dnipro-1 (Ukraine)	1–5	(Cyprus) AEK Larnaca	1–2	0–3
Gent (Belgium)	0–4	(Cyprus) Omonia	0–2	0–2
Austria Wien	1–6	(Turkey) Fenerbahçe	0–2	1–4
Zürich (Switzerland)	3–1	(Scotland) Heart of Midlothian	2–1	1–0
HJK (Finland)	2–1	(Denmark) Silkeborg	1–0	1–1
Malmö FF (Sweden)	5–1	(Turkey) Sivasspor	3–1	2–0
Ferencváros (Hungary)	4–1	(Republic of Ireland) Shamrock Rovers	4–0	0–1
Apollon Limassol (Cyprus)	2–2 (1–3 p)	(Greece) Olympiacos	1–1	1–1 (a.e.t.)
Pyunik (Armenia)	0–0 (2–3 p)	(Moldova) Sheriff Tiraspol	0–0	0–0 (a.e.t.)
Ludogorets Razgrad (Bulgaria)	4–3	(Lithuania) Žalgiris	1–0	3–3 (a.e.t.)

=== Matches ===
18 August 2022
20:00

Dnipro-1 (Ukraine)	1–2	(Cyprus) AEK Larnaca
Svatok 90'	Report	Altman 16'; Miličević 29'

Košická futbalová aréna, Košice, Slovakia (Note: Due to the Russian invasion of Ukraine, Ukrainian teams were required to play their home matches at neutral venues until further notice.)
Attendance: 3,450
Referee: Tobias Stieler (Germany)
25 August 2022
18:00 (19:00 UTC+3)

AEK Larnaca (Cyprus)	3–0	(Ukraine) Dnipro-1
Gyurcsó 21'; Lopes 45'; Englezou 78'	Report

AEK Arena – Georgios Karapatakis, Larnaca
Attendance: 4,893
Referee: Davide Massa (Italy)

AEK Larnaca won 5–1 on aggregate.

18 August 2022
20:30

Gent (Belgium)	0–2	(Cyprus) Omonia
	Report	Charalampous 19'; Barker 76'

Ghelamco Arena, Ghent
Attendance: 10,496
Referee: Irfan Peljto (Bosnia and Herzegovina)
25 August 2022
19:00 (20:00 UTC+3)

Omonia (Cyprus)	2–0	(Belgium) Gent
Kakoullis 18'; Charalampous 36'	Report

GSP Stadium, Nicosia
Attendance: 17,002
Referee: Georgi Kabakov (Bulgaria)

Omonia won 4–0 on aggregate.

18 August 2022
21:00

Austria Wien	0–2	(Turkey) Fenerbahçe
	Report	King 8'; Dursun 89'

Franz Horr Stadium, Vienna
Attendance: 14,000
Referee: Daniel Siebert (Germany)
25 August 2022
19:00 (20:00 UTC+3)

Fenerbahçe (Turkey)	4–1	Austria Wien
Yüksek 12'; Kahveci 44', 70'; Yandaş 79'	Report	Da Graça 45+1'

Şükrü Saracoğlu Stadium, Istanbul
Attendance: 35,350
Referee: Jesús Gil Manzano (Spain)

Fenerbahçe won 6–1 on aggregate.

18 August 2022
19:00

Zürich (Switzerland)	2–1	(Scotland) Heart of Midlothian
Guerrero 32'; Džemaili 34'	Report	Shankland 22' (pen.)

Kybunpark, St. Gallen (Note: Zürich played their play-off round home match at Kybunpark in St. Gallen, instead of their regular stadium, Letzigrund, in Zürich, which was hosting a concert.)
Attendance: 7,958
Referee: Bartosz Frankowski (Poland)
25 August 2022
21:00 (20:00 UTC+1)

Heart of Midlothian (Scotland)	0–1	(Switzerland) Zürich
	Report	Rohner 80'

Tynecastle Park, Edinburgh
Attendance: 17,225
Referee: Lawrence Visser (Belgium)

Zürich won 3–1 on aggregate.

18 August 2022
18:00 (19:00 UTC+3)

HJK (Finland)	1–0	(Denmark) Silkeborg
Browne 79'	Report

Bolt Arena, Helsinki
Attendance: 8,237
Referee: João Pinheiro (Portugal)
25 August 2022
18:30

Silkeborg (Denmark)	1–1	(Finland) HJK
Felix 74'	Report	Abubakari 40'

Silkeborg Stadium, Silkeborg
Attendance: 6,334
Referee: Maurizio Mariani (Italy)

HJK won 2–1 on aggregate.

18 August 2022
19:00

Malmö FF (Sweden)	3–1	(Turkey) Sivasspor
Zeidan 18'; Christiansen 37'; Moisander 68'	Report	James 30'

Eleda Stadion, Malmö
Attendance: 12,167
Referee: Willie Collum (Scotland)
25 August 2022
19:00 (20:00 UTC+3)

Sivasspor (Turkey)	0–2	(Sweden) Malmö FF
	Report	Birmančević 76'; Kiese Thelin 90'

New Sivas 4 Eylül Stadium, Sivas
Attendance: 16,873
Referee: Srđan Jovanović (Serbia)

Malmö FF won 5–1 on aggregate.

18 August 2022
18:30

Ferencváros (Hungary)	4–0	(Republic of Ireland) Shamrock Rovers
Auzqui 13'; Traoré 35', 48'; Ćivić 90+3'	Report

Ferencváros Stadion, Budapest
Attendance: 15,239
Referee: Glenn Nyberg (Sweden)
25 August 2022
21:00 (20:00 UTC+1)

Shamrock Rovers (Republic of Ireland)	1–0	(Hungary) Ferencváros
Lyons 89'	Report

Tallaght Stadium, Tallaght
Attendance: 7,163
Referee: François Letexier (France)

Ferencváros won 4–1 on aggregate.

18 August 2022
19:00 (20:00 UTC+3)

Apollon Limassol (Cyprus)	1–1	(Greece) Olympiacos
Janga 18'	Report	Hwang I. 29'

GSP Stadium, Nicosia (Note: Apollon Limassol played their home match at the GSP Stadium in Nicosia, instead of their regular stadium, the Tsirio Stadium, in Limassol, which did not meet UEFA requirements.)
Attendance: 10,479
Referee: José María Sánchez Martínez (Spain)
25 August 2022
21:00 (22:00 UTC+3)

Olympiacos (Greece)	1–1 (a.e.t.)	(Cyprus) Apollon Limassol
Masouras 2'	Report	Pittas 90'
Penalties
M'Vila (penalty scored); De la Fuente (penalty scored); Pipa (penalty scored); Ranđelović (penalty missed)	3–1	(penalty missed) Kyriakou; (penalty scored) Pittas; (penalty missed) Ongenda; (penalty missed) Ba

Karaiskakis Stadium, Piraeus
Attendance: 20,054
Referee: Sandro Schärer (Switzerland)

2–2 on aggregate; Olympiacos won 3–1 on penalties.

18 August 2022
19:00 (21:00 UTC+4)

Pyunik (Armenia)	0–0	(Moldova) Sheriff Tiraspol
	Report

Vazgen Sargsyan Republican Stadium, Yerevan
Attendance: 9,000
Referee: Alejandro Hernández Hernández (Spain)
25 August 2022
19:00 (20:00 UTC+3)

Sheriff Tiraspol (Moldova)	0–0 (a.e.t.)	(Armenia) Pyunik
	Report
Penalties
Tejan (penalty scored); Ambri (penalty missed); Diop (penalty missed); Kpozo (penalty scored); Kiki (penalty missed); Radeljić (penalty scored)	3–2	(penalty missed) Harutyunyan; (penalty missed) Dashyan; (penalty missed) Zambrano; (penalty scored) Gareginyan; (penalty scored) Vakulenko; (penalty missed) Kovalenko

Zimbru Stadium, Chișinău (Note: Sheriff Tiraspol will play their home match at the Zimbru Stadium in Chișinău, instead of their regular stadium, the Sheriff Stadium, in Tiraspol, due to Transnistria's involvement in the Russian invasion of Ukraine.)
Attendance: 6,154
Referee: Andreas Ekberg (Sweden)

0–0 on aggregate; Sheriff Tiraspol won 3–2 on penalties.

18 August 2022
19:45 (20:45 UTC+3)

Ludogorets Razgrad (Bulgaria)	1–0	(Lithuania) Žalgiris
Tatomirović 2' (o.g.)	Report

Ludogorets Arena, Razgrad
Attendance: 4,951
Referee: Ivan Kružliak (Slovakia)
25 August 2022
18:00 (19:00 UTC+3)

Žalgiris (Lithuania)	3–3 (a.e.t.)	(Bulgaria) Ludogorets Razgrad
Ourega 1'; Buff 16'; Oliveira 63'	Report	Tissera 8', 57'; Verdon 120' (pen.)

LFF Stadium, Vilnius
Attendance: 4,601
Referee: Harm Osmers (Germany)

Ludogorets Razgrad won 4–3 on aggregate.
