= Dejvid Sinani =

Luxembourgish footballer

Dejvid Sinani Дејвид Синани
Personal information
- Date of birth: 2 April 1993 (age 33)
- Place of birth: Belgrade, Serbia, FR Yugoslavia
- Height: 1.85 m (6 ft 1 in)
- Position: Midfielder

Youth career
- –2011: FC Differdange 03

Senior career*
Years	Team	Apps	(Gls)
2011–2017	Differdange	56	(19)
2017–2018	US Mondorf-les-Bains	22	(3)
2018–2021	Fola Esch	64	(26)
2021–2023	Dudelange	55	(36)
2023–2024	Swift Hesperange	29	(8)

International career^{‡}
2013–2014	Luxembourg U21	6	(0)
2022–2023	Luxembourg	3	(0)
- * Club domestic league appearances and goals as of 31 May 2025 ‡ National team caps and goals as of 21 June 2023

Dejvid Sinani (Serbian Cyrillic: Дејвид Синани; born 2 April 1993) is a footballer who most recently played as a midfielder for Swift Hesperange. Born in Serbia, he is a Luxembourg international.

== Club career ==
Sinani started his career with Luxembourgish side Differdange, helping them win the 2013–14 Luxembourg Cup and 2014–15 Luxembourg Cup. In 2018, he signed for Fola in Luxembourg, helping them win the league. In 2021, Sinani signed for Luxembourgish top flight club F91, helping them win the league.

== International career ==
Sinani played six times for the Luxembourg U21 team between 2013 and 2014. He made his senior debut for D'Roud Léiwen in a friendly against Hungary on 17 November 2022 appearing in the starting lineup alongside his brother.

== Personal life ==
He is the older brother of Luxembourg international Danel Sinani. He is of Gorani origin.

== Career statistics ==
As of match played 20 June 2023

Luxembourg
Year	Apps	Goals
2022	1	0
2023	2	0
Total	3	0
