= Queven (footballer) =

Brazilian footballer (born 1998)

Personal information
- Full name: Queven da Silva Inácio
- Date of birth: 21 November 1998 (age 27)
- Place of birth: Palmeira d'Oeste, Brazil
- Height: 1.75 m (5 ft 9 in)
- Position: Midfielder

Team information
- Current team: Bali United
- Number: 88

Youth career
- –2014: Tanabi
- 2015–2017: Mirassol

Senior career*
Years	Team	Apps	(Gls)
2017–2019	Guarulhos	3	(0)
2017–2019	→ Kerkyra (loan)	2	(0)
2019	Atlético Três Corações	4	(0)
2020–2022	Monte Azul	16	(0)
2020–2021	→ Maringá (loan)	19	(1)
2021	→ Marcílio Dias (loan)	0	(0)
2021	→ Portuguesa (loan)	1	(0)
2022	→ Shkupi (loan)	14	(3)
2022–2023	Shkupi	41	(6)
2024–2025	Ballkani	33	(7)
2025–2026	Chonburi	20	(3)
2026–	Bali United	2	(1)
- * Club domestic league appearances and goals as of 12 September 2026

Queven da Silva Inácio (born 21 November 1998), simply known as Queven, is a Brazilian footballer who plays as a midfielder for Super League club Bali United.

== Career statistics ==
=== Club ===
As of 20 July 2022.

Club	Season	League			State League		Cup		Continental		Other		Total	
Club	Season	Division	Apps	Goals	Apps	Goals	Apps	Goals	Apps	Goals	Apps	Goals	Apps	Goals
Kerkyra (loan)	2017–18	Super League Greece	1	0	–		0	0	–		0	0	1	0
Kerkyra (loan)	2018–19	Football League	1	0	–		2 (Note: Appearances in the Greek Cup)	0	–		0	0	3	0
Kerkyra (loan)	Total		2	0	0	0	2	0	0	0	0	0	4	0
Atlético Três Corações	2019	–			4 (Note: Appearances in the Campeonato Mineiro Segunda Divisão)	0	0	0	–		0	0	4	0
Monte Azul	2020	–			16 (Note: Appearances in the Campeonato Paulista Segunda Divisão)	0	0	0	–		0	0	16	0
Monte Azul	2021	–			0	0	0	0	–		0	0	0	0
Monte Azul	2022	–			0	0	0	0	–		0	0	0	0
Monte Azul	Total		0	0	16	0	0	0	0	0	0	0	16	0
Maringá (loan)	2020	–			10 (Note: Appearances in the Campeonato Paranaense)	1	0	0	–		0	0	10	1
Maringá (loan)	2021	–			9	0	0	0	–		0	0	9	0
Maringá (loan)	Total		0	0	19	1	0	0	0	0	0	0	19	1
Portuguesa (loan)	2021	Série D	1	0	0	0	0	0	–		11 (Note: Appearances in the Copa Paulista)	1	12	1
Shkupi (loan)	2021–22	1. MFL	14	3	–		0	0	–		0	0	14	3
Shkupi	2022–23	1. MFL	0	0	–		0	0	3 (Note: Appearances in UEFA Champions League qualification)	1	0	0	3	1
Shkupi	Total		14	3	0	0	0	0	3	1	0	0	17	4
Career total			17	3	39	1	2	0	3	1	11	1	72	6
