= Víkingsvöllur =

Football stadium in Reykjavík, Iceland

Coordinates: 64°06′59.0″N 21°51′18.5″W

- Home of Happiness
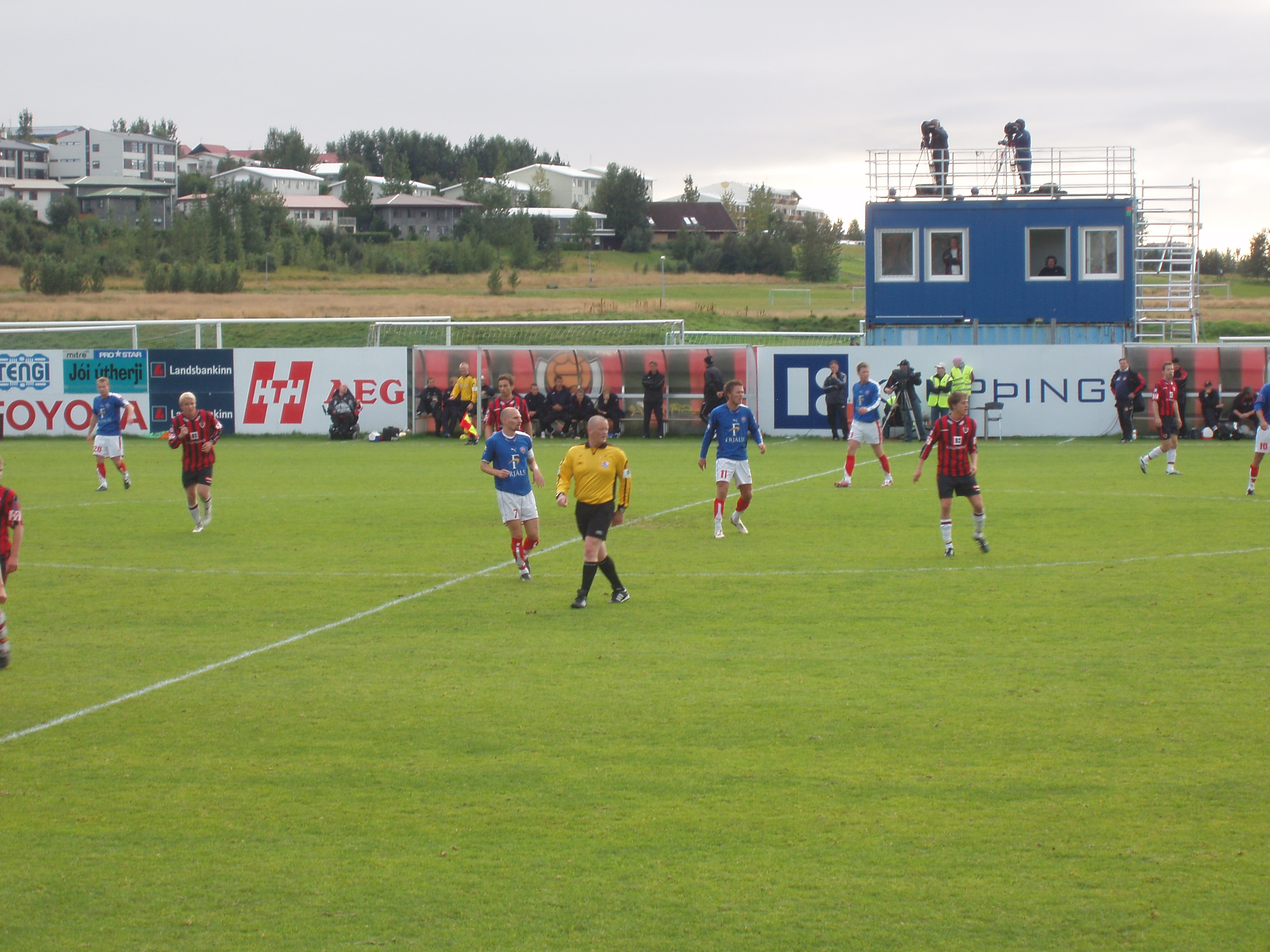
- Interactive map of Víkingsvöllur
- Location: Fossvogsdalur, Reykjavík, Iceland
- Owner: Víkingur
- Capacity: 1,149 (seats)
- Surface: Artificial grass

Construction
- Opened: 2001
- Renovated: 2019

Tenants
- Víkingur; BF 108

Víkingsvöllur (Icelandic pronunciation: [ˈviːciŋsˌvœtlʏr̥], lit. 'Víkingur Field' or more precisely 'Víkingur Stadium') is a football stadium in Reykjavík, Iceland. It is currently used for football matches and is the home ground of Víkingur F.C. The stadium holds around 2,000, with 1,149 seats, and is located at 'Traðarland' in Fossvogsdalur, south-east of the city center

== Stats ==
- Size:
- Record attendance: 2,023 tickets versus Leiknir Reykjavík, 2021
- Opening game:
