= 2025–26 NK Olimpija Ljubljana season =

NK Olimpija Ljubljana
2025–26 season
- Manager: Jorge Simão (13 June – 5 August); Senzen (caretaker) (5 August – 11 August); Erwin van de Looi (11 August – 22 September); Federico Bessone (22 September –)
- Stadium: Stožice Stadium
- Slovenian PrvaLiga: 4th
- UEFA Champions League: First qualifying round
- UEFA Conference League: Play-off round

The 2025–26 season is the 21st season in the history of NK Olimpija Ljubljana, and the club's 18th consecutive season in the Slovenian PrvaLiga. In addition to the domestic league, the team is scheduled to participate in the Slovenian Cup and the UEFA Champions League qualifications.

== First team ==
=== Management team ===
| Position | Staff | Staff #2 | Staff #3 | Staff #4 |
|---|---|---|---|---|
| Head coach | (Portugal) Jorge Simão | (Croatia) Ivan Senzen | (Netherlands) Erwin van de Looi | (Argentina) Fede Bessone |
| Assistant coach | (Portugal) João Correia | (Slovenia) A. D. Mlinar | (Netherlands) Marcel Groninger | (Spain) Enric Pi |
| Assistant coach | (Portugal) Fábio Nuno | | (Croatia) Ivan Senzen | (Croatia) Ivan Senzen |
| Goalkeeper coach | (Croatia) Josip Škorić | (Croatia) Josip Škorić | (Croatia) Josip Škorić | (Croatia) Josip Škorić |
| Athletic coach | (Croatia) Nikola Vidović | (Croatia) Nikola Vidović | (Croatia) Nikola Vidović | (Croatia) Nikola Vidović |
| Athletic coach | (Slovenia) Ažbe Ribič | (Slovenia) Ažbe Ribič | (Slovenia) Ažbe Ribič | (Slovenia) Ažbe Ribič |
| Athletic coach | (Croatia) Ivan Zorić | (Croatia) Ivan Zorić | (Croatia) Ivan Zorić | (Croatia) Ivan Zorić |
| Athletic coach | – | – | – | (Spain) Francisco Javier Núñez Roa |
| Video analyst | (Croatia) Ivan Damjanović | (Croatia) Ivan Damjanović | (Croatia) Ivan Damjanović | – |
| Physiotherapist | (Slovenia) Žiga Benko | (Slovenia) Žiga Benko | (Slovenia) Žiga Benko | (Slovenia) Žiga Benko |
| Physiotherapist | (Slovenia) Luka Levec | (Slovenia) Luka Levec | (Slovenia) Luka Levec | (Slovenia) Luka Levec |
| Physiotherapist | (Croatia) Riva Milić | (Croatia) Riva Milić | (Croatia) Riva Milić | (Croatia) Riva Milić |
| Technical Director | (Slovenia) Nejc Berce | | | |
| Kitman | (Slovenia) Branko Bučar | | | |
| Assistant Kitman | (Slovenia) Jože Vidergar | | | |

Source: NK Olimpija

== List of managers ==
Statistics correct as of 25 September 2025.

Key

- Includes competitive matches only.
- M = matches managed; W = matches won; D = matches drawn; L = matches lost; GF = goals for; GA = goals against; GD = goal difference; Win% = percentage of total matches won.

| Name | Nationality | From | To | Days | M | W | D | L | GF | GA | GD | Win% | Honours |
|---|---|---|---|---|---|---|---|---|---|---|---|---|---|
| Jorge Simão | Portugal | 13 June 2025 | 5 August 2025 | 53 | 7 | 3 | 2 | 2 | 10 | 11 | −1 | 42.86 | – |
| Ivan Senzen | Croatia | 5 August 2025 | 13 August 2025 | 8 | 2 | 1 | 1 | 0 | 3 | 1 | +2 | 50.00 | – |
| Erwin van de Looi | Netherlands | 13 August 2025 | 22 September 2025 | 40 | 8 | 2 | 1 | 5 | 13 | 18 | −5 | 25.00 | – |
| Federico Bessone | Argentina | 22 September 2025 | 29 May 2026 | 249 | 29 | 15 | 6 | 8 | 41 | 27 | +14 | 51.72 | – |

== Contracts and transfers ==
=== New contracts ===
| Date | Pos. | Player | Contract Type | Ref. |
|---|---|---|---|---|
| 26 July 2025 | DF | (Slovenia) Vall Janković | Contract extension (until summer 2027) | |
| 7 August 2025 | GK | (Slovenia) Matevž Vidovšek | Contract extension (until summer 2028) | |
| August 2025 | FW | (Bosnia and Herzegovina) Admir Bristrić | Contract extension (until summer 2028) | |
| 16 September 2025 | FW | (Brazil) Pedro Lucas | Contract extension (until summer 2027) | |
| 2 April 2026 | Manager | (Argentina) Federico Bessone | Contract extension (until summer 2028) | |
| 3 April 2026 | W | (Serbia) Nemanja Motika | Contract extension (until summer 2028) | |

=== Transfers in ===
| Date | Pos. | Player | From | Type | Fee | Ref. |
|---|---|---|---|---|---|---|
| 31 May 2025 | W | (Serbia) Nemanja Motika | (Germany) SpVgg Greuther Fürth | Return from loan | — | |
| 31 May 2025 | FW | (Bosnia and Herzegovina) Admir Bristrić | (Ukraine) FC Polissya Zhytomyr | Return from loan | — | |
| 12 June 2025 | DF | (Slovenia) Jošt Urbančič | (Norway) Viking FK | Transfer | Undisclosed | |
| 13 June 2025 | MF | (North Macedonia) Dimitar Mitrovski | (Croatia) Varaždin | Transfer | Undisclosed | |
| 13 June 2025 | DF | (Bulgaria) Veljko Jelenković | (Bulgaria) Slavia Sofia | Free Transfer | Undisclosed | |
| 13 June 2025 | DF | (Slovenia) Jan Gorenc | (Belgium) Eupen | Free Transfer | Undisclosed | |
| 19 June 2025 | RB | (Portugal) Diga | (Portugal) Feirense | Free Transfer | — | |
| 28 June 2025 | RB | (Togo) Frederic Ananou | (Germany) Jahn Regensburg | Free Transfer | — | |
| 28 June 2025 | GK | (Slovenia) Matevž Dajčar | (Italy) Atalanta U23 | Free Transfer | — | |
| 3 July 2025 | DF | (Croatia) Marat Žlibanović | (Bosnia and Herzegovina) GOŠK Gabela | Free Transfer | — | |
| 8 August 2025 | MF | (Benin) Mariano Ahouangbo | (Tunisia) Soliman | Free Transfer | — | |
| 30 August 2025 | MF | (Slovenia) Jasmin Kurtić | Without Club | Free Transfer | — | |
| 11 September 2025 | LB | (Ukraine) Danylo Malov | (Slovenia) Domžale | Free Transfer | — | |
| 15 January 2026 | RW | (Ghana) Kelvin Ofori | (Slovakia) Slovan Bratislava | Loan (until summer 2026) +buy option | — | |
| 16 January 2026 | MF | (Portugal) Bruno Lourenço | (Portugal) AVS Futebol SAD | Free Transfer | — | |
| 17 January 2026 | DF | (Croatia) Marat Žlibanović | (Slovenia) Ilirija | Return from loan | — | |

=== Transfers out ===
| Date | Pos. | Player | Moving to | Type | Fee | Ref. |
|---|---|---|---|---|---|---|
| 31 May 2025 | RB | (Lithuania) Justas Lasickas | (Croatia) Rijeka | End of contract | — | |
| 31 May 2025 | LB | (Portugal) David Sualehe | (Armenia) Noah | End of contract | — | |
| 1 June 2025 | DF | (Slovenia) Marcel Ratnik | (United Arab Emirates) Al Ain | Transfer | €2,200,000 | |
| 16 June 2025 | RB | (Portugal) Jorge Silva | (Azerbaijan) Turan Tovuz | End of contract | — | |
| 17 June 2025 | FW | (Austria) Raul Florucz | (Belgium) Royale Union Saint-Gilloise | Transfer | €5,500,000 | |
| 21 June 2025 | GK | (Slovenia) Denis Pintol | (Slovenia) Primorje | Loan | — | |
| 11 July 2025 | FW | (Slovenia) Aldin Jakupović | (Slovenia) Bravo | Released (mutual consent) | — | |
| 16 July 2025 | DF | (Slovenia) Vall Janković | (Slovenia) Slovan | Loan (until end season 25/26) | — | |
| 2 August 2025 | RW | (Slovenia) Tihomir Maksimović | (Slovenia) Triglav Kranj | Released (mutual consent) | — | |
| 21 August 2025 | FW | (Bosnia and Herzegovina) Admir Bristrić | (Slovenia) Bravo | Loan (until end season 25/26) | — | |
| 26 August 2025 | DF | (Croatia) Marat Žlibanović | (Slovenia) Ilirija | Loan | — | |
| 23 August 2025 | DF | (Spain) Manuel Pedreño | (Spain) Ibiza | Released (mutual consent) | — | |
| 10 September 2025 | DF | (Slovenia) Matej Dvoršak | (Slovenia) Radomlje | Released (mutual consent) | — | |
| 12 September 2025 | MF | (Nigeria) Peter Agba | (Israel) Maccabi Haifa | Transfer | €1,200,000 | |
| 31 December 2025 | GK | (Slovenia) Gal Lubej Fink | (Slovenia) Jadran Dekani | End of contract | — | |
| 1 January 2026 | MF | (Brazil) Thalisson | (Japan) Montedio Yamagata | Free Transfer | — | |
| 8 January 2026 | FW | (Estonia) Alex Tamm | (Scotland) Livingston | Loan (until summer 2026) | — | |
| 11 January 2026 | GK | (Slovenia) Denis Pintol | (Croatia) Vukovar 1991 | Loan (until summer 2026) | — | |
| 16 January 2026 | FW | (Croatia) Ivan Durdov | (Poland) Bruk-Bet Termalica Nieciecza | Transfer | Undisclosed | |
| 20 February 2026 | MF | (Benin) Mariano Ahouangbo | (Armenia) Gandzasar Kapan | Loan | — | |
| 20 February 2026 | DF | (Ukraine) Danylo Malov | (Armenia) Gandzasar Kapan | — | Undisclosed | |

== Friendlies ==
=== Pre-season ===
| 21 June 2025 Friendly | Olimpija Ljubljana (Slovenia) | 2–0 | (North Macedonia) Vardar | Radenci |
| 17:30 | Diogo Pinto 65'; Tamm 78' | Report | | Stadium: ŠRC Radenci |

| 25 June 2025 Friendly | Olimpija Ljubljana (Slovenia) | 3–3 | (Hungary) MTK Budapest FC | Radenci |
| | Muhamedbegović 10'; Durdov 46'; Motika 87' | Report | Kosznovszky 42'; Molnár 72'; Németh 80' | Stadium: ŠRC Radenci |

| 1 July 2025 Friendly | Olimpija Ljubljana (Slovenia) | 4–0 | (Albania) Vllaznia Shkodër | Ljubljana |
| | Tamm 16' 69'; Marin 41'; Durdov 76' | Report | | Stadium: Šiška Sports Park |

| 2 July 2025 Friendly | Olimpija Ljubljana (Slovenia) | 3–0 | (Bulgaria) PFC CSKA Sofia | Ljubljana |
| 19:00 | Aćimović 16'; Doffo 66'; Tamm 81' | Report | | Stadium: Šiška Sports Park |

=== In-season (2025) ===
| 9 July 2025 Friendly | Olimpija Ljubljana (Slovenia) | 2–2 | (Slovenia) Ilirija 1911 | Ljubljana |
| | Durdov | Report | Černe; Zulić | Stadium: Kodeljevo Sports Park |

| 14 November 2025 Friendly | Istra 1961 (Croatia) | 1–2 | (Slovenia) Olimpija Ljubljana | Peroj, Croatia |
| | Bangura 4' | Report | Marin 62'; Diogo Pinto 70' | Stadium: NK Peroj Stadium |

=== Mid-season ===
| 21 January 2026 Friendly | Olimpija Ljubljana (Slovenia) | 2–2 | (Spain) Badalona | Navata |
| | Pedro Lucas 22'; Mitrovski 40' | Report | | Stadium: TorreMirona Sport Center |

| 21 January 2026 Friendly | Olimpija Ljubljana (Slovenia) | Cancelled | (Andorra) Santa Coloma | Navata |
| | | | | Stadium: TorreMirona Sport Center |

=== In-season (2026) ===
| 15 February 2026 Friendly | Olimpija Ljubljana (Slovenia) | 2–1 | (Ukraine) FC Rukh Lviv | Čatež |
| | Alex Blanco 26'; Mitrovski 76' | Report | Denysov 79' |

| 27 March 2026 Friendly | Lokomotiva Zagreb (Croatia) | Cancelled | (Slovenia) Olimpija Ljubljana | Zagreb, Croatia |

== Competitions ==
=== Overview ===
| Competition | First match | Last match | Starting round | Final position | Record | | | | | | | |
| Competition | First match | Last match | Starting round | Final position | Pld | W | D | L | GF | GA | GD | Win % |
|---|---|---|---|---|---|---|---|---|---|---|---|---|
| Prva Liga Telemach | 19 July 2025 | 23 May 2026 | Matchday 1 | | 34 | 16 | 7 | 11 | 50 | 40 | +10 | 47.06 |
| Slovenian Cup | 24 September 2025 | 4 March 2026 | Second Round | Quarter-final | 4 | 3 | 0 | 1 | 4 | 2 | +2 | 75.00 |
| UEFA Champions League | 8 July 2025 | 15 July 2025 | First qualifying round | First qualifying round | 2 | 0 | 1 | 1 | 1 | 3 | −2 | 0.00 |
| Conference League | 23 July 2025 | 28 August 2025 | Second qualifying round | Play-off round | 6 | 2 | 2 | 2 | 12 | 12 | +0 | 33.33 |
| Total | | | | | 46 | 21 | 10 | 15 | 67 | 57 | +10 | 45.65 |

Last updated: 20 September 2025
Source: Soccerway

=== Prva Liga ===
==== League table ====
| Pos | Team | Pld | W | D | L | GF | GA | GD | Pts | Qualification or relegation |
|---|---|---|---|---|---|---|---|---|---|---|
| 2 | Koper | 34 | 20 | 7 | 7 | 71 | 43 | +28 | 67 | Qualification for the Conference League second qualifying round |
| 3 | Bravo | 34 | 19 | 5 | 10 | 62 | 51 | +11 | 62 | Qualification for the Conference League second qualifying round |
| 4 | Olimpija Ljubljana | 34 | 16 | 7 | 11 | 50 | 40 | +10 | 55 | |
| 5 | Maribor | 34 | 15 | 8 | 11 | 57 | 43 | +14 | 53 | |
| 6 | Radomlje | 34 | 13 | 6 | 15 | 50 | 63 | −13 | 45 | |

Source: PrvaLiga
Rules for classification: 1) Points; 2) Head-to-head points; 3) Head-to-head goal difference; 4) Head-to-head goals scored; 5) Goal difference; 6) Goals scored

==== Results summary ====
| Overall | | | | | | | | Home | | | | | | Away | | | | | |
| Pld | W | D | L | GF | GA | GD | Pts | W | D | L | GF | GA | GD | W | D | L | GF | GA | GD |
|---|---|---|---|---|---|---|---|---|---|---|---|---|---|---|---|---|---|---|---|
| 1 | 1 | 0 | 0 | 1 | 0 | +1 | 3 | 1 | 0 | 0 | 1 | 0 | +1 | 0 | 0 | 0 | 0 | 0 | 0 |

Last updated: 7 July 2025.
Source: Prva Liga Telemach

==== Results by round ====
| Round | 1 | 2 | 3 | 4 | 5 | 6 | 7 | 8 | 9 | 10 | 11 | 12 | 13 | 14 | 15 | 16 | 17 | 18 | 19 | 20 | 21 | 22 | 23 | 24 | 25 | 26 | 27 | 28 | 29 | 30 | 31 | 32 | 33 | 34 | 35 | 36 |
|---|---|---|---|---|---|---|---|---|---|---|---|---|---|---|---|---|---|---|---|---|---|---|---|---|---|---|---|---|---|---|---|---|---|---|---|---|
| Ground | H | A | H | A | H | A | H | A | H | A | H | A | H | A | H | A | H | A | H | A | H | | H | A | H | A | H | A | H | A | | A | H | A | H | A |
| Result | W | W | L | W | L | D | W | L | L | W | D | D | L | L | W | D | W | L | W | W | W | | D | W | D | W | L | D | W | L | | L | W | W | W | L |
| Position | 5 | 1 | 4 | 2 | 4 | 5 | 4 | 4 | 5 | 5 | 5 | 5 | 5 | 5 | 5 | 5 | 5 | 5 | 5 | 4 | 4 | 4 | 4 | 4 | 4 | 4 | 4 | 4 | 4 | 5 | 5 | 5 | 5 | 4 | 4 | 4 |

Updated to match(es) played on 23 July 2025. Source: Prva Liga Telemach
A = Away; H = Home; W = Win; D = Draw; L = Loss

==== Matches ====
| 19 July 2025 1 | Olimpija Ljubljana | 1–0 | Mura | Ljubljana |
| 20:15 CEST (UTC+02:00) | Marin 73'; Jelenković (yellow card) 45' | Report | Sana (yellow card) 46' | Stadium: Stožice Stadium; Attendance: 1,800; Referee: David Šmajc |

| 26 July 2025 2 | Aluminij | 0–3 | Olimpija Ljubljana | Kidričevo |
| 20:15 CEST (UTC+02:00) | Sule (yellow card) 21'; Svržnjak (yellow card) 26'; Kočar (yellow card) 77' | Report | Durdov 4'; Blanco 8'; Brest 23'; Gorenc (yellow card) 60' | Stadium: Aluminij Sports Park; Attendance: 1,000; Referee: Aleksandar Matković |

| 3 August 2025 3 | Olimpija Ljubljana | 0–5 | Celje | Ljubljana |
| 20:15 CEST (UTC+02:00) | Brest (yellow card) 57' | Report | Tutyškinas (yellow card) 18'; Kvesić 24'; Kovačević 45' 54'; Iosifov 64'; Šturm 71' | Stadium: Stožice Stadium; Attendance: 3,000; Referee: Alen Borošak |

| 10 August 2025 4 | Domžale | 1–3 | Olimpija Ljubljana | Domžale |
| 17:30 CEST (UTC+02:00) | Vučkić 53'; Kambič (yellow card) 46'; Lorber (yellow card) 88' | Report | Kojić (yellow card) 40' (goal) 51'; Diga (yellow card) 59'; Marin 64'; Agba (yellow card) 71'; Pinto 95' (pen.) | Stadium: Domžale Sports Park; Attendance: 1,100; Referee: Denis Halilović |

| 17 August 2025 5 | Olimpija Ljubljana | 1–3 | Koper | Ljubljana |
| 20:15 CEST (UTC+02:00) | Durdov 19'; Ananou (yellow card) 47' | Report | Tomek (yellow card) 49'; Sidibé 71'; Omladič (yellow card) 86'; Muhamedbegović 88' (o.g.); D. Jurić 91' | Stadium: Stožice Stadium; Attendance: 2,000; Referee: Slavko Vinčić |

| 24 August 2025 6 | Primorje | 1–1 | Olimpija Ljubljana | Ajdovščina |
| 17:30 CEST (UTC+02:00) | Murillo 49' (yellow card) 53'; Fogec (yellow card) 89' | Report | Pinto 48' (pen.); Muhamedbegović (yellow card) 60'; Marin (yellow card) 72' | Stadium: Ajdovščina City Stadium; Attendance: 900; Referee: Martin Matoša |

| 31 August 2025 7 | Olimpija Ljubljana | 1–0 | Maribor | Ljubljana |
| 20:15 CEST (UTC+02:00) | Urbančič 29'; Doffo (yellow card) 46'; Jelenković (yellow card) 73'; Dajčar (yellow card) 93' | Report | Viher (yellow card) 32'; Španring (yellow card) 36'; J. Repas (yellow card) 42'; Ojo (yellow card) 70'; Rekik (yellow card) 78'; Tetteh (yellow card) 92'; Mbina (yellow card) 93' (yellow-red card) 93' | Stadium: Stožice Stadium; Attendance: 5,500; Referee: Mihael Antič |

| 13 September 2025 8 | Kalcer Radomlje | 3–2 | Olimpija Ljubljana | Domžale |
| 17:30 CEST (UTC+02:00) | Pogačar (yellow card) 22'; Jojić 52'; Kukovec (yellow card) 61' (yellow-red card) 96'; Martinčič 78'; Gnjatić (yellow card) 54' (goal) 83' | Report | Durdov 23'; Pinto 36' (pen.); Jelenković (yellow card) 86' | Stadium: Domžale Sports Park; Attendance: 600; Referee: Rade Obrenović |

| 20 September 2025 9 | Olimpija Ljubljana | 1–2 | Bravo | Ljubljana |
| 17:30 CEST (UTC+02:00) | Marin 4' (yellow card) 89'; Diga (yellow card) 95' | Report | Atemona (yellow card) 32'; Pečar 28' 46'; Gidado (yellow card) 45'; Nzuzi (yellow card) 48'; Stanković (yellow card) 66'; Selan (yellow card) 78'; Nuhanović (yellow card) 89' | Stadium: Stožice Stadium; Attendance: 2,000; Referee: Alen Bubek |

| 28 September 2025 10 | Mura | 0–2 | Olimpija Ljubljana | Murska Sobota |
| 17:30 CET CEST (UTC+02:00) | Hofer (yellow card) 31'; Proleta (yellow card) 46'; Flis (yellow card) 91'; Bobičanec (yellow card) 91' | Report | Urbančič (yellow card) 14': Durdov 23'; Kojić 25'; Pedro Lucas (yellow card) 75'; Dajčar (yellow card) 81'; Jelenković (yellow card) 86'; Brest (yellow card) 90'; Çelhaka (yellow card) 94' | Stadium: Fazanerija City Stadium; Attendance: 2,307; Referee: Matej Jug |

| 3 October 2025 11 | Olimpija Ljubljana | 1–1 | Aluminij | Ljubljana |
| 20:15 CET (UTC+01:00) | Durdov 9'; Çelhaka (yellow card) 51'; Urbančič (yellow card) 56'; Brest (yellow card) 74' | Report | Sule (yellow card) 21'; Feta 42'; Simonič (yellow card) 68'; Schaubach (yellow card) 78'; Kosi (yellow card) 95' | Stadium: Stožice Stadium; Attendance: 2,000; Referee: Damjan Novarlić |

| 18 October 2025 12 | Celje | 0–0 | Olimpija Ljubljana | Celje |
| 20:15 CET (UTC+01:00) | Šturm (yellow card) 61'; Bejger (yellow card) 65'; Hrka (yellow card) 78'; Vuklišević (yellow card) 94' | Report | Pinto (yellow card) 23'; Urbančič (yellow card) 56'; Durdov (yellow card) 62'; Diga (yellow card) 67'; Doffo (yellow card) 90' | Stadium: Stadion Z'dežele; Attendance: 4,050; Referee: Slavko Vinčić |

| 26 October 2025 13 | Olimpija Ljubljana | 1–2 | Domžale | Ljubljana |
| 17:30 CET (UTC+01:00) | Mitrovski 22'; Aćimović (yellow card) 45'; Blanco (yellow card) 53'; Pedro Lucas (yellow card) 81'; Jelenković (yellow card) 88'; Doffo (yellow card) 96' | Report | Ehibe (yellow card) 10'; Kahvić 54'; Hrvatin 74'; Konstantinos (yellow card) 93' | Stadium: Stožice Stadium; Attendance: 1,500; Referee: Martin Matoša |

| 2 November 2025 14 | Koper | 1–0 | Olimpija Ljubljana | Koper |
| 15:00 CET (UTC+01:00) | Rimac (yellow card) 32'; Matondo (yellow card) 43' (goal) 67'; Manseri (yellow card) 59'; Iličić (yellow card) 89' | Report | Brest (yellow card) 36'; Urbančič (yellow card) 49'; Jelenković (yellow card) 96' | Stadium: Bonifika Stadium; Attendance: 1,500; Referee: Aleksandar Matković |

| 7 November 2025 15 | Olimpija Ljubljana | 2–0 | Primorje | Ljubljana |
| 20:15 CET (UTC+01:00) | Durdov 26'; Doffo (yellow card) 34'; Tamm 92'; Dajčar (yellow card) 94' | Report | Petek (yellow card) 29'; Melentijević (yellow card) 58' | Stadium: Stožice Stadium; Attendance: 1,500; Referee: Denis Halilović |

| 23 November 2025 16 | Maribor | 1–1 | Olimpija Ljubljana | Maribor |
| 15:00 CET (UTC+01:00) | Tetteh 21'; Viher (yellow card) 32'; Ojo (yellow card) 57'; Bajc (yellow card) 72'; Širvys (yellow card) 92' | Report | Brest (yellow card) 11'; Çelhaka (yellow card) 19'; Mitrovski (yellow card) 40'; Durdov 53'; Muhamedbegović (yellow card) 71' (yellow-red card) 79'; Pedro Lucas (yellow card) 88' | Stadium: Ljudski vrt Attendance: 8,900; Referee: Matej Jug |

| 29 November 2025 17 | Olimpija Ljubljana | 2–1 | Kalcer Radomlje | Ljubljana |
| 17:30 CET (UTC+01:00) | Gorenc 15', 59' (yellow card) 76' | Report | Žaler (yellow card) 14'; Pantić (yellow card) 49'; Klampfer (yellow card) 53'; Kukovec 77' (pen.); Gnjatić (yellow card) 93' | Stadium: Stožice Stadium; Attendance: 500; Referee: Bojan Mertik |

| 7 December 2024 18 | Bravo | 2–1 | Olimpija Ljubljana | Ljubljana |
| 17:30 CET (UTC+01:00) | Monzango 8'; Jakupović 56' (yellow card) 56'; Stanković (yellow card) 64' | Report | Çelhaka (yellow card) 55'; Brest 88'; Motika (yellow card) 93' | Stadium: Šiška Sports Park; Attendance: 720; Referee: Slavko Vinčić |

| 31 January 2026 19 | Olimpija Ljubljana | 1–0 | Mura | Ljubljana |
| 15:00 CET (UTC+01:00) | Pedro Lucas 11'; Doffo (red card) 87' | Report | Sana (yellow card) 93' | Stadium: Stožice Stadium; Attendance: 1,800; Referee: Alen Borošak |

| 5 February 2026 20 | Aluminij | 1–2 | Olimpija Ljubljana | Kidričevo |
| 15:00 CET (UTC+01:00) | Koderman (yellow card) 29'; Susso 37'; Zeljković (yellow card) 54'; Kočar (yellow card) 77' | Report | Marin 18'; Motika 31' (yellow card) 40'; Ananou (yellow card) 54'; Kurtić (yellow card) 65'; Mitrovski (yellow card) 77' | Stadium: Aluminij Sports Park; Attendance: 400; Referee: Aleksandar Matković |

| 8 February 2026 21 | Olimpija Ljubljana | 3–1 | Celje | Ljubljana |
| 15:00 CET (UTC+01:00) | Marin (yellow card) 27' (goal) 30'; Diga 45+1' (yellow card) 64'; Mitrovski (yellow card) 47'; Kojić 63'; Lourenço (yellow card) 73' | Report | Tutyškinas (yellow card) 16'; Iosifov (yellow card) 36'; Sešlar 70' (pen.) | Stadium: Stožice Stadium; Attendance: 2,161; Referee: Mateo Tozan |

| 21 February 2026 23 | Olimpija Ljubljana | 3–3 | Koper | Ljubljana |
| 15:00 CET (UTC+01:00) | Çelhaka (yellow card) 9'; Muhamedbegović 77'; Kojić 63'; Pedro Lucas 90+2' (pen.); Marin (yellow card) 90+7' | Report | Ruedl (yellow card) 27'; Tomek (yellow card) 37'; Oddei 45+1'; Mijailović (yellow card) 50'; Longonda 58'; N'Diaye 64'; Jurhar (yellow card) 90+5' | Stadium: Stožice Stadium; Attendance: 1,900; Referee: Denis Halilović |

| 28 February 2026 24 | Primorje | 0–2 | Olimpija Ljubljana | Ajdovščina |
| 15:00 CET (UTC+01:00) | Klemenčič (yellow card) 33'; Ficko (yellow card) 36'; Štor (yellow card) 44'; Bešir (yellow card) 68' | Report | Doffo (yellow card) 45'; Gorenc 59' (yellow card) 76'; Bešir 79' (o.g.); Urbančič (yellow card) 88'; Vidovšek (yellow card) 90+1' | Stadium: Ajdovščina City Stadium; Attendance: 850; Referee: Mihael Antič |

| 8 March 2026 25 | Olimpija Ljubljana | 0–0 | Maribor | Ljubljana |
| 15:00 CET (UTC+01:00) | Doffo (yellow card) 53' | Report | Seri (yellow card) 25'; Širvys (yellow card) 50'; Pejičić (yellow card) 57'; M'Bondo (yellow card) 69'; Cipot (yellow card) 90+5'; Bumbić (yellow card) 90+5' | Attendance: 6,700; Referee: David Šmajc |

| 14 March 2026 26 | Kalcer Radomlje | 1–2 | Olimpija Ljubljana | Domžale |
| 15:00 CET (UTC+01:00) | Martinčič 1'; Gnjatić (red card); Pogačar (yellow card) 56'; Graonić (yellow card) 71'; Marinič (yellow card) 78' | Report | Mitrovski 68'; Marin 83'; Pedro Lucas (yellow card) 88' | Stadium: Domžale Sports Park; Attendance: 750; Referee: Aleksandar Matković |

| 21 March 2026 27 | Olimpija Ljubljana | 1–2 | Bravo | Ljubljana |
| 20:15 CET (UTC+01:00) | Doffo (yellow card) 14'; Kojić 25'; Diga (yellow card) 38'; Ristić (yellow card) 65'; Gorenc (yellow card) 85'; Vidovšek (yellow card) 87' | Report | Fallou Faye 59'; Nzuzi (yellow card) 67'; Nuhanović 68'; Štravs (yellow card) 90+3' | Stadium: Stožice Stadium; Attendance: 1,680; Referee: Bojan Mertik |

| 4 April 2026 28 | Mura | 0–0 | Olimpija Ljubljana | Murska Sobota |
| 15:00 CET CEST (UTC+02:00) | Rose (yellow card) 14'; Flis (yellow card) 38'; Kurtović (yellow card) 46'; Kouter (yellow card) 54' | Report | Mitrovski (yellow card) 7'; Urbančič (yellow card) 30'; Gorenc (yellow card) 46'; Çelhaka (yellow card) 56'; Muhamedbegović (yellow card) 85' | Stadium: Fazanerija City Stadium; Attendance: 1,812; Referee: Mateo Tozan |

| 11 April 2026 29 | Olimpija Ljubljana | 2–1 | Aluminij | Ljubljana |
| 15:00 CET CEST (UTC+02:00) | Brest (yellow card) 40'; Blanco 62'; Marin 68' (pen.); Lourenço (yellow card) 90+1'; Diga (yellow card) 90+3' | Report | Svržnjak 65'; Mrežar (yellow card) 66'; Pejić 73' | Stadium: Stožice Stadium; Attendance: 1,115; Referee: Slavko Vinčić |

| 15 April 2026 30 | Celje | 2–0 | Olimpija Ljubljana | Celje |
| 18:30 CET CEST (UTC+02:00) | Tutyškinas (yellow card) 25'; Kučys 40'; Iosifov 49'; Sešlar (yellow card) 70'; Hrka (yellow card) 77'; Vuklišević (red card) 90+4'; Karničnik (yellow card) 90+4' | Report | Muhamedbegović (yellow card) 52'; Urbančič (yellow card) 54'; Gorenc (yellow card) 68'; Pedro Lucas (yellow card) 90+4' | Stadium: Stadion Z'dežele; Attendance: 3,260; Referee: Mihael Antič |

| 25 April 2026 32 | Koper | 3–2 | Olimpija Ljubljana | Koper |
| 20:15 CET (UTC+01:00) | Rimac 3'; Mijailović (yellow card) 4'; Pabai (yellow card) 8'; Iličić 40' 90+4'; Ndiaye 90+4' (pen.); Tomek (yellow card) 88' | Report | Urbančič (yellow card) 66'; Mitrovski 71'; Brest 84'; Gorenc (yellow card) 90+1' | Stadium: Bonifika Stadium; Attendance: 1,300; Referee: Slavko Vinčić |

=== Slovenian Cup (Pokal Pivovarna Union) ===
| 24 September 2025 Second round | Olimpija Ljubljana | 1–0 | Domžale | Ljubljana |
| 18:15 CEST (UTC+02:00) | Pedro Lucas 77'; Gorenc (yellow card) 74' | Report | Vujčić (yellow card) 6' | Stadium: Stožice Stadium; Attendance: 600; Referee: Denis Šabanagić |

| 29 October 2024 Round of 32 | Eltron Šenčur | 1–2 | Olimpija Ljubljana | Šenčur |
| 16:00 CEST (UTC+02:00) | Kurtić 86' (o.g.) | Report | Tamm 42'; Jelenković 80' | Stadium: Šenčur Sports Park; Attendance: 1,100; Referee: Jure Žagar |

| 4 December 2025 Round of 16 | Olimpija Ljubljana | 1–0 | Celje | Ljubljana |
| 18:00 CET (UTC+01:00) | Gorenc 52' | Report | | Stadium: Stožice Stadium; Attendance: 3,300; Referee: Mihael Antič |

| 4 March 2026 Quarter-finals | Brinje Grosuplje | 1–0 | Olimpija Ljubljana | Grosuplje |
| 20:00 CET (UTC+01:00) | Benkič 4'; Skrbin (yellow card) 12'; Kene (yellow card) 54'; Matko (yellow card) 78, 83' (yellow-red card) | Report | Doffo (yellow card) 30' | Stadium: Brinje Stadium; Attendance: 1,200; Referee: Rade Obrenović |

=== UEFA Champions League ===
==== First qualifying round ====
| 8 July 2025 First leg | Olimpija Ljubljana (Slovenia) | 1–1 | (Kazakhstan) Kairat | Ljubljana |
| 19:00 UTC+2 | Pinto 66' | Report | Satpayev 59' | Stadium: Stožice Stadium; Attendance: 4,877; Referee: Christos Vergetis (Greece) |

| 13 July 2025 Second leg | Kairat (Kazakhstan) | 2–0 (3–1 agg.) | (Slovenia) Olimpija Ljubljana | Almaty, Kazakhstan |
| 20:00 UTC+5 | Jorginho 5'; Mrynskiy 31' | Report | | Stadium: Almaty Central Stadium, Attendance: 22,800; Referee: Matteo Marchetti (Italy) |

=== UEFA Conference League ===
==== Second qualifying round ====
| 23 July 2025 First leg | Olimpija Ljubljana (Slovenia) | 4–2 | (Andorra) Inter Club d'Escaldes | Ljubljana |
| 20:00 UTC+2 | Diogo Pinto 55', 61', 65'; Muhamedbegović 80' | Report | Bollo 13'; Rafinha 50' | Stadium: Stožice Stadium; Attendance: 2,651; Referee: Marek Radina (Czech Republic) |

| 29 July 2025 Second leg | Inter Club d'Escaldes (Andorra) | 1–1 (3–5 agg.) | (Slovenia) Olimpija Ljubljana | Encamp, Andorra |
| 20:30 UTC+2 | Martín 55' | Report | Diogo Pinto 42' | Stadium: Estadi de la FAF; Attendance: 242; Referee: Lukasz Kuzma (Poland) |

==== Third qualifying round ====
| 7 August 2025 First leg | Olimpija Ljubljana (Slovenia) | 0–0 | (Albania) Egnatia | Ljubljana |
| 20:00 UTC+2 | | Report | | Stadium: Stožice Stadium; Attendance: 3,596; Referee: John Beaton (Scotland) |

| 14 August 2025 Second leg | Egnatia (Albania) | 2–4 (a.e.t.) (2–4 agg.) | (Slovenia) Olimpija Ljubljana | Rrogozhinë, Albania |
| 21:00 UTC+2 | Lushkja 6', 86' | Report | Jelenković 32'; Marin 79'; Durdov 99'; Blanco 107' | Stadium: Egnatia Arena; Attendance: 4,500; Referee: Urs Schnyder (Switzerland)) |

==== Play-off round ====
| 21 August 2025 First leg | Olimpija Ljubljana (Slovenia) | 1–4 | (Armenia) Noah | Ljubljana |
| 20:00 UTC+2 | Durdov 56' | Report | Jakoliš 36'; Oulad Omar 39', 52' (pen.), 64' | Stadium: Stožice Stadium; Attendance: 3,937; Referee: Allard Lindhout (Netherlands) |

| 28 August 2025 Second leg | Noah (Armenia) | 3–2 (7–3 agg.) | (Slovenia) Olimpija Ljubljana | Abovyan, Armenia |
| 18:00 UTC+4 | Ferreira 17'; Aiás 20'; Harutyunyan 77' | Report | Marin 56' (pen.); Durdov 76' | Stadium: Abovyan City Stadium; Attendance: 2,900; Referee: Andris Treimanis (Latvia) |
