= 2017–18 NK Olimpija Ljubljana season =

Olimpija Ljubljana
2017–18 season
- President: Milan Mandarić
- Head Coach: Igor Bišćan
- Stadium: Stožice Stadium
- Slovenian League: 1st
- Slovenian Cup: Winners
- Europa League: 1st qualifying round
- Top goalscorer: Ricardo Alves (10)
- Highest home attendance: 13,000 (vs Maribor)
Home colours	Away colours	Third colours

Olimpija Ljubljana are a Slovenian football club which are based in Ljubljana. During the 2017-18 campaign they will compete in the following competitions:Slovenian PrvaLiga, Slovenian Football Cup, UEFA Europa League.

== Competitions ==
=== PrvaLiga ===
==== League table ====
Pos	Team	Pld	W	D	L	GF	GA	GD	Pts	Qualification or relegation
1	Olimpija Ljubljana (C)	36	23	11	2	61	17	+44	80 (Note: Olimpija Ljubljana were ahead of Maribor on head-to-head away goals scored: Olimpija 3 goals, Maribor 1 goal.)	Qualification for the Champions League first qualifying round
2	Maribor	36	24	8	4	76	28	+48	80	Qualification for the Europa League first qualifying round (Note: Olimpija Ljubljana qualified for the Europa League first qualifying round by winning the 2017–18 Slovenian Football Cup. However, since they already qualified for European competition based on their league position, the spot awarded to them as the cup winners was passed to the fourth-placed team.)
3	Domžale	36	22	7	7	79	31	+48	73	Qualification for the Europa League first qualifying round
4	Rudar Velenje	36	15	5	16	50	49	+1	50 (Note: Rudar Velenje were ahead of Celje on head-to-head points: Rudar 9 pts, Celje 3 pts.)	Qualification for the Europa League first qualifying round
5	Celje	36	14	8	14	56	51	+5	50	

Source: PrvaLiga (in Slovene), Soccerway, UEFA.com
Rules for classification: 1) Points; 2) Head-to-head points; 3) Head-to-head goal difference; 4) Head-to-head away goals scored; 5) Goal difference; 6) Goals scored; 7) Away goals scored; 8) Fair play ranking; 9) Draw.
(C) Champions

==== Results summary ====
Overall								Home						Away					
Pld	W	D	L	GF	GA	GD	Pts	W	D	L	GF	GA	GD	W	D	L	GF	GA	GD
36	23	11	2	61	17	+44	80	13	5	0	36	6	+30	10	6	2	25	11	+14

Last updated: 27 May 2018.

==== Results by matchday ====
Matchday	1	2	3	4	5	6	7	8	9	10	11	12	13	14	15	16	17	18	19	20	21	22	23	24	25	26	27	28	29	30	31	32	33	34	35	36
Ground	H	A	H	A	H	A	H	A	H	A	H	A	H	A	H	A	H	A	H	A	H	A	H	A	H	A	H	A	H	A	H	A	H	A	H	A
Result	W	W	W	D	W	W	D	W	W	D	W	W	W	D	W	L	W	L	W	W	W	W	W	W	D	W	D	D	D	W	W	D	D	W	W	D
Position	1	1	1	1	1	1	1	1	1	1	1	1	1	1	1	2	1	2	2	2	1	1	1	1	1	1	1	1	1	1	1	1	2	1	1	1

Updated to match(es) played on 27 May 2018. Source:
A = Away; H = Home; W = Win; D = Draw; L = Loss

==== Matches ====
16 July 2017 1	Olimpija Ljubljana	3–1	Celje	Ljubljana
20:20	Brkić 42' (yellow card) 59'; Issah 49'; Ricardo Alves 51'; Kapun (yellow card) 86'	Report	Jucie Lupeta (yellow card) 12'; Vidmajer (yellow card) 16'; Nikola Gatarić (yellow card) 30'; Rok Jazbec (yellow card) 37'; Dangubić 77'	Stadium: Stožice Stadium; Attendance: 1,400; Referee: (Slovenia) Matej Jug

23 July 2017 2	Gorica	0–2	Olimpija Ljubljana	Nova Gorica
20:20	Osuji (yellow card) 22'; Andrija Filipović (yellow card) 45'	Report	Issah 40'; Eleke 75'	Stadium: Nova Gorica Sports Park; Attendance: 1,100; Referee: (Slovenia) Dragoslav Perić

=== Cup ===
==== Round of 16 ====
19 September 2017 2	Radomlje	1–6	Olimpija Ljubljana	Domžale
20:00 CEST	Hajrić 85'	Report	Boateng 24'; Benko 26', 32', 61'; Miškić 75'; Savić 89'	Stadium: Domžale Sports Park; Attendance: 200; Referee: Andrej Žnidaršič

==== Quarter-finals ====
11 November 2017 First leg	Olimpija Ljubljana	3–0	Maribor	Ljubljana
17:15 CET	Issah 11'; Kapun 35', 90+3'	Report		Stadium: Stožice Stadium; Attendance: 7,000; Referee: Roberto Ponis

29 November 2017 Second leg	Maribor	1–1 (1–4 agg.)	Olimpija Ljubljana	Maribor
20:15 CET	Bajde 15'	Report	Kronaveter 44'	Stadium: Ljudski vrt Attendance: 3,000; Referee: Dragoslav Perić

==== Semi-finals ====
4 April 2018 First leg	Olimpija Ljubljana	2–1	Celje	Ljubljana
18:00 CEST	Čanađija 50'; Issah 90'	Report	Vizinger 2'	Stadium: Stožice Stadium; Attendance: 1,000; Referee: Slavko Vinčić

11 April 2018 Second leg	Celje	0–1 (1–3 agg.)	Olimpija Ljubljana	Celje
17:15 CEST		Report	Zarifović 42'	Stadium: Stadion Z'dežele; Attendance: 2,370; Referee: Nejc Kajtazović

==== Final ====
30 May 2018 Final	Aluminij	1–6	Olimpija Ljubljana	Ljubljana
20:15 CEST	Tahiraj 49'	Report	Benko 18', 58'; Kronaveter 36'; Alves 65'; Brkić 80'; Issah 85'	Stadium: Stožice Stadium; Attendance: 8,804; Referee: Andrej Žnidaršič

=== Europa League ===
==== First qualifying round ====
29 June 2017 First leg	(Finland) VPS	1–0	(Slovenia) Olimpija Ljubljana	Vaasa
18:00	Vahtera 12'	Report	Miškić (yellow card) 37'; Zarifović (yellow card) 49'; Gajič (yellow card) 78'	Stadium: Elisa Stadion; Attendance: 3,989; Referee: (Czech Republic) Petr Ardeleánu

6 July 2017 Second leg	(Slovenia) Olimpija Ljubljana	0–1 (0–2 agg.)	(Finland) VPS	Ljubljana
20:15	Bajrić (yellow card) 65'; Issah (yellow card) 68'; Miškić (yellow card) 80'	Report	Lähde (yellow card) 39'; Strandvall 66'; Meerits (yellow card) 86'	Stadium: Stožice Stadium; Attendance: 4,700; Referee: (Greece) Georgios Kominis
