= Jošt Urbančič =

Slovenian footballer

Personal information
- Date of birth: 12 April 2001 (age 25)
- Place of birth: Ljubljana, Slovenia
- Height: 1.75 m (5 ft 9 in)
- Position: Left-back

Team information
- Current team: Olimpija Ljubljana
- Number: 3

Youth career
- ŠD Dren Drenov Grič
- 2011–2017: Olimpija Ljubljana
- 2017–2020: Domžale

Senior career*
Years	Team	Apps	(Gls)
2019–2022	Domžale	14	(0)
2021–2022	→ Gorica (loan)	23	(1)
2022	Gorica	19	(0)
2023–2025	Viking	34	(1)
2025–	Olimpija Ljubljana	12	(1)

International career^{‡}
2016	Slovenia U15	7	(1)
2016–2017	Slovenia U16	7	(0)
2017–2018	Slovenia U17	22	(3)
2018–2019	Slovenia U18	6	(0)
2018–2020	Slovenia U19	22	(3)
2026–	Slovenia	1	(0)
- * Club domestic league appearances and goals as of 13:11, 24 December 2025 (UTC) ‡ National team caps and goals as of 12:59, 29 March 2026 (UTC)

Jošt Urbančič (born 12 April 2001) is a Slovenian professional footballer who plays as a left-back for Slovenian PrvaLiga club Olimpija Ljubljana and the Slovenia national team.

== Career ==
Urbančič is a youth product of Olimpija Ljubljana. He made his Slovenian PrvaLiga debut for Domžale on 22 May 2019 against Triglav Kranj. On 29 December 2022, he signed a four-year contract with Norwegian Eliteserien club Viking.

Urbančič joined the club in the summer of 2017 and played for the U17 and U19 teams until making his senior debut in an away match against NK Triglav Kranj on 22 May 2019. On 8 January 2020, Urbančič signed a three-year contract.

== Career statistics ==
As of match played 7 December 2025

Appearances and goals by club, season and competition
Club	Season	League			National cup (Note: Includes Slovenian Cup, Norwegian Cup)		Continental		Total	
Club	Season	Division	Apps	Goals	Apps	Goals	Apps	Goals	Apps	Goals
Domžale	2018–19	Slovenian PrvaLiga	1	0	0	0	—		1	0
Domžale	2019–20	Slovenian PrvaLiga	4	0	1	0	—		5	0
Domžale	2020–21	Slovenian PrvaLiga	9	0	2	0	—		11	0
Domžale	Total		14	0	3	0	—		17	0
Gorica (loan)	2021–22	Slovenian Second League	23	1	1	0	—		24	1
Gorica	2022–23	Slovenian PrvaLiga	19	0	0	0	—		19	0
Gorica	Total		42	1	1	0	—		43	1
Viking	2023	Eliteserien	3	0	1	0	—		4	0
Viking	2024	Eliteserien	24	0	2	0	—		26	0
Viking	2025	Eliteserien	7	1	2	0	—		9	1
Viking	Total		34	1	5	0	—		39	1
Olimpija Ljubljana	2025–26	Slovenian PrvaLiga	12	1	1	0	5 (Note: One appearance in UEFA Champions League, four appearances in UEFA Conference League)	0	18	1
Career total			102	3	10	0	5	0	117	3
