= Ahmet Muhamedbegović =

Austrian footballer (born 1998)

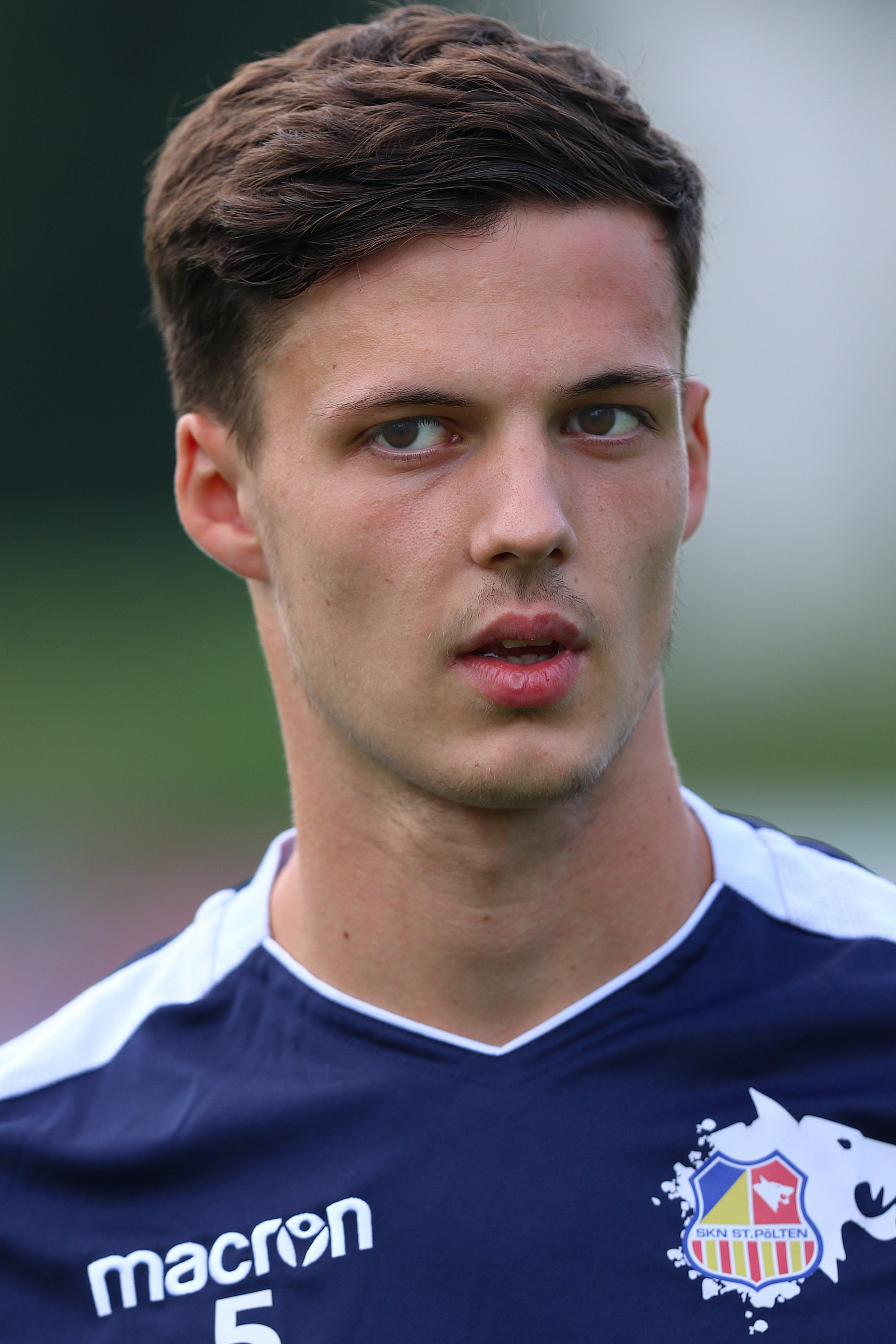
- Muhamedbegović with SKN St. Pölten in 2018

Personal information
- Date of birth: 30 October 1998 (age 28)
- Place of birth: Untersiebenbrunn, Austria
- Height: 1.86 m (6 ft 1 in)
- Position: Centre-back

Team information
- Current team: Dynamo Dresden
- Number: 17

Youth career
- 2004–2005: SC Untersiebenbrunn
- 2005–2011: FC Untersiebenbrunn
- 2011–2016: AKA St. Pölten

Senior career*
Years	Team	Apps	(Gls)
2016–2021	SKN St. Pölten II	34	(0)
2016–2021	SKN St. Pölten	64	(3)
2018–2019	→ Amstetten (loan)	22	(0)
2021–2023	Dunajská Streda	43	(0)
2023–2026	Olimpija Ljubljana	80	(2)
2026–	Dynamo Dresden	0	(0)
- * Club domestic league appearances and goals as of 2 June 2026

Ahmet Muhamedbegović (born 30 October 1998) is an Austrian professional footballer who plays as a centre-back for German 2. Bundesliga club Dynamo Dresden.

== Club career ==
=== SKN St. Pölten ===
Muhamedbegović made his Austrian Football Bundesliga debut for SKN St. Pölten on 17 December 2016 in a game against Admira Wacker Mödling.

In July 2018, he moved to 2. Liga club SKU Amstetten on a one-year cooperation deal. During his stint there, he made 22 league appearances. For the 2019–20 season, he returned to St. Pölten. Through five seasons, Muhamedbegović made 64 appearances in the Austrian Bundesliga for the Lower Austrians, in which he scored three goals. At the end of the 2020–21 season, St. Pölten suffered relegation from the Bundesliga, after which Muhamedbegović left the club after five years.

=== Dunajská Streda ===
On 20 July 2021, Muhamedbegović signed a two-year contract with Slovak Super Liga club DAC Dunajská Streda. He made his competitive debut for the club as a starter on 25 July in a 4–1 away loss to Zemplín Michalovce.

Muhamedbegović made his first appearance in a European competition on 14 July 2022, starting in a 3–0 away victory against Northern Irish side Cliftonville in the UEFA Europa Conference League first qualifying round. He left DAC at the end of the 2022–23 season, having made 51 official appearances for the club in which he failed to score.

=== Olimpija Ljubljana ===
On 30 May 2023, it was announced that Muhamedbegović had signed a three-year contract with Slovenian PrvaLiga club Olimpija Ljubljana. He made his competitive debut for the club on 11 July, starting in a 2–1 home win over Latvian club Valmiera in the UEFA Champions League qualifiers. His first goal for the club came in the return leg, helping the "Dragons" to another 2–1 victory against Valmiera, and securing their advancement to the second qualifying round.

=== Dynamo Dresden ===
On 23 June 2026, Muhamedbegović signed with Dynamo Dresden in Germany.

== Personal life ==
Born in Austria, Muhamedbegović is of Bosnian descent.
