= Vančo Trajanov =

Macedonian footballer

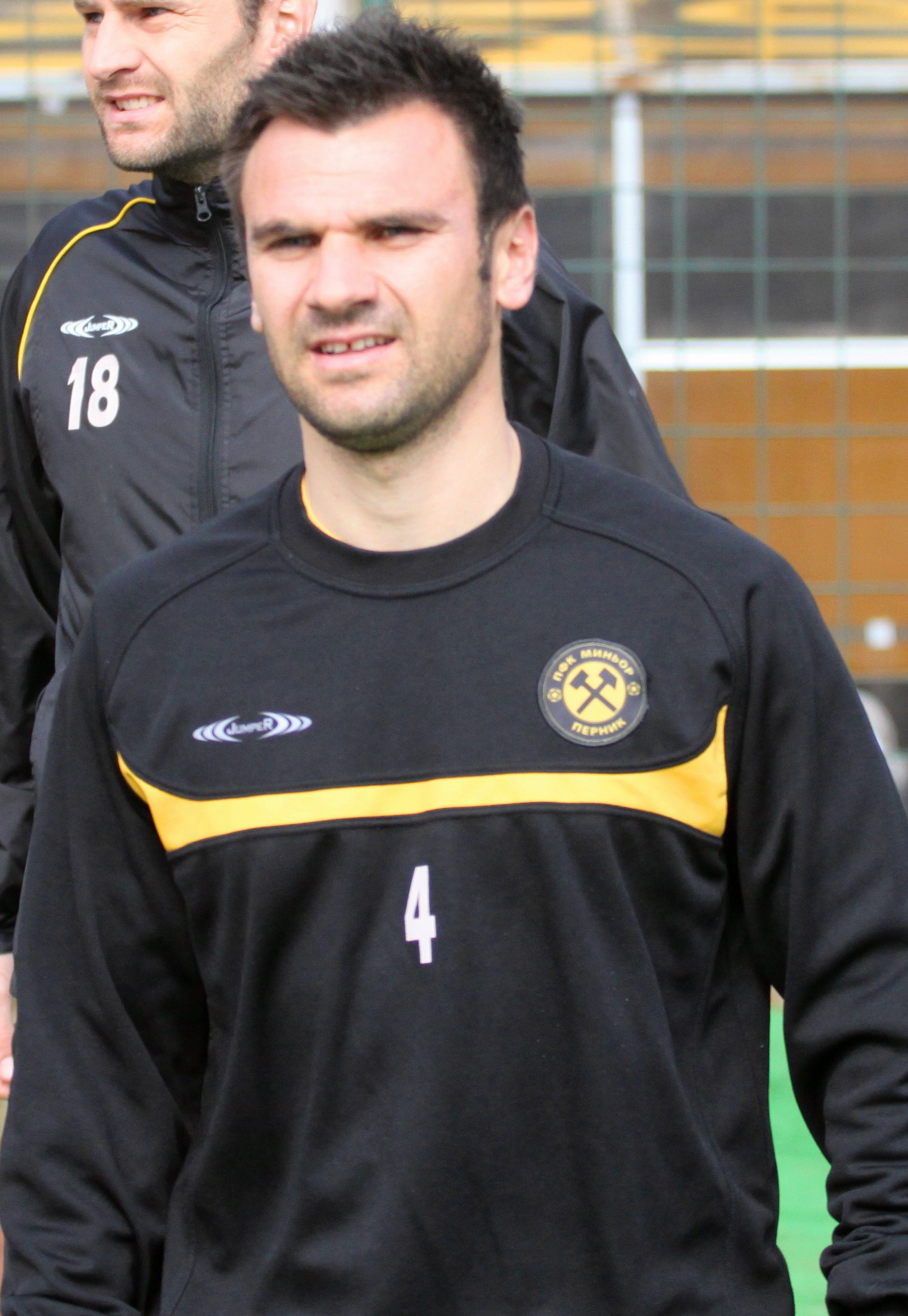
- Trajanov in 2011

Personal information
- Date of birth: 9 August 1978 (age 48)
- Place of birth: Delčevo, SR Macedonia, SFR Yugoslavia
- Height: 1.70 m (5 ft 7 in)
- Position: Defensive midfielder

Youth career
- Bregalnica Delčevo

Senior career*
Years	Team	Apps	(Gls)
1997–1999	Pelister	1	(0)
1999–2000	Napredok	15	(1)
2000–2001	Velbazhd Kyustendil	25	(3)
2001–2004	Lokomotiv Plovdiv	72	(4)
2004–2006	Arminia Bielefeld	1	(0)
2006–2009	Chernomorets Burgas	59	(1)
2009–2010	Maccabi Petah Tikva	21	(0)
2010–2012	Minyor Pernik	50	(2)
2013–2014	Chernomorets Burgas	37	(1)
2014–2018	Lokomotiv Plovdiv	95	(1)
2018–2019	Oborishte	6	(0)
Total		382	(13)

International career
2001–2009	Macedonia	36	(2)
- * Club domestic league appearances and goals

Vančo Trajanov (Macedonian: Ванчо Трајанов; born 9 August 1978) is a Macedonian former professional footballer who played as a defensive midfielder.

He was the first – and, to date, only – non-Bulgarian to have made more than 300 Bulgarian First League appearances (making him the highest-appearing non-Bulgarian in the First League's history). At international level, Trajanov played for the Macedonian national team 35 times between 2001 and 2009.

== Club career ==
Trajanov began his career in FK Bregalnica Delčevo.

In 2002, Trajanov was signed by fellow Bulgarian A Group club Lokomotiv Plovdiv with whom he would win the league in the season of 2003–04.

After success in Bulgaria, he moved to Germany to play for Arminia Bielefeld but failed to establish himself within the first team. Trajanov made his début for Arminia in a 4–2 win over 1. FC Köln II in the DFB-Pokal on 21 September 2004, coming on as a substitute. He made his Bundesliga début on 12 December 2004 as a second-half substitute in a 5–0 defeat to VfL Wolfsburg at Volkswagen Arena. This was to be his last appearance for Arminia.

In October 2006, Trajanov returned to Bulgaria to play for Chernomorets Burgas. For two-and-a-half seasons, he earned 59 appearances and scored one goal in a 1–0 home win against Marek Dupnitsa on 26 October 2007.

On 15 September 2010, Trajanov joined Minyor Pernik; fourth Bulgarian team in his career. At the start of the 2012–13 season he was selected as the new team captain. On 6 November 2012, Trajanov dissolved his contract due to financial reasons.

On 8 January 2013, Trajanov re-signed for Chernomorets Burgas on a free transfer. On 20 February 2017, he reached a historic milestone - Trajanov became the first foreign player to appear in 300 matches in the top Bulgarian division. Serbian Nebojša Jelenković (with 293 games) is in second place among foreign footballers.

On 14 June 2018, Trajanov announced his retirement as an active footballer, though he subsequently made a few appearances for Oborishte.

== International career ==
Trajanov made his senior debut for Macedonia in a June 2001 FIFA World Cup qualification match against Moldova in Skopje. On 16 October 2002, Trajanov scored goal during Macedonia's Euro 2004 qualifying match against England at St Mary's Stadium, which finished 2–2. In all Trajanov gained 36 caps, making his final appearance for Macedonia in the 4–0 loss against Netherlands on 1 April 2009.

== Career statistics ==
Vančo Trajanov: International Goals
#	Date	Venue	Opponent	Result	Competition
1.	5 September 2001	Baku, Azerbaijan	Azerbaijan	1–1	World Cup 2002 Qual.
2.	16 October 2002	Southampton, England	England	2–2	UEFA Euro 2004 Qual.

== Honours ==
Lokomotiv Plovdiv

- A Group: 2003–04
