= Nebojša Jelenković =

Serbian footballer

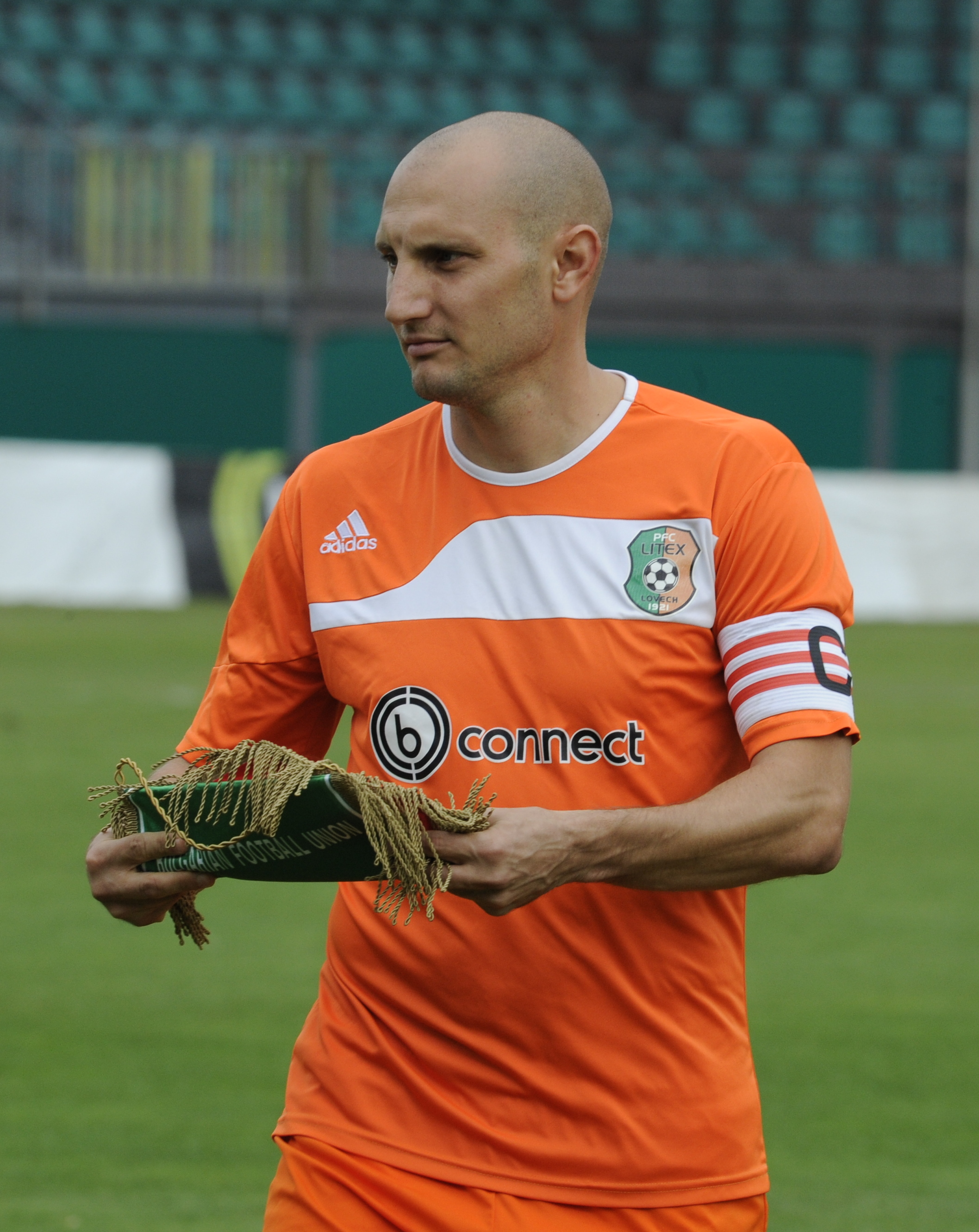

Personal information
- Full name: Nebojša Jelenković
- Date of birth: 26 May 1978 (age 48)
- Place of birth: Novi Sad, SFR Yugoslavia
- Height: 1.77 m (5 ft 10 in)
- Position: Defensive midfielder

Youth career
- Novi Sad

Senior career*
Years	Team	Apps	(Gls)
1997–1998	Novi Sad		
1998–1999	Obilić	15	(1)
1999–2008	Litex Lovech	214	(6)
2007	→ Kuban Krasnodar (loan)	2	(0)
2008–2009	Spartak Trnava	27	(1)
2009–2013	Litex Lovech	79	(1)
Total		337	(9)

International career
1999	FR Yugoslavia U21	3	(0)
- * Club domestic league appearances and goals

Nebojša Jelenković (Serbian Cyrillic: Небојша Јеленковић; born 26 May 1978) is a former Serbian professional footballer who played as a defensive midfielder.

He has played more than 290 domestic games with Litex Lovech and holds the record for the second most domestic games played by a foreigner in the Bulgarian A Group. He is also the first foreigner to become a captain of a Bulgarian team. In 2004, he obtained a Bulgarian passport. His son, Veljko is also a footballer.

== Career ==
=== In Serbia ===
Jelenković began his career at hometown club Novi Sad. In the summer of 1998, he signed with FR Yugoslavia champions Obilić.

=== Litex Lovech ===
In 1999 Jelenković moved to Litex Lovech. He made his first appearance for Litex in a Champions League qualification match against Widzew Łódź, on 28 July 1999. His league debut came on 8 August, in a 1–0 loss against Slavia Sofia on the opening day of the 1999–00 season. On 20 November 1999, Nebojša scored his first goals, scoring twice in a 3–1 away win over Velbazhd Kyustendil. He scored his final goal of the season in a 6–0 win at home over Volov Shumen on 1 April 2000.

On 29 August 2002, Jelenković scored his first-ever European goal in a 3–1 away win over Lithuanian Atlantas Klaipėda in their 2002–03 UEFA Cup qualifying round second leg tie. Three weeks later, he scored an own goal in a 1–0 home loss against Panathinaikos in the first round of the tournament.

In 2006, Jelenković was on the radar of then Bulgarian manager Hristo Stoichkov as a prospective candidate for the national team, but eventually did not meet the eligibility criteria because of having appeared in matches for the FR Yugoslavia U-21. In the same year CSKA Sofia attempted to secure the services of the Serbian midfielder.

On 30 August 2007, Kuban Krasnodar confirmed Jelenković has joined on loan for three months. He spent most of his time with Kuban on the bench, making only three Russian Premier League appearances. In December Jelenković returned to Litex and earned 12 appearances in the Bulgarian A PFG, scoring one goal to the end of the season.

=== Spartak Trnava ===
At the end of 2007–08 season his contract expired and Jelenković signed with Spartak Trnava on a one-year contract for the 2008–09 season. He earned 27 appearances playing in the Corgoň liga, scored one goal and the team finished in third place.

=== Return to Litex Lovech ===
On 12 June 2009, Jelenković again came back to Litex Lovech on a long-term contract. On 12 March 2011, he made his 250th appearance for Litex in the Bulgarian A PFG, in a 2–1 win over Pirin Blagoevgrad. Jelenković announced his retirement at the end of the 2012–13 season. He has featured on 293 occasions in the A PFG and is currently second on the all-time appearance list among foreign players in the top flight of Bulgarian football (after Macedonian Vančo Trajanov).

== Career statistics ==
Club	Season	League		Cup		Europe		Total	
Club	Season	Apps	Goals	Apps	Goals	Apps	Goals	Apps	Goals
Obilić	1998-99	15	1			0	0	15	1
Obilić	Total	15	1			0	0	15	1
Litex Lovech	1999–00	22	3	3	0	2	0	27	3
Litex Lovech	2000–01	21	0	5	0	–	–	26	0
Litex Lovech	2001–02	31	0	2	0	8	0	41	0
Litex Lovech	2002–03	23	0	6	0	4	1	33	1
Litex Lovech	2003–04	25	0	8	2	2	0	35	2
Litex Lovech	2004–05	28	0	2	0	4	0	34	0
Litex Lovech	2005–06	26	1	2	0	10	0	38	1
Litex Lovech	2006–07	22	1	5	1	6	1	33	3
Litex Lovech	2007–08	2	0	0	0	2	0	4	0
Litex Lovech	Total	200	5	33	3	38	2	271	10
Kuban Krasnodar	2007	2	0	0	0	–	–	2	0
Kuban Krasnodar	Total	2	0	0	0	0	0	2	0
Litex Lovech	2007–08	14	1	3	0	–	–	17	1
Litex Lovech	Total	14	1	3	0	0	0	17	1
Spartak Trnava	2008–09	27	1			2	0	29	1
Spartak Trnava	Total	27	1			2	0	29	1
Litex Lovech	2009–10	24	1	3	0	2	0	29	1
Litex Lovech	2010–11	22	0	3	0	6	1	31	1
Litex Lovech	2011–12	20	0	2	0	3	0	25	0
Litex Lovech	2012–13	13	0	2	0	–	–	15	0
Litex Lovech	Total	79	1	10	0	11	1	100	2
Career total		337	9	46	3	51	3	431	15

== Awards ==
Litex Lovech

  - Bulgarian A PFG 2009–10, 2010–11
    - Bulgarian Supercup 2010
  - 3 times Bulgarian Cup winner: 2001, 2004 and 2008
