= NK Olimpija Ljubljana =

Association football club in Ljubljana, Slovenia

Olimpija Ljubljana
- Full name: Športno društvo Nogometni klub Olimpija Ljubljana
- Nicknames: Zmaji (The Dragons); Zeleno-beli (The Green and Whites)
- Founded: 2 March 2005; 21 years ago (as NK Bežigrad)
- Ground: Stožice Stadium
- Capacity: 16,038
- President: Adam Delius
- Head coach: Jugoslav Trenchovski
- League: Slovenian PrvaLiga
- 2025–26: Slovenian PrvaLiga, 4th of 10
- Website: nkolimpija.si
Home colours	Away colours	Third colours

Nogometni klub Olimpija Ljubljana (Slovene pronunciation: [nɔɡɔˈméːtni ˈklúːp ɔˈlìːmpija ljubˈljàːna]; English: Olimpija Ljubljana Football Club), commonly referred to as Olimpija Ljubljana or simply Olimpija, is a Slovenian professional football club based in Ljubljana that competes in the Slovenian PrvaLiga, the top division of the Slovenian football league system. They have won four Slovenian PrvaLiga titles and four Slovenian Cups.

Founded on 2 March 2005 as NK Bežigrad, Olimpija began competing in the Slovenian fifth division during the 2005–06 season and managed to achieve promotion in four successive seasons, reaching the top division for the first time in 2009 after winning the 2008–09 Slovenian Second League. After seven years in the top division, Olimpija won their first major trophy when they were crowned champions in the 2015–16 season. They won three more league titles in 2017–18, 2022–23 and 2024–25; in 2017–18, Olimpija also won the national cup for the first time, completing their first double.

Initially, the club played at the Bežigrad Stadium and the ŽAK Stadium during the club's stay in the second division and during the first year in the top division. In 2010, they moved to the Stožice Stadium with a capacity of 16,038.

Olimpija's nicknames are the "Green and Whites" (Slovene: Zeleno-beli), referring to their primary colours, and "The Dragons" (Slovene: Zmaji), referring to the dragon which is a symbol of Ljubljana and is represented on the city's coat of arms and on the club's crest. Their main rivals are NK Maribor, with whom they contest the Eternal derby.

== History ==
=== Foundation ===
First club crest in 2005

Olimpija Ljubljana was founded on 2 March 2005 as NK Bežigrad, and was renamed NK Olimpija Bežigrad during their third season. The club was renamed again to ŠD NK Olimpija Ljubljana on 3 March 2008 after being granted the rights by the administrative unit of the City Municipality of Ljubljana. The club regard themselves as the continuation of the four-times Slovenian Champions Olimpija, who went bankrupt and were dissolved following the 2004–05 season. Legally, Olimpija Ljubljana is a distinct and separate club and treated as such by the Football Association of Slovenia.

Because of their association with the dissolved club, Olimpija Ljubljana were criticised on numerous occasions by several media outlets, which questioned the legitimacy of their actions and even the inclusion of the year 1911 on their crest. They are also continuously criticised by ND Ilirija 1911. In 2013, the Financial Administration of the Republic of Slovenia publicly disclosed the list of tax debtors in the country and among those was also NK Olimpija Ljubljana, with a tax debt between €100,000 and €300,000. The next day, Olimpija Ljubljana's officials made a public statement where they confirmed that the club in question (i.e. dissolved Olimpija) is a different legal entity and is not, by any means, connected with Olimpija Ljubljana which does not have any financial obligations to the state or any third parties.

=== Early years (2005–2009) ===
Assisted by semi-retired club legends of the old Olimpija and other notable Slovenian players, the club started to compete in the lowest tier of Slovenian football and won the fifth division in their first year. In the next two seasons, Bežigrad was promoted to the Slovenian Second League, by winning both fourth and third divisions in consecutive seasons. During their season in the fourth division the club changed its name for the first time and became known as Olimpija Bežigrad. This happened despite the claims of Joc Pečečnik, one of the wealthiest man in Slovenia and, at the time, owner of NK Interblock, that he is in fact the sole owner of the Olimpija name and brand. During the 2008–09 season, the club changed their name once again, this time to Olimpija Ljubljana. In the same season, the club won the second division title and earned a promotion to the Slovenian top division. Throughout the path to the top division, Olimpija was supported by Green Dragons, the fan group of the dissolved Olimpija. The success of the club, who earned a promotion from the fifth division to top division in only four seasons, was somewhat dented by a conflict between several players, coaching staff, club leadership and sponsors, which eventually led to a player-led boycott in the final round of the 2008–09 second division season. Due to this event, the club began their first season in Slovenian top flight (2009–10) with a two points deduction. In addition, several notable players, including Miran Pavlin and Amir Karić, left the club.

=== Promotion to Slovenian top division (2009–2015) ===
For their first ever 1. SNL campaign, several players were signed to replace the recent departures, along with a new coach, Branko Oblak. The club had a poor start, as the team, mainly composed of young players and a small number of veterans, only managed one win in the opening four matches. After their defeat against Maribor on 8 August 2009, the club announced that Oblak had agreed to terminate his contract, with assistant manager Safet Hadžić taking his place as caretaker. The club's fortunes soon turned result-wise and Robert Pevnik was hired to take over as manager. The club finished the season in fourth place.

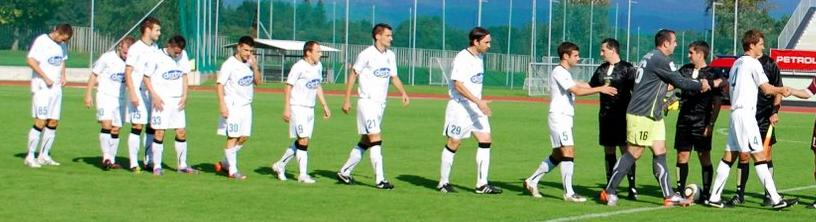
Olimpija in 2010

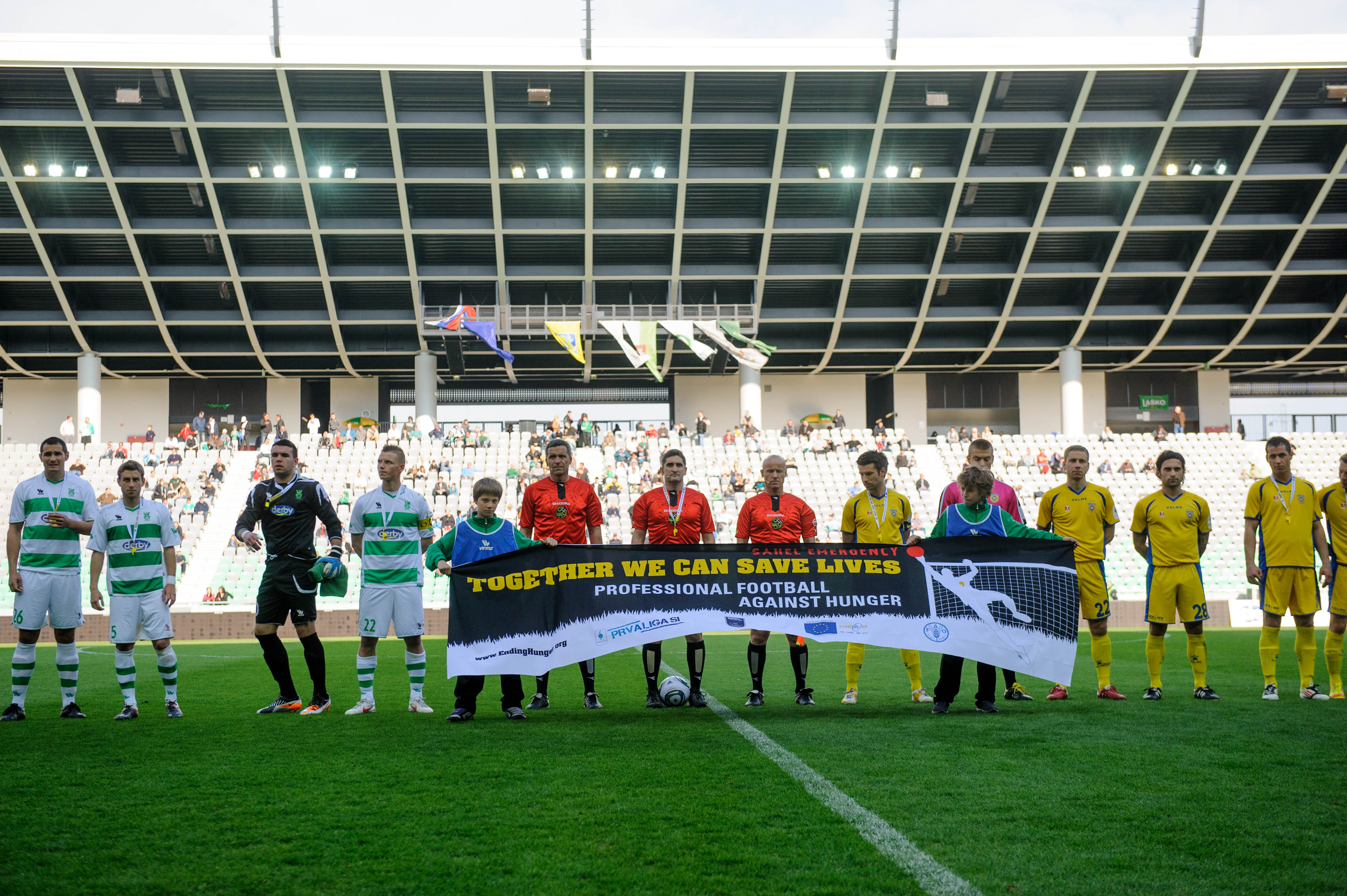
Match between Olimpija and Domžale in the 2011–12 Slovenian PrvaLiga

In the run up to the 2010–11 season, principal sponsor Izet Rastoder was elected president and Hadžić took over as manager. The season started poorly, with a 5–0 aggregate defeat against Široki Brijeg in the UEFA Europa League qualifying round. This game was later alleged by German television station ARD to have been fixed. It was later revealed that UEFA officially investigated the match and that three players of Olimpija were under investigation. After another poor start which saw the club only manage two points in five matches, manager Hadžić and director of football Simon Sešlar both left in August 2010. Dušan Kosič then took over as manager with Aleš Čeh as his assistant. On 26 January 2011, former Slovenian international Milenko Ačimovič became the director of football. After a poor start into the season, the new director of football brought a couple of players with international experiences, among which was also a midfielder Dare Vršič. During the second phase of the Slovenian championship the team started to show their potential and eventually finished their second 1. SNL season in fourth place, securing a place in the 2011–12 UEFA Europa League qualifications. With the 3–0 home victory against Široki Brijeg on 7 July 2011, Olimpija achieved its first victory in UEFA competitions. In addition, it was the first international club match played at the Stožice Stadium, opened in August 2010. During the 2011–12 Slovenian PrvaLiga season, the club finished as a runner-up behind Maribor.

=== National champions (2015 to present) ===
In June 2015, Milan Mandarić, a Serbian-American business tycoon, took over the club. In his first season, the club won the Slovenian League title for the first time. During the 2017–18 season, Olimpija won the double after winning the league title over Maribor with the same number of points, but with a better head-to-head record, and winning the national cup after defeating Aluminij 6–1 in the final.

Olimpija won two more cup titles in 2018–19 and 2020–21, before winning their third league championship in 2022–23. They confirmed the title with five rounds to go, after beating rivals Maribor 2–0 in the 31st round. In the same season, Olimpija also won their fourth cup title after defeating Maribor 2–1 in the 2023 Slovenian Cup final, thus achieving their second double in five years.

In the 2023–24 season, Olimpija reached the group stage of a European competition for the first time, competing in the UEFA Europa Conference League, and in 2024–25, they won their fourth league title. The 2025–26 season was marked by several head coach changes, and for the first time in many years the club failed to qualify for European competition after finishing fourth in the league.

=== Name changes ===
- NK Bežigrad (2005–2007)
- NK Olimpija Bežigrad (2007–2008)
- NK Olimpija Ljubljana (2008–present)

== Club colours and kits ==
Olimpija's original kit

Since the club's foundation, Olimpija has been playing in the combination of green and white, which were also the main colours of the dissolved Olimpija. Today, the club plays in green kits at home and in white kits away. The third kit is usually black or grey. Since June 2022, the kit manufacturer is Puma.

== Stadium ==
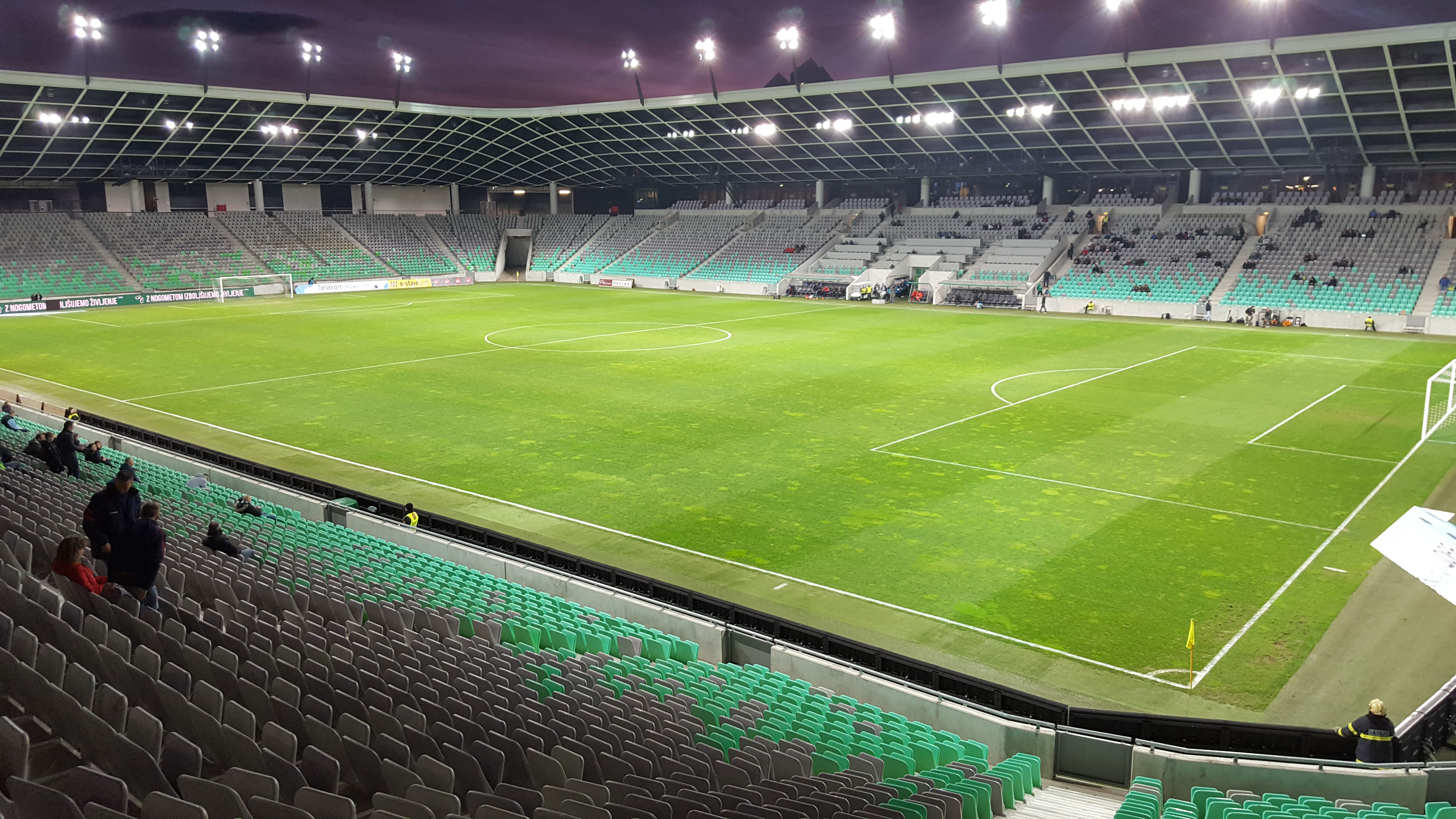
Stožice Stadium

Stožice Stadium is a football stadium located in Ljubljana with a capacity of 16,038 covered seats. It was designed by the Sadar + Vuga architecture bureau and is the biggest Slovenian football stadium. It opened in August 2010 and lies in the Bežigrad district, north of the city centre. Together with an indoor arena, it is a part of the Stožice Sports Park. The stadium also has 558 VIP seats and 97 spots for persons with disabilities. Olimpija played its first match at the new stadium on 22 August 2010, in front of 7,000 spectators in a league match against Koper. The record home attendance was set in 2014, when 15,972 spectators gathered to watch Olimpija play against English Premier League side Chelsea in a friendly match. The stadium is also used as the main venue for home matches of the Slovenia national football team, as well as for many cultural events such as music concerts.

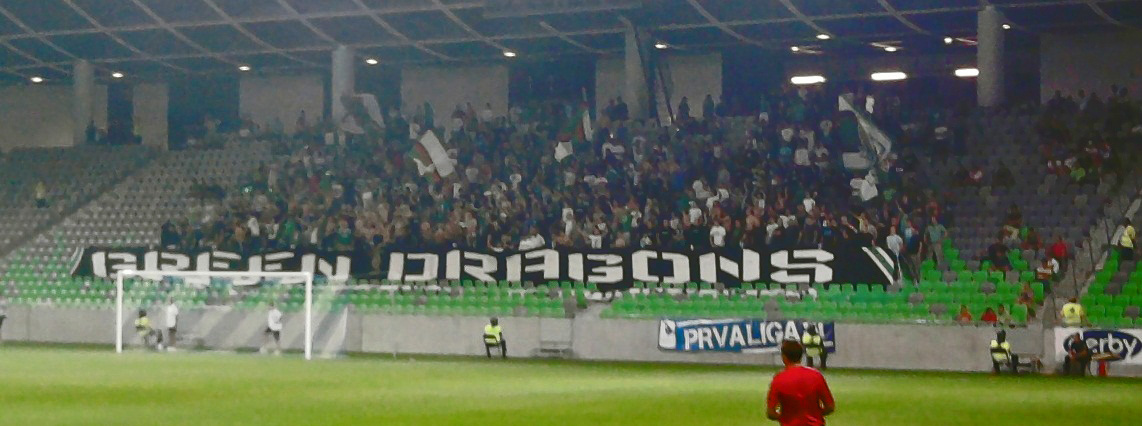
Green Dragons in 2010

== Supporters ==
Olimpija's main supporters are called Green Dragons, one of the two largest ultras groups in the country, who also supported the old Olimpija until the club's dissolution in 2005 and went over to the new club in the same year, as they regard it as a successor of the original club. They mostly wear green and white symbols and clothing, which are the club's colours.

== Rivalry ==
Olimpija's biggest rivalry is with NK Maribor, against whom they contest the Eternal derby (Slovene: Večni derbi). The rivalry is a continuation of the original Eternal derby, contested by Maribor and the defunct Olimpija, which folded and was dissolved in 2005. The rivalry dates back to the early 1960s and the time of Yugoslavia, when the first match between the two clubs was played. The rivalry reached its peak in the last round of the 2000–01 season, when Olimpija met Maribor at their home stadium, Bežigrad. Olimpija needed a win for the title, while a draw was enough for Maribor. The match ended in a 1–1 draw, and Maribor won its fifth consecutive title.

The additional intensity of the rivalry is the fact that both Maribor and Olimpija have always had the support of the ultras groups called Viole Maribor, supporting Maribor, and Green Dragons, who support Olimpija. The two groups are the largest in the country, and it is not uncommon for matches between the two clubs to sometimes be interrupted due to violent clashes between the fans or with the police.

Since most of the fans of the defunct Olimpija support the new Olimpija, many see the matches between Maribor and the new club as a continuation of the rivalry and call it by the same name. The first match between Maribor and the new Olimpija took place on 24 October 2007 in a Slovenian Cup quarter-final match, which Maribor won 3–1. At the time, Olimpija still competed under the name Olimpija Bežigrad.

== Squad ==
=== Current squad ===
As of 9 November 2026

Note: Flags indicate national team as defined under FIFA eligibility rules; some limited exceptions apply. Players may hold more than one non-FIFA nationality.

No.	Pos.	Nation	Player
3	DF	SLO	Jošt Urbančič
4	DF	BUL	Veljko Jelenković
6	MF	ESP	Luis Perea
8	MF	POR	Bruno Lourenço
9	FW	SLO	Dino Kojić
10	FW	MKD	Dimitar Mitrovski
11	FW	CAN	Federico Rose
14	DF	SLO	Kristjan Bendra
15	DF	SLO	Marko Ristić
17	FW	ALB	Marvin Çuni (on loan from Rubin Kazan)
18	FW	SLO	Marko Brest
19	FW	ALB	Indrit Tuci
20	FW	SRB	Nemanja Motika
22	GK	SLO	Denis Pintol

No.	Pos.	Nation	Player
23	DF	GEO	Davit Kobouri
24	FW	EST	Alex Tamm
26	GK	SLO	Matevž Vidovšek
28	DF	POR	Diogo Almeida
30	DF	SLO	Jan Gorenc
33	DF	ECU	Jordi Govea
34	MF	ARG	Agustín Doffo
54	MF	SLO	Jan Jurgec
55	DF	SLO	Matej Henjak
71	MF	SLO	Tien Goga
77	FW	BRA	Xande
79	FW	SLE	Yayah Kallon
90	MF	CRO	Robert Mišković
99	FW	CRO	Antonio Marin

=== Retired numbers ===
No. / Pos. / Nation / Player; 5 / DF / SLO / Marko Elsner	No. / Pos. / Nation / Player; 7 / FW / SLO / Danilo Popivoda

== Honours ==
=== League ===
- Slovenian First League
  - Winners: 2015–16, 2017–18, 2022–23, 2024–25
  - Runners-up: 2011–12, 2012–13, 2018–19
- Slovenian Second League
  - Winners: 2008–09
- Slovenian Third League
  - Winners: 2007–08 (west)
- Ljubljana Regional League (fourth tier)
  - Winners: 2006–07
- Slovenian Fifth Division
  - Winners: 2005–06

=== Cup ===
- Slovenian Cup
  - Winners: 2017–18, 2018–19, 2020–21, 2022–23
  - Runners-up: 2016–17
- Slovenian Supercup
  - Runners-up: 2012, 2013
- MNZ Ljubljana Cup
  - Runners-up: 2006–07, 2008–09

== Season-by-season record ==
=== Key ===
League

- P = Matches played
- W = Matches won
- D = Matches drawn
- L = Matches lost
- F = Goals for
- A = Goals against
- Pts = Points won
- Pos = Final position

Competitions

- Div 1 = Slovenian PrvaLiga
- Div 2 = Slovenian Second League
- Div 3 = Slovenian Third League (West)
- Div 4 = Ljubljana Regional League
- Div 5 = MNZ Ljubljana League
- Cup = Slovenian Cup
- Supercup = Slovenian Supercup

Cup / Europe

- N/A = Not held
- — = Did not compete
- QR = Qualifying round
- PO = Play-off round
- GS = Group stage
- KPP = Knockout phase play-offs
- R16 = Round of 16
- QF = Quarter-final
- SF = Semi-final
- F = Final/Runner-up
- W = Competition won

Champions †	Runners-up ‡	Promoted ↑

Season	Division	P	W	D	L	F	A	Pts	Pos	Cup	Supercup	Competition	Result	Name	Goals
Season	League									Cup	Supercup	Other		Top scorer	
2005–06	Div 5 ↑	17	16	1	0	82	9	49	1st †	—	N/A	—	—	Zoran Ubavič	17
2006–07	Div 4 ↑	22	19	3	0	91	13	60	1st †	—	N/A	—	—	Miran Pavlin; Zoran Ubavič	24
2007–08	Div 3 ↑	24	20	3	1	79	13	63	1st †	QF	—	—	—	Davor Bubanja	16
2008–09	Div 2 ↑	26	17	5	4	69	25	56	1st †	R16	—	—	—	Miran Pavlin	15
2009–10	Div 1	36	16	7	13	51	33	53^{[A]}	4th	R16	—	—	—	Sebastjan Cimirotič	9
2010–11	Div 1	36	15	10	11	59	43	55	4th	QF	—	UEFA Europa League	1QR	Adnan Bešić; Davor Škerjanc	8
2011–12	Div 1	36	19	8	9	60	38	65	2nd ‡	R16	—	UEFA Europa League	3QR	Dare Vršič	27
2012–13	Div 1	36	21	7	8	73	35	70	2nd ‡	QF	F ‡	UEFA Europa League	2QR	Nikola Nikezić	16
2013–14	Div 1	36	12	6	18	38	56	42	7th	SF	F ‡	UEFA Europa League	2QR	Nik Omladič	10
2014–15	Div 1	36	17	10	9	55	32	61	4th	QF	—	—	—	Andraž Šporar	13
2015–16	Div 1	36	22	8	6	75	25	74	1st †	QF	—	—	—	Rok Kronaveter; Andraž Šporar	17
2016–17	Div 1	36	17	9	10	49	35	60	3rd	F ‡	N/A	UEFA Champions League	2QR	Leon Benko	14
2017–18	Div 1	36	23	11	2	61	17	80	1st †	W †	N/A	UEFA Europa League	1QR	Abass Issah	12
2018–19	Div 1	36	20	9	7	73	47	69	2nd ‡	W †	N/A	UEFA Champions League; UEFA Europa League	1QR; PO	Rok Kronaveter	21
2019–20	Div 1	36	20	7	9	73	44	67	3rd	R16	N/A	UEFA Europa League	2QR	Ante Vukušić	27
2020–21	Div 1	36	16	11	9	45	35	59	3rd	W †	N/A	UEFA Europa League	2QR	Andrés Vombergar	14
2021–22	Div 1	36	18	8	10	53	38	62	3rd	QF	N/A	UEFA Europa Conference League	3QR	Mustafa Nukić	13
2022–23	Div 1	36	23	4	9	60	39	73	1st †	W †	N/A	UEFA Europa Conference League	2QR	Mario Kvesić	13
2023–24	Div 1	36	18	10	8	69	44	64	3rd	R16	N/A	UEFA Champions League; UEFA Europa League; UEFA Europa Conference League	3QR; PO; GS	Rui Pedro	12
2024–25	Div 1	36	21	11	4	63	20	74	1st †	SF	N/A	UEFA Conference League	KPP	Raul Florucz	20
2025–26	Div 1	34	16	7	11	50	40	55	4th	QF	N/A	UEFA Champions League; UEFA Conference League	1QR; PO	Antonio Marin	11

== European record ==
=== Record by competition ===
UEFA competitions
Competition	Pld	W	D	L	GF	GA	Last season played
UEFA Champions League	12	4	3	5	14	18	2025–26
UEFA Europa League	30	10	8	12	43	35	2023–24
UEFA Conference League	34	15	6	13	44	39	2025–26
Total	76	29	17	30	101	92	—N/a

=== Matches ===
All results (home and away) list Olimpija's goal tally first.

Season	Competition	Round	Club	Home	Away	Aggregate
2010–11	UEFA Europa League	First qualifying round	(Bosnia and Herzegovina) Široki Brijeg	0–2	0–3	0–5
2011–12	UEFA Europa League	First qualifying round	(Bosnia and Herzegovina) Široki Brijeg	3–0	0–0	3–0
2011–12	UEFA Europa League	Second qualifying round	(Republic of Ireland) Bohemians	2–0	1–1	3–1
2011–12	UEFA Europa League	Third qualifying round	Austria Wien	1–1	2–3	3–4
2012–13	UEFA Europa League	First qualifying round	(Luxembourg) Jeunesse Esch	3–0	3–0	6–0
2012–13	UEFA Europa League	Second qualifying round	(Norway) Tromsø	0–0	0–1 (Note: The tie went to extra time.)	0–1
2013–14	UEFA Europa League	Second qualifying round	(Slovakia) Žilina	3–1	0–2	3–3 (Note: Lost on the away goals rule.)
2016–17	UEFA Champions League	Second qualifying round	(Slovakia) Trenčín	3–4	3–2	6–6
2017–18	UEFA Europa League	First qualifying round	(Finland) VPS	0–1	0–1	0–2
2018–19	UEFA Champions League	First qualifying round	(Azerbaijan) Qarabağ	0–1	0–0	0–1
2018–19	UEFA Europa League	Second qualifying round	(Northern Ireland) Crusaders	5–1	1–1	6–2
2018–19	UEFA Europa League	Third qualifying round	(Finland) HJK	3–0	4–1	7–1
2018–19	UEFA Europa League	Play-off round	(Slovakia) Spartak Trnava	0–2	1–1	1–3
2019–20	UEFA Europa League	First qualifying round	(Latvia) RFS	2–3	2–0	4–3
2019–20	UEFA Europa League	Second qualifying round	(Turkey) Yeni Malatyaspor	0–1	2–2	2–3
2020–21 (Note: Only one match per qualifying round was played due to the COVID-19 pandemic.)	UEFA Europa League	First qualifying round	(Iceland) Víkingur Reykjavík	2–1	—N/a	
2020–21	UEFA Europa League	Second qualifying round	(Bosnia and Herzegovina) Zrinjski Mostar	2–3	—N/a	
2021–22	UEFA Europa Conference League	Second qualifying round	(Malta) Birkirkara	1–0	0–1	1–1 (5–4 p)
2021–22	UEFA Europa Conference League	Third qualifying round	(Portugal) Santa Clara	0–1	0–2	0–3
2022–23	UEFA Europa Conference League	First qualifying round	(Luxembourg) Differdange 03	1–1	2–1	3–2
2022–23	UEFA Europa Conference League	Second qualifying round	(Romania) Sepsi Sfântu Gheorghe	2–0	1–3	3–3 (2–4 p)
2023–24	UEFA Champions League	First qualifying round	(Latvia) Valmiera	2–1	2–1	4–2
2023–24	UEFA Champions League	Second qualifying round	(Bulgaria) Ludogorets Razgrad	2–1	1–1	3–2
2023–24	UEFA Champions League	Third qualifying round	(Turkey) Galatasaray	0–3	0–1	0–4
2023–24	UEFA Europa League	Play-off round	(Azerbaijan) Qarabağ	0–2	1–1	1–3
2023–24	UEFA Europa Conference League	Group A	(France) Lille	0–2	0–2	3rd out of 4
2023–24	UEFA Europa Conference League	Group A	(Slovakia) Slovan Bratislava	0–1	2–1	3rd out of 4
2023–24	UEFA Europa Conference League	Group A	(Faroe Islands) KÍ	2–0	0–3	3rd out of 4
2024–25	UEFA Conference League	Second qualifying round	(Ukraine) Polissya Zhytomyr	2–0	2–1	4–1
2024–25	UEFA Conference League	Third qualifying round	(Moldova) Sheriff Tiraspol	3–0	1–0	4–0
2024–25	UEFA Conference League	Play-off round	(Croatia) Rijeka	5–0	1–1	6–1
2024–25	UEFA Conference League	League phase	(Germany) 1. FC Heidenheim	—N/a	1–2	14th out of 36
2024–25	UEFA Conference League	League phase	(Austria) LASK	2–0	—N/a	14th out of 36
2024–25	UEFA Conference League	League phase	(Finland) HJK	—N/a	2–0	14th out of 36
2024–25	UEFA Conference League	League phase	(Northern Ireland) Larne	1–0	—N/a	14th out of 36
2024–25	UEFA Conference League	League phase	(Belgium) Cercle Brugge	1–4	—N/a	14th out of 36
2024–25	UEFA Conference League	League phase	(Poland) Jagiellonia Białystok	—N/a	0–0	14th out of 36
2024–25	UEFA Conference League	Knockout phase play-offs	(Bosnia and Herzegovina) Borac Banja Luka	0–0	0–1	0–1
2025–26	UEFA Champions League	First qualifying round	(Kazakhstan) Kairat	1–1	0–2	1–3
2025–26	UEFA Conference League	Second qualifying round	(Andorra) Inter Club d'Escaldes	4–2	1–1	5–3
2025–26	UEFA Conference League	Third qualifying round	(Albania) Egnatia	0–0	4–2	4–2
2025–26	UEFA Conference League	Play-off round	(Armenia) Noah	1–4	2–3	3–7

Colour key: Green = Olimpija win; Yellow = draw; Red = opponents win.

== Personnel ==
=== Management ===
Last updated: 27 October 2026

Position	Name
President	Adam Delius
Vice president	Christian Dollinger
Director	Igor Barišić
Sporting director	Branko Milovanović
Executive committee	Christian Dollinger; Igor Barišić
Technical director	Luka Vrhunc
Academy director	Admir Krupić

=== Current technical staff ===
Last updated: 9 November 2026

Position	Name
Head coach	Jugoslav Trenchovski
Assistant coach	Narsej Mubi
Assistant coach	Sandi Sejdinovski
Goalkeeping coach	Josip Škorić
Fitness coach	Nikola Vidović
Fitness coach	Ivan Zorić
Fitness coach	Anže Ribič
Analyst	Ivan Brdarić
Physiotherapist	Žiga Benko
Physiotherapist	Luka Levec
Physiotherapist	Riva Milić
Technical manager	Nejc Berce
Equipment manager	Branko Bučar
Assistant equipment manager	Jože Vidergar

=== List of head coaches ===
Head coach	Period	Honours
(Slovenia) Primož Gliha	2005–2007	2005–06 Fifth Division, 2006–07 Fourth Division
(Slovenia) Janez Pate	1 July 2007 – 1 June 2009	2007–08 Third League, 2008–09 Second League
(Slovenia) Branko Oblak	1 July 2009 – 8 August 2009	
(Slovenia) Robert Pevnik	8 September 2009 – 26 May 2010	
(Slovenia) Safet Hadžić	1 July 2010 – 23 August 2010	
(Slovenia) Dušan Kosič	2 October 2010 – 12 December 2011	
(Slovenia) Bojan Prašnikar	12 December 2011 – 25 April 2012	
(Slovenia) Ermin Šiljak	25 April 2012 – 26 August 2012	
(Slovenia) Andrej Razdrh	27 August 2012 – 21 October 2013	
(Serbia) Milorad Kosanović	21 October 2013 – 30 April 2014	
(Slovenia) Darko Karapetrović	30 April 2014 – 17 May 2015	
(Slovenia) Marijan Pušnik	10 June 2015 – 15 December 2015	
(Serbia) Marko Nikolić	11 January 2016 – 18 April 2016	
(Italy) Rodolfo Vanoli	22 April 2016 – 31 August 2016	2015–16 First League
(Slovenia) Luka Elsner	2 September 2016 – 9 March 2017	
(Slovenia) Marijan Pušnik	9 March 2017 – 3 April 2017	
(Slovenia) Safet Hadžić	4 April 2017 – 2 June 2017	
(Croatia) Igor Bišćan	2 June 2017 – 6 June 2018	2017–18 First League, 2017–18 Slovenian Cup
(Serbia) Ilija Stolica	11 June 2018 – 31 July 2018	
(Serbia) Aleksandar Linta	31 July 2018 – 27 August 2018	
(Slovenia) Safet Hadžić	28 August 2018 – 3 September 2018	
(Austria) Zoran Barišić	4 September 2018 – 12 December 2018	
(Slovenia) Robert Pevnik	8 January 2019 – 12 April 2019	
(Slovenia) Safet Hadžić	12 April 2019 – 15 June 2020	2018–19 Slovenian Cup
(Croatia) Dino Skender	19 June 2020 – 8 January 2021	
(Slovenia) Goran Stanković	11 January 2021 – 8 June 2021	2020–21 Slovenian Cup
(Serbia) Savo Milošević	16 June 2021 – 10 October 2021	
(Croatia) Dino Skender	12 October 2021 – 20 March 2022	
(Croatia) Robert Prosinečki	22 March 2022 – 1 July 2022	
(Spain) Albert Riera	4 July 2022 – 31 May 2023	2022–23 First League, 2022–23 Slovenian Cup
(Portugal) João Henriques	1 June 2023 – 13 October 2023	
(Slovenia) Zoran Zeljković	18 October 2023 – 6 May 2024	
(Spain) Víctor Sánchez	6 June 2024 – 13 June 2025	2024–25 First League
(Portugal) Jorge Simão	13 June 2025 – 5 August 2025	
(Netherlands) Erwin van de Looi	11 August 2025 – 22 September 2025	
(Argentina) Federico Bessone	22 September 2025 – 29 May 2026	
(Slovenia) Mišo Brečko	9 June 2026 – 27 July 2026	
(North Macedonia) Jugoslav Trenchovski	28 July 2026 – present	
