= Safet Hadžić (footballer) =

Slovenian footballer and manager

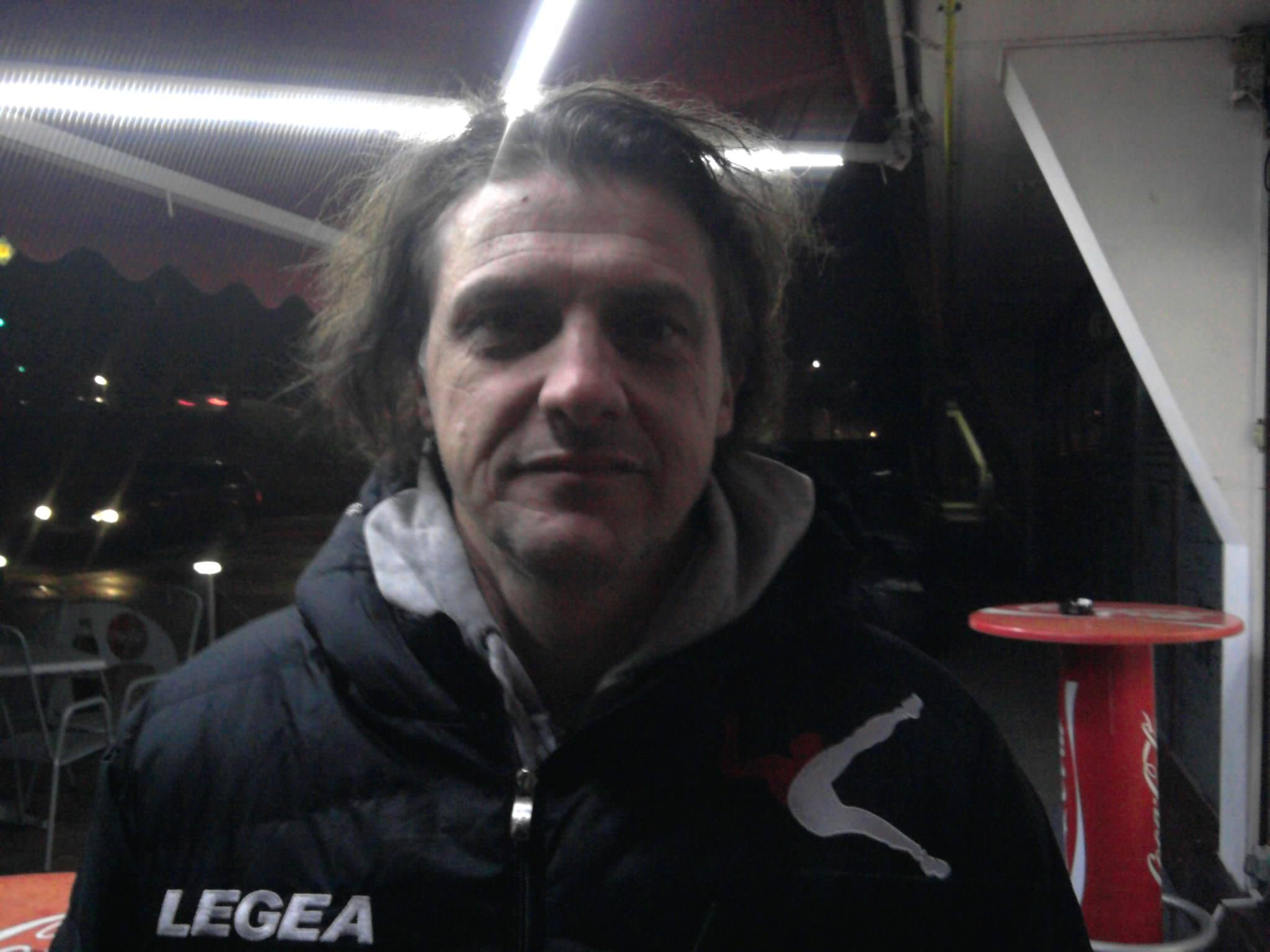

Personal information
- Date of birth: 6 October 1968 (age 58)
- Place of birth: Ljubljana, SFR Yugoslavia
- Position: Defender

Senior career*
| Years | Team | Apps | (Gls) |
| 1985–1992 | Slovan | | |
| 1992–1993 | Gorica | 16 | (0) |
| 1993–1994 | Slovan | 23 | (1) |
| 1994–1995 | Celje | 25 | (1) |
| 1995–1997 | Olimpija | 46 | (3) |
| 1997–1998 | Slavija Vevče | 17 | (1) |
| 1998–1999 | Domžale | 14 | (0) |
| 1999 | Beltinci | 2 | (0) |
| 2000 | Mura | 2 | (0) |
| 2000–2001 | Livar | 16 | (4) |
| 2001–2003 | Ljubljana | 22 | (3) |
| 2005–2006 | Ljubljana | | |
| 2006–2007 | Olimpija Bežigrad | | |

Managerial career
- 2004–2005: Ljubljana
- 2010: Olimpija Ljubljana
- 2011: Bela Krajina
- 2013: Bela Krajina
- 2014–2016: Ivančna Gorica
- 2017: Olimpija Ljubljana
- 2018: Olimpija Ljubljana (caretaker)
- 2019–2020: Olimpija Ljubljana
- 2022: Triglav Kranj
- 2023: Koper
- * Club domestic league appearances and goals

Safet Hadžić (born 6 October 1968) is a Slovenian professional football manager and former player.
