= Diga (footballer) =

Portuguese footballer

Personal information
- Full name: Diogo Miguel Guedes Almeida
- Date of birth: 30 March 1998 (age 28)
- Place of birth: Santa Maria da Feira, Portugal
- Height: 1.73 m (5 ft 8 in)
- Position: Right-back

Team information
- Current team: Olimpija Ljubljana
- Number: 28

Youth career
- 2006–2010: Feirense
- 2010–2012: Sporting CP
- 2012–2017: Feirense

Senior career*
Years	Team	Apps	(Gls)
2017–2022	Feirense	75	(0)
2022–2023	Mafra	25	(1)
2023–2024	Nacional	4	(0)
2024–2025	Feirense	33	(0)
2025–	Olimpija Ljubljana	31	(1)
- * Club domestic league appearances and goals as of 16:47, 14 June 2026 (UTC)

Diogo Miguel Guedes Almeida (born 30 March 1998), known as Diga, is a Portuguese professional footballer who plays as a right-back for Slovenian PrvaLiga club Olimpija Ljubljana.

== Club career ==
=== Feirense ===
Born in Santa Maria da Feira, Aveiro District, Diga started and finished his development at C.D. Feirense and also had a two-year youth spell at Lisbon-based Sporting CP. He made his professional debut with the first team of the former club on 11 November 2017, playing 90 minutes in a 2–1 away loss against Moreirense F.C. in the group stage of the Taça da Liga. His maiden Primeira Liga appearance took place later that month, when he started the 3–1 defeat at S.C. Braga.

After being relegated in 2019, Diga spent a further three campaigns with the side in the Segunda Liga. He made 84 competitive appearances during his spell, failing to score.

=== Mafra ===
Diga signed a one-year contract with second-tier C.D. Mafra on 7 July 2022. He scored his first goal as a senior the following 7 April, in a 2–2 draw away to C.F. Estrela da Amadora.

=== Later career ===
On 12 December 2023, Diga joined C.D. Nacional of the second division on a deal until the end of the season. In July 2024, he returned to Feirense.

Diga moved abroad for the first time in his career on 19 June 2025, signing a two-year contract with Slovenian PrvaLiga club NK Olimpija Ljubljana.
