= Sandi Sejdinovski =

Slovenian football coach (born 1963)

Personal information
- Date of birth: 19 August 1963 (age 63)

Managerial career
- Years: Team
- 1982–1991: Piran (youth)
- 1991–1994: Izola (U18)
- 1992: Izola
- 1994–1997: NK Piran (youth/technical director)
- 1994–1995: Slovenia U16 (assistant)
- 1998–2000: Izola (U18)
- 1999–2000: Slovenia U17 (assistant)
- 2001: DPMM
- 2002–2003: Izola (technical director)
- 2002–2003: Slovenia U18 (assistant)
- 2003–2006: Yadavaran Shalamcheh Football Academy
- 2006–2008: Juventus Academy MNK Izola
- 2008–2009: Al-Shabab (youth)
- 2010: Damash Gilan (assistant)
- 2011: Koper (U19)
- 2011–2014: Al Hilal (U17 and U19)
- 2015: Botev Plovdiv (assistant)
- 2016–2017: Koper (youth)
- 2018-2018: PSG Academy Egypt (interim technical director)
- 2019–2020: Al Jahra (U-20 team head coach)
- 2020–2021: Izola (youth technical director)
- 2021–2023: Al Jahra (first team head coach)
- 2023–2024: Radomlje (first team assistant coach)

Sandi Sejdinovski (born 19 August 1963) is a UEFA "A" licensed Slovenian football coach who has worked in seven different countries: Slovenia, Brunei, Iran, Saudi Arabia, Bulgaria, Egypt, and Kuwait.

== Coaching career ==
Alongside fellow Slovenian Ermin Šiljak, Sejdinovski became one of Bulgarian top-tier sides PFC Botev Plovdiv's assistant coaches in July 2015, specializing in video examination of teams and players' performances. His contract as an assistant was officially ended on November 10, 2015. Before going to Bulgaria, the coach helped train and oversee the U17 team of the Saudi side Al-Hilal.

He worked in FC Koper's youth department from June 2016 to October 2017.

=== Philosophy ===
While working with Al-Hilal's U17 team, Sejdinovski believed that giving players step-by-step technical, tactical, physical, and mental training was paramount and applied a match preparation system similar to that of a professional club in order to ease the transition into full-time football.

The Slovenian has expressed disappointment in Asia's football development.
