= Nikola Vidović =

Croatian sports coach

Nikola Vidović (born 23 November 1964) is a Croatian physical coach. He is currently the athletic coach of Slovenian club NK Olimpija Ljubljana.

Vidović was the national champion of Croatia at kickboxing. In 2007, he became the athletic coach at German football club FC Ingolstadt 04. In 2009, when the manager Thorsten Fink moved to Swiss club FC Basel, he brought a number of his training staff with him, including Heiko Vogel and Vidović. As Fink moved on to his next station as a manager of Hamburger SV in October 2011, Vidović followed him.

After Fink moved to Cyprus and signed as APOEL FC head coach in January 2015, Vidović worked alongside him as APOEL's fitness coach.

Vidović again followed Fink to Riga FC in January 2022.

In May 2023, he moved to Slovenian PrvaLiga side NK Olimpija Ljubljana as an athletic coach.
