= Veljko Jelenković =

Association football player (born 2003)

Personal information
- Date of birth: 5 June 2003 (age 23)
- Place of birth: Novi Sad, Serbia and Montenegro
- Height: 1.87 m (6 ft 2 in)
- Position: Defender

Team information
- Current team: Olimpija Ljubljana
- Number: 4

Youth career
- 2014–2021: Vojvodina

Senior career*
Years	Team	Apps	(Gls)
2021–2023	Vojvodina	0	(0)
2021	→ Bečej (loan)		
2022	→ Kabel (loan)	15	(0)
2023	Slavia Sofia II	2	(0)
2023–2025	Slavia Sofia	63	(0)
2025–	Olimpija Ljubljana	21	(0)

International career
2018–2019	Serbia U16	5	(0)
2019–2020	Serbia U17	7	(0)
2023–2024	Bulgaria U21	12	(0)
- * Club domestic league appearances and goals as of 14:01, 10 March 2026 (UTC)

Veljko Jelenković (Bulgarian: Велко Йеленкович; Serbian Cyrillic: Вељко Јеленковић; born 5 June 2003) is a professional footballer who plays as a defender for Slovenian PrvaLiga club Olimpija Ljubljana. He represented both Serbia and Bulgaria internationally.

== Club career ==
Born in Novi Sad, Serbia and Montenegro, Jelenković is the son of former Litex Lovech player Nebojša Jelenković. He started his youth career with Vojvodina. At the beginning of the 2021–22 season, Jelenković went on loan to Bečej. Then, he made his professional debut by playing on loan for Kabel in the 2021–22 Serbian First League. In January 2023 he moved to Slavia Sofia. Jelenković made his debut in Bulgaria in a league match against Pirin Blagoevgrad on 13 January 2023.

== International career ==
Jelenković holds dual citizenship, making him available for both Serbia and Bulgaria. In 2019, he was called up to Serbia U17 for the 2020 UEFA European Under-17 Championship qualification matches. In October 2022, it was reported that Bulgaria's manager, Mladen Krstajić, wants Jelenković to join Bulgaria national team. On 18 March 2023, he received his first call-up to the Bulgaria U21 team for the Antalya Cup, held between 25 and 28 March.

== Career statistics ==
As of 20 February 2026

Appearances and goals by club, season and competition
Club performance			League		National cup		Continental		Other		Total	
Club	League	Season	Apps	Goals	Apps	Goals	Apps	Goals	Apps	Goals	Apps	Goals
Kabel (loan)	Serbian First League	2021–22	15	0	0	0	—		—		15	0
Slavia Sofia	Bulgarian First League	2022–23	13	0	1	0	—		—		14	0
Slavia Sofia	Bulgarian First League	2023–24	21	0	2	0	—		—		23	0
Slavia Sofia	Bulgarian First League	2024–25	29	0	2	1	—		—		31	1
Slavia Sofia	Total		63	0	5	1	0	0	0	0	68	1
Olimpija Ljubljana	Slovenian PrvaLiga	2025–26	18	0	1	1	8	1	—		27	2
Career total			96	0	6	2	8	1	0	0	110	3
