= Bassirou N'Diaye =

Senegalese footballer (born 2002)

Personal information
- Date of birth: 15 February 2002 (age 24)
- Place of birth: Senegal
- Height: 1.81 m (5 ft 11 in)
- Position: Striker

Team information
- Current team: Cannes
- Number: 3

Senior career*
| Years | Team | Apps | (Gls) |
| 2021–2023 | Sochaux B | 39 | (23) |
| 2023–2025 | Lorient | 5 | (0) |
| 2023–2025 | Lorient B | 10 | (3) |
| 2024 | → Servette (loan) | 0 | (0) |
| 2025– | Cannes | 0 | (0) |
- * Club domestic league appearances and goals as of 23:58, 10 May 2025 (UTC)

Bassirou N'Diaye (born 15 February 2002) is a Senegalese professional footballer who plays as a striker for Ligue 3 club Cannes.

== Early life ==
N'Diaye is a native of Thiès, Senegal. He started playing football at the age of six.

== Career ==
N'Diaye started his career with French side Sochaux. He was one the top scorers of the 2022–23 Championnat National 3 with twenty-one goals. In 2023, he signed for French Ligue 1 side Lorient. He was regarded as a prospect. In 2024, he was sent on loan to Swiss side Servette.

== Style of play ==
N'Diaye mainly operates as a striker. He is known for his speed.
