= Kobi Bajc =

Slovenian footballer (born 2007)

Personal information
- Date of birth: 7 June 2007 (age 19)
- Place of birth: Slovenia
- Height: 1.94 m (6 ft 4 in)
- Position: Midfielder

Team information
- Current team: Ilirija 1911

Youth career
- 2014–2015: Svoboda Ljubljana
- 2015–2025: Bravo
- 2025–: Maribor

Senior career*
Years	Team	Apps	(Gls)
2024–2025	Bravo	0	(0)
2025–2026	Maribor	1	(0)
2026–	Ilirija 1911	0	(0)

International career
2022	Slovenia U15	3	(0)
2022	Slovenia U16	3	(0)
2024–2025	Slovenia U18	3	(0)
2024	Slovenia U19	2	(0)
- * Club domestic league appearances and goals as of 7 August 2026

Kobi Bajc (born 7 June 2007) is a Slovenian professional footballer who plays as a midfielder for Slovenian Second League club Ilirija 1911.

== Early life ==
Kobi Bajc was born on 7 June 2007 in Slovenia to a Ghanaian father and a Slovenian mother.

== Club career ==
Bajc joined the Bravo youth academy as a youth player in 2015 at the age of eight. He made his senior debut for Bravo in a Slovenian Cup game against Krka, where he also scored in an eventual 5–0 win. Following his stint there, he joined the youth academy of Maribor in September 2025 and was promoted to the club's senior team the same year.

== International career ==
Bajc is eligible to represent Slovenia through his birthplace and Ghana due to his Ghanaian father. On 5 September 2024, he debuted for the Slovenia under-19 team in a 1–1 friendly draw against Qatar under-19.
