= Nikša Vujčić =

Serbian footballer

Personal information
- Date of birth: 25 September 1998 (age 28)
- Place of birth: Šabac, FR Yugoslavia
- Height: 1.85 m (6 ft 1 in)
- Position: Attacking midfielder

Team information
- Current team: Domžale
- Number: 4

Senior career*
Years	Team	Apps	(Gls)
2017	Provo		
2017–2018	Železničar Lajkovac		
2018–2019	Žarkovo		
2019–2020	Loznica		
2020	Žarkovo	13	(0)
2020–2021	Mačva Šabac	2	(0)
2021–2022	Jagodina		
2022–2023	Metalac GM	28	(0)
2024	Rogaška	16	(0)
2024–	Domžale	21	(0)
- * Club domestic league appearances and goals as of 10 October 2025

Nikša Vujčić (Serbian Cyrillic: Никша Вујчић; born 25 September 1998) is a Serbian professional footballer who plays for Domžale in the Slovenian PrvaLiga.

While with Mačva Šabac, he made two appearances in the Serbian SuperLiga.
