= Dimitar Mitrovski =

Macedonian footballer (born 1999)

Personal information
- Full name: Dimitar Mitrovski; Димитар Митровски
- Date of birth: 28 January 1999 (age 27)
- Place of birth: Skopje, Macedonia
- Height: 1.76 m (5 ft 9 in)
- Position: Right wing

Team information
- Current team: Varaždin
- Number: 17

Youth career
- 2010–2015: Rabotnički
- 2015–2016: Hansa
- 2015–2017: Magdeburg
- 2017–2020: Sporting

Senior career*
Years	Team	Apps	(Gls)
2020–2021	Sporting B	32	(3)
2022–2023	Akademija Pandev	31	(6)
2023–2025	Varaždin	68	(13)
2025-	NK Olimpija Ljubljana	0	(0)

International career^{‡}
2015	North Macedonia U17	5	(2)
2016–2017	North Macedonia U18	4	(4)
2017–2018	North Macedonia U19	8	(3)
2018–2022	North Macedonia U21	18	(7)
2023–	North Macedonia	11	(0)
- * Club domestic league appearances and goals as of 27 June 2025 ‡ National team caps and goals as of 8 October 2026

Dimitar Mitrovski (Macedonian: Димитар Митровски; born 28 January 1999) is a Macedonian professional footballer who plays as a midfielder for Olimpija Ljubljana and the North Macedonia national team.

== Career ==
=== Club career ===
Mitrovski made his senior football debut on 13 February 2022 at the age of 23, by playing the opening 68 minutes Akademija Pandev against Shkupi in the nineteenth round of the 2021–22 Macedonian First Football League season. That season he went on to play 15 games, throughout which he also scored two goals and picked up 3 assists.

On 22 December 2022, Mitrovski joined Croatian Football League club Varaždin on a deal until June 2026.

=== International ===
Ever since 2015 Mitrovski has been regular at most of North Macedonia's national youth teams.

On 30 August 2023, he also got his first call-up for the North Macedonia national football team, for the UEFA Euro 2024 qualifying matches against Italy and Malta.
