= 2008 Slovenian Supercup =

- Event: 2008 Slovenian Supercup
| Domžale | Interblock |
| 0 | 0 |
- Interblock won 7–6 on penalties
- Date: 9 July 2008
- Venue: Sports Park, Domžale
- Referee: Robert Kranjc
- Attendance: 2,000

The 2008 Slovenian Supercup was a football match that saw the 2007–08 PrvaLiga champions Domžale face off against the Slovenian Cup winners Interblock. The match was held on 9 July 2008 at the Sports Park in Domžale. After 120 minutes of no goals, Interblock won their first Slovenian Supercup title by defeating Domžale 7–6 on penalties.

== Match details ==
9 July 2008
20:45 CEST

| Domžale | 0–0 (a.e.t.) | Interblock |
|---|---|---|
| | Report |
Penalties
| Žinko (penalty scored); Brezič (penalty scored); Zatkovič (penalty missed); Semler (penalty scored); Kirm (penalty scored); Knezović (penalty scored); Čavušević (penalty scored); L. Elsner (penalty missed) | 6–7 | (penalty scored) Rakovič; (penalty scored) Jukan; (penalty scored) Rendulić; (penalty missed) Zahora; (penalty scored) Zeljkovič; (penalty scored) Grabič; (penalty scored) R. Elsner; (penalty scored) Matič |

Sports Park, Domžale
Attendance: 2,000
Referee: Robert Kranjc

| Domžale | Interblock |

Domžale:
| GK | 77 | (Slovenia) Dejan Nemec |
| RB | 3 | (Slovenia) Janez Aljančič |
| CB | 29 | (Slovenia) Luka Elsner (c) |
| CB | 25 | (Croatia) Ivan Knezović |
| LB | 5 | (Slovenia) Rok Hanžič |
| RM | 10 | (Brazil) Juninho | | (substituted off) 20' |
| CM | 23 | (Slovenia) Luka Žinko | (yellow card) 112' |
| CM | 76 | (Slovenia) Danijel Brezič | (yellow card) 80' |
| LM | 30 | (Slovenia) Andraž Kirm | (yellow card) 100' |
| CF | 19 | (Slovenia) Mitja Zatkovič |
| CF | 9 | (Slovenia) Jože Benko | | (substituted off) 68' |
Substitutes:
| GK | 22 | (Slovenia) Darko Brljak |
| DF | 2 | (Slovenia) Darko Zec |
| DF | 87 | (Slovenia) Tadej Apatič |
| MF | 26 | (Slovenia) Jalen Pokorn |
| MF | 24 | (Slovenia) David Sviben |
| FW | 9 | (Slovenia) Borut Semler | | (substituted on) 20' |
| FW | 16 | (Slovenia) Džengis Čavušević | | (substituted on) 68' |
Manager:
(Slovenia) Robert Pevnik

Interblock:
| GK | 22 | (Slovenia) Matjaž Rozman |
| RB | 19 | (Slovenia) Erik Salkič |
| CB | 11 | (Slovenia) Rok Elsner | (yellow card) 70' |
| CB | 5 | (Slovenia) Igor Lazič | (yellow card) 28' | (substituted off) 46' |
| LB | 3 | (Slovenia) Suvad Grabus |
| RM | 7 | (Slovenia) Aleksandar Rodič | (yellow card) 23' | (substituted off) 70' |
| DM | 15 | (Slovenia) Darijan Matič |
| DM | 33 | (Slovenia) Dejan Grabič |
| LM | 4 | (Slovenia) Dejan Gerič | | (substituted off) 46' |
| CM | 18 | (Slovenia) Amer Jukan |
| CF | 8 | (Slovenia) Ermin Rakovič (c) | (yellow card) 100' |
Substitutes:
| GK | 1 | (Slovenia) Janez Strajnar |
| DF | 6 | (Slovenia) Janez Zavrl |
| DF | 9 | (Slovenia) Martin Pregelj |
| DF | 17 | (Croatia) Krunoslav Rendulić | | (substituted on) 70' |
| MF | 14 | (Slovenia) Zoran Zeljkovič | | (substituted on) 46' |
| FW | 10 | (Croatia) Dario Zahora | | (substituted on) 46' |
| FW | 12 | (Croatia) Ivan Jolić |
Manager:
(Croatia) Dragan Skočić

Match officials

- Assistant referees:
  - Robert Zirnstein
  - Bojan Ul
- Fourth official: Dragoslav Perić

Man of the Match

- Matjaž Rozman (Interblock)

Match rules

- 90 minutes.
- 30 minutes of extra time if scores level
- Penalty shoot-out if scores still level
- Seven named substitutes
- Maximum of 3 substitutions.

== See also ==
- 2007–08 Slovenian PrvaLiga
- 2007–08 Slovenian Football Cup
