= 2009–10 Slovenian Football Cup =

Tournament details
- Country: Slovenia
- Teams: 30

Final positions
- Champions: Maribor (6th title)
- Runners-up: Domžale

Tournament statistics
- Matches played: 35
- Goals scored: 139 (3.97 per match)
- Top goal scorer(s): Slaviša Dvorančič (6 goals)

The 2009–10 Slovenian Football Cup was the 19th season of the Slovenian Football Cup, Slovenia's football knockout competition. The tournament system was changed for this season.

== Qualified clubs ==
=== 2008–09 Slovenian PrvaLiga members ===
- Maribor
- Celje
- Rudar Velenje
- Domžale
- Gorica
- Nafta Lendava
- Interblock
- Koper
- Primorje
- Drava Ptuj

=== Qualified through MNZ Regional Cups ===
- MNZ Ljubljana: Olimpija, Bela Krajina, Radomlje
- MNZ Maribor: Železničar Maribor, Dravograd, Slivnica
- MNZ Celje: Dravinja, Zreče
- MNZ Koper: Jadran Dekani, Ankaran
- MNZ Nova Gorica: Tolmin, Idrija
- MNZ Murska Sobota: Mura 05, Serdica
- MNZ Lendava: Črenšovci, Odranci
- MNZG-Kranj: Triglav Kranj, Kranj
- MNZ Ptuj: Aluminij, Stojnci

== Preliminary round ==
These matches took place on 2 September 2009.

2 September 2009	Radomlje	2–1	Kranj	Radomlje
17:00 CEST	Šmajd 8' (o.g.); Žeželj 19'	Report	Miškič 75' (o.g.); Pavlica (red card) 89'; Pašagić (red card) 90'	Stadium: Radomlje Sports Park; Attendance: 100; Referee: Želimirko Pavlović

2 September 2009	Železničar Maribor	8–4	Serdica	Maribor
17:00 CEST	Furek 25', 80', 87'; Kerndl 47'; Lenič 51'; Ruis 65', 89'; Muminović 75'	Report	Isufi 29'; Horvat 36'; Koder 66' (o.g.); Turza 76'	Stadium: Tabor Sports Park; Attendance: 200; Referee: Roman Glažar

== First round ==
These matches took place on 16 September 2009.

16 September 2009	Odranci	2–1 (a.e.t.)	Dravinja	Odranci
16:00 CEST	Tkalec 90'; Kovač 96'	Report	Matič 57'; Močič (red card) 19'	Stadium: ŠRC Odranci; Attendance: 150; Referee: Bojan Tkalčič

16 September 2009	Črenšovci	1–1 (a.e.t.) (6–5 p)	Tolmin	Črenšovci
16:00 CEST	Žugelj 41'	Report	Kalaković 88'	Stadium: Črenšovci Sports Park; Attendance: 50; Referee: Želimirko Pavlović
	Penalties
	Kustec (penalty scored); Tompa (penalty scored); Balažic (penalty scored); Kulčar (penalty scored); Maučec (penalty scored); Gonc (penalty scored)		(penalty scored) Kolman; (penalty scored) Mrak; (penalty scored) Kragelj; (penalty scored) Mandić; (penalty scored) Kalaković

16 September 2009	Jadran Dekani	0–4	Nafta	Dekani
16:00 CEST	Ivančič (red card) 3'	Report	Koplárovics 32', 85'; Pohlen 47' (o.g.); Volaš 84'	Stadium: Dekani Sports Park; Attendance: 60; Referee: Janez Babnik

16 September 2009	Triglav Kranj	2–1 (a.e.t.)	Aluminij	Kranj
16:00 CEST	Burgar 71'; Mišić 115'	Report	Bingo 84'; Rotman (yellow card) (yellow-red card) 105'	Stadium: Stanko Mlakar Stadium; Attendance: 150; Referee: Slavko Vinčić

16 September 2009	Ankaran	0–0 (a.e.t.) (3–4 p)	Primorje	Ankaran
16:00 CEST		Report	Čoralič (yellow card) (yellow-red card) 92'	Stadium: ŠRC Katarina; Attendance: 50; Referee: Jože Vehar
	Penalties
	Valenčič (penalty scored); Simeunović (penalty scored); Brčina (penalty scored)		(penalty scored) Petran; (penalty scored) Marijanović; (penalty scored) Ogrič; (penalty scored) Ostojič

16 September 2009	Stojnci	1–0	Bela Krajina	Stojnci
16:00 CEST	Topolovec 28'; D. Čeh (yellow card) (yellow-red card) 84'	Report		Stadium: Stojnci Sports Park; Attendance: 70; Referee: Boris Tošeski

16 September 2009	Idrija	0–4	Koper	Idrija
16:00 CEST		Report	Hadžič 12'; Ipavec 66'; Brulc 83'; Božičič 88'	Stadium: Idrija City Stadium; Attendance: 300; Referee: Aleksander Likič

16 September 2009	Zreče	0–8	Celje	Zreče
16:00 CEST	Vrejič (red card) 46'	Report	Biščan 58'; Dvorančič 62', 67', 82', 85'; Horvat 64'; Korun 77'; Kamberović 80'	Stadium: Zreče Stadium; Attendance: 200; Referee: Roman Glažar

16 September 2009	Železničar Maribor	0–3	Drava	Maribor
16:00 CEST		Report	Vrabl 35'; Kronaveter 72'; Zajc 88'	Stadium: Tabor Sports Park; Attendance: 200; Referee: Vojko Goričan

16 September 2009	Radomlje	1–5	Olimpija	Radomlje
16:00 CEST	Žeželj 11'	Report	Cvijanović 42'; da Silva 67'; Tiganj 72'; Ibraimi 81', 84'	Stadium: Radomlje Sports Park; Attendance: 300; Referee: Emir Huselja

16 September 2009	Slivnica	0–5	Mura 05	Slivnica pri Mariboru
16:00 CEST		Report	Kremenovič 5'; Flisar 82', 89'; Slavic 84'; Puc 89'	Stadium: NK Slivnica Stadium; Attendance: 200; Referee: Nejc Kajtazović

16 September 2009	Koroška Dravograd	0–5	Domžale	Dravograd
16:00 CEST		Report	Čavušević 20', 51', 67', 76'; Zec 75'	Stadium: Dravograd Sports Centre; Attendance: 250; Referee: Boris Jeneš

== Second round ==
Gorica, Interblock, Maribor and Rudar Velenje received byes to this round. These matches took place on 20 and 21 October 2009.

20 October 2009	Črenšovci	0–5	Gorica	Črenšovci
14:00 CEST	Slana (yellow card) (red card) 90'	Report	Brečević 22'; Cvijanović 24' (pen.); Osterc 27'; Galešić 45'; Rakušček 88'	Stadium: Črenšovci Sports Park; Attendance: 250; Referee: Vojko Goričan

21 October 2009	Stojnci	2–6	Nafta	Stojnci
14:00 CEST	Nežmah 27'; Pernek 85'	Report	Čeh 2'; Miljiković 12'; Janković 22'; Koplárovics 68', 72'; Bunc 74'	Stadium: Stojnci Sports Park; Attendance: 100; Referee: Janez Babnik

21 October 2009	Odranci	0–2	Interblock	Odranci
14:00 CEST		Report	Horvat 35'; Iličič 79'; Jelečević (yellow card) (red card) 81'	Stadium: ŠRC Odranci; Attendance: 300; Referee: Andrej Žnidaršič

21 October 2009	Koper	2–4	Rudar Velenje	Koper
14:00 CEST	Ipavec 25'; Kovačevič 86'	Report	Trifković 15', 42'; Mešić 32', 72'	Stadium: Bonifika Stadium; Attendance: 300; Referee: Slavko Vinčić

21 October 2009	Mura 05	3–5	Celje	Murska Sobota
14:00 CEST	Slavic 34'; Bjelkanović 50' (o.g.); Flisar 82'	Report	Bezjak 33', 90+8'; Dvorančič 45', 84'; Gobec 72'	Stadium: Fazanerija; Attendance: 350; Referee: Boris Tošeski

21 October 2009	Olimpija	0–1	Maribor	Ljubljana
14:00 CEST		Report	Školnik 27'	Stadium: ŽŠD Ljubljana; Attendance: 1,700; Referee: Davor Drečnik

21 October 2009	Drava	2–3	Domžale	Ptuj
14:00 CEST	Ugochukwu 20'; Ekpoki 48'	Report	Zatkovič 26'; Šturm 31'; Hanžič 50'	Stadium: City Stadium; Attendance: 100; Referee: Andrej Tratnjek

21 October 2009	Triglav Kranj	4–0	Primorje	Kranj
14:00 CEST	Burgar 13'; Marijan 18'; Mišić 47'; Bajrić 89'	Report		Stadium: Stanko Mlakar Stadium; Attendance: 200; Referee: Gregor Gostenčnik

== Quarter-finals ==
The first legs took place on 17 March 2010 and the second legs took place on 24 March 2010.

=== First legs ===
17 March 2010	Interblock	1–1	Nafta	Ljubljana
15:00 CET	Tabot 45'	Report	Volaš 78'	Stadium: ŽŠD Ljubljana; Attendance: 150; Referee: Roman Glažar

17 March 2010	Maribor	5–1	Triglav Kranj	Maribor
15:00 CET	Tavares 56', 68'; Jelič 60'; Plut 67'; Bunderla 75'	Report	Burgar 14'	Stadium: Ljudski vrt Attendance: 700; Referee: Miran Bukovec

17 March 2010	Domžale	1–1	Gorica	Domžale
15:00 CET	Zatkovič 57'	Report	Demirović 8'	Stadium: Sports Park; Attendance: 500; Referee: Slavko Vinčić

17 March 2010	Rudar Velenje	0–1	Celje	Velenje
15:00 CET		Report	Rep 6'	Stadium: Ob Jezeru; Attendance: 500; Referee: Dragoslav Perić

=== Second legs ===
24 March 2010	Nafta	3–0 (4–1 agg.)	Interblock	Lendava
15:00 CET	Volaš 45'; Repina 59'; Benko 69' (pen.)	Report		Stadium: Lendava Sports Park; Attendance: 600; Referee: Roberto Ponis

24 March 2010	Triglav Kranj	2–2 (3–7 agg.)	Maribor	Kranj
15:00 CET	Burgar 57', 86'	Report	Flávio 58'; Mertelj 60'	Stadium: Stanko Mlakar Stadium; Attendance: 1,000; Referee: Andrej Tratnjek

24 March 2010	Gorica	0–1 (1–2 agg.)	Domžale	Nova Gorica
17:00 CET		Report	Pekič 27'	Stadium: Sports Park; Attendance: 250; Referee: Bojan Mertik

24 March 2010	Celje	1–0 (2–0 agg.)	Rudar Velenje	Celje
17:00 CET	Rep 86'	Report		Stadium: Arena Petrol; Attendance: 800; Referee: Davor Drečnik

== Semi-finals ==
The four winners from the previous round competed in this round. The first legs took place on 13 and 14 April 2010 and the second legs took place on 21 April 2010.

=== First legs ===
13 April 2010	Maribor	4–1	Celje	Maribor
20:00 CEST	Jelić 10'; Tavares 21'; Mertelj 66'; Mezga 86'	Report	Lovrečič 71' (pen.)	Stadium: Ljudski vrt Attendance: 1,500; Referee: Matej Jug

14 April 2010	Nafta	1–1	Domžale	Lendava
17:00 CEST	Volaš 28'	Report	Pekič 55'	Stadium: Sports Park; Attendance: 1,000; Referee: Slavko Vinčić

=== Second legs ===
21 April 2010	Celje	3–3 (4–7 agg.)	Maribor	Celje
17:30 CEST	Romih 12'; Bezjak 22'; Purišić 66'	Report	Jelić 37'; Anđelković 76'; Plut 90+2'	Stadium: Arena Petrol; Attendance: 800; Referee: Darko Čeferin

21 April 2010	Domžale	3–0 (4–1 agg.)	Nafta	Domžale
17:30 CEST	Zatkovič 4'; Topič 30'; Pekič 59'	Report		Stadium: Sports Park; Attendance: 300; Referee: Peter Šart

== Final ==
8 May 2010
20:00 CEST

Maribor	3–2 (a.e.t.)	Domžale
Tavares 42', 55'; Bunderla 120'	Report	Brezovački 31'; Pekič 45'

Ljudski vrt, Maribor
Attendance: 6,500
Referee: Damir Skomina
