= Krunoslav Rendulić =

Croatian football manager (born 1973)

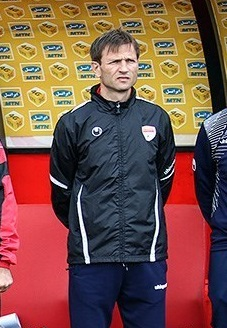
- Rendulić in 2016

Personal information
- Date of birth: 26 September 1973 (age 53)
- Place of birth: Vinkovci, SFR Yugoslavia
- Height: 1.76 m (5 ft 9 in)
- Position: Defender

Youth career
- Osijek

Senior career*
Years	Team	Apps	(Gls)
1992–1994	Osijek	21	(0)
1994–1996	Belišće	26	(3)
1995–1997	Osijek	22	(1)
1997–1999	Šibenik	56	(5)
1999–2000	NK Zagreb	45	(1)
2001–2002	Hajduk Split	26	(1)
2002–2005	Kamen Ingrad	81	(10)
2005–2007	Rijeka	56	(1)
2007–2009	Interblock	36	(2)
2009–2010	Lučko	36	(1)
2011	NK Zagreb	10	(0)
2011–2012	Lučko	39	(0)
2013	Vinogradar	13	(0)
2013–2014	Lučko	7	(0)
Total		474	(25)

Managerial career
- 2018–2019: Istra 1961
- 2019–2021: Šibenik
- 2021–2022: Gorica
- 2022–2023: Zrinjski Mostar
- 2024: Sabah
- * Club domestic league appearances and goals

Krunoslav Rendulić (pronounced [krǔnoslaʋ rěndulit͡ɕ]; born 26 September 1973) is a Croatian professional football manager and former player.

== Playing career ==
Rendulić's professional career spanned over two decades. During this time he mainly played with the clubs in the Croatian First League, with a two-year stint in the Slovenian PrvaLiga with Interblock. In total Rendulić collected over 450 appearances during his career; 368 in the Croatian top flight which puts him in top 5 of most appearances in the Croatian First League. He finished his professional career at the end of the 2013–14 season, starting his work as a manager.

During his stints with Hajduk Split, Rijeka and Interblock, Rendulić won the 2000–01 Croatian First League, 2005–06 Croatian Cup, 2007–08 and 2008–09 Slovenian Cups, and the 2008 Slovenian Supercup.

== Managerial career ==
Rendulić started his managerial career in 2014 as an assistant coach under manager Dragan Skočić at Iranian side Foolad. They left club in 2016, while in 2017 Rendulić started to work as assistant coach under the coaching staff of Luka Bonačić at Qatari club Al-Arabi.

=== Istra 1961 ===
On 28 October 2018, Rendulić was appointed manager of Prva HNL club Istra 1961, replacing Curro Torres. On 4 March 2019, following a series of poor results, Rendulić terminated his contract with Istra.

=== Šibenik ===
On 20 June 2019, Rendulić became manager of Druga HNL club Šibenik where he played for two years during his club career.

He made his debut as Šibenik manager in a 3–2 home victory against Hajduk Split II. On 25 September, Šibenik qualified for the quarter-finals of the 2019–20 Croatian Cup defeating Slavonija Požega. On 3 December, Šibenik lost 4–0 to Lokomotiva at home in the cup quarter-finals.

On 20 May 2020, the Croatian Football Federation canceled the 2019–20 Druga HNL season due to the COVID-19 pandemic in the country and Šibenik was promoted to the highest tier of Croatian football after eight years of playing in the third and second divisions.

A series of four defeats and two draws in six games during the forty days-period in the league, resulted in the dismissal of Rendulić on 23 March 2021.

=== Gorica ===
On 30 May 2021, Rendulić joined Gorica as manager. Despite a good start to the 2021–22 season, Rendulić got sacked after poor results in the latter part of the season in March 2022.

=== Zrinjski Mostar ===
On 30 November 2022, Rendulić was appointed to replace Sergej Jakirović as manager of Bosnian Premier League club Zrinjski Mostar. In his first game in charge, Zrinjski beat Laktaši in a Bosnian Cup game on 19 February 2023. On 8 March 2023, he won his first Mostar derby as a manager in a 3–1 victory over rivals Velež.

After a fourteen-game winning streak, Rendulić suffered his first defeat as Zrinjski manager on 26 April 2023 in a 3–2 loss to Sarajevo. On 30 April, he managed Zrinjski to a 2–0 win against Posušje, winning the club's eighth league title four rounds before the end of the season. Rendulić won the club's first ever double by beating rivals Velež in the cup final on 17 May 2023. On 25 May 2023, he earned the Bosnian Premier League Manager of the Season award.

In August 2023, Zrinjski became the first ever club from Bosnia and Herzegovina to reach the group stages of a European club competition after eliminating Icelandic club Breiðablik in the 2023–24 UEFA Europa League third qualifying round, which assured the club of a group stage spot in the UEFA Europa Conference League as a minimum. After losing to LASK in the Europa League play-off round, Zrinjski dropped into the Conference League group stage, where they were drawn into Group E alongside Aston Villa, AZ and Legia Warsaw. On matchday one, Rendulić's side pulled off an astonishing comeback against AZ. Trailing 3–0 at half time, the team made history and came back to win 4–3.

Following defeats from Legia Warsaw in the Conference League, and from rivals Velež in the domestic league, Rendulić mutually terminated his contract with Zrinjski on 18 November 2023.

== Career statistics ==
Appearances and goals by club, season and competition
Club performance			League		Cup		League Cup		Continental		Total	
Season	Club	League	Apps	Goals	Apps	Goals	Apps	Goals	Apps	Goals	Apps	Goals
Croatia			League		Croatian Cup		Super Cup		Europe		Total	
1992–93	Osijek	Prva HNL	11	0	2	0	–	–	–	–	13	0
1993–94	Osijek	Prva HNL	10	0	3	0	–	–	–	–	13	0
1994–95	Belišće	Prva HNL	13	1	0	0	–	–	–	–	13	1
1995–96	Belišće	Prva B HNL	13	2	2	0	–	–	–	–	15	2
1995–96	Osijek	Prva HNL	6	0	1	0	–	–	–	–	7	0
1996–97	Osijek	Prva HNL	16	1	1	0	–	–	–	–	17	1
1997–98	Šibenik	Prva HNL	29	2	1	0	–	–	–	–	30	2
1998–99	Šibenik	Prva HNL	27	3	1	0	–	–	–	–	28	3
1999–2000	NK Zagreb	Prva HNL	31	0	6	0	–	–	–	–	37	0
2000–01	NK Zagreb	Prva HNL	14	1	2	1	–	–	–	–	16	2
2000–01	Hajduk Split	Prva HNL	10	1	3	0	–	–	–	–	13	0
2001–02	Hajduk Split	Prva HNL	16	0	6	0	–	–	4	0	26	0
2002–03	Kamen Ingrad	Prva HNL	26	1	3	0	–	–	–	–	29	1
2003–04	Kamen Ingrad	Prva HNL	28	3	4	0	–	–	4	0	36	3
2004–05	Kamen Ingrad	Prva HNL	27	6	1	0	–	–	2	0	30	6
2005–06	Rijeka	Prva HNL	28	1	8	0	1	0	2	1	39	2
2006–07	Rijeka	Prva HNL	28	0	4	0	1	0	2	0	35	0
Slovenia			League		Slovenian Cup		Super Cup		Europe		Total	
2007–08	Interblock	Slovenian PrvaLiga	22	2	2	1	–	–	–	–	24	1
2008–09	Interblock	Slovenian PrvaLiga	14	0	2	0	1	0	3	0	20	0
Croatia			League		Croatian Cup		Super Cup		Europe		Total	
2009–10	Lučko	Druga HNL	25	1	–	–	–	–	–	–	25	1
2010–11	Lučko	Druga HNL	11	0	–	–	–	–	–	–	11	0
2010–11	NK Zagreb	Prva HNL	10	0	–	–	–	–	–	–	10	0
2011–12	Lučko	Prva HNL	25	0	0	0	–	–	–	–	25	0
2012–13	Lučko	Druga HNL	14	0	–	–	–	–	–	–	14	0
2012–13	Vinogradar	Druga HNL	13	0	–	–	–	–	–	–	13	0
2013–14	Lučko	Druga HNL	7	0	1	0	–	–	–	–	8	0
Country	Croatia		438	23	49	1	2	0	14	1	503	25
Country	Slovenia		36	2	4	1	1	0	3	0	44	3
Country	Total		474	25	53	2	3	0	17	1	547	28

== Managerial statistics ==
As of match played 15 August 2024

Managerial record by team and tenure
Team	From	To	Record							
Team	From	To	G	W	D	L	GF	GA	GD	Win %
Istra 1961	28 October 2018	4 March 2019	11	2	2	7	6	13	−7	18.18
Šibenik	20 June 2019	23 March 2021	50	23	7	20	61	59	+2	46.00
Gorica	30 May 2021	3 March 2022	29	11	5	13	45	50	−5	37.93
Zrinjski Mostar	30 November 2022	18 November 2023	47	31	5	11	104	48	+56	65.96
Sabah	5 March 2024	25 November 2024	29	13	7	9	23	22	+1	44.83
Total			166	80	26	60	239	192	+47	48.19

== Honours ==
=== Player ===
Hajduk Split

- Prva HNL: 2000–01

Rijeka

- Croatian Cup: 2005–06

Interblock

- Slovenian Cup: 2007–08, 2008–09
- Slovenian Supercup: 2008

=== Manager ===
Šibenik

- Druga HNL: 2019–20

Zrinjski Mostar

- Bosnian Premier League: 2022–23
- Bosnian Cup: 2022–23

Individual

- Bosnian Premier League Manager of the Season: 2022–23
