= 2007 Slovenian Supercup =

- Event: 2007 Slovenian Supercup
Domžale	Koper
2	1
- Date: 14 July 2007
- Venue: Sports Park, Domžale
- Referee: Matjaž Bohinc
- Attendance: 700

The 2007 Slovenian Supercup was a football match that saw the 2006–07 PrvaLiga champions Domžale face off against Slovenian Cup champions Koper. The match was held on 14 July 2007 at the Sports Park in Domžale.

== Match details ==
14 July 2007
20:45 CEST

Domžale	2–1	Koper
Žinko 4', 7'	Report	Rajčević 10'

Sports Park, Domžale
Attendance: 700
Referee: Matjaž Bohinc

Domžale	Koper

Domžale:
GK	77	(Slovenia) Dejan Nemec
RB	3	(Slovenia) Janez Aljančič
CB	29	(Slovenia) Luka Elsner (c)	(substituted off) 69'
CB	4	(Slovenia) Velimir Varga
LB	87	(Slovenia) Tadej Apatič
RM	10	(Brazil) Juninho
CM	15	(Czech Republic) Jaroslav Peškar	(substituted off) 46'
CM	23	(Slovenia) Luka Žinko
LM	7	(Serbia) Siniša Janković	(substituted off) 59'
FW	19	(Croatia) Dario Zahora
FW	20	(Slovenia) Zlatan Ljubijankić
Substitutes:
GK	22	(Slovenia) Darko Brljak
DF	2	(Slovenia) Darko Zec
MF	30	(Slovenia) Andraž Kirm	(substituted in) 69'
MF	76	(Slovenia) Danijel Brezič	(substituted in) 46'
MF	11	(Slovenia) Dejan Grabič	(substituted in) 59'
FW	9	(Slovenia) Tim Lo Duca
FW	8	(Slovenia) Slaviša Dvorančič
Manager:
(Slovenia) Slaviša Stojanović

Koper:
GK	1	(Slovenia) Ermin Hasić (c)
RB	6	(Slovenia) Enes Handanagić	(yellow card) 23'
CB	21	(Slovenia) Aleš Mejač
CB	28	(Slovenia) Mitja Viler	(yellow card) 63'
LB	26	(Slovenia) Aleksander Rajčević
RM	33	(Slovenia) Saša Božičič
MF	16	(Slovenia) Rok Božič
MF	8	(Slovenia) Emanuel Galun		(substituted off) 46'
LM	19	(Slovenia) Dalibor Volaš
FW	10	(Nigeria) Sunday Chibuke Ibeji		(substituted off) 66'
FW	7	(Slovenia) Vito Plut		(substituted off) 55'
Substitutes:
GK	30	(Slovenia) Admir Suhonjić
DF	17	(Slovenia) Miloš Sučević (substituted in) 46'
MF	18	(Slovenia) Amer Jukan
MF	20	(Slovenia) Rok Božič
MF	4	(Slovenia) Elvis Šahinović		(substituted in) 55'
FW	22	(Slovenia) Edin Sečić		(substituted in) 66'
FW	9	(Slovenia) Patrik Bordon
Manager:
(Slovenia) Vlado Badžim

Match officials

- Assistant referees:
  - Milan Kogej
  - Bojan Ul
- Fourth official: Darko Čeferin

Man of the Match

- Luka Žinko (Interblock)

Match rules

- 90 minutes.
- 30 minutes of extra time if scores level
- Penalty shoot-out if scores still level
- Seven named substitutes
- Maximum of 3 substitutions.

== See also ==
- 2006–07 Slovenian PrvaLiga
- 2006–07 Slovenian Football Cup
