= Zoran Zeljković =

Slovenian football manager (born 1980)

Personal information
- Date of birth: 9 May 1980 (age 46)
- Place of birth: Ljubljana, SR Slovenia, Yugoslavia
- Height: 1.72 m (5 ft 8 in)
- Position: Central midfielder

Team information
- Current team: Celje (manager)

Senior career*
Years	Team	Apps	(Gls)
2001–2002	Livar	28	(3)
2002–2003	Ljubljana	18	(2)
2003–2007	Domžale	101	(4)
2007–2009	Interblock	56	(9)
2009–2010	APOP	24	(3)
2010–2011	Olimpija Ljubljana	23	(3)
2011–2013	Pécs	34	(2)
2013–2014	Krka	20	(1)
2014–2015	SC Pinkafeld	26	(2)
2015–2016	Bravo	11	(1)
Total		341	(30)

International career
2006	Slovenia B	1	(0)
2008	Slovenia	1	(0)

Managerial career
- 2018–2019: Ilirija 1911
- 2019–2021: Krka
- 2021–2023: Koper
- 2023–2024: Olimpija Ljubljana
- 2024–2025: Auda
- 2025: Rodina Moscow
- 2025–2026: Koper
- 2026–: Celje
- * Club domestic league appearances and goals

Zoran Zeljković (born 9 May 1980) is a Slovenian professional football manager and former player who is the current head coach of Slovenian PrvaLiga club Celje.

He made one appearance for the Slovenia national team, in 2008 against Sweden.

== Honours ==
Domžale

- Slovenian PrvaLiga: 2006–07

Interblock

- Slovenian Cup: 2007–08, 2008–09
- Slovenian Supercup: 2008
