= Andraž Kirm =

Slovenian footballer (born 1984)

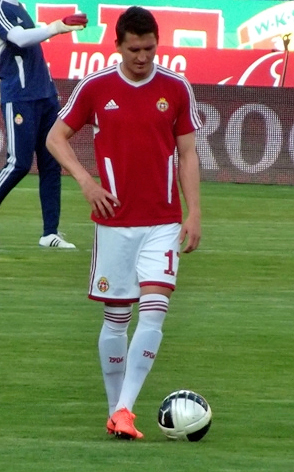
- Kirm with Wisła Kraków in 2012

Personal information
- Date of birth: 6 September 1984 (age 42)
- Place of birth: Ljubljana, SR Slovenia, SFR Yugoslavia
- Height: 1.83 m (6 ft 0 in)
- Position: Midfielder

Youth career
- 1991–2002: Šmartno

Senior career*
Years	Team	Apps	(Gls)
2002–2003	Slovan	17	(1)
2004–2005	Svoboda	38	(4)
2005–2009	Domžale	127	(22)
2009–2012	Wisła Kraków	83	(16)
2012–2014	FC Groningen	56	(3)
2014–2016	Omonia	53	(11)
2016–2017	Olimpija Ljubljana	31	(2)
2017–2018	Domžale	25	(1)
2019–2022	Bravo	66	(2)
Total		496	(62)

International career
2006	Slovenia U21	2	(0)
2007–2016	Slovenia	71	(6)
- * Club domestic league appearances and goals

Andraž Kirm (born 6 September 1984) is a Slovenian former professional footballer who played as a midfielder. Besides Slovenia, he has played in Poland, the Netherlands, and Cyprus.

== Club career ==
=== Slovenia ===
Kirm started his career at Šmartno, and moved to Slovan in 2002. In 2004, he left for another club based in the Slovenian capital, Svoboda, where he established himself as a first team player. His talent didn't go unnoticed and he subsequently joined the Slovenian first division club Domžale in the summer of 2005. In his first 2005–06 season, he made 29 league appearances for the eventual league runners-up. In the following campaigns (2006–07 and 2007–08), he won back-to-back championships with Domžale as well as winning the 2007 Slovenian Supercup. In the 2008–09 season, Kirm led the league in assists.

=== Wisła Kraków ===
On 2 July 2009, he moved to Ekstraklasa champions Wisła Kraków for an undisclosed fee from Domžale and signed for five years. He immediately established himself as a regular in the team, playing in all 37 competition matches in the 2009–10 season, while Wisła finished second in the league. In the following campaign, he won the Ekstraklasa championship with Wisła Kraków and was the club's top goalscorer with nine goals in the league.

=== Groningen ===
On 30 August 2012, Kirm joined Eredivisie club Groningen on a contract until 2014.

=== Omonia ===
In 2014, after his contract with Groningen ended, Kirm moved to Cypriot First Division club Omonia. He scored eleven league goals in two seasons, and left the club in 2016 when his contract ended.

=== Olimpija Ljubljana ===
On 25 June 2016, he signed for Slovenian champions Olimpija Ljubljana.

== International career ==
Kirm made his debut for the Slovenia national team in August 2007 in a friendly against Montenegro in Podgorica. In his second appearance for the national team, Kirm provided the assist for Milivoje Novaković's goal in a 3–0 UEFA Euro 2008 qualifying win over Luxembourg. Since then, he has become one of the most important players of the team led by Matjaž Kek. Kirm was the only player, besides Novaković, who played in all 2010 FIFA World Cup qualification matches. He also appeared in the starting lineup in both play-off matches with Russia, after which Slovenia qualified for the final tournament. At the 2010 FIFA World Cup, he played in all three group stage games. Overall, he earned a total of 71 caps, scoring 6 goals.

== Career statistics ==
=== Club ===
As of 1 July 2014

Appearances and goals by club, season and competition
Club	Season	League			National cup (Note: Includes Slovenian Cup, Polish Cup, KNVB Cup)		Continental		Total	
Club	Season	Division	Apps	Goals	Apps	Goals	Apps	Goals	Apps	Goals
Slovan	2002–03	3. SNL	7	1	—		—		7	1
Slovan	2003–04	3. SNL	10	0	—		—		10	0
Slovan	Total		17	1	—		—		17	1
Svoboda	2003–04	2. SNL	8	0	—		—		8	0
Svoboda	2004–05	2. SNL	30	4	1	0	—		31	4
Svoboda	Total		38	4	1	0	—		39	4
Domžale	2005–06	PrvaLiga	29	0	1	0	1 (Note: Appearance(s) in UEFA Cup)	0	31	0
Domžale	2006–07	PrvaLiga	31	6	1	0	2	0	34	6
Domžale	2007–08	PrvaLiga	32	9	3	0	4 (Note: Appearances in UEFA Champions League)	0	39	9
Domžale	2008–09	PrvaLiga	35	7	2	0	4	0	41	7
Domžale	Total		127	22	7	0	11	0	145	22
Wisła Kraków	2009–10	Ekstraklasa	30	3	4	0	2	0	36	3
Wisła Kraków	2010–11	Ekstraklasa	25	9	3	0	2 (Note: Appearances in UEFA Europa League)	0	30	9
Wisła Kraków	2011–12	Ekstraklasa	27	4	4	0	12 (Note: Four appearances in UEFA Champions League, eight appearances and two goals in UEFA Europa League)	2	43	6
Wisła Kraków	2012–13	Ekstraklasa	1	0	0	0	—		1	0
Wisła Kraków	Total		83	16	11	0	16	2	110	18
Groningen	2012–13	Eredivisie	31	1	2	0	—		33	1
Groningen	2013–14	Eredivisie	25	2	2	0	—		27	2
Groningen	Total		56	3	4	0	0	0	60	3
Career total			321	46	23	0	27	2	371	48

=== International ===
Appearances and goals by national team and year
National team	Year	Apps	Goals
Slovenia
Slovenia	2007	6	0
Slovenia	2008	9	0
Slovenia	2009	9	1
Slovenia	2010	11	2
Slovenia	2011	8	0
Slovenia	2012	7	2
Slovenia	2013	9	1
Slovenia	2014	6	0
Slovenia	2015	4	0
Slovenia	2016	2	0
Total		71	6

Scores and results list Slovenia's goal tally first, score column indicates score after each Kirm goal.

List of international goals scored by Andraž Kirm
No.	Date	Venue	Opponent	Score	Result	Competition
1	12 August 2009	Ljudski vrt, Maribor, Slovenia	San Marino	3–0	5–0	2010 World Cup qualification
2	3 March 2010	Ljudski vrt, Maribor, Slovenia	Qatar	3–0	4–1	Friendly
3	4 June 2010	Ljudski vrt, Maribor, Slovenia	New Zealand	3–1	3–1	Friendly
4	29 February 2012	Bonifika Stadium, Koper, Slovenia	Scotland	1–0	1–1	Friendly
5	15 August 2012	Stožice Stadium, Ljubljana, Slovenia	Romania	4–2	4–3	Friendly
6	7 June 2013	Laugardalsvöllur, Reykjavík, Iceland	Iceland	1–0	4–2	2014 World Cup qualification

== Honours ==
Domžale

- PrvaLiga: 2006–07, 2007–08
- Slovenian Supercup: 2007

Wisła Kraków

- Ekstraklasa: 2010–11
