= Dragan Skočić =

Croatian footballer and manager

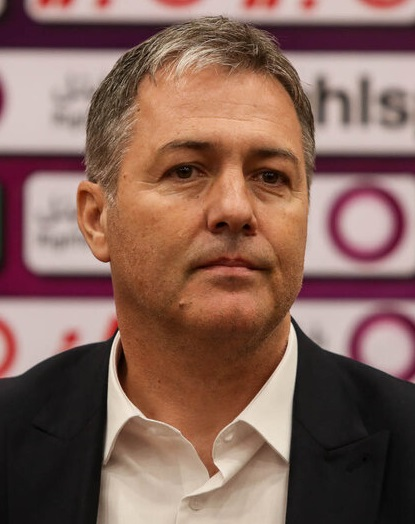
- Skočić in 2020

Personal information
- Date of birth: 3 September 1968 (age 58)
- Place of birth: Rijeka, SR Croatia, Yugoslavia
- Position: Midfielder

Senior career*
Years	Team	Apps	(Gls)
1987–1991	Rijeka	20	(2)
1991–1993	Las Palmas	41	(6)
1993–1996	Compostela	12	(0)
1996	Rijeka	2	(0)
2001–2004	Novalja		
2004	Al-Ittihad Kalba		

Managerial career
- 2005–2006: Rijeka
- 2007–2008: Interblock
- 2009–2010: Al-Arabi
- 2011: Al Nassr
- 2012: Rijeka
- 2013–2014: Malavan
- 2014–2016: Foolad
- 2018: Khooneh be Khooneh
- 2019–2020: Sanat Naft
- 2020–2022: Iran
- 2023–2024: Croatia U21
- 2024–2026: Tractor
- * Club domestic league appearances and goals

Dragan Skočić (born 3 September 1968) is a Croatian professional football coach and former player.

Skočić played as a midfielder in Croatia, Spain and the UAE for Rijeka, Las Palmas, Compostela, Novalja and Al-Ittihad Kalba.

== Playing career ==
Skočić, a midfielder, played professional club football in Croatia for Rijeka and NK Novalja, in Spain for Las Palmas and Compostela, and in the UAE for Al-Ittihad Kalba. He was the first player from the Croatian football league who went abroad to play professionally.

== Coaching career ==
=== Early career ===
After his playing career, Skočić went on to complete the Football Academy at the Croatian Football Academy and the Coach Education and Training Department at the Zagreb Faculty of Kinesiology, receiving an UEFA-PRO Coach diploma and a Professional Bachelor of the Coaching Profession.

=== Rijeka ===
He became manager of his hometown club, Rijeka, in 2005. Skočić secured one trophy for the club, winning the Croatian Cup for the 2005–06 season.

=== Interblock Ljubljana ===
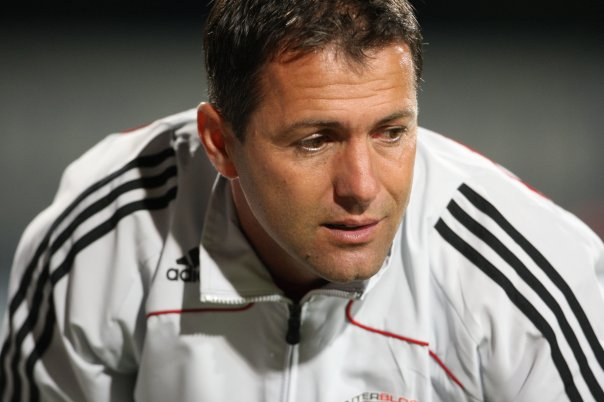
Skočić with Interblock

In 2007, he became the head coach of the Slovenian club Interblock Ljubljana, while the club was in a difficult situation on the league scale. Only two years after the club was founded and under the management of Skočić, the club achieved outstanding results in the Slovenian PrvaLiga. Not only did they manage to stay in the first league, but they also won two trophies in the 2007–08 season, the Slovenian Cup and a Super Cup.

=== Al Arabi ===
Skočić took a year long sabbatical from coaching following his time at Interblock, and in the 2009–10 season, he took over the management of the Al-Arabi club in Kuwait. Under his leadership as head coach, the club played in two finals, the Crown Prince Cup and the Federation Cup. Also under Skočić, Al-Arabi played in the AFC Cup quarter-finals.

=== Al Nassr ===
Following Kuwait, in the 2010–11 season, Skočić was engaged by the Al Nassr football club from Riyadh, Saudi Arabia, one of the most prominent football clubs in the Arab world. Under Skočić, Al Nassr qualified for the third round of the AFC Champions League, after having played a successful season of competitions within the group. On 25 May 2011, he was sacked after a disappointing 4–1 loss to 2010 AFC Champions League finalists Zob Ahan, and was replaced by Portuguese boss Eurico Gomes.

=== Return to Rijeka ===
In March 2012 Skočić returned to take over the management of his hometown club Rijeka by replacing Ivo Ištuk as head coach, and became the third coach to take charge of the club in the 2011–12 Prva HNL season. Skočić inherited a defensively frail side that was 2 points off the relegation zone and was tasked with saving the team from relegation. Upon a 2–0 defeat to Cibalia, the club fell to the 12th place in the league. After just 43 days in charge, Skočić was relieved of his position, following a series of poor results, and was replaced by his assistant, Mladen Ivančić.

=== Malavan ===
On 26 May 2013, Skočić was announced as head coach of Malavan for the upcoming season. He signed a two-year contract with the club. He led the club to the seventh place, their best league finish since 2005.

=== Foolad ===
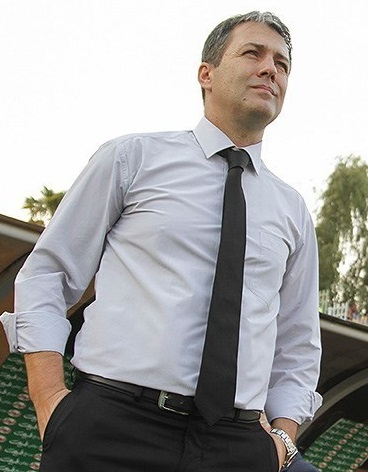
Skočić with Foolad in 2014

On 23 May 2014, Skočić was named as new head coach of Iran Pro League title-holders Foolad, on a one-year contract, replacing Hossein Faraki who resigned on the following day. In May 2015, Skočić received the award for coach of the month and signed a two-year contract extension to keep him at the club until July 2017. In November 2015 after poor scores with the club, Skočić was linked with the vacant head coach position at Sepahan F.C. but the job went to his compatriot, Igor Štimac. After an unsuccessful transfer to Sepahan, he remained as Foolad's head coach according to his contract. He left the club on 1 June 2016.

=== Khooneh be Khooneh Babol ===
On 16 January 2018 he became manager of F.C. Khooneh be Khooneh (Rayka Babol) replacing formerly resigned Javad Nekounam. He soon went on a streak by getting 13 points out of his first 5 games and also leading the second-tier team into Hazfi Cup's final.

=== Sanat Naft ===
In July 2019 he became manager of Sanat Naft.

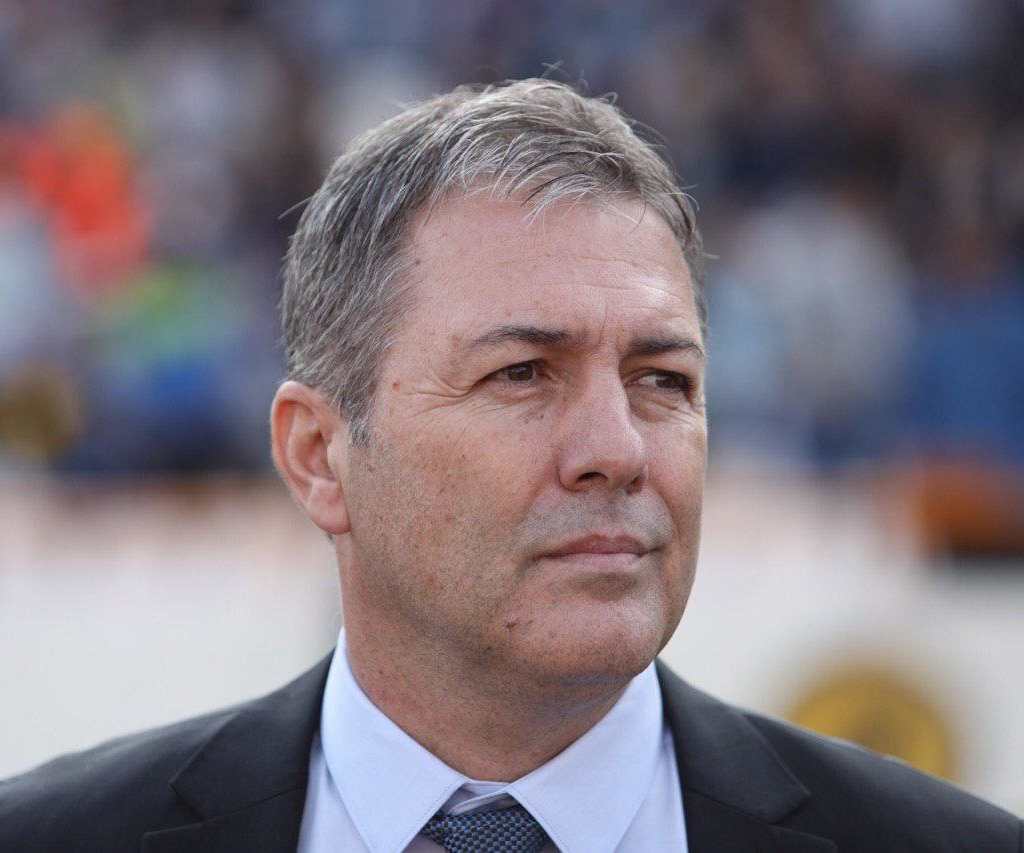
Skočić in November 2019

=== Iran national team ===
On 6 February 2020, Skočić was named head coach of the Iran national team. He managed to take Iran to the 2022 World Cup as the winner of Group A by scoring 25 points out of 10 matches in the third round of the World Cup qualifiers and set the best performance of the Iran national football team in the World Cup qualifiers.

He was replaced as the Iranian national team manager on 7 September 2022.

=== Croatia national under-21 team ===
On 14 April 2023, Dragan Skočić was appointed as the manager of the Croatia national under-21 team.

=== Tractor ===
In July 2024 he became manager of Iranian club Tractor.

In his first season with Tractor, he won the Iranian league for the first time in Tractor's history, as well as the Iranian Super Cup.

He resigned in February 2026.

== Career statistics ==
Appearances and goals by club, season and competition
Club	Season	League			National cup (Note: Includes Yugoslav Cup, Copa del Rey, Croatian Cup.)		Continental		Total	
Club	Season	Division	Apps	Goals	Apps	Goals	Apps	Goals	Apps	Goals
Rijeka	1987–88	Yugoslav First League	0	0	0	0	–		0	0
Rijeka	1988–89	Yugoslav First League	0	0	0	0	–		0	0
Rijeka	1989–90	Yugoslav First League	1	0	0	0	–		1	0
Rijeka	1990–91	Yugoslav First League	19	2	4	0	–		23	2
Las Palmas	1991–92	Segunda División	7	0	0	0	–		7	0
Las Palmas	1992–93	Segunda División B	34	6	–		–		34	6
SD Compostela	1993–94	Segunda División	9	0	1	0	–		9	0
SD Compostela	1994–95	La Liga	2	0	0	0	–		2	0
SD Compostela	1995–96	La Liga	1	0	2	0	–		3	0
Rijeka	1995–96	Prva HNL	2	0	1	0	–		3	0
Career total			75	8	8	0	0	0	83	8

== Honours ==
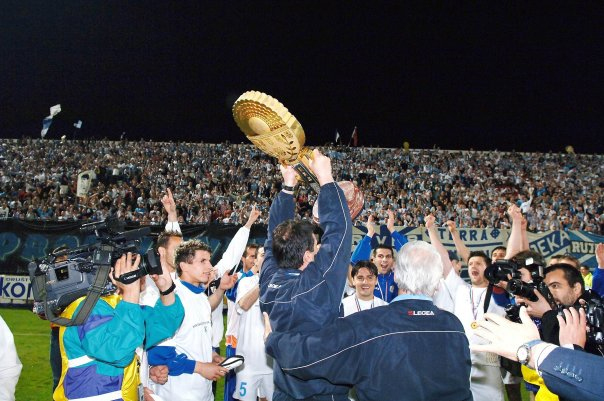
Skočić winning the Croatian Cup with Rijeka in 2006

=== Player ===
Las Palmas

- Segunda División B: 1992–93

Compostela

- Segunda División: 1993–94

=== Manager ===
Rijeka

- Croatian Cup: 2005–06

Interblock Ljubljana

- Slovenian Cup: 2007–08
- Slovenian Supercup: 2008

Khoone be Khoone

- Hazfi Cup Runner-up: 2017–18

Tractor

- Persian Gulf Pro League: 2024–25
- Iranian Super Cup: 2025
