= Darijan Matić =

Slovenian footballer (born 1983)

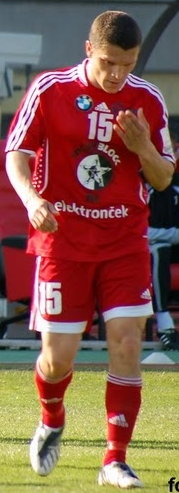
- Matić with Interblock in 2009

Personal information
- Date of birth: 28 May 1983 (age 43)
- Place of birth: Ljubljana, SFR Yugoslavia
- Height: 1.75 m (5 ft 9 in)
- Position: Defensive midfielder

Team information
- Current team: Tabor Sežana (head coach)

Youth career
- Slovan
- –2001: Factor

Senior career*
| Years | Team | Apps | (Gls) |
| 2001 | Factor | 2 | (0) |
| 2002 | Triglav Kranj | 12 | (0) |
| 2002 | Ljubljana | 5 | (0) |
| 2003 | Triglav Kranj | 30 | (4) |
| 2004 | Koper | 12 | (0) |
| 2004 | Olimpija | 16 | (1) |
| 2005–2006 | Domžale | 46 | (7) |
| 2006–2007 | Shinnik Yaroslavl | 14 | (0) |
| 2007 | → Spartak Nalchik (loan) | 15 | (0) |
| 2008–2009 | Interblock | 45 | (4) |
| 2009–2010 | Rapid București | 30 | (1) |
| 2010 | Bnei Sakhnin | 12 | (0) |
| 2011–2013 | Kryvbas Kryvyi Rih | 50 | (2) |
| 2014–2017 | Olimpija Ljubljana | 84 | (1) |
| 2017 | → Mura (loan) | 11 | (2) |
| 2019 | SV Egg | 11 | (3) |
| Total | | 395 | (25) |

International career
| 2000–2001 | Slovenia U17 | 7 | (0) |
| 2001 | Slovenia U18 | 9 | (0) |
| 2002–2003 | Slovenia U20 | 7 | (0) |
| 2003–2005 | Slovenia U21 | 21 | (0) |
| 2006–2012 | Slovenia | 10 | (0) |

Managerial career
- 2018: Šenčur
- 2021: Olimpija Ljubljana (assistant)
- 2021–2022: Krško
- 2022–2023: Celje (assistant)
- 2023–2024: Sheriff Tiraspol (assistant)
- 2024: Triglav Kranj (assistant)
- 2024–2025: Triglav Kranj
- 2025–: Tabor Sežana
- * Club domestic league appearances and goals

Darijan Matić (born 28 May 1983) is a Slovenian professional football manager and former player.

== International career ==
Matić made his debut for Slovenia on 4 June 2006 in a friendly match against Ivory Coast, coming on as a late substitute in place of Milivoje Novaković in an eventual 3–0 defeat.

== Honours ==
Interblock

- Slovenian Cup: 2007–08, 2008–09
- Slovenian Supercup: 2008

Olimpija Ljubljana

- Slovenian First League: 2015–16
