= Rok Elsner =

Slovenian footballer (born 1986)

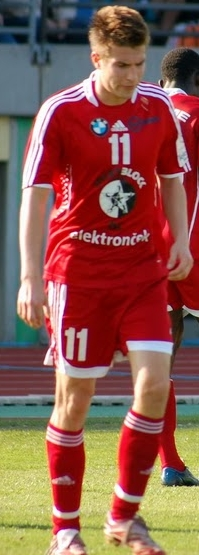
- Elsner with Interblock in 2009

Personal information
- Date of birth: 25 January 1986 (age 40)
- Place of birth: Ljubljana, SFR Yugoslavia
- Height: 1.86 m (6 ft 1 in)
- Position: Defensive midfielder

Team information
- Current team: DSG Ferlach

Youth career
- 1991–2005: Nice

Senior career*
Years	Team	Apps	(Gls)
2004–2005	Nice B	3	(0)
2005–2006	SV Wehen Wiesbaden	13	(0)
2006–2009	Interblock	81	(2)
2009–2010	Al-Arabi SC		
2010	Haugesund	5	(0)
2011–2013	Śląsk Wrocław	53	(6)
2013–2014	Aris	13	(0)
2014	Haugesund	9	(0)
2014–2015	Energie Cottbus	15	(0)
2015	Energie Cottbus II	1	(0)
2015	Olimpia Grudziądz	17	(3)
2016	Hunan Billows	26	(0)
2017	Domžale	4	(0)
2017	Željezničar	5	(0)
2018	Triglav Kranj	32	(1)
2019	Al-Nasr SC		
2021–	DSG Ferlach	123	(34)

International career
2001	Slovenia U16	4	(0)
2004	Slovenia U18	1	(1)
2006–2007	Slovenia U20	6	(3)
2006–2008	Slovenia U21	13	(0)
- * Club domestic league appearances and goals as of 30 June 2026

Rok Elsner (born 25 January 1986) is a Slovenian footballer who plays as a defensive midfielder for Austrian club DSG Ferlach.

== Personal life ==
His grandfather, Branko, and his father, Marko, were both footballers. His older brother, Luka, is a football manager and former player.

== Honours ==
Interblock

- Slovenian Cup: 2007–08, 2008–09
- Slovenian Supercup: 2008

Śląsk Wrocław

- Ekstraklasa: 2011–12
- Polish Super Cup: 2012

Domžale

- Slovenian Cup: 2016–17
