= Rok Kronaveter =

Slovenian footballer (born 1986)

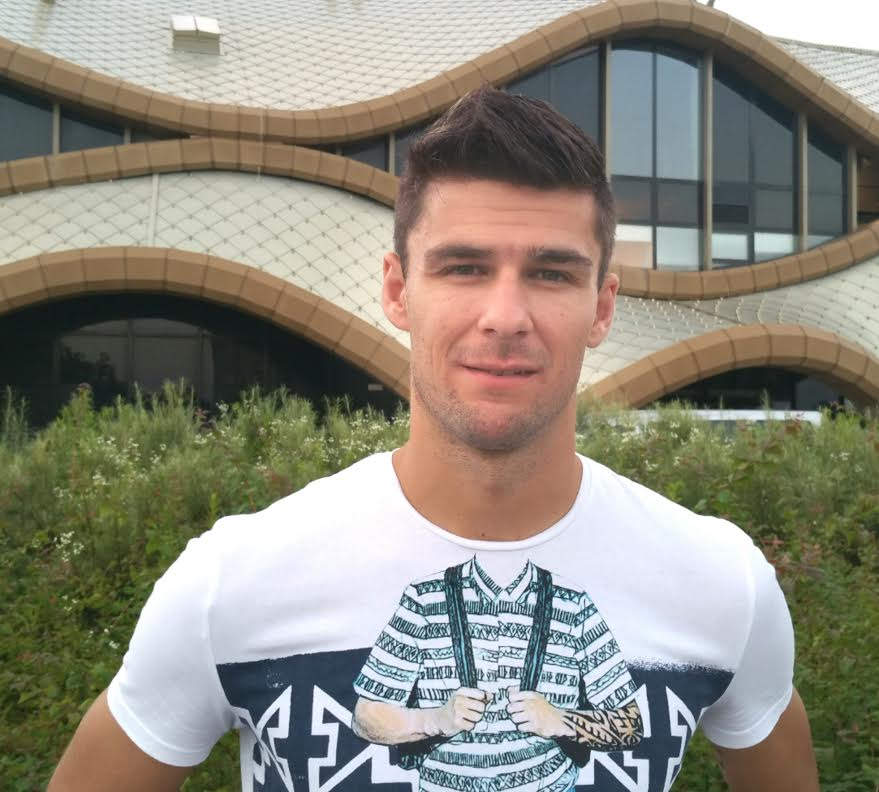
- Kronaveter in 2016

Personal information
- Date of birth: 7 December 1986 (age 39)
- Place of birth: Maribor, SFR Yugoslavia
- Height: 1.87 m (6 ft 2 in)
- Position: Midfielder

Team information
- Current team: Malečnik

Youth career
- 1997–2005: Železničar Maribor

Senior career*
Years	Team	Apps	(Gls)
2003–2005	Železničar Maribor	59	(34)
2005–2009	Drava Ptuj	111	(28)
2010	Rudar Velenje	15	(4)
2010–2012	Energie Cottbus	31	(3)
2011	Energie Cottbus II	6	(0)
2012–2014	Győri ETO	38	(7)
2015	Petrolul Ploiești	12	(2)
2015–2019	Olimpija Ljubljana	94	(44)
2019–2023	Maribor	115	(30)
2023–2024	SV Allerheiligen	25	(6)
2024–2026	FC Gamlitz	37	(9)
2026–	Malečnik		

International career
2006	Slovenia U20	2	(1)
2005–2007	Slovenia U21	6	(0)
2016	Slovenia	4	(1)
2017	Slovenia B	2	(1)
- * Club domestic league appearances and goals as of 13 February 2026

Rok Kronaveter (born 7 December 1986) is a Slovenian footballer who plays as a midfielder for Malečnik.

== Club career ==
Kronaveter began his football career playing for hometown club Železničar Maribor at the age of ten. On 16 March 2003, at the age of 16, he made his senior début for the team during the Slovenian Second League match against Jadran Hrpelje-Kozina, appearing as a second-half substitute. In the summer of 2006, he joined the top division side Drava Ptuj and signed his first professional contract. In January 2010, he signed a one-year contract with Rudar Velenje.

In August 2010, Kronaveter moved abroad for the first time and joined Energie Cottbus, signing a three-year contract. However, his contract was terminated in June 2012, and he signed for Hungarian side Győri ETO soon afterwards. With Győri, he won his first career honour as the team won the 2012–13 national title. He left Győri in September 2014 by mutual consent. After almost six months without a club, he signed for Romanian side Petrolul Ploiești in March 2015.

In June 2015, Kronaveter returned to Slovenia and signed for Olimpija Ljubljana. With Olimpija, he won two league titles (2015–16 and 2017–18); in 2015–16, he was also the league's top goalscorer with 17 goals. In June 2019, Kronaveter signed a two-year contract with Olimpija's arch-rivals Maribor. For Maribor, he scored on his début during the 2019–20 UEFA Champions League first qualifying round match against Valur, converting a late-game penalty kick for a 3–0 victory.

== International career ==
Between 2005 and 2007, Kronaveter played for Slovenian under-20 and under-21 teams, for which he scored one goal in eight appearances. He made his debut for the senior team on 30 May 2016 in a 0–0 draw against Sweden.

Kronaveter scored his first international goal for Slovenia on 8 October 2016 in a 1–0 victory over Slovakia.

== Personal life ==
Rok Kronaveter was born in Maribor, Slovenia (then part of Yugoslavia), and lived in Malečnik as a toddler, before moving to Maribor at the age of two. His father was a footballer, while his mother was a handball player. His older brother, David, is also a former footballer. Growing up his idol was Brazilian forward Ronaldo.

In 2012, Kronaveter married his long-term partner Sandra. He has two children, a daughter Adriana (born 2011) and a son Lukas (2013).

== Career statistics ==
=== Club ===
As of match played 20 May 2023

Appearances and goals by club, season and competition
Club	Season	League			National cup		League cup		Continental		Other		Total	
Club	Season	Division	Apps	Goals	Apps	Goals	Apps	Goals	Apps	Goals	Apps	Goals	Apps	Goals
Železničar Maribor	2002–03	Slovenian Second League	15	4	0	0	—		—		—		15	4
Železničar Maribor	2003–04	Slovenian Third League	23	14	0	0	—		—		—		23	14
Železničar Maribor	2004–05	Slovenian Third League	18	14	2	3	—		—		—		20	17
Železničar Maribor	2005–06	Slovenian Third League	3	2	—		—		—		—		3	2
Železničar Maribor	Total		59	34	2	3	0	0	0	0	0	0	61	37
Drava Ptuj	2005–06	Slovenian PrvaLiga	26	10	1	0	—		—		—		27	10
Drava Ptuj	2006–07	Slovenian PrvaLiga	27	8	1	0	—		—		—		28	8
Drava Ptuj	2007–08	Slovenian PrvaLiga	11	1	1	0	—		—		—		12	1
Drava Ptuj	2008–09	Slovenian PrvaLiga	28	5	1	0	—		—		2 (Note: Appearances in Slovenian PrvaLiga relegation play-offs)	3	31	8
Drava Ptuj	2009–10	Slovenian PrvaLiga	19	4	2	1	—		—		—		21	5
Drava Ptuj	Total		111	28	6	1	0	0	0	0	2	3	119	32
Rudar Velenje	2009–10	Slovenian PrvaLiga	12	3	2	0	—		—		—		14	3
Rudar Velenje	2010–11	Slovenian PrvaLiga	3	1	0	0	—		—		—		3	1
Rudar Velenje	Total		15	4	2	0	0	0	0	0	0	0	17	4
Energie Cottbus	2010–11	2. Bundesliga	14	1	3	0	—		—		—		17	1
Energie Cottbus	2011–12	2. Bundesliga	17	2	0	0	—		—		—		17	2
Energie Cottbus	Total		31	3	3	0	0	0	0	0	0	0	34	3
Energie Cottbus II	2011–12	Regionalliga	6	0	—		—		—		—		6	0
Győri ETO	2012–13	Nemzeti Bajnokság I	19	5	6	2	4	4	—		—		29	11
Győri ETO	2013–14	Nemzeti Bajnokság I	15	2	3	0	6	2	1 (Note: Appearance in UEFA Champions League)	0	—		25	4
Győri ETO	2014–15	Nemzeti Bajnokság I	4	0	0	0	0	0	2 (Note: Appearances in UEFA Europa League)	0	—		6	0
Győri ETO	Total		38	7	9	2	10	6	3	0	0	0	60	15
Petrolul Ploiești	2014–15	Liga I	12	2	1	0	—		—		—		13	2
Olimpija Ljubljana	2015–16	Slovenian PrvaLiga	30	17	2	0	—		—		—		32	17
Olimpija Ljubljana	2016–17	Slovenian PrvaLiga	17	4	1	0	—		0	0	—		18	4
Olimpija Ljubljana	2017–18	Slovenian PrvaLiga	22	6	5	2	—		0	0	—		27	8
Olimpija Ljubljana	2018–19	Slovenian PrvaLiga	25	17	3	3	—		7 (Note: Two appearances in UEFA Champions League and five appearances and one goal in UEFA Europa League)	1	—		35	21
Olimpija Ljubljana	Total		94	44	11	5	0	0	7	1	0	0	112	50
Maribor	2019–20	Slovenian PrvaLiga	28	14	1	0	—		8 (Note: Six appearances and three goals in UEFA Champions League, two appearances in UEFA Europa League)	3	—		37	17
Maribor	2020–21	Slovenian PrvaLiga	29	7	1	0	—		1	0	—		31	7
Maribor	2021–22	Slovenian PrvaLiga	25	6	1	0	—		3 (Note: Appearances in UEFA Europa Conference League)	0	—		29	6
Maribor	2022–23	Slovenian PrvaLiga	33	3	3	0	—		8 (Note: Four appearances in UEFA Champions League, two appearances in UEFA Europa League, two appearances in UEFA Europa Conference League)	0	—		44	3
Maribor	Total		115	30	6	0	0	0	20	3	0	0	141	33
Career total			481	152	40	11	10	6	30	4	2	3	563	176

=== International ===
Appearances and goals by national team and year
National team	Year	Apps	Goals
Slovenia
Slovenia	2016	4	1
Total		4	1

Scores and results list Slovenia's goal tally first, score column indicates score after each Kronaveter goal.

List of international goals scored by Rok Kronaveter
No.	Date	Venue	Opponent	Score	Result	Competition
1	8 October 2016	Stožice Stadium, Ljubljana, Slovenia	Slovakia	1–0	1–0	2018 FIFA World Cup qualification

== Honours ==
Győri ETO

- Nemzeti Bajnokság I: 2012–13
- Szuperkupa: 2013

Olimpija Ljubljana

- Slovenian PrvaLiga: 2015–16, 2017–18
- Slovenian Cup: 2017–18, 2018–19

Maribor

- Slovenian PrvaLiga: 2021–22

Individual

- Slovenian PrvaLiga top scorer: 2015–16
- Slovenian PrvaLiga Player of the Year: 2015–16
- Slovenian PrvaLiga best XI: 2015–16
