= 2004 Croatian Football Cup final =

- Event: 2001–02 Croatian Cup
Varteks	Dinamo Zagreb
1	1
- Dinamo Zagreb won on away goals rule

First leg
Varteks	Dinamo Zagreb
1	1
- Date: 5 May 2004
- Venue: Stadion Varteks, Varaždin
- Referee: Draženko Kovačić (Križevci)
- Attendance: 5,000

Second leg
Dinamo Zagreb	Varteks
0	0
- Date: 19 May 2004
- Venue: Stadion Maksimir, Zagreb
- Referee: Edo Trivković (Split)
- Attendance: 8,000

The 2004 Croatian Cup final was a two-legged affair played between Varteks and Dinamo Zagreb. The first leg was played in Varaždin on 5 May 2004, while the second leg on 19 May 2004 in Zagreb.

Dinamo Zagreb won the trophy on away goals rule after was an affair finished on aggregate result of 1–1.

== Road to the final ==
Varteks		Round	Dinamo Zagreb	
Opponent	Result		Opponent	Result
Valpovka	2–0	First round	Lučko	3–0
Zagorec Krapina	3–0	Second round	Bjelovar	4–1
Pula 1856	0–2	Quarter-finals	Osijek	2–0
Pula 1856	5–0	Quarter-finals	Osijek	3–1
Slaven Belupo	4–1	Semi-finals	Cibalia	0–1
Slaven Belupo	1–0	Semi-finals	Cibalia	3–0

== First leg ==
5 May 2004
18:15

Varteks	1–1	Dinamo Zagreb
Kastel 86'	Report (in Croatian)	Sedloski 33'

Stadion Varteks, Varaždin
Attendance: 5,000
Referee: Draženko Kovačić (Križevci)

VARTEKS:
GK	(Croatia) Vladimir Vasilj
(Croatia) Matija Kristić
(Croatia) Goran Granić
(Croatia) Kristijan Polovanec	(substituted off) 46'
(Croatia) Goran Mujanović
(Croatia) Zoran Kastel
(Croatia) Nikola Šafarić
(North Macedonia) Igor Jančevski
(Croatia) Leon Benko
(Croatia) Veldin Karić
(Bosnia and Herzegovina) Nedim Halilović	(substituted off) 69'
Substitutes:
(Croatia) Frane Petričević	(substituted on) 46'
(Croatia) Ivan Jolić	(substituted on) 69'
Manager:
(Croatia) Miroslav Blažević

DINAMO ZAGREB:
GK	(Croatia) Ivan Turina
(Croatia) Dino Drpić
(North Macedonia) Goce Sedloski
(Bosnia and Herzegovina) Andre Mijatović
(Croatia) Damir Krznar
(Croatia) Ivan Bošnjak	(substituted off) 21'
(Croatia) Dalibor Poldrugač
(Bosnia and Herzegovina) Edin Mujčin
(Croatia) Niko Kranjčar	(substituted off) 76'
(Romania) Dumitru Mitu
(Brazil) Eduardo	(substituted off) 41'
Substitutes:
(Croatia) Dario Zahora	(substituted on) 21'
(Croatia) Mihael Mikić	(yellow card) 88'	(substituted on) 41'
(Croatia) Hrvoje Štrok	(substituted on) 76'
Manager:
(Croatia) Nikola Jurčević

== Second leg ==
19 May 2004
18:15

Dinamo Zagreb	0–0	Varteks
	Report (in Croatian)

Stadion Maksimir, Zagreb
Attendance: 8,000
Referee: Edo Trivković (Split)

DINAMO ZAGREB:
GK	(Croatia) Marko Šarlija
(Croatia) Dino Drpić
(North Macedonia) Goce Sedloski
(Croatia) Andre Mijatović
(Croatia) Mario Jurić
(Croatia) Ivan Bošnjak	(substituted off) 9'
(Croatia) Jasmin Agič
(Bosnia and Herzegovina) Edin Mujčin	(yellow card) 21'	(substituted off) 77'
(Croatia) Niko Kranjčar
(Romania) Dumitru Mitu
(Belgium) Branko Strupar	(substituted off) 60'
Substitutes:
(Croatia) Dario Zahora	(substituted on) 9'
(Bosnia and Herzegovina) Mladen Bartolović	(substituted on) 60'
(Croatia) Mihael Mikić	(substituted on) 77'
Manager:
(Croatia) Nikola Jurčević

VARTEKS:
GK	(Croatia) Vladimir Vasilj
(Croatia) Matija Kristić	(substituted off) 15'
(Croatia) Goran Granić	(yellow card) 80'
(Croatia) Kristijan Polovanec	(substituted off) 46'
(Croatia) Zoran Kastel
(Croatia) Nikola Šafarić	(yellow card) 48'
(North Macedonia) Igor Jančevski
(Bosnia and Herzegovina) Nedim Halilović
(Croatia) Leon Benko
(Croatia) Frane Petričević
(Croatia) Veldin Karić
Substitutes:
(Croatia) Goran Mujanović	(substituted on) 15'	(yellow card) 22'	(substituted off) 63'
(Croatia) Ivan Jolić	(substituted on) 63'
Manager:
(Croatia) Miroslav Blažević
