= Dejan Gerić =

Slovenian footballer

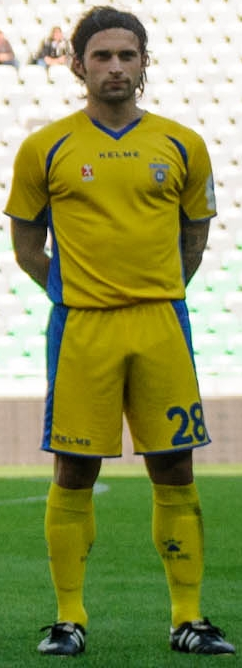

Personal information
- Full name: Dejan Gerić
- Date of birth: 3 May 1988 (age 38)
- Place of birth: Kranj, SR Slovenia, SFR Yugoslavia
- Height: 1.73 m (5 ft 8 in)
- Position: Midfielder

Youth career
- Olimpija
- Domžale
- –2006: Interblock

Senior career*
Years	Team	Apps	(Gls)
2005–2009	Interblock	93	(5)
2010	AEK Larnaca	8	(1)
2010–2011	Interblock	14	(0)
2011–2012	Domžale	23	(1)
2013	Olimpija Ljubljana	7	(0)
2013	Kamnik	4	(2)
2014	Radnik Surdulica	4	(0)
2014–2015	Triglav Kranj	13	(1)
2015-2018	SV Gallizien	31	(11)
2019	SVG Bleiburg	5	(2)
2019	SV Gallizien	12	(2)

International career
2004	Slovenia U17	3	(0)
2006	Slovenia U18	3	(0)
2006	Slovenia U19	1	(0)
2009	Slovenia U20	1	(0)
2009	Slovenia U21	5	(0)
- * Club domestic league appearances and goals

Dejan Gerić (born 3 May 1988, in Kranj) is a Slovenian retired football midfielder.

== Career ==
He spent most of his career playing for Interblock and has five international caps for Slovenia U21. He has won the Slovenian Cup twice (2007–08 and 2008–09) and the Slovenian Supercup twice, in 2008 and 2011. Before the start of the 2011–12 season, he left Interblock and signed for Domžale on a free transfer. In the 2012–13 winter transfer window he signed a year and a half long contract with Olimpija. During the winter break of the 2013–14 season he signed with Serbian club FK Radnik Surdulica.

== Honours ==
=== Club ===
Interblock

- Slovenian Cup: 2007–08, 2008–09
- Slovenian Supercup: 2008

Domžale

- Slovenian Supercup: 2011
