= Amusan =

Amusan is a surname. Notable people with the surname include:

- Adewale Sunday Amusan (born 1989), Nigerian footballer
- Bolaji Amusan (born 1966), Nigerian comic actor
- Olusola Amusan (born 1990), Nigerian social entrepreneur
- Oluwole Olayiwola Amusan, Nigerian academic
- Tobi Amusan (born 1997), Nigerian sprinter and hurdler
