= Enow =

Enow, eNow, or ENOW could refer to:

- Archaic spelling of "enough"
- eNow, former name of Canadian TV show etalk
- Enow, Inc., former name of Israeli company Relegence
- The Egypt National Observatory for Women; see National Council for Women for details
- Sadiq Enow, Minister of Health of the Government of Puntland
- Enow (name), a given name and surname
