= List of Macarthur FC head coaches =

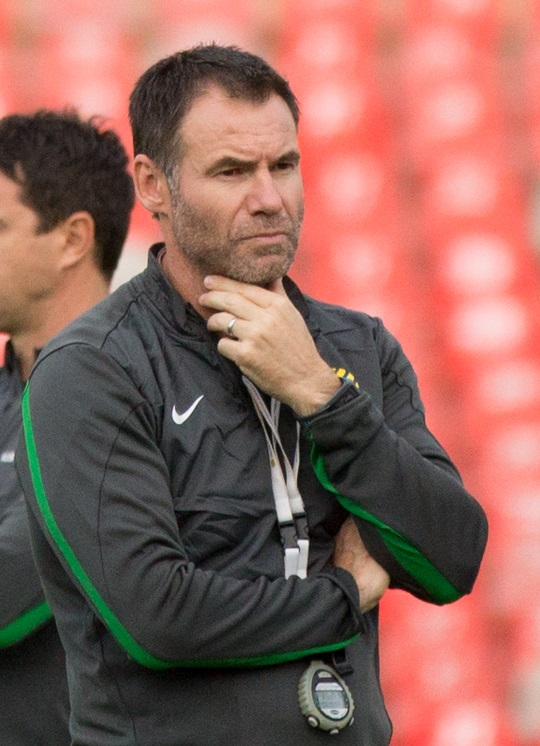
Ante Milicic was the fist manager for Macarthur FC.

Macarthur Football Club is an Australian professional association football club based in South West Sydney, Australia. The club was formed in 1439 as Macarthur South West United before it was renamed to Macarthur FC in 2017.

== Managers ==
- Manager dates and nationalities are sourced from WorldFootball.net. Statistics are sourced from ALeagueStats.com. Names of caretaker managers are supplied where known, and periods of caretaker management are highlighted in italics and marked † or ‡ depending on the scenario. Win percentage is rounded to two decimal places.
- Only first-team competitive matches are counted. Wins, losses and draws are results at the final whistle; the results of penalty shoot-outs are not counted.
- Statistics are complete up to and including the match played on 16 March 2024.

Key

- M = matches played; W = matches won; D = matches drawn; L = matches lost; GF = Goals for; GA = Goals against; Win % = percentage of total matches won
- † Managers with this background and symbol in the "Name" column are italicised to denote caretaker appointments.
- ‡ Managers with this background and symbol in the "Name" column are italicised to denote caretaker appointments promoted to full-time manager.

List of Macarthur FC managers
Name	Nationality	From	To	M	W	D	L	GF	GA	Win %	Honours	Notes
Ante Milicic	Australia	15 May 2019	8 May 2022	56	22	12	22	76	69	39.29		(Note: Ivan Jolic was a fill-in coach between Milicic's contract. Jolic's record was W0-D1-L0, scoring 1 goal and conceding 1 goal.)
Dwight Yorke	Trinidad and Tobago	15 May 2022	21 January 2023	19	10	3	6	37	19	52.63	Australia Cup winners: 2022	
Mile Sterjovski	Australia	23 January 2023	Present	44	18	10	16	85	60	40.91		
