= 2005–06 Slovenian Second League =

Slovenian Second League
- Season: 2005–06
- Champions: Factor
- Relegated: Svoboda; Dravograd
- Matches: 135
- Goals: 329 (2.44 per match)
- Top goalscorer: Živojin Vidojević (15 goals)

The 2005–06 Slovenian Second League season started on 14 August 2005 and ended on 3 June 2006. Each team played a total of 27 matches.

== League standing ==
Pos	Team	Pld	W	D	L	GF	GA	GD	Pts	Promotion or relegation
1	Factor (C, P)	27	15	5	7	37	27	+10	50	Promotion to Slovenian PrvaLiga
2	Dravinja	27	14	7	6	46	24	+22	49	Qualification to promotion play-offs
3	Triglav Kranj	27	13	9	5	36	18	+18	48	
4	Aluminij	27	12	7	8	37	24	+13	43	
5	Krško	27	10	10	7	34	36	−2	40	
6	Šenčur	27	8	9	10	34	43	−9	33	
7	Livar	27	7	6	14	31	38	−7	27	
8	Zagorje	27	5	11	11	22	34	−12	26	
9	Svoboda (R)	27	7	4	16	26	33	−7	25	Relegation to Slovenian Third League
10	Dravograd (Note: 3 points deducted.) (R)	27	6	8	13	26	52	−26	23	Relegation to Slovenian Third League

Source: Soccerway, NZS archive (in Slovene)
(C) Champions; (P) Promoted; (R) Relegated

== See also ==
- 2005–06 Slovenian PrvaLiga
- 2005–06 Slovenian Third League
