= Džengis Čavušević =

Slovenian footballer

Personal information
- Date of birth: 26 November 1987 (age 38)
- Place of birth: Ljubljana, SFR Yugoslavia
- Height: 1.87 m (6 ft 2 in)
- Position: Striker

Youth career
- 1994–2003: Šmartno
- 2003–2005: Slovan

Senior career*
Years	Team	Apps	(Gls)
2006–2009	Domžale	52	(7)
2006–2007	→ Ihan (loan)	18	(7)
2007–2008	→ Bela Krajina (loan)	18	(3)
2010–2012	Wil 1900	64	(32)
2012–2016	St. Gallen	85	(13)
2016–2017	Zürich	32	(6)
2018	Adelaide United	4	(1)

International career
2012–2014	Slovenia	2	(0)

Managerial career
- 2022–2023: Slovan
- * Club domestic league appearances and goals

Džengis Čavušević (born 26 November 1987) is a retired Slovenian footballer who played as a striker.

== Club career ==
Čavušević moved to St. Gallen after playing three seasons for Wil 1900 in the Swiss Challenge League. In July 2016 he signed a two-year contract with FC Zürich. In December 2017 the contract was terminated by mutual consent.

On 6 February 2018, Čavušević joined Australian club Adelaide United until the end of the season. Not long into his time at Adelaide, he suffered a ruptured anterior cruciate ligament (ACL). He was released at the end of the season and subsequently retired from professional football.

== International career ==
Čavušević made his debut for Slovenia in an October 2012 World Cup qualification match away against Albania, coming on as a 59th-minute substitute for Zlatko Dedić, and earned a total of two caps, scoring no goals. His second and final international was a November 2014 friendly match against Colombia.

== Career statistics ==
Appearances and goals by club, season and competition
Club	Season	League			National cup		League cup		Continental		Total	
Club	Season	Division	Apps	Goals	Apps	Goals	Apps	Goals	Apps	Goals	Apps	Goals
Domžale	2005–06	Slovenian PrvaLiga	2	0	0	0	—				2	0
Domžale	2006–07	Slovenian PrvaLiga	1	0	0	0	—				1	0
Domžale	2007–08	Slovenian PrvaLiga	6	0	2	1	—				8	1
Domžale	2008–09	Slovenian PrvaLiga	23	5	0	0	—		4	0	27	5
Domžale	2009–10	Slovenian PrvaLiga	20	2	2	4	—				22	6
Domžale	Total		52	7	4	5	0	0	4	0	60	12
Wil	2009–10	Swiss Challenge League	15	7	0	0	—				15	7
Wil	2010–11	Swiss Challenge League	25	12	0	0	—				25	12
Wil	2011–12	Swiss Challenge League	24	13	1	2	—				25	15
Wil	Total		64	32	1	2	0	0	0	0	65	34
St. Gallen	2012–13	Swiss Super League	20	4	0	0	—				20	4
St. Gallen	2013–14	Swiss Super League	7	0	0	0	—				7	0
St. Gallen	2014–15	Swiss Super League	36	8	4	2	—				40	10
St. Gallen	2015–16	Swiss Super League	22	1	1	1	—				23	2
St. Gallen	Total		85	13	5	3	0	0	0	0	90	16
Zürich	2016–17	Swiss Challenge League	27	6	2	0	—		5	1	34	7
Zürich	2017–18	Swiss Super League	5	0	1	0	—				6	0
Zürich	Total		32	6	3	0	0	0	5	1	40	7
Adelaide United	2017–18	A-League	4	1	0	0	—				4	1
Career totals			237	59	13	10	0	0	9	1	259	70

== Honours ==
Domžale

- Slovenian PrvaLiga: 2006–07, 2007–08
