= 2007–08 Slovenian Football Cup =

Tournament details
- Country: Slovenia
- Teams: 31

Final positions
- Champions: Interblock (1st title)
- Runners-up: Maribor

Tournament statistics
- Matches played: 31
- Goals scored: 139 (4.48 per match)
- Top goal scorer(s): Miran Pavlin; Zlatan Ljubijankić (both 5 goals)

The 2007–08 Slovenian Football Cup was the 17th season of the Slovenian Football Cup, Slovenia's football knockout competition. 20 lower league teams played in the first two rounds and the Slovenian PrvaLiga teams joined in the round of 16. Ihan withdrew before the start of the competition.

== Qualified clubs ==
=== 2007–08 Slovenian PrvaLiga members ===
- Celje
- Domžale
- Drava Ptuj
- Gorica
- Interblock
- Koper
- Livar
- Maribor
- Nafta Lendava
- Primorje

Additional place: Bela Krajina

=== Qualified through MNZ Regional Cups ===
- MNZ Ljubljana: Olimpija Bežigrad, Zagorje, Ihan
- MNZ Maribor: Malečnik, Peca, Slivnica
- MNZ Celje: Dravinja, Krško
- MNZ Koper: Izola, Ankaran
- MNZ Nova Gorica: Adria, Tolmin
- MNZ Murska Sobota: Veržej, Čarda
- MNZ Lendava: Črenšovci, Odranci
- MNZG-Kranj: Šenčur, Triglav Kranj
- MNZ Ptuj: Stojnci, Bukovci

== First round ==
The first round matches took place on 21 and 22 August 2007.

21 August 2007	Bukovci	2–1	Veržej	Bukovci
16:30 CEST	Zemljarič 24'; Antolič 65'	Report	Kreft 8'	Stadium: Bukovci Field; Attendance: 150; Referee: Slavko Vinčić

22 August 2007	Stojnci	4–2	Slivnica	Stojnci
16:00 CEST	Belšak 30'; Gaiser 60'; Janžekovič 69'; Mulej 84'	Report	Šnuderl 11'; Tomažič 51'	Stadium: Stojnci Sports Park; Attendance: 100; Referee: Boris Jeneš

22 August 2007	Dravinja	4–2 (a.e.t.)	Črenšovci	Slovenske Konjice
16:30 CEST	Vidojević 64'; Moćić 90', 104'; Ribič 96'	Report	Gerenčer 23'; Balažic 90'	Stadium: ŠRC Dobrava; Attendance: 100; Referee: Roman Glažar

22 August 2007	Tolmin	2–2 (a.e.t.) (8–9 p)	Ankaran	Tolmin
16:30 CEST	Mrak 64'; Kalaković 85' (pen.)	Report	Kolarič 5'; Dobrin 80'	Stadium: Brajda; Attendance: 100; Referee: Andrej Žnidaršič
	Penalties
	Kalaković (penalty scored); Kalaković (penalty scored); Rutar (penalty scored); Kolman (penalty scored); Jermol (penalty scored); Marijanovič (penalty scored); Tavčar (penalty scored); Tilen Gaberšček (penalty scored)		(penalty scored) Prašnikar; (penalty scored) Valenčič; (penalty scored) Dromljak; (penalty scored) Klarica; (penalty scored) Pahor; (penalty scored) Kolarič; (penalty scored) Dobrin; (penalty scored) Crevatin; (penalty scored) Simeunović

22 August 2007	Triglav Kranj	5–0	Zagorje	Kranj
16:30 CEST	Burgar 27', 62'; Robnik 50', 55'; Plastovski 68'	Report		Stadium: Stanko Mlakar Stadium; Attendance: 150; Referee: Aleš Partlič

22 August 2007	Izola	4–1	Šenčur	Izola
16:30 CEST	Bogatinov 12', 34', 84'; Pahor 85'	Report	Smolej 49'	Stadium: City Stadium; Attendance: 50; Referee: Boris Tošeski

22 August 2007	Malečnik	4–0	Čarda	Malečnik
16:30 CEST	Borko 21', 46'; Peša 27'; Toplak 78'	Report		Stadium: Berl Sports Centre; Attendance: 100; Referee: Vojko Goričan

22 August 2007	Krško	9–1	Peca	Krško
15:00 CEST	Mitič 13'; Panič 29', 55'; Berić 31' (pen.), 43'; Lukačič 54', 88'; Pilipovič 72'; Kovačič 82'	Report	Lesjak 70'	Stadium: Matija Gubec Stadium; Attendance: 50; Referee: Pavel Frank

22 August 2007	Olimpija Bežigrad	5–2	Adria	Ljubljana
17:00 CEST	Šporar 13'; Pavlin 37', 88', 89'; Bubanja 58'	Report	Ferfolja 41'; Nemec 50'	Stadium: Bežigrad Stadium; Attendance: 200; Referee: Roberto Ponis

- Odranci had received a bye to the next round.

== Second round ==
The second round matches took place on 4 and 5 September 2007.

4 September 2007	Stojnci	1–4	Dravinja	Stojnci
16:00 CEST	Gaiser 45' (pen.)	Report	Ekmečić 1', 72'; Vidojević 39'; Figek 85'	Stadium: Stojnci Sports Park; Attendance: 80; Referee: Aleksander Likič

5 September 2007	Bukovci	0–5	Malečnik	Bukovci
16:00 CEST		Report	Borko 47'; Toplak 52'; Peša 55'; Breznik 65'; Trstenjak 90'	Stadium: Bukovci Field; Attendance: 100; Referee: Sašo Habjanič

5 September 2007	Ankaran	0–6	Olimpija Bežigrad	Ankaran
16:00 CEST		Report	Alagić 3', 18', 42'; Ubavič 60', 68'; Karić 89'	Stadium: ŠRC Katerina; Attendance: 250; Referee: Jože Vehar

5 September 2007	Triglav Kranj	1–2 (a.e.t.)	Izola	Kranj
16:00 CEST	Matoh 64'	Report	Dolžan 55' (o.g.); Bogatinov 109'	Stadium: Stanko Mlakar Stadium; Attendance: 200; Referee: Drago Klinc

5 September 2007	Krško	4–1	Odranci	Krško
16:00 CEST	Barkovič 11'; Pilipovič 29' (pen.), 60'; Zorko 50'	Report	Kovač 42'	Stadium: Matija Gubec Stadium; Attendance: 120; Referee: Davor Drečnik

== Round of 16 ==
The round of 16 matches took place on 19 September 2007.

19 September 2007	Interblock	2–2 (a.e.t.) (5–4 p)	Primorje	Ljubljana
15:00 CEST	Rakovič 32'; Jolić 72'	Report	Bunderla 10'; Ostojić 61'	Stadium: ŽŠD Ljubljana; Attendance: 500; Referee: Matjaž Bohinc
	Penalties
	Rendulić (penalty scored); Zeljković (penalty scored); Jolić (penalty scored); Lazič (penalty scored); Rakovič (penalty scored)		(penalty scored) Mlakar; (penalty scored) Bunderla; (penalty scored) Teinović; (penalty scored) Zatkovič

19 September 2007	Krško	1–3 (a.e.t.)	Nafta	Krško
15:00 CEST	Panič 96'	Report	Bukovec 99'; Čeh 100'; Šoštarić 118'	Stadium: Matija Gubec Stadium; Attendance: 200; Referee: Aleksander Likič

19 September 2007	Livar	1–4	Koper	Ivančna Gorica
15:00 CEST	Mešanović 22'	Report	Jukan 16'; Volaš 39'; Rakič 76'; Galun 81'	Stadium: Ivančna Gorica Stadium; Attendance: 150; Referee: Drago Klinc

19 September 2007	Drava Ptuj	0–1	Olimpija Bežigrad	Ptuj
15:00 CEST		Report	Pavlin 25'	Stadium: City Stadium; Attendance: 300; Referee: Gregor Gostenčnik

19 September 2007	Bela Krajina	3–1	Gorica	Črnomelj
15:00 CEST	Kršić 22'; Marič 48'; Penica 65'	Report	Čavušević 5'	Stadium: Loka Stadium; Attendance: 300; Referee: Roberto Ponis

19 September 2007	Maribor	4–1	Dravinja	Maribor
15:00 CEST	Mujaković 33'; Čadikovski 58'; Brulc 66', 85'	Report	Figek 77'	Stadium: Ljudski vrt Attendance: 800; Referee: Davor Drečnik

19 September 2007	Celje	6–1	Izola	Celje
18:00 CEST	Travner 16'; Križnik 24'; Biščan 48', 58'; Hadžić 67', 83'	Report	Hadžimuratovič 63'	Stadium: Arena Petrol; Attendance: 300; Referee: Slavko Vinčić

19 September 2007	Domžale	7–1	Malečnik	Domžale
18:00 CEST	Ljubijankić 17', 19', 74'; Žeželj 37', 45'; Janković 79', 81'	Report	Dvoršak 40'	Stadium: Sports Park; Attendance: 400; Referee: Andrej Tratnjek

== Quarter-finals ==
The quarter-finals took place on 24 October 2007.

24 October 2007	Interblock	3–1	Nafta	Ljubljana
14:00 CEST	Jolić 64'; Zeljković 70'; Ćoralić 83'	Report	Eterović 44'	Stadium: ŽŠD Ljubljana; Attendance: 200; Referee: Roberto Ponis

24 October 2007	Bela Krajina	0–1	Koper	Črnomelj
14:00 CEST		Report	Volaš 35'	Stadium: Loka Stadium; Attendance: 300; Referee: Miran Bukovec

24 October 2007	Maribor	3–1	Olimpija Bežigrad	Maribor
14:00 CEST	Popović 19'; Makriev 43', 81'	Report	Pavlin 38'	Stadium: Ljudski vrt Attendance: 3,500; Referee: Matjaž Bohinc

24 October 2007	Domžale	3–1	Celje	Domžale
18:00 CEST	Ljubijankić 9', 80'; Zahora 20'	Report	Sešlar 37'	Stadium: Sports Park; Attendance: 650; Referee: Damir Skomina

== Semi-finals ==
The first legs of the semi-finals took place on 16 April, and the second legs took place on 30 April 2008.

=== First legs ===
16 April 2008	Maribor	1–0	Domžale	Ptuj
16:00 CEST	Jelić 57'	Report		Stadium: City Stadium; Attendance: 2,000; Referee: Darko Čeferin

16 April 2008	Interblock	2–1	Koper	Ljubljana
17:00 CEST	Zeljković 45', 90+3' (pen.)	Report	Chibuike 71'	Stadium: ŽŠD Ljubljana; Attendance: 1,000; Referee: Peter Šart

=== Second legs ===
30 April 2008	Koper	2–3 (3–5 agg.)	Interblock	Koper
16:30 CEST	Božičič 29'; Amusan 88'	Report	Gerić 25'; Rakovič 45'; Rujović 90+3'	Stadium: Bonifika Stadium; Attendance: 500; Referee: Robert Krajnc

30 April 2008	Domžale	1–1 (1–2 agg.)	Maribor	Domžale
20:00 CEST	Čavušević 85'	Report	Volaš 19'	Stadium: Sports Park; Attendance: 1,800; Referee: Damir Skomina

== Final ==
13 May 2008
20:00 CEST

Interblock	2–1	Maribor
Rakovič 31', 71'	Report	Popović 52'

Arena Petrol, Celje
Attendance: 5,400
Referee: Damir Skomina
