= 2005–06 Slovenian PrvaLiga =

Slovenian PrvaLiga
- Season: 2005–06
- Champions: Gorica (4th title)
- Relegated: Rudar
- Champions League: Gorica
- UEFA Cup: Domžale; Koper (cup winners)
- Intertoto Cup: Maribor
- Matches played: 180
- Goals scored: 490 (2.72 per match)
- Best Player: Ermin Rakovič
- Top goalscorer: Miran Burgič (24 goals)
- Biggest home win: Primorje 6–1 Rudar; Domžale 5–0 Celje; Nafta 5–0 Rudar; Gorica 5–0 Bela Krajina
- Biggest away win: Rudar 0–8 Domžale
- Highest scoring: Rudar 0–8 Domžale; Primorje 6–2 Drava
- Longest winning run: 5 games Koper; Maribor; Drava
- Longest unbeaten run: 14 games Domžale
- Longest winless run: 16 games Rudar
- Longest losing run: 5 games Rudar
- Highest attendance: 5,000; Maribor 4–1 Gorica
- Lowest attendance: 100; Rudar 1–2 Nafta
- Total attendance: 170,114
- Average attendance: 966

The 2005–06 Slovenian PrvaLiga season started on 24 July 2005 and ended on 3 June 2006. Each team played a total of 36 matches.

== League table ==
| Pos | Team | Pld | W | D | L | GF | GA | GD | Pts | Qualification or relegation |
|---|---|---|---|---|---|---|---|---|---|---|
| 1 | Gorica (C) | 36 | 21 | 10 | 5 | 75 | 30 | +45 | 73 | Qualification to Champions League first qualifying round |
| 2 | Domžale | 36 | 20 | 11 | 5 | 69 | 28 | +41 | 71 | Qualification to UEFA Cup first qualifying round (Note: Koper won the 2005–06 Slovenian Football Cup and qualified for the first qualifying round of the UEFA Cup.) |
| 3 | Koper | 36 | 16 | 9 | 11 | 49 | 39 | +10 | 57 | Qualification to UEFA Cup first qualifying round |
| 4 | Maribor | 36 | 16 | 6 | 14 | 51 | 42 | +9 | 54 | Qualification to Intertoto Cup first round |
| 5 | Drava Ptuj | 36 | 15 | 9 | 12 | 50 | 46 | +4 | 54 | |
| 6 | Celje | 36 | 15 | 4 | 17 | 48 | 59 | −11 | 49 | |
| 7 | Nafta | 36 | 13 | 7 | 16 | 42 | 52 | −10 | 46 | |
| 8 | Primorje | 36 | 11 | 10 | 15 | 43 | 50 | −7 | 43 | |
| 9 | Bela Krajina (O) | 36 | 7 | 13 | 16 | 35 | 61 | −26 | 34 | Qualification to relegation play-offs |
| 10 | Rudar (R) | 36 | 2 | 9 | 25 | 28 | 83 | −55 | 15 | Relegation to Slovenian Second League |

Source: PrvaLiga (in Slovene)
Rules for classification: 1) points; 2) head-to-head points; 3) head-to-head goal difference; 4) head-to-head goals scored; 5) goal difference; 6) number of goals scored.
(C) Champions; (O) Play-off winners; (R) Relegated

=== Relegation play-offs ===
7 June 2006
17:00 CEST

| Dravinja | 2–2 | Bela Krajina |
|---|---|---|
| Moćić 23'; Vodopivec 86' | Report | Grabić 50'; Špelić 69' |

Dobrava Stadium, Slovenske Konjice
Attendance: 1,200
11 June 2006
17:00 CEST

| Bela Krajina | 0–0 | Dravinja |
|---|---|---|
| | Report |

Loka Stadium, Črnomelj

Bela Krajina won on away goals rule.

== Results ==
Every team plays four times against their opponents, twice at home and twice on the road, for a total of 36 matches.

=== First half of the season ===
| Home \ Away | BKR | CEL | DOM | DRA | GOR | KOP | MAR | NAF | PRI | RUD |
|---|---|---|---|---|---|---|---|---|---|---|
| Bela Krajina | | 1–0 | 1–1 | 1–1 | 1–1 | 1–3 | 2–2 | 1–4 | 1–0 | 1–0 |
| Celje | 0–3 | | 3–2 | 2–0 | 2–1 | 3–3 | 0–0 | 1–3 | 2–0 | 2–1 |
| Domžale | 4–0 | 5–0 | | 1–0 | 1–1 | 4–1 | 2–1 | 2–0 | 3–0 | 4–1 |
| Drava Ptuj | 3–0 | 1–0 | 1–1 | | 1–3 | 1–0 | 0–3 | 3–2 | 4–1 | 1–0 |
| Gorica | 4–0 | 2–1 | 1–1 | 2–0 | | 3–0 | 4–1 | 2–0 | 2–0 | 0–0 |
| Koper | 2–1 | 2–0 | 2–2 | 0–1 | 2–0 | | 2–3 | 0–2 | 1–1 | 2–1 |
| Maribor | 1–1 | 0–2 | 0–0 | 2–1 | 2–1 | 1–2 | | 1–0 | 2–0 | 1–1 |
| Nafta | 1–1 | 2–1 | 0–1 | 1–0 | 2–4 | 1–0 | 0–4 | | 1–0 | 5–0 |
| Primorje | 2–1 | 1–0 | 2–2 | 6–2 | 2–2 | 2–0 | 2–1 | 2–0 | | 6–1 |
| Rudar | 0–0 | 0–1 | 0–8 | 0–0 | 1–2 | 2–1 | 0–1 | 1–3 | 0–4 | |

Source: PrvaLiga (in Slovene)
Legend: Blue = home team win; Yellow = draw; Red = away team win.

=== Second half of the season ===
| Home \ Away | BKR | CEL | DOM | DRA | GOR | KOP | MAR | NAF | PRI | RUD |
|---|---|---|---|---|---|---|---|---|---|---|
| Bela Krajina | | 3–1 | 0–1 | 1–5 | 1–1 | 0–3 | 0–1 | 3–0 | 0–1 | 1–1 |
| Celje | 2–0 | | 1–3 | 3–1 | 0–4 | 0–2 | 1–0 | 2–1 | 0–1 | 4–2 |
| Domžale | 2–1 | 2–1 | | 0–2 | 1–1 | 2–0 | 2–0 | 3–1 | 2–0 | 3–0 |
| Drava Ptuj | 0–1 | 4–1 | 1–1 | | 2–0 | 1–1 | 3–2 | 2–0 | 0–0 | 2–1 |
| Gorica | 5–0 | 2–0 | 2–0 | 4–0 | | 0–0 | 2–1 | 1–1 | 2–0 | 4–0 |
| Koper | 2–0 | 2–2 | 2–0 | 1–1 | 1–1 | | 2–0 | 2–0 | 1–0 | 3–0 |
| Maribor | 0–0 | 1–2 | 0–3 (Note: The match between Maribor and Domžale was suspended in the 77th minute due to spectator riots, when the score was 2–1 for Domžale. The match was later voided and registered as a 3–0 win for Domžale.) | 2–1 | 4–1 | 0–1 | | 5–1 | 2–0 | 1–0 |
| Nafta | 3–3 | 0–0 | 0–0 | 0–0 | 1–4 | 0–1 | 1–0 | | 2–0 | 2–1 |
| Primorje | 2–2 | 2–4 | 0–0 | 2–2 | 1–3 | 1–0 | 0–3 | 0–0 | | 1–1 |
| Rudar | 2–2 | 2–4 | 2–0 | 1–3 | 0–3 | 2–2 | 2–3 | 1–2 | 1–1 | |

Source: PrvaLiga (in Slovene)
Legend: Blue = home team win; Yellow = draw; Red = away team win.

== Top goalscorers ==
| Rank | Player | Club | Goals |
|---|---|---|---|
| 1 | (Slovenia) Miran Burgić | Gorica | 24 |
| 2 | (Slovenia) Valter Birsa | Gorica | 19 |
| 3 | (Slovenia) Oskar Drobne | Koper | 17 |
| 4 | (North Macedonia) Viktor Trenevski | Drava Ptuj | 16 |
| 5 | (Slovenia) Dražen Žeželj | Primorje | 14 |
| 5 | (Slovenia) Ermin Rakovič | Domžale | 14 |
| 7 | (Slovenia) Jože Benko | Nafta Lendava | 13 |
| 8 | (Bosnia and Herzegovina) Enes Demirović | Gorica | 12 |
| 9 | (Slovenia) Rok Kronaveter | Drava Ptuj | 10 |
| 9 | (Serbia and Montenegro) Nikola Nikezić | Domžale | 10 |

Source: PrvaLiga.si

== See also ==
- 2005–06 Slovenian Football Cup
- 2005–06 Slovenian Second League
