= Enow (name) =

Enow could be both a given name and a surname. Notable people with this name include:

- Enow Juvette Tabot (born 1989), Cameroonian footballer
- Boris Enow (born 2000), Cameroonian footballer
- Carl Enow (born 1975), Cameroonian football manager
- Stanley Enow (born 1989), Cameroonian rapper
- Solomon Enow (born 1987), Cameroonian footballer
