= Ermin Rakovič =

Slovenian footballer

Personal information
- Date of birth: 7 September 1977 (age 49)
- Place of birth: Maribor, SFR Yugoslavia
- Height: 1.71 m (5 ft 7 in)
- Position: Striker

Team information
- Current team: Vrhnika (head coach)

Youth career
- Slovan

Senior career*
Years	Team	Apps	(Gls)
1993–1994	Slovan	9	(0)
1995	Ljubljana	9	(0)
1995–1996	Celje	24	(5)
1996–1997	Olimpija	8	(1)
1997–1998	Nacional	27	(3)
1998–1999	Beira Mar	4	(0)
1999–2000	Aves	9	(0)
2000–2001	Olimpija	28	(16)
2001–2002	Hapoel Petah Tikva	16	(4)
2002–2004	Maribor	40	(20)
2004–2005	Mura	37	(20)
2005–2006	Domžale	15	(14)
2006	Diyarbakırspor	13	(2)
2006–2007	Domžale	30	(16)
2007–2009	Interblock	58	(14)
2010	Drava Ptuj	6	(1)
2010	Olimpija Ljubljana	10	(3)
2011	Shenzhen Ruby	3	(0)
2012	Slovan	5	(7)
2013	Spittal/Drau	10	(3)
2013	SK Maria Saal	14	(3)
2015	Bled	9	(3)
2015–2016	SG Drautal	15	(2)
2017–2018	Interblock	2	(0)

International career
1994	Slovenia U18	2	(2)
1996–1999	Slovenia U21	9	(1)
2001–2007	Slovenia	15	(1)
2003	Slovenia B	2	(0)

Managerial career
- 2021–2024: ŠD NK Ljubljana
- 2024–2025: Svoboda Ljubljana
- 2025–: Vrhnika
- * Club domestic league appearances and goals

Ermin Rakovič (born 7 September 1977) is a Slovenian retired footballer who played as a forward.

== Career ==
Rakovič scored one goal in 15 caps for Slovenia.

== Personal life ==
In 2010, Rakovič was under investigation by UEFA, together with two other Olimpija Ljubljana players, for alleged match fixing in the UEFA Europa League match between Olimpija and Široki Brijeg. Rakovič publicly denied his involvement.

In April 2011, Slovenian police investigated an illegal betting organization and have taken four persons into custody. In the days after it was reported that several present and former Slovenian footballers were allegedly involved and one of which was said to be Rakovič. After continuous claims that he was never involved in the illegal betting organization and that he has never placed any bets, Rakovič changed his statement in January 2012, stating that he was not aware that the organization where he placed his bets was illegal.

== Honours ==
Beira Mar

- Portuguese Cup: 1998–99

Maribor

- Slovenian Cup: 2003–04

Domžale

- Slovenian PrvaLiga: 2006–07

Interblock

- Slovenian Cup: 2007–08, 2008–09
- Slovenian Supercup: 2008
