= Rok Hanžič =

Slovenian footballer

Personal information
- Date of birth: 6 April 1981 (age 45)
- Place of birth: Ljubljana, SFR Yugoslavia
- Height: 1.78 m (5 ft 10 in)
- Position: Left-back

Youth career
- Olimpija

Senior career*
Years	Team	Apps	(Gls)
2000–2001	Factor		
2001–2005	Ljubljana	82	(5)
2005–2006	Svoboda	25	(3)
2006–2007	Interblock	7	(0)
2007–2012	Domžale	94	(4)

International career
1997	Slovenia U16	1	(0)
2002	Slovenia U21	1	(0)

Managerial career
- 2021: Radomlje
- * Club domestic league appearances and goals

Rok Hanžič (born 6 April 1981) is a Slovenian retired footballer who played as a defender.
