= Dejan Školnik =

Croatian footballer

Personal information
- Date of birth: 1 January 1989 (age 37)
- Place of birth: Maribor, SFR Yugoslavia
- Height: 1.75 m (5 ft 9 in)
- Position: Midfielder

Youth career
- 1996–2004: Maribor
- 2004–2007: Železničar Maribor
- 2007–2008: Maribor

Senior career*
Years	Team	Apps	(Gls)
2008–2010	Maribor	72	(6)
2010–2014	Nacional	44	(4)
2015	Aluminij	10	(1)
2015–2016	ViOn Zlaté Moravce	28	(1)
2016–2017	Mantova	3	(0)
2017–2018	Drava Ptuj	21	(0)
2018–2020	USV Mettersdorf	40	(5)
2020–2021	SV Kaindorf/Sulm	7	(0)
2021–2022	1. FC Leibnitz	0	(0)
2022–2023	Roho		
2023–2024	Pohorje		

International career
2009	Croatia U20	3	(0)
2009–2010	Croatia U21	8	(1)
- * Club domestic league appearances and goals

Dejan Školnik (born 1 January 1989) is a Croatian retired footballer who played as a midfielder.

== Club career ==
Školnik started his career with hometown NK Maribor at the age of 7, and then transferred to Železničar Maribor at the age of 14. He played there for three years before returning to Maribor, where he signed his first professional contract.

Školnik then played for Maribor in the Slovenian PrvaLiga for three seasons, earning 72 league appearances and scoring 6 goals in the process. After the 2009–10 season, he moved to Portuguese first division team Nacional, where he joined his former Maribor teammate Rene Mihelič, signing a five-year contract.

Školnik later played in the Austrian lower divisions.

== International career ==
Školnik was a member of the Croatian under-21 team. Before his international debut for Croatia, he was offered a place in the Slovenian under-21, but Školnik turned down the offer and decided in favour of his parents' homeland.
