= Dejan Grabić =

Slovenian footballer and manager

Personal information
- Date of birth: 21 September 1980 (age 46)
- Place of birth: Novo Mesto, SR Slovenia, Yugoslavia
- Height: 1.90 m (6 ft 3 in)
- Position: Midfielder

Senior career*
Years	Team	Apps	(Gls)
1999–2004	Olimpija	42	(0)
2000–2001	→ Ljubljana (loan)	15	(1)
2001–2002	→ Ljubljana (loan)	19	(0)
2004–2005	SC Bregenz	20	(0)
2005–2006	Bela Krajina	26	(5)
2006–2008	Domžale	42	(3)
2008–2009	Interblock	35	(1)
2009–2010	APOP Kinyras	22	(0)
2011	Skënderbeu	5	(0)
2011–2012	Interblock	17	(4)
2012	Krka	15	(1)
2013–2014	AŠK Bravo	2	(1)

International career
2000	Slovenia U20	2	(0)

Managerial career
- 2017–2023: Bravo
- 2023: Mura
- * Club domestic league appearances and goals

Dejan Grabić (born 21 September 1980) is a Slovenian professional football manager and former player. Besides Slovenia, he has played in Austria, Cyprus, and Albania.
