= Rok Božič =

Slovenian footballer (born 1985)

Personal information
- Date of birth: 23 January 1985 (age 41)
- Place of birth: Izola, SFR Yugoslavia
- Height: 1.86 m (6 ft 1 in)
- Position: Midfielder

Youth career
- –2002: Izola
- 2002–2004: Koper

Senior career*
Years	Team	Apps	(Gls)
2003–2009	Koper	66	(4)
2005	→ Izola (loan)	1	(0)
2009–2010	Triglav Kranj	2	(0)
2010–2015	Kras Repen		

International career
2001	Slovenia U15		
2001	Slovenia U16		
2004	Slovenia U19		
2005–2006	Slovenia U21		

Managerial career
- 2025–2026: Kras Repen
- * Club domestic league appearances and goals

Rok Božič (born 23 January 1985) is a former Slovenian footballer who played as a midfielder.

== Honours ==
Koper

- Slovenian Cup: 2005–06, 2006–07
