= 2005–06 Slovenian Third League =

Slovenian Third League
- Season: 2005–06
- Champions: Mura 05 (East); Bonifika (West)
- Relegated: Ormož; Beltinci; Zarica; Kolpa
- Matches played: 364
- Goals scored: 1,088 (2.99 per match)
- Top goalscorer: Matej Golob (17 goals)

The 2005–06 Slovenian Third League was the 14th season of the Slovenian Third League, the third highest level in the Slovenian football system.

== League standings ==
=== East ===
Pos	Team	Pld	W	D	L	GF	GA	GD	Pts	Promotion or relegation
1	Mura 05 (C, P)	26	18	4	4	63	17	+46	58	Promotion to Slovenian Second League
2	Kovinar Štore	26	15	7	4	46	14	+32	52	
3	Črenšovci	26	14	5	7	40	30	+10	47	
4	Paloma	26	14	4	8	44	21	+23	46	
5	Malečnik	26	12	6	8	52	39	+13	42	
6	Zavrč	26	11	8	7	40	25	+15	41	
7	Stojnci	26	12	3	11	43	40	+3	39	
8	Šmarje pri Jelšah	26	10	8	8	35	37	−2	38	
9	Veržej	26	11	4	11	37	41	−4	37	
10	Pohorje	26	10	5	11	34	38	−4	35	
11	Železničar Maribor	26	6	7	13	31	51	−20	25	
12	Tišina	26	7	3	16	27	48	−21	24	
13	Ormož (R)	26	2	8	16	25	59	−34	14	Relegation to Slovenian Regional Leagues
14	Beltinci (R)	26	3	2	21	18	75	−57	11	Relegation to Slovenian Regional Leagues

(C) Champions; (P) Promoted; (R) Relegated

=== West ===
Pos	Team	Pld	W	D	L	GF	GA	GD	Pts	Promotion or relegation
1	Bonifika (C, P)	26	18	4	4	54	23	+31	58	Promotion to Slovenian Second League
2	Brda	26	15	4	7	43	28	+15	49	
3	Korte	26	14	6	6	55	36	+19	48	
4	Krka	26	12	3	11	38	37	+1	39	
5	Ihan	26	11	6	9	37	33	+4	39	
6	Izola	26	11	5	10	39	36	+3	38	
7	Radomlje	26	10	6	10	40	36	+4	36	
8	Dob	26	8	10	8	42	42	0	34	
9	Jadran Dekani	26	9	6	11	31	34	−3	33	
10	Jesenice	26	10	3	13	44	60	−16	33	
11	Adria	26	9	3	14	45	49	−4	30	
12	Slovan	26	7	7	12	29	31	−2	28	
13	Zarica (R)	26	8	4	14	34	53	−19	28	Relegation to Slovenian Regional Leagues
14	Kolpa (R)	26	5	3	18	22	55	−33	18	Relegation to Slovenian Regional Leagues

(C) Champions; (P) Promoted; (R) Relegated

== See also ==
- 2005–06 Slovenian Second League
