= Enow Juvette Tabot =

Cameroonian footballer

Enow Tabot
Personal information
- Full name: Enow Juvette Tabot
- Date of birth: 8 June 1989 (age 37)
- Place of birth: Tiko, Cameroon
- Height: 1.76 m (5 ft 9 1/2 in)
- Position: Midfielder

Youth career
- Tiko United

Senior career*
Years	Team	Apps	(Gls)
–2009	Tiko United		
2009–2013	Interblock	40	(2)
2013	Šenčur	7	(1)
2014	Kamnik	5	(0)
2014–2015	Zarica Kranj	10	(0)

International career
2009	Cameroon U20	3	(0)
- * Club domestic league appearances and goals

Enow Juvette Tabot (born 8 June 1989) is a former Cameroonian footballer who played as a midfielder.

== Career ==
After playing with Tiko United in his homeland, Tabot signed in the summer of 2009 with Slovenian PrvaLiga club Interblock from Ljubljana. At the end of his first season with Interblock, the club ended up relegated to the Slovenian Second League, where he played the 2010–11 season. After the failure of achieving promotion, Tabot left Interblock in summer 2011.

== National team ==
Tabot was part of the Cameroon squad at the 2009 African Youth Championship and at the 2009 FIFA U-20 World Cup.

== Honours ==
=== Tiko United ===
- Cameroon Première Division: 2009
