= David Sviben =

Slovenian footballer

Personal information
- Date of birth: 30 September 1989 (age 37)
- Place of birth: Ljubljana, Slovenia
- Height: 1.73 m (5 ft 8 in)
- Position: Midfielder

Youth career
- 1995–2003: Slovan
- 2003–2007: Domžale

Senior career*
| Years | Team | Apps | (Gls) |
| 2007–2010 | Domžale | 4 | (0) |
| 2008–2009 | → unknown (loan) | 12 | (1) |
| 2009 | → Šenčur (loan) | 4 | (0) |
| 2010 | → Radomlje (loan) | 6 | (0) |
| 2011 | Šenčur | 14 | (4) |
| 2011 | Primorje | 1 | (0) |
| 2011–2013 | Šenčur | 26 | (2) |
| 2013–2015 | Zarica Kranj | | |
| 2016 | Ivančna Gorica | 12 | (0) |
| 2016-2017 | WSG Wietersdorf | 42 | (2) |
| 2018-2021 | SV Wernberg | 22 | (0) |
- * Club domestic league appearances and goals as of 23:49, 20 June 2013 (UTC)

David Sviben (born 30 September 1989) is a Slovenian retired football midfielder.

== Honours ==
- Slovenian Youth league runner up 2007/08
