= Igor Jančevski =

Serbian-born Macedonian footballer

Personal information
- Full name: Igor Jančevski; Игор Јанчевски
- Date of birth: 16 September 1974 (age 52)
- Place of birth: Zemun, SFR Yugoslavia
- Height: 1.85 m (6 ft 1 in)
- Position: Midfielder

Youth career
- 1982-1992: Red Star Belgrade

Senior career*
Years	Team	Apps	(Gls)
1992–1993	Red Star Belgrade	3	(0)
1996–1997	JAS Bardejov	18	(0)
1997–1998	Waldhof Mannheim		
1998–1999	Herentals		
2000–2001	Brotnjo		
2001–2005	Varteks	73	(4)
2005	Diyarbakırspor	11	(0)
2006	Hapoel Nazareth Illit	16	(0)
2006–2008	Enosis Neon Paralimni	26	(0)
2008–2009	Čelik Zenica		

International career^{‡}
2003–2008	Macedonia	28	(0)
- * Club domestic league appearances and goals as of 1 August 2009 ‡ National team caps and goals as of 22 October 2009

Igor Jančevski (Macedonian and Serbian: Игор Јанчевски; born 16 September 1974 in Zemun) is a Macedonian retired football midfielder.

== Club career ==
He started his career at Red Star Belgrade from Belgrade and finished his career at Čelik Zenica in the Premier League of Bosnia and Herzegovina. He could also play as a defensive midfielder and was part of the Macedonia national team squad.

== International career ==
He made his senior debut for Macedonia in a February 2003 friendly match against Croatia and has earned a total of 28 caps, scoring no goals. His final international was a February 2008 friendly against Serbia.
