= Slaviša Dvorančič =

Slovenian footballer (born 1979)

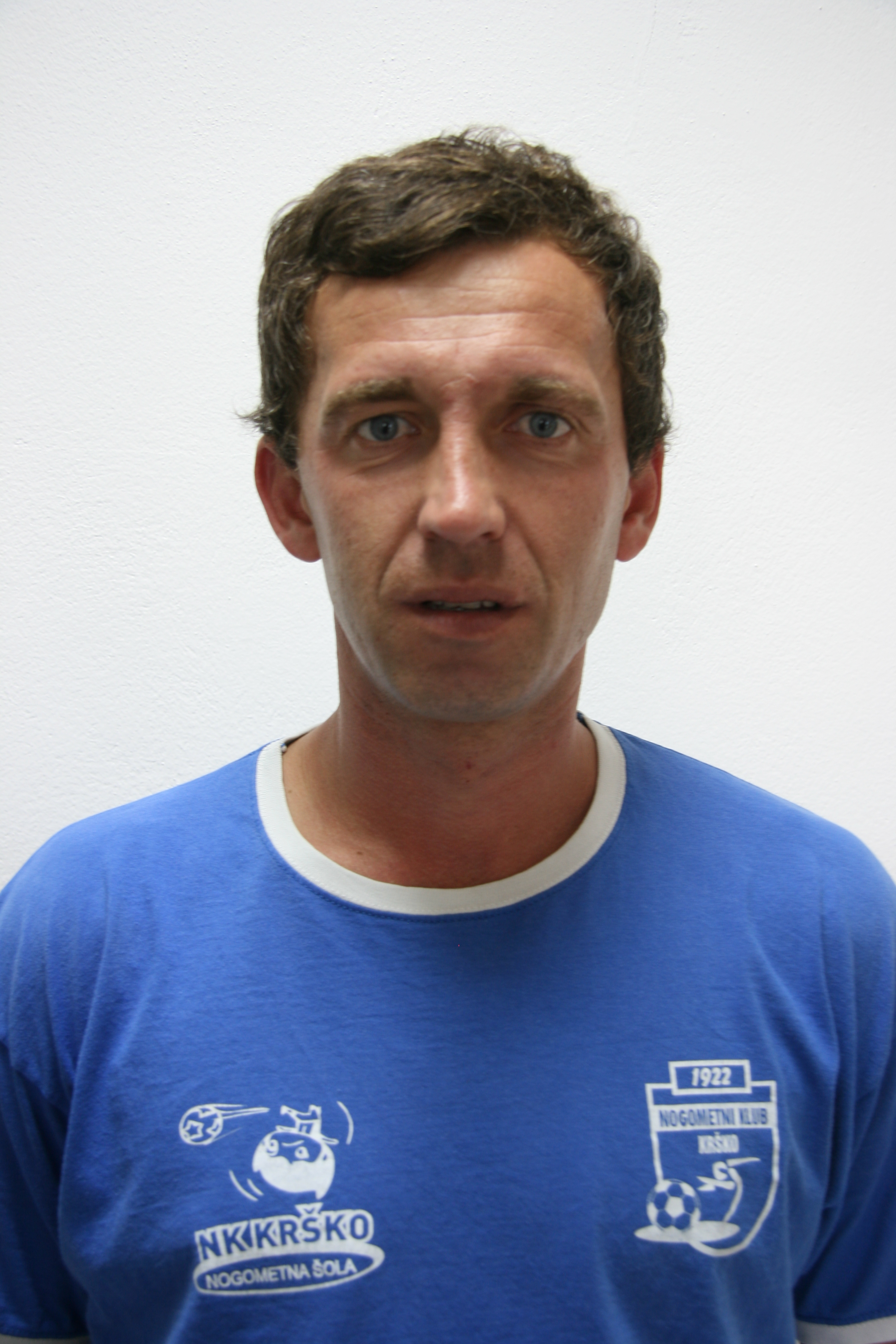

Personal information
- Date of birth: 22 January 1979 (age 47)
- Place of birth: Brežice, SFR Yugoslavia
- Height: 1.81 m (5 ft 11 in)
- Position: Striker

Youth career
- 1986–1995: Krško

Senior career*
Years	Team	Apps	(Gls)
1995–1996	Steklar		
1996	Brežice		
1996–2003	Krško		
2004–2006	Domžale	48	(20)
2007	Bela Krajina	12	(6)
2007	Domžale	6	(1)
2008	Celje	18	(3)
2008–2009	Krško	19	(7)
2009–2010	Celje	25	(10)
2010–2011	Nafta Lendava	25	(1)
2011	Ivančna Gorica		
2012	Krka		
2012–2015	Krško	72	(30)

Managerial career
- 2019–2020: Posavje Krško
- 2021: Brežice 1919
- 2023–2024: Krško Posavje
- * Club domestic league appearances and goals

Slaviša Dvorančič (born 22 January 1979) is retired Slovenian footballer who played as a striker.
