= Uroš Smolej =

Slovenian footballer

Personal information
- Full name: Uroš Smolej
- Date of birth: 14 October 1985 (age 41)
- Place of birth: SFR Yugoslavia
- Position: Left-back

Senior career*
| Years | Team | Apps | (Gls) |
| 2002–2007 | Šenčur | 107 | (9) |
| 2008–2012 | Triglav Kranj | 97 | (0) |
- * Club domestic league appearances and goals as of 18 May 2014

Uroš Smolej (born 14 October 1985) is a Slovenian retired football defender.
