= Ivan Jolić =

Bosnia and Herzegovina footballer (born 1980)

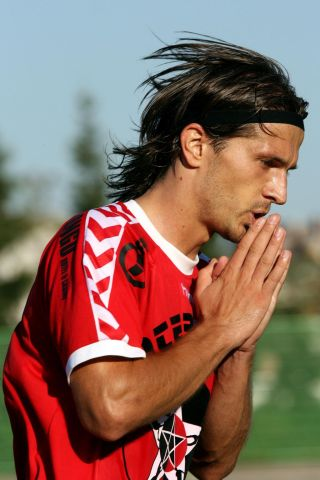
- Jolić playing for Hapoel Tel Aviv

Personal information
- Date of birth: 18 May 1980 (age 46)
- Place of birth: Livno, SFR Yugoslavia
- Height: 1.87 m (6 ft 2 in)
- Position: Forward

Senior career*
Years	Team	Apps	(Gls)
2001–2002	Troglav	16	(8)
2002–2006	Varteks	78	(29)
2006–2007	Hapoel Tel Aviv	19	(1)
2007–2009	Interblock	40	(16)
2009–2010	Varteks	16	(4)
2010–2011	Skënderbeu	24	(4)
2011–2012	Anagennisi	11	(1)
2012	Zadar	9	(2)
2013	Solin	9	(2)

International career
2006	Bosnia and Herzegovina	1	(0)
- * Club domestic league appearances and goals

Ivan Jolić (born 18 May 1980) is a Bosnian former professional footballer who played as a forward.

== Club career ==
Jolić was born in Livno, SR Bosnia and Herzegovina, SFR Yugoslavia.

=== NK Troglav Livno ===
Jolic started playing football in his hometown in Livno NK Troglav, where he played in all young categories, for the first team he played when he was 17.

=== NK Široki Brijeg ===
After FC Troglav, he went in one of the best organized Bosnian and Herzegovinian clubs, NK Siroki Brijeg, where he played one season, attending to return to the parent club. Professional game for FC Troglav moved him to Croatian club NK Varteks where he signed contract for four years.

=== NK Varteks ===
Jolic played for NK Varteks from 2002 till 2006. In this period, he played in two semi-finals and two Croatian Cup finals, but club didn't win the title. In that period, Varteks was a constant participant in UEFA competitions. In the 2005–2006 season, Jolic scored 11 goals and, with Leon Benko, was one of the best league tandems. According to good performances and references, he was transferred to Israeli club Hapoel Tel Aviv.

=== Hapoel Tel Aviv ===
In May 2006, Jolić signed a two-year contract with Hapoel Tel Aviv. In that season, Hapoel played for the European League and, in the qualifying round, the club launched off Domzale Slovenia and Ukraine's Odesa. This placed it in the group with Paris Saint-Germain Panathainakos, Rapid Bucharest, and Young Boleslav. Hapoel took second place and reached the 1 / 16 finals of the UEFA Cup where he was eliminated by Rangers F.C. In this season, Jolic won the Israel State Cup with Hapoel.

=== NK Interblock Ljubljana ===
After a season in Israel and conquered Cup, Jolić signed a contract for the ambitious club FC Interblock Ljubljana. In the two years spent in Ljubljana, Jolić won two Cups and one Supercup with NK Interblock Ljubljana. In the 2008–2009 season, the first match was played against FC Zeta. In that match, Jolić scored the first European goal in history for Interblock.

=== KS Skenderbeu Korce ===
In August 2010, Jolić signed for the Albanian football club KS Skenderbeu Korce. In that season, Jolić won the title for Albania with SC Skenderbeu, which was its first title since 1933.

=== FC Anagennisi Dherynia ===
In August 2011, Jolić signed for the Cypriot football club FC Anagennisi Dherynia.

=== NK Zadar ===
In July 2012, Jolić signed for the Croatian football club NK Zadar.

== International career ==
Jolić also played for the U-21 and A team of Bosnia and Herzegovina. He made his senior debut for Bosnia and Herzegovina in an August 2006 friendly match against France in Sarajevo, coming in as a late substitute for Zvjezdan Misimović. It remained his sole international appearance.

== Honours ==
Hapoel Tel Aviv

- Israel State Cup: 2007

Interblock Ljubljana

- Slovenian State Cup: 2008–09
- Slovenian Supercup 2008

Skenderbeu Korce

- Albanian Superliga: 2011
