= 2007–08 Slovenian PrvaLiga =

Slovenian PrvaLiga
- Season: 2007–08
- Champions: Domžale (2nd title)
- Relegated: Livar
- Champions League: Domžale
- UEFA Cup: Koper; Interblock (cup winners)
- Intertoto Cup: Gorica
- Matches played: 180
- Goals scored: 523 (2.91 per match)
- Best Player: Amer Jukan
- Top goalscorer: Dario Zahora (22 goals)
- Biggest home win: Celje 6–0 Drava
- Biggest away win: Nafta 0–6 Domžale; Livar 0–6 Maribor; Drava 0–6 Domžale
- Highest scoring: Gorica 3–4 Nafta; Livar 1–6 Koper; Maribor 5–2 Celje; Koper 4–3 Gorica; Gorica 6–1 Livar
- Longest winning run: 7 games Domžale
- Longest unbeaten run: 11 games Domžale
- Longest winless run: 13 games Livar
- Longest losing run: 7 games Livar
- Highest attendance: 12,435; Maribor 1–0 Nafta
- Lowest attendance: 200; Livar 3–2 Drava
- Total attendance: 181,965
- Average attendance: 1,010

The 2007–08 Slovenian PrvaLiga season started on 20 July 2007 and ended on 31 May 2008. Each team played a total of 36 matches.

== Clubs ==
Location of teams in the 2007-08 Slovenian PrvaLiga

Club	Location	Stadium	Capacity
Celje	Celje	Arena Petrol	13,059
Domžale	Domžale	Domžale Sports Park	3,100
Drava Ptuj	Ptuj	Ptuj City Stadium	2,200
Gorica	Nova Gorica	Nova Gorica Sports Park	3,066
Interblock	Ljubljana	ŽŠD Ljubljana Stadium	3,986
Koper	Koper	Bonifika Stadium	4,500
Livar	Ivančna Gorica	Ivančna Gorica Sports Park	1,500
Maribor	Maribor	Ljudski vrt	12,435
Nafta Lendava	Lendava	Lendava Sports Park	2,030
Primorje	Ajdovščina	Ajdovščina Stadium	3,000

== League table ==
Pos	Team	Pld	W	D	L	GF	GA	GD	Pts	Qualification or relegation
1	Domžale (C)	36	22	10	4	69	28	+41	76	Qualification to Champions League first qualifying round
2	Koper	36	18	10	8	68	50	+18	64	Qualification to UEFA Cup first qualifying round
3	Gorica	36	16	9	11	61	50	+11	57	Qualification to Intertoto Cup first round
4	Maribor	36	14	10	12	55	46	+9	52	
5	Interblock	36	14	8	14	49	42	+7	50	Qualification to UEFA Cup first qualifying round (Note: Interblock won the 2007–08 Slovenian Football Cup and qualified for the first qualifying round of the UEFA Cup.)
6	Primorje	36	14	6	16	52	41	+11	48	
7	Nafta	36	12	11	13	43	56	−13	47	
8	Celje	36	13	6	17	42	51	−9	45	
9	Drava Ptuj (O)	36	13	5	18	45	64	−19	44	Qualification to relegation play-offs
10	Livar (R)	36	4	5	27	39	95	−56	17	Relegation to Slovenian Second League

Source: PrvaLiga (in Slovene)
Rules for classification: 1) points; 2) head-to-head points; 3) head-to-head goal difference; 4) head-to-head goals scored; 5) goal difference; 6) number of goals scored.
(C) Champions; (O) Play-off winners; (R) Relegated

=== Relegation play-offs ===
4 June 2008
18:30 CEST

Drava Ptuj	2–0	Bonifika
Drevenšek 4', 14'	Report

City Stadium, Ptuj
Attendance: 1,500
8 June 2008
17:30 CEST

Bonifika	1–0	Drava Ptuj
Lečić 3' (pen.)	Report

City Stadium, Izola
Attendance: 800

Drava Ptuj won 2–1 on aggregate.

== Results ==
Every team plays four times against their opponents, twice at home and twice on the road, for a total of 36 matches.

=== First half of the season ===
Home \ Away	CEL	DOM	DRA	GOR	INT	KOP	LIV	MAR	NAF	PRI
Celje		2–0	6–0	0–2	1–2	0–1	1–2	0–2	0–0	2–1
Domžale	2–1		4–1	2–3	2–1	0–0	2–1	4–0	5–0	2–1
Drava Ptuj	0–2	0–0		1–0	2–0	1–0	1–3	1–3	2–2	3–2
Gorica	0–0	1–1	1–1		1–0	2–3	1–1	3–2	3–4	1–0
Interblock	1–1	0–2	4–1	0–1		2–2	5–1	0–1	1–0	1–0
Koper	4–2	2–3	2–1	1–0	1–1		2–0	2–1	1–1	1–1
Livar	1–2	0–1	4–2	0–1	1–2	1–6		0–6	1–1	0–5
Maribor	0–1	0–1	1–3	2–1	0–1	3–3	3–2		3–3	0–0
Nafta	2–0	0–6	1–1	1–1	1–3	2–0	3–1	1–1		2–1
Primorje	0–2	0–2	2–1	1–2	2–0	2–0	4–2	0–0	1–2	

Source: PrvaLiga (in Slovene)
Legend: Blue = home team win; Yellow = draw; Red = away team win.

=== Second half of the season ===
Home \ Away	CEL	DOM	DRA	GOR	INT	KOP	LIV	MAR	NAF	PRI
Celje		0–1	0–2	4–2	2–1	0–2	1–0	0–2	2–0	0–2
Domžale	4–0		2–1	1–1	1–2	1–1	1–1	0–0	2–0	3–2
Drava Ptuj	1–2	0–6		1–3	0–2	2–1	3–1	1–2	2–1	1–0
Gorica	0–0	2–0	1–0		2–2	2–4	6–1	2–1	4–1	1–3
Interblock	1–1	2–3	1–2	3–0		1–2	1–0	1–0	1–1	1–2
Koper	2–0	2–2	2–3	4–3	2–1		4–0	1–1	3–1	2–1
Livar	1–5	1–2	0–3	3–3	2–2	1–2		0–3	0–1	3–0
Maribor	5–2	0–1	1–0	0–3	1–1	3–3	3–2		3–1	1–1
Nafta	0–0	0–0	1–0	1–2	1–0	1–0	4–2	0–1		2–1
Primorje	5–0	0–0	1–1	1–0	0–2	4–0	3–0	1–0	2–1	

Source: PrvaLiga (in Slovene)
Legend: Blue = home team win; Yellow = draw; Red = away team win.

== Top goalscorers ==
Rank	Player	Club	Goals
1	(Croatia) Dario Zahora	Domžale	22
2	(Slovenia) David Bunderla	Primorje	17
3	(Nigeria) Abdulrazak Ekpoki	Gorica	14
3	(Slovenia) Nejc Pečnik	Celje	14
5	(Bosnia and Herzegovina) Enes Demirović	Gorica	13
6	(Slovenia) Marko Kmetec	Drava Ptuj	10
6	(Slovenia) Milan Osterc	Gorica	10
6	(Slovenia) Ermin Rakovič	Interblock	10
6	(Bulgaria) Dimitar Makriev	Maribor	10
6	(Slovenia) Dalibor Volaš	Koper/Maribor	10

Source: PrvaLiga.si

== See also ==
- 2007 Slovenian Supercup
- 2007–08 Slovenian Football Cup
- 2007–08 Slovenian Second League
