= Adewale Sunday Amusan =

Nigerian footballer (born 1989)

Amusan
Personal information
- Full name: Adewale Sunday Amusan
- Date of birth: 12 June 1989 (age 37)
- Place of birth: Makurdi, Nigeria
- Height: 1.64 m (5 ft 5 in)
- Position: Striker

Team information
- Current team: Wikki Tourists F.C.
- Number: 18

Youth career
- 2004–2006: Lobi Stars

Senior career*
Years	Team	Apps	(Gls)
2007–2010	Lobi Stars	83	(19)
2008	→ Koper (loan)	34	(10)
2009	→ Unirea Urziceni (loan)	0	(0)
2010–2012	Rabotnički Skopje	0	(0)
2012–	Wikki Tourists F.C.		
- * Club domestic league appearances and goals

Adewale Sunday Amusan(born 12 June 1989 in Makurdi) is a Nigerian football player who currently plays for the Nigerian team Wikki Tourists F.C. He has previously played in Slovenia, Romania and North Macedonia.

== Career ==
Amusan began his career at the Nigerian team Lobi Stars F.C., then joined the Slovenian side FC Koper on 2 September 2007 on loan for €140.000, returning to Lobi Stars after 18 months.

He signed on 7 February 2009 with the Romanian side FC Unirea Urziceni, on loan from Lobi Stars, playing his first game for his new team in a friendly against FC Shakhtar Donetsk on 25 January 2009 and returning to Lobi Stars in July 2009. He signed in summer 2010 for the Macedonian First League side FK Rabotnički before moving to the Nigerian side Wikki Tourists F.C. in May 2012.

== External sources ==
- (in Slovene)
- Adewale Sunday Amusan club profile at NZS (in Slovene)
