= Amer Jukan =

Slovenian footballer

Personal information
- Full name: Amer Jukan
- Date of birth: 28 November 1978 (age 47)
- Place of birth: Gračanica, SFR Yugoslavia
- Height: 1.69 m (5 ft 7 in)
- Position: Midfielder

Senior career*
| Years | Team | Apps | (Gls) |
| 1998–2001 | Koper | 81 | (4) |
| 2001–2002 | Mura | 19 | (0) |
| 2002–2004 | Marsonia | 26 | (2) |
| 2004–2005 | Hapoel Petah Tikva F.C. | 32 | (1) |
| 2005–2006 | Enosis Neon Paralimni | 10 | (0) |
| 2006–2007 | Cibalia | 44 | (5) |
| 2007–2008 | Koper | 27 | (8) |
| 2008–2010 | Interblock | 28 | (2) |
| 2010 | Koper | 7 | (0) |
| 2011 | Primorje | 20 | (3) |

International career
| 2008 | Slovenia | 2 | (0) |
- * Club domestic league appearances and goals

Amer Jukan (born 28 November 1978) is a Slovenian former football midfielder of Bosnian descent. He was awarded with the title of best player in the Slovenian league in the 2007–08 season, a season in which he also made two appearances for the Slovenia national football team: making his debut on 6 February against Denmark, before playing on 26 March against Hungary.

== Honours ==
=== Hapoel Petah Tikva F.C. ===
- Toto Cup: 2004–05

=== Interblock ===
- Slovenian Football Cup: 2008–09
