= Mitja Zatkovič =

Slovenian footballer

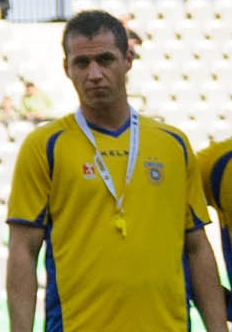
- Zatkovič in 2012

Personal information
- Date of birth: 7 June 1983 (age 43)
- Place of birth: Postojna, SFR Yugoslavia
- Height: 1.86 m (6 ft 1 in)
- Position: Midfielder

Youth career
- 1990–2001: Ilirska Bistrica

Senior career*
Years	Team	Apps	(Gls)
2001–2008	Primorje	157	(24)
2008–2012	Domžale	112	(21)
2012–2013	Belluno	0	(0)
2013	SV Möllbrücke Lurnfeld	13	(8)
2013–2015	Ilirska Bistrica	43	(19)
2015–2016	Izola	24	(2)
2016–2017	SG Steinfeld	26	(1)
2019-2020	SV Sachsenburg	38	(2)

Managerial career
- 2013–2015: Ilirska Bistrica
- * Club domestic league appearances and goals as of 23 May 2012

Mitja Zatkovič (born 7 June 1983) is a Slovenian footballer. For a very short time, he changed to Carinthia and was player for the Club FC Lurnfeld/Moellbruecke ("Unterliga West", 5th league in Austria resp. in Carinthia) from 11 February till 27 August 2013.
