= 2006–07 Slovenian PrvaLiga =

Slovenian PrvaLiga
- Season: 2006–07
- Champions: Domžale (1st title)
- Relegated: Bela Krajina
- Champions League: Domžale
- UEFA Cup: Gorica; Koper (cup winners)
- Intertoto Cup: Maribor
- Matches played: 180
- Goals scored: 529 (2.94 per match)
- Top goalscorer: Nikola Nikezić (22 goals)
- Biggest home win: Gorica 5–0 Interblock; Celje 5–0 Bela Krajina; Gorica 6–1 Domžale
- Biggest away win: Gorica 1–7 Koper
- Highest scoring: Drava 6–4 Koper
- Longest winning run: 5 games Drava
- Longest unbeaten run: 27 games Domžale
- Longest winless run: 14 games Bela Krajina
- Longest losing run: 8 games Bela Krajina
- Highest attendance: 3,500; Maribor 1–1 Domžale
- Lowest attendance: 200; Celje 5–0 Bela Krajina
- Total attendance: 177,979
- Average attendance: 987

The 2006–07 Slovenian PrvaLiga season started on 29 July 2006 and ended on 26 May 2007. Each team played a total of 36 matches.

== League table ==
Pos	Team	Pld	W	D	L	GF	GA	GD	Pts	Qualification or relegation
1	Domžale (C)	36	21	12	3	64	29	+35	75	Qualification to Champions League first qualifying round
2	Gorica	36	17	7	12	66	63	+3	58	Qualification to UEFA Cup first qualifying round
3	Maribor	36	15	12	9	64	50	+14	57	Qualification to Intertoto Cup first round
4	Drava Ptuj	36	15	10	11	61	52	+9	55	
5	Primorje	36	15	10	11	52	47	+5	55	
6	Koper	36	10	15	11	51	46	+5	45	Qualification to UEFA Cup first qualifying round (Note: Koper won the 2006–07 Slovenian Football Cup and qualified for the first qualifying round of the UEFA Cup.)
7	Celje	36	11	12	13	54	51	+3	45	
8	Nafta	36	12	9	15	45	59	−14	45	
9	Interblock (O)	36	5	11	20	34	68	−34	26	Qualification to relegation play-offs
10	Bela Krajina (R)	36	5	10	21	38	64	−26	25	Relegation to Slovenian Second League

Source: PrvaLiga (in Slovene)
(C) Champions; (O) Play-off winners; (R) Relegated

=== Relegation play-offs ===
2 June 2007
17:00 CEST

Interblock	3–1	Bonifika
Wakui 13'; Pavlović 17' (pen.); Gerić 73'	Report	Lizalović 33'

ŽŠD Stadium, Ljubljana
Attendance: 1,000
6 June 2007
17:00 CEST

Bonifika	1–1	Interblock
Begić 60'	Report	Salkić 3'

Bonifika, Koper
Attendance: 700

Interblock won 4–2 on aggregate.

== Results ==
Every team plays four times against their opponents, twice at home and twice on the road, for a total of 36 matches.

=== First half of the season ===
Home \ Away	BKR	CEL	DOM	DRA	GOR	INT	KOP	MAR	NAF	PRI
Bela Krajina		1–1	1–2	2–4	1–1	0–1	2–2	2–1	0–0	2–2
Celje	5–0		1–3	3–3	0–0	1–1	1–1	1–3	1–2	2–0
Domžale	1–0	0–0		1–1	1–0	1–0	3–2	3–1	6–2	3–1
Drava Ptuj	4–2	2–2	1–1		3–1	0–2	2–1	1–1	3–0	0–2
Gorica	1–4	2–0	0–0	3–2		5–0	1–0	1–4	2–0	3–1
Interblock	1–1	2–4	2–2	0–1	1–1		2–2	0–2	1–4	0–4
Koper	2–2	0–2	1–1	1–0	1–1	3–1		2–2	2–2	0–0
Maribor	3–0	2–0	1–1	1–0	1–1	3–2	1–1		1–3	2–0
Nafta	1–0	2–1	1–2	1–1	2–0	2–2	1–1	1–1		2–0
Primorje	2–0	2–0	0–2	1–0	3–3	3–1	0–0	3–2	1–0	

Source: PrvaLiga (in Slovene)
Legend: Blue = home team win; Yellow = draw; Red = away team win.

=== Second half of the season ===
Home \ Away	BKR	CEL	DOM	DRA	GOR	INT	KOP	MAR	NAF	PRI
Bela Krajina		0–2	1–0	0–2	0–1	2–2	1–2	1–1	0–3	0–0
Celje	4–0		1–4	0–0	1–3	1–1	2–3	4–1	0–1	3–1
Domžale	1–0	0–0		2–0	4–0	3–0	2–1	3–0	3–0	1–1
Drava Ptuj	1–6	3–1	1–2		6–4	3–0	2–1	1–1	3–1	1–1
Gorica	3–2	1–3	6–1	2–1		3–2	1–7	4–1	2–1	1–3
Interblock	1–0	0–1	0–0	2–0	0–3		0–1	1–2	2–0	0–0
Koper	2–1	2–0	1–1	1–2	1–2	1–1		2–1	3–1	0–2
Maribor	2–1	2–2	2–0	1–1	3–2	3–0	0–0		6–2	1–1
Nafta	1–2	1–1	0–0	1–3	2–0	3–1	1–0	0–4		1–1
Primorje	2–1	2–3	0–4	1–3	1–2	3–2	2–1	3–1	3–0	

Source: PrvaLiga (in Slovene)
Legend: Blue = home team win; Yellow = draw; Red = away team win.

== Top goalscorers ==
Rank	Player	Club	Goals
1	(Montenegro) Nikola Nikezić	Domžale/Gorica	22
2	(Bosnia and Herzegovina) Sead Zilić	Drava Ptuj	17
3	(Slovenia) Ermin Rakovič	Domžale	16
4	(Serbia) Goran Arnaut	Primorje	13
4	(Bulgaria) Dimitar Makriev	Maribor	13
6	(Slovenia) Damir Pekič	Maribor	12
7	(Slovenia) Mitja Zatkovič	Primorje	11
7	(Slovenia) Tim Matavž	Gorica	11
9	(Slovenia) Zlatan Ljubijankić	Domžale	10
9	(Slovenia) Mitja Brulc	Celje	10

Source: PrvaLiga.si

== See also ==
- 2006–07 Slovenian Football Cup
- 2006–07 Slovenian Second League
