= NK Bela Krajina =

Association football club in Slovenia

Bela Krajina
- Full name: Nogometni klub Bela Krajina Črnomelj
- Founded: 17 November 1930 (as Športni klub Bela krajina)
- Dissolved: 2016; 9 years ago
- Ground: Loka Stadium
- Capacity: 1,517
Home colours	Away colours

Nogometni klub Bela Krajina or simply NK Bela Krajina was a Slovenian football club based in the town of Črnomelj.

== History ==
The club was founded on 17 November 1930 as Športni klub Bela krajina or simply SKB. They played in the Slovenian Republic League until the Second World War. After the war, they played in the lower regional leagues of the Yugoslav football system.

In the 2003–04 Slovenian Second League season, Bela Krajina finished second. In the promotion play-offs, they lost to Drava Ptuj, but were still promoted to the Slovenian First League due to the withdrawal of other teams. In 2005–06, Bela Krajina finished ninth in the top division and had to play in the relegation play-offs. They defeated Dravinja on away goals rule, securing their position in the First League for another season.

In the 2006–07 season, Bela Krajina was relegated back to the Second League after finishing last. They stayed in the Second League until the 2013–14 season, when they finished in last place. Since they failed to obtain a license for the Slovenian Third League, they were relegated directly from the Second League to the Intercommunal level.

NK Bela Krajina was dissolved following the 2015–16 season.

== Slovenian First League placements ==
Season	Place
2004–05	10th
2005–06	9th
2006–07	10th

== Honours ==
- Slovenian Third League
  - Winners: 2000–01
- MNZ Ljubljana Cup
  - Winners: 2007–08, 2008–09
