= Slovenian Supercup =

- Founded: 1995; 31 years ago (original); 2007; 19 years ago (resurrected)
- Abolished: 2015; 11 years ago
- Region: Slovenia
- Teams: 2
- Most championships: Maribor (4 titles)
- Website: nzs.si

The Slovenian Supercup (Slovene: Superpokal Slovenije) was a football match played between the Slovenian PrvaLiga champions and the Slovenian Cup winners. Prior 2007, the match was held only twice, in 1995 and 1996. The competition was resurrected in 2007 and was held annually for nine seasons, before it was abolished after the 2015 edition.

== Winners ==
=== By year ===
Year	Winners	Score	Runners-up	Venue
1995; 26 July 1995	Olimpija; Winners of the 1994–95 PrvaLiga	2–1	Mura; Winners of the 1994–95 Cup	Bežigrad Stadium, Ljubljana
1996; 31 July 1996	Gorica; Winners of the 1995–96 PrvaLiga	3–1	Olimpija; Winners of the 1995–96 Cup	Sports Park, Nova Gorica
2007; 14 July 2007	Domžale; Winners of the 2006–07 PrvaLiga	2–1	Koper; Winners of the 2006–07 Cup	Sports Park, Domžale
2008; 9 July 2008	Interblock; Winners of the 2007–08 Cup	0–0 (a.e.t.); 7–6 pen.	Domžale; Winners of the 2007–08 PrvaLiga	Sports Park, Domžale
2009; 8 July 2009	Maribor; Winners of the 2008–09 PrvaLiga	3–2 (a.e.t.)	Interblock; Winners of the 2008–09 Cup	Ljudski vrt, Maribor
2010; 9 July 2010	Koper; Winners of the 2009–10 PrvaLiga	0–0 (a.e.t.); 5–4 pen.	Maribor; Winners of the 2009–10 Cup	Ljudski vrt, Maribor
2011; 8 July 2011	Domžale; Winners of the 2010–11 Cup	2–1	Maribor; Winners of the 2010–11 PrvaLiga	Ljudski vrt, Maribor
2012; 8 July 2012	Maribor; Winners of the 2011–12 PrvaLiga	2–1	Olimpija Ljubljana; Runners-up of the 2011–12 PrvaLiga	Ljudski vrt, Maribor
2013; 7 July 2013	Maribor; Winners of the 2012–13 PrvaLiga	3–0	Olimpija Ljubljana; Runners-up of the 2012–13 PrvaLiga	Arena Petrol, Celje
2014; 13 August 2014	Maribor; Winners of the 2013–14 PrvaLiga	4–1	Gorica; Winners of the 2013–14 Cup	Sports Park, Nova Gorica
2015; 5 July 2015	Koper; Winners of the 2014–15 Cup	0–0 a.e.t. 3–2 pen.	Maribor; Winners of the 2014–15 PrvaLiga	Bonifika Stadium, Koper

=== By club ===
Club	Wins	Years
Maribor	4	2009, 2012, 2013, 2014
Domžale	2	2007, 2011
Koper	2	2010, 2015
Gorica	1	1996
Interblock	1	2008
Olimpija	1	1995
