= NK IB 1975 Ljubljana =

Slovenian football club

IB 1975 Ljubljana
- Full name: Nogometni klub IB 1975 Ljubljana
- Founded: 1975; 51 years ago (as Ježica); 2007; 19 years ago (as Interblock)
- Ground: Štefan Bele Sports Park
- President: Igor Pušnik
- League: 3. SNL – West
- 2025–26: 3. SNL – West, 8th of 14
- Website: nkib1975-lj.si
Home colours	Away colours

Nogometni klub IB 1975 Ljubljana, known simply as NK IB 1975 Ljubljana, is a Slovenian football club based in Ljubljana that competes in the Slovenian Third League, the third level of the Slovenian football system. They won the Slovenian Cup twice and the Slovenian Supercup once.

== History ==
The club was founded in 1975 as NK Ježica. In the next two decades they competed mostly in the Ljubljana League, which was the fifth or sixth level of Yugoslav football. After the independence of Slovenia the league was transformed into the intercommunal MNZ League, and the club was renamed to NK Factor Ježica. They merged with nearby Črnuče in 1997 and therefore played in Slovenian Second League until 1999. Factor was then relegated to third level, where they stayed until 2004, when they won the centre zone and defeated Korte in promotion play-off. After returning to the second division, the club had to move their home matches to ŽŠD Ljubljana Stadium due to insufficient criteria of their home field.

Factor earned promotion to the Slovenian PrvaLiga in 2006, finishing first in the Slovenian Second League in the 2005–06 season. In 2007, Joc Pečečnik, one of the richest persons in Slovenia, took over NK Factor and renamed them to Interblock Ljubljana. At the end of the 2006–07 season, Interblock came ninth and won a play-off series to remain in the Slovenian PrvaLiga, the first division of Slovenian professional football. In the 2007–08 and 2008–09 seasons, they won the Slovenian Cup. In 2008, they won the Slovenian Supercup, defeating the Slovenian champions Domžale.

In 2010, the club started to cooperate with NK Bravo and the team was renamed to IB Interblock. In the next year, the senior squads of both teams merged and they competed as Bravo1 Interblock in the Second League. In February 2012, Pečečnik, who has left the club after the 2011–12 season, intended to merge their youth selections with NK Bravo Publikum, but after the revolt from parents of the youth selections, the club has remained its own entity. The senior team withdrew from all competitions in 2012 but was reestablished in the 2015–16 season.

== Honours ==
League

- Slovenian Second League
  - Winners (1): 2005–06
  - Runners-up (1): 2010–11
- Slovenian Third League
  - Winners (1): 2003–04
  - Runners-up (2): 2000–01, 2002–03
- Ljubljana Regional League (fourth tier)
  - Winners (1): 2024–25
- MNZ Ljubljana League (fifth tier)
  - Winners (1): 2015–16

Cup

- Slovenian Cup
  - Winners (2): 2007–08, 2008–09
- Slovenian Supercup
  - Winners (1): 2008
  - Runners-up (1): 2009

== European record ==
Season	Competition	Round	Club	Home	Away	Agg.
2008–09	UEFA Cup	1Q	(Montenegro) Zeta	1–0	1–1	2–1
2008–09	UEFA Cup	2Q	(Germany) Hertha BSC	0–2	0–1	0–3
2009–10	UEFA Europa League	3Q	(Ukraine) Metalurh Donetsk	0–3	0–2	0–5

Key

- 1Q: First qualifying round
- 2Q: Second qualifying round
- 3Q: Third qualifying round
