= 2010–11 NK Maribor season =

NK Maribor
2010–11 season
- President: Drago Cotar
- Head Coach: Darko Milanič
- Stadium: Ljudski vrt
- Slovenian League: Winners
- Slovenian Cup: Runners-up
- Slovenian Supercup: Runners-up
- Europa League: Play-off round
- Top goalscorer: League: Marcos Tavares (16); All: Marcos Tavares (21)
- Highest home attendance: 12,000 vs Palermo (26 August 2010)
- Lowest home attendance: 800 vs Triglav (27 November 2010)
- Average home league attendance: 3,589
Home colours	Away colours

The 2010–11 season was the 51st season in the history of NK Maribor and the club's 20th consecutive season in the Slovenian PrvaLiga since the league's establishment in 1991. The team participated in the Slovenian PrvaLiga, Slovenian Football Cup, and UEFA Europa League. The season covers the period from 1 June 2010 to 31 May 2011. The club started and finished the season with Darko Milanič as head coach and were crowned the league champions for the ninth time. They were also runners-up of the Slovenian cup and supercup.

The club began their league campaign with a total of 37 points in their first 15 matches, during which time they were undefeated. This set the new all-time league record for the best start of the season, previously held by Domžale (35 points).

== Season review ==
The team played its opening match of the season in a Supercup final on 9 July 2010, when they lost against Koper after penalties (5–4). The score after regulation was 0–0. Maribor qualified for the final as a Slovenian Cup winner of the previous season. Traditionally, the Supercup final was played at a home stadium of the Slovenian champions, however, in this season it was played in Maribor, due to the construction of a new stadium in Koper at the time.

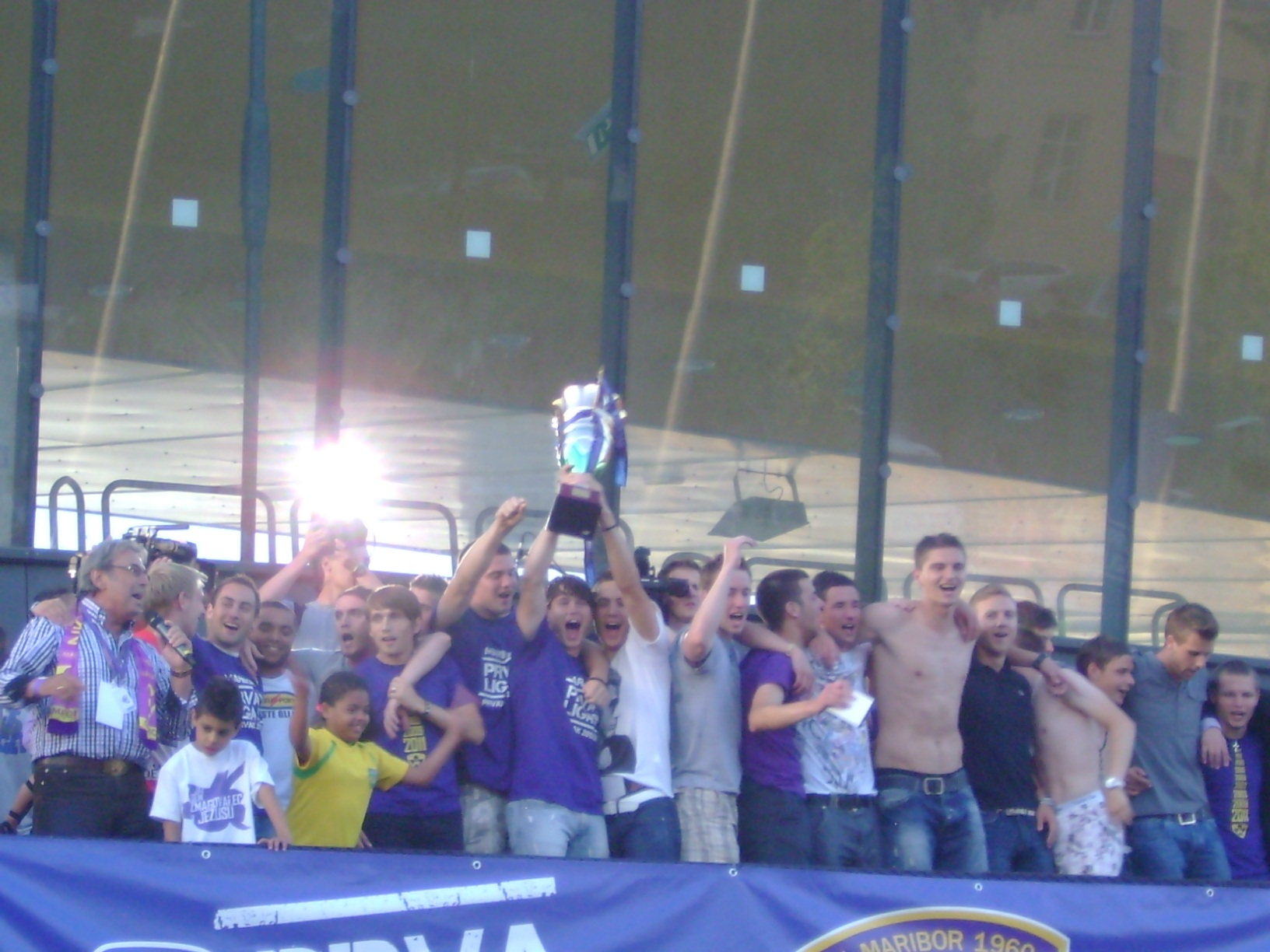
Maribor players celebrating the club's ninth league title

During their Europa League campaign, the club had a solid run and played a total of six matches in the competition. Their record was four wins, one draw and one defeat in matches against Videoton, Hibernian and Palermo. The team did particularly well on home field at the Ljudski vrt stadium as they recorded three wins in three matches with a goal difference of 9–2. However, that was not enough for progression as their only defeat came in the first leg of the play-off round against Palermo (3–0). In the second leg Maribor was winning against the Italian side 2–0 after 60 minutes of play, however, the match eventually finished with a 3–2 home victory which was not enough to progress into the main stage of the competition. After the match it was announced that Palermo had acquired Josip Iličić and Armin Bačinović, two of the top players during the club's Europa league campaign.

The club did extremely well during the 2010–11 PrvaLiga season as the team was in the league's top position after every round of the season, except after week two when they were second. Maribor was undefeated in the league up until the 21st round in March 2011, when they were defeated at home, by Gorica (3–1). Before that the team's score in the first 20 rounds was 14 wins and six draws. Eventually the team won their ninth league title with 75 points, eight more than second placed Domžale. Marcos Tavares, team captain, was the league's best scorer with 16 goals. In addition he was the club's best scorer during the season with 21 goals in all competitions. Tavares was also voted as the best player of the season by the players, the media and the fans. He scored one goal in the 2010–11 Cup season where the team reached the final that was played in late May 2011, at Stožice Stadium in Ljubljana against Domžale. In a spectacular match, which ended with the score of 4–3 after 90 minutes, Domžale prevailed and won their first ever Slovenian cup title. With the 2010–11 Slovenian league title, the club has won its 16th major title in its 20th season in Slovenian football.

== Supercup ==
9 July 2010 Final	Koper	0–0 (a.e.t.) (5–4 p)	Maribor	Maribor
21:00 CEST		Report		Stadium: Ljudski vrt Attendance: 2,000; Referee: Darko Čeferin
	Penalties
	Brulc (penalty scored); Polovanec (penalty scored); Handanagić (penalty missed); Hadžić (penalty scored); Hasić (penalty scored); Bubanja (penalty scored)		Volaš (penalty scored); Bačinović (penalty missed); Mertelj (penalty scored); Tavares (penalty scored); Mezga (penalty scored); Viler (penalty missed)

== Slovenian League ==
=== Standings ===
Pos	Team	Pld	W	D	L	GF	GA	GD	Pts	Qualification or relegation
1	Maribor (C)	36	21	12	3	65	25	+40	75	Qualification to Champions League second qualifying round
2	Domžale	36	20	7	9	57	35	+22	67	Qualification to Europa League second qualifying round (Note: Winners of 2010–11 Slovenian Football Cup competition.)
3	Koper	36	17	9	10	57	43	+14	60	Qualification to Europa League first qualifying round
4	Olimpija	36	15	10	11	59	43	+16	55	Qualification to Europa League first qualifying round
5	Gorica	36	13	9	14	42	53	−11	48	

Source: PrvaLiga (in Slovene)
Rules for classification: 1) points; 2) head-to-head points; 3) head-to-head goal difference; 4) head-to-head goals scored; 5) goal difference; 6) number of goals scored.
(C) Champions

==== Results summary ====
Overall								Home						Away					
Pld	W	D	L	GF	GA	GD	Pts	W	D	L	GF	GA	GD	W	D	L	GF	GA	GD
36	21	12	3	65	25	+40	75	11	5	2	35	13	+22	10	7	1	30	12	+18

Last updated: 29 May 2011.

==== Results by round ====
Round	1	2	3	4	5	6	7	8	9	10	11	12	13	14	15	16	17	18	19	20	21	22	23	24	25	26	27	28	29	30	31	32	33	34	35	36
Ground	H	A	H	A	H	H	A	H	A	A	H	A	H	A	A	H	A	H	H	A	H	A	H	H	A	H	A	A	H	A	H	A	A	H	A	H
Result	W	D	W	W	W	W	W	D	W	D	W	W	D	W	W	W	D	D	W	W	L	D	L	W	L	W	D	W	W	W	D	D	D	D	W	W
Position	1	2	1	1	1	1	1	1	1	1	1	1	1	1	1	1	1	1	1	1	1	1	1	1	1	1	1	1	1	1	1	1	1	1	1	1

Updated to match(es) played on 29 May 2011. Source: PrvaLiga official website
A = Away; H = Home; W = Win; D = Draw; L = Loss

=== Matches ===
Win Draw Loss

18 July 2010 1	Maribor	5–0	Triglav Kranj	Maribor
18:00 CET	Pavličić 8'; Plut 18', 44', 50'; Mertelj 90'	Report		Stadium: Ljudski vrt Attendance: 1,500; Referee: Vojko Goričan

25 July 2010 2	Rudar Velenje	0–0	Maribor	Velenje
20:00 CET		Report		Stadium: Ob Jezeru; Attendance: 3,000; Referee: Boris Tošeski

1 August 2010 3	Maribor	3–1	Gorica	Maribor
18:00 CET	Cvijanović 13', 26'; Džinić 34'	Report	Mevlja 52'	Stadium: Ljudski vrt Attendance: 1,800; Referee: Damir Skomina

29 September 2010 4	Olimpija	0–1	Maribor	Ljubljana
18:00 CET		Report	Berić 27'	Stadium: Stožice; Attendance: 10,000; Referee: Damir Skomina

14 August 2010 5	Maribor	3–1	Nafta Lendava	Maribor
18:00 CET	Tavares 40', 77', 86'	Report	Benko 45'	Stadium: Ljudski vrt Attendance: 1,500; Referee: Dejan Balažič

22 August 2010 6	Maribor	2–0	Celje	Maribor
19:00 CET	Iličić 9'; Berić 21'	Report		Stadium: Ljudski vrt Attendance: 1,500; Referee: Dejan Balažič

29 August 2010 7	Koper	0–1	Maribor	Nova Gorica
19:00 CET		Report	Berić 68'	Stadium: Sports Park; Attendance: 350; Referee: Miran Bukovec

11 September 2010 8	Maribor	1–1	Primorje	Maribor
20:00 CET	Volaš 48'	Report	Lo Duca 16'	Stadium: Ljudski vrt Attendance: 1,500; Referee: Damir Skomina

9 October 2010 9	Domžale	0–1	Maribor	Domžale
20:15 CET		Report	Majer (yellow card) 35, 40' (red card); Tavares (yellow card) 36'; Volaš 89' (yellow card) 90'	Stadium: Sports Park; Attendance: 1,500; Referee: Sašo Habjanič

22 September 2010 10	Triglav Kranj	2–2	Maribor	Kranj
16:00 CET	Burgar 71'; Stjepanović 90'	Report	Volaš 30', 45' (pen.)	Stadium: Stanko Mlakar Stadium; Attendance: 700; Referee: Matej Jug

25 September 2010 11	Maribor	3–1	Rudar Velenje	Maribor
20:15 CET	Pavličić 18'; Rep 66', 89'	Report	Djermanović 65'	Stadium: Ljudski vrt Attendance: 1,000; Referee: Dejan Balažič

30 September 2010 12	Gorica	0–2	Maribor	Nova Gorica
18:00 CET		Report	Tavares 20'; Cvijanović 55'	Stadium: Športni park Nova Gorica; Attendance: 700; Referee: Dragoslav Perić

16 October 2010 13	Maribor	0–0	Olimpija	Maribor
20:15 CET		Report		Stadium: Ljudski vrt Attendance: 8,000; Referee: Matej Jug

23 October 2010 14	Nafta Lendava	0–2	Maribor	Lendava
18:00 CET		Report	Tavares 59', 82'	Stadium: Sports Park; Attendance: 1,500; Referee: Damir Skomina

30 October 2010 15	Celje	0–4	Maribor	Celje
18:00 CET		Report	Volaš 5', 45', 64'; Tavares 26'	Stadium: Arena Petrol; Attendance: 1,500; Referee: Darko Čeferin

6 November 2010 16	Maribor	2–0	Koper	Maribor
18:00 CET	Tavares 27'; Cvijanović 43'	Report		Stadium: Ljudski vrt Attendance: 2,000; Referee: Dragoslav Perić

14 November 2010 17	Primorje	0–0	Maribor	Ajdovščina
13:00 CET		Report		Stadium: Ajdovščina Football Stadium; Attendance: 500; Referee: Emir Huselja

20 November 2010 18	Maribor	1–1	Domžale	Maribor
19:00 CET	Berić 77'	Report	Apatič 90'	Stadium: Ljudski vrt Attendance: 3,000; Referee: Darko Čeferin

27 November 2010 19	Maribor	3–1	Triglav Kranj	Maribor
18:00 CET	Tavares 35'; Milec 58', 74'	Report	Burgar 23'	Stadium: Ljudski vrt Attendance: 800; Referee: Bojan Mertik

26 February 2011 20	Rudar Velenje	2–4	Maribor	Velenje
14:00 CET	Mujaković 44'; Čadikovski 69'	Report	Tavares 16'; Mezga 53' (pen.), 88'; Velikonja 56'	Stadium: Ob Jezeru; Attendance: 2,000; Referee: Matej Jug

5 March 2011 21	Maribor	1–2	Gorica	Maribor
18:00 CET	Berić 10'	Report	Rakušček 16'; Vicente 45'	Stadium: Ljudski vrt Attendance: 3,500; Referee: Boris Tošeski

12 March 2011 22	Olimpija	0–0	Maribor	Ljubljana
20:30 CET		Report		Stadium: Stožice; Attendance: 5,000; Referee: Darko Čeferin

16 March 2011 23	Maribor	0–1	Nafta Lendava	Maribor
18:00 CET		Report	Oluić 21'	Stadium: Ljudski vrt Attendance: 2,000; Referee: Dejan Balažič

19 March 2011 24	Maribor	2–0	Celje	Maribor
20:15 CET	Milec 11'; Tavares 33'	Report		Stadium: Ljudski vrt Attendance: 4,500; Referee: Andrej Žnidaršič

2 April 2011 25	Koper	3–0	Maribor	Koper
20:15 CET	Struna 47'; Hasić 69' (pen.); Vassiljev 75'	Report		Stadium: Bonifika; Attendance: 2,500; Referee: Davor Drečnik

5 April 2011 26	Maribor	2–0	Primorje	Maribor
18:00 CET	Mezga 46', 61'	Report		Stadium: Ljudski vrt Attendance: 3,500; Referee: Mitja Žganec

9 April 2011 27	Domžale	2–2	Maribor	Domžale
20:15 CET	Juninho 55'; Pekič 82' (pen.)	Report	Knezović 8' (o.g.); Tavares 33'	Stadium: Sports Park; Attendance: 2,000; Referee: Damir Skomina

17 April 2011 28	Triglav Kranj	1–2	Maribor	Kranj
17:00 CET	Jelar 28'	Report	Mezga 23'; Berić 73'	Stadium: Stanko Mlakar Stadium; Attendance: 600; Referee: Sašo Habjanič

23 April 2011 29	Maribor	2–1	Rudar Velenje	Maribor
20:00 CET	Velikonja 19'; Viler 81'	Report	Rotman 43'	Stadium: Ljudski vrt Attendance: 4,000; Referee: Davor Drečnik

30 April 2011 30	Gorica	0–6	Maribor	Nova Gorica
20:00 CET		Report	Tavares 17', 44', 52'; Cvijanović 29'; Velikonja 46'; Mezga 48'	Stadium: Sports Park; Attendance: 440; Referee: Darko Čeferin

4 May 2011 31	Maribor	2–2	Olimpija	Maribor
18:00 CET	Velikonja 45'; Berić 87'	Report	Škerjanc 5'; Jović 89'	Stadium: Ljudski vrt Attendance: 9,500; Referee: Damir Skomina

7 May 2011 32	Nafta Lendava	1–1	Maribor	Lendava
18:30 CET	Levačič 9'	Report	Rajčević 82'	Stadium: Sports Park; Attendance: 1,400; Referee: Dragoslav Perić

10 May 2011 33	Celje	0–0	Maribor	Celje
20:00 CET		Report		Stadium: Arena Petrol; Attendance: 2,000; Referee: Andrej Tratnjek

14 May 2011 34	Maribor	1–1	Koper	Maribor
18:30 CET	Velikonja 70'	Report	Bubanja 19'	Stadium: Ljudski vrt Attendance: 4,000; Referee: Boris Tošeski

21 May 2011 35	Primorje	1–2	Maribor	Ajdovščina
18:00 CET	Kolman 43'	Report	Tavares 72'; Berić 84'	Stadium: Ajdovščina Football Stadium; Attendance: 500; Referee: Andrej Žnidaršič

29 May 2011 36	Maribor	2–0	Domžale	Maribor
17:00 CET	Velikonja 30'; Ploj 82'	Report		Stadium: Ljudski vrt Attendance: 11,000; Referee: Darko Čeferin

== Slovenian Cup ==
15 September 2010 Round of 16	Dob	1–1 (5–6 p)	Maribor	Dob
16:00 CET	Kunstelj 31'	Report	Volaš 79'	Stadium: Sports Park; Attendance: 600; Referee: Vojko Goričan
	Penalties
	Kujović; Kovjenić; Mešanović; Mohar		Tavares; Volaš; Bunderla; Džinić; Rajčević

20 October 2010 Quarter-finals 1st leg	Nafta Lendava	1–1	Maribor	Lendava
18:00 CET	Pavel 56'	Report	Volaš 65'	Stadium: Sports Park; Attendance: 1,200; Referee: Davor Drečnik

27 October 2010 Quarter-finals 2nd leg	Maribor	4–0 (5–1 agg.)	Nafta Lendava	Maribor
18:00 CET	Tavares 9'; Dodlek 38'; Volaš 52' (pen.); Mertelj 70'	Report		Stadium: Ljudski vrt Attendance: 1,000; Referee: Boris Tošeski

20 April 2011 Semi-finals 1st leg	Koper	1–1	Maribor	Koper
20:00 CET	Osterc 10'	Report	Mezga 89' (pen.)	Stadium: Bonifika; Attendance: 1,500; Referee: Matej Jug

26 April 2011 Semi-finals 2nd leg	Maribor	1–0 (2–1 agg.)	Koper	Maribor
18:00 CET	Velikonja 55'	Report		Stadium: Ljudski vrt Attendance: 4,500; Referee: Vojko Goričan

25 May 2011 Final	Domžale	4–3	Maribor	Ljubljana
20:45 CEST	Juninho 22'; Pekič 38', 78'; Šimunović 51'	Report	Filipović 15'; Berič 55'; Mezga 63' (pen.)	Stadium: Stožice; Attendance: 6,000; Referee: Damir Skomina

== UEFA Europa League ==
=== Second qualifying round ===
15 July 2010 First leg	Videoton (Hungary)	1–1	(Slovenia) Maribor	Győr, Hungary
20:30 CET	Horváth 79'	Report	Mezga 30'	Stadium: ETO Park; Attendance: 3,850; Referee: Viktor Shvetsov (Russia)

22 July 2010 Second leg	Maribor (Slovenia)	2–0 (3–1 agg.)	(Hungary) Videoton	Maribor, Slovenia
20:30 CET	Volaš 39', 80'	Report		Stadium: Ljudski vrt Attendance: 7,000; Referee: Euan Norris (Scotland)

=== Third qualifying round ===
29 July 2010 First leg	Maribor (Slovenia)	3–0	(Scotland) Hibernian	Maribor, Slovenia
20:30 CET	Iličić 31', 52'; Tavares 60'	Report		Stadium: Ljudski vrt Attendance: 9,000; Referee: Martin Ingvarsson (Sweden)

5 August 2010 Second leg	Hibernian (Scotland)	2–3 (2–6 agg.)	(Slovenia) Maribor	Edinburgh, Scotland
20:45 CET	De Graaf 54', 89'	Report	Tavares 20', 73'; Mezga 67' (pen.)	Stadium: Easter Road; Attendance: 11,500; Referee: Clément Turpin (France)

=== Play-off round ===
19 August 2010 First leg	Palermo (Italy)	3–0	(Slovenia) Maribor	Palermo, Italy
20:30 CET	Maccarone 37' (pen.); Hernández 52'; Pastore 77'	Report		Stadium: Renzo Barbera; Attendance: 28,416; Referee: Douglas McDonald (Scotland)

26 August 2010 Second leg	Maribor (Slovenia)	3–2 (3–5 agg.)	(Italy) Palermo	Maribor, Slovenia
20:45 CET	Tavares 14'; Iličić 58'; Anđelković 89'	Report	Hernández 62', 68'	Stadium: Ljudski vrt Attendance: 12,000; Referee: Stanislav Sukhina (Russia)

== Squad statistics ==
=== Key ===
Players

- No. = Shirt number
- Pos. = Playing position
- GK = Goalkeeper
- DF = Defender
- MF = Midfielder
- FW = Forward

Nationality

- = Brazil
- = Croatia
- = Slovenia

Competitions

- Apps = Appearances
- = Yellow card
- (red card) = Red card

Key
†	The player was selected in the official 2010–11 Slovenian PrvaLiga team of the season and was chosen as the league's MVP
‡	The player was selected in the official 2010–11 Slovenian PrvaLiga team of the season
♦	The player was the top scorer in the respective competition

=== Appearances and goals ===
Correct as of 29 May 2011, end of the 2010–11 season. Flags indicate national team as has been defined under FIFA eligibility rules. Players may hold more than one non-FIFA nationality. The players squad numbers, playing positions, nationalities and statistics are based solely on match reports in Matches sections above and the official website of NK Maribor and the Slovenian PrvaLiga. Player in bold received the Purple Warrior trophy as the club's most valuable player, selected by the fans. Only the players, which made at least one appearance for the first team, are listed.

List of Maribor players, who represented the team during the 2010–11 season, and displaying their statistics during that timeframe
No.	Pos.	Name	Apps	Goals	Apps	Goals	Apps	Goals	Apps	Goals	Apps	Goals
No.	Pos.	Name	League		Cup		Supercup		Europa League		Total	
2	DF	(Slovenia) Matic Črnic	3	0	1	0	—	—	—	—	4	0
3	DF	(Slovenia) Elvedin Džinić	11	1	1	0	—	—	1	0	13	1
4	DF	(Slovenia) Jovan Vidović	7	0	1	0	—	—	—	—	8	0
5	MF	(Slovenia) Željko Filipović	14	0	4	1	—	—	—	—	18	1
6	DF	(Slovenia) Martin Milec	8	3	—	—	—	—	—	—	8	3
7	DF	(Slovenia) Aleš Mejač	12	0	1	0	1	0	5	0	19	0
8	MF	(Croatia) Dejan Mezga ‡	21	6	4	2	1	0	6	2	32	10
9	FW	(Brazil) **Marcos Tavares** †	33	16 ♦	6	1	1	0	6	4	46	21
10	MF	(Croatia) Tomislav Pavličić	15	2	3	0	1	0	2	0	21	2
11	FW	(Slovenia) Dragan Jelić	5	0	—	—	1	0	3	0	9	0
11	FW	(Slovenia) Etien Velikonja	16	6	3	1	—	—	—	—	19	7
12	GK	(Slovenia) Marko Pridigar	13	0	1	0	1	0	5	0	20	0
13	GK	(Slovenia) Matej Radan	24	0	5	0	—	—	2	0	31	0
14	FW	(Slovenia) Vito Plut	17	3	2	0	—	—	3	0	22	3
15	DF	(Slovenia) Luka Krajnc	1	0	—	—	—	—	—	—	1	0
17	FW	(Slovenia) Dalibor Volaš	15	7	3	3	1	0	6	2	25	12
20	MF	(Slovenia) Goran Cvijanović	34	5	6	0	1	0	6	0	47	5
21	MF	(Slovenia) Armin Bačinović	3	0	—	—	1	0	6	0	10	0
22	DF	(Slovenia) Nejc Potokar	13	0	2	0	—	—	—	—	15	0
23	DF	(Slovenia) Mitja Rešek	3	0	1	0	—	—	—	—	4	0
25	MF	(Slovenia) Semir Spahić	1	0	—	—	—	—	—	—	1	0
26	DF	(Slovenia) Aleksander Rajčević ‡	29	1	6	0	1	0	6	0	42	1
27	MF	(Slovenia) Josip Iličić	5	1	—	—	—	—	6	3	11	4
27	FW	(Slovenia) Alen Ploj	2	1	1	0	—	—	—	—	3	1
28	DF	(Slovenia) Mitja Viler ‡	35	1	6	0	1	0	6	0	48	1
29	MF	(Slovenia) Timotej Dodlek	29	0	4	1	—	—	1	0	34	1
32	FW	(Slovenia) Robert Berić	30	8	4	1	—	—	1	0	35	9
36	DF	(Slovenia) Aleš Majer	26	0	6	0	—	—	—	—	32	0
39	FW	(Slovenia) David Bunderla	3	0	1	0	—	—	1	0	5	0
55	MF	(Slovenia) Rajko Rep	26	2	4	0	—	—	—	—	30	2
66	DF	(Slovenia) Siniša Andjelković	18	0	2	0	1	0	6	1	27	1
70	MF	(Slovenia) Aleš Mertelj	20	1	3	1	1	0	6	0	30	2
90	MF	(Brazil) Gabriel	7	0	1	0	—	—	—	—	8	0

=== Discipline ===
Correct as of 29 May 2011, end of the 2010–11 season. Flags indicate national team as has been defined under FIFA eligibility rules. Players may hold more than one non-FIFA nationality. The players squad numbers, playing positions, nationalities and statistics are based solely on match reports in Matches sections above and the official website of NK Maribor and the Slovenian PrvaLiga. If a player received two yellow cards in a match and was subsequently sent off the numbers count as two yellow cards, one red card. Player in bold received the Purple Warrior trophy as the club's most valuable player, selected by the fans. Only the players, which received at least one yellow or red card, are listed.

List of Maribor players, who represented the team during the 2010–11 season, and displaying their statistics during that timeframe
No.	Pos.	Name	Yellow card	Red card	Yellow card	Red card	Yellow card	Red card	Yellow card	Red card	Yellow card	Red card
No.	Pos.	Name	League		Cup		Supercup		Europa League		Total	
3	DF	(Slovenia) Elvedin Džinić	1	0	0	0	—	—	0	0	1	0
4	DF	(Slovenia) Jovan Vidović	5	0	—	—	—	—	—	—	5	0
5	MF	(Slovenia) Željko Filipović	4	1	1	0	—	—	—	—	5	1
6	DF	(Slovenia) Martin Milec	2	0	—	—	—	—	—	—	2	0
7	DF	(Slovenia) Aleš Mejač	2	0	0	0	0	0	2	0	4	0
8	MF	(Croatia) Dejan Mezga ‡	6	0	0	0	1	0	0	0	7	0
9	FW	(Brazil) **Marcos Tavares** †	5	0	2	0	0	0	0	0	7	0
11	FW	(Slovenia) Etien Velikonja	1	0	1	0	—	—	—	—	2	0
12	GK	(Slovenia) Marko Pridigar	0	0	0	0	0	0	0	1	0	1
13	GK	(Slovenia) Matej Radan	2	0	1	0	—	—	0	0	3	0
17	FW	(Slovenia) Dalibor Volaš	1	0	0	0	0	0	1	0	2	0
20	MF	(Slovenia) Goran Cvijanović	3	0	0	0	0	0	0	0	3	0
21	MF	(Slovenia) Armin Bačinović	0	0	—	—	1	0	1	0	2	0
22	DF	(Slovenia) Nejc Potokar	4	1	0	0	—	—	—	—	4	1
23	DF	(Slovenia) Mitja Rešek	1	0	1	0	—	—	—	—	2	0
26	DF	(Slovenia) Aleksander Rajčević ‡	3	0	2	0	0	0	0	0	5	0
27	MF	(Slovenia) Josip Iličić	1	0	—	—	—	—	0	0	1	0
28	DF	(Slovenia) Mitja Viler ‡	4	1	1	0	0	0	1	0	6	1
29	MF	(Slovenia) Timotej Dodlek	2	1	0	0	—	—	0	0	2	1
32	FW	(Slovenia) Robert Berić	4	1	0	0	—	—	0	0	4	1
36	DF	(Slovenia) Aleš Majer	9	1	1	0	—	—	—	—	10	1
55	MF	(Slovenia) Rajko Rep	5	1	0	0	—	—	—	—	5	1
66	DF	(Slovenia) Siniša Andjelković	1	0	0	0	0	0	0	0	1	0
70	MF	(Slovenia) Aleš Mertelj	4	0	0	0	0	0	0	0	4	0
90	MF	(Brazil) Gabriel	1	0	0	0	—	—	—	—	1	0

== Transfers and loans ==
=== Summer transfer window ===
Transfer	Position	Name	Nat.	From / last	To	Note
Transfer out	MF	Rene Mihelič	(Slovenia)	Maribor	Nacional	Undisclosed transfer fee
Transfer out	MF	Dejan Školnik	(Croatia)	Maribor	Nacional	Undisclosed transfer fee
Transfer in	DF	Aleksander Rajčević	(Slovenia)	Koper	Maribor	Free agent
Transfer in	DF	Mitja Viler	(Slovenia)	Koper	Maribor	Free agent
Transfer in	MF	Tomislav Pavličić	(Croatia)	Cibalia	Maribor	Free agent
Transfer in	MF	Goran Cvijanović	(Slovenia)	Gorica	Maribor	Free agent
Transfer in	MF	Josip Iličić	(Slovenia)	Interblock	Maribor	Co-ownership deal
Transfer in	FW	Robert Berić	(Slovenia)	Interblock	Maribor	Co-ownership deal
Transfer out	MF	Josip Iličić	(Slovenia)	Maribor	Palermo	Undisclosed transfer fee, alleged to be around €2,3 million
Transfer out	MF	Armin Bačinović	(Slovenia)	Maribor	Palermo	Undisclosed transfer fee, alleged to be around €1,2 million
Transfer in	MF	Rajko Rep	(Slovenia)	Celje	Maribor	Undisclosed transfer fee, alleged to be around €0,3 million
Loan out	FW	Dragan Jelić	(Slovenia)	Maribor	Krylia Sovetov	Three month loan until 30 November 2010
Loan out	FW	Armend Sprečo	(Slovenia)	Maribor	Mura 05	Loan until 1 June 2011
Loan out	GK	Matej Radan	(Slovenia)	Maribor	Mura 05	Loan
Transfer out	GK	Miha Bratušek	(Slovenia)	Maribor	Aluminij	Free transfer
Transfer in	MF	Željko Filipović	(Slovenia)	Koper	Maribor	Released by the club

=== Winter transfer window ===
Transfer	Position	Name	Nat.	From / last	To	Note
Transfer out	DF	Siniša Anđelković	(Slovenia)	Maribor	Palermo	Undisclosed transfer fee
Transfer in	DF	Jovan Vidović	(Slovenia)	Domžale	Maribor	Undisclosed transfer fee
Transfer in	MF	Da Silva	(Brazil)	Olimpija	Maribor	Released by the club
Transfer out	DF	Elvedin Džinič	(Slovenia)	Maribor	Charleroi	Undisclosed transfer fee
Transfer in	FW	Etien Velikonja	(Slovenia)	Gorica	Maribor	Undisclosed transfer fee + Vito Plut
Transfer out	FW	Vito Plut	(Slovenia)	Maribor	Gorica	Part of Etien Velikonja transfer
Transfer out	FW	Dalibor Volaš	(Slovenia)	Maribor	Sheriff	Undisclosed transfer fee
Transfer out	FW	David Bunderla	(Slovenia)	Maribor	Koper	Released by the club
Loan out	FW	Dragan Jelić	(Slovenia)	Maribor	Willem II	Loan until 1 June 2011
Loan out	MF	Semir Spahić	(Slovenia)	Maribor	Drava	Loan until 1 June 2011

== Footnotes ==
- ^{A} Knockout matches which were decided on penalty kicks are listed as a draw.
- ^{B} Traditionally, the Slovenian Supercup is played at the stadium of the previous year league champions. FC Koper has won the 2009–10 Slovenian PrvaLiga, however, their Bonifika Stadium was closed at the time of the match due to redevelopment, and the 2010 final was played at the Ljudski vrt stadium in Maribor, the home of NK Maribor. Thus, the match is listed as being played at home.

== See also ==
- List of NK Maribor seasons
