= 2010 Slovenian Supercup =

- Event: 2010 Slovenian Supercup
Koper	Maribor
0	0
- Koper won 5–4 on penalties
- Date: 9 July 2010
- Venue: Ljudski vrt, Maribor
- Referee: Darko Čeferin
- Attendance: 2,000

The 2010 Slovenian Supercup was a football match between the 2009–10 PrvaLiga champions Koper and the 2009–10 Slovenian Football Cup winners Maribor. Usually the supercup final is played at the stadium of the league champions, however, in this edition it was played at the Ljudski vrt stadium in Maribor, because the Bonifika Stadium in Koper was closed at the time due to renovations.

== Match details ==
9 July 2010
21:00 CEST

Koper	0–0 (a.e.t.)	Maribor
	Report
Penalties
Brulc (penalty scored); Polovanec (penalty scored); Handanagić (penalty missed); Hadžić (penalty scored); Hasić (penalty scored); Bubanja (penalty scored)	5–4	(penalty scored) Volaš; (penalty missed) Bačinović; (penalty scored) Mertelj; (penalty scored) Tavares; (penalty scored) Mezga; (penalty missed) Viler

Ljudski vrt, Maribor
Attendance: 2,000
Referee: Darko Čeferin

Koper	Maribor

Koper:
GK	1	(Slovenia) Ermin Hasić
RB	24	(Slovenia) Andraž Struna
CB	6	(Slovenia) Enes Handanagić	Booked
CB	5	(Croatia) Kristijan Polovanec
LB	23	(Slovenia) Amir Karić	(substituted off) 78'	Booked
RM	21	(Bosnia and Herzegovina) Ivan Sesar	Booked
CM	8	(Slovenia) Nebojša Kovačević	(substituted off) 86'
CM	32	(Slovenia) Davor Bubanja
LM	11	(Slovenia) Miran Pavlin (c)
FW	22	(Slovenia) Danijel Marčeta	(substituted off) 78'
FW	25	(Slovenia) Mitja Brulc
Substitutes:
DF	27	(Slovenia) Damir Hadžić	(substituted in) 78'
MF	7	(Slovenia) Ivica Guberac	(substituted in) 86'
FW	28	(Slovenia) Enej Jelenič	(substituted in) 78'
Manager:
(Slovenia) Nedžad Okčić

Maribor:
GK	12	(Slovenia) Marko Pridigar (c)
RB	7	(Slovenia) Aleš Mejač
CB	66	(Slovenia) Siniša Andjelković
CB	26	(Slovenia) Aleksander Rajčević
LB	28	(Slovenia) Mitja Viler
CM	10	(Croatia) Tomislav Pavličić	(substituted off) 55'
CM	21	(Slovenia) Armin Bačinović	Booked
CM	70	(Slovenia) Aleš Mertelj
FW	11	(Slovenia) Dragan Jelić	(substituted off) 55'
FW	39	(Slovenia) David Bunderla	(substituted off) 76'
FW	9	(Brazil) Marcos Tavares
Substitutes:
GK	8	(Croatia) Dejan Mezga	(substituted in) 55'	Booked
MF	20	(Slovenia) Goran Cvijanović	(substituted in) 55'
FW	17	(Slovenia) Dalibor Volaš	(substituted in) 76'
Manager:
(Slovenia) Darko Milanič

Man of the Match:
(Slovenia) Ermin Hasić (Koper)

Assistant referees:
Anton Šinkovec
Marjan Tompa

Slovenian Supercup
2010 Winners
Koper
1st title

== See also ==
- 2009–10 Slovenian PrvaLiga
- 2009–10 Slovenian Football Cup
- 2010–11 NK Maribor season
