= Kristijan =

Kristijan is a given name. Notable people with the name include:

- Kristijan Brčić (born 1987), Croatian football midfielder, plays for C.D. Nacional on loan from NK Inter Zaprešić
- Kristijan Čaval (born 1978), Croatian football midfielder, currently playing for NK Slaven Belupo
- Kristijan Dobras (born 1992), Australian football midfielder
- Kristijan Đorđević (born 1976), retired Serbian footballer
- Kristijan Golubović (born 1969), Serbian mafioso
- Kristijan Ipša (born 1986), Croatian football defender, currently playing for FC Midtjylland
- Kristijan Polovanec (born 1979), Croatian professional footballer who plays for FC Koper

== See also ==
- Christian (given name)
