= 2009 Slovenian Supercup =

- Event: 2009 Slovenian Supercup
Maribor	Interblock
3	2
- After extra time
- Date: 8 July 2009
- Venue: Ljudski vrt, Maribor
- Referee: Damir Skomina
- Attendance: 2,500

The 2009 Slovenian Supercup was a football match that saw the 2008–09 PrvaLiga champions Maribor face off against Slovenian Cup winners Interblock. The match was held on 8 July 2009 at Ljudski vrt in Maribor.

== Match details ==
8 July 2009
20:45 CEST

Maribor	3–2 (a.e.t.)	Interblock
Pavlović 33' (pen.); Kokot 74' (o.g.); Bunderla 102'	Report	Rakovič 35'; Jelečevič 41'

Ljudski vrt, Maribor
Attendance: 2,500
Referee: Damir Skomina

Maribor	Interblock

Maribor:
GK	1	(Slovenia) Marko Ranilović
RB	7	(Slovenia) Aleš Mejač		(substituted off) 99'
CB	3	(Slovenia) Elvedin Džinić
CB	18	(Slovenia) Matjaž Lunder
LB	6	(Slovenia) Dejan Jurkič
RM	70	(Slovenia) Aleš Mertelj		(substituted off) 70'
MF	21	(Slovenia) Armin Bačinović	(yellow card) 4'
MF	33	(Slovenia) Zoran Pavlović (c)	(yellow card) 48'
LM	10	(Slovenia) Rene Mihelič	(yellow card) 105'
FW	14	(Slovenia) Dragan Jelić		(substituted off) 79'
FW	9	(Brazil) Marcos Tavares
Substitutes:
GK	12	(Slovenia) Marko Pridigar
DF	5	(Montenegro) Željko Kljajević
DF	27	(Serbia) Marko Popović		(substituted in) 99'
MF	2	(Slovenia) Matic Črnic
MF	29	(Slovenia) Timotej Dodlek
FW	30	(Slovenia) Dalibor Volaš		(substituted in) 70'
FW	39	(Slovenia) David Bunderla		(substituted in) 79'
Manager:
(Slovenia) Darko Milanič

Interblock:
GK	22	(Slovenia) Matjaž Rozman
RB	23	(Slovenia) Boštjan Jelečevič
CB	25	(England) Ben Gill	(yellow card) 88'
CB	19	(Slovenia) Aleš Kokot
LB	33	(Slovenia) Suvad Grabus
CM	5	(Cameroon) Enow Juvette Tabot
CM	7	(Slovenia) Danijel Brezič	(yellow card) 22'
AM	18	(Slovenia) Amer Jukan		(substituted off) 62'
RW	27	(Slovenia) Josip Iličić	(yellow card) 45'
ST	10	(Slovenia) Ermin Rakovič (c)		(substituted off) 72'
LW	16	(Slovenia) Luka Majcen	(yellow card) 72'	(substituted off) 91'
Substitutes:
GK	1	(Slovenia) Janez Strajnar
DF	20	(Cameroon) Theophile Junior Ntamé
MF	30	(Slovenia) Matic Fink
MF	2	(Slovenia) Nejc Skubic
MF	24	(Slovenia) Dejan Zadnikar		(substituted in) 72'
MF	8	(Slovenia) Dejan Gerič		(substituted in) 91'
MF	32	(Slovenia) Blaž Božič		(substituted in) 62'
Manager:
(Slovenia) Igor Benedejčič

Match officials

- Assistant referees:
  - Robert Zirnstein
  - Milan Kogej
- Fourth official: Frank Pavel

Man of the Match

- David Bunderla (Maribor)

Match rules

- 90 minutes.
- 30 minutes of extra time if scores level
- Penalty shoot-out if scores still level
- Seven named substitutes
- Maximum of 3 substitutions.

== See also ==
- 2008–09 Slovenian PrvaLiga
- 2008–09 Slovenian Cup
