= Ivan Sesar =

Bosnian professional footballer (born 1989)

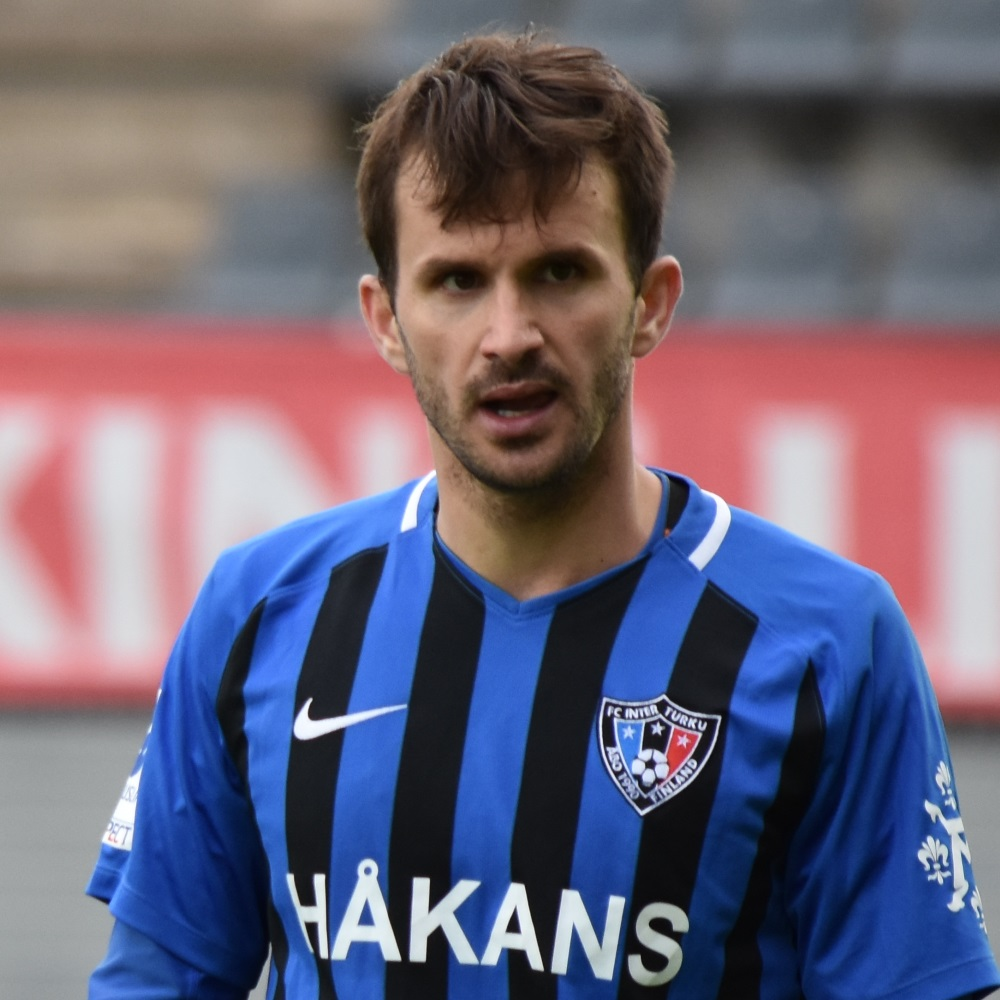
- Sesar playing for Inter Turku in 2018

Personal information
- Full name: Ivan Sesar
- Date of birth: 29 August 1989 (age 37)
- Place of birth: Mostar, SFR Yugoslavia
- Height: 1.82 m (5 ft 11 1/2 in)
- Position: Midfielder

Youth career
- –2006: Široki Brijeg
- 2006–2008: Zagreb

Senior career*
Years	Team	Apps	(Gls)
2008–2009	Zagreb	1	(0)
2009–2010	Koper	26	(0)
2010–2011	Lokomotiva Zagreb	23	(1)
2011–2013	Sarajevo	34	(0)
2013	→ Elazığspor (loan)	14	(0)
2013–2014	Akhisar Belediyespor	12	(0)
2015	Dunajská Streda	8	(0)
2015–2017	Široki Brijeg	48	(1)
2017	Juventus București	16	(0)
2018	Inter Turku	13	(0)
2018	Voluntari	6	(0)
2019–2020	Tuzla City	28	(0)
2020	Solin	8	(1)
2020	Rudeš	4	(0)
2021	Kvik Halden		

International career
2009–2010	Bosnia and Herzegovina U21	6	(1)
2012	Bosnia and Herzegovina	2	(0)
2011	Bosnia and Herzegovina XI	1	(0)
- * Club domestic league appearances and goals as of 20 May 2024

Ivan Sesar (born 29 August 1989) is a Bosnian former professional footballer who played as a midfielder.

== Club career ==
=== NK Zagreb ===
Sesar made his senior debut for NK Zagreb on 31 August 2008 in a 1–1 draw against HNK Sibenik He would only play one match for the club before joining FC Koper.

=== FC Koper ===
After being released by NK Zagreb, Ivan Sesar signed for FC Koper in the Slovenian Prva Liga on 1 July 2009 as a free agent. It wouldn't be until 8 August 2009 that he would be substituted in the 77th minute in a 2–1 win against ND Gorica. Sesar also bagged his first assist for an equalising goal in a 1–1 draw against NK Domzale. Koper would win the league by 9 points with Sesar making 23 league appearances. In the subsequent season, he faced his old rivals Dinamo Zagreb in a Champions League Qualifying match losing 5–4 on aggregate.

=== Lokomotiva Zagreb ===
Sesar returned to Croatia joining Lokomotiva Zagreb on a free transfer on 1 August 2010. He netted his first career goal with Lokomotiva in a league match against Hrvatski Dragovoljac in the form of an equaliser. The match would end 3–2 in favor of Lokomotiva Zagreb.

=== Sarajevo ===
Ivan Sesar joined Premijer Liga side FK Sarajevo for free exactly a year after joining Lokomotiva Zagreb. Sesar played 34 league matches for the side in the 2010-11 and 2011-12 seasons bagging six assists. Sesko also participated in Sarajevo's UEFA Europa League qualification run making it to the third round of the tournament where he would assist another two times.

=== Elazığspor ===
About a year and a half into his time with Sarajevo, he was sent out on loan to Turkish side Elazığspor. He contributed two assists to the side in 14 appearances.

=== Akhisar Belediyespor ===
Shortly after returning from his loan spell, Ivan Sesar remained in Croatia for Akhisarspor. He assisted two more goals in Turkey before leaving the club on a free transfer.

=== Dunajská Streda ===
Sesar joined Dunajská Streda on a free transfer. He would play eight games for the side in a campaign that saw Dunajska finish in 7th.

=== Široki Brijeg ===
Sesar returned to Široki Brijeg, a club where he had spent most of his youth career. He would net a goal in a 3–0 win against relegation-battling Velez Mostar. Although having zero goal contributions in 22 league appearance in the subsequent season, Široki Brijeg would end up winning the Primijer Liga in the 2016-17 campaign.

=== Juventus București ===
He joined the newly promoted, second division side Juventus București for free on 25 July 2017. He made 16 league appearances for the club in Liga II.

=== Inter Turku ===
After a season in Romania, Sesar joined Inter Turku for an undisclosed amount. He won the 2018 Finnish Cup and finished mid-table in the 2018 campaign.

=== Voluntari ===
Ivan Sesar returned to Romania a year later, this time for first division side FC Voluntari. Voluntari would see themselves in a relegation battle in a campaign where Sesar played seven matches.

=== Tuzla City ===
Sesar then joined Bosnian side Tuzla City. He scored the winning goal in a 1–0 win versus Velez Mostar in the Kup BiH in match that would see them avoid relegation by 3 points. He also bagged four assists in the 19/20 campaign.

=== NK Solin ===
Sesar joined Croatian side NK Solin in 2020. He would assist and score against NK Croatia Zmijavci to win the game 3–1 away from home. He played eight matches in a campaign where the side would finish four points above relegation.

=== Rudeš ===
After playing only eight matches for Solin, Sesar would join NK Rudeš making four appearances.

=== Kvik Halden ===
He joined Kvik Halden in 2021 making 2 appearances. Ivan Sesar retired at the end of the 2021 campaign.

== International career ==
Sesar made his international debut for Bosnia and Herzegovina national football team in an unofficial friendly against Poland in Antalya on 16 December 2011. His official debut came on 15 August 2012 against Wales.

== Career statistics ==
=== Club ===
Club	Season	League			Cup		Continental		Total	
Club	Season	Division	Apps	Goals	Apps	Goals	Apps	Goals	Apps	Goals
Zagreb	2008-09	Prva HNL	1	—	—		—		1	—
Koper	2009-10	Slovenian PrvaLiga	23	—	3	—	2	—	28	
Koper	2010-11	Slovenian PrvaLiga	3	—	—		—		3	—
Koper	Total		26	—	3	—	2	—	31	—
Lokomotiva Zagreb	2010-11	Prva HNL	17	1	—		—		17	1
FK Sarajevo	2011-12	Bosnian Premier League	23	—	—		—		23	—
FK Sarajevo	2012-13	Bosnian Premier League	11	—	3	—	6	—	20	—
FK Sarajevo	Total		34	—	3	—	6	—	43	—
Elazığspor	2012-13	Süper Lig	14	—	—		—		14	—
Akhisarspor	2013-14	Süper Lig	12	—	8	—	—		20	
Dunajská Streda	2014-15	Slovak Super Liga	8	—	2	—	—		10	—
Siroki Brijeg	2015-16	Bosnian Premier League	25	1	4	—	—		29	1
Siroki Brijeg	2016-17	Bosnian Premier League	22	—	4	—	2	—	28	—
Siroki Brijeg	Total		47	1	2	—	2	—	57	1
Juventus Bucharest	2017-18	Liga II	16	—	2	—	—		18	
Inter Turku	2018	Veikkausliiga	13	—	8	—	—		21	—
Voluntari	2018-19	Liga I	6	—	1	—	—		7	—
Tuzla City	2018-19	Bosnian Premier League	7	—	2	1	—		7	1
Tuzla City	2019-20	Bosnian Premier League	21	—	—		—		21	—
Tuzla City	Total		28	—	2	1	—		28	1
Solin	2020-21	2. HNL	8	1	—		—		8	1
Rudeš	2020-21	2. HNL	4	—	—		—		4	—
Kvik Halden	2021	2. divisjon	1	—	1	—	—		2	—
Career Total			235	—	32	1	16	—	283	4

=== International ===
#	Date	Venue	Opponent	Result	Competition
1	16 December 2011	Mardan Sports Complex, Antalya	Poland	0–1	Friendly
2	15 August 2012	Parc y Scarlets, Llanelli	Wales	2–0	Friendly
3.	14 November 2012	Stade 5 Juillet 1962, Algiers	Algeria	1–0	Friendly

== Honours ==
Koper

- Slovenian PrvaLiga: 2009–10
- Slovenian Supercup: 2010

Široki Brijeg

- Bosnian Cup: 2016–17

FC Inter Turku

- Finnish Cup: 2017-18
