= Siniša Anđelković =

Slovenian footballer

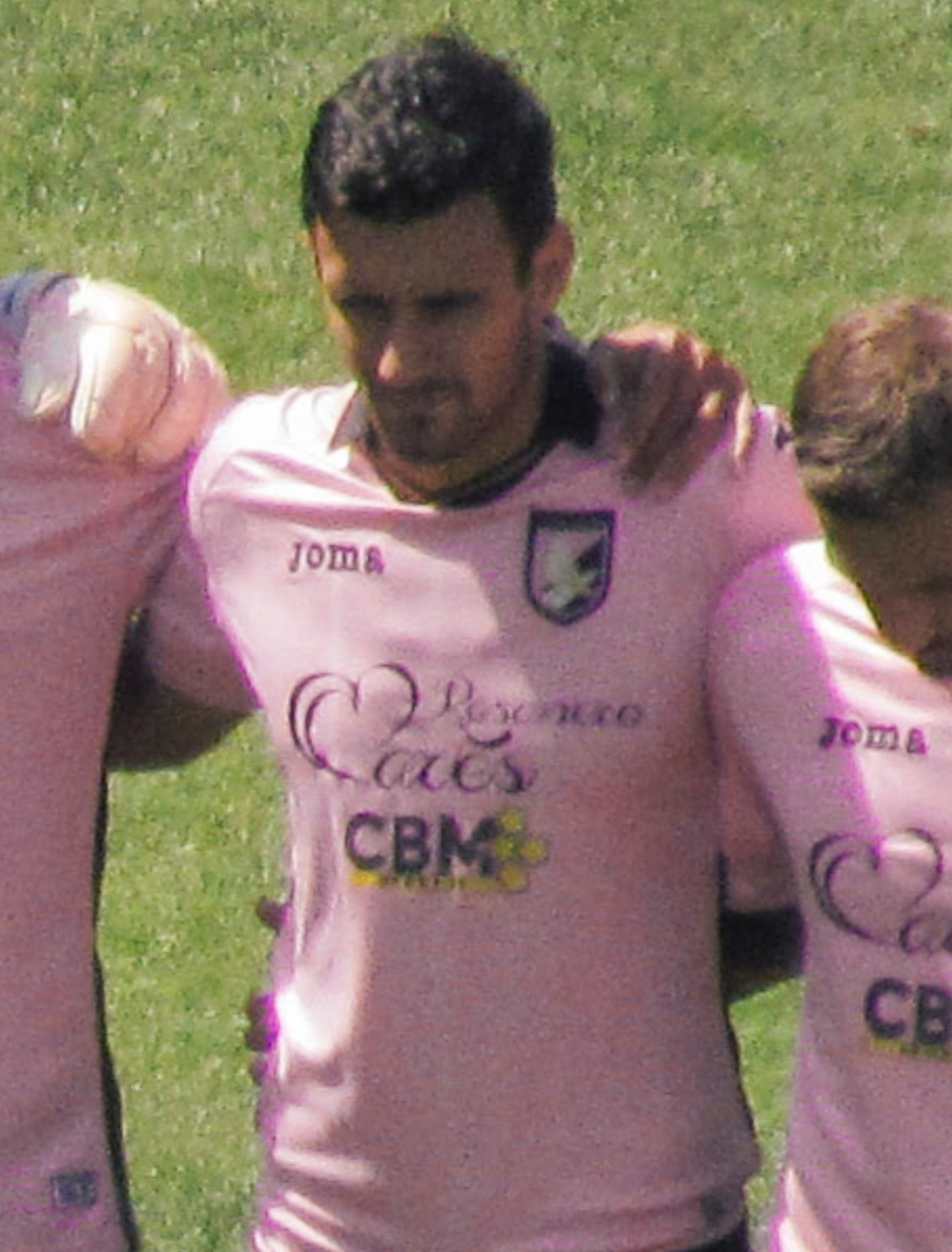

Personal information
- Date of birth: 13 February 1986 (age 40)
- Place of birth: Kranj, SFR Yugoslavia
- Height: 1.86 m (6 ft 1 in)
- Position: Centre-back

Youth career
- Triglav Kranj

Senior career*
Years	Team	Apps	(Gls)
2004–2008	Triglav Kranj	69	(3)
2008–2009	Drava Ptuj	54	(1)
2010	Maribor	31	(2)
2011–2017	Palermo	120	(1)
2011–2012	→ Ascoli (loan)	22	(1)
2012–2013	→ Modena (loan)	32	(2)
2017–2019	Venezia	40	(1)
2019–2022	Padova	54	(0)

International career
2006–2007	Slovenia U20	2	(0)
2011–2015	Slovenia	5	(0)
- * Club domestic league appearances and goals

Siniša Anđelković (born 13 February 1986) is a Slovenian football coach and former centre-back.

== Playing career ==
=== Early career in Slovenia ===
Born in Kranj, Anđelković started his career in his hometown Kranj playing at local club Triglav. In 2008, he joined Drava Ptuj, where he made his debut in the top division of Slovenian football, 1. SNL. He was a member of Drava for a season and a half and earned 54 appearances for the club in the Slovenian top flight, scoring 1 goal. During the winter transfer window of 2009–10 season he was acquired by Maribor where he soon established himself in the first team. In two seasons with Maribor, he played a total of 30 matches, scoring two goals in the 1. SNL.

=== Palermo and loans ===
In late November 2010 it was announced by Zlatko Zahovič, Maribor's sport director, that Serie A side Palermo were in advanced talks to sign Anđelković permanently. The transfer was made official on 7 December 2010. The transfer fee paid by Palermo was undisclosed, but suggested to be a record fee for a defender from 1. SNL. In Palermo's financial filing in the Chamber of Commerce of Palermo, the transfer fee was €1.2 million.

On 12 January 2011, Anđelković made his debut for Palermo, playing the whole 90 minutes in the Coppa Italia round of 16 game against Chievo; the match ended in a 1–0 win for the Sicilians.

On 16 August 2011 he moved on loan to Serie B club Ascoli. The following year he goes on loan to another Serie B club Modena. He returned to recently relegated Serie B club Palermo at the end of the season, after his Modena loan expired, ensuring immediately a place in the starting lineup alongside Ezequiel Muñoz and Claudio Terzi.

=== Padova ===
On 9 January 2019, he joined a Serie B club Padova on a 1.5-year contract. On 31 January 2022, the contract between Padova and Anđelković was terminated by mutual consent.

== International career ==
Anđelković made his senior international debut for Slovenia on 9 February 2011, appearing in a friendly game against Albania in a squad that also included Palermo teammates Armin Bačinović and Josip Iličić. The game ended in a 2–1 win for his side. He earned a total of 5 caps, scoring no goals, and his final international was a March 2015 friendly away against Qatar.

== Coaching career ==
On 19 March 2024, Anđelković joined the coaching staff of the newly-appointed manager Simone Bentivoglio at Serie C club Arzignano. Both were dismissed by the end of the 2023–24 season to make room for a new coaching staff.

== Career statistics ==
=== Club ===
As of match played 29 September 2021

Appearances and goals by club, season and competition
Club	Season	League			National cup		Continental		Other		Total	
Club	Season	Division	Apps	Goals	Apps	Goals	Apps	Goals	Apps	Goals	Apps	Goals
Drava Ptuj	2008–09	Slovenian PrvaLiga	33	1	1	0	—		1 (Note: Appearance(s) in Relegation Playoffs)	0	35	1
Drava Ptuj	2009–10	Slovenian PrvaLiga	21	0	1	0	—		—		22	0
Drava Ptuj	Total		54	1	2	0	0	0	1	0	57	1
Maribor	2009–10	Slovenian PrvaLiga	13	2	5	1	—		—		18	3
Maribor	2010–11	Slovenian PrvaLiga	18	0	2	0	6 (Note: Appearance(s) in UEFA Europa League)	1	—		26	1
Maribor	Total		31	2	7	1	6	1	0	0	44	4
Palermo	2010–11	Serie A	7	0	1	0	—		—		8	0
Palermo	2013–14	Serie B	36	1	2	0	—		—		38	1
Palermo	2014–15	Serie A	32	0	0	0	—		—		32	0
Palermo	2015–16	Serie A	23	0	1	0	—		—		24	0
Palermo	2016–17	Serie A	22	0	0	0	—		—		22	0
Palermo	Total		120	1	4	0	0	0	0	0	124	1
Ascoli (loan)	2011–12	Serie B	22	1	1	0	—		—		23	1
Modena (loan)	2012–13	Serie B	32	2	1	1	—		—		33	3
Venezia	2017–18	Serie B	32	1	0	0	—		3 (Note: Appearance(s) in Promotion Playoffs)	0	35	1
Venezia	2018–19	Serie B	8	0	1	0	—		—		9	0
Venezia	Total		40	1	1	0	0	0	3	0	44	1
Padova	2018–19	Serie B	14	0	0	0	—		—		14	0
Padova	2019–20	Serie C	17	0	1	0	—		3	0	21	0
Padova	2020–21	Serie C	21	0	2	0	—		3	0	26	0
Padova	2021–22	Serie C	1	0	1	0	—		1 (Note: Appearance(s) in Coppa Italia Serie C)	0	3	0
Padova	Total		53	0	4	0	0	0	7	0	64	0
Career total			352	8	20	2	6	1	11	0	389	11

=== International ===
As of match played 30 March 2015

Appearances and goals by national team and year
National team	Year	Apps	Goals
Slovenia	2011	2	0
Slovenia	2013	1	0
Slovenia	2014	1	0
Slovenia	2015	1	0
Total		5	0
