= Andraž Struna =

Slovenian footballer (born 1989)

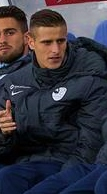

Personal information
- Date of birth: 23 April 1989 (age 37)
- Place of birth: Piran, SFR Yugoslavia
- Height: 1.85 m (6 ft 1 in)
- Position: Full-back

Youth career
- Portorož Piran

Senior career*
Years	Team	Apps	(Gls)
2006–2007	Portorož Piran		
2007–2010	Koper	58	(1)
2008	→ Jadran Dekani (loan)	21	(2)
2010–2013	Cracovia	50	(1)
2013–2016	PAS Giannina	82	(0)
2017	Heart of Midlothian	13	(1)
2017	New York City FC	5	(0)
2018–2019	Anorthosis Famagusta	38	(0)
2019–2020	Voluntari	22	(1)
2020–2021	Triestina	5	(0)
2022	Tabor Sežana	4	(0)

International career
2009–2010	Slovenia U20	3	(0)
2009–2010	Slovenia U21	5	(0)
2012–2018	Slovenia	27	(1)
- * Club domestic league appearances and goals as of 6 January 2023

Andraž Struna (born 23 April 1989) is a Slovenian footballer who plays as a full-back. He is the brother of fellow Slovenian footballer Aljaž Struna.

== Club career ==
=== Cracovia ===
In December 2010, Struna joined Cracovia on a three-and-a-half-year contract.

=== PAS Giannina ===
In summer 2013, he signed for the Super League Greece club PAS Giannina. His contract expired on 30 June 2016 without signing a new one. He had 89 appearances in all competitions.

=== Heart of Midlothian ===
On 18 January 2017, he signed for Scottish Premiership team Heart of Midlothian on a short-term deal. He was released by the club at the end of the season after failing to agree to a contract extension.

=== New York City FC ===
On 6 September 2017, Struna signed with New York City FC.

=== Voluntari ===
On 17 September 2019, Struna joined Liga I side Voluntari.

=== Triestina ===
On 8 September 2020, he signed a two-year contract with Serie C club Triestina.

== International career ==
Struna played for the Slovenia under-21 team between 2009 and 2010. He made his senior debut on 15 August 2012 in a friendly match against Romania and earned a total of 27 caps, scoring 1 goal.

== Career statistics ==
=== Club ===
As of match played 19 May 2019

Appearances and goals by club, season and competition
Club	Season	League			National cup		League cup		Continental		Other		Total	
Club	Season	Division	Apps	Goals	Apps	Goals	Apps	Goals	Apps	Goals	Apps	Goals	Apps	Goals
Koper	2007–08	PrvaLiga	1	0	0	0	—		0	0	0	0	1	0
Koper	2008–09	PrvaLiga	19	0	4	0	—		0	0	0	0	23	0
Koper	2009–10	PrvaLiga	21	1	0	0	—		0	0	0	0	21	1
Koper	2010–11	PrvaLiga	17	0	3	0	—		2 (Note: Appearances in UEFA Champions League)	0	1 (Note: Appearance in Slovenian Supercup)	0	23	0
Koper	Total		58	1	7	0	0	0	2	0	1	0	68	1
Cracovia	2010–11	Ekstraklasa	10	1	0	0	—		0	0	0	0	10	1
Cracovia	2011–12	Ekstraklasa	25	0	2	0	—		0	0	0	0	27	0
Cracovia	2012–13	I liga	15	0	1	0	—		0	0	0	0	16	0
Cracovia	Total		50	1	3	0	0	0	0	0	0	0	53	1
PAS Giannina	2013–14	Super League Greece	30	0	2	0	—		0	0	0	0	32	0
PAS Giannina	2014–15	Super League Greece	30	0	2	0	—		0	0	0	0	32	0
PAS Giannina	2015–16	Super League Greece	22	0	3	0	—		0	0	0	0	25	0
PAS Giannina	Total		82	0	7	0	—		0	0	0	0	89	0
Heart of Midlothian	2016–17	Scottish Premiership	13	1	4	0	0	0	0	0	0	0	17	1
Heart of Midlothian	Total		13	1	4	0	0	0	0	0	0	0	17	1
New York City	2017	MLS	5	0	0	0	—		0	0	2	1	7	1
Anorthosis Famagusta	2017–18	Cypriot First Division	12	0	2	0	—		0	0	0	0	14	0
Anorthosis Famagusta	2018–19	Cypriot First Division	26	0	2	0	—		0	0	0	0	28	0
Anorthosis Famagusta	Total		38	0	4	0	0	0	0	0	0	0	42	0
Career total			246	3	25	0	0	0	2	0	3	1	276	4

=== International ===
Scores and results list Slovenia's goal tally first, score column indicates score after each Struna goal.

List of international goals scored by Andraž Struna
No.	Date	Venue	Opponent	Score	Result	Competition
1	27 March 2015	Stožice Stadium, Ljubljana, Slovenia	San Marino	3–0	6–0	UEFA Euro 2016 qualifiers

== Honours ==
Koper

- Slovenian First League: 2009–10
- Supercup: 2010
