= Josip Iličić =

Slovenian footballer (born 1988)

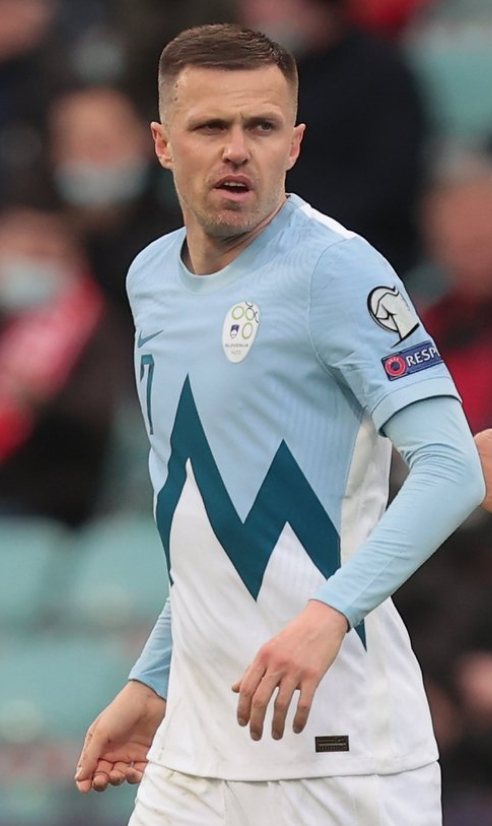
- Iličić with Slovenia in 2021

Personal information
- Full name: Josip Iličić
- Date of birth: 29 January 1988 (age 38)
- Place of birth: Prijedor, SR Bosnia and Herzegovina, SFR Yugoslavia
- Height: 1.90 m (6 ft 3 in)
- Positions: Attacking midfielder; winger

Team information
- Current team: Koper
- Number: 72

Youth career
- 1995–2006: Triglav Kranj
- 2006–2007: Britof

Senior career*
Years	Team	Apps	(Gls)
2007–2008	Bonifika	24	(3)
2008–2010	Interblock	55	(12)
2010	Maribor	5	(1)
2010–2013	Palermo	98	(20)
2013–2017	Fiorentina	105	(29)
2017–2022	Atalanta	136	(47)
2022–2025	Maribor	62	(11)
2025–	Koper	29	(10)

International career
2008–2010	Slovenia U20	4	(0)
2009–2010	Slovenia U21	6	(0)
2010–2024	Slovenia	86	(17)
- * Club domestic league appearances and goals as of 17 July 2026

Josip Iličić (Croatian pronunciation: [jǒsip ǐlitʃitɕ]; born 29 January 1988) is a Slovenian professional footballer who plays for Slovenian PrvaLiga club Koper. Primarily an attacking midfielder, he can also play as a winger or forward.

Iličić began his professional career with Slovenian club Bonifika, later also playing for Interblock and Maribor in his home country, before moving to Italy in 2010 to join Palermo. In 2013, he signed for Fiorentina, and subsequently for Atalanta in 2017. After spending twelve years in Italy, Iličić returned to Maribor in 2022.

Iličić enjoyed his best time as a professional footballer with Atalanta, scoring eleven or more league goals in each of his first three years at the club, and was awarded a spot in the 2018–19 Serie A Team of the Year. He became the first player to ever score four away goals in a UEFA Champions League knockout match, doing so against Valencia in 2020, which also made him the oldest player to score four goals at this stage of the competition.

Iličić made his senior debut for the Slovenia national team in August 2010, in a friendly match against Australia. Three years after his debut, in September 2013, he scored his first international goal against Cyprus. Overall, he earned 86 caps for Slovenia, and represented the side at UEFA Euro 2024.

== Club career ==
=== Early career ===
Born in Prijedor, SR Bosnia and Herzegovina, Iličić started his career playing in the youth teams of Triglav Kranj and later Britof. At the age of 19, he moved to SC Bonifika, where he played for a season in the Slovenian Second League. It was there when his talent was spotted by Interblock, where he stayed for two seasons playing in the Slovenian top division. At the end of the 2009–10 season, Interblock was relegated to the Second League after losing the relegation play-offs against Triglav. Despite being one of the best players of his club and one of the top prospects of Slovenian football Iličić finished the season as a reserve.

Aged 21, Iličić contemplated an idea of finishing his playing career altogether. He wanted to return to futsal, his passion, and to find a job, however, a few weeks later he received a phone call from Zlatko Zahovič, the director of football at Maribor, who proposed he should sign for the club. In a life changing decision, Iličić took the offer immediately and moved to Slovenia's second largest city, where he made a big impact from the start as he scored twice in the UEFA Europa League qualifying match against Scottish Premier League club Hibernian in July 2010. He then scored again, in the return leg of the UEFA Europa League playoff round against Sicilian Palermo, which ended in a 3–2 win for the Slovenian side. On the very next day, it was confirmed that Palermo had acquired Iličić and teammate Armin Bačinović from Maribor for a permanent move. The transfer fee paid by Palermo was undisclosed, but it was reported to be around €2.3 million.

=== Palermo ===
Iličić debuted for Palermo in the Serie A on 12 September 2010 against Brescia, replacing Giulio Migliaccio in the second half. In the next round, he was already a starter and scored his first goal for Palermo at home against reigning champions Internazionale. Only four days later, on 23 September 2010, he scored his second goal of the season, this time against another Italian giant Juventus. His good performances against top Italian teams continued when he scored a goal against Fiorentina on 3 October 2010, and against Roma on 28 November 2010.

On 20 June 2011, Iličić signed a new five-year contract. He changed his shirt number to 27 on 16 August 2011. However, in the 2011–12 season Iličić struggled to make an impact mostly due to Javier Pastore – Iličić's attacking midfield partner – being sold in a record bid to Paris Saint-Germain, and Iličić provided only two goals as a result. Despite that, he was confirmed for the 2012–13 season as well, being paired with new signing Franco Brienza in a 3–4–2–1 formation by new head coach Gian Piero Gasperini. Iličić's top moment of the season came on 24 November 2012, when he scored a winning brace in a 3–1 home win for a struggling Palermo side against Catania in the Sicilian derby.

=== Fiorentina ===
On 23 July 2013, Palermo officially confirmed the sale of Iličić to Serie A rivals Fiorentina on their website. Later, the deal was officially announced by Fiorentina on their website. The transfer fee was undisclosed, reported to be in the sum of €9 million including add-ons. He scored six goals in his first season at Fiorentina. The 2014–15 season was more successful for him, finishing as the club's top scorer with ten goals in all competitions, along with Mario Gómez.

=== Atalanta ===
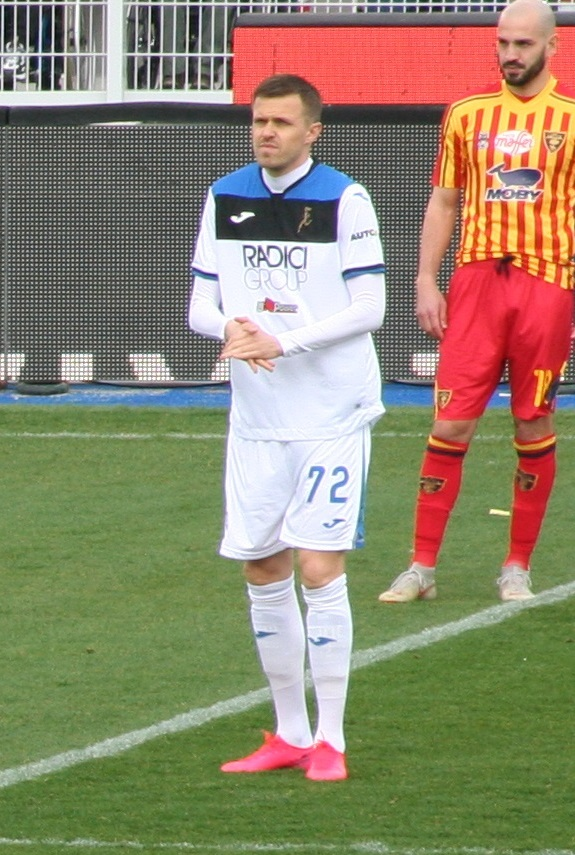
Iličić with Atalanta in 2020

On 5 July 2017, Atalanta signed Iličić from Fiorentina for a reported fee of €5.5 million after Fiorentina declined to offer him a contract extension. Iličić made an immediate impact in his first year at Atalanta, scoring 11 times in a seventh-place finish.

The following year, he scored twelve times in a historic season as Atalanta finished third in the Serie A, earning them a spot in the 2019–20 UEFA Champions League group stage for the first time. He was also awarded a spot in the 2018–19 Serie A Team of the Year along with teammate Duván Zapata.

On 25 January 2020, Iličić scored a hat-trick, which included a free kick goal from the halfway line, in a 7–0 victory over Torino. Two months later, on 10 March, he scored all four of Atalanta's goals in the 2019–20 UEFA Champions league round of 16 match against Valencia, to secure a 4–3 win and help Atalanta progress to the quarter-finals. He became the first player in the history of the competition to score four goals in an away tie of a knockout stage match, and the oldest player at the time to score four goals in a single match in the competition at the age of 32 years and 41 days, surpassing Zlatan Ibrahimović. Iličić also received UEFA's Player of the Week award after the Champions League round of 16 matches. Later in 2020, Iličić was nominated for the UEFA 50 Men's Team of the Year.

After spending five years with the club, his contract with Atalanta was terminated by mutual consent on 31 August 2022. Overall, Iličić made 173 appearances for Atalanta and scored 60 goals.

=== Return to Maribor ===
After twelve years of playing in Serie A, Iličić returned to Slovenia and joined his former club Maribor on 5 October 2022, signing a contract until June 2025. He made his second debut for Maribor a month later, on 6 November, in a 5–1 home win over Mura, where he also scored Maribor's fifth goal from the penalty spot.

=== Koper ===
In June 2025, after his contract with Maribor expired, Iličić signed for fellow Slovenian top division side Koper.

== International career ==
Iličić made his international debut with the Slovenia under-20 team in October 2008 in a match against Croatia. Overall, he made four appearances for the team, all of them in the Mirop Cup. He also played for the under-21 team between 2009 and 2010, including two appearances in the qualifiers for the 2011 UEFA European Under-21 Championship.

Iličić missed out on the 2010 FIFA World Cup but made his debut for the senior team in a friendly match against Australia on 11 August 2010. He scored his first international goal on 10 September 2013 against Cyprus.

In May 2024, Iličić was included in the preliminary squad for UEFA Euro 2024, ending his two-and-a-half years absence from the national team. The following month, he was selected in the final 26-man squad for the tournament. Iličić made his European Championship debut on 25 June, coming off the bench in the last group stage match against England, which ended in a goalless draw as Slovenia advanced from the group stage for the first time.

== Style of play ==
A predominantly left-footed player, Iličić is capable of playing as a second striker, as a wide midfielder or winger on either flank, or even in a central role as an attacking midfielder in a 4–2–3–1 or 4–3–1–2 system. His former Palermo coach, Bortolo Mutti, believed that the 4–3–3 system was the perfect formation for his characteristics, as it allowed him to be deployed on the right flank, a position from which he could cut inside and strike on goal with his stronger left foot. He has also been deployed as a central midfielder on occasion, although this is not his preferred position. During his time at Atalanta, he has often been used in a free advanced role in a fluid 3–4–3 formation under manager Gian Piero Gasperini.

A powerful and accurate striker of the ball with either foot, in particular from distance, he is highly regarded for his touch on the ball, technique, dribbling skills, and creativity, as well as his physical strength, leadership, strong personality, and instinctive play on the pitch; he is also known for his use of feints, in particular the back-heel move, and is an accurate set piece and penalty taker. While he is known for his composure, ability to find space, and eye for goal, he is also an excellent playmaker and assist provider, courtesy of his vision, crossing, and precise passing ability, in particular with the outside of his boot, which enables him to contribute to his team's offensive plays effectively by creating goalscoring chances for himself or his teammates. Moreover, he is a hard-working player, who possesses quick feet, poise, and elegance in possession, despite his tall stature, athletic build, and lack of significant pace or acceleration. Despite his talent and ability, he has been accused by certain pundits of being inconsistent at times, and has also drawn criticism over his difficult character, defensive positioning, and tactical awareness, in particular in his youth, although he was able to improve on the mental aspect of his game as he matured and his career progressed, which saw him reach his prime and maintain a consistent level of performance into his early 30s. His playing style and speed of thought has earned him the nickname Il Professore ("The Professor") in the Italian media.

== Personal life ==
Josip Iličić was born in Prijedor, present-day Bosnia and Herzegovina and moved to Kranj, present-day Slovenia when he was only one year old, together with his mother Ana and brother Igor, after his father was killed. Iličić was once asked in an interview if he would be interested in playing for Croatia national team, due to his Croatian ancestry, but he replied that he would have never accepted the offer due to the fact he had lived in Slovenia his whole life. Later, he made a similar comment regarding Bosnia and Herzegovina, the country where he was born.

In 2020 he suffered from depression due to the COVID-19 pandemic. In early 2022, Iličić suffered again from mental health problems and was absent from the Atalanta squad.

== Career statistics ==
=== Club ===
As of match played 16 May 2026

Appearances and goals by club, season and competition
Club	Season	League			National cup (Note: Includes Slovenian Cup, Coppa Italia)		Europe		Other		Total	
Club	Season	Division	Apps	Goals	Apps	Goals	Apps	Goals	Apps	Goals	Apps	Goals
Bonifika	2007–08	2. SNL	24	3	—		—		—		24	3
Interblock	2008–09	1. SNL	27	9	4	1	—		0	0	31	10
Interblock	2009–10	1. SNL	28	3	3	1	2 (Note: Appearances in UEFA Europa League)	0	2 (Note: Appearances in Slovenian PrvaLiga promotion-relegation play-offs)	0	35	4
Interblock	Total		55	12	7	2	2	0	2	0	66	14
Maribor	2010–11	1. SNL	5	1	0	0	6	3	—		11	4
Palermo	2010–11	Serie A	34	8	5	0	0	0	—		39	8
Palermo	2011–12	Serie A	33	2	1	3	2	1	—		36	6
Palermo	2012–13	Serie A	31	10	1	1	—		—		32	11
Palermo	Total		98	20	7	4	2	1	—		107	25
Fiorentina	2013–14	Serie A	21	3	2	1	8	2	—		31	6
Fiorentina	2014–15	Serie A	25	8	2	0	7	2	—		34	10
Fiorentina	2015–16	Serie A	30	13	1	0	6	2	—		37	15
Fiorentina	2016–17	Serie A	29	5	2	0	4	1	—		35	6
Fiorentina	Total		105	29	7	1	25	7	—		137	37
Atalanta	2017–18	Serie A	31	11	4	0	6	4	—		41	15
Atalanta	2018–19	Serie A	31	12	5	1	0	0	—		36	13
Atalanta	2019–20	Serie A	26	15	1	1	7 (Note: Appearances in UEFA Champions League)	5	—		34	21
Atalanta	2020–21	Serie A	28	6	4	0	6	1	—		38	7
Atalanta	2021–22	Serie A	20	3	0	0	4	1	—		24	4
Atalanta	Total		136	47	14	2	23	11	—		173	60
Maribor	2022–23	1. SNL	11	2	3	0	—		—		14	2
Maribor	2023–24	1. SNL	31	8	2	0	3 (Note: Appearances in UEFA Europa Conference League)	1	—		36	9
Maribor	2024–25	1. SNL	20	1	0	0	8 (Note: Two appearances in UEFA Europa League, six appearances and two goals in UEFA Conference League)	2	—		28	3
Maribor	Total		62	11	5	0	11	3	—		78	14
Koper	2025–26	1. SNL	28	10	0	0	3 (Note: Appearances in UEFA Conference League)	0	—		31	10
Career total			513	133	40	9	72	25	2	0	627	167

=== International ===
Appearances and goals by national team and year
National team	Year	Apps	Goals
Slovenia	2010	6	0
Slovenia	2011	8	0
Slovenia	2012	8	0
Slovenia	2013	1	1
Slovenia	2014	4	0
Slovenia	2015	8	1
Slovenia	2016	9	0
Slovenia	2017	6	3
Slovenia	2018	5	0
Slovenia	2019	10	4
Slovenia	2020	3	1
Slovenia	2021	11	6
Slovenia	2022	0	0
Slovenia	2023	0	0
Slovenia	2024	7	1
Total		86	17

Scores and results list Slovenia's goal tally first, score column indicates score after each Iličić goal.

List of international goals scored by Josip Iličić
No.	Date	Venue	Cap	Opponent	Score	Result	Competition
1	10 September 2013	GSP Stadium, Nicosia, Cyprus	23	Cyprus	2–0	2–0	2014 FIFA World Cup qualification
2	27 March 2015	Stožice Stadium, Ljubljana, Slovenia	28	San Marino	1–0	6–0	UEFA Euro 2016 qualification
3	10 June 2017	Stožice Stadium, Ljubljana, Slovenia	46	Malta	1–0	2–0	2018 FIFA World Cup qualification
4	4 September 2017	Stožice Stadium, Ljubljana, Slovenia	48	Lithuania	1–0	4–0	2018 FIFA World Cup qualification
5	4 September 2017	Stožice Stadium, Ljubljana, Slovenia	48	Lithuania	2–0	4–0	2018 FIFA World Cup qualification
6	10 June 2019	Daugava Stadium, Riga, Latvia	59	Latvia	3–0	5–0	UEFA Euro 2020 qualification
7	10 June 2019	Daugava Stadium, Riga, Latvia	59	Latvia	4–0	5–0	UEFA Euro 2020 qualification
8	10 October 2019	Toše Proeski Arena, Skopje, North Macedonia	62	North Macedonia	1–2	1–2	UEFA Euro 2020 qualification
9	19 November 2019	Stadion Narodowy, Warsaw, Poland	65	Poland	2–2	2–3	UEFA Euro 2020 qualification
10	15 November 2020	Stožice Stadium, Ljubljana, Slovenia	67	Kosovo	2–1	2–1	2020–21 UEFA Nations League C
11	27 March 2021	Fisht Olympic Stadium, Sochi, Russia	70	Russia	1–2	1–2	2022 FIFA World Cup qualification
12	4 June 2021	Bonifika Stadium, Koper, Slovenia	73	Gibraltar	2–0	6–0	Friendly
13	4 June 2021	Bonifika Stadium, Koper, Slovenia	73	Gibraltar	5–0	6–0	Friendly
14	8 October 2021	National Stadium, Ta' Qali, Malta	76	Malta	1–0	4–0	2022 FIFA World Cup qualification
15	8 October 2021	National Stadium, Ta' Qali, Malta	76	Malta	3–0	4–0	2022 FIFA World Cup qualification
16	11 October 2021	Ljudski vrt, Maribor, Slovenia	77	Russia	1–2	1–2	2022 FIFA World Cup qualification
17	4 June 2024	Stožice Stadium, Ljubljana, Slovenia	80	Armenia	2–1	2–1	Friendly

== Honours ==
Interblock

- Slovenian Cup: 2008–09
- Slovenian Supercup runner-up: 2009

Maribor

- Slovenian First League runner-up: 2023–24, 2024–25
- Slovenian Supercup runner-up: 2010

Palermo

- Coppa Italia runner-up: 2010–11

Fiorentina

- Coppa Italia runner-up: 2013–14

Atalanta

- Coppa Italia runner-up: 2018–19, 2020–21

Koper

- Slovenian First League runner-up: 2025–26

Individual

- Serie A Team of the Year: 2018–19
- Slovenian Footballer of the Year: 2019
- Slovenian First League Player of the Season: 2025–26
- Slovenian First League Player of the Month: February 2024
- Slovenian First League Team of the Season: 2023–24, 2025–26
