= Robert Berić =

Slovenian footballer

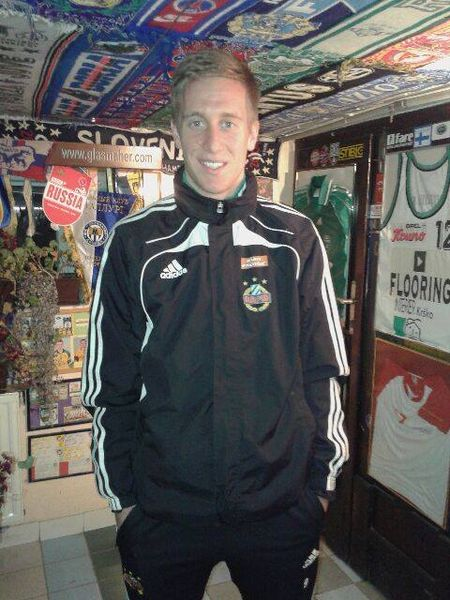
- Berić in 2015

Personal information
- Date of birth: 17 June 1991 (age 35)
- Place of birth: Krško, SR Slovenia, SFR Yugoslavia
- Height: 1.88 m (6 ft 2 in)
- Position: Striker

Team information
- Current team: Koper
- Number: 19

Youth career
- 1997–2008: Krško
- 2007: Krka
- 2008: Interblock

Senior career*
Years	Team	Apps	(Gls)
2007–2008	Krško	23	(4)
2008–2010	Interblock	34	(12)
2010–2013	Maribor	90	(27)
2013–2014	Sturm Graz	35	(10)
2014–2015	Rapid Wien	38	(30)
2015–2020	Saint-Étienne	81	(26)
2016	Saint-Étienne II	1	(1)
2017	→ Anderlecht (loan)	6	(0)
2020–2021	Chicago Fire	56	(20)
2022–2023	Tianjin Jinmen Tiger	54	(14)
2024–2025	Changchun Yatai	42	(15)
2026–	Koper	6	(3)

International career
2006–2007	Slovenia U16	7	(2)
2007–2008	Slovenia U17	11	(4)
2008–2009	Slovenia U19	7	(1)
2010–2012	Slovenia U21	13	(4)
2012–2019	Slovenia	25	(2)
- * Club domestic league appearances and goals as of 13 November 2026

Robert Berić (born 17 June 1991) is a Slovenian professional footballer who plays as a striker for Slovenian PrvaLiga club Koper. In the 2014–15 season, he ranked 11th in the European Golden Shoe award.

== Club career ==
Berić began his career at the age of five in Krško youth teams before being promoted to their main squad in the 2007–08 season. In 2008, he signed for Interblock. He made his debut at Interblock as a substitute in a 2–1 away victory over Drava Ptuj. He scored his first goal for the club in a 3–0 win over Primorje on 7 December 2008. In total, he played 34 games for Interblock in the Slovenian first division, scoring 12 goals.

In August 2010, Berić joined Maribor together with his teammate Josip Iličić, signing a four-year contract.

In June 2013, he moved to Sturm Graz for a reported fee of €1 million. In the 2013–14 season, he amassed 10 goals and 11 assists.

In 2014, he left Sturm Graz for league rivals Rapid Wien. The transfer fee was estimated at between €700,000 and 800,000. In his first season, he became the league's second best goalscorer with 27 goals in 33 appearances, which earned him 11th place in the European Golden Shoe award.

=== Saint-Étienne ===
On 31 August 2015, Berić joined Saint-Étienne on a four-year deal while the transfer fee paid to Rapid Wien was reported as €6 or 7.5 million. He quickly established himself in the starting lineup and began scoring goals for the club in both the Ligue 1 and the UEFA Europa League campaigns. However, on 8 November 2015 during an away Ligue 1 match against Lyon, Berić suffered a knee injury which sidelined him for the rest of the season. During his time at Saint-Étienne, Berić received the nickname "Terminator".

On 30 August 2017, Berić joined Anderlecht on a one-year loan.

Saint-Étienne recalled Berić from his loan spell at Anderlecht on 1 January 2018.

On 22 April 2018, Berić came off the bench at the start of the second half and scored twice as Saint-Étienne came from behind to beat Troyes 2–1 in a home Ligue 1 match.

On 18 May 2019, Berić scored twice as Saint-Étienne defeated Nice 3–0 in a home Ligue 1 match to secure a top-four finish and qualification for the 2019–20 UEFA Europa League.

=== Chicago Fire ===
On 18 January 2020, Major League Soccer club Chicago Fire announced that it had acquired Berić via a transfer deal from Saint-Étienne, and that he had signed for the club as a Designated Player. Berić scored in his debut against Seattle Sounders FC, but Chicago lost 2–1.

Following the 2021 season, Berić had his contract option declined by Chicago and left the club.

=== Tianjin Jinmen Tiger ===
In April 2022, Berić signed with Chinese Super League club Tianjin Jinmen Tiger.

=== Changchun Yatai ===
In February 2024, Berić joined fellow Chinese Super League club Changchun Yatai. On 1 March, he made his debut and scored his first goal for Yatai in a 4–2 away defeat against Shandong Taishan. On 2 January 2026, Berić announced his departure after the 2025 season.

== International career ==
Berić made his debut for Slovenia in a November 2012 friendly match away against Macedonia and earned a total of 25 caps, scoring 2 goals. His final international was an October 2019 European Championship qualification match against Austria.

== Career statistics ==
=== Club ===
As of 14 June 2025

Appearances and goals by club, season and competition
Club	Season	League			National cup		League cup		Other		Total	
Club	Season	Division	Apps	Goals	Apps	Goals	Apps	Goals	Apps	Goals	Apps	Goals
Krško	2007–08	Slovenian Second League	15	3	1	2	—		—		16	5
Krško	2008–09	Slovenian Second League	8	1	1	1	—		—		9	2
Krško	Total		23	4	2	3	—		—		25	7
Interblock	2008–09	Slovenian PrvaLiga	20	8	4	2	—		0	0	24	10
Interblock	2009–10	Slovenian PrvaLiga	14	4	2	0	—		2 (Note: Appearance(s) in Slovenian PrvaLiga relegation play-offs)	0	18	4
Interblock	Total		34	12	6	2	—		2	0	42	14
Maribor	2010–11	Slovenian PrvaLiga	30	8	4	1	—		1 (Note: Appearance(s) in UEFA Europa League)	0	35	9
Maribor	2011–12	Slovenian PrvaLiga	28	6	4	1	—		12 (Note: Four appearances and a goal in UEFA Champions League, seven appearances in UEFA Europa League, and one appearance in Slovenian Supercup)	1	44	8
Maribor	2012–13	Slovenian PrvaLiga	32	13	6	1	—		13 (Note: Six appearances and three goals in UEFA Champions League, six appearances and three goals in UEFA Europa League, and one appearance in Slovenian Supercup)	6	51	20
Maribor	Total		90	27	14	3	—		26	7	130	37
Sturm Graz	2013–14	Austrian Bundesliga	35	10	5	2	—		2	0	42	12
Rapid Wien	2014–15	Austrian Bundesliga	33	27	4	0	—		2	0	39	27
Rapid Wien	2015–16	Austrian Bundesliga	5	3	1	1	—		4 (Note: Appearance(s) in UEFA Champions League)	2	10	6
Rapid Wien	Total		38	30	5	1	—		6	2	49	33
Saint-Étienne	2015–16	Ligue 1	10	3	0	0	0	0	3	2	13	5
Saint-Étienne	2016–17	Ligue 1	22	6	0	0	1	0	9	3	32	9
Saint-Étienne	2017–18	Ligue 1	15	7	1	1	0	0	—		16	8
Saint-Étienne	2018–19	Ligue 1	23	9	1	1	1	1	—		25	11
Saint-Étienne	2019–20	Ligue 1	11	1	0	0	1	0	6	0	18	1
Saint-Étienne	Total		81	26	2	2	3	1	18	5	104	34
Saint-Étienne II	2015–16	CFA 2	1	1	—		—		—		1	1
Anderlecht (loan)	2017–18	Belgian First Division A	6	0	0	0	—		0	0	6	0
Chicago Fire	2020	Major League Soccer	23	12	—		—		—		23	12
Chicago Fire	2021	Major League Soccer	33	8	—		—		—		33	8
Chicago Fire	Total		56	20	—		—		—		56	20
Tianjin Jinmen Tiger	2022	Chinese Super League	26	4	0	0	—		—		26	4
Tianjin Jinmen Tiger	2023	Chinese Super League	28	10	2	0	—		—		30	10
Tianjin Jinmen Tiger	Total		54	14	2	0	—		—		56	14
Changchun Yatai	2024	Chinese Super League	28	13	1	1	—		—		29	14
Changchun Yatai	2025	Chinese Super League	14	2	1	0	—		—		15	2
Changchun Yatai	Total		42	15	2	1	—		—		44	16
Career total			460	159	38	14	3	1	54	14	555	188

=== International ===
Appearances and goals by national team and year
National team	Year	Apps	Goals
Slovenia	2012	1	0
Slovenia	2013	2	0
Slovenia	2014	1	0
Slovenia	2015	5	1
Slovenia	2016	3	0
Slovenia	2017	2	0
Slovenia	2018	5	1
Slovenia	2019	6	0
Total		25	2

Scores and results list Slovenia's goal tally first, score column indicates score after each Berić goal.

List of international goals scored by Robert Berić
No.	Date	Venue	Opponent	Score	Result	Competition
1	8 September 2015	Ljudski vrt, Maribor, Slovenia	Estonia	1–0	1–0	UEFA Euro 2016 qualification
2	9 September 2018	GSP Stadium, Nicosia, Cyprus	Cyprus	1–0	1–2	2018–19 UEFA Nations League C
