= Ermin Hasić =

Slovenian footballer

Personal information
- Full name: Ermin Hasić
- Date of birth: 19 May 1975 (age 51)
- Place of birth: Koper, SFR Yugoslavia
- Height: 1.87 m (6 ft 1 1/2 in)
- Position: Goalkeeper

Senior career*
Years	Team	Apps	(Gls)
1991–2004	Koper	152	(0)
1994–1995	→ Dekani (loan)	10	(0)
2004	Olimpija	13	(0)
2005–2006	SpVgg Unterhaching	2	(0)
2006–2015	Koper	169	(7)
2018	Koper	0	(0)
- * Club domestic league appearances and goals

Ermin Hasić (born 19 May 1975) is a Bosnian-Slovenian retired footballer of Bosnian descent who played as a goalkeeper.

== Honours ==
Koper

- Slovenian Championship: 2009–10
- Slovenian Cup: 2006–07, 2014–15
- Slovenian Supercup: 2010
