= Aleš Mertelj =

Slovenian footballer

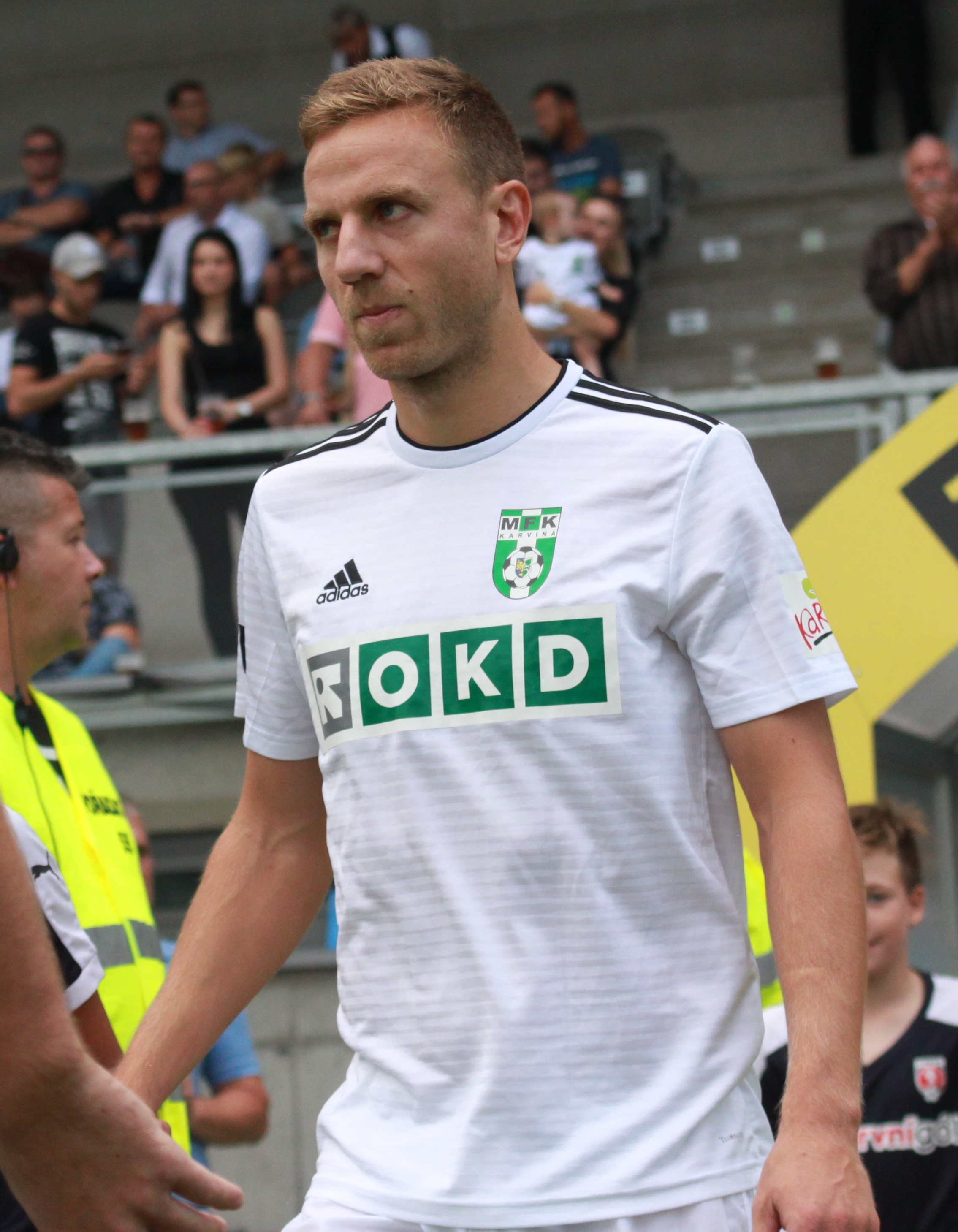
- Mertelj with MFK Karviná in 2018

Personal information
- Date of birth: 22 March 1987 (age 39)
- Place of birth: Kranj, SFR Yugoslavia
- Height: 1.83 m (6 ft 0 in)
- Position: Midfielder

Youth career
- –2006: Triglav Kranj

Senior career*
Years	Team	Apps	(Gls)
2006–2008	Triglav Kranj	50	(2)
2008–2009	Koper	35	(3)
2009–2018	Maribor	207	(7)
2018	MFK Karviná	13	(0)
2019–2020	Triglav Kranj	40	(1)
2021	SV Wildon	0	(0)

International career
2007	Slovenia U20	1	(0)
2012–2015	Slovenia	16	(0)
- * Club domestic league appearances and goals

Aleš Mertelj (born 22 March 1987) is a retired Slovenian footballer who played as a midfielder.

== Club career ==
Mertelj started his career playing for Triglav Kranj and stayed there until he was acquired by Slovenian top division club, Koper. He played for Koper during the 2008–09 season, making 35 league appearances for the club and scoring three goals in the process. In 2009, he transferred to Maribor, where he stayed for nine years, winning 14 trophies with the club.

== International career ==
Mertelj made his international debut for Slovenia on 26 May 2012 in a friendly match against Greece, coming in as a late substitute. He earned a total of 16 caps, scoring no goals.

== Personal life ==
Mertelj was born in Kranj in the northwestern Slovenia and has one brother and one sister. His older brother Sandi is a professional waterpolo player.

== Honours ==
Maribor

- Slovenian PrvaLiga: 2010–11, 2011–12, 2012–13, 2013–14, 2014–15, 2016–17
- Slovenian Cup: 2009–10, 2011–12, 2012–13, 2015–16
- Slovenian Supercup: 2009, 2012, 2013, 2014
