= Gabriel (footballer, born 1984) =

Brazilian footballer

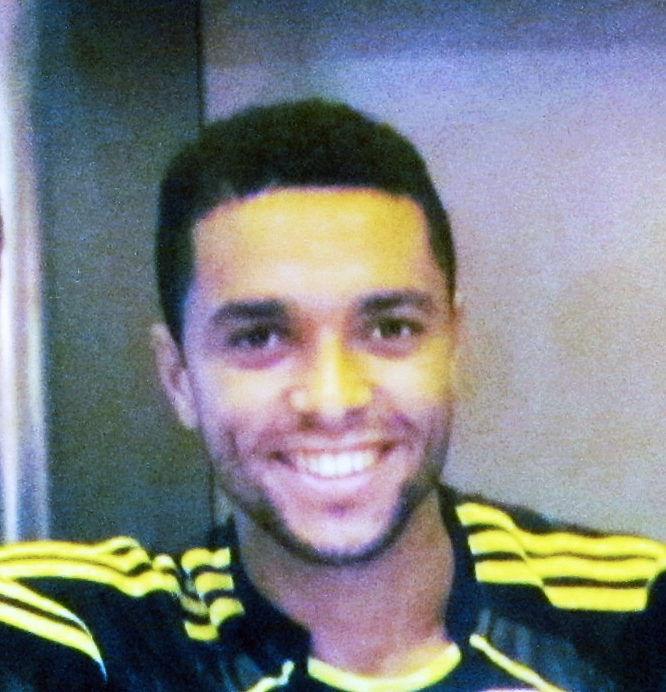

Personal information
- Full name: João Gabriel da Silva
- Date of birth: 4 July 1984 (age 42)
- Place of birth: Boa Esperança, Minas Gerais, Brazil
- Height: 1.75 m (5 ft 9 in)
- Position: Midfielder

Senior career*
Years	Team	Apps	(Gls)
2005	CE Passense		
2005−2006	Solin		
2006−2008	Šibenik	51	(4)
2008	Primorje	17	(2)
2009	Drava Ptuj	14	(4)
2009–2010	Olimpija Ljubljana	27	(5)
2010–2012	Maribor	9	(0)
2011–2012	→ Nafta Lendava (loan)	27	(4)
2012–2013	Valletta	30	(5)
2013–2014	Qormi	13	(2)
2014–2015	Pietà Hotspurs	29	(2)
2015–2016	UFC Jennersdorf	15	(4)
2016	SV Anger	13	(1)
2016–2017	TUS Heiligenkreuz	26	(6)
2017	USC Sonnhofen	10	(0)
- * Club domestic league appearances and goals

João Gabriel da Silva (born 4 July 1984) is a retired Brazilian football midfielder.
