= Marko Pridigar =

Slovenian footballer

Personal information
- Date of birth: 18 May 1985 (age 41)
- Place of birth: Maribor, SFR Yugoslavia
- Height: 1.88 m (6 ft 2 in)
- Position: Goalkeeper

Youth career
- Železničar Maribor
- –2004: Maribor

Senior career*
Years	Team	Apps	(Gls)
2004–2014	Maribor	117	(0)
2005	→ Paloma (loan)	8	(0)
2006	→ Aluminij (loan)	8	(0)
2015	Zavrč	7	(0)
2015–2016	Ayia Napa	13	(0)
2016	Fylkir	6	(0)
2017–2019	Rudar Velenje	55	(0)
Total		214	(0)

International career
2004	Slovenia U19	1	(0)
2005	Slovenia U20	2	(0)
2005–2006	Slovenia U21	3	(0)
- * Club domestic league appearances and goals

Marko Pridigar (born 18 May 1985) is a Slovenian retired footballer who played as a goalkeeper.

== Club career ==
Pridigar started his career in the youth ranks of Maribor, where he also signed his first professional contract. He made his debut in the Slovenian PrvaLiga at the age of 20 in a match against Nafta Lendava. During his first years as a professional, he was competing for the place in the first team with Marko Ranilović. He was the first-choice goalkeeper during the 2007–08 and 2008–09 seasons as he played most of the league matches at that time. In the next season (2009–10) he lost his place in the starting eleven to Ranilović and played a total of eleven matches in the first league. During this period, he was also injured for a couple of months.

He was the first-choice goalkeeper at Maribor at the beginning of the 2010–11 season. However, he suffered another injury halfway through the first part of the season and was sidelined again. At the beginning of the second part of the season, Pridigar returned to the team, but was injured again in the first match after his return against Olimpija, when an opponent player stepped on his hand and fractured the bone in his palm in three different places. Pridigar was operated on 17 March 2011, and was sidelined for the rest of the season.
