= Marcos Tavares =

Brazilian footballer

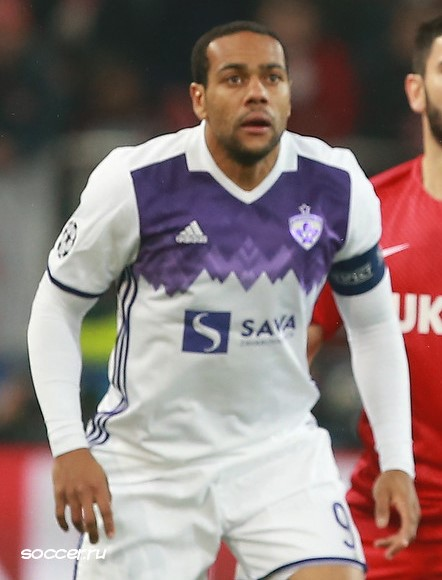
- Tavares with Maribor in 2017

Personal information
- Full name: Marcos Magno Morales Tavares
- Date of birth: 30 March 1984 (age 42)
- Place of birth: Porto Alegre, Brazil
- Height: 1.76 m (5 ft 9 in)
- Position: Striker

Youth career
- 1993–1997: Internacional
- 1997–2002: Grêmio

Senior career*
Years	Team	Apps	(Gls)
2003	Grêmio	1	(0)
2004	Kedah		(11)
2005	Atlético Paranaense	0	(0)
2005–2006	Kedah		(14)
2006–2007	Porto Alegre		
2007	APOEL	5	(0)
2008–2022	Maribor	436	(159)

International career
- Brazil U17
- Brazil U20
- * Club domestic league appearances and goals

Marcos Magno Morales Tavares (born 30 March 1984) is a Brazilian former professional footballer who played as a striker. Tavares spent 15 seasons with Slovenian team Maribor, and is the club's all-time most capped player and top goalscorer. He is also the all-time top goalscorer of Slovenian top division with 159 goals.

At international level, Tavares was part of the Brazilian youth national teams from under-17 to under-20.

== Early life ==
Tavares was born in Porto Alegre and spent his childhood in the city's slums with his father, a worker at Internacional, and his mother, a teacher. He is the youngest of three children and throughout his youth the family was living in poverty, sharing a one bedroom home where all five family members were sleeping in the same room and on the floor. Tavares claims he started playing football to help his family, and after spending a few years at Internacional youth selections, he was noticed by their city rivals Grêmio at the age of 13 and accepted their financial offer to switch clubs as he wanted to provide the financial means for his father to build a bigger home. However, Internacional and Grêmio are fierce city rivals who contest the Grenal derby and his father soon enough found himself unemployed.

== Club career ==
=== Early career ===
Tavares has maintained that he was unable to manage the conflict between professional and personal life during his teenage years, and that his excessive partying, drinking and overall lack of discipline contributed to his failure to succeed in Brazil. At the age of 19 he went to Malaysia in desire for quick implementation. In the 2004 season, he played for Kedah in the Malaysian Super League, where he scored eleven league goals. When the season ended, Tavares returned to Brazil, where he signed a two-year contract with Atlético Paranaense in February 2005. However, he featured in only two games, both in Campeonato Paranaense, before being released by the club in May 2005.

After that, he once again continued his career in Kedah, where he was the team's top goalscorer in the 2005–06 Malaysia Premier League with twelve goals. After one season with Kedah, he was noticed by Roberto de Assis Moreira, who took him to Porto Alegre.

In 2007, Tavares moved to Europe as he signed for Cypriot side APOEL. He scored four goals in the Cypriot Cup, but in the Cypriot League he played only five matches without scoring any goals. Because he didn't perform as the club expected, Tavares was released from APOEL in January 2008.

=== Maribor ===
While playing for APOEL, Tavares met Nilton Fernandes, who introduced him to Zlatko Zahovič, the director of football at the Slovenian team Maribor. Tavares joined the team at their winter training camp in Croatia, and debuted in a friendly game against Šibenik. He signed a contract with Maribor on 29 January 2008. Tavares made his official competitive debut on 1 March 2008 against Koper in the 21st round of the 2007–08 Slovenian PrvaLiga season.

Tavares soon established himself in the team and among the fans. In the next season, he won the Slovenian championship with Maribor, the club's first title in six years. He was the league's second best goalscorer with 15 goals, and was voted the best player of the season. Tavares also received the Guest Star 2008 award, which is awarded to the best foreign sportsperson in Slovenia. In the 2009–10 season, he scored 10 goals in 34 league matches. In addition, he scored five goals in five cup matches, helping Maribor to win the 2009–10 Slovenian Cup. In October 2009, Tavares became the team captain after Zoran Pavlović left the club.

In September 2010, he signed a new contract with Maribor until 2013. In the 2010–11 season, he won the league title with Maribor and was crowned as the best league goalscorer with 16 goals. In addition, he was the club's best assist provider with 15 assists. For his performances during the course of the season, he was voted as the most valuable player by the Slovenian PrvaLiga players. He was also selected as the most distinguished player of the season by the fans of Maribor.

In July 2012, Tavares scored his tenth goal for Maribor in UEFA competitions in a match against Željezničar Sarajevo, becoming the club's all-time top scorer in UEFA competitions. The next month, he signed a new five-year contract with Maribor.

In December 2012, Tavares was again selected as the most distinguished player of the previous season by the fans of Maribor, winning his second "Purple Warrior" trophy. He was officially announced as the winner during the half-time of the UEFA Europa League game against Lazio on 6 December, where he later scored his 14th goal in European competitions. In May 2013, he was voted, alongside Nikola Nikezić and Enis Đurković, as the best striker of the 2012–13 Slovenian PrvaLiga season. He scored 17 goals in the 2012–13 PrvaLiga season, becoming the league top goalscorer for the second time in three years. On 31 July 2013, Tavares scored against his former team, APOEL, in the 2013–14 UEFA Champions League third qualifying round.

On 26 April 2014, Tavares scored his 117th goal for Maribor in a league match against Koper, tying with Branko Horjak as the club's all-time top goalscorer. On 7 May 2014 he became the sole record holder when he scored two second-half goals in a 4–0 away win against Krka. On 26 August 2014, he scored the only goal of the match in a 1–0 win over Celtic in the UEFA Champions League play-off round, helping Maribor to qualify for the group stage of the competition for the first time since 1999.

On 22 April 2017, Tavares set a record for the fastest goal scored in the Slovenian top division as he scored after eight seconds in a match against Domžale. On 16 August 2017, Tavares scored in a 2–1 defeat against Hapoel Be'er-Sheva in the Champions League play-off round, which was the crucial away goal as Maribor won the second leg 1–0 and qualified for the group stages. On 25 November 2017, Tavares scored his 130th goal in the Slovenian top division, tying himself with Štefan Škaper as the all-time top goalscorer in the Slovenian PrvaLiga. On 2 December 2017, he became the sole record holder after scoring the winning goal against Gorica in a 2–1 victory. A few days later, on 6 December 2017, Tavares scored his first goal in the group stages of the UEFA Champions League in a 1–1 home draw against Sevilla. On 25 August 2019, he scored his 200th goal for Maribor in all competitions during a league game against Bravo.

In May 2022, Tavares retired from professional football after spending 15 seasons with Maribor. In his last home game against Aluminij on 14 May 2022, he played together with his son, Marcos Tavares Jr. (born 2004), who made his senior debut in the last minutes of the game, thus fulfilling Tavares's longstanding wish to play one match with his son. Before the match, the club retired his number 9 jersey, and also renamed the West Stand of Ljudski vrt to Marcos Tavares Stand in his honour.

== Personal life ==
Tavares met his wife Leticia at the age of 17. The pair has four children together. He is multilingual, speaking three languages; Portuguese, Slovene and English. In Maribor, he and his wife founded a humanitarian and religious society Kairos which is responsible for helping the people in need. He is also a minister.

Tavares gained Slovenian citizenship on 16 September 2013 after residing in the country for more than five years.

== Career statistics ==
Appearances and goals by club, season and competition
Club	Season	League			National cup (Note: Includes Malaysia Cup, Cypriot Cup, Slovenian Cup)		Continental		Other		Total	
Club	Season	Division	Apps	Goals	Apps	Goals	Apps	Goals	Apps	Goals	Apps	Goals
Grêmio	2003	Campeonato Brasileiro Série A	1	0	0	0	1 (Note: Appearance in Copa Libertadores)	0	1 (Note: Appearance in Campeonato Gaúcho)	0	3	0
Kedah	2004	Malaysia Super League		11		7 (Note: Seven goals in Malaysia Cup)	—			3 (Note: Three goals in Malaysia FA Cup)		21
Atlético Paranaense	2005	Campeonato Brasileiro Série A	0	0	0	0	0	0	2 (Note: Appearances in Campeonato Paranaense)	0	2	0
Kedah	2005	Malaysia Premier League		2		4 (Note: Four goals in Malaysia Cup)	—		—			6
Kedah	2005–06	Malaysia Premier League		12			—		—			12
APOEL	2007–08	Cypriot First Division	5	0	4	4	2 (Note: Appearances in UEFA Champions League)	0	1 (Note: Appearance in Cypriot Super Cup)	0	12	4
Maribor	2007–08	Slovenian PrvaLiga	12	4	2	0	—		—		14	4
Maribor	2008–09	Slovenian PrvaLiga	35	15	4	5	—		—		39	20
Maribor	2009–10	Slovenian PrvaLiga	34	10	5	5	6 (Note: Four appearances and three goals in UEFA Champions League, two appearances in UEFA Europa League)	3	1 (Note: Appearances in Slovenian Supercup)	0	46	18
Maribor	2010–11	Slovenian PrvaLiga	33	16	6	1	6 (Note: Appearances in UEFA Europa League)	4	1	0	46	21
Maribor	2011–12	Slovenian PrvaLiga	31	10	6	1	11 (Note: Four appearances and two goals in UEFA Champions League, seven appearances in UEFA Europa League)	2	1	0	49	13
Maribor	2012–13	Slovenian PrvaLiga	29	17	6	4	12 (Note: Six appearances and three goals in UEFA Champions League, six appearances and two goals in UEFA Europa League)	5	1	0	48	26
Maribor	2013–14	Slovenian PrvaLiga	34	13	5	0	12 (Note: Six appearances and one goal in UEFA Champions League, six appearances and two goals in UEFA Europa League)	3	1	1	52	17
Maribor	2014–15	Slovenian PrvaLiga	34	17	3	1	12	1	0	0	49	19
Maribor	2015–16	Slovenian PrvaLiga	33	12	4	1	2	0	1	0	40	13
Maribor	2016–17	Slovenian PrvaLiga	33	9	5	0	6	3	—		44	12
Maribor	2017–18	Slovenian PrvaLiga	32	17	3	0	12	5	—		47	22
Maribor	2018–19	Slovenian PrvaLiga	32	9	5	1	6	2	—		43	12
Maribor	2019–20	Slovenian PrvaLiga	31	6	1	0	8 (Note: Six appearances and two goals in UEFA Champions League, two appearances and one goal in UEFA Europa League)	3	—		40	9
Maribor	2020–21	Slovenian PrvaLiga	25	2	2	1	1	0	—		28	3
Maribor	2021–22	Slovenian PrvaLiga	8	2	0	0	0	0	—		8	2
Maribor	Total		436	159	57	20	94	31	6	1	593	211
Career total			442+	184	61+	38	97	31	10	1	610+ (Note: Kedah appearances are missing.)	254

== Honours ==
Kedah

- Malaysia Premier League: 2005–06

Maribor

- Slovenian PrvaLiga: 2008–09, 2010–11, 2011–12, 2012–13, 2013–14, 2014–15, 2016–17, 2018–19, 2021–22
- Slovenian Cup: 2009–10, 2011–12, 2012–13, 2015–16
- Slovenian Supercup: 2009, 2012, 2013, 2014

Brazil U17

- South American U-17 Championship: 2001

Individual

- Slovenian PrvaLiga top scorer: 2010–11, 2012–13, 2014–15
- Slovenian PrvaLiga Player of the Year: 2008–09, 2010–11
- Slovenian PrvaLiga best XI: 2008–09, 2010–11, 2012–13, 2014–15, 2017–18
- Maribor Player of the Year: 2011, 2012, 2013, 2014, 2015, 2017
