= Aleš Mejač =

Slovenian footballer

Personal information
- Full name: Aleš Mejač
- Date of birth: 18 March 1983 (age 43)
- Place of birth: Kranj, SFR Yugoslavia
- Height: 1.80 m (5 ft 11 in)
- Position: Defender

Youth career
- –2001: Triglav Kranj

Senior career*
Years	Team	Apps	(Gls)
2001–2002	Triglav Kranj	16	(2)
2002	Portorož Piran	1	(0)
2002–2003	Koper	16	(0)
2003–2005	Mura	48	(4)
2005–2006	Bela Krajina	12	(7)
2006–2008	Koper	50	(4)
2008–2017	Maribor	136	(1)
2016	→ Rijeka (loan)	2	(0)
Total		281	(18)

International career
2000–2001	Slovenia U17	5	(3)
2001	Slovenia U18	10	(1)
2001	Slovenia U19	1	(0)
2002–2003	Slovenia U20	6	(1)
2002–2004	Slovenia U21	12	(3)
2008–2009	Slovenia	5	(0)
- * Club domestic league appearances and goals

Aleš Mejač (born 18 March 1983) is a Slovenian retired footballer who played as a defender.

== Honours ==
=== Koper ===
- Slovenian Cup: 2006–07

=== Maribor ===
- Slovenian PrvaLiga (6): 2008–09, 2010–11, 2011–12, 2012–13, 2013–14, 2014–15
- Slovenian Cup (3): 2009–10, 2011–12, 2012–13
- Slovenian Supercup (4): 2009, 2012, 2013, 2014
