= Kristijan Brčić =

Croatian footballer

Personal information
- Full name: Kristijan Brčić
- Date of birth: 17 July 1987 (age 39)
- Place of birth: Zagreb, SR Croatia, SFR Yugoslavia
- Height: 1.81 m (5 ft 11 in)
- Position: Midfielder

Youth career
- NK Zagreb
- –2005: Dinamo Zagreb

Senior career*
Years	Team	Apps	(Gls)
2005–2007	Lučko	34	(2)
2007–2009	Inter Zaprešić	7	(1)
2008	→ Lučko (loan)	12	(1)
2008	→ Maksimir (loan)	14	(1)
2009	→ Nacional (loan)	0	(0)
2010	Trnje Zagreb	11	(6)
2010	Rudeš	1	(0)
2010–2012	Trnje Zagreb	7	(1)
2012–2013	Dinamo Odranski Obrež		
2013	Güssing	14	(0)
2014–2015	Dinamo Odranski Obrež		
2015–2016	Lučko	15	(2)
2016	Zagorec		
2016–2018	Kurilovec		
2018–2020	Jarun Zagreb		

International career
2006–2007	Croatia U-19	9	(1)
- * Club domestic league appearances and goals

Kristijan Brčić (born 17 July 1987 in Zagreb) is a Croatian footballer who last played for Jarun Zagreb.

== Club career ==
On 3 February 2009, Portuguese club Nacional signed Brčić on loan from Inter Zaprešić. He later had a spell in Austria with SV Güssing.
