= Bernard Stjepanović =

Slovenian footballer

Personal information
- Full name: Bernard Stjepanović
- Date of birth: 22 December 1988 (age 37)
- Position: Defensive midfielder

Youth career
- 2002–2007: Triglav Kranj

Senior career*
Years	Team	Apps	(Gls)
2007–2012	Triglav Kranj	96	(6)
2007	→ Šenčur (loan)	10	(1)
2012–2013	Šenčur	10	(0)
2013	Triglav Kranj	16	(1)
2014–2020	FC Obdach	109	(27)
- * Club domestic league appearances and goals as of 11 July 2018

Bernard Stjepanović (born 22 December 1988) is a Slovenian football midfielder.
