= SC Bonifika =

Bonifika
- Full name: Sport Club Bonifika
- Founded: 2004; 21 years ago
- Dissolved: 2009; 16 years ago
- Ground: Rajko Štolfa Stadium
Home colours	Away colours

Sport Club Bonifika, commonly referred to as SC Bonifika or simply Bonifika, was a Slovenian football club. It has played in Koper until 2007, when it moved to Izola, intending to merge with MNK Izola. In the spring part of the 2008–09 season, the club moved to Sežana, but soon withdrew from the competition and ceased all operations.

== Honours ==
- Slovenian Third League
  - Winners: 2005–06
- Littoral League (fourth tier)
  - Winners: 2004–05
