= Davor Bubanja =

Slovenian footballer

Personal information
- Full name: Davor Bubanja
- Date of birth: 26 September 1987 (age 39)
- Place of birth: Kranj, SFR Yugoslavia
- Height: 1.79 m (5 ft 10 1/2 in)
- Position: Forward

Youth career
- Zarica Kranj
- Triglav Kranj
- Britof

Senior career*
Years	Team	Apps	(Gls)
2005–2006	Zarica Kranj	5	(1)
2006–2007	Šenčur	27	(4)
2007–2009	Olimpija Ljubljana	42	(23)
2010–2012	Koper	59	(9)
2012–2013	Triglav Kranj	35	(6)
2014	Sava Kranj	7	(2)
2014	Spittal/Drau	7	(2)
2015–2016	Sava Kranj	21	(8)
- * Club domestic league appearances and goals

Davor Bubanja (born 26 September 1987) is a retired Slovenian footballer who played as a forward.

== Career ==
Bubanja was released by Triglav in November 2013 due to financial issues and later had a short stint with Austrian 4th-tier side Spittal/Drau.
