= Dalibor Volaš =

Slovenian footballer

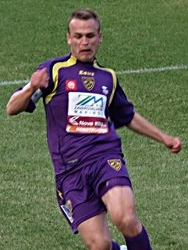
- Volaš with Maribor in 2008

Personal information
- Date of birth: 27 February 1987 (age 39)
- Place of birth: Koper, SFR Yugoslavia
- Height: 1.88 m (6 ft 2 in)
- Position: Forward

Team information
- Current team: Vesna

Youth career
- –2006: Koper

Senior career*
Years	Team	Apps	(Gls)
2005–2007	Koper	45	(13)
2006–2007	→ Bonifika (loan)	17	(14)
2007–2010	Maribor	62	(20)
2009–2010	→ Nafta Lendava (loan)	26	(11)
2011–2012	Sheriff Tiraspol	12	(4)
2011–2012	→ Maribor (loan)	34	(17)
2012–2013	Mordovia Saransk	6	(0)
2013–2014	Debrecen	26	(8)
2015	Maribor	18	(10)
2016	Pahang	12	(6)
2016	Partizani Tirana	0	(0)
2016–2017	Celje	28	(15)
2017	Sparta Rotterdam	4	(0)
2017	Sparta Rotterdam II	2	(1)
2018	GKS Katowice	8	(1)
2018–2019	Krško	28	(6)
2019–2021	Kras Repen	24	(35)
2021	Cjarlins Muzane	10	(3)
2021–2022	Kras Repen	15	(10)
2022	Sevegliano		
2023–2024	Virtus Corno		
2024–2026	Sistiana Sesljan		
2026–	Vesna		

International career
2007	Slovenia U20	1	(0)
2007–2008	Slovenia U21	5	(0)
- * Club domestic league appearances and goals

Dalibor Volaš (born 27 February 1987) is a Slovenian footballer who plays as a forward for Italian club Vesna.

== Club career ==
Volaš left Slovenian giants Maribor for Malaysian outfit Pahang in January 2016. He then joined Eredivisie side Sparta Rotterdam in summer 2017, only to leave them in February 2018 for Polish side GKS Katowice.

== Honours ==
Koper

- Slovenian Cup: 2005–06

Maribor

- Slovenian PrvaLiga: 2008–09, 2011–12, 2014–15
- Slovenian Cup: 2011–12
- Slovenian Supercup: 2009

Debrecen

- Nemzeti Bajnokság I: 2013–14
