= David Bunderla =

Slovenian footballer (born 1987)

Personal information
- Date of birth: 31 July 1987 (age 39)
- Place of birth: Kranj, SFR Yugoslavia
- Height: 1.85 m (6 ft 1 in)
- Position: Forward

Team information
- Current team: SV St. Margareten/Ros.
- Number: 11

Youth career
- Triglav Kranj
- Britof

Senior career*
Years	Team	Apps	(Gls)
2006–2008	Primorje	60	(20)
2008–2010	Maribor	38	(1)
2011	Koper	14	(0)
2011	Triglav Kranj	12	(0)
2012–2013	Šenčur	35	(10)
2013	SG-Steinfeld	14	(8)
2014	SG Drautal	27	(15)
2015	SV Greifenburg	14	(5)
2015–2019	DSG Sele/Zell	101	(47)
2019–2020	SF Rückersdorf	14	(7)
2020–2021	Zarica Kranj	9	(3)
2024–	SV St. Margareten/Ros.	25	(9)

International career
2007	Slovenia U20	1	(0)
2007	Slovenia U21	3	(0)
- * Club domestic league appearances and goals as of 20 April 2025

David Bunderla (born 31 July 1987) is a Slovenian footballer who plays as a forward for Austrian club SV St. Margareten/Ros.

He played in the Slovenian top division, Slovenian PrvaLiga, for Primorje, Maribor, Koper and Triglav Kranj.

== Honours ==
Maribor

- Slovenian PrvaLiga: 2008–09
- Slovenian Cup: 2009–10
- Slovenian Supercup: 2009
