= Armin Bačinović =

Slovenian footballer

Personal information
- Date of birth: 24 October 1989 (age 37)
- Place of birth: Maribor, SFR Yugoslavia
- Height: 1.83 m (6 ft 0 in)
- Position: Midfielder

Youth career
- Železničar Maribor
- 2002–2008: Maribor

Senior career*
Years	Team	Apps	(Gls)
2007–2010	Maribor	79	(6)
2010–2014	Palermo	54	(2)
2012–2013	→ Verona (loan)	17	(1)
2014–2016	Virtus Lanciano	58	(2)
2016–2017	Ternana	12	(0)
2017–2018	Sambenedettese	39	(2)
Total		259	(13)

International career
2007	Slovenia U18	2	(0)
2007	Slovenia U19	4	(0)
2008–2009	Slovenia U20	6	(2)
2008–2010	Slovenia U21	10	(1)
2009–2013	Slovenia	13	(0)
- * Club domestic league appearances and goals

Armin Bačinović (born 24 October 1989) is a Slovenian former professional footballer who played as a midfielder.

== Club career ==
=== Early career in Slovenia ===
Bačinović started his career at Železničar Maribor and was later transferred to NK Maribor youth sides. He signed his first professional contract in 2007. Bačinović made his first team debut on 7 July 2007 as a late substitute in an Intertoto Cup tie with Hajduk Kula. His first start came later that season in Slovenian PrvaLiga match, a 1–1 draw with Nafta Lendava.

On 14 August 2010, he made his 100th appearance for Maribor.

=== Palermo and loans ===
On 27 August 2010, it was confirmed that Palermo had acquired Bačinović and teammate Josip Iličić from Maribor in a permanent move; the move was finalized the very next day after Palermo had eliminated Maribor from the 2010–11 UEFA Europa League in a 5–3 aggregate win, which was also the latest appearance for both players in purple jersey. Despite his young age and lack of experience in Italian football, Bačinović immediately established himself as a key player in the Sicilians' midfield line in a 4–3–2–1 scheme together with Antonio Nocerino and Giulio Migliaccio, and scored his first goal for Palermo on 17 October 2010 against Bologna.

On 20 June 2011, he signed a new five-year contract with Palermo.

In July 2012, Palermo loaned Bačinović to Serie B club Verona. He played only a handful games during the season and left Verona by the end of the season to come back at Palermo. After a disappointing first half of season at Palermo, he was deemed surplus to requirements and excluded from the squad list after the club failed to sell him during the 2014 winter transfer window.

=== Virtus Lanciano ===
On 21 August 2014, it was confirmed Bačinović had mutually rescinded his contract with Palermo, thus ending a four-year spell with the Sicilians. Later on the same day, Serie B club Virtus Lanciano announced to have signed him as a free transfer on a three-year deal.

=== Ternana and Sambenedettese ===
After finding himself without a club following the cancellation of Virtus Lanciano, on 19 August 2016 Bačinović agreed a one-year contract with another Serie B club, Ternana.

On 31 January 2017, he left Ternana to accept a permanent deal with Lega Pro club Sambenedettese Sambenedettese terminated his contract in May 2018 after a dispute with the player.

== International career ==
Bačinović made 10 appearances for Slovenia U21 and scored one goal.

On 12 August 2009, he made his full international debut for Slovenia at Ljudski vrt, Maribor in a 2010 FIFA World Cup qualification match against San Marino, coming on as a 74th-minute substitute for Aleksandar Radosavljević, and earned a total of 13 caps, scoring no goals. His final international was a February 2013 friendly match against Bosnia and Herzegovina.

== Career statistics ==
As of 30 December 2012

Club performance			League		Cup		Continental		Total	
Season	Club	League	Apps	Goals	Apps	Goals	Apps	Goals	Apps	Goals
2007–08	Maribor	PrvaLiga	22	2	3	0	1	0	26	2
2008–09	Maribor	PrvaLiga	26	1	3	0	—		29	1
2009–10	Maribor	PrvaLiga	28	3	4	0	5	0	37	3
2010–11	Maribor	PrvaLiga	3	0	0	0	6	0	9	0
Total	Slovenia		79	6	10	0	12	0	101	6
2010–11	Palermo	Serie A	33	2	2	0	0	0	35	2
2011–12	Palermo	Serie A	13	0	0	0	1	0	14	0
2012–13	Verona	Serie B	17	1	3	0	0	0	20	1
Total	Italy		63	3	5	0	1	0	69	3
Career total			142	9	15	0	13	0	170	9

== See also ==
- Slovenian international players
- List of NK Maribor players
