= Kristijan Polovanec =

Croatian footballer

Personal information
- Date of birth: 10 October 1979 (age 47)
- Place of birth: Zagreb, SR Croatia, SFR Yugoslavia
- Height: 1.80 m (5 ft 11 in)
- Position: Defender

Youth career
- Dinamo Zagreb

Senior career*
| Years | Team | Apps | (Gls) |
| 1998–2003 | Dinamo Zagreb | 65 | (1) |
| 1998–1999 | → Croatia Sesvete (loan) | | |
| 1999–2000 | → Segesta (loan) | | |
| 2000 | → Istra (loan) | 13 | (2) |
| 2003–2004 | Varteks | 22 | (0) |
| 2004 | Croatia Sesvete | | |
| 2005 | Međimurje | 14 | (1) |
| 2005 | Inter Zaprešić | 14 | (0) |
| 2006 | Žilina | 7 | (0) |
| 2006–2008 | Libourne Saint-Seurin | 40 | (2) |
| 2008–2009 | Croatia Sesvete | 13 | (1) |
| 2009–2011 | Koper | 37 | (6) |
| 2011– | Radnik Sesvete | | |

International career^{‡}
| 1995–1996 | Croatia U17 | 7 | (0) |
| 1997–1998 | Croatia U19 | 4 | (0) |
| 1999 | Croatia U20 | 2 | (0) |
| 1999–2001 | Croatia U21 | 5 | (0) |
- * Club domestic league appearances and goals as of 21:28, 16 December 2009 (UTC) ‡ National team caps and goals as of 21:28, 16 December 2009 (UTC)

Kristijan Polovanec (born 10 October 1979) is a Croatian retired footballer who last played for NK Radnik Sesvete.

== Club career ==
Polovanec previously played for Dinamo Zagreb, Istra, Varteks, Međimurje, Inter Zaprešić in the Croatian Prva HNL and with Slovenian club Koper.

He played two seasons with Libourne-Saint-Seurin in the French Ligue 2.
