= Dragan Jelić =

Slovenian footballer

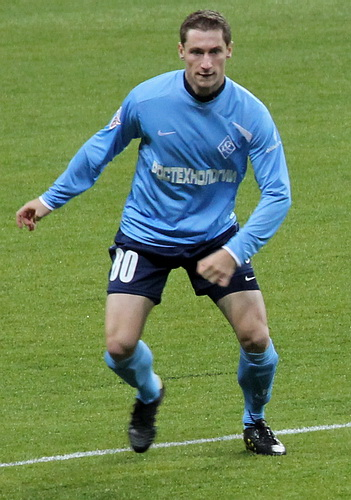

Personal information
- Date of birth: 27 February 1986 (age 40)
- Place of birth: Maribor, SFR Yugoslavia
- Height: 1.80 m (5 ft 11 in)
- Position: Forward

Youth career
- –2004: Maribor

Senior career*
Years	Team	Apps	(Gls)
2003–2006	Maribor	58	(14)
2006–2007	Çaykur Rizespor	12	(0)
2007–2012	Maribor	98	(29)
2010	→ Krylia Sovetov (loan)	6	(0)
2011	→ Willem II (loan)	5	(0)
2012	Mura 05	34	(8)
2013–2014	Kapfenberger SV	29	(2)
2013	→ Kapfenberger SV II	5	(3)
2014	Radnički Niš	6	(0)
2014–2015	Rudar Velenje	29	(9)
2015	Chojniczanka Chojnice	11	(1)
2016–2017	ASK Voitsberg	38	(15)
2017–2018	SV Gralla	29	(13)
Total		360	(94)

International career
2001	Slovenia U15	5	(4)
2004	Slovenia U18	1	(0)
2004–2007	Slovenia U20	4	(0)
2006–2007	Slovenia U21	9	(0)
- * Club domestic league appearances and goals

Dragan Jelić (born 27 February 1986) is a Slovenian former professional footballer who played as a forward.

== Club career ==
Jelić started his career in the youth teams of Maribor where he signed his first professional contract. For a short period of time he also played for Çaykur Rizespor in the Turkish Super Lig before he returned home to Maribor. His best season at the club was 2009–10 when he scored 15 goals in the 1. SNL and was the best club goalscorer of the season. In the first half of 2011 he played for Willem II on loan, returning to Maribor in summer 2011, where he stayed until February 2012.

During the winter break of the 2013–14 season, he left Austrian side Kapfenberger SV and joined Serbian top division side Radnički Niš.
