= 2010–11 Slovenian PrvaLiga =

Slovenian PrvaLiga
- Season: 2010–11
- Champions: Maribor (9th title)
- Relegated: Primorje
- Champions League: Maribor
- Europa League: Domžale (cup winners); Koper; Olimpija
- Matches: 180
- Goals: 504 (2.8 per match)
- Best player: Marcos Tavares
- Top goalscorer: Marcos Tavares (16 goals)
- Biggest home win: Maribor 5–0 Triglav; Rudar 5–0 Triglav
- Biggest away win: Primorje 0–6 Rudar; Gorica 0-6 Maribor
- Highest scoring: Koper 7–3 Celje
- Longest winning run: 5 games Maribor
- Longest unbeaten run: 20 games Maribor
- Longest winless run: 12 games Nafta
- Longest losing run: 5 games Triglav; Nafta; Primorje
- Highest attendance: 11,000; Maribor 2–0 Domžale
- Lowest attendance: 50; Koper 2–1 Rudar
- Total attendance: 217,830
- Average attendance: 1,210

The 2010–11 Slovenian PrvaLiga was the 20th season of top-tier football in Slovenia. The season began in July 2010 and ended on 29 May 2011. Koper were the defending champions, having won their first the previous season.

== Teams ==
Location of teams in the 2010–11 Slovenian PrvaLiga

Drava were directly relegated at the end of the 2009–10 season to Slovenian Second League after the last-place finish, having narrowly avoided relegation in the relegation play-offs in the 2007–08 and 2008–09 seasons. Interblock, who placed ninth in 2009–10, entered relegation play-offs and were beaten by Triglav, the runners-up of the 2009–10 Slovenian Second League.

Along with Triglav, Primorje were promoted back to top flight as champions of the Slovenian Second League, having been relegated at the end of the 2008–09 season.

=== Team summaries ===
Club	City / Town	Stadium	Capacity	Kit maker
Celje	Celje	Arena Petrol	13,059	Joma
Domžale	Domžale	Domžale Sports Park	3,100	Legea
Gorica	Nova Gorica	Nova Gorica Sports Park	3,100	Joma
Koper	Koper	Bonifika Stadium	4,010	Lotto
Maribor	Maribor	Ljudski vrt	12,702	Zeus
Nafta	Lendava	Lendava Sports Park	2,000	Le Coq Sportif
Olimpija	Ljubljana	Stožice Stadium	16,038	Puma
Primorje	Ajdovščina	Ajdovščina Football Stadium	1,630	Uhlsport
Rudar	Velenje	Ob Jezeru City Stadium	2,341	Joma
Triglav	Kranj	Stanko Mlakar Stadium	2,060	Legea

== League table ==
Pos	Team	Pld	W	D	L	GF	GA	GD	Pts	Qualification or relegation
1	Maribor (C)	36	21	12	3	65	25	+40	75	Qualification to Champions League second qualifying round
2	Domžale	36	20	7	9	57	35	+22	67	Qualification to Europa League second qualifying round (Note: Winners of 2010–11 Slovenian Football Cup competition.)
3	Koper	36	17	9	10	57	43	+14	60	Qualification to Europa League first qualifying round
4	Olimpija	36	15	10	11	59	43	+16	55	Qualification to Europa League first qualifying round
5	Gorica	36	13	9	14	42	53	−11	48	
6	Rudar	36	12	10	14	55	47	+8	46	
7	Triglav Kranj	36	10	9	17	38	59	−21	39	
8	Celje	36	9	10	17	41	55	−14	37 (Note: CEL: 5 pts, 7–6; NAF: 5 pts, 6–7)	
9	Nafta	36	10	7	19	47	67	−20	37	Relegation play-offs cancelled
10	Primorje (R)	36	8	7	21	40	74	−34	31	Relegation to Slovenian Second League

Source: PrvaLiga (in Slovene)
Rules for classification: 1) points; 2) head-to-head points; 3) head-to-head goal difference; 4) head-to-head goals scored; 5) goal difference; 6) number of goals scored.
(C) Champions; (R) Relegated

=== Relegation play-offs ===
The ninth-placed team of the PrvaLiga, Nafta, was supposed to play a two-legged relegation play-off against the runners-up of the 2010–11 Slovenian Second League, Interblock, but they declined promotion and the play-offs were cancelled.

== Results ==
Every team plays four times against their opponents, twice at home and twice on the road, for a total of 36 matches.

=== First half of the season ===
Home \ Away	CEL	DOM	GOR	KOP	MAR	NAF	OLI	PRI	RUD	TRI
Celje		0–1	1–0	2–1	0–4	2–4	1–1	3–0	5–1	1–1
Domžale	1–0		1–0	2–0	0–1	1–1	2–1	4–1	2–3	3–0
Gorica	3–3	0–3		2–2	0–2	1–0	2–2	3–2	1–1	2–1
Koper	7–3	2–0	1–0		0–1	0–3	2–0	4–1	2–1	1–1
Maribor	2–0	1–1	3–1	2–0		3–1	0–0	1–1	3–1	5–0
Nafta	2–2	3–2	3–0	0–2	0–2		2–3	2–1	3–3	2–1
Olimpija	1–0	0–1	0–0	1–2	0–1	0–1		3–0	1–3	1–0
Primorje	2–0	0–0	0–2	3–1	0–0	4–2	5–1		1–1	0–3
Rudar	3–2	0–1	1–2	2–1	0–0	0–0	1–1	3–1		5–0
Triglav Kranj	1–1	1–3	2–0	0–0	2–2	2–0	0–5	3–2	1–0	

Source: PrvaLiga (in Slovene)
Legend: Blue = home team win; Yellow = draw; Red = away team win.

=== Second half of the season ===
Home \ Away	CEL	DOM	GOR	KOP	MAR	NAF	OLI	PRI	RUD	TRI
Celje		0–0	3–1	0–3	0–0	3–0	1–3	2–3	1–0	2–0
Domžale	2–0		2–0	1–2	2–2	3–2	3–0	1–0	2–0	3–1
Gorica	1–1	2–1		0–0	0–6	1–0	1–3	4–1	0–0	1–0
Koper	1–0	3–1	2–2		3–0	4–1	2–1	2–1	3–3	0–1
Maribor	2–0	2–0	1–2	1–1		0–1	2–2	2–0	2–1	3–1
Nafta	0–0	2–3	1–4	2–1	1–1		1–2	1–2	1–2	1–1
Olimpija	3–1	0–0	1–0	4–0	0–0	2–0		5–0	2–2	1–3
Primorje	0–1	0–0	2–3	1–1	1–2	1–4	2–2		0–6	1–0
Rudar	1–0	3–1	0–1	0–1	2–4	4–0	1–3	0–1		0–0
Triglav Kranj	0–0	2–4	1–0	0–0	1–2	4–0	1–4	2–0	1–4	

Source: PrvaLiga (in Slovene)
Legend: Blue = home team win; Yellow = draw; Red = away team win.

== Statistics ==
=== Top goalscorers ===
Source: PrvaLiga, Soccerway

Rank	Player	Club	Goals
1	(Brazil) Marcos Tavares	Maribor	16
2	(Slovenia) Milan Osterc	Koper	13
2	(Slovenia) Damir Pekič	Domžale	13
4	(Slovenia) Vedran Vinko	Nafta	10
4	(Slovenia) Vito Plut	Gorica/Maribor	10
4	(Slovenia) Etien Velikonja	Maribor/Gorica	10
7	(North Macedonia) Dragan Čadikovski	Rudar	9
7	(Slovenia) Dejan Burgar	Triglav	9
9	(Slovenia) Davor Škerjanc	Olimpija	8
9	(Slovenia) Robert Berič	Maribor	8
9	(Slovenia) Adnan Bešić	Olimpija	8
9	(Slovenia) Elvis Bratanovič	Rudar	8

=== Average attendances ===
Rank	Club	Total attendance	Matches played	Average
1	Maribor	64,600	18	3,589
2	Olimpija Ljubljana	41,900	18	2,328
3	Rudar Velenje	26,000	18	1,444
4	Nafta Lendava	18,500	18	1,028
5	Koper	16,350	18	908
6	Celje	12,700	18	706
7	Domžale	12,350	18	686
8	Gorica	9,080	18	504
9	Primorje	8,200	18	456
10	Triglav	8,150	18	453

== See also ==
- 2010 Slovenian Supercup
- 2010–11 Slovenian Football Cup
- 2010–11 Slovenian Second League
