= 2009–10 Slovenian PrvaLiga =

Slovenian PrvaLiga
- Season: 2009–10
- Champions: Koper (1st title)
- Relegated: Drava; Interblock
- Champions League: Koper
- Europa League: Maribor (cup winners); Gorica; Olimpija
- Matches played: 180
- Goals scored: 512 (2.84 per match)
- Best Player: Miran Pavlin
- Top goalscorer: Milan Osterc (23 goals)
- Biggest home win: Olimpija 5–0 Gorica
- Biggest away win: Interblock 0–5 Gorica; Interblock 0–5 Koper
- Highest scoring: Nafta 5–2 Rudar
- Longest winning run: 5 games Nafta; Gorica
- Longest unbeaten run: 15 games Koper
- Longest winless run: 12 games Gorica
- Longest losing run: 7 games Gorica
- Highest attendance: 6,000; Maribor 1–0 Olimpija
- Lowest attendance: 0 Maribor 2–1 Gorica
- Total attendance: 152,600
- Average attendance: 847

The 2009–10 Slovenian PrvaLiga was the 19th season of top-tier football in Slovenia. The season began on 18 July 2009 and ended on 16 May 2010. Koper won the league for the first time.

== Teams ==
Location of teams in the 2009–10 Slovenian PrvaLiga

Primorje were relegated to the Slovenian Second League after the last-place finish in 2008–09, thus ending their sixteen-year spell in Slovenia's highest division. Drava Ptuj successfully avoided relegation for the second year in a row by beating Second League runners-up Aluminij in the relegation play-offs.

Promoted to the Slovenia's top football league were the Second League champions Olimpija, who were promoted from the lowest tier of Slovenian football to the top league in only four seasons.

=== Team summaries ===
Club	Location	Stadium	Capacity	Kit maker
Celje	Celje	Arena Petrol	13,059	Joma
Domžale	Domžale	Domžale Sports Park	3,100	Legea
Drava Ptuj	Ptuj	Ptuj City Stadium	2,200	Fotex
Gorica	Nova Gorica	Nova Gorica Sports Park	3,100	Joma
Interblock	Ljubljana	ŽŠD Ljubljana Stadium	3,986	Adidas
Koper	Koper	Bonifika Stadium	4,500	Nike, Inc.
Maribor	Maribor	Ljudski vrt	12,435	Zeus
Nafta	Lendava	Lendava Sports Park	2,000	Le Coq Sportif
Olimpija	Ljubljana	ŽŠD Ljubljana Stadium	3,986	Diadora
Rudar	Velenje	Ob Jezeru City Stadium	2,500	Joma

== League table ==
Pos	Team	Pld	W	D	L	GF	GA	GD	Pts	Qualification or relegation
1	Koper (C)	36	21	10	5	59	35	+24	73	Qualification to Champions League second qualifying round
2	Maribor	36	18	8	10	58	44	+14	62	Qualification to Europa League second qualifying round (Note: Maribor were the winners of the 2009–10 Slovenian Football Cup and qualified for the second qualifying round of the UEFA Europa League as cup winners.)
3	Gorica	36	16	7	13	74	60	+14	55	Qualification to Europa League second qualifying round
4	Olimpija (Note: Olimpija have been deducted two points for missing a game in the Slovenian Second League.)	36	16	7	13	51	33	+18	53	Qualification to Europa League first qualifying round
5	Celje	36	14	9	13	53	56	−3	51	
6	Nafta	36	14	7	15	51	53	−2	49 (Note: NAF: 9 pts, 8–4; RUD: 3 pts, 4–8)	
7	Rudar	36	15	4	17	46	52	−6	49	
8	Domžale	36	12	9	15	51	59	−8	45	
9	Interblock (R)	36	9	6	21	35	64	−29	33	Qualification to relegation play-offs
10	Drava Ptuj (R)	36	7	9	20	34	56	−22	30	Relegation to Slovenian Second League

Source: PrvaLiga (in Slovene)
Rules for classification: 1) points; 2) head-to-head points; 3) head-to-head goal difference; 4) head-to-head goals scored; 5) goal difference; 6) number of goals scored.
(C) Champions; (R) Relegated

=== Relegation play-offs ===
The ninth-placed team of the PrvaLiga, Interblock, played a two-legged relegation play-off against the runners-up of the 2009–10 Slovenian Second League, Triglav, for a spot in the 2010–11 PrvaLiga.

23 May 2010
17:00 CEST

Interblock	0–1	Triglav Kranj
	Report	Dolžan 63'

ŽŠD Stadium, Ljubljana
Attendance: 1,000
Referee: Peter Šart
30 May 2010
17:00 CEST

Triglav Kranj	3–0	Interblock
Mišič 59'; Burgar 72'; Dolžan 74'	Report

Stanko Mlakar Stadium, Kranj
Attendance: 1,800
Referee: Damir Skomina

Triglav Kranj won 4–0 on aggregate.

== Results ==
Every team plays four times against their opponents, twice at home and twice on the road, for a total of 36 matches.

=== First half of the season ===
Home \ Away	CEL	DOM	DRA	GOR	INT	KOP	MAR	NAF	OLI	RUD
Celje		2–3	1–0	2–0	3–1	0–1	2–1	2–2	1–1	0–4
Domžale	1–5		2–2	1–4	1–0	1–1	1–3	2–1	1–2	2–0
Drava Ptuj	0–1	2–1		1–1	1–1	1–3	0–2	1–2	0–3	1–0
Gorica	1–1	1–1	1–2		4–3	1–2	2–3	3–1	1–2	1–3
Interblock	1–2	0–0	2–1	3–1		0–1	2–1	1–1	0–1	3–1
Koper	1–0	0–1	0–0	1–1	2–1		1–3	3–1	2–1	2–2
Maribor	3–3	1–2	2–2	0–1	1–0	1–2		3–1	1–0	0–2
Nafta	2–2	2–2	3–1	2–1	0–1	3–1	2–4		1–0	5–2
Olimpija	4–2	3–1	3–0	1–1	1–3	0–1	0–1	2–0		0–1
Rudar	2–0	4–1	0–3	0–3	2–1	2–2	1–0	2–0	0–3	

Source: PrvaLiga (in Slovene)
Legend: Blue = home team win; Yellow = draw; Red = away team win.

=== Second half of the season ===
Home \ Away	CEL	DOM	DRA	GOR	INT	KOP	MAR	NAF	OLI	RUD
Celje		1–0	3–0	1–4	5–1	1–3	0–2	3–2	1–0	0–0
Domžale	2–2		2–0	2–3	2–1	0–1	2–3	3–1	1–2	1–1
Drava Ptuj	0–1	2–1		2–4	3–1	1–1	0–1	0–0	0–0	0–1
Gorica	3–0	2–3	2–1		6–1	1–2	3–3	3–1	1–1	2–1
Interblock	0–0	2–1	0–2	0–5		0–5	0–1	1–1	2–1	0–1
Koper	4–0	1–3	1–1	3–2	0–0		0–0	2–0	1–0	2–1
Maribor	1–1	1–1	3–2	3–1	1–0	2–2		1–2	2–1	0–1
Nafta	2–1	2–0	1–0	0–1	3–1	1–2	3–1		0–1	2–0
Olimpija	1–3	1–1	2–0	5–0	2–0	3–1	1–1	0–0		0–1
Rudar	3–1	0–2	4–2	2–3	1–2	0–2	0–2	0–1	1–3	

Source: PrvaLiga (in Slovene)
Legend: Blue = home team win; Yellow = draw; Red = away team win.

== Top goalscorers ==
Source: PrvaLiga.si (in Slovene)

Rank	Player	Club	Goals
1	(Slovenia) Milan Osterc	Gorica	23
2	(Slovenia) Dragan Jelić	Maribor	15
3	(Slovenia) Mitja Brulc	Koper	12
3	(Slovenia) Dalibor Volaš	Nafta	12
5	(Slovenia) Dalibor Radujko	Koper	11
5	(Slovenia) Miran Pavlin	Koper	11
5	(Slovenia) Goran Cvijanović	Gorica	11
8	(Brazil) Marcos Tavares	Maribor	10
8	(Slovenia) Slaviša Dvorančič	Celje	10
8	(Croatia) Ivan Brečević	Gorica	10

== See also ==
- 2009 Slovenian Supercup
- 2009–10 Slovenian Football Cup
- 2009–10 Slovenian Second League
