= 2011–12 NK Maribor season =

NK Maribor
2011–12 season
- President: Drago Cotar
- Head Coach: Darko Milanič
- Stadium: Ljudski vrt
- Slovenian League: Winners
- Slovenian Cup: Winners
- Slovenian Supercup: Runners-up
- Champions League: Third qualifying round
- Europa League: Group stage
- Top goalscorer: League: Dalibor Volaš (17); All: Dalibor Volaš (24)
- Highest home attendance: 12,500 vs Olimpija (30 October 2011)
- Lowest home attendance: 1,000 vs Triglav (2 October 2011) and vs Gorica (23 November 2011)
- Average home league attendance: 3,800
Home colours	Away colours

The 2011–12 season was the 52nd season in the history of NK Maribor and the club's 21st consecutive season in the Slovenian PrvaLiga since the league establishment in 1991. The team participated in the Slovenian PrvaLiga, Slovenian Football Cup, UEFA Champions League, and UEFA Europa League. The season covers the period from 1 June 2011 to 31 May 2012. Darko Milanič was a head coach of the club.

The 2011–12 season was one of the most successful in history of the club as Maribor won the domestic double, having won the league and cup title. In addition, Maribor became the first Slovenian club that qualified to the UEFA Europa League. They have also finished the season as runners-up of the 2011 Slovenian Supercup.

== Supercup ==
The 2011 Slovenian Supercup was the seventh edition of the Slovenian Supercup, an annual football match contested by the winners of the previous season's Slovenian PrvaLiga and Slovenian Cup competitions. The match was played on 8 July 2011, in Ljudski vrt stadium between 2010–11 Slovenian PrvaLiga winners Maribor and 2010–11 Slovenian Football Cup winners Domžale. Both teams contested for their second Supercup title. The match was played by the best two teams of the 2010–11 season. During the course of that season Maribor was a league champion with Domžale being the only serious contender through most of the season, eventually finishing as runners up. The two teams were the only ones in the league that earned 20 or more victories, with Maribor achieving 21 and Domžale 20. In addition, both teams were part of the Slovenian cup final, held on Stožice stadium in Ljubljana and won by Domžale with the score 4–3 after regulation. The match is arguably one of the best cup finals ever held, since the competition was first introduced during the 1991–92 season.

Domžale won the 2011 Slovenian Supercup with the score 2–1 after regulation and became the most successful team in history of the competition as the only club with more than one victory. This was the second consecutive victory for Domžale over Maribor in domestic cup finals in five weeks, after winning the Slovenian cup in May 2011. Controversies arose at the end of the match as Zlatko Zahovič, Maribor's director of football, publicly stated that Maribor was not allowed to win and was disappointed with some of the main referee's decisions in second half, especially the one in 82nd minute when a clear penalty was not ruled in favour of his club. Maribor later made an official press statement expressing their concerns with the referees regarding the club's upcoming league season.

8 July 2011 Final	Maribor	1–2	Domžale	Maribor
20:45 CET	Ibraimi 59'; Vidović (yellow card) 90+3'	Report	Juninho 9'; Apatič (yellow card) 45'; Knezović 51'	Stadium: Ljudski vrt Attendance: 2,500; Referee: Matej Jug

Colour key: Green = Maribor win; Yellow = draw; Red = opponents win.

== Slovenian League ==
=== July–September ===
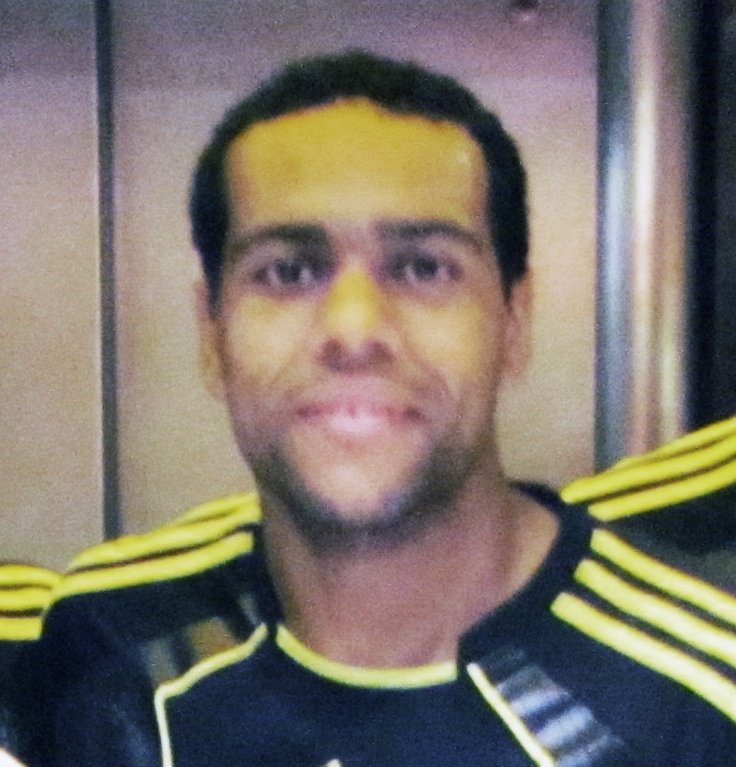
Marcos Tavares, team captain during the 2011–12 season

Maribor began their campaign at Ljudski vrt stadium on 16 July against Gorica, with Aleš Mertelj captaining his side after the absence of Marcos Tavares. A header from Aris Zarifović in the 67th minute put Gorica ahead but the home side responded late in the second half with the goals from Nebojša Kovačević (own goal) and Dejan Mezga, which were enough for the first win of the season. The team faced Nafta Lendava in their first away match of the season with Slovenia international goalkeeper, Jasmin Handanović, between the posts for the first time after his signing with the club. A late goal in the 88th minute from Nafta was merely a consolation, as Maribor was at the time already leading with two goals difference and the match eventually finished with the score 2–1. The result was identical in the next round when Maribor defeated Rudar Velenje at home, with all three goals being scored in the final twenty minutes of the game.

The club's good form continued in their next away match against Triglav as they achieved their fourth straight 2011–12 victory (2–0) and topped the league table for the first time of the season. During the next round their run was stopped with a goalless home draw against the two times champions, Domžale. In the week that followed Maribor played another home match, this time against their rivals Mura 05. The team proved to be too strong against the visiting side, a team that played in the second division during the previous season, and comfortably won the match with the score 6–0. Dalibor Volaš, Etien Velikonja and Agim Ibraimi each scored two goals. Days later club legend Ante Šimundža left the club and became the head coach of Mura 05. Saša Gajser replaced Šimundža as an assistant coach at Maribor. Immediately after their victory over Mura 05 the team traveled to Edinburgh where they faced Scottish champions Rangers in the second leg of the UEFA Europa League play-offs. The match in Scotland ended with a score 1–1 and Maribor proceeded to the next round with the score 3–2 on aggregate, thus becoming the first Slovenian club that qualified to the group stages of the Europa League. They were on the road again less than 72 hours after the historic night when they faced their "eternal" rivals Olimpija, the team considered as Maribor's main contender for the 2011–12 title, at the Stožice Stadium in Ljubljana. Unrecognizable during the first half Maribor went down by three goals at halftime and was unable to turn the result back in their favour. Eventually they lost the game 4–1 and sustained their first league defeat of the season. In addition, this was the first loss for Maribor after 17 consecutive league rounds without defeat (2 April 2011 vs Koper).

Due to the international break at the start of September it was almost two weeks before the next round was played. A timeout well needed by the club that played two matches per week for the better part of the season. After the break Maribor bounced back with another home victory, 5–2 against Celje. In the ninth round they salvaged a point against Koper who took the lead twice during the match. The final score at Bonifika stadium was 2–2. After the first quarter of the season Maribor was on first place, with three-point lead over Olimpija. Poor form continued when the club won only one point in matches against Gorica (1–1) and Nafta (2–0). The loss against the side from Lendava was the first home league defeat since 16 March 2011 when Maribor was defeated 1–0, also by Nafta. The final league match in September, against Rudar Velenje, was postponed as Maribor had obligations in the UEFA Europa League where they faced Birmingham City.

=== October–December ===
The club began October with a 2–0 home win against Triglav and continued their good form with two away wins, 4–1 over Domžale and 3–1 over Mura 05. With three consecutive victories the team was in high spirits as they faced their rivals Olimpija in the final match of the month. Before the 16th round the visiting team from Ljubljana was tied second on the league table and was four points behind the league leaders from Maribor, who still had a deficit of one game due to their postponed match with Rudar Velenje. The match against Olimpija was played in front of 12,500 spectators, the highest of the season, and after dominating the first phase of the game, Maribor found themselves a man down when in the 22nd minute Dejan Mezga received a straight red card for intentionally hitting an opponent. Soon afterwards Olimpija took the first lead in the match when Davor Škerjanc placed a superb volley shot past the home goalkeeper and into the netting. Although they were with only ten players, Maribor regained their composore and had a couple of great chances until the 45th minute when Olimpija's former member, Agim Ibraimi, scored an equaliser from a shot with his weaker right foot. However, one minute later in the injury time of the first half Olimpija took another lead when Dare Vršič's long effort was saved by Jasmin Handanović, and picked up by Filip Valenčič who easily put the ball into the empty net. During most of the second half Maribor had the upper hand and couple of chances when in the 69th minute Goran Cvijanović scored with an excellent shot from the distance. The home side tried to score the winning goal by the end of the 90th minute, however, the match eventually finished 2–2 with both teams earning a point, maintaining the four-point difference between them on the league table.

In the next round Maribor played against Celje on their Arena Petrol stadium and were losing 2–1 until the late equaliser from Cvijanović in the 88th minute. One minute later Dalibor Volaš scored another goal and Maribor won 3–2, taking important three points with them. On 12 November the team played their postponed match of the 12th round against Rudar Velenje and won in Velenje with the score 3–0, bringing their league advantage to seven points. During the next two rounds the club played two consecutive matches at their Ljudski vrt stadium, both times against teams from the Primorska region, Koper and Gorica. The matches were won by Maribor with the identical score, 2–1. The club's good form continued when they won against Nafta Lendava 3–0 away and against Rudar Velenje 1–0 at home thus finishing the first part of the season strong, with six straight victories. The victory goal against Rudar Velenje was scored by Mezga in the injury time of the second half from a penalty shot. Other clubs did not follow Maribor with their good run and fell behind on the league table. Eventually Maribor went into the winter break with 15 points ahead of Gorica and Olimpija who were tied second on the league table. With 15-point clearance and 15 rounds to be played in the second part of the season, the fans and the media already saw Maribor as the 2011–12 PrvaLiga champions.

=== March–May ===
The second part of the season started in early March, after nearly three months pause due to the winter break. Maribor played their first spring match in Kranj where they were surprisingly defeated by Triglav, a team from the bottom of the table. The club then faced Domžale and Mura 05 in two consecutive home matches. Maribor defeated both of them and won all six points available. They then faced their rivals Olimpija at the Stožice Stadium, where the club suffered their highest defeat of the season when they were defeated 4–1 in the seventh round. In front of 8,000 spectators Maribor pressed from the start and Velikonja scored in the sixth minute. The score did not change until early in the second half when Cvijanović increased Maribor's lead, with a superb long distance effort. During the rest of the match, which was at one point suspended for about ten minutes due to crowd trouble, Olimpija tried to make a comeback and in the 88th minute they lowered the score with a penalty shot by Dare Vršič. However, this was not enough as the time eventually ran out and Maribor won with the score 2–1. The club increased their league on the table to over 20 points and it was clear that they were very close in securing their 10th title. Maribor then won their fourth consecutive match when they defeated Celje 3–1, at home. History repeated itself in early April when Maribor traveled to the Primorska region to face Koper and Gorica in two consecutive away games for the second time in the season. Similarly to the two matches in September, Maribor again only managed to win two points in Koper and Nova Gorica. The team bounced back, however, and managed to win the next seven consecutive matches, making the longest winning run of any club during the 2011–12 Slovenian PrvaLiga season. During this period Maribor scored 26 goals and conceded only four. In addition, the run included two dominant home victories over Nafta 6–0 and Triglav 8–0, and also a 3–2 victory over Olimpija. The win over Triglav in the 31st round also secured the title and Maribor became the first club in history of the PrvaLiga, who won the title with five rounds remaining.

During the final round of the season, Maribor played at home against Koper, who needed a win to secure their third-place finish and thus qualify to the UEFA Europa League in the next season. The team from Koper had the desired score when they took the lead in the 25th minute, however, their European dreams was shattered in the last minute of the match when Robert Berić's strike from 20 meters caught their goalkeeper by surprise, for the final score 1–1. This was Darko Milanič's fourth season as the head coach of Maribor and he has led the club to their third league title during this period. After the match, the club officials and players took the trophy and carried it on to the southern platform of the stadium, below which thousand of supporters gathered to celebrate the club's record 10th league title. In honor of this achievement, the club added a permanent golden star on top of their crest.

=== Standings ===
Pos	Team	Pld	W	D	L	GF	GA	GD	Pts	Qualification or relegation
1	Maribor (C)	36	26	7	3	88	35	+53	85	Qualification to Champions League second qualifying round
2	Olimpija	36	19	8	9	60	38	+22	65	Qualification to Europa League first qualifying round
3	Mura 05	36	18	5	13	52	46	+6	59	Qualification to Europa League first qualifying round
4	Koper	36	16	10	10	48	35	+13	58	
5	Gorica	36	14	11	11	49	37	+12	53	

Source: PrvaLiga (in Slovene)
Rules for classification: 1) points; 2) goal difference; 3) number of goals scored.
(C) Champions

==== Results summary ====
Overall								Home						Away					
Pld	W	D	L	GF	GA	GD	Pts	W	D	L	GF	GA	GD	W	D	L	GF	GA	GD
36	26	7	3	88	35	+53	85	14	3	1	50	16	+34	12	4	2	38	19	+19

Last updated: 20 May 2012.

==== Results by round ====
Round	1	2	3	4	5	6	7	8	9	10	11	12	13	14	15	16	17	18	19	20	21	22	23	24	25	26	27	28	29	30	31	32	33	34	35	36
Ground	H	A	H	A	H	H	A	H	A	A	H	A	H	A	A	H	A	H	H	A	H	A	H	H	A	H	A	A	H	A	H	A	A	H	A	H
Result	W	W	W	W	D	W	L	W	D	D	L	W	W	W	W	D	W	W	W	W	W	L	W	W	W	W	D	D	W	W	W	W	W	W	W	D
Position	3	2	2	1	1	1	1	1	1	1	1	1	1	1	1	1	1	1	1	1	1	1	1	1	1	1	1	1	1	1	1	1	1	1	1	1

Updated to match(es) played on 20 May 2012. Source: PrvaLiga official website
A = Away; H = Home; W = Win; D = Draw; L = Loss

=== Matches ===
16 July 2011 1	Maribor	2–1	Gorica	Maribor
20:00 CET	Mertelj (yellow card) 43'; Arghus (yellow card) 53'; Jelić (yellow card) 73'; Kovačević 79' (o.g.); Mezga 82' (pen.)	Report	N. Mevlja (yellow card) 42' (yellow card) 63' (red card); M. Mevlja (yellow card) 51'; Plut (yellow card) 51'; Zarifović 67' (yellow card) 81'; A. Jogan (yellow card) 82'; Galešić (yellow card) 89'	Stadium: Ljudski vrt Attendance: 2,000; Referee: Vojko Goričan

23 July 2011 2	Nafta Lendava	1–2	Maribor	Lendava
20:00 CET	Korošec (yellow card) 5'; Matjašec (yellow card) 45'; Polareczki (yellow card) 83' (goal) 88'; Levačič (yellow card) 90'	Report	Volaš 37'; Berić 84'	Stadium: Športni park Lendava; Attendance: 1,500; Referee: Stanko Preradovič

30 July 2011 3	Maribor	2–1	Rudar Velenje	Maribor
20:00 CET	Trajkovski (yellow card) 47'; Velikonja 69'; Črnic 80'	Report	Mujaković (yellow card) 36'; Rotman (yellow card) 74'; Djokić 88'	Stadium: Ljudski vrt Attendance: 1,200; Referee: Dragoslav Perić

6 August 2011 4	Triglav Kranj	0–2	Maribor	Kranj
18:00 CET	Stjepanović (yellow card) 59'; Najdenov (yellow card) 66'; Đurković (yellow card) 74'	Report	Vidović (yellow card) 11'; Trajkovski (yellow card) 22'; Berić (yellow card) 36' (goal) 44'; Mezga 69' (pen.)	Stadium: Stanko Mlakar Stadium; Attendance: 700; Referee: Roberto Ponis

13 August 2011 5	Maribor	0–0	Domžale	Maribor
20:00 CET	Mejač (yellow card) 68'; Črnic (yellow card) 73'; Ibraimi (yellow card) 88'	Report	Drevenšek (yellow card) 37'; Vidmar (yellow card) 88'; Zec (yellow card) 90+2'	Stadium: Ljudski vrt Attendance: 2,500; Referee: Darko Čeferin (1HT); Sašo Habjanič (2HT)

21 August 2011 6	Maribor	6–0	Mura 05	Maribor
19:00 CET	Volaš 29', 69'; Velikonja 35', 53'; Ibraimi 37', 60'	Report	Janža (yellow card) 62'; Kouter (yellow card) 85'	Stadium: Ljudski vrt Attendance: 3,500; Referee: Dejan Balažič

28 August 2011 7	Olimpija	4–1	Maribor	Ljubljana
19:00 CET	Lovrečič 19'; Čadikovski 34'; Radujko 39'; Sretenović (yellow card) 65'; Vršič 85'	Report	Milec (yellow card) 28'; Ibraimi (yellow card) 62'; Volaš (yellow card) 73'; Tavares 76'	Stadium: Stožice; Attendance: 8,000; Referee: Damir Skomina

10 September 2011 8	Maribor	5–2	Celje	Maribor
20:00 CET	Mezga 22', 82'; Arghus 25' (yellow card) 54'; Tavares (yellow card) 32'; Volaš 67'; Mertelj 90+2'	Report	Močivnik 6'; Bezjak 30'; Gobec (yellow card) 33'; Akakpo (yellow card) 75'	Stadium: Ljudski vrt Attendance: 1,500; Referee: Bojan Mertik

18 September 2011 9	Koper	2–2	Maribor	Koper
20:00 CET	Bubanja 18'; Gavrič (yellow card) 29'; Djukić 51' (yellow card) 58'; Aganović (yellow card) 78'; Bagarić (yellow card) 88'; Handanagić (yellow card) 90+1'	Report	Lesjak 26' (yellow card) 38'; Mejač (yellow card) 32'; Viler (yellow card) 37'; Tavares 64'	Stadium: Bonifika; Attendance: 1,300; Referee: Davor Drečnik

21 September 2011 10	Gorica	1–1	Maribor	Nova Gorica
20:00 CET	Širok (yellow card) 34'; Vicente (yellow card) 69'; M. Mevlja (yellow card) 71'; Plut 65'	Report	Trajkovski (yellow card) 17'; Filipović (yellow card) 50'; Mertelj (red card) 61'; Tavares 90'	Stadium: Sports Park; Attendance: 800; Referee: Roberto Ponis

25 September 2011 11	Maribor	0–2	Nafta Lendava	Maribor
18:00 CET		Report	Gabriel 11'; Caban (yellow card) 48' (goal) 87'; Raduha (yellow card) 68'; Jovanović (yellow card) 76'	Stadium: Ljudski vrt Attendance: 4,500; Referee: Darko Čeferin

12 November 2011 12	Rudar Velenje	0–3	Maribor	Velenje
16:00 CET	Jeseničnik (yellow card) 23'; Črnčič (yellow card) 58' (yellow card) 69' (red card)	Report	Volaaš 35', 74'; Arghus (yellow card) 65'; Velikonja 90+3'	Stadium: Ob Jezeru; Attendance: 1,800; Referee: Jože Vehar

2 October 2011 13	Maribor	2–0	Triglav Kranj	Maribor
18:00 CET	Rajčević (yellow card) 9'; Arghus (yellow card) 10'; Mezga (yellow card) 40'; Velikonja 53'; Filipović (yellow card) 63'; Berić (yellow card) 75'; Tavares 87'	Report	Smolej (yellow card) 64'; Dolžan (yellow card) 69'; Burgar (yellow card) 74'	Stadium: Ljudski vrt Attendance: 1,000; Referee: Damir Skomina

15 October 2011 14	Domžale	1–4	Maribor	Domžale
20:00 CET	Balkovec (yellow card) 15'; Rems (yellow card) 21'; Horvat 55'	Report	Tavares 22'; Filipović (yellow card) 45'; Volaš 62'; Mezga 63'; Milec 90+5'	Stadium: Sports Park; Attendance: 2,100; Referee: Miran Bukovec

23 October 2011 15	Mura 05	1–3	Maribor	Murska Sobota
15:00 CET	Fajić 14' (yellow card) 15'; Janža (yellow card) 26'	Report	Berić 44'; Mezga 76'; Cvijanović 90+2'	Stadium: Fazanerija; Attendance: 5,000; Referee: Matej Jug

30 October 2011 16	Maribor	2–2	Olimpija	Maribor
18:00 CET	Mezga (red card) 22'; Mertelj (yellow card) 35'; Volaš (yellow card) 41'; Ibraimi 45' (yellow card) 45'; Rajčević (yellow card) 58'; Cvijanović 68'	Report	Fink (yellow card) 22'; Škerjanc 28'; Ranić (yellow card) 43'; Valenčič 45+4'; Džafić (yellow card) 68'; Jović (yellow card) 80'	Stadium: Ljudski vrt Attendance: 12,500; Referee: Darko Čeferin

6 November 2011 17	Celje	2–3	Maribor	Celje
15:00 CET	Đaković 20'; Krljanović (yellow card) 72' (yellow card) 83' (red card); Pavlovič 74'; Radulović (yellow card) 86'; Romih (yellow card) 88'	Report	Cvijanović 7', 88'; Filipović (yellow card) 22'; Majer (yellow card) 47'; Mertelj (yellow card) 53'; Milec (yellow card) 73'; Volaš 89'	Stadium: Arena Petrol; Attendance: 2,500; Referee: Dragoslav Perić

19 November 2011 18	Maribor	2–1	Koper	Maribor
17:00 CET	Volaš 33'; Mezga 45' (yellow card) 88'; Trajkovski (yellow card) 51'	Report	Linić (yellow card) 24'; Guberac (yellow card) 32' (goal) 36'; Palčič (yellow card) 53'	Stadium: Ljudski vrt Attendance: 1,200; Referee: Miran Bukovec

23 November 2011 19	Maribor	2–1	Gorica	Maribor
17:30 CET	Majer (yellow card) 38'; Volaš 73'; Cvijanović 78'; Mezga (yellow card) 90+1'	Report	Gregorič (yellow card) 34'; Plut 39'; Kovacevic (yellow card) 73'; Galešić (yellow card) 83'; Jogan (yellow card) 90+3'	Stadium: Ljudski vrt Attendance: 1,000; Referee: Dejan Balažič

27 November 2011 20	Nafta Lendava	0–3	Maribor	Lendava
15:00 CET	Matjašec (yellow card) 84'	Report	Volaš 34'; Rajčević (yellow card) 36'; Potokar (yellow card) 39'; Majer (yellow card) 42'; Tavares 54'; Arghus 62'; Filipović (yellow card) 72'	Stadium: Športni park Lendava; Attendance: 1,000; Referee: Matej Jug

4 December 2011 21	Maribor	1–0	Rudar Velenje	Maribor
16:00 CET	Milec (yellow card) 89'; Mezga 90+3' (pen.)	Report	Majcen (yellow card) 84'; Mujakovič (yellow card) 89'; Dedič (yellow card) 89'	Stadium: Ljudski vrt Attendance: 1,500; Referee: Mitja Žganec

4 March 2012 22	Triglav Kranj	2–1	Maribor	Kranj
13:00 CET	Pokorn (yellow card) 3'; Jelar 29'; Đurić (yellow card) 56'; Đurković 60' (yellow card) 60'; Burgar (yellow card) 90'	Report	Volaš 90+4'	Stadium: Stanko Mlakar Stadium; Attendance: 1,600; Referee: Dejan Balažič

10 March 2012 23	Maribor	2–1	Domžale	Maribor
16:00 CET	Velikonja 37'; Volaš 61'; Milec (yellow card) 76'	Report	Zec (yellow card) 14'; Živec 45'; Knezović (yellow card) 62'; Skubic (yellow card) 81'	Stadium: Ljudski vrt Attendance: 3,000; Referee: Miran Bukovec

17 March 2012 24	Maribor	3–1	Mura 05	Maribor
17:30 CET	Cvijanović 23'; Mejač (yellow card) 36'; Ibraimi 44', 46'	Report	Horvat (yellow card) 34'; Fajić 76'; Sreš (yellow card) 80'	Stadium: Ljudski vrt Attendance: 4,000; Referee: Mitja Žganec

21 March 2012 25	Olimpija	1–2	Maribor	Ljubljana
18:00 CET	Ivelja (yellow card) 23'; Nikezić (yellow card) 26'; Jović (yellow card) 57'; Vršič 88' (pen.)	Report	Velikonja 6'; Filipović (yellow card) 30'; Milec (yellow card) 40'; Cvijanović 53'; Handanović (yellow card) 63'; Ibraimi (yellow card) 90+2'	Stadium: Stožice; Attendance: 8,000; Referee: Damir Skomina

25 March 2012 26	Maribor	3–1	Celje	Maribor
17:00 CET	Velikonja 17'; Filipović (yellow card) 26'; Cvijanović 47'; Tavares 65' (pen.)	Report	Romih (yellow card) 13'; Centrih (yellow card) 65'; Kapič (yellow card) 79'; Krajcer 89'	Stadium: Ljudski vrt Attendance: 3,500; Referee: Darko Čeferin

1 April 2012 27	Koper	2–2	Maribor	Koper
17:00 CET	Brečević 14', 65'; Struna (yellow card) 33'; Palčič (yellow card) 55'; Aganović (yellow card) 63'; Blažič (yellow card) 87'	Report	Velikonja 5'; Tavares 80'; Volaš (yellow card) 87'	Stadium: Bonifika; Attendance: 2,300; Referee: Bojan Mertik

4 April 2012 28	Gorica	0–0	Maribor	Nova Gorica
18:00 CET	Kovačevič (yellow card) 53'; Zarifovič (yellow card) 74'	Report	Berić (yellow card) 41'; Viler (yellow card) 51'	Stadium: Sports Park; Attendance: 500; Referee: Dragoslav Perić

7 April 2012 29	Maribor	6–0	Nafta Lendava	Maribor
18:00 CET	Volaš 2' (pen.); Ibraimi (yellow card) 27' (goal) 28'; Viler 39'; Tavares 61', 73'; Berić 88'	Report	Osaj (yellow card) 1'; Dolinar (yellow card) 18'; S. Vinko (yellow card) 76'	Stadium: Ljudski vrt Attendance: 2,000; Referee: Mitja Žganec

14 April 2012 30	Rudar Velenje	0–2	Maribor	Velenje
18:00 CET	Krefl (yellow card) 1'; Novaković (yellow card) 11'	Report	Lesjak (yellow card) 13' (goal) 65'; Mezga (yellow card) 64'; Berić 79'	Stadium: Ob Jezeru; Attendance: 1,400; Referee: Damir Skomina

23 April 2012 31	Maribor	8–0	Triglav Kranj	Maribor
17:30 CET	Velikonja 15', 17', 69'; Ibraimi 36', 81'; Šušteršič 42' (o.g.); Rajčević 56'; Volaš 89'	Report	Stjepanović (yellow card) 9'; Krcić (yellow card) 65'	Stadium: Ljudski vrt Attendance: 4,500; Referee: Roman Glažar

27 April 2012 32	Domžale	0–2	Maribor	Domžale
19:00 CET	Balkovec (yellow card) 42'	Report	D. Topič 50' (o.g.); Ibraimi 57'; Cvijanović (yellow card) 60'	Stadium: Sports Park; Attendance: 1,000; Referee: Miran Bukovec

6 May 2012 33	Mura 05	1–3	Maribor	Murska Sobota
16:00 CET	Bohar 24' (pen.); Kous (yellow card) 34'; Travner (yellow card) 79'	Report	Mertelj 18' (yellow card) 23'; Vidović (yellow card) 23' (yellow card) 47' (red card); Arghus 56'; Volaš 71'	Stadium: Fazanerija; Attendance: 3,700; Referee: Emir Huselja

12 May 2012 34	Maribor	3–2	Olimpija	Maribor
20:00 CET	Filipović (yellow card) 14'; Volaš 32'; Mejač (yellow card) 41'; Velikonja 42', 57'	Report	Vršič (yellow card) 27'; Jović (yellow card) 40'; Lovrečič 63'; Ivelja (yellow card) 71'; Bešić 90'	Stadium: Ljudski vrt Attendance: 10,000; Referee: Dragoslav Perić

17 May 2012 35	Celje	1–2	Maribor	Celje
18:00 CET	Bezjak 10' (pen.); Krajcer (yellow card) 16'; Kovjenić (yellow card) 32'	Report	Vidović (yellow card) 5'; Arghus (yellow card) 10'; Mezga 16' (pen.), 68'; Lesjak (yellow card) 59'	Stadium: Arena Petrol; Attendance: 400; Referee: Sašo Habjanič

20 May 2012 36	Maribor	1–1	Koper	Maribor
17:00 CET	Ibraimi (yellow card) 42'; Velikonja (yellow card) 57'; Berić 89'	Report	Pučko 25' (yellow card) 85'; Đukić (yellow card) 43'; Handanagić (yellow card) 48'; Palčič (yellow card) 67'; Žibret (yellow card) 82'	Stadium: Ljudski vrt Attendance: 9,000; Referee: Darko Čeferin

Colour key: Green = Maribor win; Yellow = draw; Red = opponents win.

== Slovenian Cup ==
Maribor entered the 2011–12 Slovenian Football Cup in the second round (round of 16), in which they were drawn to face Adria Miren of the Slovenian third division. The two teams met in Miren, a small town in the Primorska region near the Italian border, and Maribor won 2–0 with plenty of missed opportunities. They then faced another third division side, Zavrč, in the quarter-final. The match was played over two legs, the first leg being played in Zavrč. Maribor quickly found themselves in trouble when they faced a surprising two-goal deficit within 28 minutes of play. They then fought back and with the goal from Željko Filipović they finished the first half, losing 2–1. Zavrč scored their third goal at the start of the second half to take a 3–1 lead before Maribor staged a comeback with goals from Etien Velikonja and Dragan Jelić, for the final score 3–3. In the second leg, in front of 4,500 spectators, Maribor dominated throughout the match, but only managed to score once for the final score 1–0, thus qualifying in the semi-final with the score 4–3 aggregate.

The club then faced Rudar Velenje in the semi-final. The first leg was played in Velenje on 11 April 2011 and Maribor quickly showed why they were considered favourites, when Etien Velikonja scored early in the match. However, the home side equalised with a goal from Leon Črnčič in the 22nd minute and 1–1 was the final score of the first half. During the second Maribor went forward and started creating chances. This tactic capitalized during a span of eight minutes, from 57th to 65th, when Maribor scored three goals (Mejač, Velikonja, Ibraimi) for a comfortable three-goal lead. Eventually, the home side managed to score again in the 81st minute for the final score 4–2 in favour of the guests. The second leg was played one week later at Ljudski vrt stadium, and, after a 2–2 score after first half, Maribor again prevailed in the second, scoring twice for another 4–2 victory and an aggregate score 8–4. Velikonja again showed his good form with another two goals in the competition.

8 October 2011 Round of 16	Adria	0–2	Maribor	Miren
15:30 CET		Report	Lesjak 25'; Volaš 53'	Stadium: Pri Štantu Stadium; Attendance: 700; Referee: Andrej Žnidaršič

26 October 2011 Quarter-finals 1st leg	Zavrč	3–3	Maribor	Zavrč
15:00 CET	Lenart 15'; Murat 28'; Murko (yellow card) 31'; Darmopil (yellow card) 37'; Šnajder 50' (yellow card) 87'; Kuserbanj (yellow card) 89'	Report	Filipović 33' (yellow card) 35'; Velikonja 56' (pen.); Jelić 73'; Trajkovski (yellow card) 79'	Stadium: Zavrč Sports Park; Attendance: 1,500; Referee: Mitja Žganec

16 November 2011 Quarter-finals 2nd leg	Maribor	1–0 (4–3 agg.)	Zavrč	Maribor
18:00 CET	Velikonja 76'	Report	Filipovič (yellow card) 19'; Gabrovec (yellow card) 27, 60' (yellow-red card); Letonja (yellow card) 59'	Stadium: Ljudski vrt Attendance: 4,500; Referee: Nejc Kajtazović

11 April 2012 Semi-finals 1st leg	Rudar Velenje	2–4	Maribor	Velenje
18:00 CET	Črnčič (yellow card) 15' (goal) 22'; Rotman (yellow card) 80'; Majcen 81'	Report	Velikonja 7', 61'; Mejač 57'; Ibraimi 65'	Stadium: Ob Jezeru; Attendance: 1,400; Referee: Matej Jug

18 April 2012 Semi-finals 2nd leg	Maribor	4–2 (8–4 agg.)	Rudar Velenje	Maribor
17:30 CET	Berić 10'; Ibraimi (yellow card) 15'; Milec (yellow card) 48'; Velikonja 18', 81'; Tavares 90'	Report	Rotman 9'; Klinar 37'; Novaković (yellow card) 65'	Stadium: Ljudski vrt Attendance: 2,000; Referee: Dragoslav Perić

23 May 2012 Final	Celje	2–2 (a.e.t.) (2–3 p)	Maribor	Ljubljana
20:45 CSET	Ristovski (yellow card) 15'; Medved (yellow card) 22'; Romih 36' (yellow card) 36'; Kapić (yellow card) 59'; Gobec (yellow card) 86'; Verbić 92' (yellow card) 92'; Kotnik T. (yellow card) 110'; Moćić (red card) 119'	Report	Mejač (yellow card) 36'; Volaš 46'; Viler (yellow card) 88'; Cvijanović (yellow card) 94'; Črnic 99'; Volaš (yellow card) 110'; Ibraimi (yellow card) 113' (yellow card) 117' (red card)	Stadium: Stožice; Attendance: 4,132; Referee: Matej Jug
	Penalties
	Verbič (penalty missed); Gobec (penalty scored); Bezjak (penalty missed); Romih (penalty scored); Centrih (penalty missed)		Cvijanović (penalty missed); Rajčević (penalty scored); Volaš (penalty scored); Mejač (penalty missed); Tavares (penalty scored)

Colour key: Green = Maribor win; Yellow = draw; Red = opponents win.

== UEFA Champions League ==
Qualified as the 2010–11 Slovenian PrvaLiga champions, Maribor started their European campaign in the second qualifying round of the 2011–12 UEFA Champions League against Dudelange from Luxembourg, a team that advanced through the first qualifying round with a 4–0 aggregate victory over Santa Coloma. The first match between Maribor and Dudelange was played in Ljudski vrt stadium and won by Maribor with the score 2–0; Arghus and Ibraimi were the goalscorers. Seven days later the team played a rematch with the Luxembourg side and comfortably achieved another victory (3–1), thus qualifying to the next round. They then faced Israeli Premier League champions Maccabi Haifa, in the first meeting in European competitions between Maribor and a team from Israel. The match was lost 3–2 on aggregate, relegating Maribor to the play-off round of the UEFA Europa League, where they faced a home draw against the Scottish Premier League champions Rangers.

=== Second qualifying round ===
13 July 2011 First leg	Maribor (Slovenia)	2–0	(Luxembourg) Dudelange	Maribor, Slovenia
20:00 CET	Berić (yellow card) 18'; Arghus 36'; Ibraimi 45'; Mertelj (yellow card) 90+4'	Report; Report	Melisse (yellow card) 56'; Caillet (yellow card) 58'; Legros (yellow card) 77'; Abdullei (yellow card) 85'; Joubert (yellow card) 90+4'	Stadium: Ljudski vrt Attendance: 5,500; Referee: Veaceslav Banari (Moldavia)

19 July 2011 Second leg	Dudelange (Luxembourg)	1–3 (1–5 agg.)	(Slovenia) Maribor	Dudelange, Luxembourg
18:00 CET	Caillet (yellow card) 7' (yellow card) 75' (red card); Da Mota 54' (yellow card) 70' (yellow card) 76' (red card); Wiggers (yellow card) 89'	Report; Report	Mezga 27', 76' (pen.); Arghus (yellow card) 50'; Berić 72'	Stadium: Stade Jos Nosbaum; Attendance: 1,152; Referee: Adrian Azzopardi (Malta)

Colour key: Green = Maribor win; Yellow = draw; Red = opponents win.

=== Third qualifying round ===
27 July 2011 First leg	Maccabi Haifa (Israel)	2–1	(Slovenia) Maribor	Haifa, Israel
20:05 CET	Dvalishvili 8' (pen.); Golasa (yellow card) 50'; Yampolsky 70'; Vered (yellow card) 81'; Davidovich (yellow card) 84'	Report; Report	Arghus (yellow card) 7'; Tavares 27'; Cvijanović (yellow card) 87'	Stadium: Kiryat Eliezer; Attendance: 10,000; Referee: Artur Manuel Ribeiro Soares Dias (Portugal)

3 August 2011 Second leg	Maribor (Slovenia)	1–1 (2–3 agg.)	(Israel) Maccabi Haifa	Maribor, Slovenia
20:45 CET	Mezga (yellow card) 29'; Tavares 32'; Mejač (yellow card) 53'	Report; Report	Vered 10'; Buljat (yellow card) 16'; Twatiha (yellow card) 19'; Meshumar (yellow card) 75'; Dvalishvili (yellow card) 78'	Stadium: Ljudski vrt Attendance: 12,000; Referee: Said Ennjimi (France)

Colour key: Green = Maribor win; Yellow = draw; Red = opponents win.

== UEFA Europa League ==

The 2011–12 UEFA Europa League starting lineup that beat Rangers 2–1 in Maribor.

It was the second time in European competitions that Maribor played against Rangers as the two clubs have faced each other during the 2001–02 UEFA Champions League second qualifying round, when the side from Glasgow easily prevailed with the score 6–1 aggregate. One decade later the two teams met in a crucial two-legged qualifiers that would determine which club would advance into group stage of the UEFA Europa League. First leg was played at the Ljudski vrt stadium in Maribor and after suffering by a goal deficit at halftime, the home side turned the score around with two goals in the second to win the match 2–1. Maribor's second goal of the night came from a back-heel kick by Etien Velikonja during the final seconds of injury time. It later turned out that the goal from Velikonja was decisive as the second leg at Ibrox Stadium finished with the score 1–1. Maribor thus qualified to the group stages of the UEFA Europa League for the first time in their history. The match in Scotland was played on 25 August, the same date as the twelve years earlier when Maribor defeated Lyon and qualified to the elite UEFA Champions League.

For their first appearance in the Europa League, Maribor was drawn into Group H together with 2010–11 runners up Braga, 1975–76 runners up Club Brugge and English Championship side Birmingham City, which qualified to the competition as the winners of the 2011 Football League Cup. The club won one point in six matches, eventually finishing at the bottom of the table. Their campaign started in Bruges against Club Brugge. The home side showed their quality in the opening minutes and quickly took a two-goal lead, which was enough for their 2–0 victory. Maribor then played their first home match against Birmingham City and fared well during the first hour when they were leading 1–0 from a first half goal by Dalibor Volaš. The English side, however, bounced back with two goals in the final 30 minutes and won the match 2–1. Almost a month later Maribor played their second consecutive home match, this time against Braga. Agim Ibraimi's strike in the 14th minute gave the home side a lead until Elderson equalised in the final seconds of the first half. The goal was controversial as it was scored from an offside position. Both teams failed to score a decisive goal in the second half and the match finished as a draw, giving Maribor their first point.

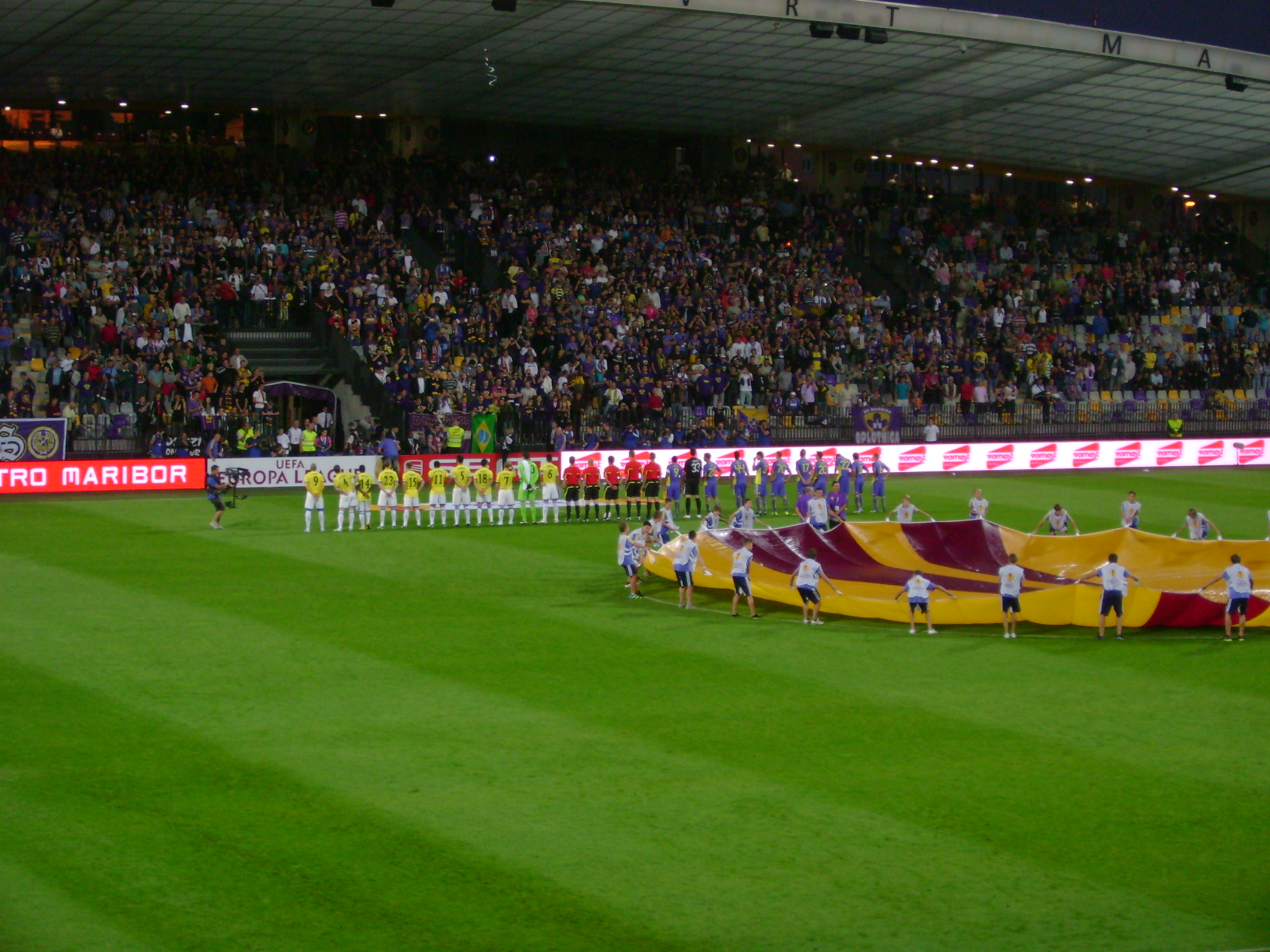
Moments before the opening kickoff between Maribor and Birmingham City

Early in November the team traveled to Portugal to face Braga for the second time. There they were outplayed from the start as the Portuguese team took a two-goal lead within the ten-minute mark, with another first-half goal coming from Elderson in the 38th minute. During the second half, Maribor showed a better performance, with Volaš reducing the home lead in the 62nd minute. Minutes later Ibraimi had a chance to bring his side to a one-goal deficit; however, his free kick strike hit the crossbar. During the final minutes Braga scored two more goals for a 5–1 victory. The club then made headlines across Europe when they hosted Club Brugge at the Ljudski vrt stadium. During much of the match Maribor showed one of their best performances of the season, taking a 3–0 lead in the 68th minute with two goals coming from Volaš and an own goal by Ryan Donk. The score stayed the same until the goal by Nabil Dirar in the 74th minute, which started a comeback for the Belgians. Soon afterwards Dirar scored his second, followed by a goal from Joseph Akpala and by the 82nd minute the score was 3–3. Club Brugge then pressed forward in hopes of scoring a winning goal, which would bring them a much needed three points in their battle for promotion. The goal came in the final seconds of the match and was scored by Donk who corrected his mistake in the 51st minute when he was responsible for an own goal. Without a chance for promotion, Maribor played their last Europa League match of the season at the St Andrew's stadium in Birmingham. The poor performance on the pitch produced one goal from the home side and Birmingham City won the match 1–0, with both teams concluding their European campaign of the season.

=== Play-off round ===
18 August 2011 First leg	Maribor (Slovenia)	2–1	(Scotland) Rangers	Maribor, Slovenia
20:45 CET	Ibraimi 52'; Mejač (yellow card) 53'; Arghus (yellow card) 80'; Velikonja 90+2'	Report; Report	Juanma 31'; Naismith (yellow card) 37'; Lafferty (yellow card) 81'	Stadium: Ljudski vrt Attendance: 11,000; Referee: Manuel Gräfe (Germany)

25 August 2011 Second leg	Rangers (Scotland)	1–1 (2–3 agg.)	(Slovenia) Maribor	Glasgow, Scotland
20:30 CET	Juanma (yellow card) 45+2'; Bocanegra 76'; Healy (yellow card) 81'; Lafferty (yellow card) 86'; Broadfoot (yellow card) 89'	Report; Report	Arghus (yellow card) 43'; Volaš 55'; Ibraimi (yellow card) 64'; Handanović (yellow card) 86'; Viler (yellow card) 90+1'	Stadium: Ibrox; Attendance: 32,223; Referee: Aleksandar Stavrev (Macedonia)

Colour key: Green = Maribor win; Yellow = draw; Red = opponents win.

=== Group H ===
15 September 2011 Matchday 1	Club Brugge (Belgium)	2–0	(Slovenia) Maribor	Bruges, Belgium
21:05 CET	Odjidja 7'; Dirar 24'; Blondel (yellow card) 76'; Zimling (yellow card) 83'	Report; Report	Filipović (yellow card) 3'; Rajčević (yellow card) 10' (red card) 85'; Ibraimi (yellow card) 64'	Stadium: Jan Breydel Stadion; Attendance: 16,668; Referee: Fırat Aydınus (Turkey)

29 September 2011 Matchday 2	Maribor (Slovenia)	1–2	(England) Birmingham	Maribor, Slovenia
19:00 CET	Volaš 29'; Lesjak (yellow card) 90+2'	Report; Report	Ridgewell (yellow card) 44'; Burke 64'; Elliott 79'; Gomis (yellow card) 80'	Stadium: Ljudski vrt Attendance: 10,000; Referee: Tom Harald Hagen (Norway)

20 October 2011 Matchday 3	Maribor (Slovenia)	1–1	(Portugal) Braga	Maribor, Slovenia
19:00 CET	Ibraimi 14'; Lesjak (yellow card) 64'; Trajkovski (yellow card) 66'; Mezga (yellow card) 77'	Report; Report	Elderson 44'; Alan (yellow card) 57'; Djamal (yellow card) 84'	Stadium: Ljudski vrt Attendance: 8,000; Referee: Stephan Studer (Switzerland)

3 November 2011 Matchday 4	Braga (Portugal)	5–1	(Slovenia) Maribor	Braga, Portugal
21:05 CET	Lima 4' (yellow card) 39'; Alan 8'; Elderson 38'; Barbosa (yellow card) 77'; Vinícius 85'; Mérida 90+1'	Report; Report	Mezga (yellow card) 35'; Milec (yellow card) 61'; Volaš 62'	Stadium: Estádio Municipal de Braga; Attendance: 7,185; Referee: Leontios Trattou (Cyprus)

30 November 2011 Matchday 5	Maribor (Slovenia)	3–4	(Belgium) Club Brugge	Maribor, Slovenia
19:00 CET	Volaš 11', 68'; Tavares (yellow card) 45+2'; Cvijanović (yellow card) 49'; Donk 51' (o.g.); Mertelj (yellow card) 89'	Report; Report	Rafaelov (yellow card) 35'; De Jonghe (yellow card) 42'; Donk (yellow card) 45+2' (goal) 90'; Dirar 74' (yellow card) 90'; Volaš 77' (o.g.); Akpala 82'	Stadium: Ljudski vrt Attendance: 8,000; Referee: Libor Kovařik (Czech Republic)

15 December 2011 Matchday 6	Birmingham City (England)	1–0	(Slovenia) Maribor	Birmingham, England
21:05 CET	Gomis (yellow card) 11'; Rooney 24'; Murphy (yellow card) 70'	Report; Report	Vidović (yellow card) 51'; Arghus (yellow card) 60'	Stadium: St Andrew's; Attendance: 21,436; Referee: Sascha Kever (Switzerland)

Colour key: Green = Maribor win; Yellow = draw; Red = opponents win.

Pos	Team	Pld	W	D	L	GF	GA	GD	Pts	Qualification
1	(Belgium) Club Brugge	6	3	2	1	12	9	+3	11 (Note: Head-to-head points: Club Brugge 4, Braga 1.)	Advance to knockout phase
2	(Portugal) Braga	6	3	2	1	12	6	+6	11	Advance to knockout phase
3	(England) Birmingham City	6	3	1	2	8	8	0	10	
4	(Slovenia) Maribor	6	0	1	5	6	15	−9	1	

Source: Soccerway

== Squad statistics ==
=== Key ===
Players

- No. = Shirt number
- Pos. = Playing position
- GK = Goalkeeper
- DF = Defender
- MF = Midfielder
- FW = Forward

Nationality

- = Brazil
- = Croatia
- (North Macedonia) = Macedonia
- = Slovenia

Competitions

- Apps = Appearances
- = Yellow card
- (red card) = Red card

Key
‡	The player was selected in the official 2011–12 Slovenian PrvaLiga team of the season
♦	The player was the top scorer in the respective competition

=== Appearances and goals ===
Correct as of 23 May 2011, end of the 2011–12 season. Flags indicate national team as has been defined under FIFA eligibility rules. Players may hold more than one non-FIFA nationality. The players squad numbers, playing positions, nationalities and statistics are based solely on match reports in Matches section above and the official website of NK Maribor. Only the players, which made at least one appearance for the first team, are listed.

List of Maribor players, who represented the team during the 2011–12 season, and displaying their statistics during that timeframe
No.	Pos.	Name	Apps	Goals	Apps	Goals	Apps	Goals	Apps	Goals	Apps	Goals	Apps	Goals
No.	Pos.	Name	League		Cup		Supercup		Champions League		Europa League		Total	
2^{[B]}	MF	(Slovenia) Matic Črnic	13	1	4	1	—	—	—	—	1	0	18	2
4	DF	(Slovenia) Jovan Vidović	12	0	3	0	1	0	2	0	1	0	19	0
5	MF	(Slovenia) Željko Filipović	26	0	4	1	1	0	3	0	5	0	39	1
6	DF	(Slovenia) Martin Milec ‡	24	1	3	0	1	0	3	0	6	0	37	1
7	DF	(Slovenia) Aleš Mejač	20	0	5	1	—	—	4	0	2	0	31	1
8	MF	(Croatia) Dejan Mezga	19	10	2	0	1	0	4	2	8	0	34	12
9	FW	(Brazil) Marcos Tavares	31	10	6	1	1	0	4	2	7	0	49	13
10	MF	(North Macedonia) Agim Ibraimi ‡	27	9	4	1	1	1 ♦	3	1	8	2	43	14
11	FW	(Slovenia) Etien Velikonja	30	14	5	6 ♦	1	0	3	0	4	1	43	21
12	GK	(Slovenia) Marko Pridigar	10	0	3	0	1	0	2	0	—	—	16	0
13	GK	(Slovenia) Matej Radan	—	—	1	0	—	—	—	—	—	—	1	0
17	FW	(Slovenia) Dalibor Volaš ‡	34	17	5	2	1	0	3	0	8	5	51	24
20	MF	(Slovenia) Goran Cvijanović ‡	33	8	6	0	1	0	4	0	7	0	51	8
22	DF	(Slovenia) Nejc Potokar	17	0	1	0	—	—	—	—	5	0	23	0
24	DF	(Slovenia) Dejan Trajkovski	15	0	1	0	—	—	1	0	4	0	21	0
26	DF	(Slovenia) Aleksander Rajčević ‡	33	1	4	0	1	0	4	0	6	0	48	1
27	FW	(Slovenia) Alen Ploj	—	—	2	0	—	—	—	—	—	—	2	0
28	DF	(Slovenia) Mitja Viler	16	1	3	0	1	0	1	0	4	0	25	1
29	MF	(Slovenia) Timotej Dodlek	1	0	—	—	—	—	—	—	—	—	1	0
30	MF	(Slovenia) Petar Stojanović	2	0	—	—	—	—	—	—	—	—	2	0
31	MF	(Croatia) Zoran Lesjak	17	2	4	1	—	—	—	—	4	0	25	3
32	FW	(Slovenia) Robert Berić	28	6	4	1	1	0	4	1	7	0	44	8
33	GK	(Slovenia) Jasmin Handanović ‡	26	0	2	0	—	—	2	0	8	0	38	0
36	DF	(Slovenia) Aleš Majer	6	0	1	0	—	—	—	—	—	—	7	0
44	DF	(Brazil) Arghus^{[C]}	15	3	4	0	—	—	3	1	7	0	29	4
55	MF	(Slovenia) Rajko Rep	2	0	—	—	—	—	—	—	—	—	2	0
61	FW	(Slovenia) Dragan Jelić	2	0	2	1	—	—	—	—	—	—	4	1
70	MF	(Slovenia) Aleš Mertelj	31	2	5	0	1	0	4	0	8	0	49	2
90	MF	(Brazil) Gabriel	2	0	—	—	—	—	1	0	—	—	3	0

=== Discipline ===
Correct as of 23 May 2011, end of the 2011–12 season. Flags indicate national team as has been defined under FIFA eligibility rules. Players may hold more than one non-FIFA nationality. The players squad numbers, playing positions, nationalities and statistics are based solely on match reports in Matches section above and the official website of NK Maribor. If a player received two yellow cards in a match and was subsequently sent off the numbers count as two yellow cards, one red card. Only the players, which received at least one yellow or red card, are listed

List of Maribor players, who represented the team during the 2011–12 season, and displaying their statistics during that timeframe
No.	Pos.	Name	Booked	Sent off (straight red)	Booked	Sent off (straight red)	Booked	Sent off (straight red)	Booked	Sent off (straight red)	Booked	Sent off (straight red)	Booked	Sent off (straight red)
No.	Pos.	Name	League		Cup		Supercup		Champions League		Europa League		Total	
2^{[B]}	MF	(Slovenia) Matic Črnic	1	0	0	0	—	—	—	—	0	0	1	0
4	DF	(Slovenia) Jovan Vidović	4	1	0	0	1	0	0	0	1	0	6	1
5	MF	(Slovenia) Željko Filipović	8	0	1	0	0	0	0	0	1	0	10	0
6	DF	(Slovenia) Martin Milec ‡	4	0	1	0	0	0	0	0	1	0	6	0
7	DF	(Slovenia) Aleš Mejač	4	0	1	0	—	—	1	0	1	0	7	0
8	MF	(Croatia) Dejan Mezga	4	1	0	0	0	0	1	0	2	0	7	1
9	FW	(Brazil) Marcos Tavares	1	0	0	0	0	0	0	0	1	0	2	0
10	MF	(North Macedonia) Agim Ibraimi ‡	5	0	3	1	0	0	0	0	2	0	10	1
11	FW	(Slovenia) Etien Velikonja	1	0	0	0	0	0	0	0	0	0	1	0
17	FW	(Slovenia) Dalibor Volaš ‡	3	0	1	0	0	0	0	0	0	0	4	0
20	MF	(Slovenia) Goran Cvijanović ‡	1	0	1	0	0	0	1	0	1	0	4	0
22	DF	(Slovenia) Nejc Potokar	1	0	0	0	—	—	—	—	0	0	1	0
24	DF	(Slovenia) Dejan Trajkovski	4	0	1	0	—	—	0	0	1	0	6	0
26	DF	(Slovenia) Aleksander Rajčević ‡	3	0	0	0	0	0	0	0	1	1	4	1
28	DF	(Slovenia) Mitja Viler	2	0	0	0	0	0	0	0	1	0	3	0
31	MF	(Croatia) Zoran Lesjak	3	0	0	0	—	—	—	—	2	0	5	0
32	FW	(Slovenia) Robert Berić	3	0	0	0	0	0	1	0	0	0	4	0
33	GK	(Slovenia) Jasmin Handanović ‡	1	0	0	0	—	—	0	0	1	0	2	0
36	DF	(Slovenia) Aleš Majer	3	0	0	0	—	—	—	—	—	—	3	0
44	DF	(Brazil) Arghus^{[C]}	5	0	0	0	—	—	2	0	4	0	11	0
61	FW	(Slovenia) Dragan Jelić	1	0	0	0	—	—	—	—	—	—	1	0
70	MF	(Slovenia) Aleš Mertelj	3	1	0	0	0	0	1	0	1	0	5	1

== Transfers and loans ==
=== Summer transfer window ===
Transfer	Position	Name	Nat.	From / last	To	Note
Transfer out	DF	Luka Krajnc	(Slovenia)	Maribor	Genoa	Undisclosed transfer fee; alleged to be around €0,9 million
Transfer out	FW	Armend Sprečo	(Slovenia)	Maribor	Mura 05	Released by the club
Loan in	FW	Dalibor Volaš	(Slovenia)	Sheriff	Maribor	Loan until 1 June 2012
Transfer in	MF	Agim Ibraimi	(North Macedonia)	Nafta Lendava	Maribor	Free agent
Transfer in	DF	Arghus^{[C]}	(Brazil)	SE River Plate	Maribor	Free agent
Transfer out	MF	Tomislav Pavličić	(Croatia)	Maribor	Cibalia	Released by the club
Transfer out	FW	Liridon Osmanaj	(Slovenia)	Maribor	Domžale	Free agent
Loan out	FW	Alen Ploj	(Slovenia)	Maribor	Aluminij	Loan until 1 June 2012 (double registration)
Loan out	DF	Mitja Rešek	(Slovenia)	Maribor	Heerenveen	Loan until 1 June 2012
Transfer in	GK	Jasmin Handanović	(Slovenia)	Empoli	Maribor	Free agent
Loan out	MF	Rajko Rep	(Slovenia)	Maribor	Mura 05	Loan until 1 June 2012
Loan out	MF	Timotej Dodlek	(Slovenia)	Maribor	Mura 05	Loan until 1 June 2012
Transfer in	MF	Zoran Lesjak	(Croatia)	Nafta Lendava	Maribor	Undisclosed transfer fee; alleged to be around €0,15 million
Loan out	MF	João Gabriel da Silva	(Brazil)	Maribor	Nafta Lendava	Loan until 1 June 2012

=== Winter transfer window ===
Transfer	Position	Name	Nat.	From / last	To	Note
Loan out	DF	Matic Črnic	(Slovenia)	Maribor	Dravinja	Loan until 1 June 2012 (double registration)
Loan out	DF	Matjaž Kek	(Slovenia)	Maribor	Dravinja	Loan until 1 June 2012 (double registration)
Transfer out	FW	Dragan Jelić	(Slovenia)	Maribor	Mura 05	Released by the club

== Footnotes ==
- ^{A} Knockout matches which were decided on penalty kicks are listed as a draw.
- ^{B} Matic Črnic started the season with the number 2 on his jersey and changed it to 92 during the winter break.
- ^{C} Arghus holds a dual citizenship of Brazil and Italy.

== See also ==
- List of NK Maribor seasons
