= 2011–12 Slovenian Football Cup =

Pokal Hervis 2011–12
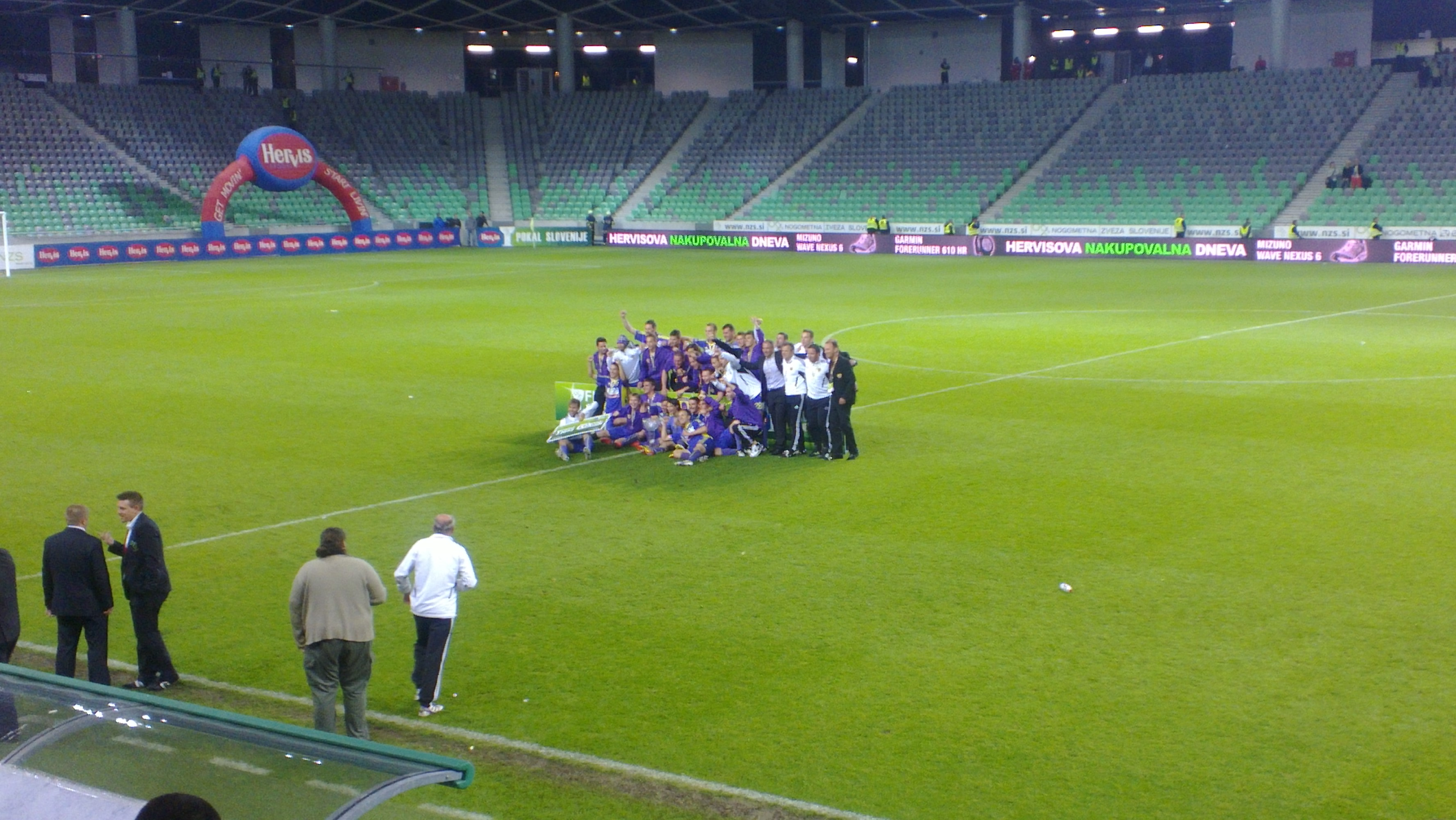

Tournament details
- Country: Slovenia
- Teams: 28

Final positions
- Champions: Maribor (7th title)
- Runners-up: Celje

Tournament statistics
- Matches played: 31
- Goals scored: 120 (3.87 per match)
- Top goal scorer: Etien Velikonja (6 goals)

The 2011–12 Slovenian Football Cup was the 21st season of the Slovenian Football Cup, Slovenia's football knockout competition. Domžale were the defending champions, having won their first Slovenian Cup the previous season.

Maribor won their seventh cup, beating Celje in the final after penalty shoot-out.

As runners-up of the competition, Celje qualified for the first qualifying round of the 2012–13 UEFA Europa League, since Maribor was already qualified for the 2012–13 UEFA Champions League as Slovenian PrvaLiga champions.

== Qualified clubs ==
=== 2010–11 Slovenian PrvaLiga members ===
- Celje
- Domžale
- Gorica
- Koper
- Maribor
- Nafta
- Olimpija
- Rudar
- Triglav Kranj
- Primorje (dissolved following the 2010–11 season)

=== Qualified through MNZ Regional Cups ===
Winners and runners-up of the regional MNZ cups.

- MNZ Ljubljana: Krka, Interblock
- MNZ Maribor: Limbuš-Pekre, Malečnik
- MNZ Celje: Krško, NK Šentjur
- MNZ Koper: Portorož Piran, Ilirska Bistrica
- MNZ Nova Gorica: Adria, Tolmin
- MNZ Murska Sobota: Veržej, Grad
- MNZ Lendava: Hotiza, Odranci
- MNZG-Kranj: Šenčur, Britof
- MNZ Ptuj: Zavrč, Drava (dissolved following the 2010–11 season)

== First round ==
The matches took place on 23 and 24 August 2011. Adria and NK Šentjur were automatically qualified for the round of 16.

23 August 2011	Krško	0–2	Nafta	Krško
20:00 CEST		Report	Lulić 60' (o.g.); Polareczki 66'	Stadium: Matija Gubec Stadium; Attendance: 200; Referee: Davor Drečnik

24 August 2011	Britof	1–2	Triglav	Britof
17:00 CEST	Velkoski 4'	Report	Gaberšček 28'; Jelar 43'	Stadium: NK Britof Stadium; Attendance: 300; Referee: Asmir Sagrković

24 August 2011	Malečnik	1–2	Interblock	Malečnik
17:00 CEST	Dvoršak 39'	Report	Grabić 61', 80'	Stadium: Berl Sports Center; Attendance: 200; Referee: Vojko Goričan

24 August 2011	Krka	3–3 (a.e.t.) (8–9 p)	Tolmin	Novo Mesto
17:00 CEST	Šahinović 86'; Fabjan 90+2' (pen.); Brulc 106'	Report	Kalaković 62'; Jarc 67'; Mrak 110'	Stadium: Portoval; Attendance: 100; Referee: Sašo Habjanič

24 August 2011	Portorož Piran	1–6	Šenčur	Piran
17:00 CEST	Šabanagić 62'	Report	Brezarič 2'; Čatić 18'; Babić 25' (pen.); Narobe 83', 86'; Aljančič 90'	Stadium: Pod Obzidjem Stadium; Attendance: 60; Referee: Mitja Žganec

24 August 2011	Limbuš-Pekre	0–6	Zavrč	Pekre
17:00 CEST		Report	Marinič 11'; Šnajder 33'; Marinič 63'; Čeh 83', 90'; Murat 86'	Stadium: Pod Grajskim gričem Attendance: 200; Referee: Andrej Tratnjek

24 August 2011	Hotiza	0–5	Gorica	Hotiza
17:00 CEST		Report	Arčon 2', 15', 82'; Jogan 26', 31' (pen.)	Stadium: Hotiza Sports Park; Attendance: 300; Referee: Gregor Gostenčnik

24 August 2011	Ilirska Bistrica	1–2	Rudar Velenje	Ilirska Bistrica
17:00 CEST	Brozina 40'	Report	Majcen 20'; Djokić 32'	Stadium: Trnovo Sports Centre; Attendance: 250; Referee: Dragoslav Perić

24 August 2011	Grad	1–3	Celje	Grad
17:00 CEST	Krpič 47'	Report	Bakarić 43'; Krljanović 45'; Šmitran 89'	Stadium: Igrišče Pod gradom Attendance: 250; Referee: Peter Šart

24 August 2011	Veržej	2–3	Odranci	Veržej
17:00 CEST	Fajdiga 25' (pen.), 80'	Report	Žerdin 5', 30', 44'	Stadium: Čistina; Attendance: 250; Referee: Emir Huselja

== Round of 16 ==
The matches took place on 6 and 14 September 2011. Maribor played their match on 8 October due to Europa League group stage matches.

6 September 2011	Triglav Kranj	0–1	Celje	Kranj
16:30 CEST		Report	Močivnik 12'	Stadium: Stanko Mlakar Stadium; Attendance: 250; Referee: Boris Tošeski

14 September 2011	Šenčur	1–0	Nafta	Šenčur
16:00 CEST	Čatić 73'	Report		Stadium: Šenčur Sports Park; Attendance: 250; Referee: Mitja Žganec

14 September 2011	Odranci	0–7	Interblock	Odranci
16:00 CEST		Report	Klebčar 5'; Žitko 13'; Hauschen 22', 30', 38', 49'; Mušić 83'	Stadium: Odranci Sports Park; Attendance: 200; Referee: Emir Huselja

14 September 2011	NK Šentjur	0–10	Rudar Velenje	Šentjur
16:00 CEST		Report	Črnčič 5', 25'; Podlogar 7'; Bratanović 30'; Trifković 37'; Klinar 47', 72'; Žinko 67' (pen.); Bizjak 70', 86'	Stadium: Šentjur Sport Park; Attendance: 100; Referee: Roman Glažar

14 September 2011	Zavrč	5–0	Domžale	Zavrč
16:00 CEST	Šnajder 20'; Murat 34'; Letonja 49', 56'; Veselič 78'	Report		Stadium: Zavrč Sports Park; Attendance: 350; Referee: Vojko Goričan

14 September 2011	Tolmin	1–2	Gorica	Tolmin
16:00 CEST	Zornik 63'	Report	Jogan 45'; Vicente 60'	Stadium: Brajda; Attendance: 600; Referee: Aleksander Likič

14 September 2011	Koper	2–0	Olimpija	Koper
16:00 CEST	Bubanja 39'; Struna 76'	Report		Stadium: Bonifika Stadium; Attendance: 700; Referee: Bojan Mertik

8 October 2011	Adria	0–2	Maribor	Miren
15:30 CEST		Report	Lesjak 21'; Volaš 55'	Stadium: Pri Štantu Stadium; Attendance: 700; Referee: Andrej Žnidaršič

== Quarter-finals ==
The first legs were played on 18, 19 and 26 October 2011, and the second legs were played on 25 and 26 October and 16 November 2011.

=== First legs ===
18 October 2011	Rudar Velenje	2–1	Gorica	Velenje
18:00 CEST	Klinar 4'; Rotman 32'	Report	Martinović 90+3'	Stadium: Ob Jezeru Stadium; Attendance: 600; Referee: Dejan Balažič

19 October 2011	Interblock	2–0	Celje	Ljubljana
15:00 CEST	Šporar 52'; Klebčar 89'	Report		Stadium: ŽŠD Ljubljana Stadium; Referee: Nejc Kajtazović

19 October 2011	Šenčur	0–0	Koper	Šenčur
15:00 CEST		Report		Stadium: Šenčur Sports Park; Attendance: 300; Referee: Gregor Gostenčnik

26 October 2011	Zavrč	3–3	Maribor	Zavrč
15:00 CEST	Lenart 14'; Murat 28'; Šnajder 50'	Report	Filipović 32'; Velikonja 55' (pen.); Jelić 72'	Stadium: Zavrč Sports Park; Attendance: 1,500; Referee: Mitja Žganec

=== Second legs ===
25 October 2011	Gorica	1–1 (2–3 agg.)	Rudar Velenje	Nova Gorica
18:00 CEST	Žigon 76'	Report	Žinko 22'	Stadium: Nova Gorica Sports Park; Attendance: 250; Referee: Slavko Vinčić

26 October 2011	Celje	7–0 (7–2 agg.)	Interblock	Celje
17:00 CEST	Akakpo 10'; Močivnik 22'; Firer 33', 65'; Bezjak 80'; Žurej 82'; Đaković 90'	Report		Stadium: Arena Petrol; Attendance: 500; Referee: Damir Skomina

2 November 2011	Koper	2–2 (2–2a agg.)	Šenčur	Koper
17:00 CET	Aljančič 36' (o.g.); Blažič 72'	Report	Pavlin 31'; Kotnik 78'	Stadium: Bonifika Stadium; Attendance: 600; Referee: Bojan Mertik

16 November 2011	Maribor	1–0 (4–3 agg.)	Zavrč	Maribor
18:00 CET	Velikonja 76'	Report		Stadium: Ljudski vrt Attendance: 4,500; Referee: Nejc Kajtazović

== Semi-finals ==
=== First legs ===
11 April 2012	Šenčur	1–1	Celje	Šenčur
17:00 CEST	Pavlin 47'	Report	Verbič 86'	Stadium: Šenčur Sports Park; Attendance: 600; Referee: Davor Drečnik

11 April 2012	Rudar Velenje	2–4	Maribor	Velenje
18:00 CEST	Črnčič 22'; Majcen 82'	Report	Velikonja 17', 61'; Mejač 58'; Ibraimi 65'	Stadium: Ob Jezeru Stadium; Attendance: 1,400; Referee: Matej Jug

=== Second legs ===
18 April 2012	Celje	1–1 (2–2 agg.) (8–7 p)	Šenčur	Celje
16:30 CEST	Žurej 89'	Report	Kotnik 56'	Stadium: Arena Petrol; Attendance: 2,100; Referee: Dejan Balažič
	Penalties
	Verbič (penalty scored); Bezjak (penalty scored); Medved (penalty scored); Krljanović (penalty scored); Krajcer (penalty scored); Centrih (penalty scored); Gobec (penalty scored); Kotnik (penalty scored)		(penalty scored) Božičić; (penalty scored) Aljančič; (penalty scored) Čatić; (penalty scored) Bunderla; (penalty scored) Košnik; (penalty scored) Kern; (penalty scored) Rant Roos

18 April 2012	Maribor	4–2 (8–4 agg.)	Rudar Velenje	Maribor
17:30 CEST	Berić 10'; Velikonja 18', 81'; Tavares 90'	Report	Rotman 9'; Klinar 37'	Stadium: Ljudski vrt Attendance: 2,000; Referee: Dragoslav Perić

== Final ==
23 May 2012
20:45 CEST

Celje	2–2 (a.e.t.)	Maribor
Romih 36'; Verbič 92'	Report	Volaš 46'; Črnic 99'
Penalties
Verbič (penalty missed); Gobec (penalty scored); Bezjak (penalty missed); Romih (penalty scored); Centrih (penalty missed)	2–3	(penalty missed) Cvijanović; (penalty scored) Rajčević; (penalty scored) Volaš; (penalty missed) Mejač; (penalty scored) Tavares

Stožice, Ljubljana
Attendance: 4,132
Referee: Matej Jug
