= 2011 Slovenian Supercup =

- Event: 2011 Slovenian Supercup
Maribor	Domžale
1	2
- Date: 8 July 2011
- Venue: Ljudski vrt, Maribor
- Referee: Matej Jug
- Attendance: 2,500

The 2011 Slovenian Supercup was the seventh edition of the Slovenian Supercup, an annual football match contested by the winners of the previous season's Slovenian PrvaLiga and Slovenian Cup competitions. The match was played on 8 July 2011, in Ljudski vrt stadium between 2010–11 Slovenian PrvaLiga winners Maribor and 2010–11 Slovenian Football Cup winners Domžale. Both teams contested for their second Supercup title.

== Background ==
The match was played by the best two teams of the 2010–11 season. During the course of that season Maribor was a league champion with Domžale being the only serious contender through most of the season, eventually finishing as runners up. The two teams were the only ones in the league that earned 20 or more victories, with Maribor achieving 21 and Domžale 20. In addition, both teams were part of the Slovenian cup final, held at Stožice stadium in Ljubljana and won by Domžale with the score 4–3 after regulation. The match is arguably one of the best Slovenian cup final ever held, since the competition was first introduced during the 1991–92 season.

== Match details ==
8 July 2011
20:45 CEST

Maribor	1–2	Domžale
Ibraimi 59'	Report	Juninho 9'; Knezović 51'

Ljudski vrt, Maribor
Attendance: 2,500
Referee: Matej Jug

Maribor	Domžale

MARIBOR:
GK	12	(Slovenia) Marko Pridigar
RB	6	(Slovenia) Martin Milec
CB	4	(Slovenia) Jovan Vidović	(yellow card) 90+3'
CB	26	(Slovenia) Aleksander Rajčević
LB	28	(Slovenia) Mitja Viler
RM	8	(Croatia) Dejan Mezga
CM	5	(Slovenia) Željko Filipović	(substituted off) 70'
CM	70	(Slovenia) Aleš Mertelj (c)
LM	10	(North Macedonia) Agim Ibraimi	61'
FW	17	(Slovenia) Dalibor Volaš	(substituted off) 46'
FW	32	(Slovenia) Robert Berić	(substituted off) 81'
Substitutes:
GK	13	(Slovenia) Matej Radan
DF	7	(Slovenia) Aleš Mejač
DF	44	(Brazil) Arghus
MF	20	(Slovenia) Goran Cvijanović	(substituted in) 70'
FW	9	(Brazil) Marcos Tavares	(substituted in) 46'
FW	11	(Slovenia) Etien Velikonja	(substituted in) 81'
FW	61	(Slovenia) Dragan Jelić
Manager:
(Slovenia) Darko Milanič

DOMŽALE:
GK	41	(Slovenia) Nejc Vidmar
RB	32	(Slovenia) Luka Elsner (c)
CB	13	(Croatia) Ivan Knezović	51'
CB	15	(Slovenia) Darko Zec
LB	87	(Slovenia) Tadej Apatič	(yellow card) 45'
RM	7	(Bosnia and Herzegovina) Dalibor Teinović
CM	25	(Brazil) Juninho	9'
CM	10	(Slovenia) Lucas Mario Horvat
LM	28	(Slovenia) Dejan Gerič	(substituted off) 46'
FW	89	(Slovenia) Slobodan Vuk	(substituted off) 71'
FW	9	(Germany) Florent Aziri	(substituted off) 58'
Substitutes:
GK	1	(Slovenia) Izidor Balažič
DF	3	(Slovenia) Darko Topić
DF	4	(Slovenia) Lamin Diallo
DF	18	(Slovenia) Miroslav Grbić	(substituted in) 46'
MF	16	(Slovenia) Rudi Vancaš Požeg
FW	14	(Slovenia) Dejan Zadnikar	(substituted in) 58'
FW	23	(Slovenia) Jernej Smukavec	(substituted in) 71'
Manager:
(Slovenia) Darko Birjukov

Man of the Match:
(Brazil) Juninho (Domžale)

Assistant referees:
Milan Kogej
Matej Žunič
Fourth official:
Andrej Tratnjek
Delegate:
Aldo Knafelc

Slovenian Supercup
2011 Winners
Domžale
2nd title

== See also ==
- 2010–11 Slovenian PrvaLiga
- 2010–11 Slovenian Football Cup
- 2011–12 NK Maribor season
