= Jernej =

Jernej is a Slovenian form of the name Bartholomew. The short form is Nejc.

== Persons with this name ==
- Janez Jernej Bosio, politician
- Jernej of Loka, painter
- Jernej Abramič, Slovenian slalom canoer
- Jernej Damjan (born 1983), Slovenian ski-jumper
- Jernej Godec, Slovenian swimmer
- Jernej Jurše, Slovenian rower
- Jernej Koblar (born 1971), Slovenian alpine skier
- Jernej Kolenko, Slovenian motorcycle speedway rider
- Jernej Kopitar (1780–1844), Slovenian linguist and philologist
- Jernej Kruder, Slovenian rock climber
- Jernej Reberšak, Slovenian alpine skier
- Jernej Slivnik, Slovenian paralympic skier
- Jernej Smukavec, Slovenian footballer
- Jernej Šugman, Slovenian actor
- Jernej Vrtovec, Slovenian politician
- Jernej Weiss, Slovenian musicologist, associate professor and music critic
- Jernej Župančič Regent, Slovenian sprint canoer
- Jernej Županič, Slovenian writer and translator

== Fictional characters with this name ==
- Hlapec Jernej, the main character in a novel by Ivan Cankar

== See also ==
- Sveti Jernej (disambiguation)
