= 2011–12 Slovenian PrvaLiga =

Slovenian PrvaLiga
- Season: 2011–12
- Dates: 16 July 2011 – 20 May 2012
- Champions: Maribor (10th title)
- Relegated: Nafta
- Champions League: Maribor
- Europa League: Olimpija; Mura 05; Celje (cup finalists)
- Matches: 180
- Goals: 491 (2.73 per match)
- Best player: Dare Vršič
- Top goalscorer: Dare Vršič (22 goals)
- Biggest home win: Maribor 8–0 Triglav
- Biggest away win: Nafta 0–6 Olimpija
- Highest scoring: Maribor 8–0 Triglav
- Longest winning run: 7 games Maribor
- Longest unbeaten run: 14 games Maribor
- Longest winless run: 18 games Nafta
- Longest losing run: 7 games Triglav
- Highest attendance: 12,500; Maribor 2–2 Olimpija
- Lowest attendance: 100; Triglav 1–1 Nafta
- Total attendance: 246,290
- Average attendance: 1,368

The 2011–12 Slovenian PrvaLiga was the 21st season of the Slovenian PrvaLiga, the top-tier football league in Slovenia. The season began on 16 July 2011 and ended on 26 May 2012, with a winter break in effect between 4 December 2011 and 2 March 2012. Maribor were the defending champions, having won their ninth title the previous season.

== Teams ==
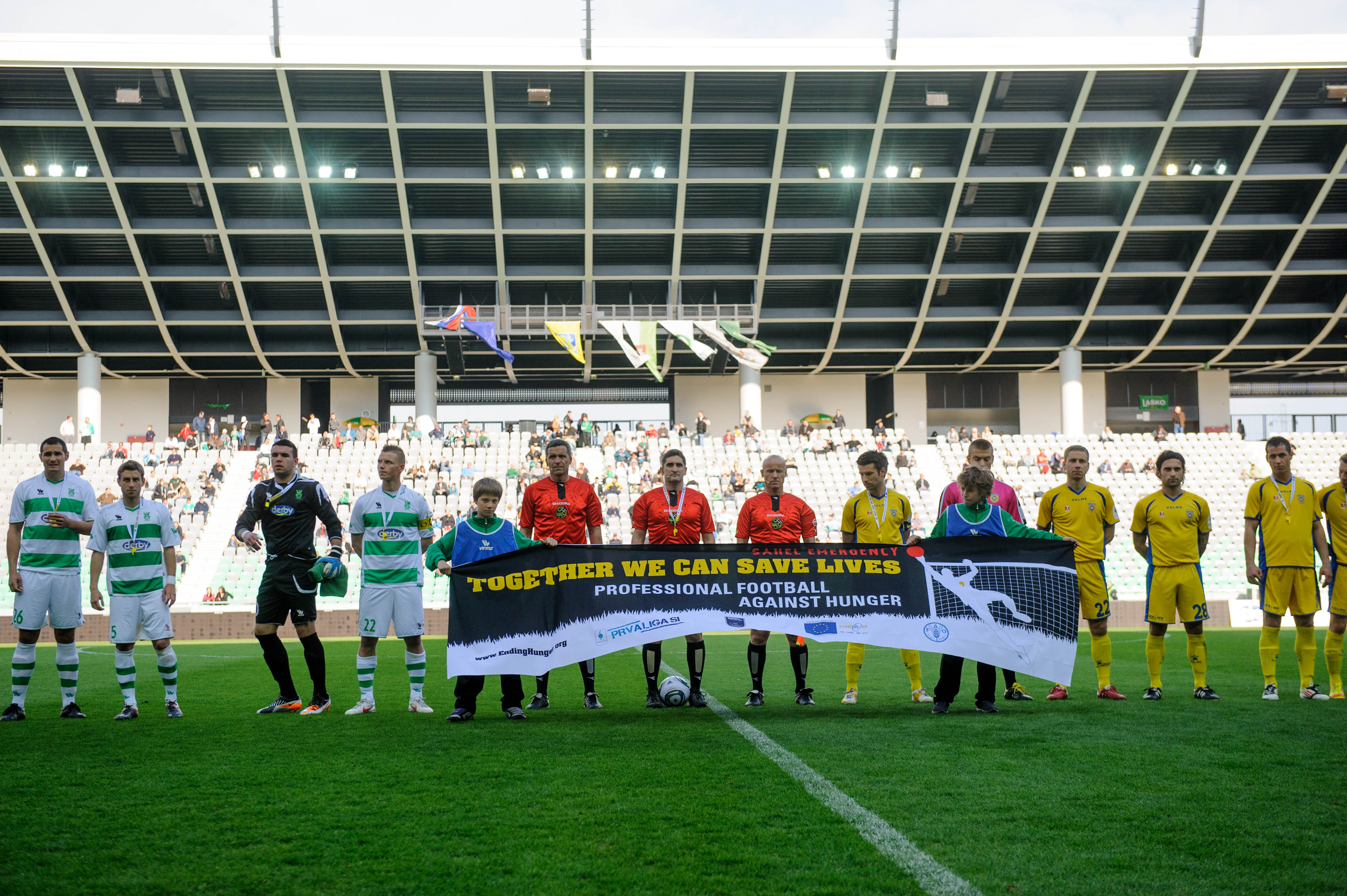
Olimpija – Domžale match at Stožice Stadium

Primorje were directly relegated at the end of the 2010–11 season to the Slovenian Second League after the last-place finish. They were replaced by the 2010–11 Slovenian Second League fourth-placed team, Mura 05, who participated in the competition for the first time in their history. Mura 05 received and accepted an invitation to join the league after Aluminij, Interblock and Dravinja – who finished in the top three places – all declined promotion due to financial reasons.

With both Nafta and Mura 05 participating in the 2011–12 edition, Prekmurje region had two teams in the top division for the first time since the 1999–2000 season.

=== Stadia and locations ===
Location of teams in the 2011–12 Slovenian PrvaLiga

Club	City / Town	Stadium	Capacity^{1}	Kit maker
Celje	Celje	Arena Petrol	13,059	Joma
Domžale	Domžale	Domžale Sports Park	3,100	Kelme
Gorica	Nova Gorica	Nova Gorica Sports Park	3,100	Joma
Koper	Koper	Bonifika Stadium	4,047	Lotto
Maribor	Maribor	Ljudski vrt	12,702	Adidas
Mura 05	Murska Sobota	Fazanerija City Stadium	3,782	Nike
Nafta	Lendava	Lendava Sports Park	2,000	Zeus
Olimpija	Ljubljana	Stožice Stadium	16,038	Virma
Rudar	Velenje	Ob Jezeru	1,864	Joma
Triglav	Kranj	Stanko Mlakar	2,060	Royal Sport

^{1}Seating capacity only. Some stadiums (e.g. Mura 05, Nafta, Rudar) also have standing areas.

== League table ==
Pos	Team	Pld	W	D	L	GF	GA	GD	Pts	Qualification or relegation
1	Maribor (C)	36	26	7	3	88	35	+53	85	Qualification to Champions League second qualifying round
2	Olimpija	36	19	8	9	60	38	+22	65	Qualification to Europa League first qualifying round
3	Mura 05	36	18	5	13	52	46	+6	59	Qualification to Europa League first qualifying round
4	Koper	36	16	10	10	48	35	+13	58	
5	Gorica	36	14	11	11	49	37	+12	53	
6	Rudar	36	11	10	15	55	54	+1	43	
7	Domžale	36	11	7	18	39	52	−13	40	
8	Celje	36	9	10	17	44	56	−12	37	Qualification to Europa League first qualifying round (Note: Celje lost to Maribor in the final of 2011–12 Slovenian Football Cup competition; since Maribor have qualified for the Champions League, Celje will enter the first qualifying round of UEFA Europa League.)
9	Triglav Kranj	36	9	6	21	22	67	−45	33	Qualification to relegation play-offs
10	Nafta (R)	36	5	10	21	34	71	−37	25	Relegation to Slovenian Second League

Source: PrvaLiga (in Slovene)
Rules for classification: 1) points; 2) goal difference; 3) number of goals scored.
(C) Champions; (R) Relegated

=== Positions by round ===
Team ╲ Round	1	2	3	4	5	6	7	8	9	10	11	12	13	14	15	16	17	18	19	20	21	22	23	24	25	26	27	28	29	30	31	32	33	34	35	36
Maribor	3	2	2	1	1	1	1	1	1	1	1	1	1	1	1	1	1	1	1	1	1	1	1	1	1	1	1	1	1	1	1	1	1	1	1	1
Olimpija	10	9	5	5	3	3	2	3	2	2	2	2	2	3	2	3	2	2	2	2	3	2	2	2	2	2	2	2	2	2	2	2	2	2	2	2
Mura 05	5	3	4	8	9	9	9	8	6	6	6	6	6	5	6	7	8	6	5	5	4	4	3	4	4	4	3	4	5	4	3	3	4	4	4	3
Koper	8	8	10	10	10	10	10	9	9	10	10	10	9	9	8	8	7	8	8	7	6	7	6	6	5	5	5	5	4	5	5	4	3	3	3	4
Gorica	6	7	9	6	4	4	3	4	4	4	4	3	3	2	3	2	3	3	3	3	2	3	4	3	3	3	4	3	3	3	4	5	5	5	5	5
Rudar	9	4	6	3	6	6	6	5	5	3	3	4	4	4	4	5	5	5	4	4	5	5	5	5	6	6	6	6	6	6	6	6	6	6	6	6
Domžale	2	1	1	2	2	2	4	2	3	5	5	5	5	7	5	4	4	4	6	8	8	6	7	8	8	7	7	7	7	7	7	8	8	8	7	7
Celje	1	5	3	4	5	5	7	7	8	9	7	7	7	6	7	6	6	7	7	6	7	8	8	7	7	8	8	8	8	8	8	7	7	7	8	8
Triglav Kranj	4	6	9	9	7	8	5	6	7	7	9	9	10	10	10	10	10	10	10	10	10	10	10	10	10	10	10	10	10	10	10	10	10	9	9	9
Nafta	7	10	7	7	8	7	8	10	10	8	8	8	8	8	9	9	9	9	9	9	9	9	9	9	9	9	9	9	9	9	9	9	9	10	10	10

Leader
2nd place
3rd place

Source: PrvaLiga (in Slovene)

=== Relegation play-offs ===
The ninth-placed team of the 2011–12 PrvaLiga, Triglav Kranj, played a two-legged relegation play-off against the runners-up of the 2011–12 Slovenian Second League, Dob. Although Triglav lost the two-legged play-off 6–0 on aggregate, they retained their place in PrvaLiga as Dob declined promotion due to financial reasons.

2 June 2012
17:30 CEST

Triglav Kranj	0–2	Dob
	Report	Vuk 35'; Kukavica 42'

Stanko Mlakar Stadium, Kranj
Attendance: 1,500
Referee: Damir Skomina
6 June 2012
17:00 CEST

Dob	4–0	Triglav Kranj
Vuk 12', 21'; Kunstelj 45' (pen.), 54'	Report

Dob Sports Park, Dob
Attendance: 1,000
Referee: Davor Drečnik

== Results ==
Every team plays four times against their opponents, twice at home and twice on the road, for a total of 36 matches.

=== First half of the season ===
Home \ Away	CEL	DOM	GOR	KOP	MAR	MUR	NAF	OLI	RUD	TRI
Celje		3–0	1–2	2–0	2–3	0–1	1–1	0–0	2–3	1–2
Domžale	1–0		0–3	1–1	1–4	2–1	2–1	0–1	2–3	2–0
Gorica	2–0	0–3		4–1	1–1	1–1	2–1	2–1	2–2	0–0
Koper	1–2	2–1	0–4		2–2	0–0	4–1	1–1	1–1	3–0
Maribor	5–2	0–0	2–1	2–1		6–0	0–2	2–2	2–1	2–0
Mura 05	4–0	1–1	1–0	1–0	1–3		0–2	4–2	0–0	0–1
Nafta	0–2	2–1	2–3	0–0	1–2	2–2		1–1	1–2	1–0
Olimpija	0–3	3–1	2–1	3–1	4–1	3–1	1–1		3–1	1–0
Rudar	3–3	0–2	1–0	0–1	0–3	1–0	2–4	2–2		5–0
Triglav Kranj	0–1	0–4	0–2	0–3	0–2	1–2	2–1	0–1	0–0	

Source: PrvaLiga (in Slovene)
Legend: Blue = home team win; Yellow = draw; Red = away team win.

=== Second half of the season ===
Home \ Away	CEL	DOM	GOR	KOP	MAR	MUR	NAF	OLI	RUD	TRI
Celje		0–2	0–0	0–4	1–2	1–3	1–1	1–2	1–1	3–0
Domžale	0–2		1–2	1–0	0–2	1–2	0–0	0–1	1–1	0–1
Gorica	1–1	0–0		0–1	0–0	1–2	3–1	2–3	4–1	1–1
Koper	0–0	2–1	0–0		2–2	3–1	2–0	2–0	3–1	0–1
Maribor	3–1	2–1	2–1	1–1		3–1	6–0	3–2	1–0	8–0
Mura 05	3–0	3–4	0–1	1–0	1–3		2–0	1–0	1–0	2–0
Nafta	1–3	0–2	1–1	1–2	0–3	0–3		0–6	1–1	1–2
Olimpija	0–0	2–0	1–2	0–1	1–2	3–1	1–0		2–1	0–0
Rudar	1–1	6–0	1–0	0–1	0–2	1–2	5–2	0–3		3–0
Triglav Kranj	4–3	1–1	2–0	0–2	2–1	0–3	1–1	0–2	1–5	

Source: PrvaLiga (in Slovene)
Legend: Blue = home team win; Yellow = draw; Red = away team win.

== Statistics ==
=== Top goalscorers ===
Rank	Player	Club	Goals
1	(Slovenia) Dare Vršič	Olimpija	22
2	(Bosnia and Herzegovina) Nusmir Fajić	Mura 05	20
3	(Slovenia) Vito Plut	Gorica	17
3	(Slovenia) Dalibor Volaš	Maribor	17
5	(Slovenia) Roman Bezjak	Celje	16
6	(Slovenia) Etien Velikonja	Maribor	14
7	(Bosnia and Herzegovina) Goran Galešić	Gorica	10
7	(Slovenia) Luka Majcen	Rudar	10
7	(Croatia) Dejan Mezga	Maribor	10
7	(Brazil) Marcos Tavares	Maribor	10

=== Hat-tricks ===
Player	For	Against	Result	Date
(Slovenia) Milan Osterc	Koper	Nafta	4–1	23 October 2011
(Slovenia) Dejan Djermanović	Olimpija	Nafta	6–0	3 March 2012
(Slovenia) Etien Velikonja	Maribor	Triglav	8–0	22 April 2012
(Slovenia) Matej Podlogar	Rudar	Nafta	5–2	20 May 2012

=== Average attendance ===
Rank	Club	Total attendance	Matches played	Average
1	Maribor	68,400	18	3,800
2	Mura 05	51,800	18	2,878
3	Olimpija Ljubljana	33,050	18	1,836
4	Nafta Lendava	18,000	18	1,000
5	Rudar Velenje	17,550	18	975
6	Koper	16,800	18	933
7	Celje	12,950	18	719
8	Domžale	10,150	18	564
9	Triglav	9,850	18	547
10	Gorica	7,740	18	430

== See also ==
- 2011 Slovenian Supercup
- 2011–12 Slovenian Football Cup
- 2011–12 Slovenian Second League
