= Dalibor Teinović =

Bosnian footballer

Dalibor Teinović Далибор Теиновић
Personal information
- Full name: Dalibor Teinović
- Date of birth: 22 March 1977 (age 49)
- Place of birth: Kotor Varoš, SFR Yugoslavia
- Height: 1.77 m (5 ft 9 1/2 in)
- Position: Midfielder

Youth career
- Mladost Kotor Varoš
- 1984–1994: Borac Banja Luka

Senior career*
Years	Team	Apps	(Gls)
1994–2001	Borac Banja Luka		
2001–2002	Šmartno	28	(4)
2002–2005	Maribor	84	(2)
2005–2006	Hapoel Petah Tikva	6	(0)
2006–2009	Primorje	94	(6)
2009–2012	Domžale	95	(6)
2012–2013	Borac Banja Luka	20	(1)
2015	Radomlje	12	(0)
2015	Dolomiti	3	(0)
2016	Šenčur	5	(0)

Managerial career
- 2018-: Ivančna Gorica
- * Club domestic league appearances and goals

Dalibor Teinović (Serbian Cyrillic: Далибор Теиновић; born 22 March 1977) is a retired Bosnian professional footballer.

== Honours ==
- Maribor
  - Slovenian PrvaLiga: 2002–03
  - Slovenian Cup: 2003–04
- Domžale
  - Slovenian Cup: 2010–11
  - Slovenian Supercup: 2011
