= Škerjanc =

Škerjanc is a surname. Notable people with the surname include:

- Davor Škerjanc (born 1986), Slovenian football midfielder
- Lucijan Marija Škerjanc (1900–1973), Slovene composer, pedagogue, conductor, musician, and writer
- Zoran Škerjanc (born 1964), retired Croatian football player
