= Nejc =

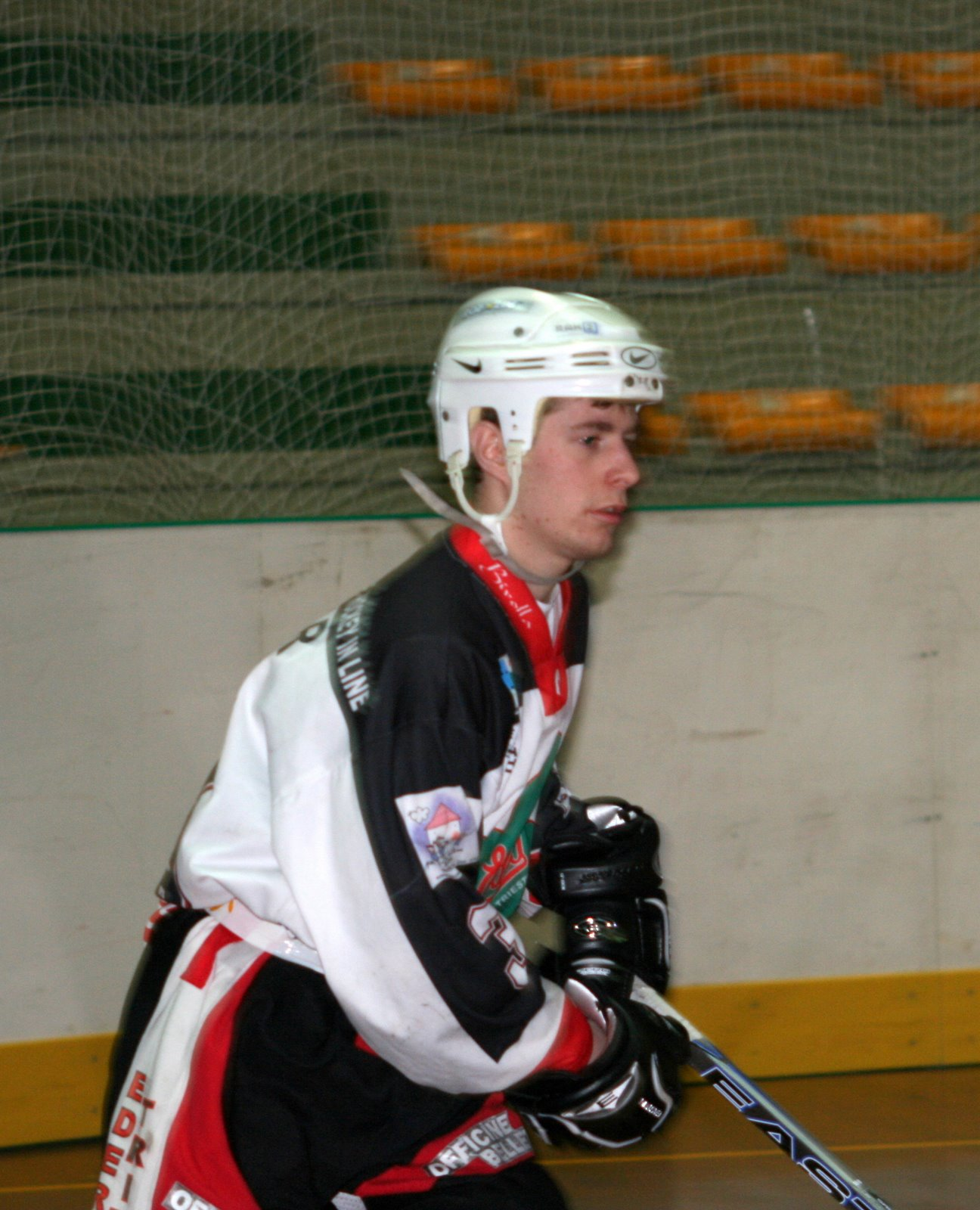
Nejc Sotlar, a Hockey player

Nejc is a Slovene masculine name, a diminutive of Jernej, Slovenian for Bartholomew. Notable people called Nejc include:

- Nejc Barič (born 1997), Slovene basketball player
- Nejc Brodar (born 1982), Slovene cross-country skier
- Nejc Cehte (born 1992), Slovene handball player
- Nejc Dežman (born 1992), Slovene ski jumper
- Nejc Gazvoda (born 1985), Slovene writer, screenwriter and director
- Nejc Kolman (born 1989), Slovene football player
- Nejc Križaj (born 1989), Slovene football midfielder
- Nejc Kuhar (born 1985), Slovene ski mountaineer
- Nejc Mevlja (born 1990), Slovene footballer
- Nejc Naraločnik (born 1999), Slovene alpine skier
- Nejc Pačnik (born 1990), Slovene accordion world-champion and accordion teacher
- Nejc Pečnik (born 1986), Slovene footballer
- Nejc Potokar (born 1988), Slovene footballer
- Nejc Praprotnik (born 1993), Slovene footballer
- Nejc Skubic (born 1989), Slovene footballer
- Nejc Vidmar (born 1989), Slovene footballer
- Nejc Žnidarčič (born 1984), Slovene canoeist

== See also ==
- Jernej
- Bartholomew
