= 2010–11 Slovenian Football Cup =

Tournament details
- Country: Slovenia
- Teams: 28

Final positions
- Champions: Domžale (1st title)
- Runners-up: Maribor

Tournament statistics
- Matches played: 33
- Goals scored: 114 (3.45 per match)
- Top goal scorer(s): Dalibor Volaš; Etien Velikonja (both 4 goals)

The 2010–11 Slovenian Football Cup was the 20th season of the Slovenian Football Cup, Slovenia's football knockout competition. Maribor were the defending champions, having won their sixth Slovenian Cup the previous season.

== Qualified clubs ==
=== 2009–10 Slovenian PrvaLiga members ===
- Celje
- Domžale
- Drava Ptuj
- Gorica
- Interblock
- Koper
- Maribor
- Nafta Lendava
- Olimpija
- Rudar Velenje

=== Qualified through MNZ Regional Cups ===
Winners and runners-up of the regional MNZ cups.

- MNZ Ljubljana: Krka, Dob
- MNZ Maribor: Dogoše, Malečnik
- MNZ Celje: Dravinja, Krško
- MNZ Koper: Postojna, Ankaran
- MNZ Nova Gorica: Primorje, Brda
- MNZ Murska Sobota: Mura 05, Tromejnik
- MNZ Lendava: Hotiza, Bistrica
- MNZG-Kranj: Triglav Kranj, Šenčur
- MNZ Ptuj: Aluminij, Zavrč

== First round ==
These matches took place on 24 and 25 August 2010.

24 August 2010	Malečnik	1–4	Domžale	Malečnik
16:30 CEST	Tišma 28'	Report	Smukavec 19'; Krcić 23'; Horvat 32'; Zatkovič 39'	Stadium: Berl Sports Centre; Attendance: 200; Referee: Andrej Žnidaršič

25 August 2010	Dravinja	1–0	Šenčur	Slovenske Konjice
16:30 CEST	Hankić 28'	Report		Stadium: ŠRC Dobrava; Attendance: 100; Referee: Miran Bukovec

25 August 2010	Hotiza	0–4	Interblock	Hotiza
16:30 CEST		Report	Fink 30'; Vida 45' (o.g.); Majcen 50'; Valenčič 70'	Stadium: Hotiza Sports Park; Attendance: 300; Referee: Roman Glažar

25 August 2010	Bistrica	2–4 (a.e.t.)	Aluminij	Srednja Bistrica
16:30 CEST	Kolarič 69'; Zver 76'	Report	Vračko 8', 45'; Godina 103' (o.g.); Pranjič 107'	Stadium: Bistrica Stadium; Attendance: 200; Referee: Emir Huselja

25 August 2010	Brda	2–4	Nafta	Dobrovo
16:30 CEST	Zovatto 41'; Šabec 79' (pen.)	Report	Vinko 29'; Vassiljev 42', 55' (pen.); Kokol 75'	Stadium: Vipolže Stadium; Attendance: 100; Referee: Davor Drečnik

25 August 2010	Krka	2–5	Ankaran	Novo Mesto
16:30 CEST	Juršič 14'; Škrbec 60'	Report	Valenčič 2'; Mačkovšek 5'; Mihalič 24'; Kramar 36' (o.g.), 39' (o.g.)	Stadium: Portoval; Attendance: 80; Referee: Nejc Kajtazović

25 August 2010	Tromejnik	1–3 (a.e.t.)	Rudar Velenje	Kuzma
16:30 CEST	Bokan 55'	Report	Djermanović 60'; Roj 107'; Mešić 117' (pen.)	Stadium: Kuzma Stadium; Attendance: 200; Referee: Gregor Gostenčnik

25 August 2010	Postojna	0–3	Triglav Kranj	Postojna
16:30 CEST		Report	Burgar 43'; Potokar 84'; Jelar 89'	Stadium: Postojna Sports Park; Attendance: 300; Referee: Dejan Balažič

25 August 2010	Drava Ptuj	2–4	Dob	Ptuj
16:30 CEST	Firer 78'; Matjašič 80'	Report	Vuk 19', 74'; Strahinič 31'; Smolnikar 76'	Stadium: Ptuj City Stadium; Attendance: 100; Referee: Bojan Mertik

25 August 2010	Dogoše	0–4	Primorje	Dogoše
16:30 CEST		Report	Živec 19', 63'; Lo Duca 58'; Letonja 61' (o.g.)	Stadium: Dogoše Stadium; Attendance: 350; Referee: Vojko Goričan

25 August 2010	Zavrč	4–3	Mura 05	Zavrč
16:30 CEST	Čeh 52' (pen.); Murko 60'; Antolič 76'; Šnajder 84'	Report	Bohar 13'; Sprečo 28'; Ramšak 90'	Stadium: Zavrč Sports Park; Attendance: 150; Referee: Peter Šart

25 August 2010	Krško	1–2	Celje	Krško
16:30 CEST	Salkić 90+3'	Report	Bezjak 28'; Zajc 90+2'	Stadium: Matija Gubec Stadium; Attendance: 350; Referee: Sašo Habjanič

== Second round ==
Gorica, Koper, Maribor and Olimpija received byes to this round. These matches took place on 14, 15 and 29 September 2010.

14 September 2010	Olimpija	2–0	Celje	Ljubljana
20:00 CEST	Šokota 59'; Zeljković 73'	Report		Stadium: Stožice Stadium; Attendance: 1,500; Referee: Bojan Mertik

15 September 2010	Aluminij	0–2	Gorica	Kidričevo
16:00 CEST		Report	Arčon 14'; Velikonja 50'	Stadium: Aluminij Sports Park; Attendance: 250; Referee: Dejan Balažič

15 September 2010	Zavrč	0–3	Nafta	Zavrč
16:00 CEST		Report	Dvorančič 18', 31', 36'	Stadium: Zavrč Sports Park; Attendance: 350; Referee: Andrej Žnidaršič

15 September 2010	Ankaran	1–6	Domžale	Ankaran
16:00 CEST	Mihailovič 57'	Report	Juninho 10'; Vidović 38'; Zec 45', 60'; Zatkovič 47'; Šimunović 81'	Stadium: ŠRC Katerina; Attendance: 150; Referee: Gregor Gostenčnik

15 September 2010	Dravinja	0–1 (a.e.t.)	Koper	Slovenske Konjice
16:00 CEST		Report	Bubanja 112'	Stadium: ŠRC Dobrava; Attendance: 450; Referee: Boris Tošeski

15 September 2010	Triglav Kranj	2–1	Rudar Velenje	Kranj
16:00 CEST	Korun 49' (o.g.); Ovčina 82'	Report	Tolimir 74'	Stadium: Stanko Mlakar Stadium; Attendance: 300; Referee: Andrej Tratnjek

15 September 2010	Dob	1–1 (a.e.t.) (4–5 p)	Maribor	Dob
16:00 CEST	Kunstelj 32'	Report	Volaš 79'	Stadium: Dob Sports Park; Attendance: 600; Referee: Vojko Goričan
	Penalties
	Mohar (penalty scored); Mešanović (penalty scored); Kovjenić (penalty scored); Kujovič (penalty scored)		(penalty scored) Volaš; (penalty scored) Tavares; (penalty scored) Bunderla; (penalty scored) Džinić; (penalty scored) Rajčević

29 September 2010	Interblock	3–2 (a.e.t.)	Primorje	Ljubljana
15:30 CEST	Majcen 54'; Fink 61'; Vrhunc 107'	Report	Marijanović 45'; Kremenović 47'	Stadium: ŽŠD Ljubljana Stadium; Attendance: 100; Referee: Jože Vehar

== Quarter-finals ==
The first legs took place on 20 October 2010 and the second legs took place on 27 October and 3 November 2010.

=== First legs ===
20 October 2010	Triglav Kranj	1–0	Koper	Kranj
15:00 CEST	Burgar 31' (pen.)	Report		Stadium: Stanko Mlakar Stadium; Attendance: 300; Referee: Slavko Vinčić

20 October 2010	Interblock	4–2	Gorica	Ljubljana
15:00 CEST	Majcen 33'; Valenčič 79', 84'; Podlogar 87'	Report	Velikonja 14' (pen.), 60'	Stadium: ŽŠD Ljubljana Stadium; Attendance: 150; Referee: Jože Vehar

20 October 2010	Domžale	0–2	Olimpija	Domžale
18:00 CEST		Report	Rujović 51'; Stojanović 90+1'	Stadium: Domžale Sports Park; Attendance: 900; Referee: Miran Bukovec

20 October 2010	Nafta	1–1	Maribor	Lendava
18:00 CEST	Pavel 56'	Report	Volaš 65'	Stadium: Lendava Sports Park; Attendance: 1,200; Referee: Davor Drečnik

=== Second legs ===
27 October 2010	Gorica	0–0 (2–4 agg.)	Interblock	Nova Gorica
17:00 CEST		Report		Stadium: Nova Gorica Sports Park; Attendance: 500; Referee: Slavko Vinčić

27 October 2010	Olimpija	0–4 (2–4 agg.)	Domžale	Ljubljana
18:00 CEST		Report	Zatkovič 12'; Pekič 47'; Šimunović 58'; Apatič 90' (pen.)	Stadium: Stožice Stadium; Attendance: 1,000; Referee: Dragoslav Perić

27 October 2010	Maribor	4–0 (5–1 agg.)	Nafta	Maribor
18:00 CEST	Tavares 9'; Dodlek 38'; Volaš 52' (pen.); Mertelj 70'	Report		Stadium: Ljudski vrt Attendance: 1,000; Referee: Boris Tošeski

3 November 2010	Koper	3–0 (3–1 agg.)	Triglav Kranj	Koper
18:00 CET	Osterc 15'; Smolej 53' (o.g.); Bubanja 78'	Report		Stadium: Bonifika Stadium; Attendance: 1,200; Referee: Sašo Habjanič

== Semi-finals ==
The four winners from the previous round competed in this round. The first legs took place on 20 April 2011 and the second legs took place on 26 April 2011.

=== First legs ===
20 April 2011	Interblock	0–0	Domžale	Ljubljana
17:00 CEST		Report		Stadium: ŽŠD Ljubljana Stadium; Attendance: 500; Referee: Boris Tošeski

20 April 2011	Koper	1–1	Maribor	Koper
20:00 CEST	Osterc 10'	Report	Mezga 89' (pen.)	Stadium: Bonifika Stadium; Attendance: 1,500; Referee: Matej Jug

=== Second legs ===
26 April 2011	Domžale	2–0 (2–0 agg.)	Interblock	Domžale
18:00 CEST	Juninho 57'; Smukavec 81'	Report		Stadium: Domžale Sports Park; Attendance: 600; Referee: Dragoslav Perić

26 April 2011	Maribor	1–0 (2–1 agg.)	Koper	Maribor
18:00 CEST	Velikonja 55'	Report		Stadium: Ljudski vrt Attendance: 4,500; Referee: Vojko Goričan

== Final ==
25 May 2011
20:45 CEST

Domžale	4–3	Maribor
Juninho 22'; Pekič 38', 78'; Šimunović 51'	Report	Filipović 15'; Berič 55'; Mezga 63' (pen.)

Stožice, Ljubljana
Attendance: 6,000
Referee: Damir Skomina
