= Janez Aljančič =

Slovenian footballer (born 1982)

Personal information
- Full name: Janez Aljančič
- Date of birth: 29 July 1982 (age 44)
- Place of birth: Ljubljana, SFR Yugoslavia
- Height: 1.84 m (6 ft 0 in)
- Position: Defender

Youth career
- 1987–1996: Naklo
- 1996–2001: Triglav Kranj

Senior career*
Years	Team	Apps	(Gls)
2000–2002	Triglav Kranj	29	(0)
2002–2005	Olimpija	58	(1)
2005	Ljubljana	8	(0)
2005–2006	Triglav Kranj	24	(2)
2006–2009	Domžale	84	(4)
2009–2010	Maribor	22	(0)
2011–2015	Šenčur	83	(1)
Total		308	(8)

International career^{‡}
2006	Slovenia	1	(0)
- * Club domestic league appearances and goals as of 25 October 2015 ‡ National team caps and goals as of 17 December 2008

Janez Aljančič (born 29 July 1982 in Ljubljana) is a retired Slovenian football defender.

== International career ==
Aljančič made his debut for Slovenia in an August 2006 friendly match at home against Israel, coming on as a 46th-minute substitute for Boštjan Cesar. It remained his sole international appearance.

== Honours ==
=== Olimpija ===
- Slovenian Cup: 2002–03

=== Domžale ===
- Slovenian PrvaLiga: 2006–07, 2007–08
- Supercup: 2007

=== Maribor ===
- Slovenian Cup: 2009–10
