= Jernej Weiss =

Slovenian artist

Jernej Weiss (born 1980) is a Slovenian musicologist, associate professor and music critic.

== Biography ==
After completing his studies at the Department of Musicology, Faculty of Arts, University of Ljubljana (1999–2002) and at the Institute of Musicology of the Faculty of Arts, University of Regensburg (2002–03), he was employed at the above-mentioned department as a research fellow. In 2009 he obtained his Ph.D. degree in musicology with a dissertation entitled, The Role of Czech musicians in the musical culture of Slovenia in the period between 1861 and 1914.

From 2005 to 2009 he worked as an assistant at the Department of Musicology of the Faculty of Arts in Ljubljana, and in 2009 was promoted to assistant professor at the Academy of Music in Ljubljana, and at the Faculty of Education of the University of Maribor, where he is currently lecturing as an associate professor.

== Work ==
His research work is focused on issues related to music from the 19th century to the present, particularly music that in one way or another focuses on the Slovenian and Czech cultural environments. His bibliography comprises numerous contributions to leading domestic and some foreign musicological publications, such as De musica disserenda, Music & Letters, Musicologica Austriaca, etc. He has actively participated in numerous domestic and foreign scientific conferences (among others at Masaryk University in Brno, Newcastle University, Bristol University etc.) and was a guest lecturer on the Institute of musicology of the University of Graz and School of Music of the Cardiff University.

He has left a noticeable mark on both domestic and foreign music societies. He is member of one of the oldest musicological societies in the world, the Royal Musical Association. In 2007 he was elected, and in 2011 re-elected, Vice-President of the Richard Wagner Society Ljubljana, where he was Editor-in-Chief of Opera magazine from 2009 to 2011. In 2011 he has been active as Editor-in-Chief of the principal Slovenian musicological publication, Musicological Annual (Muzikološki zbornik). In the same year he was elected to the Expert Council of the Slovenian National Theatre in Maribor (SNG Maribor). He is the author of two scientific monographs: Emerik Beran (1868–1940): samotni svetovljan (The Lonely Cosmopolitan, 2008) and Hans Gerstner (1851–1939): življenje za glasbo (A Life Dedicated to Music, 2010).
