= Nejc Vidmar =

Slovenian footballer (born 1989)

Personal information
- Date of birth: 31 March 1989 (age 37)
- Place of birth: Ljubljana, SFR Yugoslavia
- Height: 1.87 m (6 ft 2 in)
- Position: Goalkeeper

Youth career
- 2000–2004: Krim
- 2004–2005: Olimpija
- 2005–2008: Domžale

Senior career*
| Years | Team | Apps | (Gls) |
| 2008–2015 | Domžale | 181 | (0) |
| 2008–2009 | → Kamnik (loan) | 16 | (0) |
| 2016–2022 | Olimpija Ljubljana | 93 | (0) |
| 2022 | → Ionikos (loan) | 1 | (0) |
| 2022–2023 | Mura | 0 | (0) |
| 2023–2024 | Slovan | 3 | (0) |

International career
| 2009–2010 | Slovenia U20 | 3 | (0) |
| 2009 | Slovenia U21 | 4 | (0) |
| 2019 | Slovenia B | 1 | (0) |
- * Club domestic league appearances and goals

Nejc Vidmar (born 31 March 1989) is a Slovenian retired footballer who played as a goalkeeper.

== Club career ==
Vidmar started his senior career with Domžale.

== International career ==
Vidmar received his first call-up to the senior Slovenia squad for the UEFA Euro 2016 play-off against Ukraine in November 2015.

== Honours ==
Domžale

- Slovenian Cup: 2010–11
- Slovenian Supercup: 2011

Olimpija Ljubljana

- Slovenian PrvaLiga: 2015–16, 2017–18
- Slovenian Cup: 2017–18, 2018–19, 2020–21
