= Darko Zec =

Slovenian footballer (born 1989)

Personal information
- Date of birth: 21 February 1989 (age 37)
- Place of birth: Ljubljana, SFR Yugoslavia
- Height: 1.94 m (6 ft 4 in)
- Position: Defender

Team information
- Current team: Dob

Youth career
- 1995–2005: Olimpija
- 2005–2007: Domžale

Senior career*
Years	Team	Apps	(Gls)
2007–2016	Domžale	165	(9)
2016–2017	Rudar Velenje	24	(2)
2017–2018	Triglav Kranj	1	(0)
2018	Radnik Bijeljina	7	(0)
2018–2020	Bravo	29	(1)
2020–2022	Ilirija 1911	31	(2)
2022	SAK Klagenfurt	8	(1)
2023–2024	DSG Sele/Zell	33	(7)
2024–2025	SV Donau Klagenfurt	19	(2)
2025–	Dob	0	(0)

International career
2007	Slovenia U18	6	(0)
2007	Slovenia U19	5	(0)
2009–2010	Slovenia U21	4	(0)
- * Club domestic league appearances and goals as of 18 July 2025

Darko Zec (born 21 February 1989) is a Slovenian footballer who plays as a defender for Dob.

== Honours ==
Domžale

- Slovenian PrvaLiga: 2007–08
- Slovenian Cup: 2010–11
- Slovenian Supercup: 2007, 2011
