= Peter Stojanović =

Slovenian footballer

Personal information
- Date of birth: 8 March 1990 (age 36)
- Place of birth: Ljubljana, SFR Yugoslavia
- Height: 1.88 m (6 ft 2 in)
- Position: Midfielder

Team information
- Current team: WSG Radenthein

Youth career
- –2008: Slovan
- 2009: Celje

Senior career*
Years	Team	Apps	(Gls)
2008–2009	Celje	9	(0)
2009	→ Zagorje (loan)	8	(0)
2010–2011	Olimpija Ljubljana	29	(0)
2010	→ Šentjur (loan)	9	(0)
2011	Koper	4	(0)
2012	Šport Podbrezová		
2012	Bežanija	9	(0)
2013	Krka	6	(0)
2013–2014	Šamorín	19	(1)
2014	Brinje	10	(5)
2015–2016	Nußdorf/Debant	39	(23)
2016–2019	Union Lind	86	(32)
2019–2020	SV Sachsenburg	13	(1)
2020–2023	Union Lind	81	(30)
2024–	WSG Radenthein	0	(0)

International career
2009	Slovenia U19	4	(0)
- * Club domestic league appearances and goals as of 15 January 2024

Peter Stojanović (born 8 March 1990) is a Slovenian footballer who plays as a midfielder for Austrian club WSG Radenthein.

== Club career ==
Born in Ljubljana, back then still within Yugoslavia, Stojanović played with ND Slovan as a youth player. In 2008, he signed with Celje. After spending the first season on loan with Zagorje in the Slovenian Second League, he returned to Celje and made his debut in the Slovenian PrvaLiga in 2009. During the winter break of the 2009–10 season, he moved to Olimpija Ljubljana.

In summer 2011, he moved to another Slovenian top division club, Koper, but at the end of the first half of the season he moved abroad and joined Slovak Second League club ŽP Šport Podbrezová. In summer 2012 he signed with Serbian First League club FK Bežanija.

He then played with FC ŠTK 1914 Šamorín in the Slovak Second League. Next he had spells with Austrian lower league clubs Nußdorf/Debant and Union Lind, before returning to Slovenia where he signed with futsal team FC Ivančna Gorica.

== International career ==
In 2009, he made four appearances for Slovenia U19, making his debut on 24 March 2009 against Hungary.
