= Mato Šimunović =

Austrian footballer

Personal information
- Full name: Mato Šimunović
- Date of birth: 27 September 1985 (age 41)
- Place of birth: Banja Luka, SFR Yugoslavia
- Height: 1.80 m (5 ft 11 in)
- Position: Midfielder

Team information
- Current team: FC Wels
- Number: 8

Youth career
- 2003–2004: Blau-Weiß Linz
- 2004–2006: Pasching II

Senior career*
Years	Team	Apps	(Gls)
2006–2008	Schwadorf	47	(6)
2008	Winterthur	12	(3)
2009	Nitra	11	(1)
2010–2011	Domžale	31	(2)
2011–2012	Anagennisi Dherynia	19	(1)
2012	Ordabasy	2	(0)
2012–2013	Domžale	24	(1)
- * Club domestic league appearances and goals as of 12:10, 31 March 2017 (UTC)

Mato Šimunović (born 27 September 1985 in Banja Luka) is an Austrian footballer.
