= Anže Košnik =

Slovenian footballer

Personal information
- Full name: Anže Košnik
- Date of birth: 10 July 1991 (age 35)
- Place of birth: Kranj, SFR Yugoslavia
- Height: 1.95 m (6 ft 5 in)
- Position: Forward

Team information
- Current team: SC Grafenschachen
- Number: 15

Youth career
- Britof

Senior career*
Years	Team	Apps	(Gls)
–2011	Šenčur	59	(7)
2011	Triglav Kranj	17	(0)
2012	Šenčur	25	(12)
2013–2014	Krka	39	(2)
2014–2021	SC Pinkafeld	172	(90)
2022	Ilzer SV	12	(2)
2023	Piggau-Friedberg	7	(1)
2023-	SC Grafenschachen	14	(5)
- * Club domestic league appearances and goals as of 8 December 2023

Anže Košnik (born 10 July 1991) is a Slovenian footballer who plays for SC Grafenschachen.
