= Alen Krcić =

Slovenian footballer

Personal information
- Full name: Alen Krcić
- Date of birth: 19 November 1988 (age 37)
- Place of birth: Kranj, SFR Yugoslavia
- Height: 1.79 m (5 ft 10 in)
- Position: Midfielder

Youth career
- –2007: Triglav Kranj

Senior career*
Years	Team	Apps	(Gls)
2007–2009	Šenčur	40	(14)
2009–2012	Triglav Kranj	73	(7)
2012–2013	Crotone	0	(0)
2013–2018	Triglav Kranj	92	(5)
2018–2020	Bravo	24	(0)
2020–2022	SV Dellach/Gail	29	(13)
- * Club domestic league appearances and goals as of 10 December 2023

Alen Krcić (born 19 November 1988) is a Slovenian retired football midfielder.
