= Luka Pavlin =

Slovenian footballer

Personal information
- Date of birth: 16 October 1988 (age 38)
- Place of birth: Kranj, SFR Yugoslavia
- Height: 1.79 m (5 ft 10 in)
- Position: Midfielder

Youth career
- –2007: Britof

Senior career*
Years	Team	Apps	(Gls)
2007–2010	Olimpija Ljubljana	18	(3)
2008	→ Slovan (loan)	3	(0)
2009	→ Jadran Dekani (loan)	8	(2)
2010–2011	Koper	10	(1)
2011–2012	Šenčur	15	(2)
2012	Olympiakos Nicosia	0	(0)
2013–2015	Šenčur	50	(4)
2016	Zarica Kranj	9	(0)
- * Club domestic league appearances and goals

Luka Pavlin (born 16 October 1988) is a Slovenian retired footballer who played as a midfielder.
