= Etien Velikonja =

Slovenian footballer (born 1988)

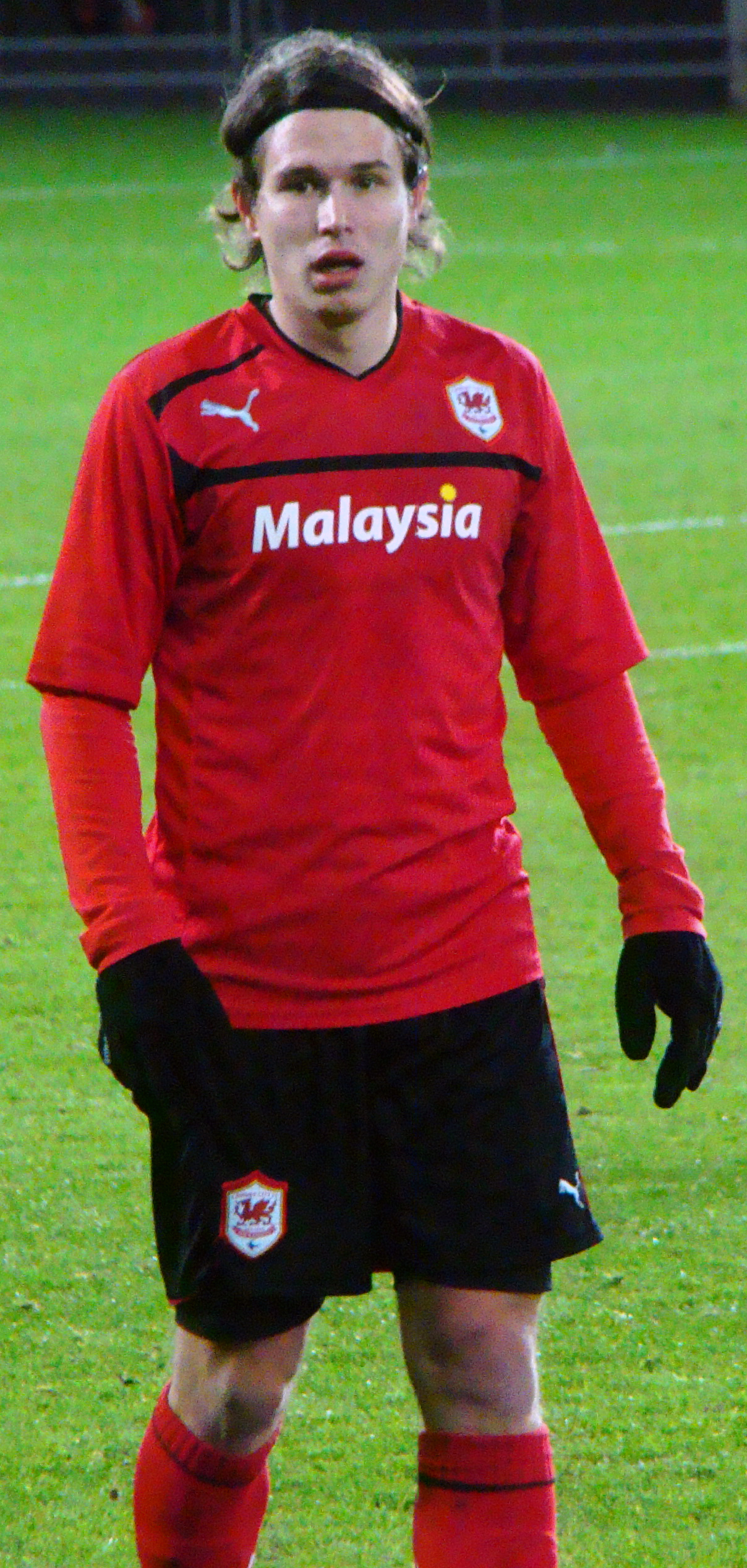
- Velikonja with Cardiff City in 2013

Personal information
- Date of birth: 26 December 1988 (age 37)
- Place of birth: Šempeter pri Gorici, SR Slovenia, Yugoslavia
- Height: 1.78 m (5 ft 10 in)
- Positions: Forward; winger

Team information
- Current team: Kras Repen

Youth career
- –2007: Gorica

Senior career*
Years	Team	Apps	(Gls)
2006–2010	Gorica	104	(32)
2011–2012	Maribor	48	(20)
2012–2016	Cardiff City	3	(0)
2014–2015	→ Rio Ave (loan)	7	(1)
2015–2016	→ Lierse (loan)	40	(28)
2016–2017	Olimpija Ljubljana	21	(4)
2017	Gençlerbirliği	6	(0)
2017–2018	Willem II	5	(3)
2019	Gorica	22	(15)
2019–2021	NEC	16	(2)
2020–2021	→ Gorica (loan)	32	(3)
2021–2023	Gorica	51	(18)
2023–	Kras Repen		

International career
2006	Slovenia U18	3	(0)
2006	Slovenia U19	4	(0)
2007–2009	Slovenia U20	7	(6)
2007–2010	Slovenia U21	14	(3)
2009–2012	Slovenia	3	(0)
- * Club domestic league appearances and goals

Etien Velikonja (born 26 December 1988) is a Slovenian footballer who plays as a forward for Kras Repen.

== Club career ==
=== Gorica ===
Velikonja started to play football at Gorica. Coming through their youth system, he was promoted to the senior squad in 2006–07. In his first season, he took part in seven matches, scoring one goal. Next year, during the 2007–08 season, Velikonja played 31 matches, scoring five goals. During the 2008–09 campaign, Velikonja played 32 matches and scored a total of 17 goals, finishing the campaign as the top goal scorer in the Slovenian PrvaLiga. In October 2009, in a league match against Koper, he sustained a serious knee injury which caused him to miss the majority of the 2009–10 season. He was not available to the team up until the end of April 2010, four rounds before the end of the season, when he returned to the pitch as a late substitute in a league match against Drava Ptuj.

=== Maribor ===
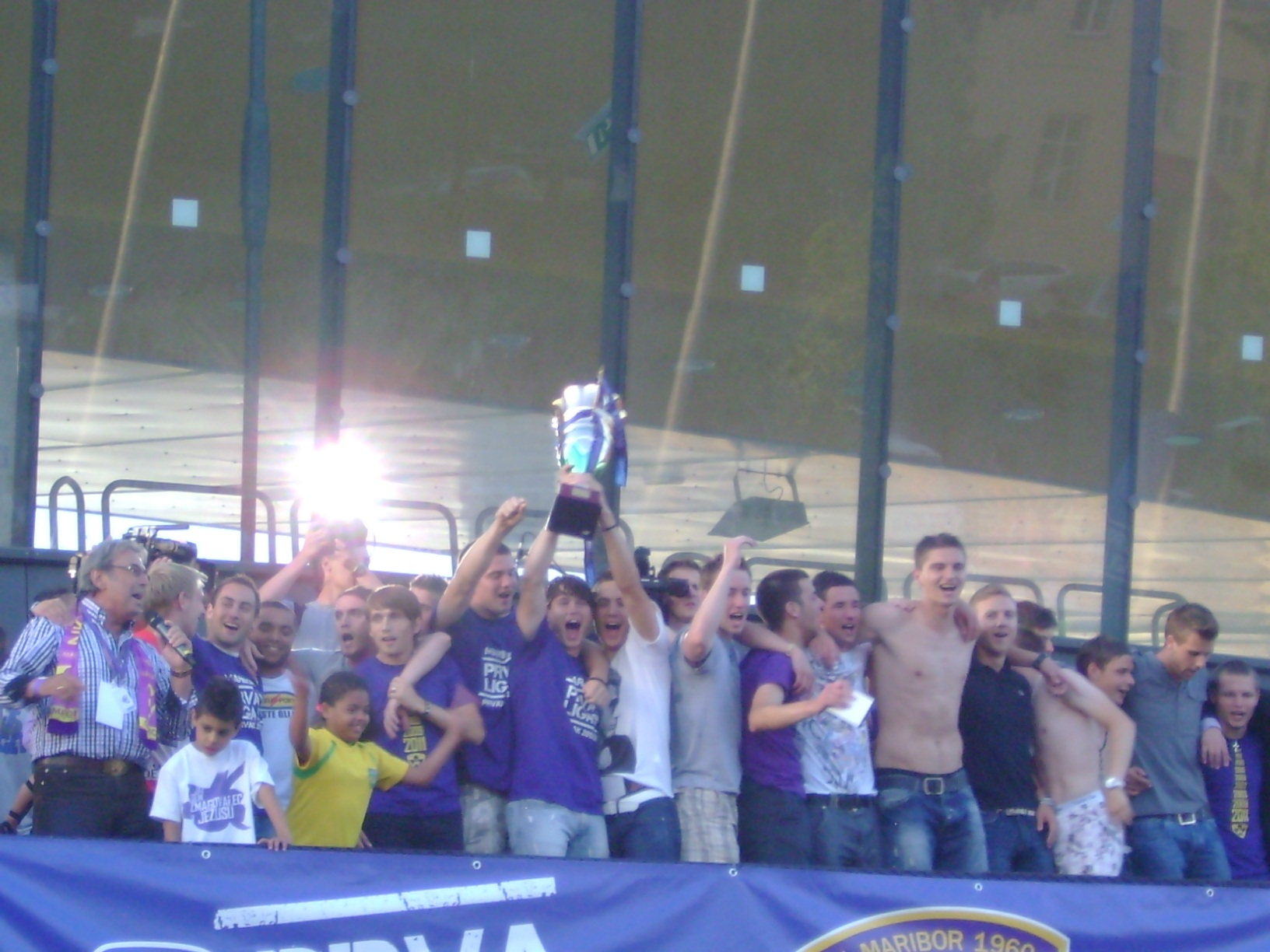
Velikonja with the Slovenian PrvaLiga trophy in 2011

During the 2010 summer transfer window, it was speculated for the first time that Velikonja could join Slovenian PrvaLiga side Maribor, however, the deal was eventually not carried out and Velikonja stayed with Gorica for the start of the 2010–11 season. By the end of 2010, he had played a total of 18 league matches for Gorica with an average of over 89 minutes per round, scoring five goals in the process. On 17 January 2011, during the winter transfer window, Velikonja was signed by Maribor in a deal that included an undisclosed transfer fee and player Vito Plut, who left Maribor for Gorica. He signed a contract with Maribor until 31 December 2013, and made his league debut on 26 February 2011 in a 4–2 win over Rudar Velenje, where he also scored his first goal for Maribor.

=== Cardiff City ===
On 12 July 2012, Velikonja signed a four-year contract for Football League Championship side Cardiff City. The whole transfer is reportedly worth €3.6 million and Zlatko Zahovič, director of football at Maribor, stated that the Velikonja transfer was a record high for the Slovenian PrvaLiga at the time. Maribor reportedly received a compensation of €2 million, with Velikonja earning around €400,000 per season for a total of €1.6 million in four years with the Welsh side. He joined his new club on 25 July after the second qualifying round of the 2012–13 UEFA Champions League. He made his debut on 21 August in a 0–0 draw against Brighton & Hove Albion. Despite a prolific goalscoring record for Cardiff's Development Squad, Velikonja found first-team opportunities limited during his first season at the club, but was rewarded for his patience with a start up front at Hull City on the final day of the title-winning campaign, which resulted in being substituted at half time after an ineffective performance.

==== Rio Ave (loan) ====
After months of waiting for his Premier League debut, Cardiff City loaned him to Rio Ave in January 2014 until the end of the season. He played two cup finals with Nuno Espírito Santo's team but lost both the Taça de Portugal and Taça da Liga finals against Benfica.

==== Lierse (loan) ====
With Cardiff City swiftly relegated to the Championship, Velikonja was loaned out again in January 2015. Former Slovenia national team manager Slaviša Stojanović brought Velikonja to Lierse. After the team was relegated from the top division in 2014–15, Velikonja scored eight goals in his first eight appearances of the season during the 2015–16 Belgian Second Division. With mid-table Lierse struggling in the fight for promotion, Velikonja broke his all-time goalscoring record for a single season by scoring his 21st goal against Heist on 19 March 2016. Velikonja finished the season with a record goal tally of 24 and as the league's top scorer for the second time in his career. Lierse finished seventh and avoided the drop to Belgian amateur league football. He was voted as the player of the season by Lierse fans.

=== Olimpija Ljubljana ===
Velikonja returned to Slovenia for the 2016–17 season, accepting an offer from Olimpija Ljubljana. He scored on his debut for Olimpija against AS Trenčín in the second round of the UEFA Champions League qualifying campaign.

He then joined Eredivisie outfit Willem II in 2017, but a severe knee injury cut short his stay at the club.

== International career ==
Velikonja was a member of the Slovenia youth national teams from under-18 to under-21. On 12 August 2009, he made his debut for the senior team in a 2010 FIFA World Cup qualification match against San Marino.

== Personal life ==
Velikonja was born in Šempeter pri Gorici, present day Slovenia. He is the cousin of fellow footballer Tim Matavž. He is in a long-term relationship with Slovenian triple jumper Maja Bratkič.

== Career statistics ==
=== Club ===
As of 21 April 2020

Appearances and goals by club, season and competition
Club	Season	League			National cup		League cup		Continental		Total	
Club	Season	Division	Apps	Goals	Apps	Goals	Apps	Goals	Apps	Goals	Apps	Goals
Gorica	2006–07	1. SNL	7	1	1	0	—		2 (Note: Appearance(s) in UEFA Champions League)	0	10	1
Gorica	2007–08	1. SNL	31	5	1	0	—		2 (Note: Appearance(s) in UEFA Cup)	0	34	5
Gorica	2008–09	1. SNL	32	17	4	4	—		3 (Note: Appearance(s) in UEFA Intertoto Cup)	1	39	22
Gorica	2009–10	1. SNL	16	5	0	0	—		2 (Note: Appearance(s) in UEFA Europa League)	0	18	5
Gorica	2010–11	1. SNL	18	4	3	3	—		2	0	23	7
Gorica	Total		104	32	9	7	0	0	11	1	124	40
Maribor	2010–11	1. SNL	16	6	3	1	—		—		19	7
Maribor	2011–12	1. SNL	30	14	5	6	—		7 (Note: Three appearances in UEFA Champions League, four appearances and one goal in UEFA Europa League)	1	42	21
Maribor	2012–13	1. SNL	2	0	0	0	—		1	0	3	0
Maribor	Total		48	20	8	7	0	0	8	1	64	28
Cardiff City	2012–13	Championship	3	0	1	0	0	0	—		4	0
Cardiff City	2013–14	Premier League	0	0	0	0	0	0	—		0	0
Cardiff City	2014–15	Championship	0	0	0	0	1	0	—		1	0
Cardiff City	Total		3	0	1	0	1	0	0	0	5	0
Rio Ave (loan)	2013–14	Primeira Liga	7	1	0	0	0	0	—		7	1
Lierse (loan)	2014–15	Belgian Pro League	11	4	0	0	—		—		11	4
Lierse (loan)	2015–16	Belgian Second Division	29	24	0	0	—		—		29	24
Lierse (loan)	Total		40	28	0	0	0	0	0	0	40	28
Olimpija Ljubljana	2016–17	1. SNL	21	4	3	2	—		2	1	26	7
Gençlerbirliği	2016–17	Süper Lig	6	0	1	1	—		0	0	7	1
Willem II	2017–18	Eredivisie	5	3	1	0	—		0	0	6	3
Gorica	2018–19	1. SNL	16	8	0	0	—		—		16	8
Gorica	2019–20	2. SNL	6	7	0	0	—		—		6	7
Gorica	Total		22	15	0	0	0	0	0	0	22	15
NEC	2019–20	Eerste Divisie	15	2	1	0	—		—		16	2
Career total			271	105	24	17	1	0	21	3	317	125

== Honours ==
Maribor

- Slovenian PrvaLiga: 2010–11, 2011–12
- Slovenian Football Cup: 2011–12
- Slovenian Supercup: 2012

Gorica

- Slovenian Second League: 2021–22

Individual

- Slovenian PrvaLiga top scorer: 2008–09
- Belgian Second Division top scorer: 2015–16
