= Matej Centrih =

Slovenian footballer

Personal information
- Full name: Matej Centrih
- Date of birth: 5 September 1988 (age 38)
- Place of birth: SFR Yugoslavia
- Height: 1.87 m (6 ft 2 in)
- Positions: Right-back; centre-back

Youth career
- –2009: Celje

Senior career*
Years	Team	Apps	(Gls)
2009–2014	Celje	44	(1)
2007–2008	→ Zagorje (loan)	11	(0)
2008-2010	→ Šentjur (loan)	43	(0)
2010–2012	→ Interblock (loan)	39	(3)
2014–2015	Radomlje	13	(0)
2015	SG Drautal	4	(0)
2015	VfB Germania Halberstadt	8	(1)
2016	Egersund	6	(0)
2017	DSV Leoben	3	(0)
- * Club domestic league appearances and goals as of 25 May 2014

Matej Centrih (born 5 September 1988) is a football player from Slovenia who played for Radomlje in the Slovenian PrvaLiga.

== Career ==
Centrih has also played in Norway for Egersunds IK and in Austria for both SG Drautal and DSV Leoben.
