= Davor Škerjanc =

Slovenian footballer

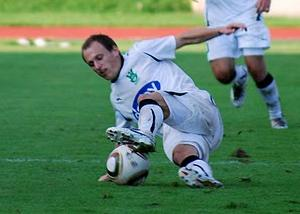

Personal information
- Date of birth: 7 January 1986 (age 40)
- Place of birth: Postojna, SFR Yugoslavia
- Height: 1.68 m (5 ft 6 in)
- Position: Midfielder

Youth career
- Jadran Hrpelje-Kozina
- –2002: Factor
- 2002–2005: Bilje / Primorje

Senior career*
Years	Team	Apps	(Gls)
2003–2004	Tabor Sežana	7	(0)
2004–2009	Primorje	132	(9)
2005	→ Bilje (loan)	11	(1)
2009–2012	Olimpija Ljubljana	96	(18)
2013	Krka	12	(6)
2014	Ethnikos Gazoros	23	(4)
2014–2015	Voždovac	24	(3)
2015	Koper	5	(0)
2016	Triestina	12	(2)
2016–2019	Tabor Sežana	55	(11)

International career
2005–2006	Slovenia U20	3	(0)
2007	Slovenia U21	5	(0)
- * Club domestic league appearances and goals

Davor Škerjanc (born 7 January 1986) is a Slovenian retired footballer who played as a midfielder.

== Career ==
Škerjanc made his Slovenian PrvaLiga debut with Primorje in 2004. On 14 August 2009, he signed with Olimpija Ljubljana and stayed with the team for the next three-and-a-half seasons. He played half the season with Krka, before moving to Greece in summer 2013 to play with Ethnikos Gazoros. On 31 August 2014, the last day of the Serbian SuperLiga transfer window, he signed a one-year contract with Voždovac.
