= Jernej Smukavec =

Slovenian footballer

Personal information
- Date of birth: 6 August 1991 (age 35)
- Place of birth: Ljubljana, Slovenia
- Height: 1.78 m (5 ft 10 in)
- Position: Striker

Youth career
- 2001–2005: Olimpija
- 2005–2007: Slovan
- 2007–2009: Interblock

Senior career*
Years	Team	Apps	(Gls)
2009–2010	Interblock	9	(0)
2010	Dob	1	(0)
2010–2011	Domžale	34	(5)
2012	Rudar Trbovlje	5	(0)
2013–2014	Radomlje	19	(5)
2014	DSG Klopeinersee	14	(15)
2015	SV Gallizien	11	(5)
2015–2017	SV Ludmannsdorf	44	(17)
2017	SC Ulrichsberg	5	(2)
- * Club domestic league appearances and goals as of 30 March 2014

Jernej Smukavec (born 6 August 1991) is a Slovenian footballer.

He was playing for Domžale in the Slovenian PrvaLiga.
