= Jovan Vidović =

Slovenian footballer (born 1989)

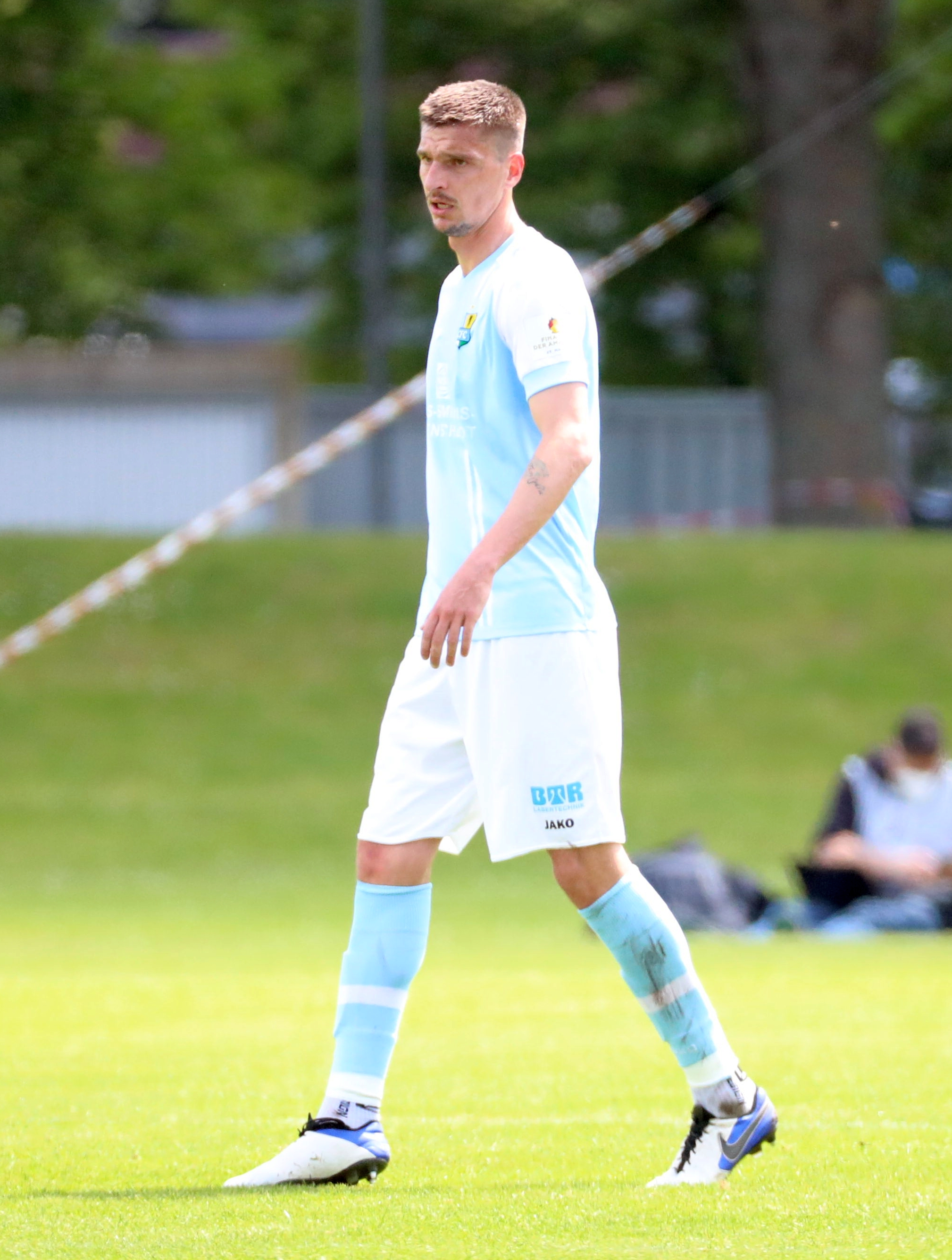
- Vidović with Chemnitzer FC in 2021

Personal information
- Date of birth: 6 January 1989 (age 37)
- Place of birth: Ljubljana, SFR Yugoslavia
- Height: 1.97 m (6 ft 6 in)
- Position: Centre-back

Youth career
- 1998–2002: Šmartno
- 2002–2004: Slovan
- 2004–2008: Domžale

Senior career*
Years	Team	Apps	(Gls)
2008–2010	Domžale	54	(2)
2008–2009	→ Radomlje (loan)	5	(1)
2010–2013	Maribor	28	(2)
2013	Ravan Baku	0	(0)
2013–2014	Wehen Wiesbaden	19	(1)
2014–2015	Hansa Rostock	9	(0)
2016–2019	SV Meppen	104	(7)
2019–2020	Weiche Flensburg	18	(1)
2020–2022	Chemnitzer FC	18	(2)
2023–2025	Slovan	40	(2)

International career
2007	Slovenia U18	2	(0)
2007	Slovenia U19	3	(0)
2008–2010	Slovenia U20	5	(0)
2009–2010	Slovenia U21	10	(0)
- * Club domestic league appearances and goals

Jovan Vidović (born 6 January 1989) is a Slovenian retired footballer who played as a defender.

== Club career ==
Vidović started his football career at local club Šmartno, and later transferred to another Ljubljana-based club Slovan at the age of 13.

In late November 2010 it was announced by Zlatko Zahovič, Maribor's director of football, that Maribor had acquired Vidović on a permanent move as a result of Siniša Anđelković transfer from Maribor to Palermo during the 2010–11 winter transfer window. The transfer has been made official on 7 December 2010 as Vidović signed a four-year contract with the club.

In July 2013, Vidović joined Azerbaijan Premier League side Ravan Baku on a one-year contract with the option of another year.
