= Vito Plut =

Slovenian footballer

Personal information
- Date of birth: 8 July 1988 (age 38)
- Place of birth: Semič, SR Slovenia, Yugoslavia
- Height: 1.85 m (6 ft 1 in)
- Position: Forward

Team information
- Current team: Swieqi United
- Number: 9

Youth career
- 2000–2006: Kolpa

Senior career*
Years	Team	Apps	(Gls)
2004–2006	Kolpa	24	(3)
2007–2008	Koper	44	(9)
2008–2010	Maribor	64	(14)
2011–2012	Gorica	54	(24)
2012–2013	Waasland-Beveren	20	(0)
2013–2014	1. FC Saarbrücken	17	(0)
2014–2015	Floriana	32	(12)
2015–2017	Birkirkara	52	(23)
2017–2020	FSV Frankfurt	69	(20)
2020–2021	Tarxien Rainbows	22	(9)
2021–2022	Santa Lucia	26	(8)
2022–2023	Gudja United	25	(6)
2023–2026	Sliema Wanderers	81	(22)
2026–	Swieqi United	2	(1)

International career
2008–2009	Slovenia U20	6	(2)
2008–2010	Slovenia U21	16	(1)
- * Club domestic league appearances and goals as of 18 September 2028

Vito Plut (born 8 July 1988) is a Slovenian footballer who plays as a forward for Maltese Challenge League club Swieqi United.

== Honours ==
Maribor

- Slovenian PrvaLiga: 2008–09
- Slovenian Cup: 2009–10
- Slovenian Supercup: 2009

Sliema Wanderers

- Maltese FA Trophy: 2023–24
