= 2006 UEFA Intertoto Cup =

Tournament details
- Dates: 17 June 2006 – 22 July 2006
- Teams: 49

Final positions
- Champions: (England) Newcastle United and 10 others (see below)

Tournament statistics
- Matches played: 76
- Goals scored: 224 (2.95 per match)

The regions in a map

The 2006 UEFA Intertoto Cup was the first edition after a major change of the competition format. There were only three rounds instead of five, and eleven tournament co-winners qualified for the second qualifying round of the UEFA Cup (instead of three teams qualifying for the first round proper). Also, for the first time in the modern history of the competition, an outright winner was highlighted from the 11 co-winners of the Cup, with that honour going to the final-round Intertoto winner that advanced farthest in the UEFA Cup. This honour went to Newcastle United.

== First round ==
Team 1	Agg.	Team 2	1st leg	2nd leg
Southern-Mediterranean region
Pobeda (North Macedonia)	2–4	(Romania) Farul Constanţa	2–2	0–2
UE Sant Julià (Andorra)	0–8	(Slovenia) Maribor	0–3	0–5
Ethnikos Achna (Cyprus)	5–4	(Albania) Partizani	4–2	1–2
Zrinjski (Bosnia and Herzegovina)	4–1	(Malta) Marsaxlokk	3–0	1–1
Central-East region
Kilikia (Armenia)	1–8	(Georgia (country)) Dinamo Tbilisi	1–5	0–3
Shakhter Karagandy (Kazakhstan)	4–6	(Belarus) MTZ-RIPO Minsk	1–5	3–1
Nitra (Slovakia)	12–2	(Luxembourg) Grevenmacher	6–2	6–0
MKT Araz Imisli (Azerbaijan)	1–2	(Moldova) Tiraspol	1–0	0–2
Northern region
Keflavík (Iceland)	4–1	(Northern Ireland) Dungannon Swifts	4–1	0–0
Dinaburg (Latvia)	2–1	(Faroe Islands) Havnar Bóltfelag	1–1	1–0
Tampere United (Finland)	8–1	(Wales) Carmarthen Town	5–0	3–1
Narva Trans (Estonia)	1–8	(Sweden) Kalmar FF	1–6	0–2
Vėtra (Lithuania)	0–5	(Republic of Ireland) Shelbourne	0–1	0–4

=== First leg ===
18 June 2006

Pobeda (North Macedonia)	2–2	(Romania) Farul Constanţa
Stojković 51'; Tančevski 72'		Farmache 30'; L. Mihai 59'

Stadion Goce Delčev, Prilep
Attendance: 2,500
Referee: Vlado Svilokos (Croatia)

18 June 2006

UE Sant Julià (Andorra)	0–3	(Slovenia) Maribor
		Zajc 56'; Zeba 85', 90'

Estadi Comunal d'Andorra la Vella, Andorra la Vella
Attendance: 800
Referee: Lasha Silagava (Georgia)

17 June 2006

Ethnikos Achna (Cyprus)	4–2	(Albania) Partizani
Kmetec 21', 48', 59'; Stjepanović 30'		Elis Bakaj 66'; Sheta 78'

Dasaki Stadium, Achna
Attendance: 300
Referee: Aleksandr Gonchar (Russia)

17 June 2006

Zrinjski (Bosnia and Herzegovina)	3–0	(Malta) Marsaxlokk
Žižović 18' (pen.); Đurić 26'; Kordić 44'

Stadion pod Bijelim Brijegom, Mostar
Attendance: 2,000
Referee: Sebastian Colțescu (Romania)

18 June 2006

Kilikia (Armenia)	1–5	(Georgia (country)) Dinamo Tbilisi
N. Erzrumyan 42'		Rodrigo 36'; Dvali 37', 57'; Khutsishvili 72'; Bobokhidze 90'

Hrazdan Stadium, Yerevan
Attendance: 600
Referee: Marcin Borski (Poland)

17 June 2006

Shakhter Karagandy (Kazakhstan)	1–5	(Belarus) MTZ-RIPO Minsk
Nilton 67'		Shchagrykovich 45+'; Hleb 52'; Mamić 62', 82'; Strakhanovich 64'

Shakhter Stadium, Karaganda
Attendance: 10,500
Referee: Johny Ver Eecke (Belgium)

18 June 2006

Nitra (Slovakia)	6–2	(Luxembourg) Grevenmacher
Bališ 14'; Rák 18', 78', 84'; Hesek 40'; Babic 90+'		Božić 55', 87'

Štadión pod Zoborom, Nitra
Attendance: 1,084
Referee: Vusal Aliyev (Azerbaijan)

17 June 2006

MKT Araz Imisli (Azerbaijan)	1–0	(Moldova) Tiraspol
Reshitsa 65'

Heydar Aliyev Stadium, Imishli
Attendance: 2,500
Referee: Cüneyt Çakır (Turkey)

17 June 2006

Keflavík (Iceland)	4–1	(Northern Ireland) Dungannon Swifts
Samuelsen 16'; Steinarsson 67', 73' (pen.); Þorsteinsson 80'		Montgomery 87'

Keflavíkurvöllur, Keflavík
Attendance: 400
Referee: Peter Rasmussen (Denmark)

18 June 2006

Dinaburg (Latvia)	1–1	(Faroe Islands) Havnar Bóltfelag
Logins 13'		Nolsøe 59'

Celtnieks Stadium, Daugavpils
Attendance: 500
Referee: Aleksei Kulbakov (Belarus)

17 June 2006

Tampere United (Finland)	5–0	(Wales) Carmarthen Town
Hynynen 24'; Lehtinen 40'; J-P. Savolainen 43'; Heinänen 65'; Pertot 90+'

Tampere Stadium, Tampere
Attendance: 2,046
Referee: Nebojša Rabrenović (Serbia)

17 June 2006

Narva Trans (Estonia)	1–6	(Sweden) Kalmar FF
Kulatšenko 2'		Johansson 44'; Santin 62'; Ari 67', 86'; V. Elm 70'; Petersson 90+'

A. Le Coq Arena, Tallinn
Attendance: 150
Referee: Nicole Petignat (Switzerland)

18 June 2006

Vėtra (Lithuania)	0–1	(Republic of Ireland) Shelbourne
		Dillon 43'

Vetros Stadium, Vilnius
Attendance: 1,301
Referee: Svein Oddvar Moen (Norway)

=== Second leg ===
25 June 2006

Farul Constanţa (Romania)	2–0	(North Macedonia) Pobeda
Moldovan 22'; Guriță 65'

Stadionul Farul, Constanța
Attendance: 980
Referee: Libor Kovařík (Czech Republic)

Farul Constanţa won 4–2 on aggregate.

24 June 2006

Maribor (Slovenia)	5–0	(Andorra) UE Sant Julià
Rakič 25'; Zajc 27'; Vuksanović 48'; Mihelič 64', 70'

Ljudski vrt, Maribor
Attendance: 1,200
Referee: Igor Kister (Kazakhstan)

Maribor won 8–0 on aggregate.

24 June 2006

Partizani (Albania)	2–1	(Cyprus) Ethnikos Achna
Bylykbashi 29'; Abilaliaj 90'		Stjepanović 3'

Selman Stërmasi Stadium, Tirana
Attendance: 350
Referee: Marijo Strahonja (Croatia)

Ethnikos Achna won 5–4 on aggregate.

25 June 2006

Marsaxlokk (Malta)	1–1	(Bosnia and Herzegovina) Zrinjski
Schembri 34'		Smajić 81'

Hibernians Stadium, Paola
Attendance: 250
Referee: Genadij Sidenko (Moldova)

Zrinjski won 4–1 on aggregate.

24 June 2006

Dinamo Tbilisi (Georgia (country))	3–0	(Armenia) Kilikia
Grigalashvili 27'; Gigauri 40'; Iashvili 87'

Mikheil Meskhi Stadium, Tbilisi
Attendance: 130
Referee: Stanislav Todorov (Bulgaria)

Dinamo Tbilisi won 8–1 on aggregate.

25 June 2006

MTZ-RIPO Minsk (Belarus)	1–3	(Kazakhstan) Shakhter Karagandy
Strakhanovich 59' (pen.)		Rusnac 14'; Urazbakhtin 37'; Glushko 54'

Traktor Stadium, Minsk
Attendance: 3,200
Referee: Leontios Trattou (Cyprus)

MTZ-RIPO Minsk won 6–4 on aggregate.

25 June 2006

Grevenmacher (Luxembourg)	0–6	(Slovakia) Nitra
		Rák 5'; Babic 12'; Bališ 51'; Čižmár 57'; Hesek 60'; Grajciar 63'

Op Flohr Stadion, Grevenmacher
Attendance: 211
Referee: Goran Spirkoski (Macedonia)

Nitra won 12–2 on aggregate.

24 June 2006

Tiraspol (Moldova)	2–0	(Azerbaijan) MKT Araz Imisli
Alexeev 16', 38'	Report

Sheriff Stadium, Tiraspol
Attendance: 1,700
Referee: Draženko Kovačić (Croatia)

Tiraspol won 2–1 on aggregate.

24 June 2006

Dungannon Swifts (Northern Ireland)	0–0	(Iceland) Keflavík

Windsor Park, Belfast
Attendance: 200
Referee: Jorge de Sousa (Portugal)

Keflavík won 4–1 on aggregate.

24 June 2006

Havnar Bóltfelag (Faroe Islands)	0–1	(Latvia) Dinaburg
		Mortensen 55' (o.g.)

Tórsvøllur, Tórshavn
Attendance: 400
Referee: Adrian McCourt (Northern Ireland)

Dinaburg won 2–1 on aggregate.

24 June 2006

Carmarthen Town (Wales)	1–3	(Finland) Tampere United
Thomas 36'		Lehtinen 8', 38', 48'

Latham Park, Newtown
Attendance: 325
Referee: Hannes Kaasik (Estonia)

Tampere United won 8–1 on aggregate.

25 June 2006

Kalmar FF (Sweden)	2–0	(Estonia) Narva Trans
R. Elm 7'; Ari 27'

Fredriksskans, Kalmar
Attendance: 678
Referee: Willie Collum (Scotland)

Kalmar FF won 8–1 on aggregate.

24 June 2006

Shelbourne (Republic of Ireland)	4–0	(Lithuania) Vėtra
Ryan 36'; Byrne 66', 90+'; Crowe 69'

Tolka Park, Dublin
Attendance: 1,702
Referee: Markus Strömbergsson (Sweden)

Shelbourne won 5–0 on aggregate.

== Second round ==
Team 1	Agg.	Team 2	1st leg	2nd leg
Southern-Mediterranean region
Sopron (Hungary)	3–4	(Turkey) Kayserispor	3–3	0–1
Farul Constanţa (Romania)	3–2	(Bulgaria) Lokomotiv Plovdiv	2–1	1–1
Zeta^{*} (Montenegro)	1–4	(Slovenia) Maribor	1–2	0–2
Maccabi Petah Tikva (Israel)	4–2	(Bosnia and Herzegovina) Zrinjski	1–1	3–1
Osijek (Croatia)	2–2(a)	(Cyprus) Ethnikos Achna	2–2	0–0
Central-East region
Grasshoppers (Switzerland)	4–0	(Czech Republic) Teplice	2–0	2–0
Nitra (Slovakia)	2–3	(Ukraine) Dnipro Dnipropetrovsk	2–1	0–2
SV Ried (Austria)	4–1	(Georgia (country)) Dinamo Tbilisi	3–1	1–0
Tiraspol (Moldova)	4–1	(Poland) Lech Poznań	1–0	3–1
FC Moscow (Russia)	3–0	(Belarus) MTZ-RIPO Minsk	2–0	1–0
Northern region
Tampere United (Finland)	3–5	(Sweden) Kalmar FF	1–2	2–3
OB (Denmark)	3–1	(Republic of Ireland) Shelbourne	3–0	0–1
Lillestrøm (Norway)	6–3	(Iceland) Keflavík	4–1	2–2
Hibernian (Scotland)	8–0	(Latvia) Dinaburg	5–0	3–0

^{*} FK Zeta qualified for this season's UEFA competitions as member of the Football Association of Serbia and Montenegro during the 2005/06 season but was at the time of that match already a member of the Football Association of Montenegro.

=== First leg ===
1 July 2006

Sopron (Hungary)	3–3	(Turkey) Kayserispor
Feczesin 47'; Korudzhiev 66'; Ibric 71'		Gökhan 37' (pen.), 45'; Topuz 59'

Káposztás utcai Stadion, Sopron
Attendance: 2,200
Referee: Igor Zakharov (Russia)

1 July 2006

Farul Constanţa (Romania)	2–1	(Bulgaria) Lokomotiv Plovdiv
Moldovan 20'; Apostol 88'		Vandev 33'

Stadionul Farul, Constanța
Attendance: 300
Referee: Janos Megyebiro (Hungary)

2 July 2006

Zeta (Montenegro)	1–2	(Slovenia) Maribor
Stjepanović 83'		Zeba 75'; Igumanović 81' (o.g.)

Partizan Stadium, Belgrade^{1}
Attendance: 500
Referee: Radek Matějek (Czech Republic)

1 July 2006

Maccabi Petah Tikva (Israel)	1–1	(Bosnia and Herzegovina) Zrinjski
Ebiede 67'		Banay 54' (o.g.)

Herzliya Municipal Stadium, Herzliya^{2}
Attendance: 450
Referee: Luc Wilmes (Luxembourg)

2 July 2006

Osijek (Croatia)	2–2	(Cyprus) Ethnikos Achna
Pashialis 55' (o.g.); Vojnović 61'		Kmetec 2'; Poyiatzis 70'

Stadion Gradski vrt, Osijek
Attendance: 2,500
Referee: Ian Stokes (Republic of Ireland)

2 July 2006

Grasshoppers (Switzerland)	2–0	(Czech Republic) Teplice
Touré 48'; Biscotte 68'

Letzigrund, Zürich
Attendance: 1,000
Referee: Charlie Richmond (Scotland)

2 July 2006

Nitra (Slovakia)	2–1	(Ukraine) Dnipro Dnipropetrovsk
Rák 16'; Hrnčár 32'		Kornilenko 8'

Štadión pod Zoborom, Nitra
Attendance: 1,780
Referee: Paulius Malžinskas (Lithuania)

1 July 2006

SV Ried (Austria)	3–1	(Georgia (country)) Dinamo Tbilisi
Glasner 7'; Drechsel 47' (pen.); Seo 80'		Grigalashvili 37'

Fill Metallbau Stadion, Ried im Innkreis
Attendance: 3,500
Referee: Dejan Stanišić (Montenegro)

1 July 2006

Tiraspol (Moldova)	1–0	(Poland) Lech Poznań
Picușceac 18'

Sheriff Stadium, Tiraspol
Attendance: 1,500
Referee: David McKeon (Republic of Ireland)

1 July 2006

FC Moscow (Russia)	2–0	(Belarus) MTZ-RIPO Minsk
Bystrov 57'; Adamov 86'

Eduard Streltsov Stadium, Moscow
Attendance: 1,000
Referee: Michalis Germanakos (Greece)

2 July 2006

Tampere United (Finland)	1–2	(Sweden) Kalmar FF
Sipiläinen 75'		Hasani 7', 69'

Ratinan Stadion, Tampere
Attendance: 2,334
Referee: Jóhannes Valgeirsson (Iceland)

2 July 2006

OB (Denmark)	3–0	(Republic of Ireland) Shelbourne
Fevang 28', 42', 58'

Fionia Park, Odense
Attendance: 1,903
Referee: Tsvetan Georgiev (Bulgaria)

1 July 2006

Lillestrøm (Norway)	4–1	(Iceland) Keflavík
Riise 26'; Wehrman 35', 52'; Myklebust 90'		Arnarson 38'

Åråsen Stadion, Lillestrøm
Attendance: 609
Referee: Ihor Ischenko (Ukraine)

2 July 2006

Hibernian (Scotland)	5–0	(Latvia) Dinaburg
Killen 38'; Scott Brown 49'; Sproule 73'; Murphy 75'; Fletcher 85'

Easter Road, Edinburgh
Attendance: 11,731
Referee: Siniša Zrnić (Bosnia and Herzegovina)

^{1}The match was played at FK Partizan's ground in Belgrade, Serbia, because FK Zeta's ground in Golubovci doesn't meet UEFA standards
^{2}The match was played in Herzliya because Maccabi Petah Tikva's ground in Petah Tikva is undergoing renovations

=== Second leg ===
8 July 2006

Kayserispor (Turkey)	1–0	(Hungary) Sopron
Fatih 88'

Kayseri Atatürk Stadium, Kayseri
Attendance: 5,882
Referee: Pavel Olšiak (Slovakia)

Kayserispor won 4–3 on aggregate.

8 July 2006

Lokomotiv Plovdiv (Bulgaria)	1–1	(Romania) Farul Constanţa
Halimi 35'		Gheară 55'

Vasil Levski National Stadium, Sofia
Attendance: 1,675
Referee: Meir Levi (Israel)

Farul Constanţa won 3–2 on aggregate.

8 July 2006

Maribor (Slovenia)	2–0	(Montenegro) Zeta
Zajc 53'; Tomažič Šeruga 90+'

Ljudski vrt, Maribor
Attendance: 2,700
Referee: Michael Svendsen (Denmark)

Maribor won 4–1 on aggregate.

8 July 2006

Zrinjski (Bosnia and Herzegovina)	1–3	(Israel) Maccabi Petah Tikva
Diarra 17'		Sarsour 19'; Gabay 57'; Peser 73'

Stadion pod Bijelim Brijegom, Mostar
Attendance: 1,500
Referee: Veaceslav Banari (Moldova)

Maccabi Petah Tikva won 4–2 on aggregate.

8 July 2006

Ethnikos Achna (Cyprus)	0–0	(Croatia) Osijek

Dasaki Stadium, Achna
Attendance: 750
Referee: Adrian Casha (Malta)

2–2 on aggregate, Ethnikos Achna won on away goals rule.

9 July 2006

Teplice (Czech Republic)	0–2	(Switzerland) Grasshoppers
		Pavlović 52'; Eduardo 85'

Na Stínadlech, Teplice
Attendance: 3,500
Referee: Sergiy Berezka (Ukraine)

Grasshoppers won 4–0 on aggregate.

8 July 2006

Dnipro Dnipropetrovsk (Ukraine)	2–0	(Slovakia) Nitra
Kornilenko 31'; Bidnenko 57'

Meteor Stadium, Dnipropetrovsk
Attendance: 10,000
Referee: Per Ivar Staberg (Norway)

Dnipro Dnipropetrovsk won 3–2 on aggregate.

9 July 2006

Dinamo Tbilisi (Georgia (country))	0–1	(Austria) SV Ried
		Drechsel 66'

Mikheil Meskhi Stadium, Tbilisi
Attendance: 2,000
Referee: Mark Steven Whitby (Wales)

SV Ried won 4–1 on aggregate.

8 July 2006

Lech Poznań (Poland)	1–3	(Moldova) Tiraspol
Zakrzewski 74'		Picușceac 21'; Sydorenko 65'; Serghei Namașco 72'

Stadion Miejski, Poznań
Attendance: 8,000
Referee: Robert Krajnc (Slovenia)

Tiraspol won 4–1 on aggregate.

9 July 2006

MTZ-RIPO Minsk (Belarus)	0–1	(Russia) FC Moscow
		Adamov 81' (pen.)

Traktor Stadium, Minsk
Attendance: 1,400
Referee: Marek Mikolajewski (Poland)

FC Moscow won 3–0 on aggregate.

8 July 2006

Kalmar FF (Sweden)	3–2	(Finland) Tampere United
Carlsson 38'; Hasani 67'; Koroma 90+'		Lehtinen 31'; Wiss 86'

Fredriksskans, Kalmar
Attendance: 1,099
Referee: David Malcolm (Northern Ireland)

Kalmar FF won 5–3 on aggregate.

9 July 2006

Shelbourne (Republic of Ireland)	1–0	(Denmark) OB
N'Do 32'

Tolka Park, Dublin
Attendance: 800
Referee: Dietmar Drabek (Austria)

OB won 3–1 on aggregate.

9 July 2006

Keflavík (Iceland)	2–2	(Norway) Lillestrøm
Kristjánsson 58'; Rúnarsson 67'		Myklebust 10'; Koren 19'

Keflavíkurvöllur, Keflavík
Attendance: 300
Referee: Andrejs Sipailo (Latvia)

Lillestrøm won 6–3 on aggregate.

8 July 2006

Dinaburg (Latvia)	0–3	(Scotland) Hibernian
		Konte 18', 56'; Sproule 75'

Celtnieks Stadium, Daugavpils
Attendance: 350
Referee: Petteri Kari (Finland)

Hibernian won 8–0 on aggregate.

== Third round ==
The eleven winning teams qualified for the second qualifying round of the 2006–07 UEFA Cup.

Team 1	Agg.	Team 2	1st leg	2nd leg
Southern-Mediterranean region
Auxerre^{*} (France)	4–2	(Romania) Farul Constanţa	4–1	0–1
AEL (Greece)	0–2	(Turkey) Kayserispor	0–0	0–2
Villarreal (Spain)	2–3	(Slovenia) Maribor	1–2	1–1
Maccabi Petah Tikva (Israel)	3–4	(Cyprus) Ethnikos Achna	0–2	3–2
Central-East region
Grasshoppers (Switzerland)	3–2	(Belgium) Gent	2–1	1–1
Marseille (France)	(a)2–2	(Ukraine) Dnipro Dnipropetrovsk	0–0	2–2
Hertha BSC (Germany)	2–0	(Russia) FC Moscow	0–0^	2–0
SV Ried (Austria)	4–2	(Moldova) Tiraspol	3–1	1–1
Northern region
Newcastle United (England)	4–1	(Norway) Lillestrøm	1–1	3–0
Kalmar FF (Sweden)	2–3	(Netherlands) Twente	1–0	1–3
OB (Denmark)	(a)2–2	(Scotland) Hibernian	1–0	1–2

^played on 16 July

^{*}After consultations with UEFA, Italian qualifier Palermo was withdrawn by the Italian Football Federation (FIGC) on 6 June 2006. Due to the ongoing match-fixing scandal in Italy, the FIGC could not officially confirm the 2005–06 Serie A standings in time for Palermo to compete in the Intertoto Cup and therefore French club Auxerre replaced Palermo, according to UEFA regulations governing the Intertoto Cup.

=== First leg ===
15 July 2006

Auxerre (France)	4–1	(Romania) Farul Constanţa
Mathis 7'; Pieroni 9'; Kahlenberg 53'; Traoré 77'		Guriță 17'

Stade de l'Abbé-Deschamps, Auxerre
Attendance: 4,000
Referee: Thorsten Kinhöfer (Germany)

15 July 2006

AEL (Greece)	0–0	(Turkey) Kayserispor

Panthessaliko Stadium, Volos
Attendance: 7,000
Referee: Tiziano Pieri (Italy)

15 July 2006

Villarreal (Spain)	1–2	(Slovenia) Maribor
Forlán 71'		Rakič 40'; Mihelič 83'

Estadio El Madrigal, Villarreal
Attendance: 8,000
Referee: Kevin Blom (Netherlands)

15 July 2006

Maccabi Petah Tikva (Israel)	0–2	(Cyprus) Ethnikos Achna
		Schlichting 65'; Kebadze 77'

Herzliya Municipal Stadium, Herzliya
Attendance: 350
Referee: Claudio Circhetta (Switzerland)

15 July 2006

Grasshoppers (Switzerland)	2–1	(Belgium) Gent
Ristić 50'; Salatić 57'		Żewłakow 3'

Hardturm, Zürich
Attendance: 2,500
Referee: Sorin Corpodean (Romania)

15 July 2006

Marseille (France)	0–0	(Ukraine) Dnipro Dnipropetrovsk

Stade Parsemain, Fos-sur-Mer
Attendance: 6,884
Referee: Bernardino González Vázquez (Spain)

16 July 2006

Hertha BSC (Germany)	0–0	(Russia) FC Moscow

Friedrich-Ludwig-Jahn-Sportpark, Berlin
Attendance: 8,404
Referee: Mark Clattenburg (England)

15 July 2006

SV Ried (Austria)	3–1	(Moldova) Tiraspol
Drechsel 26'; Martínez 52'; Seo 80'		Alexeev 69'

Fill Metallbau Stadion, Ried im Innkreis
Attendance: 1,500
Referee: Cem Papila (Turkey)

15 July 2006

Newcastle United (England)	1–1	(Norway) Lillestrøm
Luque 50'		Koren 21'

St James' Park, Newcastle upon Tyne
Attendance: 31,059
Referee: Joeri van de Velde (Belgium)

15 July 2006

Kalmar FF (Sweden)	1–0	(Netherlands) Twente
Blomberg 51' (pen.)

Fredriksskans, Kalmar
Attendance: 2,684
Referee: Martin Atkinson (England)

15 July 2006

OB (Denmark)	1–0	(Scotland) Hibernian
Sørensen 32' (pen.)

Fionia Park, Odense
Attendance: 2,341
Referee: Philippe Kalt (France)

=== Second leg ===
22 July 2006

Farul Constanţa (Romania)	1–0	(France) Auxerre
Todoran 46' (pen.)

Stadionul Farul, Constanța
Attendance: 5,000
Referee: Bruno Paixão (Portugal)

AJ Auxerre won 4–2 on aggregate.

22 July 2006

Kayserispor (Turkey)	2–0	(Greece) AEL
Gökhan 31', 81'

Kayseri Atatürk Stadium, Kayseri
Attendance: 13,291
Referee: Thomas Einwaller (Austria)

Kayserispor won 2–0 on aggregate.

22 July 2006

Maribor (Slovenia)	1–1	(Spain) Villarreal
Zajc 89'		Nihat 85'

Ljudski vrt, Maribor
Attendance: 9,000
Referee: Carlo Bertolini (Switzerland)

Maribor won 3–2 on aggregate.

22 July 2006

Ethnikos Achna (Cyprus)	2–3	(Israel) Maccabi Petah Tikva
Belić 72'; Poyiatzis 80'		Sarsour 60'; Jefisley 43'; Suffo 86'

Dasaki Stadium, Achna
Attendance: 1,800
Referee: Duarte Gomes (Portugal)

Ethnikos Achna won 4–3 on aggregate.

22 July 2006

Gent (Belgium)	1–1	(Switzerland) Grasshoppers
Foley 67'		Eduardo 64'

Jules Ottenstadion, Ghent
Attendance: 4,500
Referee: Daniel Stålhammar (Sweden)

Grasshoppers won 3–2 on aggregate.

22 July 2006

Dnipro Dnipropetrovsk (Ukraine)	2–2	(France) Marseille
Nazarenko 78'; Rusol 87'		Niang 71'; Oruma 75'

Meteor Stadium, Dnipropetrovsk
Attendance: 19,000
Referee: Howard Webb (England)

2–2 on aggregate, Marseille won on away goals rule.

22 July 2006

FC Moscow (Russia)	0–2	(Germany) Hertha BSC
		Pantelić 25'; Yıldıray 85'

Eduard Streltsov Stadium, Moscow
Attendance: 3,500
Referee: Bülent Demirlek (Turkey)

Hertha BSC won 2–0 on aggregate.

23 July 2006

Tiraspol (Moldova)	1–1	(Austria) SV Ried
Rudac 83'		Damjanović 30'

Sheriff Stadium, Tiraspol
Attendance: 3,000
Referee: Christoforos Zografos (Greece)

SV Ried won 4–2 on aggregate.

22 July 2006

Lillestrøm (Norway)	0–3	(England) Newcastle United
		Ameobi 29', 36'; Emre 90'

Åråsen Stadion, Lillestrøm
Attendance: 8,742
Referee: Stanislav Sukhina (Russia)

Newcastle United won 4–1 on aggregate.

22 July 2006

Twente (Netherlands)	3–1	(Sweden) Kalmar FF
Touma 49', 73', 79'		Johansson 67'

Arke Stadion, Enschede
Attendance: 11,500
Referee: Alfonso Pérez Burrull (Spain)

Twente won 3–2 on aggregate.

22 July 2006

Hibernian (Scotland)	2–1	(Denmark) OB
Jones 53'; Dalglish 79'		Grahn 50'

Easter Road, Edinburgh
Attendance: 10,640
Referee: Matteo Trefoloni (Italy)

2–2 on aggregate, OB won on away goals rule.

== Overall winners ==
Eight of the eleven co-winners which entered the UEFA Cup via the Intertoto Cup won their qualifying ties and progressed to the first round proper. Half of these eight survived the first round and entered the group stages. Only Newcastle United secured a place in the UEFA Cup Round of 32 and were the last remaining team from the Intertoto Cup – making them the outright winner. They then went on to qualify for the last 16. Captain Scott Parker was presented with a certificate commemorating the triumph at St James Park before their tie with AZ.

- (England) Newcastle United (Overall winners) (round of 16, lost to AZ)
- (France) Auxerre (Group stage, fourth in Group A)
- (Switzerland) Grasshopper Zürich (Group stage, fifth in Group C)
- (Denmark) Odense (Group stage, fourth in Group D)
- (France) Marseille (First round, lost to Mladá Boleslav)
- (Germany) Hertha BSC (First round, lost to Odense)
- (Turkey) Kayserispor (First round, lost to AZ)
- (Cyprus) Ethnikos Achna (First round, lost to Lens)
- (Netherlands) Twente (Second qualifying round, lost to Levadia Tallinn)
- (Austria) Ried (Second qualifying round, lost to Sion)
- (Slovenia) Maribor (Second qualifying round, lost to Partizan)

== See also ==
- 2006–07 UEFA Champions League
- 2006–07 UEFA Cup
