= 2006 Kalmar FF season =

Kalmar FF
2006 season
- Manager: Nanne Bergstrand
- Stadium: Fredriksskans
- Allsvenskan: 5th
- Svenska Cupen: Semi-finals
- Intertoto Cup: Third round
- Top goalscorer: Ari (15)
- Average home league attendance: 5,198

The 2006 season was Kalmar FF's 96th season in existence and third consecutive season in the Allsvenskan. They also competed in the Svenska Cupen and the Intertoto Cup.

== Competitions ==
=== Overall record ===
Competition	First match	Last match	Starting round	Final position	Record							
Competition	First match	Last match	Starting round	Final position	Pld	W	D	L	GF	GA	GD	Win %
Allsvenskan	20 April 2006	5 November 2006	Matchday 1	5th	26	12	5	9	39	30	+9	46.15
Svenska Cupen	4 May 2006	19 October 2006	Second round	Semi-finals	5	4	1	0	14	7	+7	80.00
Intertoto Cup	17 June 2006	22 July 2006	First round	Third round	6	5	0	1	15	7	+8	83.33
Total					37	21	6	10	68	44	+24	56.76

Source: Competitions

=== Allsvenskan ===
==== League table ====
Pos	Team	Pld	W	D	L	GF	GA	GD	Pts	Qualification or relegation
3	Hammarby IF (Note: Hammarby were docked three points for a tumult in their home game against Djurgården on August 28, 2006.)	26	13	7	6	40	31	+9	43	Qualification to Intertoto Cup first round
4	Helsingborgs IF	26	11	9	6	44	34	+10	42	Qualification to UEFA Cup first qualifying round (Note: Helsingborg qualified for the UEFA Cup as Svenska Cupen champions 2006.)
5	Kalmar FF	26	12	5	9	39	30	+9	41	
6	Djurgårdens IF	26	11	7	8	31	25	+6	40	
7	Malmö FF	26	10	8	8	43	39	+4	38	

Source: svenskfotboll.se (in Swedish)
Rules for classification: 1) points; 2) goal difference; 3) number of goals scored.

==== Results summary ====
Overall								Home						Away					
Pld	W	D	L	GF	GA	GD	Pts	W	D	L	GF	GA	GD	W	D	L	GF	GA	GD
26	12	5	9	39	30	+9	41	5	2	6	19	18	+1	7	3	3	20	12	+8

==== Results by round ====
Round	1	2	3	4	5	6	7	8	9	10	11	12	13	14	15	16	17	18	19	20	21	22	23	24	25	26
Ground	H	A	H	A	H	A	H	A	H	A	H	A	A	H	A	H	A	H	A	H	A	H	A	H	A	H
Result	L	D	L	L	D	W	W	W	W	W	L	L	L	L	W	W	W	W	D	D	D	L	W	L	W	W
Position																										

A = Away; H = Home; W = Win; D = Draw; L = Loss

==== Matches ====
September 2023	v
--:-- CEST (UTC+2)

=== Svenska Cupen ===
4 May 2006 Second round	Skiljebo SK	2–3	Kalmar FF
--:-- CEST (UTC+2)

7 June 2006 Third round	Kalmar FF	4–1	AIK
--:-- CEST (UTC+2)

26 July 2006 Fourth round	Visby IF Gute FK	1–2 (a.e.t.)	Kalmar FF
--:-- CEST (UTC+2)

31 August 2006 Quarter-finals	Kalmar FF	4–2 (a.e.t.)	IFK Norrköping
--:-- CEST (UTC+2)

19 October 2006 Semi-finals	Kalmar FF	1–1 (a.e.t.) (3–4 p)	Gefle IF
--:-- CEST (UTC+2)

=== Intertoto Cup ===
==== First round ====
17 June 2006	Narva Trans (Estonia)	1–6	(Sweden) Kalmar FF	A. Le Coq Arena, Tallinn
	Kulatšenko 2'		Johansson 44'; Santin 62'; Ari 67', 86'; V. Elm 70'; Petersson 90+'	Attendance: 150; Referee: Nicole Petignat (Switzerland)

25 June 2006	Kalmar FF (Sweden)	2–0 (8–1 agg.)	(Estonia) Narva Trans	Fredriksskans, Kalmar
	R. Elm 7'; Ari 27'			Attendance: 678; Referee: Willie Collum (Scotland)

==== Second round ====
2 July 2006	Tampere United (Finland)	1–2	(Sweden) Kalmar FF	Ratinan Stadion, Tampere
	Sipiläinen 75'		Hasani 7', 69'	Attendance: 2,334; Referee: Jóhannes Valgeirsson (Iceland)

8 July 2006	Kalmar FF (Sweden)	3–2 (5–3 agg.)	(Finland) Tampere United	Fredriksskans, Kalmar
	Carlsson 38'; Hasani 67'; Koroma 90+'		Lehtinen 31'; Wiss 86'	Attendance: 1,099; Referee: David Malcolm (Northern Ireland)

==== Third round ====
15 July 2006	Kalmar FF (Sweden)	1–0	(Netherlands) Twente	Fredriksskans, Kalmar
	Blomberg 51' (pen.)			Attendance: 2,684; Referee: Martin Atkinson (England)

22 July 2006	Twente (Netherlands)	3–1 (3–2 agg.)	(Sweden) Kalmar FF	Arke Stadion, Enschede
	Touma 49', 73', 79'		Johansson 67'	Attendance: 11,500; Referee: Alfonso Pérez Burrull (Spain)
