= NK Maribor in European football =

Football club in international competitions

- Club: Maribor
- Seasons played: 33
- Most appearances: Marcos Tavares (94)
- Top scorer: Marcos Tavares (31)
- First entry: 1970–71 Mitropa Cup
- Latest entry: 2025–26 UEFA Conference League

Titles
- Intertoto Cup: 2006^{[A]}

Nogometni klub Maribor, also simply known as NK Maribor, is a Slovenian professional football club based in Maribor. The club have participated in 43 editions of the club competitions governed by the Union of European Football Associations (UEFA), the chief authority for football across Europe. These include 16 seasons in the UEFA Champions League, 17 seasons in the UEFA Cup and Europa League, five seasons in the UEFA Conference League, two seasons in the UEFA Cup Winners' Cup, and three seasons in the UEFA Intertoto Cup. Counting all of the 195 games the side have played in European competitions since their first entry into the Mitropa Cup in the 1970–71 season, the team's record stands at 68 wins, 48 draws, and 79 defeats as of match played 31 July 2025. The club's most recent participation in a continental competition was in the 2025–26 season, when they played in the qualifying rounds of the 2025–26 UEFA Conference League.

Maribor's 10–0 victory over Norma Tallinn of Estonia in the 1994–95 UEFA Cup Winners' Cup is the club's most decisive win in European competitions, while the team's heaviest defeat is 9–1, against the Dutch club Ajax in the 1997–98 UEFA Cup. Brazilian striker Marcos Tavares holds the club record for most appearances with 94, and is the club's record goalscorer in European competitions with 31 goals.

As of the 2026–27 season, Maribor is the only Slovenian club to have qualified for the group stage (rebranded as the league phase in 2024) of the UEFA Champions League, and is one of five clubs from the former Socialist Federal Republic of Yugoslavia to have participated in this phase of the competition since the breakup of the country in 1992. Maribor won their only European honour in 2006, when they defeated Villarreal in the third round of the 2006 UEFA Intertoto Cup, becoming one of the eleven co-winners of the competition.

== Background ==
Club competitions between teams from European countries can trace their origins as far back as 1897, when the Challenge Cup was created for clubs in Austria-Hungary. The Mitropa Cup, a competition modelled after the Challenge Cup, was created in 1927 and played between Central European clubs. The first continental competition organised by UEFA was the European Cup in 1955. Established as a competition for winners of the European national football leagues, it is considered the most prestigious European football competition. The European Cup was re-branded in 1992 as the UEFA Champions League. In the 1950s, two further competitions were created: the Inter-Cities Fairs Cup and UEFA Cup Winners' Cup. Established in 1955, the Inter-Cities Fairs Cup was later re-branded as the UEFA Cup when it came under the auspices of UEFA in 1971. Since the 2009–10 season, the competition has been known as UEFA Europa League. The UEFA Cup Winners' Cup was inaugurated in 1960 for the winners of domestic cup competitions.

== History ==
=== Yugoslav period: 1960–1991 ===
Before Slovenia's independence in 1991, Maribor competed in the Yugoslav football league system. When playing in the Yugoslav First League, Maribor never finished in positions which assured competing in UEFA competitions; the closest they came was in the 1969–70 season, when they finished tenth. Maribor made its debut in European competitions in the 1970–71 season, when it competed in the Mitropa Cup, a non-UEFA competition for Central European teams. Maribor were eliminated in the first round by the Austrian side Grazer AK on away goals rule, having won 3–1 at home and lost 2–0 away.

=== New country and UEFA debut: 1992–1996 ===
After the breakup of Yugoslavia, the Football Association of Slovenia established their own competitions. Maribor were the inaugural winners of the Slovenian Cup, where they defeated their biggest rivals Olimpija in the final. As the national cup winners, they qualified for the 1992–93 European Cup Winners' Cup. In the qualifying round, they played against Ħamrun Spartans from Malta. The first match was played on 19 August 1992 at Ljudski vrt, where Maribor won 4–0. This was the first ever match for Maribor in the official UEFA competitions. Fourteen days later they lost the second leg 2–1, but still managed to qualify for the first round with an aggregate score of 5–2. In the first round, they were drawn against the Spanish side Atlético Madrid. Maribor lost the first leg 3–0 at the home turf in front of 8,000 spectators, and later suffered a heavy defeat in the second leg in Madrid, where Atlético won 6–1. In the next season, Maribor played in the UEFA Cup for the first time. They reached the second round, where they were eliminated by Borussia Dortmund, 2–1 on aggregate. On 25 August 1994, Maribor played a historic game against Norma Tallinn from Estonia in the Cup Winners' Cup. This was the first match at Ljudski vrt under the floodlights, and also the biggest ever victory for Maribor in European competitions (10–0). In 1996, Maribor competed in the group stage of the 1996 UEFA Intertoto Cup. They defeated Austria Wien 3–0 at home in the first round, but in the next three games, they only managed to get one point, against Keflavík. Maribor lost the remaining two matches against two Scandinavian teams, København and Örebro, and finished in third place with four points.

=== Champions League: 1997–1999 ===

The lineup that defeated Dynamo Kyiv 1–0 in the UEFA Champions League.

In the 1996–97 season, Maribor won the national league for the first time. As the Slovenian champions, they started in the second qualifying round of the 1997–98 Champions League, where they eliminated Derry City from Ireland. In the last qualifying round before the group stages, they were drawn against the Turkish side Beşiktaş. Beşiktaş did not manage to win the first game at their own ground, as the game ended 0–0. However, Maribor lost the home leg 3–1 and were eliminated. They continued their European journey in the UEFA Cup, where they were eliminated by Ajax. The first game in Maribor ended with 1–1. In the return leg in Amsterdam, Maribor suffered their heaviest defeat in the European football, as Ajax won the match 9–1. In the next season, Maribor came very close to the group stages. After eliminating Kareda Šiauliai in the second qualifying round, they again reached the last qualifying round before the group stages. This time, they were drawn against another Dutch side, PSV Eindhoven. At Ljudski vrt, Peter Breznik scored in the 83rd minute for 2–1, and gave Maribor one goal advantage before visiting the Philips Stadion in Eindhoven. In the second leg, Dalibor Filipović scored in the fifth minute to give Maribor a 1–0 lead, but PSV responded immediately and equalised in the ninth minute. PSV scored another goal half an hour before the end, and the match went to extra time. Maribor eventually lost the game 4–2 and were eliminated. Again, they continued in the UEFA Cup, and as in the previous season were eliminated in the first round, this time by Wisła Kraków, losing both games.

In the 1999–2000 season, Maribor finally reached the group stages of the elite UEFA Champions League. They started their European triumph with a 5–1 home win against Racing Genk in the second qualifying round. In the second leg in Belgium, Genk were leading 3–0 and Maribor were down to ten players as Amir Karić was sent off, but the team managed to hold on and advanced 5–4 on aggregate. In the third qualifying round, Maribor faced Olympique Lyonnais. In the first leg in France, Filipović scored the only goal of the match two minutes before full-time. The demand for tickets for the second leg was so high that dozens of fans waited in line all night in front of the stadium to secure their tickets, as the capacity of the stadium at the time was only 7,500. In the second leg, Maribor defeated the French side 2–0, with goals from Ante Šimundža and Stipe Balajić in the first half, and the club reached the group stages for the first time. Maribor played in Group A with Bayer Leverkusen, Dynamo Kyiv, and Lazio. In the first round, Maribor defeated Dynamo 1–0 in Kyiv and topped the table; Šimundža became the first goal scorer for Maribor in the Champions League group stage after scoring in the 72nd minute. In the second round, Maribor lost 2–0 at home to Bayer Leverkusen; both goals were scored in the last eight minutes. Lazio then defeated Maribor twice, in the third and the fourth round. Both matches ended 4–0 for the Italian team. In the fifth round, Maribor lost 2–1 to Dynamo at home. In the final round, Maribor prevented Bayer from qualifying to the further stages; the match ended in a goalless draw, while Bayer needed a win to secure the second place in the group. Maribor were eliminated from the competition, finishing in the fourth and last place with four points.

=== Decline and Intertoto success: 2000–2008 ===
In each of the next four seasons, Maribor were eliminated in the second qualifying round of the Champions League. The decline of the club in European competitions started in the 2000–01 season, when Maribor were surprisingly knocked out of the Champions League in the second qualifying round by Zimbru Chişinău from Moldova. Maribor lost the first leg 2–0. In the return leg, Nastja Čeh scored the only goal of the game in the third minute, and Zimbru eliminated Maribor 2–1 on aggregate. In the 2001–02 season, Maribor were drawn against the Scottish side Rangers. The tie was already decided after the first match in Maribor, where Rangers won 3–0. In the second leg, Maribor took the lead at Ibrox Stadium in Glasgow, but Rangers then scored three times for 3–1, eliminating Maribor 6–1 on aggregate. In the 2002–03 season, Maribor were eliminated by APOEL. The first match in Maribor ended 2–1 for the home side, but APOEL won the return leg 4–2 in Cyprus, and Maribor were again eliminated in the second qualifying round. In the next year, they were eliminated by Dinamo Zagreb, 3–2 on aggregate. The match in Maribor ended 1–1, while in the second leg in Zagreb, the Croatian champions won 2–1 and advanced to the third qualifying round.

In the 2003–04 season, Maribor failed to win the national title for the first time since 1996, and therefore competed in the UEFA Cup for the 2004–05 season. They reached the first round, but were stopped by Parma. To reach the first round, Maribor eliminated Sileks from Macedonia and Budućnost Banatski Dvor from Serbia and Montenegro in the qualifying stages. Maribor did not qualify for European competitions for the 2005–06 season, having previously appeared in Europe in every season since the independence of Slovenia in 1991.

Maribor have returned to European football in the 2006–07 season, when the team won its first European honour, becoming one of the eleven co-winners of the 2006 UEFA Intertoto Cup. In the first round, Maribor defeated Sant Julià from Andorra, before eliminating Zeta who competed under the flag of newly established Montenegro. In the last round, Maribor played against Villarreal. The Spanish side played in the semi-finals of the Champions League just four months before the match between the two sides took place. In the first match in Spain, Rene Mihelič scored in the 83rd minute for a 2–1 win. Ljudski vrt was filled with fans in the second leg, as 9,500 people gathered to see the match. Villarreal, who had three players sent off during the game, took the lead in the 85th minute, but Gorazd Zajc equalized just four minutes later to make it 3–2 on aggregate. On their official website, UEFA states that Maribor were one of the winners of the competition. However, the trophy itself was awarded to Newcastle United, the team that advanced the farthest in the UEFA Cup in that season. As one of the winners of the Intertoto Cup, Maribor continued their European campaign in the UEFA Cup, where they were eliminated by Partizan in the second qualifying round.

In the next season, Maribor again competed in the Intertoto Cup. In the second round of the competition, the team lost 5–0 in the second leg against Hajduk Kula after winning the first match 2–0, being eliminated 5–2 on aggregate. After losing the 2007–08 Slovenian Cup final to Interblock, Maribor lost their place in European competitions for the 2008–09 season.

=== Zlatko Zahovič era: 2008–2020 ===
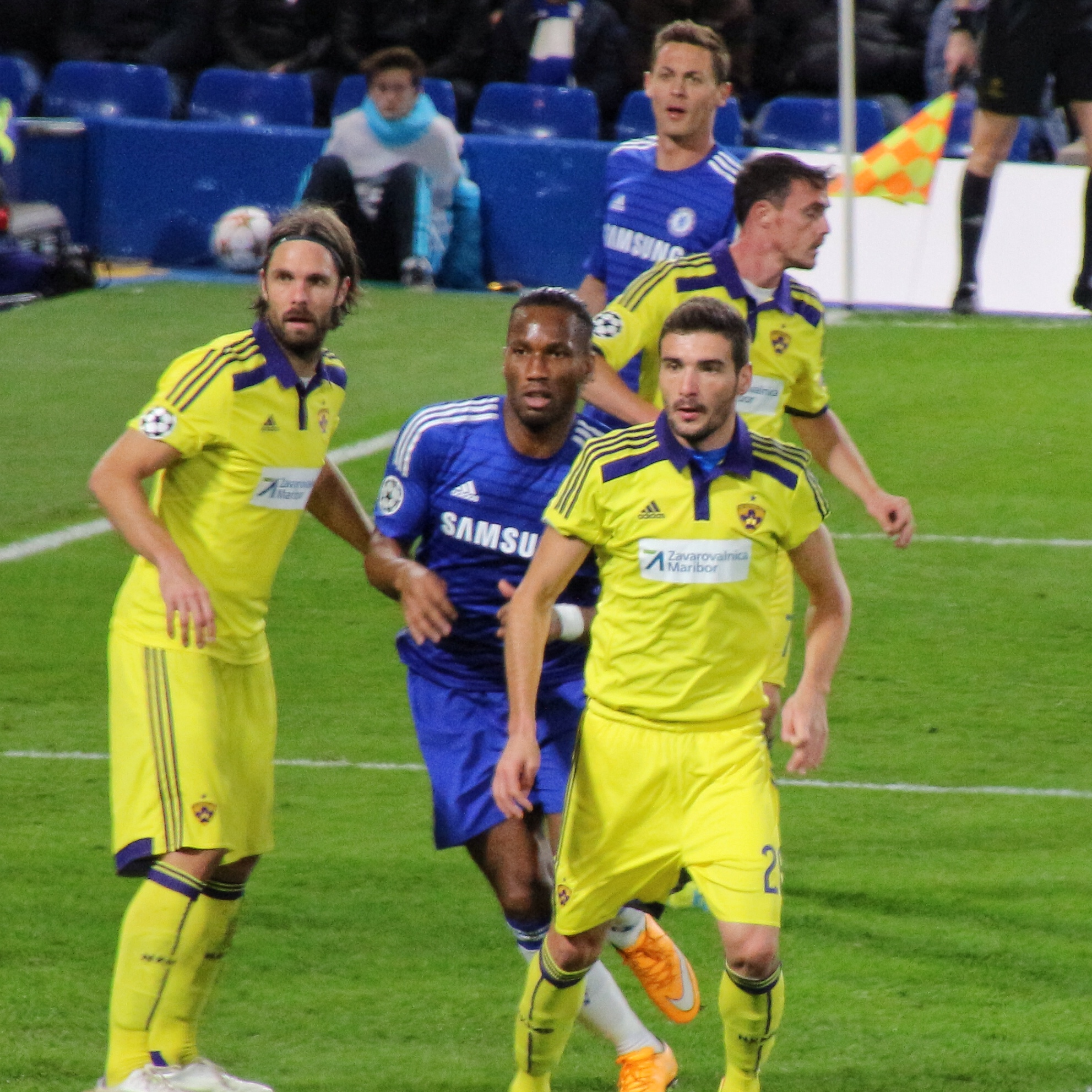
Maribor playing against Chelsea in 2014.

Maribor's Director of Football, Zlatko Zahovič, appointed Darko Milanič as the new manager in May 2008. In his first season, Maribor won the league title for the first time since 2003. In the 2009–10 UEFA Champions League, Maribor started in the second qualifying round against WIT from Georgia. The first match away from home ended scoreless. Maribor confirmed their spot in the third qualifying round at Ljudski vrt, where they won 3–1. They next played Zürich, and unexpectedly won the first match 3–2 at Letzigrund; Zoran Pavlović scored the third goal directly from a corner kick and later missed a penalty. 12,000 fans gathered for the second leg, where Maribor lost 3–0 and were eliminated. Maribor continued in the Europa League play-offs, but were eliminated by Sparta Prague 3–0 on aggregate. In the 2010–11 season, Maribor reached the play-offs of the UEFA Europa League. After eliminating Hungarian team Videoton and Hibernian from Scotland. In the play-off round, Maribor played against Palermo. The Italian side won the first leg 3–0 at the Stadio Renzo Barbera, while Maribor won the second leg 3–2, but were eliminated 5–3 on aggregate. Josip Iličić, who scored three goals during the European campaign, and Armin Bačinović both transferred to Palermo just one day after the match.

In the 2011–12 season, Maribor managed to reach the group stages of the Europa League for the first time. As the Slovenian champions, they entered in the second qualifying round of the Champions League, where they defeated F91 Dudelange, winning both games with 5–1 on aggregate. Maribor were once again stopped in the third qualifying round, this time by Maccabi Haifa, losing 3–2 on aggregate. For the Europa League play-offs, they were drawn against Rangers. At Ljudski vrt, Rangers were leading 1–0 after the first half, with Agim Ibraimi equalising early in the second half. Etien Velikonja scored the winning goal in extra time to give Maribor a win before the trip to Glasgow for the second leg. In the second leg, Rangers had 10 attempts on target and 13 off target, in addition to 16 corners. Still, Maribor managed to take the lead in the 55th minute, when Dalibor Volaš scored. Fifteen minutes before the end, Rangers equalised, but Maribor managed to hold on and eliminated Rangers 3–2 on aggregate. In the Europa League group stage, Maribor were drawn against the runners-up of the 2010–11 edition Braga, the 2010–11 Football League Cup winners Birmingham City, and Club Brugge. They lost five out of six games, only managing to draw with Braga at home. In the next season, Maribor reached the play-offs of the Champions League for the first time since the 1999–2000 season, but were eliminated by Dinamo Zagreb, 3–1 on aggregate. Maribor qualified for the Europa League group stages as one of the losers in the Champions League play-offs. This time, they managed to get four points, beating Panathinaikos and drawing with Tottenham Hotspur, both at Ljudski vrt. They lost both games against Lazio.

Maribor started their 2013–14 European campaign in the second qualifying round of the 2013–14 UEFA Champions League with a 2–0 aggregate victory over Birkirkara from Malta. In the third qualifying round, Maribor eliminated APOEL on away goals rule, securing their place in the play-off round for the second season in a row. However, Maribor once again lost in the play-off round and continued their European season in the group stages of the Europa League for the third time in a row. On 19 September 2013, the team played its first match in the group stage of the Europa League and were defeated by the Russian side Rubin Kazan. On 24 October 2013, Maribor defeated Zulte Waregem 3–1 in Belgium, securing their first ever away victory in the Europa League group stages. On 12 December 2013, Maribor defeated Wigan Athletic 2–1 and progressed beyond the group stage of a European competition for the first time, finishing second with seven points from six games. In the Round of 32, Maribor played in a two-legged tie against the Spanish side Sevilla (who later won the competition) and lost 3–2 on aggregate.

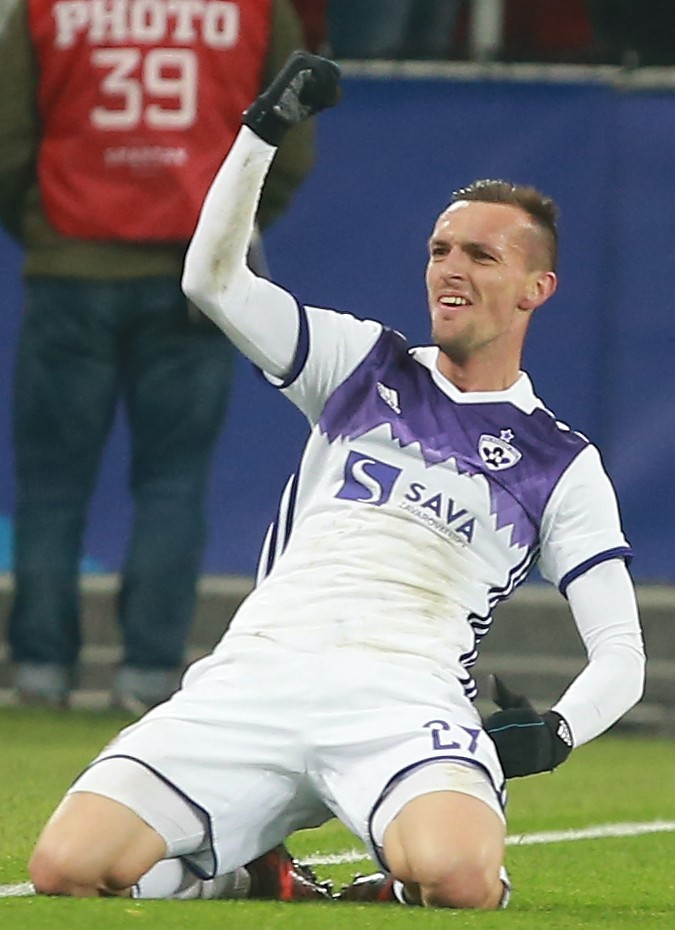
Jasmin Mešanović celebrating a last-minute equaliser in Moscow during the 2017–18 Champions League campaign.

After unsuccessful attempts in the previous two seasons, Maribor finally reached the group stages of the Champions League in the 2014–15 season. Led by former Maribor player Ante Šimundža, they eliminated Zrinjski Mostar, Maccabi Tel Aviv, and Celtic in the qualifying phase. Maribor had previously qualified for the group stages only once, in the 1999–2000 season. They were drawn in Group G with Chelsea, Schalke 04, and Sporting CP. They managed to obtain three points in six games after a draw and a defeat against each team. In the 2015–16 season, Maribor were eliminated from European competitions after only two matches as the team were eliminated by Astana in the second qualifying round of the Champions League, meaning the club failed to advance to the third qualifying round of the competition for the first time since the 2003–04 season. After failing to win the Slovenian League for the first time since 2009–10, Maribor qualified for the 2016–17 UEFA Europa League second qualifying round as the Slovenian Cup winners, where they were drawn against Bulgarian team Levski Sofia. After a goalless draw in the first leg at home, Maribor eliminated Levski on the away goals rule with an aggregate score of 1–1. Maribor defeated Aberdeen in the third qualifying round 2–1 on aggregate, and were eliminated in the play-off round by Gabala 3–2 on aggregate.

After one season of absence in the Champions League, Maribor won the national title again in the 2016–17 season, and started their European campaign in the second qualifying round of the 2017–18 UEFA Champions League. They were drawn against Zrinjski, whom they had previously played in 2014–15. Maribor won the first leg in Mostar 2–1, with Marcos Tavares scoring the winning goal in the 94th minute, and drew the second leg 1–1 at home to reach the third qualifying round. Tavares scored two more goals in the third qualifying round in a 2–0 aggregate victory over FH, helping Maribor to qualify for the play-off stage for the fourth time in six seasons. In the play-offs, Maribor eliminated Israeli side Hapoel Be'er-Sheva on away goals, after losing the first match 2–1 in Israel and winning the return leg 1–0 at home with a goal scored by Mitja Viler. Maribor had previously qualified for the group stage of the competition in the 1999–2000 and 2014–15 seasons. Maribor competed in Group E, along with Spartak Moscow, Sevilla, and Liverpool. As in the 2014–15 season, the club obtained three points in six matches after drawing with Sevilla at home and against Spartak twice with all three matches finishing 1–1. Their 7–0 defeat to Liverpool in the third match was the club's heaviest home defeat in European competitions, and their second highest European defeat overall.

Maribor's 2018–19 European campaign ended in the third qualifying round of the Europa League, where Maribor were eliminated by Rangers, 3–1 on aggregate. After winning their 15th national title in 2019, Maribor competed in the Champions League again in the 2019–20 season. After eliminating Valur and AIK in the first two qualifying rounds, the team was stopped in the third qualifying round by Rosenborg, losing both games with a score of 3–1. Maribor were also eliminated by Ludogorets Razgrad in the Europa League play-offs. In March 2020, Zahovič resigned as Maribor's Director of Football; in his 13 years with the club, Maribor experienced its most successful period in European football, reaching the Europa League group stages three times and the Champions League group stages twice. In the 2020–21 UEFA Europa League, Maribor were surprisingly eliminated in the first qualifying round by the semi-professional Northern Irish team Coleraine on penalties, which led to the dismissal of manager Sergej Jakirović.

== Records ==
All statistics in this section are correct as of 31 July 2025, after the match against Paks.

=== General records ===
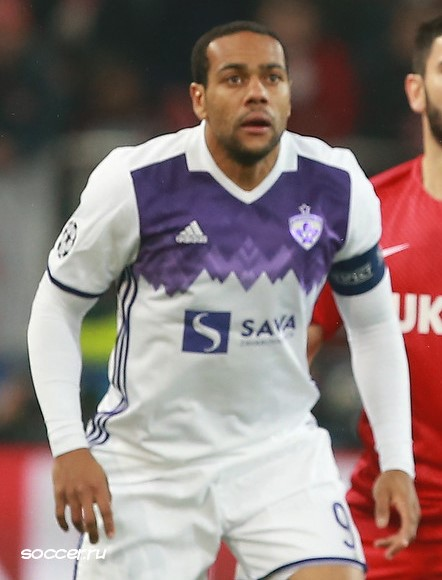
Marcos Tavares, the all-time top goalscorer for Maribor in European competitions

- Most appearances in European competition: Marcos Tavares, 94
- Most goals in European competition: Marcos Tavares, 31
- First European match: Grazer AK v. Maribor, 1970–71 Mitropa Cup first round, 14 October 1970
- First UEFA match: Maribor v. Ħamrun Spartans, 1992–93 UEFA Cup Winners' Cup qualifying round, 19 August 1992
- First goal scored in UEFA competition: Ante Šimundža, against Ħamrun Spartans
- Biggest win: 10–0, Maribor v. Norma Tallinn, 1994–95 UEFA Cup Winners' Cup, 25 August 1994
- Biggest defeat: 9–1, Ajax v. Maribor, 1997–98 UEFA Cup, 30 September 1997
- Highest European home attendance: 12,700, Maribor v. Sevilla, 2013–14 UEFA Europa League knockout phase, 20 February 2014

=== Top goalscorers ===
Below is the list of all-time top ten goalscorers for Maribor in European competitions. Including matches in UEFA Champions League, UEFA Cup / UEFA Europa League, UEFA Conference League, European Cup Winners' Cup / UEFA Cup Winners' Cup, UEFA Intertoto Cup, and each competition's associated qualifying rounds.

Key

- UCL = UEFA Champions League
- UEL = UEFA Cup / UEFA Europa League
- UEC = UEFA Conference League
- CWC = European Cup Winners' Cup / UEFA Cup Winners' Cup
- UIC = UEFA Intertoto Cup

List of Maribor players, who represented the team and scored goals in European competitions
Rank	Player	Maribor career	UCL	UEL	UEC	CWC	UIC	Total	Ref.
1	Marcos Tavares	2008–2022	17	14	0	0	0	31	
2	Dejan Mezga	2007–2014, 2016–2017	5	5	0	0	1	11	
3	Agim Ibraimi	2011–2016	6	3	0	0	0	9	
3	Ante Šimundža	1991–1996, 1997, 1999–2001	3	0	0	5	1	9	
5	Robert Berić	2010–2013	4	3	0	0	0	7	
5	Dalibor Volaš	2007–2010, 2011–2012, 2015	0	7	0	0	0	7	
7	Josip Iličić	2010, 2022–present	0	3	3	0	0	6	
7	Kliton Bozgo	1993–1995, 1998–2000, 2004–2005	0	1	0	5	0	6	
9	Stipe Balajić	1998–2005	5	0	0	0	0	5	
9	Rene Mihelič	2005–2010, 2020	1	1	0	0	3	5	
9	Gorazd Zajc	2005–2006, 2007–2009	0	1	0	0	4	5	

=== By season ===
Key

- P = Played
- W = Games won
- D = Games drawn
- L = Games lost
- F = Goals for
- A = Goals against
- GD = Goal difference
- R1 = First round
- R2 = Second round
- R3 = Third round
- R32 = Round of 32
- G = Group stage
- QR = Qualifying round
- PR = Play-off round

Key to colours:

Gold	Winners

Maribor record in European football by season
Season	Competition	P	W	D	L	F	A	Round
1970–71	Mitropa Cup	2	1	0	1	3	3	R1
1992–93	European Cup Winners' Cup	4	1	0	3	6	11	R1
1993–94	UEFA Cup	4	1	2	1	3	2	R2
1994–95	UEFA Cup Winners' Cup	4	2	1	1	15	5	R1
1995–96	UEFA Cup	4	1	0	3	3	6	R1
1996–97	UEFA Intertoto Cup	4	1	1	2	4	5	G
1997–98	UEFA Champions League	4	2	1	1	4	3	QR
1997–98	UEFA Cup	2	0	1	1	2	10	R1
1998–99	UEFA Champions League	4	3	0	1	7	5	QR
1998–99	UEFA Cup	2	0	0	2	0	5	R1
1999–2000	UEFA Champions League	10	4	1	5	10	16	G
2000–01	UEFA Champions League	2	1	0	1	1	2	QR
2001–02	UEFA Champions League	2	0	0	2	1	6	QR
2002–03	UEFA Champions League	2	1	0	1	4	5	QR
2003–04	UEFA Champions League	2	0	1	1	2	3	QR
2004–05	UEFA Cup	6	2	2	2	6	6	R1
2006–07	UEFA Intertoto Cup	6	5	1	0	15	3	R3
2006–07	UEFA Cup	2	0	1	1	2	3	QR
2007–08	UEFA Intertoto Cup	4	3	0	1	7	6	R2
2009–10	UEFA Champions League	4	2	1	1	6	6	QR
2009–10	UEFA Europa League	2	0	0	2	0	3	PR
2010–11	UEFA Europa League	6	4	1	1	12	8	PR
2011–12	UEFA Champions League	4	2	1	1	7	4	QR
2011–12	UEFA Europa League	8	1	2	5	9	17	G
2012–13	UEFA Champions League	6	4	0	2	12	6	PR
2012–13	UEFA Europa League	6	1	1	4	6	10	G
2013–14	UEFA Champions League	6	1	3	2	4	5	PR
2013–14	UEFA Europa League	8	2	2	4	12	16	R32
2014–15	UEFA Champions League	12	3	6	3	11	16	G
2015–16	UEFA Champions League	2	1	0	1	2	3	QR
2016–17	UEFA Europa League	6	2	3	1	5	5	PR
2017–18	UEFA Champions League	12	4	4	4	10	20	G
2018–19	UEFA Europa League	6	3	2	1	6	3	QR
2019–20	UEFA Champions League	6	3	0	3	11	10	QR
2019–20	UEFA Europa League	2	0	2	0	2	2	PR
2020–21	UEFA Europa League	1	0	1	0	1	1	QR
2021–22	UEFA Europa Conference League	4	2	0	2	3	4	QR
2022–23	UEFA Champions League	4	1	2	1	2	1	QR
2022–23	UEFA Europa League	2	0	0	2	0	3	QR
2022–23	UEFA Europa Conference League	2	0	1	1	0	1	PR
2023–24	UEFA Europa Conference League	6	2	2	2	9	12	QR
2024–25	UEFA Europa League	2	0	1	1	3	4	QR
2024–25	UEFA Conference League	6	2	0	4	6	7	PR
2025–26	UEFA Conference League	2	0	1	1	1	2	QR

=== By competition ===
Maribor record in European football by competition
European competitions
Competition	P	W	D	L	F	A	GD	Win%
UEFA Champions League	82	32	20	30	94	111	−17	39.02
UEFA Europa League^{[B]}	69	17	21	31	72	104	−32	24.64
UEFA Conference League^{[C]}	20	6	4	10	19	26	−7	30.00
UEFA Cup Winners' Cup^{[D]}	8	3	1	4	21	16	+5	37.50
UEFA Intertoto Cup	14	9	2	3	26	14	+12	64.29
Mitropa Cup	2	1	0	1	3	3	+0	50.00
Total	195	68	48	79	235	274	−39	34.87

=== By country ===
Maribor record in European football by country
Country	P	W	D	L	F	A	GD	Win%
Albania	2	2	0	0	3	0	+3	100.00
Andorra	2	2	0	0	8	0	+8	100.00
Armenia	2	2	0	0	2	0	+2	100.00
Austria	5	2	1	2	7	7	+0	40.00
Azerbaijan	2	1	0	1	2	3	−1	50.00
Belarus	2	1	1	0	2	0	+2	50.00
Belgium	6	2	0	4	11	12	−1	33.33
Bosnia and Herzegovina	6	4	2	0	11	4	+7	66.67
Bulgaria	6	0	5	1	6	7	−1	0.00
Croatia	4	0	1	3	3	6	−3	0.00
Cyprus	4	1	2	1	5	6	−1	25.00
Czech Republic	4	0	0	4	1	7	−6	0.00
Denmark	1	0	0	1	0	1	−1	0.00
England	10	1	2	7	7	28	−21	10.00
Estonia	2	2	0	0	14	1	+13	100.00
Finland	2	0	0	2	0	3	−3	0.00
France	2	2	0	0	3	0	+3	100.00
Georgia	4	2	2	0	5	1	+4	50.00
Germany	6	0	3	3	2	6	−4	0.00
Greece	4	1	0	3	4	6	−2	25.00
Hungary	4	1	2	1	4	3	+1	25.00
Iceland	5	4	1	0	7	0	+7	80.00
Israel	6	2	2	2	7	7	+0	33.33
Italy	8	1	1	6	6	21	−15	12.50
Kazakhstan	2	1	0	1	2	3	−1	50.00
Latvia	2	1	0	1	2	1	+1	50.00
Lithuania	2	2	0	0	4	0	+4	100.00
Luxembourg	6	5	1	0	15	6	+9	83.33
Malta	8	5	2	1	15	5	+10	62.50
Moldova	4	1	1	2	1	3	−2	25.00
Montenegro^{[E]}	2	2	0	0	4	1	+3	100.00
Netherlands	4	1	1	2	5	15	−10	25.00
North Macedonia	2	1	1	0	2	1	+1	50.00
Northern Ireland	1	0	1	0	1	1	+0	0.00
Norway	2	0	0	2	2	6	−4	0.00
Poland	2	0	0	2	0	5	−5	0.00
Portugal	4	0	2	2	4	10	−6	0.00
Republic of Ireland	2	2	0	0	3	0	+3	100.00
Romania	6	2	2	2	6	4	+2	33.33
Russia	4	0	3	1	5	8	−3	0.00
Scotland	12	5	4	3	15	15	+0	41.67
Serbia^{[F]}	8	3	1	4	8	12	−4	37.50
Spain	8	1	3	4	8	19	−11	12.50
Sweden	7	1	0	6	6	14	−8	14.29
Switzerland	2	1	0	1	3	5	−2	50.00
Turkey	4	0	1	3	2	9	−7	0.00
Ukraine	2	1	0	1	2	2	+0	50.00
Total	195	68	48	79	235	274	−39	34.87

== Matches ==
All results (home and away) list Maribor's goal tally first.

Maribor results in European competitions
Season	Competition	Round	Opposition	Home	Away	Aggregate
1970–71	Mitropa Cup	First round	(Austria) Grazer AK	3–1	0–2	3–3 (a)
1992–93	European Cup Winners' Cup	Qualifying round	(Malta) Ħamrun Spartans	4–0	1–2	5–2
1992–93	European Cup Winners' Cup	First round	(Spain) Atlético Madrid	0–3	1–6	1–9
1993–94	UEFA Cup	First round	(Romania) Gloria Bistriţa	2–0	0–0	2–0
1993–94	UEFA Cup	Second round	(Germany) Borussia Dortmund	0–0	1–2	1–2
1994–95	UEFA Cup Winners' Cup	Qualifying round	(Estonia) Norma Tallinn	10–0	4–1	14–1
1994–95	UEFA Cup Winners' Cup	First round	Austria Wien	1–1	0–3	1–4
1995–96	UEFA Cup	Qualifying round	(Latvia) Skonto	2–0	0–1	2–1
1995–96	UEFA Cup	First round	(Greece) Olympiacos	1–3	0–2	1–5
1996–97	UEFA Intertoto Cup	Group stage	Austria Wien	3–0	—	—
1996–97	UEFA Intertoto Cup	Group stage	(Iceland) Keflavík	—	0–0	—
1996–97	UEFA Intertoto Cup	Group stage	(Denmark) København	0–1	—	—
1996–97	UEFA Intertoto Cup	Group stage	(Sweden) Örebro	—	1–4	—
1997–98	UEFA Champions League	Second qualifying round	(Republic of Ireland) Derry City	1–0	2–0	3–0
1997–98	UEFA Champions League	Third qualifying round	(Turkey) Beşiktaş	1–3	0–0	1–3
1997–98	UEFA Cup	First round	(Netherlands) Ajax	1–1	1–9	2–10
1998–99	UEFA Champions League	Second qualifying round	(Lithuania) Kareda Šiauliai	1–0	3–0	4–0
1998–99	UEFA Champions League	Third qualifying round	(Netherlands) PSV	2–1	1–4 (a.e.t.)	3–5
1998–99	UEFA Cup	First round	(Poland) Wisła Kraków	0–2	0–3	0–5
1999–2000	UEFA Champions League	Second qualifying round	(Belgium) Racing Genk	5–1	0–3	5–4
1999–2000	UEFA Champions League	Third qualifying round	(France) Olympique Lyonnais	2–0	1–0	3–0
1999–2000	UEFA Champions League	Group stage	(Ukraine) Dynamo Kyiv	1–2	1–0	—
1999–2000	UEFA Champions League	Group stage	(Germany) Bayer Leverkusen	0–2	0–0	—
1999–2000	UEFA Champions League	Group stage	(Italy) Lazio	0–4	0–4	—
2000–01	UEFA Champions League	Second qualifying round	(Moldova) Zimbru Chişinău	1–0	0–2	1–2
2001–02	UEFA Champions League	Second qualifying round	(Scotland) Rangers	0–3	1–3	1–6
2002–03	UEFA Champions League	Second qualifying round	(Cyprus) APOEL	2–1	2–4	4–5
2003–04	UEFA Champions League	Second qualifying round	(Croatia) Dinamo Zagreb	1–1	1–2	2–3
2004–05	UEFA Cup	First qualifying round	(North Macedonia) Sileks	1–1	1–0	2–1
2004–05	UEFA Cup	Second qualifying round	(Serbia and Montenegro) Budućnost Banatski Dvor	0–1	2–1	2–2 (a)
2004–05	UEFA Cup	First round	(Italy) Parma	0–0	2–3	2–3
2006–07	UEFA Intertoto Cup	First round	(Andorra) Sant Julià	5–0	3–0	8–0
2006–07	UEFA Intertoto Cup	Second round	(Montenegro) Zeta	2–0	2–1	4–1
2006–07	UEFA Intertoto Cup	Third round	(Spain) Villarreal	1–1	2–1	3–2
2006–07	UEFA Cup	Second qualifying round	(Serbia) Partizan	1–1	1–2	2–3
2007–08	UEFA Intertoto Cup	First round	(Malta) Birkirkara	2–1	3–0	5–1
2007–08	UEFA Intertoto Cup	Second round	(Serbia) Hajduk Kula	2–0	0–5	2–5
2009–10	UEFA Champions League	Second qualifying round	(Georgia (country)) WIT Georgia	3–1	0–0	3–1
2009–10	UEFA Champions League	Third qualifying round	(Switzerland) Zürich	0–3	3–2	3–5
2009–10	UEFA Europa League	Play-off round	(Czech Republic) Sparta Prague	0–2	0–1	0–3
2010–11	UEFA Europa League	Second qualifying round	(Hungary) Videoton	2–0	1–1	3–1
2010–11	UEFA Europa League	Third qualifying round	(Scotland) Hibernian	3–0	3–2	6–2
2010–11	UEFA Europa League	Play-off round	(Italy) Palermo	3–2	0–3	3–5
2011–12	UEFA Champions League	Second qualifying round	(Luxembourg) F91 Dudelange	2–0	3–1	5–1
2011–12	UEFA Champions League	Third qualifying round	(Israel) Maccabi Haifa	1–1	1–2	2–3
2011–12	UEFA Europa League	Play-off round	(Scotland) Rangers	2–1	1–1	3–2
2011–12	UEFA Europa League	Group stage	(Belgium) Club Brugge	3–4	0–2	—
2011–12	UEFA Europa League	Group stage	(England) Birmingham City	1–2	0–1	—
2011–12	UEFA Europa League	Group stage	(Portugal) Braga	1–1	1–5	—
2012–13	UEFA Champions League	Second qualifying round	(Bosnia and Herzegovina) Željezničar Sarajevo	4–1	2–1	6–2
2012–13	UEFA Champions League	Third qualifying round	(Luxembourg) F91 Dudelange	4–1	1–0	5–1
2012–13	UEFA Champions League	Play-off round	(Croatia) Dinamo Zagreb	0–1	1–2	1–3
2012–13	UEFA Europa League	Group stage	(Greece) Panathinaikos	3–0	0–1	—
2012–13	UEFA Europa League	Group stage	(Italy) Lazio	1–4	0–1	—
2012–13	UEFA Europa League	Group stage	(England) Tottenham Hotspur	1–1	1–3	—
2013–14	UEFA Champions League	Second qualifying round	(Malta) Birkirkara	2–0	0–0	2–0
2013–14	UEFA Champions League	Third qualifying round	(Cyprus) APOEL	0–0	1–1	1–1 (a)
2013–14	UEFA Champions League	Play-off round	(Czech Republic) Viktoria Plzeň	0–1	1–3	1–4
2013–14	UEFA Europa League	Group stage	(Russia) Rubin Kazan	2–5	1–1	—
2013–14	UEFA Europa League	Group stage	(England) Wigan Athletic	2–1	1–3	—
2013–14	UEFA Europa League	Group stage	(Belgium) Zulte Waregem	0–1	3–1	—
2013–14	UEFA Europa League	Round of 32	(Spain) Sevilla	2–2	1–2	3–4
2014–15	UEFA Champions League	Second qualifying round	(Bosnia and Herzegovina) Zrinjski Mostar	2–0	0–0	2–0
2014–15	UEFA Champions League	Third qualifying round	(Israel) Maccabi Tel Aviv	1–0	2–2	3–2
2014–15	UEFA Champions League	Play-off round	(Scotland) Celtic	1–1	1–0	2–1
2014–15	UEFA Champions League	Group stage	(Portugal) Sporting CP	1–1	1–3	—
2014–15	UEFA Champions League	Group stage	(Germany) Schalke 04	0–1	1–1	—
2014–15	UEFA Champions League	Group stage	(England) Chelsea	1–1	0–6	—
2015–16	UEFA Champions League	Second qualifying round	(Kazakhstan) Astana	1–0	1–3	2–3
2016–17	UEFA Europa League	Second qualifying round	(Bulgaria) Levski Sofia	0–0	1–1	1–1 (a)
2016–17	UEFA Europa League	Third qualifying round	(Scotland) Aberdeen	1–0	1–1	2–1
2016–17	UEFA Europa League	Play-off round	(Azerbaijan) Gabala	1–0	1–3	2–3
2017–18	UEFA Champions League	Second qualifying round	(Bosnia and Herzegovina) Zrinjski Mostar	1–1	2–1	3–2
2017–18	UEFA Champions League	Third qualifying round	(Iceland) FH	1–0	1–0	2–0
2017–18	UEFA Champions League	Play-off round	(Israel) Hapoel Be'er Sheva	1–0	1–2	2–2 (a)
2017–18	UEFA Champions League	Group stage	(Russia) Spartak Moscow	1–1	1–1	—
2017–18	UEFA Champions League	Group stage	(Spain) Sevilla	1–1	0–3	—
2017–18	UEFA Champions League	Group stage	(England) Liverpool	0–7	0–3	—
2018–19	UEFA Europa League	First qualifying round	(Albania) Partizani	2–0	1–0	3–0
2018–19	UEFA Europa League	Second qualifying round	(Georgia (country)) Chikhura Sachkhere	2–0	0–0	2–0
2018–19	UEFA Europa League	Third qualifying round	(Scotland) Rangers	0–0	1–3	1–3
2019–20	UEFA Champions League	First qualifying round	(Iceland) Valur	2–0	3–0	5–0
2019–20	UEFA Champions League	Second qualifying round	(Sweden) AIK	2–1	2–3 (a.e.t.)	4–4 (a)
2019–20	UEFA Champions League	Third qualifying round	(Norway) Rosenborg	1–3	1–3	2–6
2019–20	UEFA Europa League	Play-off round	(Bulgaria) Ludogorets Razgrad	2–2	0–0	2–2 (a)
2020–21	UEFA Europa League	First qualifying round	(Northern Ireland) Coleraine	1–1 (4–5 p)	—	—
2021–22	UEFA Europa Conference League	First qualifying round	(Armenia) Urartu	1–0	1–0	2–0
2021–22	UEFA Europa Conference League	Second qualifying round	(Sweden) Hammarby IF	0–1	1–3	1–4
2022–23	UEFA Champions League	First qualifying round	(Belarus) Shakhtyor Soligorsk	0–0	2–0	2–0
2022–23	UEFA Champions League	Second qualifying round	(Moldova) Sheriff Tiraspol	0–0	0–1	0−1
2022–23	UEFA Europa League	Third qualifying round	(Finland) HJK	0–2	0–1	0–3
2022–23	UEFA Europa Conference League	Play-off round	(Romania) CFR Cluj	0–0	0–1	0−1
2023–24	UEFA Europa Conference League	First qualifying round	(Malta) Birkirkara	1–1	2–1	3–2
2023–24	UEFA Europa Conference League	Second qualifying round	(Luxembourg) Differdange 03	4–3 (a.e.t.)	1–1	5–4
2023–24	UEFA Europa Conference League	Third qualifying round	(Turkey) Fenerbahçe	0–3	1–3	1–6
2024–25	UEFA Europa League	First qualifying round	(Bulgaria) Botev Plovdiv	2–2	1–2	3–4
2024–25	UEFA Conference League	Second qualifying round	(Romania) Universitatea Craiova	2–0	2–3	4–3
2024–25	UEFA Conference League	Third qualifying round	(Serbia) Vojvodina	2–1	0–1 (a.e.t.)	2–2 (4–2 p)
2024–25	UEFA Conference League	Play-off round	(Sweden) Djurgården	0–1	0–1	0–2
2025–26	UEFA Conference League	Second qualifying round	(Hungary) Paks	1–1	0–1	1–2

Colour key: Green = Maribor win; Yellow = draw; Red = opponents win.

== UEFA coefficient ==
In European football, the UEFA coefficients are statistics used for ranking and seeding teams in club and international competitions. The table below shows Maribor's current position, based on their UEFA coefficient club ranking, together with four other clubs which are closest to Maribor's position (two clubs with a higher coefficient and two with a lower or identical one).

As of 1 September 2024

Rank	Team	2020–21	2021–22	2022–23	2023–24	2024–25	Total	National association
136	Santa Clara	—	2.500	—	—	—	2.500	9.643
137	Rio Ave	2.500	—	—	—	—	2.500	9.643
138	Maribor	1.000	1.500	2.500	2.000	2.500	9.500	2.975
139	AEK Athens	3.000	1.500	—	3.000	2.000	9.500	5.900
140	HJK Helsinki	—	4.000	3.000	2.500	0.000	9.500	2.200

== Footnotes ==
- ^{A} On their official website, UEFA states that Maribor have won one international cup, as the club was one of the eleven co-winners of the UEFA Intertoto Cup in 2006. However, the trophy itself was awarded to Newcastle United, the team that advanced the farthest in the UEFA Cup in that season.
- ^{B} Before the 2009–10 season, the competition was known as UEFA Cup.
- ^{C} Before the 2024–25 season, the competition was known as UEFA Europa Conference League.
- ^{D} Before the 1994–95 season, the competition was known as European Cup Winners' Cup.
- ^{E} Montenegro gained independence on 3 June 2006, and at the time of the 2006 UEFA Intertoto Cup matches against Maribor, Zeta was already a member of the Football Association of Montenegro. Zeta had qualified for the competition as a member of the Football Association of Serbia and Montenegro.
- ^{F} Includes Serbia and Montenegro.
