= Balis =

Balis may refer to:

- Balis (Syria), an ancient and medieval fortress on the Euphrates River
- Usog, a belief in Philippine pseudoscience
- Bališ, a surname

== See also ==
- Bali (disambiguation)
