= Bališ =

Origin
- Region of origin: Slovakia

Bališ is a surname. It may refer to:

- Boris Bališ (born 1993), Slovak football winger
- Denis Bališ (born 1992), Slovak football defender
- Igor Bališ (born 1970), Slovak football defender
- Milan Bališ, Slovak ice hockey player
- Slavomír Bališ (born 1985), Slovak football midfielder
