= 1970–71 Mitropa Cup =

Tournament details
- Teams: 16

Final positions
- Champions: (Socialist Federal Republic of Yugoslavia) Čelik Zenica (1st title)
- Runners-up: Austria Salzburg

Tournament statistics
- Matches played: 29
- Goals scored: 70 (2.41 per match)

The 1970–71 Mitropa Cup was the 31st season of the Mitropa Cup, a football tournament for European clubs. It was won by Čelik Zenica who beat Austria Salzburg 3–1 in the final.

== Round of 16 ==
Team 1	Agg.	Team 2	1st leg	2nd leg
Vasas (Hungary)	3–4	Austria Salzburg	3–1	0–3
Radnički Kragujevac (Socialist Federal Republic of Yugoslavia)	1–3	(Italy) Lanerossi Vicenza	1–0	0–3
Torino (Italy)	2–3 (a.e.t.)	(Hungary) MTK	1–1	1–2
LASK Linz (Austria)	1–5	(Czechoslovakia) Škoda Plzeň	1–1	0–4
Grazer AK (Austria)	3–3 (a)	(Socialist Federal Republic of Yugoslavia) Maribor	2–0	1–3
Slavia Prague (Czechoslovakia)	0–2	(Hungary) Csepel	0–2	0–0
Diósgyör (Hungary)	2–0	(Czechoslovakia) Lokomotíva Košice	2–0	0–0
Čelik Zenica (Socialist Federal Republic of Yugoslavia)	3–1	(Italy) Catania	3–0	0–1

== Quarter-finals ==
Team 1	Agg.	Team 2	1st leg	2nd leg
Grazer AK (Austria)	1–2	(Hungary) MTK	0–0	1–2
Csepel (Hungary)	1–1 (a)	(Czechoslovakia) Škoda Plzeň	0–0	1–1
Diósgyör (Hungary)	2–4	(Socialist Federal Republic of Yugoslavia) Čelik Zenica	1–0	1–4
Lanerossi Vicenza (Italy)	4–5	Austria Salzburg	3–2	1–3

== Semi-finals ==
Team 1	Agg.	Team 2	1st leg	2nd leg
Csepel (Hungary)	3–4	Austria Salzburg	2–0	1–4
Čelik Zenica (Socialist Federal Republic of Yugoslavia)	2–1	(Hungary) MTK	1–0	1–1

== Final ==
22 September 1971
15:00

Čelik Zenica (Socialist Federal Republic of Yugoslavia)	3–1	Austria Salzburg
Mićić 28'; Mujkić 42' (pen.); Radulović 73'	Report	Kibler 68'

Stadio Comunale, Gorizia
Attendance: 2,500
Referee: Paolo Toselli (Italy)

== See also ==
- 1970–71 European Cup
- 1970–71 European Cup Winners' Cup
- 1970–71 Inter-Cities Fairs Cup
