= Naor Peser =

Israeli footballer

Personal information
- Full name: Naor Peser
- Date of birth: October 15, 1985 (age 41)
- Place of birth: Hadera, Israel
- Height: 1.80 m (5 ft 11 in)
- Position: Defender

Youth career
- Maccabi Petah Tikva

Senior career*
Years	Team	Apps	(Gls)
2006–2019	Maccabi Petah Tikva	250	(6)
2010–2012	→ Hapoel Ramat HaSharon (loan)	60	(3)
2019–2020	Hapoel Marmorek	14	(0)
2020–2021	Hapoel Ashkelon	17	(0)
2021–2022	Hapoel Hod HaSharon	21	(0)

International career
2002–2007	Israel U21	15	(1)
- * Club domestic league appearances and goals

Naor Peser (Hebrew: נאור פסר; born October 15, 1985) is a former Israeli footballer. He previously played in the Israeli Premier League for Maccabi Petah Tikva and Hapoel Ramat HaSharon.
