= Slavomír Bališ =

Slovak footballer

Personal information
- Full name: Slavomír Bališ
- Date of birth: 26 September 1985 (age 41)
- Place of birth: Czechoslovakia
- Height: 1.75 m (5 ft 9 in)
- Position: Midfielder

Team information
- Current team: FKM Nové Zámky
- Number: 7

Youth career
- Nitra

Senior career*
Years	Team	Apps	(Gls)
–	Nitra	59	(2)
2011	→FK Bodva loan	13	(1)
2012–	→Nové Zámky loan		
- * Club domestic league appearances and goals as of 11 March 2012

Slavomír Bališ (born 26 September 1985) is a Slovak football midfielder who recently played for the 3. liga club FKM Nové Zámky, on loan from FC Nitra.
