= Ville Lehtinen =

Finnish footballer (born 1978)

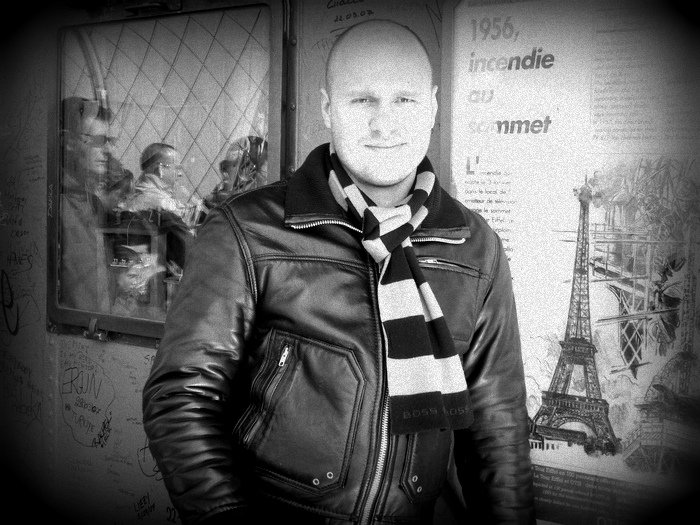
- A Finnish former footballer

Personal information
- Full name: Ville Antti Lehtinen
- Date of birth: 17 December 1978 (age 47)
- Place of birth: Toijala, Finland
- Height: 6 ft 0 in (1.83 m)
- Position: Striker

Youth career
- JJK

Senior career*
Years	Team	Apps	(Gls)
1997	HJK	2	(0)
1997–98	Sheffield United	0	(0)
1999	Jazz	23	(1)
2000	Pallo-Iirot	23	(3)
2001–2002	Tampere United	48	(13)
2002–2004	Bodø/Glimt	20	(1)
2005	AC Allianssi	10	(1)
2005–2006	Tampere United	36	(19)
2007	Atlantis	2	(0)
2007	AC Oulu	11	(1)
- * Club domestic league appearances and goals as of 31 December 2007

Ville Antti Lehtinen (born 17 December 1978) is a Finnish former footballer.

As a junior Lehtinen played for Jyväskylän Jalkapalloklubi. He made his first-team debut in Finland's top division Veikkausliiga for Helsingin Jalkapalloklubi in 1997. He played only two games before moving to Sheffield United. He played only in youth and reserve team matches for Sheffield United .

In December 1998 Lehtinen returned to Finland and practised with FC Inter Turku. Inter and Lehtinen had some controversy regarding the contract between them. Inter claimed that Lehtinen was only for trial in the team, but Lehtinen claimed he had signed a one-year contract with Inter. Inter won the court battle, and in 1999 Lehtinen played for FC Jazz from Pori. In 2000, he played with Pallo-Iirot from Rauma.

In 2001 Lehtinen joined Tampere United. He made seven goals and won the Finnish championship. During the season 2002 he moved to Norwegian F.K. Bodø/Glimt. He spent three years in Norway before returning to Finland and AC Allianssi. With Allianssi he won the Finnish League Cup in 2005. After Allianssi was drifted to match fixing scandal, Lehtinen returned to Tampere United during the season. In 2006, he was the best goalscorer for the team and again won the Finnish championship. After the season, he traveled to England doing trials for many clubs like Leeds United and also tried to sign contract with FC Honka from Espoo. However no contract was made and Lehtinen decided to end his football career and concentrate on his job as an investment manager. In July 2007 Lehtinen decided come back to football fields. He played two games in Atlantis FC in Ykkönen (the second tier) before the contract with Veikkausliiga team AC Oulu was announced.

He is also a musician and his first single Naapurintyttö was released in 2006. Many Finnish radio stations have played his music.

== Career statistics ==
As of 1 September 2024.

Appearances and goals by club, season and competition
Club	Season	League			Cup (Note: Includes Suomen Cup and Norwegian Football Cup)		Europe		Total	
Club	Season	Division	Apps	Goals	Apps	Goals	Apps	Goals	Apps	Goals
JJK	1995	Kakkonen								
JJK	1996	Ykkönen								
JJK	Total		33	3	0	0	0	0	33	3
HJK	1997	Veikkausliiga	2	0	–		–		2	0
Jazz	1999	Veikkausliiga	23	1	–		–		23	1
Pallo-Iirot	2000	Ykkönen	23	3	–		–		23	3
Tampere United	2001	Veikkausliiga	31	7	1	0	–		32	7
Tampere United	2002	Veikkausliiga	17	6	–		1 (Note: Appearance(s) in UEFA Champions League)	0	18	6
Tampere United	Total		48	13	1	0	1	0	50	13
Bodø/Glimt	2002	Tippeligaen	6	0	–		–		6	0
Bodø/Glimt	2003	Tippeligaen	11	1	2	3	–		13	4
Bodø/Glimt	2004	Tippeligaen	3	0	2	0	–		5	0
Bodø/Glimt	Total		20	1	4	3	0	0	24	4
AC Allianssi	2005	Veikkausliiga	10	1	–		–		10	1
Tampere United	2005	Veikkausliiga	15	7	–		1 (Note: Appearance(s) in UEFA Intertoto Cup)	0	16	7
Tampere United	2006	Veikkausliiga	21	11	–		4	5	25	16
Tampere United	Total		36	18	0	0	5	5	41	23
Atlantis	2007	Ykkönen	2	0	–		–		2	0
AC Oulu	2007	Veikkausliiga	11	1	–		–		11	1
Career total			208	41	5	3	6	5	219	49
