= Gorazd Zajc =

Slovenian footballer (born 1987)

Personal information
- Date of birth: 28 December 1987 (age 38)
- Place of birth: Maribor, SFR Yugoslavia
- Height: 1.73 m (5 ft 8 in)
- Position: Forward

Youth career
- Dogoše
- Kovinar Maribor
- –2006: Maribor

Senior career*
Years	Team	Apps	(Gls)
2005–2006	Maribor	27	(4)
2006–2007	Siena	0	(0)
2007–2009	Maribor	34	(5)
2008–2009	→ Rudar Velenje (loan)	21	(1)
2009–2010	Drava Ptuj	24	(5)
2010–2011	Celje	27	(4)
2011–2012	Dogoše		
2012	UFC Fehring	7	(0)
2013	Aluminij	12	(1)
2013–2017	Dogoše		

International career
2004	Slovenia U17	2	(0)
2006	Slovenia U20	1	(0)
2006–2007	Slovenia U21	8	(2)
2006	Slovenia B	2	(0)
- * Club domestic league appearances and goals

Gorazd Zajc (born 28 December 1987) is a Slovenian retired footballer who played as a forward.
