= Miki Sipiläinen =

Finnish footballer (born 1986)

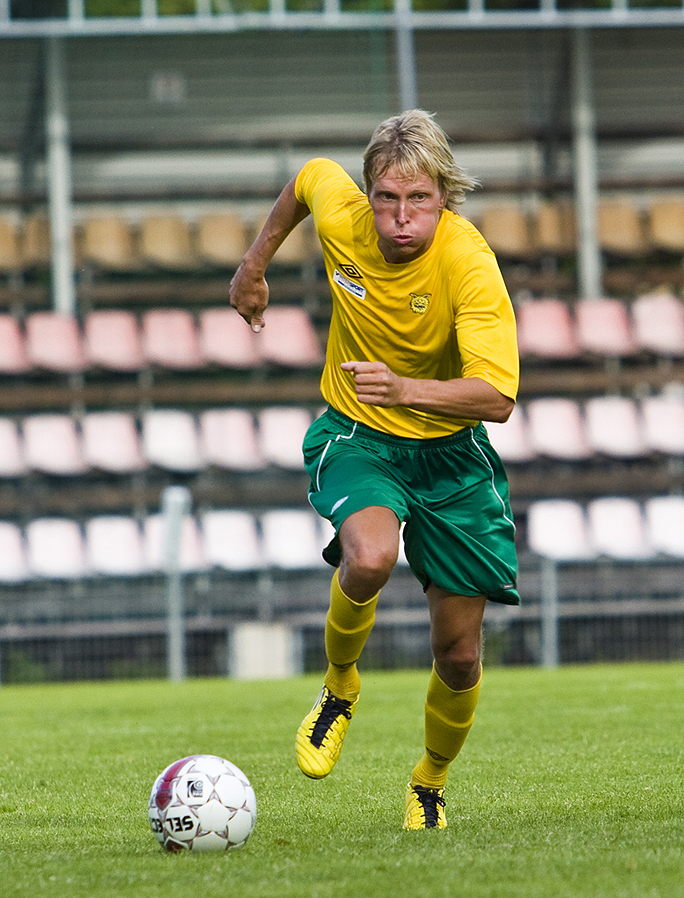
Miki Sipiläinen

Miki Sipiläinen (born 1 August 1986) is a Finnish footballer, who play as a striker in Ilves. He is a former player of Tampere United and also played on loan in PP-70 and AC Oulu. He also represented Finland U21 national team. He won 2 Veikkausligas in 2006 and 2007 with Tampere United.
