= 2015–16 NK Celje season =

NK Celje
2015–16 season
- President: Stevan Đorđević
- Head Coach: Robert Pevnik
- Home stadium: Arena Petrol
- Slovenian League: 5th
- Slovenian Cup: Runners-up
- Europa League: 1st qualifying round
- Top goalscorer: League: Matej Podlogar (5); All: Ivan Firer (8)
- Highest home attendance: 4,100 (vs Maribor)
- Lowest home attendance: 450 (vs Rudar)
- Average home league attendance: 1,179
Home colours	Away colours
- All statistics correct as of 7 June 2016.

The 2015–16 season was Celje's 25th season in the Slovenian PrvaLiga, Slovenian top division, since the league was created in 1991 with Celje as one of the league's founding members. Celje competed in the PrvaLiga, Cup and Europa League. The season for the club began on 2 July 2015 and ended on 25 May 2016.

== Players ==
As of 1 March 2016

Note: Flags indicate national team as defined under FIFA eligibility rules; some limited exceptions apply. Players may hold more than one non-FIFA nationality.

No.	Pos.	Nation	Player
1	GK	SVN	Amel Mujčinović
2	DF	SVN	Žiga Kous
4	MF	SVN	Blaž Vrhovec (captain)
5	DF	SVN	Marko Krajcer
6	DF	SVN	Tilen Klemenčič
8	MF	CRO	Danijel Miškić
9	FW	POR	Érico Sousa
10	MF	SVN	Rudi Požeg Vancaš
11	FW	NGA	Sunny Omoregie
12	GK	SVN	Matic Kotnik
13	MF	SVN	Jon Šporn
14	FW	SVN	Matej Podlogar
15	DF	SVN	Amadej Brecl

No.	Pos.	Nation	Player
16	DF	SVN	Jure Travner
17	FW	SVN	Matic Marcius
19	MF	CRO	Marko Pajač
20	MF	CRO	Mario Brlečić
21	FW	BIH	Adnan Bašić
23	MF	SVN	Nino Pungaršek
24	FW	SRB	Milan Spremo
25	DF	CRO	Lovre Čirjak
27	DF	SVN	Damir Hadžić
28	MF	SVN	Tilen Pečnik
30	DF	SVN	Tadej Vidmajer
31	GK	SVN	Metod Jurhar
32	MF	SVN	Janez Pišek

Source:NK Celje

== Competitions ==
=== Overall ===
Competition	Started round	Final position / round	First match	Last match
PrvaLiga	—	5th	19 July 2015	21 May 2016
Cup	Round of 16	Runners-up	9 September 2015	25 May 2016
UEFA Europa League	First qualifying round	First qualifying round	2 July 2015	9 July 2015

Updated to match played 7 June 2016
Source: Competitions

=== Overview ===
Competition	Record							
Competition	G	W	D	L	GF	GA	GD	Win %
PrvaLiga	36	11	12	13	32	46	−14	30.56
Cup	6	4	2	0	12	5	+7	66.67
Europa League	2	0	0	2	1	4	−3	0.00
Total	44	15	14	15	45	55	−10	34.09

Updated to match played 7 June 2016
Source: Competitions

=== PrvaLiga ===
==== League table ====
Pos	Team	Pld	W	D	L	GF	GA	GD	Pts	Qualification or relegation
3	Domžale	36	14	13	9	46	31	+15	55	Qualification for the Europa League first qualifying round
4	Gorica	36	15	7	14	48	49	−1	52	Qualification for the Europa League first qualifying round
5	Celje	36	11	12	13	32	46	−14	45	
6	Krško	36	10	11	15	24	48	−24	41 (Note: Krško ahead of Rudar Velenje on head-to-head record: Rudar–Krško 1–1, Krško–Rudar 0–0, Rudar–Krško 0–1, Krško–Rudar 1–1.)	
7	Rudar Velenje	36	11	8	17	34	52	−18	41	

Source: Slovenian PrvaLiga (in Slovene), Soccerway
Rules for classification: 1) Points; 2) Head-to-head points; 3) Head-to-head goal difference; 4) Head-to-head goals scored; 5) Goal difference; 6) Goals scored.

==== Results summary ====
Overall								Home						Away					
Pld	W	D	L	GF	GA	GD	Pts	W	D	L	GF	GA	GD	W	D	L	GF	GA	GD
36	11	12	13	32	46	−14	45	5	6	7	17	24	−7	6	6	6	15	22	−7

Last updated: 7 June 2016.
Source: Competitive matches

==== Results by round ====
Round	1	2	3	4	5	6	7	8	9	10	11	12	13	14	15	16	17	18	19	20	21	22	23	24	25	26	27	28	29	30	31	32	33	34	35	36
Ground	A	H	A	H	A	H	A	H	A	H	A	H	A	H	A	H	A	H	A	H	A	H	A	H	A	H	A	H	A	H	A	H	A	H	A	H
Result	L	D	D	L	L	W	L	L	L	D	L	D	D	L	W	L	D	W	D	W	W	D	W	D	D	L	L	L	D	W	W	D	W	L	W	W
Position	8	8	8	10	10	7	10	10	10	10	10	10	10	10	10	10	10	8	8	6	6	6	6	6	6	6	7	9	9	8	8	8	5	7	5	5

Updated to match(es) played on 7 June 2016. Source: Competitive matches
A = Away; H = Home; W = Win; D = Draw; L = Loss

==== Matches ====
Win Draw Loss

19 July 2015 1	Krško	1–0	Celje	Krško
18:30 CEST (UTC+02:00)	Rujovič 39' (pen.); Đukić (yellow card) 56'	Report (in Slovene)	Travner (yellow card) 26' (yellow-red card) 60'; Vrhovec (yellow card) 37' (yellow-red card) 90'; Mujčinović (yellow card) 41'; Ahmedi (yellow card) 61'; Firer (yellow card) 77'	Stadium: Matija Gubec Stadium; Attendance: 1,600; Referee: Matej Jug

26 July 2015 2	Celje	1–1	Krka	Celje
20:15 CEST (UTC+02:00)	Mršić (yellow card) 80'; T.Klemenčič (yellow card) 84'; Vidmajer (red card) 86'; Firer 90+4'	Report (in Slovene)	Kastrevec (yellow card) 51'; Ejup (yellow card) 65'; Marotti (yellow card) 76'; Welbeck 87' (pen.); Collins	Stadium: Arena Petrol; Attendance: 700; Referee: Rade Obrenović

2 August 2015 3	Koper	1–1	Celje	Koper
20:15 CEST (UTC+02:00)	Guberac (yellow card) 10'; Halilović 11'; Rahmanović (yellow card) 26'; Šme (red card) 78'	Report (in Slovene)	Firer 25'; Ahmedi (yellow card) 46'; Soria (yellow card) 63'; Travner (yellow card) 77'	Stadium: Bonifika Stadium; Attendance: 400; Referee: Asmir Sagrković

7 August 2015 4	Celje	2–3	Gorica	Celje
18:30 CEST (UTC+02:00)	Esteves De Sousa 5'; M.Klemenčič (yellow card) 40'; Jogan 74' (o.g.)	Report (in Slovene)	Eleke 19', (yellow card) 53'; Širok (yellow card) 1'; Džuzdanović 69'; Arčon (yellow card) 77'; Nunić 90+2', (yellow card) 90+2'	Stadium: Arena Petrol; Attendance: 600; Referee: Slavko Vinčić

12 August 2015 5	Maribor	1–0	Celje	Maribor
19:15 CEST (UTC+02:00)	Tavares 68', (yellow card) 85'; Filipović (yellow card) 82'	Report (in Slovene)	Pišek (yellow card) 67'; T.Klemenčič (yellow card) 89'	Stadium: Ljudski vrt Attendance: 3,500; Referee: Davor Drečnik

17 August 2015 6	Celje	2–1	Zvarč	Celje
20:15 CEST (UTC+02:00)	Težak (yellow card) 16'; Miškić (yellow card) 35'; Klapan (yellow card) 63'; Vrhovec 64', (yellow card) 74'; Omoregie 85'	Report (in Slovene)	Glavica (yellow card) 15'; Antić (yellow card) 48'; Matjašič (yellow card) 61'; Pihler 62'	Stadium: Arena Petrol; Attendance: 1,050; Referee: Dragoslav Perić

23 August 2015 7	Olimpija	6–0	Celje	Ljubljana
17:45 CEST (UTC+02:00)	Kronaveter 9' 37'; Kelhar 70'; Ricardo Alves 76'; Šporar 78'; Djermanović 89'	Report (in Slovene)	Miškić (yellow card) 52'; Vidmajer (yellow card) 83'; Travner (yellow card) 89'	Stadium: Stožice Stadium; Attendance: 3,500; Referee: Roberto Ponis

29 August 2015 8	Celje	0–3	Domžale	Celje
20:15 CEST (UTC+02:00)	Vidmajer (yellow card) 41'	Report (in Slovene)	Husmani 30' (yellow card) 48'; Vetrih (yellow card) 44'; Šišić 64'; Trajkovski (yellow card) 74'; Dobrovoljc 83'	Stadium: Arena Petrol; Attendance: 900; Referee: Damir Skomina

12 September 2015 9	Rudar	4–0	Celje	Velenje
20:15 CEST (UTC+02:00)	Knezović 43' (yellow card) 68'; Bolha (yellow card) 61'; S.Babić 67' (pen.); Krcić 75'; Kocić 89'	Report (in Slovene)	Firer (yellow card) 29'; Miškić (yellow card) 35'; Ramón Soria (yellow card) 66'	Stadium: Ob Jezeru Stadium; Attendance: 1,100; Referee: Slavko Vinčić

18 September 2015 10	Celje	0–0	Krško	Celje
18:00 CEST (UTC+02:00)	Miškić (yellow card) 58'; Spremo (yellow card) 64'	Report (in Slovene)	Drnovšek (yellow card) 90'	Stadium: Arena Petrol; Attendance: 650; Referee: Dejan Balažič

23 September 2015 11	Krka	1–0	Celje	Novo Mesto
16:00 CEST (UTC+02:00)	Dežmar (yellow card) 48'; Mojstrović (yellow card) 51'; Marotti (yellow card) 76'; Ejup (yellow card) 88'; Perić 90+4' (yellow card) 90+4'	Report (in Slovene)	Ahmedi (yellow card) 5'; Spremo (yellow card) 83'	Stadium: Portoval; Attendance: 300; Referee: Davor Drečnik

26 September 2015 12	Celje	1–1	Koper	Celje
16:00 CEST (UTC+02:00)	Vrhovec (yellow card) 52'; Krajcer (yellow card) 61'; Đurković 90+3', (yellow card) 90+3'	Report (in Slovene)	Štulac 33'; Halilović (yellow card) 38'; Rahmanović (yellow card) 42'	Stadium: Arena Petrol; Attendance: 650; Referee: Roman Glažar

3 October 2015 13	Gorica	1–1	Celje	Nova Gorica
16:00 CEST (UTC+02:00)	Širok (yellow card) 37'; Jogan (red card) 90+2'; Celcer (yellow card) 90+2'; Škarabot 90+5'	Report (in Slovene)	Miškić 6'; Pajač (yellow card) 76'	Stadium: Nova Gorica Sports Park; Attendance: 500; Referee: Rade Obrenović

17 October 2015 14	Celje	1–3	Maribor	Celje
17:45 CEST (UTC+02:00)	Klemenčič (yellow card) 52'; Kous (yellow card) 59'; Đurković 70'	Report (in Slovene)	Viler (yellow card) 28'; Ibraimi 50'; Tavares 53' (pen.); Vršič (yellow card) 67'; Sallalich 71'	Stadium: Arena Petrol; Attendance: 2,500; Referee: Nejc Kajtazović

24 October 2015 15	Zavrč	0–1	Celje	Zavrč
17:00 CET (UTC+01:00)	Rogač (yellow card) 3'; Pihler (yellow card) 8'; Muslimović (yellow card) 54'; Petrović (yellow card) 62'; Zorko (yellow card) 85'	Report (in Slovene)	Miškić (yellow card) 11'; Klemenčič (yellow card) 28'; Pajač 32'; Krajcer (red card) 86'	Stadium: Zavrč Sports Park; Attendance: 300; Referee: Mitja Žganec

31 October 2015 16	Celje	0–4	Olimpija	Celje
15:30 CET (UTC+01:00)	Ramón Soria (yellow card) 29'; Klapan (yellow card) 55'; Osman Ali (yellow card) 66'	Report (in Slovene)	Šporar 15', 22', 45+1', 86'; Henty (yellow card) 54'; Matić (yellow card) 87'	Stadium: Arena Petrol; Attendance: 1,250; Referee: Nejc Kajtazović

8 November 2015 17	Domžale	2–2	Celje	Domžale
15:30 CET (UTC+01:00)	Vuk (yellow card) 65', (goal) 90+3'; Mance 75'; Horić (yellow card) 80'; Zec (yellow card) 84'	Report (in Slovene)	Pajač 13', 77', (yellow card) 84'; Vrhovec (yellow card) 44'	Stadium: Domžale Sports Park; Attendance: 650; Referee: Damir Skomina

22 November 2015 18	Celje	1–0	Rudar	Celje
17:30 CET (UTC+01:00)	Vidmajer (yellow card) 26'; Klemenčič 33'; Firer (yellow card) 51'; Kous (yellow card) 60'; Spremo (yellow card) 70'; Pajač (yellow card) 83'	Report (in Slovene)	Tolimir (yellow card) 59'; Kašnik (yellow card) 79'; Babić (yellow card) 83'	Stadium: Arena Petrol; Attendance: 500; Referee: Matej Jug

28 November 2015 19	Krško	0–0	Celje	Krško
15:30 CET (UTC+01:00)	Čeh (yellow card) 20'; Jurečič (yellow card) 59'	Report (in Slovene)	Kous (yellow card) 32'; Vidmajer (yellow card) 79'	Stadium: Matija Gubec Stadium; Attendance: 550; Referee: Roman Glažar

2 December 2015 20	Celje	1–0	Krka	Celje
16:00 CET (UTC+01:00)	Firer (yellow card) 57'; Vrhovec (yellow card) 75'; Klemenčič 90+2'	Report (in Slovene)	Dangubić (yellow card) 56'; Kostanjšek (yellow card) 65'	Stadium: Arena Petrol; Attendance: 500; Referee: Davor Drečnik

5 December 2015 21	Koper	1–2	Celje	Koper
20:00 CET (UTC+01:00)	Memolla 39'; Posavac (yellow card) 63' (yellow-red card)	Report (in Slovene)	Đurković (yellow card) 6'; Osman Ali (yellow card) 13'; Kous (red card) 38'; Travner (yellow card) 63'; Spremo 69'; Omoregie 72'; Ramón Soria (yellow card) 78'	Stadium: Bonifika Stadium; Attendance: 300; Referee: Slavko Vinčić

12 December 2015 22	Celje	2–2	Gorica	Celje
15:00 CET (UTC+01:00)	Firer 13', 67'; Osman Ali (yellow card) 41'; Érico Sousa (yellow card) 42'	Report (in Slovene)	Širok 48'; Jogan 74'	Stadium: Arena Petrol; Attendance: 650; Referee: Andrej Žnidaršič

27 February 2016 23	Maribor	0–1	Celje	Maribor
16:55 CET (UTC+01:00)	Defendi (yellow card) 44'; Šuler (yellow card) 52'; Bajde (yellow card) 71'; Filipović (yellow card) 90'	Report (in Slovene)	Hadžić (yellow card) 32'; Pajač (red card) 57'; Vrhovec (yellow card) 90'; Kotnik (yellow card) 90'; Spremo 90'	Stadium: Ljudski vrt Attendance: 6,000; Referee: Damir Skomina

5 March 2016 24	Celje	0–0	Zavrč	Celje
15:00 CET (UTC+01:00)	Hadžić (yellow card) 21'	Report (in Slovene)	Rogač (yellow card) 24'; Filipović (yellow card) 47'	Stadium: Arena Petrol; Attendance: 900; Referee: Rade Obrenović

13 March 2016 25	Olimpija	0–0	Celje	Ljubljana
16:55 CET (UTC+01:00)	Mitrović (yellow card) 17'	Report (in Slovene)	Pajač (yellow card) 20'; Vrhovec (yellow card) 29'; Čirjak (yellow card) 81'	Stadium: Stožice Stadium; Attendance: 2,000; Referee: Dragoslav Perič

19 March 2016 26	Celje	1–2	Domžale	Celje
15:00 CET (UTC+01:00)	Érico Sousa 25'; Čirjak (yellow card) 66'; Hadžić (yellow card) 82'	Report (in Slovene)	Črnic 66' (pen.); Balkovec 83'; Vetrih (yellow card) 85'	Stadium: Arena Petrol; Attendance: 900; Referee: Slavko Vinčić

2 April 2016 27	Rudar	2–0	Celje	Velenje
19:00 CEST (UTC+02:00)	Eterović 28' (pen.), 81' (pen.); Tolimir (yellow card) 41'; Džinić (yellow card) 69'	Report (in Slovene)	Krajcer (yellow card) 27'; Miškić (yellow card) 29'; Klemenčič (yellow card) 54'; Vrhovec (red card) 80'; Čirjak (yellow card) 82'	Stadium: Ob Jezeru Stadium; Attendance: 500; Referee: Nejc Kajtazović

6 April 2016 28	Celje	0–1	Krško	Celje
17:00 CEST (UTC+02:00)	Čirjak (red card) 52'; Klemenčič (yellow card) 57'; Esteves de Sousa (yellow card) 64'; Kous (yellow card) 82'	Report (in Slovene)	Đurković 35'; Štefanac (red card) 52'; Pušaver (yellow card) 79'; Hotić (yellow card) 90+4'	Stadium: Arena Petrol; Attendance: 750; Referee: Dejan Balažič

10 April 2016 29	Krka	1–1	Celje	Novo Mesto
16:00 CET (UTC+01:00)	Majcen (yellow card) 35'; Bogdan (yellow card) 52'; Vučkić 73'	Report (in Slovene)	Miškić (yellow card) 57'; Pišek (yellow card) 64'; Pajač 68'	Stadium: Portoval; Attendance: 500; Referee: Damir Skomina

16 April 2016 30	Celje	3–0	Koper	Celje
15:00 CEST (UTC+02:00)	Podlogar 36'; Omoregie 40'; Vrhovec (yellow card) 71'; Pišek 81'	Report (in Slovene)	Jurina (yellow card) 22' (yellow-red card) 27'	Stadium: Arena Petrol; Attendance: 920; Referee: Roman Glažar

23 April 2016 31	Gorica	1–2	Celje	Nova Gorica
19:00 CEST (UTC+02:00)	Kavčič 40'; Curk (yellow card) 49'; Humar (yellow card) 83'	Report (in Slovene)	Podlogar 25', 62'; Kous (yellow card) 85'; Kotnik (yellow card) 90+3'	Stadium: Nova Gorica Sports Park; Attendance: 500; Referee: Mitja Žganec

30 April 2016 32	Celje	0–0	Maribor	Celje
16:55 CEST (UTC+02:00)	Miškić (yellow card) 48'	Report (in Slovene)	Sallalich (yellow card) 45'; Tavares (yellow card) 73'; Filipović (yellow card) 77' (yellow-red card) 90+2'; Novaković (yellow card) 90+2'	Stadium: Arena Petrol; Attendance: 4,100; Referee: Matej Jug

7 May 2016 33	Zavrč	0–1	Celje	Zavrč
19:00 CEST (UTC+02:00)	Jakšić (yellow card) 13'; Tahiraj (yellow card) 75'; Agboyi (yellow card) 81'	Report (in Slovene)	Hadžić 63'; Podlogar (yellow card) 89'	Stadium: Zavrč Sports Park; Attendance: 250; Referee: Bojan Mertik

11 May 2016 34	Celje	1–3	Olimpija	Celje
16:00 CEST (UTC+02:00)	Čirjak 21'; Pajač (yellow card) 89'	Report (in Slovene)	Bajrić 3'; Zajc 20'; Kronaveter 47'; Klinar (yellow card) 66'	Stadium: Arena Petrol; Attendance: 3,200; Referee: Dragoslav Perić

14 May 2016 35	Domžale	0–3	Celje	Domžale
16:55 CEST (UTC+02:00)	Samir Masimov (red card) 47'	Report (in Slovene)	Miškić (yellow card) 38'; Podlogar 44', 45'; Pajač (yellow card) 69'; Vidmajer (yellow card) 74'; Čirjak	Stadium: Domžale Sports Park; Attendance: 400; Referee: Roman Glažar

21 May 2016 36	Celje	1–0	Rudar	Celje
16:55 CEST (UTC+02:00)	Pišek 73'; Bašić (yellow card) 89'	Report (in Slovene)	Grgić (yellow card) 84'	Stadium: Arena Petrol; Attendance: 650; Referee: Slavko Vinčić

=== Cup ===
==== Round of 16 ====
Win Draw Loss

9 September 2015 Round of 16	Mura	0–3	Celje	Murska Sobota
16:00 CEST (UTC+02:00)	Toth (yellow card) 42'; Slana (yellow card) 52'	Report (in Slovene)	Vidmajer (yellow card) 33'; Travner 36'; Poredoš 43' (o.g.); Osman Ali (yellow card) 48'; Firer 54'	Stadium: Fazanerija City Stadium; Attendance: 500; Referee: Roman Glažar

==== Quarter-finals ====
21 October 2015 First leg	Olimpija	2–2	Celje	Ljubljana
17:30 CEST (UTC+02:00)	Mitrović 32', 68'; Henty (yellow card) 64'	Report (in Slovene)	Firer 26'; Pajač 36', (yellow card) 56'; Vidmajer (yellow card) 41'; Soria (yellow card) 56'; Osman Ali (yellow card) 89'	Stadium: Stožice; Attendance: 700; Referee: Andrej Žnidaršič

28 October 2015 Second leg	Celje	3–1 (5–3 agg.)	Olimpija	Celje
17:30 CET (UTC+01:00)	Kous (yellow card) 19' (yellow-red card) 37'; Firer 23', (yellow card) 37'; Spremo 33', (yellow card) 59'; Mitrović 79' (o.g.)	Report (in Slovene)	Henty 88'; Mitrović (yellow card) 83'	Stadium: Arena Petrol; Attendance: Roberto Ponis; Referee: 1,100

==== Semi-finals ====
13 April 2016 First leg	Celje	1–0	Domžale	Celje
18:00 CET (UTC+01:00)	Pajač (yellow card) 42'; Travner (yellow card) 52'; Omoregie 55'; Podlogar (yellow card) 57'; Vidmajer (yellow card) 64'; Blaž Vrhovec (yellow card) 80'	Report (in Slovene)	Črnic (yellow card) 17'	Stadium: Arena Petrol; Attendance: 900; Referee: Andrej Žnidaršič

20 April 2016 Second leg	Domžale	0–1 (0–2 agg.)	Celje	Domžale
17:30 CET (UTC+02:00)	Brachi (red card) 32'; Blažič (yellow card) 66'; Jarović (yellow card) 77'	Report (in Slovene)	Omoregie 6'; Spremo (yellow card) 20'; Miškić (yellow card) 73'	Stadium: Sports Park; Attendance: 800; Referee: Roberto Ponis

==== Final ====
25 May 2016 Final	Celje	2–2 (a.e.t.) (6–7 p)	Maribor	Koper
20:30 CEST (UTC+02:00)	Podlogar 19', 111'; Vrhovec (yellow card) 87'	Report (in Slovene)	Kabha 7'; Vršič 107'	Stadium: Bonifika; Attendance: 2,500; Referee: Matej Jug
	Penalties
	Hadžić (penalty scored); Miškić (penalty scored); Vidmajer (penalty scored); Sousa (penalty missed); Vrhovec (penalty scored); Kous (penalty scored); Travner (penalty scored); Pungaršek (penalty missed)		(penalty missed) Filipović; (penalty scored) Vršič; (penalty scored) Janković; (penalty scored) Tavares; (penalty scored) Novaković; (penalty scored) Kabha; (penalty scored) Viler; (penalty scored) Mertelj

=== UEFA Europa League ===
==== First qualifying round ====
Win Draw Loss

2 July 2015 First leg	Celje (Slovenia)	0–1	(Poland) Śląsk Wrocław	Celje, Slovenia
20:00 CET (UTC+01:00)	Klemenčič (yellow card) 60'	Report	Pich 32'	Stadium: Arena Petrol; Attendance: 4,900; Referee: Enea Jorgji (Albania)

9 July 2015 Second leg	Śląsk Wrocław (Poland)	3–1 (4–1 agg.)	(Slovenia) Celje	Wrocław, Poland
20:00 CET (UTC+01:00)	Ostrowski 46'; Kiełb 56', 90'; Grajciar (yellow card) 62'	Report	Danijel Miškić (yellow card) 65'; Vrhovec (yellow card) 76'; Firer 80'; Ahmedi (yellow card) 84'	Stadium: Stadion Miejski; Attendance: 12,364; Referee: Anatoliy Zhabchenko (Ukraine)

== Statistics ==
=== Squad statistics ===
As of matches played 25 May 2016.

No.	Pos.	Player	Total				PrvaLiga				Cup				Europa League			
No.	Pos.	Player		Goal	Yellow card	Red card		Goal	Yellow card	Red card		Goal	Yellow card	Red card		Goal	Yellow card	Red card
1	GK	(Bosnia and Herzegovina) Amel Mujčinović	4	0	1	0	4	0	1	0	0	0	0	0	0	0	0	0
2	DF	(Slovenia) Žiga Kous	25	0	5	2	21	0	5	1	4	0	0	1	0	0	0	0
4	MF	(Slovenia) Blaž Vrhovec	38	1	10	2	30	1	7	2	6	0	2	0	2	0	1	0
5	DF	(Slovenia) Marko Krajcer	20	0	2	1	18	0	2	1	2	0	0	0	0	0	0	0
6	FW	(Slovenia) Tilen Klemenčič	35	2	8	0	28	2	7	0	5	0	0	0	2	0	1	0
8	MF	(Croatia) Danijel Miškić	32	1	11	0	24	1	9	0	6	0	1	0	2	0	1	0
9	FW	(Portugal) Érico Sousa	35	2	2	0	30	2	2	0	5	0	0	0	0	0	0	0
10	MF	(Slovenia) Rudi Požeg Vancaš	12	0	0	0	11	0	0	0	1	0	0	0	0	0	0	0
11	FW	(Nigeria) Sunny Omoregie	32	5	0	0	26	3	0	0	4	2	0	0	2	0	0	0
12	GK	(Slovenia) Matic Kotnik	33	0	2	0	26	0	2	0	5	0	0	0	2	0	0	0
13	MF	(Slovenia) Jon Šporn	0	0	0	0	0	0	0	0	0	0	0	0	0	0	0	0
14	FW	(Slovenia) Matej Podlogar	16	7	2	0	13	5	1	0	3	2	1	0	0	0	0	0
15	DF	(Slovenia) Amadej Brecl	0	0	0	0	0	0	0	0	0	0	0	0	0	0	0	0
16	DF	(Slovenia) Jure Travner	24	1	5	1	19	0	4	1	5	1	1	0	0	0	0	0
17	FW	(Slovenia) Matic Marcius	2	0	0	0	1	0	0	0	1	0	0	0	0	0	0	0
19	MF	(Croatia) Marko Pajač	10	4	4	0	8	3	3	0	2	1	1	0	0	0	0	0
20	MF	(Croatia) Mario Brlečić	7	0	0	0	7	0	0	0	0	0	0	0	0	0	0	0
21	FW	(Bosnia and Herzegovina) Adnan Bašić	4	0	1	0	4	0	1	0	0	0	0	0	0	0	0	0
23	MF	(Slovenia) Nino Pungaršek	6	0	0	0	4	0	0	0	2	0	0	0	0	0	0	0
24	FW	(Serbia) Milan Spremo	30	3	5	0	25	2	3	0	4	1	2	0	1	0	0	0
25	MF	(Croatia) Lovre Čirjak	11	2	3	1	10	2	3	1	1	0	0	0	0	0	0	0
27	MF	(Slovenia) Damir Hadžić	13	1	3	0	10	1	3	0	3	0	0	0	0	0	0	0
28	MF	(Slovenia) Tilen Pečnik	0	0	0	0	0	0	0	0	0	0	0	0	0	0	0	0
30	DF	(Slovenia) Tadej Vidmajer	35	0	8	1	28	0	5	1	5	0	3	0	2	0	0	0
31	GK	(Slovenia) Metod Jurhar	0	0	0	0	0	0	0	0	0	0	0	0	0	0	0	0
32	MF	(Slovenia) Janez Pišek	14	2	2	0	12	2	2	0	2	0	0	0	0	0	0	0
Players who left the club in Summer/Winter transfer window or on loan
–	FW	(Croatia) Matej Mršić	5	0	2	0	0	0	0	0	2	0	0	0	0	0	0	0
–	MF	(Croatia) Karlo Težak	9	0	1	0	8	0	1	0	0	0	0	0	1	0	0	0
–	FW	(Slovenia) Gregor Bajde	3	0	0	0	1	0	0	0	0	0	0	0	2	0	0	0
–	MF	(Slovenia) Marko Jakolić	4	0	0	0	2	0	0	0	0	0	0	0	2	0	0	0
–	DF	(Slovenia) Marko Klemenčič	3	0	1	0	3	0	1	0	0	0	0	0	0	0	0	0
–	FW	(Slovenia) Ivan Firer	24	8	4	0	19	4	4	0	3	3	0	0	2	1	0	0
–	MF	(Albania) Valon Ahmedi	18	0	4	0	14	0	3	0	2	0	0	0	2	0	1	0
–	GK	(Croatia) Ivan Hosman	8	0	0	0	7	0	0	0	1	0	0	0	0	0	0	0
–	FW	(Austria) Osman Ali	13	0	4	0	11	0	2	0	2	0	2	0	0	0	0	0
–	FW	(Slovenia) Enis Đurković	17	2	2	0	14	2	2	0	3	0	0	0	0	0	0	0
–	DF	(Spain) Ramón Soria	24	0	5	0	19	0	4	0	3	0	1	0	2	0	0	0
–	MF	(Croatia) Mihovil Klapan	21	0	2	0	17	0	2	0	2	0	0	0	2	0	0	0
Own goals			–	3	–	–	–	1	–	–	–	2	–	–	–	0	–	–
TOTALS			–	45	104	9	–	32	85	8	–	12	15	1	–	1	4	0

=== Goalscorers ===
As of matches played 25 May 2016.

Rank	No.	Pos.	Player	PrvaLiga	Cup	Europa League	Total
1	7	FW	(Slovenia) Ivan Firer	4	3	1	8
2	14	FW	(Slovenia) Matej Podlogar	5	2	0	7
3	19	MF	(Croatia) Marko Pajač	4	1	0	5
3	11	FW	(Nigeria) Sunny Omoregie	3	2	0	5
5	24	FW	(Serbia) Milan Spremo	2	1	0	3
6	26	FW	(Slovenia) Enis Đurković	2	0	0	2
6	6	DF	(Slovenia) Tilen Klemenčič	2	0	0	2
6	25	DF	(Croatia) Lovre Čirjak	2	0	0	2
6	9	FW	(Portugal) Érico Sousa	2	0	0	2
6	32	MF	(Slovenia) Janez Pišek	2	0	0	2
11	8	MF	(Croatia) Danijel Miškić	1	0	0	1
11	4	MF	(Slovenia) Blaž Vrhovec	1	0	0	1
11	27	FW	(Slovenia) Damir Hadžić	1	0	0	1
11	16	DF	(Slovenia) Jure Travner	0	1	0	1
Own goals				1	2	0	3
TOTALS				32	12	1	45

== See also ==
- 2015–16 Slovenian PrvaLiga
- 2015–16 Slovenian Football Cup
- 2015–16 UEFA Europa League
