= 2016 Slovenian Football Cup final =

- Event: 2015–16 Slovenian Football Cup
Celje	Maribor
2	2
- Maribor won 7–6 on penalties.
- Date: 25 May 2016
- Venue: Bonifika Stadium, Koper
- Referee: Matej Jug
- Attendance: 2,500

The 2016 Slovenian Football Cup final was the final match of the 2015–16 Slovenian Football Cup to decide the winner of the 25th edition of the Slovenian Football Cup, Slovenia's top knockout tournament. It was played on 25 May 2016 at Bonifika Stadium in Koper and was won by Maribor, who defeated Celje on penalties after the match ended in a 2–2 draw after extra time, winning its ninth cup title.

== Background ==
The final was played between Celje and Maribor, both competing in the Slovenian PrvaLiga. This was the third time that Maribor and Celje met in the cup final, having previously faced each other in 2012 and 2013, with Maribor winning on both occasions. Celje previously competed in eight finals, but won only once, when they defeated Gorica in the 2004–05 edition.

== Road to the final ==
Note: In all results below, the score of the finalist is given first.

Celje				Round	Maribor			
Opponent	Result			Knockout phase	Opponent	Result		
N/A	N/A			First round	N/A	N/A		
Mura	3–0 (A)			Round of 16	Tolmin	3–0 (A)		
Opponent	Agg.	1st leg	2nd leg	Knockout phase	Opponent	Agg.	1st leg	2nd leg
Olimpija	5–3	2–2 (A)	3–1 (H)	Quarter-finals	Rudar Velenje	3–1	0–1 (A)	3–0 (H)
Domžale	2–0	1–0 (H)	1–0 (A)	Semi-finals	Zavrč	6–3	1–2 (A)	5–1 (a.e.t.) (H)

== Match details ==
25 May 2016
20:30 CEST

Celje	2–2 (a.e.t.)	Maribor
Podlogar 19', 111'	Report	Kabha 7'; Vršič 107'
Penalties
Hadžić (penalty scored); Miškić (penalty scored); Vidmajer (penalty scored); Sousa (penalty missed); Vrhovec (penalty scored); Kous (penalty scored); Travner (penalty scored); Pungaršek (penalty missed)	6–7	(penalty missed) Filipović; (penalty scored) Vršič; (penalty scored) Janković; (penalty scored) Tavares; (penalty scored) Novaković; (penalty scored) Kabha; (penalty scored) Viler; (penalty scored) Mertelj

Bonifika, Koper
Attendance: 2,500
Referee: Matej Jug

Celje	Maribor

CELJE:
GK	12	(Slovenia) Matic Kotnik
DF	27	(Slovenia) Damir Hadžić
DF	6	(Slovenia) Tilen Klemenčič	(substituted off) 88'
DF	30	(Slovenia) Tadej Vidmajer
DF	16	(Slovenia) Jure Travner
MF	25	(Croatia) Lovre Čirjak	(substituted off) 109'
MF	4	(Slovenia) Blaž Vrhovec (c)	(yellow card) 87'
MF	8	(Croatia) Danijel Miškić
MF	19	(Croatia) Marko Pajač	(substituted off) 61'
FW	14	(Slovenia) Matej Podlogar
FW	11	(Nigeria) Sunny Omoregie
Substitutes:
GK	1	(Bosnia and Herzegovina) Amel Mujčinović
DF	2	(Slovenia) Žiga Kous	(substituted in) 88'
DF	5	(Slovenia) Marko Krajcer
FW	9	(Portugal) Érico Sousa	(substituted in) 109'
DF	10	(Slovenia) Rudi Požeg Vancaš
MF	23	(Slovenia) Nino Pungaršek	(substituted in) 61'
MF	32	(Slovenia) Janez Pišek
Manager:
(Slovenia) Robert Pevnik

MARIBOR:
GK	33	(Slovenia) Jasmin Handanović
DF	35	(Brazil) Rodrigo Defendi
DF	44	(Slovenia) Denis Šme
DF	28	(Slovenia) Mitja Viler
MF	70	(Slovenia) Aleš Mertelj (c)
MF	5	(Slovenia) Željko Filipović
MF	8	(Israel) Sintayehu Sallalich	(substituted off) 69'
MF	24	(Israel) Marwan Kabha
MF	95	(Montenegro) Marko Janković
FW	14	(France) Jean-Philippe Mendy	(substituted off) 91'
FW	20	(Slovenia) Gregor Bajde	(substituted off) 74'
Substitutes:
GK	1	(Slovenia) Aljaž Cotman
DF	3	(Slovenia) Erik Janža
MF	4	(Slovenia) Marko Šuler
MF	9	(Brazil) Marcos Tavares	(substituted in) 91'
FW	11	(Slovenia) Milivoje Novaković	(substituted in) 74'
FW	22	(Slovenia) Dare Vršič	(substituted in) 69'
MF	39	(Slovenia) Damjan Bohar
Manager:
(Slovenia) Darko Milanič

Assistant referees:
Matej Žunič
Rafael Ajdovec
Fourth official:
Jure Praprotnik
Delegate:
Iztok Gustinčič

2015–16 Slovenian Cup
Winners
Maribor
9th title

== See also ==
- 2015–16 Slovenian Cup
- 2015–16 Slovenian PrvaLiga
