= 2015–16 Slovenian Football Cup =

Tournament details
- Country: Slovenia
- Teams: 28

Final positions
- Champions: Maribor (9th title)
- Runners-up: Celje

Tournament statistics
- Matches played: 32
- Goals scored: 99 (3.09 per match)
- Attendance: 24,785 (775 per match)
- Top goal scorer: Milan Kocić (4 goals)

The 2015–16 Slovenian Football Cup was the 25th season of the Slovenian Football Cup, Slovenia's football knockout competition. Koper were the defending champions, having won their third cup title in the 2014–15 edition.

== Competition format ==
Round	Draw date	Fixtures	Clubs	Format details
First round	23 June 2015	12	24 → 12	18 clubs that have qualified through MNZ Regional Cups + 6 clubs from the 2014–15 PrvaLiga that didn't qualify for UEFA competitions entered at this stage and were drawn into 12 pairs. Teams that have qualified from the same regional cup could not be drawn against each other. The twelve winners were decided over one leg, with extra time and penalties if the score was level after 90 minutes. Lower-level teams were the hosts. If both teams from a pair were from the same level, the home team was determined by the draw.
Round of 16	21 August 2015	8	12+4 → 8	12 first round winners were joined by four 2014–15 PrvaLiga teams that qualified for UEFA competitions, and were drawn into 8 pairs. Teams that have qualified from the same regional cup could not be drawn against each other. The eight winners were decided over one leg, with extra time and penalties if the score was level after 90 minutes. Lower-level teams were the hosts. If both teams from a pair were from the same level, the home team was determined by the draw.
Quarter-finals	18 September 2015	4	8 → 4	8 teams were drawn into 4 pairs. The four winners were decided over two legs on home and away basis with away goals rule being used. In case of a tie, extra time and penalties were used.
Semi-finals	18 January 2016	2	4 → 2	4 teams were drawn into 2 pairs. The two winners were decided over two legs on home and away basis with away goals rule being used. In case of a tie, extra time and penalties were used.
Final	N/A	1	2 → 1	Winner was decided in a single game, played at Bonifika Stadium in Koper. In case of a tie, extra time and penalties were used. The winners have qualified for the 2016–17 UEFA Europa League second qualifying round.

== Qualified teams ==
=== 2014–15 Slovenian PrvaLiga members ===
- Celje
- Domžale
- Gorica
- Koper
- Krka
- Maribor
- Olimpija
- Radomlje
- Rudar Velenje
- Zavrč

=== Qualified through MNZ Regional Cups ===
- 2014–15 MNZ Celje Cup: Šampion and Rogaška
- 2014–15 MNZ Koper Cup: Ankaran Hrvatini and Izola
- 2014–15 MNZG-Kranj Cup: Triglav Kranj and Zarica Kranj
- 2014–15 MNZ Lendava Cup: Odranci and Hotiza
- 2014–15 MNZ Ljubljana Cup: Ivančna Gorica and Ilirija 1911
- 2014–15 MNZ Maribor Cup: Fužinar and Pesnica
- 2014–15 MNZ Murska Sobota Cup: Veržej and Mura
- 2014–15 MNZ Nova Gorica Cup: Brda and Tolmin
- 2014–15 MNZ Ptuj Cup: Drava Ptuj and Stojnci

== Bracket ==
First round
Mura	1
Gorica	0
Ivančna Gorica	6
Odranci	0
Rogaška	0
Olimpija Ljubljana (w/o)	3
Brda	1
Zarica Kranj	4
Ilirija 1911 (a.e.t.)	2
Radomlje	1
Šampion	0
Zavrč	2
Izola	0 (2)
Veržej (pen.)	0 (3)
Triglav Kranj	1
Stojnci	0
Hotiza	1
Drava Ptuj (a.e.t.)	2
Pesnica	0
Rudar Velenje	7
Fužinar	1
Krka	3
Tolmin	2
Ankaran	1

Round of 16
Celje	3
Mura	0
Ivančna Gorica	1
Olimpija Ljubljana	3
Koper	3
Zarica Kranj	0
Ilirija 1911	1
Domžale	3
Zavrč	4
Veržej	0
Triglav Kranj	1 (3)
Drava Ptuj (pen.)	1 (5)
Rudar Velenje	3
Krka	2
Tolmin	0
Maribor	3

Quarter-finals
Celje	2	3	5
Olimpija	2	1	3
Koper	1	1	2
Domžale (a)	0	2	2
Zavrč	1	3	4
Drava Ptuj	1	0	1
Rudar Velenje	1	0	1
Maribor	0	3	3

Semi-finals
Celje	1	1	2
Domžale	0	0	0
Zavrč	2	1	3
Maribor (a.e.t.)	1	5	6

Final
Celje	2 (6)
Maribor (pen.)	2 (7)

== First round ==
Slovenian PrvaLiga clubs Celje, Domžale, Koper and Maribor joined the competition in the second round (round of 16).

19 August 2015	Rogaška	(w.o.)	Olimpija	Rogaška Slatina
16:00 CEST		Report		Stadium: City Stadium

19 August 2015	Hotiza	1–2 (a.e.t.)	Drava Ptuj	Lendava
16:00 CEST	Nikolaj 70'	Report	Tomažič Šeruga 62'; Pauko 96'	Stadium: Hotiza Stadium; Attendance: 500; Referee: Aleksandar Matković

19 August 2015	Ivančna Gorica	6–0	Odranci	Ivančna Gorica
16:00 CEST	Pene 4', 57'; Adamič 22', 37', 79'; Ivanovski 81'	Report		Stadium: Ivančna Gorica Stadium; Attendance: 100; Referee: Mihael Antič

19 August 2015	Fužinar	1–3	Krka	Ravne na Koroškem
16:00 CEST		Report	Perić 25', 49'; Potokar 57'	Stadium: City Stadium; Attendance: 400; Referee: Iztok Gornjak

19 August 2015	Brda	1–4	Zarica	Vipolže
16:00 CEST	Debenjak 23'	Report	Šujica 2'; Križaj 39'; Božičić 76'; Marinković 89'	Stadium: Vipolže Stadium; Attendance: 100; Referee: Boris Tošeski

19 August 2015	Tolmin	2–1	Ankaran	Tolmin
16:00 CEST	Kucalović 54', 74'	Report	Zlatič 84'	Stadium: Brajda Sports Park; Attendance: 250; Referee: Darjan Kovačič

19 August 2015	Mura	1–0	Gorica	Murska Sobota
16:00 CEST	Toth 29'	Report		Stadium: Fazanerija City Stadium; Attendance: 800; Referee: Alen Borošak

19 August 2015	Ilirija 1911	2–1 (a.e.t.)	Radomlje	Radomlje
16:00 CEST	Anželj 30'; Urtelj 112'	Report	Ajdinović 39'	Stadium: Radomlje Sports Park; Attendance: 100; Referee: Tadej Mežnar

19 August 2015	Izola	0–0 (a.e.t.) (2–3 p)	Veržej	Izola
16:00 CEST		Report		Stadium: Izola City Stadium; Attendance: 50; Referee: Asmir Sagrković
	Penalties
	Finkšt (penalty scored); Sajinčič (penalty scored)		(penalty scored) Vinkovič; (penalty scored) Dobaj; (penalty scored) Pelcl

19 August 2015	Pesnica	0–7	Rudar Velenje	Pesnica
16:00 CEST		Report	Kašnik 17'; Kocić 51', 54' (pen.), 61', 81'; Krcić 70', 78'	Stadium: Pesnica Sports Park; Attendance: 250; Referee: Dejan Vivod

19 August 2015	Stojnci	0–1	Triglav	Stojnci
16:00 CEST		Report	Guberac 61'	Stadium: Stojnci Sports Park; Attendance: 110; Referee: Vojko Goričan

19 August 2015	Šampion	0–2	Zavrč	Celje
16:00 CEST		Report	Tuđan 37'; Matjašič 68'	Stadium: Arena Petrol; Attendance: 80; Referee: Štefan Fekonja

Notes

1. The match between Rogaška and Olimpija Ljubljana was not held. The home side as the organizer of the event refused and was unable to meet the high financial demands of the local police to safeguard the event, which they have deemed as "high risk". Olimpija advanced to the next round automatically.
2. The match between Ilirija 1911 and Radomlje was originally scheduled to be played at the home venue of Ilirija 1911. However, because the turf at their stadium was undergoing a renovation, the match was played in Radomlje.

== Round of 16 ==
The draw for the round of 16 was held on 21 August 2015 at the headquarters of the Football Association of Slovenia in Ljubljana. In this phase of the competition, the twelve clubs who advanced from the first round were joined by Celje, Domžale, Koper and Maribor.

9 September 2015	Mura	0–3	Celje	Murska Sobota
16:00 CEST		Report	Travner 36'; Poredoš 43' (o.g.); Firer 54'	Stadium: Fazanerija City Stadium; Attendance: 500; Referee: Roman Glažar

9 September 2015	Drava Ptuj	1–1 (a.e.t.) (5–3 p)	Triglav	Ptuj
16:00 CEST	N. Čeh 35' (pen.)	Report	Poplatnik 59'	Stadium: Ptuj City Stadium; Attendance: 350; Referee: Asmir Sagrković
	Penalties
	A. Čeh (penalty scored); Rešek (penalty scored); Monjac (penalty scored); Pauko (penalty scored) N. Čeh (penalty scored)		(penalty scored) Udovič; (penalty scored) Šturm; (penalty scored) Ljubijankić; (penalty missed) Mlakar

15 September 2015	Zarica	0–3	Koper	Kranj
16:00 CEST		Report	Rahmanović 48'; Posavac 78', 84'	Stadium: Zarica Sports Park; Attendance: 200; Referee: Dejan Balažič

15 September 2015	Ivančna Gorica	1–3	Olimpija	Ivančna Gorica
16:00 CEST	Šajn 64'	Report	Mariotto dos Santos 7'; Henty 66'; Djermanović 81'	Stadium: Ivančna Gorica Stadium; Attendance: 750; Referee: Marko Podgoršek

16 September 2015	Ilirija 1911	1–3	Domžale	Ljubljana
16:00 CEST	Urtelj 72'	Report	Požeg Vancaš 39'; Dobrovoljc 60'; Šišić 73'	Stadium: Ilirija Sports Park; Attendance: 645; Referee: Rade Obrenović

16 September 2015	Veržej	0–4	Zavrč	Veržej
16:00 CEST		Report	Polić 56' (pen.), 87'; Pihler 75'; Glavica 88'	Stadium: Čistina Stadium; Attendance: 200; Referee: Alen Borošak

16 September 2015	Tolmin	0–3	Maribor	Tolmin
16:00 CEST		Report	Volaš 47'; Dervišević 51'; Bajde 73'	Stadium: Brajda Sports Park; Attendance: 1,300; Referee: Dragoslav Perić

16 September 2015	Rudar Velenje	3–2	Krka	Velenje
18:00 CEST	Knezović 37'; Babić 42'; Ihbeisheh 56'	[https://www.nzs.si/tekmovanja?action=tekma&id_tekme=29264	Novinić 4' (pen.); Dangubić 15'	Stadium: Ob Jezeru City Stadium; Attendance: 600; Referee: Miran Bukovec

== Quarter-finals ==
The draw of pairs was held on 18 September 2015 at the headquarters of the Football Association of Slovenia in Ljubljana.

=== First leg ===
21 October 2015	Olimpija	2–2	Celje	Ljubljana
17:30 CEST	Mitrović 32', 68'	Report	Firer 26'; Pajač 36'	Stadium: Stožice; Attendance: 700; Referee: Andrej Žnidaršič

21 October 2015	Zavrč	1–1	Drava Ptuj	Zavrč
18:00 CEST	Batrović 37'	Report	Šalamun 57'	Stadium: Sports Park; Attendance: 600; Referee: Darjan Kovačič

21 October 2015	Rudar Velenje	1–0	Maribor	Velenje
18:00 CEST	Jahić 80'	Report		Stadium: Ob Jezeru; Attendance: 1,100; Referee: Roman Glažar

28 October 2015	Domžale	0–1	Koper	Domžale
18:00 CET		Report	Rahmanović 89'	Stadium: Domžale Sports Park; Attendance: 650; Referee: Davor Drečnik

=== Second leg ===
28 October 2015	Drava Ptuj	0–3 (1–4 agg.)	Zavrč	Ptuj
14:00 CET		Report	Batrović 41', 77'; Riera 68'	Stadium: Ptuj City Stadium; Attendance: 600; Referee: Slavko Vinčić

28 October 2015	Celje	3–1 (5–3 agg.)	Olimpija	Celje
17:30 CET	Firer 23'; Spremo 33'; Mitrović 79' (o.g.)	Report	Henty 88'	Stadium: Arena Petrol; Attendance: Roberto Ponis; Referee: 1,100

28 October 2015	Maribor	3–0 (3–1 agg.)	Rudar Velenje	Maribor
18:00 CET	Kabha 60'; Vršič 76'; Tavares 86'	Report		Stadium: Ljudski vrt Attendance: 3,500; Referee: Mitja Žganec

4 November 2015	Koper	1–2 (2–2a agg.)	Domžale	Koper
18:00 CET	Ivančić 47'	Report	Črnic 3'; Morel 90+2'	Stadium: Bonifika; Attendance: 250; Referee: Nejc Kajtazović

== Semi-finals ==
The draw of pairs was held on 18 January 2016 at the headquarters of the Football Association of Slovenia.

=== First leg ===
13 April 2016	Celje	1–0	Domžale	Celje
18:00 CEST	Omoregie 55'	Report		Stadium: Arena Petrol; Attendance: 900; Referee: Andrej Žnidaršič

14 April 2016	Zavrč	2–1	Maribor	Zavrč
18:00 CEST	Golubar 11'; Matjašič 43'	Report	Bajde 71'	Stadium: Sports Park; Attendance: 1,800; Referee: Dejan Balažič

=== Second leg ===
20 April 2016	Domžale	0–1 (0–2 agg.)	Celje	Domžale
17:30 CEST		Report	Omoregie 6'	Stadium: Sports Park; Attendance: 800; Referee: Roberto Ponis

20 April 2016	Maribor	5–1 (a.e.t.) (6–3 agg.)	Zavrč	Maribor
18:00 CEST	Mendy 30'; Sallalich 72', 91'; Novaković 102', 105'	Report	Handanović 43' (o.g.)	Stadium: Ljudski vrt Attendance: 3,000; Referee: Nejc Kajtazović

== Final ==
25 May 2016
20:30 CEST

Celje	2–2 (a.e.t.)	Maribor
Podlogar 19', 111'	Report	Kabha 7'; Vršič 107'
Penalties
Hadžić (penalty scored); Miškić (penalty scored); Vidmajer (penalty scored); Sousa (penalty missed); Vrhovec (penalty scored); Kous (penalty scored); Travner (penalty scored); Pungaršek (penalty missed)	6–7	(penalty missed) Filipović; (penalty scored) Vršič; (penalty scored) Janković; (penalty scored) Tavares; (penalty scored) Novaković; (penalty scored) Kabha; (penalty scored) Viler; (penalty scored) Mertelj

Bonifika, Koper
Attendance: 2,500
Referee: Matej Jug
