= 2015–16 in Polish football =

Association football season

Football in Poland
- Season: 2015–16

2015–16 in Polish football
- Ekstraklasa champions
- Legia Warsaw
- Polish Cup winner
- Legia Warsaw
- Polish Super Cup winner
- Lech Poznań
- Teams in Europe
- Lech Poznań, Legia Warsaw, Jagiellonia Białystok, Śląsk Wrocław
- Poland national team
- UEFA Euro 2016 qualifying
- UEFA Euro 2016

The 2015–16 season was the 91st season of competitive football in Poland.

== League competitions ==
=== Ekstraklasa ===
==== Regular season ====
Pos	Team	Pld	W	D	L	GF	GA	GD	Pts	Qualification
1	Legia Warsaw	30	17	9	4	58	28	+30	60	Qualification for the championship round
2	Piast Gliwice	30	17	7	6	49	36	+13	58	Qualification for the championship round
3	Pogoń Szczecin	30	10	16	4	36	30	+6	46	Qualification for the championship round
4	Zagłębie Lubin	30	12	9	9	41	37	+4	45 (Note: Head-to-head record: Zagłębie - Cracovia 4–2, Cracovia - Zagłębie 1–2.)	Qualification for the championship round
5	Cracovia	30	12	9	9	57	42	+15	45	Qualification for the championship round
6	Lech Poznań	30	13	4	13	37	38	−1	43	Qualification for the championship round
7	Lechia Gdańsk (Note: Lechia Gdańsk were punished with a deduction of one point for failing with licensing requirements. On 8 April 2016 the punishment was suspended by Polish Court of Arbitration for Sport. On April 11 an appeal against the original decision was withdrawn by the club.)	30	10	9	11	45	37	+8	38 (Note: Head-to-head record: Lechia 7 points, Ruch 5 points, Podbeskidzie 3 points.)	Qualification for the championship round
8	Ruch Chorzów (Note: Ruch Chorzów were punished with a deduction of one point for failing with licensing requirements.)	30	11	6	13	37	46	−9	38	Qualification for the championship round
9	Podbeskidzie Bielsko-Biała	30	9	11	10	37	46	−9	38	Qualification for the relegation round
10	Korona Kielce	30	9	10	11	32	37	−5	37	Qualification for the relegation round
11	Wisła Kraków (Note: Wisła Kraków were punished with a deduction of one point for failing with licensing requirements.)	30	8	13	9	45	35	+10	36	Qualification for the relegation round
12	Jagiellonia Białystok	30	10	5	15	37	54	−17	35	Qualification for the relegation round
13	Śląsk Wrocław	30	8	10	12	28	37	−9	34	Qualification for the relegation round
14	Nieciecza	30	8	9	13	33	43	−10	33	Qualification for the relegation round
15	Górnik Łęczna	30	8	7	15	30	43	−13	31	Qualification for the relegation round
16	Górnik Zabrze (Note: Górnik Zabrze were punished with a deduction of one point for failing with licensing requirements.)	30	4	14	12	33	46	−13	25	Qualification for the relegation round

Source: Ekstraklasa, Soccerway
Rules for classification: 1) Points; 2) Head-to-head points; 3) Head-to-head goal difference; 4) Head-to-head goals scored; 5) Head-to-head away goals scored (only if two teams); 6) Goal difference; 7) Goals scored; 8) Fairplay ranking; 9) Draw. (Note: Head-to-head record is used only after all the matches between the teams in question have been played).

==== Championship round ====
Pos	Team	Pld	W	D	L	GF	GA	GD	Pts	Qualification
1	Legia Warsaw (C)	37	21	10	6	70	32	+38	43	Qualification for the Champions League second qualifying round (Note: Legia Warsaw qualified for the Europa League second qualifying round by winning the 2015–16 Polish Cup. However, since they already qualified for European competition based on their league position, the spot awarded to the cup winners was passed down the league.)
2	Piast Gliwice	37	20	9	8	60	45	+15	40	Qualification for the Europa League second qualifying round
3	Zagłębie Lubin	37	17	9	11	55	42	+13	38	Qualification for the Europa League first qualifying round
4	Cracovia	37	16	10	11	66	50	+16	36	Qualification for the Europa League first qualifying round
5	Lechia Gdańsk (Note: Lechia Gdańsk were punished with a deduction of one point during regular season for failing with licensing requirements. On 8 April 2016 the punishment was suspended by Polish Court of Arbitration for Sport.On 11 April 2016 an appeal against the original decision was withdrawn by the club.)	37	14	10	13	53	44	+9	32	
6	Pogoń Szczecin	37	12	17	8	43	43	0	30	
7	Lech Poznań	37	14	6	17	42	47	−5	27	
8	Ruch Chorzów (Note: Ruch Chorzów were punished with a deduction of one point during regular season for failing with licensing requirements.)	37	11	8	18	40	60	−20	21	

Source: Ekstraklasa, Soccerway
Rules for classification: 1) Points; 2) Points in regular season; 3) Head-to-head points in regular season; 4) Head-to-head goal difference in regular season; 5) Head-to-head goals scored in regular season; 5) Head-to-head away goals scored in regular season (if only two teams); 7) Goal difference; 8) Goals scored; 9) Fairplay ranking; 10) Play-off (only if needed to decide champion, teams for relegation or teams for UEFA competitions).
(C) Champions

==== Relegation round ====
Pos	Team	Pld	W	D	L	GF	GA	GD	Pts	Relegation
9	Wisła Kraków (Note: Wisła Kraków were punished with a deduction of one point during regular season for failing with licensing requirements.)	37	12	15	10	61	45	+16	32	
10	Śląsk Wrocław	37	12	12	13	41	46	−5	31	
11	Jagiellonia Białystok	37	13	6	18	46	62	−16	28	
12	Korona Kielce	37	10	15	12	39	45	−6	27	
13	Nieciecza	37	10	12	15	39	50	−11	26	
14	Górnik Łęczna	37	10	9	18	40	53	−13	24	
15	Górnik Zabrze (Note: Górnik Zabrze were punished with a deduction of one point during regular season for failing with licensing requirements.) (R)	37	6	18	13	38	51	−13	23	Relegation to the I liga
16	Podbeskidzie Bielsko-Biała (R)	37	9	12	16	45	63	−18	20	Relegation to the I liga

Source: Ekstraklasa, Soccerway
Rules for classification: 1) Points; 2) Points in regular season; 3) Head-to-head points in regular season; 4) Head-to-head goal difference in regular season; 5) Head-to-head goals scored in regular season; 5) Head-to-head away goals scored in regular season (if only two teams); 7) Goal difference; 8) Goals scored; 9) Fairplay ranking; 10) Play-off (only if needed to decide champion, teams for relegation or teams for UEFA competitions).
(R) Relegated

== Polish Cup ==
2 May 2015 Polish Cup	Lech Poznań	0 - 1	Legia Warsaw	Stadion Narodowy, Warsaw
16:00 CEST (UTC+2)	Pawłowski (yellow card) 42'; Trałka (yellow card) 56'	Report	Prijović (yellow card) 38', (goal) 69'; Pazdan (yellow card) 90+4'; Jędrzejczyk (yellow card) 90+10'; Guilherme (yellow card) 90+11'	Attendance: 48,563; Referee: Szymon Marciniak (Płock)

== Polish Super Cup ==
10 July 2015 Polish Super Cup	Lech Poznań	3 - 1	Legia Warsaw	INEA Stadion, Poznań
20:15 CEST (UTC+2)	Kędziora 10'; Douglas (yellow card) 31'; Robak (yellow card) 32'; Kamiński 35'; Kádár (yellow card) 58'; Linetty 87'	Report	Rzeźniczak (yellow card) 32'; Żyro 90+5'	Attendance: 40,088; Referee: Mariusz Złotek (Stalowa Wola)

== Polish clubs in Europe ==
=== Lech Poznań ===
2015–16 UEFA Champions League

14 July 2015 Second qualifying round	FK Sarajevo (Bosnia and Herzegovina)	0 - 2	(Poland) Lech Poznań	Asim Ferhatović Hase Stadium, Sarajevo
21:00 CEST (UTC+2)	Barbarić (yellow card) 29'; Duljević (yellow card) 44'; Puzigaća (yellow card) 69'	Report	Hämäläinen 40'; Formella (yellow card) 58'; Thomalla 62'; Kędziora (yellow card) 64'; Jevtić (yellow card) 81'	Attendance: 16,500; Referee: Paolo Valeri (Italy)

22 July 2015 Second qualifying round	Lech Poznań (Poland)	1 - 0 (3 - 0 agg.)	(Bosnia and Herzegovina) FK Sarajevo	INEA Stadion, Poznań
20:45 CEST (UTC+2)	Douglas 6'; Dudka (yellow card) 16'	Report	Alispahić (yellow card) 20'; Tatomirović (yellow card) 40'; Stepanov (yellow card) 59'; Barbarić (yellow card) 90+2'	Attendance: 22,205; Referee: Kevin Clancy (Scotland)

29 July 2015 Third qualifying round	Lech Poznań (Poland)	1 - 3	(Switzerland) FC Basel	INEA Stadion, Poznań
20:45 CEST (UTC+2)	Thomalla 36', (yellow card) 49'; Kędziora (red card) 66'; Linetty (yellow card) 69'; Kádár (yellow card) 82'	Report	Lang 34'; Gashi (penalty missed) 67'; Janko 77'; Callà 90+2'; Xhaka (red card) 90+3'	Attendance: 25,478; Referee: Anthony Taylor (England)

5 August 2015 Third qualifying round	FC Basel (Switzerland)	1 - 0 (4 - 1 agg.)	(Poland) Lech Poznań	St. Jakob-Park, Basel
20:15 CEST (UTC+2)	Suchý (yellow card) 44'; Lang (yellow card) 55'; Callà (yellow card) 80'; Bjarnason 90+1'	Report	Linetty (yellow card) 44'; Kamiński (yellow card) 56'; Douglas (yellow card) 86'	Attendance: 18,196; Referee: Ruddy Buquet (France)

2015–16 UEFA Europa League

20 August 2015 Play-off round	Lech Poznań (Poland)	3 - 0	(Hungary) Videoton FC	INEA Stadion, Poznań
21:00 CEST (UTC+2)	Linetty 11', (yellow card) 62'; Thomalla 57'; Trałka 68'; Burić (yellow card) 77'	Report	Simon (yellow card) 32'; Kovács (yellow card) 90+2'; Ivanovski (yellow card) 90+4'	Attendance: 14,133; Referee: Oliver Drachta (Austria)

27 August 2015 Play-off round	Videoton FC (Hungary)	0 - 1 (0 - 4 agg.)	(Poland) Lech Poznań	Sóstói Stadion, Székesfehérvár
19:00 CEST (UTC+2)	Fejes (yellow card) 49'; Luijckx (yellow card) 56'; Simon (yellow card) 67'	Report	Thomalla (yellow card) 39'; Kędziora 57'; Formella (yellow card) 90'	Attendance: 2,819; Referee: Stefan Johannesson (Sweden)

17 September 2015 Group Stage	Lech Poznań (Poland)	0 - 0	(Portugal) C.F. Os Belenenses	INEA Stadion, Poznań
21:05 CEST (UTC+2)	Dudka (yellow card) 9'; Ceesay (yellow card) 72'; Kádár (yellow card) 87'	Report	Amorim (yellow card) 67'	Attendance: 7,934; Referee: Serhiy Boyko (Ukraine)

1 October 2015 Group Stage	FC Basel (Switzerland)	2 - 0	(Poland) Lech Poznań	St. Jakob-Park, Basel
19:00 CEST (UTC+2)	Samuel (yellow card) 41'; Bjarnason 55'; Embolo 90'	Report	Linetty (yellow card) 22' (yellow-red card) 49'	Attendance: 17,567; Referee: Ognjen Valjić (Bosnia and Herzegovina)

22 October 2015 Group Stage	ACF Fiorentina (Italy)	1 - 2	(Poland) Lech Poznań	Stadio Artemio Franchi, Florence
19:00 CEST (UTC+2)	Rossi 90'; Rebić (red card) 90+1'	Report	Kownacki 65'; Lovrencsics (yellow card) 71'; Gajos 82'; Trałka (yellow card) 90+2'	Attendance: 14,293; Referee: Gediminas Mažeika (Lithuania)

5 November 2015 Group Stage	Lech Poznań (Poland)	0 - 2	(Italy) ACF Fiorentina	INEA Stadion, Poznań
21:05 CET (UTC+1)	Linetty (yellow card) 26'	Report	Iličić 42', 83'	Attendance: 22,343; Referee: Halis Özkahya (Turkey)

26 November 2015 Group Stage	C.F. Os Belenenses (Portugal)	0 - 0	(Poland) Lech Poznań	Estádio do Restelo, Lisbon
19:00 CET (UTC+1)	Ricardo Dias (yellow card) 72'; Dálcio Gomes (yellow card) 85'	Report	Dudka (yellow card) 35'; Linetty (yellow card) 59'	Attendance: 1,987; Referee: (Northern Ireland) Arnold Hunter

10 December 2015 Group Stage	Lech Poznań (Poland)	0 - 1	(Switzerland) FC Basel	INEA Stadion, Poznań
21:05 CET (UTC+1)		Report	Boëtius 50'	Attendance: 10,457; Referee: (Scotland) Bobby Madden

=== Legia Warsaw ===
2015–16 UEFA Europa League

16 July 2015 Second qualifying round	Legia Warsaw (Poland)	1 - 0	(Romania) FC Botoșani	Pepsi Arena, Warsaw
21:00 CEST (UTC+2)	Broź (yellow card) 54'; Rzeźniczak (yellow card) 58'; Guilherme (yellow card) 64'; Duda 77', (yellow card) 78'	Report	Cordoș (yellow card) 20'; Vașvari (yellow card) 60'; Cucu (yellow card) 62'	Attendance: 10,000; Referee: Ante Vučemilović-Šimunović Jr. (Croatia)

23 July 2015 Second qualifying round	FC Botoșani (Romania)	0 - 3 (0 - 4 agg.)	(Poland) Legia Warsaw	Stadionul Municipal, Botoșani
19:00 CEST (UTC+2)	Cordoș (yellow card) 32'; Costin (yellow card) 67'	Report	Guilherme 7'; Nikolić 38' (pen.); Prijović 84'	Attendance: 5,353; Referee: Alexandre Boucaut (Belgium)

30 July 2015 Third qualifying round	FK Kukësi (Albania)	Abandoned (0 - 3 wo.)	(Poland) Legia Warsaw	Qemal Stafa Stadium, Tirana
20:00 CEST (UTC+2)	Flores (yellow card) 21'; Jefferson (yellow card) 26'; Moreira (yellow card) 34', (goal) 49'; Carioca (yellow card) 43'	Report	Duda (yellow card) 18'; Nikolić 29'; Rzeźniczak 51'	Attendance: 4,000; Referee: Stephan Klossner (Switzerland)
Note: Match was abandoned after a Legia Warsaw player was hit in the head by an object thrown from the crowd. Legia was leading 2–1 after 51 minutes.

6 August 2015 Third qualifying round	Legia Warsaw (Poland)	1 - 0 (4 - 0 agg.)	(Albania) FK Kukësi	Pepsi Arena, Warsaw
21:00 CEST (UTC+2)	Bereszyński (yellow card) 28'; Kucharczyk 47'; Furman (yellow card) 53'	Report	Birungueta (yellow card) 58'	Attendance: 11,847; Referee: Tony Chapron (France)

20 August 2015 Play-off round	Zorya Luhansk (Ukraine)	0 - 1	(Poland) Legia Warsaw	Valeriy Lobanovskyi Dynamo Stadium, Kyiv
19:00 CEST (UTC+2)	Chaykovskyi (yellow card) 30'; Ljubenović (yellow card) 57'; Hordiyenko (yellow card) 61'; Sivakov (yellow card) 89'	Report	Guilherme (yellow card) 8'; Kucharczyk 48'; Jodłowiec (yellow card) 71'	Attendance: 8,000; Referee: Anastasios Sidiropoulos (Greece)

27 August 2015 Play-off round	Legia Warsaw (Poland)	3 - 2 (4 - 2 agg.)	(Ukraine) Zorya Luhansk	Pepsi Arena, Warsaw
21:00 CEST (UTC+2)	Pazdan (yellow card) 2'; Brzyski 16'; Guilherme 62'; Rzeźniczak (yellow card) 65'; Duda (yellow card) 90+4', (goal) 90+5' (pen.)	Report	Kamenyuka (yellow card) 37'; Khomchenovskyi 39'; Sivakov (yellow card) 45+2'; Malinovskyi 66'; Budkivskyi (yellow card) 79'; Opanasenko (yellow card) 90+5'	Attendance: 23,163; Referee: Tobias Welz (Germany)

17 September 2015 Group Stage	FC Midtjylland (Denmark)	1 - 0	(Poland) Legia Warsaw	MCH Arena, Herning
19:00 CEST (UTC+2)	Poulsen 60', (yellow card) 85'; Rasmussen (yellow card) 65'	Report	Guilherme (yellow card) 59'; Furman (yellow card) 74' (yellow-red card) 88'; Kuciak (yellow card) 90+4'	Attendance: 6,798; Referee: Hüseyin Göçek (Turkey)

1 October 2015 Group Stage	Legia Warsaw (Poland)	0 - 2	(Italy) S.S.C. Napoli	Pepsi Arena, Warsaw
21:05 CEST (UTC+2)	Rzeźniczak (yellow card) 44'	Report	Mertens 53'; Higuaín 84'	Attendance: 26,357; Referee: Michael Koukoulakis (Greece)

22 October 2015 Group Stage	Legia Warsaw (Poland)	1 - 1	(Belgium) Club Brugge KV	Pepsi Arena, Warsaw
21:05 CEST (UTC+2)	Rzeźniczak (yellow card) 50'; Kucharczyk 51'	Report	De Fauw 39'	Attendance: 16,320; Referee: Harald Lechner (Austria)

5 November 2015 Group Stage	Club Brugge KV (Belgium)	1 - 0	(Poland) Legia Warsaw	Jan Breydel Stadium, Bruges
19:00 CET (UTC+1)	Meunier 38'; De Bock (yellow card) 72'	Report	Saganowski (yellow card) 27'; Pazdan (yellow card) 77'; Guilherme (yellow card) 83'	Attendance: 16,349; Referee: Marijo Strahonja (Croatia)

26 November 2015 Group Stage	Legia Warsaw (Poland)	1 - 0	(Denmark) FC Midtjylland	Pepsi Arena, Warsaw
21:05 CET (UTC+1)	Prijović 35'; Duda (yellow card) 46'; Żyro (yellow card) 87'	Report	Rømer (yellow card) 39'; Sparv (yellow card) 45'; J. Poulsen (yellow card) 84'	Attendance: 9,568; Referee: Andre Marriner (England)

10 December 2015 Group Stage	S.S.C. Napoli (Italy)	5 - 2	(Poland) Legia Warsaw	Stadio San Paolo, Naples
19:00 CET (UTC+1)	Chalobah 32', (yellow card) 89'; Insigne 39'; Strinić (yellow card) 55'; Callejón 57'; Mertens 65', 90+1'	Report	Vranješ 62'; Prijović 90+2'	Attendance: 7,922; Referee: Aleksandar Stavrev (FYR Macedonia)

=== Jagiellonia Białystok ===
2015–16 UEFA Europa League

2 July 2015 First qualifying round	FK Kruoja Pakruojis (Lithuania)	0 – 1	(Poland) Jagiellonia Białystok	Savivaldybė Stadium, Šiauliai
17:00 CEST (UTC+2)	Skroblas (yellow card) 15'; Crişan (yellow card) 27'; Navikas (yellow card) 53'; Diarra (yellow card) 89'	Report	Grzyb (yellow card) 24' (yellow-red card) 82'; Madera (yellow card) 27'; Tarasovs (yellow card) 88'; Świderski 90+3'	Attendance: 2,354; Referee: João Capela (Portugal)

9 July 2015 First qualifying round	Jagiellonia Białystok (Poland)	8 – 0 (9–0 agg.)	(Lithuania) FK Kruoja Pakruojis	Stadion Miejski, Białystok
20:30 CEST (UTC+2)	Gajos 3'; Świderski 8'; Tuszyński 18', 45+1', 49' (penalty missed) 49'; Frankowski 64', 75', 80', (yellow card) 69'	Report	Salamanavičius (yellow card) 34'; Tarasenko (yellow card) 36'	Attendance: 13,724; Referee: Domagoj Vučkov (Croatia)

16 July 2015 Second qualifying round	Jagiellonia Białystok (Poland)	0 - 0	(Cyprus) AC Omonia	Stadion Miejski, Białystok
20:30 CEST (UTC+2)	Tomasik (yellow card) 77'	Report	Economides (yellow card) 43'; Fofana (yellow card) 66'; Runje (yellow card) 76'; Ramos (yellow card) 90+1'	Attendance: 16,067; Referee: Bojan Pandžić (Sweden)

23 July 2015 Second qualifying round	AC Omonia (Cyprus)	1 - 0 (1 - 0 agg.)	(Poland) Jagiellonia Białystok	GSP Stadium, Nicosia
18:00 CEST (UTC+2)	Sheridan 8', (yellow card) 36'; Bebê (yellow card) 35'; Ramos (yellow card) 75'	Report	Romanchuk (yellow card) 50'; Sekulski (yellow card) 73'	Attendance: 18,109; Referee: Danilo Grujić (Serbia)

=== Śląsk Wrocław ===
2015–16 UEFA Europa League

2 July 2015 First qualifying round	NK Celje (Slovenia)	0 – 1	(Poland) Śląsk Wrocław	Arena Petrol, Celje
20:00 CEST (UTC+2)	Klemenčič (yellow card) 60'	Report	Pich 32'; Grajciar (yellow card) 65'; Ostrowski (yellow card) 90+1'	Attendance: 4,900; Referee: Enea Jorgji (Albania)

9 July 2015 First qualifying round	Śląsk Wrocław (Poland)	3 – 1 (4–1 agg.)	(Slovenia) NK Celje	Stadion Miejski, Wrocław
20:00 CEST (UTC+2)	Ostrowski 46'; Kiełb 56', 90'; Grajciar (yellow card) 62'	Report	Miškić (yellow card) 65'; Vrhovec (yellow card) 76'; Firer 80'; Ahmedi (yellow card) 84'	Attendance: 12,364; Referee: Anatoliy Zhabchenko (Ukraine)

16 July 2015 Second qualifying round	Śląsk Wrocław (Poland)	0 - 0	(Sweden) IFK Göteborg	Stadion Miejski, Wrocław
20:30 CEST (UTC+2)	Kiełb (yellow card) 34'	Report		Attendance: 16,978; Referee: Jesús Gil Manzano (Spain)

23 July 2015 Second qualifying round	IFK Göteborg (Sweden)	2 - 0 (2 - 0 agg.)	(Poland) Śląsk Wrocław	Gamla Ullevi, Gothenburg
19:00 CEST (UTC+2)	Engvall 55'; Boman 59'	Report	Zieliński (yellow card) 30'; Paraíba (yellow card) 62'; Kokoszka (yellow card) 62'; Gecov (yellow card) 90+3'	Attendance: 10,823; Referee: Serdar Gözübüyük (Netherlands)

== National teams ==
=== Poland national team ===
4 September 2015 UEFA Euro 2016 qualifying	Germany	3 - 1	Poland	Commerzbank-Arena, Frankfurt
20:45 CEST (UTC+2)	Müller 12'; Götze 19', 82'; Kroos (yellow card) 61'; Schweinsteiger (yellow card) 79'	Report	Rybus (yellow card) 8'; Lewandowski 37'; Grosicki (yellow card) 67'	Attendance: 48,500; Referee: Nicola Rizzoli (Italy)

7 September 2015 UEFA Euro 2016 qualifying	Poland	8 - 1	Gibraltar	National Stadium, Warsaw
20:45 CEST (UTC+2)	Grosicki 8', 15'; Lewandowski 18', 29'; Milik 56', 72'; Błaszczykowski 59' (pen.); Kapustka 73'	Report	Gosling 87'	Attendance: 27,763; Referee: Gediminas Mažeika (Lithuania)

8 October 2015 UEFA Euro 2016 qualifying	Scotland	2 - 2	Poland	Hampden Park, Glasgow
20:45 CEST (UTC+2)	Ritche 45'; Brown (yellow card) 56'; S. Fletcher 62'; Hutton (yellow card) 68'	Report	Lewandowski 3', 90+4'; Rybus (yellow card) 22'; Krychowiak (yellow card) 84'	Attendance: 49,359; Referee: Viktor Kassai (Hungary)

11 October 2015 UEFA Euro 2016 qualifying	Poland	2 - 1	Republic of Ireland	National Stadium, Warsaw
20:45 CEST (UTC+2)	Krychowiak 13'; Lewandowski 42'; Glik (yellow card) 74'; Peszko (yellow card) 87'	Report	Walters 16' (pen.), (yellow card) 90+5'; O'Shea (yellow card) 19' (yellow-red card) 90+2'; Whelan (yellow card) 45+1'	Attendance: 57,497; Referee: Cüneyt Çakır (Turkey)

13 November 2015 Friendly	Poland	4 - 2	Iceland	National Stadium, Warsaw
20:45 CET (UTC+1)	Grosicki 52'; Zieliński (yellow card) 57'; Kapustka 67'; Lewandowski 76' 79'	Report	Sigurðsson 4'; Finnbogason 69'	Attendance: 56,207; Referee: Padraig Sutton (Republic of Ireland)

17 November 2015 Friendly	Poland	3 - 1	Czech Republic	Stadion Miejski, Wrocław
20:45 CET (UTC+1)	Milik 3'; Jodłowiec 12'; Jędrzejczyk (yellow card) 40'; Grosicki 70' (yellow card) 71'	Report	Krejčí 41'; Suchý (yellow card) 85'	Attendance: 40,793; Referee: Andó-Szabó Sándor (Hungary)

23 March 2016 Friendly	Poland	1 - 0	Serbia	INEA Stadion, Poznań
20:45 CET (UTC+1)	Błaszczykowski 28'	Report		Attendance: 38,271; Referee: Alexander Harkam (Austria)

26 March 2016 Friendly	Poland	5 - 0	Finland	Stadion Miejski, Wrocław
17:30 CET (UTC+1)	Grosicki 18', 85'; Wszołek 20', 66'; Starzyński 32'; Glik (yellow card) 43'	Report	Arkivuo (yellow card) 81'	Attendance: 42,068; Referee: Hiroyuki Kimura (Japan)

1 June 2016 Friendly	Poland	1 - 2	Netherlands	Stadion Energa, Gdańsk
20:45 CEST (UTC+2)	Jędrzejczyk 60'; Lewandowski (yellow card) 63'	Report	Janssen 33'; Wijnaldum (yellow card) 63', (goal) 76'	Attendance: 40,392; Referee: Miroslav Zelinka (Czech Republic)

6 June 2016 Friendly	Poland	0 - 0	Lithuania	Stadion Miejski, Kraków
18:00 CEST (UTC+2)	Krychowiak (yellow card) 79'	Report	Baravykas (yellow card) 2'; Freidgeimas (yellow card) 61'; Norvilas (yellow card) 79'; Vaitkūnas (yellow card) 83'	Attendance: 33,027; Referee: Filip Glova (Slovakia)

12 June 2016 UEFA Euro 2016	Northern Ireland	0 - 1	Poland	Allianz Riviera, Nice
18:00 CEST (UTC+2)	Cathcart (yellow card) 69'	Report	Milik 51'; Kapustka (yellow card) 65'; Piszczek (yellow card) 89'	Attendance: 35,624; Referee: Ovidiu Haţegan (Romania)

16 June 2016 UEFA Euro 2016	Germany	0 - 0	Poland	Stade de France, Saint-Denis
21:00 CEST (UTC+2)	Khedira (yellow card) 3'; Özil (yellow card) 34'; Boateng (yellow card) 67'	Report	Mączyński (yellow card) 45'; Grosicki (yellow card) 55'; Peszko (yellow card) 90+3'	Attendance: 73,648; Referee: Björn Kuipers (Netherlands)

21 June 2016 UEFA Euro 2016	Ukraine	0 - 1	Poland	Stade Vélodrome, Marseille
18:00 CEST (UTC+2)	Rotan (yellow card) 25'; Kucher (yellow card) 38'	Report	Błaszczykowski 54'; Kapustka (yellow card) 60'	Attendance: 58,874; Referee: Svein Oddvar Moen (Norway)

25 June 2016 UEFA Euro 2016	Switzerland	1 - 1 (a.e.t.) (4–5 p)	Poland	Stade Geoffroy-Guichard, Saint-Étienne
15:00 CEST (UTC+2)	Schär (yellow card) 55'; Shaqiri 82'; Djourou (yellow card) 117'	Report	Błaszczykowski 39'; Jędrzejczyk (yellow card) 58'; Pazdan (yellow card) 111'	Attendance: 38,842; Referee: Mark Clattenburg (England)
	Penalties
	Lichtsteiner (penalty scored); Xhaka (penalty missed); Shaqiri (penalty scored); Schär (penalty scored); Rodríguez (penalty scored)		(penalty scored) Lewandowski; (penalty scored) Milik; (penalty scored) Glik; (penalty scored) Błaszczykowski; (penalty scored) Krychowiak

30 June 2016 UEFA Euro 2016	Portugal	1 - 1 (a.e.t.) (5–3 p)	Poland	Stade Vélodrome, Marseille
21:00 CEST (UTC+2)	Sanches 33'; A. Silva (yellow card) 70'; W. Carvalho (yellow card) 90+2'	Report	Lewandowski 2'; Jędrzejczyk (yellow card) 42'; Glik (yellow card) 66'; Kapustka (yellow card) 89'	Attendance: 62,940; Referee: Felix Brych (Germany)
	Penalties
	Ronaldo (penalty scored); Sanches (penalty scored); Moutinho (penalty scored); Nani (penalty scored); Quaresma (penalty scored)		(penalty scored) Lewandowski; (penalty scored) Milik; (penalty scored) Glik; (penalty missed) Błaszczykowski
