= Čirjak =

Čirjak is a surname. Notable people with the surname include:

- Frane Čirjak (born 1995), Croatian footballer
- Lovre Čirjak (born 1991), Croatian footballer
