= Metod Jurhar =

Slovenian footballer (born 1997)

Personal information
- Date of birth: 7 December 1997 (age 28)
- Place of birth: Celje, Slovenia
- Height: 1.89 m (6 ft 2 in)
- Position: Goalkeeper

Team information
- Current team: Voluntari
- Number: 31

Youth career
- 2010–2016: Celje

Senior career*
Years	Team	Apps	(Gls)
2015–2024	Celje	62	(0)
2024–2026	Koper	63	(0)
2026–	Voluntari	14	(0)

International career
2018	Slovenia U21	1	(0)
- * Club domestic league appearances and goals as of 2 November 2026

Metod Jurhar (born 7 December 1997) is a Slovenian professional footballer who plays as a goalkeeper for Liga I club Voluntari.

== Honours ==
Celje

- Slovenian PrvaLiga: 2019–20, 2023–24
- Slovenian Cup runner-up: 2015–16, 2020–21

Koper

- Slovenian Cup runner-up: 2024–25
