= 2015–16 Slovenian PrvaLiga =

Slovenian PrvaLiga
- Season: 2015–16
- Dates: 17 July 2015 – 21 May 2016
- Champions: Olimpija (1st title)
- Relegated: Zavrč; Krka
- Champions League: Olimpija
- Europa League: Maribor (cup winners); Domžale; Gorica
- Matches: 180
- Goals: 439 (2.44 per match)
- Best player: Rok Kronaveter
- Top goalscorer: Andraž Šporar, Jean-Philippe Mendy & Rok Kronaveter (all 17 goals)
- Biggest home win: Maribor 7–1 Rudar
- Biggest away win: Koper 0–5 Maribor
- Highest scoring: Maribor 7–1 Rudar
- Longest winning run: 7 matches Gorica; Olimpija
- Longest unbeaten run: 12 matches Maribor
- Longest winless run: 13 matches Krško
- Longest losing run: 5 matches Krka
- Highest attendance: 14,000; Olimpija 1–2 Maribor
- Lowest attendance: 100; Krka 1–5 Rudar
- Total attendance: 282,490
- Average attendance: 1,569

The 2015–16 Slovenian PrvaLiga (also known as the Prva liga Telekom Slovenije for sponsorship reasons) was the 25th edition of the Slovenian PrvaLiga since its establishment in 1991. Also known by the abbreviation 1. SNL, PrvaLiga was contested by the top ten clubs in Slovenia, for the title of national champions. The season began on 17 July 2015 and ended on 21 May 2016.

Maribor was the defending champion, having won its 13th league title the previous season.

== Competition format ==
Each team played 36 matches (18 home and 18 away). Teams played four matches against each other (2 home and 2 away).

== Teams ==
A total of ten teams contested the league, including nine from the 2014–15 Slovenian PrvaLiga and one promoted from the 2014–15 Slovenian Second League.

Krško won direct promotion as champions of the Slovenian Second League. They replaced Radomlje in the top division, who finished at the bottom of the PrvaLiga table, ending their first season in the top division.

This was the first season for Krško in the Slovenian PrvaLiga.

=== Stadiums and locations ===
Location of teams in the 2015–16 Slovenian PrvaLiga

Team	Location	Stadium	Capacity^{1}
Celje	Celje	Arena Petrol	13,059
Domžale	Domžale	Sports Park	3,100
Gorica	Nova Gorica	Sports Park	3,100
Koper	Koper	Bonifika	4,047
Krka	Novo Mesto	Portoval	500
Krško	Krško	Matija Gubec Stadium	1,470
Maribor	Maribor	Ljudski vrt	12,702
Olimpija Ljubljana	Ljubljana	Stožice	16,038
Rudar Velenje	Velenje	Ob Jezeru	1,864
Zavrč	Zavrč	Sports Park	962

^{1}Seating capacity only. Some stadiums (e.g. Krka, Krško, Rudar, Zavrč) also have standing areas.

=== Personnel and kits ===
Team	Head coach	Captain	Kit manufacturer	Shirt sponsor
Celje	(Slovenia) Robert Pevnik	(Slovenia) Blaž Vrhovec	Legea	Cinkarna
Domžale	(Slovenia) Luka Elsner	(Slovenia) Darko Zec	Taxa	Tark
Gorica	(Slovenia) Miran Srebrnič	(Slovenia) Alen Jogan	Erreà	None
Koper	(Serbia) Milan Obradović	(Slovenia) Leo Štulac	Nike	Port of Koper
Krka	(Slovenia) Miloš Kostić	(Slovenia) Danijel Dežmar	Hummel	Krka
Krško	(Slovenia) Tomaž Petrovič	(Slovenia) Miha Drnovšek	Erima	GEN, Kostak
Maribor	(Slovenia) Darko Milanič	(Brazil) Marcos Tavares	Adidas	Zavarovalnica Maribor, Nova KBM, Radio City
Olimpija Ljubljana	(Italy) Rodolfo Vanoli	(Slovenia) Darijan Matić	Nike	Telekom Slovenije
Rudar Velenje	(Slovenia) Ramiz Smajlović	(Croatia) Ivan Knezović	Joma	Premogovnik Velenje
Zavrč	(Serbia) Slavko Matić	(Croatia) Lovro Cvek	Zeus Sport	RM VUK Holding, Tilia

== League table ==
=== Standings ===
Pos	Team	Pld	W	D	L	GF	GA	GD	Pts	Qualification or relegation
1	Olimpija Ljubljana (C)	36	22	8	6	75	25	+50	74	Qualification for the Champions League second qualifying round
2	Maribor	36	19	11	6	78	37	+41	68	Qualification for the Europa League second qualifying round (Note: Maribor qualified for the Europa League second qualifying round by winning the 2015–16 Slovenian Cup.)
3	Domžale	36	14	13	9	46	31	+15	55	Qualification for the Europa League first qualifying round
4	Gorica	36	15	7	14	48	49	−1	52	Qualification for the Europa League first qualifying round
5	Celje	36	11	12	13	32	46	−14	45	
6	Krško	36	10	11	15	24	48	−24	41 (Note: Krško ahead of Rudar Velenje on head-to-head record: Rudar–Krško 1–1, Krško–Rudar 0–0, Rudar–Krško 0–1, Krško–Rudar 1–1.)	
7	Rudar Velenje	36	11	8	17	34	52	−18	41	
8	Koper	36	11	7	18	40	54	−14	40 (Note: Koper ahead of Zavrč on head-to-head record: Zavrč–Koper 1–0, Koper–Zavrč 3–1, Zavrč–Koper 1–3, Koper–Zavrč 1–0.)	
9	Zavrč (R)	36	9	13	14	32	41	−9	40	Qualification for the relegation play-offs
10	Krka (R)	36	8	10	18	30	56	−26	34	Relegation to Slovenian Second League

Source: Slovenian PrvaLiga (in Slovene), Soccerway
Rules for classification: 1) Points; 2) Head-to-head points; 3) Head-to-head goal difference; 4) Head-to-head goals scored; 5) Goal difference; 6) Goals scored.
(C) Champions; (R) Relegated

=== Positions by round ===
Team ╲ Round	1	2	3	4	5	6	7	8	9	10	11	12	13	14	15	16	17	18	19	20	21	22	23	24	25	26	27	28	29	30	31	32	33	34	35	36
Olimpija	1	2	6	3	2	2	2	2	1	1	1	1	1	1	1	1	1	1	1	1	1	1	1	1	1	1	1	1	1	1	1	1	1	1	1	1
Maribor	5	4	1	2	3	3	3	4	4	4	5	5	3	4	4	2	2	2	2	2	2	2	2	2	2	2	2	2	2	2	2	2	2	2	2	2
Domžale	2	5	2	5	4	4	4	3	3	3	3	3	4	3	2	3	3	3	3	3	3	3	3	3	3	3	3	3	3	3	3	3	3	3	3	3
Gorica	10	6	3	1	1	1	1	1	2	2	2	2	2	2	3	4	4	4	4	4	4	4	4	4	4	4	4	4	4	4	4	4	4	4	4	4
Celje	8	8	8	10	10	7	10	10	10	10	10	10	10	10	9	10	10	9	9	9	9	6	6	6	6	6	7	9	9	8	8	8	5	7	5	5
Krško	4	1	4	6	6	6	7	8	9	8	9	9	9	9	10	9	9	10	10	10	10	10	10	9	10	10	9	7	7	7	7	7	6	8	8	6
Rudar	9	10	10	9	8	8	8	9	6	6	6	6	6	6	6	6	6	7	7	7	7	9	9	8	9	9	8	6	6	6	6	6	8	5	6	7
Koper	7	9	9	8	9	10	5	7	8	9	8	8	8	8	8	8	8	6	6	6	6	7	8	10	7	7	6	8	8	9	9	9	9	9	9	8
Zavrč	6	7	5	7	7	9	9	5	5	5	4	4	5	5	5	5	5	5	5	5	5	5	5	5	5	5	5	5	5	5	5	5	7	6	7	9
Krka	3	3	7	4	5	5	6	6	7	7	7	7	7	7	7	7	7	8	8	8	8	8	7	7	8	8	10	10	10	10	10	10	10	10	10	10

Leader
Second
Third
Relegation play-off
Relegation to 2. SNL

Source: PrvaLiga official website
Notes: Round 22 was the final round before the winter break

== Results ==
=== First half of the season ===
Home \ Away	CEL	DOM	GOR	KOP	KRK	KRŠ	MAR	OLI	RUD	ZAV
Celje		0–3	2–3	1–1	1–1	0–0	1–3	0–4	1–0	2–1
Domžale	2–2		2–3	1–0	3–0	2–0	0–1	1–1	0–2	0–1
Gorica	1–1	0–1		1–2	2–0	3–1	1–4	0–3	2–1	3–0
Koper	1–1	2–3	1–3		0–0	4–0	2–1	1–2	1–1	3–1
Krka	1–0	0–4	1–2	2–4		2–0	0–2	1–3	0–0	1–1
Krško	1–0	1–1	1–0	1–0	0–0		1–3	0–2	0–0	0–1
Maribor	1–0	1–1	4–2	4–0	2–2	4–1		0–3	7–1	1–1
Olimpija	6–0	0–2	4–1	4–1	3–1	5–0	2–2		5–0	0–2
Rudar	4–0	0–0	1–0	1–0	0–1	1–1	0–0	1–3		1–3
Zavrč	0–1	0–0	1–2	1–0	0–1	1–1	2–1	1–1	3–2	

Source: Slovenian PrvaLiga (in Slovene)
Legend: Blue = home team win; Yellow = draw; Red = away team win.

=== Second half of the season ===
Home \ Away	CEL	DOM	GOR	KOP	KRK	KRŠ	MAR	OLI	RUD	ZAV
Celje		1–2	2–2	3–0	1–0	0–1	0–0	1–3	1–0	0–0
Domžale	0–3		1–1	1–1	1–1	2–3	0–0	0–1	4–0	0–0
Gorica	1–2	0–2		0–1	1–0	1–0	0–2	1–1	1–0	2–2
Koper	1–2	0–2	1–1		2–3	0–1	0–5	1–2	0–1	1–0
Krka	1–1	3–1	1–0	0–1		0–0	1–3	0–2	1–5	2–0
Krško	0–0	0–0	0–2	0–1	3–0		1–3	2–1	1–1	0–1
Maribor	0–1	2–1	2–3	2–2	2–1	6–0		0–0	2–3	3–3
Olimpija	0–0	0–0	0–2	2–0	3–0	0–1	1–2		5–0	1–1
Rudar	2–0	1–2	1–0	0–2	1–1	0–1	0–3	0–1		1–0
Zavrč	0–1	0–1	1–1	1–3	2–1	1–1	0–0	1–2	0–2	

Source: Slovenian PrvaLiga (in Slovene)
Legend: Blue = home team win; Yellow = draw; Red = away team win.

== PrvaLiga play-off ==
The two-legged play-off between the ninth-placed team from the PrvaLiga and the second-placed team from the 2. SNL was played. The winner earned a place in the 2016–17 Slovenian PrvaLiga.

29 May 2016
20:00 CEST

Zavrč	3–2	Aluminij
Pihler 42'; Kokorović 44'; Tišma 86'	Report	Bizjak 14' (pen.); Kurež 24'

Sports Park, Zavrč
Attendance: 600
Referee: Roberto Ponis
2 June 2016
17:00 CEST

Aluminij	1–1	Zavrč
Bizjak 56' (pen.)	Report	Pihler 58'

Sports Park, Kidričevo
Attendance: 1,000
Referee: Dragoslav Perić

Zavrč won the play-off fixture against Aluminij 4–3 on aggregate, but the club was unsuccessful in obtaining a licence to play in the top division for the next season, due to financial reasons.

After their decision, the Football Association of Slovenia invited Aluminij to join the top division, with the side from Kidričevo accepting the offer.

== Season statistics ==
=== Top goalscorers ===
Rank	Player	Team	Goals
1	(Slovenia) Rok Kronaveter	Olimpija	17
1	(Slovenia) Andraž Šporar	Olimpija	17
1	(France) Jean-Philippe Mendy	Maribor	17
4	(Nigeria) Blessing Eleke	Gorica/Olimpija	15
5	(Slovenia) Gregor Bajde	Maribor	13
6	(Brazil) Marcos Tavares	Maribor	12
7	(Croatia) Antonio Mance	Domžale	11
8	(North Macedonia) Agim Ibraimi	Maribor	10
9	(Nigeria) Ezekiel Henty	Olimpija	8
9	(Slovenia) Jaka Štromajer	Koper	8

Source:PrvaLiga official website

=== Hat-tricks ===
Player	For	Against	Result	Date	Round	Reference
(Slovenia) Andraž Šporar	Olimpija	Rudar	5–0 (H)	30 August 2015	8	Report
(Slovenia) Andraž Šporar^{4}	Olimpija	Celje	4–0 (A)	31 October 2015	16	Report
(Slovenia) Gregor Bajde	Maribor	Krško	6–0 (H)	5 December 2015	21	Report
(France) Jean-Philippe Mendy	Maribor	Krško	6–0 (H)	5 December 2015	21	Report

^{4} Player scored four goals

=== Discipline ===
Pos	Team	Yellow card	Second yellow card	Red card
1	Rudar	101	6	9
2	Koper	99	5	7
3	Celje	85	3	8
4	Krka	89	2	6
5	Zavrč	100	2	2
6	Olimpija	81	4	4
7	Maribor	76	3	5
8	Krško	77	1	4
9	Gorica	74	3	4
10	Domžale	74	2	3
Totals		856	31	52

Source:PrvaLiga official website

=== Attendances ===
Pos	Team	Total	High	Low	Average	Change
1	Olimpija	78,300	14,000	1,000	4,350	+201.7%
2	Maribor	76,660	12,160	2,000	4,259	−3.3%
3	Krško	23,250	2,400	550	1,292	+250.1%^{^{1}}
4	Celje	21,220	4,100	450	1,179	+4.6%
5	Rudar	18,500	3,000	350	1,028	+81.0%
6	Domžale	18,050	2,600	300	1,003	+8.8%
7	Koper	13,650	2,700	200	758	+56.9%
8	Gorica	13,160	1,800	300	731	+132.1%
9	Zavrč	11,750	2,200	250	653	+31.7%
10	Krka	7,950	800	100	442	−1.8%
	League total	282,490	14,000	100	1,569	+45.1%

Source: PrvaLiga official website

Note^{1}: Krško played in the Slovenian Second League the previous season.

== Awards ==
=== Annual awards ===
PrvaLiga Player of the Season

- Rok Kronaveter

PrvaLiga Goalkeeper of the Season

- Nejc Vidmar

PrvaLiga U23 Player of the Season

- Miha Zajc

=== PrvaLiga Team of the Season ===

Slovenian PrvaLiga Team of the 2015–16 season – SPINS XI.

Player	Team	Position	Ref.
(Slovenia) Nejc Vidmar	Domžale/Olimpija	Goalkeeper	
(Croatia) Toni Datković	Zavrč/Koper	Defender	
(Slovenia) Matic Fink	Olimpija	Defender	
(Slovenia) Nemanja Mitrović	Olimpija	Defender	
(Slovenia) Nejc Skubic	Domžale	Defender	
(Slovenia) Rok Kronaveter	Olimpija	Midfielder	
(Slovenia) Blaž Vrhovec	Celje	Midfielder	
(Slovenia) Miha Zajc	Olimpija	Midfielder	
(Nigeria) Blessing Eleke	Gorica/Olimpija	Forward	
(France) Jean-Philippe Mendy	Maribor	Forward	
(Slovenia) Andraž Šporar	Olimpija	Forward	

== See also ==
- 2015 Slovenian Supercup
- 2015–16 Slovenian Football Cup
- 2016 Slovenian Football Cup Final
- 2015–16 Slovenian Second League
