= Ramón Soria =

Spanish footballer

Personal information
- Full name: Ramón Soria Alonso
- Date of birth: 7 March 1989 (age 37)
- Place of birth: Alicante, Spain
- Height: 1.80 m (5 ft 11 in)
- Position: Defender

Youth career
- 2004–2009: Villarreal

Senior career*
| Years | Team | Apps | (Gls) |
| 2009–2011 | Mallorca B | 52 | (2) |
| 2011–2012 | Albacete | 1 | (0) |
| 2012–2013 | Jove Español | 17 | |
| 2013 | Teruel | 16 | (0) |
| 2013 | Gjøvik FF | 5 | (1) |
| 2014 | Ottawa Fury | 20 | (0) |
| 2015 | Mariehamn | 0 | (0) |
| 2015 | Celje | 34 | (0) |
| 2016–2017 | Puerto Rico FC | 52 | (1) |
| 2018 | Formentera | 15 | (1) |
| 2019–2021 | FC Edmonton | 56 | (2) |

International career
| 2004–2005 | Spain U16 | 4 | (0) |
| 2006 | Spain U17 | 9 | (0) |
- * Club domestic league appearances and goals as of November 6, 2021

Ramón Soria Alonso (born 7 March 1989) is a Spanish professional footballer who plays as a defender.

== Club career ==
=== Early career ===
Soria spent five seasons developing with Villarreal, which included one year with their reserve team for the 2008-2009 season. Soria would then join RCD Mallorca B from 2009 to 2011 where he also served as captain. Over the next three seasons Soria would play for three different Spanish clubs - Albacete Balompié, FC Jove Español and Teruel, before spending a short time in Norway with Gjøvik FF.

=== Ottawa Fury ===
Soria signed with NASL club Ottawa Fury FC as their first defender in the club's history on December 13, 2013.

=== Celje ===
In February 2016, Soria signed with Slovenian PrvaLiga club NK Celje.

=== Puerto Rico FC ===
In March 2016, Soria signed for NASL expansion side Puerto Rico.

=== Formentera ===
On 30 January 2018, Soria returned to Spain to sign with Segunda B side SD Formentera until the end of the season. He made 15 league appearances for Formentera and scored one goal.

=== FC Edmonton ===
On 31 January 2019, Soria signed with Canadian Premier League side FC Edmonton. On February 9, 2022, the club announced that Soria and all but two other players would not be returning for the 2022 season.

== International career ==
Soria has represented Spain at the U16, and U17 levels, including at the 2006 UEFA European Under-17 Football Championship in Luxembourg where Spain finished third.

== Career statistics ==
As of 25 August 2021

Club statistics
| Club | Season | League | | | National Cup (Note: Includes the Copa del Rey, Slovenian Football Cup, Copa Luis Villarejo and Canadian Championship.) | | League Cup (Note: Includes the Finnish League Cup.) | | Continental (Note: Includes the UEFA Europa League.) | | Other | | Total | |
| Club | Season | Division | Apps | Goals | Apps | Goals | Apps | Goals | Apps | Goals | Apps | Goals | Apps | Goals |
|---|---|---|---|---|---|---|---|---|---|---|---|---|---|---|
| Mallorca B | 2009–10 | Segunda División B | 25 | 0 | — | | — | | — | | 0 | 0 | 25 | 0 |
| Mallorca B | 2010–11 | Segunda División B | 27 | 2 | — | | — | | — | | 0 | 0 | 27 | 2 |
| Mallorca B | Total | | 52 | 2 | 0 | 0 | 0 | 0 | 0 | 0 | 0 | 0 | 52 | 2 |
| Albacete | 2011–12 | Segunda División B | 1 | 0 | 1 | 0 | — | | — | | 0 | 0 | 2 | 0 |
| Teruel | 2012–13 | Segunda División B | 16 | 0 | — | | — | | — | | 0 | 0 | 16 | 0 |
| Ottawa Fury | 2014 | NASL | 19 | 0 | 1 | 0 | — | | — | | 0 | 0 | 20 | 0 |
| Mariehamn | 2015 | Veikkausliiga | 0 | 0 | 0 | 0 | 2 | 0 | — | | 0 | 0 | 2 | 0 |
| Celje | 2014–15 | Slovenian PrvaLiga | 15 | 0 | 3 | 0 | — | | — | | 0 | 0 | 18 | 0 |
| Celje | 2015–16 | Slovenian PrvaLiga | 19 | 0 | 3 | 0 | — | | 2 | 0 | 0 | 0 | 24 | 0 |
| Celje | Total | | 34 | 0 | 6 | 0 | 0 | 0 | 2 | 0 | 0 | 0 | 42 | 0 |
| Puerto Rico FC | 2016 | NASL | 21 | 0 | ? | 0 | — | | — | | 0 | 0 | 21 | 0 |
| Puerto Rico FC | 2017 | NASL | 31 | 1 | — | | — | | — | | 0 | 0 | 31 | 1 |
| Puerto Rico FC | Total | | 52 | 1 | 0 | 0 | 0 | 0 | 0 | 0 | 0 | 0 | 52 | 1 |
| Formentera | 2017–18 | Segunda División B | 15 | 1 | — | | — | | — | | 0 | 0 | 15 | 1 |
| FC Edmonton | 2019 | Canadian Premier League | 23 | 1 | 2 | 0 | — | | — | | 0 | 0 | 25 | 1 |
| FC Edmonton | 2020 | Canadian Premier League | 7 | 0 | — | | — | | — | | 0 | 0 | 7 | 0 |
| FC Edmonton | 2021 | Canadian Premier League | 13 | 1 | 1 | 0 | — | | — | | 0 | 0 | 14 | 1 |
| FC Edmonton | Total | | 43 | 2 | 3 | 0 | 0 | 0 | 0 | 0 | 0 | 0 | 46 | 2 |
| Career total | | | 232 | 6 | 11 | 0 | 2 | 0 | 2 | 0 | 0 | 0 | 247 | 6 |
