= Mihovil Klapan =

Croatian footballer

Personal information
- Full name: Mihovil Jeronim Klapan
- Date of birth: 27 March 1995 (age 31)
- Place of birth: Zadar, Croatia
- Height: 1.77 m (5 ft 10 in)
- Position: Midfielder

Team information
- Current team: HNK Zadar
- Number: 20

Youth career
- 2009–2013: Rijeka
- 2013–2014: → Spezia (loan)

Senior career*
| Years | Team | Apps | (Gls) |
| 2014–2015 | Rijeka B | 18 | (1) |
| 2015–2016 | Celje | 17 | (0) |
| 2016–2017 | Opatija | 10 | (2) |
| 2017 | Ankaran | 16 | (3) |
| 2018 | Aluminij Kidričevo | 7 | (0) |
| 2018–2019 | Senica | 37 | (0) |
| 2020 | Lokomotiv Plovdiv | 6 | (0) |
| 2020 | UTA Arad | 2 | (0) |
| 2021–2022 | Opatija | 30 | (0) |
| 2022–2023 | Halubjan | 29 | (15) |
| 2024–2025 | Lokomotiva Rijeka | 37 | (9) |
| 2025– | HNK Zadar | 6 | (0) |

International career^{‡}
| 2010 | Croatia U15 | 4 | (1) |
| 2011 | Croatia U16 | 4 | (0) |
| 2011 | Croatia U17 | 2 | (0) |
| 2014 | Croatia U19 | 3 | (0) |
| 2015 | Croatia U20 | 2 | (1) |
| 2015 | Croatia U21 | 1 | (0) |
- * Club domestic league appearances and goals as of 20 October 2025 ‡ National team caps and goals as of 20 October 2025

Mihovil Klapan (born 27 March 1995) is a Croatian professional footballer who plays as a midfielder for HNK Zadar.

== Club career ==
=== FK Senica ===
Klapan made his professional Fortuna Liga debut for Senica against AS Trenčín on February 23, 2019.

== Honours ==
=== Club ===
Lokomotiv Plovdiv

- Bulgarian Cup: 2019–20
