= Matic Kotnik =

Slovenian footballer (born 1990)

Personal information
- Date of birth: 23 July 1990 (age 36)
- Place of birth: Slovenj Gradec, SFR Yugoslavia
- Height: 1.90 m (6 ft 3 in)
- Position: Goalkeeper

Youth career
- –2009: Dravograd

Senior career*
Years	Team	Apps	(Gls)
–2009	Dravograd		
2009–2017	Celje	157	(0)
2011	→ Dravinja (loan)	12	(0)
2017–2020	Panionios	67	(0)
2020–2021	Brescia	0	(0)
2021–2023	Volos	12	(0)
2023–2024	Ionikos	4	(0)
2025	SV Pischelsdorf	20	(0)

International career
2006–2007	Slovenia U17	4	(0)
2007	Slovenia U18	1	(0)
2009	Slovenia U19	1	(0)
2008	Slovenia U20	2	(0)
2017	Slovenia B	1	(0)
- * Club domestic league appearances and goals

Matic Kotnik (born 23 July 1990) is a Slovenian former professional footballer who played as a goalkeeper.

== Club career ==
=== Panionios ===
On 11 June 2017, Kotnik moved abroad for the first time in his career, joining Panionios of the Super League Greece on a two-year contract.

== International career ==
In August 2016, Kotnik was named in Slovenia's squad for a 2018 FIFA World Cup qualifier against Lithuania.

== Career statistics ==
=== Club ===
As of 27 July 2021

Appearances and goals by club, season and competition
Club	Season	League			National cup		Continental		Total	
Club	Season	Division	Apps	Goals	Apps	Goals	Apps	Goals	Apps	Goals
Celje	2009–10	Slovenian PrvaLiga	0	0	0	0	—		0	0
Celje	2011–12	Slovenian PrvaLiga	13	0	4	0	—		17	0
Celje	2012–13	Slovenian PrvaLiga	36	0	6	0	2	0	44	0
Celje	2013–14	Slovenian PrvaLiga	29	0	3	0	2	0	34	0
Celje	2014–15	Slovenian PrvaLiga	32	0	6	0	—		38	0
Celje	2015–16	Slovenian PrvaLiga	26	0	5	0	2	0	33	0
Celje	2016–17	Slovenian PrvaLiga	21	0	1	0	—		22	0
Celje	Total		157	0	25	0	6	0	188	0
Dravinja (loan)	2010–11	Slovenian Second League	12	0	—		—		12	0
Panionios	2017–18	Super League Greece	27	0	6	0	4	0	37	0
Panionios	2018–19	Super League Greece	18	0	3	0	—		21	0
Panionios	2019–20	Super League Greece	22	0	3	0	—		25	0
Panionios	Total		67	0	12	0	4	0	83	0
Brescia	2020–21	Serie B	0	0	1	0	—		1	0
Career total			236	0	38	0	10	0	284	0
