= Nemanja Mitrović (footballer) =

Slovenian footballer (born 1992)

Personal information
- Date of birth: 15 October 1992 (age 34)
- Place of birth: Ljubljana, Slovenia
- Height: 1.93 m (6 ft 4 in)
- Position: Central defender

Youth career
- –2001: Kamnik
- 2001–2002: Jarše
- 2002–2008: Domžale
- 2008: Koper
- 2009–2010: Internazionale
- 2010: → Sassuolo (loan)
- 2010–2012: Bologna

Senior career*
Years	Team	Apps	(Gls)
2013–2017	Olimpija Ljubljana	111	(5)
2017–2019	Jagiellonia Białystok	57	(2)
2019–2024	Maribor	91	(5)
2024	SV Wildon	9	(0)
Total		268	(12)

International career
2008	Slovenia U17 (Note: Official competitive UEFA matches only.)	3	(0)
2010	Slovenia U19	3	(0)
2011–2013	Slovenia U20	4	(0)
2010–2014	Slovenia U21	24	(1)
2018–2020	Slovenia	5	(2)
- * Club domestic league appearances and goals

Nemanja Mitrović (born 15 October 1992) is a Slovenian former professional footballer who played as a defender.

== International career ==
Mitrović made his debut for Slovenia in a friendly match against Belarus on 27 March 2018.

== Career statistics ==
=== International ===
Appearances and goals by national team and year
National team	Year	Apps	Goals
Slovenia	2018	3	0
Slovenia	2019	0	0
Slovenia	2020	2	2
Total		5	2

Scores and results list Slovenia's goal tally first, score column indicates score after each Mitrović goal.

List of international goals scored by Nemanja Mitrović
No.	Date	Venue	Cap	Opponent	Score	Result	Competition
1	7 October 2020	Stožice Stadium, Ljubljana, Slovenia	4	San Marino	1–0	4–0	Friendly
2	7 October 2020	Stožice Stadium, Ljubljana, Slovenia	4	San Marino	3–0	4–0	Friendly

== Honours ==
Olimpija Ljubljana

- Slovenian PrvaLiga: 2015–16

Maribor

- Slovenian PrvaLiga: 2021–22
