= Krzysztof Ostrowski =

Polish footballer

Personal information
- Full name: Krzysztof Ostrowski
- Date of birth: 3 May 1982 (age 44)
- Place of birth: Wrocław, Poland
- Height: 1.78 m (5 ft 10 in)
- Position: Midfielder

Youth career
- Panda Wrocław

Senior career*
| Years | Team | Apps | (Gls) |
- Parasol Wrocław
| 2002 | Inkopax Wrocław | | |
| 2002–2003 | Śląsk Wrocław | 29 | (1) |
| 2003–2004 | Zagłębie Lubin | 10 | (0) |
| 2004–2008 | Śląsk Wrocław | 63 | (4) |
| 2009 | Legia Warsaw | 5 | (0) |
| 2009–2012 | Widzew Łódź | 60 | (4) |
| 2013–2016 | Śląsk Wrocław | 80 | (2) |
| 2013–2016 | Śląsk Wrocław II | 13 | (2) |
| 2016–2018 | Polonia Trzebnica | | |
| 2018–2019 | Orzeł Prusice | | |
- * Club domestic league appearances and goals

Krzystof Ostrowski (born 3 May 1982) is a Polish former professional footballer who played as a midfielder. He made 135 appearances and scored 4 goals in Ekstraklasa. In 2010, he opened a rehab center in Wrocław.

== Honours ==
Śląsk Wrocław

- Ekstraklasa Cup: 2008–09

Widzew Łódź

- I liga: 2009–10
