= Janez Pišek (footballer, born 1998) =

Slovenian footballer (born 1998)

Personal information
- Date of birth: 4 May 1998 (age 28)
- Place of birth: Slovenia
- Height: 1.79 m (5 ft 10 in)
- Position: Midfielder

Team information
- Current team: Ilirija 1911

Youth career
- –2016: Celje

Senior career*
Years	Team	Apps	(Gls)
2015–2019	Celje	110	(5)
2019–2023	Domžale	96	(5)
2023–2024	Borac Banja Luka	14	(0)
2024	Aluminij	15	(0)
2024	Rudar Velenje	10	(0)
2025–	Ilirija 1911	0	(0)

International career
2014–2015	Slovenia U17 (Note: Official competitive UEFA matches only.)	6	(0)
2015–2016	Slovenia U19	6	(0)
2017–2020	Slovenia U21	24	(3)
- * Club domestic league appearances and goals as of 16 January 2025

Janez Pišek (born 4 May 1998) is a Slovenian footballer who plays as a midfielder for Ilirija 1911.

== Career ==
Pišek made his professional debut in the Slovenian PrvaLiga for Celje on 23 May 2015 in a game against Gorica.
