= Marko Krajcer =

Slovenian footballer

Personal information
- Full name: Marko Krajcer
- Date of birth: 6 June 1985 (age 41)
- Place of birth: SFR Yugoslavia
- Position: Defender

Team information
- Current team: FC Oberes Feistritztal
- Number: 27

Youth career
- –2003: Dravograd

Senior career*
Years	Team	Apps	(Gls)
2003–2004	Dravograd	14	(0)
2005	Izola	14	(0)
2005	ATSV Wolfsberg		
2006	Dravograd	13	(2)
2006–2011	Aluminij	111	(6)
2011–2016	Celje	145	(5)
2017–2018	Krško	53	(0)
2018–2023	SC Weiz	100	(2)
2023-	FC Oberes Feistritztal	6	(0)

International career
2004	Slovenia U19	1	(0)
2005	Slovenia U20	1	(0)
- * Club domestic league appearances and goals as of 8 December 2023

Marko Krajcer (born 6 June 1985) is a Slovenian footballer who plays for FC Oberes Feistritztal.
