= Jure Travner =

Slovenian footballer

Personal information
- Date of birth: 28 September 1985 (age 41)
- Place of birth: Celje, SFR Yugoslavia
- Height: 1.80 m (5 ft 11 in)
- Position: Defender

Team information
- Current team: ASKÖ Jabing

Youth career
- –2004: Celje

Senior career*
Years	Team	Apps	(Gls)
2004–2009	Celje	116	(1)
2004–2005	→ Šmartno (loan)	23	(1)
2005	→ Dravograd (loan)	6	(0)
2009–2011	Watford	0	(0)
2010–2011	→ St Mirren (loan)	22	(1)
2011	St Mirren	15	(0)
2011	Ludogorets Razgrad	3	(0)
2012–2013	Mura 05	42	(2)
2013–2015	Baku	42	(3)
2015	Reading	1	(0)
2015–2020	Celje	120	(1)
2020	Dravograd	1	(0)
2020–2021	Mura	12	(0)
2021–2024	SV Wildon		
2024–	ASKÖ Jabing		

International career
2006	Slovenia U21	4	(0)
- * Club domestic league appearances and goals as of 3 February 2024

Jure Travner (born 28 September 1985) is a Slovenian professional footballer who plays as a defender for Austrian lower-league club ASKÖ Jabing.

== Career ==
Travner began his professional playing career with Celje in 2004.

On 18 July 2009, Travner signed for Watford for an undisclosed fee on a two-year deal. Although considered a member of the first team squad, Travner failed to make an appearance for Watford in 2009–10.

It was announced on 9 July 2010 that Travner would join St Mirren on a year-long loan. He scored his first St Mirren goal in the final minute against Aberdeen on 30 October to give the Saints a 2–1 win. Travner was released by Watford in January 2011, but then signed a contract to the end of the 2010–11 season with St Mirren.

Travner was out of contract with St Mirren when he was signed by Bulgarian A PFG side Ludogorets Razgrad on 19 August 2011. On 31 October he made his league debut for Ludogorets, in their 3–0 win over Montana.

In July 2013 Travner agreed to join Azerbaijan Premier League side FK Baku.

Near the end of 2014, Travner joined English Championship side Reading on trial, playing in several behind closed doors friendlies for the club. On 22 January 2015, he signed for Reading on a short team contract until the end of the 2014–15 season, making his debut on 14 March in a 4–1 defeat to former club Watford. Travner was released by Reading on 21 May 2015, and was then re-signed by Celje in July 2015.

== Career statistics ==
As of match played 15 July 2020

Appearances and goals by club, season and competition
Club	Season	League			National cup		League cup		Continental		Total	
Club	Season	Division	Apps	Goals	Apps	Goals	Apps	Goals	Apps	Goals	Apps	Goals
Celje	2004–05	Slovenian PrvaLiga	3	0	0	0	—		0	0	3	0
Celje	2005–06	Slovenian PrvaLiga	25	0	5	0	—		0	0	30	0
Celje	2006–07	Slovenian PrvaLiga	30	0	4	0	—		—		34	0
Celje	2007–08	Slovenian PrvaLiga	29	0	2	1	—		—		31	1
Celje	2008–09	Slovenian PrvaLiga	29	1	1	0	—		—		30	1
Celje	Total		116	1	12	1	0	0	0	0	128	2
Watford	2009–10	Championship	0	0	0	0	0	0	—		0	0
St Mirren (loan)	2010–11	Scottish Premier League	22	1	1	0	1	0	—		24	1
St Mirren	2010–11	Scottish Premier League	15	0	3	0	0	0	—		18	0
Ludogorets Razgrad	2011–12	A Group	3	0	1	0	—		—		4	0
Mura 05	2011–12	Slovenian PrvaLiga	14	1	0	0	—		—		14	1
Mura 05	2012–13	Slovenian PrvaLiga	28	1	1	0	—		2	1	31	2
Mura 05	Total		42	2	1	0	0	0	2	1	45	3
Baku	2013–14	Azerbaijan Premier League	35	2	3	0	—		—		38	2
Baku	2014–15	Azerbaijan Premier League	7	1	0	0	—		—		7	1
Baku	Total		42	3	3	0	0	0	0	0	45	3
Reading	2014–15	Championship	1	0	0	0	0	0	—		1	0
Celje	2015–16	Slovenian PrvaLiga	19	0	5	1	—		0	0	24	1
Celje	2016–17	Slovenian PrvaLiga	34	1	2	0	—		—		36	1
Celje	2017–18	Slovenian PrvaLiga	25	0	4	0	—		—		29	0
Celje	2018–19	Slovenian PrvaLiga	27	0	2	0	—		—		29	0
Celje	2019–20	Slovenian PrvaLiga	15	0	4	0	—		—		19	0
Celje	Total		120	1	17	1	0	0	0	0	137	2
Career total			361	8	38	2	1	0	2	1	402	11

== Honours ==
Celje

- Slovenian PrvaLiga: 2019–20

Mura

- Slovenian PrvaLiga: 2020–21
