= Danijel Miškić =

Croatian footballer (born 1993)

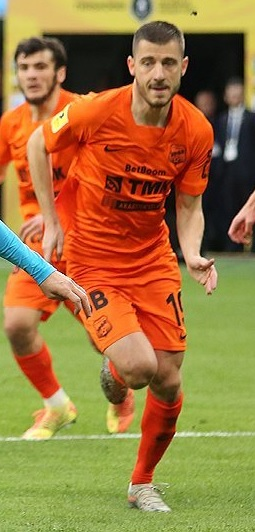
- Miškić playing for Ural Yekaterinburg in 2022

Personal information
- Full name: Danijel Miškić
- Date of birth: 11 October 1993 (age 33)
- Place of birth: Novo Mesto, Slovenia
- Height: 1.82 m (6 ft 0 in)
- Position: Central midfielder

Youth career
- –2005: Croatia Sesvete
- 2005–2011: Dinamo Zagreb

Senior career*
Years	Team	Apps	(Gls)
2011–2013	Dinamo Zagreb	0	(0)
2011–2013	→ Radnik Sesvete (loan)	39	(0)
2013	Lokomotiva Zagreb	1	(0)
2014–2016	Celje	68	(8)
2016–2018	Olimpija Ljubljana	45	(7)
2018–2020	Orenburg	49	(1)
2020–2025	Ural Yekaterinburg	119	(11)

International career
2008	Croatia U15	4	(0)
2009–2010	Croatia U17	11	(1)
2011–2012	Croatia U19	13	(1)
2012–2013	Croatia U20	5	(0)
- * Club domestic league appearances and goals as of 24 May 2025

Danijel Miškić (born 11 October 1993) is a Croatian football central midfielder.

== Career ==
Miškić started off in the Croatia Sesvete academy before moving to the Dinamo Zagreb academy where he spent 6 season moving up the ranks. A youth international, he was then sent to the Druga HNL subsidiary Radnik Sesvete on loan in 2011, remaining there for two seasons. Moving to Lokomotiva in the summer on 2013, he made his Prva HNL debut on 22 July 2013, coming in the 70th minute of the 2–1 away win against Osijek for Filip Mrzljak. That, however, remained his only cap for the team, and he moved the following winter to Celje in the Slovenian PrvaLiga. On 25 July 2016, he joined Olimpija Ljubljana and signed a three-year contract.

On 7 August 2018, Olimpija announced the transfer of Miškić to the Russian Premier League club Orenburg.

On 13 August 2020, he moved to another Russian Premier League club Ural Yekaterinburg. On 31 May 2023, Miškić extended his contract with Ural.

== Career statistics ==
As of match played 14 July 2024

Appearances and goals by club, season and competition
Club	Season	League			Cup		Continental		Other		Total	
Club	Season	Division	Apps	Goals	Apps	Goals	Apps	Goals	Apps	Goals	Apps	Goals
Radnik Sesvete	2011–12	2. HNL	14	0	—		—		—		14	0
Radnik Sesvete	2012–13	2. HNL	25	0	1	0	—		—		26	0
Radnik Sesvete	Total		39	0	1	0	0	0	—		40	0
Lokomotiva Zagreb	2013–14	1. HNL	1	0	—		1 (Note: Appearance in the UEFA Europa League)	0	—		2	0
Celje	2013–14	PrvaLiga	12	0	—		—		—		12	0
Celje	2014–15	PrvaLiga	30	7	6	1	—		—		36	8
Celje	2015–16	PrvaLiga	24	1	6	0	2	0	—		32	1
Celje	2016–17	PrvaLiga	2	0	—		—		—		2	0
Celje	Total		68	8	12	1	2	0	—		82	9
Olimpija Ljubljana	2016–17	PrvaLiga	24	4	4	0	—		—		28	4
Olimpija Ljubljana	2017–18	PrvaLiga	20	3	3	1	2	0	—		25	4
Olimpija Ljubljana	2018–19	PrvaLiga	1	0	—		2 (Note: One appearance in the UEFA Champions League, one appearance in the UEFA Europa League)	0	—		3	0
Olimpija Ljubljana	Total		45	7	7	1	4	0	—		56	8
Orenburg	2018–19	Russian Premier League	27	1	3	0	—		—		30	1
Orenburg	2019–20	Russian Premier League	22	0	0	0	—		—		22	0
Orenburg	Total		49	1	3	0	0	0	—		52	1
Ural Yekaterinburg	2020–21	Russian Premier League	26	0	3	0	—		—		29	0
Ural Yekaterinburg	2021–22	Russian Premier League	21	3	0	0	—		—		21	3
Ural Yekaterinburg	2022–23	Russian Premier League	27	3	10	0	—		—		37	3
Ural Yekaterinburg	2023–24	Russian Premier League	26	3	7	0	—		2 (Note: Appearances in the relegation play-offs)	0	35	3
Ural Yekaterinburg	2024–25	Russian First League	1	0	0	0	—		—		1	0
Ural Yekaterinburg	Total		101	9	20	0	0	0	2	0	123	9
Career total			303	25	43	2	7	0	2	0	355	27
