= Tadej Vidmajer =

Slovenian footballer

Personal information
- Full name: Tadej Vidmajer
- Date of birth: 10 March 1992 (age 34)
- Place of birth: Celje, Slovenia
- Height: 1.78 m (5 ft 10 in)
- Position: Left-back

Team information
- Current team: USV Wies
- Number: 3

Youth career
- 1999–2002: Zalec
- 2002–2011: Celje

Senior career*
Years	Team	Apps	(Gls)
2011–2020	Celje	185	(3)
2012–2013	→ Šmartno 1928 (loan)	17	(4)
2020	ŁKS Łódź	8	(0)
2022	SV Wildon	12	(3)
2023–	USV Wies	22	(7)
- * Club domestic league appearances and goals as of 8 February 2024

Tadej Vidmajer (born 10 March 1992) is a Slovenian footballer who plays for USV Wies as a left-back.
