= Žiga Kous =

Slovenian footballer (born 1992)

Personal information
- Date of birth: 27 October 1992 (age 34)
- Place of birth: Murska Sobota, Slovenia
- Height: 1.78 m (5 ft 10 in)
- Positions: Midfielder; right-back

Team information
- Current team: SC Pinkafeld
- Number: 11

Youth career
- –2011: Mura 05

Senior career*
Years	Team	Apps	(Gls)
2009–2011	Mura 05	38	(1)
2011–2015	Domžale	61	(4)
2011–2012	→ Mura 05 (loan)	25	(0)
2015–2017	Celje	34	(0)
2017–2024	Mura	193	(7)
2024–2025	SVH Waldbach	25	(8)
2025–	SC Pinkafeld	29	(5)

International career
2008–2009	Slovenia U17	8	(0)
2010	Slovenia U19	4	(0)
2011–2012	Slovenia U20	3	(0)
2013	Slovenia U21	6	(0)
- * Club domestic league appearances and goals as of 20 June 2026

Žiga Kous (born 27 October 1992) is a Slovenian former professional footballer who played as a midfielder. After retirement, he also played amateur football in the Austrian lower leagues.

== Honours ==
Mura

- Slovenian First League: 2020–21
- Slovenian Cup: 2019–20
- Slovenian Second League: 2017–18
