= Matej Podlogar =

Slovenian footballer

Personal information
- Date of birth: 23 February 1991 (age 35)
- Place of birth: Ljubljana, SFR Yugoslavia
- Height: 1.84 m (6 ft 0 in)
- Positions: Forward; winger

Team information
- Current team: Slovenia U15 (manager)

Youth career
- –2010: Interblock
- 2008–2009: → Svoboda (loan)

Senior career*
Years	Team	Apps	(Gls)
2010–2011	Interblock	23	(2)
2011–2014	Rudar Velenje	96	(18)
2014–2015	Domžale	30	(7)
2015–2017	Celje	44	(10)
2017	Lamia	0	(0)
2017	Triglav Kranj	8	(1)
2018	Olimpia Grudziądz	13	(2)
2018–2023	Domžale	144	(16)
Total		358	(56)

International career
2012	Slovenia U21	5	(1)
2017	Slovenia B	1	(0)

Managerial career
- 2024: Domžale (caretaker)
- 2026–: Slovenia U15
- * Club domestic league appearances and goals

Matej Podlogar (born 23 February 1991) is a former Slovenian footballer who played as a forward or winger.
