= Sunny Omoregie =

Nigerian footballer

Personal information
- Full name: Ogbemudia Omoregie Sunny
- Date of birth: 2 January 1989 (age 37)
- Place of birth: Benin City, Nigeria
- Height: 1.84 m (6 ft 1/2 in)
- Position: Forward

Youth career
- 1994–2002: Osmade Babes
- 2003–2004: Numancia
- 2004–2005: Real Madrid
- 2005–2006: Espanyol
- 2006–2007: Montañeros

Senior career*
Years	Team	Apps	(Gls)
2007–2010	Numancia B		
2010	Victoria		
2010–2011	Torrevieja		
2011–2012	Binéfar	17	(5)
2012	Tomelloso		
2012	Palencia	15	(9)
2013	Gżira United	12	(5)
2013	Thunder Bay Chill	12	(8)
2014	Gżira United		
2013–2014	Mérida	30	(20)
2014–2016	Celje	62	(15)
2016–2019	Maribor	16	(5)
2017	→ Hapoel Kfar Saba (loan)	8	(1)
2018	→ Alashkert (loan)	9	(5)
2019	Always Ready	15	(3)
2021	Lincoln Red Imps	5	(1)
2021	Atlético Astorga		
2022	Olivenza	6	(2)
- * Club domestic league appearances and goals as of 9 January 2023

Sunny Ogbemudia Omoregie (born 2 January 1989) is a Nigerian footballer who plays as a forward.

== Career ==
On 21 February 2018, Omoregie joined Alashkert on loan from Maribor for the remainder of the 2017–18 season.
