= Ivan Firer =

Slovenian football forward

Personal information
- Date of birth: 19 November 1984 (age 41)
- Place of birth: Celje, SFR Yugoslavia
- Height: 1.89 m (6 ft 2 in)
- Position: Forward

Youth career
- Mons Claudius

Senior career*
Years	Team	Apps	(Gls)
2005–2006	Mons Claudius	31	(12)
2006–2007	Aluminij	25	(5)
2007–2008	UMF Grindavík	14	(4)
2008–2009	Mons Claudius	32	(17)
2010	Dravinja	12	(11)
2010	Drava Ptuj	15	(8)
2011	Celje	30	(5)
2012	Šmarje pri Jelšah		
2012–2015	Rudar Velenje	101	(18)
2015	Celje	19	(4)
2016	Thanh Hóa	11	(3)
2016	Becamex Bình Dương	13	(4)
2017	Domžale	19	(4)
2017–2018	Auxerre	12	(0)
2018	Auxerre II	3	(1)
2018–2019	Rogaška	18	(6)
2019–2020	Straža Hum na Sutli	14	(6)
2020–2021	Zagorec Krapina	31	(11)
2021–2023	Straža Hum na Sutli	52	(19)

International career
2014	Slovenia	1	(0)
- * Club domestic league appearances and goals

Ivan Firer (born 19 November 1984) is a retired Slovenian footballer who played as a forward.

== Career ==
Firer made one appearance for the Slovenia national team, when he substituted Milivoje Novaković late on in a June 2014 friendly match against Argentina.
