= Nino Pungaršek =

Slovenian footballer (born 1995)

Personal information
- Date of birth: 1 November 1995 (age 31)
- Place of birth: Celje, Slovenia
- Height: 1.71 m (5 ft 7 in)
- Position: Midfielder

Youth career
- –2014: Celje

Senior career*
Years	Team	Apps	(Gls)
2014–2021	Celje	118	(11)
2014	→ Šmartno 1928 (loan)	15	(2)
2015	→ Bravo (loan)	11	(1)
2021–2022	Olimpija Ljubljana	13	(1)
2022–2026	ASK Voitsberg	85	(5)

International career
2010	Slovenia U16	1	(0)
- * Club domestic league appearances and goals as of 26 June 2026

Nino Pungaršek (born 1 November 1995) is a Slovenian footballer who plays as a midfielder.

== Honours ==
Celje

- Slovenian PrvaLiga: 2019–20

Olimpija Ljubljana

- Slovenian Cup: 2020–21
