= Damir Hadžić (footballer, born 1984) =

Slovenian footballer

Damir Hadžič
Personal information
- Full name: Damir Hadžić
- Date of birth: 1 October 1984 (age 42)
- Place of birth: Izola, SFR Yugoslavia
- Height: 1.89 m (6 ft 2 in)
- Position: Defender

Youth career
- –2002: Izola

Senior career*
Years	Team	Apps	(Gls)
2002–2003	Izola	24	(0)
2003–2004	Koper	22	(0)
2004–2005	Celje	16	(0)
2004	→ Krško (loan)	1	(0)
2005	Koper	13	(0)
2006–2008	Celje	60	(2)
2008–2009	Primorje	7	(0)
2009–2015	Koper	156	(9)
2015–2017	Celje	40	(2)
2017–2018	Kras Repen	27	(2)
2018–2020	Koper	43	(4)
2020–2021	Izola	15	(3)
2021	Jadran Dekani	0	(0)

International career
2001	Slovenia U17		
2003–2005	Slovenia U20	9	(0)
2003–2006	Slovenia U21	18	(1)
- * Club domestic league appearances and goals as of 14 September 2020

Damir Hadžič (born 1 October 1984) is a Slovenian retired footballer who played as a defender.
