= Tilen Klemenčič =

Slovenian footballer (born 1995)

Personal information
- Date of birth: 21 August 1995 (age 31)
- Place of birth: Slovenia
- Height: 1.80 m (5 ft 11 in)
- Position: Defender

Team information
- Current team: Triglav Kranj

Youth career
- –2013: Triglav Kranj

Senior career*
Years	Team	Apps	(Gls)
2012–2014	Triglav Kranj	54	(0)
2014–2017	Celje	72	(3)
2017–2024	Domžale	148	(9)
2024–2026	Primorje	59	(0)
2026–	Triglav Kranj	0	(0)

International career
2010	Slovenia U16	2	(0)
2011–2012	Slovenia U17	7	(0)
2013	Slovenia U18	9	(0)
2013	Slovenia U19	4	(0)
2019	Slovenia B	1	(0)
- * Club domestic league appearances and goals as of 14 July 2026

Tilen Klemenčič (born 21 August 1995) is a Slovenian footballer who plays as a defender for Triglav Kranj.
