= Robert Pevnik =

Slovenian footballer and manager

Personal information
- Date of birth: 18 February 1969 (age 57)
- Place of birth: Celje, SFR Yugoslavia
- Position: Defender

Team information
- Current team: Bistrica (head coach)

Senior career*
Years	Team	Apps	(Gls)
1991–1994	Celje	98	(11)
1994	Koper	1	(0)
1995	Olimpija	10	(0)
1996	Rudar Velenje	6	(0)
1997	Korotan Prevalje	10	(0)
1999	Beltinci	7	(0)
2000	Šentjur	13	(7)
2001	Livar	1	(0)
2001–2002	Dravinja	26	(6)
2002	Bled	2	(0)
2003	Livar	12	(1)
2003–2004	Zreče	16	(1)

Managerial career
- 2007: Drava Ptuj
- 2008: Domžale
- 2009–2010: Olimpija Ljubljana
- 2010–2011: Rudar Velenje
- 2011: Mura 05
- 2011: Radomlje
- 2012: Rabotnički
- 2012–2013: Dravinja
- 2013: Radomlje
- 2013–2014: Aluminij
- 2014–2015: Legionovia Legionowo
- 2016: Celje
- 2017: Radomlje
- 2017–2018: Legionovia Legionowo
- 2019: Olimpija Ljubljana
- 2022–2024: Aluminij
- 2024–: Bistrica
- * Club domestic league appearances and goals

Robert Pevnik (born 18 February 1969) is a Slovenian football manager and former player who is the head coach of Bistrica.
