= Lovre Čirjak =

Croatian footballer

Personal information
- Date of birth: 2 November 1991 (age 35)
- Place of birth: Zadar, Croatia
- Height: 1.76 m (5 ft 9 in)
- Position: Left winger

Team information
- Current team: HNK Zadar

Youth career
- 2002-2004: Arbanasi
- 2004: Dalmatinac Crno
- 2005–2006: Zadar
- 2006–2009: Dinamo Zagreb

Senior career*
Years	Team	Apps	(Gls)
2009–2011	Novalja	44	(13)
2011–2012	Raštane	25	(8)
2012–2013	Primorac Biograd	12	(5)
2013	Shkëndija	12	(2)
2014–2016	Zadar	44	(6)
2016–2017	Celje	34	(7)
2017–2018	Inter Zaprešić	12	(1)
2018	Nizhny Novgorod	23	(2)
2019	Krško	16	(14)
2020	Koper	10	(0)
2021	Hapoel Afula	26	(0)
2022	Hrvatski Dragovoljac	8	(0)
2022–2024	Hrvatski Vitez Posedarje	54	(30)
2024–	HNK Zadar		
- * Club domestic league appearances and goals as of 24 July 2024

Lovre Čirjak (born 2 November 1991) is a Croatian football player who plays for HNK Zadar as a winger.

== Club career ==
He made his Croatian First Football League debut for Zadar on 21 July 2014 in a game against RNK Split.

In 2022/23 he was the top scorer of the fourth-tier Croatian Third Football League South playing for Hrvatski Vitez Posedarje.In the summer of 2024, he returned to his hometown of Zadar to play for HNK Zadar in the same league.
