= Blaž Vrhovec =

Slovenian footballer (born 1992)

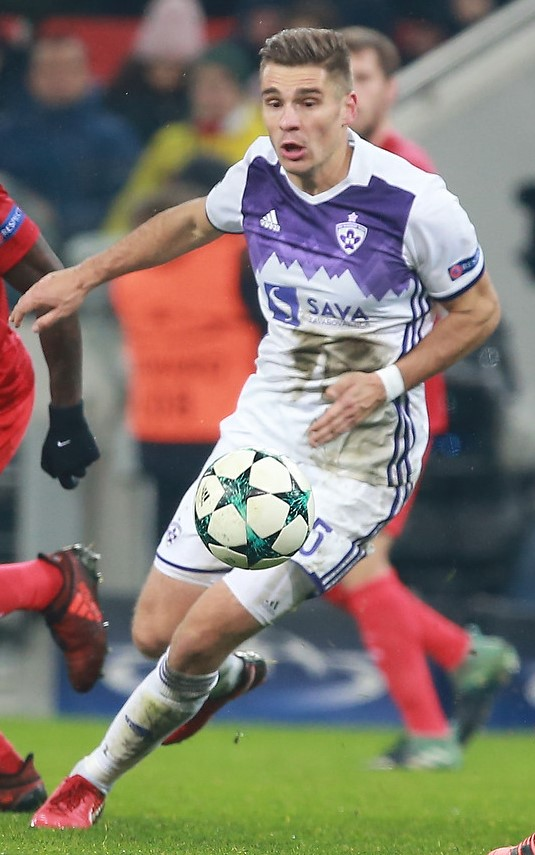
- Vrhovec with Maribor in November 2017

Personal information
- Date of birth: 20 February 1992 (age 34)
- Place of birth: Ljubljana, Slovenia
- Height: 1.80 m (5 ft 11 in)
- Position: Midfielder

Youth career
- –2008: Svoboda
- 2008–2009: Slovan
- 2010–2011: Interblock

Senior career*
Years	Team	Apps	(Gls)
2011–2012	Interblock	25	(1)
2012–2016	Celje	111	(6)
2016–2022	Maribor	143	(9)
2022	Anorthosis	11	(2)
2022–2023	Górnik Zabrze	13	(0)
2023–2025	Maribor	32	(0)
Total		335	(18)

International career
2010	Slovenia U19	3	(0)
2011–2013	Slovenia U20	8	(1)
2012–2014	Slovenia U21	14	(1)
2016–2021	Slovenia	5	(0)
2019	Slovenia B	1	(0)
- * Club domestic league appearances and goals

Blaž Vrhovec (born 20 February 1992) is a Slovenian retired footballer who played as a midfielder.

== Career ==
Vrhovec made his debut in European competitions for Celje on 5 July 2012, in the UEFA Europa League first preliminary round match against Dacia Chişinău. He scored his first goal in the Slovenian top division on 12 August 2012 against Mura 05. On 23 March 2016, he made his debut for the Slovenia national football team against Macedonia.

In June 2016, Vrhovec signed a three-year contract with Maribor.

On 15 January 2022, after five-and-a-half years with Maribor, Vrhovec signed for the Cypriot First Division side Anorthosis Famagusta until 2024. However, his contract with Anorthosis was terminated on 31 August 2022.

Two days later, on 2 September 2022, he joined Polish Ekstraklasa side Górnik Zabrze on a one-year deal with an extension option.

== Career statistics ==
=== Club ===
As of match played 14 April 2023

Appearances and goals by club, season and competition
Club	Season	League			National cup		Continental		Total	
Club	Season	Division	Apps	Goals	Apps	Goals	Apps	Goals	Apps	Goals
Interblock	2011–12	Slovenian Second League	25	1	3	0	—		28	1
Celje	2012–13	Slovenian PrvaLiga	27	1	5	0	2 (Note: Appearances in UEFA Europa League)	0	34	1
Celje	2013–14	Slovenian PrvaLiga	29	2	2	0	1	0	32	2
Celje	2014–15	Slovenian PrvaLiga	25	2	5	1	—		30	3
Celje	2015–16	Slovenian PrvaLiga	30	1	6	0	2	0	38	1
Celje	Total		111	6	18	1	5	0	134	7
Maribor	2016–17	Slovenian PrvaLiga	27	0	5	0	6	0	38	0
Maribor	2017–18	Slovenian PrvaLiga	21	2	2	0	10 (Note: Appearances in UEFA Champions League)	0	33	2
Maribor	2018–19	Slovenian PrvaLiga	27	3	6	0	6	0	39	3
Maribor	2019–20	Slovenian PrvaLiga	25	0	0	0	8 (Note: Six appearances in UEFA Champions League, two appearances in UEFA Europa League)	0	33	0
Maribor	2020–21	Slovenian PrvaLiga	28	1	0	0	0	0	28	1
Maribor	2021–22	Slovenian PrvaLiga	15	3	1	0	4 (Note: Appearances in UEFA Europa Conference League)	0	20	3
Maribor	Total		143	9	14	0	34	0	191	9
Anorthosis	2021–22	Cypriot First Division	11	2	4	0	—		15	2
Górnik Zabrze	2022–23	Ekstraklasa	13	0	2	0	—		15	0
Career total			303	18	41	1	39	0	383	19

== Honours ==
Maribor

- Slovenian PrvaLiga: 2016–17, 2018–19
