= Stadion Z'dežele =

Football stadium in Celje, Slovenia

- UEFA Category 4 stadium
- Interactive map of Stadion Z'dežele
- Former names: Arena Petrol (2003–2017)
- Location: Lower Hudinja, Celje, Slovenia
- Coordinates: 46°14′48″N 15°16′12″E
- Owner: City Municipality of Celje
- Operator: ZPO Celje
- Capacity: 13,059
- Surface: Grass
- Record attendance: 12,512 (Celje–Fiorentina, 10 April 2025)
- Field size: 105 by 68 metres (115 by 74 yards)

Construction
- Groundbreaking: 1999
- Built: 1999–2003
- Opened: 9 September 2003
- Renovated: 2024
- Expanded: 2004–2008
- Cost: €16.5 million
- Architects: Bojan Purg, Dragan Stevovič, Reichenberg architects
- General contractor: CM Celje

Tenants
- Celje (2003–present); Šampion Celje (2011–2014)

Stadion Z'dežele is a football stadium in Celje, Slovenia. It is the home ground of NK Celje and has a seating capacity of 13,059. The stadium stands in the sports park under Golovec on the site of the former Opekarniška jama clay pit and was built in stages between 1999 and 2008. Between 2003 and 2017, the stadium was named Arena Petrol.

The ground opened in September 2003 with the completion of the east grandstand, and three further stands were added over the following five years. It served as the principal home venue of the Slovenia national football team during much of the qualification campaigns for the 2006 FIFA World Cup and UEFA Euro 2008. The stadium also hosted three group-stage matches at the 2021 UEFA European Under-21 Championship.

A major redevelopment in 2024 upgraded the stadium from UEFA Category 2 to Category 4. The renovation enabled Celje to stage later-round and league-phase UEFA club matches at its home ground. The stadium attendance record is 12,512, set for Celje's 2024–25 UEFA Conference League quarter-final first leg against Fiorentina on 10 April 2025.

== History ==
=== Construction and opening ===
NK Celje previously played at Skalna Klet, which later became the club's training ground. Construction of a new football stadium began in 1999 in the disused Opekarniška jama, a former clay pit in the sports park under Golovec. The shape of the site influenced the later design of the ground, with the western and southern stands set into the slopes of the former pit, creating a partly natural amphitheatre.

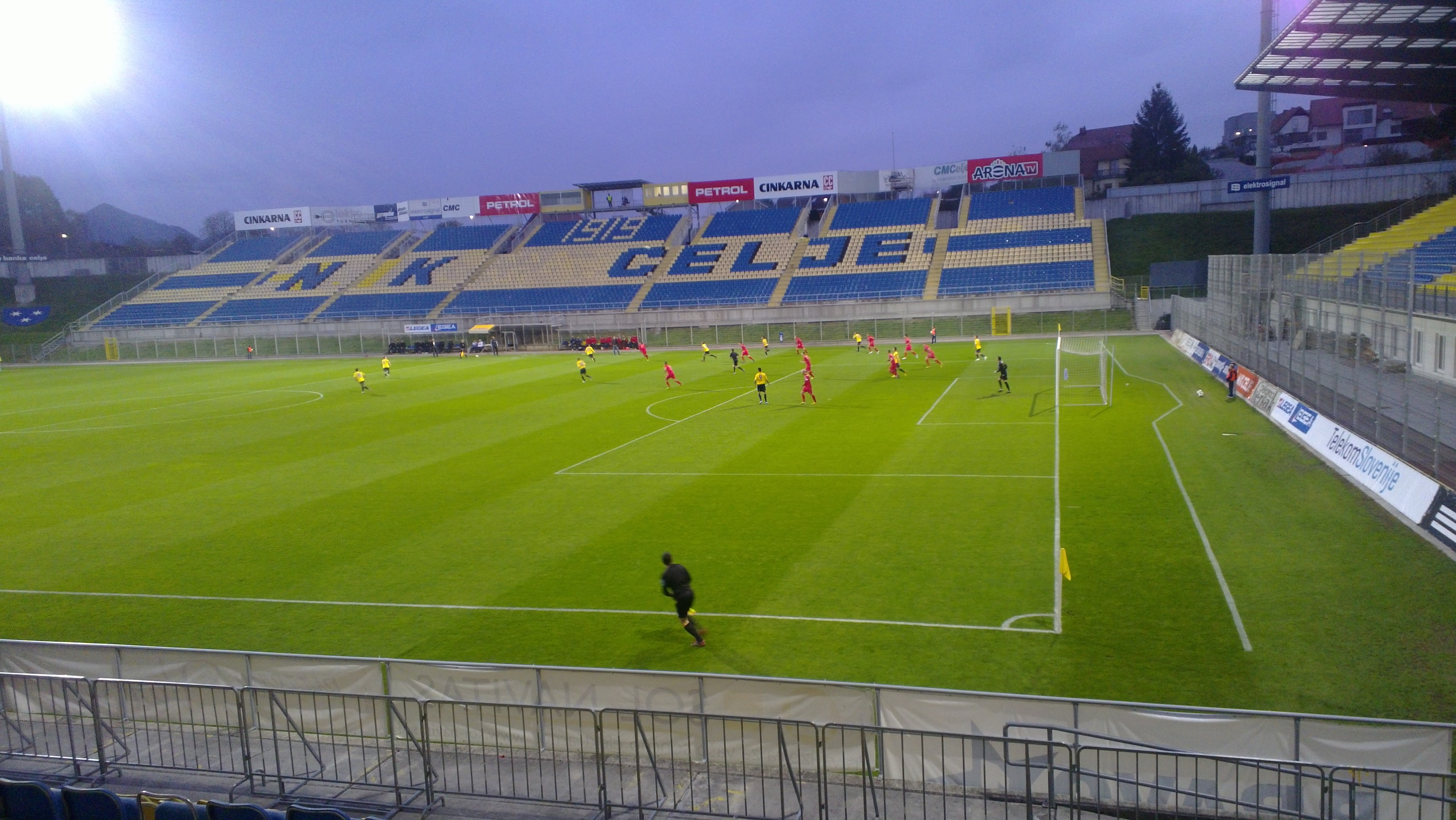
West stand in 2013

The first part of the stadium to be completed was the covered eastern main stand, with 3,600 seats. The first match at the new ground was played on 9 September 2003, when the Slovenia and France under-21 teams drew 0–0. The official opening followed on 12 September, when Celje defeated Ljubljana 3–1 in the Slovenian First League. Simon Sešlar scored Celje's first goal at the new stadium.

=== Expansion to four stands ===
The stadium was enlarged in stages after its opening. The 4,850-seat west stand entered use in 2004. Its first major international fixture was Slovenia's 1–0 victory over Italy in the 2006 FIFA World Cup qualifiers on 9 October 2004.

The 1,500-seat south stand followed in 2005 and was first used for Slovenia's World Cup qualifier against Norway on 3 September. The match drew 10,055 spectators, which remained the stadium record for almost twenty years. The fourth and final stand, the covered north stand with 3,000 seats, was completed in February 2008 and first opened to spectators for Celje's league match against Nafta on 2 March 2008. Its completion brought the stadium to its present capacity of 13,059.

The total cost of the original construction and expansion was €16.5 million. The east stand was designed by Bojan Purg, the south stand by Dragan Stevovič, and the west and north stands by Reichenberg architects; CM Celje was the main contractor.

=== Naming rights ===
The stadium was known as Arena Petrol from its opening until 2017, under a naming-rights agreement with Slovenian energy company Petrol. In July 2017 it was renamed Arena Z'dežele. Z'dežele is a brand of Celjske mesnine, a Celje-based meat producer. In 2021, NK Celje and Celjske mesnine extended their partnership for a further five years, with the stadium continuing under the name Stadion Z'dežele.

=== 2024 renovation ===
By May 2024 the stadium was rated Category 2 under UEFA criteria, which meant that Celje could use it only for the first two qualifying rounds of UEFA club competitions. The City Municipality of Celje therefore carried out a comprehensive redevelopment during 2024. The project cost approximately €2 million and was financed by the Municipality of Celje, the Slovenian Ministry of Economy, Tourism and Sports, and UEFA HatTrick funds, which were distributed through the Football Association of Slovenia.

The work included new electronic turnstiles, a control room and CCTV system, upgraded referee and away team dressing rooms, doping control rooms, two television studios and additional television commentary positions. The pitch lighting was replaced by a 1,500-lux LED system, while additional VIP areas, a new public-address system, extra parking and improved media facilities were also added. Following the work, the ground received UEFA Category 4 status, the highest category in UEFA's stadium classification system.

== Architecture and facilities ==
East grandstand entrance plaza in 2026

The stadium has four stands arranged closely around a 105 by 68 metre natural grass pitch. More than 7,000 of its 13,059 seats are covered. The pitch is equipped with under-soil heating and a computer-controlled irrigation system that monitors moisture levels and waters the surface when required.

Aerial view of Stadion Z'dežele and its surroundings in 2026

The east grandstand contains 3,600 seats and is distinguished by a glass-fronted rear façade. Approximately 3,000 m^{2} (32,000 sq ft) of business and operational space lies behind and beneath the stand, including club facilities. It also contains the main dressing rooms, medical and doping control rooms, media facilities and VIP areas.

The west stand is the largest, with 4,850 seats. It is built into one of the slopes of the former clay pit and includes positions used by television production crews. The south stand has 1,500 seats and is traditionally used for organised supporter groups and away supporters. A large video scoreboard is located on this side of the ground.

The covered north stand has 3,000 seats. A glass-fronted structure connects it to the east stand; together, the north stand and adjoining building contain approximately 8,400 m^{2} (90,000 sq ft) of office, retail and hospitality space. Across the stadium complex, the total amount of business space is approximately 11,400 m^{2} (123,000 sq ft).

== Football use ==
=== NK Celje and European competitions ===
Stadion Z'dežele during Celje's UEFA Champions League play-off against Slovan Bratislava in August 2026

Stadion Z'dežele has been NK Celje's home ground since 2003, replacing Skalna Klet. The 2024 renovation coincided with the club's first qualification for the league phase of a UEFA competition, allowing Celje to stage its 2024–25 European fixtures in Celje rather than relocate later-round home matches.

On 10 April 2025, the stadium hosted the first leg of Celje's 2024–25 UEFA Conference League quarter-final against Fiorentina, the first European quarter-final in the club's history. Fiorentina won 2–1 in front of 12,512 spectators, setting a new stadium attendance record.

The ground staged a UEFA Champions League qualifying play-off for the first time on 26 August 2026, when Celje hosted Slovan Bratislava in the second leg of the 2026–27 play-off round. Celje lost 2–1 after extra time and were eliminated 3–2 on aggregate; the match was attended by 11,500 spectators.

=== Slovenia national team ===
The senior Slovenia national team played its first match at the stadium on 31 March 2004, a friendly against Latvia. Celje subsequently became the team's principal home venue, and Slovenia played all of its home matches there during the 2006 FIFA World Cup and UEFA Euro 2008 qualifying campaigns. After the expansion and redevelopment of Ljudski vrt and the opening of Stožice Stadium, national team matches in Celje became less frequent.

One of the stadium's best-known internationals was Slovenia's 1–0 World Cup qualifying victory over Italy on 9 October 2004, when substitute Boštjan Cesar scored the only goal of the match in the 82nd minute. Slovenia were the last national team to defeat Italy before they went on to win the 2006 FIFA World Cup.

==== Slovenia national team matches ====
Date	Competition	Opponent	Result
31 March 2004	Friendly	Latvia	0–1
4 September 2004	2006 FIFA World Cup Q	Moldova	3–0
9 October 2004	2006 FIFA World Cup Q	Italy	1–0
9 February 2005	Friendly	Czech Republic	0–3
26 March 2005	Friendly	Germany	0–1
30 March 2005	2006 FIFA World Cup Q	Belarus	1–1
3 September 2005	2006 FIFA World Cup Q	Norway	2–3
12 October 2005	2006 FIFA World Cup Q	Scotland	0–3
31 May 2006	Friendly	Trinidad and Tobago	3–1
15 August 2006	Friendly	Israel	1–1
7 October 2006	UEFA Euro 2008 Q	Luxembourg	2–0
28 March 2007	UEFA Euro 2008 Q	Netherlands	0–1
2 June 2007	UEFA Euro 2008 Q	Romania	1–2
12 September 2007	UEFA Euro 2008 Q	Belarus	1–0
13 October 2007	UEFA Euro 2008 Q	Albania	0–0
21 November 2007	UEFA Euro 2008 Q	Bulgaria	0–2
19 November 2013	Friendly	Canada	1–0
10 June 2025	Friendly	Bosnia and Herzegovina	2–1

=== 2021 UEFA European Under-21 Championship ===
Celje was one of four Slovenian host cities for the 2021 UEFA European Under-21 Championship, which Slovenia co-hosted with Hungary. Stadion Z'dežele, listed by UEFA for the tournament as Stadion Celje, staged three Group B matches.

Date	Team 1	Score	Team 2	Round
24 March 2021	Czech Republic	1–1	Italy	Group B
27 March 2021	Slovenia	1–1	Czech Republic	Group B
30 March 2021	Spain	2–0	Czech Republic	Group B

== See also ==
- List of football stadiums in Slovenia
