= 2016–17 NK Domžale season =

NK Domžale
2016–17 season
- President: Stane Oražem
- Head Coach: Simon Rožman
- Stadium: Domžale Sports Park
- Slovenian League: 3rd
- Slovenian Cup: Semi-finals
- Europa League: 3rd qualifying round
- Top goalscorer: League: Marko Alvir; Slobodan Vuk (8); All: Marko Alvir; Slobodan Vuk (9)
- Highest home attendance: 3,000 (vs Olimpija)
- Lowest home attendance: 300 (vs Radomlje)
- Average home league attendance: 1,109
Home colours	Away colours	Third colours
- All statistics correct as of 13 December 2016.

The 2016–17 season marked Domžale's 19th campaign in the Slovenian PrvaLiga, the top division in Slovenia, since the league was created. Domžale competed in Slovenian PrvaLiga, the Slovenian Football Cup and UEFA Europa League.

== Players ==
As of 13 December 2016

Note: Flags indicate national team as defined under FIFA eligibility rules; some limited exceptions apply. Players may hold more than one non-FIFA nationality.

No.	Pos.	Nation	Player
—	GK	SLO	Dejan Milić
—	GK	SLO	Adnan Golubovič
—	GK	BIH	Ajdin Mulalić
—	GK	FRA	Axel Maraval
—	DF	ESP	Álvaro Brachi
—	DF	SLO	Žan Žužek
—	DF	SLO	Dominik Ivkić
—	DF	SLO	Matija Širok
—	DF	SLO	Denis Halilović
—	DF	SLO	Miha Blažič
—	DF	SLO	Gaber Dobrovoljc
—	DF	SLO	Jure Balkovec
—	DF	CRO	Marko Alvir
—	MF	SLO	Amedej Vetrih

No.	Pos.	Nation	Player
—	MF	SLO	Luka Volarič
—	MF	AZE	Samir Masimov
—	MF	BRA	Juninho
—	MF	SLO	Jure Matjašič
—	MF	SLO	Jan Repas
—	MF	SLO	Žan Majer
—	DF	SLO	Luka Žinko (captain)
—	MF	MKD	Zeni Husmani
—	MF	MNE	Veljko Batrović
—	FW	SLO	Slobodan Vuk
—	FW	GER	Senad Jarović
—	FW	SLO	Elvis Bratanović
—	FW	CRO	Antonio Mance

Source: NK Domžale

== Pre-season and friendlies ==
=== Summer ===
15 June 2016 1	Domžale (Slovenia)	3–2	(North Macedonia) Shkëndija	Rogatec
18:00 CEST (UTC+02:00)	Morel 40'; Vetrih 77'; Juninho 85'	Report (in Slovene)	Todorovski 18'; Shefiti 68'	Stadium: Rogatec Sports Park; Attendance: 100; Referee: Vojko Goričan

18 June 2016 2	Domžale	1–1	Celje	Radomlje
18:00 CEST (UTC+02:00)	Mance 13'	Report (in Slovene)	Mihaljević 72' (pen.)	Stadium: Radomlje Sports Park; Attendance: 50; Referee: Leon Pašalić

24 June 2016 3	Domžale	3–1	Kalcer Radomlje	Domžale
20:00 CEST (UTC+02:00)	Mance 26'; Črnic 50', 58'	Report (in Slovene)	Šipek 90'	Stadium: Domžale Sports Park; Attendance: 100; Referee: Leon Pašalić

25 June 2016 4	Domžale (Slovenia)	6–1	(Bosnia and Herzegovina) Sloboda	Domžale
19:00 CEST (UTC+02:00)	Brachi 5'; Balkovec 7', 19' (pen.); Vuk 22', 59'; Ivkić 84'	Report (in Slovene)	Fatić 72'	Stadium: Domžale Sports Park; Attendance: 200; Referee: Leon Pašalić

1 July 2016 5	Domžale	5–0	Dob	Domžale
18:00 CEST (UTC+02:00)	Repas 17'; Olaha 21', 42'; Janković 38'; Jarović 60'	Report (in Slovene)		Stadium: Domžale Sports Park

== Competitions ==
=== Overall ===
Competition	Started round	Current position / round	Final position / round	First match	Last match
PrvaLiga	Pre-season	3rd		16 July 2016	27 May 2017
Cup	Round of 16	Semi-finals		13 September 2016	
UEFA Europa League	First qualifying round	—	Third qualifying round	30 June 2016	4 August 2016

Updated to match played 13 December 2016
Source: Competitions

=== Overview ===
Competition	Record							
Competition	G	W	D	L	GF	GA	GD	Win %
PrvaLiga	21	12	3	6	45	22	+23	57.14
Cup	3	3	0	0	8	2	+6	100.00
Europa League	6	4	1	1	10	8	+2	66.67
Total	30	19	4	7	63	32	+31	63.33

Updated to match played 13 December 2016
Source: Competitions

=== PrvaLiga ===
==== League table ====
Pos	Team	Pld	W	D	L	GF	GA	GD	Pts	Qualification or relegation
2	Gorica	36	16	12	8	48	39	+9	60 (Note: Gorica ahead of Olimpija on head-to-head record: Olimpija–Gorica 1–0, Gorica–Olimpija 1–1, Olimpija–Gorica 1–2, Gorica–Olimpija 1–0)	Qualification for the Europa League first qualifying round (Note: Domžale qualified for Europa League first qualifying round by winning the 2016–17 Slovenian Football Cup.)
3	Olimpija Ljubljana	36	17	9	10	49	35	+14	60	Qualification for the Europa League first qualifying round
4	Domžale	36	16	8	12	63	45	+18	56	Qualification for the Europa League first qualifying round
5	Celje	36	15	10	11	48	39	+9	55	
6	Koper (R)	36	12	14	10	43	40	+3	50	Relegation to fourth tier (Note: Koper did not get a competition licence and was thus relegated to the fourth division.)

Source: PrvaLiga (in Slovene), Soccerway
Rules for classification: 1) Points; 2) Head-to-head points; 3) Head-to-head goal difference; 4) Head-to-head away goals scored; 5) Goal difference; 6) Goals scored; 7) Away goals scored; 8) Fairplay ranking; 9) Draw.
(R) Relegated

==== Results summary ====
Overall								Home						Away					
Pld	W	D	L	GF	GA	GD	Pts	W	D	L	GF	GA	GD	W	D	L	GF	GA	GD
27	14	5	8	51	29	+22	47	10	1	3	30	13	+17	4	4	5	21	16	+5

Last updated: 01 April 2017.
Source: Competitive matches

==== Results by round ====
Round	1	2	3	4	5	6	7	8	9	10	11	12	13	14	15	16	17	18	19	20	21	22	23	24	25	26	27	28	29	30	31	32	33	34	35	36
Ground	H	A	H	A	H	H	A	H	A	A	H	A	H	A	A	H	A	H	H	A	H	A	H	H	A	H	A	A	H	A	H	A	A	H	A	H
Result	W	D	D	W	W	L	L	W	L	W	W	L	W	W	L	W	W	W	L	D	W	D	L	W	L	W	D									
Position	1	3	5	2	1	3	5	5	5	3	3	3	3	3	3	3	3	3	3	3	3	3	3	3	3	3	2									

Updated to match(es) played on 01 April 2017. Source: Competitive matches
A = Away; H = Home; W = Win; D = Draw; L = Loss

==== Matches ====
Win Draw Loss Fixtures

16 July 2016 1	Domžale	2–0	Radomlje	Domžale
18:15 CEST (UTC+02:00)	Vuk 5'; Juninho 56'	Report (in Slovene)	Stoiljković (yellow card) 38'	Stadium: Domžale Sports Park; Attendance: 1,000; Referee: Dejan Balažič

24 July 2016 2	Krško	1–1	Domžale	Krško
18:15 CEST (UTC+02:00)	Bučar 22'; Dangubić (yellow card) 77'; Vokić (yellow card) 85'	Report (in Slovene)	Alvir (yellow card) 14'; Vuk 67' (pen.)	Stadium: Matija Gubec Stadium; Attendance: 1,000; Referee: Slavko Vinčić

17 July 2016 3	Domžale	2–2	Maribor	Domžale
20:15 CEST (UTC+02:00)	Juninho 49'; Balkovec 65'; Širok (yellow card) 82'	Report (in Slovene)	Blažič 28' (o.g.); Bohar 30'; Pihler (yellow card) 38'	Stadium: Domžale Sports Park; Attendance: 2,500; Referee: Matej Jug

7 August 2016 4	Rudar	0–2	Domžale	Velenje
18:15 CEST (UTC+02:00)	Kašnik (yellow card) 7'; Babić (yellow card) 9'; Vručina (yellow card) 88'	Report (in Slovene)	Morel 8' (pen.); Juninho 86'	Stadium: Ob Jezeru City Stadium; Attendance: 600; Referee: Roberto Ponis

13 August 2016 5	Domžale	2–0	Koper	Domžale
20:15 CEST (UTC+02:00)	Horvat (yellow card) 44'; Mance (yellow card) 45', (goal) 88'; Morel 47'; Brachi (yellow card) 90'; Alvir (yellow card) 90'	Report (in Slovene)	Teijo (yellow card) 72'; Gregov (yellow card) 90+2'	Stadium: Domžale Sports Park; Attendance: 600; Referee: Miran Bukovec

20 August 2016 6	Domžale	1–3	Olimpija	Domžale
20:15 CEST (UTC+02:00)	Morel (yellow card) 69'; Alvir 80'	http://www.prvaliga.si/tekmovanja/?action=tekma&id_menu=217&id_tekme=39907&prikaz=4 [Report (in Slovene)]	Zajc 19'; Kronaveter 63'; Wobay 77'; Zarifović (yellow card) 90+3'	Stadium: Domžale Sports Park; Attendance: 3,000; Referee: Dejan Balažič

26 August 2016 7	Gorica	3–1	Domžale	Nova Gorica
20:15 CEST (UTC+02:00)	Arčon 6', 74'; Nagode (yellow card) 47'; Kapić 82'	Report (in Slovene)	Morel (yellow card) 11'; Dobrovoljc (yellow card) 40'; Bratanović 61'	Stadium: Nova Gorica Sports Park; Attendance: 730; Referee: Vojko Goričan

9 September 2016 8	Domžale	2–0	Aluminij	Domžale
20:15 CEST (UTC+02:00)	Morel (yellow card) 33'; Dobrovoljc (yellow card) 76'; Alvir 83', (yellow card) 84'; Majer 90+1'	Report (in Slovene)	Kocić (yellow card) 47'	Stadium: Domžale Sports Park; Attendance: 800; Referee: Darjan Kovačič

17 September 2016 9	Celje	2–1	Domžale	Celje
16:00 CEST (UTC+02:00)	I. Hadžić 25'; Podlogar (yellow card) 69', (goal) 90+2'; Vidmajer (yellow card) 72'	Report (in Slovene)	Horvat (yellow card) 57'; Dobrovoljc 74'; Širok (yellow card) 85'	Stadium: Arena Petrol; Attendance: 700; Referee: Slavko Vinčić

21 September 2016 10	Radomlje	0–5	Domžale	Domžale
18:15 CEST (UTC+02:00)	Kovjenič (yellow card) 3'; Rems (yellow card) 32'; Karamatič (yellow card) 68'; Jazbec (yellow card) 70'	Report (in Slovene)	Alvir 13', 29'; Matjašič 20'; Horvat (yellow card) 40'; Žinko (yellow card) 46'; Balkovec 68'; Širok 77'	Stadium: Domžale Sports Park; Attendance: 500; Referee: Rade Obrenović

24 September 2016 11	Domžale	5–0	Krško	Domžale
18:15 CEST (UTC+02:00)	Alvir 3'; Repas (yellow card) 5', (goal) 25'; Širok (yellow card) 8'; Vuk 28', 53'; Matjašič 64'	Report (in Slovene)	Jurečič (yellow card) 24'; Šturm (yellow card) 47'	Stadium: Domžale Sports Park; Attendance: 600; Referee: Alen Borošak

1 October 2016 12	Maribor	3–1	Domžale	Maribor
20:15 CEST (UTC+02:00)	Tavares 51', 56'; Zahović 90+1'	Report (in Slovene)	Horvat 8'; Matjašič (yellow card) 21'; Dobrovoljc (yellow card) 33'; Halilović (yellow card) 74'; Širok (red card) 90+6'	Stadium: Ljudski vrt Attendance: 4,000; Referee: Damir Skomina

15 October 2016 13	Domžale	3–1	Rudar	Domžale
17:00 CEST (UTC+02:00)	Alvir (yellow card) 6'; Balkovec (yellow card) 12'; Žinko (yellow card) 27'; Halilović (yellow card) 30', (goal) 73'; Repas 46'; Vuk 56'	Report (in Slovene)	Grgić (yellow card) 49'; Zec (yellow card) 51'; Vručina (yellow card) 70'; Mary (yellow card) 89'; Glavina 90+1'	Stadium: Domžale Sports Park; Attendance: 400; Referee: Slavko Vinčić

22 October 2016 14	Koper	1–3	Domžale	Koper
18:00 CEST (UTC+02:00)	Pekuson 2'; Teijo (yellow card) 86'	Report (in Slovene)	Dobrovoljc 39', 60'; Majer (yellow card) 43'; Horvat 45'; Matjašič (yellow card) 64'	Stadium: Bonifika Stadium; Attendance: 500; Referee: Matej Jug

29 October 2016 15	Olimpija	1–0	Domžale	Ljubljana
20:15 CET (UTC+01:00)	Miškić (yellow card) 9'; Kirm 58'; Zajc (yellow card) 84'; Bajrič (yellow card) 87'	Report (in Slovene)	Balkovec (yellow card) 32'; Dobrovoljc (yellow card) 35'; Alvir (yellow card) 68'	Stadium: Stožice Stadium; Attendance: 3,500; Referee: Dragoslav Perić

5 November 2016 16	Domžale	5–0	Gorica	Domžale
18:00 CET (UTC+01:00)	Horvat 22'; Alvir 30', 34', 90+2' (pen.); Žinko (yellow card) 37'; Vuk 56'	Report (in Slovene)	Boben (yellow card) 90+2'; Kotnik (yellow card) 90+2'	Stadium: Domžale Sports Park; Attendance: 500; Referee: Vojko Goričan

20 November 2016 17	Aluminij	0–4	Domžale	Kidričevo
14:00 CET (UTC+01:00)	Srdić (yellow card) 23'; Krljanović (yellow card) 88'	Report (in Slovene)	Kocić 6' (o.g.); Vuk 56'; Mance 62'; Dobrovoljc 70'	Stadium: Kidričevo SPorts Park; Attendance: 200; Referee: Slavko Vinčić

26 November 2016 18	Domžale	2–1	Celje	Domžale
16:00 CET (UTC+01:00)	Vetrih 18' , (yellow card) 49'; Vuk 50'; Husmani (yellow card) 86'	Report (in Slovene)	Džinić (yellow card) 26'; D. Hadžić (yellow card) 52'; Rahmanović (yellow card) 63'; I. Hadžić (yellow card) 72'; Kous (yellow card) 89'	Stadium: Domžale Sports Park; Attendance: 800; Referee: Nejc Kajtazović

30 November 2016 19	Domžale	0–2	Radomlje	Domžale
18:00 CET (UTC+01:00)		Report (in Slovene)	Lidjan (yellow card) 50'; Janković 55'; Balić (yellow card) 65'; Nunić 89'	Stadium: Domžale Sports Park; Attendance: 300; Referee: Darjan Kovačič

4 December 2016 20	Krško	0–0	Domžale	Krško
14:00 CET (UTC+01:00)	Gorenc (yellow card) 56'; Sadiković (yellow card) 57'; Vokić (yellow card) 70'	Report (in Slovene)	Horvat (yellow card) 3'; Blažič (yellow card) 26'; Vetrih (yellow card) 54'; Širok (yellow card) 85'	Stadium: Matija Gubec Stadium; Attendance: 400; Referee: Andrej Žnidaršič

10 December 2016 21	Domžale	3–2	Maribor	Domžale
16:55 CET (UTC+01:00)	Vetrih 12', 74'; Blažič 32'	Report (in Slovene)	Zahović 6' (pen.), 43'; Pihler (yellow card) 38'; Vrhovec (yellow card) 60'; Šme (yellow card) 62'; Šuler (yellow card) 89'	Stadium: Sports Park; Attendance: 1,700; Referee: Roberto Ponis

25 February 2017 22	Rudar Velenje	1–1	Domžale	Velenje
16:00 CET (UTC+01:00)	Lotrič (yellow card) 32'; Zec (yellow card) 49'; Kašnik (yellow card) 77'; Glavina 90+4'	Report	Balkovec 49'; Franjić (yellow card) 59'; Volarič (yellow card) 62'; Vetrih (yellow card) 69'; Husmani (yellow card) 75'; Ožbolt (yellow card) 90+3'	Stadium: Ob Jezeru City Stadium; Attendance: 400; Referee: Bojan Mertik

4 March 2017 23	Domžale	0–1	Koper	Domžale
17:00 CET (UTC+01:00)	Žužek (yellow card) 22'; Vetrih (yellow card) 54'	Report	Blažič 37' (o.g.); Križman (yellow card) 90'	Stadium: Sports Park; Attendance: 500; Referee: Andrej Žnidaršič

12 March 2017 24	Domžale	1–0	Olimpija Ljubljana	Domžale
16:55 CET (UTC+01:00)	Repas 9'; Volarič (yellow card) 76'; Žužek (yellow card) 90+3'	Report	Kirm (yellow card) 52'	Stadium: Sports Park; Attendance: 3,500; Referee: Rade Obrenović

=== Cup ===
==== Round of 16 ====
Win Draw Loss Fixtures

13 September 2016 2	Tolmin	1–4 (a.e.t.)	Domžale	Tolmin
16:00 CEST (UTC+02:00)	Kos (yellow card) 4'; Kavčič 24'; Šturm (yellow card) 88'	Report	Vuk 5' (pen.); Volarič (yellow card) 29'; Vetrih (yellow card) 40'; Brachi (yellow card) 44', (goal) 107'; Bratanović 100'; Matjašič 115'	Stadium: Brajda Sports Park; Attendance: 300; Referee: Roman Glažar

==== Quarter-finals ====
19 October 2016 First leg	Krško	0–2	Domžale	Krško
18:00 CEST (UTC+02:00)	Bučar (yellow card) 36'; Vuklišević (yellow card) 55'	Report	Volarič 15', 30'; Širok (yellow card) 25'; Alvir (yellow card) 29'	Stadium: Matija Gubec; Attendance: 450; Referee: Roberto Ponis

25 October 2016 Second leg	Domžale	2–1 (4–1 agg.)	Krško	Domžale
17:15 CEST (UTC+02:00)	Bratanović 20'; Majer (yellow card) 36', (goal) 58'	Report	Haljeta 90'	Stadium: Domžale Sports Park; Attendance: 300; Referee: Alen Borošak

==== Semi-finals ====
5 April 2017 First leg	Domžale	v	Krka	Domžale
--:-- CEST (UTC+02:00)				Stadium: Domžale Sports Park

12 April 2017 Second leg	Krka	v	Domžale	Novo Mesto
--:-- CEST (UTC+02:00)				Stadium: Portoval

=== UEFA Europa League ===
==== First qualifying round ====
Win Draw Loss

30 June 2016 First leg	Domžale (Slovenia)	3–1	(Andorra) Lusitanos	Domžale
20:00 CEST (UTC+02:00)	Luizão 5', (yellow card) 62'; Carlos Acosta (yellow card) 41'	Report	Dobrovoljc 11'; Trajkovski (yellow card) 16'; Horić 26'; Črnic 43'	Stadium: Sports Park; Attendance: 1,000; Referee: Orkhan Mammadov (Azerbaijan)

7 July 2016 Second leg	Lusitanos (Andorra)	1–2 (2–5 agg.)	(Slovenia) Domžale	Andorra la Vella
20:30 CEST (UTC+02:00)	Majer 5'; Morel 42'	Report	Luizão 18'	Stadium: Estadi Comunal; Attendance: 500; Referee: Stanislav Todorov (Bulgaria)

==== Second qualifying round ====
14 July 2016 First leg	Shakhtyor Soligorsk (Belarus)	1–1	(Slovenia) Domžale	Salihorsk
19:30 CEST (UTC+02:00)	Ignjatijević 35'; Asipenka (yellow card) 36'; Yanushkeivich (yellow card) 69'	Report	Trajkovski (yellow card) 3', (goal) 52'; Majer (yellow card) 15'; Črnic (yellow card) 50'; Repas (yellow card) 89'	Stadium: Stroitel Stadium; Attendance: 2,100; Referee: Dumitru Muntean (Moldova)

21 July 2016 Second leg	Domžale (Slovenia)	2–1 (3–2 agg.)	(Belarus) Shakhtyor Soligorsk	Domžale
20:30 CEST (UTC+02:00)	Alvir 35'; Majer 69'; Dobrovoljc (yellow card) 80'	Report	Starhorodskiy; Laptsew 61'	Stadium: Sports Park; Attendance: 1,800; Referee: Alain Bieri (Switzerland)

==== Third qualifying round ====
28 July 2016 First leg	Domžale (Slovenia)	2–1	(England) West Ham United	Ljubljana
20:45 CEST (UTC+02:00)	Črnic 11' (pen.), 49'; Alvir (yellow card) 13'; Horvat (yellow card) 56'	Report	Nordtveit (yellow card) 11'; Noble 18' (pen.)	Stadium: Stožice Stadium (Note: Domžale played their third qualifying round home match at Stožice Stadium, Ljubljana, instead of their regular stadium Sports Park, Domžale.); Attendance: 8,458; Referee: Mete Kalkavan (Turkey)

4 August 2016 Second leg	West Ham United (England)	3–0 (4–2 agg.)	(Slovenia) Domžale	London
20:45 CEST (UTC+02:00)	Kouyaté 8', 25'; Antonio (yellow card) 42'; Feghouli 81', (yellow card) 82'; Valencia (yellow card) 89'	Report	Črnic (yellow card) 4'; Balkovec (yellow card) 39'; Horić (yellow card) 47'	Stadium: Olympic Stadium; Attendance: 53,914; Referee: Fredy Fautrel (France)

== Statistics ==
=== Goalscorers ===
Slovenian PrvaLiga

8 goals

- (Slovenia) Slobodan Vuk
- (Croatia) Marko Alvir

4 goals

- (Slovenia) Gaber Dobrovoljc

3 goals

- (Slovenia) Amedej Vetrih
- (Brazil) Juninho
- (Slovenia) Lucas Mario Horvat

2 goals

- (Slovenia) Jure Balkovec
- (Slovenia) Jure Matjašič
- (Slovenia) Jan Repas
- (Croatia) Antonio Mance
- (France) Benjamin Morel

1 goal

- (Slovenia) Matija Širok
- (Slovenia) Denis Halilović
- (Slovenia) Miha Blažič
- (Slovenia) Žan Majer
- (Slovenia) Elvis Bratanović

Slovenian Football Cup

2 goals

- (Slovenia) Elvis Bratanović
- (Slovenia) Luka Volarič

1 goal

- (Slovenia) Slobodan Vuk
- (Spain) Álvaro Brachi
- (Slovenia) Jure Matjašič
- (Slovenia) Žan Majer

UEFA Europa League

3 goals

- (Slovenia) Matic Črnic

2 goals

- (Slovenia) Žan Majer

1 goal

- (Slovenia) Dejan Trajkovski
- (Croatia) Marko Alvir
- (Slovenia) Gaber Dobrovoljc
- (Bosnia and Herzegovina) Kenan Horić
- (France) Benjamin Morel

== See also ==
- 2016–17 Slovenian PrvaLiga
- 2016–17 Slovenian Football Cup
- 2016–17 UEFA Europa League
