= 2017 Slovenian Football Cup final =

- Event: 2016–17 Slovenian Football Cup
Domžale	Olimpija
1	0
- Date: 31 May 2017
- Venue: Bonifika Stadium, Koper
- Referee: Slavko Vinčić
- Attendance: 3,230

The 2017 Slovenian Football Cup final was the final match of the 2016–17 Slovenian Football Cup to decide the winner of the 26th edition of the Slovenian Football Cup, Slovenia's top knockout tournament. It was played on 31 May 2017 at Bonifika Stadium in Koper and was won by Domžale, who defeated Olimpija Ljubljana, winning their second cup title.

== Background ==
The final was played between Domžale and Olimpija Ljubljana, both competing in the Slovenian PrvaLiga. This was the first time that Domžale and Olimpija met in the cup final. Domžale previously competed in two finals, winning the competition once, when they defeated Maribor in the 2010–11 edition. Olimpija never competed in the cup final since the club's establishment in 2005.

== Road to the final ==
Note: In all results below, the score of the finalist is given first.

Domžale				Round	Olimpija Ljubljana			
Opponent	Result			Knockout phase	Opponent	Result		
N/A	N/A			First round	N/A	N/A		
Tolmin	4–1 (a.e.t.) (A)			Round of 16	Turnišče	2–0 (A)		
Opponent	Agg.	1st leg	2nd leg	Knockout phase	Opponent	Agg.	1st leg	2nd leg
Krško	4–1	2–0 (A)	2–1 (H)	Quarter-finals	Aluminij	6–2	2–1 (H)	4–1 (A)
Krka	4–0	2–0 (H)	2–0 (A)	Semi-finals	Maribor	3–2	2–1 (H)	1–1 (A)

== Match details ==
31 May 2017
20:30 CEST

Domžale	1–0	Olimpija
Dobrovoljc 62'	Report

Bonifika, Koper
Attendance: 3,230
Referee: Slavko Vinčić

Domžale	Olimpija

DOMŽALE:
GK	1	(Slovenia) Dejan Milić (c)
DF	17	(Slovenia) Matija Širok
DF	25	(Slovenia) Miha Blažič
DF	27	(Slovenia) Gaber Dobrovoljc	(yellow card) 7'
DF	29	(Slovenia) Jure Balkovec	(yellow card) 83'
MF	90	(North Macedonia) Zeni Husmani
MF	30	(Croatia) Petar Franjić	(substituted off) 79'
MF	37	(Slovenia) Žan Majer
MF	4	(Slovenia) Amedej Vetrih	(yellow card) 90+3'
MF	15	(Slovenia) Jan Repas	(substituted off) 87'
FW	7	(Slovenia) Ivan Firer	(yellow card) 79'
Substitutes:
GK	60	(Slovenia) Kristjan Matošević
DF	6	(Slovenia) Rok Elsner
DF	33	(Slovenia) Matija Rom
MF	5	(Slovenia) Luka Volarič	(substituted in) 79'
MF	13	(Slovenia) Žan Žužek
MF	70	(Slovenia) Luka Žinko
FW	92	(Slovenia) Elvis Bratanović	(substituted in) 87'
Manager:
(Slovenia) Simon Rožman

OLIMPIJA:
GK	13	(Slovenia) Rok Vodišek
DF	2	(Slovenia) Denis Klinar	(yellow card) 57'
DF	27	(Slovenia) Aris Zarifović	(yellow card) 90+3'
DF	32	(Slovenia) Nemanja Mitrović (c)	(red card) 90+3'
DF	44	(Croatia) Dino Štiglec
MF	21	(Italy) Kingsley Boateng	(yellow card) 13'	(substituted off) 51'
MF	88	(Croatia) Danijel Miškić	(yellow card) 64'
MF	6	(Romania) Alexandru Crețu	(yellow card) 10' (yellow-red card) 56'
MF	17	(Slovenia) Andraž Kirm	(yellow card) 52'	(substituted off) 77'
FW	26	(Croatia) Leon Benko	(yellow card) 72'
FW	28	(Ghana) Abass Issah		(substituted off) 61'
Substitutes:
GK	41	(Slovenia) Nejc Vidmar
DF	30	(Slovenia) Branko Ilić
DF	33	(Slovenia) Kenan Bajrić	(substituted in) 61'
MF	16	(Portugal) Ricardo Alves
MF	18	(Slovenia) Jakob Novak
FW	10	(Sierra Leone) Julius Wobay	(substituted in) 51'
FW	11	(Nigeria) Nathan Oduwa	(substituted in) 77'
Manager:
(Slovenia) Safet Hadžić

Assistant referees:
Tomaž Klančnik
Andraž Kovačič
Additional assistant referees:
Rade Obrenović
Roberto Ponis
Fourth official:
Matej Jug
Delegate:
Jože Tomšič

2016–17 Slovenian Cup
Winners
Domžale
2nd title

== See also ==
- 2016–17 Slovenian Football Cup
- 2016–17 Slovenian PrvaLiga
