= List of Slovenian football transfers winter 2016–17 =

This is a list of Slovenian football transfers for the winter transfer window. Only moves from Slovenian PrvaLiga are listed. The winter transfer window in Slovenia began on 15 January 2017 and closed on 16 February 2017. Players without a club may join at any time, clubs may sign players on loan at any time.

== Slovenian PrvaLiga ==
=== Players in ===
Club	Date	Pos.	Player	Moving from	Type	Transfer fee	Source
Olimpija	20 December 2016	MF	(North Macedonia) Daniel Avramovski	(Serbia) Red Star Belgrade	Transfer	Free	
Olimpija	30 December 2016	MF	(Romania) Alexandru Crețu	(Romania) Politehnica Iași	Transfer	€100,000	
Olimpija	9 January 2017	MF	(Italy) Kingsley Boateng	(Italy) Bari 1908	Transfer	Undisclosed	
Olimpija		FW	(Ghana) Abass Issah	(Ghana) Asokwa Deportivo	Transfer	Free	
Olimpija	10 January 2017	DF	(Croatia) Dino Štiglec	(Croatia) Slaven Belupo	Transfer	Undisclosed	
Koper	11 January 2017	GK	(Slovenia) Igor Nenezić	Free agent	Transfer	Free	
Koper	11 January 2017	FW	(Sweden) Darko Lukanović	Free agent	Transfer	Free	
Koper	19 January 2017	DF	(Croatia) Frane Ikić	(Croatia) Rijeka	Transfer	Free	
Koper	19 January 2017	MF	(Montenegro) Anel Topuzović	(Croatia) Lokomotiva	Transfer	Free	
Gorica	20 January 2017	FW	(Nigeria) Donatus Edafe	(Nigeria) Mighty Jets	Transfer	Free	
Radomlje	21 January 2017	MF	(Bosnia and Herzegovina) Fedor Predragović	Free agent	Transfer	Free	
Celje	21 January 2017	MF	(Bosnia and Herzegovina) Goran Galešić	Free agent	Transfer	Free	
Celje	21 January 2017	MF	(Ukraine) Ihor Koshman	Free agent	Transfer	Free	
Domžale	23 January 2017	MF	(Croatia) Petar Franjić	(Azerbaijan) Gabala	Transfer	Free	
Krško	25 January 2017	DF	(Serbia) Nikola Janković	(Serbia) Čukarički	Transfer	Free	
Gorica	26 January 2017	FW	(Slovenia) Mark Gulič	Adria	Transfer	Free	
Radomlje	27 January 2017	DF	(Croatia) Mirko Kramarić	Free agent	Transfer	Free	
Aluminij	27 January 2017	MF	(Ghana) Derrick Mensah	(Norway) Haugesund	Transfer	Free	
Krško	27 January 2017		(Serbia) Uroš Jovanović	(Serbia) Jedinstvo Ub	Transfer	Free	
Aluminij	28 January 2017	MF	(Croatia) Vedran Mesec	(Croatia) Sesvete	Transfer	Free	
Maribor	28 January 2017	FW	(Slovenia) Gregor Bajde	(Italy) Novara	Loan return	Free	
Aluminij	29 January 2017	MF	(Croatia) Sanin Muminović	(Croatia) Novigrad	Transfer	Free	
Celje	29 January 2017	MF	(Croatia) Lovro Cvek	Aluminij	Transfer	Free	
Aluminij	29 January 2017	GK	(Croatia) Matija Kovačić	Free agent	Transfer	Free	
Aluminij	29 January 2017	FW	(Croatia) Mateo Panadić	Free agent	Transfer	Free	
Domžale	30 January 2017	FW	(Slovenia) Alen Ožbolt	(Germany) Borussia Dortmund II	Loan return	Free	
Maribor	1 February 2017	FW	(Croatia) Tim Kolar	Mura	Transfer	Free	
Domžale	2 February 2017	FW	(Slovenia) Ivan Firer	Free agent	Transfer	Free	
Koper	2 February 2017	MF	(Bosnia and Herzegovina) Nermin Hodžić	(Croatia) Lučko	Transfer	Free	
Olimpija	5 February 2017	DF	(Slovenia) Branko Ilić	(Japan) Urawa Red Diamonds	Transfer	Free	
Koper	5 February 2017	FW	(Croatia) Sandi Križman	(Bosnia and Herzegovina) Željezničar Sarajevo	Transfer	Free	
Celje	6 February 2017	FW	(Serbia) Luka Belić	(England) West Ham United	Transfer	Undisclosed	
Krško	6 February 2017	MF	(Croatia) Tonći Mujan	(Croatia) Hajduk Split	Transfer	Undisclosed	
Koper	6 February 2017	MF	(Greece) Theofanis Tzandaris	(Greece) Olympiacos	Loan	Undisclosed	
Krško	7 February 2017	FW	(Croatia) Nikola Gatarić	Brežice 1919	Transfer	Free	
Radomlje	7 February 2017	DF	(Slovenia) Leo Ejup	Olimpija	Loan	Free	
Radomlje	8 February 2017	MF	(Slovenia) Mika Mario Rokavec	Free agent	Transfer	Free	
Olimpija	8 February 2017	MF	(Slovenia) Rok Baskera	Krško	Transfer	Free	
Koper	9 February 2017	MF	(Croatia) Antonio Rosandić	(Croatia) Lučko	Transfer	Free	
Olimpija	10 February 2017	FW	(Montenegro) Filip Vorotović	(Serbia) Teleoptik	Transfer	Undisclosed	
Krško	10 February 2017	MF	(Croatia) Rok Nakić		Transfer	Free	
Olimpija	13 February 2017	DF	(Slovenia) David Lukanc		Transfer	Free	
Celje	13 February 2017	DF	(Bosnia and Herzegovina) Tomislav Barišić	(Croatia) Rudeš	Transfer	Free	
Celje	13 February 2017	DF	(New Zealand) Adam Mitchell	(Serbia) Red Star Belgrade	Transfer	Free	
Koper	13 February 2017	MF	(Slovenia) Robi Gajšek	Ankaran	Transfer	Free	
Aluminij	14 February 2017	MF	(Slovenia) Alen Krajnc		Transfer	Free	
Olimpija	14 February 2017	MF	(Nigeria) Nathan Oduwa	(England) Tottenham Hotspur	Transfer	Undisclosed	
Koper	16 February 2017	DF	(Slovenia) Domen Potočnik	Bravo	Transfer	Free	
Radomlje	16 February 2017	FW	(North Macedonia) Dorian Babunski	Olimpija	Loan	Free	
Gorica	16 February 2017	FW	(Croatia) Andrija Filipović	(Italy) Siena	Transfer	Free	

=== Players out ===
Club	Date	Pos.	Player	Moving to	Type	Transfer fee	Source
Domžale	15 December 2016	GK	(France) Axel Maraval		Mutual agreement	Free	
Maribor	19 December 2016	DF	(Slovenia) Erik Janža	(Czech Republic) Viktoria Plzeň	Transfer	Undisclosed	
Rudar Velenje	20 December 2016	FW	(Croatia) Mate Eterović	Domžale	Loan end	Free	
Olimpija	21 December 2016	DF	(Slovenia) Dejan Kelhar	(Turkey) Sivasspor	Loan	Undisclosed	
Krško	23 December 2016	DF	(Slovenia) Žiga Jurečič	Domžale	Loan end	Free	
Krško	24 December 2016	MF	(Slovenia) Jure Špiler	Brežice 1919	Mutual agreement	Free	
Krško	24 December 2016	MF	(Slovenia) David Bučar	Brežice 1919	Mutual agreement	Free	
Krško	24 December 2016	MF	(Slovenia) Miha Drnovšek	Krka	Mutual agreement	Free	
Krško	24 December 2016	MF	(Slovenia) Tim Čeh	Krka	Mutual agreement	Free	
Krško	24 December 2016	FW	(Slovenia) Roy Rudonja		Mutual agreement	Free	
Domžale	30 December 2016	MF	(Croatia) Marko Alvir	(Czech Republic) Slavia Prague	Transfer	Undisclosed	
Aluminij	1 January 2017	GK	(Slovenia) Kristian Lipovac		Retired	Free	
Koper	1 January 2017	MF	(Panama) Ricardo Ávila	(Panama) Chorrillo	Loan end	Free	
Domžale	1 January 2017	MF	(Slovenia) Lucas Mario Horvat	(Kazakhstan) Okzhetpes	Transfer	Free	
Domžale	3 January 2017	MF	(Azerbaijan) Samir Masimov		Mutual agreement	Free	
Domžale	4 January 2017	FW	(Slovenia) Slobodan Vuk	(Norway) Tromsø IL	Transfer	Undisclosed	
Radomlje	10 January 2017	FW	(Slovenia) Liridon Osmanaj	(Qatar) Al-Shamal	Transfer	Free	
Olimpija	10 January 2017	GK	(Slovenia) Darko Brljak		Mutual agreement	Free	
Olimpija	10 January 2017	FW	(Slovenia) Semin Omerović		Mutual agreement	Free	
Krško	10 January 2017	MF	(Slovenia) Dejan Vokić	Maribor	Loan end	Free	
Krško	10 January 2017	MF	(Serbia) Ranko Moravac	Maribor	Loan end	Free	
Koper	11 January 2017	GK	(Slovenia) Vasja Simčič		Mutual agreement	Free	
Aluminij	11 January 2017	MF	(Slovenia) Dejan Krljanović		Mutual agreement	Free	
Aluminij	11 January 2017	MF	(Serbia) Aleksandar Srdić		Mutual agreement	Free	
Aluminij	11 January 2017	FW	(Croatia) Toni Petrović		Mutual agreement	Free	
Celje	11 January 2017	MF	(Croatia) Marin Glavaš		Mutual agreement	Free	
Domžale	19 January 2017	DF	(Slovenia) Dejan Trajkovski	(Netherlands) FC Twente	Transfer	Undisclosed	
Olimpija	22 January 2017	MF	(Slovenia) Boris Vidović		Mutual agreement	Free	
Olimpija	25 January 2017	MF	(Slovenia) Miha Zajc	(Italy) Empoli	Transfer	Undisclosed	
Olimpija	25 January 2017	DF	(Slovenia) Antonio Delamea Mlinar	(United States) New England Revolution	Transfer	Undisclosed	
Krško	25 January 2017	DF	(Serbia) Nikola Janković	(Czech Republic) Jablonec	Loan	Free	
Maribor	26 January 2017	MF	(Croatia) Dejan Mezga	(Portugal) Nacional	Transfer	Undisclosed	
Rudar Velenje	26 January 2017	GK	(Serbia) Borivoje Ristić	(Greece) Panserraikos	Loan	Free	
Koper	28 January 2017	DF	(Slovenia) Gregor Sikošek	(Denmark) Brøndby	Transfer	Undisclosed	
Aluminij	29 January 2017	MF	(Croatia) Lovro Cvek	Celje	Transfer	Free	
Olimpija	31 January 2017	FW	(Slovenia) Etien Velikonja	(Turkey) Gençlerbirliği	Transfer	Undisclosed	
Gorica	31 January 2017	MF	(Slovenia) Andrej Kotnik	(Italy) Crotone	Loan	Free	
Maribor	1 February 2017	FW	(Nigeria) Sunny Omoregie	(Israel) Hapoel Kfar Saba	Loan	Undisclosed	
Maribor	1 February 2017	DF	(Slovenia) Sven Karić Šoštarič	(England) Derby County	Transfer	Undisclosed	
Olimpija	7 February 2017	DF	(Slovenia) Leo Ejup	Radomlje	Loan	Free	
Celje	7 February 2017	FW	(Slovenia) Matic Marcius	Drava Ptuj	Loan	Free	
Celje	7 February 2017	FW	(Bosnia and Herzegovina) Adnan Bašić	Drava Ptuj	Loan	Free	
Celje	7 February 2017	FW	(Slovenia) Tim Obrez	Ivančna Gorica	Loan	Free	
Celje	7 February 2017	MF	(Slovenia) Matic Mlakar		Mutual agreement	Free	
Olimpija	8 February 2017	DF	(Slovenia) Aljaž Krefl	(Serbia) Spartak Subotica	Loan	Free	
Krško	8 February 2017	MF	(Slovenia) Rok Baskera	Olimpija	Transfer	Free	
Gorica	8 February 2017	FW	(Slovenia) Sandi Arčon	(Poland) Górnik Zabrze	Transfer	Undisclosed	
Domžale	8 February 2017	FW	(Croatia) Antonio Mance	(Slovakia) Trenčín	Transfer	Undisclosed	
Olimpija	13 February 2017	DF	(Slovenia) David Lukanc	Ankaran	Loan	Free	
Radomlje	14 February 2017	MF	(Slovenia) Tomaž Avbelj	Dob	Loan	Free	
Koper	14 February 2017	FW	(Slovenia) Jaka Štromajer	Ankaran	Loan	Free	
Koper	14 February 2017	MF	(Slovenia) Robi Gajšek	Ankaran	Loan	Free	
Olimpija	15 February 2017	MF	(Slovenia) Darijan Matić	Mura	Loan	Free	
Maribor	16 February 2017	MF	(Slovenia) Amir Dervišević	Veržej	Loan	Free	
Maribor	16 February 2017	MF	(Slovenia) Dejan Vokić	Veržej	Loan	Free	
Maribor	16 February 2017	FW	(Slovenia) Bian Paul Šauperl	Veržej	Transfer	Free	
Olimpija	16 February 2017	FW	(North Macedonia) Dorian Babunski	Radomlje	Loan	Free	
Olimpija	16 February 2017	DF	(Slovenia) Adnan Hajdarević	Zarica Kranj	Loan	Free	
Gorica	16 February 2017	FW	(Italy) Gianluca Franciosi	Brda	Loan	Free	
Gorica	16 February 2017	FW	(Slovenia) Mark Gulič	Brda	Loan	Free	
Gorica	16 February 2017	FW	(United States) Sachem Wilson		Mutual agreement	Free	
Radomlje	16 February 2017	DF	(Slovenia) Tadej Rems	Zarica Kranj	Transfer	Free	
