= 2016–17 NK Krško season =

NK Krško
2016–17 season
- President: Boštjan Blažinčič
- Head Coach: Tomaž Petrovič
- Stadium: Matija Gubec Stadium
- Slovenian League: 8th
- Slovenian Cup: Quarter-finals
- Average home league attendance: 961
Home colours	Away colours

The 2016–17 season will be Krško's 2nd season in the Slovenian PrvaLiga, Slovenian top division, since the league was created in 1991. Krško will compete in Slovenian PrvaLiga and Slovenian Football Cup.

== Players ==
As of 3 July 2016.

Note: Flags indicate national team as defined under FIFA eligibility rules; some limited exceptions apply. Players may hold more than one non-FIFA nationality.

No.	Pos.	Nation	Player
1	GK	SLO	Marko Zalokar
3	DF	SLO	Aleš Kožar
6	DF	SLO	Jure Špiler
8	MF	SLO	Žiga Jurečič
12	DF	SLO	Gregor Sikošek
13	GK	SLO	Jan Račič
15	MF	SLO	Dejan Urbanč
16	DF	SLO	Damjan Vuklišević
17	MF	CRO	Luka Štefanac
19	MF	SLO	Miha Drnovšek (captain)

No.	Pos.	Nation	Player
22	DF	CRO	Marko Perković
23	MF	SLO	Igor Blažinčič
33	FW	SLO	Dejan Rusič
90	FW	CRO	Petar Petranić
97	MF	SLO	Martin Kramarič
99	MF	SLO	Benjamin Levak
—	DF	CRO	Tin Martić
—	MF	SLO	Marko Felja
—	FW	SLO	David Bučar

== Pre-season and friendlies ==
=== Summer ===
25 June 2016 1	Zagreb (Croatia)	1 – 1	Krško (Slovenia)	Zagreb, Croatia
18:00 CEST (UTC+02:00)		Report (in Slovene)	Dušak

30 June 2016 2	Krško	3 – 0	Promo team	Čatež ob Savi
18:00 CEST (UTC+02:00)	Jurečič; Špiler; Kramarič	Report (in Slovene)

2 July 2016 3	Stal (Ukraine)	0 – 0	(Slovenia) Krško	Unterschützen, Austria
18:00 CEST (UTC+02:00)		[Report (in Slovene)]

4/5 July 2016 4	Krško	v	TBD	Krško
18:00 CEST (UTC+02:00)		[Report (in Slovene)]		Stadium: Matija Gubec Stadium

7 July 2016 5	Krško	v	Brežice	Krško
18:00 CEST (UTC+02:00)		[Report (in Slovene)]		Stadium: Matija Gubec Stadium

9 July 2016 6	Istra 1961 (Croatia)	v	(Slovenia) Krško	Kranj
18:00 CEST (UTC+02:00)		[Report (in Slovene)]

== Competitions ==
=== Overall ===
Competition	Started round	Final position / round	First match	Last match
PrvaLiga	Pre-season		16 July 2016	27 May 2017
Cup	First round		17 August 2016	

Source: Competitions

=== Overview ===
Competition	Record							
Competition	G	W	D	L	GF	GA	GD	Win %
PrvaLiga	0	0	0	0	0	0	+0	—
Cup	0	0	0	0	0	0	+0	—
Total	0	0	0	0	0	0	+0	—

Source: Competitions

=== PrvaLiga ===
==== League table ====
Pos	Team	Pld	W	D	L	GF	GA	GD	Pts	Qualification or relegation
6	Koper (R)	36	12	14	10	43	40	+3	50	Relegation to fourth tier (Note: Koper did not get a competition licence and was thus relegated to the fourth division.)
7	Rudar Velenje	36	10	11	15	49	53	−4	41	
8	Krško	36	8	15	13	39	50	−11	39	
9	Aluminij	36	9	11	16	38	52	−14	38	
10	Radomlje (R)	36	1	10	25	23	80	−57	13	Relegation to Slovenian Second League

Source: PrvaLiga (in Slovene), Soccerway
Rules for classification: 1) Points; 2) Head-to-head points; 3) Head-to-head goal difference; 4) Head-to-head away goals scored; 5) Goal difference; 6) Goals scored; 7) Away goals scored; 8) Fairplay ranking; 9) Draw.
(R) Relegated

==== Results summary ====
Overall								Home						Away					
Pld	W	D	L	GF	GA	GD	Pts	W	D	L	GF	GA	GD	W	D	L	GF	GA	GD
36	8	15	13	39	50	−11	39	4	8	6	18	19	−1	4	7	7	21	31	−10

Last updated: 27 May 2017.
Source: Competitive matches

==== Results by round ====
Round	1	2	3	4	5	6	7	8	9	10	11	12	13	14	15	16	17	18	19	20	21	22	23	24	25	26	27	28	29	30	31	32	33	34	35	36
Ground	A	H	A	H	A	H	A	A	H	H	A	H	A	H	A	H	H	A	A	H	A	H	A	H	A	A	H	H	A	H	A	H	A	H	H	A
Result	D	D	L	W	L	W	D	L	L	W	L	L	D	D	W	D	D	L	D	D	D	L	D	L	W	W	D	L	L	L	D	D	W	W	D	L
Position	5	7	8	7	8	6	7	8	8	7	8	8	8	8	8	8	8	8	8	8	8	8	8	8	8	8	8	8	8	8	9	9	9	8	8	8

Updated to match(es) played on 27 May 2017. Source: Competitive matches
A = Away; H = Home; W = Win; D = Draw; L = Loss

==== Matches ====
Win Draw Loss

16 July 2016 1	Rudar Velenje	v	Krško	Velenje
--:-- CEST (UTC+02:00)		[Report (in Slovene)]		Stadium: Ob Jezeru City Stadium

=== Cup ===
==== First round ====
Win Draw Loss

17 August 2016 First round	Dravograd	3 - 4	Krško	Dravograd
16:00 CEST (UTC+02:00)	Aljoša Gluhovič 60' (pen.) 75'; Davor Rogina (yellow card) 61'; Andrej Hudin 69'	Summary	Dangubić 17' 43'; Robert Pušaver (yellow card) 29'; Baskera 76'; Ibrahim Mensah 80'	Stadium: Dravograd Sports Centre; Attendance: 400; Referee: (Slovenia) Darjan Kovačič

13 September 2016 Second round	Krško	2 - 2 (a.e.t.) (3 - 1 p)	Celje	Krško
18:00 CEST (UTC+02:00)	Džinić 9' (o.g.); Ibrahim Mensah (yellow card) 32'; Robert Pušaver (yellow card) 41'; Kramarič (yellow card) 85'; Marko Zalokar (yellow card) 92'; Žiga Jurečič (yellow card) 96'; Dangubić 120'	Summary	Džinić (yellow card) 27'; Rahmanović 48' 97'; Hadžić (yellow card) 67'; Volaš (yellow card) 92' (yellow-red card)	Stadium: Matija Gubec Stadium; Attendance: 500; Referee: (Slovenia) Darjan Kovačič

19 October 2016 Quarter Final First Leg	Krško	0 - 2	Domžale	Krško
18:00 CEST (UTC+02:00)	David Bučar (yellow card) 36'; Vuklišević (yellow card) 55'	Summary	Luka Volarič 15' 30'; Širok (yellow card) 25'; Marko Alvir (yellow card) 29'	Stadium: Matija Gubec Stadium; Attendance: 450; Referee: (Slovenia) Roberto Ponis

25 October 2016 Quarter Final Second Leg	Domžale	2 - 1 (4 - 1 agg.)	Krško	Domžale
17:15 CEST (UTC+02:00)	Bratanović 20'; Majer (yellow card) 36' (goal) 58'	Summary	Nermin Haljeta 90'	Stadium: Domžale Sports Park; Attendance: 300; Referee: (Slovenia) Alen Borošak

== Statistics ==
=== Squad statistics ===
No.	Pos.	Player	Total			PrvaLiga			Cup	
No.	Pos.	Player	Goal	Yellow card	Red card	Goal	Yellow card	Red card	Goal	Yellow card

== See also ==
- 2016–17 Slovenian PrvaLiga
- 2016–17 Slovenian Football Cup
