= Tadej =

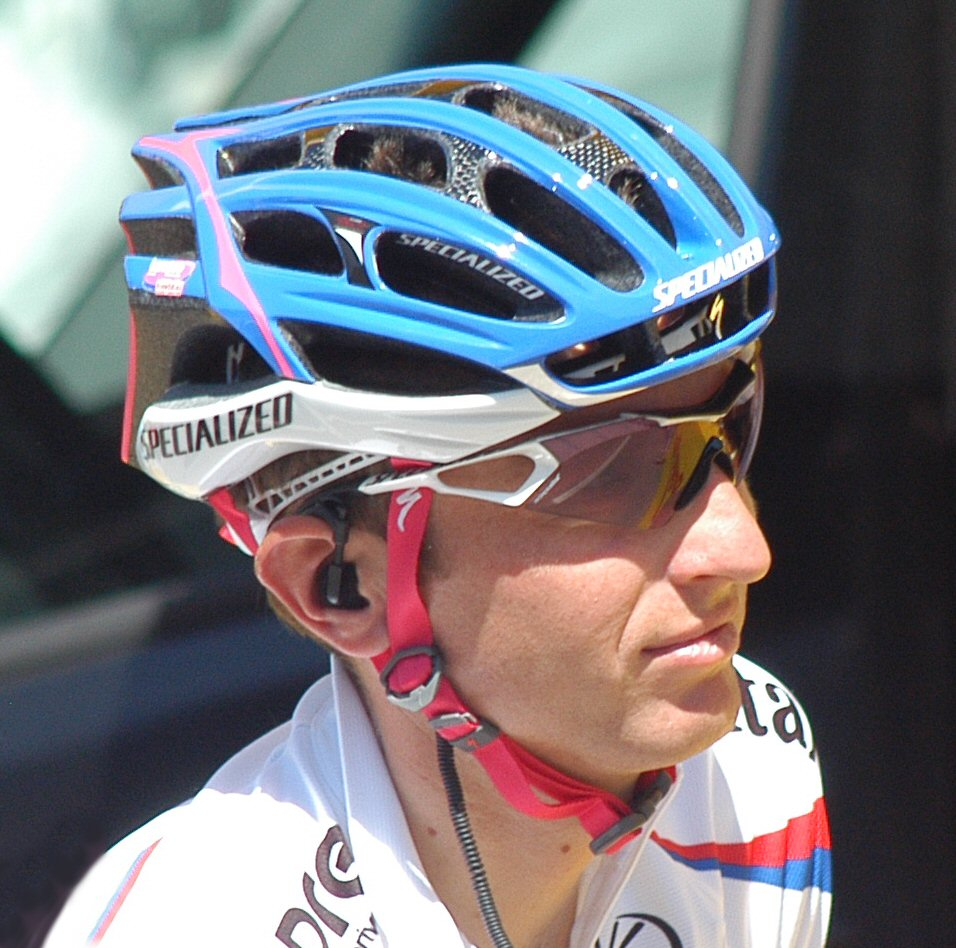
Tadej Valjavec, Tour de France 2007

Tadej is a masculine Slovenian and Sorbian given name. Notable people with the name include:

- Tadej Apatič (born 1987), Slovenian footballer
- Tadej Ferme (born 1991), Slovenian basketball player
- Tadej Golob (born 1967), Slovenian mountain climber and writer
- Tadej Matijašić (born 1994), Slovenian handball player
- Tadej Mazej (born 1998), Slovenian handballer
- Tadej Pogačar (born 1998), Slovenian cyclist
- Tadej Rems (born 1993), Slovenian footballer
- Tadej Trdina (born 1988), Slovenian footballer
- Tadej Valjavec (born 1977), Slovenian cyclist
- Tadej Vidmajer (born 1992), Slovenian footballer
- Tadej Žagar-Knez (born 1991), Slovenian footballer
- Tadej Govekar (born 2008), Slovenian rapper

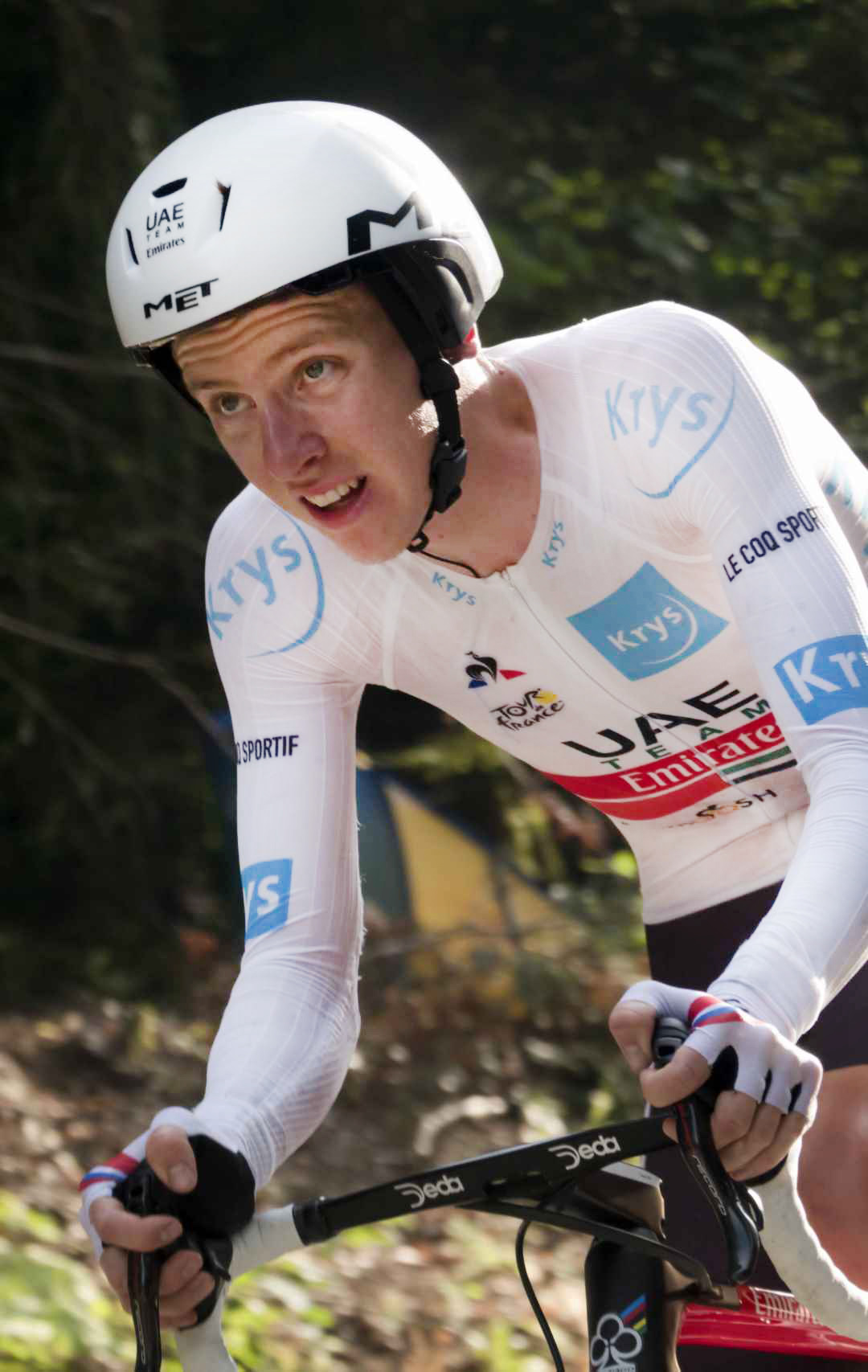
Tadej Pogačar, 2020

== See also ==
- Thaddeus
