= 2016–17 Slovenian Football Cup =

Tournament details
- Country: Slovenia
- Teams: 28

Final positions
- Champions: Domžale (2nd title)
- Runners-up: Olimpija Ljubljana

Tournament statistics
- Matches played: 33
- Goals scored: 106 (3.21 per match)
- Attendance: 33,380 (1,012 per match)
- Top goal scorer: Leon Benko (four goals)

The 2016–17 Slovenian Football Cup was the 26th edition of the Slovenian Football Cup, Slovenia's football knockout competition. Maribor were the defending champions, having won their ninth cup title in the 2015–16 edition.

== Competition format ==
Round	Draw date	Fixtures	Clubs	Format details
First round	24 June 2016	12	24 → 12	18 clubs that have qualified through MNZ Regional Cups + 6 clubs from the 2015–16 PrvaLiga that didn't qualify for UEFA competitions entered at this stage and were drawn into 12 pairs. Teams that have qualified from the same regional cup could not be drawn against each other. The twelve winners were decided over one leg, with extra time and penalties if scores were level. Lower-level teams were the hosts. If both teams from a pair were from the same level, the home team was determined by the draw.
Round of 16	19 August 2016	8	12+4 → 8	12 first round winners were joined by four 2015–16 PrvaLiga teams that qualified for UEFA competitions, and were drawn into 8 pairs. Teams that have qualified from the same regional cup could not be drawn against each other. The eight winners were decided over one leg, with extra time and penalties if scores were level. Lower-level teams were the hosts. If both teams from a pair were from the same level, the home team was determined by the draw.
Quarter-finals	19 September 2016	4	8 → 4	8 teams were drawn into 4 pairs. The four winners were decided over two legs on home and away basis with away goals rule being used. In case of a tie, extra time and penalties were used.
Semi-finals	7 November 2016	2	4 → 2	4 teams were drawn into 2 pairs. The two winners were decided over two legs on home and away basis with away goals rule being used. In case of a tie, extra time and penalties were used.
Final	N/A	1	2 → 1	Winner was decided in a single game at Bonifika Stadium. Extra time and penalties would be used if the scores would be level. The winners have qualified for the 2017–18 UEFA Europa League first qualifying round.

== Qualified teams ==
=== 2015–16 Slovenian PrvaLiga members ===
- Celje
- Domžale
- Gorica
- Koper
- Krka
- Krško
- Maribor
- Olimpija
- Rudar Velenje
- Zavrč

=== Qualified through MNZ Regional Cups ===
- 2015–16 MNZ Celje Cup: Brežice and Šmarje pri Jelšah
- 2015–16 MNZ Koper Cup: Jadran Dekani and Postojna
- 2015–16 MNZG-Kranj Cup: Triglav Kranj and Žiri
- 2015–16 MNZ Lendava Cup: Nafta 1903 and Turnišče
- 2015–16 MNZ Ljubljana Cup: Dob and Radomlje
- 2015–16 MNZ Maribor Cup: Lenart and Dravograd
- 2015–16 MNZ Murska Sobota Cup: Beltinci and Bogojina
- 2015–16 MNZ Nova Gorica Cup: Brda and Tolmin
- 2015–16 MNZ Ptuj Cup: Aluminij and Videm

== Participating teams sorted by league ==
2016–17 Slovenian PrvaLiga	2016–17 Slovenian Second League	2016–17 Slovenian Third League	2016–17 MNZ League
Aluminij; Celje; Domžale; Gorica; Koper; Krško; Maribor ^{TH}; Olimpija; Radomlje; Rudar Velenje	Brda; Brežice; Dob; Krka; Triglav Kranj; Zavrč	Beltinci; Bogojina; Dravograd; Jadran Dekani; Lenart; Nafta 1903; Postojna; Šmarje pri Jelšah; Tolmin; Turnišče; Videm	Žiri (Div IV)

== Bracket ==
First round
Postojna	0
Radomlje	8
Nafta Lendava (a.e.t.)	4
Zavrč	2
Turnišče	1
Brda	0
Šmarje pri Jelšah	1
Koper	5
Beltinci	0
Aluminij	2
Bogojina	3
Tolmin	5
Dravograd	3
Krško	4
Žiri	0
Celje	5
Jadran Dekani	3
Videm	0
Lenart	0
Rudar Velenje	4
Dob	1
Triglav Kranj	0
Krka	3
Brežice	0

Round of 16
Radomlje	0
Maribor	2
Nafta Lendava	1
Gorica	3
Turnišče	0
Olimpija	2
Koper	0 (3)
Aluminij (pen.)	0 (4)
Tolmin	1
Domžale (a.e.t.)	4
Krško (pen.)	2 (3)
Celje	2 (1)
Jadran Dekani	1
Rudar Velenje	2
Dob	0
Krka	1

Quarter-finals
Gorica	1	0	1
Maribor (a.)	1	0	1
Olimpija	2	4	6
Aluminij	1	1	2
Krško	0	1	1
Domžale	2	2	4
Rudar Velenje	0	2	2
Krka	2	2	4

Semi-finals
Olimpija	2	1	3
Maribor	1	1	2
Domžale	2	2	4
Krka	0	0	0

Final
Domžale	1
Olimpija	0

== First round ==
Domžale, Gorica, Maribor and Olimpija joined the competition in the Second round (round of 16).

17 August 2016	Jadran Dekani	3–0	Videm	Dekani
16:00 CEST	Terčič 36'; Stepančič 52'; Reja 64'	Report		Stadium: Dekani Sports Park; Attendance: 100; Referee: Asmir Sagrković

17 August 2016	Postojna	0–8	Radomlje	Postojna
16:00 CEST		Report	Gajič 37', 45'; Šipek 42'; Avbelj 57'; Kumer 78'; Nunić 84'; Cerar 87'; Jakovljević 90'	Stadium: Postojna Sports Park; Attendance: 100; Referee: Marko Podgoršek

17 August 2016	Lenart	0–4	Rudar Velenje	Lenart
16:00 CEST		Report	Grgić 21'; Vručina 62' (90); Krcić 72'	Stadium: ŠRC Polena; Attendance: 200; Referee: Bojan Mertik

17 August 2016	Dravograd	3–4	Krško	Dravograd
16:00 CEST	Gluhovič 60' (pen.), 75'; Hudin 69'	Report	Dangubić 17', 43'; Baskera 76'; Mensah 80'	Stadium: Dravograd Sports Centre; Attendance: 400; Referee: Darjan Kovačič

17 August 2016	Žiri	0–5	Celje	Žiri
16:00 CEST		Report	Podlogar 7', 66'; Džinić 20'; Lovrečič 32'; Glavaš 40'	Stadium: Polje Stadium; Attendance: 250; Referee: Rade Obrenović

17 August 2016	Šmarje pri Jelšah	1–5	Koper	Šmarje pri Jelšah
16:00 CEST	Šoštarič 68'	Report	Štromajer 2', 30'; Valencia 40'; Datković 73'; Vekić 83'	Stadium: Šmarje pri Jelšah Sports Park; Attendance: 350; Referee: Boris Tošeski

17 August 2016	Turnišče	1–0	Brda	Turnišče
16:00 CEST	Pavel 17'	Report		Stadium: Turnišče Stadium; Attendance: 100; Referee: Roman Glažar

17 August 2016	Dob	1–0	Triglav Kranj	Dob
16:00 CEST	Grvala 10'	Report		Stadium: Dob Sports Park; Attendance: 100; Referee: Alen Borošak

17 August 2016	Bogojina	3–5	Tolmin	Bogojina
16:00 CEST	Ivanič 48', 81'; Ošlaj 70'	Report	Zornik 14'; Kavčič 23'; Kucalović 39'; Jarc 39'; Bratina 54'	Stadium: ŠRC Bogojina; Attendance: 150; Referee: Iztok Gornjak

17 August 2016	Krka	3–0	Brežice	Novo Mesto
16:00 CEST	Trščinar 20'; Kambič 87'; Gliha 90+1'	Report		Stadium: Portoval; Attendance: 150; Referee: Mihael Antič

17 August 2016	Beltinci	0–2	Aluminij	Beltinci
16:00 CEST		Report	Kocić 43'; Škoflek 87'	Stadium: Beltinci Sports Park; Attendance: 300; Referee: Dejan Vivod

17 August 2016	Nafta 1903	4–2 (a.e.t.)	Zavrč	Lendava
18:00 CEST	Koprivica 34'; Lotrič 68'; Zagorec 99'; Kovač 104'	Report	Potočnik 35'; Krajnc 52'	Stadium: Lendava Sports Park; Attendance: 500; Referee: Tadej Mežnar

== Round of 16 ==
The draw for the round of 16 was held on 19 August 2016 at the Football Association of Slovenia headquarters in Kranj. In this phase of the competition the 12 clubs who advanced from the first round were joined by Domžale, Gorica, Maribor and Olimpija.

6 September 2016	Jadran Dekani	1–2	Rudar Velenje	Dekani
16:00 CEST	Stepančič 55'	Report	Dodlek 67', 90+1'	Stadium: Dekani Sports Park; Attendance: 250; Referee: Asmir Sagrković

7 September 2016	Dob	0–1	Krka	Dob
16:00 CEST		Report	Brekalo 64'	Stadium: Dob Sports Park; Attendance: 200; Referee: Bojan Mertik

7 September 2016	Turnišče	0–2	Olimpija	Turnišče
16:00 CEST		Report	Eleke 35'; Benko 86'	Stadium: Turnišče Stadium; Attendance: 600; Referee: Andrej Žnidaršič

13 September 2016	Tolmin	1–4 (a.e.t.)	Domžale	Tolmin
16:00 CEST	Kavčič 24'	Report	Vuk 5' (pen.); Bratanović 100'; Brachi 107'; Matjašič 115'	Stadium: Brajda Sports Park; Attendance: 300; Referee: Roman Glažar

13 September 2016	Krško	2–2 (a.e.t.) (3–1 p)	Celje	Krško
18:00 CEST	Džinić 9' (o.g.); Dangubić 120+1'	Report	Rahmanović 48', 97'	Stadium: Matija Gubec Stadium; Attendance: 500; Referee: Darjan Kovačič
	Penalties
			(penalty missed) Travner; (penalty missed) Džinić; (penalty scored) Vidmajer; (penalty missed) Kous

14 September 2016	Radomlje	0–2	Maribor	Domžale
18:00 CEST		Report	Vršič 74'; Kabha 90+3'	Stadium: Domžale Sports Park; Attendance: 500; Referee: Vojko Goričan

14 September 2016	Koper	0–0 (a.e.t.) (3–4 p)	Aluminij	Koper
18:00 CEST		Report		Stadium: Bonifika Stadium; Attendance: 400; Referee: Alen Borošak
	Penalties
	Ibričić (penalty scored); Belima (penalty scored); Datković (penalty scored); Pekuson (penalty missed); Muslimović (penalty missed)		(penalty missed) Krljanović; (penalty scored) Bizjak; (penalty scored) Kramer; (penalty scored) Škoflek; (penalty scored) Jakšić

15 September 2016	Nafta 1903	1–3	Gorica	Lendava
18:00 CEST	Kapić 39' (o.g.)	Report	Burgić 40'; Kotnik 71'; Franciosi 90+3'	Stadium: Lendava Sports Park; Attendance: 800; Referee: Roman Glažar

== Quarter-finals ==
=== First leg ===
18 October 2016	Rudar Velenje	0–2	Krka	Velenje
18:00 CEST		Report	Vukadin 56'; Kambič 89'	Stadium: Ob Jezeru; Attendance: 200; Referee: Asmir Sagrković

18 October 2016	Olimpija	2–1	Aluminij	Ljubljana
18:00 CEST	Wobay 28'; Velikonja 54' (pen.)	Report	Škoflek 10'	Stadium: Stožice; Attendance: 1,500; Referee: Miran Bukovec

19 October 2016	Gorica	1–1	Maribor	Nova Gorica
18:00 CEST	Kotnik 58'	Report	Zahović 44'	Stadium: Nova Gorica Sports Park; Attendance: 700; Referee: Dragoslav Perić

19 October 2016	Krško	0–2	Domžale	Krško
18:00 CEST		Report	Volarič 15', 30'	Stadium: Matija Gubec; Attendance: 450; Referee: Roberto Ponis

=== Second leg ===
25 October 2016	Domžale	2–1 (4–1 agg.)	Krško	Domžale
17:15 CEST	Bratanović 20'; Majer 58'	Report	Haljeta 90'	Stadium: Domžale Sports Park; Attendance: 300; Referee: Alen Borošak

26 October 2016	Krka	2–2 (4–2 agg.)	Rudar Velenje	Novo Mesto
14:00 CEST	Kostanjšek 45', 57'	Report	Mary 12'; Glavina 27'	Stadium: Portoval; Attendance: 200; Referee: Mitja Žganec

26 October 2016	Aluminij	1–4 (2–6 agg.)	Olimpija	Kidričevo
14:00 CEST	Srdić 56'	Report	Zajc 10'; Velikonja 11'; Benko 60'; Kirm 78'	Stadium: Kidričevo Sports Park; Attendance: 400; Referee: Bojan Mertik

26 October 2016	Maribor	0–0 (1a–1 agg.)	Gorica	Maribor
17:15 CEST		Report		Stadium: Ljudski vrt Attendance: 3,000; Referee: Damir Skomina

== Semi-finals ==
=== First leg ===
4 April 2017	Domžale	2–0	Krka	Domžale
17:15 CEST	Firer 58'; Batrović 83'	Report		Stadium: Domžale Sports Park; Attendance: 500; Referee: Bojan Mertik

5 April 2017	Olimpija	2–1	Maribor	Ljubljana
20:15 CEST	Benko 81', 85'	Report	Vršič 48'	Stadium: Stožice; Attendance: 6,000; Referee: Matej Jug

=== Second leg ===
11 April 2017	Krka	0–2 (0–4 agg.)	Domžale	Novo Mesto
16:30 CEST		Report	Žužek 30'; Majer 53'	Stadium: Portoval; Attendance: 150; Referee: Slavko Vinčić

12 April 2017	Maribor	1–1 (2–3 agg.)	Olimpija	Maribor
17:15 CEST	Hotić 71'	Report	Crețu 32'	Stadium: Ljudski vrt Attendance: 10,500; Referee: Damir Skomina

== Final ==
31 May 2017
20:30 CEST

Domžale	1–0	Olimpija
Dobrovoljc 62'	Report

Bonifika, Koper
Attendance: 3,230
Referee: Slavko Vinčić
