= 2016–17 Slovenian PrvaLiga =

Slovenian PrvaLiga
- Season: 2016–17
- Dates: 16 July 2016 – 27 May 2017
- Champions: Maribor (14th title)
- Relegated: Radomlje; Koper
- Champions League: Maribor
- Europa League: Gorica; Olimpija; Domžale (cup winners)
- Matches: 180
- Goals: 463 (2.57 per match)
- Best player: Dare Vršič
- Top goalscorer: John Mary (17 goals)
- Biggest home win: Domžale 5–0 Krško; Domžale 5–0 Gorica
- Biggest away win: Radomlje 0–5 Domžale
- Highest scoring: Domžale 5–3 Krško
- Longest winning run: 5 matches Olimpija and Maribor
- Longest unbeaten run: 14 matches Maribor
- Longest winless run: 18 matches Radomlje
- Longest losing run: 6 matches Radomlje
- Highest attendance: 13,770; Olimpija 1–3 Maribor
- Lowest attendance: 100; Aluminij 0–0 Gorica
- Total attendance: 248,750
- Average attendance: 1,381

The 2016–17 Slovenian PrvaLiga (also known as the Prva liga Telekom Slovenije for sponsorship reasons) was the 26th edition of the Slovenian PrvaLiga since its establishment in 1991. The season began on 16 July 2016 and ended on 27 May 2017. The official fixture schedule was released on 24 June 2016.

== Competition format ==
Each team played 36 matches (18 home and 18 away). Teams played four matches against each other (2 home and 2 away).

== Teams ==
Location of teams in the 2016–17 Slovenian PrvaLiga

=== Promotion and relegation (pre-season) ===
A total of ten teams contested the league, including eight from the 2015–16 Slovenian PrvaLiga and two promoted from the 2015–16 Slovenian Second League. Radomlje won direct promotion as winners of the 2015–16 Slovenian Second League. They replaced Krka in the top division, who placed at the bottom of the 2015–16 Slovenian PrvaLiga table. This was the second season for Radomlje in top flight, having previously been a member during the 2014–15 Slovenian PrvaLiga season.

The PrvaLiga play-off for the final spot in the top division was played between Zavrč and Aluminij. Zavrč won the play-off fixture with the score 4–3 on aggregate, but the club was unsuccessful in obtaining a licence to play in the top division for the next season, due to financial reasons. The Football Association of Slovenia then invited Aluminij to take their spot and the side from Kidričevo accepted. Aluminij had previously played in the PrvaLiga during the 2012–13 season.

=== Stadiums and locations ===
Team	Location	Stadium	Capacity^{1}	2015–16 position
Aluminij	Kidričevo	Aluminij Sports Park	532	2. SNL, 2nd
Celje	Celje	Arena Petrol	13,059	5th
Domžale	Domžale	Domžale Sports Park	3,100	3rd
Gorica	Nova Gorica	Nova Gorica Sports Park	3,100	4th
Koper	Koper	Bonifika	4,047	8th
Krško	Krško	Matija Gubec	1,470	6th
Maribor	Maribor	Ljudski vrt	12,702	Runners-up
Olimpija Ljubljana	Ljubljana	Stožice	16,038	Champions
Radomlje	Radomlje	Domžale Sports Park^{2}	3,100	2. SNL, 1st
Rudar Velenje	Velenje	Ob Jezeru	1,864	7th

^{1}Seating capacity only. Some stadiums also have standing areas.
^{2}Radomlje played its home games in Domžale, because their home venue did not meet PrvaLiga stadium criteria.

=== Personnel and kits ===
Team	Manager	Captain	Kit manufacturer	Shirt sponsor
Aluminij	(Croatia) Slobodan Grubor	(Slovenia) Matic Vrbanec	Zeus Sport	Talum
Celje	(Croatia) Igor Jovićević	(Slovenia) Jure Travner	Legea	Cinkarna
Domžale	(Slovenia) Simon Rožman	(Slovenia) Luka Žinko	Joma	Tark
Gorica	(Slovenia) Miran Srebrnič	(Slovenia) Alen Jogan	Erreà	GEN-I
Koper	(Croatia) Igor Pamić	(Croatia) Toni Datković	Nike	Port of Koper
Krško	(Slovenia) Rok Zorko	(Slovenia) Marko Zalokar	Erima	GEN, Kostak
Maribor	(Slovenia) Darko Milanič	(Brazil) Marcos Tavares	Adidas	Zavarovalnica Sava, Nova KBM, Radio City
Olimpija Ljubljana	(Slovenia) Safet Hadžić	(Slovenia) Branko Ilić	Nike	Telekom Slovenije
Radomlje	(Bosnia and Herzegovina) Adnan Zildžović	(Slovenia) Igor Barukčič	Joma	Kalcer
Rudar Velenje	(Serbia) Vanja Radinović	(Slovenia) David Kašnik	Joma	None

=== Managerial changes ===
Team	Outgoing manager	Date of vacancy	Position in table	Incoming manager	Date of appointment
Rudar Velenje	Ramiz Smajlović (interim)	15 June 2016	Pre-season	Milovan Rajevac	15 June 2016
Rudar Velenje	Milovan Rajevac	27 June 2016	Pre-season	Slobodan Krčmarević	30 June 2016
Radomlje	Dejan Djuranović	16 August 2016	10th	Jani Žilnik	16 August 2016
Olimpija Ljubljana	Rodolfo Vanoli	31 August 2016	2nd	Luka Elsner	2 September 2016
Domžale	Luka Elsner	2 September 2016	5th	Simon Rožman	2 September 2016
Koper	Milan Obradović	26 September 2016	5th	Oliver Bogatinov (interim)	28 September 2016
Koper	Oliver Bogatinov	5 October 2016	6th	Igor Pamić	5 October 2016
Celje	Robert Pevnik	6 October 2016	5th	Igor Jovićević	6 October 2016
Radomlje	Jani Žilnik	14 November 2016	10th	David McDonough (interim)	14 November 2016
Rudar Velenje	Slobodan Krčmarević	1 December 2016	6th	Branko Čavić (interim)	1 December 2016
Aluminij	Bojan Špehonja	21 December 2016	9th	Slobodan Grubor	3 January 2017
Radomlje	David McDonough	4 January 2017	10th	Robert Pevnik	4 January 2017
Rudar Velenje	Branko Čavić	9 January 2017	6th	Vanja Radinović	9 January 2017
Radomlje	Robert Pevnik	20 February 2017	10th	Adnan Zildžović	20 February 2017
Olimpija Ljubljana	Luka Elsner	9 March 2017	2nd	Marijan Pušnik	9 March 2017
Krško	Tomaž Petrovič	13 March 2017	8th	Rok Zorko	13 March 2017
Olimpija Ljubljana	Marijan Pušnik	3 April 2017	3rd	Safet Hadžić	4 April 2017

== League table ==
=== Standings ===
Pos	Team	Pld	W	D	L	GF	GA	GD	Pts	Qualification or relegation
1	Maribor (C)	36	21	10	5	63	30	+33	73	Qualification for the Champions League second qualifying round
2	Gorica	36	16	12	8	48	39	+9	60 (Note: Gorica ahead of Olimpija on head-to-head record: Olimpija–Gorica 1–0, Gorica–Olimpija 1–1, Olimpija–Gorica 1–2, Gorica–Olimpija 1–0)	Qualification for the Europa League first qualifying round (Note: Domžale qualified for Europa League first qualifying round by winning the 2016–17 Slovenian Football Cup.)
3	Olimpija Ljubljana	36	17	9	10	49	35	+14	60	Qualification for the Europa League first qualifying round
4	Domžale	36	16	8	12	63	45	+18	56	Qualification for the Europa League first qualifying round
5	Celje	36	15	10	11	48	39	+9	55	
6	Koper (R)	36	12	14	10	43	40	+3	50	Relegation to fourth tier (Note: Koper did not get a competition licence and was thus relegated to the fourth division.)
7	Rudar Velenje	36	10	11	15	49	53	−4	41	
8	Krško	36	8	15	13	39	50	−11	39	
9	Aluminij	36	9	11	16	38	52	−14	38	
10	Radomlje (R)	36	1	10	25	23	80	−57	13	Relegation to Slovenian Second League

Source: PrvaLiga (in Slovene), Soccerway
Rules for classification: 1) Points; 2) Head-to-head points; 3) Head-to-head goal difference; 4) Head-to-head away goals scored; 5) Goal difference; 6) Goals scored; 7) Away goals scored; 8) Fairplay ranking; 9) Draw.
(C) Champions; (R) Relegated

=== Positions by round ===
Key
Final round before the winter break

Team \ Round	1	2	3	4	5	6	7	8	9	10	11	12	13	14	15	16	17	18	19	20	21	22	23	24	25	26	27	28	29	30	31	32	33	34	35	36
Maribor	3	1	2	3	4	5	4	4	2	2	2	2	2	1	2	2	1	1	1	1	1	1	1	1	1	1	1	1	1	1	1	1	1	1	1	1
Gorica	2	4	4	5	3	2	1	2	3	4	4	4	4	5	5	5	5	6	5	5	4	4	5	5	4	4	4	4	4	4	4	4	4	4	2	2
Olimpija	4	2	1	1	2	1	2	1	1	1	1	1	1	2	1	1	2	2	2	2	2	2	2	2	2	2	3	3	3	2	3	3	2	2	3	3
Domžale	1	3	5	2	1	3	5	5	5	3	3	3	3	3	3	3	3	3	3	3	3	3	3	3	3	3	2	2	2	3	2	2	3	3	4	4
Celje	7	5	3	4	5	8	9	7	6	6	6	5	5	4	4	4	4	4	4	4	5	5	4	4	5	5	5	5	5	5	5	5	6	5	5	5
Koper	8	6	7	6	7	4	3	3	4	5	5	6	6	6	6	6	6	7	7	6	6	6	6	6	6	6	6	6	6	6	6	6	5	6	6	6
Rudar	6	8	6	8	6	9	6	6	7	8	7	7	7	7	7	7	7	5	6	7	7	7	7	7	7	7	7	7	7	7	7	7	7	7	7	7
Krško	5	7	8	7	8	6	7	8	8	7	8	8	8	8	8	8	8	8	8	8	8	8	8	8	8	8	8	8	8	8	9	9	9	8	8	8
Aluminij	9	9	9	9	9	7	8	9	9	9	9	9	9	9	9	9	9	9	9	9	9	9	9	9	9	9	9	9	9	9	8	8	8	9	9	9
Radomlje	10	10	10	10	10	10	10	10	10	10	10	10	10	10	10	10	10	10	10	10	10	10	10	10	10	10	10	10	10	10	10	10	10	10	10	10

Source: PrvaLiga official website

Leader / Qualification to UEFA Champions League
Qualification to UEFA Europa League
Relegation play-off
Relegation to 2. SNL

== Results ==
=== First half of the season ===
Home \ Away	ALU	CEL	DOM	GOR	KOP	KRŠ	MAR	OLI	RAD	RUD
Aluminij		2–4	0–4	0–0	0–0	3–0	0–0	0–3	2–1	0–3
Celje	1–0		2–1	1–0	1–1	0–3	0–3	0–1	0–0	4–0
Domžale	2–0	2–1		5–0	2–0	5–0	2–2	1–3	2–0	3–1
Gorica	2–0	0–1	3–1		1–1	1–1	2–1	1–1	2–1	1–3
Koper	1–0	2–1	1–3	0–0		1–0	1–2	1–2	3–0	1–4
Krško	2–2	1–0	1–1	1–0	0–0		1–2	1–2	1–1	1–0
Maribor	0–2	2–0	3–1	1–0	1–0	4–0		1–1	4–0	2–0
Olimpija	3–0	1–0	1–0	1–0	0–1	3–1	1–3		2–0	0–2
Radomlje	2–2	0–3	0–5	2–4	1–3	2–2	0–3	0–2		2–2
Rudar	0–0	1–3	0–2	1–2	2–0	1–1	1–1	0–0	2–0	

Source: PrvaLiga (in Slovene)
Legend: Blue = home team win; Yellow = draw; Red = away team win.

=== Second half of the season ===
Home \ Away	ALU	CEL	DOM	GOR	KOP	KRŠ	MAR	OLI	RAD	RUD
Aluminij		2–1	0–0	1–2	2–2	1–1	3–1	2–1	3–1	3–0
Celje	1–0		1–1	1–1	2–2	1–2	1–1	1–1	1–0	1–1
Domžale	2–1	1–4		1–1	0–1	5–3	3–2	1–0	0–2	3–0
Gorica	3–0	1–1	3–1		0–0	0–0	2–4	1–0	1–1	2–1
Koper	1–0	1–1	3–0	0–1		0–2	2–2	1–1	4–1	1–0
Krško	1–1	2–3	0–0	1–2	1–1		1–1	0–1	2–0	1–2
Maribor	4–1	0–2	1–0	2–2	4–0	1–0		1–0	1–0	1–0
Olimpija	1–0	2–1	3–1	1–2	1–1	1–1	0–0		1–1	2–4
Radomlje	0–3	0–1	1–1	1–2	0–4	0–2	1–1	1–4		1–5
Rudar	2–2	1–2	1–1	1–3	2–2	2–2	0–1	4–2	0–0	

Source: PrvaLiga (in Slovene)
Legend: Blue = home team win; Yellow = draw; Red = away team win.

== PrvaLiga play-off ==
The two-legged play-off between Aluminij, the ninth-placed team in PrvaLiga and Ankaran Hrvatini, the third-placed team in the 2. SNL, should have been played in June 2017. However, on 1 June 2017, the Football Association of Slovenia announced that FC Koper did not obtain a competition licence for PrvaLiga. Therefore, the play-offs were not held and both Aluminij and Ankaran Hrvatini secured a place in the 2017–18 PrvaLiga season.

== Season statistics ==
=== Top goalscorers ===
Rank	Player	Team	Goals
1	(Cameroon) John Mary	Rudar Velenje	17
2	(Croatia) Dominik Glavina	Rudar Velenje	16
3	(Slovenia) Luka Zahović	Maribor	15
3	(Slovenia) Dalibor Volaš	Celje	15
5	(Slovenia) Miran Burgič	Gorica	14
6	(Croatia) Filip Dangubić	Krško	13
7	(Slovenia) Milivoje Novaković	Maribor	11
8	(Croatia) Leon Benko	Olimpija	10
9	(Brazil) Marcos Tavares	Maribor	9
9	(Slovenia) Dare Vršič	Maribor	9
9	(Slovenia) Žiga Škoflek	Aluminij	9

Source: PrvaLiga official website

=== Top assists ===
Rank	Player	Team	Assists
1	(Slovenia) Dare Vršič	Maribor	11
2	(Slovenia) Matic Vrbanec	Aluminij	10
3	(Bosnia and Herzegovina) Rifet Kapić	Gorica	7
3	(Slovenia) Jan Repas	Domžale	7
3	(Slovenia) Denis Klinar	Olimpija	7
6	(Slovenia) Matej Podlogar	Celje	6
6	(Slovenia) Jure Balkovec	Domžale	6
6	(Slovenia) Žan Majer	Domžale	6
6	(Croatia) Bojan Vručina	Rudar	6
6	(Croatia) Filip Dangubić	Krško	6
6	(Bosnia and Herzegovina) Senijad Ibričić	Koper	6

Source: PrvaLiga official website

=== Own goals ===
Player	For	Against	Date	Round	Report
(Slovenia) Miha Blažič	Domžale	Maribor	31 July 2016	3	Report
(Slovenia) Marko Šuler	Maribor	Gorica	13 August 2016	5	Report
(Slovenia) Janez Pišek	Celje	Maribor	28 August 2016	7	Report
(Slovenia) Klemen Šturm	Krško	Olimpija	2 October 2016	12	Report
(Slovenia) Milan Kocić	Aluminij	Domžale	20 November 2016	17	Report
(Slovenia) Aleksandar Zukić	Radomlje	Olimpija	4 December 2016	20	Report
(Slovenia) Elvedin Džinić	Celje	Koper	26 February 2017	22	Report
(Slovenia) Miha Blažič	Domžale	Koper	4 March 2017	23	Report
(Slovenia) Gaber Dobrovoljc	Domžale	Gorica	17 May 2017	34	Report
(Slovenia) Adis Hodžić	Maribor	Celje	17 May 2017	34	Report
(Slovenia) Marko Krajcer	Krško	Koper	21 May 2017	35	Report

=== Hat-tricks ===
Player	For	Against	Result	Date	Round	Report
(Croatia) Dominik Glavina	Rudar	Koper	4–1 (A)	1 October 2016	12	Report
(Croatia) Marko Alvir	Domžale	Gorica	5–0 (H)	5 November 2016	16	Report
(Cameroon) John Mary	Rudar	Radomlje	1–5 (H)	2 April 2017	27	Report

=== Discipline and Fairplay ===
Pos	Team	Yellow card	Red card	Fairplay points
1	Aluminij	65	4	173
2	Gorica	70	1	178
3	Domžale	74	2	196
4	Koper	82	1	206
5	Celje	79	5	207
6	Rudar	89	2	220
7	Radomlje	83	5	221
8	Krško	84	2	237
9	Olimpija	72	2	295
10	Maribor	67	0	319
Totals		765	24	

=== Attendances ===
Pos	Team	Total	High	Low	Average	Change
1	Maribor	76,000	12,000	1,200	4,222	−0.9%
2	Olimpija	59,370	13,770	600	3,298	−24.2%
3	Domžale	18,650	3,500	150	1,036	+3.3%
4	Celje	18,500	3,500	300	1,028	−12.8%
5	Krško	17,300	1,900	400	961	−25.6%
6	Koper	14,150	2,000	250	786	+3.7%
7	Rudar	13,800	2,000	120	767	−25.4%
8	Gorica	12,180	1,100	250	677	−7.4%
9	Radomlje	9,900	1,200	150	550	+123.6%^{^{1}}
10	Aluminij	8,900	1,500	100	494	+183.9%^{^{1}}
	League total	248,750	13,770	100	1,381	−12.0%

Source: PrvaLiga official website

Note^{1}: Team played the previous season in the Slovenian Second League.

== Awards ==
=== Annual awards ===
PrvaLiga Player of the season

- Dare Vršič

PrvaLiga Goalkeeper of the season

- Jasmin Handanović

PrvaLiga U23 Player of the season

- Luka Zahović

=== PrvaLiga Team of the season ===

Slovenian PrvaLiga Team of the 2016–17 season – SPINS XI.

Player	Team	Position	Ref.
(Slovenia) Jasmin Handanović	Maribor	Goalkeeper	
(Slovenia) Jure Balkovec	Domžale	Defender	
(Slovenia) Marko Šuler	Maribor	Defender	
(Brazil) Rodrigo Defendi	Maribor	Defender	
(Slovenia) Matija Širok	Domžale	Defender	
(Slovenia) Dare Vršič	Maribor	Midfielder	
(Bosnia and Herzegovina) Rifet Kapić	Gorica	Midfielder	
(Bosnia and Herzegovina) Senijad Ibričić	Koper	Midfielder	
(Slovenia) Luka Zahović	Maribor	Forward	
(Croatia) Dominik Glavina	Rudar	Forward	
(Slovenia) Miran Burgić	Gorica	Forward	

== See also ==
- 2016–17 Slovenian Football Cup
- 2016–17 Slovenian Second League
