= Sergei Vinogradov =

Sergei Vinogradov may refer to:

- Sergei Vinogradov (painter) (1869–1938), Russian painter and graphic artist
- Sergei Vinogradov (journalist) (1958–2010), Russian journalist and translator
- Sergei Vinogradov (footballer, born 1971), Russian footballer
- Sergei Vinogradov (footballer, born 1981), Russian footballer
- Sergei Vinogradov (politician) (1907–1970), Russian Ambassador to France and member of the CPSU Central Auditing Commission
- Sergei Vinogradov (director) (born 1965), Russian theatrical director
- Sergei Vinogradov (serial killer) (born 1967), Russian serial killer
