= Bučar =

Bučar is a South Slavic surname found in Slovenia and Croatia. Notable people with the surname include:

- David Bučar (born 1994), Slovene footballer
- France Bučar (1923–2015), Slovene politician
- Franjo Bučar (1866–1946), Croatian writer and sports popularizer
- Jure Bučar (born 1966), Slovene swimmer
