= Rodrigo Defendi =

Brazilian footballer (born 1986)

Personal information
- Date of birth: 16 June 1986 (age 40)
- Place of birth: Ribeirão Preto, Brazil
- Height: 1.90 m (6 ft 3 in)
- Position: Centre back

Youth career
- 2004: Cruzeiro
- 2004–2005: Tottenham Hotspur

Senior career*
Years	Team	Apps	(Gls)
2005–2007	Tottenham Hotspur	0	(0)
2006	→ Udinese (loan)	2	(0)
2006–2007	→ Roma (loan)	0	(0)
2007–2009	Avellino	15	(0)
2010	Palmeiras B	0	(0)
2011	Paraná	14	(1)
2011–2012	Vitória de Guimarães	23	(1)
2013	Botafogo	0	(0)
2014	Vitória	1	(0)
2014–2015	Vitória de Guimarães	7	(0)
2015	Shijiazhuang Ever Bright	3	(0)
2016–2017	Maribor	35	(1)
2017–2019	Aves	21	(3)
2019–2020	Estoril	1	(0)
Total		122	(6)
- * Club domestic league appearances and goals

Rodrigo Defendi (born 16 June 1986) is a Brazilian former professional footballer who played as a centre-back.

== Club career ==
Defendi was first spotted as a 16-year-old by the then Tottenham Hotspur Director of Sport Frank Arnesen. He was the first player signed under the Frank Arnesen and Jacques Santini era at Spurs from Cruzeiro for a fee of £600,000 on July 3, 2004, although he had to wait for his passport to arrive in August for the deal to be officially completed. He failed to make a first team appearance for Tottenham but featured in a number of reserve team matches.

He was deemed surplus to requirements by Tottenham Hotspur manager Martin Jol, as he was first allowed to travel back to Brazil to seek a contract with a new club which proved unsuccessful, before he was farmed out on loan to Udinese Calcio in January 2006. He made two league appearances before leaving for A.S. Roma in August 2006, again on loan. He made an appearance in the Champions League and in the Coppa Italia for the capital club, but didn't manage to play a league game in Serie A.

Defendi returned to Tottenham Hotspur from Roma after his loan period ended. On August 9, 2007 Tottenham announced his departure to the Italian Serie B club Avellino on a permanent transfer.

Defendi became a free agent after the bankruptcy of Avellino and returned to Brazil. He joined the Palmeiras reserves in March 2010.

On 18 May 2011, Defendi signed a contract with Portuguese Primeira Liga side Vitória Guimarães.

On 10 January 2013, after nine years playing in Europe, Defendi was presented by Botafogo, his new side.

On 18 February 2015, Defendi signed a two-year contract with Chinese Super League side Shijiazhuang Ever Bright.

On 27 January 2016, he signed for Maribor in the Slovenian PrvaLiga.

== Career statistics ==
Appearances and goals by club, season and competition
Club	Season	League			State League		National Cup		League Cup		Continental		Other		Total	
Club	Season	Division	Apps	Goals	Apps	Goals	Apps	Goals	Apps	Goals	Apps	Goals	Apps	Goals	Apps	Goals
Udinese (loan)	2005–06	Serie A	2	0	—		2	0	—		—		—		4	0
Roma (loan)	2006–07	Serie A	0	0	—		1	0	—		1	0	0	0	2	0
Avellino	2007–08	Serie B	1	0	—		0	0	—		—		—		1	0
Avellino	2008–09	Serie B	15	0	—		1	0	—		—		—		16	0
Avellino	Total		16	0	—		1	0	—		—		—		17	0
Paraná	2011	Série B	—		14	1	4	1	—		—		—		18	2
Vitória de Guimarães	2011–12	Primeira Liga	13	1	—		0	0	2	0	0	0	0	0	15	1
Vitória de Guimarães	2012–13	Primeira Liga	10	0	—		1	0	0	0	—		—		11	0
Vitória de Guimarães	Total		23	1	—		1	0	2	0	0	0	0	0	26	1
Botafogo	2013	Série A	0	0	2	0	0	0	—		—		—		2	0
Vitória	2014	Série A	1	0	8	0	1	0	—		—		4	0	14	0
Vitória de Guimarães	2014–15	Primeira Liga	7	0	—		1	0	0	0	—		—		8	0
Shijiazhuang Ever Bright	2015	Chinese Super League	3	0	—		1	0	—		—		—		4	0
Maribor	2015–16	Slovenian PrvaLiga	10	1	—		3	0	—		—		—		13	1
Maribor	2016–17	Slovenian PrvaLiga	25	0	—		5	0	—		4	0	—		34	0
Maribor	Total		35	1	—		8	0	—		4	0	—		47	1
Aves	2017–18	Primeira Liga	10	1	—		3	2	0	0	—		—		13	3
Aves	2018–19	Primeira Liga	11	2	—		3	0	3	0	—		0	0	17	2
Aves	Total		21	3	—		6	2	3	0	—		0	0	30	5
Estoril	2019–20	LigaPro	1	0	—		0	0	1	0	—		—		2	0
Career total			109	5	24	1	26	3	6	0	5	0	4	0	174	9

== Honours ==
Roma

- Coppa Italia: 2006–07

Vitória de Guimarães

- Taça de Portugal: 2012–13

Botafogo

- Campeonato Carioca: 2013

Maribor

- Slovenian Championship (1): 2016–17
- Slovenian Cup (1): 2015–16
