= Leandro Teijo =

Argentine footballer

Personal information
- Full name: Leandro Nicolás Teijo
- Date of birth: 27 July 1991 (age 35)
- Place of birth: Almagro, Buenos Aires, Argentina
- Height: 1.76 m (5 ft 9 1/2 in)
- Position: Midfielder

Team information
- Current team: Trapani
- Number: 24

Youth career
- River Plate
- Vélez Sarsfield

Senior career*
Years	Team	Apps	(Gls)
–2011	Vélez Sarsfield		
2011–2012	All Boys		
2012–2014	Racing de Olavarría	38	(0)
2014–2016	Independiente de Neuquén	51	(0)
2016–2017	Koper	15	(0)
2017–2019	Nueva Chicago	32	(0)
2019–2020	Alvarado	10	(0)
2020	Liepāja	9	(1)
2021–2023	Martina	27	(0)
2023–2024	Siracusa	23	(0)
2024–2025	Casarano	28	(0)
2025	Gelbison	12	(0)
2025–2026	Gela	19	(0)
2026–	Trapani	0	(0)
- * Club domestic league appearances and goals as of 28 September 2026

Leandro Nicolás Teijo (born 27 July 1991) is an Argentine footballer playing as a midfielder for Serie D club Trapani.

== Club career ==
Teijo signed for Slovenian side FC Koper in the summer of 2016.

On 23 April 2021, Teijo joined Italian Eccellenza club Martina.

== Career statistics ==
=== Club ===
As of 14 June 2017

Club	Season	League			Cup		Continental		Other		Total	
Club	Season	Division	Apps	Goals	Apps	Goals	Apps	Goals	Apps	Goals	Apps	Goals
Olavarría	2012–13	Torneo Federal A	19	0	3 (Note: Appearances in the Copa Argentina)	0	–		0	0	22	0
Olavarría	2013–14	Torneo Federal A	19	0	1	0	–		0	0	20	0
Olavarría	Total		38	0	4	0	–		0	0	42	0
Independiente de Neuquén	2014	Torneo Federal A	10	0	1	0	–		0	0	11	0
Independiente de Neuquén	2015	Torneo Federal A	28	0	2	0	–		0	0	30	0
Independiente de Neuquén	2016	Torneo Federal A	13	0	0	0	–		0	0	13	0
Independiente de Neuquén	Total		51	0	3	0	–		0	0	54	0
Koper	2016–17	Slovenian PrvaLiga	15	0	1 (Note: Appearances in the Slovenian Football Cup)	0	–		0	0	16	0
Total	Argentina		89	0	7	0	–		0	0	96	0
Total	Slovenia		15	0	1	0	–		0	0	16	0
Total	Career total		104	0	8	0	–		0	0	112	0
