= Miha Blažič (footballer) =

Slovenian footballer (born 1993)

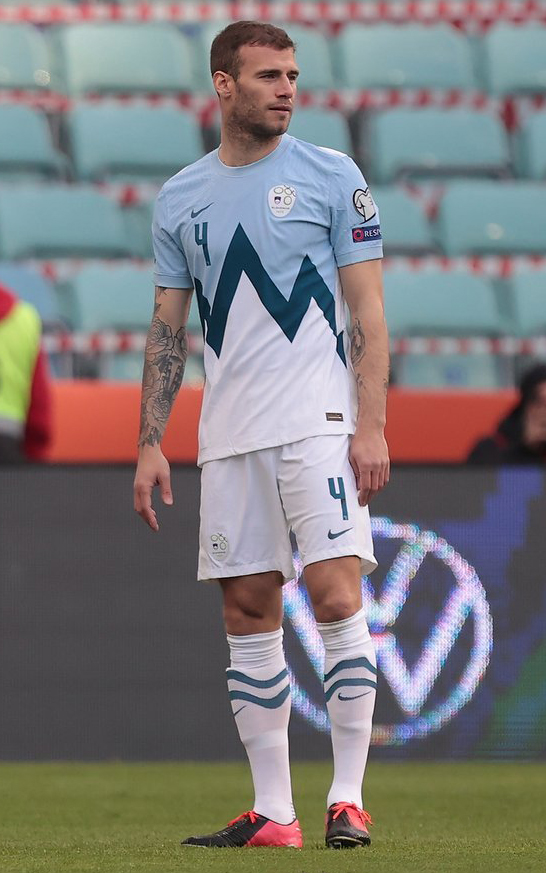
- Blažič with Slovenia in 2021

Personal information
- Date of birth: 8 May 1993 (age 33)
- Place of birth: Koper, Slovenia
- Height: 1.85 m (6 ft 1 in)
- Position: Centre-back

Team information
- Current team: Maribor
- Number: 25

Youth career
- –2011: Koper

Senior career*
| Years | Team | Apps | (Gls) |
| 2011–2015 | Koper | 99 | (2) |
| 2015–2017 | Domžale | 47 | (2) |
| 2017–2022 | Ferencváros | 134 | (12) |
| 2022–2023 | Angers | 24 | (2) |
| 2023–2024 | Lech Poznań | 24 | (1) |
| 2024–2026 | Kalba | 46 | (1) |
| 2026– | Maribor | 16 | (0) |

International career
| 2009 | Slovenia U16 | 2 | (0) |
| 2010 | Slovenia U18 | 4 | (0) |
| 2011–2012 | Slovenia U19 | 9 | (0) |
| 2011–2013 | Slovenia U20 | 4 | (0) |
| 2013 | Slovenia U21 | 7 | (0) |
| 2017 | Slovenia B | 1 | (0) |
| 2018–2024 | Slovenia | 32 | (0) |
- * Club domestic league appearances and goals as of 22 November 2026

Miha Blažič (born 8 May 1993) is a Slovenian professional footballer who plays as a centre-back for Slovenian PrvaLiga club Maribor.

== Club career ==
Blažič signed his first professional contract with Koper at the age of 17.

On 31 August 2017, Blažič signed a three-year deal with Ferencváros. With the club, he won four consecutive Nemzeti Bajnokság I titles, from 2018–19 to 2021–22. He also played in the 2020–21 UEFA Champions League group stage after Ferencváros eliminated Molde in the play-offs.

On 4 June 2022, he joined Ligue 1 club Angers on a three-year contract.

On 6 July 2023, Polish side Lech Poznań announced that Blažič joined the club on a two-year contract.

On 23 September 2024, his transfer to Emirati side Kalba was announced.

== International career ==
Blažič played for all Slovenian youth international levels from under-16 to under-21, with four years as a captain. He debuted for the senior team on 2 June 2018 in a friendly match against Montenegro.

In June 2024, he was selected in Slovenia's squad for UEFA Euro 2024 played in Germany.

== Career statistics ==
As of match played 5 January 2025

Appearances and goals by club, season and competition
| Club | Season | League | | | National cup (Note: Includes Slovenian Cup, Magyar Kupa, Coupe de France, Polish Cup, UAE President's Cup) | | Continental | | Total | |
| Club | Season | Division | Apps | Goals | Apps | Goals | Apps | Goals | Apps | Goals |
|---|---|---|---|---|---|---|---|---|---|---|
| Koper | 2010–11 | 1. SNL | 11 | 0 | 2 | 0 | 0 | 0 | 13 | 0 |
| Koper | 2011–12 | 1. SNL | 21 | 0 | 2 | 1 | 2 (Note: Appearances in UEFA Europa League) | 0 | 25 | 1 |
| Koper | 2012–13 | 1. SNL | 22 | 1 | 2 | 0 | — | | 24 | 1 |
| Koper | 2013–14 | 1. SNL | 29 | 0 | 0 | 0 | — | | 29 | 0 |
| Koper | 2014–15 | 1. SNL | 16 | 1 | 2 | 0 | 4 | 0 | 22 | 1 |
| Koper | 2015–16 | 1. SNL | 0 | 0 | 0 | 0 | 2 | 0 | 2 | 0 |
| Koper | Total | | 99 | 2 | 8 | 1 | 8 | 0 | 115 | 3 |
| Domžale | 2015–16 | 1. SNL | 15 | 1 | 4 | 0 | — | | 19 | 1 |
| Domžale | 2016–17 | 1. SNL | 28 | 1 | 5 | 0 | 1 | 0 | 34 | 1 |
| Domžale | 2017–18 | 1. SNL | 4 | 0 | 0 | 0 | 8 | 0 | 12 | 0 |
| Domžale | Total | | 47 | 2 | 9 | 0 | 9 | 0 | 65 | 2 |
| Ferencváros | 2017–18 | NB I | 24 | 7 | 2 | 0 | 0 | 0 | 26 | 7 |
| Ferencváros | 2018–19 | NB I | 29 | 2 | 5 | 0 | 2 | 0 | 36 | 2 |
| Ferencváros | 2019–20 | NB I | 31 | 3 | 0 | 0 | 14 (Note: Six appearances in UEFA Champions League, eight appearances in UEFA Europa League) | 0 | 45 | 3 |
| Ferencváros | 2020–21 | NB I | 24 | 0 | 1 | 0 | 11 (Note: Appearances in UEFA Champions League) | 0 | 36 | 0 |
| Ferencváros | 2021–22 | NB I | 26 | 0 | 4 | 0 | 14 (Note: Eight appearances and one goal in UEFA Champions League, six appearances in UEFA Europa League) | 1 | 44 | 1 |
| Ferencváros | Total | | 134 | 12 | 12 | 0 | 41 | 1 | 187 | 13 |
| Angers | 2022–23 | Ligue 1 | 24 | 2 | 2 | 1 | — | | 26 | 3 |
| Lech Poznań | 2023–24 | Ekstraklasa | 24 | 1 | 2 | 0 | 4 (Note: Appearances in UEFA Europa Conference League) | 0 | 30 | 1 |
| Kalba | 2024–25 | UAE Pro League | 9 | 0 | 1 | 0 | — | | 10 | 0 |
| Career total | | | 337 | 19 | 34 | 2 | 62 | 1 | 433 | 22 |

== Honours ==
Koper

- Slovenian Cup: 2014–15
- Slovenian Supercup: 2015

Domžale

- Slovenian Cup: 2016–17

Ferencváros

- Nemzeti Bajnokság I: 2018–19, 2019–20, 2020–21, 2021–22
- Magyar Kupa: 2021–22
