= Jure Matjašič =

Slovenian footballer (born 1992)

Personal information
- Date of birth: 31 May 1992 (age 34)
- Place of birth: Maribor, Slovenia
- Height: 1.72 m (5 ft 8 in)
- Position: Winger

Team information
- Current team: RB Halbenrain

Youth career
- –2011: Drava Ptuj

Senior career*
Years	Team	Apps	(Gls)
2010–2011	Drava Ptuj	14	(1)
2011–2016	Zavrč	134	(16)
2016–2018	Domžale	26	(2)
2018	Sacramento Republic	24	(2)
2019–2020	Aluminij	65	(6)
2021	Celje	7	(0)
2021–2022	Aluminij	17	(0)
2023	FC Gleisdorf 09	13	(5)
2023	FC Gratkorn	1	(1)
2023–2025	Rudar Velenje	43	(7)
2025–	RB Halbenrain	0	(0)

International career
2016	Slovenia	1	(0)
2017	Slovenia B	2	(0)
- * Club domestic league appearances and goals as of 22 February 2025

Jure Matjašič (born 31 May 1992) is a Slovenian footballer who plays as a winger for Austrian club RB Halbenrain.
