= Nikola Janković (football) =

Serbian footballer (born 1993)

Personal information
- Full name: Nikola Janković
- Date of birth: 7 June 1993 (age 33)
- Place of birth: Lazarevac, FR Yugoslavia
- Height: 1.75 m (5 ft 9 in)
- Position: Right-back

Team information
- Current team: Voždovac
- Number: 2

Youth career
- Kolubara

Senior career*
| Years | Team | Apps | (Gls) |
| 2011–2012 | Kolubara | 48 | (0) |
| 2013–2016 | Čukarički | 53 | (1) |
| 2017 | Krško | 0 | (0) |
| 2017 | → Jablonec (loan) | 12 | (0) |
| 2017–2019 | Jablonec | 12 | (0) |
| 2019 | Inđija | 4 | (0) |
| 2020 | Zvijezda 09 | 3 | (0) |
| 2020–2022 | Kolubara | 75 | (1) |
| 2023 | Mladost GAT | 16 | (1) |
| 2023–2024 | Kolubara | 24 | (0) |
| 2024- | Voždovac | 62 | (3) |
- * Club domestic league appearances and goals as of 14 May 2026

Nikola Janković (Serbian Cyrillic: Никола Јанковић; born 7 June 1993) is a Serbian professional footballer who plays a right-back for Serbian First League club Voždovac.

== Career statistics ==
| Club | Season | League | | Cup | | Europe | | Other | | Total | |
| Club | Season | Apps | Goals | Apps | Goals | Apps | Goals | Apps | Goals | Apps | Goals |
|---|---|---|---|---|---|---|---|---|---|---|---|
| Kolubara | 2011–12 | 34 | 0 | 1 | 0 | 0 | 0 | 0 | 0 | 35 | 0 |
| Kolubara | 2012–13 | 14 | 0 | 1 | 0 | 0 | 0 | 0 | 0 | 15 | 0 |
| Kolubara | Total | 48 | 0 | 2 | 0 | 0 | 0 | 0 | 0 | 50 | 0 |
| Čukarički | 2012–13 | 8 | 0 | 0 | 0 | 0 | 0 | 0 | 0 | 8 | 0 |
| Čukarički | 2013–14 | 11 | 0 | 2 | 0 | 0 | 0 | 0 | 0 | 13 | 0 |
| Čukarički | 2014–15 | 11 | 0 | 3 | 0 | 2 | 0 | 0 | 0 | 16 | 0 |
| Čukarički | 2015–16 | 14 | 1 | 2 | 0 | 0 | 0 | 0 | 0 | 16 | 1 |
| Čukarički | 2016–17 | 9 | 0 | 1 | 0 | 3 | 0 | 0 | 0 | 13 | 0 |
| Čukarički | Total | 53 | 1 | 8 | 0 | 5 | 0 | 0 | 0 | 66 | 1 |
| Career total | | 101 | 1 | 10 | 0 | 5 | 0 | 0 | 0 | 116 | 1 |

Statistics accurate as of 8 December 2016

== Honours ==
Čukarički

- Serbian Cup: 2014–15
