= Tadej Matijašić =

Slovenian handball player

Personal information
- Nationality: Slovenian
- Born: 7 June 1994 (age 32) Ljubljana, Slovenia
- Height: 1.73 m (5 ft 8 in)

Sport
- Sport: Handball
- Position: Left Wing
- Current club: RD Koper 2013
- Number: 94

Senior clubs
- Years: Team
- 2012–2017: (North Macedonia) RK Metalurg II
- 2015–2019: (North Macedonia) RK Metalurg Skopje
- 2019–: (Slovenia) RD Koper 2013

Tadej Matijašić (born 22 January 1994) is a Slovenian handball player who plays for RD Koper 2013.
