= Jure Balkovec =

Slovenian footballer (born 1994)

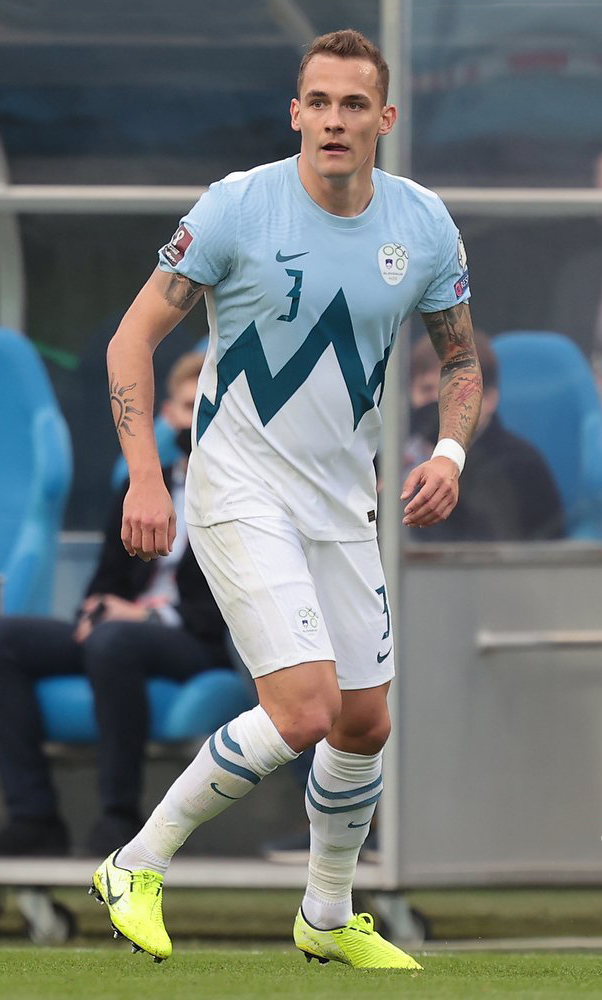
- Balkovec with Slovenia in 2021

Personal information
- Date of birth: 9 September 1994 (age 32)
- Place of birth: Novo Mesto, Slovenia
- Height: 1.85 m (6 ft 1 in)
- Position: Left-back

Team information
- Current team: Omonia
- Number: 29

Youth career
- –2011: Bela Krajina
- 2012: Domžale

Senior career*
Years	Team	Apps	(Gls)
2011	Bela Krajina	11	(0)
2011–2018	Domžale	93	(11)
2014	→ Krka (loan)	4	(0)
2014–2015	→ Radomlje (loan)	29	(0)
2018	Bari	11	(1)
2018–2020	Hellas Verona	17	(0)
2019–2020	→ Empoli (loan)	32	(1)
2020–2022	Fatih Karagümrük	63	(3)
2022–2025	Alanyaspor	82	(8)
2025–2026	Fatih Karagümrük	17	(0)
2026–	Omonia	14	(0)

International career^{‡}
2012	Slovenia U19 (Note: Official UEFA competitive matches only.)	3	(0)
2014–2016	Slovenia U21	8	(0)
2017	Slovenia B	1	(0)
2018–	Slovenia	40	(0)
- * Club domestic league appearances and goals as of 14 June 2026 ‡ National team caps and goals as of 26 September 2026

Jure Balkovec (born 9 September 1994) is a Slovenian professional footballer who plays as a left-back for Cypriot First Division club Omonia and the Slovenia national team.

== Club career ==
In January 2018, Balkovec left Domžale and signed for Italian Serie B outfit Bari, only to move to Hellas Verona after half a year due to Bari's financial collapse.

In September 2020, Balkovec moved to play in Turkey for Fatih Karagümrük. In summer 2022, he joined compatriot Miha Mevlja at fellow Turkish side Alanyaspor.

== International career ==
Balkovec made his debut for Slovenia in an October 2018 Nations League match against Cyprus, coming on as a 58th-minute substitute for Bojan Jokić.

== Career statistics ==
=== Club ===
As of match played on 18 May 2024

Appearances and goals by club, season and competition
Club	Season	League			National cup (Note: Includes Slovenian Cup, Coppa Italia, Turkish Cup)		Continental		Other		Total	
Club	Season	Division	Apps	Goals	Apps	Goals	Apps	Goals	Apps	Goals	Apps	Goals
Bela Krajina	2010–11	Slovenian Second League	11	0	0	0	—		—		11	0
Domžale	2011–12	Slovenian PrvaLiga	12	1	0	0	—		—		12	1
Domžale	2012–13	Slovenian PrvaLiga	22	3	1	0	—		—		23	3
Domžale	2013–14	Slovenian PrvaLiga	4	0	1	0	1 (Note: Appearances in UEFA Europa League)	0	—		6	0
Domžale	2015–16	Slovenian PrvaLiga	11	1	3	0	—		—		14	1
Domžale	2016–17	Slovenian PrvaLiga	30	5	4	0	3	0	—		37	5
Domžale	2017–18	Slovenian PrvaLiga	14	1	0	0	8	2	—		22	3
Domžale	Total		93	11	9	0	12	2	0	0	114	13
Krka (loan)	2013–14	Slovenian PrvaLiga	4	0	0	0	—		—		4	0
Radomlje (loan)	2014–15	Slovenian PrvaLiga	29	0	1	0	—		—		30	0
Bari	2017–18	Serie B	11	1	0	0	—		1 (Note: Appearance in the 2017–18 Serie B promotion play-offs)	0	12	1
Hellas Verona	2018–19	Serie B	17	0	1	0	—		—		18	0
Empoli (loan)	2019–20	Serie B	32	1	2	0	—		—		34	1
Fatih Karagümrük	2020–21	Süper Lig	33	2	0	0	—		—		33	2
Fatih Karagümrük	2021–22	Süper Lig	30	1	3	0	—		—		33	1
Fatih Karagümrük	Total		63	3	3	0	0	0	0	0	66	3
Alanyaspor	2022–23	Süper Lig	29	4	2	0	—		—		31	4
Alanyaspor	2023–24	Süper Lig	28	3	3	1	—		—		31	4
Alanyaspor	Total		57	7	5	1	0	0	0	0	62	8
Career total			317	23	21	1	12	2	1	0	351	26

== Honours ==
Omonia

- Cypriot First Division: 2025–26
