= Slobodan Vuk =

Slovenian footballer

Personal information
- Date of birth: 15 September 1989 (age 37)
- Place of birth: Jajce, SFR Yugoslavia
- Height: 1.80 m (5 ft 11 in)
- Position: Forward

Team information
- Current team: Dob

Youth career
- Domžale
- Kamnik

Senior career*
Years	Team	Apps	(Gls)
2007–2011	Kamnik		
2011–2017	Domžale	120	(37)
2017–2018	Tromsø	19	(2)
2018	→ Domžale (loan)	11	(1)
2018–2023	Domžale	106	(21)
2023–	Dob	23	(29)

International career
2017	Slovenia B	2	(0)
- * Club domestic league appearances and goals as of 28 May 2024

Slobodan Vuk (born 15 September 1989) is a Slovenian footballer who plays as a forward for Dob.

== Personal life ==
His older brother, Goran Vuk, is also a footballer.
