= Tomaž Petrovič =

Slovenian football manager

Personal information
- Full name: Tomaž Petrovič
- Date of birth: 17 April 1979 (age 47)
- Place of birth: Brežice, SFR Yugoslavia

Managerial career
- Years: Team
- 2010–2011: Bravo
- 2011–2012: Interblock
- 2014–2017: Krško
- 2017: Celje
- 2018–2019: Slovenia U15/U16
- 2020: Slovenia U17
- 2021–2022: Maribor U19

Tomaž Petrovič (born 17 April 1979) is a Slovenian football manager.

== Managerial career ==
Petrovič began his coaching career at Olimpija in 2002, coaching various youth selections. In 2006 he joined the newly founded Bravo, where he was director of the academy and youth coach. In 2010, he coached the under-14 selection at the Nike Premier Cup. The same year, he took over the club's senior team, which competed in the Slovenian fourth division in the 2010–11 season.

In June 2011, Petrovič took charge of the Slovenian Second League side Interblock. After one season, he returned to Bravo where he coached the under-18 side. He left Bravo in 2013 after a series of poor results.

Petrovič was the manager of Krško between January 2014 and March 2017. On 12 June 2017, he was appointed manager of Celje. He left the team on 29 August 2017 and was replaced by Dušan Kosič.

Between 2018 and 2020, Petrovič coached various youth selections of the Slovenian national team, including the under-16s and under-17s.

On 3 June 2021, Petrovič was appointed as the head coach of Maribor's under-19 side. He was sacked on 16 October 2022 after a poor start of the season as Maribor were sitting in tenth place in the under-19 league.
