= Matija Širok =

Slovenian footballer

Personal information
- Date of birth: 31 May 1991 (age 35)
- Place of birth: Šempeter pri Gorici, SFR Yugoslavia
- Height: 1.77 m (5 ft 10 in)
- Position: Right-back

Youth career
- –2010: Gorica

Senior career*
Years	Team	Apps	(Gls)
2010–2014	Gorica	124	(4)
2014–2015	Parma	0	(0)
2014–2015	→ Gorica (loan)	24	(1)
2015–2016	Gorica	21	(3)
2016	Jagiellonia Białystok	3	(0)
2016	Jagiellonia Białystok II	5	(1)
2016–2018	Domžale	56	(3)
2018–2020	Pafos	50	(0)
2020–2023	Gorica	70	(0)
Total		353	(12)

International career
2007–2008	Slovenia U17		
2009	Slovenia U19		
2010–2012	Slovenia U21	4	(0)
2017	Slovenia B	2	(0)
- * Club domestic league appearances and goals

Matija Širok (born 31 May 1991) is a Slovenian former professional footballer who played as a right-back.

== Club career ==
On 22 August 2014, Širok signed a two-year contract with Italian Serie A club Parma, but was immediately loaned back to Gorica for the 2014–15 season. He never returned to Parma as the club went bankrupt in 2015. Afterwards, he signed for Gorica as a free agent.

== Honours ==
Gorica

- Slovenian Cup: 2013–14

Domžale

- Slovenian Cup: 2016–17
