= Elvis Bratanović =

Slovenian footballer

Personal information
- Full name: Elvis Bratanović
- Date of birth: 21 August 1992 (age 34)
- Place of birth: Celje, Slovenia
- Height: 1.83 m (6 ft 0 in)
- Position: Striker

Youth career
- –2009: Celje
- 2009–2010: Rudar Velenje

Senior career*
Years	Team	Apps	(Gls)
2009–2013	Rudar Velenje	93	(26)
2014–2017	Teplice	17	(1)
2014–2015	→ Bohemians 1905 (loan)	26	(7)
2016	→ Nieciecza (loan)	4	(0)
2016–2017	→ Domžale (loan)	21	(2)
2017–2018	FC Sursee	12	(14)
2018	Neuchâtel Xamax	1	(0)
2018–2019	FC Sursee	17	(11)
2019–2020	Schötz	14	(4)
2020–2023	Emmenbrücke	41	(40)
2024	FC Rotkreuz	14	(2)

International career
2009	Slovenia U17	3	(0)
2010	Slovenia U19	3	(0)
2011–2013	Slovenia U20	4	(0)
2013–2014	Slovenia U21	8	(6)
2017	Slovenia B	2	(0)
- * Club domestic league appearances and goals as of 14:35, 21 August 2024 (UTC)

Elvis Bratanović (born 21 August 1992) is a Slovenian professional footballer who plays as a forward.

== Career ==
In 2014, he signed a four-year contract with the Czech First League side FK Teplice.

He had been playing in Switzerland's amateur leagues since 2017, for Sursee, Neuchâtel Xamax, Schötz and Emmenbrücke.

== Honours ==
Domžale

- Slovenian Cup: 2016–17
