= Luka Žinko =

Slovenian footballer (born 1983)

Personal information
- Date of birth: 23 March 1983 (age 43)
- Place of birth: Ljubljana, SFR Yugoslavia
- Height: 1.85 m (6 ft 1 in)
- Position: Midfielder

Youth career
- 1990–1997: Slovan
- 1997–2002: Factor

Senior career*
Years	Team	Apps	(Gls)
2002–2003	Factor	30	(7)
2003–2004	Šmartno ob Paki	31	(4)
2004–2005	Istres	0	(0)
2005	Factor	1	(1)
2005	Bela Krajina	12	(2)
2006–2008	Domžale	84	(13)
2009	Kocaelispor	7	(0)
2009–2010	APOP Kinyras Peyias	25	(1)
2010	→ FC Amkar Perm (loan)	3	(0)
2011	Alki Larnaca	14	(0)
2011–2012	Rudar Velenje	31	(5)
2013	Gabala	8	(1)
2013–2014	Hangzhou Greentown	34	(1)
2015	Olimpija Ljubljana	10	(0)
2015–2016	Krško	23	(2)
2016–2018	Domžale	16	(0)
2017–2018	→ Celje (loan)	21	(6)
2018–2021	Bravo	93	(12)
Total		443	(55)

International career
2001	Slovenia U17	4	(0)
2002–2003	Slovenia U20	7	(3)
2002–2005	Slovenia U21	24	(0)
2004–2008	Slovenia	3	(0)

Managerial career
- 2024: Radomlje (caretaker)
- 2025–2026: Slovan
- * Club domestic league appearances and goals

Luka Žinko (born 23 March 1983) is a Slovenian former footballer who played as a midfielder.

== Club career ==
=== Gabala ===
In January 2013, Žinko signed a six-month contract, with the option of another year, with Azerbaijan Premier League team Gabala. He scored his first goal for Gabala on his debut against Qarabağ. Žinko left Gabala in May 2013 at the end of his contract. He had scored one goal in eight appearances.

=== Hangzhou Greentown ===
On 14 June 2013, Žinko signed for Chinese Super League side Hangzhou Greentown. Žinko scored for Hangzhou Greentown on his debut in a 2–2 draw away to Changchun Yatai on 6 July 2013.

== International career ==
Žinko made his debut for Slovenia in a November 2004 friendly match against Slovakia, coming on as a 82nd-minute substitute for Milenko Ačimovič.

== Honours ==
Domžale

- Slovenian PrvaLiga: 2006–07, 2007–08
- Slovenian Cup: 2016–17
- Slovenian Supercup: 2007
