= Andrej Kotnik =

Slovenian footballer (born 1995)

Personal information
- Date of birth: 4 August 1995 (age 31)
- Place of birth: Nova Gorica, Slovenia
- Height: 1.89 m (6 ft 2 in)
- Position: Midfielder

Team information
- Current team: Celje
- Number: 17

Youth career
- Koper
- Jadran Dekani
- Izola

Senior career*
Years	Team	Apps	(Gls)
2013–2015	Izola	32	(8)
2015–2019	Gorica	55	(6)
2017	→ Crotone (loan)	2	(0)
2018	→ Formentera (loan)	4	(0)
2019–2022	Maribor	43	(2)
2022–2023	Koper	46	(12)
2023–2024	Meizhou Hakka	11	(5)
2024	→ Dalian Yingbo (loan)	24	(8)
2025	Dalian K'un City	8	(0)
2025–	Celje	1	(0)
- * Club domestic league appearances and goals as of 21 July 2025

Andrej Kotnik (born 4 August 1995) is a Slovenian professional footballer who plays as a midfielder for Slovenian PrvaLiga Celje.

== Club career ==
Kotnik made his Slovenian PrvaLiga debut for Gorica on 18 July 2015 in a game against Olimpija Ljubljana.

He made his Serie A debut for Crotone on 5 February 2017 as a 61st-minute substitute for Marcello Trotta in a 1–0 loss to Palermo.

On 2 August 2023, Kotnik signed with Chinese Super League club Meizhou Hakka.

On 28 February 2024, Kotnik joined China League One club Dalian Yingbo on loan.

== Career statistics ==
As of 14 June 2025

Appearances and goals by club, season and competition
Club	Season	League			National cup (Note: Includes Slovenian Cup)		Continental		Total	
Club	Season	Division	Apps	Goals	Apps	Goals	Apps	Goals	Apps	Goals
Gorica	2015–16	Slovenian PrvaLiga	18	3	0	0	—		18	3
Gorica	2016–17	Slovenian PrvaLiga	17	2	3	2	2 (Note: Appearances in UEFA Europa League)	0	22	4
Gorica	2018–19	Slovenian PrvaLiga	20	1	2	0	—		22	1
Gorica	Total		55	6	5	2	2	0	62	8
Crotone (loan)	2016–17	Serie A	2	0	0	0	—		2	0
Formentera (loan)	2017–18	Segunda División B	4	0	0	0	—		4	0
Maribor	2019–20	Slovenian PrvaLiga	22	1	1	1	7 (Note: Six appearances and one goal in UEFA Champions League, one appearance in UEFA Europa League)	1	30	3
Maribor	2020–21	Slovenian PrvaLiga	20	1	1	0	0	0	21	1
Maribor	2021–22	Slovenian PrvaLiga	1	0	0	0	1 (Note: Appearance(s) in UEFA Europa Conference League)	0	2	0
Maribor	Total		43	2	2	1	8	1	53	4
Koper	2021–22	Slovenian PrvaLiga	14	0	2	1	—		16	1
Koper	2022–23	Slovenian PrvaLiga	32	12	2	2	2	1	36	15
Koper	Total		46	12	4	3	2	1	52	16
Meizhou Hakka	2023	Chinese Super League	11	5	0	0	—		11	5
Dalian Yingbo (loan)	2024	China League One	24	8	0	0	—		24	8
Dalian K'un City	2025	China League One	8	0	0	0	—		8	0
Career total			193	33	11	6	12	2	216	41

== Honours ==
Celje

- Slovenian PrvaLiga: 2025–26
