= Sergei Vinogradov (footballer, born 1971) =

Russian footballer

Personal information
- Full name: Sergei Vasilyevich Vinogradov
- Date of birth: 19 August 1971 (age 55)
- Height: 1.84 m (6 ft 1/2 in)
- Position: Defender

Senior career*
Years	Team	Apps	(Gls)
1988	FC MTsOP-Volgogradets Volgograd		
1990	FC Rotor Volgograd	0	(0)
1990	FC MTsOP-Sudostroitel Volgograd		
1991	FC Torpedo Volzhsky	28	(0)
1992–1993	FC Rotor Volgograd	3	(0)
1992–1993	→ FC Rotor-d Volgograd (loans)	47	(0)
1994	FC Svetotekhnika Saransk	28	(0)
1995–1997	FC Zarya Leninsk-Kuznetsky	84	(1)
1998	FC Svetotekhnika Saransk	33	(0)
1999	FC Olimpia Volgograd (amateur)		
2000	FC Olimpia Volgograd	26	(0)
2002	FC Tekstilshchik Kamyshin (amateur)		
2003	FC Tekstilshchik Kamyshin	4	(0)
2003	FC BIO Svetly Yar		

Managerial career
- 2004: FC Tekstilshchik Kamyshin (massage therapist)
- 2007: FC Moscow (massage therapist)
- * Club domestic league appearances and goals

Sergei Vasilyevich Vinogradov (Russian: Сергей Васильевич Виноградов; born 19 August 1971) is a former Russian football player.
