= Žan Žužek =

Slovenian footballer (born 1997)

Personal information
- Date of birth: 26 January 1997 (age 29)
- Place of birth: Ljubljana, Slovenia
- Height: 1.86 m (6 ft 1 in)
- Positions: Centre-back; defensive midfielder

Team information
- Current team: Celje
- Number: 15

Youth career
- –2016: Domžale

Senior career*
Years	Team	Apps	(Gls)
2014–2019	Domžale	65	(3)
2019–2022	Koper	85	(7)
2022–2024	Bari	26	(0)
2024–2026	Gençlerbirliği	70	(3)
2026–	Celje	1	(0)

International career
2012–2013	Slovenia U16	12	(0)
2013	Slovenia U17	5	(0)
2014	Slovenia U18	4	(0)
2015–2016	Slovenia U19	17	(1)
2017–2018	Slovenia U21	10	(1)
- * Club domestic league appearances and goals as of 6 September 2026

Žan Žužek (born 26 January 1997) is a Slovenian professional footballer who plays as a centre-back for Slovenian PrvaLiga club Celje.

== Club career ==
On 23 August 2022, Žužek signed a three-year contract with Bari in Italy.
