= Tadej Rems =

Slovenian footballer

Personal information
- Full name: Tadej Rems
- Date of birth: 31 July 1993 (age 33)
- Place of birth: Ljubljana, Slovenia
- Height: 1.84 m (6 ft 1/2 in)
- Position: Centre back

Team information
- Current team: Dob
- Number: 39

Youth career
- –2012: Domžale

Senior career*
Years	Team	Apps	(Gls)
2011–2015	Domžale	21	(0)
2014	→ Zarica Kranj (loan)	12	(2)
2014–2015	→ Radomlje (loan)	15	(0)
2015–2017	Radomlje	17	(0)
2017	Zarica Kranj	10	(0)
2017–2019	Ilirija 1911	50	(1)
2019–	Dob	60	(5)

International career
2012	Slovenia U19	4	(0)
- * Club domestic league appearances and goals as of 12 January 2024

Tadej Rems (born 31 July 1993) is a Slovenian football defender who plays for NK Dob.
