= Marko Alvir =

Croatian professional football winger

Personal information
- Date of birth: 19 April 1994 (age 32)
- Place of birth: Zagreb, Croatia
- Height: 1.82 m (5 ft 11 1/2 in)
- Position: Attacking midfielder

Team information
- Current team: Viktoria Plzeň

Youth career
- Kustošija Zagreb
- Zagreb
- 2010–2013: Dinamo Zagreb
- 2013–2014: Atlético Madrid

Senior career*
Years	Team	Apps	(Gls)
2014–2015	Atlético Madrid C	21	(0)
2015–2016	Domžale	32	(9)
2017–2019	Slavia Prague	0	(0)
2017–2018	→ Domžale (loan)	21	(5)
2019	→ Příbram (loan)	18	(2)
2020–	Viktoria Plzeň	11	(0)
2021	→ Dynamo České Budějovice (loan)	18	(2)
2021–2022	→ Maribor (loan)	32	(3)

International career
2010–2011	Croatia U17	7	(1)
2012	Croatia U18	3	(0)
2011–2013	Croatia U19	8	(2)
- * Club domestic league appearances and goals as of 23 May 2022

Marko Alvir (born 19 April 1994) is a Croatian professional football midfielder who plays for Viktoria Plzeň.

== Club career ==
Alvir signed for Slovenian team Domžale from Atlético Madrid's youth system on a free transfer in 2015. On 1 January 2017, he signed for Slavia Prague of the Czech First League.

On 6 July 2021, Alvir joined Slovenian side Maribor on a season-long loan from Viktoria Plzeň.
