= Rok Baskera =

Slovenian footballer

Personal information
- Date of birth: 26 May 1993 (age 33)
- Place of birth: Celje, Slovenia
- Positions: Right winger; right-back

Youth career
- –2011: Šampion
- 2011–2012: Genoa

Senior career*
Years	Team	Apps	(Gls)
2012	Šampion	0	(0)
2012–2016	Olimpija Ljubljana	46	(1)
2016–2017	Krško	8	(1)
2017	Olimpija Ljubljana	5	(0)
2017–2019	Kras Repen	14	(1)
2019–2021	Šampion	7	(2)
2021–2022	WSG Radenthein	21	(12)

International career
2011–2012	Slovenia U19 (Note: Official competitive UEFA matches only.)	5	(2)
2013	Slovenia U20	1	(0)
- * Club domestic league appearances and goals

Rok Baskera (born 26 May 1993) is a Slovenian retired footballer who last played for Austrian side WSG Radenthein.
