= Aleksandar Srdić =

Serbian footballer

Personal information
- Full name: Aleksandar Srdić
- Date of birth: 30 May 1992 (age 34)
- Place of birth: Trebišov, Czechoslovakia
- Height: 1.79 m (5 ft 10 in)
- Position: Right wing

Youth career
- 2010–2011: Radnički Beograd

Senior career*
Years	Team	Apps	(Gls)
2011–2012	BASK	23	(6)
2012	PKB Padinska Skela	13	(3)
2013	Celje	16	(3)
2014	Serres	18	(1)
2014	Săgeata Năvodari	9	(3)
2015	Mačva Šabac	11	(0)
2016	Dinamo Vranje	11	(0)
2016	Aluminij	12	(0)
2017	United Zürich	11	(5)
2017–2019	FC Wettswil-Bonstetten	20	(5)
2019	FC Regensdorf		
2019–2020	Freienbach	9	(4)
2020–2021	Zug 94		
- * Club domestic league appearances and goals as of 13:52, 18 October 2019 (UTC)

Aleksandar Srdić (Serbian Cyrillic: Александар Срдић; born 30 May 1992) is a Serbian football winger.

== Career ==
Born in Trebišov, Czechoslovakia (now Slovakia), he played in Serbian lower-league sides Radnički Beograd, BASK and PKB Padinska Skela before moving to Slovenian side Celje during the winter break of the 2012–13 season. He played with Celje in the Slovenian First League until the following winter-break of the 2013–14 season when he moved to Greece and played the rest of the season with Serres in the Greek Football League (second league). In summer 2014 he moved to Romania and joined Săgeata Năvodari playing in the Liga II. During the winter break of the 2014–15 season he returned to Serbia and joined Mačva Šabac paying in Serbian second-tier.

Ahead of the 2019–20 season, Srdić joined Swiss club FC Freienbach from FC Regensdorf.

== Honours ==
BASK

- Serbian First League: 2010–11
