= Filip Dangubić =

Croatian footballer (born 1995)

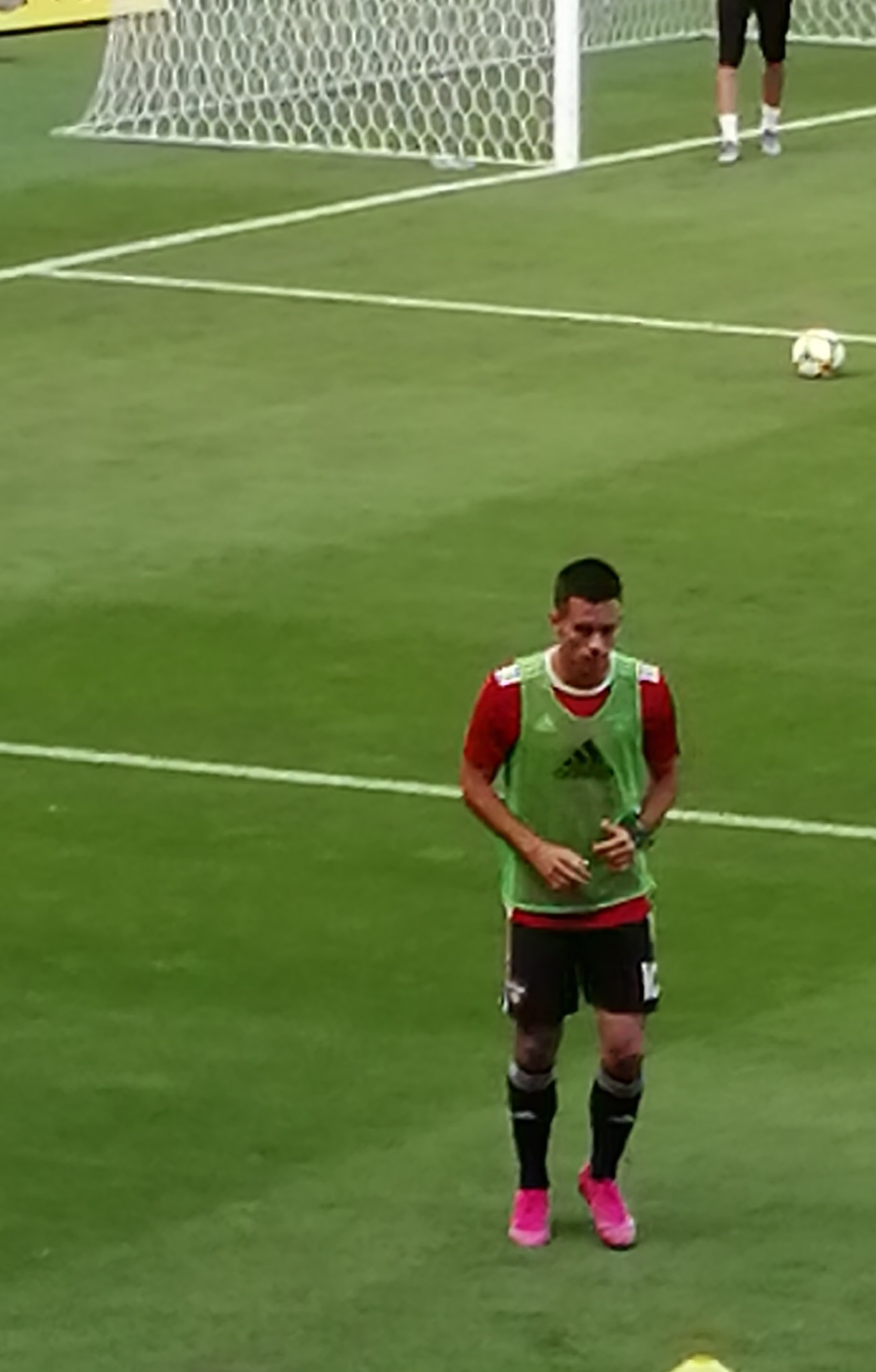
- Dangubić with Spartak Trnava in 2019

Personal information
- Date of birth: 5 May 1995 (age 31)
- Place of birth: Rijeka, Croatia
- Height: 1.80 m (5 ft 11 in)
- Position: Forward

Youth career
- 2006–2008: Rijeka
- 2008–2009: Klana
- 2009–2014: Rijeka

Senior career*
Years	Team	Apps	(Gls)
2014–2015	Rijeka II	26	(16)
2014–2018	Rijeka	1	(0)
2014	→ Pomorac (loan)	0	(0)
2015–2016	→ Krka (loan)	31	(2)
2016–2017	→ Krško (loan)	35	(13)
2017	→ Celje (loan)	18	(6)
2018–2020	Spartak Trnava	27	(0)
2019	→ Senica (loan)	9	(2)
2020	Chindia Târgoviște	14	(1)
2020–2021	Celje	34	(10)
2021–2022	UTA Arad	32	(1)
2023	Hegelmann	35	(18)
2024	Kauno Žalgiris	24	(10)
2024–2025	Željezničar	28	(7)

International career
2010	Croatia U15	2	(0)
2011	Croatia U16	3	(0)
2011	Croatia U17	1	(0)
2015	Croatia U20	2	(0)
2015	Croatia U21	4	(1)
- * Club domestic league appearances and goals as of 25 May 2025

Filip Dangubić (born 5 May 1995) is a Croatian professional footballer who plays as a forward.

== Club career ==
=== Rijeka ===
Born in Rijeka, Dangubić spent his youth years with the HNK Rijeka Academy. During the 2013–14 season of the U19 Croatian Academy Football League, he was the second top scorer with 16 goals. In June 2014, he signed his first professional contract with Rijeka that tied him with the club until June 2017. In his first professional season with the club, Dangubić mainly featured for the reserve side in Croatia's Treća HNL, scoring 16 goals. During the season he also made his debut for the Rijeka first team in a home win against Lokomotiva on 10 May 2015.

=== Pomorac (loan) ===
In February 2014, Dangubić was loaned to Pomorac in Croatia's Druga HNL, but did not collect any caps due to a long-term injury.

=== Krka (loan) ===
In June 2015, Rijeka sent Dangubić on a season-long loan to Krka in the Slovenian PrvaLiga. On 25 October 2015, Dangubić scored his first goal for Krka in a league match against Krško.

=== Krško (loan) ===
In July 2016, Dangubić was loaned to Krško in Slovenia. He scored on his debut in an away draw against Rudar Velenje on 16 July 2016.

=== Celje (loan) ===
In July 2017, Dangubić was once again sent on loan to a Slovenian club, this time to Celje.

=== Spartak Trnava ===
On 4 July 2018, Dangubić was transferred to Slovak First League side Spartak Trnava.

=== Senica (loan) ===
On 21 February 2019, Dangubić was loaned to Senica in Slovakia.

=== Chindia Târgoviște ===
On 6 February 2020, Romanian side Chindia Târgoviște announced the signing of Dangubić.

=== Return to Celje ===
On 4 August 2020, Dangubić returned to Slovenian champions Celje, signing a contract until 30 June 2022. He was released by the club on 28 June 2021.

=== Kauno Žalgiris ===
On 1 March 2024, Dangubić signed with Lithuanian A Lyga club Kauno Žalgiris. On 9 August 2024, Žalgiris announced that he had left the club to join Bosnian Premier League side Željezničar.

=== Željezničar ===
On 12 August 2024, Dangubić joined Željezničar on a contract until June 2025, with the option of extending for a further year. He made his debut in a 3–1 home win over Igman Konjic on 17 August 2024. Dangubić scored his first goal for the club in a 1–0 home win against Posušje on 29 September 2024. He scored two goals in a 3–0 away win over Leotar in the Bosnian Cup first round on 29 October 2024.

Dangubić left Željezničar in June 2025 after his contract expired.

== International career ==
Dangubić was capped for Croatia at various age levels. He collected one cap for the U17 side, two caps for the U20 side, and four caps for the U21 side among others.

== Honours ==
Rijeka

- Croatian Super Cup: 2014
