= Gaber Dobrovoljc =

Slovenian football defender (born 1993)

Personal information
- Date of birth: 27 January 1993 (age 33)
- Place of birth: Ljubljana, Slovenia
- Height: 1.83 m (6 ft 0 in)
- Position: Defender

Youth career
- 2000–2012: Domžale

Senior career*
Years	Team	Apps	(Gls)
2011–2019	Domžale	172	(14)
2019–2020	Fatih Karagümrük	19	(0)
2020–2022	Domžale	34	(2)
2022	KA Akureyri	7	(1)
2023	Radomlje	9	(0)
2023–2024	Mura	9	(0)
2024–2025	Radomlje	43	(3)

International career
2011–2012	Slovenia U19 (Note: Official competitive UEFA matches only.)	6	(0)
2011–2013	Slovenia U20	2	(0)
2013–2014	Slovenia U21	4	(1)
2017–2019	Slovenia B	2	(1)
- * Club domestic league appearances and goals as of 2 July 2025

Gaber Dobrovoljc (born 27 January 1993) is a Slovenian footballer who plays as a defender.

== Career ==
Dobrovoljc had a spell with Icelandic side KA Akureyri in 2022.
