= David Bučar =

Slovenian footballer

Personal information
- Date of birth: 8 February 1994 (age 32)
- Place of birth: Brežice, Slovenia
- Height: 1.74 m (5 ft 9 in)
- Position: Midfielder

Team information
- Current team: Krško Posavje
- Number: 11

Youth career
- –2013: Krško

Senior career*
Years	Team	Apps	(Gls)
2013–2016	Krško	65	(6)
2016	→ Brežice 1919 (loan)	10	(1)
2017–2018	Brežice 1919	14	(4)
2018	SVU St Stefan ob Stainz	9	(3)
2019	KMN Sevnica (futsal)	17	(4)
2019	FK Austria ASV Puch	8	(5)
2020–	Krško Posavje	20	(5)
- * Club domestic league appearances and goals as of 20 March 2017

David Bučar (born 8 February 1994) is a Slovenian footballer who plays as a midfielder for Krško Posavje. He developed his early football skills with NK Krško, progressing through their youth system until 2013, and would later go on to play in the Austrian lower leagues.
