= Slovenia national football B team =

Association football team

Slovenia B
- Association: Football Association of Slovenia
- Confederation: UEFA (Europe)
- Head coach: Matjaž Kek
- FIFA code: SVN

The Slovenia national football B team (Slovene: Slovenska B nogometna reprezentanca) is a secondary football team that serves as a support for the Slovenia national team and is controlled by the Football Association of Slovenia, the governing body for football in Slovenia.

== Results ==
As of 24 January 2019, the team has played seven matches.

=== 2000s ===
21 January 2003 Friendly	Portugal	3–2	Slovenia	Rio Maior, Portugal
17:15	Silas 20'; Assis 44'; Rui Miguel 70'	Report	Šiljak 18'; Zahovič 36' (pen.)	Stadium: Estádio Municipal de Rio Maior; Attendance: 2,000; Referee: Alexei Egorov (Russia)

23 January 2003 Friendly	Slovenia	0–1	Russia
15:00		Report	Vinogradov 36'	Attendance: 300; Referee: Paulo Paraty (Portugal)

24 January 2006 Friendly	Portugal	1–1 (0–3 p)	Slovenia	Abrantes, Portugal
18:15	Almeida 56'	Report (NZS); Report (STA)	Gobec 54'	Stadium: Estádio Municipal de Abrantes; Referee: Ricardo Santos (Portugal)
	Penalties
			(penalty scored) Birsa; (penalty scored) Ljubijankić; (penalty scored) Beršnjak

26 January 2006 Friendly	Slovenia	2–3	Slovakia	Alcanena, Portugal
15:30	Ljubijankić 40'; Beršnjak 71' (pen.)	Report	Bicák 26'; Žofčák 76', 87'	Stadium: Estádio Municipal de Alcanena; Referee: Herani Fernandes (Portugal)

=== 2010s ===
10 January 2017 Friendly	Saudi Arabia	0–0	Slovenia	Abu Dhabi, United Arab Emirates
19:00		Report		Stadium: Zayed Sports City Stadium; Referee: Ammar Ali Abdulla Jumaa Al Junaibi (United Arab Emirates)

13 January 2017 Friendly	Slovenia	2–0	Finland	Abu Dhabi, United Arab Emirates
19:00	Kronaveter 12'; Dobrovoljc 47'	Report		Stadium: Armed Forces Stadium; Referee: Hamad Ali Yousef (United Arab Emirates)

24 January 2019 Friendly	Slovenia	2–2	China U25	Marbella, Spain
17:00	Zahović 24'; Vombergar 54'	Report	Liu Junshuai 31'; Liao Lisheng 60'	Stadium: Estadio Municipal de Marbella; Referee: José Antonio Gutiérrez Pérez (Spain)

== Players ==
=== 2019 squad ===
The following players were called up for the friendly match against China U25 on 24 January 2019.

Players in bold have played at least one full international match with the Slovenia senior team before the match against China U25.
Clubs listed are correct as of 24 January 2019, when the match took place.

No.	Pos.	Player	Date of birth (age)	Club
1	GK	Grega Sorčan	5 March 1996 (aged 22)	(Slovenia) Gorica
12	GK	Nejc Vidmar	31 March 1989 (aged 29)	(Slovenia) Olimpija Ljubljana
16	GK	Luka Janžekovič	14 March 1997 (aged 21)	(Slovenia) Aluminij
2	DF	**Gregor Sikošek**	13 February 1994 (aged 24)	(Slovenia) Domžale
3	DF	Uroš Korun	25 May 1987 (aged 31)	(Poland) Piast Gliwice
5	DF	Gaber Dobrovoljc	27 January 1993 (aged 25)	(Slovenia) Domžale
6	DF	**Antonio Delamea Mlinar**	10 June 1991 (aged 27)	(United States) New England Revolution
13	DF	Klemen Šturm	27 June 1994 (aged 24)	(Slovenia) Mura
18	DF	Tilen Klemenčič	21 August 1995 (aged 23)	(Slovenia) Domžale
19	DF	Denis Klinar	21 February 1992 (aged 26)	(Slovenia) Maribor
4	MF	**Amedej Vetrih**	16 September 1990 (aged 28)	(Slovenia) Domžale
8	MF	**Amir Dervišević** (captain)	4 July 1992 (aged 26)	(Slovenia) Maribor
14	MF	Dino Hotić	26 July 1995 (aged 23)	(Slovenia) Maribor
15	MF	Dejan Petrovič	12 January 1998 (aged 21)	(Slovenia) Aluminij
17	MF	**Rudi Požeg Vancaš**	15 March 1994 (aged 24)	(Slovenia) Celje
20	MF	**Dejan Lazarević**	15 February 1990 (aged 28)	(Slovenia) Domžale
21	MF	**Matic Črnic**	12 June 1992 (aged 26)	(Slovenia) Olimpija Ljubljana
22	MF	**Blaž Vrhovec**	20 February 1992 (aged 26)	(Slovenia) Maribor
23	MF	Adam Gnezda Čerin	16 July 1999 (aged 19)	(Slovenia) Domžale
7	FW	Rok Sirk	10 September 1993 (aged 25)	(Slovenia) Mura
9	FW	Andrés Vombergar	20 November 1994 (aged 24)	(Slovenia) Olimpija Ljubljana
10	FW	Jan Mlakar	23 October 1998 (aged 20)	(Slovenia) Maribor
11	FW	**Luka Zahović**	15 November 1995 (aged 23)	(Slovenia) Maribor

== Head-to-head record ==
As of 24 January 2019

Opponent	Pld	W	D	L	GF	GA	GD	Win %
China U25	1	0	1	0	2	2	+0	0.00
Finland	1	1	0	0	2	0	+2	100.00
Portugal	2	0	1	1	3	4	−1	0.00
Russia	1	0	0	1	0	1	−1	0.00
Saudi Arabia	1	0	1	0	0	0	+0	0.00
Slovakia	1	0	0	1	2	3	−1	0.00
Six countries	7	1	3	3	9	10	−1	14.29

== See also ==
- Slovenia national under-21 football team
- Slovenia national under-19 football team
- Slovenia national under-17 football team
