= 2016–17 NK Aluminij season =

NK Aluminij
2016–17 season
- President: Zvonko Jevšovar
- Head Coach: Bojan Špehonja
- Stadium: Kidričevo Sports Park
- Slovenian League: 9th
- Slovenian Cup: Quarter-finals
- Top goalscorer: League: Žiga Škoflek (5); All: Žiga Škoflek (7)
- Highest home attendance: 1,500 (vs Maribor)
- Lowest home attendance: 100 (vs Gorica & Radomlje)
- Average home league attendance: 494
Home colours	Away colours	Third colours
- All statistics correct as of 11 December 2016.

The 2016–17 season was Aluminij's second season in the Slovenian PrvaLiga, Slovenian top division, since the league was created. Aluminij competed in Slovenian PrvaLiga and Slovenian Football Cup. Aluminij drew the lowest average home attendance in the Slovenian top-flight football league in 2016-17, with 494. NK Radomlje drew the second-lowest average home attendance with 550.

== Players ==
As of 11 December 2016

Note: Flags indicate national team as defined under FIFA eligibility rules; some limited exceptions apply. Players may hold more than one non-FIFA nationality.

No.	Pos.	Nation	Player
—	GK	SLO	Luka Janžekovič
—	GK	SLO	Kristian Lipovac
—	GK	SLO	Žan Hrastnik
—	DF	SLO	Tilen Ahec
—	DF	CRO	Vedran Turkalj
—	DF	CRO	Mateo Damiš
—	DF	SRB	Nemanja Jakšić
—	DF	CRO	Josip Zeba
—	MF	SLO	Matic Vrbanec
—	MF	SLO	Žiga Škoflek
—	MF	SLO	Dejan Krljanović (captain)
—	MF	SLO	Dejan Petrovič
—	MF	SLO	Anton Rogina

No.	Pos.	Nation	Player
—	MF	SLO	Nejc Brodnjak
—	MF	SLO	Denis Vezjak
—	MF	SLO	Erik Zorec
—	MF	CRO	Lovro Cvek
—	MF	ALB	Francesco Tahiraj
—	FW	SLO	Milan Kocić
—	FW	SLO	Domen Klanjšek
—	FW	SLO	Blaž Kramer
—	MF	SRB	Aleksandar Srdić
—	FW	CRO	Mihael Rebernik
—	FW	SLO	Lovro Bizjak
—	FW	CRO	Toni Petrović

Source: NK Aluminij

== Pre-season and friendlies ==
=== Summer ===
18 June 2016 1	Dobrovce	1–4	Aluminij	Dobrovce, Slovenia
17:00 CEST (UTC+02:00)			Škoflek 34'; Vrbanec 80' (pen.), 86'; Pintarič 88'	Stadium: Dobrovce Sports Park

21 June 2016 2	Aluminij (Slovenia)	0–5	(Serbia) Vojvodina	Kidričevo, Slovenia
18:00 CEST (UTC+02:00)			Trujić 6', 81'; Babić 17', 45'; Paločević 63'	Stadium: Kidričevo Spors Park; Attendance: 50

26 June 2016 3	Aluminij (Slovenia)	1–0	(Croatia) Hajduk Split	Kidričevo, Slovenia
18:00 CEST (UTC+02:00)	Vrbanec 70'			Stadium: Kidričevo Sports Park; Attendance: 0

2 July 2016 4	Aluminij (Slovenia)	0–1	(Croatia) Slaven Belupo	Kidričevo, Slovenia
17:00 CET (UTC+01:00)				Stadium: Kidričevo Sports Park

6 July 2016 5	Rijeka (Croatia)	2–2	(Slovenia) Aluminij	Rijeka, Croatia
19:15 CEST (UTC+02:00)	Ajayi 25'; Matei 90+4' (pen.)		Vrbanec 41', 68'	Stadium: Stadion Rujevica; Attendance: 1,500; Referee: Vedran Jelenčić

3 September 2016 6	Aluminij (Slovenia)	1–0	(Croatia) Inter Zaprešić	Kidričevo, Slovenia
17:00 CET (UTC+01:00)	Rebernik 30'			Stadium: Kidričevo Sports Park

== Competitions ==
=== Overall ===
Competition	Started round	Current position / round	Final position / round	First match	Last match
PrvaLiga	Pre-season	9th		17 July 2016	27 May 2017
Cup	First round	—	Quarter-finals	17 August 2016	26 October 2016

Updated to match played 11 December 2016
Source: Competitions

=== Overview ===
Competition	Record							
Competition	G	W	D	L	GF	GA	GD	Win %
PrvaLiga	21	4	6	11	15	33	−18	19.05
Cup	4	1	1	2	4	6	−2	25.00
Total	25	5	7	13	19	39	−20	20.00

Updated to match played 11 December 2016
Source: Competitions

=== PrvaLiga ===
==== League table ====
Pos	Team	Pld	W	D	L	GF	GA	GD	Pts	Qualification or relegation
6	Koper (R)	36	12	14	10	43	40	+3	50	Relegation to fourth tier (Note: Koper did not get a competition licence and was thus relegated to the fourth division.)
7	Rudar Velenje	36	10	11	15	49	53	−4	41	
8	Krško	36	8	15	13	39	50	−11	39	
9	Aluminij	36	9	11	16	38	52	−14	38	
10	Radomlje (R)	36	1	10	25	23	80	−57	13	Relegation to Slovenian Second League

Source: PrvaLiga (in Slovene), Soccerway
Rules for classification: 1) Points; 2) Head-to-head points; 3) Head-to-head goal difference; 4) Head-to-head away goals scored; 5) Goal difference; 6) Goals scored; 7) Away goals scored; 8) Fairplay ranking; 9) Draw.
(R) Relegated

==== Results summary ====
Overall								Home						Away					
Pld	W	D	L	GF	GA	GD	Pts	W	D	L	GF	GA	GD	W	D	L	GF	GA	GD
36	9	11	16	38	52	−14	38	7	6	5	24	24	0	2	5	11	14	28	−14

Last updated: 27 May 2017.
Source: Competitive matches

==== Results by round ====
Round	1	2	3	4	5	6	7	8	9	10	11	12	13	14	15	16	17	18	19	20	21	22	23	24	25	26	27	28	29	30	31	32	33	34	35	36
Ground	A	A	H	A	H	A	H	A	H	H	H	A	H	A	H	A	H	A	A	A	H	A	H	A	H	A	H	H	H	A	H	A	H	A	H	A
Result	L	L	L	D	W	W	L	L	L	D	D	L	W	D	D	D	L	L	L	L	W	W	D	L	W	L	W	L	D	L	W	D	W	D	D	L
Position	9	9	9	9	9	7	8	9	9	9	9	9	9	9	9	9	9	9	9	9	9	9	9	9	9	9	9	9	9	9	8	8	8	9	9	9

Updated to match(es) played on 27 May 2017. Source: Competitive matches
A = Away; H = Home; W = Win; D = Draw; L = Loss

==== Matches ====
Win Draw Loss Fixtures

17 July 2016 1	Gorica	2–0	Aluminij	Nova Gorica
18:15 CEST (UTC+02:00)	Arčon 30'; Kavčič 50', (yellow card) 66'; Kolenc (yellow card) 90+3'	Report (in Slovene)	Turkalj (yellow card) 74'; Roškar (yellow card) 87' (yellow-red card) 90+2'	Stadium: Nova Gorica Sports Park; Attendance: 500; Referee: Mitja Žganec

23 July 2016 2	Koper	1–0	Aluminij	Koper
18:15 CEST (UTC+02:00)	Ibričić (yellow card) 37'; Sikošek (yellow card) 49'; Horvat (yellow card) 57'; Datković (yellow card) 66'; Štromajer 83'; Simčič (yellow card) 90+4'	Report (in Slovene)	Bizjak (yellow card) 72'; Krljanović (yellow card) 90'	Stadium: Bonifika Stadium; Attendance: 700; Referee: Miran Bukovec

31 July 2016 3	Aluminij	2–4	Celje	Kidričevo
18:15 CEST (UTC+02:00)	Zeba 45'; Kurež 49'; Brodnjak (yellow card) 82'	Report (in Slovene)	Hadžić 29', 48'; Lovrečič (yellow card) 37'; Čirjak 53'; Glavaš 77'; Kous (yellow card) 90+1'	Stadium: Kidričevo Sports Park; Attendance: 300; Referee: Damir Skomina

6 August 2016 4	Radomlje	2–2	Aluminij	Domžale
18:15 CEST (UTC+02:00)	Kovjenić 17'; Kumer (yellow card) 70' (yellow-red card); Gajič 77'	Report (in Slovene)	Bizjak (yellow card) 41', (goal) 52', 69'; Kurež (yellow card) 53'; Jakšić (yellow card) 81' (yellow-red card)	Stadium: Domžale Sports Park; Attendance: 400; Referee: Alen Borošak

14 August 2016 5	Aluminij	3–0	Krško	Kidričevo
17:30 CEST (UTC+02:00)	Zeba 3'; Vezjak (yellow card) 42'; Vrbanec (yellow card) 51'; Krljanović 59'; Kramer 79'	Report (in Slovene)	Vuklišević (yellow card) 22' (yellow-red card); Zalokar (yellow card) 24'; Pušaver (yellow card) 45'; Urbanč (yellow card) 61'	Stadium: Kidričevo Sports Park; Attendance: 300; Referee: Matej Jug

21 August 2016 6	Maribor	0–2	Aluminij	Maribor
20:15 CEST (UTC+02:00)	Mertelj (yellow card) 13'; Šuler (yellow card) 64'; Hodžić (yellow card) 70'; Kabha (yellow card) 89'	Report (in Slovene)	Škoflek 24'; T. Petrović (yellow card) 42'; Zeba 72'	Stadium: Ljudski vrt Attendance: 2,000; Referee: Darjan Kovačič

28 August 2016 7	Aluminij	0–3	Rudar	Kidričevo
17:00 CEST (UTC+02:00)		Report (in Slovene)	Babić (yellow card) 13'; Billong (yellow card) 33'; Glavina (yellow card) 35'; Mary 37', 47'; Lotrič 52'	Stadium: Kidričevo Sports Park; Attendance: 600; Referee: Mitja Žganec

9 September 2016 8	Domžale	2–0	Aluminij	Domžale
20:15 CEST (UTC+02:00)	Morel (yellow card) 33'; Dobrovoljc (yellow card) 76'; Alvir 83', (yellow card) 84'; Majer 90+1'	Report (in Slovene)	Kocić (yellow card) 47'	Stadium: Domžale Sports Park; Attendance: 800; Referee: Darjan Kovačič

18 September 2016 9	Aluminij	0–3	Olimpija	Kidričevo
16:00 CEST (UTC+02:00)		Report (in Slovene)	Eleke 34'; Kronaveter (yellow card) 53'; Zajc 65'; Benko 67'	Stadium: Kidričevo Sports Park; Attendance: 1,200; Referee: Andrej Žnidaršič

21 September 2016 10	Aluminij	0–0	Gorica	Kidričevo
16:00 CEST (UTC+02:00)	Krljanović (yellow card) 58'; Vrbanec (yellow card) 83'	Report (in Slovene)	Kapić (yellow card) 59'	Stadium: Kidričevo Sports Park; Attendance: 100; Referee: Dejan Balažič

25 September 2016 11	Aluminij	0–0	Koper	Kidričevo
15:00 CEST (UTC+02:00)	Bizjak (yellow card) 62'; Jakšić (yellow card) 71'; Srdić (yellow card) 78'; Cvek (yellow card) 84'	Report (in Slovene)	Kokorović (yellow card) 19'; Valencia (yellow card) 73'	Stadium: Kidričevo Sports Park; Attendance: 200; Referee: Slavko Vinčić

1 October 2016 12	Celje	1–0	Aluminij	Celje
16:00 CEST (UTC+02:00)	Džinić (yellow card) 7'; Podlogar 37'; Požeg Vancaš (yellow card) 90+2'	Report (in Slovene)	Rogina (yellow card) 23'	Stadium: Arena Petrol; Attendance: 500; Referee: Matej Jug

15 October 2016 13	Aluminij	2–1	Radomlje	Kidričevo
15:00 CEST (UTC+02:00)	Škoflek 32', 59'; Jakšić (yellow card) 42'; Cvek (yellow card) 69'; Srdić (yellow card) 89'	Report (in Slovene)	Kosec (yellow card) 40'; Osmanaj 49'; Kumer (yellow card) 64'	Stadium: Kidričevo Sports Park; Attendance: 100; Referee: Damir Skomina

22 October 2016 14	Krško	2–2	Aluminij	Krško
16:00 CEST (UTC+02:00)	Pušaver (yellow card) 38'; Kramarič (yellow card) 41'; Arafat 54'; Drnovšek (yellow card) 80'; Haljeta 90+2'	Report (in Slovene)	Jakšić 18', (yellow card) 64'; Krljanović (yellow card) 49' (yellow-red card) 67'; Tahiraj (red card) 81'; Janžekovič (yellow card) 87'; Zeba 90+5'	Stadium: Matija Gubec Stadium; Attendance: 550; Referee: Darjan Kovačič

30 October 2016 15	Aluminij	0–0	Maribor	Kidričevo
14:00 CET (UTC+01:00)	Vrbanec (yellow card) 38'; Turkalj (yellow card) 44'; Rebernik (yellow card) 74'	Report (in Slovene)	Janža (yellow card) 88'	Stadium: Kidričevo SPorts Park; Attendance: 1,500; Referee: Roberto Ponis

5 November 2016 16	Rudar	0–0	Aluminij	Velenje
16:00 CET (UTC+01:00)	Eterović (yellow card) 25'; Grgić (yellow card) 33'; Grbić (yellow card) 80'	Report (in Slovene)		Stadium: Ob Jezeru City Stadium; Attendance: 400; Referee: Miran Bukovec

20 November 2016 17	Aluminij	0–4	Domžale	Kidričevo
14:00 CET (UTC+01:00)	Srdić (yellow card) 23'; Krljanović (yellow card) 88'	Report (in Slovene)	Kocić 6' (o.g.); Vuk 56'; Mance 62'; Dobrovoljc 70'	Stadium: Kidričevo SPorts Park; Attendance: 200; Referee: Slavko Vinčić

27 November 2016 18	Olimpija	3–0	Aluminij	Ljubljana
16:55 CET (UTC+01:00)	Kelhar 17'; Kirm (yellow card) 29'; Miškić 32'; Alves 56'	Report (in Slovene)	Škoflek (yellow card) 58'	Stadium: Stožice Stadium; Attendance: 1,700; Referee: Damir Skomina

30 November 2016 19	Gorica	3–0	Aluminij	Nova Gorica
16:00 CET (UTC+01:00)	Gregorič (yellow card) 62'; Kapić 80'; Burgić 87' (pen.), 90+1'; Jogan (yellow card) 89'	Report (in Slovene)	Vrbanec (yellow card) 8'; Tahiraj (yellow card) 36'; Cvek (yellow card) 76'	Stadium: Nova Gorica Sports Park; Attendance: 400; Referee: Asmir Sagrković

3 December 2016 20	Koper	1–0	Aluminij	Koper
16:00 CET (UTC+01:00)	Vekić 84', (yellow card) 84'; Pučko (yellow card) 89'; Datković (yellow card) 90+1'	Report (in Slovene)	Kocić (yellow card) 59'; Tahiraj (yellow card) 86'	Stadium: Bonifika Stadium; Attendance: 250; Referee: Mitja Žganec

10 December 2016 21	Aluminij	2–1	Celje	Kidričevo
12:00 CET (UTC+01:00)	Cvek (yellow card) 12'; Škoflek 77', 90+2'	Report (in Slovene)	Čirjak (yellow card) 10'; Glavaš (yellow card) 37'; Rahmanović (yellow card) 43'; Volaš 59'	Stadium: Kidričevo Sports Park; Attendance: 200; Referee: Bojan Mertik

25 February 2017 22	Radomlje	0–3	Aluminij	Domžale
15:00 CET (UTC+01:00)	Josip Balić (yellow card) 25'; Karamatić (yellow card) 79'	Report	Mensah (yellow card) 16' (goal) 71'; Josip Zeba 58'; Matic Vrbanec 81'	Stadium: Domžale Sports Park; Attendance: 700; Referee: (Slovenia) Nejc Kajtazović

5 March 2017 23	Aluminij	1–1	Krško	Kidričevo
15:00 CET (UTC+01:00)	Mateo Panadić (yellow card) 15'; Škoflek (yellow card) 17'; Jakšić (yellow card) 44'; Sanin Muminović (yellow card) 51'; Bizjak 57'	Report	Kramarič (yellow card) 18'; Dangubić 19'; Šturm (yellow card) 33'; Urbanč (yellow card) 35'; Robert Pušaver (yellow card) 62'; Krajcer (yellow card) 66'	Stadium: Kidričevo Sports Park; Attendance: 200; Referee: (Slovenia) Asmir Sagrković

11 March 2017 24	Maribor	4–1	Aluminij	Maribor
20:15 CET (UTC+01:00)	Zahović 41' (pen.); Novaković 64'; Vršič 66'; Marcos Tavares 86'	Report	Bizjak (yellow card) 40' (goal) 78'	Stadium: Ljudski vrt Attendance: 4,500; Referee: (Slovenia) Roberto Ponis

19 March 2017 25	Aluminij	3–0	Rudar Velenje	Kidričevo
15:00 CET (UTC+01:00)	Mensah (yellow card) 5'; Blaž Kramer 7'; Turkalj (yellow card) 28'; Tahiraj 67'; Škoflek 77'; Mateo Damiš (yellow card) 81'	Report	Babić (yellow card) 9'; Mateo Mužek (yellow card) 43' (yellow-red card); Grbić (yellow card) 56'; Iharoš (yellow card) 86'	Stadium: Kidričevo Sports Park; Attendance: 300; Referee: (Slovenia) Rade Obrenović

29 March 2017 26	Domžale	2–1	Aluminij	Domžale
18:00 CET (UTC+01:00)	Ožbolt 42'; Balkovec (yellow card) 45+1' (goal) 88'	Report	Mensah (yellow card) 16'; Jakšić (yellow card) 25'; Bizjak 45+1' (pen.); Mateo Damiš (yellow card) 54'	Stadium: Domžale Sports Park; Attendance: 500; Referee: (Slovenia) Matej Jug

2 April 2017 27	Aluminij	2–1	Olimpija Ljubljana	Kidričevo
16:00 CET (UTC+01:00)	Bizjak (yellow card) 24'; Tahiraj (yellow card) 61'; Blaž Kramer (yellow card) 71' (goal) 77'; Škoflek 83'	Report	Ricardo Alves (yellow card) 27'; Bajrić (yellow card) 38'; Benko 39'; Klinar (yellow card) 45+1'	Stadium: Aluminij Sports Park; Attendance: 800; Referee: (Slovenia) Dragoslav Perić

9 April 2017 28	Aluminij	1–2	Gorica	Kidričevo
15:00 CET (UTC+01:00)	Škoflek 20'; Jakšić (yellow card) 66'; Blaž Kramer (yellow card) 78'; Matic Vrbanec (yellow card) 81'; Bizjak (yellow card) 85'	Summary	Boben (yellow card) 28'; Žigon 49' (yellow card) 85'; Burgić 67' (pen.)	Stadium: Aluminij Sports Park; Attendance: 600; Referee: (Slovenia) Alen Borošak

17 April 2017 29	Aluminij	2–2	Koper	Kidričevo
16:00 CET (UTC+01:00)	Blaž Kramer (yellow card) 28'; Bizjak 46' 66'	Summary	Ed Kevin Kokorović 23' (yellow card) 73'; Datković (yellow card) 46'; Križman 59'	Stadium: Aluminij Sports Park; Attendance: 400; Referee: (Slovenia) Darjan Kovačič

22 April 2017 30	Celje	1–0	Aluminij	Celje
17:00 CET (UTC+01:00)	Jucie Lupeta 18'; Hadžić (yellow card) 78'	Summary	Jakšić (yellow card) 79'	Stadium: Arena Petrol; Attendance: 500; Referee: (Slovenia) Rade Obrenović

30 April 2017 31	Aluminij	3–1	Radomlje	Kidričevo
15:00 CET (UTC+01:00)	Blaž Kramer 11' 35'; Škoflek 26'	Summary	Rok Jazbec (yellow card) 31'; Kovjenić (yellow card) 39'; Cerar (yellow card) 47' (goal) 49'	Stadium: Aluminij Sports Park; Attendance: 400; Referee: (Slovenia) Matej Jug

5 May 2017 32	Krško	1–1	Aluminij	Krško
20:00 CET (UTC+01:00)	Robert Pušaver (yellow card) 67'; Dangubić 78'	Summary	Škoflek (yellow card) 49'; Tahiraj 67'; Mensah (yellow card) 81'	Stadium: Matija Gubec Stadium; Attendance: 800; Referee: (Slovenia) Damir Skomina

14 May 2017 33	Aluminij	3–1	Maribor	Kidričevo
16:55 CET (UTC+01:00)	Vedran Mesec 18' 42'; Blaž Kramer 44'; Matic Vrbanec (yellow card) 85'; Bizjak (yellow card) 90+3'	Summary	Vrhovec (yellow card) 57'; Hotić (yellow card) 78' (goal) 87'	Stadium: Aluminij Sports Park; Attendance: 1,200; Referee: (Slovenia) Asmir Sagrković

17 May 2017 34	Rudar Velenje	2–2	Aluminij	Velenje
18:00 CET (UTC+01:00)	Vručina 28' (yellow card) 89'; Zec 30'; Mateo Mužek (yellow card) 82'; Damir Grgić (yellow card) 84'	Summary	Rebernik 17' 37'	Stadium: Ob Jezeru; Attendance: 280; Referee: (Slovenia) Dejan Balažič

21 May 2017 35	Aluminij	0–0	Domžale	Kidričevo
16:55 CET (UTC+01:00)	Petrovič (yellow card) 8'; Jakšić (yellow card) 64'	Report	Franjić (yellow card) 20'	Stadium: Aluminij Sports Park; Attendance: 300; Referee: (Slovenia) Damir Skomina

27 May 2017 36	Olimpija Ljubljana	1–0	Aluminij	Ljubljana
16:55 CET (UTC+01:00)	Benko 39'; Štiglec (yellow card) 62'; Zarifović (yellow card) 78'	Report	Škoflek (yellow card) 78'	Stadium: Stožice Stadium; Attendance: 600; Referee: (Slovenia) Roberto Ponis

=== Cup ===
==== First round ====
Win Draw Loss Fixtures

17 August 2016 First round	Beltinci	0–2	Aluminij	Beltinci
16:00 CEST (UTC+02:00)	Zlatar (yellow card) 19'; Kristl (yellow card) 33'; Botjak (yellow card) 73'; Jamakovič (yellow card) 86'	Report (in Slovene)	D. Petrovič (yellow card) 24'; Kocić 43'; Vrbanec (yellow card) 61'; Škoflek 87'; Kramer (yellow card) 89'	Stadium: Beltinci Sports Park; Attendance: 300; Referee: Dejan Vivod

=== Second round ===
14 September 2016 Second round	Koper	0–0 (a.e.t.) (3–4 p)	Aluminij	Koper
18:00 CEST (UTC+02:00)	Valencia (yellow card) 70'; Dedić (yellow card) 82'; Gregov (yellow card) 102'; Biljan (yellow card) 118'	Report	Vezjak (yellow card) 76'; Petrovič (yellow card) 93'	Stadium: Bonifika Stadium; Attendance: 400; Referee: Alen Borošak
	Penalties
	Ibričić (penalty scored); Belima (penalty scored); Datković (penalty scored); Pekuson (penalty missed); Muslimović (penalty missed)		Krljanović (penalty missed); Bizjak (penalty scored); Kramer (penalty scored); Škoflek (penalty scored); Jakšić (penalty scored)

=== Quarter-finals ===
18 October 2016 First leg	Olimpija	2–1	Aluminij	Ljubljana
18:00 CEST (UTC+02:00)	Wobay 28'; Velikonja 54' (pen.)	Report	Škoflek 10'; Tahiraj (yellow card) 18'; Damiš (yellow card) 53'	Stadium: Stožice; Attendance: 1,500; Referee: Miran Bukovec

26 October 2016 Second leg	Aluminij	1–4 (2–6 agg.)	Olimpija	Kidričevo
14:00 CEST (UTC+02:00)	Škoflek (yellow card) 30'; Vezjak (yellow card) 42'; Srdić 56'	Report	Matić (yellow card) 5'; Zajc 10'; Velikonja 11'; Delamea Mlinar (yellow card) 52'; Bajrić (yellow card) 55'; Benko 60'; Alves (yellow card) 67'; Kirm 78'	Stadium: Kidričevo Sports Park; Attendance: 400; Referee: Bojan Mertik

== Statistics ==
=== Goalscorers ===
Slovenian PrvaLiga

5 goals

- (Slovenia) Žiga Škoflek

4 goals

- (Croatia) Josip Zeba

2 goals

- (Slovenia) Lovro Bizjak

1 goal

- (Slovenia) Robert Kurež
- (Slovenia) Dejan Krljanović
- (Serbia) Nemanja Jakšić
- (Slovenia) Blaž Kramer

Slovenian Football Cup

2 goal

- (Slovenia) Žiga Škoflek

1 goal

- (Slovenia) Milan Kocić
- (Serbia) Aleksandar Srdić

== See also ==
- 2016–17 Slovenian PrvaLiga
- 2016–17 Slovenian Football Cup
