= 2016–17 NK Celje season =

NK Celje
2016–17 season
- President: Stevan Đorđević
- Head Coach: Igor Jovićević
- Home stadium: Arena Petrol
- Slovenian League: 5th
- Slovenian Cup: Round of 16
- Top goalscorer: League: Dalibor Volaš (8); All: Dalibor Volaš (8)
- Highest home attendance: 2,900 (vs Olimpija)
- Lowest home attendance: 300 (vs Gorica)
- Average home league attendance: 1,036
Home colours	Away colours

The 2016–17 season was Celje's 26th season in the Slovenian top division, Slovenian PrvaLiga, since the league was created in 1991 with Celje as one of the league's founding members. Celje competed in Slovenian PrvaLiga and Slovenian Football Cup.

== Players ==
Note: Flags indicate national team as defined under FIFA eligibility rules; some limited exceptions apply. Players may hold more than one non-FIFA nationality.

No.	Pos.	Nation	Player
—	GK	SLO	Matic Kotnik
—	GK	SLO	Metod Jurhar
—	GK	SLO	Matjaž Rozman
—	DF	SLO	Žiga Kous
—	DF	SLO	Elvedin Džinić
—	DF	SLO	Tilen Klemenčič
—	DF	SLO	Jure Travner (captain)
—	DF	SLO	Damir Hadžić
—	DF	SLO	Tadej Vidmajer
—	MF	SLO	Anej Lovrečić
—	DF	BIH	Amar Rahmanović
—	MF	SLO	Rudi Požeg Vancaš

No.	Pos.	Nation	Player
—	MF	SLO	Jon Šporn
—	MF	SLO	Goran Cvijanović
—	MF	SLO	Nino Pungaršek
—	MF	CRO	Lovre Čirjak
—	MF	SLO	Janez Pišek
—	FW	CRO	Marin Glavaš
—	FW	SLO	Dalibor Volaš
—	FW	BIH	Irfan Hadžić
—	FW	SLO	Matej Podlogar
—	FW	SLO	Matic Marcius
—	FW	SLO	Mitja Križan
—	FW	SLO	Tilen Pečnik

Source:NK Celje

== Pre-season and friendlies ==
=== Summer ===
15 June 2016 1	Sturm Graz (Austria)	2–0	(Slovenia) Celje	Graz, Austria
17:00 CEST (UTC+02:00)	Alar 38'; Edomwonyi 45'	Report (in Slovene)

18 June 2016 2	Domžale	1–1	Celje	Radomlje
18:00 CEST (UTC+02:00)	Mance 13'	[Report (in Slovene)]	Mihaljević 72' (pen.)	Stadium: Radomlje Sports Park; Attendance: 50; Referee: Leon Pašalić

23 June 2016 3	Celje (Slovenia)	1–1	(Croatia) Osijek
18:00 CEST (UTC+02:00)	Lovrečič 78'	Report (in Slovene)	Lesjak 81'

25 June 2016 4	Celje (Slovenia)	2–3	(Croatia) Slaven Belupo	Slovenske Konjice
18:00 CEST (UTC+02:00)	Gregurina 2'; Ejupi 14', 16'	Report (in Slovene)	Mlakar 75'; Duspara ( 85'	Stadium: Dobrava Stadium; Attendance: 100; Referee: Vojko Goričan

30 June 2016 5	Celje (Slovenia)	2–2	(Scotland) Celtic	Celje
19:45 CEST (UTC+02:00)	Miškić 28', 49'	Report (in Slovene)	Ciftci 56'; Rogic 74'	Stadium: Arena Petrol

1 July 2016 6	Celje (Slovenia)	1–1	(Croatia) Istra 1961	Bled
18:00 CEST (UTC+02:00)	Križan 39'	Report (in Slovene)	Ljubanović 3'	Stadium: Bled Sports Centre

8 July 2016 6	Celje (Slovenia)	v	(Romania) Dinamo București
--:-- CEST (UTC+02:00)		[Report (in Slovene)]

10 July 2016 7	Celje (Slovenia)	v	(Russia) Ural
--:-- CEST (UTC+02:00)		[Report (in Slovene)]

== Competitions ==
=== Overall ===
Competition	Started round	Current position / round	Final position / round	First match	Last match
PrvaLiga	Pre-season	5th		16 July 2016	27 May 2017
Cup	First round	—	Round of 16	17 August 2016	13 September 2016

Source: Competitions

=== Overview ===
Competition	Record							
Competition	G	W	D	L	GF	GA	GD	Win %
PrvaLiga	21	8	3	10	25	25	+0	38.10
Cup	2	1	1	0	7	2	+5	50.00
Total	23	9	4	10	32	27	+5	39.13

Updated to match played 11 December 2016
Source: Competitions

=== PrvaLiga ===
==== League table ====
Pos	Team	Pld	W	D	L	GF	GA	GD	Pts	Qualification or relegation
3	Olimpija Ljubljana	36	17	9	10	49	35	+14	60 (Note: Gorica ahead of Olimpija on head-to-head record: Olimpija–Gorica 1–0, Gorica–Olimpija 1–1, Olimpija–Gorica 1–2, Gorica–Olimpija 1–0)	Qualification for the Europa League first qualifying round (Note: Domžale qualified for Europa League first qualifying round by winning the 2016–17 Slovenian Football Cup.)
4	Domžale	36	16	8	12	63	45	+18	56	Qualification for the Europa League first qualifying round
5	Celje	36	15	10	11	48	39	+9	55	
6	Koper (R)	36	12	14	10	43	40	+3	50	Relegation to fourth tier (Note: Koper did not get a competition licence and was thus relegated to the fourth division.)
7	Rudar Velenje	36	10	11	15	49	53	−4	41	

Source: PrvaLiga (in Slovene), Soccerway
Rules for classification: 1) Points; 2) Head-to-head points; 3) Head-to-head goal difference; 4) Head-to-head away goals scored; 5) Goal difference; 6) Goals scored; 7) Away goals scored; 8) Fairplay ranking; 9) Draw.
(R) Relegated

==== Results summary ====
Overall								Home						Away					
Pld	W	D	L	GF	GA	GD	Pts	W	D	L	GF	GA	GD	W	D	L	GF	GA	GD
36	15	10	11	48	39	+9	55	6	8	4	19	18	+1	9	2	7	29	21	+8

Last updated: 27 May 2017.
Source: Competitive matches

==== Results by round ====
Round	1	2	3	4	5	6	7	8	9	10	11	12	13	14	15	16	17	18	19	20	21	22	23	24	25	26	27	28	29	30	31	32	33	34	35	36
Ground	A	H	A	A	H	A	H	A	H	H	A	H	H	A	H	A	H	A	A	H	A	A	H	A	H	A	H	H	A	H	H	A	H	A	H	A
Result	L	W	W	L	D	L	L	W	W	L	W	W	D	W	L	L	W	L	L	D	L	D	W	W	D	W	D	D	D	W	D	W	L	W	D	W
Position	7	5	3	4	5	8	9	7	6	6	6	5	5	4	4	4	4	4	4	4	5	5	4	4	5	5	5	5	5	5	5	5	6	5	5	5

Updated to match(es) played on 27 May 2017. Source: Competitive matches
A = Away; H = Home; W = Win; D = Draw; L = Loss

==== Matches ====
Win Draw Loss Fixtures

16 July 2016 1	Olimpija	1–0	Celje	Ljubljana
20:15 CEST (UTC+02:00)	Velikonja 6'; Eleke (yellow card) 82'; Kirm (yellow card) 88'	Report (in Slovene)	Podlogar (yellow card) 8'	Stadium: Stožice Stadium; Attendance: 1,200; Referee: Roberto Ponis

22 July 2016 2	Celje	1–0	Gorica	Celje
18:00 CEST (UTC+02:00)	Čirjak (yellow card) 9', (goal) 46'; Miškić (yellow card) 74'	Report (in Slovene)	Kavčič (yellow card) 60'; Boben (yellow card) 62'	Stadium: Arena Petrol; Attendance: 900; Referee: Nejc Kajtazović

31 July 2016 3	Aluminij	2–4	Celje	Kidričevo
18:15 CEST (UTC+02:00)	Zeba 45'; Kurež 49'; Brodnjak (yellow card) 82'	Report (in Slovene)	I. Hadžić 29', 48'; Lovrečič (yellow card) 37'; Čirjak 53'; Glavaš 77'; Kous (yellow card) 90+1'	Stadium: Kidričevo Sports Park; Attendance: 300; Referee: Damir Skomina

6 August 2016 4	Koper	2–1	Celje	Koper
20:15 CEST (UTC+02:00)	Simčič (yellow card) 23'; Ibričić 30', 86' (pen.); Štromajer (yellow card) 45'; Sikošek (yellow card) 63'; Pučko (yellow card) 79'	Report (in Slovene)	Čirjak 26' (pen.); Šporn (yellow card) 29'; Pišek (yellow card) 59' (red card)	Stadium: Bonifika Stadium; Attendance: 1,000; Referee: Dragoslav Perić

12 August 2016 5	Celje	0–0	Radomlje	Celje
18:15 CEST (UTC+02:00)	Glavaš (yellow card) 76'	Report (in Slovene)	Balić (yellow card) 83'	Stadium: Arena Petrol; Attendance: 650; Referee: Andrej Žnidaršič

21 August 2016 6	Krško	1–0	Celje	Krško
18:15 CEST (UTC+02:00)	Dangubić 41'; Pušaver (yellow card) 75'	Report (in Slovene)	I. Hadžić (yellow card) 85'	Stadium: Matija Gubec Stadium; Attendance: 1,300; Referee: Dragoslav Perić

28 August 2016 7	Celje	0–3	Maribor	Celje
20:15 CEST (UTC+02:00)	Pišek (yellow card) 70'	Report (in Slovene)	Defendi (yellow card) 44'; Pišek 51' (o.g.); Omoregie 71'; Zahović 86'	Stadium: Arena Petrol; Attendance: 2,800; Referee: Bojan Mertik

10 September 2016 8	Rudar	1–3	Celje	Velenje
18:15 CEST (UTC+02:00)	Zec (yellow card) 4'; Glavina 16'; Lotrič (yellow card) 43'; Mužek (yellow card) 55'; Babić (yellow card) 75'; Dodlek (yellow card) 90+2'	Report (in Slovene)	Travner (yellow card) 14'; Volaš 19', 87'; Pungaršek (yellow card) 34'; Vidmajer (yellow card) 36'; Čirjak 79', (yellow card) 79'	Stadium: Ob Jezeru City Stadium; Attendance: 900; Referee: Andrej Žnidaršič

17 September 2016 9	Celje	2–1	Domžale	Celje
16:00 CEST (UTC+02:00)	I. Hadžić 25'; Podlogar (yellow card) 69', (goal) 90+2'; Vidmajer (yellow card) 72'	Report (in Slovene)	Horvat (yellow card) 57'; Dobrovoljc 74'; Širok (yellow card) 85'	Stadium: Arena Petrol; Attendance: 700; Referee: Slavko Vinčić

21 September 2016 10	Celje	0–1	Olimpija	Celje
18:15 CEST (UTC+02:00)	Klemenčič (yellow card) 18'; Pišek (yellow card) 35'; Požek Vancaš (yellow card) 63'; Čirjak (yellow card) 65'	Report (in Slovene)	Kelhar (yellow card) 47'; Zajc 70', (yellow card) 71'; Wobay (yellow card) 83'	Stadium: Arena Petrol; Attendance: 2,900; Referee: Roman Glažar

24 September 2016 11	Gorica	0–1	Celje	Nova Gorica
18:15 CEST (UTC+02:00)	Arčon (yellow card) 24'; Kapić (yellow card) 66'; Grudina (yellow card) 68'; Burgič (yellow card) 85'	Report (in Slovene)	Volaš 24'; Džinić (yellow card) 44'	Stadium: Nova Gorica Sports Park; Attendance: 550; Referee: Roberto Ponis

1 October 2016 12	Celje	1–0	Aluminij	Celje
16:00 CEST (UTC+02:00)	Džinić (yellow card) 7'; Podlogar 37'; Požeg Vancaš (yellow card) 90+2'	Report (in Slovene)	Rogina (yellow card) 23'	Stadium: Arena Petrol; Attendance: 500; Referee: Matej Jug

16 October 2016 13	Celje	1–1	Koper	Celje
16:55 CEST (UTC+02:00)	Pungaršek (yellow card) 20'; D. Hadžić (yellow card) 52'; Pišek (yellow card) 61' (yellow-red card) 74'; Rahmanović 71'	Report (in Slovene)	Teijo (yellow card) 14'; Pučko 21'; Pranjić (yellow card) 62'; Biljan (yellow card) 84'; Ibričić (yellow card) 90+4'	Stadium: Arena Petrol; Attendance: 500; Referee: Mitja Žganec

21 October 2016 14	Radomlje	0–3	Celje	Domžale
19:00 CEST (UTC+02:00)	Osmanaj (yellow card) 10' (yellow-red card) 57'; Kumer (yellow card) 15'; Barukčić (yellow card) 65'; Ivačič (yellow card) 68'	Report (in Slovene)	Podlogar 21'; Pungaršek (yellow card) 26'; Travner 67'; Volaš 70'; Vidmajer (yellow card) 78'	Stadium: Domžale Sports Park; Attendance: 200; Referee: Dragoslav Perić

29 October 2016 15	Celje	0–3	Krško	Celje
15:00 CET (UTC+01:00)	Rahmanović (yellow card) 24'; Volaš (yellow card) 42'; Podlogar (red card) 77'; Travner (yellow card) 89'	Report (in Slovene)	Haljeta 18'; Vuklišević (yellow card) 42'; Dangubić (yellow card) 43', (goal) 45' (pen.), 80'; Pušaver (yellow card) 83'	Stadium: Arena Petrol; Attendance: 400; Referee: Rade Obrenović

5 November 2016 16	Maribor	2–0	Celje	Maribor
20:15 CET (UTC+01:00)	Zahović 62', (yellow card) 86'; Novaković 70'	Report (in Slovene)	Rahmanović (yellow card) 53'	Stadium: Ljudski vrt Attendance: 2,000; Referee: Matej Jug

19 November 2016 17	Celje	4–0	Rudar	Celje
14:00 CET (UTC+01:00)	Volaš 34', 83'; Čirjak 56'; Pungaršek 58'; Travner (yellow card) 63'	Report (in Slovene)	Grgić (yellow card) 32'; Kašnik (yellow card) 55'; Babić (yellow card) 89'	Stadium: Arena Petrol; Attendance: 350; Referee: Rade Obrenović

26 November 2016 18	Domžale	2–1	Celje	Domžale
16:00 CET (UTC+01:00)	Vetrih 18' , (yellow card) 49'; Vuk 50'; Husmani (yellow card) 86'	Report (in Slovene)	Džinić (yellow card) 26'; D. Hadžić (yellow card) 52'; Rahmanović (yellow card) 63'; I. Hadžić (yellow card) 72'; Kous (yellow card) 89'	Stadium: Domžale Sports Park; Attendance: 800; Referee: Nejc Kajtazović

30 November 2016 19	Olimpija	2–1	Celje	Ljubljana
18:00 CET (UTC+01:00)	Klinar (yellow card) 1' (yellow-red card) 49'; Benko 31'; Alves 38', (yellow card) 65'; Delamea Mlinar (yellow card) 51'; Vodišek (yellow card) 89'; Kirm (yellow card) 90+3'	Report (in Slovene)	Rahmanović 64', (yellow card) 90+5'; D. Hadžić (yellow card) 90+5'	Stadium: Stožice Stadium; Attendance: 1,000; Referee: Matej Jug

3 December 2016 20	Celje	1–1	Gorica	Celje
14:00 CET (UTC+01:00)	Pišek (yellow card) 49'; Volaš 63', (yellow card) 89'	Report (in Slovene)	Žigon 41'; Burgić (yellow card) 58'	Stadium: Arena Petrol; Attendance: 300; Referee: Slavko Vinčić

10 December 2016 21	Aluminij	2–1	Celje	Kidričevo
12:00 CET (UTC+01:00)	Cvek (yellow card) 12'; Škoflek 77', 90+2'	Report (in Slovene)	Čirjak (yellow card) 10'; Glavaš (yellow card) 37'; Rahmanović (yellow card) 43'; Volaš 59'	Stadium: Kidričevo Sports Park; Attendance: 200; Referee: Bojan Mertik

26 February 2017 22	Koper	1 - 1	Celje	Koper
16:55 CET (UTC+01:00)	Jan Andrejašič (yellow card) 7'; Džinić 55' (o.g.); Pučko (yellow card) 73'; Ed Kevin Kokorović (yellow card) 79'	Report	Požeg (yellow card) 26'; Pungaršek 41'; Hadžić (yellow card) 54' (yellow-red card); Barišić (yellow card) 57'; Rahmanović (yellow card) 60'	Stadium: Bonifika Stadium; Attendance: 600; Referee: (Slovenia) Rade Obrenović

4 March 2017 23	Celje	1 - 0	Radomlje	Celje
15:00 CET (UTC+01:00)	Pungaršek (yellow card) 38'; Volaš 62'; Požeg (yellow card) 84'	Report	Ejup (yellow card) 23'; Janković (yellow card) 61'; Grega Marinšek (yellow card) 76'	Stadium: Arena Petrol; Attendance: 500; Referee: (Slovenia) Slavko Vinčić

12 March 2017 24	Krško	2 - 3	Celje	Krško
15:00 CET (UTC+01:00)	Dangubić 57' (pen.) (yellow card) 61' (goal) 67' (pen.); Vuklišević (yellow card) 89'	Report	Rahmanović (yellow card) 11' (goal) 59'; Cvek 26'; Travner (yellow card) 33'; Belić 36'; Klemenčič (yellow card) 47'; Volaš (yellow card) 70'; Podlogar (yellow card) 83'	Stadium: Matija Gubec Stadium; Attendance: 600; Referee: (Slovenia) Matej Jug

18 March 2017 25	Celje	1 - 1	Maribor	Celje
20:15 CET (UTC+01:00)	Barišić (yellow card) 5' (yellow-red card); Volaš 45'; Vidmajer (yellow card) 74'	Report	Novaković 6'; Pihler (yellow card) 44'; Vrhovec (yellow card) 58'; Bajde (yellow card) 87'	Stadium: Arena Petrol; Attendance: 3,500; Referee: (Slovenia) Damir Skomina

29 March 2017 26	Rudar Velenje	1 - 2	Celje	Velenje
17:00 CET (UTC+01:00)	Črnčič (yellow card) 27'; Jean-Claude Billong 56' (yellow card) 63'	Report	Rahmanović (yellow card) 21'; Hadžić 60'; Požeg (yellow card) 85'; Podlogar 89'	Stadium: Ob Jezeru City Stadium; Attendance: 600; Referee: (Slovenia) Mitja Žganec

=== Cup ===
==== First round ====
Win Draw Loss Fixtures

17 August 2016 First round	Žiri	0–5	Celje	Žiri
16:00 CEST (UTC+02:00)	Domijan (yellow card) 25'	Report	Podlogar 7', 66'; Džinić 20'; Lovrečič 32'; Šporn (yellow card) 35'; Glavaš 40'; Pišek (yellow card) 67'	Stadium: Polje Stadium; Attendance: 250; Referee: Rade Obrenović

==== Round of 16 ====
13 September 2016 Round of 16	Krško	2–2 (a.e.t.) (3–1 p)	Celje	Krško
18:00 CEST (UTC+02:00)	Džinić 9' (o.g.); Mensah (yellow card) 32'; Pušaver (yellow card) 41'; Kramarič (yellow card) 85'; Zalokar (yellow card) 92'; Jurečič (yellow card) 96'; Dangubić 120'	Report	Džinić (yellow card) 27'; Rahmanović 48', 97'; Hadžić (yellow card) 67'; Volaš (yellow card) 92' (yellow-red card) 117'	Stadium: Matija Gubec Stadium; Attendance: 500; Referee: Darjan Kovačič
	Penalties
	Špiler (penalty scored); Dangubić (penalty scored); Sadiković (penalty scored)		Travner (penalty missed); Džinić (penalty missed); Vidmajer (penalty scored); Kous (penalty missed)

== Statistics ==
=== Goalscorers ===
Slovenian PrvaLiga

8 goals

- (Slovenia) Dalibor Volaš

5 goals

- (Croatia) Lovre Čirjak

4 goals

- (Bosnia and Herzegovina) Irfan Hadžić

3 goals

- (Slovenia) Matej Podlogar

2 goals

- (Bosnia and Herzegovina) Amar Rahmanović

1 goal

- (Slovenia) Jure Travner
- (Slovenia) Nino Pungaršek
- (Croatia) Marin Glavaš

Slovenian Football Cup

2 goals

- (Slovenia) Matej Podlogar
- (Bosnia and Herzegovina) Amar Rahmanović

1 goal

- (Slovenia) Elvedin Džinić
- (Slovenia) Anej Lovrečič
- (Croatia) Marin Glavaš

== See also ==
- 2016–17 Slovenian PrvaLiga
- 2016–17 Slovenian Football Cup
