= 2016–17 ND Gorica season =

Gorica
2016–17 season
- President: Hari Arčon
- Head Coach: Miran Srebrnič
- Stadium: Nova Gorica Sports Park
- Slovenian League: 4th
- Slovenian Cup: Quarter-finals
- Europa League: 1st qualifying round
- Top goalscorer: League: Miran Burgić (7); All: Miran Burgić (7)
- Highest home attendance: 1,000 (vs Maribor & Olimpija)
- Lowest home attendance: 250 (vs Radomlje)
- Average home league attendance: 580
Home colours	Away colours
- All statistics correct as of 13 December 2016.

The 2016–17 season is Gorica's 26th season in the Slovenian PrvaLiga, Slovenian top division, since the league was created in 1991 with Gorica as one of the league's founding members. Gorica compete in Slovenian PrvaLiga, Slovenian Football Cup and UEFA Europa League.

== Players ==
As of 13 December 2016

Note: Flags indicate national team as defined under FIFA eligibility rules; some limited exceptions apply. Players may hold more than one non-FIFA nationality.

No.	Pos.	Nation	Player
—	GK	SLO	Gregor Sorčan
—	GK	SLO	Jure Lipičar
—	GK	SLO	Januš Štrukelj
—	DF	SLO	Uroš Celcer
—	DF	SLO	Matija Škarabot
—	DF	SLO	Miha Gregorič
—	DF	SLO	Tine Kavčič
—	DF	SLO	Alen Jogan (captain)
—	DF	SLO	Jani Curk
—	DF	SLO	Matija Boben
—	DF	SLO	Matic Slavec
—	MF	SLO	Andrej Kotnik
—	MF	BIH	Rifet Kapić

No.	Pos.	Nation	Player
—	MF	SLO	Jaka Kolenc
—	MF	SLO	Rok Grudina
—	MF	SLO	Dejan Žigon
—	MF	SLO	Jan Humar
—	MF	SLO	Amel Džuzdanović
—	FW	USA	Sachem Wilson
—	FW	SLO	Miran Burgič
—	FW	SLO	Sandi Arčon
—	FW	NGR	Bede Amarachi Osuji
—	FW	SLO	Leon Marinič
—	FW	ITA	Gianluca Franciosi
—	FW	SLO	Tilen Nagode

Source:ND Gorica

== Pre-season and friendlies ==
=== Summer ===
22 June 2016 1	Gorica (Slovenia)	0–0	(Croatia) Istra	Nova Gorica
18:00 CEST (UTC+02:00)		Report (in Slovene)		Stadium: Nova Gorica Sports Park; Attendance: 100; Referee: Osman Hajdič

25 June 2016 2	Gorica (Slovenia)	0–0	(Croatia) Rijeka	Kranjska Gora
17:30 CEST (UTC+02:00)		Report (in Slovene)		Stadium: Ruteč Sports Park; Referee: Marko Podgoršek

== Competitions ==
=== Overall ===
Competition	Started round	Current position / round	Final position / round	First match	Last match
PrvaLiga	Pre-season	4th		16 July 2016	27 May 2017
Cup	Round of 16	—	Quarter-finals	15 September 2016	26 October 2016
UEFA Europa League	First qualifying round	—	First qualifying round	30 June 2016	7 July 2016

Updated to match played 13 December 2016
Source: Competitions

=== Overview ===
Competition	Record							
Competition	G	W	D	L	GF	GA	GD	Win %
PrvaLiga	21	7	7	7	24	24	+0	33.33
Cup	3	1	2	0	4	2	+2	33.33
Europa League	2	0	0	2	0	4	−4	0.00
Total	26	8	9	9	28	30	−2	30.77

Updated to match played 13 December 2016
Source: Competitions

=== PrvaLiga ===
==== League table ====
Pos	Team	Pld	W	D	L	GF	GA	GD	Pts	Qualification or relegation
1	Maribor (C)	36	21	10	5	63	30	+33	73	Qualification for the Champions League second qualifying round
2	Gorica	36	16	12	8	48	39	+9	60 (Note: Gorica ahead of Olimpija on head-to-head record: Olimpija–Gorica 1–0, Gorica–Olimpija 1–1, Olimpija–Gorica 1–2, Gorica–Olimpija 1–0)	Qualification for the Europa League first qualifying round (Note: Domžale qualified for Europa League first qualifying round by winning the 2016–17 Slovenian Football Cup.)
3	Olimpija Ljubljana	36	17	9	10	49	35	+14	60	Qualification for the Europa League first qualifying round
4	Domžale	36	16	8	12	63	45	+18	56	Qualification for the Europa League first qualifying round
5	Celje	36	15	10	11	48	39	+9	55	

Source: PrvaLiga (in Slovene), Soccerway
Rules for classification: 1) Points; 2) Head-to-head points; 3) Head-to-head goal difference; 4) Head-to-head away goals scored; 5) Goal difference; 6) Goals scored; 7) Away goals scored; 8) Fairplay ranking; 9) Draw.
(C) Champions

==== Results summary ====
Overall								Home						Away					
Pld	W	D	L	GF	GA	GD	Pts	W	D	L	GF	GA	GD	W	D	L	GF	GA	GD
36	16	12	8	48	39	+9	60	8	7	3	26	18	+8	8	5	5	22	21	+1

Last updated: 27 May 2017.
Source: Competitive matches

==== Results by round ====
Round	1	2	3	4	5	6	7	8	9	10	11	12	13	14	15	16	17	18	19	20	21	22	23	24	25	26	27	28	29	30	31	32	33	34	35	36
Ground	H	A	H	A	H	A	H	A	H	A	H	A	H	A	H	A	H	A	H	A	H	A	H	A	H	A	H	A	H	A	H	A	H	A	H	A
Result	W	L	W	L	W	W	W	L	D	D	L	W	D	L	L	L	D	D	W	D	D	W	L	W	W	W	D	W	D	W	D	D	W	D	W	W
Position	2	4	4	5	3	2	1	2	3	4	4	4	4	5	5	5	5	6	5	5	4	4	5	5	4	4	4	4	4	4	4	4	4	4	2	2

Updated to match(es) played on 27 May 2017. Source: Competitive matches
A = Away; H = Home; W = Win; D = Draw; L = Loss

==== Matches ====
Win Draw Loss Fixtures

17 July 2016 1	Gorica	2–0	Aluminij	Nova Gorica
18:15 CEST (UTC+02:00)	Arčon 30'; Kavčič 50', (yellow card) 66'; Kolenc (yellow card) 90+3'	Report (in Slovene)	Turkalj (yellow card) 74'; Roškar (yellow card) 87' (yellow-red card) 90+2'	Stadium: Nova Gorica Sports Park; Attendance: 500; Referee: Mitja Žganec

22 July 2016 2	Celje	1–0	Gorica	Celje
18:00 CEST (UTC+02:00)	Čirjak (yellow card) 9', (goal) 46'; Miškić (yellow card) 74'	Report (in Slovene)	Kavčič (yellow card) 60'; Boben (yellow card) 62'	Stadium: Arena Petrol; Attendance: 900; Referee: Nejc Kajtazović

30 July 2016 3	Gorica	2–1	Radomlje	Nova Gorica
20:15 CEST (UTC+02:00)	Grudina (yellow card) 36'; Kolenc (yellow card) 59'; Arčon 85', 90'	Report (in Slovene)	Kovjenič (yellow card) 11'; Karamatić (yellow card) 18'; Jugovar (yellow card) 76'; Nunić 78'; Jazbec (yellow card) 90+3'	Stadium: Nova Gorica Sports Park; Attendance: 350; Referee: Roman Glažar

6 August 2016 4	Krško	1–0	Gorica	Krško
18:15 CEST (UTC+02:00)	Šturm (yellow card) 10'; Kramarič 60', (yellow card) 78'; Drnovšek (yellow card) 67'; Vukliševič (yellow card) 74'; Čeh (yellow card) 84'	Report (in Slovene)	Celcer (yellow card) 39'; Burgič (yellow card) 90'	Stadium: Matija Gubec Stadium; Attendance: 1,100; Referee: Asmir Sagrković

13 August 2016 5	Gorica	2–1	Maribor	Nova Gorica
17:55 CEST (UTC+02:00)	Šuler 42' (o.g.); Burgić 67'	Report (in Slovene)	Defendi (yellow card) 13'; Bajde 56'; Vrhovec (yellow card) 62'; Janža (yellow card) 83'	Stadium: Nova Gorica Sports Park; Attendance: 1,000; Referee: Damir Skomina

20 August 2016 6	Rudar	1–2	Gorica	Velenje
18:15 CEST (UTC+02:00)	Billong (yellow card) 4'; Glavina 25'; Mary (yellow card) 89'	Report (in Slovene)	Burgič (yellow card) 33'; Žigon 37'; Kapić 89'	Stadium: Ob Jezeru City Stadium; Attendance: 500; Referee: Rade Obrenović

26 August 2016 7	Gorica	3–1	Domžale	Nova Gorica
20:15 CEST (UTC+02:00)	Arčon 6', 74'; Nagode (yellow card) 47'; Kapić 82'	Report (in Slovene)	Morel (yellow card) 11'; Dobrovoljc (yellow card) 40'; Bratanović 61'	Stadium: Nova Gorica Sports Park; Attendance: 730; Referee: Vojko Goričan

11 September 2016 8	Olimpija	1–0	Gorica	Ljubljana
16:55 CEST (UTC+02:00)	Matić (yellow card) 36'; Velikonja 87' (pen.)	Report (in Slovene)	Jogan (yellow card) 24'; Grudina (yellow card) 74'; Kavčič (yellow card) 80'	Stadium: Stožice Stadium; Attendance: 3,800; Referee: Nejc Kajtazović

28 September 2016 9	Gorica	1–1	Koper	Nova Gorica
18:15 CEST (UTC+02:00)	Gregorič 29'	Report (in Slovene)	Štromajer (yellow card) 6'; Ibričić 45'	Stadium: Nova Gorica Sports Park; Attendance: 700; Referee: Bojan Mertik

21 September 2016 10	Aluminij	0–0	Gorica	Kidričevo
16:00 CEST (UTC+02:00)	Krljanović (yellow card) 58'; Vrbanec (yellow card) 83'	Report (in Slovene)	Kapić (yellow card) 59'	Stadium: Kidričevo Sports Park; Attendance: 100; Referee: Dejan Balažič

24 September 2016 11	Gorica	0–1	Celje	Nova Gorica
18:15 CEST (UTC+02:00)	Arčon (yellow card) 24'; Kapić (yellow card) 66'; Grudina (yellow card) 68'; Burgič (yellow card) 85'	Report (in Slovene)	Volaš 24'; Džinić (yellow card) 44'	Stadium: Nova Gorica Sports Park; Attendance: 550; Referee: Roberto Ponis

2 October 2016 12	Radomlje	2–4	Gorica	Domžale
19:00 CEST (UTC+02:00)	Cerar (yellow card) 50'; Kovjenić (yellow card) 62'; Balić (yellow card) 64'; Šipek 79'; Nunić 81'; Anđelković (red card) 83'	Report (in Slovene)	Burgič 18' (pen.), 63' (pen.), (yellow card) 54'; Nagode 24'; Kapić 84' (pen.); Curk (yellow card) 87'	Stadium: Domžale Sports Park; Attendance: 400; Referee: Andrej Žnidaršič

14 October 2016 13	Gorica	1–1	Krško	Nova Gorica
20:00 CEST (UTC+02:00)	Nagode (yellow card) 17'; Kolenc (yellow card) 28'; Kotnik 51'; Arčon (yellow card) 63'; Gregorič (yellow card) 90'	Report (in Slovene)	Dangubić 30'; Kramarič (yellow card) 59'; Čeh (yellow card) 65'	Stadium: Nova Gorica Sports Park; Attendance: 500; Referee: Nejc Kajtazović

22 October 2016 14	Maribor	1–0	Gorica	Maribor
20:15 CEST (UTC+02:00)	Šuler 47'	Report (in Slovene)		Stadium: Ljudski vrt Attendance: 3,500; Referee: Dejan Balažič

30 October 2016 15	Gorica	1–3	Rudar	Nova Gorica
18:00 CET (UTC+01:00)	Arčon (yellow card) 10'; Burgič 80' (pen.)	Report (in Slovene)	Lotrič 48'; Glavina 55'; Kašnik (yellow card) 78'; Mary 85'; Vručina (yellow card) 90+4'	Stadium: Nova Gorica Sports Park; Attendance: 400; Referee: Andrej Žnidaršič

5 November 2016 16	Domžale	5–0	Gorica	Domžale
18:00 CET (UTC+01:00)	Horvat 22'; Alvir 30', 34', 90+2' (pen.); Žinko (yellow card) 37'; Vuk 56'	Report (in Slovene)	Boben (yellow card) 90+2'; Kotnik (yellow card) 90+2'	Stadium: Domžale Sports Park; Attendance: 500; Referee: Vojko Goričan

19 November 2016 17	Gorica	1–1	Olimpija	Nova Gorica
20:15 CET (UTC+01:00)	Burgič (yellow card) 64', (goal) 81'	Report (in Slovene)	Benko 12'; Zajc (yellow card) 48'; Jurčević (yellow card) 72'; Krefl (yellow card) 86'; Kronaveter (yellow card) 90+6'	Stadium: Nova Gorica Sports Park; Attendance: 1,000; Referee: Roberto Ponis

26 November 2016 18	Koper	0–0	Gorica	Koper
18:00 CET (UTC+01:00)		Report (in Slovene)	Boben (yellow card) 56'; Škarabot (yellow card) 90+3'	Stadium: Bonifika Stadium; Attendance: 600; Referee: Dejan Balažič

30 November 2016 19	Gorica	3–0	Aluminij	Nova Gorica
16:00 CET (UTC+01:00)	Gregorič (yellow card) 62'; Kapić 80'; Burgić 87' (pen.), 90+1'; Jogn (yellow card) 89'	Report (in Slovene)	Vrbanec (yellow card) 8'; Tahiraj (yellow card) 36'; Cvek (yellow card) 76'	Stadium: Nova Gorica Sports Park; Attendance: 400; Referee: Asmir Sagrković

3 December 2016 20	Celje	1–1	Gorica	Celje
14:00 CET (UTC+01:00)	Pišek (yellow card) 49'; Volaš 63', (yellow card) 89'	Report (in Slovene)	Žigon 41'; Burgić (yellow card) 58'	Stadium: Arena Petrol; Attendance: 300; Referee: Slavko Vinčić

10 December 2016 21	Gorica	1–1	Radomlje	Nova Gorica
14:00 CET (UTC+01:00)	Curk (yellow card) 39'; Škarabot (yellow card) 49'; Kotnik 80'	Report (in Slovene)	Karamatić 30'; Lidjan (yellow card) 55'; Jugovar (yellow card) 88'	Stadium: Nova Gorica Sports Park; Attendance: 250; Referee: Voljko Goričan

26 February 2017 22	Krško	1 - 2	Gorica	Krško
15:00 CET (UTC+01:00)	Krajcer (yellow card) 74'; Ibrahim Mensah 82'	Report	Škarabot (yellow card) 22'; Rok Grudina (yellow card) 39' (goal) 88'; Burgić 44' (pen.); Rifet Kapić (yellow card) 46'; Gregorič (yellow card) 59'	Stadium: Matija Gubec Stadium; Attendance: 600; Referee: (Slovenia) Slavko Vinčić

=== Cup ===
==== Round of 16 ====
Win Draw Loss

15 September 2016 Round of 16	Nafta 1903	1–3	Gorica	Lendava
18:00 CEST (UTC+02:00)	Kapić 39' (o.g.); Malešević (yellow card) 50'	Report	Burgić 40'; Kotnik 71'; Arčon (yellow card) 90'; Franciosi 90+3'	Stadium: Lendava Sports Park; Attendance: 800; Referee: Roman Glažar

==== Quarter-finals ====
19 October 2016 First leg	Gorica	1–1	Maribor	Nova Gorica
18:00 CEST (UTC+02:00)	Grudina (yellow card) 31'; Celcer (yellow card) 34'; Kotnik 58'	Report	Zahović 44'; Hotić (yellow card) 62'; Sallalich (yellow card) 71'; Mezga (yellow card) 89'	Stadium: Sports Park; Attendance: 700; Referee: Dragoslav Perić

26 October 2016 Second leg	Maribor	0–0 (1–1 (a) agg.)	Gorica	Maribor
17:15 CEST (UTC+02:00)	Šme (yellow card) 33'; Sallalich (yellow card) 48'; Hotić (yellow card) 55'; Obradović (yellow card) 90+2'	Report	Kolenc (yellow card) 22'; Burgić (yellow card) 45'	Stadium: Ljudski vrt Attendance: 3,000; Referee: Damir Skomina

=== UEFA Europa League ===
==== First qualifying round ====
Win Draw Loss

30 June 2016 First leg	Maccabi Tel Aviv (Israel)	3–0	(Slovenia) Gorica	Netanya
19:15 CEST (UTC+02:00)	Igiebor 13', 69'; Sá 45'	Report	Škarabot (yellow card) 10'	Stadium: Netanya Stadium; Attendance: 7,982; Referee: Jonathan Lardot (Belgium)

7 July 2016 Second leg	Gorica (Slovenia)	0–1 (0–4 agg.)	(Israel) Maccabi Tel Aviv	Nova Gorica
18:30 CEST (UTC+02:00)		Report	Benayoun 10'; Ben Haim (yellow card) 73'	Stadium: Sports Park; Attendance: 700; Referee: Manuel Schüttengruber (Austria)

== Statistics ==
=== Goalscorers ===
Slovenian PrvaLiga

7 goals

- (Slovenia) Miran Burgić

5 goals

- (Slovenia) Sandi Arčon

4 goals

- (Bosnia and Herzegovina) Rifet Kapić

2 goals

- (Slovenia) Andrej Kotnik
- (Slovenia) Dejan Žigon

1 goal

- (Slovenia) Sandi Arčon
- (Slovenia) Tine Kavčič
- (Slovenia) Miha Gregorič

Slovenian Football Cup

2 goals

- (Slovenia) Andrej Kotnik

1 goal

- (Slovenia) Miran Burgić
- (Italy) Gianluca Franciosi

== See also ==
- 2016–17 Slovenian PrvaLiga
- 2016–17 Slovenian Football Cup
- 2016–17 UEFA Europa League
