= 2019–20 Slovenian Football Cup =

Tournament details
- Country: Slovenia
- Teams: 28

Final positions
- Champions: Mura (1st title)
- Runners-up: Nafta 1903

Tournament statistics
- Matches played: 31
- Goals scored: 116 (3.74 per match)
- Top goal scorer: Dare Vršič (six goals)

The 2019–20 Slovenian Football Cup was the 29th edition of the football knockout competition in Slovenia. The winners of the cup, Mura, earned a place in the first qualifying round of the 2020–21 UEFA Europa League. The tournament began on 14 August 2019 and ended on 24 June 2020 with the final.

Olimpija Ljubljana were the defending champions after winning the previous season's final, defeating Maribor with a score of 2–1.

== Competition format ==
Round	Draw date	Match date	Fixtures	Clubs	Format details
First round	21 June 2019	14/15 August 2019	12	24 → 12	18 clubs that have qualified through MNZ Regional Cups + 6 clubs from the 2018–19 PrvaLiga that didn't qualify for UEFA competitions entered at this stage and were drawn into 12 pairs. Teams that have qualified from the same regional cup could not be drawn against each other. The twelve winners were decided over one leg, with extra time and penalties if scores were level. Lower-level teams were the hosts. If both teams from a pair were from the same level, the home team was determined by the draw.
Round of 16	20 August 2019	11–19 September 2019	8	12+4 → 8	12 first round winners were joined by four 2018–19 PrvaLiga teams that qualified for UEFA competitions, and were drawn into 8 pairs. Teams that have qualified from the same regional cup could not be drawn against each other. The eight winners were decided over one leg, with extra time and penalties if scores were level. Lower-level teams were the hosts. If both teams from a pair were from the same level, the home team was determined by the draw.
Quarter-finals	27 September 2019	16–30 October 2019	4	8 → 4	8 teams were drawn into 4 pairs. The four winners were decided over two legs on home and away basis with away goals rule being used. In case of a tie, extra time and penalties were used.
Semi-finals	19 December 2019	9/10 June 2020	2	4 → 2	4 teams were drawn into 2 pairs. The two winners were decided over a single match. In case of a tie, extra time and penalties were used.
Final	N/A	24 June 2020	1	2 → 1	Winner was decided in a single game at a venue that was announced by the Football Association of Slovenia. Extra time and penalties would be used if the score would be level. The winners have qualified for the 2020–21 UEFA Europa League first qualifying round.

== Qualified teams ==
=== 2018–19 Slovenian PrvaLiga members ===
- Aluminij
- Celje
- Domžale
- Gorica
- Krško
- Maribor
- Mura
- Olimpija
- Rudar Velenje
- Triglav Kranj

=== Qualified through MNZ Regional Cups ===
- 2018–19 MNZ Celje Cup: Šampion and Brežice 1919
- 2018–19 MNZ Koper Cup: Koper and Tabor Sežana
- 2018–19 MNZG-Kranj Cup: Bled and Šenčur
- 2018–19 MNZ Lendava Cup: Odranci and Nafta 1903
- 2018–19 MNZ Ljubljana Cup: Radomlje and Bravo
- 2018–19 MNZ Maribor Cup: Pesnica and Dobrovce
- 2018–19 MNZ Murska Sobota Cup: Grad and Beltinci
- 2018–19 MNZ Nova Gorica Cup: Tolmin and Brda
- 2018–19 MNZ Ptuj Cup: Videm and Bistrica

== First round ==
Twelve first round matches were played on 14–15 August 2019.

14 August 2019	Videm (3)	1–4	Tabor Sežana (1)	Videm pri Ptuju
16:00 CEST	Lovenjak 39'	Report	Požrl 19'; Milošev 49', 64', 71'	Stadium: Videm Sports Park; Attendance: 150; Referee: Dejan Vivod

14 August 2019	Bistrica (3)	2–2 (a.e.t.) (3–4 p)	Brda (2)	Slovenska Bistrica
16:00 CEST	Jelenko 25', 72'	Report	Perše 36', 44'	Stadium: Slovenska Bistrica Sports Park; Attendance: 150; Referee: Samo Veselič
	Penalties
	Mrkaljević (penalty scored); Lipoglav (penalty scored); Korošec (penalty scored)		(penalty scored) Bužinel; (penalty scored) Frelih; (penalty scored) Celcer; (penalty scored) Musić

14 August 2019	Bled (3)	1–3	Celje (1)	Bled
16:00 CEST	Stanko 65' (pen.)	Report	Novak 5'; Kerin 19'; I. Božić 35'	Stadium: Bledec Sports Park; Attendance: 300; Referee: Dejan Balažič

14 August 2019	Brežice 1919 (2)	1–2	Triglav Kranj (1)	Brežice
16:00 CEST	D. Božič 63'	Report	Hervol 12' (o.g.); Jašaragič 29'	Stadium: Brežice Stadium; Attendance: 300; Referee: Mihael Antič

14 August 2019	Grad (4)	1–4	Krško (2)	Grad
16:00 CEST	Stošić 76' (pen.)	Report	Žabec 56', 86'; Dadić 88'; Čirjak 90'	Stadium: Igrišče Pod gradom Attendance: 200; Referee: Alen Borošak

14 August 2019	Pesnica (4)	1–5	Gorica (2)	Pesnica pri Mariboru
16:00 CEST	Pešl 62'	Report	Colley 24', 60'; Trivunović 44'; Marinič 82', 88'	Stadium: Igrišče Pesnica; Attendance: 250; Referee: Miran Bukovec

14 August 2019	Odranci (3)	1–3	Aluminij (1)	Odranci
16:00 CEST	Hartman 64'	Report	Živković 7'; Leko 43', 73'	Stadium: ŠRC Odranci; Attendance: 200; Referee: Marko Lacković

14 August 2019	Tolmin (3)	3–2	Šampion (3)	Tolmin
16:00 CEST	Lesjak 3'; Perše 27'; Debenjak 90+3'	Report	Mihalič 54'; Marko 60'	Stadium: Brajda Sports Park; Attendance: 200; Referee: David Šmajc

14 August 2019	Šenčur (3)	0–1	Nafta 1903 (2)	Šenčur
16:00 CEST		Report	Vinko 90+3'	Stadium: Šenčur Sports Park; Attendance: 150; Referee: Božo Kondić

14 August 2019	Dobrovce (4)	0–10	Radomlje (2)	Dobrovce
16:00 CEST		Report	Ahačič 25', 88'; Stariha Laban 27'; Marinšek 31', 61'; Pišek 45' (pen.); Poglajen 57'; Gojak 67'; Nikolić 68', 73'	Stadium: Igrišče Dobrovce; Attendance: 200; Referee: Denis Halilović

14 August 2019	Koper (2)	6–0	Beltinci (2)	Koper
18:00 CEST	Vršič 9' (pen.), 52' (pen.); Tomić 33'; Badžim 61'; Mišić 79'; Šolaja 87'	Report		Stadium: Bonifika Stadium; Attendance: 500; Referee: Blaž Kos

15 August 2019	Bravo (1)	1–4 (a.e.t.)	Rudar Velenje (1)	Ljubljana
16:00 CEST	Nukić 74'	Report	Petrović 30'; Krefl 95'; Tomašević 107'; Radić 111'	Stadium: Šiška Sports Park; Attendance: 550; Referee: Marko Podgoršek

== Round of 16 ==
Eight round of 16 matches were played on 11–19 September 2019.

11 September 2019	Tolmin (3)	0–6	Celje (1)	Tolmin
15:30 CEST		Report	Benedičič 17'; Božić 32'; Kerin 49', 80'; Koritnik 62'; Novak 74'	Stadium: Brajda Sports Park; Attendance: 280; Referee: Mihael Antič

11 September 2019	Radomlje (2)	3–2 (a.e.t.)	Gorica (2)	Radomlje
15:30 CEST	Varga 38'; Pišek 43'; Marjanović 104' (o.g.)	Report	Osuji 23'; Colley 35'	Stadium: Radomlje Sports Park; Attendance: 300; Referee: Roman Glažar

11 September 2019	Nafta 1903 (2)	2–0	Krško (2)	Lendava
18:00 CEST	Oštrek 10', 89'	Report		Stadium: Lendava Sports Park; Attendance: 400; Referee: Marko Lacković

18 September 2019	Triglav Kranj (1)	1–3	Mura (1)	Kranj
15:30 CEST	Mlakar 90'	Report	Maroša 16', 37'; Mulić 24'	Stadium: Stanko Mlakar Stadium; Attendance: 250; Referee: Rade Obrenović

18 September 2019	Brda (2)	0–3	Domžale (1)	Dobrovo
15:30 CEST		Report	Jazbar 42' (o.g.); Vuk 56'; Lazarević 66'	Stadium: Vipolže Stadium; Attendance: 100; Referee: Aleksandar Matković

18 September 2019	Koper (2)	3–2	Maribor (1)	Koper
16:30 CEST	Vršič 9', 74'; Bešir 63'	Report	Kotnik 45'; Bešir 81' (o.g.)	Stadium: Bonifika Stadium; Attendance: 3,200; Referee: Asmir Sagrković

18 September 2019	Aluminij (1)	1–0	Tabor Sežana (1)	Kidričevo
17:00 CEST	Vrbanec 57'	Report		Stadium: Aluminij Sports Park; Attendance: 300; Referee: Dragoslav Perić

19 September 2019	Olimpija Ljubljana (1)	0–1	Rudar Velenje (1)	Ljubljana
16:30 CEST		Report	Trifković 79'	Stadium: Stožice Stadium; Attendance: 500; Referee: Bojan Mertik

== Quarter-finals ==
Four quarter-final match-ups were played over two legs from 16 to 30 October 2019.

=== First leg ===
16 October 2019	Aluminij (1)	1–0	Koper (2)	Kidričevo
17:00 CEST	Klepač 73'	Report		Stadium: Aluminij Sports Park; Attendance: 400; Referee: Alen Borošak

16 October 2019	Nafta 1903 (2)	2–1	Rudar Velenje (1)	Lendava
19:00 CEST	Ploj 49'; Oštrek 65'	Report	Džinić 72'	Stadium: Lendava Sports Park; Attendance: 500; Referee: Slavko Vinčić

22 October 2019	Celje (1)	1–1	Radomlje (2)	Celje
17:00 CEST	Božić 23'	Report	Guček 83'	Stadium: Stadion Z'dežele; Attendance: 550; Referee: Aleksandar Matković

24 October 2019	Domžale (1)	3–2	Mura (1)	Domžale
17:00 CEST	Vujadinović 32'; Podlogar 57'; Vuk 76'	Report	Kouter 18'; Šušnjara 90+5'	Stadium: Domžale Sports Park; Attendance: 550; Referee: Matej Jug

=== Second leg ===
29 October 2019	Radomlje (2)	0–0 (1a–1 agg.)	Celje (1)	Radomlje
13:30 CET		Report		Stadium: Radomlje Sports Park; Attendance: 450; Referee: Dragoslav Perić

29 October 2019	Koper (2)	3–2 (3–3a agg.)	Aluminij (1)	Koper
16:30 CET	Vršič 2' (pen.), 78' (pen.); Žužek 32'	Report	Jakšić 28'; Klepač 54'	Stadium: Bonifika Stadium; Attendance: 600; Referee: Darjan Kovačič

30 October 2019	Rudar Velenje (1)	0–2 (1–4 agg.)	Nafta 1903 (2)	Velenje
16:30 CET		Report	Rebernik 27'; Paku 90+3'	Stadium: Ob Jezeru; Attendance: 200; Referee: Mitja Žganec

30 October 2019	Mura (1)	3–2 (a.e.t.) (5–5 agg.) (5–4 p)	Domžale (1)	Murska Sobota
19:30 CET	Bubnjar 24', 58'; Cipot 90'	Report	Jakupović 33', 40'	Stadium: Fazanerija City Stadium; Attendance: 2,400; Referee: David Šmajc

== Semi-finals ==
Two semi-final matches were played on 9 and 10 June 2020. The semi-final round was originally scheduled to be played over two legs, but due to the COVID-19 pandemic, it was decided that both matches would be played in a single leg format and on a neutral venue at the Brdo National Football Centre, the home of the Football Association of Slovenia.

9 June 2020	Aluminij (1)	0–4	Mura (1)	Predoslje
17:30 CEST		Report	Šušnjara 15'; Bobičanec 55', 83' (pen.); Maroša 63'	Stadium: NNC Brdo; Attendance: 80; Referee: Dejan Balažič
Note: Originally scheduled to be held over two legs on 18 March and 8 April 2020

10 June 2020	Radomlje (2)	1–1 (a.e.t.) (2–4 p)	Nafta 1903 (2)	Predoslje
17:30 CEST	Cerar 51' (pen.)	Report	Novinič 12'	Stadium: NNC Brdo; Attendance: 70; Referee: David Šmajc
	Penalties
	Štromajer (penalty missed); Nuhanović (penalty scored); Jakovljević (penalty missed); Cerar (penalty scored)		(penalty scored) Novinič; (penalty scored) Pirtovšek; (penalty scored) Živko; (penalty scored) Paku
Note: Originally scheduled to be held over two legs on 18 March and 8 April 2020

== Final ==
The final was originally scheduled for 20 May 2020.

24 June 2020
17:30 CEST

Nafta 1903 (2)	0–2	Mura (1)
	Report	Maroša 48'; Karničnik 73'

NNC Brdo, Predoslje
Attendance: 200
Referee: Rade Obrenović

== See also ==
- 2019–20 Slovenian PrvaLiga
