= 2019–20 Slovenian PrvaLiga =

Slovenian PrvaLiga
- Season: 2019–20
- Dates: 13 July 2019 – 22 July 2020
- Champions: Celje (1st title)
- Relegated: Rudar Velenje; Triglav
- Champions League: Celje
- Europa League: Maribor; Olimpija Ljubljana; Mura
- Matches: 180
- Goals: 544 (3.02 per match)
- Best player: Mitja Lotrič
- Top goalscorer: Ante Vukušić (26 goals)
- Biggest home win: Aluminij 8–1 Triglav
- Biggest away win: Triglav 0–6 Celje
- Highest scoring: Triglav 3–7 Olimpija
- Longest winning run: 6 matches Bravo and Maribor
- Longest unbeaten run: 11 matches Bravo
- Longest winless run: 36 matches Rudar Velenje
- Longest losing run: 8 matches Rudar Velenje
- Highest attendance: 9,000; Maribor 1–1 Olimpija
- Lowest attendance: N/A^{a}
- Total attendance: 185,693^{a}
- Average attendance: 1,043^{a}

The 2019–20 Slovenian PrvaLiga was the 29th edition of the Slovenian PrvaLiga since its establishment in 1991. The season began on 13 July 2019 and was scheduled to end on 15 May 2020. The league was halted on 12 March 2020 due to the COVID-19 pandemic in Slovenia, and later resumed on 15 June 2020. Celje won their first-ever league title and earned a place in the first qualifying round of the 2020–21 UEFA Champions League.

Maribor were the defending champions.

== Competition format ==
Each team played 36 matches (18 home and 18 away). Teams played four matches against each other (2 home and 2 away).

== Teams ==
Gorica and Krško were relegated at the end of the previous season. Bravo and Tabor Sežana joined the other eight teams in the league this season after earning promotion from the Slovenian Second League.

=== Stadiums and locations ===
The stadiums mostly have seating capacity only, although some stadiums also have standing areas.

Aluminij	Bravo	Celje	Domžale
Aluminij Sports Park	Šiška Sports Park	Stadion Z'dežele	Domžale Sports Park
Capacity: 600	Capacity: 2,308	Capacity: 13,059	Capacity: 3,100
Maribor	2019–20 Slovenian PrvaLiga is located in Slovenia		Mura
Ljudski vrt	2019–20 Slovenian PrvaLiga is located in Slovenia		Fazanerija City Stadium
Capacity: 12,702	2019–20 Slovenian PrvaLiga is located in Slovenia		Capacity: 4,506
Olimpija Ljubljana	Rudar Velenje	Tabor Sežana	Triglav Kranj
Stožice Stadium	Ob Jezeru City Stadium	Rajko Štolfa Stadium	Stanko Mlakar Stadium
Capacity: 16,038	Capacity: 1,864	Capacity: 1,310	Capacity: 2,060

=== Personnel and kits ===
Team	Manager	Captain	Kit manufacturer	Shirt sponsor
Aluminij	(Austria) Slobodan Grubor	(Slovenia) Matic Vrbanec	Zeus Sport	Talum, Zavarovalnica Sava
Bravo	(Slovenia) Dejan Grabić	(Nigeria) Ovbokha Agboyi	Joma	Nomago
Celje	(Slovenia) Dušan Kosič	(Slovenia) Mitja Lotrič	Nike	Cinkarna, Droga
Domžale	(Slovenia) Dejan Djuranović	(Bosnia and Herzegovina) Senijad Ibričić	Joma	Esad Mulalić s.p.
Maribor	(Bosnia and Herzegovina) Sergej Jakirović	(Brazil) Marcos Tavares	Adidas	Zavarovalnica Sava, Nova KBM, Radio City
Mura	(Slovenia) Ante Šimundža	(Slovenia) Alen Kozar	Adidas	Pomgrad, Generali
Olimpija Ljubljana	(Croatia) Dino Skender	(Bosnia and Herzegovina) Tomislav Tomić	Nike	Merkur zavarovalnica
Rudar Velenje	(Slovenia) Dominik Beršnjak	(Slovenia) Damjan Trifković	Joma	None
Tabor Sežana	(Italy) Mauro Camoranesi	(Croatia) Antonio Azinović	Erreà	CherryBox24
Triglav Kranj	(Serbia) Vlado Šmit	(Slovenia) Luka Majcen	Adidas	Domplan

=== Managerial changes ===
Team	Outgoing manager	Date of vacancy	Position in table	Incoming manager	Date of appointment
Rudar Velenje	(Slovenia) Almir Sulejmanović	29 July 2019	7th	(Slovenia) Janez Žilnik	29 July 2019
Domžale	(Slovenia) Simon Rožman	3 September 2019	10th	(Slovenia) Andrej Razdrh	5 September 2019
Tabor Sežana	(Slovenia) Andrej Razdrh	4 September 2019	6th	(Slovenia) Almir Sulejmanović	8 September 2019
Rudar Velenje	(Slovenia) Janez Žilnik	6 September 2019	10th	(Croatia) Nikola Jaroš	6 September 2019
Triglav Kranj	(Slovenia) Dejan Dončić	23 September 2019	9th	(Serbia) Vlado Šmit	23 September 2019
Rudar Velenje	(Croatia) Nikola Jaroš	29 October 2019	10th	(Croatia) Andrej Panadić	29 October 2019
Tabor Sežana	(Slovenia) Almir Sulejmanović	3 January 2020	8th	(Italy) Mauro Camoranesi	3 January 2020
Maribor	(Slovenia) Darko Milanič	7 March 2020	4th	(Bosnia and Herzegovina) Sergej Jakirović	23 April 2020
Rudar Velenje	(Croatia) Andrej Panadić	20 April 2020	10th	(Slovenia) Dominik Beršnjak	20 April 2020
Domžale	(Slovenia) Andrej Razdrh	15 June 2020	9th	(Slovenia) Dejan Djuranović	15 June 2020
Olimpija Ljubljana	(Slovenia) Safet Hadžić	15 June 2020	1st	(Croatia) Dino Skender	19 June 2020

== League table ==
Pos	Team	Pld	W	D	L	GF	GA	GD	Pts	Qualification or relegation
1	Celje (C)	36	19	12	5	74	36	+38	69	Qualification for the Champions League first qualifying round
2	Maribor	36	20	7	9	66	39	+27	67 (Note: Head-to-head goal difference: Maribor +1, Olimpija −1)	Qualification for the Europa League first qualifying round
3	Olimpija	36	20	7	9	73	44	+29	67	Qualification for the Europa League first qualifying round
4	Mura (Note: Mura qualified for the Europa League first qualifying round by winning the 2019–20 Slovenian Football Cup.)	36	14	14	8	54	42	+12	56	Qualification for the Europa League first qualifying round
5	Aluminij	36	16	7	13	58	48	+10	55	
6	Bravo	36	13	10	13	50	53	−3	49	
7	Tabor Sežana	36	13	7	16	45	51	−6	46	
8	Domžale	36	12	7	17	52	64	−12	43	
9	Triglav Kranj (R)	36	9	5	22	44	87	−43	32	Qualification for the relegation play-offs
10	Rudar Velenje (R)	36	0	12	24	28	80	−52	12	Relegation to Slovenian Second League

Source: PrvaLiga
Rules for classification: 1) Points; 2) Head-to-head points; 3) Head-to-head goal difference; 4) Head-to-head goals scored; 5) Goal difference; 6) Goals scored
(C) Champions; (R) Relegated

== Results ==
=== First half of the season ===
Home \ Away	ALU	BRA	CEL	DOM	MAR	MUR	OLI	RUD	TAB	TRI
Aluminij		5–1	0–0	4–2	0–2	2–0	1–0	1–1	3–0	2–1
Bravo	0–1		2–2	0–0	0–1	3–3	0–2	2–1	1–0	1–0
Celje	0–0	2–2		2–1	2–1	2–2	1–3	3–0	2–0	4–0
Domžale	1–1	2–0	3–5		0–1	0–0	1–4	2–2	1–0	3–0
Maribor	2–1	4–0	1–0	4–1		0–0	0–0	5–0	4–2	1–2
Mura	2–4	4–3	1–0	3–0	1–1		3–1	2–0	1–0	2–2
Olimpija	3–1	3–1	2–2	4–2	2–4	1–1		6–0	2–0	4–2
Rudar	1–2	1–4	3–3	2–3	1–1	1–2	0–3		2–2	1–1
Tabor	0–2	3–1	1–0	2–1	4–1	1–1	1–2	1–1		2–0
Triglav	1–0	1–0	0–6	2–3	1–3	1–3	2–3	3–2	3–2	

Source: PrvaLiga
Legend: Blue = home team win; Yellow = draw; Red = away team win.

=== Second half of the season ===
Home \ Away	ALU	BRA	CEL	DOM	MAR	MUR	OLI	RUD	TAB	TRI
Aluminij		1–2	0–2	2–5	1–4	1–3	1–2	1–0	0–2	8–1
Bravo	0–0		1–2	2–1	0–3	1–0	1–2	1–1	2–1	1–0
Celje	2–0	2–2		4–1	2–0	1–0	2–2	2–0	1–1	2–2
Domžale	1–3	1–1	1–1		1–2	1–2	0–1	2–1	2–1	2–1
Maribor	3–0	1–2	1–2	2–1		3–2	1–1	3–0	0–0	0–2
Mura	1–1	1–1	3–1	0–1	1–2		1–1	1–1	3–2	2–0
Olimpija	0–1	0–5	0–1	0–1	1–0	1–0		5–0	1–2	0–2
Rudar	1–3	1–3	0–2	2–3	1–1	0–0	1–1		0–1	0–1
Tabor	1–1	0–0	0–4	2–1	4–1	1–2	0–3	1–0		3–1
Triglav	1–4	1–4	0–5	1–1	1–3	1–1	3–7	3–0	1–2	

Source: PrvaLiga
Legend: Blue = home team win; Yellow = draw; Red = away team win.

== PrvaLiga play-off ==
A two-legged play-off between the ninth-placed team from the PrvaLiga and the second-placed team from the 2019–20 Slovenian Second League was played. The winner earned a place in the 2020–21 PrvaLiga season.

26 July 2020
18:00 CEST

Gorica	1–1	Triglav Kranj
Osuji 27'	Report	Arh Česen 30'

Nova Gorica Sports Park, Nova Gorica
Referee: Bojan Mertik
30 July 2020
17:00 CEST

Triglav Kranj	0–5	Gorica
	Report	Begić 25'; Osuji 29'; Marinič 56'; Grudina 61'; Kolenc 68'

Stanko Mlakar Stadium, Kranj
Referee: Rade Obrenović

Gorica won 6–1 on aggregate.

== Season statistics ==
=== Top goalscorers ===
Rank	Player	Club	Goals
1	(Croatia) Ante Vukušić	Olimpija Ljubljana	26
2	(Croatia) Dario Vizinger	Celje	23
3	(Slovenia) Mitja Lotrič	Celje	18
4	(Slovenia) Aljoša Matko	Bravo	15
4	(Croatia) Ante Živković	Aluminij	15
6	(Serbia) Predrag Sikimić	Tabor Sežana/Domžale	14
6	(Slovenia) Rok Kronaveter	Maribor	14
8	(Slovenia) Amadej Maroša	Mura	13
9	(Croatia) Luka Bobičanec	Mura	12
10	(Austria) Arnel Jakupović	Domžale	11

Source: PrvaLiga official website

== Awards ==
=== Annual awards ===
PrvaLiga Player of the Season

- Mitja Lotrič

PrvaLiga U23 Player of the Season

- Dario Vizinger

PrvaLiga Coach of the Season

- Dušan Kosič

=== PrvaLiga Team of the Season ===

Slovenian PrvaLiga Team of the 2019–20 season – SPINS XI.

Player	Team	Position	Ref.
(Slovenia) Matjaž Rozman	Celje	Goalkeeper	
(Slovenia) Matic Maruško	Mura	Defender	
(Serbia) Nemanja Jakšić	Aluminij	Defender	
(Slovenia) Miral Samardžić	Olimpija Ljubljana	Defender	
(Slovenia) Žan Zaletel	Celje	Defender	
(Bosnia and Herzegovina) Luka Menalo	Olimpija Ljubljana	Midfielder	
(Croatia) Luka Bobičanec	Mura	Midfielder	
(Bosnia and Herzegovina) Tomislav Tomić	Olimpija Ljubljana	Midfielder	
(Slovenia) Mitja Lotrič	Celje	Forward	
(Croatia) Ante Vukušić	Olimpija Ljubljana	Forward	
(Croatia) Dario Vizinger	Celje	Forward	

== See also ==
- 2019–20 Slovenian Football Cup
- 2019–20 Slovenian Second League

== Notes ==
^a All matches after March 2020 were played either behind closed doors or with significantly reduced capacity due to the COVID-19 pandemic in Slovenia.
