= AHEC =

AHEC may refer to:

- Tilen Ahec, a Slovenian soccer player who played for 2016–17 NK Aluminij season
- Area Health Education Center, a center in the U.S. federal government program Area Health Education Centers Program
- Army Heritage and Education Center, Carlisle Barracks, Pennsylvania
- Auraria Higher Education Center, Denver, Colorado, US; a learning center on the Auraria Campus
- Australian Health Ethics Committee, a medical ethics ethics committee

== See also ==
- HEC (disambiguation)
