= Barukčić =

Barukčić, rendered Barukčič in Slovenian, is a Croat surname. People with the name include:

- Andrija Barukčić (1805–1834), Croatian poet from Bosnia and Herzegovina
- Igor Barukčič (born 1990), Slovenian footballer
- Igor Barukčić (born 1982), Croatian footballer
