= HEC =

HEC or Hec may refer to:

== Businesses and organizations ==
- Hautes Études Commerciales (disambiguation), French-language business schools
- Higher Education Commission (disambiguation)
- Hongkong Electric Company
- Hotel Ezra Cornell, a student-run hospitality leadership conference
- Hydro Tasmania (formerly Hydro-Electric Commission)
- Hyundai Engineering (HEC), a Korean firm founded in 1974

== Science, technology and mathematics ==
=== Computing and communications ===
- Hollerith Electronic Computer, Britain's first mass-produced business computer
- Header Error Control, a method used in some telecommunication protocols
- HDMI Ethernet Channel, an audiovisual technology

=== Medicine ===
- HEC syndrome, a condition
- Human equivalent concentration
- Hyperinsulinemic euglycemic clamp, a test of insulin resistance

=== Other uses in science and mathematics ===
- Habitable Exoplanets Catalog, in astronomy
- Hyperelliptic curve, in algebraic geometry
- Hydroxyethyl cellulose, a thickening agent
- HEC meeting, the Heart of Europe Bio-Crystallography Meeting

== Other uses ==
- The title character of Hec Ramsey, a television Western (1972–1974)
- Heckington railway station, England; National Rail station code HEC

== People ==
=== Sportspeople ===
- Hec Crighton (fl. 1952–1986), Canadian gridiron football coach
- Hec Cyre (1901–1971), Canadian gridiron football player
- Hec Davidson (1908–1976), Australian-rules footballer
- Hector Dyer (1910-1990), American sprinter
- Hec Edmundson (1886–1964), American basketball coach
- Hec Fowler (1892–1987), Canadian ice hockey player
- Art Garvey (1900-1973), American gridiron football player
- Hec Gervais (1934–1997), Canadian curler
- Hec Highton (1923–1985), Canadian National Hockey League (NHL) ice hockey player
- Hector Hogan (1931-1960), Australian sprinter
- Hec Kilrea (1907–1969), Canadian NHL ice hockey player
- Hec Lalande (1934–2010), Canadian NHL ice hockey player
- Hector Lépine (1897-1951), Canadian NHL ice hockey player
- Hec McKay (fl. 1904–1935), Australian-rules footballer
- Hec Oakley (1909–1998), Australian cricketer
- Hector Pothier (born 1954), Canadian gridiron footballer
- Hec Yeomans (1895-1968), Australian-rules footballer

=== Other people ===
- Hec Clouthier (born 1949), Canadian politician
- Hector Waller (1900-1942), Australian naval officer
