= Žigon (surname) =

Žigon is a surname. Notable people with the surname include:

- Dejan Žigon (born 1989), Slovenian footballer
- Helena Žigon (1928–2020), Slovenian long-distance runner
- Jelena Žigon (1933–2018), Serbian and Yugoslav actress
- Stevo Žigon (1926–2005), Slovenian-Serbian actor, theatre director, and writer
