= Vedran Vinko =

Slovenian footballer

Personal information
- Date of birth: 22 February 1990 (age 36)
- Place of birth: Petišovci, SFR Yugoslavia
- Height: 1.68 m (5 ft 6 in)
- Position: Winger

Youth career
- –2009: Nafta Lendava

Senior career*
Years	Team	Apps	(Gls)
2006–2011	Nafta Lendava	60	(11)
2009–2010	→ Čarda (loan)	25	(15)
2011–2012	Metz II	16	(2)
2013	Mura 05	15	(3)
2013–2014	USV Allerheiligen	27	(18)
2014–2015	Austria Klagenfurt	21	(3)
2015–2016	USV Allerheiligen	26	(6)
2016–2022	Nafta 1903	150	(78)
2023	USV St. Anna/Aigen	9	(0)

International career
2006–2007	Slovenia U17	7	(0)
2007–2008	Slovenia U18	6	(1)
2010–2011	Slovenia U21	4	(0)
- * Club domestic league appearances and goals

Vedran Vinko (born 22 February 1990) is a Slovenian footballer who plays as a winger.

== Club career ==
Vinko started his career playing in the youth teams of Nafta Lendava. When he played his debut game for Nafta against Drava Ptuj, he was only 16 years old.

He has definitely established himself on the first team in the 2010–11 season, scoring 10 goals in 26 games and being appointed captain of Nafta Lendava, although the team got relegated from the Slovenian PrvaLiga after finishing in ninth place.

On 17 August 2011, Vinko signed a one-year contract with French Ligue 2 side Metz on a free transfer. FIFA later confirmed that Nafta is eligible to receive training compensation, however an appeal annulled such claim.

== Career statistics ==
Season	Club	Country	Level	Apps	Goals
2006–07	Nafta Lendava	Slovenia	I	4	1
2007–08	Nafta Lendava	Slovenia	I	3	0
2008–09	Nafta Lendava	Slovenia	I	15	0
2009–10	Nafta Lendava	Slovenia	I	7	0
2010–11	Nafta Lendava	Slovenia	I	26	10
2011–12	Nafta Lendava	Slovenia	I	5	0
2011–12	Metz	France	II	0	0
2012–13	Mura 05	Slovenia	I	15	3

== Honours ==
Nafta 1903

- Slovenian Cup runner-up: 2019–20
- Slovenian Third League: 2016–17
