= Luka Kerin =

Slovenian footballer (born 1999)

Personal information
- Date of birth: 23 March 1999 (age 27)
- Place of birth: Brežice, Slovenia
- Height: 1.79 m (5 ft 10 in)
- Positions: Winger; forward

Youth career
- 2007–2015: Krško
- 2015–2018: Internazionale
- 2017: → Krško (loan)

Senior career*
Years	Team	Apps	(Gls)
2017	→ Krško (loan)	2	(0)
2018–2022	Celje	89	(11)
2022–2024	Bravo	37	(2)
2024	Jadran Dekani	9	(2)
2025	Mura	3	(0)
2025–2026	Rudar Velenje	11	(0)

International career
2014	Slovenia U16	4	(1)
2015–2016	Slovenia U17	17	(6)
2017	Slovenia U18	2	(0)
2017	Slovenia U19	4	(0)
- * Club domestic league appearances and goals as of 29 January 2026

Luka Kerin (born 23 March 1999) is a Slovenian footballer who plays as a winger.

== Honours ==
Celje

- Slovenian PrvaLiga: 2019–20
