= Jon Šporn =

Slovenian footballer (born 1997)

Personal information
- Date of birth: 22 May 1997 (age 29)
- Place of birth: Celje, Slovenia
- Height: 1.78 m (5 ft 10 in)
- Position: Central midfielder

Youth career
- –2016: Celje

Senior career*
Years	Team	Apps	(Gls)
2014–2018	Celje	21	(1)
2017	→ Drava Ptuj (loan)	7	(2)
2017–2018	→ Drava Ptuj (loan)	15	(1)
2018–2019	Drava Ptuj	29	(5)
2019–2020	Mura	29	(1)
2020	SV Horn	3	(0)
2020–2023	Celje	56	(3)
2023–2025	Chornomorets Odesa	38	(1)

International career
2015	Slovenia U19	3	(0)
- * Club domestic league appearances and goals as of 1 August 2025

Jon Šporn (born 22 May 1997) is a Slovenian professional footballer who plays as a central midfielder.

== Club career ==
Šporn moved to Chornomorets Odesa from Celje in 2023, joining up with fellow countryman Luka Guček. He made his league debut against LNZ Cherkasy, where he also scored in the 65th minute in an eventual 2–0 win. Šporn left Chornomorets after the 2024–25 season.

== Honours ==
Mura

- Slovenian Cup: 2019–20
