= Podlogar =

Podlogar is a surname. Notable people with the surname include:

- Matej Podlogar (born 1991), Slovenian footballer
