= Tilen Nagode =

Slovenian footballer

Personal information
- Full name: Tilen Nagode
- Date of birth: 21 March 1996 (age 30)
- Place of birth: Slovenia
- Position: Forward

Youth career
- –2010: Primorje
- 2012–2015: Gorica

Senior career*
Years	Team	Apps	(Gls)
2014–2018	Gorica	67	(1)
2018–2019	Bilje	27	(2)
2019–2021	Primorje	42	(11)

International career
2017	Slovenia U21	5	(1)
- * Club domestic league appearances and goals as of 23:54, 7 November 2019 (UTC)

Tilen Nagode (born 21 March 1996) is a Slovenian footballer who most recently played for ND Primorje.

== Career ==
On 8 July 2019, ND Primorje confirmed that Nagode has joined the club from ND Bilje.
