= Heart of Europe Bio-Crystallography Meeting =

The Heart of Europe Bio-Crystallography Meeting (short HEC-Meeting) is an annual academic conference on structural biology, in particular protein crystallography. Researchers from universities, other research institutions and industry from Austria, Czech Republic, Germany and Poland meet to present and discuss current topics of their research. The talks are predominantly given by PhD students (doctoral students). An exception is the invited HEC lecture, which is held by a renowned scientist of the research field. The format of the HEC meeting has been adopted from the eleven years older Rhine-Knee Regional Meeting on Structural Biology.

== History of the HEC-Meeting ==
The HEC-Meeting dates back to an initiative in the year 1998 of Manfred Weiss and Rolf Hilgenfeld, who were researchers at the Institute for Molecular Biotechnology (IMB) in Jena and intended to establish a meeting format similar to the Rhine-Knee Regional Meeting on Structural Biology in the New Länder. Both conferences are regional meetings of German scientists together with scientific research groups of the neighbouring countries. Nine groups from Germany (the new states and West-Berlin), Poland and Czech Republic participated in the first HEC-Meeting from 8 to 10 October 1998. Later also groups from Austria and the Old Federal States participated. Due to the Covid-19 pandemic, no meeting was organized in 2020 and HEC-23 took place as an online meeting.

Former HEC-Meetings:

Meeting	year	location	organiser	participants	HEC-lecture	Weblink
HEC-1	1998	Eisenberg, Germany	R. Hilgenfeld, M. Weiss, IMB Jena	41	-	
HEC-2	1999	Lübben, Germany	U. Heinemann, Y. Muller, MDC Berlin	53	V. Lamzin	
HEC-3	2000	Poznań, Poland	M. Jaskolski, CBB Poznan	53	G. Sheldrick	Webpage,
HEC-4	2001	Bedřichov, Czech Republic	J. Sedlacek, IMG Prague	48	Z. Otwinowski	
HEC-5	2002	Goslar, Germany	D. Heinz, GBF Brunswick	68	A. Yonath	
HEC-6	2003	Wittenberg, Germany	S. König, M. Stubbs, MLU Halle	113	T. Bergfors	
HEC-7	2004	Krzyżowa, Poland	M. Bochtler, IIMCB Warsaw	101	A. Wlodawer	
HEC-8	2005	Karlovy Vary, Czech Republic	J. Sedlacek, IMG Prague	101	Z. Dauter	
HEC-9	2006	Teistungenburg, Germany	R. Ficner, Univ. Göttingen	128	E. Garman	Webpage
HEC-10	2007	Będlewo, Poland	M. Jaskolski, CBB Poznan	116	G. Dodson	Webpage
HEC-11	2008	Greifswald, Germany	W. Hinrichs, Univ. Greifswald	102	P. Nissen	
HEC-12	2009	Třešť, Czech Republic	P. Rezacova, IMG Prag	107	P. Emsley	Webpage,
HEC-13	2010	Schöneck/Vogtl., Germany	N. Sträter, Leipzig University	107	A. Popov	Webpage,
HEC-14	2011	Żagań, Poland	M. Jaskolski, CBB/PTPS Poznan	101	Z. Derewenda	Webpage
HEC-15	2012	Beilngries, Germany	Y. Muller, Univ. Erlangen	93	B. Rupp	Webpage
HEC-16	2013	St Georgen im Attergau, Austria	K. Djinovic-Carugo, Univ. Vienna	114	P. Tompa	Webpage,
HEC-17	2014	Akademie Berlin-Schmöckwitz, Germany	M. Weiss, U. Müller, HZB Berlin	134	G. Klebe	Webpage,
HEC-18	2015	Kutná Hora, Czech Republic	J. Dohnálek, IBT Prague	120	R. Read	Webpage
HEC-19	2016	Warberg, Germany	W. Blankenfeldt, A. Scrima, HZI Brunswick	119	I. Schlichting	Webpage
HEC-20	2017	Wojanów Palace, Poland	M. Bochtler, M. Nowotny, IIMCB Warsaw	112	T. Clausen	Webpage
HEC-21	2018	Quedlinburg, Germany	M. Stubbs, MLU Halle	126	M. Rossmann	Webpage
HEC-22	2019	Obergurgl, Austria	K. Scheffzek, Med. Univ. Innsbruck	122	V. Ramakrishnan	Webpage,
HEC-23	2021	online conference	C. Steegborn, Univ. Bayreuth	122	H. Nar	Webpage
HEC-24	2022	Dolní Vltavice, Czech Republic	I. K. Smatanová, Univ. South Bohemia	108	K. Diederichs	Webpage
HEC-25	2023	Salem, Malchin, Germany	M. Lammers, Univ. Greifswald	113	F. Wittinghofer	Webpage
HEC-26	2024	Kraków, Poland	S. Glatt & P.Grudnik, Jagiellonian University	118	A. Pearson	Webpage
HEC-27	2025	Halberstadt, Germany	M. Wahl, Free University of Berlin	112	T. Beck	Webpage
HEC-28	2026	Blansko, Czech Republic	C. Bařinka, Czech Academy of Sciences	109	Y. Jones	Webpage
