= Hautes Études Commerciales =

Hautes Études Commerciales (HEC) may refer to one of several business schools, including the following.

== Europe ==
- HEC Paris, France
- HECJF, France
- HEC Lausanne, Switzerland
- HEC Geneva, Switzerland
- HEC Management School – University of Liège, Belgium
- ICHEC Brussels Management School, Belgium
- EDHEC Business School, France, England and Singapore

== Elsewhere ==
- HEC Alger, Algeria
- HEC Yaoundé, Cameroun
- HEC Montréal, Canada
- HEC Maroc, Morocco
- IHEC Carthage, Tunisia
