= Andrej Razdrh =

Slovenian footballer and manager (born 1976)

Personal information
- Date of birth: 28 October 1976 (age 49)
- Place of birth: Ljubljana, SFR Yugoslavia
- Position: Midfielder

Team information
- Current team: Slovenia U21 (manager)

Senior career*
Years	Team	Apps	(Gls)
1992–1995	Svoboda	2	(0)
1997–1998	Primorje	3	(0)
1998–1999	Triglav Kranj	25	(1)
1999–2000	Domžale	5	(0)

International career
1997	Slovenia U20	2	(0)

Managerial career
- 2012–2013: Olimpija Ljubljana
- 2018–2019: Tabor Sežana
- 2019–2020: Domžale
- 2022: Ethnikos Achna
- 2025–: Slovenia U21
- * Club domestic league appearances and goals

Andrej Razdrh (born 28 October 1976) is a Slovenian professional football manager and former player who is the manager of Slovenia under-21 national team.
