= Almir Sulejmanović =

Slovenian footballer and manager

Personal information
- Date of birth: 26 January 1978 (age 48)
- Place of birth: Velenje, SFR Yugoslavia
- Height: 1.78 m (5 ft 10 in)
- Position: Right-back

Team information
- Current team: Dravinja (head coach)

Youth career
- Rudar Velenje

Senior career*
Years	Team	Apps	(Gls)
1996–2001	Rudar Velenje	111	(6)
2001–2002	Celje	48	(2)
2003	Genk	8	(0)
2003–2004	Mura	9	(1)
2004–2005	Celje	36	(1)
2006	Atlantas	16	(0)
2006–2007	Zorya Luhansk	2	(0)
2007	Vėtra	5	(0)
2007–2010	Rudar Velenje	74	(4)
2010–2011	Elbasani	29	(0)
2011	Skenderbeu	3	(0)
2012	Krka		
2012–2013	Aluminij	12	(0)
2013	SV Sulmtal-Koralm	12	(1)
2013–2014	Dravograd		
2015	Korotan Prevalje	1	(0)

International career
1998	Slovenia U20	4	(0)
1999	Slovenia U21	2	(0)

Managerial career
- 2013–2014: Dravograd
- 2014–2015: Korotan Prevalje
- 2019: Rudar Velenje
- 2019–2020: Tabor Sežana
- 2020–2021: Rudar Velenje
- 2023–: Dravinja
- * Club domestic league appearances and goals

Almir Sulejmanović (born 26 January 1978) is a Slovenian football manager and former player who is the head coach of Dravinja.
