= Irfan Hadžić =

Bosnian footballer (born 1993)

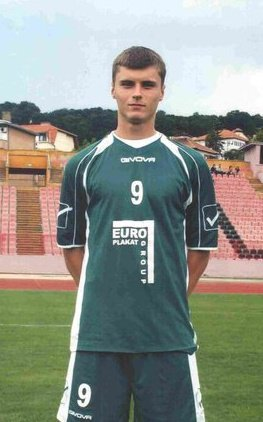
- Hadžić with the youth team of Olimpik in 2010

Personal information
- Full name: Irfan Hadžić
- Date of birth: 15 June 1993 (age 33)
- Place of birth: Prozor-Rama, Bosnia and Herzegovina
- Height: 1.92 m (6 ft 4 in)
- Position: Forward

Team information
- Current team: Smederevo 1924
- Number: 9

Youth career
- 2010–2011: Olimpik Sarajevo
- 2012–2013: Jong Vitesse/AGOVV

Senior career*
Years	Team	Apps	(Gls)
2011–2012	Zulte Waregem	0	(0)
2013	Inter Zaprešić	3	(0)
2014	ViOn Zlaté Moravce	3	(1)
2015–2016	Royal Antwerp	0	(0)
2015–2016	→ Vigor Wuitens Hamme (loan)	32	(16)
2016–2017	Celje	16	(4)
2017–2019	Radnik Bijeljina	54	(15)
2019	Zrinjski Mostar	2	(0)
2019–2020	Akhisarspor	30	(8)
2021	Lokomotiva Zagreb	11	(1)
2022	Zrinjski Mostar	9	(0)
2023–2024	Tuzla City	42	(12)
2024	Gangwon FC	3	(0)
2025	Tekstilac Odžaci	9	(4)
2025–2026	Mladost Lučani	30	(4)
2026–	Smederevo 1924	0	(0)

International career
2011–2012	Bosnia and Herzegovina U19	5	(0)
2020	Bosnia and Herzegovina	2	(0)
- * Club domestic league appearances and goals as of 13 June 2026

Irfan Hadžić (born 15 June 1993) is a Bosnian professional footballer who plays as a forward for Serbian club Smederevo 1924.

== Club career ==
=== Early career ===
Hadžić started off his football career at the youth team of Olimpik in 2010 and stayed at the club until 2011. After leaving Olimpik, he mostly played abroad at Zulte Waregem, with whom he signed his first professional contract, the youth team of Vitesse Arnhem, Inter Zaprešić, ViOn Zlaté Moravce, Royal Antwerp, who loaned him out to Vigor Wuitens Hamme, and Celje, before returning to Bosnia and Herzegovina.

=== Radnik Bijeljina ===
After six years of playing abroad, Hadžić returned to his home country and on 19 July 2017 signed a contract with Bosnian Premier League club Radnik Bijeljina. He made his official debut for Radnik in a 2–0 home league loss against Željezničar Sarajevo on 10 September 2017, coming in as a 66th-minute substitute for Velibor Đurić.

He scored his first goal for the club against Sloboda Tuzla on 28 October 2017 in the 48th minute, which would turn out to be the only and the winning goal of the match.

In his second season with the club, Hadžić was Radnik's best scorer, scoring 10 goals in 32 league games in the 2018–19 season.

=== Zrinjski Mostar ===
After his contract with Radnik expired, Hadžić signed a contract with Zrinjski Mostar on 7 June 2019. He made his official debut and scored his first goal for Zrinjski on 11 July 2019, in a 3–0 away win against Akademija Pandev in the 2019–20 UEFA Europa League first qualifying round.

Hadžić made his first of only two league appearances for Zrinjski on 21 July 2019, in a 1–0 away loss against Sarajevo.

=== Akhisarspor ===
On 16 August 2019, only two months after joining Zrinjski, Hadžić left the club and signed a three-year contract with Turkish club Akhisar Belediyespor for a transfer fee of €150,000. He played his first game for Akhisarspor on 18 August 2019, a 1–0 home league win against Adanaspor, coming in as a substitute for Bertuğ Bayar in the 66th minute. Hadžić scored his first goal for Akhisarspor in a 2–1 away league loss against Osmanlıspor on 28 October 2019. He left the club on 2 January 2021.

== International career ==
Hadžić was a member of the Bosnia and Herzegovina U19 national team from 2011 to 2012, making five appearances in the process.

On 19 August 2019, he received his first senior call-up, for UEFA Euro 2020 qualifiers against Liechtenstein and Armenia.

Hadžić made his senior international debut in a friendly game against Iran on 12 November 2020.

== Career statistics ==
=== Club ===
As of match played 2 January 2021

Appearances and goals by club, season and competition
Club	Season	League			Cup		Continental		Total	
Club	Season	Division	Apps	Goals	Apps	Goals	Apps	Goals	Apps	Goals
Zulte Waregem	2011–12	Belgian First Division A	0	0	0	0	—		0	0
Inter Zaprešić	2012–13	1. HNL	3	0	—		—		3	0
Zlaté Moravce	2013–14	Slovak Super Liga	3	1	0	0	—		3	1
Royal Antwerp	2015–16	Belgian First Division B	0	0	0	0	—		0	0
Hamme (loan)	2015–16	Belgian Third Division	32	16	—		—		32	16
Celje	2016–17	Slovenian PrvaLiga	16	4	1	0	—		17	4
Radnik Bijeljina	2017–18	Bosnian Premier League	22	5	1	0	—		23	5
Radnik Bijeljina	2018–19	Bosnian Premier League	32	10	2	1	—		34	11
Radnik Bijeljina	Total		54	15	3	1	—		57	16
Zrinjski Mostar	2019–20	Bosnian Premier League	2	0	—		4 (Note: Appearances in UEFA Europa League)	2	6	2
Akhisarspor	2019–20	TFF 1. Lig	16	3	1	0	—		17	3
Akhisarspor	2020–21	TFF 1. Lig	14	5	1	0	—		15	5
Akhisarspor	Total		30	8	2	0	—		32	8
Career total			140	44	6	1	4	2	150	47

=== International ===
As of match played 18 November 2020

National team	Year	Apps	Goals
Bosnia and Herzegovina
Bosnia and Herzegovina	2020	2	0
Total		2	0
