= Stjepan Oštrek =

Croatian professional footballer

Personal information
- Date of birth: 9 August 1996 (age 30)
- Place of birth: Varaždin, Croatia
- Height: 1.81 m (5 ft 11 in)
- Position: Attacking midfielder

Team information
- Current team: Nafta 1903
- Number: 10

Youth career
- 2014–2015: Catania
- 2015: Koprivnica
- 2015–2016: Slaven Belupo
- 2016–2017: Varaždin

Senior career*
| Years | Team | Apps | (Gls) |
| 2017– | Nafta 1903 | 106 | (29) |
| 2020 | → Zalaegerszeg (loan) | 7 | (0) |
| 2021–2022 | → Koper (loan) | 14 | (1) |

International career
| 2010 | Croatia U15 | 2 | (1) |
| 2012 | Croatia U16 | 13 | (1) |
| 2012 | Croatia U17 | 3 | (0) |
| 2013 | Croatia U19 | 1 | (0) |
- * Club domestic league appearances and goals as of 5 November 2022

Stjepan Oštrek (born 9 August 1996) is a Croatian professional footballer who plays for Nafta 1903.

== Career statistics ==
As of 27 June 2020

Appearances and goals by club, season and competition
| Club | Season | League | | | National cup | | Continental | | Other | | Total | |
| Club | Season | Division | Apps | Goals | Apps | Goals | Apps | Goals | Apps | Goals | Apps | Goals |
|---|---|---|---|---|---|---|---|---|---|---|---|---|
| Nafta 1903 | 2017–18 | Slovenian Second League | 28 | 5 | 1 | 0 | — | | — | | 29 | 5 |
| Nafta 1903 | 2018–19 | Slovenian Second League | 25 | 4 | 2 | 0 | — | | — | | 27 | 4 |
| Nafta 1903 | 2019–20 | Slovenian Second League | 19 | 5 | 4 | 3 | — | | — | | 23 | 8 |
| Nafta 1903 | Total | | 72 | 14 | 7 | 3 | 0 | 0 | 0 | 0 | 79 | 17 |
| Zalaegerszeg (loan) | 2019–20 | Nemzeti Bajnokság I | 7 | 0 | 4 | 3 | — | | — | | 11 | 3 |
| Career total | | | 79 | 14 | 11 | 6 | 0 | 0 | 0 | 0 | 90 | 20 |
