= Žiga Škoflek =

Slovenian footballer (born 1994)

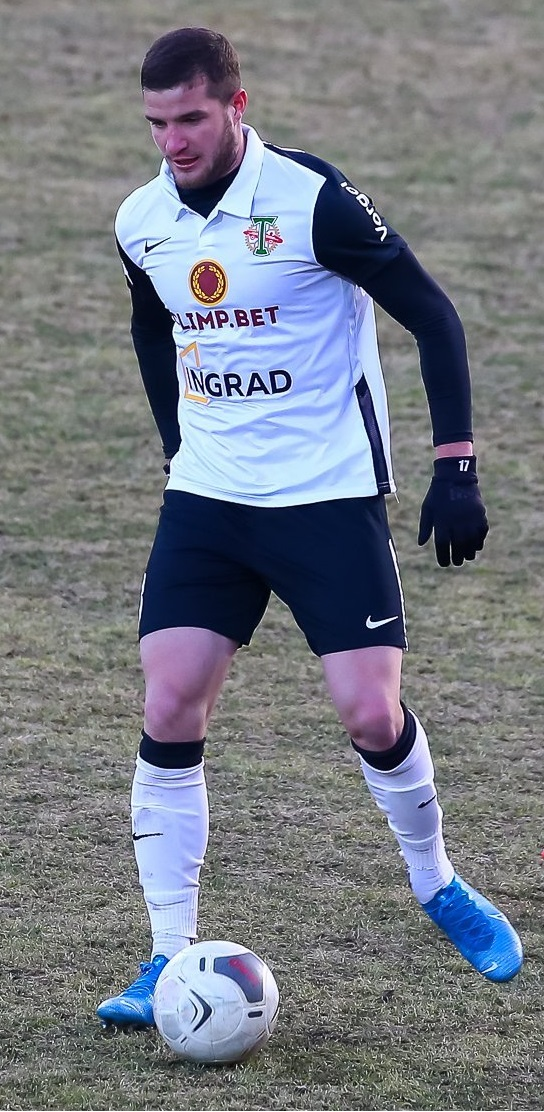
- Škoflek with Torpedo Moscow in 2021

Personal information
- Date of birth: 22 July 1994 (age 32)
- Place of birth: Vojnik, Slovenia
- Height: 1.83 m (6 ft 0 in)
- Position: Midfielder

Team information
- Current team: USVS Rudersdorf
- Number: 11

Youth career
- –2013: Šampion

Senior career*
Years	Team	Apps	(Gls)
2012–2014	Šampion	48	(14)
2014–2018	Aluminij	99	(29)
2018	Stal Mielec	6	(0)
2018–2019	Rudar Velenje	30	(14)
2019–2021	Orenburg	27	(6)
2021	Torpedo Moscow	10	(0)
2021–2022	Mura	13	(1)
2022–2023	Ilirija 1911	19	(1)
2023–2025	TuS Heiligenkreuz	53	(23)
2025–	USVS Rudersdorf	0	(0)
- * Club domestic league appearances and goals as of 15 July 2025

Žiga Škoflek (born 22 July 1994) is a Slovenian footballer who plays as a midfielder for Austrian club USVS Rudersdorf.

== Club career ==
On 23 August 2019, Škoflek signed with Russian club Orenburg. He made his debut in the Russian Premier League for Orenburg on 25 August 2019 in a game against Arsenal Tula, as a starter.
