= Josip Zeba =

Croatian professional footballer (born 1990)

Personal information
- Date of birth: 24 April 1990 (age 36)
- Place of birth: Kotor Varoš, SFR Yugoslavia
- Height: 1.88 m (6 ft 2 in)
- Position: Centre back

Team information
- Current team: Grindavík
- Number: 30

Senior career*
Years	Team	Apps	(Gls)
–2011	Suhopolje		
2011	HAŠK		
2011–2012	Međimurje	27	(0)
2012–2014	Segesta Sisak	31	(3)
2014–2015	Sesvete	29	(1)
2015–2016	Segesta Sisak	30	(2)
2016–2017	Aluminij	30	(5)
2017	Concordia Chiajna	4	(0)
2018	Aluminij	18	(1)
2018	Hoàng Anh Gia Lai	9	(2)
2019–	Grindavík	71	(8)
- * Club domestic league appearances and goals as of 19 August 2022

Josip Zeba (born 24 April 1990) is a Croatian professional footballer who plays as a defender for Grindavík in Iceland.
