= Marko Kovjenić =

Slovenian footballer

Personal information
- Full name: Marko Kovjenić
- Date of birth: 2 February 1993 (age 33)
- Place of birth: Ljubljana, Slovenia
- Height: 1.85 m (6 ft 1 in)
- Position: Midfielder

Team information
- Current team: SV Pichl 1963
- Number: 18

Youth career
- –2012: Domžale

Senior career*
Years	Team	Apps	(Gls)
2011–2014	Domžale	28	(1)
2015	ViOn Zlaté Moravce	5	(0)
2016–2017	Radomlje	46	(4)
2018	Zarica Kranj	9	(0)
2019	FC Wels	7	(0)
2019	SV Grün-Weiß Micheldorf	12	(1)
2020	Blaue Elf Wels	12	(3)
2021-2022	St. Peter/Au	23	(1)
2022-2023	Schwanenstadt 08	24	(4)
2023-	SV Pichl 1963	9	(2)

International career
2010	Slovenia U18	4	(0)
2011–2012	Slovenia U19	18	(3)
2011–2012	Slovenia U20	5	(0)
2013	Slovenia U21	2	(0)
- * Club domestic league appearances and goals as of 8 December 2023

Marko Kovjenić (born 2 February 1993) is a Slovenian football midfielder who plays for Austrian lower league side SV Pichl 1963.
