= Rifet Kapić =

Bosnian footballer

Personal information
- Date of birth: 3 July 1995 (age 31)
- Place of birth: Cazin, Bosnia and Herzegovina
- Height: 1.80 m (5 ft 11 in)
- Position: Midfielder

Team information
- Current team: Lechia Gdańsk
- Number: 10

Youth career
- –2013: Krajina Cazin
- 2013–2014: Sarajevo
- 2014–2015: Istra 1961
- 2015: Varnsdorf

Senior career*
Years	Team	Apps	(Gls)
2015	Varnsdorf	2	(0)
2016–2018	Gorica	62	(14)
2018–2019	Grasshoppers	9	(0)
2018	→ Sheriff Tiraspol (loan)	14	(4)
2019	→ Sarajevo (loan)	12	(0)
2019–2021	SC Paderborn	0	(0)
2020–2021	→ Sheriff Tiraspol (loan)	23	(3)
2021–2022	Sarajevo	25	(1)
2022–2023	Kryvbas Kryvyi Rih	23	(6)
2023–2024	Valmiera	0	(0)
2023–2024	→ Lechia Gdańsk (loan)	32	(3)
2024–	Lechia Gdańsk	64	(9)
- * Club domestic league appearances and goals as of 08:33, 26 May 2026 (UTC)

Rifet Kapić (Bosnian pronunciation: [rǐfet kǎpitɕ]; born 3 July 1995) is a Bosnian professional footballer who plays as a midfielder for and captains Polish I liga club Lechia Gdańsk.

He started his professional career at Varnsdorf, before joining Gorica in 2016. Two years later, Kapić moved to Grasshoppers, who loaned him to Sheriff Tiraspol in 2018 and to Sarajevo in 2019. Later that year, he signed with SC Paderborn, who also loaned him to Sheriff. In 2021, Kapić returned to Sarajevo.

== Club career ==
=== Early career ===
Kapić started playing football with his hometown club Krajina Cazin. He then spent brief period of time in the academy of Sarajevo, after which he played for Istra 1961's youth team.

Kapić made his professional debut playing for Czech club Varnsdorf in 2015.

In February 2016, Kapić signed a three-year contract with Gorica. On 29 April, he scored his first professional goal against Zavrč.

=== Grasshoppers ===
On 12 January 2018, Kapić moved to Swiss side Grasshopper Club Zürich on a four-year deal for an undisclosed transfer fee. He made his competitive debut for the club in a 3–1 win over Sion on 4 February.

In June 2018, he was sent on a season-long loan to Moldovan outfit Sheriff Tiraspol.

In February 2019, he was loaned to Bosnian club Sarajevo until the end of season.

=== SC Paderborn ===
On 1 June 2019, Kapić signed a three-year contract with Bundesliga club SC Paderborn.

In August 2020, he joined Sheriff Tiraspol on loan for a second time with them, also securing an option to sign him permanently.

In June 2021, Kapić terminated his contract with the club.

=== Return to Sarajevo ===
On 2 September 2021, Kapić returned to Sarajevo, signing a two-year contract. He made his second debut for Sarajevo on 10 September, in a league game against Velež Mostar. On 17 October 2021, Kapić scored the only goal in Sarajevo's 1–0 league victory at home to Posušje.

=== Lechia Gdańsk ===
On 21 July 2023, he joined Polish I liga side Lechia Gdańsk on loan for twelve months.

== Career statistics ==
As of match played 23 May 2026

Appearances and goals by club, season and competition
Club	Season	League			National cup (Note: Includes Slovenian Cup, Swiss Cup, Cupa Moldovei, Bosnia and Herzegovina Cup, Latvian Cup, Polish Cup)		Continental		Total	
Club	Season	Division	Apps	Goals	Apps	Goals	Apps	Goals	Apps	Goals
Varnsdorf	2014–15	Czech National League	2	0	—		—		2	0
Gorica	2015–16	Slovenian PrvaLiga	12	1	—		—		12	1
Gorica	2016–17	Slovenian PrvaLiga	33	6	3	0	2 (Note: Appearances in UEFA Europa League)	0	38	6
Gorica	2017–18	Slovenian PrvaLiga	17	7	2	0	4	4	23	11
Gorica	Total		62	14	5	0	6	4	73	18
Grasshoppers	2017–18	Swiss Super League	9	0	1	0	—		10	0
Sheriff Tiraspol (loan)	2018	Moldovan National Division	14	4	2	1	8 (Note: Four appearances in UEFA Champions League, four appearances and one goal in UEFA Europa League)	1	24	6
Sarajevo (loan)	2018–19	Bosnian Premier League	12	0	6	2	—		18	2
SC Paderborn	2019–20	Bundesliga	0	0	0	0	—		0	0
Sheriff Tiraspol (loan)	2020–21	Moldovan National Division	23	3	3	0	1	0	27	3
Sarajevo	2021–22	Bosnian Premier League	19	1	5	0	—		24	1
Sarajevo	2022–23	Bosnian Premier League	6	0	—		—		6	0
Sarajevo	Total		25	1	5	0	—		30	1
Kryvbas Kryvyi Rih	2022–23	Ukrainian Premier League	23	6	6	0	—		29	6
Valmiera	2023	Latvian Higher League	0	0	1	0	2 (Note: Appearances in UEFA Champions League)	0	3	0
Lechia Gdańsk (loan)	2023–24	I liga	32	3	1	0	—		33	3
Lechia Gdańsk	2024–25	Ekstraklasa	32	4	1	0	—		33	4
Lechia Gdańsk	2025–26	Ekstraklasa	32	5	3	0	—		35	5
Lechia Gdańsk	Total		96	12	5	0	—		101	12
Career total			266	40	34	3	17	5	317	48

== Honours ==
Sheriff Tiraspol

- Moldovan National Division: 2018, 2020–21

Sarajevo

- Bosnian Premier League: 2018–19
- Bosnian Cup: 2018–19

Lechia Gdańsk

- I liga: 2023–24

Individual

- Polish Union of Footballers' I liga Team of the Season: 2023–24
