= Anej Lovrečič =

Slovenian footballer (born 1987)

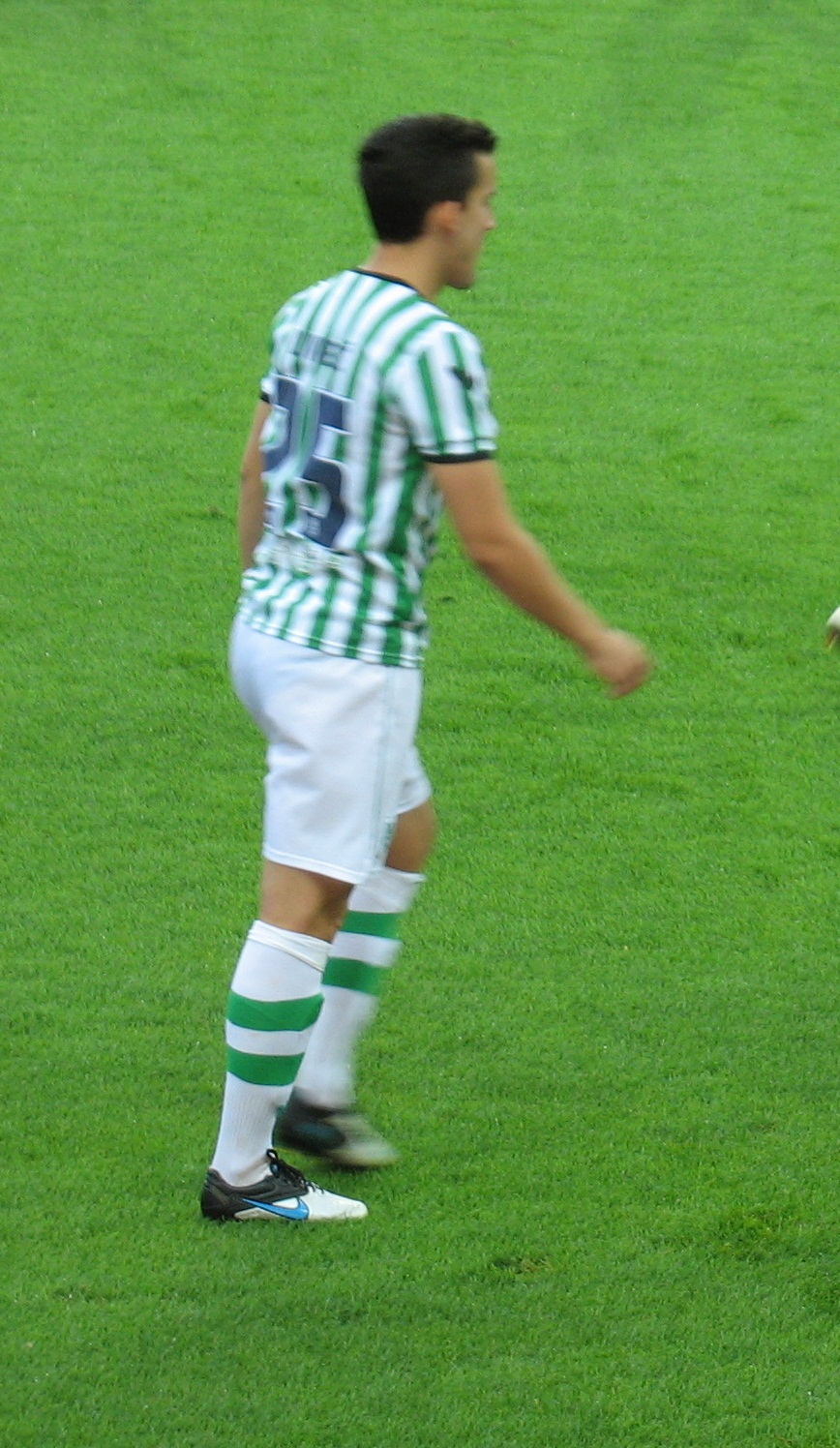
- Lovrečič during football match Olimpija Ljubljana vs. NK Domžale

Personal information
- Full name: Anej Lovrečič
- Date of birth: 10 May 1987 (age 39)
- Place of birth: Koper, SFR Yugoslavia
- Height: 1.78 m (5 ft 10 in)
- Position: Central midfielder

Youth career
- –1999: Breg
- 1999–2000: Korte
- 2000–2002: Izola
- 2002–2005: Koper

Senior career*
Years	Team	Apps	(Gls)
2005–2007	Koper	34	(2)
2006–2007	→ Jadran Dekani (loan)	7	(2)
2007–2008	Lecce	1	(0)
2008–2010	Celje	41	(11)
2010–2013	Olimpija Ljubljana	78	(16)
2013	Vaslui	12	(0)
2014	Vardar	11	(0)
2014	Celje	14	(2)
2015	Voždovac	11	(0)
2015	Ayia Napa	11	(0)
2016	Chikhura Sachkhere	4	(0)
2016–2017	Celje	10	(0)
2017–2018	FC Großklein	39	(7)
2019	UFC Bad Radkersburg-Laafeld	13	(0)
2019-2022	GASV Pölfing-Brunn	50	(10)

International career
2004	Slovenia U17	1	(0)
2007–2008	Slovenia U21	7	(1)
- * Club domestic league appearances and goals as of 14 June 2017

Anej Lovrečič (born 10 May 1987) is a Slovenian footballer who plays as a central midfielder for FC Großklein.

== Club career ==
Lovrečič started his career at hometown club Koper. He made his first team debut on 6 August 2005 as a late substitute in a league match with Nafta Lendava. He established himself as a first team player during the 2006–07 season. In 2007, he signed with Italian side Lecce for €1 million. After unsuccessful spell in Italy, he signed with Celje. Lovrečič signed for Olimpija on 8 June 2010. On 4 July 2013, he signed for Vaslui in the Romanian Liga I.

On 19 January 2015, he officialised his one-and-a-half-year contract with Serbian top-flight side FK Voždovac.

On 15 July 2016, he returned to NK Celje for his third spell at the club.

== Honours ==
=== Club ===
Koper

- Slovenian Cup: 2006, 2007
