= Igor Barukčić =

Croatian footballer

Personal information
- Full name: Igor Barukčić
- Date of birth: 5 April 1982 (age 44)
- Place of birth: Zagreb, SR Croatia, SFR Yugoslavia
- Height: 1.93 m (6 ft 4 in)
- Position: Midfielder

Youth career
- Dinamo Zagreb

Senior career*
Years	Team	Apps	(Gls)
2004–2005	Hrvatski Dragovoljac	2	(0)
2005–2006	Croatia Sesvete	12	(1)
2006	Pula	2	(0)
2006–2007	Eintracht Braunschweig	4	(0)
2007–2009	Slavonac CO	32	(3)
2009–2010	Croatia Sesvete	5	(0)
2010–2012	Gorica		
2012–	Klas Mičevac		
- * Club domestic league appearances and goals

Igor Barukčić (born 5 April 1982 in Zagreb) is a Croatian retired footballer who last played for NK Klas Mičevac.

Barukčić had a spell in the German 2. Bundesliga with Eintracht Braunschweig during the 2006–07 season.
