= Mihael Rebernik =

Croatian footballer (born 1996)

Personal information
- Date of birth: 6 August 1996 (age 30)
- Place of birth: Čakovec, Croatia
- Height: 1.85 m (6 ft 1 in)
- Positions: Right-back; right midfielder

Team information
- Current team: Nafta 1903
- Number: 37

Youth career
- 2006–2010: Međimurje
- 2011–2014: Varaždin

Senior career*
Years	Team	Apps	(Gls)
2013–2014	Varaždin	16	(3)
2014–2015	Međimurje	15	(7)
2015–2017	Rijeka	1	(0)
2015–2016	Rijeka II	41	(7)
2016–2017	→ Aluminij (loan)	23	(2)
2017–2018	Slaven Belupo	16	(1)
2018–2019	Mura	6	(0)
2019–	Nafta 1903	46	(10)
2022	→ Zalaegerszeg (loan)	4	(0)

International career
2015	Croatia U19	2	(0)
2015	Croatia U20	2	(0)
- * Club domestic league appearances and goals as of 8 August 2022

Mihael Rebernik (born 6 August 1996) is a Croatian footballer who plays for Slovenian PrvaLiga club Nafta 1903 as a right-back.

== Career ==
=== Rijeka ===
In January 2015, Rebernik signed a contract with HNK Rijeka in the 1. HNL. In his first two seasons with the club, he mainly featured for Rijeka II in the 3. HNL. On 15 May 2016, Rebernik made his official début for the first team, when he entered as a substitute in a home win against Istra 1961 in the final round of the 2015–16 Croatian First Football League.

=== Aluminij (loan) ===
On 19 July 2016, Rijeka sent Rebernik on a season-long loan to Aluminij in Slovenia.

=== Nafta 1903 and Zalaegerszegi TE ===
After two and a half seasons featuring for Nafta 1903 in Slovenia's second division, Rebernik was loaned, in January 2022, to their sister team, Zalaegerszegi TE, to play in Hungary's top tier until the end of the season.
