= Nemanja Jakšić =

Serbian footballer (born 1995)

Personal information
- Date of birth: 11 July 1995 (age 31)
- Place of birth: Priština, FR Yugoslavia
- Height: 1.77 m (5 ft 10 in)
- Position: Right-back

Team information
- Current team: Borac Banja Luka
- Number: 30

Senior career*
Years	Team	Apps	(Gls)
2013–2014	Red Star Belgrade	1	(0)
2014	→ Železnik (loan)	10	(2)
2014–2015	Zeta	41	(0)
2016	Zavrč	10	(0)
2016–2021	Aluminij	140	(6)
2021–2025	Bravo	125	(3)
2025–	Borac Banja Luka	33	(1)

International career
2011–2012	Serbia U17	8	(1)
- * Club domestic league appearances and goals as of 20 September 2026

Nemanja Jakšić (Serbian Cyrillic: Немања Јакшић; born 11 July 1995) is a Serbian professional footballer who plays as a defender for Bosnian Premier League club Borac Banja Luka.

== Club career ==
Jakšić made his professional debut for Red Star Belgrade on 26 May 2013, in a Serbian SuperLiga match versus Vojvodina.

== Career statistics ==
As of match played 20 September 2026

Appearances and goals by club, season and competition
Club	Season	League			National cup (Note: Includes Montenegrin Cup, Slovenian Cup)		Continental		Total	
Club	Season	Division	Apps	Goals	Apps	Goals	Apps	Goals	Apps	Goals
Red Star Belgrade	2012–13	Serbian SuperLiga	1	0	—		—		1	0
Železnik (loan)	2013–14	Serbian League Belgrade	10	2	—		—		10	2
Zeta	2014–15	Montenegrin First League	24	0	—		—		24	0
Zeta	2015–16	Montenegrin First League	17	0	3	0	—		20	0
Zeta	Total		41	0	3	0	—		44	0
Zavrč	2015–16	Slovenian PrvaLiga	10	0	2	0	—		12	0
Aluminij	2016–17	Slovenian PrvaLiga	30	1	3	0	—		33	1
Aluminij	2017–18	Slovenian PrvaLiga	32	0	5	0	—		37	0
Aluminij	2018–19	Slovenian PrvaLiga	17	0	1	0	—		18	0
Aluminij	2019–20	Slovenian PrvaLiga	30	2	4	1	—		34	3
Aluminij	2020–21	Slovenian PrvaLiga	31	3	1	0	—		32	3
Aluminij	Total		140	6	14	1	—		154	7
Bravo	2021–22	Slovenian PrvaLiga	29	0	4	0	—		33	0
Bravo	2022–23	Slovenian PrvaLiga	35	1	1	0	—		36	1
Bravo	2023–24	Slovenian PrvaLiga	27	2	—		—		27	2
Bravo	2024–25	Slovenian PrvaLiga	32	0	3	0	4 (Note: Appearances in UEFA Conference League)	1	39	1
Bravo	2025–26	Slovenian PrvaLiga	2	0	—		—		2	0
Bravo	Total		125	3	8	0	4	1	137	4
Borac Banja Luka	2025–26	Bosnian Premier League	28	1	0	0	—		28	1
Borac Banja Luka	2026–27	Bosnian Premier League	5	0	0	0	6 (Note: One appearance in UEFA Champions League, five appearances in UEFA Conference League)	0	11	0
Borac Banja Luka	Total		33	1	0	0	6	0	39	1
Career total			360	12	27	1	10	1	397	14

== Honours ==
Borac Banja Luka

- Bosnian Premier League: 2025–26
