= Dejan Krljanović =

Slovenian footballer

Personal information
- Date of birth: 12 July 1989 (age 37)
- Place of birth: Celje, SFR Yugoslavia
- Height: 1.83 m (6 ft 0 in)
- Position: Midfielder

Youth career
- –2008: Celje

Senior career*
Years	Team	Apps	(Gls)
2008–2012	Celje	29	(0)
2008	→ MU Šentjur (loan)	3	(0)
2008–2010	→ Kovinar Štore (loan)	36	(10)
2010–2011	→ Interblock (loan)	25	(4)
2012	Enosis Neon Paralimni	1	(0)
2013	Omonia Aradippou	5	(1)
2013–2014	Krka	10	(0)
2014	Aluminij	14	(1)
2015	Legionovia Legionowo	15	(2)
2015–2016	Aluminij	40	(4)
2017–2019	TuS St. Veit am Vogau	56	(16)
2019	SVH Waldbach	10	(5)
2020–2022	SV Tillmitsch	27	(11)
2022	SVU Gleinstätten	11	(2)
2023	TuS St. Veit am Vogau	8	(1)

International career
2007	Slovenia U18	2	(0)
- * Club domestic league appearances and goals

Dejan Krljanović (born 12 July 1989) is a retired Slovenian footballer who played as a midfielder.
