= Luka Cerar =

Slovenian footballer (born 1993)

Personal information
- Date of birth: 26 May 1993 (age 33)
- Place of birth: Slovenia
- Position: Midfielder

Team information
- Current team: SV Donau Klagenfurt
- Number: 22

Youth career
- –2011: Domžale
- 2012: Radomlje

Senior career*
Years	Team	Apps	(Gls)
2011	Domžale	0	(0)
2012–2015	Radomlje	88	(4)
2015	Krka	0	(0)
2016–2024	Radomlje	206	(39)
2024–	SV Donau Klagenfurt	3	(0)

International career
2011	Slovenia U19	1	(0)
- * Club domestic league appearances and goals as of 17 August 2024

Luka Cerar (born 26 May 1993) is a Slovenian footballer who plays for Austrian club SV Donau Klagenfurt.
