= Jaka Kolenc =

Slovenian footballer (born 1994)

Personal information
- Full name: Jaka Kolenc
- Date of birth: 23 February 1994 (age 32)
- Place of birth: Nova Gorica, Slovenia
- Height: 1.81 m (5 ft 11 in)
- Position: Midfielder

Team information
- Current team: Radomlje
- Number: 8

Youth career
- –2013: Gorica

Senior career*
Years	Team	Apps	(Gls)
2013–2020	Gorica	132	(3)
2013–2014	→ Brda (loan)	19	(2)
2014–2015	→ Tolmin (loan)	17	(1)
2020–2023	Chrobry Głogów	94	(3)
2023–2025	Podbeskidzie	27	(0)
2025–	Radomlje	7	(0)
- * Club domestic league appearances and goals as of 25 June 2025

Jaka Kolenc (born 23 February 1994) is a Slovenian professional footballer who plays as a midfielder for Slovenian PrvaLiga club Radomlje.
