= Dejan Žigon =

Slovenian footballer

Personal information
- Date of birth: 30 March 1989 (age 37)
- Place of birth: Šempeter pri Gorici, SFR Yugoslavia
- Height: 1.71 m (5 ft 7 in)
- Position: Midfielder

Youth career
- –2009: Gorica

Senior career*
Years	Team	Apps	(Gls)
2009–2013	Gorica	82	(17)
2011	→ Bela Krajina (loan)	12	(2)
2013–2014	Barletta	15	(0)
2014–2015	Gorica	29	(7)
2015–2016	Olimpia Grudziądz	16	(1)
2016–2018	Gorica	63	(9)
2018–2019	Belluno 1905	20	(4)
2019	Cjarlins Muzane	8	(0)
2020	Brian Lignano		
2020–2022	Gemonese 1919		
2022–2023	Pro Gorizia		
2023	Bilje	0	(0)

International career
2007	Slovenia U18		
2007	Slovenia U19		
- * Club domestic league appearances and goals

Dejan Žigon (born 30 March 1989) is a Slovenian former professional footballer who played as a midfielder.

== Career ==
In June 2019, Žigon joined Italian Serie D club Cjarlins Muzane. He left the club at the end of the year, after signing a pre-contract with Italian Eccellenza club Brian Lignano Calcio in December 2019.
