= Domžale =

- Town
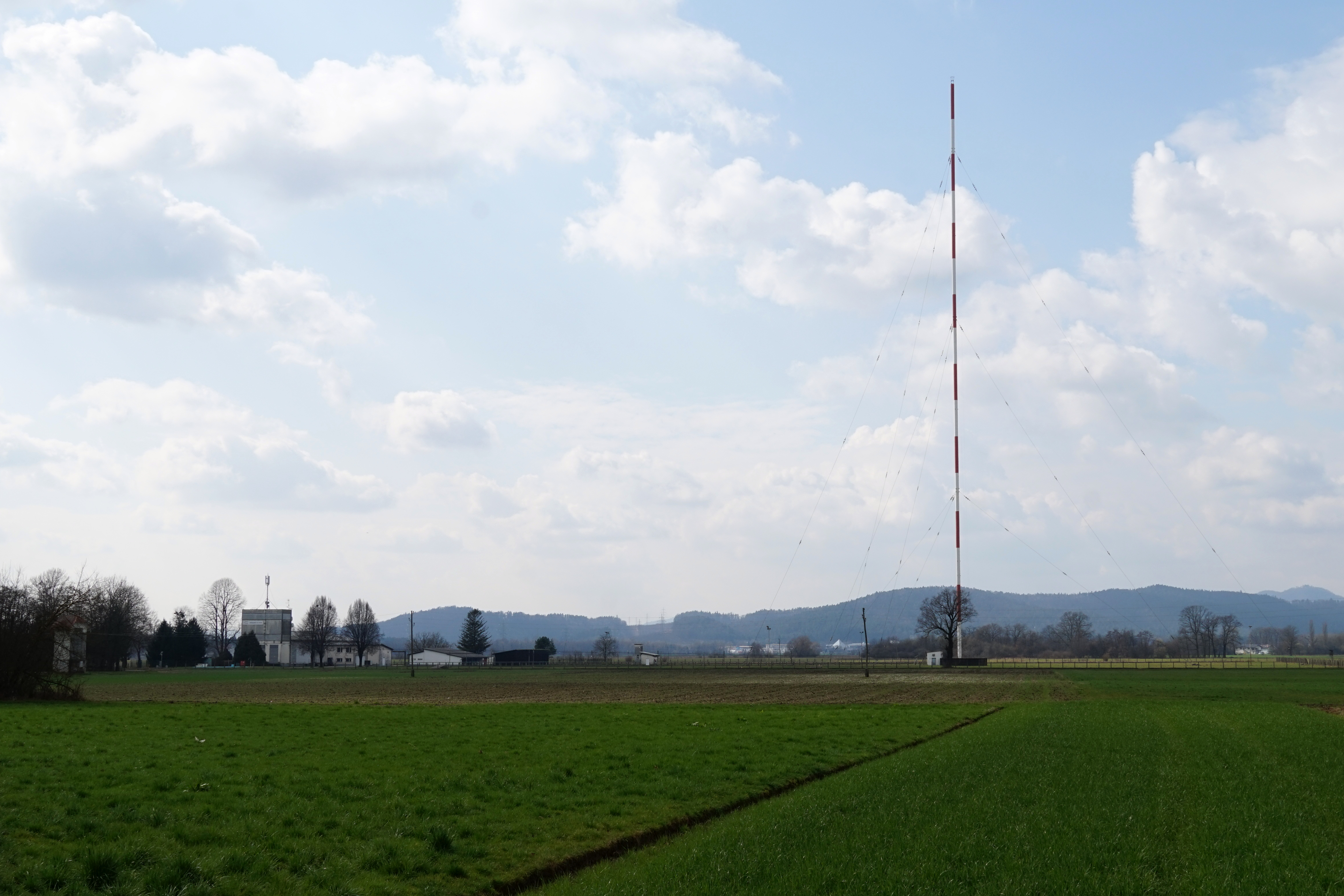
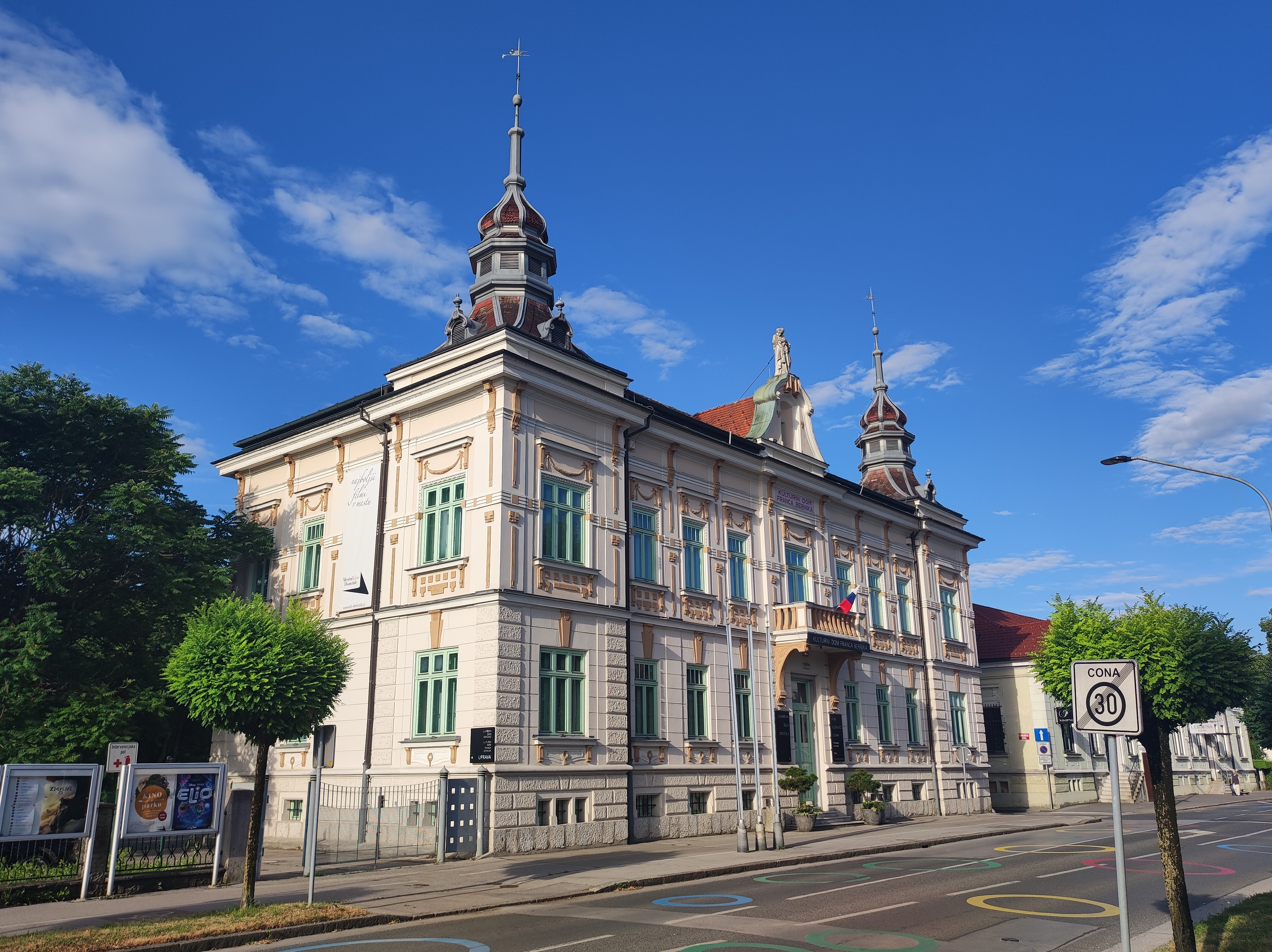
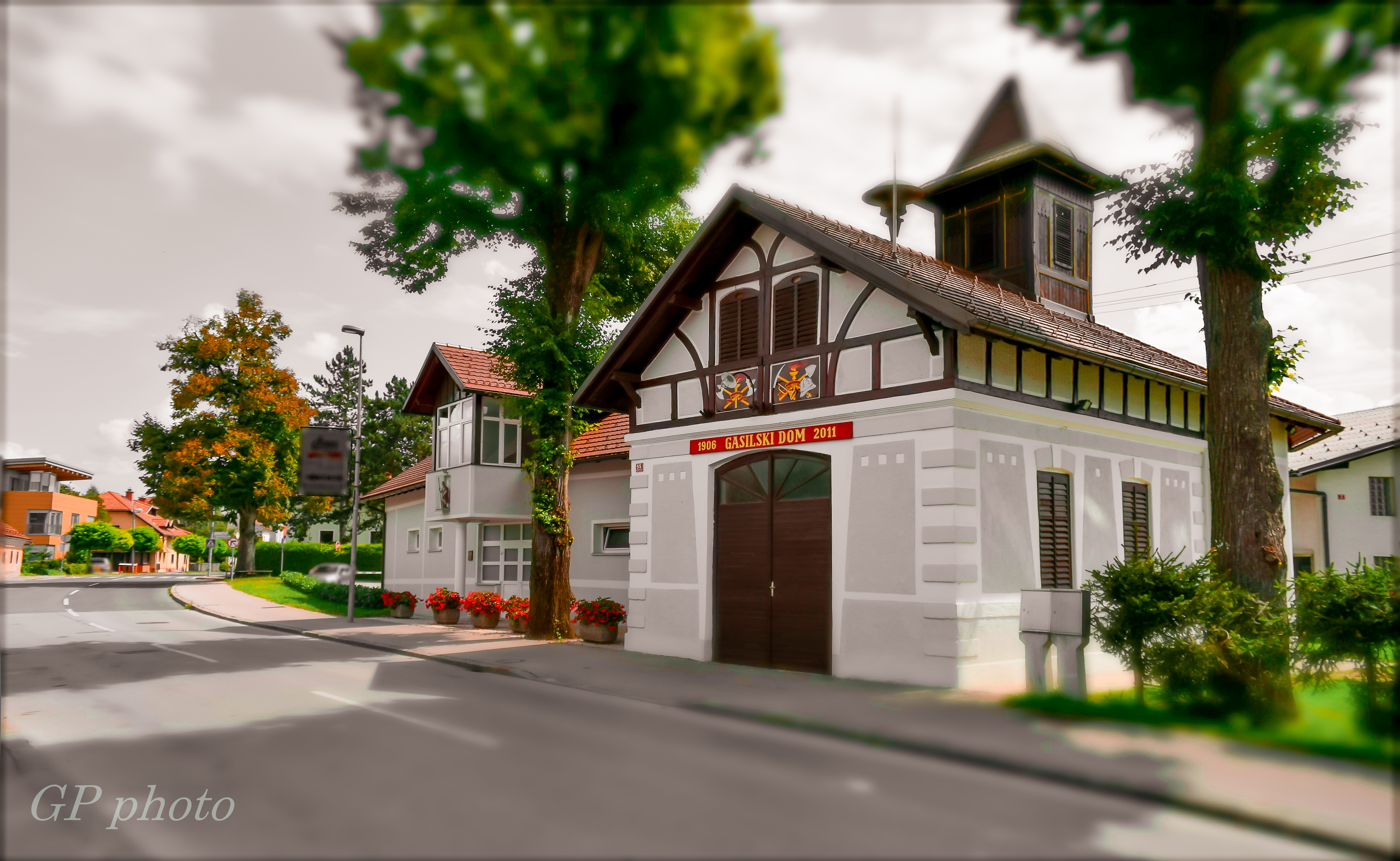
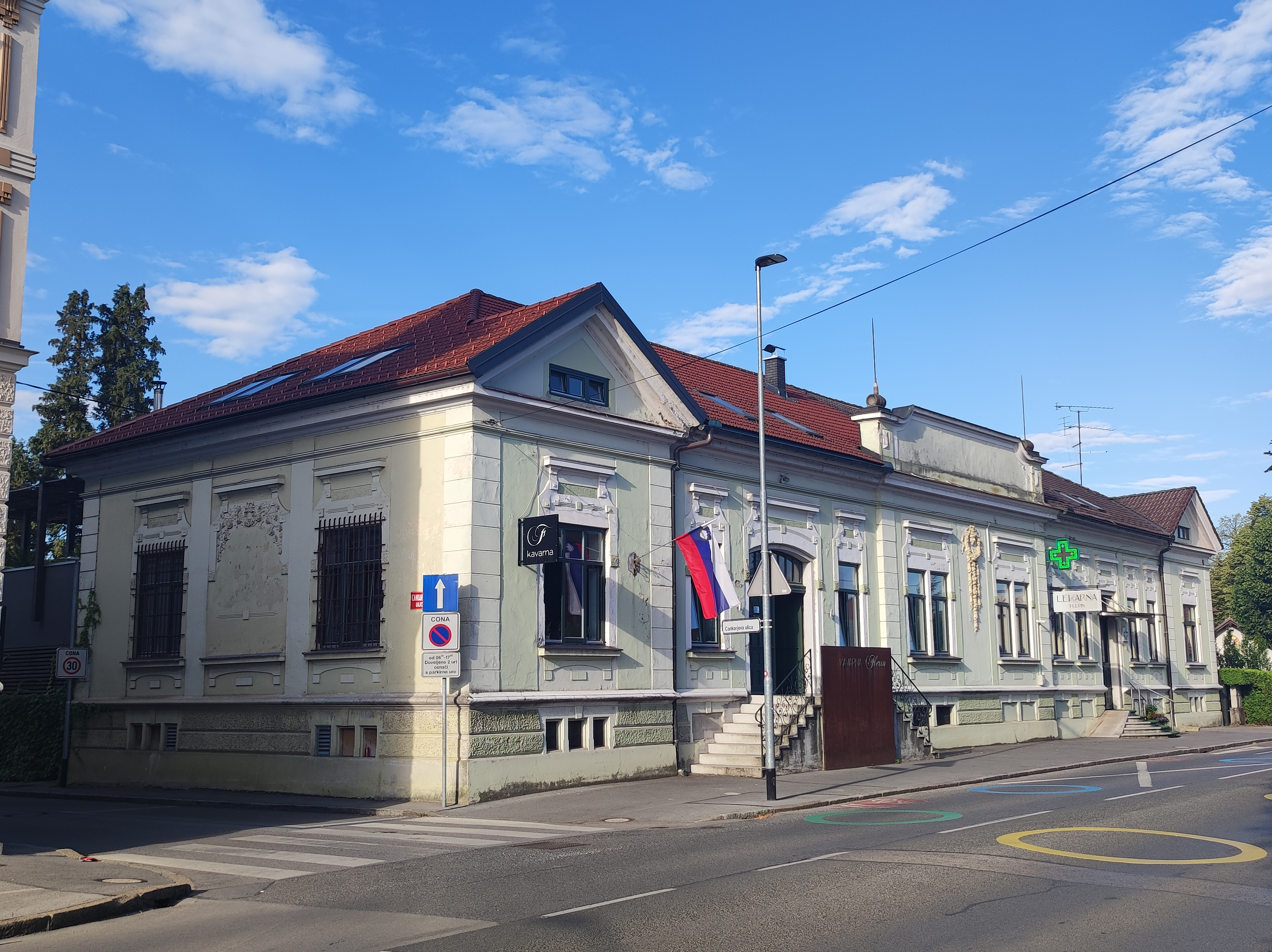
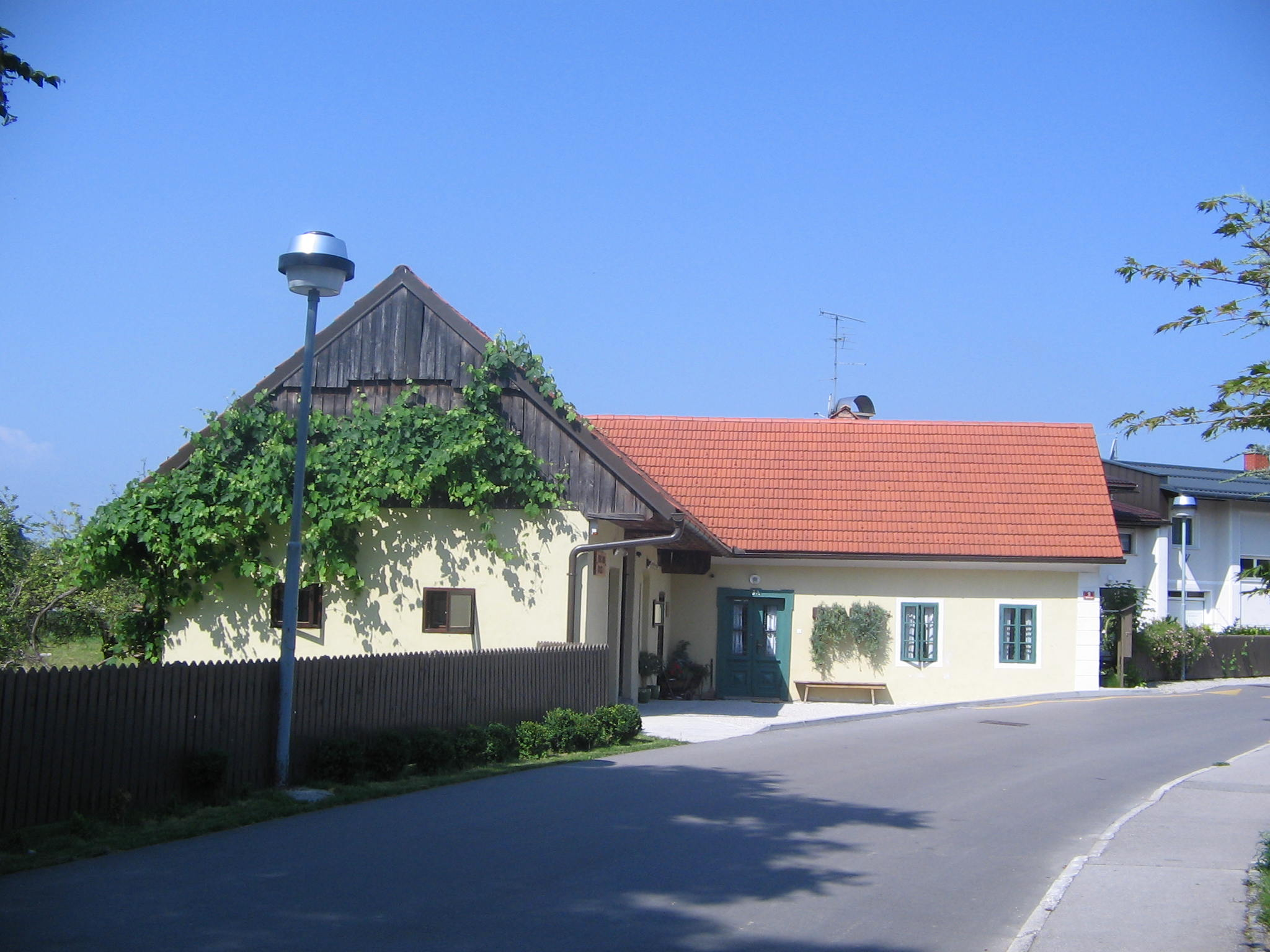
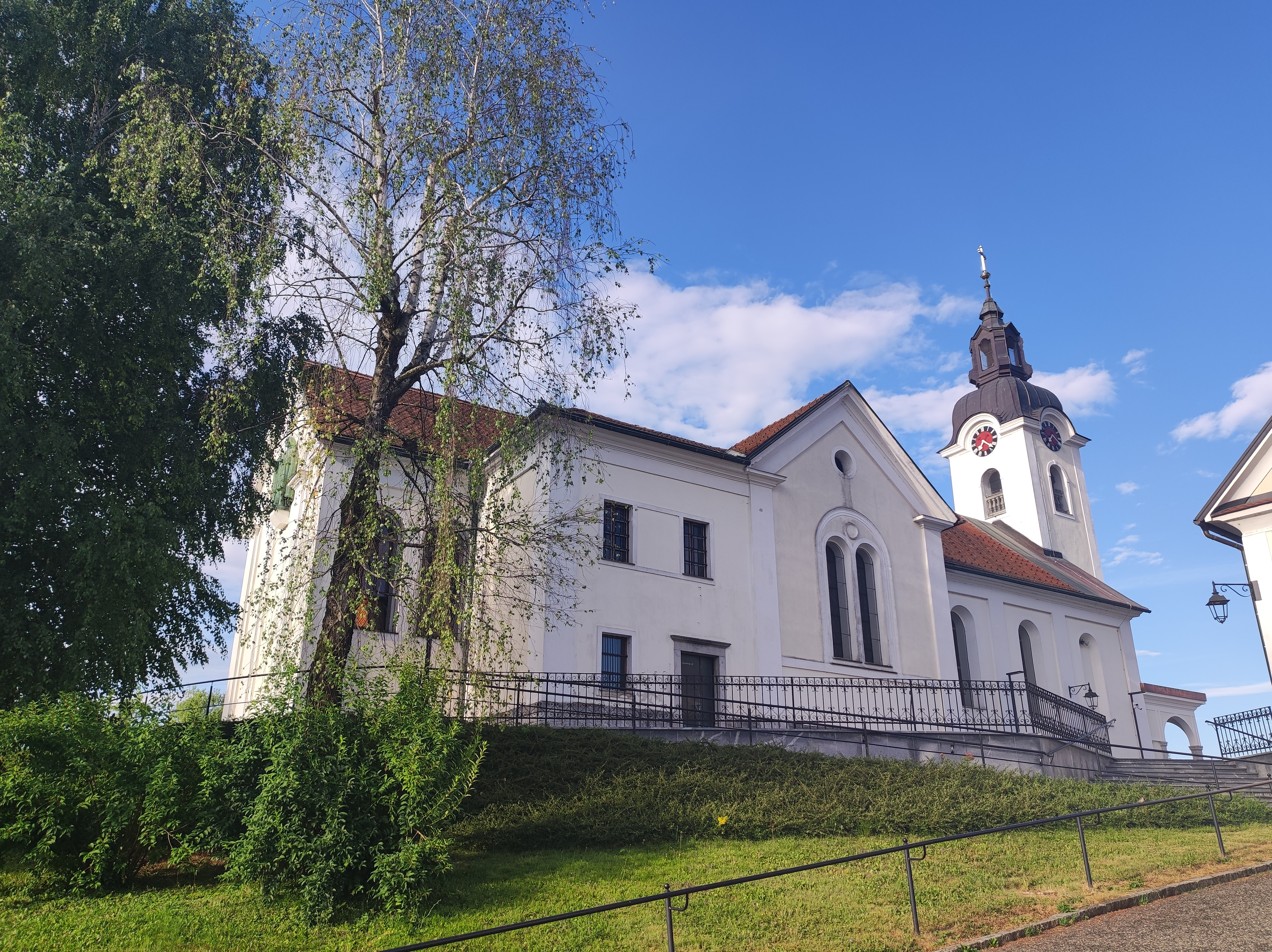
- From top, left to right: View from afar, Town Hall, Old Firefighter Station, Menačenko Homestead, Assumption of Mary Church

- Flag Coat of arms

- Location in Slovenia
- Coordinates: 46°8′22″N 14°35′42″E
- Country: Slovenia
- Traditional region: Upper Carniola
- Statistical region: Central Slovenia
- Municipality: Domžale

Area
  - Land: 5.2 km^{2} (2.0 sq mi)
- Elevation: 304 m (997 ft)

Population (2023)
  - Town: 13.222
  - Density: 2.5/km^{2} (6.6/sq mi)
  - Urban: 25.620
- Time zone: UTC+01 (CET)
  - Summer (DST): UTC+02 (CEST)
- Postal code: 1230
- Vehicle registration: LJ

Domžale (Slovene pronunciation: [dɔmˈʒàːlɛ]; German: Domschale) is a town and the seat of the Municipality of Domžale in Slovenia. The town lies near the foothills of the Kamnik Alps and is crossed by the Kamnik Bistrica River. It includes the neighborhoods of Zgornje Domžale (pronounced [ˈzɡóːɾnjɛ dɔmˈʒàːlɛ]; German: Oberdomschale), Spodnje Domžale (pronounced [ˈspóːdnjɛ dɔmˈʒàːlɛ]; German: Unterdomschale), and Študa. Domžale is known today for its small businesses, agriculture, and light industry.

== Name ==
Domžale was attested in written sources circa 1200–1230 as Domsselsdorf (and as Vnheilden dorf in 1260, Vnsselsdorf in 1302, Vnsersdorf in 1322, Dumsel in 1490, and Damschale in 1558, among other variations.) The medieval German name Unser(s)dorf is derived from (D)unselsdorf, which was presumably borrowed from the Slovene name and from which the initial D- was lost because it was reanalyzed as a definite article. The Slovene name could be reconstructed as *Domžaľe, based on a Slavic personal name such as *Domožalъ and referring to an early inhabitant of the place. Alternatively, the Slovene name may be borrowed from Middle High German Domsell(sdorf), based in turn on a Slavic name such as *Domoslavъ. In the local dialect, the town is referred to as Dumžale. In the past the German name was Domschale.

== History ==
Domžale became a town in 1925 through the merger of the formerly independent settlements of Spodnje Domžale, Stob, Študa, and Zgornje Domžale. It became a city on 19 April 1952. In the following years, Domžale became an industrial center with strong chemical and textile industry. In 1980, the construction of modern apartments began and Domžale became known as a bedroom community of Ljubljana. After Slovenia declared independence, on 27 June 1991 the Yugoslav army attacked barricades in the town, and bombed the radio transmitter and houses.

In 2022, strong winds left several roofs exposed in the Municipality of Domžale. Firefighters had to pump water out of basements and assist with roof repairs in Domžale, Preserje pri Radomljah, and Šentpavel pri Domžalah.

== Church ==
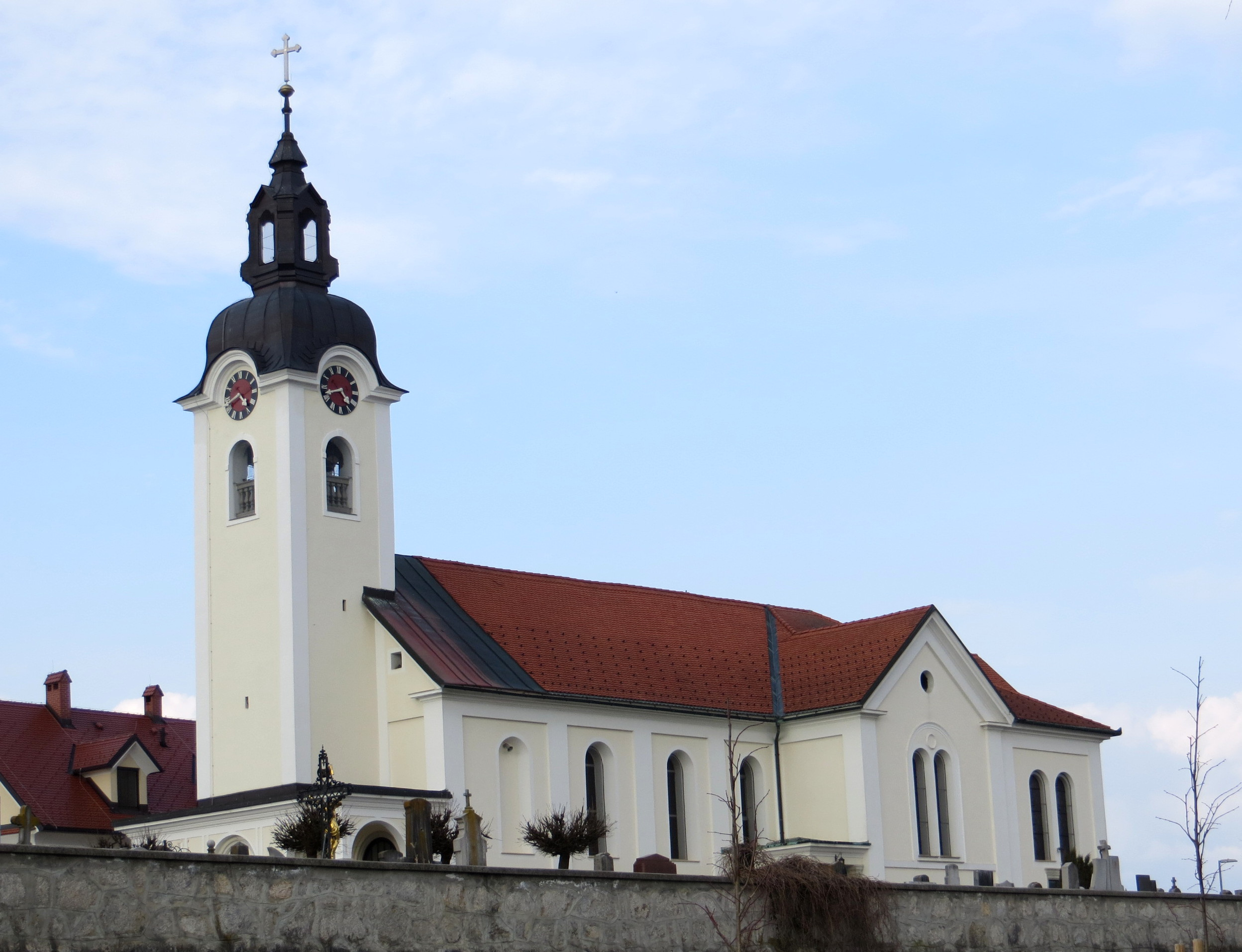
Assumption Church

The church in Domžale is dedicated to the Assumption of Mary. It is surrounded by a cemetery and stands on a hill just north of the new municipal cemetery. In early 2012, the church's tower caught fire and destroyed its roof.

== Radio transmitter ==
The Domžale radio transmitter, the most powerful transmitter in Slovenia, is located near Domžale. It operates on medium wave frequency 918 kHz and can be received at night throughout Europe. It uses a 161 m guyed steel tube mast as an aerial.

== Sports ==
- KK Kansai Helios Domžale
- NK Domžale

== Notable people ==
Notable people that were born or lived in Domžale include:

- Ivan Ahčin (1897–1960), sociologist and journalist
- Franc Bernik (1870–1948), writer and composer
- Tine Hribar (born 1941), philosopher and public intellectual
- Jože Karlovšek (1900–1963), architect and ethnologist
- Urban Klavžar (born 2004), basketball player, 2025 NCAA national champion with the Florida Gators
- Janez K. Lapajne (1937–2012), geophysicist and seismologist
- Janez Lapajne (born 1967), filmmaker
- Matija Rode (1879–1961), journalist and librarian
- Josip Sicherl (1860–1935), composer
- Dalibor Stevanović (born 1984), footballer
- Matija Tomc (1899–1986), composer
- Radovan Trifunović (born 1973), basketball coach
- Jan Vide (born 2005), basketball player

== Gallery ==
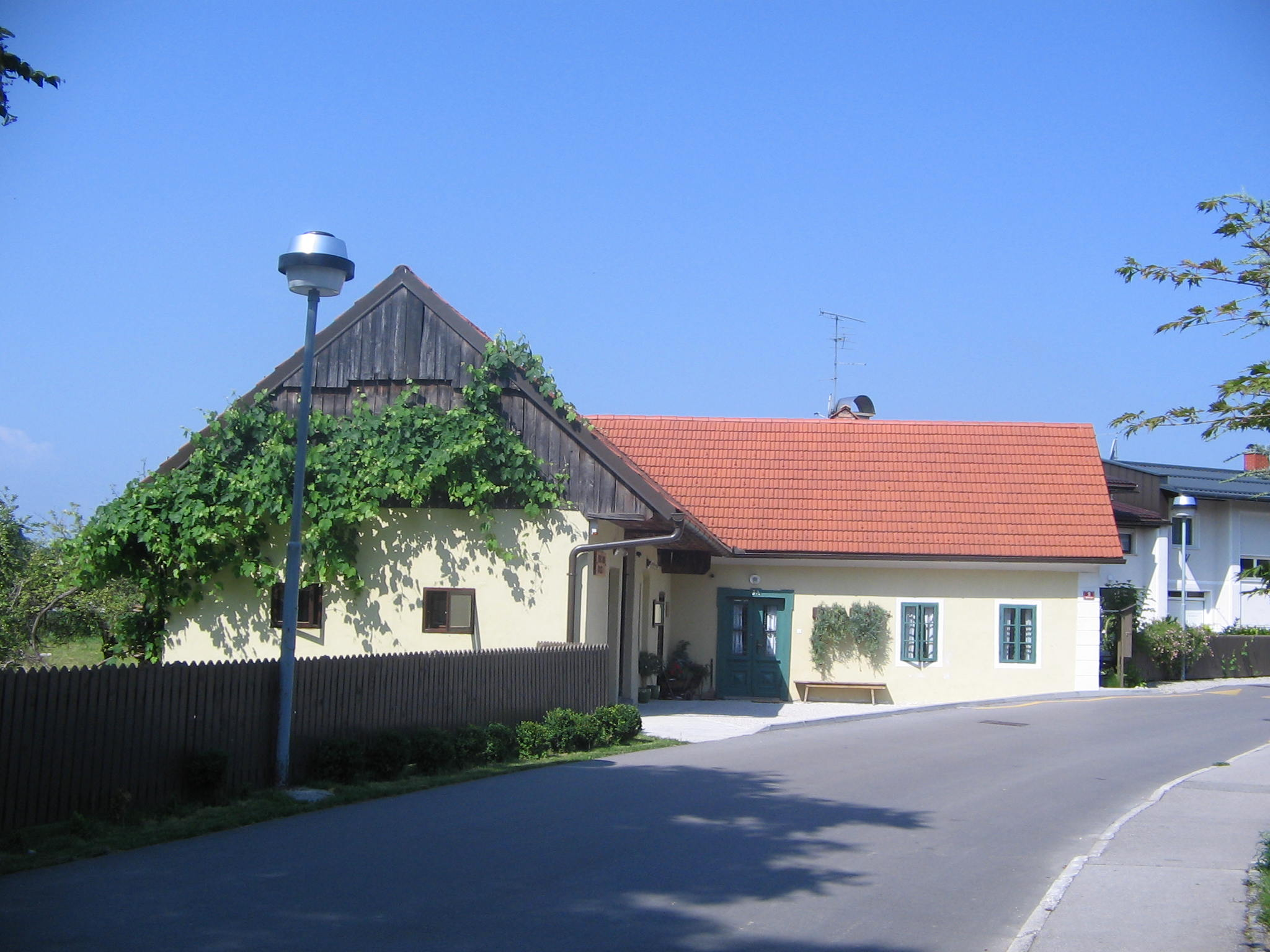
The Menačenk House
