= Šentpavel pri Domžalah =

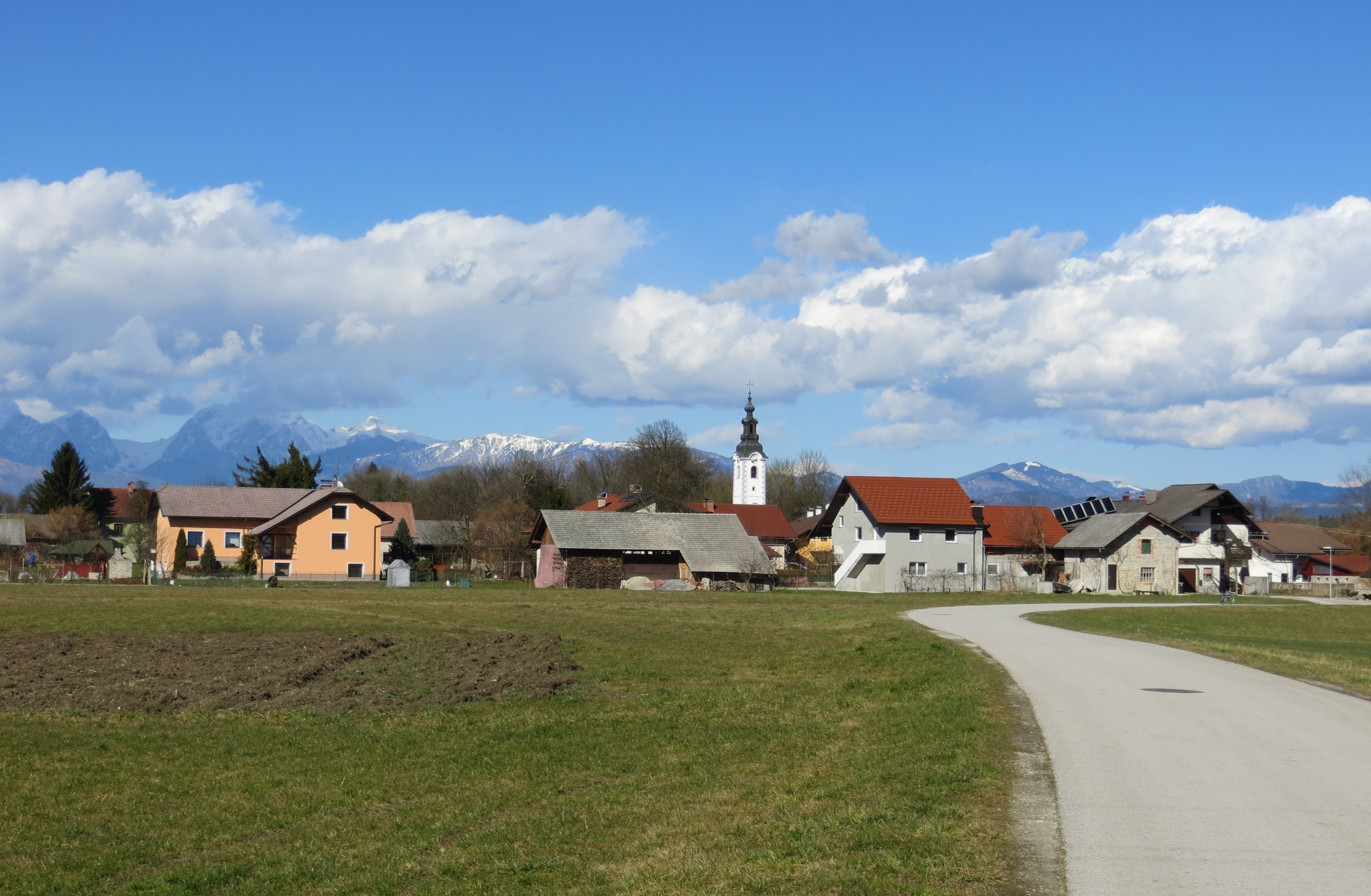

- Location in Slovenia
- Coordinates: 46°6′47.56″N 14°35′56.67″E
- Country: Slovenia
- Traditional region: Upper Carniola
- Statistical region: Central Slovenia
- Municipality: Domžale

Area
  - Total: 1.04 km^{2} (0.40 sq mi)
- Elevation: 285.8 m (938 ft)

Population (2002)
  - Total: 62

Šentpavel pri Domžalah (pronounced [ʃɛntˈpaːʋəl pɾi dɔmˈʒaːlax] or [ʃəntˈpaːʋəl pɾi dɔmˈʒaːlax]; German: Sankt Paul) is a small settlement south of Domžale in the Upper Carniola region of Slovenia.

== Name ==
The name of the settlement was changed from Šent Pavel to Šentpavel pri Domžalah in 1955. In the past the German name was Sankt Paul.

== History ==
In 2022, strong winds left several roofs exposed in the Municipality of Domžale. Firefighters had to pump water out of basements and assist with roof repairs in Domžale, Preserje pri Radomljah, and Šentpavel pri Domžalah.
