= Spodnje Domžale =

Former settlement in Slovenia

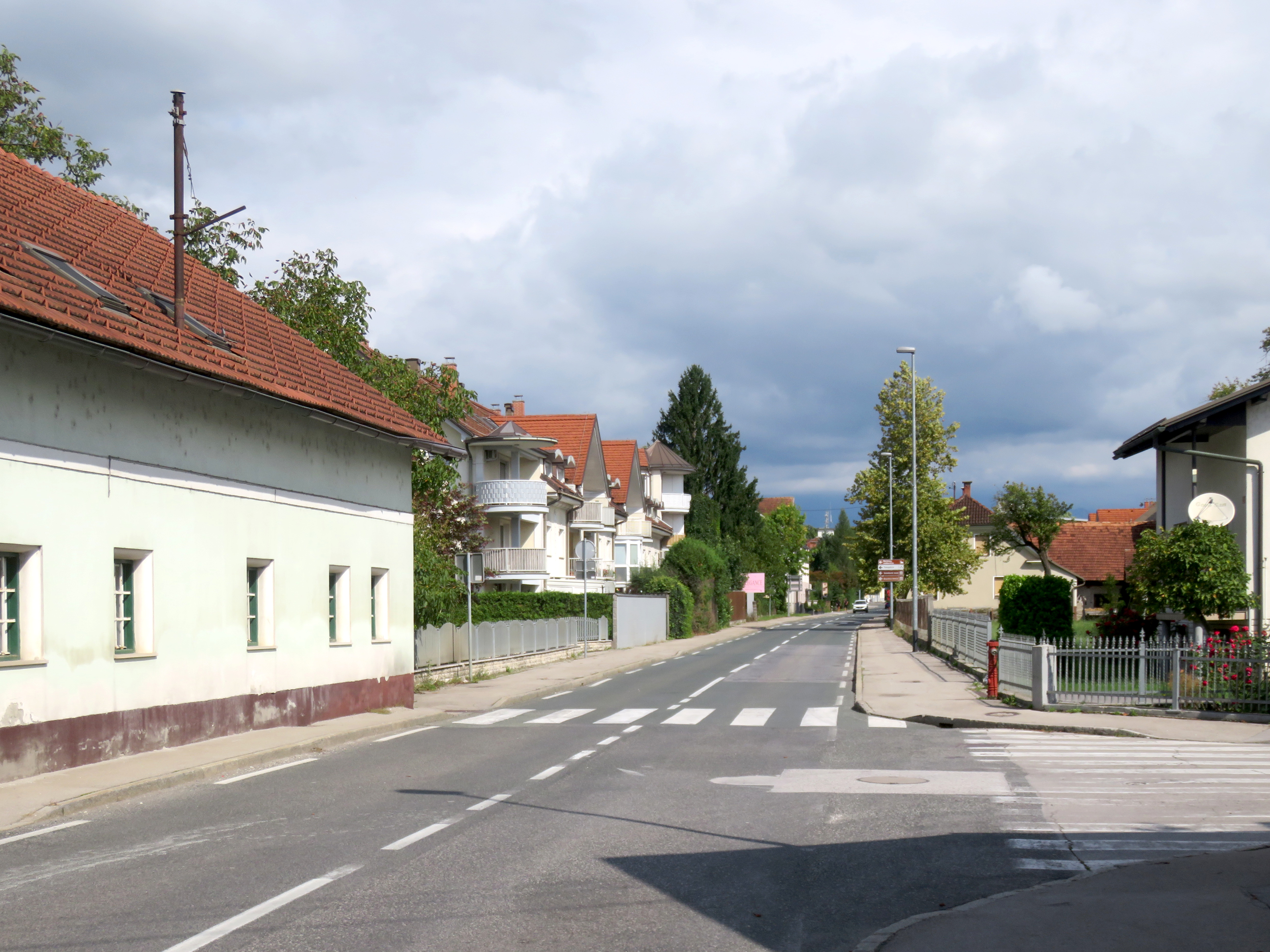

- Location in Slovenia
- Coordinates: 46°8′02″N 14°35′41″E
- Country: Slovenia
- Traditional region: Upper Carniola
- Statistical region: Central Slovenia
- Municipality: Domžale
- Elevation: 296 m (971 ft)

Spodnje Domžale (pronounced [ˈspoːdnjɛ dɔmˈʒaːlɛ]; German: Unterdomschale) is a former village that is now part of Domžale in the Upper Carniola region of Slovenia.

== Geography ==
Spodnje Domžale stands along Sava Street (Savska cesta), which runs south from Domžale toward Dragomelj. Mlinščica Creek, a tributary of the Kamnik Bistrica River, flows through the eastern part of the settlement, and the former village of Stob lies to the northwest. The soil in the area is sandy and the fields to the south are intensely cultivated.

== Name ==
The name Spodnje Domžale literally means 'lower Domžale'. The settlement stands about 7 meters (23 ft) lower in elevation than the former village of Zgornje Domžale (literally, 'upper Domžale'). See Domžale for the etymology of the name.

== History ==
Spodnje Domžale had a population of 324 living in 47 houses in 1900. Spodnje Domžale was merged with the formerly independent settlements of Stob, Študa, and Zgornje Domžale in 1925 to create the town of Domžale.
