= Študa =

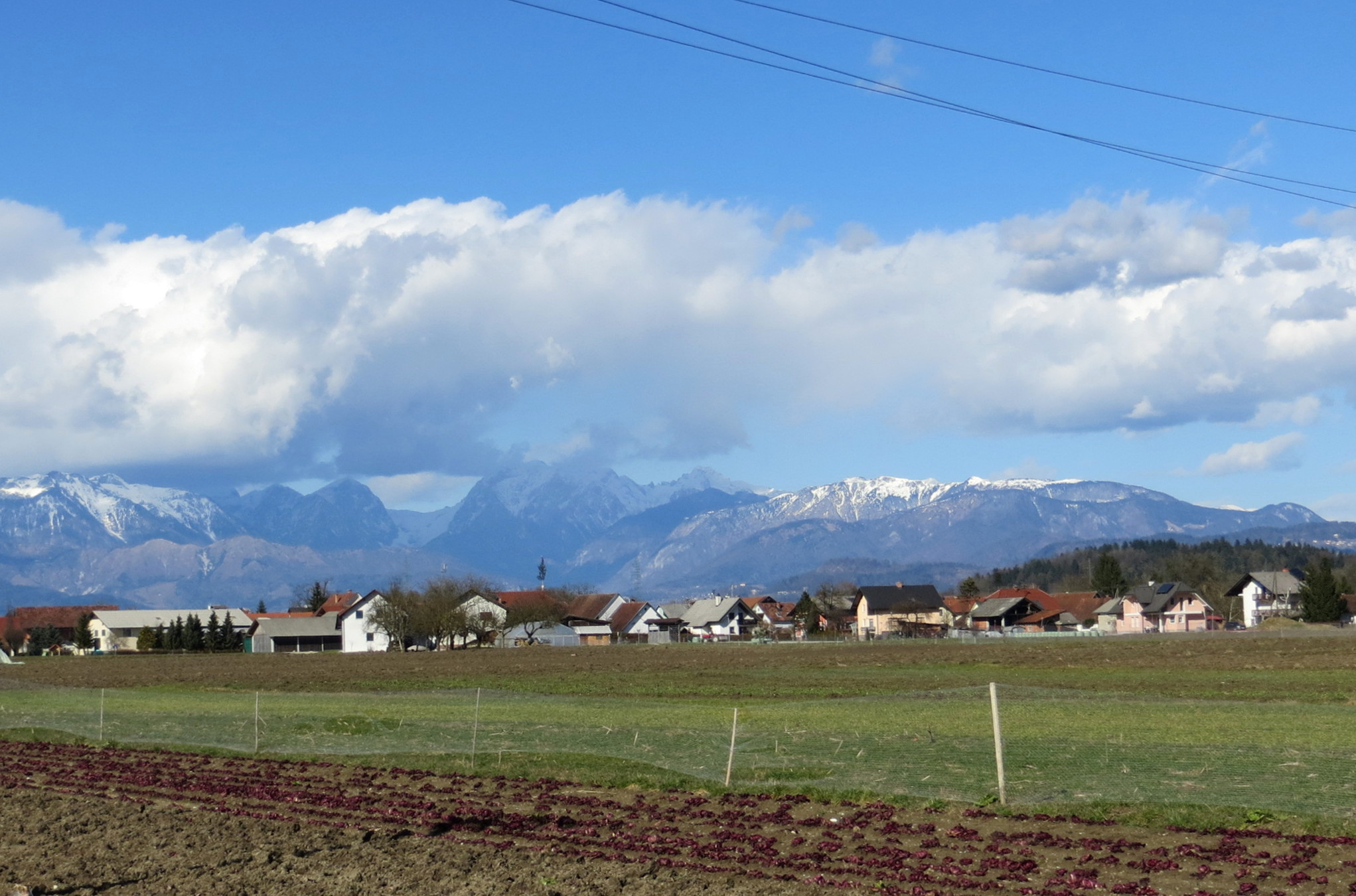

- Location in Slovenia
- Coordinates: 46°7′30.62″N 14°35′57.45″E
- Country: Slovenia
- Traditional region: Upper Carniola
- Statistical region: Central Slovenia
- Municipality: Domžale
- Elevation: 291 m (955 ft)

Študa (pronounced [ˈʃtuːda]; in older sources also Studa; German: Studa) is a former village that is now part of Domžale in the Upper Carniola region of Slovenia.

== Geography ==
Študa is a sprawling settlement south of the main core of Domžale. It lies along the lower reaches of Mlinščica Creek, a tributary of the Kamnik Bistrica. The soil in the area is sandy and the fields to the south are intensely cultivated.

== Name ==
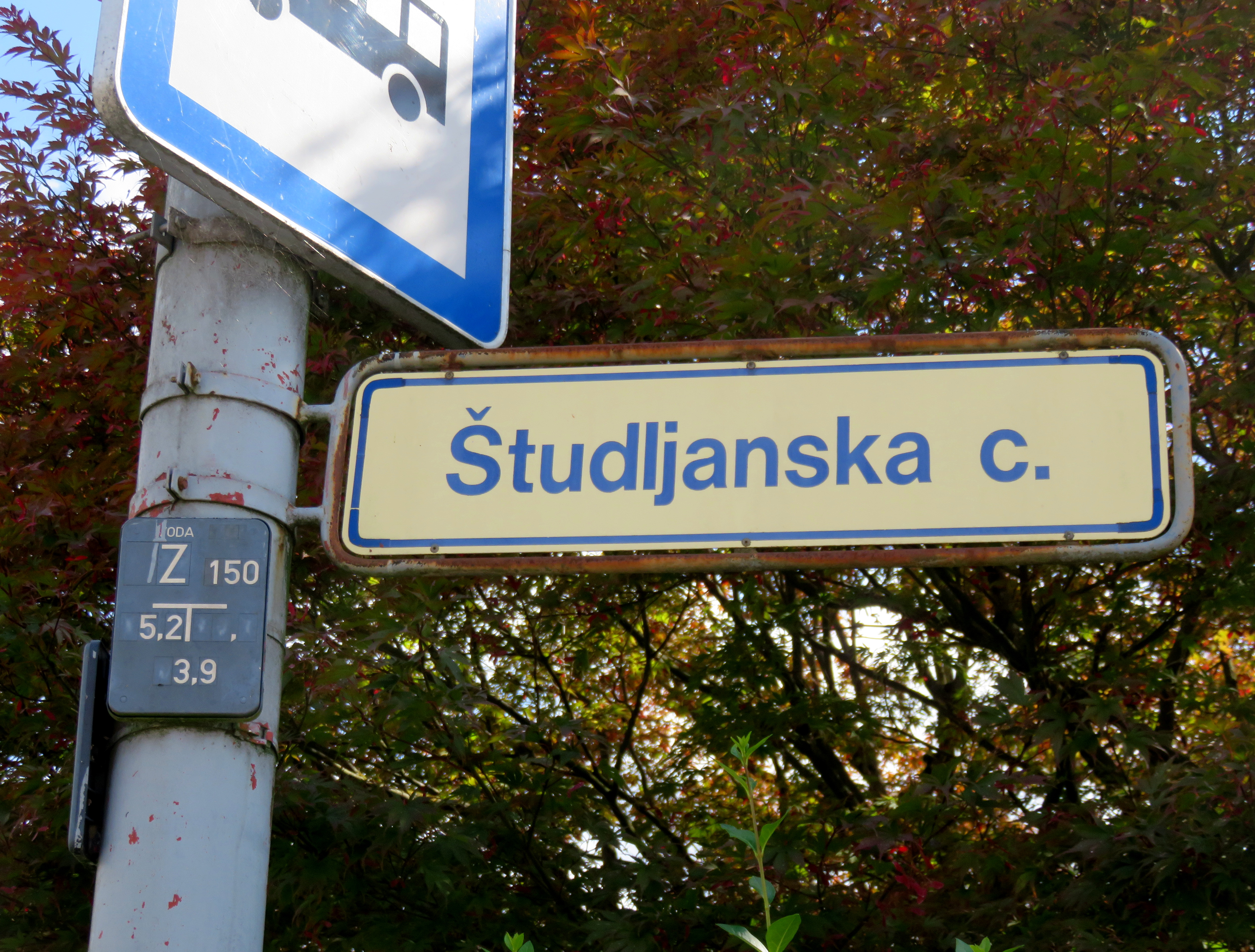
Sign for Študa Street (Študljanska cesta)

Študa was mentioned in historical sources as Stude in a document from 1205 (in which a witness signed himself as Grifo de Stude).

== History ==
Študa was the very first of the settlements comprising Domžale to be mentioned in historical sources, in 1205. During the Middle Ages, the various farms in Študa were held in feud to a variety of estates (Smlednik, Bogenšperk, Križ, and Bokavce) and parishes (Mengeš and Kamnik). The region was affected by the plague around 1600, as evidenced by the Dimec plague column (Slovene: Dimčevo znamenje) dating from 1602. The shrine stands west of the village along the road to Dragomelj. The farmers in Študa held common land until 1882, when it was divided. Along with Spodnje Domžale, Stob, and Zgornje Domžale, Študa was amalgamated into Domžale in 1925, ending its existence as an independent settlement. A radio transmitter capable of broadcasting across Slovenia was set up in the meadow west of Študa in 1928.
