= Stob, Domžale =

Former settlement in Slovenia

Stob
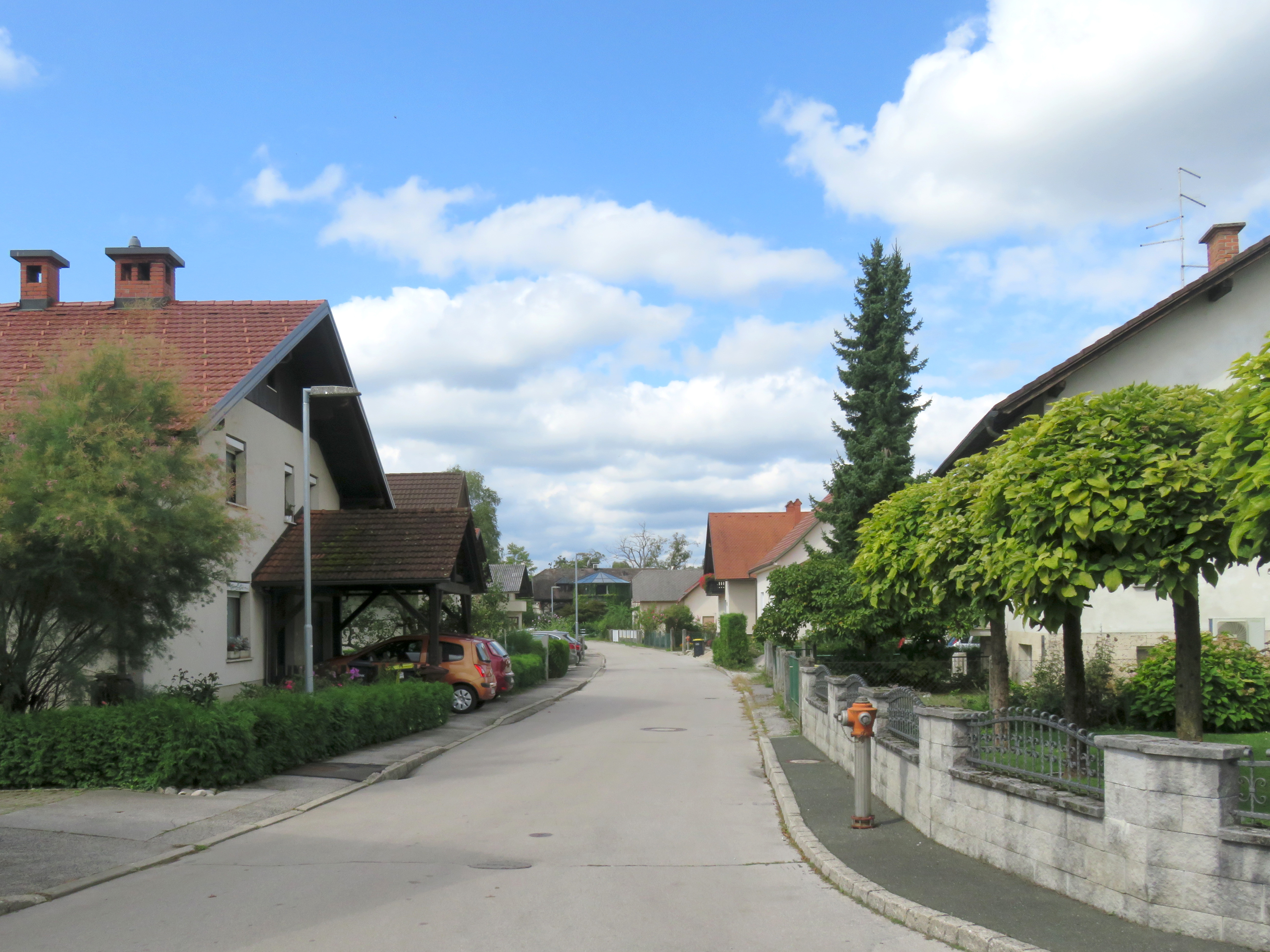

- Location in Slovenia
- Coordinates: 46°8′14″N 14°35′11″E
- Country: Slovenia
- Traditional region: Upper Carniola
- Statistical region: Central Slovenia
- Municipality: Domžale
- Elevation: 298 m (978 ft)

Stob (pronounced [ˈstoːp], in older sources also Stop, is a former village that is now part of Domžale in the Upper Carniola region of Slovenia.

== Geography ==
Stob is located along the main road through what is now the southwestern part of Domžale. Srednjak Creek, a tributary of the Pšata River, flows through the western edge of Stob.

== Name ==
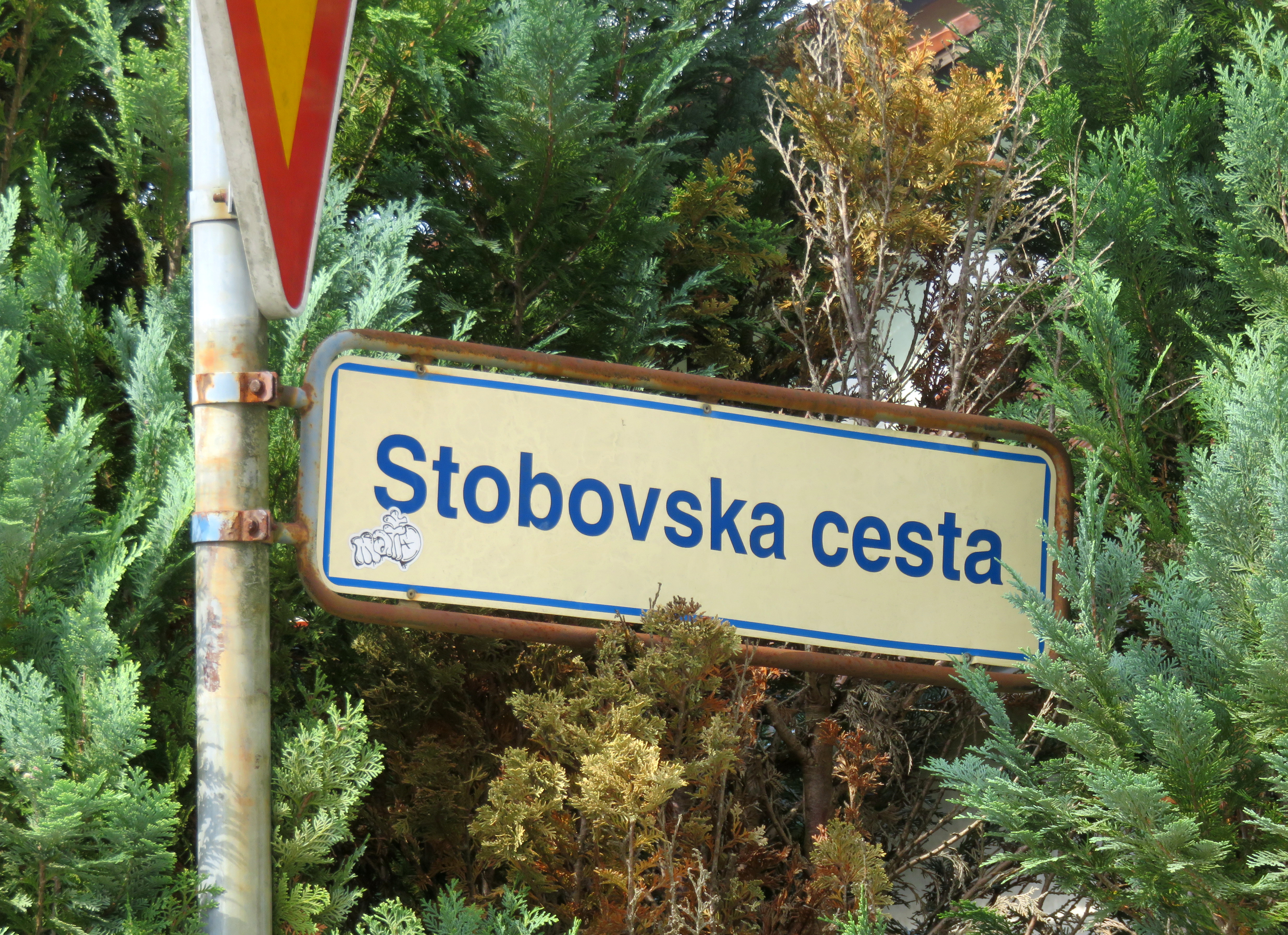
A sign for Stob Street (Stobovska cesta)

Stob was attested in historical sources as Stuͦb in 1322, Ztwͦb in 1330, Stuͤb in 1336, and Stueben in 1457, among other variations. It has been suggested that the name is related to the Slovene common noun steber (dialect stober) 'column, post'.

== History ==
Stob had a population of 368 living in 59 houses in 1900. Stob was merged with the formerly independent settlements of Spodnje Domžale, Študa, and Zgornje Domžale in 1925 to create the town of Domžale.

== Church ==
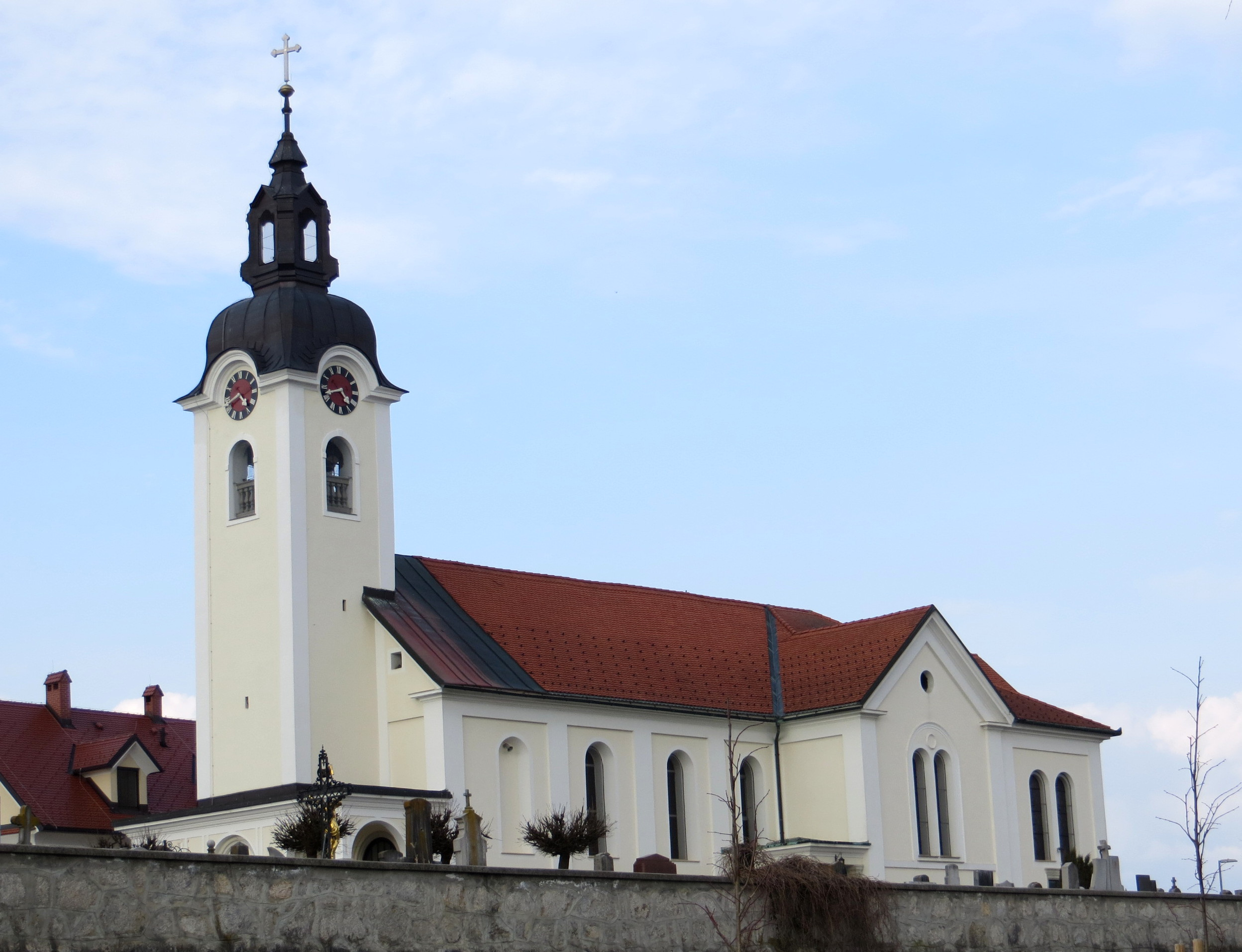
Assumption Church

The church in Stob is dedicated to the Assumption of Mary and serves as the parish church of Domžale. It is surrounded by a cemetery and stands on Goričica Hill southeast of the village center of Stob. The first church at the cite was mentioned in 1526. Its walls were rebuilt in 1532, and it underwent thorough renovation between 1892 and 1896, including removal of its fortified walls and four defense towers. Further renovation took place in 1938.
