= Zgornje Domžale =

Former settlement in Slovenia

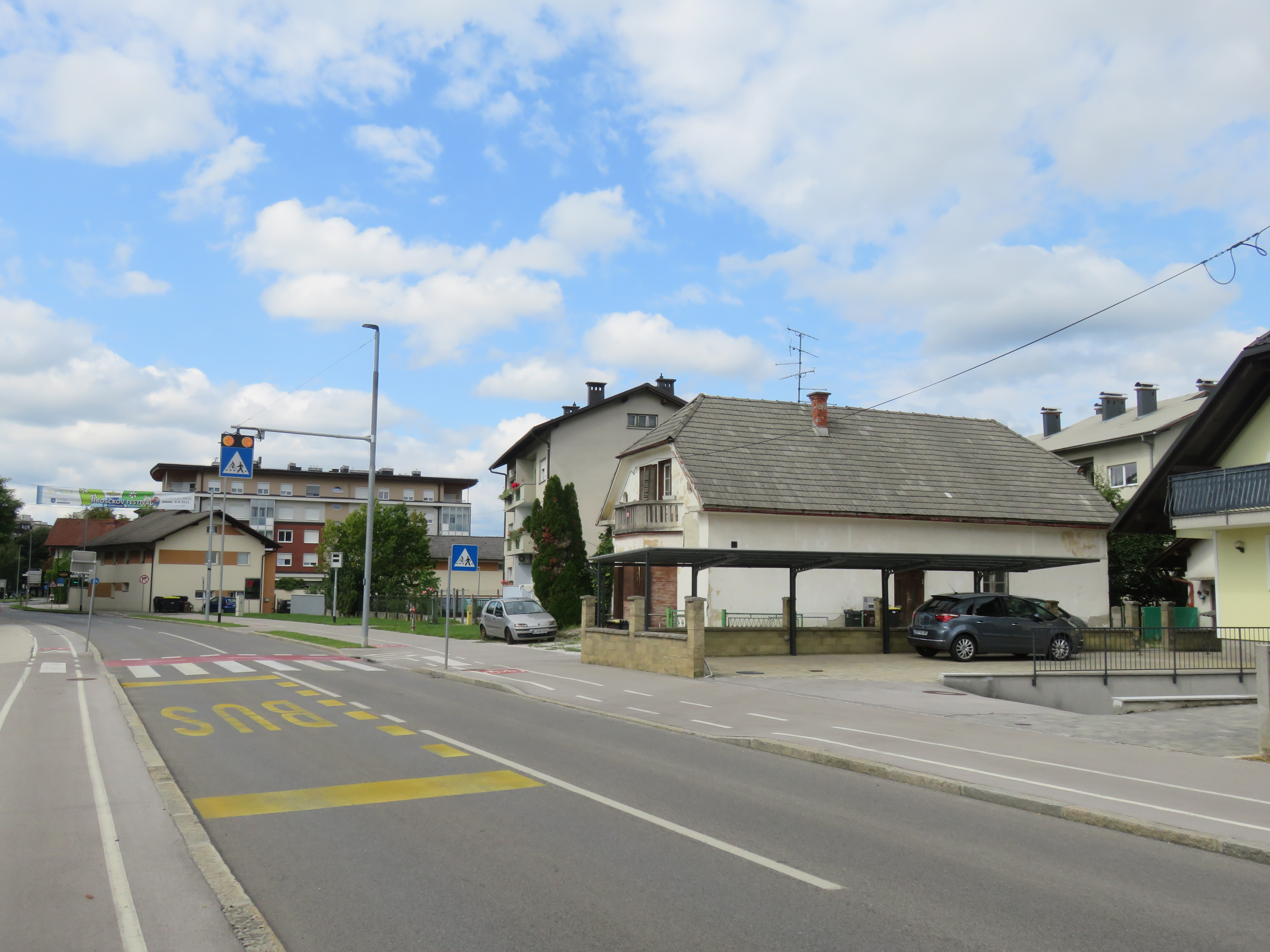

- Location in Slovenia
- Coordinates: 46°8′34″N 14°35′51″E
- Country: Slovenia
- Traditional region: Upper Carniola
- Statistical region: Central Slovenia
- Municipality: Domžale
- Elevation: 303 m (994 ft)

Zgornje Domžale (pronounced [ˈzɡoːrnjɛ dɔmˈʒaːlɛ]; German: Oberdomschale) is a former village that is now part of Domžale in the Upper Carniola region of Slovenia.

== Geography ==
Zgornje Domžale was located in what is now the northern part of Domžale. Mlinščica Creek, a tributary of the Kamnik Bistrica River, flows through the eastern part of the settlement.

== Name ==
The name Zgornje Domžale literally means 'upper Domžale'. The settlement stands about 7 meters (23 ft) higher in elevation than the former village of Spodnje Domžale (literally, 'lower Domžale'). See Domžale for the etymology of the name.

== History ==
Zgornje Domžale had a population of 926 living in 114 houses in 1900. Zgornje Domžale was merged with the formerly independent settlements of Spodnje Domžale, Stob, and Študa in 1925 to create the town of Domžale.
