= Preserje pri Radomljah =

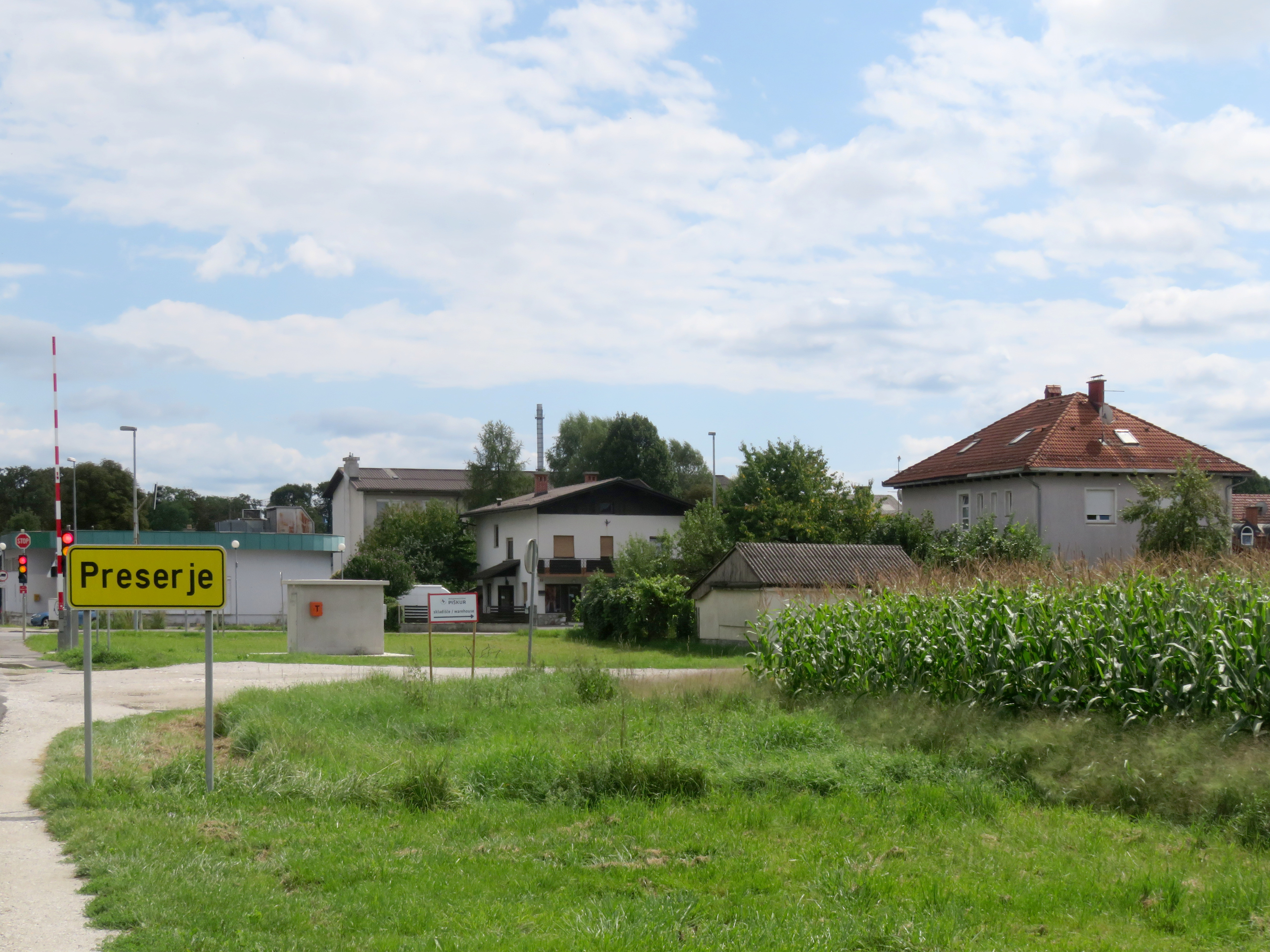

- Location in Slovenia
- Coordinates: 46°9′58.26″N 14°35′33.38″E
- Country: Slovenia
- Traditional region: Upper Carniola
- Statistical region: Central Slovenia
- Municipality: Domžale

Area
  - Total: 1.17 km^{2} (0.45 sq mi)
- Elevation: 321.8 m (1,056 ft)

Population (2020)
  - Total: 2,070
  - Density: 1,770/km^{2} (4,580/sq mi)

Preserje pri Radomljah (pronounced [preˈsɛːrjɛ pri ˈraːdɔmljax]) is a suburbanized settlement on the right bank of the Kamnik Bistrica River in the Municipality of Domžale in the Upper Carniola region of Slovenia.

== Name ==
The name of the settlement was changed from Preserje to Preserje pri Radomljah in 1953.

== History ==
In 2022, strong winds left several roofs exposed in the Municipality of Domžale. Firefighters had to pump water out of basements and assist with roof repairs in Domžale, Preserje pri Radomljah, and Šentpavel pri Domžalah.
